= 2024 NWSL expansion draft =

Soccer draft

2024 NWSL Expansion Draft

General information
- Sport: Soccer
- Date: December 15, 2023
- Network: CBS Sports Network
- Sponsored by: Ally

Overview
- 7 total selections in 12 rounds
- League: National Women's Soccer League
- Expansion teams: Bay FC; Utah Royals
- Expansion season: 2024

The 2024 NWSL Expansion Draft was an expansion draft held by the National Women's Soccer League (NWSL) on December 15, 2023, for two expansion teams, Bay FC and Utah Royals, to select players from existing teams in the league.

This was the league's last expansion draft. In September 2024, the league and its players' union entered into a new collective bargaining agreement (CBA) which effectively superseded the CBA that had been entered to in 2021 and was scheduled to end in 2026. The new CBA eliminated all forms of player drafts, including the expansion draft.

== Format ==
Bay FC selected first in the expansion draft, followed by Utah Royals. The expansion draft alternated between both teams across 12 rounds, allowing each team to select up to 12 players.

Each of the NWSL's 12 current teams was permitted to protect nine players, making them ineligible for selection. Furthermore, it was permitted to protect one additional player after the first expansion team selected a player from its roster.

== Draft results ==
- Italics indicate players who are not under contract but whose NWSL playing rights remain with the team

Round	Pick	Team	Nat.	Player	Pos.	Previous team	Ref.
1	1	Bay FC	(United States)	Alyssa Malonson	DF	Seattle Reign FC	
1	2	Utah Royals	(United States)	Elyse Bennett	FW	Seattle Reign FC	
2	3	Bay FC	(United States)	Tess Boade	FW	North Carolina Courage	
2	4	Utah Royals	(United States)	Paige Monaghan	FW	Racing Louisville FC	
3	5	Bay FC	(United States)	Rachel Hill	FW	San Diego Wave FC	
3	6	Utah Royals		PASS			
4	7	Bay FC	(United States)	Katelyn Rowland	GK	North Carolina Courage	
4	8	Utah Royals		PASS			
5	9	Bay FC		PASS			
5	10	Utah Royals		PASS			
6	11	Bay FC		PASS			
7	12	Bay FC	(United States)	Sierra Enge	MF	San Diego Wave FC	

== Protected lists by team ==
The following teams acquired expansion draft protections:

- On November 14, 2023, Orlando Pride traded for roster protection from Bay FC.
- On November 15, 2023, Kansas City Current traded for roster protection from Bay FC and Orlando Pride traded for roster protection from Utah Royals.
- On November 17, 2023, Racing Louisville FC traded for roster protection from Bay FC.
- On November 20, 2023, North Carolina Courage and San Diego Wave FC both traded for roster protection from Utah Royals.
- On December 12, 2023, Washington Spirit, Angel City FC, Portland Thorns FC, Houston Dash and NJ/NY Gotham FC all traded for roster protection from Utah Royals FC and Bay FC. Also, Kansas City Current traded for roster protection from Utah Royals FC.

On December 13, 2023, the NWSL released the protected lists from teams participating in the draft.

- **Bold** indicates players selected in the Expansion Draft
- Italics indicate players who are not under contract but whose NWSL playing rights remain with the team

Chicago Red Stars
Protected	Unprotected
Julia Bianchi (International – Brazil)	Jill Aguilera
Ava Cook	Jenna Bike
Penelope Hocking	Brooke Elby
Taylor Malham	Sami Feller
Tatumn Milazzo	Samantha Fisher
Alyssa Naeher	Zoey Goralski
Cari Roccaro	Sarah Griffith
Ally Schlegel	Sophie Jones
Arin Wright	Amanda Kowalski
	Karina LeBlanc
	Stephanie McCaffrey
	Addie McCain
	Zoe Morse
	Sarah Woldmoe
	Mackenzie Wood
	Grace Yochum (College Protected Player)

North Carolina Courage
Protected	Unprotected
Malia Berkely	**Tess Boade**
Sydney Collins	Marisa Bova
Kerolin (International – Brazil)	Mille Gejl (International – Denmark)
Riley Jackson	Hensley Hancuff
Kaleigh Kurtz	Haley Hopkins
Narumi Miura (International – Japan)	Estelle Johnson
Casey Murphy	Rikako Kobayashi (International – Japan)
Denise O'Sullivan	Tyler Lussi
Ryan Williams	Rikke Madsen
Manaka Matsukubo (Note: Loan-in protected, does not count towards North Carolina's total of nine (9) protected players) (International – Japan)	Fuka Nagano
	Victoria Pickett
	Brianna Pinto
	Clara Robbins
	**Katelyn Rowland**
	Meredith Speck
	Olivia Wingate

Seattle Reign FC
Protected	Unprotected
Bethany Balcer	Olivia Athens
Alana Cook	Lauren Barnes
Claudia Dickey	**Elyse Bennett**
Sofia Huerta	Ryanne Brown
Jordyn Huitema (International – Canada)	Jess Fishlock
Veronica Latsko	Samantha Hiatt
Phoebe McClernon	Shae Holmes
Quinn	Laurel Ivory
Olivia Van der Jagt	Jimena López (International – Mexico)
	Luany (International – Brazil)
	**Alyssa Malonson**
	Maia Pérez
	Morgan Proffitt
	Abby Wambach

Racing Louisville FC
Protected	Unprotected
Ary Borges (International - Brazil)	Jordan Baggett
Kirsten Davis	Hillary Beall
Savannah DeMelo	Jordyn Bloomer
Abby Erceg	Kayla Fischer
Jaelin Howell	Parker Goins
Katie Lund	Uchenna Kanu (International – Nigeria)
Lauren Milliet	Alanna Kennedy
Carson Pickett	Thembi Kgatlana (International – South Africa)
Elli Pikkujämsä (International – Finland)	Julia Lester
	**Paige Monaghan**
	Maddie Pokorny
	Olivia Sekany
	Wang Shuang

San Diego Wave FC
Protected	Unprotected
Amirah Ali	Belle Briede
Danielle Colaprico	Lauren Brzykcy
Abby Dahlkemper	Kyra Carusa
Naomi Girma	Giovanna DeMarco
Taylor Kornieck	Meggie Dougherty Howard
Kristen McNabb	**Sierra Enge**
Alex Morgan	**Rachel Hill**
Jaedyn Shaw	Sofia Jakobsson (International – Sweden)
Kailen Sheridan	Carly Telford
	Kelsey Turnbow
	Shae Yanez

== See also ==
- List of NWSL drafts
- 2024 National Women's Soccer League season
- 2024 NWSL Draft
