= 2019 NCAA Division I women's soccer championship game =

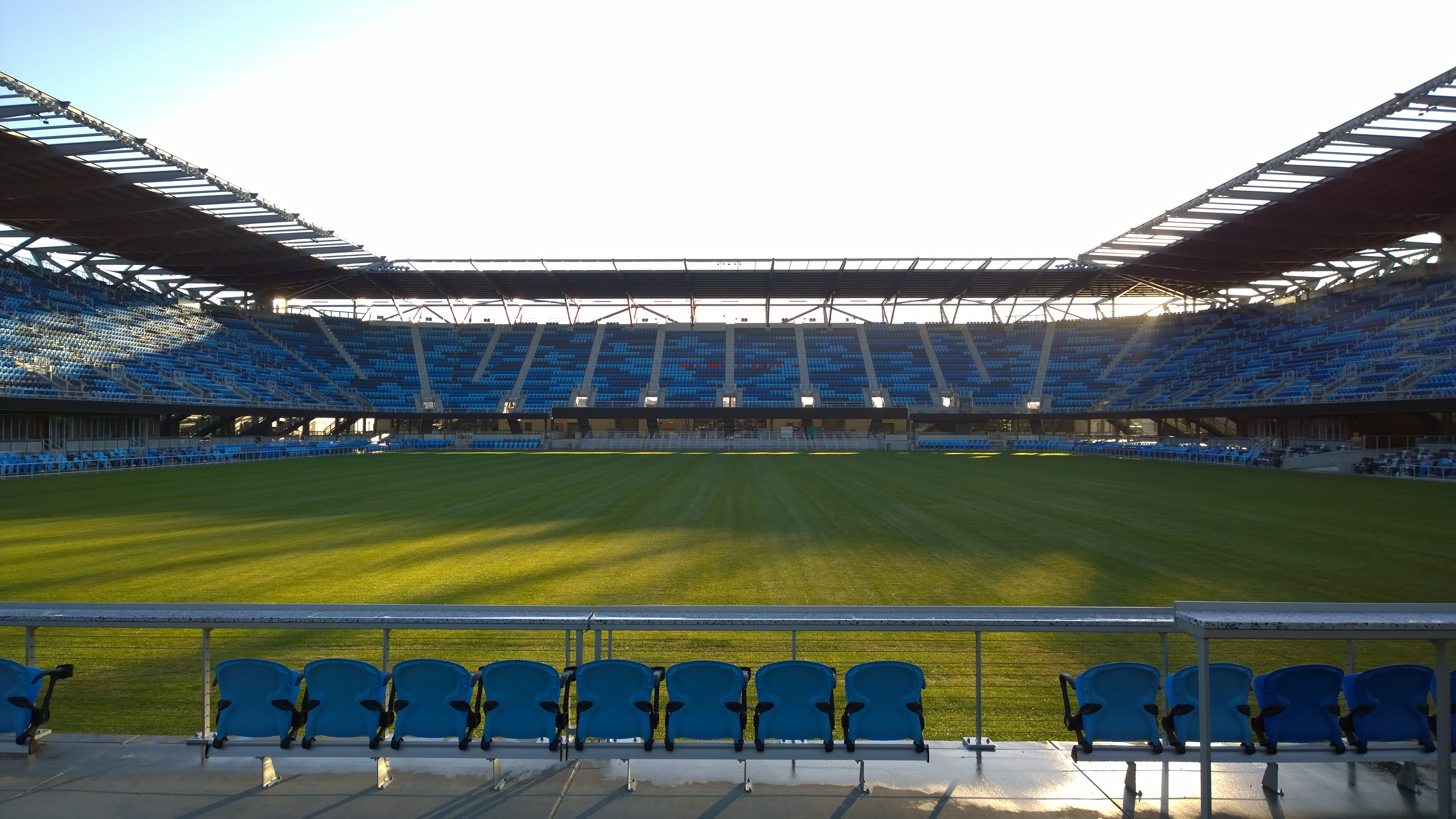
- Avaya Stadium hosted the match
- Event: 2019 NCAA Division I women's soccer tournament
North Carolina	Stanford
ACC	Pac-12
0	0
- after extra time Stanford won 5–4 on penalties
- Date: 8 December 2019
- Venue: Avaya Stadium, San Jose, CA
- Referee: Tori Penso
- Attendance: 9,591

The 2019 NCAA Division I women's soccer championship game (also known as the 2019 NCAA Division I Women's College Cup) was played on December 8, 2019, at Avaya Stadium in San Jose, California, and determined the winner of the 2019 NCAA Division I women's soccer tournament, the national collegiate women's soccer championship in the United States. This was the 38th. edition of this tournament organised by the NCAA.

The match featured University of North Carolina (24–2–1), which played its 26th. final, and Stanford University (24–1), which made its 5th. appearance in the final. After the match ended 0–0 throughout regulation and overtime, Stanford defeated North Carolina 5–4 on penalties to win its third NCAA women's soccer title. It was the first time in NCAA championship history that a final finished overtime scoreless.

Goalkeeper Katie Meyer was the key player for Stanford after two saves in the penalty shootout, while defender Kiki Pickett took the shot for the decisive 5–4 that allowed Stanford to win its third title since 2011. This championship also became the 125 NCAA title (151 championships overall) won by the university in its sports program history.

== Road to the final ==
The NCAA Division I women's soccer tournament, sometimes known as the College Cup, is an American intercollegiate soccer tournament conducted by the National Collegiate Athletic Association (NCAA), and determines the Division I women's national champion. The tournament has been formally held since 1982, when it was a twelve-team tournament.

North Carolina (ACC)		Round	Stanford (Pac-12)	
Opponent	Result	NCAA Tournament	Opponent	Result
Belmont (MSV)	5–0 (A)	First round	Prairie View A&M (SWAC)	15–0 (H)
Colorado (Pac-12)	1–0 (A)	Second round	Hofstra (CAA)	4–0 (H)
Michigan (Big 10)	4–0 (A)	Round of 16	Penn State (Big 10)	2–0 (H)
USC (Pac-12)	3–2 (A)	Quarterfinal	BYU (WCC)	5–1 (H)
Washington State (Pac-12)	2–1 (N)	Semifinal	UCLA (Pac-12)	4–1 (N)

== Match details ==
December 8, 2019
5:30 p.m. PST

North Carolina	0–0 (a.e.t.)	Stanford
	Report
Penalties
Otto (penalty missed); Jones (penalty scored); Dickey (penalty scored); Russo (penalty scored); Wubben-Moy (penalty scored); Hansen (penalty missed)	4–5	(penalty scored) Macario; (penalty scored) Smith; (penalty scored) Girma; (penalty missed) Malatskey; (penalty scored) Wesley; (penalty scored) Pickett

Avaya Stadium, San Jose, CA
Attendance: 9,591
Referee: Tori Penso

North Carolina
Stanford

GK	0	(United States) Claudia Dickey
DF	4	(United States) Bridgette Andrzejewski
DF	25	(United States) Maycee Bell
DF	23	(England) Lotte Wubben-Moy
DF	7	(United States) Julia Dorsey
MF	10	(United States) Rachel Jones	(substituted off) 34' (substituted on) 45' (substituted off) 62' (substituted on) 75'
MF	14	(United States) Morgan Goff	(substituted off) 34' (substituted on) 45' (substituted off) 62'
MF	8	(United States) Brianna Pinto	(substituted off) 34' (substituted on) 45' (substituted off) 62' (substituted on) 75'
FW	13	(United States) Isabel Cox	(substituted off) 34' (substituted on) 45' (substituted off) 62' (substituted on) 75'
FW	6	(United States) Taylor Otto	(substituted off) 34' (substituted on) 45' (substituted off) 62' (substituted on) 75'
FW	19	(England) Alessia Russo	(substituted off) 34' (substituted on) 45' (substituted off) 62' (substituted on) 75'
Substitutions:
FW	3	(Zimbabwe) Ru Mucherera	(substituted on) 34' (substituted off) 45' (substituted on) 62'
FW	1	(United States) Madison Schultz	(substituted on) 34' (substituted off) 45' (substituted on) 62' (substituted off) 71'
MF	28	(United States) Maggie Pierce	(substituted on) 34' (substituted off) 45' (substituted on) 62' (substituted off) 75'
FW	12	(United States) Alexis Strickland	(substituted on) 34' (substituted off) 45' (substituted on) 62' (substituted off) 75'
FW	15	(United States) Zoe Redei	(substituted on) 34' (substituted off) 45' (substituted on) 62' (substituted off) 75'
MF	16	(United States) Aleigh Gambone	(substituted on) 34' (substituted off) 45' (substituted on) 62' (substituted off) 75'
DF	xx	(England) Lois Joel	(substituted on) 71' (substituted on) 75'
DF	xx	(United States) Tori Hansen	(substituted on) xx'
Manager:
(United States) Anson Dorrance

GK	19	(United States) Katie Meyer
DF	23	(United States) Kiki Pickett
DF	17	(United States) Sam Hiatt	(substituted off) 45'
DF	2	(United States) Naomi Girma
DF	15	(United States) Kennedy Wesley
MF	10	(United States) Maya Doms	(substituted off) 25' (substituted on) 45' (substituted off) 72'
MF	4	(United States) Belle Briede	(substituted off) 37' (substituted on) 45' (substituted off) 77'
MF	20	(United States) Catarina Macario
FW	9	(United States) Sophia Smith
FW	3	(United States) Madison Haley	(substituted off) 34' (substituted on) 45'
FW	6	(United States) Carly Malatskey	(substituted off) 37' (substituted on) 45' (substituted off) 62'
Substitutions:
FW	24	(United States) Abby Greubel	(substituted on) 25' (substituted off) 45' (substituted on) 72'
MF	16	(Australia) Beattie Goad	(substituted on) 34' (substituted off) 45' (substituted on) 62'
FW	18	(United States) Sam Tran	(substituted on) 37'
MF	5	(United States) Sierra Enge	(substituted on) 37' (substituted off) 45' (substituted on) 77'
Manager:
(United States) Paul Ratcliffe

College Cup MVP
Offensive:
Defensive:

Assistant referees:
Deleana Quan (United States)
Salma Perez (United States)
Fourth official:
Sam Bilbo (United States)

Match rules:

- 90 minutes.
- 20 minutes of extra time if necessary.
- Penalty shoot-out if scores still level.
- Unlimited substitutes, may not return if subbed out in the first half; may return unlimited times in the second half.

=== Statistics ===
Overall
	North Carolina	Stanford
Goals scored	0	0
Total shots	12	21
Saves	6	4
Corner kicks	3	14
Offsides	3	1
Yellow cards	0	0
Red cards	0	0
