= Mia Gyau =

American soccer player (born 1998)

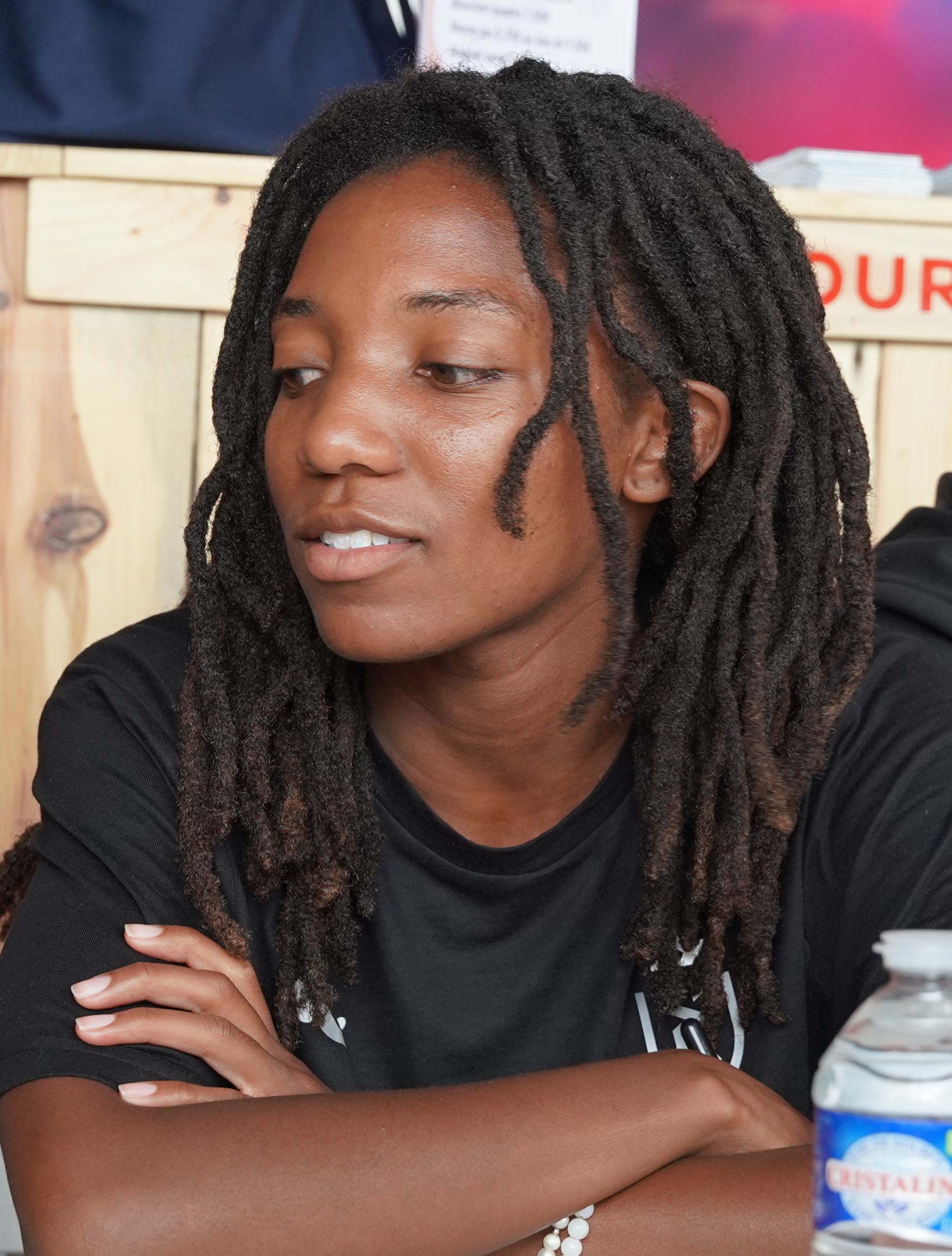
- Gyau in 2024

Personal information
- Full name: Mia Irene Gyau
- Date of birth: June 22, 1998 (age 28)
- Place of birth: Silver Spring, Maryland, U.S.
- Height: 5 ft 4 in (1.63 m)
- Position: Defender

Youth career
- Bethesda Lions

College career
Years	Team	Apps	(Gls)
2016–2021	Duke Blue Devils	59	(3)

Senior career*
Years	Team	Apps	(Gls)
2022–2023	San Diego Wave FC	6	(0)
2024–2025	Reims	25	(0)
- * Club domestic league appearances and goals as of 03:46, December 29, 2025 (UTC)

Mia Irene Gyau (born June 22, 1998) is an American professional soccer player who plays as a defender. She played college soccer for the Duke Blue Devils before playing professionally for San Diego Wave FC of the National Women's Soccer League (NWSL) and in France for Stade de Reims.

== Early life ==
Gyau was born on June 22, 1998, in Silver Spring, Maryland, and is a native of Colesville. She attended Bullis School, where she ran track and set the school record for the 800–meter run and the 3200–meter run. Gyau did not play high school soccer, but she played club soccer with the Bethesda Lions boys team. She was a three-time NSCAA Youth All-America selection and was ranked seventh place overall in TopDrawerSoccer.com's class of 2016 list.

== College career ==
Gyau attended Duke University and majored in evolutionary anthropology. In her freshman year at Duke, she played in all 23 games for the Blue Devils and scored one goal. The next three years of Gyau's college career would be riddled with injury. In her second season, Gyau tore her ACL and MCL, sidelining her for the majority of the season. She ended up only appearing in three games and playing 216 minutes across the time period.

Following a smooth surgery and recovery, Gyau returned to the field for her junior year, only to tear her right Achilles tendon three matches back from her knee injury. Gyau underwent three surgeries to repair her Achilles and did not play for the remainder of her third season at Duke. In her senior year, Gyau played in 9 games and scored her second collegiate goal on September 26, 2019. Once again, her season was cut short after she tore her left Achilles tendon in a match against the University of North Carolina.

In her fifth and final year of college, Gyau played in 21 games, starting each one. She scored one goal and played a college-high 1,737 minutes of soccer. Gyau finished her college career with 59 games played and 3 goals.

== Club career ==
=== San Diego Wave ===
On January 16, 2022, Gyau was signed by NWSL club San Diego Wave FC ahead of the team's inaugural season. Gyau made her professional debut on May 1, 2022, coming on as a substitute for Christen Westphal in a 1–0 victory over the Houston Dash. During the match, Gyau served up a cross that was flicked on by Katie Johnson and then kicked into the back of the net by Jodie Taylor, marking the Wave's first-ever regular season goal. Gyau went on to play sporadically, appearing in a total of 5 matches for the Wave during the 2022 NWSL Season and playing 137 minutes.

During the Wave's 2023 campaign, Gyau played one minute of the regular season, in a May 20 game against Houston. She found more playing time in the 2022 NWSL Challenge Cup, where she made two starts in the competition. First, Gyau played a full 90 minutes in a 3–0 defeat to the OL Reign on May 31, 2023. In her second career Challenge Cup appearance, Gyau played 45 minutes in a 2–1 loss to Angel City FC on June 28, 2023. During the away match, Gyau made a goal-line clearance in the 36th minute that prevented Angel City from scoring into the open net. The defeat would be her final game with the San Diego Wave. On November 21, 2023, the Wave waived Gyau as part of the club's end-of-season roster decisions. Gyau ended her time in San Diego having played in 6 regular season games and 2 cup matches.

=== Stade de Reims ===
In January 2024, French club Stade de Reims signed Gyau on a contract through 2025. Gyau arrived in Marne at the tail end of January and made her club debut with Reims on February 9, 2024, in a 3–0 defeat to Montpellier. In the game, Gyau came on as a substitute in the 76th minute for teammate Jade Rastocle. Later on in the campaign, Gyau played a full match in Reims' playoff defeat to Lyon on May 12, 2024. She also started in the third-place playoff, which ended up being a defeat to Paris FC on penalty kicks. Despite joining Reims midway through the season, Gyau ended her first year in France with 8 league appearances and 802 minutes in all competitions.

== International career ==
Gyau has represented the United States as a member of several different youth national teams. She trained with the U-14 and U-15 teams as a teenager and was a member of the U-17, U-18, and U-20 teams.

== Personal life ==
Gyau's father, Phillip Gyau, is a former professional soccer player and played in six games for the United States men's national soccer team. Her brother, Joe Gyau, plays for the Las Vegas Lights and has three international caps.

== Career statistics ==
=== Club ===
As of December 28, 2025

Club	Season	League			Cup (Note: Includes the NWSL Challenge Cup and the Coupe de France féminine)		Playoffs (Note: Includes NWSL Playoffs and Première Ligue Playoffs)		Total	
Club	Season	Division	Apps	Goals	Apps	Goals	Apps	Goals	Apps	Goals
San Diego Wave FC	2022	NWSL	5	0	0	0	0	0	5	0
San Diego Wave FC	2023	NWSL	1	0	2	0	0	0	3	0
San Diego Wave FC	Total		6	0	2	0	0	0	8	0
Stade de Reims	2023–24	Première Ligue	8	0	0	0	2	0	10	0
Stade de Reims	2024–25	Première Ligue	17	0	2	0	—		19	0
Stade de Reims	Total		25	0	0	0	2	0	29	0
Career total			31	0	4	0	2	0	37	0

== Honors ==
San Diego Wave

- NWSL Shield: 2023
