= Naomi Girma =

American soccer player (born 2000)

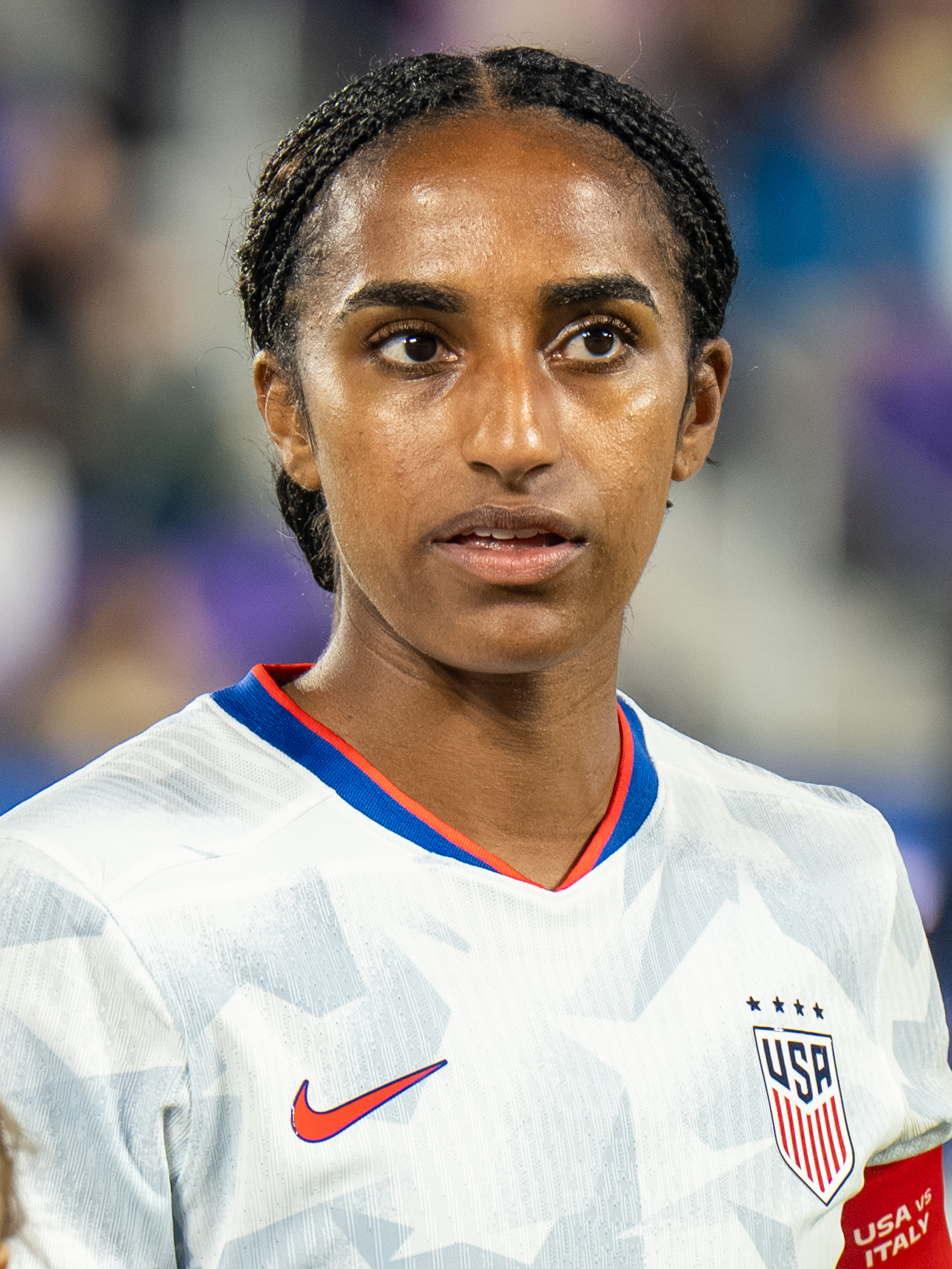
- Girma with the United States in 2025

Personal information
- Full name: Naomi Haile Girma
- Date of birth: June 14, 2000 (age 26)
- Place of birth: San Jose, California, U.S.
- Height: 5 ft 6 in (1.68 m)
- Position: Center back

Team information
- Current team: Chelsea
- Number: 4

Youth career
- 2010–2017: Central Valley Crossfire
- 2015–2018: Pioneer HS Mustangs
- 2016–2018: De Anza Force
- 2016–2018: California Thorns FC

College career
Years	Team	Apps	(Gls)
2018–2021	Stanford Cardinal	68	(8)

Senior career*
Years	Team	Apps	(Gls)
2022–2024	San Diego Wave	61	(0)
2025–	Chelsea	15	(1)

International career^{‡}
2016	United States U17		
2017	United States U19		
2017–2020	United States U20		
2022–	United States	54	(3)
Medal record
Women's soccer
Representing the United States
Olympic Games
Gold medal – first place	2024 Paris	Team
CONCACAF W Gold Cup
Winner	2024 United States
CONCACAF W Championship
Winner	2022 Mexico
- * Club domestic league appearances and goals as of March 29, 2026 ‡ National team caps and goals as of April 17, 2026

Naomi Haile Girma (born June 14, 2000) is an American professional soccer player who plays as a center back for Women's Super League club Chelsea and the United States national team.

Girma played college soccer for the Stanford Cardinal, which she captained to the 2019 national championship. San Diego Wave FC selected her first overall in the 2022 NWSL Draft. She won NWSL Rookie of the Year and was named NWSL Defender of the Year in both of her first two seasons, helping lead San Diego to the NWSL Shield in 2023. In 2025, she signed with Chelsea for a reported $1.1 million transfer fee, a women's soccer world record.

Girma played for the United States at the under-17, under-19, and under-20 levels before making her senior debut in 2022. She was named U.S. Soccer Female Player of the Year in 2023. She won gold with the United States at the 2024 Paris Olympics, playing every minute of the tournament.

== Early life ==
Girma was born in San Jose, California, to parents Girma Aweke and Seble Demissie, both Ethiopian immigrants who met in the Bay Area. She has one brother, Nathaniel, who is three years older. Her family speaks both Amharic and English. In her youth, Girma played for Maleda Soccer Club, a local club which her father coached. She attended Hacienda Elementary School and YMCA after-school basketball matches, following in her brother's footsteps in sports. She also practiced gymnastics for five years before settling on soccer in middle school.

Girma joined local youth club Central Valley Crossfire between the ages of 9 and 17. Playing under Crossfire coach Bob Joyce, Girma was encouraged to participate in Olympic Development Program events and was called into the United States under-14 national team camp. She subsequently became a guest player for De Anza Force, and also played for the California Thorns Academy and Pioneer High School. She committed to play college soccer at Stanford University when she was a sophomore. She was ranked by TopDrawerSoccer as the fifth-best college prospect of the 2018 class and part of Stanford's top-ranked cohort alongside Sophia Smith.

== College career ==
Girma played all but one game for the Stanford Cardinal in her freshman season in 2018, making 23 appearances (22 starts), featuring alongside senior Alana Cook in central defense. The reigning national champions finished the regular season undefeated, claiming the Pac-12 Conference for the fourth time in a row. In the NCAA tournament, Girma played every minute for No. 1–seeded Stanford, scoring her first two college goals in their 4–1 win against Ole Miss in the second round, as they reached the semifinals, losing 2–0 to eventual champions No. 1 Florida State. She was named to the All-Pac-12 third team, Pac-12 all-freshman team, and TopDrawerSoccer Freshman Best XI first team at the end of the season.

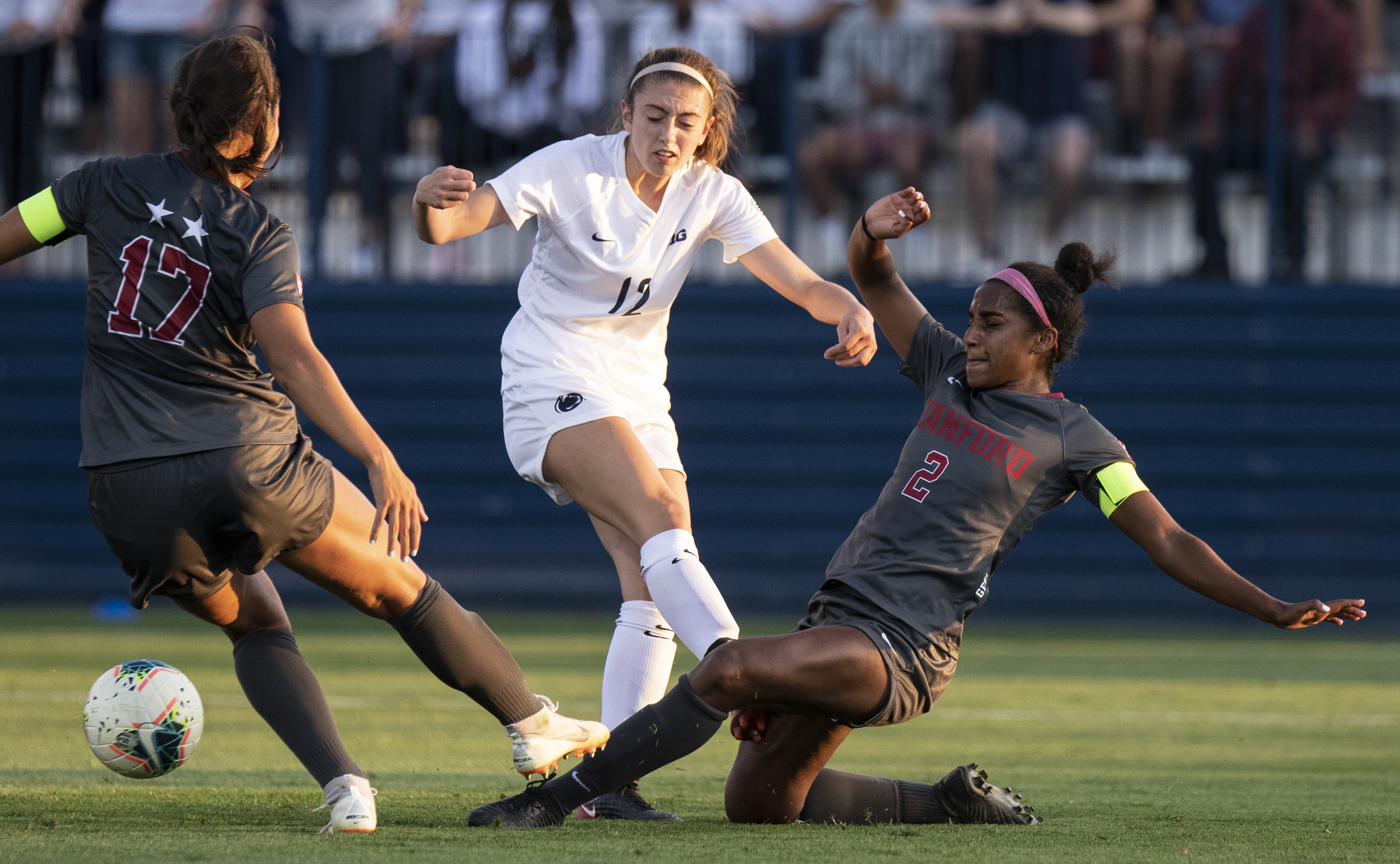
Girma (right) playing for Stanford in 2019

Girma became team captain and started all 25 games in her sophomore season in 2019, playing every minute of all but five games, mostly alongside senior Sam Hiatt. Stanford lost only one non-conference game in the regular season on the way to their fifth consecutive Pac-12 championship, with Girma scoring in the last two games of the regular season. In the NCAA tournament, No. 1 seeds Stanford advanced to the title game after a 4–1 win against No. 2 UCLA in the semifinals. Girma helped hold No. 1 North Carolina to a 0–0 draw after extra time, before scoring her penalty kick in the resulting shootout as Stanford goalkeeper Katie Meyer made two penalty saves to bring Stanford their third national title. Girma was named the tournament's Most Outstanding Defensive Player along with earning Pac-12 Defender of the Year, first-team All-Pac-12, and first-team All-American honors.

Girma missed her entire junior season, which was disrupted by the COVID-19 pandemic, after tearing her ACL. During her recovery, she applied to and was accepted into the Mayfield Fellows Program for entrepreneurship at Stanford.

Girma returned to action as a senior in the fall of 2021, starting all 20 games and playing every minute of all but four of them. Stanford finished the season fourth in the Pac-12 Conference, losing to Santa Clara in the first round of the NCAA tournament. Despite the down season, Girma was named Pac-12 Defender of the Year, first-team All-Pac-12, and first-team All-American, all for the second time. Following the season, she decided to forgo her remaining college eligibility and declared for the 2022 NWSL Draft. She graduated with a Bachelor of Arts degree in symbolic systems in 2022 and continued pursuing a master's degree in management science and engineering after becoming a professional soccer player.

== Club career ==
=== San Diego Wave ===
Expansion side San Diego Wave FC selected Girma with the first overall pick of the 2022 NWSL Draft. She made her professional debut in the Wave's inaugural game on March 19, 2022, starting in a 1–1 draw against Angel City FC in the group stage of the NWSL Challenge Cup. She started 19 games in the 2022 regular season, featuring primarily alongside Kaleigh Riehl in central defense after Abby Dahlkemper was injured. San Diego placed third in the league, becoming the first expansion team to qualify for the playoffs in their first season. In the playoffs, they beat the Chicago Red Stars 2–1 in the quarterfinals before losing to the Portland Thorns 2–1 in the semifinals. During her rookie season, Girma was named in the NWSL Best XI of the Month four times and voted NWSL Rookie of the Month two times. She was also named in the end-of-year NWSL Best XI First Team and received both the NWSL Rookie of the Year and NWSL Defender of the Year awards, becoming the first NWSL player to win multiple end-of-year individual awards in her rookie season, and was nominated for NWSL Most Valuable Player, losing to Sophia Smith.

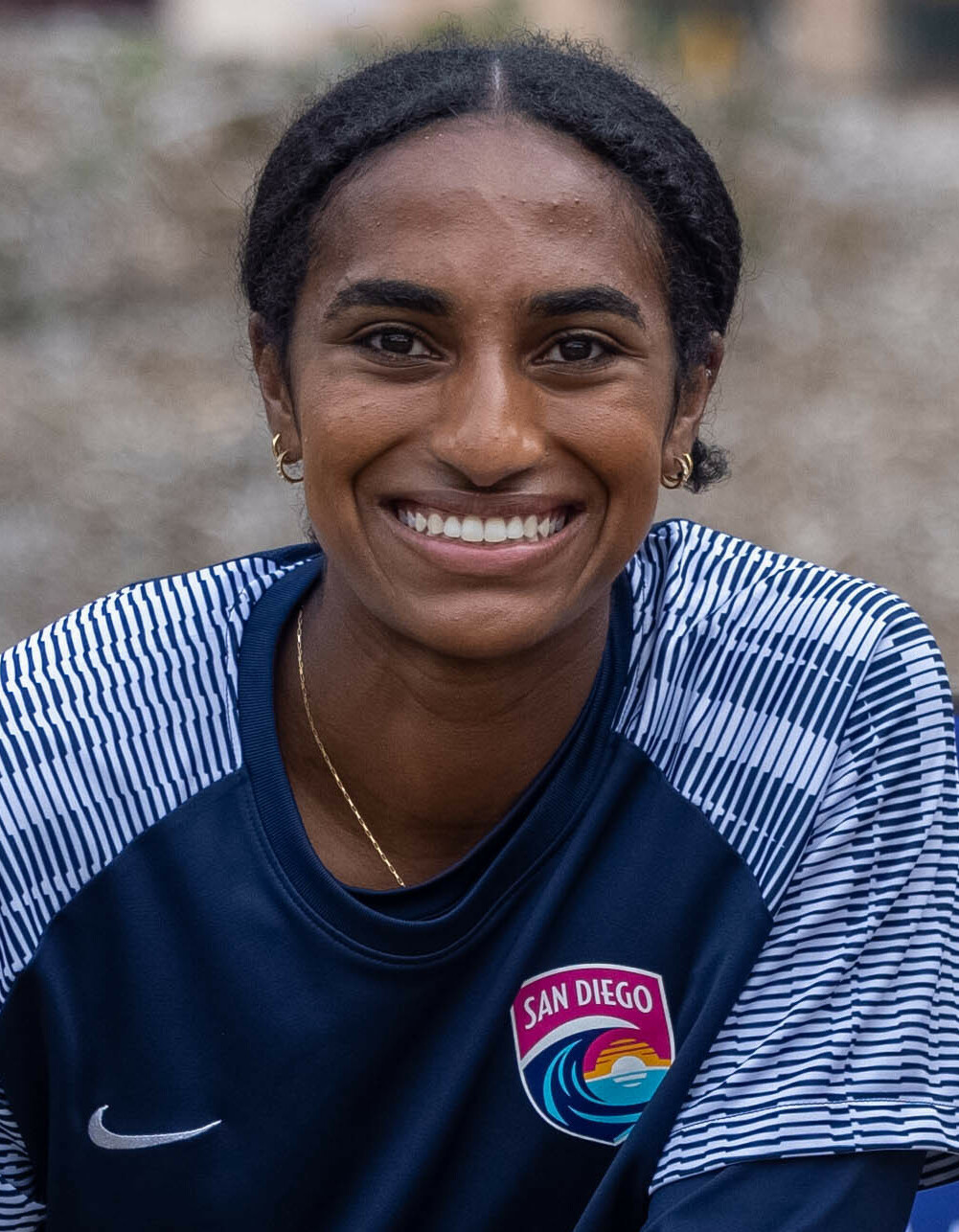
Girma with the Wave in 2023

On June 14, 2023, the Wave announced that they had signed Girma to a new contract through 2026. She started 19 games during the 2023 regular season, helping the team concede only 22 goals throughout the season (second in the NWSL). San Diego won the NWSL Shield with the league's best record, but they lost 1–0 to OL Reign in the semifinals. Girma was named in the NWSL Best XI of the Month three times during the season. At the end of the year, she was named in the NWSL Best XI First Team and won NWSL Defender of the Year for a second year in a row, becoming the second player to win the award multiple times after Becky Sauerbrunn.

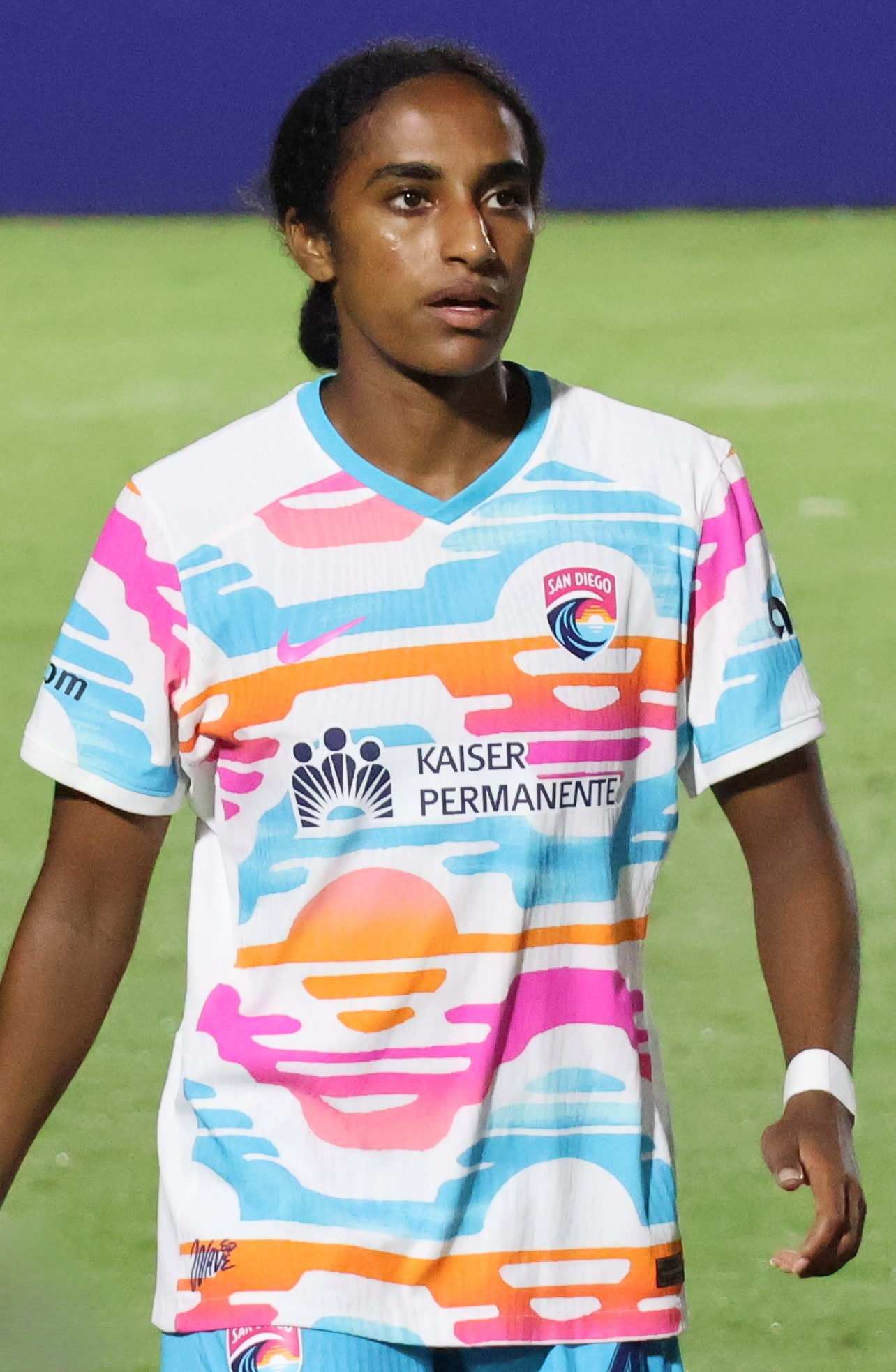
Girma with the Wave in 2024

Girma helped the Shield holders win the season-opening 2024 NWSL Challenge Cup, shutting out defending playoff champions NJ/NY Gotham FC 1–0 on March 17, 2024. She played in a career-high 20 games in the 2024 regular season, but the Wave struggled to repeat their success, finishing 10th of 14 teams and missing the playoffs for the first time. Girma was named to the NWSL Best XI of the Month two times and the NWSL Best XI Second Team at the end of the year, and was again nominated for NWSL Defender of the Year, losing to Emily Sams.

=== Chelsea ===
On January 26, 2025, Women's Super League club Chelsea announced that they had signed Girma on a four-and-a-half-year deal, unveiling her to fans on the same day before their league match against Arsenal at Stamford Bridge. The transfer fee was reported to be approximately $1.1 million (£890,000), breaking the world record for a women's soccer transfer and making Girma the first ever women's player to be sold for over $1 million.

She missed the start of the season due to injury, and made her debut for the club during a 2–2 draw against Brighton & Hove Albion on March 2.

Girma scored her first goal for Chelsea in an FA Cup match against Manchester United on February 22, 2026, scoring in extra time to help Chelsea qualify for the quarterfinals.

== International career ==
External videos
- ESPN: Naomi's Girma's journey to the USWNT retrieved July 23, 2023

Girma has competed on the United States under-17, under-19 and under-20 and senior national teams. She captained the under-20 team to win the 2020 CONCACAF Women's U-20 Championship under head coach Laura Harvey. In December 2020, Girma won the 2020 U.S. Soccer Young Female Player of the Year award.

Girma received her first call-up to the United States senior team in December 2019 but had to withdraw due to injury. She was called up again in October 2020. She debuted for the senior national team on April 12, 2022, in an international friendly against Uzbekistan. She also appeared in the 2022 CONCACAF W Championship, and registered an assist on a goal by Sophia Smith against Jamaica during the tournament.

In June 2023, Girma was named to the US squad for the 2023 FIFA Women's World Cup in Australia and New Zealand. She was a starting defender during the team's first group stage match against Vietnam: a 3–0 shutout. During the first half, she started the sequence that led to the U.S.' second goal by lobbing the ball into the box to Alex Morgan who headed it to scorer Sophia Smith. Girma was named U.S. Soccer's 2023 Female Player of the Year, becoming the first defender to win the award in its history as she was a part of a defense that allowed an average of just 0.17 goals per game during the year, the best in team history.

In 2024, Girma was called up to represent the US at the inaugural 2024 CONCACAF W Gold Cup and 2024 SheBelieves Cup. Girma was selected to the 18-player roster for the 2024 Summer Olympics in France. She was widely praised throughout the tournament as the team's most important player. She was the only field player to play every minute of the tournament through to the gold medal game against Brazil, which the United States won 1–0 on a goal from Mallory Swanson. She scored her first and second international goals in a friendly match against Argentina on October 30, 2024, in Louisville, Kentucky.

In January 2025 she pulled out of the US squad due to injury.

== Style of play ==
Considered one of the best center backs in the world, Girma is known for her composure, intelligence, and leadership. She was previously a central or defensive midfielder in her youth before being converted to center back at a youth national team camp. She anticipates play and positions herself well to thwart attackers and can use her speed to beat opponents one-on-one. She has good technical ability and passes well to set up plays. In 2024, United States head coach Emma Hayes said Girma was "the best defender I've ever seen".

In December 2024 she was voted by The Guardian at the 10th place among the top 100 women's soccer players in the world.

== Career statistics ==
=== Club ===
As of match played September 2, 2026

Appearances and goals by club, season and competition
Club	Season	League			National cup (Note: includes Women's FA Cup)		League cup (Note: includes NWSL Challenge Cup, Women's League Cup)		Continental		Other		Total	
Club	Season	Division	Apps	Goals	Apps	Goals	Apps	Goals	Apps	Goals	Apps	Goals	Apps	Goals
San Diego Wave FC	2022	NWSL	19	0	—		6	0	—		2 (Note: Appearance(s) in the NWSL Playoffs)	0	27	0
San Diego Wave FC	2023	NWSL	19	0	—		2	0	—		1	0	22	0
San Diego Wave FC	2024	NWSL	23	0	—		—		2 (Note: Appearance(s) in CONCACAF W Champions Cup)	0	1 (Note: Appearance(s) in NWSL Challenge Cup, cup format changed to a single-game supercup tournament)	0	26	0
San Diego Wave FC	Total		61	0	0	0	8	0	2	0	4	0	75	0
Chelsea	2024–25	Women's Super League	5	0	1	0	0	0	2 (Note: Appearance(s) in UEFA Women's Champions League)	0	—		8	0
Chelsea	2025–26	Women's Super League	10	1	3	1	1	0	4	0	—		18	2
Chelsea	2026–27	Women's Super League	0	0	0	0	—		2	1	—		2	1
Chelsea	Total		15	1	4	1	1	0	8	1	0	0	28	3
Career total			76	1	4	1	9	0	10	1	4	0	103	3

=== International ===
As of match played April 17, 2026

National Team	Year	Apps	Goals
United States	2022	10	0
United States	2023	16	0
United States	2024	18	2
United States	2025	6	0
United States	2026	4	1
Total		54	3

International goals scored by Naomi Girma
No.	Cap	Date	Venue	Opponent	Score	Result	Competition	Ref.
1	42	October 30, 2024	Lynn Family Stadium, Louisville, Kentucky, U.S.	Argentina	1–0	3–0	Friendly	
2	42	October 30, 2024	Lynn Family Stadium, Louisville, Kentucky, U.S.	Argentina	3–0	3–0	Friendly	
3	54	April 17, 2026	Dick's Sporting Goods Park, Commerce City, Colorado, U.S.	Japan	1–0	3–0	Friendly	

== Honors ==
Stanford Cardinal

- NCAA Division I women's soccer tournament: 2019

San Diego Wave

- NWSL Shield: 2023
- NWSL Challenge Cup: 2024

Chelsea

- Women's Super League: 2024–25
- Women's FA Cup: 2024–25
- Women's League Cup: 2025–26

United States U17

- CONCACAF Women's U-17 Championship: 2016

United States U20

- CONCACAF Women's U-20 Championship: 2020

United States

- Summer Olympic Games Gold Medal: 2024
- CONCACAF Women's Championship: 2022
- CONCACAF W Gold Cup: 2024
- SheBelieves Cup: 2023,2024, 2026

Individual

- CONCACAF W Championship Best XI: 2022
- U.S. Soccer Player of the Year: 2023
- U.S. Soccer Young Female Player of the Year: 2020
- NWSL Defender of the Year: 2022, 2023
- NWSL Rookie of the Year: 2022
- NWSL Best XI: 2022, 2023
- NWSL Second XI: 2024
- NWSL Team of the Month: May 2022, June 2022, August 2022, September/October 2022, March/April 2023, May 2023, September/October 2023, March/April 2024, September 2024
- NWSL Rookie of the Month: June 2022 September/October 2022
- NCAA Division I Tournament Most Outstanding Defensive Player: 2019
- Pac-12 Defender of the Year: 2019, 2021
- The Best FIFA Women's 11: 2024
- ESPN FC Women's Rank: #2 on the 2024 list of 50 best women's soccer players
- IFFHS Women's World Team: 2024
