= Amirah Ali =

American soccer player (born 1998)

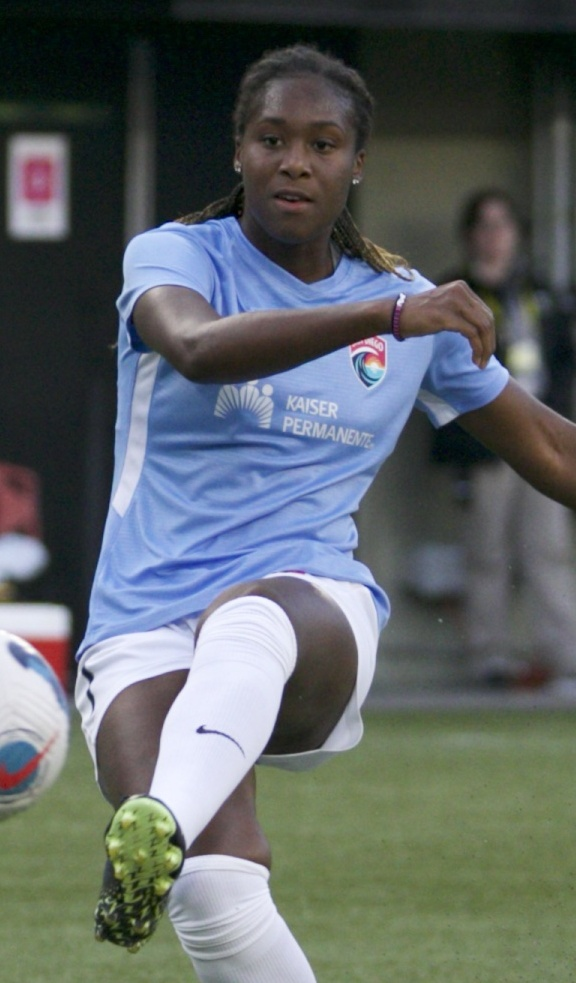
- Ali with the San Diego Wave in 2022

Personal information
- Full name: Amirah Iman Ali
- Date of birth: December 7, 1998 (age 27)
- Place of birth: Voorhees Township, New Jersey
- Height: 5 ft 8 in (1.73 m)
- Positions: Forward; midfielder

Team information
- Current team: Piteå IF
- Number: 7

Youth career
- Winslow Tigers
- Players Development Academy

College career
| Years | Team | Apps | (Gls) |
| 2017–2021 | Rutgers Scarlet Knights | 103 | (44) |

Senior career*
| Years | Team | Apps | (Gls) |
| 2022–2024 | San Diego Wave | 48 | (5) |
| 2025 | Valencia CF | 13 | (0) |
| 2025– | Piteå IF | 0 | (0) |
- * Club domestic league appearances and goals as of 17:00, August 6, 2025 (UTC)

Amirah Iman Ali (born December 7, 1998) is an American professional soccer player who plays as a forward for Damallsvenskan club Piteå IF. Ali played college soccer for the Rutgers Scarlet Knights, where she was a four-time All-American selection. She was drafted 22nd overall by the Portland Thorns in the 2021 NWSL Draft, but started her professional career with San Diego Wave FC after returning to Rutgers for a fifth year.

== Early life ==
Ali, born in Voorhees Township and raised in Winslow Township, New Jersey, played youth soccer for the Winslow Tigers, a New Jersey–based travel team coached by Rich King, the father of NWSL player Tziarra King. In Ali's later youth years, she joined Players Development Academy of the Elite Clubs National League prior to going to Rutgers University.

Ali played high school soccer for Eastern Regional High School in her hometown of Voorhees Township, New Jersey, where she was named High School Girls' Player of the Year by both the National Soccer Coaches Association of America, the Courier-Post, and the United Soccer Coaches. She finished her high school career with 99 goals and 51 assists.

== College career ==
Ali played for the Rutgers Scarlet Knights from 2017 to 2021, primarily as a forward or attacking midfielder. The Scarlet Knights won their first-ever Big Ten Conference championship in 2021 with Ali on the squad, and she was on the shortlist for the MAC Hermann Trophy in 2019, 2020, and 2021.

In 2021, Ali exercised her extra year of college eligibility and lead Rutgers to the 2021 NCAA Division I Women's Soccer Tournament, the program's first appearance since 2015. The Scarlet Knights finished as semi-finalists.

Ali finished her Rutgers career with 44 goals, 17 of them match-winners, and 19 assists. She scored nine career golden goals, a Rutgers record, and played 6,309 minutes across 103 matches, 102 of them as a starter. Ali finished her career at Rutgers as the program's only four-time all-American. She was a team captain in 2019, 2020, and 2021.

== Club career ==
Portland Thorns FC drafted Ali with the 22nd overall pick in the 2021 NWSL Draft, despite her decision not to declare for the draft. Thorns coach Mark Parsons suggested Ali was capable of playing immediately for an NWSL club. She instead returned to Rutgers to complete her collegiate career.

=== San Diego Wave FC ===
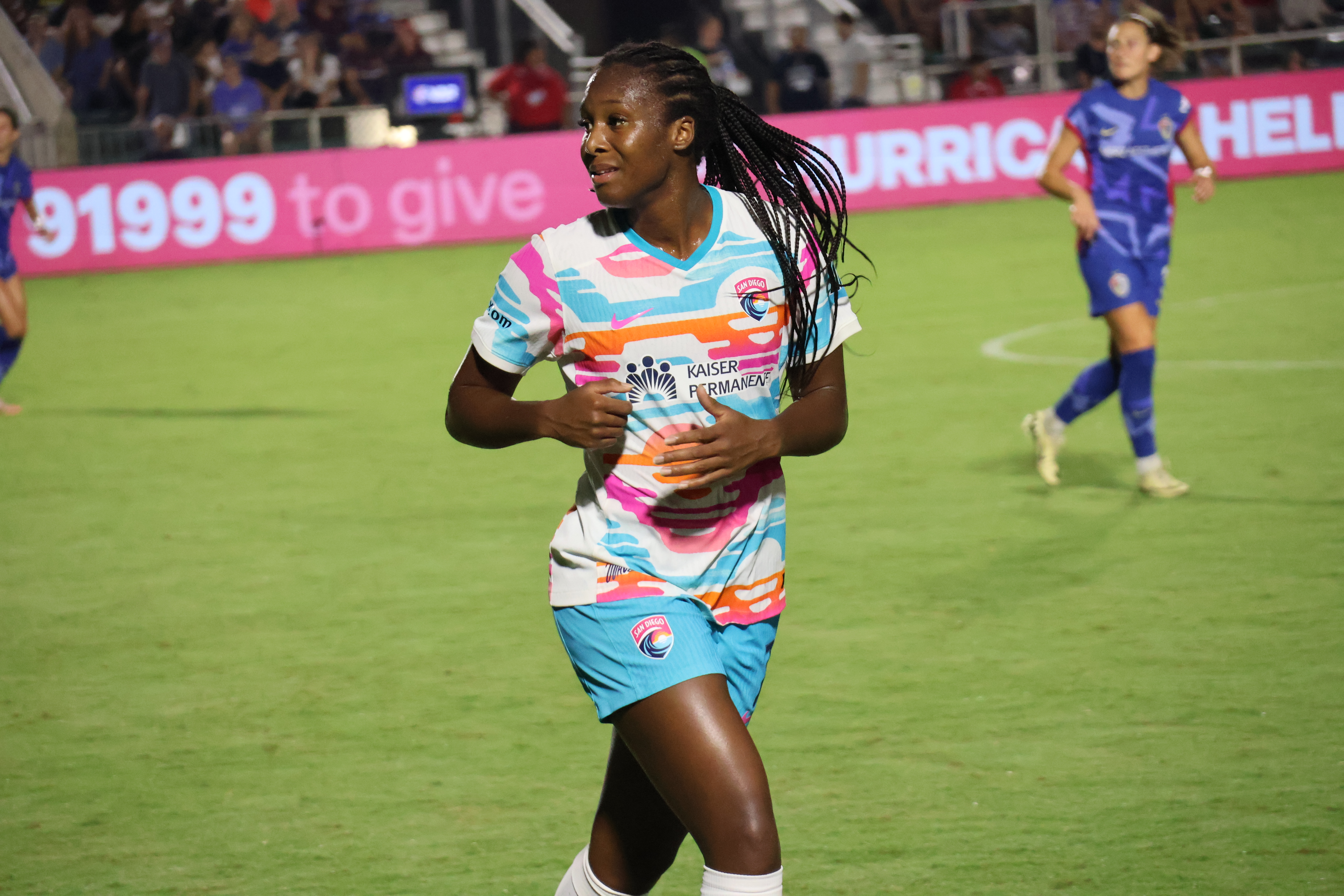
Ali with the Wave in 2024

Portland traded the NWSL player rights to Ali, as well as defender Christen Westphal, to San Diego Wave in exchange for $50,000 in allocation money on December 16, 2021. Ali scored her first professional goal on April 2, 2022, during the 2022 NWSL Challenge Cup against Angel City FC.

Prior to 2024, Ali re-signed with the Wave for an additional season. During the NWSL x Liga MX Femenil Summer Cup, Ali participated in a penalty shootout between the Wave and Angel City FC. She was the only player on either team to have their kick saved, resulting in Angel City winning the shootout and advancing to the knockout stage of the competition. On September 14, 2024, Ali scored the opening goal 27 seconds into a 2–1 victory over the Utah Royals. The goal, her first of the season, became the Wave's fastest-ever goal in club history. At the end of the 2024 season, Ali was out of contract with the Wave. The club later announced that Ali would not be returning to San Diego and would instead be exploring opportunities as a free agent. She had made 48 league appearances and scored 5 goals in her tenure with the Wave.

=== Valencia CF ===
On January 13, 2025, Ali signed with Liga F club Valencia CF to a two-year contract until 2026. She made 13 appearances (5 starts) in her sole season with Valencia.

=== Piteå IF ===
Ali signed with Swedish club Piteå IF on August 6, 2025. The move reunited her with former San Diego Wave teammate Lauren Brzykcy.

== International career ==
Ali played for the United States under-19 national team and was invited to U14, U18, and U19 camps.

== Career statistics ==
=== Club ===
As of January 13, 2025

Appearances and goals by club, season and competition
| Club | Season | League | | | Cup (Note: Includes the NWSL Challenge Cup) | | Playoffs (Note: Includes NWSL Playoffs) | | Continental (Note: Includes CONCACAF W Champions Cup) | | Other | | Total | |
| Club | Season | Division | Apps | Goals | Apps | Goals | Apps | Goals | Apps | Goals | Apps | Goals | Apps | Goals |
|---|---|---|---|---|---|---|---|---|---|---|---|---|---|---|
| San Diego Wave FC | 2022 | NWSL | 18 | 2 | 6 | 1 | 2 | 0 | — | | — | | 26 | 3 |
| San Diego Wave FC | 2023 | NWSL | 16 | 2 | 4 | 0 | 1 | 0 | — | | — | | 21 | 2 |
| San Diego Wave FC | 2024 | NWSL | 14 | 1 | 1 | 0 | — | | 3 | 1 | 3 (Note: Includes NWSL x Liga MX Femenil Summer Cup) | 1 | 21 | 3 |
| San Diego Wave FC | Total | | 48 | 5 | 11 | 1 | 3 | 0 | 3 | 1 | 3 | 1 | 68 | 8 |
| Valencia CF | 2024–25 | Liga F | 13 | 0 | — | | — | | — | | — | | 13 | 0 |
| Piteå IF | 2025 | Damallsvenskan | 0 | 0 | 0 | 0 | — | | — | | — | | 0 | 0 |
| Career total | | | 61 | 5 | 11 | 1 | 3 | 0 | 3 | 1 | 3 | 1 | 81 | 8 |

== Honors ==
San Diego Wave

- NWSL Shield: 2023
- NWSL Challenge Cup: 2024

Rutgers Scarlet Knights

- All-Big Ten Team (third team 2017; first team 2018, 2019, 2020, 2021)
- All-American Team (second team 2018; first team 2019, 2020; third team 2021)
- NCAA College Cup All-Tournament Team (2021)
- MAC Hermann Trophy candidate (2021) and semi-finalist (2020)
