= Chai Cortez =

American soccer player (born 1998)

Personal information
- Full name: Chai Losalea Cortez
- Date of birth: July 18, 1998 (age 28)
- Height: 5 ft 3 in (1.60 m)
- Position: Left back

Youth career
- Hawaii Surf

College career
| Years | Team | Apps | (Gls) |
| 2018–2022 | Oregon Ducks | 79 | (1) |

Senior career*
| Years | Team | Apps | (Gls) |
| 2023 | San Diego Wave | 2 | (0) |
| 2024 | San Diego Wave | 0 | (0) |
- * Club domestic league appearances and goals as of December 25, 2024

Chai Losalea Cortez (born July 18, 1998) is an American former professional soccer player who played as a left back. She played college soccer for the Oregon Ducks before spending two professional stints with San Diego Wave FC of the National Women's Soccer League (NWSL).

== Early life ==
Cortez grew up in Kahului, Hawaii, alongside three sisters. Cortez's oldest sister, Kylie, was a college soccer player who starred for the Chaminade Silverswords. As a teenager, Cortez attended Lokelani Intermediate school and Maui High School. She led Maui High School in scoring during her last three years of education and was named to the all-league first team. Cortez also played club soccer for the Hawaii Surf, where she helped the team win two club championships.

== College career ==
In 2018, Cortez started playing with the Oregon Ducks. She started all 19 of Oregon's games in two seasons and earned All-Pac-12 Third Team and Defensive Player of the Week honors in 2021. She scored her only collegiate goal against California on March 26, 2021, converting the match-winner directly off of a corner kick. Cortez finished her college career in 2022 with 79 appearances and 1 goal recorded. Her 11 assists tied for the seventh-highest in program history.

== Club career ==
During the 2023 NWSL preseason, Cortez joined the Houston Dash's squad as a non-rostered invitee. She ended up sustaining an injury during the Dash's training camp and did not sign with Houston.

On July 27, 2023, Cortez signed her first professional contract with San Diego Wave FC as a national team replacement player, becoming the first Maui Interscholastic League graduate to sign in the NWSL. She made her debut with the Wave on July 8, 2023, starting and playing 60 minutes in a 2–2 draw with the Washington Spirit. Cortez also started in the Wave's very next game, an NWSL Challenge Cup defeat to Portland Thorns FC. Later in July, Wave players who participated in the 2023 FIFA Women's World Cup returned to the club. Subsequently, Cortez moved from a national team replacement contract to an injury replacement contract. She made one more appearance for the Wave before getting released on October 7.

With five Wave players out for the summer in order to compete in the 2024 Olympics, Cortez again signed a national team replacement player contract on July 18. She did not appear for the Wave before she was released in August 2024.

== International career ==
As a middle schooler, Cortez received her first youth international call-up in 2014 to the U-14 national team. She later went on to represent the United States at various other youth levels, including U-16, U-17, and U-18.

== Personal life ==
Cortez gave birth to her first child, a daughter, on June 26, 2026.

== Career statistics ==
=== Club ===
Appearances and goals by club, season, and competition
| Club | Season | League | | | Cup (Note: Includes the NWSL Challenge Cup) | | Playoffs (Note: Includes NWSL Playoffs) | | Other | | Total | |
| Club | Season | Division | Apps | Goals | Apps | Goals | Apps | Goals | Apps | Goals | Apps | Goals |
|---|---|---|---|---|---|---|---|---|---|---|---|---|
| San Diego Wave FC | 2023 | NWSL | 2 | 0 | 1 | 0 | 0 | 0 | — | | 3 | 0 |
| San Diego Wave FC | 2024 | NWSL | 0 | 0 | — | | — | | 0 (Note: Includes NWSL x Liga MX Femenil Summer Cup) | 0 | 0 | 0 |
| Career total | | | 2 | 0 | 1 | 0 | 0 | 0 | 0 | 0 | 3 | 0 |

== Honors ==
San Diego Wave

- NWSL Shield: 2023
