= 2023 San Diego Wave FC season =

San Diego Wave FC 2023 soccer season

2023 season
- Owner: Ron Burkle
- President: Jill Ellis
- Head coach: Casey Stoney
- Stadium: Snapdragon Stadium
- NWSL: 1st (NWSL Shield)
- Challenge Cup: Group stage
- Playoffs: Semifinals
- Top goalscorer: Alex Morgan (6)
- Highest home attendance: 30,854 (vs. CHI, Mar 25)
- Average home league attendance: 20,681
Home colors	Away colors
- All statistics correct as of July 8, 2023.

The 2023 San Diego Wave FC season was the team's second as a professional women's soccer team. The Wave competed in the National Women's Soccer League (NWSL), the top tier of women's soccer in the United States. The Wave finished the season with the best record, earning the NWSL Shield and a first-round bye to the playoff semi-finals where they were eliminated from the postseason.

== Team ==
=== Squad ===
As of October 15, 2023.

No.	Pos.	Nation	Player
1	GK	CAN	Kailen Sheridan
2	DF	USA	Abby Dahlkemper
3	FW	USA	Rachel Hill
4	DF	USA	Naomi Girma
5	MF	AUS	Emily van Egmond
6	FW	USA	Kelsey Turnbow
7	FW	USA	Amirah Ali
8	MF	USA	Sierra Enge
10	FW	SWE	Sofia Jakobsson
11	FW	USA	Jaedyn Shaw
12	MF	USA	Giovanna DeMarco
13	FW	USA	Alex Morgan
14	DF	USA	Kristen McNabb
15	MF	USA	Makenzy Doniak
16	DF	USA	Madison Pogarch
17	GK	USA	Lauren Brzykcy
18	DF	USA	Kaleigh Riehl
19	FW	USA	Kyra Carusa
20	DF	USA	Christen Westphal
22	MF	USA	Taylor Kornieck
23	MF	USA	Belle Briede
24	MF	USA	Danielle Colaprico
25	FW	USA	Melanie Barcenas
26	DF	USA	Mia Gyau
28	MF	USA	Meggie Dougherty Howard
30	GK	USA	Shae Yáñez

=== Coaching staff ===
As of October 16, 2023.

Position	Staff
Head Coach	Casey Stoney
Assistant Coach	Jackie Bachteler
Assistant Coach / Head of Goalkeeping	Louis Hunt
Technical and Development Coach	Craig Barclay
Tactical Coach Analyst	Chris Loxston

== Competitions ==
=== Regular season ===
March 25 1	San Diego Wave FC	3–2	Chicago Red Stars	San Diego, California
7:00 pm	Ali 22'; Shaw 32'; Kornieck (yellow card) 58'; Morgan 89' (pen.)	Report	Nagasato 18'; Swanson 45+4' (pen.); Davidson (yellow card) 49'; Wright (yellow card) 88'	Stadium: Snapdragon Stadium; Attendance: 30,854; Referee: Elton Garcia

April 1 2	San Diego Wave FC	3–1	North Carolina Courage	San Diego, California
7:00 pm	Shaw 39'; McNabb (yellow card) 42'; Morgan 48' (Colaprico), 73' (pen.)	Report	Gejl (yellow card) 55'; Pickett (yellow card) 67'; Kerolin 77' (pen.)	Stadium: Snapdragon Stadium; Attendance: 17,000; Referee: JC Griggs

April 15 3	OL Reign	1–0	San Diego Wave FC	Seattle, Washington
7:00 pm	Van der Jagt 90+5'	Report	Hill (yellow card) 90+4'	Stadium: Lumen Field; Attendance: 9,219; Referee: Tori Penso

April 23 4	Angel City FC	0–2	San Diego Wave FC	Los Angeles, California
5:00 pm		Report	Ali (yellow card) 24'; Hill (yellow card) 56'; Jakobsson 70' (Westphal); Doniak 75' (Morgan)	Stadium: BMO Stadium; Attendance: 22,000; Referee: Katja Koroleva

April 29 5	San Diego Wave FC	1–3	Orlando Pride	San Diego, California
7:00 pm	Shaw 12' (Doniak); Colaprico (yellow card) 52'	Report	Cluff; Montefusco (yellow card) 27'; McCutcheon 42' (Villacorta); Adriana 69' (Tymrak)	Stadium: Snapdragon Stadium; Attendance: 16,225; Referee: Brad Jensen

May 6 6	Washington Spirit	3–1	San Diego Wave FC	Buzzard Point, Washington D.C.
10:00 am	Carle (yellow card) 26'; Rodman 55'; Sanchez 70' (Rodman); Metayer 79' (Staab)	Report	Westphal (yellow card) 27'; Morgan 90'	Stadium: Audi Field; Attendance: 12,232; Referee: Matthew Thompson

May 14 7	Kansas City Current	0–2	San Diego Wave FC	Kansas City, Kansas
3:00 pm	Robinson (yellow card) 74'	Report	Franch 26' (o.g.); Briede 44' (Westphal); Enge (yellow card) 56'; McNabb (yellow card) 59'	Stadium: Children's Mercy Park; Attendance: 12,969; Referee: Danielle Chesky

May 20 8	Houston Dash	0–3	San Diego Wave FC	Houston, Texas
5:30 pm	Jacobs (yellow card) 13'; Dydasco (yellow card) 39'; Anderson (yellow card) 89'	Report	Morgan 2'; Colaprico (yellow card) 35'; Enge 58' (Jakobsson); Pogarch 79' (Morgan)	Stadium: Shell Energy Stadium; Attendance: 5,966; Referee: Elijio Arreguin

May 26 9	San Diego Wave FC	1–1	Portland Thorns FC	San Diego, California
7:00 pm	Kornieck (yellow card) 77'; McNabb (yellow card) 83'; Jakobsson 86'	Report	Smith (yellow card) 20'; Reyes 90' (Coffey)	Stadium: Snapdragon Stadium; Attendance: 18,130; Referee: Elton García

June 4 10	NJ/NY Gotham FC	0–1	San Diego Wave FC	Harrison, New Jersey
2:30 pm		Report	Doniak 46' (Shaw); Colaprico (yellow card) 90+9'	Stadium: Red Bull Arena; Attendance: 15,058; Referee: Eric Tattersall

June 9 11	Racing Louisville FC	0–0	San Diego Wave FC	Louisville, Kentucky
5:00 pm	Milliet (yellow card) 66'	Report	McNabb (yellow card) 43'; Shaw (yellow card) 44'; Pogarch (yellow card) 71'	Stadium: Lynn Family Stadium; Attendance: 6,753; Referee: Adorae Monroy

June 17 12	San Diego Wave FC	1–2	Angel City FC	San Diego, California
1:00 pm	McNabb 57' (Morgan)	Report	Le Bihan (yellow card) 62'; Nielsen 69' (Le Bihan); Vignola 88' (Camberos)	Stadium: Snapdragon Stadium; Attendance: 25,515; Referee: Matthew Thompson

June 24 13	San Diego Wave FC	1–2	OL Reign	San Diego, California
7:00 pm	Shaw 47' (Morgan); Sheridan (red card) 90+1'	Report	Balcer 8' (Quinn), 77' (Huerta); Barnes (yellow card) 81'; King (yellow card) 83'; Quinn (yellow card) 90+12'	Stadium: Snapdragon Stadium; Attendance: 22,682; Referee: Natalie Simon

July 1 14	Chicago Red Stars	1–0	San Diego Wave FC	Bridgeview, Illinois
5:00 pm	Cook (yellow card) 33'; Stevens 45+1' (Milazzo)	Report	Kornieck (yellow card) 45+3'; Pogarch (yellow card) 63'	Stadium: SeatGeek Stadium; Attendance: 5,698; Referee: Thomas Snyder

July 8 15	San Diego Wave FC	2–2	Washington Spirit	San Diego, California
7:00 pm	Shorts 46'; Shaw (yellow card) 70'; Kornieck 90' (Turnbow)	Report	Jaurena (yellow card) 14'; Hatch 23' (pen.); Ricketts (yellow card) 45+3'; McKeown (yellow card) 51'; Shorts 54' (o.g.); Carle (yellow card) 89'	Stadium: Snapdragon Stadium; Attendance: 14,362; Referee: Adam Kilpatrick

August 19 16	San Diego Wave FC	2–1	NJ/NY Gotham FC	San Diego, California
7:00 pm	Doniak 17' (Shaw) (yellow card) 56'; Ali 85' (Barcenas)	Report	Stengel (yellow card) 44' (goal) 90+12' (Onumonu)	Stadium: Snapdragon Stadium; Attendance: 12,045; Referee: Elton Garcia

August 25 17	Orlando Pride	1–2	San Diego Wave FC	Orlando, Florida
4:00 pm	Adriana 44' (Marta); Bright (yellow card) 59'	Report	Dahlkemper 7'; Carusa 75' (Doniak); Hill (yellow card) 81'	Stadium: Exploria Stadium; Attendance: 7,556; Referee: Matt Thompson

September 3 18	San Diego Wave FC	1–0	Houston Dash	San Diego, California
5:00 pm	Shaw 57' (Westphal); Jakobsson (yellow card) 83'	Report	Alozie (red card) 33'; Schmidt (yellow card) 49'	Stadium: Snapdragon Stadium; Attendance: 24,936; Referee: Katja Koroleva

September 16 19	San Diego Wave FC	1–2	Kansas City Current	San Diego, California
7:00 pm	Enge 50'; van Egmond (yellow card) 52'	Report	Debinha 3'; Hamilton 22'; Loera (yellow card) 73'	Stadium: Snapdragon Stadium; Attendance: 15,832; Referee: Matthew Corrigan

September 30 20	Portland Thorns FC	0–2	San Diego Wave FC	Portland, Oregon
7:30 pm		Report	Carusa 20' (Shaw); Morgan 38' (Westphal); Pogarch (yellow card) 77'; van Egmond (yellow card) 87'	Stadium: Providence Park; Attendance: 19,947; Referee: Calin Radosav

October 7 21	North Carolina Courage	0–0	San Diego Wave FC	Cary, North Carolina
4:00 pm	Kurtz (yellow card) 67'	Report	Pogarch (yellow card) 61'; Riehl (yellow card) 79'; Kornieck (yellow card) 89'	Stadium: WakeMed Soccer Park; Attendance: 10,434; Referee: Anya Voigt

October 15 22	San Diego Wave FC	2–0	Racing Louisville FC	San Diego, California
2:00 pm	Shaw 26' (Morgan); Dahlkemper (yellow card) 42'; Morgan 47' (Pogarch) (yellow card) 74'; Barcenas (yellow card) 80'	Report		Stadium: Snapdragon Stadium; Attendance: 30,312; Referee: Jeremy Scheer

==== Regular season standings ====
Pos	Team	Pld	W	D	L	GF	GA	GD	Pts	Qualification
1	San Diego Wave FC (S)	22	11	4	7	31	22	+9	37	NWSL Shield, Playoff semifinals, and CONCACAF W Champions Cup
2	Portland Thorns FC	22	10	5	7	42	32	+10	35	Playoff semifinals and W Champions Cup
3	North Carolina Courage	22	9	6	7	29	22	+7	33	Playoff quarterfinals
4	OL Reign	22	9	5	8	29	24	+5	32	Playoff quarterfinals
5	Angel City FC	22	8	7	7	31	30	+1	31	Playoff quarterfinals
6	NJ/NY Gotham FC (C)	22	8	7	7	25	24	+1	31	Playoff quarterfinals
7	Orlando Pride	22	10	1	11	27	28	−1	31	
8	Washington Spirit	22	7	9	6	26	29	−3	30	
9	Racing Louisville FC	22	6	9	7	25	24	+1	27	
10	Houston Dash	22	6	8	8	16	18	−2	26	
11	Kansas City Current	22	8	2	12	30	36	−6	26	
12	Chicago Red Stars	22	7	3	12	28	50	−22	24	

Source: NWSL
Rules for classification: Tiebreakers
(C) Champions and W Champions Cup; (S) NWSL Shield

==== Results summary ====
Overall								Home						Away					
Pld	W	D	L	GF	GA	GD	Pts	W	D	L	GF	GA	GD	W	D	L	GF	GA	GD
22	11	4	7	31	22	+9	37	5	2	4	18	16	+2	6	2	3	13	6	+7

Last updated: October 15, 2023.
Source: NWSLsoccer.com

==== Results by matchday ====
Matchday	1	2	3	4	5	6	7	8	9	10	11	12	13	14	15	16	17	18	19	20	21	22
Stadium	H	H	A	A	H	A	A	A	H	A	A	H	H	A	H	H	A	H	H	A	A	H
Result	W	W	L	W	L	L	W	W	D	W	D	L	L	L	D	W	W	W	L	W	D	W
Position	2	2	3	3	3	5	5	3	4	2	1	5	6	6	6	6	3	1	2	1	2	1

Updated to match(es) played on October 15, 2023. Source: NWSL
A = Away; H = Home; W = Win; D = Draw; L = Loss

=== Playoffs ===
November 5, 2023 Semifinals	San Diego Wave FC	0–1	OL Reign	San Diego, California
6:30 pm PST		[https://www.nwslsoccer.com/match/43e3a780a4f3495b94a9467d54edde6c/san-diego-wave-fc-vs-seattle-reign Box] Report	Latsko 47'	Stadium: Snapdragon Stadium; Attendance: 32,262; Referee: Natalie Simon

=== NWSL Challenge Cup ===
==== Group stage ====
April 19	San Diego Wave FC	1–0	Portland Thorns FC	San Diego, California
7:00 p.m.	Nally 65' (o.g.)	Report		Stadium: Snapdragon Stadium; Attendance: 9,504; Referee: Brandon Stevis

May 31	San Diego Wave FC	0–3	OL Reign	San Diego, California
7:00 p.m.	Kornieck (yellow card) 19'; Gyau (yellow card) 90+2'; Colaprico (yellow card) 90+4'	Report	Sonnett (yellow card) 16'; Stanton (yellow card) 21'; Holmes (yellow card) 22'; Brown 29' (King); Athens 54'; Huitema 60'; Malonson (yellow card) 67'	Stadium: Snapdragon Stadium; Attendance: 9,763; Referee: Anya Voigt

June 28	Angel City FC	2–1	San Diego Wave FC	Los Angeles, California
7:00 p.m.	Hammond 2'; Le Bihan 18'	Report	Colaprico 63'	Stadium: BMO Stadium; Attendance: 13,648; Referee: Katja Koroleva

July 21	Portland Thorns FC	4–1	San Diego Wave FC	Portland, Oregon
7:30 p.m.	Betfort 9', 58' (Klingenberg); Porter (yellow card) 36'; Weaver 54' (Betfort); Vasconcelos (yellow card) 56'; Reyes 61' (Klingenberg)	Report	Kornieck 81' (Shaw)	Stadium: Providence Park; Attendance: 16,393; Referee: Ricardo Fierro

July 28	OL Reign	1–0	San Diego Wave FC	Seattle, Washington
7:00 p.m.	Balcer 71' (pen.)	Report	Hill (yellow card) 56'; Pogarch (yellow card) 90+5'	Stadium: Lumen Field; Attendance: 7,513; Referee: Alyssa Nichols

August 5	San Diego Wave FC	1–1	Angel City FC	San Diego, California
4:30 p.m. PDT (UTC-7)	Shaw 11'; Doniak (yellow card) 35'	Report	Camberos 16'; Gorden (yellow card) 57'	Stadium: Snapdragon Stadium; Attendance: 14,408; Referee: Elijio Arreguin

==== West Division standings ====
Pos	Team	Pld	W	T	L	GF	GA	GD	Pts	Qualification	RGN	LA	POR	SD
1	OL Reign	6	4	2	0	7	0	+7	14	Advance to knockout stage	—	0–0	0–0	1–0
2	Angel City FC	6	2	2	2	7	8	−1	8		0–2	—	2–1	2–1
3	Portland Thorns FC	6	2	1	3	8	7	+1	7		0–1	3–2	—	4–1
4	San Diego Wave FC	6	1	1	4	4	11	−7	4		0–3	1–1	1–0	—

Source: NWSL

==== Results by matchday ====
Matchday	1	2	3	4	5	6
Stadium	A	H	H	H	A	A
Result	W	L	L	L	L	D
Position	2	3	4	4	4	4

Updated to match(es) played on August 5, 2023. Source: NWSL
A = Away; H = Home; W = Win; D = Draw; L = Loss

== Squad statistics ==
As of match played November 5, 2023

=== Appearances and goals ===
Starting appearances are listed first, followed by substitute appearances after the + symbol where applicable.

No.	Pos	Nat	Player	Total		NWSL		Playoffs		Challenge Cup	
No.	Pos	Nat	Player	Apps	Goals	Apps	Goals	Apps	Goals	Apps	Goals
Goalkeepers
1	GK	(Canada) CAN	Kailen Sheridan	21	0	19	0	1	0	1	0
17	GK	(Hungary) HUN	Lauren Brzykcy	0	0	0	0	0	0	0	0
30	GK	(United States) USA	Shae Yanez	9	0	3+1	0	0	0	5	0
Defenders
2	DF	(United States) USA	Abby Dahlkemper	7	1	5	1	1	0	1	0
4	DF	(United States) USA	Naomi Girma	22	0	19	0	1	0	0+2	0
14	DF	(United States) USA	Kristen McNabb	15	1	13	1	0+1	0	1	0
16	DF	(United States) USA	Madison Pogarch	23	1	7+9	1	1	0	5+1	0
18	DF	(United States) USA	Kaleigh Riehl	25	0	18+1	0	0	0	5+1	0
20	DF	(United States) USA	Christen Westphal	28	0	22	0	1	0	4+1	0
26	DF	(United States) USA	Mia Gyau	3	0	0+1	0	0	0	2	0
Midfielders
5	MF	(Australia) AUS	Emily van Egmond	12	0	1+9	0	1	0	0+1	0
8	MF	(United States) USA	Sierra Enge	14	2	7+3	2	0	0	4	0
12	MF	(United States) USA	Giovanna DeMarco	2	0	0	0	0	0	2	0
22	MF	(United States) USA	Taylor Kornieck	22	2	6+10	1	0+1	0	5	1
23	MF	(United States) USA	Belle Briede	12	1	2+5	1	0	0	4+1	0
24	MF	(United States) USA	Danielle Colaprico	28	1	21+1	0	1	0	3+2	1
28	MF	(United States) USA	Meggie Dougherty Howard	17	0	8+4	0	0	0	1+4	0
Forwards
3	FW	(United States) USA	Rachel Hill	23	0	15+2	0	1	0	5	0
6	FW	(United States) USA	Kelsey Turnbow	11	0	0+7	0	0	0	3+1	0
7	FW	(United States) USA	Amirah Ali	21	2	5+11	2	0+1	0	2+2	0
10	FW	(Sweden) SWE	Sofia Jakobsson	19	2	8+8	2	0+1	0	1+1	0
11	FW	(United States) USA	Jaedyn Shaw	29	6	19+3	5	1	0	4+2	1
13	FW	(United States) USA	Alex Morgan	20	6	18	6	1	0	0+1	0
15	FW	(United States) USA	Makenzy Doniak	27	3	11+10	3	1	0	3+2	0
19	FW	(Republic of Ireland) IRL	Kyra Carusa	8	2	4+3	2	0+1	0	0	0
25	FW	(United States) USA	Melanie Barcenas	12	0	0+7	0	0	0	2+3	0
Players who left the club during the season:
27	FW	(United States) USA	Shea Connors	2	0	0+1	0	0	0	0+1	0
33	GK	(United States) USA	Meagan McClelland	0	0	0	0	0	0	0	0
34	DF	(United States) USA	Cheyenne Shorts	4	1	2	1	0	0	2	0
37	DF	(Guyana) GUY	Sydney Cummings	0	0	0	0	0	0	0	0
46	DF	(United States) USA	Chai Cortez	3	0	1+1	0	0	0	1	0

=== Goalscorers ===
Rank	No.	Pos.	Nat.	Name	NWSL	Playoffs	Cup	Total
1	13	FW	(United States)	Alex Morgan	6	0	0	6
2	11	FW	(United States)	Jaedyn Shaw	5	0	1	6
3	15	FW	(United States)	Makenzy Doniak	3	0	0	3
4	10	FW	(Sweden)	Sofia Jakobsson	2	0	0	2
4	7	FW	(United States)	Amirah Ali	2	0	0	2
4	8	MF	(United States)	Sierra Enge	2	0	0	2
4	19	FW	(Republic of Ireland)	Kyra Carusa	2	0	0	2
5	22	MF	(United States)	Taylor Kornieck	1	0	1	2
6	2	DF	(United States)	Abby Dahlkemper	1	0	0	1
6	23	MF	(United States)	Belle Briede	1	0	0	1
6	14	DF	(United States)	Kristen McNabb	1	0	0	1
6	16	DF	(United States)	Madison Pogarch	1	0	0	1
6	34	DF	(United States)	Cheyenne Shorts	1	0	0	1
7	24	MF	(United States)	Danielle Colaprico	0	0	1	1
Own goals					1	0	1	2
Total					29	0	4	33

=== Shutouts ===
Rank	No.	Pos.	Name	NWSL	Playoffs	Cup	Total
1	1	GK	(Canada) Kailen Sheridan	9	0	1	10
Total				9	0	1	10

== Transactions ==
=== 2023 NWSL Draft ===
Draft picks are not automatically signed to the team roster. The 2023 NWSL Draft was held on January 12, 2023.

Round	Pick	Player	Pos.	College	Status
2	13	(United States) Sierra Enge	MF	Stanford	Signed
3	33	(United States) Lauren Brzykcy	GK	UCLA	Signed
4	45	(United States) Giovanna DeMarco	MF	Wake Forest	Signed

=== Transfers in ===
Date	Player	Pos.	Previous club	Fee/notes	Ref.
December 2, 2022	(United States) Rachel Hill	FW	(United States) Chicago Red Stars	Free agent signing.	
December 5, 2022	(United States) Danielle Colaprico	MF	(United States) Chicago Red Stars	Free agent signing.	
January 12, 2023	(United States) Megan Dougherty Howard	MF	(United States) Orlando Pride	Free agent signing.	
March 28, 2023	(United States) Cheyenne Shorts	DF	(United States) Portland Thorns FC	Short-term injury replacement player signing.	
April 26, 2023	(United States) Shae Yanez	GK	(England) London City Lionesses	Transferred for an undisclosed fee.	
June 27, 2023	(United States) Chai Cortez	DF	(United States) Oregon Ducks	Short-term national team replacement player signings.	
June 27, 2023	(United States) Shea Connors	FW	(Australia) Brisbane Roar FC	Short-term national team replacement player signings.	
June 27, 2023	(United States) Sydney Cummings	DF	(Australia) Western United FC	Short-term national team replacement player signings.	
July 7, 2023	(United States) Meagan McClelland	GK	(United States) Chicago Red Stars	Short-term national team replacement player signings.	
August 16, 2023	(Republic of Ireland) Kyra Carusa	FW	(England) London City Lionesses	Free transfer.	

=== Transfers out ===
Date	Player	Pos.	Destination club	Fee/notes	Ref.
November 15, 2022	(United States) Jackie Altschuld	FW	(Finland) FC Honka	Out of contract.	
November 15, 2022	(United States) Taylor Hansen	DF	Unattached	Out of contract.	
November 15, 2022	(United States) Katie Johnson	FW	(United States) Angel City FC	Out of contract.	
November 15, 2022	(United States) Melissa Lowder	GK	(Iceland) Þór/KA	Out of contract.	
November 15, 2022	(United States) Sydney Pulver	MF	Unattached	Out of contract.	
November 15, 2022	(United States) Kayla Bruster	DF	(Iceland) Fylkir	The club chose not to exercise contract options.	
November 15, 2022	(Germany) Marleen Schimmer	FW	(Germany) 1. FC Köln	The club chose not to exercise contract options.	
August 31, 2023	(United States) Chai Cortez	DF	(United States) San DIego Wave FC	National team replacement players released.	
August 31, 2023	(United States) Shea Connors	FW	(United States) Sydney FC	National team replacement players released.	
August 31, 2023	(United States) Sydney Cummings	DF	(Scotland) Celtic	National team replacement players released.	
August 31, 2023	(United States) Meagan McClelland	GK	(United States) NJ/NY Gotham FC	National team replacement players released.	

=== Retirements ===
Date	Player	Pos.	Ref.
March 15, 2023	(England) Carly Telford	GK	

=== Preseason trialists ===
Trialists are non-rostered invitees during preseason and are not automatically signed. The Wave released their preseason roster on February 6, 2023.

Player	Pos.	Previous team
(United States) Melanie Barcenas	FW	(United States) San Diego Surf SC
(United States) Trinity Watson	DF	(United States) Pepperdine Waves
(United States) Maisie Whitsett	MF	(United States) Louisville Cardinals

Signed to first team contract.

== See also ==
- 2023 National Women's Soccer League season
- 2023 in American soccer
