= 2024 NWSL Challenge Cup =

- Red Bull Arena in Harrison, New Jersey, hosted the match.
- Event: NWSL Challenge Cup
NJ/NY Gotham FC	San Diego Wave FC
0	1
- Date: March 15, 2024
- Venue: Red Bull Arena, Harrison, New Jersey
- Most Valuable Player: Alex Morgan
- Referee: Danielle Chesky
- Attendance: 14,241

The 2024 NWSL Challenge Cup, known as the 2024 UKG NWSL Challenge Cup for sponsorship reasons, was the fifth edition of the NWSL Challenge Cup, a women's soccer competition organized by the National Women's Soccer League (NWSL). The match was the first Challenge Cup to be played in the super cup format as a one-off game, contested by the winners of the previous season's NWSL Championship and NWSL Shield. It featured NJ/NY Gotham FC, champions of the 2023 National Women's Soccer League, and San Diego Wave FC, winners of the 2023 NWSL Shield. The match was played on March 15, 2024, and was hosted by Gotham FC at Red Bull Arena in Harrison, New Jersey. The match was acted as a curtain raiser to the 2024 season, and was broadcast on Amazon Prime Video, marking the start of the platform's coverage of the NWSL.

The San Diego Wave defeated Gotham 1–0, with an Alex Morgan goal in the 88th minute.

== Background ==
The NWSL Challenge Cup was created as a league cup tournament in 2020 as a return to competition after the 2020 NWSL regular season was canceled due to the COVID-19 pandemic. The competition was successful enough to be brought back in 2021, though played prior to the start of the NWSL's regular season. This format continued in 2022, but was changed in 2023 to take place during the league's regular season. However, with more regular season matches taking place due to the league being expanded from 12 to 14 teams in 2024, the NWSL decided to scrap the league cup format. Instead, the competition was reformatted to be a one-off super cup match, to be contested by the winners of the NWSL Championship and NWSL Shield from the previous season. Should the same team win the NWSL Shield and Championship, the fixture will be a rematch of the previous NWSL Championship. The game will act as an opener to the league season, played the day prior to the first regular season matches.

The competition will continue to be sponsored by UKG. The company will award $3,500 in prize money to each player of the winning team, while each player of the losing team will receive $2,200. The most valuable player will be awarded an additional $2,000.

== Teams ==
Team	Qualification	Previous final appearances (bold indicates winners)
NJ/NY Gotham FC	2023 NWSL champions	1 (2021)
San Diego Wave FC	2023 NWSL Shield winners	None

== Match ==
=== Details ===
March 15, 2024
8:00 pm EDT

NJ/NY Gotham FC	0–1	San Diego Wave FC
	Report	Morgan 88'

Red Bull Arena, Harrison, New Jersey
Attendance: 14,241
Referee: Danielle Chesky

**Gotham**	**Wave**

GK	38	(United States) Cassie Miller
RB	5	(United States) Kelley O'Hara (c)		(substituted off) 85'
CB	15	(United States) Tierna Davidson
CB	77	(Spain) Maitane López		(substituted off) 85'
LB	3	(Brazil) Bruninha	(yellow card) 85'
DM	14	(United States) Nealy Martin		(substituted off) 75'
RM	18	(Republic of Ireland) Yazmeen Ryan		(substituted off) 66'
LM	17	(United States) Delanie Sheehan	(yellow card) 69'
LW	9	(Spain) Esther González	(yellow card) 72'
RW	23	(United States) Midge Purce		(substituted off) 76'
ST	28	(United States) Katie Stengel		(substituted off) 66'
Substitutes:
GK	1	(United States) Michelle Betos
DF	25	(United States) Maycee Bell		(substituted in) 85'
DF	19	(United States) Crystal Dunn		(substituted in) 66'
DF	22	(United States) Mandy Freeman
DF	21	(United States) Sam Hiatt		(substituted in) 85'
MF	2	(United States) Jenna Nighswonger		(substituted in) 76'
MF	6	(United States) Emily Sonnett		(substituted in) 66'
FW	13	(United States) Ella Stevens		(substituted in) 85'
FW	8	(United States) Taryn Torres
Manager:
(United States) Juan Carlos Amorós

GK	1	(Canada) Kailen Sheridan
RB	6	(Sweden) Hanna Lundkvist	(substituted off) 74'
CB	4	(United States) Naomi Girma
CB	2	(United States) Abby Dahlkemper (c)
LB	20	(United States) Christen Westphal	(substituted off) 61'
DM	5	(Australia) Emily van Egmond
DM	15	(United States) Makenzy Doniak	(substituted off) 71'
AM	21	(United States) Savannah McCaskill
RM	23	(United States) Elyse Bennett	(substituted off) 60'
LM	11	(United States) Jaedyn Shaw	(substituted off) 90+1'
ST	33	(Republic of Ireland) Kyra Carusa	(substituted off) 45'
Substitutes:
GK	22	(United States) Hillary Beall
GK	35	(United States) Morgan Messner
DF	8	(United States) Sierra Enge	(substituted in) 74'
DF	16	(Australia) Kaitlyn Torpey	(substituted in) 61'
MF	24	(United States) Danielle Colaprico	(substituted in) 71'
MF	10	(Sweden) Sofia Jakobsson	(substituted in) 60'
FW	13	(United States) Alex Morgan	(substituted in) 45'
FW	25	(United States) Melanie Barcenas
FW	7	(United States) Amirah Ali	(substituted in) 90+1'
Manager:
(England) Casey Stoney

Most Valuable Player:
Alex Morgan (San Diego Wave)
Assistant referees:
Tom Felice
Art Arustamyan
Fourth official:
Alyssa Nichols
Video assistant referee:
Kevin Broadley
Assistant video assistant referee:
Kaili Terry

**Match rules**

- 90 minutes.
- Penalty shoot-out if scores level.
- Nine named substitutes, of which up to five may be used.
