= Katie Meyer =

American soccer player (2000–2022)

- Meyer during her tenure at Stanford

Personal information
- Full name: Kathryn Diane Meyer
- Date of birth: January 20, 2000
- Place of birth: Burbank, California, U.S.
- Date of death: March 1, 2022 (aged 22)
- Place of death: Stanford, California, U.S.
- Height: 5 ft 9 in (1.75 m)
- Position: Goalkeeper

Youth career
- 2014–2017: Newbury Park Panthers
- 2014–2016: Eagles Soccer Club
- 2016–2018: Real So Cal

College career
Years	Team	Apps	(Gls)
2018–2022	Stanford Cardinal	50	(0)

International career
2015	United States U16		
2016	United States U17		

Kathryn Diane Meyer (January 20, 2000 – March 1, 2022) was an American college soccer player who played as a goalkeeper for the Stanford Cardinal. She led Stanford to an NCAA championship in 2019, making two saves in the title game penalty shootout and captained the team for the next two years. She trained with the United States youth national team from the under-16 to under-18 levels.

== Early life ==
Meyer was born in Burbank, California, the middle of three children born to Steven and Gina Meyer, and grew up in Newbury Park. In 2015, she was featured on the Nickelodeon reality show Soccer Superstar.

Katie has two sisters, one of whom, Siena, has played for UCLA Bruins since 2025 and also played for Newbury Park Panthers like her sister.

Meyer attended Newbury Park High School for her first three years of high school before transferring to Century Academy in Thousand Oaks, California for her senior year. During her time at Newbury Park High School, she was also the kicker for the varsity football team for two seasons. She played club soccer for Real So Cal and Eagles Soccer Club as well as the United States youth national team. She committed to play college soccer for the Stanford Cardinal on October 10, 2015.

After her death in 2022, her family created Katie's Save to promote systemic challenges at college and universities to promote mental health, protect students and prevent suicide.

== College career ==
She did not lose a game in her debut 2019 season, keeping clean sheets in 10 of 16 appearances. She played a critical role at the NCAA tournament. In the semifinals, she saved a penalty kick by Mia Fishel in a 4–1 win over UCLA. Stanford faced North Carolina in the championship game, which went into a penalty shootout after a scoreless regulation and extra time. Meyer saved Taylor Otto's opening penalty kick and the sixth-round kick by Tori Hansen to set up the Cardinal victory. Meyer was recognized as the most valuable player of the match, and video of her goalkeeping went viral online.

She became team captain of the Cardinal in the 2020 season, which was abbreviated due to the COVID-19 pandemic, and made a career-high 49 saves in 14 games. She started all but one game as captain in her redshirt junior year in 2021.

Meyer was pursuing a degree in international relations with a minor in history. She was part of the 2022 cohort for the selective Mayfield Fellows Program, which develops Stanford students to lead technology ventures, and reportedly hoped to attend Stanford Law School after graduating. On February 13, 2022, she recorded the first episode of a podcast, Be the Mentality.

== International career ==
Meyer trained with the United States national under-16 and under-17 teams in 2015 and 2016. She represented the under-16s at the Tournament of Gradisca in Italy and was named as an alternate to the under-17 team for the 2016 FIFA U-17 Women's World Cup. She trained with the under-18 team in 2017.

== Death and legacy ==
Meyer died by suicide on March 1, 2022 in her dorm room in Crothers Hall. She suffered from anxiety and depression and had been facing disciplinary action for allegedly spilling coffee on a Stanford football player who was accused of sexually assaulting another member of the women's soccer team. On the night of her death, while on the phone with a teammate, Meyer received an email advising her of final disciplinary actions in the case, including the possibility of having her diploma withheld. She had no legal representation in the case.

The Meyer family filed a wrongful death suit against Stanford on November 23, 2022 in Santa Clara County Superior Court. The lawsuit was scheduled for trial in April 2026 and settled on January 26th, 2026.

In 2024, California Governor Gavin Newsom signed Assembly Bill 1575, or Katie Meyer's Law, introduced by Assembly member Jacqui Irwin. The law mandates that public schools allow college students facing a disciplinary issue to have an outside adviser in order for the schools to receive state aid for student financial assistance. Because Stanford is a private school, it does not need to adhere to the new law. A non-profit started by Meyer's parents hopes to have a version of the law in all 50 states.

In fall 2022, the Stanford women's soccer team wore warm-up jerseys with "Mental Health Matters" on the front and a suicide hotline number on the sleeve. A documentary about Meyer's death, Save: The Katie Meyer Story, aired on ESPN's E:60 in May 2025.

== College career statistics ==
School	Season	Regular season			College Cup		Total	
School	Season	Division	Apps	Goals	Apps	Goals	Apps	Goals
Stanford Cardinal	2019	Div. I	11	0	5	0	16	0
Stanford Cardinal	2020–21	Div. I	14	0	—		14	0
Stanford Cardinal	2021	Div. I	19	0	1	0	20	0
NCAA total			44	0	6	0	50	0

== Honors ==
Stanford Cardinal

- Pac-12 champion: 2019
- NCAA Division I Women's Soccer Championship: 2019

Individual

- College Cup All-Tournament Team: 2019
- United Soccer Coaches All-West-Region: 2019 (third team)
- Pac-12 Academic Honor Roll: 2019, 2020–21
- CoSIDA Academic All-District-8: 2021
