= Christen Westphal =

American soccer player (born 1993)

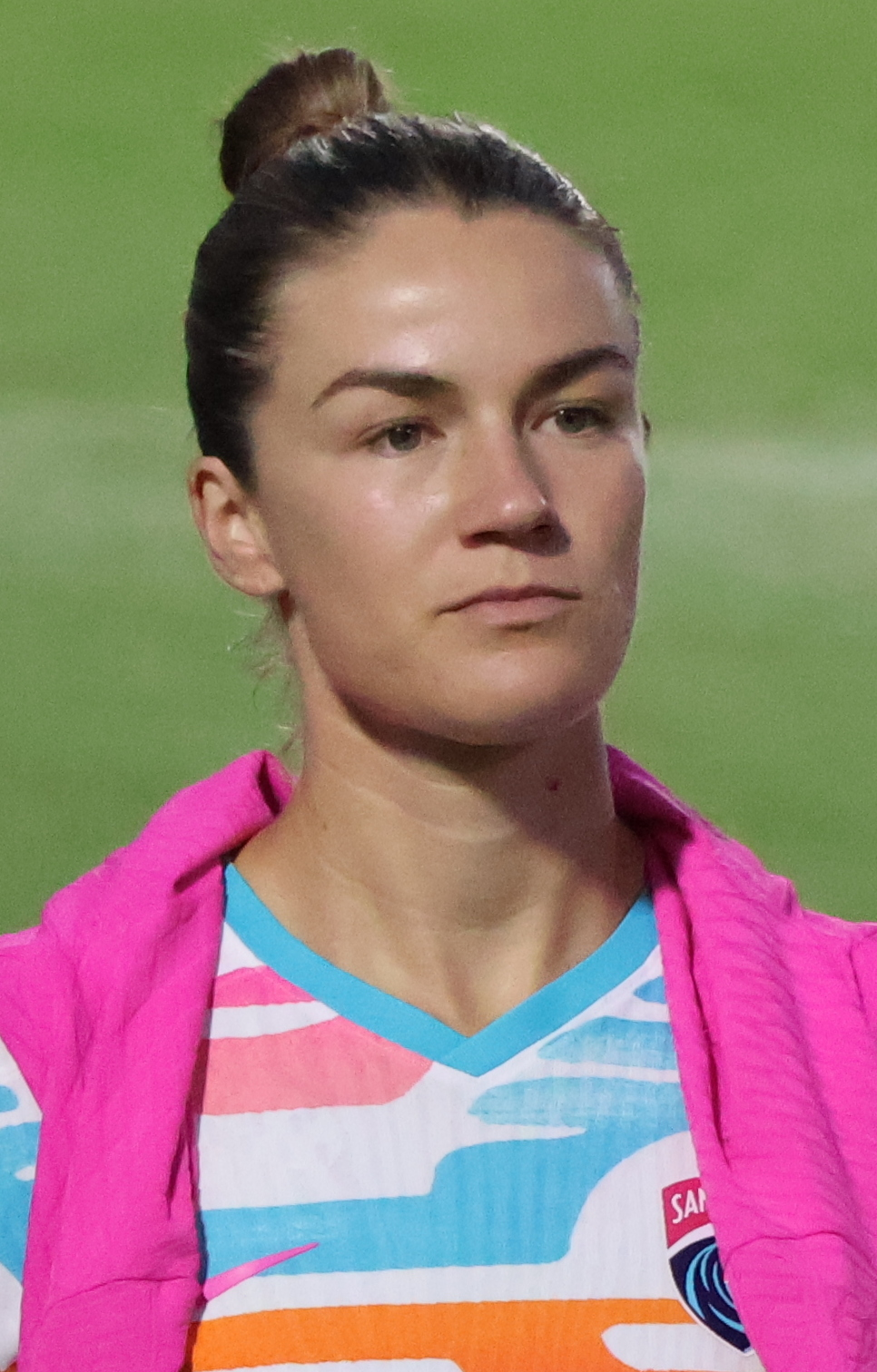
- Westphal with the San Diego Wave in 2024

Personal information
- Full name: Christen Joan Westphal
- Date of birth: September 2, 1993 (age 33)
- Place of birth: Brecksville, Ohio, United States
- Height: 5 ft 6 in (1.68 m)
- Position: Right back

Youth career
- Internationals Soccer Club

College career
Years	Team	Apps	(Gls)
2012–2015	Florida Gators	96	(4)

Senior career*
Years	Team	Apps	(Gls)
2016–2017	Boston Breakers	26	(1)
2018–2019	Reign FC	16	(0)
2020–2021	Portland Thorns	15	(0)
2022–2024	San Diego Wave	59	(0)
2025–2026	Houston Dash	9	(0)

International career
2014–2016	United States U23		
- * Club domestic league appearances and goals as of 13:51, April 25, 2026 (UTC)

Christen Joan Westphal (born September 2, 1993) is an American professional soccer player who plays as a right back. She has previously played for the Boston Breakers, Seattle Reign FC, Portland Thorns FC, San Diego Wave FC, and the Houston Dash of the National Women's Soccer League (NWSL). She played college soccer for the Florida Gators.

== Collegiate career ==
Westphal attended the University of Florida where she played as a center back for the Florida Gators women's soccer team from 2012–15. Her senior year, TopDrawerSoccer named her one of the top 10 women's soccer defenders in the NCAA's Division 1. The same year she was named Southeastern Conference Soccer Defender of the Year. Westphal was named to the All-SEC team every year of her collegiate career, and was named to the SEC first team three consecutive years. Her senior year, she led the Gators (and tied for first in the SEC) in assists with 10 and was named as a Hermann Trophy semifinalist.

== Club career ==
Westphal was drafted by Boston Breakers in the first round of the 2016 NWSL College Draft. She signed with Boston in March 2016 and made her debut on April 16, 2016, against Washington Spirit. During her rookie season, she was a starting defender in 7 of the 13 games in which she played and scored one goal. The goal against the Western New York Flash was nominated for Goal of the Week. During the 2017 season, Westphal started in all 13 games that she played and recorded an assist. A right foot injury endured in a match against Seattle on July 15 ended her season prematurely. The Breakers finished the 2017 season in ninth place with a 4–13–7 record.

Westphal was selected by the Reign FC in the 2018 NWSL dispersal draft after Boston folded unexpectedly ahead of the 2018 season.

Westphal was out of contract after the 2019 season, and her NWSL rights were traded to Portland Thorns.

Immediately after the 2022 NWSL Expansion Draft, it was announced that San Diego Wave acquired the rights to Westphal and Amirah Ali from Portland via trade. San Diego had passed on several picks, instead negotiating the trade.

On December 10, 2024, the San Diego Wave traded Westphal to the Houston Dash in exchange for a 2025 international roster spot and $14,000 in allocation money plus performance-based incentives. In her first year with the Dash, Westphal made 9 regular season appearances (7 starts). A month into the 2026 season, she departed from Houston on a mutual contract termination.

== International career ==
Westphal has represented the United States on the under-23 national team. She competed at the 2015 Four Nations Tournament in Norway and helped the U.S. win the tournament.

== Personal life ==
Westphal married fellow National Women's Soccer League player Madison Pogarch on December 10, 2025.

== Career statistics ==
=== Club ===
As of November 2, 2025

Appearances and goals by club, season and competition
Club	Season	League			Cup (Note: Includes the NWSL Challenge Cup)		Playoffs (Note: Includes NWSL Playoffs)		Continental (Note: Includes CONCACAF W Champions Cup)		Other		Total	
Club	Season	Division	Apps	Goals	Apps	Goals	Apps	Goals	Apps	Goals	Apps	Goals	Apps	Goals
Boston Breakers	2016	NWSL	13	1	—		—		—		—		13	1
Boston Breakers	2017	NWSL	13	0	—		—		—		—		13	0
Boston Breakers	Total		26	1	—		—		—		—		26	1
Reign FC	2018	NWSL	12	0	—		0	0	—		—		12	0
Reign FC	2019	NWSL	4	0	—		0	0	—		—		4	0
Reign FC	Total		16	0	—		0	0	—		—		16	0
Portland Thorns FC	2020	NWSL	— (Note: The 2020 NWSL regular season and playoffs were canceled due to the COVID-19 pandemic.)		6	0	—		—		4 (Note: Includes NWSL Fall Series)	0	10	0
Portland Thorns FC	2021	NWSL	15	0	4	0	0	0	—		—		19	0
Portland Thorns FC	Total		15	0	10	0	0	0	—		4	0	29	0
San Diego Wave FC	2022	NWSL	22	0	6	0	2	0	—		—		30	0
San Diego Wave FC	2023	NWSL	22	0	5	0	1	0	—		—		28	0
San Diego Wave FC	2024	NWSL	15	0	1	0	—		3	0	3 (Note: Includes NWSL x Liga MX Femenil Summer Cup)	0	22	0
San Diego Wave FC	Total		59	0	12	0	3	0	3	0	3	0	80	0
Houston Dash	2025	NWSL	9	0	—		—		—		—		9	0
Career total			125	1	22	0	3	0	3	0	7	0	160	1

== Honors ==
Portland Thorns

- NWSL Community Shield : 2020
- NWSL Challenge Cup: 2021
- International Champions Cup: 2021
- NWSL Shield: 2021

San Diego Wave

- NWSL Shield: 2023
- NWSL Challenge Cup: 2024
