= Kyra Carusa =

Irish-American footballer (born 1995)

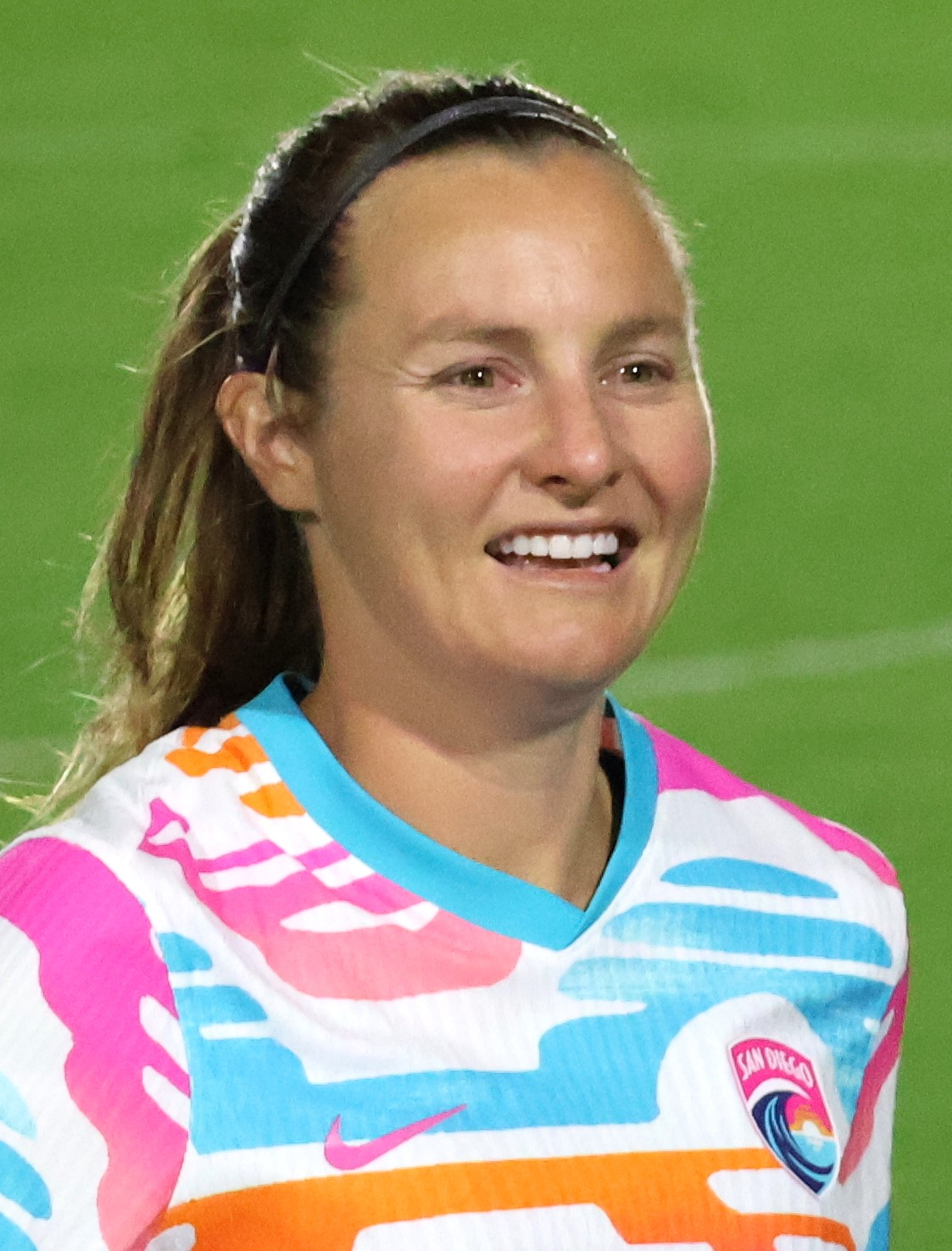
- Carusa with the San Diego Wave in 2025

Personal information
- Full name: Kyra Taylor Carusa
- Date of birth: 14 November 1995 (age 30)
- Place of birth: San Diego, California, U.S.
- Height: 1.75 m (5 ft 9 in)
- Position: Striker

Team information
- Current team: HB Køge
- Number: 7

Youth career
- San Diego Surf

College career
Years	Team	Apps	(Gls)
2014–2017	Stanford Cardinal	69	(25)
2018	Georgetown Hoyas	25	(10)

Senior career*
Years	Team	Apps	(Gls)
2019	Le Havre AC	3	(4)
2020–2023	HB Køge	60	(34)
2023	London City Lionesses	11	(1)
2023–2025	San Diego Wave	38	(4)
2026–	HB Køge	2	(3)
2026	→ Kansas City Current (loan)	4	(0)

International career^{‡}
2018	United States U23		
2020–	Republic of Ireland	47	(15)
- * Club domestic league appearances and goals as of 16:12, 5 August 2026 (UTC) ‡ National team caps and goals as of 18 October 2026

Kyra Taylor Carusa (/kɪərə/; born 14 November 1995) is a professional soccer player who plays as a forward for Danish A-Liga club HB Køge. Born in the United States, she plays for the Republic of Ireland national team.

Carusa played college soccer for the Stanford Cardinal and the Georgetown Hoyas, winning the 2017 national championship with Stanford. She was subsequently drafted in the third round of the 2019 NWSL College Draft by Sky Blue FC. However, Carusa chose to start her professional career in Europe, where she played for Le Havre AC, HB Køge, and the London City Lionesses. She has also played in the NWSL for San Diego Wave FC.

== Early life ==
Carusa was born and raised in the North County area of San Diego, California, alongside her mother Nicole, father Richard, and siblings Scott, Kelley, and Jordan. She attended Oak Valley Middle School before moving to Del Norte High School, where she scored 58 goals and notched 50 assists over 3 seasons of varsity soccer. As a youth player, Carusa competed for the San Diego Surf, where she was a four-year team captain.

== College career ==
=== Stanford Cardinal ===
Carusa began her college soccer career on the Stanford Cardinal women's soccer team. Shortly before her freshman season, Carusa tore her ACL and was forced to redshirt for the year. She recovered in time for the 2015 season, where she played as a Redshirt freshman. She appeared in every match that the Cardinals played, starting in all but one. She scored several game-winning goals for her team and was named to the Pac-12 All-Freshman Team and the All-Pac-12 second team. Carusa ended her first collegiate soccer season with 23 matches under her belt, 5 goals, and 6 assists.

The following year, Carusa was one of five Stanford players to be named in the starting lineup for all 21 games of the season. She ended the year with 5 goals and 10 assists, resulting in her being recognized on the NSCAA All-Pacific Region third team and the All-Pac-12 second team.

In her redshirt junior season, Carusa once again started every single match for the Cardinal. She scored a career-high 15 goals, including one in the Cardinals' NCAA quarterfinal against Penn State (she also recorded an assist in the match). Further on in the tournament, she netted Stanford's opening goal in the national championship match, which they went on to win, 3–2. At the end of the season, she was named to the All-Pac-12 second team for the third consecutive year. Carusa departed from Stanford having made 69 appearances (starting in all but one) and scored 15 goals.

=== Georgetown Hoyas ===
After her experience at Stanford, Carusa transferred to Georgetown University for graduate school. With an extra year of college eligibility due to her 2014 injury redshirt, Carusa played for the Hoyas in the 2018 season. She appeared 25 times and scored 10 goals in her lone season with Georgetown.

== Club career ==
=== Le Havre ===
During the 2019 NWSL College Draft, Carusa was selected by Sky Blue FC as the 19th overall pick of the draft. She was later waived by Sky Blue and was then picked up on the NWSL waiver wire by Utah Royals FC. Ultimately, Carusa did not sign with the Royals and elected to go overseas. In April 2019, Carusa joined French club Le Havre AC in the French second division. She played three matches, scoring four goals for the club.

=== HB Køge ===
Carusa signed a new contract with the Danish club HB Køge in the Kvinde 1. division in February 2020. She scored 4 goals on her debut against AaB on 9 August 2020 and quickly helped the team gain promotion to the Elitedivisionen. Carusa scored a further hattrick against FC Nordsjælland on 24 April 2021.

=== London City Lionesses ===
In February 2023, Carusa joined English club London City Lionesses. She made her league debut against Sunderland on 5 February 2023. She scored her first league goal against Lewes on 12 February 2023, scoring in the 38th minute. She left London City Lionesses with 1 goal in 11 total appearances.

=== San Diego Wave ===
In August 2023, Carusa joined her hometown club San Diego Wave FC on a free transfer. She made her league debut against NJ/NY Gotham FC on 20 August 2023, entering the match as a substitute for Alex Morgan. She scored her first NWSL goal against the Orlando Pride six days later, the game-winner in a 2–1 victory. She ended her first season with the San Diego Wave with 2 goals scored and 8 regular season appearances. Additionally, she played in the Wave's semi-final match against the OL Reign, coming off the bench in the 88th minute for Danielle Colaprico. In her time on the field, Carusa forced a save from Reign goalkeeper Claudia Dickey, but the Wave ultimately fell, 1–0, to their opponents.

On 10 January 2024, the Wave re-signed Carusa through the 2024 season, with a mutual option for 2025 as well. On 15 March, she played 45 minutes in the Wave's 1–0 NWSL Challenge Cup victory, taking home the trophy with her team. She scored two goals at the start of the NWSL regular season before picking up a thigh injury in late June. She missed several months of active play before making her return to the field on 14 September 2024.

Ahead of 2025, Carusa exercised her player contract option with the Wave, keeping her in San Diego for another year. She played most of her third season for San Diego as a substitute, starting in only 3 of her 14 appearances. She recorded one goal contribution on the year, assisting Delphine Cascarino in a late goal against the Washington Spirit that initially appeared to have salvaged a draw for San Diego before Rosemonde Kouassi put the Spirit back on top. She was one of three unused substitutes in the Wave's extra-time quarterfinal defeat to the Portland Thorns on 9 November 2025. At the end of the season, she departed from San Diego after having made 38 league appearances across two-and-a-half seasons.

=== Return to HB Køge ===
Carusa joined the Kansas City Current as a non-roster training player in the 2026 preseason. Later in January 2026, her former club HB Køge – now a sister club of the Current – announced that she would return there after the summer. The two clubs subsequently announced that Carusa would be spending that six-month period before the summer on loan with the Current. She made 4 appearances for Kansas City before Køge recalled her early on 2 June 2026.

== International career ==
Eligible to play for the Republic of Ireland through her Irish grandparents, Carusa began the process of applying for Irish citizenship as a graduate student at Georgetown. In February 2020, She was cleared by FIFA to play for the Republic of Ireland women's national football team. She received her first call-up shortly after, for two UEFA Women's Euro 2021 qualifying games against Greece and Montenegro. Carusa made her debut for Ireland on March 11, 2020, entering the match versus Montenegro as a second-half substitute for Clare Shine. She scored her first international goal on November 30, 2023, in a FIFA Women's World Cup qualification match against Georgia. In the 21st minute, Carusa flicked on a headed ball from teammate Louise Quinn into the goal, making the score 2–0. Ireland eventually went on to score 9 more goals in an 11–0 victory over their competitors.

On June 27, 2023, Ireland head coach Vera Pauw included Carusa in the team's 2023 FIFA Women's World Cup squad. She started all three matches, including a full 90 minutes in Ireland's final group stage game versus Nigeria. In Ireland's match against Canada, it was Carusa who created the corner kick opportunity in the 4th minute that teammate Katie McCabe scored from. Ultimately, Ireland ended up in last place in Group B and did not advance to the knockout stages of the tournament. Carusa scored her third international goal in front of a record-setting 35,944 fans at Aviva Stadium in Dublin. She scored her fourth a mere three days later, helping the team record a 4–0 victory over Hungary. Carusa notched her first international brace on October 27, 2023, scoring two goals in quick succession in a 5–1 win over Albania.

After missing time in 2024 due to her thigh injury, Carusa made her return to international play in October. She scored in her first game back, climbing to eighth place in Ireland's all-time goalscoring leaderboard. In June 2025, she won the 35th FAI Senior Women's International Player of the Year award.

== Career statistics ==
=== Club ===
As of 23 November 2025

Appearances and goals by club, season and competition
Club	Season	League			Cup (Note: Includes the NWSL Challenge Cup and Kvinde 1. division Relegation Playoffs)		Playoffs (Note: Includes NWSL Playoffs)		Continental (Note: Includes UEFA Women's Champions League and CONCACAF W Champions Cup)		Total	
Club	Season	Division	Apps	Goals	Apps	Goals	Apps	Goals	Apps	Goals	Apps	Goals
Le Havre AC	2019–20	Division 2 Féminine	3	4	—		—		—		3	4
HB Køge	2019–20	Kvinde 1. division	0	0	5	4	—		—		5	4
HB Køge	2020–21	Elitedivisionen	24	18	—		—		—		24	18
HB Køge	2021–22	Elitedivisionen	22	8	—		—		8	1	30	9
HB Køge	2022–23	Elitedivisionen	11	4	—		—		2	0	13	4
HB Køge	Total		57	30	5	4	—		10	1	72	35
London City Lionesses	2022–23	Championship	11	1	0	0	—		—		11	1
San Diego Wave FC	2023	NWSL	7	2	0	0	1	0	—		8	2
San Diego Wave FC	2024	NWSL	17	2	1	0	—		1	0	19	2
San Diego Wave FC	2025	NWSL	14	0	—		0	0	—		14	0
San Diego Wave FC	Total		38	4	1	0	1	0	1	0	41	4
HB Køge	2025–26	A-Liga	—									
Kansas City Current (Loan)	2026	NWSL	4	0	0	0	0	0	—		4	0
Career total			114	39	6	4	1	0	11	1	131	44

=== International ===
As of match played 13 October 2026

Appearances and goals by national team and year
National team	Year	Apps	Goals
Republic of Ireland	2020	1	0
Republic of Ireland	2021	3	1
Republic of Ireland	2022	4	1
Republic of Ireland	2023	13	5
Republic of Ireland	2024	10	2
Republic of Ireland	2025	10	3
Republic of Ireland	2026	6	3
Total		47	15

Scores and results list Republic of Ireland's goals first. Score column indicates score after each Carusa goal. Updated as of 9 October 2026.

International goals scored by Kyra Carusa
No.	Cap	Date	Venue	Opponent	Score	Result	Competition
1	4	30 November 2021	Tallaght Stadium, Dublin, Ireland	Georgia	2–0	11–0	2023 FIFA Women's World Cup qualification
2	8	14 November 2022	Pinatar Arena, San Pedro Alcántara, Spain	Morocco	4–0	4–0	Friendly
3	16	23 September 2023	Aviva Stadium, Dublin, Ireland	Northern Ireland	2–0	3–0	2023–24 UEFA Women's Nations League
4	17	26 September 2023	Hidegkuti Nándor Stadion, Budapest, Hungary	Hungary	3–0	4–0	2023–24 UEFA Women's Nations League
5	18	27 October 2023	Tallaght Stadium, Dublin, Ireland	Albania	3–1	5–1	2023–24 UEFA Women's Nations League
6	18	27 October 2023	Tallaght Stadium, Dublin, Ireland	Albania	4–1	5–1	2023–24 UEFA Women's Nations League
7	21	5 December 2023	Windsor Park, Belfast, Northern Ireland	Northern Ireland	3–0	6–1	2023–24 UEFA Women's Nations League
8	28	25 October 2024	Mikheil Meskhi Stadium, Tbilisi, Georgia	Georgia	2–0	6–0	UEFA Women's Euro 2025 qualifying play-offs
9	29	29 October 2024	Tallaght Stadium, Dublin, Ireland	Georgia	2–0	3–0	UEFA Women's Euro 2025 qualifying play-offs
10	32	21 February 2025	Tallaght Stadium, Dublin, Ireland	Turkey	1–0	1–0	2025 UEFA Women's Nations League
11	34	4 April 2025	Theodoros Vardinogiannis Stadium, Crete, Greece	Greece	2–0	4–0	2025 UEFA Women's Nations League
12	41	29 November 2026	Pinatar Arena, San Pedro Alcántara, Spain	Hungary	2–0	3–2	Friendly
13	45	5 June 2026	Páirc Uí Chaoimh, Cork, Ireland	Netherlands	1–0	3–2	2027 FIFA Women's World Cup qualification
14	47	9 October 2026	Astana Arena, Astana, Kazakhstan	Kazakhstan	1–0	8–0	2027 FIFA Women's World Cup qualification play-offs
15	47	9 October 2026	Astana Arena, Astana, Kazakhstan	Kazakhstan	3–0	8–0	2027 FIFA Women's World Cup qualification play-offs

== Honors ==
Stanford Cardinal

- NCAA Division I Women's Soccer Championship: 2017

San Diego Wave

- NWSL Shield: 2023
- NWSL Challenge Cup: 2024
