= Sierra Enge =

American soccer player

Personal information
- Full name: Sierra Ann Enge
- Date of birth: February 23, 2000 (age 26)
- Place of birth: Sun Valley, Idaho, U.S.
- Height: 5 ft 5 in (1.65 m)
- Position: Midfielder

Youth career
- Carlsbad United

College career
Years	Team	Apps	(Gls)
2018–2022	Stanford Cardinal	79	(5)

Senior career*
Years	Team	Apps	(Gls)
2023–2024	San Diego Wave	11	(2)
2024–2026	Strasbourg	41	(0)
2026–	Crystal Palace	0	(0)

International career
2020	United States U20		
- * Club domestic league appearances and goals as of 16:31, June 18, 2026 (UTC)

Sierra Ann Enge (born February 23, 2000) is an American professional soccer player who plays as a midfielder for Women's Super League club Crystal Palace. She played college soccer for the Stanford Cardinal before being selected in the second round of the 2023 NWSL Draft by San Diego Wave FC. She has previously played for Première Ligue club Strasbourg.

== Early life ==
Enge was raised in Cardiff, California, a beach community outside of San Diego. In an interview with the San Diego PBS station, she said that her parents "wanted me to be active and have fun, and so I played softball, basketball, lacrosse volleyball. I did horseback riding for a little bit — kind of threw myself into everything.” She played soccer for the US Women's Youth National teams, including the U14, U16, U17, U18, and U23 teams. Enge captained the U16 national team.

Enge attended Pacific Ridge High School. In high school, she played club soccer for LA Galaxy San Diego and SoCal Blues, both in the Elite Clubs National League (ECNL). She played lacrosse at her high school and earned two CIF-San Diego Section lacrosse championships. She has one older brother and two younger sisters. Enge's father, Brian Enge, played soccer for Harvard University and played in the National Professional Soccer League for the Wichita Wings. Enge's mother, Ceci Enge, played lacrosse for Harvard University and works as the coach of Pacific Ridge High School's lacrosse team. As a child, Sierra Enge was a fan of soccer player Alex Morgan who eventually became her teammate on the San Diego Wave. Enge never dreamed that San Diego would someday have a professional women's soccer team.

== College career ==
Enge attended Stanford University, where she played from 2018 to 2022. As a freshman, she did not appear. As a redshirt freshman in her second year, she appeared in 23 of 25 matches. As a redshirt sophomore, starting in 13 games, Enge totaled 4 points (1 goal and 2 assists). As a redshirt junior, she started all 20 matches, logging 1642:03 minutes. Enge scored two goals, and assisted on three more, to finish with seven points. As a redshirt senior, Enge captained the team, starting in all 22 matches, and leading the team to a Pac-12 Championship. During her senior season, she was named Pac-12 Scholar-Athlete of the Year.

== Club career ==
=== San Diego Wave ===
Enge was selected 13th overall in the 2023 NWSL Draft by San Diego Wave FC. In her first season with SD Wave, Enge played in 10 games, starting in 7. In four of her first five games, she played the full 90 minutes. She scored two right footed goals.

In December 2023, Enge changed teams. After she was left unprotected in the 2024 NWSL Expansion Draft, Enge was selected as the final pick by Bay FC. Shortly following the draft, Enge was traded to the Houston Dash for $50,000 in allocation money. San Diego Wave FC then re-acquired Enge from Houston, in exchange for midfielder Belle Briede, a third-round pick in the 2024 NWSL Draft, and $60,000 in allocation money. On August 13, 2024, Enge and the San Diego Wave agreed to a mutual contract termination.

=== Strasbourg ===
On August 16, 2024, Enge signed with French team Strasbourg ahead of the club's first season in the Première Ligue, searching for a place to earn more playing time. She soon became a regular starter for the team as a defensive midfielder, only missing two matches in her first season in France (one due to injury and the other due to suspension). Enge went on to spend two seasons with Strasbourg, making 50 appearances across all competitions, before departing from the club upon the expiration of her contract.

=== Crystal Palace ===
On 3 July 2026, Enge signed with English team Crystal Palace.

== International career ==
Enge attended training camp with the United States under-14 team in 2014.

== Career statistics ==
As of June 18, 2026

Appearances and goals by club, season and competition
Club	Season	League			Cup (Note: Includes the NWSL Challenge Cup and the Coupe de France Féminine)		Playoffs (Note: Includes NWSL Playoffs)		Other		Total	
Club	Season	Division	Apps	Goals	Apps	Goals	Apps	Goals	Apps	Goals	Apps	Goals
San Diego Wave FC	2023	NWSL	10	2	4	0	0	0	—		14	2
San Diego Wave FC	2024	NWSL	1	0	0	0	0	0	3 (Note: Appearances in the 2024 NWSL x Liga MX Femenil Summer Cup)	0	4	0
San Diego Wave FC	Total		11	2	4	0	0	0	3	0	18	2
RC Strasbourg Alsace	2024–25	Première Ligue	20	0	2	1	—		—		22	1
RC Strasbourg Alsace	2025–26	Première Ligue	21	0	4	0	—		—		25	0
RC Strasbourg Alsace	Total		41	0	6	1	0	0	0	0	47	1
Career total			52	2	10	1	0	0	3	0	65	3

== Honors ==
San Diego Wave

- NWSL Challenge Cup: 2024
