= Lauren Brzykcy =

American soccer player (born 1999)

Personal information
- Full name: Lauren Ann Brzykcy
- Date of birth: 8 November 1999 (age 26)
- Place of birth: Laguna Beach, California, U.S.
- Height: 5 ft 10 in (1.78 m)
- Position: Goalkeeper

Team information
- Current team: Bristol City
- Number: 22

Youth career
- SoCal Blues

College career
Years	Team	Apps	(Gls)
2017–2022	UCLA	77	(0)

Senior career*
Years	Team	Apps	(Gls)
2023	San Diego Wave FC	0	(0)
2024	Vittsjö	1	(0)
2025	Piteå IF	26	(0)
2026–	Bristol City	4	(0)

International career^{‡}
2014	United States U17		
2024–	Hungary	18	(0)
- * Club domestic league appearances and goals as of 12 September 2026 ‡ National team caps and goals as of 5 June 2026

Lauren Ann Brzykcy (born 8 November 1999) is a professional soccer goalkeeper who plays for Bristol City. Born in the United States, she represents Hungary internationally.

She played college soccer for UCLA Bruins before being picked 33rd overall in the 2023 NWSL Draft.

== Early life ==
Brzykcy was born in Laguna Beach, California and attended San Clemente High School, where she played varsity soccer and softball. For San Clemente's soccer team, she was named league MVP, All-South Coast League first-team three times, and several coaches referred to her as the best goalkeeper in Orange County. In 2016 and 2017, she was named a NSCAA High School All-American. In 2024, San Clemente retired her jersey number.

She played youth soccer for SoCal Blues, with which she won the 2015 ECNL U15 National Championship.

== College career ==
Brzykcy attended University of California, Los Angeles (UCLA) and played college soccer for the UCLA Bruins from 2017 to 2022.

As a redshirt freshman, she was named to the Pac-12 All-Freshman Team for the 2018 season, finishing with a 0.77 goals against average in eight games.

She played one game for UCLA Bruins softball on 19 May 2019.

For the 2020–21 season, she was named Pac-12 Conference Goalkeeper of the Year and All-Pac-12 First-Team, and was named a United Soccer Coaches Third Team All-American.

For the 2021 season, she was named All-Pac-12 Second-Team.

For the 2022 season, she was again named All-Pac-12 Second-Team. UCLA won the 2022 NCAA Division I women's soccer tournament, as Brzykcy made five saves in the championship match. She finished the 2022 season with 22 wins, tying a UCLA record.

She received a BA in sociology and a master's degree in education from UCLA.

== Club career ==
On 12 January 2023, Brzykcy was selected by San Diego Wave FC in the 2023 NWSL Draft. On 14 March 2023, she signed a two-year contract with San Diego.

On 28 January 2024, Brzykcy and the Wave mutually agreed to terminate her contract. On 29 January, she signed with Swedish club Vittsjö GIK. Brzycky played one game for Vittsjö before suffering a knee injury which required surgery.

On 14 January 2025, Brzykcy signed a two-year contract with Piteå IF. Brzycky played every match for Piteå in the 2025 Damallsvenskan.

On 15 January 2026, Brzykcy signed a two-and-a-half-year contract with Women's Super League 2 side Bristol City. Head coach Charlotte Healy described her as "a very talented goalkeeper who will add to the quality and competition in our goalkeeper department." Brzycky made her Bristol City debut on 31 January, recording a clean sheet against Sunderland.

== International career ==
In June 2014, Brzykcy was named to the United States national under-17 team.

In July 2019, she represented the United States at the 2019 Summer Universiade.

In March 2024, Brzykcy received her first call-up to the Hungary women's national football team. She made her Hungary debut on 25 October 2024 against Scotland.

In December 2025, the Gyula Grosics Goalkeeping Conference named Brzykcy as the Hungarian Women's Goalkeeper of the Year.

== Personal life ==
Brzykcy was born to parents Bill and Andrea, and has one brother, Christopher.

Brzykcy is a native of San Clemente, California. She has surfed as a hobby.

== Career statistics ==
=== Club ===
As of match played 12 September 2026

Appearances and goals by club, season and competition
Club	Season	League			Cup (Note: Includes the NWSL Challenge Cup, Svenska Cupen, and Women's FA Cup)		Playoffs (Note: Includes NWSL playoffs)		Total	
Club	Season	Division	Apps	Goals	Apps	Goals	Apps	Goals	Apps	Goals
San Diego Wave FC	2023	NWSL	0	0	0	0	0	0	0	0
Vittsjö GIK	2024	Damallsvenskan	1	0	2	0	—		3	0
Piteå IF	2025	Damallsvenskan	26	0	2	0	—		28	0
Bristol City W.F.C.	2025–26	WSL2	3	0	1	0	—		4	0
Bristol City W.F.C.	2026–27	WSL2	1	0	—		—		1	0
Career total			31	0	5	0	0	0	36	0

=== International ===
As of match played 5 June 2026

Appearances and goals by national team and year
National team	Year	Apps	Goals
Hungary	2024	4	0
Hungary	2025	9	0
Hungary	2026	5	0
Total		18	0

== Honors ==
San Diego Wave

- NWSL Shield: 2023

UCLA Bruins

- NCAA Division I women's soccer tournament: 2022

Individual

- Pac-12 All-Freshman Team: 2018
- Pac-12 Goalkeeper of the Year: 2020–21
- United Soccer Coaches Third Team All-American: 2020–21
- All-Pac-12 First-Team: 2020–21
- All-Pac-12 Second-Team: 2021, 2022
- United Soccer Coaches NCAA Division I Scholar All-America First-Team: 2020–21
- Gyula Grosics Goalkeeping Conference Hungarian Women's Goalkeeper of the Year: 2025
