= Belle Briede =

American soccer player (born 1998)

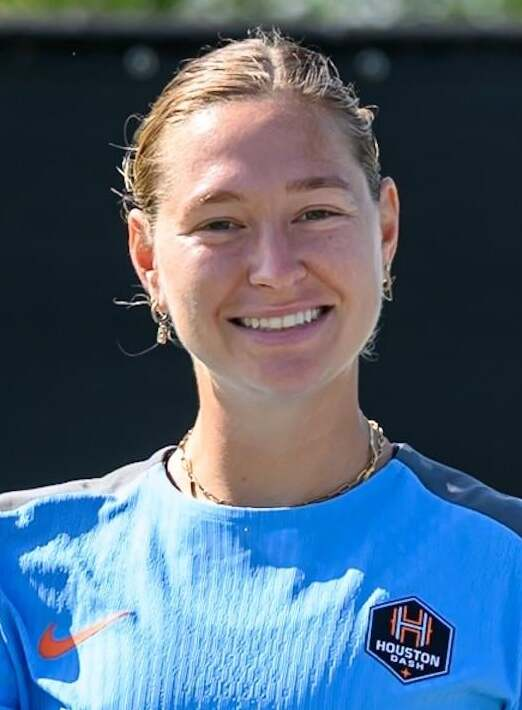
- Briede with the Houston Dash in 2025

Personal information
- Full name: Isabella Lyn Briede
- Date of birth: October 3, 1998 (age 28)
- Place of birth: Alpharetta, Georgia, U.S.
- Height: 5 ft 6 in (1.68 m)
- Position: Midfielder

Team information
- Current team: Slavia Prague
- Number: 4

Youth career
- Tophat Soccer Club

College career
Years	Team	Apps	(Gls)
2017–2021	Stanford Cardinal	94	(10)

Senior career*
Years	Team	Apps	(Gls)
2022–2023	San Diego Wave	26	(2)
2024–2025	Houston Dash	17	(0)
2026–	Slavia Prague	16	(7)

International career
2013	United States U15		
2014–2016	United States U18		
2017	United States U19		
2017	United States U20		
- * Club domestic league appearances and goals as of 7:30, September 12, 2026 (UTC)

Isabella Lyn Briede (born October 3, 1998) is an American professional soccer player who plays as a midfielder for Czech Women's First League club SK Slavia Prague. She played college soccer for the Stanford Cardinal, where she won two national championships, before being drafted by San Diego Wave FC in the third round of the 2022 NWSL Draft. She has also previously played for the Houston Dash.

== Early life ==
Briede was born on October 3, 1998, in Alpharetta, Georgia, to parents Dave and Cathy Briede. She played for Tophat Soccer Club in her youth and graduated from Milton High School in Milton, Georgia. During her youth career, Briede became a 3x NSCAA Youth All-American (2014, 2015, 2016) and was selected to 2x ECNL/id2 National Training Camps (2014, 2016). Briede also became ECNL Southeast Champion (2016), ECNL Southeast Runner-Up (2017) and ECNL National Semifinalist (2017).

== College career ==
Briede played for the Stanford Cardinal from 2017 to 2021, playing primarily as a deep or attacking midfielder. In her Cardinal career, she won two NCAA Championships (2017 and 2019), three Pac-12 Championships (2017, 2018, and 2019), and made three College Cup Appearances (2017, 2018, and 2019). Individually, Briede was honored with 2020-21 All-Pac-12 Third Team, as well as 2018 Pac-12 All-Academic Honorable Mention. In 94 appearances, she scored 10 goals while recording 11 assists.

== Club career ==
=== San Diego Wave ===
San Diego Wave FC drafted Briede with the 27th–overall pick in the 2022 NWSL Draft. During the 2022 season, she scored her first NWSL professional goal on April 17, 2022, against Portland Thorns FC during the 2022 NWSL Challenge Cup, and her first NWSL regular season goal on July 3, 2022, against The Washington Spirit.

During the 2023 season, she recorded her second NWSL regular season goal on May 14, 2023, in a win over the KC Current. Briede and the Wave were awarded the 2023 NWSL Shield for earning the best regular season record in the league. In two seasons for the Wave, Briede played in 26 regular season games scoring 2 goals, as well two playoff games, while appearing in 11 NWSL Challenge Cup contests recording one goal for the franchise.

=== Houston Dash ===
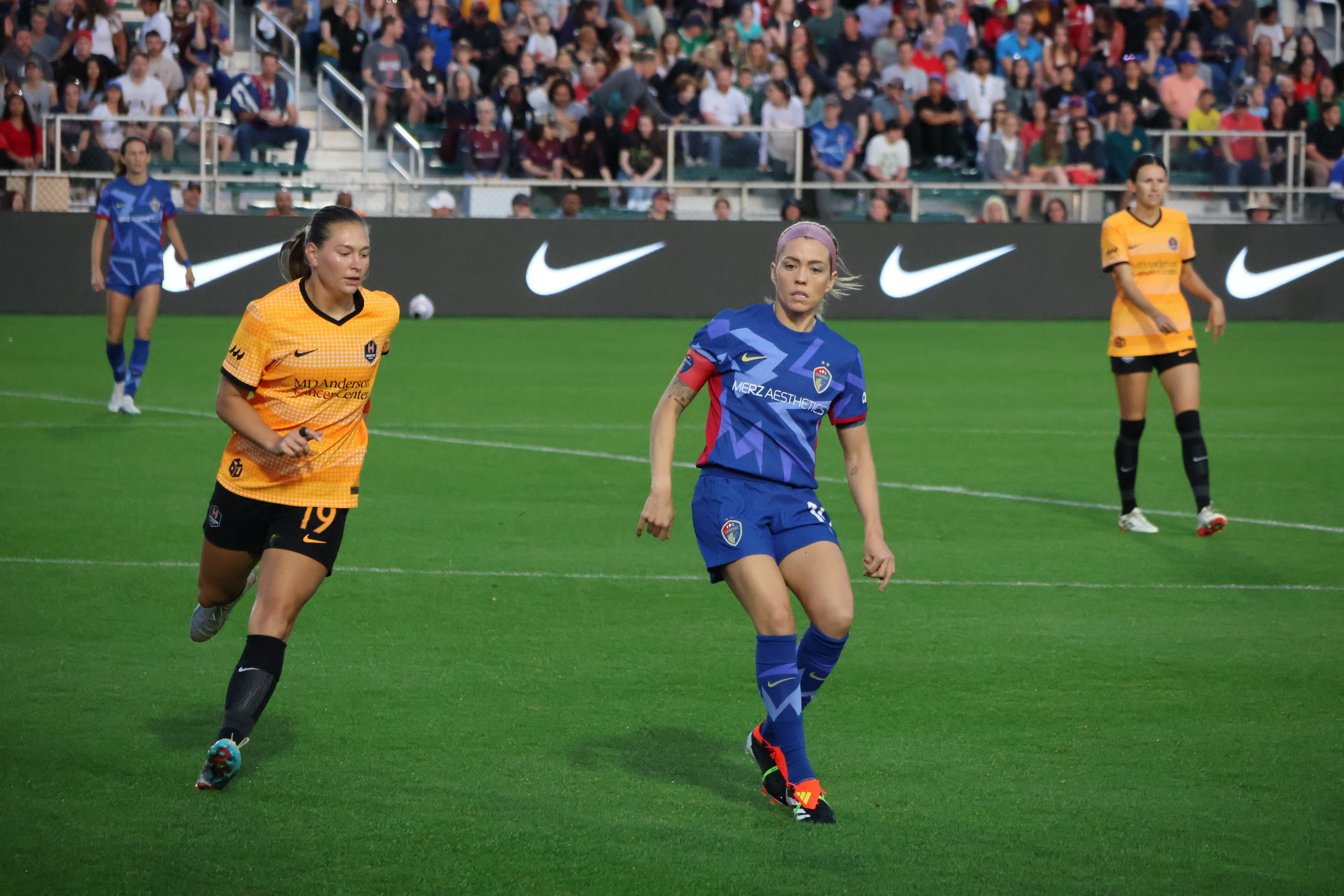
Briede (left) in 2024 against North Carolina Courage

The Houston Dash acquired Briede, a 2024 third-round draft pick, and cash considerations in a trade with San Diego Wave FC in exchange for former teammate Sierra Enge on December 17, 2023, before the start of the 2024 season.

Briede re-signed with the Dash through the 2025 season on December 18, 2024. Upon the expiration of her contract, she had played in 17 regular season games and two appearances in the 2024 NWSL x Liga MX Femenil Summer Cup for the Dash.

=== Slavia Prague ===
On 14 February 2026, Briede signed for Czech club SK Slavia Prague for the 2026 season and made her debut on 15 February in a win over FC Slovan Liberec W. Briede scored her first goal on 21 February in a win over FC Praha and scored her second goal on 10 May in another win over FC Slovácko.

On 5 August, during the 2027 season, Briede scored a goal against Rangers W.F.C. during the UEFA Women's Champions League. On 15 August, Briede scored against FC Viktoria Plzeň W, scored against FC Baník Ostrava on 22 August, scored versus FC Slovan Liberec W on 12 September, scored against FC Slovácko W on 20 September, and scored versus Prague Raptors FC W on 26 September.

== International career ==
Briede participated in U15, U18, U19, and U20 camps with the United States Women's National Soccer Team (USWNT) from 2013 to 2017.

== Personal life ==
In 2022, Briede graduated Stanford University with a Bachelor of Science in Human Biology. In 2017, she graduated from Milton High School.

Briede was born on October 3, 1998, to parents Dave and Cathy Briede. Her father, Dave, played collegiate baseball for Indiana University in 1983, while her older sister, Taylor, attended Auburn University and Kennesaw State University from 2017–21. Both her younger sisters played collegiate soccer: Chloe, a goalkeeper for Indiana University from 2019–21, and Olivia, a forward for the University of Arizona from 2021–22, and the University of Georgia from 2023–24.

== Career statistics ==
As of September 12, 2026

=== College ===
Appearances, goals and assists by College team and year
College team	Year	Apps	Goals	Ast
Stanford Cardinal	2017	19	1	3
Stanford Cardinal	2018	18	2	0
Stanford Cardinal	2019	25	1	4
Stanford Cardinal	2020	14	1	1
Stanford Cardinal	2021	18	5	3
Total		94	10	11

=== Club ===
Appearances and goals by club, season and competition
Club	Season	League			Cup (Note: Includes the NWSL Challenge Cup and Czech Women's Cup)		Playoffs (Note: Includes NWSL Playoffs and UEFA Women's Champions League)		Other (Note: Includes the NWSL x Liga MX Femenil Summer Cup and UEFA Women's Europa Cup)		Total	
Club	Season	Division	Apps	Goals	Apps	Goals	Apps	Goals	Apps	Goals	Apps	Goals
San Diego Wave FC	2022	NWSL	19	1	6	1	2	0	—		27	2
San Diego Wave FC	2023	NWSL	7	1	5	0	0	0	—		12	1
San Diego Wave FC	Total		26	2	11	1	2	0	0	0	39	3
Houston Dash	2024	NWSL	17	0	—		—		2	0	19	0
Houston Dash	2025	NWSL	0	0	—		—		—		0	0
Houston Dash	Total		17	0	0	0	0	0	2	0	19	0
SK Slavia Prague	2026	First League	9	2	2	0	—		—		11	2
SK Slavia Prague	2027	First League	7	5	0	0	2	1	0	0	9	6
SK Slavia Prague	Total		16	7	2	0	2	1	0	0	20	8
Career total			59	9	13	1	4	1	2	0	78	11

== Awards & honors ==
San Diego Wave FC

- NWSL Shield: 2023

Stanford Cardinal

- NCAA Division I Women's Soccer Championship: 2017, 2019
- Pac-12 Champion: 2017, 2018, 2019

Individual

- All-Pac-12 Third Team: 2020-21
- Pac-12 All-Academic Honorable Mention: 2018
