= Vindö =

Coordinates: 59.35°N 18.69°E

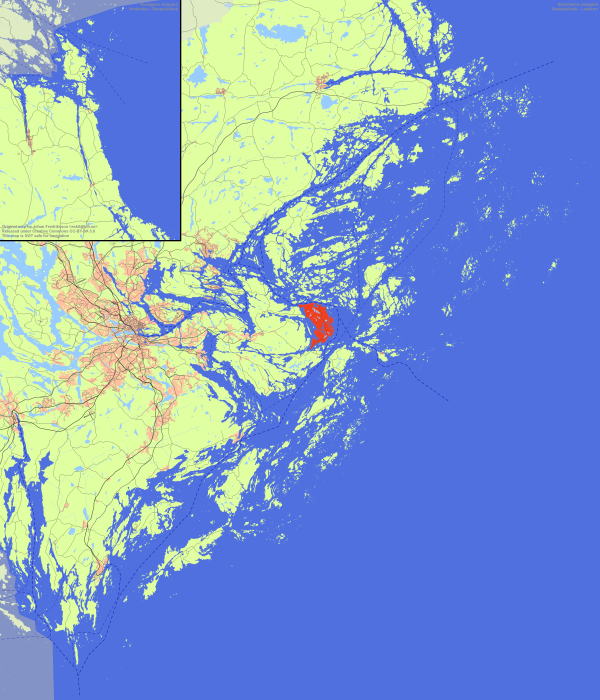
Location of the island Vindö

Vindö is a large, fairly densely populated island in Stockholm County, Svealand, Sweden, in the Stockholm archipelago, between Värmdö and Kanholmsfjärden. The island is cut into by several deep bays, and linked by isthmus to Djurö to the south and Skarpö to the east. Between Vindö-Djurö and Värmdölandet goes a fairway by Vindöström and Simpströmmen.

On the north Vindö are lake Vämlingen joined by the Baltic Sea by Oscar Canal, named after King Oscar II. The king liked to fish for perch in the lake at the time, the Royal Swedish Yacht Club (KSSS) operated in Sollenkroka Fladen (before they moved to Santahamina).

Carl Anton sings about Vindö in "Överbyvals," where the island's beauty during summer is praised.
