= Issachar (given name) =

Issachar (Hebrew: יִשָּׂשכָר, Modern: Yīssaḵar, Tiberian: Yīssāḵār, "reward; recompense") was, according to the Book of Genesis, a son of Jacob and Leah (the fifth son of Leah, and ninth son of Jacob), and the founder of the Israelite tribe of Issachar.

Issachar or Yissakhar may also refer to:

- Issachar Baer Berenstein
- Issachar Bär ben Judah Carmoly
- Issachar Bates
- Issachar ben Mordecai ibn Susan
- Issachar Ber Ryback
- Issachar Berend Lehmann
- Issachar Berman ben Naphtali ha-kohen
- Issachar Dov-Ber Bampi
- Issachar Jacox Roberts
- Issachar Miron, Israeli-American composer, the author of the music of the song Tzena, Tzena, Tzena
- Issachar Perlhefter (c.1650 – after 1713), also known as Behr Perlhefter, Sabbatean rabbi from Prague

== Fictional characters ==
- Don Issachar, minor Jewish character in Voltaire's Candide
- Isaachar, in Andrew Lloyd Webber's Joseph and the Amazing Technicolor Dreamcoat
