= Issachar (disambiguation) =

Issachar (Hebrew: יִשָּׂשכָר, Modern: Yīssaḵar, Tiberian: Yīssāḵār, "reward; recompense") was, according to the Book of Genesis, a son of Jacob and Leah (the fifth son of Leah, and ninth son of Jacob), and the founder of the Israelite Tribe of Issachar.

Issachar may also refer to:

- Tribe of Issachar
- Issachar (given name)
- "Issachar", a song from The Mighty Mighty Bosstones' album Don't Know How to Party
- Disc One: Issachar, of the double album The Circle Maker by John Zorn
