= Naomi Powell =

American soccer player (born 1999)

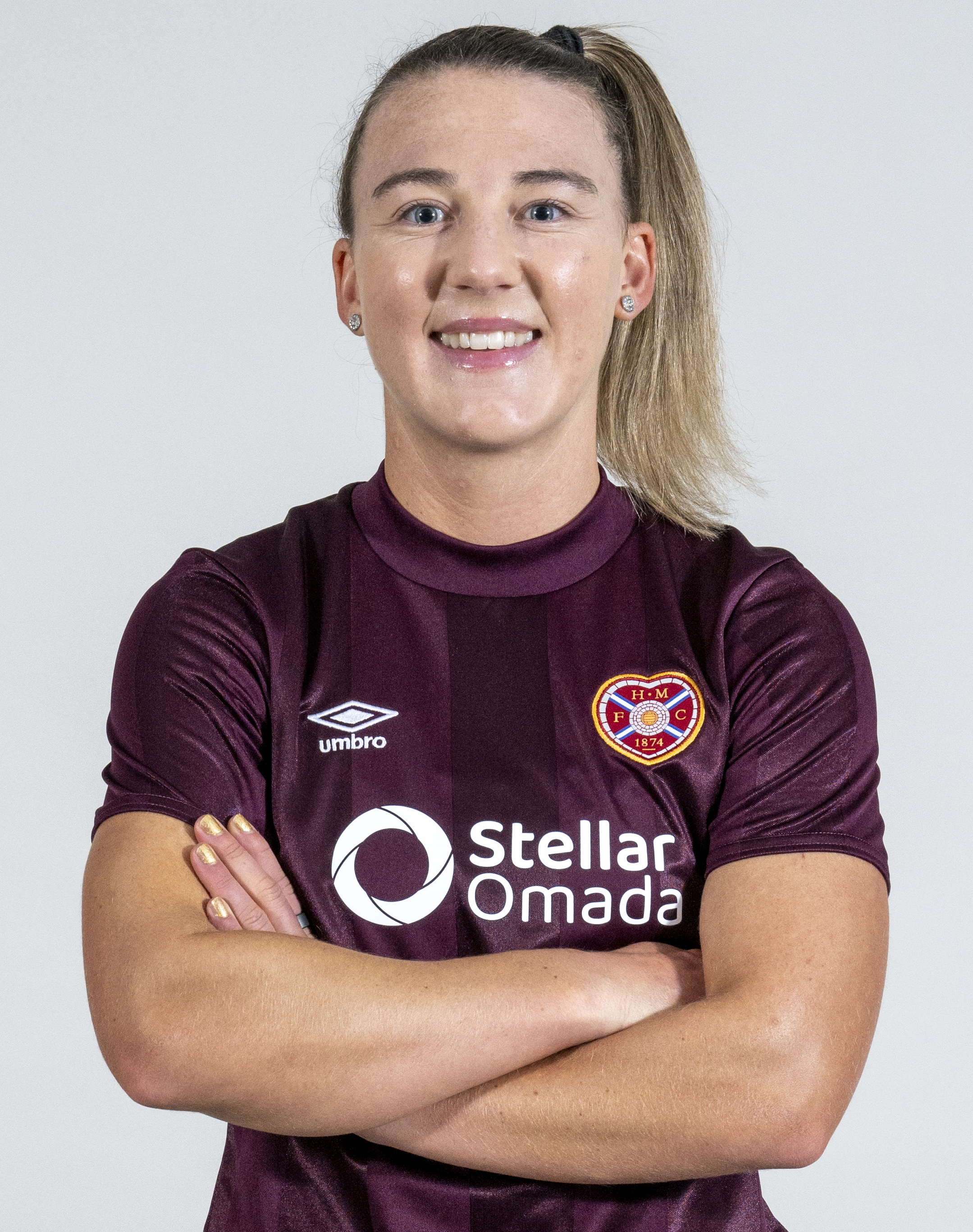
- Powell with Heart of Midlothian in 2024

Personal information
- Date of birth: January 10, 1999 (age 27)
- Height: 5 ft 4 in (1.63 m)
- Position: Midfielder

Team information
- Current team: West Bromwich Albion
- Number: 27

Youth career
- Orlando City ECNL
- Carolina Rapids

College career
Years	Team	Apps	(Gls)
2017–2021	NC State Wolfpack	21	(0)

Senior career*
Years	Team	Apps	(Gls)
2021–2023	Nottingham Forest	40	(1)
2023–2024	Hibernian	28	(1)
2024–2025	Heart of Midlothian	14	(2)
2025	Portland Thorns	0	(0)
2026–	West Bromwich Albion	0	(0)
- * Club domestic league appearances and goals as of 23:41, July 23, 2026 (UTC)

Naomi Powell (born January 10, 1999) is an American professional soccer player who plays as a midfielder for Women's National League North club West Bromwich Albion. She played college soccer for the NC State Wolfpack before starting her professional career abroad with British clubs Nottingham Forest, Hibernian, and Heart of Midlothian. She has also been a member of Portland Thorns FC of the National Women's Soccer League.

== Early life ==
Powell grew up in Charlotte, North Carolina. She is one of two children born to Elise Powell and English soccer coach Darren Powell. She played club soccer for Orlando City SC's Elite Clubs National League squad, where she was named to the 2015 ECNL interregional All-Star team. Powell also played for the Carolina Rapids, where she helped the team to one youth division title.

== College career ==
In her freshman year with the NC State Wolfpack, Powell played in 11 games. She started her career off on a positive note, recording an assist in her debut against Oregon on August 17, 2017. She would go on to tally two more assists as a rookie, generating a college-high sum of 3. Powell did not play in 2018 before rounding out her NC State career with a total of 10 more appearances in her final two seasons. In an April 2021 match against Boston College, she played a career-high 47 minutes in her one and only career start.

== Club career ==
=== Nottingham Forest ===
Powell, who had been named to the ACC Honor Roll in 2018, moved to England and continued her studies at the University of Nottingham after leaving NC State. On July 2, 2021, she signed her first professional contract with nearby club Nottingham Forest of the FA Women's National League North. In her first season with the club, Powell contributed to an FA League Cup campaign in which Forest advanced to the fourth round of the competition before being eliminated by Manchester City, 8–0. During the second round of the cup, Powell also scored a goal to help Forest beat the Wolverhampton Wanderers.

Powell went on to play two more seasons with the club. In her final campaign with Forest, she helped the team win the FA Women's National League Cup and the FA WNL North title. Forest subsequently went on to play against Watford in a bid for promotion to the Women's Championship, but they were ultimately beaten and forced to remain in the English third tier. Across three seasons, Powell ended up recording 60 appearances for Nottingham Forest.

=== Hibernian ===
On July 29, 2023, Powell signed a one-year contract with Scottish first-division side Hibernian. She netted her lone goal for the club in the second game of the season, scoring a free kick in a victory over Montrose. The goal was an omen of things to come, as Powell soon proved to be effective in setting up goals. She ended up totaling 10 assists in her single season at Hibernian, many of which came from set piece situations. Ultimately, Powell ended up contributing to a Hibernian fifth-place finish, the same place in the table as the season prior.

=== Heart of Midlothian ===
In July 2024, Powell joined Hibernian rivals Heart of Midlothian. She recorded 2 goals in 14 Scottish Women's Premier League appearances. Despite having inked a two-year deal, Powell ended up leaving Hearts after only one year of play. Her official departure was announced on June 5, 2025.

=== Portland Thorns ===
Powell returned to the United States and joined NWSL club Portland Thorns FC on July 23, 2025. She signed a short-term contract with the team lasting through August 2025. One month later, the Thorns extended Powell through the end of the 2025 season. Upon the expiration of her contract, Powell departed from Portland; she did not make a competitive appearance for the club.

=== West Bromwich Albion ===
In July 2026, Powell joined English club West Bromwich Albion, returning for a second stint in the Women's National League North.

== Honors ==
Nottingham Forest

- FA Women's National League North: 2022–23
- FA Women's National League Cup: 2022–23
