= Moira Kelley =

American soccer player (born 2002)

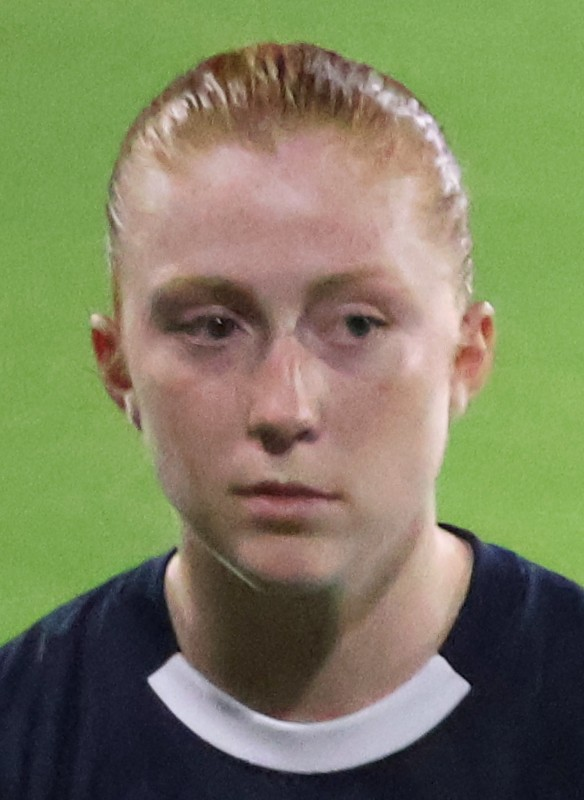
- Kelley with Virginia in 2024

Personal information
- Date of birth: February 16, 2002 (age 24)
- Place of birth: Overland Park, Kansas, U.S.
- Height: 5 ft 9 in (1.75 m)
- Position: Center back

Team information
- Current team: Nantes
- Number: 26

Youth career
- Sporting Blue Valley

College career
Years	Team	Apps	(Gls)
2020–2023	Kansas Jayhawks	64	(1)
2024	Virginia Cavaliers	19	(0)

Senior career*
Years	Team	Apps	(Gls)
2025	Portland Thorns	0	(0)
2025	Linköping FC	11	(1)
2026	Saint-Étienne	11	(1)
2026–	Nantes	0	(0)
- * Club domestic league appearances and goals as of 17:08, June 29, 2026 (UTC)

Moira Kelley (born February 16, 2002) is an American professional soccer player who plays as a defender for Première Ligue club FC Nantes. She played college soccer for the Kansas Jayhawks and the Virginia Cavaliers before starting her professional career with Portland Thorns FC of the National Women's Soccer League and Linköping FC of the Damallsvenskan. She has also previously been a member of Saint-Étienne.

== Early life ==
Kelley was born and raised in Overland Park, Kansas. She attended Saint Thomas Aquinas High School and played one season of high school soccer. In her single campaign with Saint Thomas Aquinas, she helped the team win state, regional, and district championships. She became the only freshman named to the Mo-Kan All-Tournament Team at the end of the season. Kelley played most of her youth soccer career for the KC Legends Soccer Club. Her mother, Kim, has been their bookkeeper for 20 years. She later played for ECNL club Sporting Blue Valley, a member of the US Soccer Development Academy. In 2018, she gained international experience as a member of the Generation Adidas Olympique Lyonnais team.

== College career ==
=== Kansas Jayhawks ===
In 2020, Kelley followed in the footsteps of her mother, aunt, and uncle by enrolling at the University of Kansas. She went on to play four seasons with the Kansas Jayhawks, eventually ascending to the role of a veteran starter. In her first college season, she was named to the Big 12 All-Freshman team and Academic All-Big 12 Rookie Team. She recorded her first collegiate assist in March 2021, passing the ball to Rylan Childers in a 1–1 draw with the Iowa State Cyclones. Kelley's assist and general performance earned her a Big 12 Freshman of the Week award to help cap off her rookie campaign. The following season, she started all 19 of Kansas' matches and led the team in minutes. She continued to earn ample playing time in her third year before being sidelined by a season-ending injury in October 2022.

Kelley made a full recovery and punctuated her return to the field with a bang, scoring her first college goal in the Jayhawks' home opener on August 24, 2023. Her goal, an intended cross from nearby the midfield line, opened the scoring in a 1–1 tie with the Vanderbilt Commodores. She ended up registering a career-high 3 assists and played in 18 games in her final season with Kansas. She completed her time as a Jayhawk with 64 appearances, all of which were starts. Additionally, Kelley, who had a 4.37 GPA in high school, found her continued success in the classroom marked by Academic All-Big 12 First Team mentions in each of her final three years.

=== Virginia Cavaliers ===
Using the extra year of NCAA eligibility granted to players due to the COVID-19 pandemic, Kelley transferred to the University of Virginia and played one season with the Cavaliers. She started all of the team's games, playing full minutes in 12 of the 19 matches she appeared in. She helped lead Virginia's backline to a defensive campaign in which they recorded 10 shutouts on the year. At the end of the season, Kelley was named to the ACC Women’s Soccer All-Academic Team.

== Club career ==
Kelley trained with Seattle Reign FC as a non-roster invitee during the team's 2025 preseason. She did not sign a contract with the club and later became a preseason trialist with the Reign's Cascadian rivals, Portland Thorns FC. On March 14, 2025, she inked her first professional deal with Portland, signing a short-term contract through June 2025. She made her professional debut on May 24, starting and playing one half in the game for third place at the 2024–25 CONCACAF W Champions Cup. It would prove to be her only appearance with Portland before her contract expired midway through the season.

On July 12, 2025, Kelley signed with Swedish club Linköping FC through the end of the 2025 Damallsvenskan. She scored her first Damallsvenskan goal in October 2025, netting in an eventual defeat to Malmö FF. She played in 11 matches for Linköping (all starts) as the club finished second-to-last in the league and were relegated down to the Elitettan.

On January 8, 2026, Kelley signed a contract with French club Saint-Étienne, lasting through the end of the 2025–26 Première Ligue. She made her club debut three days later, participating in a Coupe de France game against OL Lyonnes on January 11. On March 28, 2026, Kelley scored her first Première Ligue goal, the game-winner against Lens. She made 11 league appearances for Saint-Étienne, operating as a center back or right back, as the club finished at the bototm of the table and were relegated to the Seconde Ligue.

In July 2026, Kelley signed for fellow French side FC Nantes on a two-year deal until 2028.

== Career statistics ==
=== Club ===
As of June 29, 2026

Appearances and goals by club, season and competition
Club	Season	League			Cup		Playoffs (Note: Includes NWSL Playoffs)		Continental (Note: Includes the CONCACAF W Champions Cup)		Total	
Club	Season	Division	Apps	Goals	Apps	Goals	Apps	Goals	Apps	Goals	Apps	Goals
Portland Thorns FC	2025	NWSL	0	0	—		—		1	0	1	0
Linköping FC	2025	Damallsvenskan	11	1	—		—		—		11	1
AS Saint-Étienne	2025–26	Première Ligue	11	1	1 (Note: Appearance(s) in the Coupe de France Féminine)	0	—		—		12	1
Career total			22	2	1	0	0	0	1	0	24	2
