= Hanna Lundkvist =

Swedish footballer (born 2002)

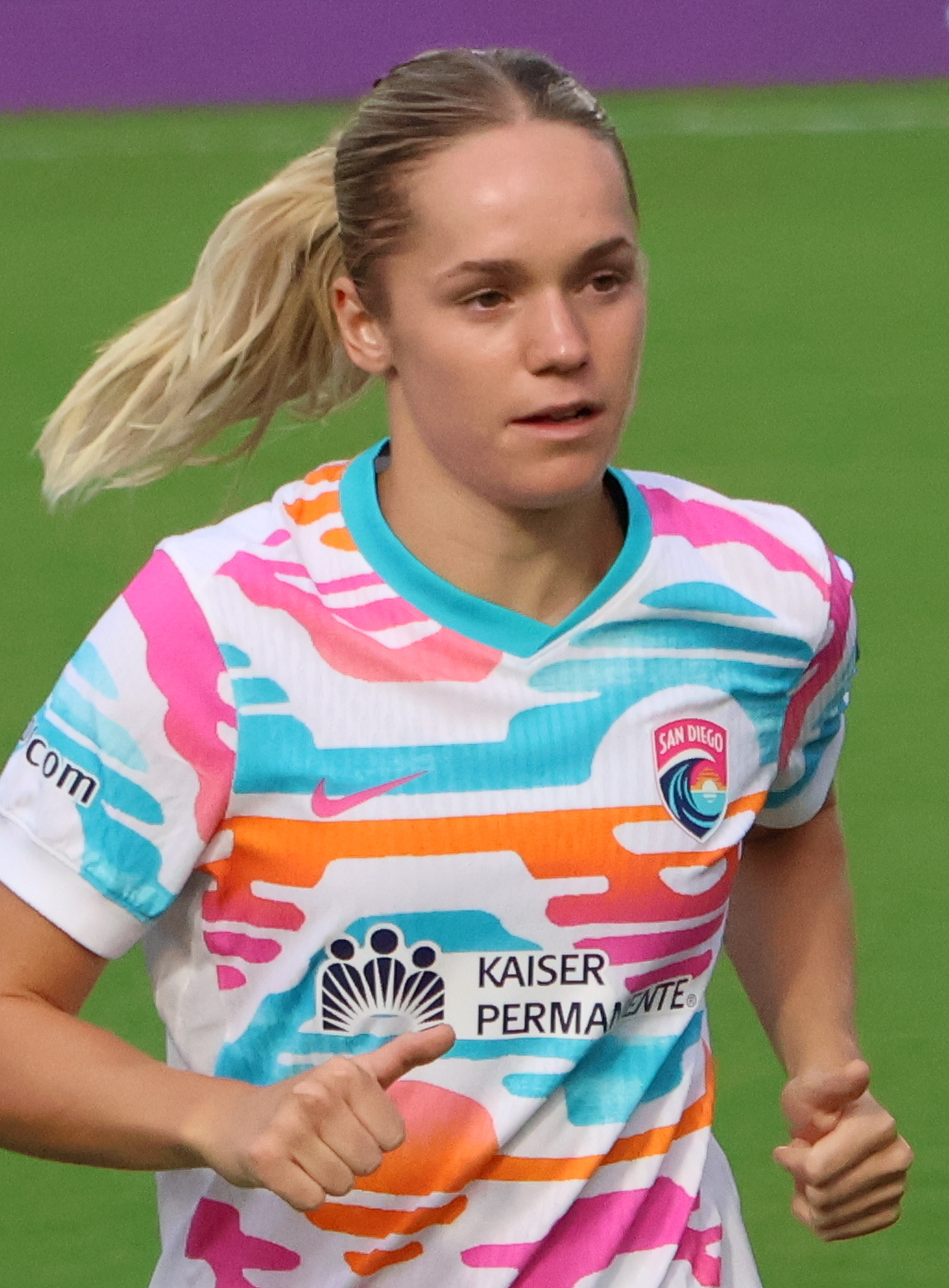
- Lundkvist with the San Diego Wave in 2025

Personal information
- Full name: Hanna Ester Lundkvist
- Date of birth: 17 July 2002 (age 24)
- Place of birth: Djurö, Sweden
- Height: 1.67 m (5 ft 6 in)
- Position: Right-back

Team information
- Current team: Manchester United
- Number: 5

Youth career
- Djurö-Vindö IF

Senior career*
Years	Team	Apps	(Gls)
2018	AIK	1	(1)
2019–2021	Hammarby	72	(5)
2021–2024	Atlético Madrid	34	(0)
2024–2025	San Diego Wave	49	(3)
2026–	Manchester United	22	(1)

International career^{‡}
2018–2019r	Sweden U17	19	(2)
2019–2020	Sweden U19	12	(3)
2021–2022	Sweden U23	12	(0)
2022–	Sweden	35	(2)
- * Club domestic league appearances and goals as of 18:45, 22 November 2026 (UTC) ‡ National team caps and goals as of 11:30, 14 October 2026 (UTC)

Hanna Ester Lundkvist (born 17 July 2002) is a Swedish professional footballer who plays as a right-back for English Women's Super League club Manchester United and the Sweden national team. She has previously played for AIK, Hammarby, in Spain for Atlético Madrid, and in the United States for San Diego Wave FC.

== Club career ==
=== AIK ===
Lundkvist grew up on Djurö, an island in the Stockholm Archipelago. After starting her playing career at Djurö-Vindö IF, Lundkvist joined AIK in 2018. With AIK, she won the Gothia Cup twice, earned two consecutive golds in the Swedish U16 Championship, and one gold in the Swedish U15 Futsal Championship.

She made her professional debut on 2 June 2018, scoring a consolation goal in a 3–1 loss against Kvarnsvedens IK in a Swedish second-division match. In November 2018, she played her second match with the first team, this time in the Swedish Women's Cup.

=== Hammarby ===
In 2019, Lundkvist and her teammate Felicia Saving signed with Hammarby. She made her debut on February 9 in the Swedish Cup with a 3–2 victory over Ljusdals IF. On June 6, she scored her first goal for her new club against Umeå IK FF. In her first season, she played every match, scoring 4 goals and providing 9 assists, narrowly missing promotion after finishing third. In her second season, she moved to right-back and again played in every match. This time, Hammarby finished second and secured promotion to Sweden's top division.

Lundkvist made her top-division debut on 18 April 2021, in a 1–0 loss to BK Häcken. Her only goal in the top division came on August 28, but it did not prevent her team from a heavy defeat. Hammarby finished mid-table, and Lundkvist played in 20 of the 22 league matches.

=== Atlético Madrid ===
In December 2021, Lundkvist signed with Atlético de Madrid. She made her debut on 12 January 2022, in a win over Villarreal. During her first months at the club, she had limited playing time. Atlético finished fourth in the league. She extended her contract in the summer of 2022 until 2026.

=== San Diego Wave ===
In February 2024, NWSL club San Diego Wave FC announced the signing of Lundkvist from Atlético Madrid in exchange for an undisclosed transfer fee. She made her club debut in the NWSL Challenge Cup on 15 March 2024, playing a full 90 minutes in a match against NJ/NY Gotham FC. The Wave would go on to win the match 1–0 on a goal from Alex Morgan, marking Lundkvist's first piece of silverware with her new club. Lundkvist scored her first NWSL goal on 12 May 2024, tallying the equalizer in another match against Gotham FC. She notched both of her 2024 assists during the CONCACAF W Champions Cup, assisting Kristen McNabb against Panamanian club Santa Fe and assisting Amirah Ali against Whitecaps FC Girls Elite. At the end of the season, Lundkvist and the Wave agreed to exercise Lundkvist's mutual contract option, keeping her in San Diego for 2025. She ended her first NWSL campaign with 23 regular season appearances and two goals.

On 25 May 2025, Lundkvist registered her first assist of the year in a 5–2 win over the North Carolina Courage. The victory set the Wave's record for goals scored in a single game, and served to extend the team's unbeaten streak to six games, also a club record. Over the course of the season, Lundkvist cemented herself as a core part of San Diego's starting lineup, appearing in all 26 games and ranking third on the Wave in regular season minutes played. She helped the club finish sixth in the NWSL and qualify for the playoffs, where she played over 100 minutes of the Wave's extra-time quarterfinal defeat to the Portland Thorns. She made 49 NWSL appearances in her two years at San Diego.

=== Manchester United ===
On 27 December 2025, it was announced that Lundkvist had agreed to join Women's Super League club Manchester United on a three-and-a-half year deal, joining on 1 January 2026. She made her debut for the club on 10 January, coming on as a 71st minute substitute in a 0–0 draw against Arsenal.

== International career ==
In November 2020, Lundkvist was called up to Sweden's national under-23 squad for the first time for a camp including an unofficial friendly against Kopparbergs/Göteborg, but withdrew before it started. In September 2021, she was called up for a friendly match against Netherlands, in which she made her debut at the under-23 level.

In November 2022, Lundkvist was called up to the Swedish senior national team for a friendly match against Australia. In February 2023, Lundkvist made her senior national debut, playing 76 minutes for Sweden in a friendly match against China in Marbella. On 13 June 2023, she was included in the 23-player squad for the 2023 FIFA Women's World Cup. The following month she was withdrawn from the squad due to an ankle injury that occurred while warming up ahead of a friendly against the Philippines.

Lundkvist was named to represent Sweden at the UEFA Women's Euro 2025. She started two of Sweden's three group stage matches, helping the team go unbeaten in all three games and finish at the top of the group. She also started Sweden's quarterfinal match against England, playing 61 minutes as Sweden were eventually vanquished on penalties.

== Career statistics ==
=== Club ===
As of 22 November 2026

Appearances and goals by club, season and competition
Club	Season	League			Cup (Note: Includes the Svenska Cupen, Copa de la Reina, Supercopa Femenina, NWSL Challenge Cup, Women's FA Cup and Women's League Cup)		Continental (Note: Includes CONCACAF W Champions Cup and UEFA Women's Champions League)		Other		Total	
Club	Season	Division	Apps	Goals	Apps	Goals	Apps	Goals	Apps	Goals	Apps	Goals
AIK	2018	Elitettan	1	0	1	0	—		—		2	0
Hammarby	2019	Elitettan	26	1	4	0	—		—		30	1
Hammarby	2020	Elitettan	26	3	0	0	—		—		26	3
Hammarby	2021	Damallsvenskan	20	1	4	0	—		—		24	1
Hammarby	Total		72	5	8	0	—		—		80	5
Atlético Madrid	2021–22	Liga F	5	0	2	0	—		—		7	0
Atlético Madrid	2022–23	Liga F	23	0	4	1	—		—		27	1
Atlético Madrid	2023–24	Liga F	6	0	1	0	—		—		7	0
Atlético Madrid	Total		34	0	7	1	—		—		41	1
San Diego Wave FC	2024	NWSL	23	2	1	0	4	0	1 (Note: Appearances in the NWSL x Liga MX Femenil Summer Cup)	0	29	2
San Diego Wave FC	2025	NWSL	26	1	—		—		1 (Note: Appearances in the NWSL playoffs)	0	27	1
San Diego Wave FC	Total		49	3	1	0	4	0	2	0	56	3
Manchester United	2025–26	Women's Super League	11	1	4	0	3	1	0	0	18	2
Manchester United	2026–27	Women's Super League	11	0	3	0	—		0	0	14	0
Manchester United	Total		22	1	7	0	3	1	0	0	32	2
Career total			178	9	24	1	7	1	2	0	211	11

=== International ===
As of 13 October 2026

Appearances and goals by national team and year
National team	Year	Apps	Goals
Sweden	2022	0	0
Sweden	2023	8	0
Sweden	2024	9	0
Sweden	2025	12	0
Sweden	2026	6	2
Total		35	2

Scores and results list England's goal tally first, score column indicates score after each Lundkvist goal.

List of international goals scored by Hanna Lundkvist
No.	Date	Venue	Opponent	Score	Result	Competition
1.	9 June 2026	Gamla Ullevi, Gothenburg, Sweden	Italy	1–2	2–2	2027 FIFA Women's World Cup qualification
2.	13 October 2026	Nationalarenan, Solna, Sweden	Lithuania	4–0	10–0	2027 FIFA Women's World Cup qualification play-offs

== Honors ==
San Diego Wave

- NWSL Challenge Cup: 2024

Manchester United

- Women's League Cup runner-up: 2025–26
