= Julie Dufour (footballer) =

French footballer (born 2001)

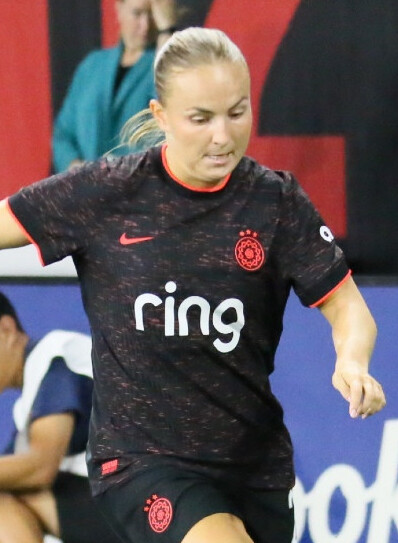
- Dufour with the Portland Thorns in 2025

Personal information
- Date of birth: 29 May 2001 (age 25)
- Place of birth: Valenciennes, France
- Height: 1.63 m (5 ft 4 in)
- Position: Forward

Team information
- Current team: Portland Thorns
- Number: 17

Youth career
- 2010–2013: ES Fenain
- 2013–2016: US Escaudain

Senior career*
Years	Team	Apps	(Gls)
2017–2020	Lille	40	(9)
2020–2023	Bordeaux	57	(3)
2023–2024	Paris FC	31	(13)
2025	Angel City	10	(0)
2025–	Portland Thorns	6	(2)

International career^{‡}
2017	France U16	7	(0)
2017–2018	France U17	8	(4)
2018–2020	France U19	19	(1)
2019	France U20	5	(0)
2021–2024	France U23	12	(1)
2023–2024	France	8	(0)
Medal record
Women's football
Representing France
UEFA Women's Nations League
Runner-up	2024
UEFA Women's Under-19 Championship
Winner	2019 Scotland
- * Club domestic league appearances and goals as of 17:56, 11 November 2026 (UTC) ‡ National team caps and goals as of 2 December 2024

Julie Dufour (born 29 May 2001) is a French professional footballer who plays as a forward for Portland Thorns FC of the National Women's Soccer League (NWSL).

== Club career ==
Dufour started her senior career with Lille and helped the team to reach the final of 2018–19 Coupe de France, which they eventually lost to Lyon.

In April 2020, Dufour moved to Bordeaux on a three-year deal.

On 9 June 2023, Paris FC announced the signing of Dufour on a two-year deal until June 2025. During the UEFA Women's Champions League qualifying rounds in October 2023, she scored goals against VfL Wolfsburg in both home and away matches to help her club reach the group stages of the competition for the first time.

On 17 December 2024, Dufour joined Angel City on a three-year contract until December 2027. She made her NWSL debut with Angel City on 16 March 2025 by coming on as a substitute in the home opener against San Diego Wave FC to close out the match and secure a 1–1 draw. Dufour went on to play in 9 more matches for Angel City, recording a total of 10.

On 23 August 2025, Angel City traded Dufour and an NWSL international roster spot to Portland Thorns FC in exchange for $40,000 in intra-league transfer funds. The very same day, Dufour made her Thorns debut in a 2–0 loss to the Kansas City Current. On 29 August, she scored her first NWSL goal, volleying the ball into the back of the net during stoppage time of a home defeat to the Utah Royals. One month after joining the Thorns, Dufour was placed on Portland's season-ending injury list after sustaining an ACL injury against San Diego Wave FC on September 20.

== International career ==
Dufour is a former France youth international. She was part of the France under-19 squad which won the 2019 UEFA Under-19 Championship.

In February 2021, Dufour received her first call-up to the France national team, when she was named in the 27-player squad for the 2021 Tournoi de France. The tournament later got cancelled due to COVID-19 pandemic in Europe and it was decided that France would play two friendly matches against Switzerland instead. However, Dufour couldn't feature in either matches as she was pulled out of the squad due to injury.

On 27 October 2023, Dufour made her senior debut for France in a 2–1 UEFA Women's Nations League win against Norway.

== Career statistics ==
=== Club ===
As of 23 August 2025

Appearances and goals by club, season and competition
Club	Season	League			Cup		Continental		Other		Total	
Club	Season	Division	Apps	Goals	Apps	Goals	Apps	Goals	Apps	Goals	Apps	Goals
Lille	2017–18	Première Ligue	5	0	0	0	—		—		5	0
Lille	2018–19	Première Ligue	21	2	4	0	—		—		25	2
Lille	2019–20	Seconde Ligue	14	7	3	1	—		—		17	8
Lille	Total		40	9	7	1	0	0	0	0	47	10
Bordeaux	2020–21	Première Ligue	16	1	1	0	—		—		17	1
Bordeaux	2021–22	Première Ligue	20	1	1	0	2 (Note: Appearances in UEFA Women's Champions League)	0	—		23	1
Bordeaux	2022–23	Première Ligue	21	1	3	1	—		—		24	2
Bordeaux	Total		57	3	5	1	2	0	0	0	64	4
Paris FC	2023–24	Première Ligue	20	7	4	1	9	7	2 (Note: Appearances in playoffs)	0	35	15
Paris FC	2024–25	Première Ligue	11	6	0	0	4	2	—		15	8
Paris FC	Total		31	13	4	1	13	9	2	0	50	23
Angel City FC	2025	NWSL	10	0	—		—		—		10	0
Portland Thorns FC	2025	NWSL	1	0	—		—		—		1	0
Career total			139	25	16	3	15	9	2	0	172	37

=== International ===
As of match played 29 October 2024

Appearances and goals by national team and year
National team	Year	Apps	Goals
France	2023	4	0
France	2024	4	0
Total		8	0

== Honours ==
France U19

- UEFA Women's Under-19 Championship: 2019

France

- UEFA Women's Nations League runner-up: 2023–24

Individual

- UEFA Women's Under-19 Championship Team of the Tournament: 2019
