= Mya Jones =

Canadian soccer player (born 2001)

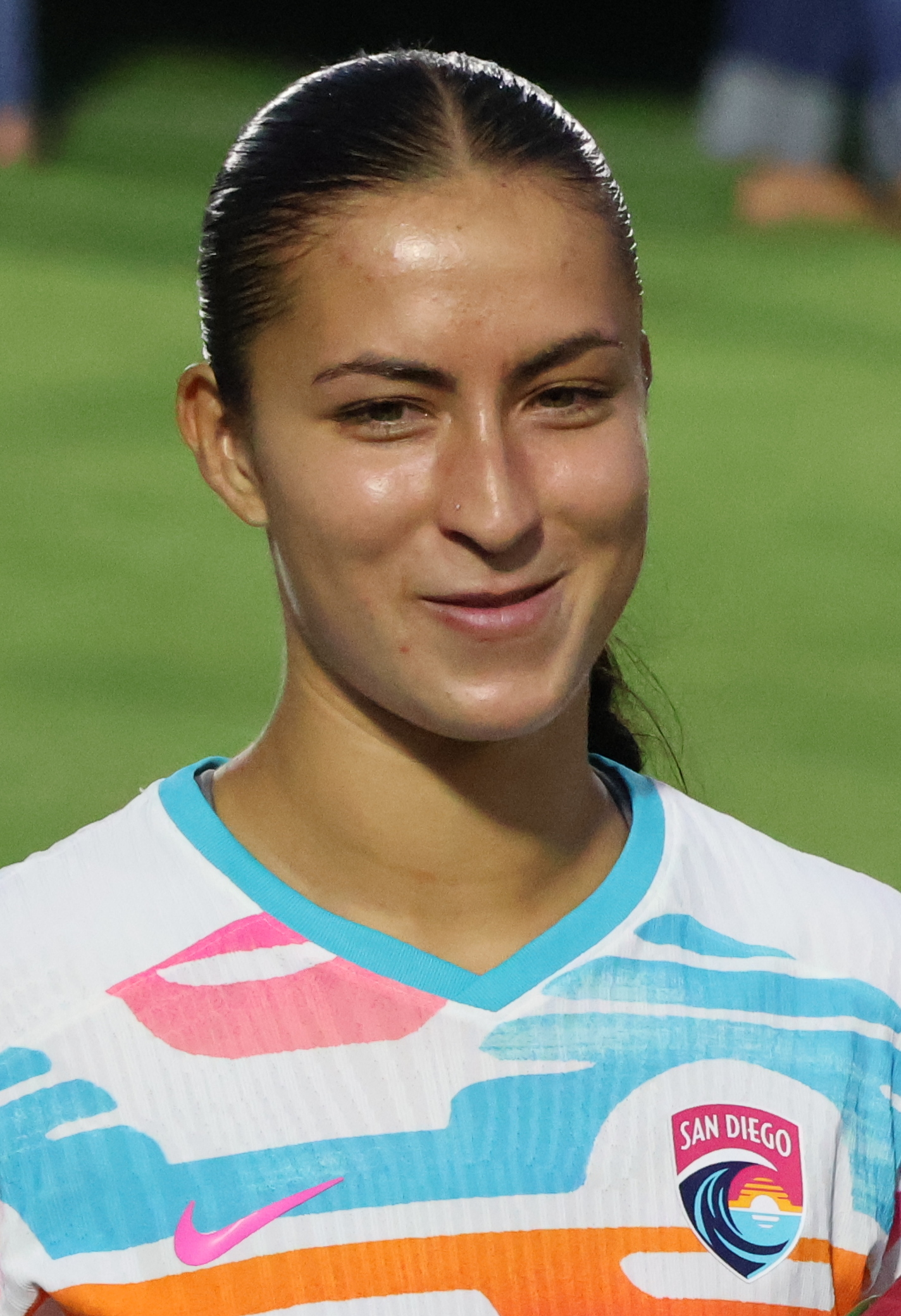
- Jones with the San Diego Wave in 2024

Personal information
- Full name: Mya Rilaine Charmaine Jones
- Date of birth: August 1, 2001 (age 25)
- Place of birth: Calgary, Alberta, Canada
- Height: 5 ft 7 in (1.70 m)
- Position: Forward

Team information
- Current team: Calgary Wild
- Number: 99

Youth career
- Calgary Foothills

College career
Years	Team	Apps	(Gls)
2019–2023	Memphis Tigers	93	(26)

Senior career*
Years	Team	Apps	(Gls)
2017–2019	Calgary Foothills	15	(4)
2022–2023	Calgary Foothills		
2024–2025	San Diego Wave	19	(2)
2025	→ AFC Toronto (loan)	0	(0)
2026–	Calgary Wild	18	(2)

International career
2014–2016	Canada U15	9	(2)
2020	Canada U20	3	(0)
- * Club domestic league appearances and goals as of October 28, 2026

Mya Rilaine Charmaine Jones (born August 1, 2001) is a Canadian professional soccer player who plays as a forward for Northern Super League club Calgary Wild FC. She played college soccer for the Memphis Tigers before being selected by the San Diego Wave in the 2024 NWSL Draft. She has represented Canada internationally at the under-15 and under-20 levels.

== Early life ==
Jones was born in Calgary, Alberta, to parents Jason Jones and Kristin Sherriff. In high school, Jones ran track and field and was a six-time academic honoree. She played youth soccer with Calgary Foothills WFC, competing with the club from ages 12 to 21. Additionally, Jones played with the Alberta South REX program and trained with the Whitehaps FC Girls Elite REX program in her youth.

== College career ==
Jones played on the Memphis Tigers women's soccer team for five seasons, playing as a forward and a midfielder. She scored her first collegiate goal on September 12, 2019, in a 6–0 win over Southeastern Louisiana. Jones completed her first year at Memphis with 3 goals and 8 assists, ranking second in single-season assists by a freshman at her school. She was also included in the 2019 AAC All-Rookie Team, the 2019 AAC All-Conference First Team, and she was named the 2019 AAC Rookie of the Year.

As a sophomore, Jones started in all 12 of Memphis' matches, recording 4 assists. Her only goal of the season came in a 3–1 defeat to Ole Miss on March 1, 2021. She was named the 2020–21 AAC Midfielder of the Year for her performances. Growing into a more attacking threat in her junior year, Jones scored one more goal than the season prior, ending the year with 2. She played for the Tigers in 19 matches, starting in each one. In 2021, Jones was named to the AAC All-Conference Second Team and the 2021 AAC Preseason All-Conference Team.

In her senior year, Jones played and started in 19 games, similarly to the previous season. She was the team leader in goals, scoring 9, including 3 game-winners. She also finished the season with 2 assists. Jones made the 2022 AAC All-Conference First Team and the 2022 United Soccer Coaches All-South Region First Team.

In her final year at Memphis, Jones led the Tigers in assists, notching 11. She also scored 11 goals, the second-highest on the team. Her goal tally was the highest in the entire AAC in conference play. Jones had three multi-goal games over the course of two months near the end of 2023. She finished the season with 22 matches under her belt, each of them starts. She also received numerous accolades for her 2023 performance, including the AAC Championship Most Outstanding Offensive Player title and a unanimously-decided AAC Offensive Player of the Year award. Jones was named to the 2023 AAC Championship All-Tournament Team and the 2023 AAC All-Conference First Team, as well. Finally, Jones was named to the MAC Hermann Trophy Watchlist in 2023. Jones finished her college career with 26 goals in 93 matches played.

== Club career ==
=== Calgary Foothills ===
From 2017 to 2019, she played with Calgary Foothills WFC in United Women's Soccer. She also played with them in 2022 and 2023 and was named the 2022 All-United Women’s Soccer Most Valuable Player.

=== San Diego Wave ===
On January 12, 2024, Jones was selected by San Diego Wave FC as the 14th pick in the third round of the 2024 NWSL Draft. She was the 42nd overall pick and became the first player from the University of Memphis to be drafted into the National Women's Soccer League. The Wave signed Jones to a two-year contract to start her professional career. Jones made her NWSL debut on April 27, 2024. In her first appearance, she was named to the starting lineup and contributed to a 2–1 victory over Bay FC. Jones scored her first professional goal on June 19, 2024, in a 2–1 defeat to NJ/NY Gotham FC. In the 48th minute of the game, Jones intercepted a pass from opposing goalkeeper Ann-Katrin Berger and outmuscled her defender before scoring with her left foot.

In February 2025, she was loaned to AFC Toronto of the Northern Super League for the 2025 season. Battling injury concerns, she did not appear for Toronto as the team finished atop the NSL table and finished as the runner-ups in the playoffs. Following her loan spell, Jones was left without a club after not re-signing with San Diego upon the expiration of her rookie contract.

=== Calgary Wild ===
On February 19, 2026, it was announced that Jones had signed with NSL side Calgary Wild FC, with head coach Lydia Bedford saying "She brings pace, creativity, and the ability to play across the forward line. She's one of the top players Calgary has produced, and bringing her home as she continues her professional career is special for our club and our community." On her debut with the Wild, in her first match since 2014, Jones would score a brace in a 2-2 draw with the Montreal Roses.

== International career ==
Jones has represented Canada at U-15, U-17, and U-20 levels. She was 12 years of age when she made her youth team debut under eventual Canada women's national soccer team coach Bev Priestman. Jones was also part of the Canada team that won the 2014 CONCACAF Girls' U-15 Championship and earned a silver medal at the 2016 CONCACAF Girls' U-15 Championship. In 2020, Jones appeared in the 2020 CONCACAF Women's U-20 Championship, where Canada made it to the quarterfinals before being eliminated by the United States.

== Career statistics ==
As of October 28, 2026

Appearances and goals by club, season and competition
Club	Season	League			Playoffs (Note: Includes NWSL Playoffs)		Cup (Note: Includes the NWSL Challenge Cup)		Continental (Note: Includes CONCACAF W Champions Cup)		Other		Total	
Club	Season	Division	Apps	Goals	Apps	Goals	Apps	Goals	Apps	Goals	Apps	Goals	Apps	Goals
San Diego Wave FC	2024	NWSL	19	2	—		0	0	4	0	1 (Note: Includes NWSL x Liga MX Femenil Summer Cup)	0	24	2
AFC Toronto (loan)	2025	Northern Super League	0	0	0	0	0	0	0	0	0	0	0	0
Calgary Wild FC	2026	Northern Super League	18	2	0	0	1	1	0	0	0	0	19	3
Career total			37	4	0	0	1	1	4	0	1	0	43	5

== Honors ==
San Diego Wave

- NWSL Challenge Cup: 2024
