= Carl Anton =

Carl Anton (Latin: Carolus Antonius; 11 September 1722 – ?) born Moses Gershon Cohen (Hebrew: משה־גרשון כהן), was a Curonian writer and Hebraist.

== Biography ==
Moses Gershon Cohen was born to a Jewish family in Mitau, Courland. He claimed descent from Issachar Berman ben Naphtali ha-Kohen, the Bartenura, and Ḥayyim Vital Calabrese. After studying for seven years at Prague under Jonathan Eibenschütz, Anton traveled in the East, and on his return became a convert to Christianity. He was baptized at Wolfenbüttel under the name Carl Anton on 30 January 1748. The Duke of Brunswick then appointed him professor of Hebrew at Helmstedt.

Though he occasionally reviled his former coreligionists, he also spoke well of them, even vindicating them in his book on Jewish oaths (Einleitung in die Jüdischen und Rabbinischen Rechte, dabey Insbesonderheit von einem Judeneide, Brunswick, 1756), against some of Eisenmenger's aspersions. Anton took part in the well-known dispute between Jacob Emden and Jonathan Eibenschütz, in which he defended the latter (Kurze Nachricht von dem Falschen Messias, Shabbethai Ẓebi, Wolfenbüttel, 1752; Nachlese zu Dieser Nachricht, Brunswick, 1753). He wrote a Latin tract on the legend of the Wandering Jew, entitled Commentatio Historica de Judæo Immortali in qua hæc Fabula Examinatur et Confutatur (Helmstedt, 1756); translated Abraham Jagel's catechism, Lekaḥ Tov ('Good Instruction', Brunswick, 1756); and gave a description of a rare copy of Shulḥan Arukh Even ha-Ezer, to be found in manuscript in the City Library of Hamburg. He also wrote Fabulæ Antiquitatum Ebraicarum Veterum (Brunswick, 1756) and Sammlung einiger Rabbinischer Oden nebst einer Freyen Übersetzung (Brunswick, 1753), among other works.
