= 2025 Portland Thorns FC season =

American women's soccer season

Portland Thorns FC
2025 season
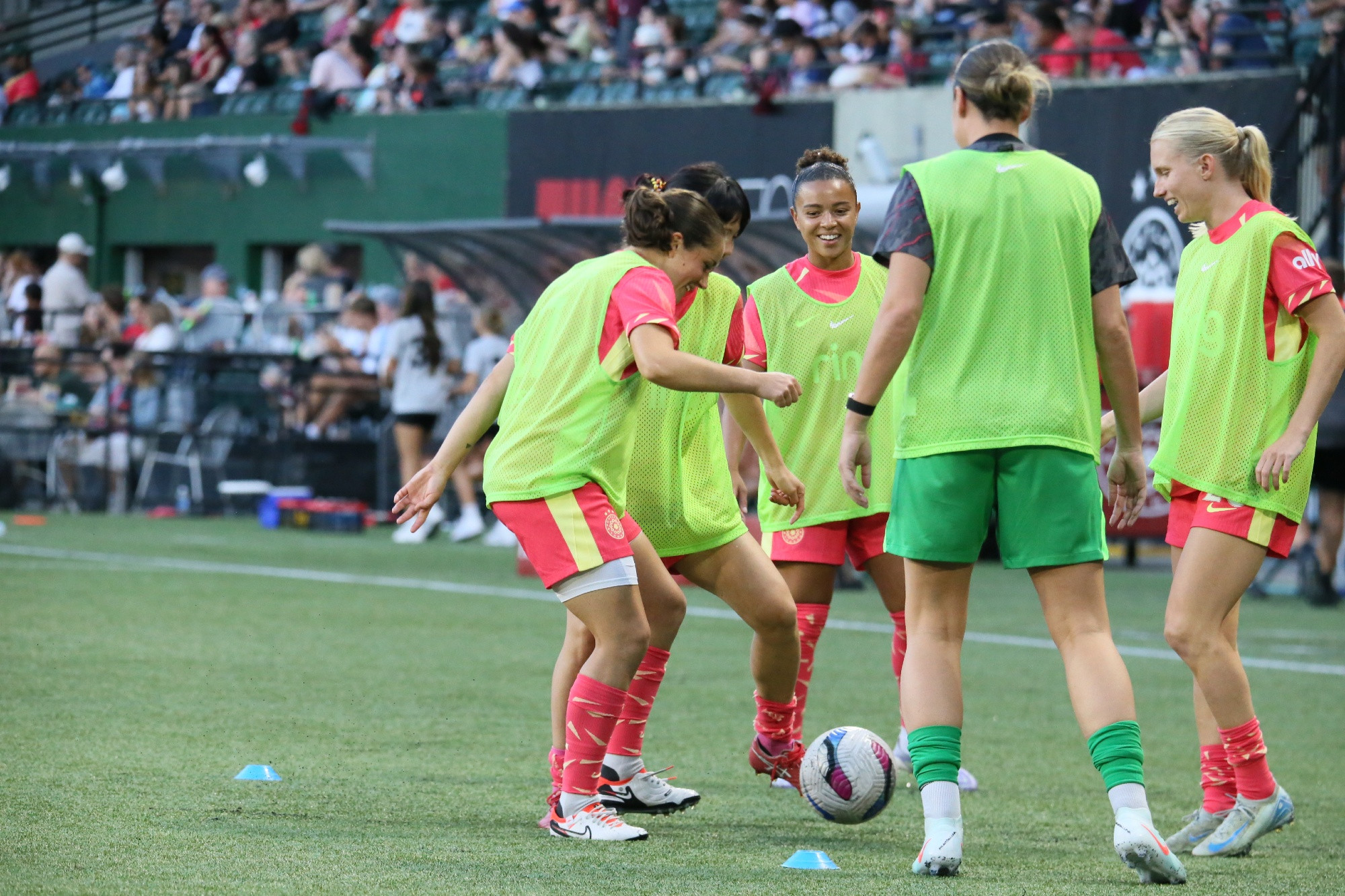
- Portland Thorns friendly vs Urawa Red Diamonds in Portland, Oregon
- Owner: RAJ Sports
- General manager: Jeff Agoos
- Head coach: Rob Gale (until Nov 25)
- Stadium: Providence Park; (capacity: 25,218)
- League: 3rd
- Playoffs: Semifinal
- CONCACAF W Champions Cup: 3rd
- Top goalscorer: Olivia Moultrie (9)
- Highest home attendance: 21,903 (vs Gotham FC, Apr 22)
- Lowest home attendance: 15,373 (vs Houston Dash, Nov 2)
- Average home league attendance: 18,173
- Biggest win: 4–1 (vs Gotham FC (H), NWSL, Apr 22); 4–1 (vs Houston Dash (A), NWSL, May 16); 3–0 (vs Club América (A), Champions Cup, May 24)
- Biggest defeat: 0–3 (vs Gotham FC (A), NWSL, Sep 26)
Home colours	Away colours
- All statistics correct as of November 15, 2025.

The 2025 Portland Thorns FC season is the team's thirteenth season as a professional women's soccer team. Thorns FC play in the National Women's Soccer League (NWSL), the top tier of women's soccer in the United States.

== Team ==
=== Staff ===
As announced during the 2024 season, General Manager Karina LeBlanc left her position at the end of 2024. On January 7, 2025, the Thorns announced the hiring of Jeff Agoos as the new President of Soccer Operations and General Manager.

Following the 2025 season, the Thorns announced the firing of head coach Rob Gale. The role remained vacant until the hiring of former Tottenham Hotspur F.C. Women manager Robert Vilahamn announced on March 4, 2026, less than two weeks before the start of the 2026 season.

As of January 21, 2025.

Technical
General manager President of Thorns FC operations	Jeff Agoos
Technical director	Mike Norris
Head coach	Rob Gale
Assistant coach	Vytautas Andriuškevičius
Assistant coach	Sarah Lowdon
Assistant coach	Stephen Hart
Goalkeeper coach	Jordan Franken
Medical
Head athletic trainer	Matt Hunter
Director of scouting and recruiting Youth sporting director	Mike Smith
Sports scientist	Ella Maliska
Performance and wellness coach	Renee Pirkl

=== Squad ===
As of September 30, 2025.

No.	Nat.	Name	Date of birth (age)	Since	Previous team	Notes (Note: denotes a season-ending injury.)
Goalkeepers
1	(United States)	Bella Bixby	November 20, 1995 (age 30)	2018	(United States) Oregon State	
18	(Australia)	Mackenzie Arnold (Vice-Captain)	February 25, 1994 (age 32)	2024	(England) West Ham United	INT
35	(United States)	Morgan Messner	February 17, 2000 (age 26)	2025	(United States) San Diego Wave	
Defenders
2	(Mexico)	Reyna Reyes	February 16, 2001 (age 25)	2024	(United States) Alabama Crimson Tide	
5	(Denmark)	Isabella Obaze	October 30, 2002 (age 23)	2024	(Sweden) FC Rosengård	INT
11	(Nigeria)	Nicole Payne	January 18, 2001 (age 25)	2024	(France) Paris Saint-Germain	
16	(United States)	Sam Hiatt	January 6, 1998 (age 28)	2025	(United States) Gotham FC	
20	(Australia)	Kaitlyn Torpey	March 17, 2000 (age 26)	2025	(United States) San Diego Wave	INT
23	(Germany)	Marie Müller	July 25, 2000 (age 26)	2024	(Germany) SC Freiburg	
24	(United States)	Jayden Perry	February 20, 2001 (age 25)	2025	(United States) UCLA Bruins	
25	(United States)	M.A. Vignola	February 11, 1998 (age 28)	2025	(United States) Angel City	
29	(United States)	Mallie McKenzie	November 13, 2000 (age 25)	2024	(United States) Georgia Bulldogs	
34	(Brazil)	Daiane	September 7, 1997 (age 29)	2025	(Brazil) Flamengo	INT
Midfielders
4	(England)	Laila Harbert	January 3, 2007 (age 19)	2024	(England) Arsenal	LOAN
13	(United States)	Olivia Moultrie	September 17, 2005 (age 20)	2021	Portland Thorns Academy	
17	(United States)	Sam Coffey (Captain)	December 31, 1998 (age 27)	2021	(United States) Penn State	
21	(Canada)	Jessie Fleming	March 11, 1998 (age 28)	2024	(England) Chelsea	INT
33	(United States)	Naomi Powell	January 10, 1999 (age 27)	2025	(Scotland) Heart of Midlothian	
54	(United States)	Olivia Wade-Katoa	December 28, 1999 (age 26)	2024	(United States) BYU Cougars	PREG (Note: Wade-Katoa announced she is expecting her first child on 22 March 2025.)
Forwards
7	(United States)	Caiya Hanks	September 26, 2004 (age 21)	2025	(United States) Wake Forest	
9	(United States)	Sophia Wilson	August 10, 2000 (age 26)	2020	(United States) Stanford	PREG (Note: Wilson announced she is expecting her first child on 5 March 2025.)
10	(Venezuela)	Deyna Castellanos	April 18, 1999 (age 27)	2025	(United States) Bay FC	
15	(United States)	Payton Linnehan	March 25, 2001 (age 25)	2024	(United States) Penn State	
19	(United States)	Pietra Tordin	March 30, 2004 (age 22)	2025	(United States) Princeton Tigers	
22	(United States)	Morgan Weaver	October 18, 1997 (age 28)	2020	(United States) Washington State	
26	(Canada)	Mimi Alidou	April 28, 1995 (age 31)	2025	(Portugal) Benfica	INT
27	(France)	Julie Dufour	May 29, 2001 (age 25)	2025	(United States) Angel City	INT
66	(United States)	Reilyn Turner	October 18, 2002 (age 23)	2024	(United States) Racing Louisville	
77	(United States)	Alexa Spaanstra	February 1, 2000 (age 26)	2024	(United States) Kansas City Current	
88	(Colombia)	Valerin Loboa	July 3, 2007 (age 19)	2025	(Colombia) Deportivo Cali	INT

== Pre-season ==
=== Coachella Valley Invitational ===
February 16	Angel City	2–1	Portland Thorns	Indio, California
11:00 am PST	Nabet 67'; Antonucci 90+3'	Report	Linnehan 57'	Stadium: Empire Polo Club

February 22	Houston Dash	3–2	Portland Thorns	Indio, California
10:00 am PST	Gareis; Bright		Turner; Detrizio	Stadium: Empire Polo Club

=== Friendly ===
March 7	Portland Thorns	0–1	Utah Royals	Portland, Oregon
7:00 pm PST		Report	Sentnor 20'	Stadium: Providence Park

== Competitions ==
Win Draw Loss

=== Regular season ===
Pos	Team	Pld	W	D	L	GF	GA	GD	Pts	Qualification
1	Kansas City Current (S)	26	21	2	3	49	13	+36	65	Playoffs and CONCACAF W Champions Cup
2	Washington Spirit	26	12	8	6	42	33	+9	44	Playoffs and CONCACAF W Champions Cup
3	Portland Thorns FC	26	11	7	8	36	29	+7	40	Playoffs
4	Orlando Pride	26	11	7	8	33	27	+6	40	Playoffs
5	Seattle Reign FC	26	10	9	7	32	29	+3	39	Playoffs

Source: NWSL
Rules for classification: 1) points; 2) total goal difference; 3) total wins; 4) total goals scored; 5) head-to-head points; 6) head-to-head goals scored; 7) fewest disciplinary points; 8) coin toss (if 2 clubs tied) or drawing of lots (if ≥3 clubs tied).
(S) NWSL Shield

==== Results summary ====
Overall								Home						Away					
Pld	W	D	L	GF	GA	GD	Pts	W	D	L	GF	GA	GD	W	D	L	GF	GA	GD
26	11	7	8	36	29	+7	40	7	4	2	22	13	+9	4	3	6	14	16	−2

Last updated: November 2, 2025.
Source: NWSLsoccer.com

==== Results by matchday ====
Matchday	1	2	3	4	5	6	7	8	9	10	11	12	13	14	15	16	17	18	19	20	21	22	23	24	25	26
Ground	A	H	H	A	A	H	H	H	A	A	A	H	H	A	H	A	H	H	A	A	H	A	H	A	A	H
Result	L	D	D	W	L	W	D	W	D	W	L	W	W	L	W	D	L	L	W	D	D	L	W	L	W	W
Position	13	11	11	6	9	6	6	5	6	4	7	5	5	6	5	5	5	6	4	4	4	6	4	7	6	3

Updated to match(es) played on November 2, 2025. Source: NWSLsoccer.com
A = Away; H = Home; W = Win; D = Draw; L = Loss; P = Postponed

==== Matches ====
March 15 1	Kansas City Current	3–1	Portland Thorns	Kansas City, Missouri
11:45 am CDT	Chawinga 2'; Hutton (yellow card) 12'; Cooper 22'; Debinha 35'	Report	Reyes (yellow card) 17'; Moultrie 48'; Sugita (yellow card) 50'	Stadium: CPKC Stadium; Attendance: 11,500; Referee: Alyssa Nichols

March 21 2	Portland Thorns	1–1	Angel City	Portland, Oregon
7:00 pm PDT	Turner 30'; Torpey (yellow card) 69'	Report	Fuller 9'; King (yellow card) 90+1'	Stadium: Providence Park; Attendance: 15,839; Referee: Greg Dopka

March 29 3	Portland Thorns	0–0	North Carolina Courage	Portland, Oregon
7:00 pm PDT	Castellanos (yellow card) 51'	Report	Shaw (penalty missed) 76'	Stadium: Providence Park; Attendance: 15,967; Referee: Elton García

April 11 4	Utah Royals	0–1	Portland Thorns	Sandy, Utah
8:00 pm MDT	Del Fava (yellow card) 62'; Foederer (yellow card) 62'	Report	Hanks (yellow card) 10'; Turner 14'	Stadium: America First Field; Attendance: 5,051; Referee: Iryna Petrunok

April 18 5	Seattle Reign	1–0	Portland Thorns	Seattle, Washington
7:00 pm PDT	Dahlien 4'	Report	Reyes (yellow card) 17'; Torpey (yellow card) 45+1'; Perry (yellow card) 77'	Stadium: Lumen Field; Attendance: 7,609; Referee: Jeremy Scheer

April 22 6	Portland Thorns	4–1	Gotham FC	Portland, Oregon
7:30 pm PDT	Alidou 7'; Reyes (yellow card) 53'; Hanks 61'; Perry 73' (pen.); Castellanos 80'	Report	González 8'; Torres (yellow card) 51'	Stadium: Providence Park; Attendance: 15,373; Referee: John Griggs

April 27 7	Portland Thorns	3–3	Racing Louisville	Portland, Oregon
1:00 pm PDT	Turner 17'; Fleming 45+5' (pen.); Reyes (yellow card) 90+5'; Perry 90+10' (pen.)	Report	DeMelo 9'; Fischer 32'; Sears 39'	Stadium: Providence Park; Attendance: 16,219; Referee: Corbyn May

May 3 8	Portland Thorns	1–0	Orlando Pride	Portland, Oregon
4:30pm PDT	Reyes 16'; Hiatt (yellow card) 78'	Report	Lemos (yellow card) 42'	Stadium: Providence Park; Attendance: 17,776; Referee: Nabil Bensalah

May 10 9	San Diego Wave	1–1	Portland Thorns	San Diego, California
7:00 pm PDT	Ascanio 6'; Wesley (red card) 41'	Report	Perry 90+8' (pen.)	Stadium: Snapdragon Stadium; Attendance: 10,433; Referee: Natalie Simon

May 16 10	Houston Dash	1–4	Portland Thorns	Houston, Texas
12:00 pm CDT	Hiatt 75' (o.g.)	Report	Tordin 26'; Linnehan 30'; Coffey 45+8' (pen.); Hanks 54'	Stadium: Shell Energy Stadium; Attendance: 6,217; Referee: Shawn Tehini

June 7 11	Bay FC	1–0	Portland Thorns	San Jose, California
4:30 pm PDT	Oshoala (yellow card) 33'; Malonson 39'; Pickett (yellow card) 80'	Report		Stadium: PayPal Park; Attendance: 14,094; Referee: Matthew Corrigan

June 15 12	Portland Thorns	2–0	Washington Spirit	Portland, Oregon
1:00 pm PDT	Turner 39'; Tordin 82'; Coffey (yellow card) 87'	Report	Hershfelt (yellow card) 38'; Miura (yellow card) 73'	Stadium: Providence Park; Attendance: 21,268; Referee: Joshua Encarnación

June 21 13	Portland Thorns	1–0	Chicago Stars	Portland, Oregon
7:00 pm PDT	Tordin 59'	Report		Stadium: Providence Park; Attendance: 17,779; Referee: Iryna Petrunok

August 3 14	Washington Spirit	2–1	Portland Thorns	Washington D.C.
12:30 EDT	Bethune (yellow card) 11'; Monday 17'; Morgan (yellow card) 42'; Rodman 90+2'	Report	Torpey (yellow card) 19'; Moultrie 45+3'	Stadium: Audi Field; Attendance: 16,007; Referee: Brad Jensen

August 10 15	Portland Thorns	4–2	Seattle Reign	Portland, Oregon
1:00 pm PDT	Coffey 18'; Turner 26'; Reyes 55'; Tordin 65'	Report	Adames 3'; Fishlock 64'	Stadium: Providence Park; Attendance: 21,811; Referee: Katja Koroleva

August 16 16	North Carolina Courage	1–1	Portland Thorns	Cary, North Carolina
7:30 pm EDT	Lussi (yellow card) 26' (goal) 70'	Report	Moultrie 44'; Tordin (yellow card) 79'	Stadium: WakeMed Soccer Park; Attendance: 7,122; Referee: Natalie Simon

August 23 17	Portland Thorns	0–2	Kansas City Current	Portland, Oregon
7:00 pm PDT	Castellanos (yellow card) 56'; Hiatt (yellow card) 90+11'	Report	Wheeler 1'; Chawinga 71'; Robinson (red card)	Stadium: Providence Park; Attendance: 16,695; Referee: Alexandra Billeter

August 29 18	Portland Thorns	1–2	Utah Royals	Portland, Oregon
7:30 pm PDT	Turner (yellow card) 52'; Sugita (yellow card) 68'; Dufour 90+7'	Report	Monaghan 22' (yellow card) 79'; St-Georges (yellow card) 75'; Ream 85'	Stadium: Providence Park; Attendance: 16,066; Referee: Trevor Wiseman

September 5 19	Racing Louisville	1–2	Portland Thorns	Louisville, Kentucky
8:00pm EDT	O'Kane 22'; Demelo (yellow card) 90+4'	Report	Dufour 31' (yellow card) 36'; Coffey (penalty missed) 49'; Perry (yellow card) 75'; Alidou (yellow card) 88'; Jean 90' (o.g.)	Stadium: Lynn Family Stadium; Attendance: 6,102; Referee: Gerald Flores

September 14 20	Chicago Stars	1–1	Portland Thorns	Bridgeview, Illinois
2:00 pm CDT	Franklin 45' (yellow card) 67'	Report	Moultrie 12'; Fleming (yellow card) 45+6'	Stadium: SeatGeek Stadium; Attendance: 3,751; Referee: Servando Berna Rico

September 20 21	Portland Thorns	1–1	San Diego Wave	Portland, Oregon
7:00 pm PDT	Turner (yellow card) 38'; Reyes 86'	Report	Corley (yellow card) 6'; McCaskill (yellow card) 32' (goal) 56'; Leon (yellow card) 49'; Armstrong (yellow card) 85'; Morroni (yellow card) 90+1'	Stadium: Providence Park; Attendance: 18,443; Referee: Nabil Bensalah

September 26 22	Gotham FC	3–0	Portland Thorns	Harrison, New Jersey
8:00 pm EDT	Purce 10'; Lavelle 43'; Stengel 73'	Report	Moultrie (yellow card) 90+1'	Stadium: Red Bull Arena; Attendance: 8,522; Referee: Alyssa Nichols

October 4 23	Portland Thorns	2–1	Bay FC	Portland, Oregon
7:00 pm PDT	Moultrie 51', 69'	Report	Huff 36'; Hocking (yellow card) 68'	Stadium: Providence Park; Attendance: 21,104; Referee: Thomas Snyder

October 10 24	Orlando Pride	1–0	Portland Thorns	Orlando, Florida
8:00 pm EDT	McKenzie 90+2' (o.g.)	Report	Tordin (yellow card) 37'; Coffey (yellow card) 61'; McKenzie (yellow card) 85'	Stadium: Inter&Co Stadium; Attendance: 7,070; Referee: Shawn Tehini

October 19 25	Angel City	0–2	Portland Thorns	Los Angeles, California
2:00 pm PDT	Niehues (yellow card) 72'	Report	Moultrie 23', 60' (pen.); Coffey (yellow card) 47'	Stadium: BMO Stadium; Attendance: 19,841; Referee: Jaclyn Metz

November 2 26	Portland Thorns	2–0	Houston Dash	Portland, Oregon
2:15 pm PT	Castellanos 3'; Fleming 35'	Report	Colaprico (yellow card) 70'	Stadium: Providence Park; Attendance: 21,903; Referee: Matt Thompson

=== Playoffs ===
Quarterfinals
1	Kansas City Current	1
8	Gotham FC (a.e.t.)	2
4	Orlando Pride	2
5	Seattle Reign FC	0
2	Washington Spirit (p)	1 (3)
7	Racing Louisville FC	1 (1)
3	Portland Thorns FC (a.e.t.)	1
6	San Diego Wave FC	0

Semifinals
8	Gotham FC	1
4	Orlando Pride	0
2	Washington Spirit	2
3	Portland Thorns FC	0

Championship
8	Gotham FC	1
2	Washington Spirit	0

November 9 Quarterfinals	Portland Thorns	1–0 (a.e.t.)	San Diego Wave	Portland, Oregon
12:00 pm PT	Torpey (yellow card) 45'; Moultrie (yellow card) 90+10'; Turner 94'	Report	Morroni (yellow card) 48'; Leon (yellow card) 120+3'	Stadium: Providence Park; Attendance: 19,309; Referee: Thomas Snyder

November 15 Semifinals	Washington Spirit	2–0	Portland Thorns	Washington, D.C.
12:00 pm EST	Monday 27'; Bethune 83'	Report		Stadium: Audi Field; Attendance: 19,365; Referee: Brad Jensen

=== 2024–25 CONCACAF W Champions Cup ===
Pos	Team	Pld	W	D	L	GF	GA	GD	Pts	Qualification	AME	POR	SDW	WFC	SFE
1	(Mexico) América	4	3	0	1	14	3	+11	9	Advance to knockout stage	—	—	—	7–0	5–0
2	(United States) Portland Thorns	4	3	0	1	13	5	+8	9	Advance to knockout stage	3–1	—	—	—	2–1
3	(United States) San Diego Wave	4	3	0	1	7	3	+4	9		0–1	3–2	—	—	—
4	(Canada) Whitecaps Girls Elite	4	1	0	3	2	16	−14	3		—	0–6	0–2	—	—
5	(Panama) Santa Fe	4	0	0	4	2	11	−9	0		—	—	0–2	1–2	—

Source: CONCACAF
Rules for classification: Tiebreakers

==== Group stage ====
September 4, 2024	Portland Thorns (United States)	3–1	(Mexico) Club América Femenil	Portland, Oregon
7:00 pm PDT	Sinclair 13', 28'; Moultrie (yellow card) 45'; Turner 52'	Report	Guerrero 53'	Stadium: Providence Park; Referee: Myriam Marcotte (Canada)

September 18, 2024	San Diego Wave (United States)	3–2	(United States) Portland Thorns	San Diego, California
7:00 pm PDT	Sánchez 67' (pen.), 69', 85' (pen.)	Report	Smith 25'; Turner 54'	Stadium: Snapdragon Stadium; Referee: Merlin Soto (Honduras)

October 1, 2024	Portland Thorns (United States)	2–1	(Panama) Santa Fé FC	Portland, Oregon
7:30 pm PDT	D'Aquila 10' (pen.); Linnehan 64'	Report	Márquez 82'	Stadium: Providence Park; Referee: Carly Shaw-MacLaren (Canada)

October 15, 2024	Whitecaps FC Girls Elite (Canada)	0–6	(United States) Portland Thorns	Vancouver, Canada
7:00pm PDT		Report	D'Aquila 22', 38'; Linnehan 54'; Spaanstra 58'; Sinclair 85'; Reyes 90+5'	Stadium: BC Place; Referee: Francia González (Mexico)

==== Semifinals ====
May 21, 2025	UANL (Mexico)	2–0	(United States) Portland Thorns	Nuevo León, Mexico
9:30 pm ET	Farmer 10'; Kgatlana 27'; Losa (yellow card) 36'; Kgatlana (yellow card) 45'; Rangel (yellow card) 85'	Report	Perry (yellow card) 90+7'	Stadium: Estadio Universitario; Referee: Carly Shaw-MacLaren (Canada)

==== Third Place play-off ====
May 24, 2025	Portland Thorns (United States)	3–0	(Mexico) Club América	Nuevo León, Mexico
7:00 pm ET	Tordin 45'; Linnehan 52'; Messner (yellow card) 57'; Moultrie 81'	Report	Guerrero (yellow card) 48'	Stadium: Estadio Universitario; Referee: Astrid Gramajo (Guatemala)

== Statistics ==
Statistics as of November 15, 2025.

=== Appearances ===
No	Pos	Nat	Player	NWSL Regular Season		NWSL Playoffs		Champions Cup		Total	
No	Pos	Nat	Player	Apps	Goals	Apps	Goals	Apps	Goals	Apps	Goals
Goalkeepers
1	GK	(United States)	Bella Bixby	7	0	0	0	1	0	8	0
18	GK	(Australia)	Mackenzie Arnold	19	0	2	0	0	0	21	0
30	GK	(United States)	Haley Craig	0	0	0	0	0	0	0	0
35	GK	(United States)	Morgan Messner	0	0	0	0	1	0	1	0
Defenders
2	DF	(Mexico)	Reyna Reyes	25+1	3	2	0	1+1	0	28+2	3
5	DF	(Denmark)	Isabella Obaze	21	0	2	0	1	0	24	0
16	DF	(United States)	Sam Hiatt	20+1	0	2	0	2	0	24+1	0
20	DF	(Australia)	Kaitlyn Torpey	13+5	0	2	0	1+1	0	16+6	0
24	DF	(United States)	Jayden Perry	14+4	3	0+1	0	1+1	0	15+6	3
25	DF	(United States)	M.A. Vignola	2+1	0	0	0	0	0	2+1	0
29	DF	(United States)	Mallie McKenzie	8+15	0	0+2	0	1	0	9+17	0
34	DF	(Brazil)	Daiane	1+6	0	0+2	0	0	0	1+8	0
Midfielders
4	MF	(England)	Laila Harbert	0+4	0	0+1	0	0	0	0+5	0
13	MF	(United States)	Olivia Moultrie	24+2	8	2	0	1+1	1	27+3	9
17	MF	(United States)	Sam Coffey	25	2	2	0	1+1	0	28+1	2
21	MF	(Canada)	Jessie Fleming	19+6	2	2	0	0+1	0	21+7	2
33	MF	(United States)	Naomi Powell	0	0	0	0	0	0	0	0
Forwards
10	FW	(Venezuela)	Deyna Castellanos	13+8	2	2	0	1	0	16+8	2
19	FW	(United States)	Pietra Tordin	9+15	4	0+2	0	1+1	1	10+18	5
26	FW	(Canada)	Mimi Alidou	6+14	1	0	0	1+1	0	7+15	1
27	FW	(France)	Julie Dufour	3+2	2	0	0	0	0	3+2	2
66	FW	(United States)	Reilyn Turner	22+3	5	2	1	1	0	25+3	7
77	FW	(United States)	Alexa Spaanstra	5+11	0	2	0	1+1	0	8+12	0
88	FW	(Colombia)	Valerin Loboa	0+2	0	0	0	0	0	0+2	0
Other players (Departed during season, SEI, maternity leave etc.)
7	FW	(United States)	Caiya Hanks	7+4	2	0	0	1+1	0	8+5	2
8	MF	(Japan)	Hina Sugita	18+4	0	0	0	1	0	19+4	0
9	FW	(United States)	Sophia Wilson	0	0	0	0	0	0	0	0
11	DF	(Nigeria)	Nicole Payne	0	0	0	0	0	0	0	0
14	MF	(United States)	Sophie Hirst	0+3	0	0	0	1	0	1+3	0
15	FW	(United States)	Payton Linnehan	4+9	1	0	0	1+1	1	5+10	2
22	FW	(United States)	Morgan Weaver	0	0	0	0	0	0	0	0
23	DF	(Germany)	Marie Müller	0	0	0	0	0	0	0	0
28	MF	(United States)	Carissa Boeckmann	0	0	0	0	1	0	1	0
46	DF	(United States)	Moira Kelley	0	0	0	0	1	0	1	0
54	MF	(United States)	Olivia Wade-Katoa	0	0	0	0	0	0	0	0

=== Goals ===
Rank	No.	Pos.	Nat.	Name	NWSL	Playoffs	Champions Cup	Total
1	13	MF	(United States)	Olivia Moultrie	8	0	1	9
2	66	FW	(United States)	Reilyn Turner	5	1	0	6
3	19	FW	(United States)	Pietra Tordin	4	0	1	5
4	2	DF	(Mexico)	Reyna Reyes	3	0	0	3
4	24	DF	(United States)	Jayden Perry	3	0	0	3
6	7	FW	(United States)	Caiya Hanks	2	0	0	2
6	10	FW	(Colombia)	Deyna Castellanos	2	0	0	2
6	15	FW	(United States)	Payton Linnehan	1	0	1	2
6	17	MF	(United States)	Sam Coffey	2	0	0	2
6	21	MF	(Canada)	Jessie Fleming	2	0	0	2
6	27	FW	(France)	Julie Dufour	2	0	0	2
12	26	FW	(Canada)	Mimi Alidou	1	0	0	1
Own goals					1	0	0	1
Total					36	1	3	40

=== Shutouts ===
Rank	No.	Nat.	Name	NWSL	Playoffs	Champions Cup	Total
1	18	(Australia)	Mackenzie Arnold	4	1	0	5
2	1	(United States)	Bella Bixby	3	0	0	3
3	35	(United States)	Morgan Messner	0	0	1	1
Total				7	1	1	9

=== Disciplinary record ===
Rank	No.	Pos.	Nat.	Name	NWSL			Playoffs			Champions Cup			Total		
Rank	No.	Pos.	Nat.	Name	Booked	(yellow card) (yellow-red card)	Sent off (straight red)	Booked	(yellow card) (yellow-red card)	Sent off (straight red)	Booked	(yellow card) (yellow-red card)	Sent off (straight red)	Booked	(yellow card) (yellow-red card)	Sent off (straight red)
1	2	DF	(Mexico)	Reyna Reyes	4	0	0	0	0	0	0	0	0	4	0	0
1	20	DF	(Australia)	Kaitlyn Torpey	3	0	0	1	0	0	0	0	0	4	0	0
3	17	MF	(United States)	Sam Coffey	3	0	0	0	0	0	0	0	0	3	0	0
4	8	MF	(Japan)	Hina Sugita	2	0	0	0	0	0	0	0	0	2	0	0
4	10	FW	(Venezuela)	Deyna Castellanos	2	0	0	0	0	0	0	0	0	2	0	0
4	13	MF	(United States)	Olivia Moultrie	1	0	0	1	0	0	0	0	0	2	0	0
4	16	DF	(United States)	Sam Hiatt	2	0	0	0	0	0	0	0	0	2	0	0
4	19	FW	(United States)	Pietra Tordin	2	0	0	0	0	0	0	0	0	2	0	0
4	21	MF	(Canada)	Jessie Fleming	1	0	0	1	0	0	0	0	0	2	0	0
4	24	DF	(United States)	Jayden Perry	2	0	0	0	0	0	1	0	0	3	0	0
4	66	FW	(United States)	Reilyn Turner	2	0	0	0	0	0	0	0	0	2	0	0
12	7	FW	(United States)	Caiya Hanks	1	0	0	0	0	0	0	0	0	1	0	0
12	26	FW	(Canada)	Mimi Alidou	1	0	0	0	0	0	0	0	0	1	0	0
12	27	FW	(France)	Julie Dufour	1	0	0	0	0	0	0	0	0	1	0	0
12	29	DF	(United States)	Mallie McKenzie	1	0	0	0	0	0	0	0	0	1	0	0
12	35	GK	(United States)	Morgan Messner	0	0	0	0	0	0	1	0	0	1	0	0
Total					28	0	0	2	0	0	2	0	0	32	0	0

== Transactions ==
=== Contract extensions ===
Date	Player	Pos.	Notes	Ref.
December 10, 2024	(United States) Sophie Hirst	MF	Signed a two-year contract extension through 2026.	
December 10, 2024	(United States) Mallie McKenzie	DF	Signed a one-year contract extension through 2025.	
December 23, 2024	(United States) Bella Bixby	GK	Signed a one-year contract extension with a mutual option.	
May 15, 2025	(United States) Jayden Perry	DF	Signed a multi-year contract extension through 2028.	
June 16, 2025	(United States) Morgan Messner	GK	Signed a one-year contract extension through 2026.	
June 21, 2025	(United States) Bella Bixby	GK	Mutual offer for 2026 season agreed upon and triggered.	
June 24, 2025	(Germany) Marie Müller	DF	Signed a one-year contract extension through 2026 with a mutual option.	
July 14, 2025	(United States) Mallie McKenzie	DF	Signed a one-year contract extension through 2026.	
August 23, 2025	(United States) Naomi Powell	MF	Signed a contract extension through 2025.	
September 22, 2025	(Mexico) Reyna Reyes	DF	Signed a five-year contract extension through 2030.	
October 7, 2025	(United States) M.A. Vignola	DF	Signed a two-year contract extension through 2027 with a mutual option.	
October 16, 2025	(United States) Reilyn Turner	FW	Signed a multi-year contract extension through 2028 with a mutual option.	
November 4, 2025	(United States) Olivia Moultrie	MF	Signed a four-year contract extension through 2029.	

=== Transfers in ===
Date	Player	Pos.	Previous club	Fee/notes	Ref.
December 6, 2024	(United States) Sam Hiatt	DF	(United States) Gotham FC	Free agent signed to a two-year contract through 2026 with a mutual option.	
December 16, 2024	(Brazil) Daiane	DF	(Brazil) Flamengo	Acquired in exchange for an undisclosed transfer fee.	
January 8, 2025	(United States) Pietra Tordin	FW	(United States) Princeton Tigers	Signed a two-year contract through 2026 with a mutual option.	
January 22, 2025	(United States) Jayden Perry	DF	(United States) UCLA Bruins	Signed a one-year contract through 2025.	
February 17, 2025	(Venezuela) Deyna Castellanos	FW	(United States) Bay FC	Free agent signed to a two-year contract through 2026 with a mutual option.	
February 17, 2025	(United States) Carissa Boeckmann	MF	(United States) Florida State Seminoles	Signed a one-year contract through 2025.	
March 4, 2025	(United States) Morgan Messner	GK	(United States) San Diego Wave FC	Free agent signed to a one-year contract through 2025.	
March 5, 2025	(Australia) Kaitlyn Torpey	DF	(United States) San Diego Wave FC	Acquired in exchange for either $10,000 in intra-league transfer funds or $15,000 in allocation money, pending conditions met.	
March 12, 2025	(United States) Caiya Hanks	FW	(United States) Wake Forest	Signed a four year contract through 2028 with a mutual option.	
March 14, 2025	(United States) Moira Kelley	DF	(United States) Virginia Cavaliers	Preseason non-roster invitee signed to a short-term contract through June 2025.	
March 14, 2025	(Canada) Mimi Alidou	FW	(Portugal) Benfica	Signed to a two-year contract through 2026 with a mutual option for an undisclosed fee.	
May 19, 2025	(United States) Haley Craig	GK	(United States) Stanford	Signed a roster relief contract through June 2025.	
July 23, 2025	(United States) Naomi Powell	MF	(Scotland) Heart of Midlothian	Signed a short-term contract through August 2025.	
August 23, 2025	(France) Julie Dufour	FW	(United States) Angel City	Acquired in exchange for $40,000 in intra-league transfer funds. Signed a two-year contract through 2027.	
September 3, 2025	(Colombia) Valerin Loboa	FW	(Colombia) Deportivo Cali	Signed to a three-year contract through 2028 with a mutual option for an undisclosed fee.	
September 30, 2025	(United States) M.A. Vignola	DF	(United States) Angel City	Acquired in exchange for midfielder Hina Sugita and $600,000 intra-league transfer funds.	

=== Loans in ===
Date	Player	Pos.	From club	Fee/notes	Ref.
August 25, 2025	(England) Laila Harbert	MF	(England) Arsenal	Loaned until end of season.	

=== Transfers out ===
Date	Player	Pos.	Destination club	Fee/notes	Ref.
December 11, 2024	(United States) Izzy D'Aquila	FW	(Sweden) Malmö FF	Mutual contract termination.	
December 11, 2024	(Republic of Ireland) Marissa Sheva	MF	(England) Sunderland	Out of contract.	
December 11, 2024	(United States) Lauren Kozal	GK	(Switzerland) GC Zurich	Out of contract.	
December 11, 2024	(United States) Gabby Provenzano	MF	(United States) Tampa Bay	Out of contract.	
December 11, 2024	(United States) Kat Asman	GK	(United States) Orlando Pride	Out of contract.	
December 11, 2024	(United States) Kelli Hubly	DF	(United States) Bay FC	Out of contract.	
December 31, 2024	(United States) Shelby Hogan	GK	(United States) Gotham FC	Traded in exchange for $10,000 in intra-league transfer fees and a 2025 international roster spot.	
July 12, 2025	(United States) Moira Kelley	DF	(Sweden) Linköping	End of contract.	
August 30, 2025	(United States) Payton Linnehan	FW	(United States) North Carolina Courage	Traded in exchange for $48,000 in intra-league transfer fees.	
September 6, 2025	(United States) Carissa Boeckmann	MF	(Portugal) Benfica	Traded in exchange for an undisclosed transfer fees.	
September 30, 2025	(Japan) Hina Sugita	MF	(United States) Angel City	Traded in exchange for in exchange for midfielder M.A. Vignola and $600,000 intra-league transfer funds.	

=== Retirements ===
Date	Player	Pos.	Ref.
December 17, 2024	(United States) Becky Sauerbrunn	DF	
December 11, 2024	(United States) Meghan Klingenberg	DF	
July 30, 2025	(United States) Sophie Hirst	MF	

=== Injury listings ===
Date	Player	Pos.	List	Injury	Ref.
February 26, 2025	(United States) Morgan Weaver	FW	Season-ending injury	Right knee injury sustained in January 2025.	
February 26, 2025	(Nigeria) Nicole Payne	DF	Season-ending injury	Sustained a right knee anterior cruciate ligament tear in the Coachella Valley Invitational match against Angel City FC on February 16.	
February 26, 2025	(Germany) Marie Müller	DF	Season-ending injury	Right knee anterior cruciate ligament tear sustained on duty with the German Women's National Team on February 19.	
June 20, 2025	(United States) Caiya Hanks	FW	Season-ending injury	Sustained a left knee anterior cruciate ligament tear during the game against Washington Spirit on June 15.	
September 25, 2025	(France) Julie Dufour	FW	Season-ending injury	Left knee anterior cruciate ligament sustained during the match against San Diego Wave on September 20.	
