= Sophie Hirst =

American soccer player (born 2000)

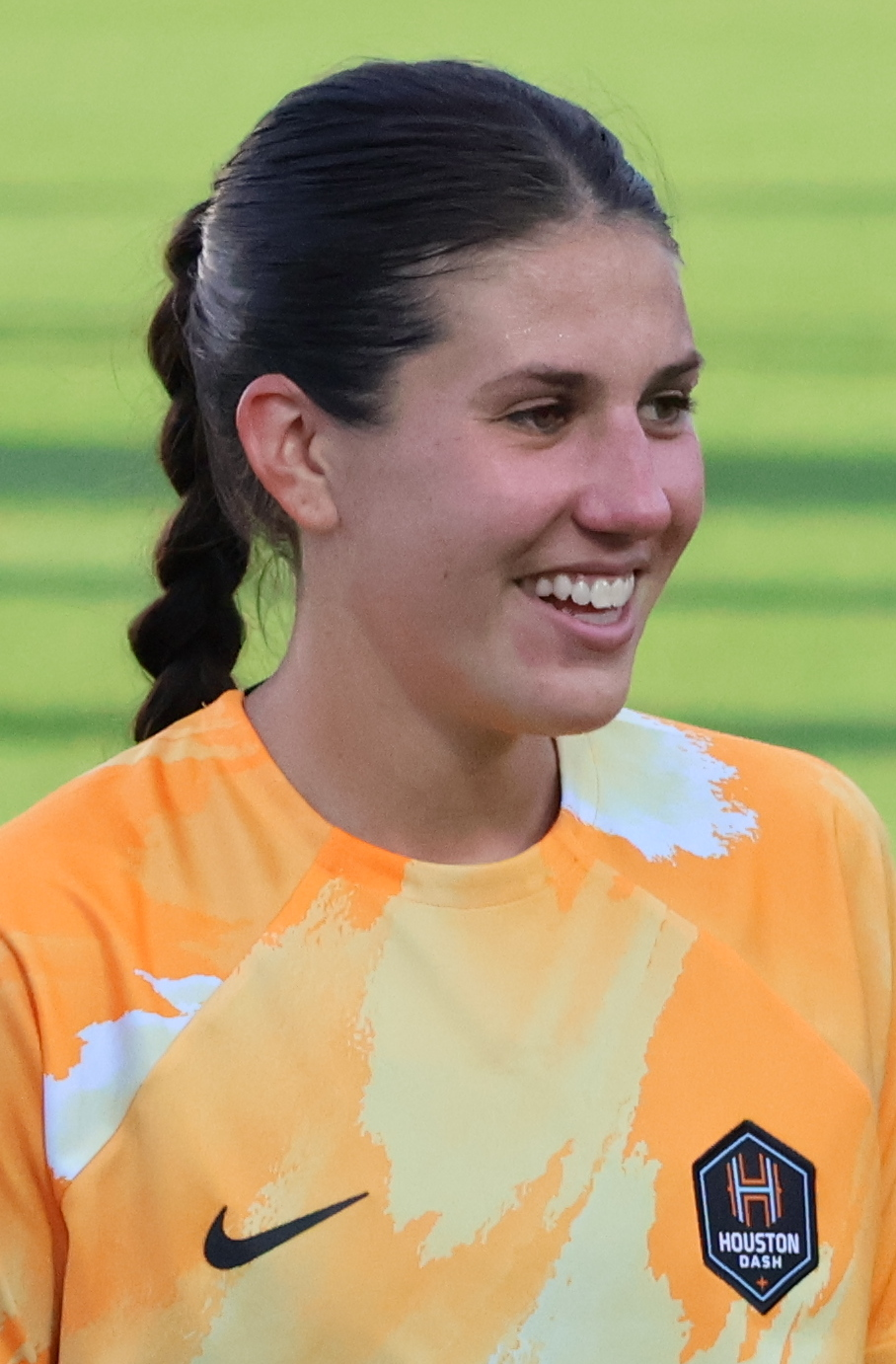
- Hirst with the Houston Dash in 2024

Personal information
- Date of birth: February 25, 2000 (age 26)
- Place of birth: Seattle, Washington, U.S.
- Height: 5 ft 8 in (1.73 m)
- Position: Midfielder

Youth career
- Crossfire Premier

College career
Years	Team	Apps	(Gls)
2018–2022	Harvard Crimson	60	(10)

Senior career*
Years	Team	Apps	(Gls)
2023–2024	Houston Dash	19	(1)
2024–2025	Portland Thorns		
- * Club domestic league appearances and goals as of July 30, 2025

Sophie Hirst (born February 25, 2000) is an American former professional soccer player who played as a midfielder. She played college soccer for the Harvard Crimson before being selected 20th overall by the Houston Dash in the 2023 NWSL Draft. Hirst spent two years in the NWSL playing for the Dash and one with Portland Thorns FC.

== Early life ==
Hirst was born and raised in Seattle, Washington, where she attended Seattle Prep for high school. With Seattle Prep, Hirst played as a forward and helped the soccer team win the 2015 state championship, where she was named the MVP of the tournament. Hirst played her club soccer for Crossfire Premier SC, where she helped the team to two consecutive top-three finishes in the ECNL National Finals.

== College career ==
Hirst played for the Harvard Crimson women's soccer team from 2018 to 2022. On August 30, 2018, Hirst made her collegiate debut and scored her first goal to help Harvard beat Syracuse. In her first year with Harvard, she appeared in 11 games and started all but one, contributing 3 goals and 3 assists to the team.

As a sophomore, Hirst recorded 5 goals and 5 assists, receiving Second Team All-Ivy honors. She operated out of central midfield, helping Harvard tally 8 shutouts on the year. She was also active offensively, scoring a college-high 5 goals and 5 assists. In 2020, the season was canceled due to the COVID-19 pandemic, but Hirst returned in 2021 as a Senior and garnered 16 appearances, 14 of them starts. She was named to the All-Ivy First Team, stepping up from the Second-Team honor she earned in the prior season. In her senior season, she was also elected as the team's co-captain, sharing duties with teammate Jillian Wachira.

During her fifth and final year at Harvard, Hirst played in a career-high 17 of Harvard's games, starting in all but one. She was named to the All-Ivy First Team for the second year in a row. Hirst finished her college career with 60 games and 10 goals under her belt. She also shined academically, earning high grades throughout her Harvard career while studying neuroscience.

== Club career ==
=== Houston Dash ===
On January 12, 2023, Hirst was selected in the 2nd round of the 2023 NWSL Draft by the Houston Dash. She was the 20th overall pick and the second-ever Harvard Crimson player to be drafted into the National Women's Soccer League, behind Midge Purce in 2017. Hirst signed her first professional contract on March 25, 2023, inking a one-year deal with the Dash. She made her professional debut on May 12, 2023, starting and making a key block in a fixture against Portland Thorns FC. She notched her first professional goal three games later, scoring the opener in a 2–0 win over the Orlando Pride on June 3, 2023. In the 6th minute of the match, Orlando goalkeeper Anna Moorhouse spilled the ball from a corner kick right to the feet of Hirst, who pounced upon the opportunity and kicked the ball into the net with the outside of her foot.

While she did not score any other goals in 2023, she finished the season with 12 regular season games and 2 NWSL Challenge Cup games under her belt. Following Hirst's performance in her rookie season, the Dash decided to exercise her contract option, keeping her in Houston. During 2024, She appeared in 7 games for the Houston Dash, starting 3.

=== Portland Thorns ===
On September 2, 2024, the Dash traded Hirst to Portland Thorns FC in exchange for a conditional $10,000 in intra-league transfer funds and $25,000 in allocation money. She made her club debut two days later in a CONCACAF W Champions Cup victory over Club América. After her first season with the Thorns, she signed a contract extension with the club lasting through 2026. However, Hirst never quite made it that far; on July 30, 2025, she announced her retirement from professional soccer in order to pursue a medical degree at Columbia University. She played in a total of 23 NWSL games prior to her retirement.

== International career ==
Hirst has represented the United States at the youth international level, receiving call-ups to the under-16 squad in 2015 and 2016.

== Career statistics ==
=== Club ===
Appearances and goals by club, season and competition
Club	Season	League			Cup (Note: Includes the NWSL Challenge Cup)		Playoffs (Note: Includes NWSL playoffs)		Continental (Note: Includes the CONCACAF W Champions Cup)		Other		Total	
Club	Season	Division	Apps	Goals	Apps	Goals	Apps	Goals	Apps	Goals	Apps	Goals	Apps	Goals
Houston Dash	2023	NWSL	12	1	2	0	—		—		—		14	1
Houston Dash	2024	NWSL	7	0	—		—		—		2 (Note: Appearances in the NWSL x Liga MX Femenil Summer Cup)	0	9	0
Houston Dash	Total		19	1	2	0	0	0	0	0	2	0	23	1
Portland Thorns FC	2024	NWSL	1	0	—		0	0	4	0	0	0	5	0
Portland Thorns FC	2025	NWSL	3	0	—		—		1	0	—		5	0
Portland Thorns FC	Total		4	0	0	0	0	0	5	0	0	0	9	0
Career total			23	1	2	0	0	0	5	0	2	0	32	1
