= Morgan Messner =

American soccer player (born 2000)

- Messner with the Portland Thorns in 2026

Personal information
- Full name: Morgan Lynn Messner
- Date of birth: February 17, 2000 (age 26)
- Place of birth: Drexel Hill, Pennsylvania, U.S.
- Height: 5 ft 10 in (1.78 m)
- Position: Goalkeeper

Team information
- Current team: Portland Thorns
- Number: 35

Youth career
- Penn Fusion

College career
Years	Team	Apps	(Gls)
2018–2021	Boston University Terriers	27	(0)
2021–2023	Penn State Nittany Lions	7	(0)

Senior career*
Years	Team	Apps	(Gls)
2022	Racing Louisville (USL W)	2	(0)
2024	San Diego Wave	0	(0)
2025–	Portland Thorns	3	(0)
- * Club domestic league appearances and goals as of March 25, 2026

Morgan Lynn Messner (born February 17, 2000) is an American professional soccer player who plays as a goalkeeper for Portland Thorns FC of the National Women's Soccer League (NWSL). She played college soccer for the Boston University Terriers and the Penn State Nittany Lions.

== Early life ==
A native of Drexel Hill, Pennsylvania, Messner attended The Episcopal Academy, where she was a four-year letterwinner and a team captain. She also competed in track and field for three years. Messner played youth soccer with Penn Fusion Soccer Academy, which she led to three ECNL National Playoff appearances. She was a two-time United Soccer Coaches All-East Region honoree and named to the All-Southeastern Pennsylvania Second Team in high school.

== College career ==
=== Boston University Terriers ===
Messner started her college career with the Boston University Terriers. In her freshman year, Messner played in 13 games and secured 7 shutouts. She contributed to Boston's Patriot League tournament victory, helping the team reclaim the title from Bucknell. Messner also earned a clean sheet in the Terriers' NCAA tournament game against LSU, an eventual defeat on penalties.

During her second season at Boston, Messner made 12 saves in a September fixture against Princeton, the highest in program history since 1997. In 2021, Messner was named to the United Soccer Coaches All-North Region Team. She ended her career with the Terriers having played in 27 matches overall.

=== Penn State Nittany Lions ===
After earning her undergraduate degree in Earth and Environmental Science, Messner transferred to Penn State in order to pursue a master's degree. Facing competition from starter Kat Asman, Messner played in 7 games across her two years at Penn State. She did not concede a goal during her time as a Nittany Lion.

== Club career ==
=== Racing Louisville (W League) ===
While a member of Penn State, Messner had her first club experience with the semi-professional USL W League affiliate of Racing Louisville FC during 2022. She appeared in 2 games during her stint with the club, her pair of appearances taking place only three days apart. In Messner's second match with Racing Louisville, she was subbed off in the first half due to an injury.

Following the completion of her collegiate career, Messner was invited to train with the Chicago Red Stars during 2023 preseason. She joined the club's roster as a non-roster invitee, linking back up with former Penn State teammates Ally Schlegel and Penelope Hocking.

=== San Diego Wave ===
Messner was a non-roster invitee on San Diego Wave FC's 2024 preseason roster, which was announced in January 2024. On March 13, 2024, she signed a one-year contract with the Wave. After backup goalkeeper Hillary Beall suffered a foot injury, Messner was able to make her professional debut on July 26, 2024, in an NWSL x Liga MX Femenil Summer Cup defeat against Club América. She also started the Wave's next Summer Cup match, an away game against Angel City FC. After earning her first professional shutout in the 0–0 draw, Messner stood in goal for the ensuing penalty shootout. She conceded all five of Angel City's spot-kicks as the Wave lost the shootout 5–3. At the end of the season, Messner was out of contract with the Wave.

=== Portland Thorns ===
In January 2025, Messner joined Portland Thorns FC as a non-roster invitee. It marked the third year in a row that she started off NWSL preseason as a trialist. She signed a one-year contract with Portland on March 4, 2025. During the game for third place at the 2024–25 CONCACAF W Champions Cup, she made her Thorns debut and kept a clean sheet in the 3–0 victory. On June 16, she extended her contract with the Thorns, keeping her in Portland through 2026.

With the absences of Mackenzie Arnold and Bella Bixby due to international duty and injury respectively, Messner made her NWSL regular-season debut with the start and clean sheet in a season-opening 1–0 win against the Washington Spirit on March 13, 2026. She played in the first three games of the season, keeping two clean sheets and earning one NWSL Save of the Week honor, until Arnold returned from Australia. On May 6, 2026, the Thorns signed Messner to a two-year extension through 2028.

== Career statistics ==
=== Club ===
As of June 16, 2025

Appearances and goals by club, season and competition
Club	Season	League			Cup (Note: Includes the NWSL Challenge Cup)		Playoffs (Note: Includes NWSL Playoffs)		Continental (Note: Includes CONCACAF W Champions Cup)		Other		Total	
Club	Season	Division	Apps	Goals	Apps	Goals	Apps	Goals	Apps	Goals	Apps	Goals	Apps	Goals
Racing Louisville FC	2022	USL W League	2	0	—		—		—		—		2	0
San Diego Wave FC	2024	NWSL	0	0	0	0	—		0	0	2 (Note: Includes NWSL x Liga MX Femenil Summer Cup)	0	2	0
Portland Thorns FC	2025	NWSL	0	0	0	0	—		1	0	—		1	0
Career total			2	0	0	0	0	0	1	0	2	0	5	0

== Honors ==
San Diego Wave FC

- NWSL Challenge Cup: 2024
