= 2024 San Diego Wave FC season =

San Diego Wave FC 2024 soccer season

2024 season
- Owner: Ron Burkle
- President: Jill Ellis
- Head coach: Casey Stoney (until Jun 24); Paul Buckle (until Aug 16); Landon Donovan (since Aug 16)
- Stadium: Snapdragon Stadium
- NWSL: 10th
- Challenge Cup: Champions
- NWSL x Liga MX Femenil Summer Cup: 2nd in Group B
- Playoffs: DNQ
- CONCACAF W Champions Cup: 3rd in Group B
- Top goalscorer: League: Jaedyn Shaw (4); All: María Sánchez (6)
- Highest home attendance: 32,066 (Mar 23 vs KC)
- Lowest home attendance: 10,289 (May 8 vs UTA)
- Average home league attendance: 19,575
- Biggest win: 2–0 (4 times); 3–1 (2 times)
- Biggest defeat: 0–3 (June 28 vs. CHI); 1–4 (2 times)
Home colors	Away colors
- All statistics correct as of November 3, 2024.

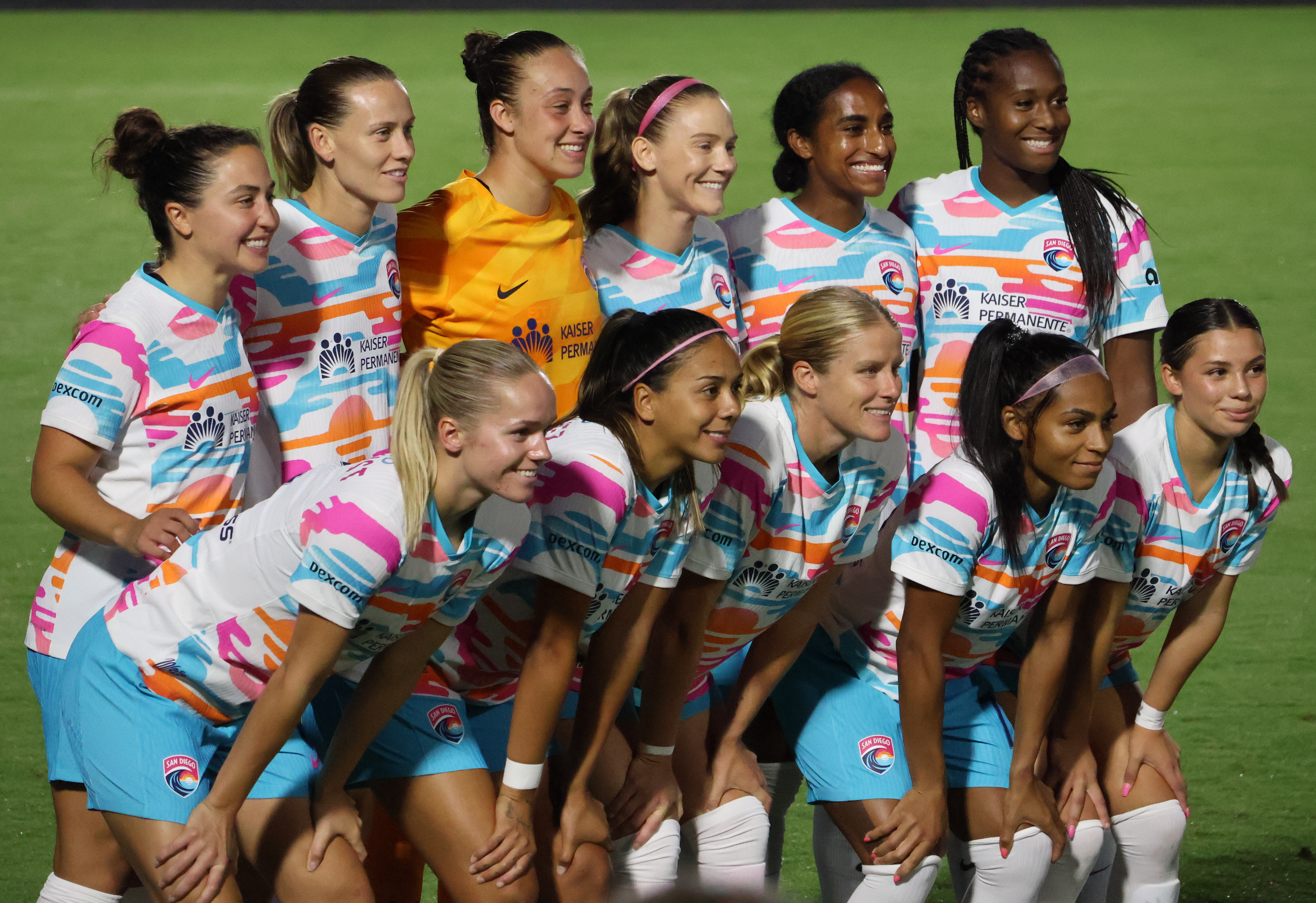
Week 23 starting lineup: Colaprico, van Egmond, Sheridan, McNabb, Girma, Ali Lundkvist, Sánchez, Doniak, Morroni, Barcenas

The 2024 San Diego Wave FC season is the team's third as a professional women's soccer team. The Wave compete in the National Women's Soccer League (NWSL), the top tier of women's soccer in the United States.

== Background ==
In the prior season, the Wave finished the season in 1st place, winning the NWSL Shield with an 11–7–4 record. In the NWSL Playoffs, the Wave sat out the quarterfinals with a first-round bye before facing a 1–0 defeat at the hands of the OL Reign in their semifinal match. It was the club's second semifinal playoff defeat in two years.

=== Staff changes ===
On January 23, 2024, the Wave extended head coach Casey Stoney's contract through the 2027 season, with a mutual option for 2028.

Club general manager Molly Downtain announced her resignation during the offseason, setting a departure date for April 15, 2024. Downtain was named the Wave's general manager in July 2021 and had managed the club in both previous seasons.

=== Offseason transactions ===
On November 21, 2023, the Wave waived defender Mia Gyau as part of the club's end-of-season roster decisions. Over the following months, the Wave worked to re-sign players, committing forwards Amirah Ali and Kyra Carusa to one-year contracts with options. The club also signed three of their four free agents to new deals, agreeing to two-year contracts with Makenzy Doniak, Christen Westphal, and Emily van Egmond. The Wave's fourth free agent, Madison Pogarch, did not re-sign with the club and instead joined 2024 expansion club Utah Royals.

With the 2024 NWSL expansion draft drawing nearer, the Wave also traded defender Kaleigh Riehl to the Utah Royals in exchange for $60,000 in Allocation Money and draft protection from the expansion club. The Wave did not trade for draft protection from Bay FC, resulting in the loss of forward Rachel Hill and midfielder Sierra Enge during the draft at the hands of the fellow Californian club. The Wave later reacquired Enge in a trade with Bay FC and the Houston Dash, sending the Wave's 2024 third-round NWSL Draft pick, $60,000 in allocation money, and midfielder Belle Briede to Houston in exchange for Enge.

Leading up to the 2024 NWSL Draft, the Wave signed free agent midfielder Savannah McCaskill from Angel City FC on December 20, 2023. In January 2024, the club transferred goalkeeper Shae Yanez to English club Bristol City and brought in Hillary Beall from Racing Louisville FC. Later, the Wave's goalkeeper corps would meet its final change of the offseason, with 2023 draftee Lauren Brzykcy and the club agreeing to a mutual contract termination.

During the NWSL Draft, the Wave selected Stanford defender Kennedy Wesley as the 12th overall pick. The club also drafted Canadian forward Mya Jones from Memphis as the 42nd overall pick. Both players later signed 2-year contracts with the Wave. On Draft Day, the club also traded Meggie Dougherty Howard to Angel City in exchange for $40,000 in allocation money. Ten days later, the Wave sent Taylor Kornieck to Racing Louisville FC for $150,000 in allocation money.

The Wave wrapped up their offseason transactions by bringing in two international players. In February, the club signed Swedish defender Hanna Lundkvist from Atlético Madrid and Australian defender Kaitlyn Torpey from Melbourne City. The transfer fee paid for Torpey was heavily rumored to be a new outbound Australian women's soccer record.

=== Kit changes ===
As part of a league-wide refresh, the Wave revealed their 2024 primary and secondary kits on February 27, 2024. The club's primary kit, titled 'Del Sol,' sports orange, pink, and turquoise patterns reminiscent of waves and the San Diego sunset. Bright pink colors are used for the team's secondary kit, named 'Poderosa'.

== Stadium and facilities ==
The Wave continued to play in Snapdragon Stadium in their second full season of residency. However, during the NWSL x Liga MX Femenil Summer Cup, the Wave returned to former home venue Torero Stadium for their first game of the tournament against Bay FC.

In the Wave's home opener at Snapdragon Stadium, the club set an NWSL home opener attendance record with 32,066 individuals attending the game.

Poor pitch conditions at Snapdragon Stadium were a source of criticism throughout the 2024 season. Two days before the Wave's season finale, a planned home fixture against Racing Louisville FC, the club announced that the match would be relocated to Lynn Family Stadium in Louisville. Field and player safety concerns were cited as key reasons for the move.

== Broadcasting ==
On May 8, 2024, the Wave renewed their partnership with San Diego broadcasters Fox 5 San Diego and KUSI to locally air all eight of the team's non-nationally broadcast matches over the course of the season.

== Team ==
=== Current squad ===
As of November 23, 2024.

No.	Pos.	Nation	Player
1	GK	CAN	Kailen Sheridan (Third Captain)
4	DF	USA	Naomi Girma
5	MF	AUS	Emily van Egmond
6	DF	SWE	Hanna Lundkvist
7	FW	USA	Amirah Ali
11	FW	USA	Jaedyn Shaw
12	DF	USA	Kennedy Wesley
14	DF	USA	Kristen McNabb
15	FW	USA	Makenzy Doniak
16	DF	AUS	Kaitlyn Torpey
17	MF	USA	Kimmi Ascanio
18	FW	CAN	Mya Jones
19	FW	IRL	Kyra Carusa
20	DF	USA	Christen Westphal
21	MF	USA	Savannah McCaskill
22	GK	USA	Hillary Beall
23	FW	USA	Elyse Bennett
24	MF	USA	Danielle Colaprico
25	FW	USA	Melanie Barcenas
35	GK	USA	Morgan Messner
69	FW	FRA	Delphine Cascarino
75	DF	FRA	Perle Morroni
77	FW	MEX	María Sánchez

=== Coaching staff ===
As of August 17, 2024.

Position	Staff
Head coach	Landon Donovan (interim)
Development Coach	Jackie Bachteler
Assistant Coach/Head of Goalkeeping	Louis Hunt
Technical and Development Coach	Craig Barclay
Director of Recruitment and Analytics	Chris Loxton

== Competitions ==
=== Friendlies ===
Wave FC opened the 2024 preseason at the Coachella Valley Invitational.

February 20	San Diego Wave FC	2–1	Bay FC	Indio, California
12 pm PT	Bennett 39'; Ali 78'	Report	Doms 53'	Stadium: Empire Polo Club

February 24	San Diego Wave FC	1–2	Portland Thorns FC	Indio, California
11 am PT	Canales 56'	Report	D'Aquila 49'; Wade-Katoa 71'	Stadium: Empire Polo Club

=== NWSL Challenge Cup ===
Challenge Cup has been reformatted to open each season as a single contest with the prior campaign’s winner of the NWSL Shield, presented by CarMax, against the reigning NWSL Champion.

At the start of 2024, the Wave kicked off the season on a positive note, winning the 2024 NWSL Challenge Cup 1–0 over 2023 champion NJ/NY Gotham FC.

March 15	NJ/NY Gotham FC	0–1	San Diego Wave FC	Harrison, New Jersey
5:00 pm PT		Report	Morgan 88'	Stadium: Red Bull Arena; Attendance: 14,241; Referee: Danielle Chesky

=== Regular season ===
The Wave failed to replicate their successes from 2022 and 2023, failing to qualify for the playoffs for the first time in club history and finishing in 10th place overall. The team was also knocked out during the group stages of both the 2024 NWSL x Liga MX Femenil Summer Cup and the 2024–25 CONCACAF W Champions Cup. The Wave also underwent several coaching changes, firing Casey Stoney after a poor run of form and replacing her with interim coaches Paul Buckle and later, Landon Donovan.

Pos	Team	Pld	W	D	L	GF	GA	GD	Pts	Qualification
8	Chicago Red Stars	26	10	2	14	31	38	−7	32	Playoffs
9	Racing Louisville FC	26	7	7	12	33	39	−6	28	
10	San Diego Wave FC	26	6	7	13	24	35	−11	25	
11	Utah Royals	26	7	4	15	22	40	−18	25	
12	Angel City FC	26	7	6	13	29	42	−13	24 (Note: Angel City FC were deducted three points for breaching spending cap rules.)	

Source: NWSL
Rules for classification: Tiebreakers
Notes:

March 23 1	San Diego Wave FC	1–2	Kansas City Current	San Diego, California
7:00 pm PT	Jakobsson 17'	Report	Hutton (yellow card) 24'; Rodriguez 44'; LaBonta 71' (pen.); Lavogez (yellow card) 90+9'	Stadium: Snapdragon Stadium; Attendance: 32,066; Referee: Brad Jensen

March 29 2	San Diego Wave FC	1–0	Seattle Reign FC	San Diego, California
7:00 pm PT	van Egmond 90+8'	Report	Barnes (yellow card) 33'	Stadium: Snapdragon Stadium; Attendance: 16,746; Referee: Alex Billeter

April 13 3	Racing Louisville FC	0–0	San Diego Wave FC	Louisville, Kentucky
4:30 pm PT	Milliet (yellow card) 35'; Howell (yellow card) 80'	Report	Lundkvist (yellow card) 35'	Stadium: Lynn Family Stadium; Attendance: 6,818; Referee: Rebeca Pagan

April 19 4	Orlando Pride	1–0	San Diego Wave FC	Orlando, Florida
5:00 pm PT	Yates 26'	Report	McCaskill (yellow card) 68'; Wesley (yellow card) 85'	Stadium: Inter&Co Stadium; Attendance: 7,701; Referee: Sergii Demianchuk

April 27 5	San Diego Wave FC	2–1	Bay FC	San Diego, California
7:00 pm PT	Colaprico (yellow card) 6'; Doniak 13'; Shaw 78'	Report	Oshoala 48'; Kundananji (yellow card) 83'	Stadium: Snapdragon Stadium; Attendance: 17,206; Referee: Elvis Osmanovic

May 3 6	Seattle Reign FC	2–1	San Diego Wave FC	Seattle, Washington
7:00 pm PT	King (red card) 9'; James-Turner (yellow card) 21'; Balcer 34'; Athens (yellow card) 51'; Huerta (yellow card) 65'; McClernon (yellow card) 78'; Latsko 89'	Report	Carusa 11'; Lundkvist (yellow card) 24'; Bennett (yellow card) 38'; van Egmond (yellow card) 50'; McCaskill (yellow card) 90+1'; McNabb (red card) 90+15'	Stadium: Lumen Field; Attendance: 7,030; Referee: Danielle Chesky

May 8 7	San Diego Wave FC	2–0	Utah Royals	San Diego, California
7:00 pm PT	Shaw 35' (pen.); Doniak 77'; Westphal (yellow card) 79'; Colaprico (yellow card) 87'	Report	Monaghan (yellow card) 34'; Pogarch (yellow card) 37'; Foederer (yellow card) 51'; Sentnor (yellow card) 95'	Stadium: Snapdragon Stadium; Attendance: 10,289; Referee: Katja Koroleva

May 12 8	San Diego Wave FC	1–1	NJ/NY Gotham FC	San Diego, California
5:00 pm PT	Lundkvist (yellow card) 30' (goal) 64'	Report	Stevens 25'; Bruninha (yellow card) 46'; González (yellow card) 71'; López (yellow card) 90+5'	Stadium: Snapdragon Stadium; Attendance: 16,024; Referee: Matthew Thompson

May 17 9	Bay FC	2–1	San Diego Wave FC	San Jose, California
7:30 pm PT	Boade (yellow card) 35'; Camberos 55'; Lundkvist 87' (o.g.)	Report	Carusa 23'; McCaskill (yellow card) 80'	Stadium: PayPal Park; Attendance: 16,930; Referee: Brad Jensen

May 23 10	Angel City FC	0–0	San Diego Wave FC	Los Angeles, California
7:00 pm PT	Hammond (yellow card) 69'; Nabet (yellow card) 90+8'	Report	Bennett (yellow card) 2'	Stadium: BMO Stadium; Attendance: 19,103; Referee: Elton Garcia

June 7 11	San Diego Wave FC	1–1	Orlando Pride	San Diego, California
7:00 pm PT	Girma (yellow card) 17'; Doniak 62'; Carusa (yellow card) 85'; van Egmond (yellow card) 87'	Report	Doyle 36'	Stadium: Snapdragon Stadium; Attendance: 17,073; Referee: Nabil Bensalah

June 15 12	Washington Spirit	1–1	San Diego Wave FC	Washington, D.C.
4:30 pm PT	Hershfelt (yellow card) 46'; Rodman (yellow card) 82'; Bethune 90+6'	Report	Shaw 20'; Dahlkemper (yellow card) 21'; Colaprico (yellow card) 48'; Morgan (yellow card) 66'; Torpey (yellow card) 87'	Stadium: Audi Field; Attendance: 19,897; Referee: Ekaterina Koroleva

June 19 13	NJ/NY Gotham FC	2–1	San Diego Wave FC	Harrison, New Jersey
4:00 pm PT	Lavelle 45+3'; Hiatt (yellow card) 63'; Freeman (yellow card) 79'; Bell 90+8'; Ryan (yellow card) 90+13'	Report	Jones 48'; Torpey (yellow card) 90+6'	Stadium: Red Bull Arena; Attendance: 10,718; Referee: Anya Voigt

June 22 14	Houston Dash	0–0	San Diego Wave FC	Houston, Texas
4:30 pm PT	Jacobs (yellow card) 81'	Report	Girma (yellow card) 90+7'	Stadium: Shell Energy Stadium; Attendance: 6,473; Referee: JC Griggs

June 28 15	San Diego Wave FC	0–3	Chicago Red Stars	San Diego, California
7:00 pm PT	McNabb (yellow card) 9'	Report	Girma 42' (o.g.); Hocking (yellow card) 45'; Swanson 67'; Joseph 69'; Staab (yellow card) 73'	Stadium: Snapdragon Stadium; Attendance: 24,115; Referee: Shawn Tehini

July 5 16	Portland Thorns FC	1–0	San Diego Wave FC	Portland, Oregon
7:00 pm PT	D'Aquila 85'; Dias (yellow card) 90'	Report	Lundkvist (yellow card) 22'; van Egmond (yellow card) 74'	Stadium: Providence Park; Attendance: 18,011; Referee: Alex Billeter

August 24 17	San Diego Wave FC	1–2	Angel City FC	San Diego, California
1:00 pm PT	Dahlkemper 90+7'	Report; Box	A. Thompson 20', 29'; Spencer (yellow card) 90+6'	Stadium: Snapdragon Stadium; Attendance: 20,500; Referee: Eric Tattersall

September 1 18	San Diego Wave FC	1–1	Washington Spirit	San Diego, California
5:00 pm PT	McNabb 30' (o.g.)	Report	McNabb 68'	Stadium: Snapdragon Stadium; Attendance: 23,541; Referee: Anya Voigt

September 8 19	San Diego Wave FC	1–4	North Carolina Courage	San Diego, California
5:00 pm PT	Wesley 13'; Sheridan (red card) 60'	Report	Hopkins 4'; O'Sullivan (yellow card) 8'; Rauch 21'; St-Georges 45'; Speck 90+4'	Stadium: Snapdragon Stadium; Attendance: 26,516; Referee: Brad Jensen

September 14 20	Utah Royals	1–2	San Diego Wave FC	Sandy, Utah
7:00 pm PT	Zornoza (yellow card) 57'; Lacasse 59'; Tejada (yellow card) 71'; Tucker (yellow card) 80'	Report	Ali 1'; Cascarino 6'	Stadium: America First Field; Attendance: 9,494; Referee: Laura Rodriguez

September 21 21	Chicago Red Stars	1–0	San Diego Wave FC	Bridgeview, Illinois
6:30 pm PT	Ludmila 12'; Bike (yellow card) 83'	Report	Morroni (yellow card) 16'; Sánchez (yellow card) 30'; Lundkvist (yellow card) 55'	Stadium: SeatGeek Stadium; Attendance: 5,045; Referee: Danielle Chesky

September 28 22	San Diego Wave FC	2–0	Portland Thorns FC	San Diego, California
7:00 pm PT	Jones 69'; Barcenas 74'	Report; Box		Stadium: Snapdragon Stadium; Attendance: 15,271; Referee: Elijio Arreguin

October 5 23	North Carolina Courage	2–1	San Diego Wave FC	Cary, North Carolina
4:00 pm PT	Aline Gomes 32'; Matsukubo 45+4'	Report	Lundkvist (yellow card) 45+9', (goal) 84'	Stadium: WakeMed Soccer Park; Referee: Melinda Sopka Homa

October 13 24	San Diego Wave FC	0–2	Houston Dash	San Diego, California
5:00 pm PT	Girma (yellow card) 29'; Shaw (yellow card) 79'	Report; Box	Olivieri 30' (pen.); Nagasato (yellow card) 45+7'; Bachmann 72'; Alozie (yellow card) 87'; Campbell (yellow card) 87'	Stadium: Snapdragon Stadium; Attendance: 15,549; Referee: Jaclyn Metz

October 19 25	Kansas City Current	4–1	San Diego Wave FC	Kansas City, Missouri
10:00 am PT	Cooper 17'; Sheridan 30' (o.g.); Chawinga 53'; Debinha 79'	Report	Morroni (yellow card) 66'; Cascarino 87'	Stadium: CPKC Stadium; Attendance: 11,500; Referee: Iryna Petrunok

November 3 26	Racing Louisville FC	1–3	San Diego Wave FC	Louisville, Kentucky
5:30 p.m. ET	Fischer (yellow card) 58'; Balcer 68'; Borges (yellow card) 86'	Report	Shaw 3'; Sánchez 22'; McNabb (yellow card) 60'; McCaskill 76'	Stadium: Lynn Family Stadium; Attendance: 2,137; Referee: Greg Dopka
Note: Relocated to Louisville on November 1 due to poor field conditions at Snapdragon Stadium.

=== NWSL x Liga MX Femenil Summer Cup ===
Pos	Team	Pld	W	PW	PL	L	GF	GA	GD	Pts	Qualification	LA	SD	AME	BAY
1	(United States Soccer Federation) Angel City FC	3	2	1	0	0	4	1	+3	8	Advances to knockout stage	—	0–0	2–1	2–0
2	(United States Soccer Federation) San Diego Wave FC	3	1	0	1	1	3	3	0	4		0–0	—	0–2	3–1
3	(Mexican Football Federation) Club América	3	1	0	0	2	4	4	0	3		1–2	2–0	—	1–2
4	(United States Soccer Federation) Bay FC	3	1	0	0	2	3	6	−3	3		0–2	1–3	2–1	—

Source: NWSL
Rules for classification: tiebreakers

July 20 1	San Diego Wave FC (United States)	3–1	(United States) Bay FC	San Diego, California
7:00 p.m. PDT	McNabb (yellow card) 36'; Wesley 45+1'; Sánchez 53'; Ali 80'	Report	Moreau 63'	Stadium: Torero Stadium; Referee: Iryna Petrunok

July 26 2	San Diego Wave FC (United States)	0–2	(Mexico) Club América	San Diego, California
7:00 p.m. PDT		Report	Luna (yellow card) 69', (goal) 78'; Palacios 90+5'	Stadium: Snapdragon Stadium

August 1 3	Angel City FC (United States)	0–0 (5–3 p)	(United States) San Diego Wave FC	Fullerton, California
7:00 p.m. PDT	Curry (yellow card) 77'	Report		Stadium: Titan Stadium; Referee: Jaclyn Metz
	Penalties
	Emslie (penalty scored); Press (penalty scored); Thompson (penalty scored); Rodríguez (penalty scored); Fuller (penalty scored)		McCaskill (penalty scored); Ali (penalty missed); Doniak (penalty scored); Barcenas (penalty scored)

=== 2024–25 CONCACAF W Champions Cup ===
Pos	Team	Pld	W	D	L	GF	GA	GD	Pts	Qualification	AME	POR	SDW	WFC	SFE
1	(Mexico) América	4	3	0	1	14	3	+11	9	Advance to knockout stage	—	—	—	7–0	5–0
2	(United States) Portland Thorns	4	3	0	1	13	5	+8	9	Advance to knockout stage	3–1	—	—	—	2–1
3	(United States) San Diego Wave	4	3	0	1	7	3	+4	9		0–1	3–2	—	—	—
4	(Canada) Whitecaps Girls Elite	4	1	0	3	2	16	−14	3		—	0–6	0–2	—	—
5	(Panama) Santa Fe	4	0	0	4	2	11	−9	0		—	—	0–2	1–2	—

Source: CONCACAF
Rules for classification: Tiebreakers

San Diego Wave FC qualified as the 2023 National Women's Soccer League Shield winners.

August 20 1	Santa Fe FC (Panama)	0–2	(United States) San Diego Wave FC	Panama City, Panama
7:00 p.m. PDT (UTC-7)	Onodera (yellow card) 66'	Report	Sánchez 2'; McNabb 64'; Lundkvist (yellow card) 75'; Jakobsson (yellow card) 78'	Stadium: Estadio Rommel Fernández; Referee: Astrid Gramajo

September 18 2	San Diego Wave FC (United States)	3–2	(United States) Portland Thorns	San Diego, United States
7:00 p.m. PDT (UTC-7)	Sánchez 67' (pen.), 69', 85' (pen.)	Report	Smith 25'; Turner 54'	Stadium: Snapdragon Stadium; Referee: Merlin Soto

October 1 3	Whitecaps FC Girls Elite (Canada)	0–2	(United States) San Diego Wave FC	Vancouver, Canada
5:30 p.m. PDT (UTC-7)		Report	Torpey 59'; Ali 67'	Stadium: BC Place; Referee: Aranza Quiero

October 16 4	San Diego Wave FC (United States)	0–1	(Mexico) Club América Femenil	San Diego, United States
7:00 p.m. PDT (UTC-7)	Sheridan (red card) 23'; van Egmond (yellow card) 56'	Report	Luebbert 59'	Stadium: Snapdragon Stadium; Referee: Crystal Sobers

== Squad statistics ==
As of match played November 3, 2024

=== Appearances ===
As of match played November 3, 2024; only players who have made appearances are listed.

Starting appearances are listed first, followed by substitute appearances after the + symbol where applicable.

No.	Pos	Nat	Player	Total		NWSL		Challenge Cup		Summer Cup		Champions Cup	
No.	Pos	Nat	Player	Apps	Goals	Apps	Goals	Apps	Goals	Apps	Goals	Apps	Goals
Goalkeepers
1	GK	(Canada) CAN	Kailen Sheridan	29	0	25	0	1	0	0	0	3	0
22	GK	(United States) USA	Hillary Beall	5	0	1+1	0	0	0	1	0	1+1	0
35	GK	(United States) USA	Morgan Messner	2	0	0	0	0	0	2	0	0	0
Defenders
4	DF	(United States) USA	Naomi Girma	23	0	20	0	1	0	0	0	2	0
5	DF	(Sweden) SWE	Hanna Lundkvist	29	2	20+3	2	1	0	1	0	4	0
12	DF	(United States) USA	Kennedy Wesley	16	2	12+1	1	0	0	1	1	1+1	0
14	DF	(United States) USA	Kristen McNabb	31	2	21+3	1	0	0	3	0	4	1
16	DF	(Australia) AUS	Kaitlyn Torpey	17	1	4+10	0	0+1	0	0	0	1+1	1
20	DF	(United States) USA	Christen Westphal	22	0	8+7	0	1	0	3	0	2+1	0
75	DF	(France) FRA	Perle Morroni	8	0	1+5	0	0	0	0	0	2	0
Midfielders
5	MF	(Australia) AUS	Emily van Egmond	31	1	19+7	1	1	0	0	0	3+1	0
17	MF	(United States) USA	Kimmi Ascanio	9	0	2+4	0	0	0	0+2	0	1	0
21	MF	(United States) USA	Savannah McCaskill	25	1	16+4	1	1	0	3	0	0+1	0
24	MF	(United States) USA	Danielle Colaprico	29	0	18+5	0	0+1	0	3	0	2	0
Forwards
7	FW	(United States) USA	Amirah Ali	21	3	10+4	1	0+1	0	0+3	1	1+2	1
11	FW	(United States) USA	Jaedyn Shaw	25	4	13+9	4	1	0	0	0	2	0
15	FW	(United States) USA	Makenzy Doniak	32	3	17+7	3	1	0	3	0	2+2	0
18	FW	(Canada) CAN	Mya Jones	24	2	12+7	2	0	0	0+1	0	2+2	0
19	FW	(Republic of Ireland) IRL	Kyra Carusa	19	2	7+10	2	1	0	0	0	0+1	0
23	FW	(United States) USA	Elyse Bennett	21	0	2+12	0	1	0	2+1	0	1+2	0
25	FW	(United States) USA	Melanie Barcenas	16	1	6+4	1	0	0	0+3	0	3	0
69	FW	(France) FRA	Delphine Cascarino	13	2	7+3	2	0	0	0	0	2+1	0
77	FW	(Mexico) MEX	María Sánchez	29	6	18+4	1	0	0	3	1	3+1	4
Players who appeared for the club but left during the season:
2	DF	(United States) USA	Abby Dahlkemper	17	1	12+1	1	1	0	3	0	0	0
8	MF	(United States) USA	Sierra Enge	4	0	1	0	0	0	1+2	0	0	0
10	FW	(Sweden) SWE	Sofia Jakobsson	15	1	6+6	1	0+1	0	1	0	1	0
13	FW	(United States) USA	Alex Morgan	18	1	10+3	0	0+1	1	3	0	1	0

=== Goals ===
Rank	No.	Pos.	Nat.	Name	NWSL	Challenge Cup	Summer Cup	Champions Cup	Total
1	77	FW	(Mexico)	María Sánchez	1	0	1	4	6
2	11	FW	(United States)	Jaedyn Shaw	4	0	0	0	4
3	15	FW	(United States)	Makenzy Doniak	3	0	0	0	3
4	7	FW	(United States)	Amirah Ali	1	0	1	1	3
5	6	DF	(Sweden)	Hanna Lundkvist	2	0	0	0	2
5	18	FW	(Canada)	Mya Jones	2	0	0	0	2
5	19	FW	(Republic of Ireland)	Kyra Carusa	2	0	0	0	2
5	69	FW	(France)	Delphine Cascarino	2	0	0	0	2
6	12	DF	(United States)	Kennedy Wesley	1	0	1	0	2
6	14	DF	(United States)	Kristen McNabb	1	0	0	1	2
7	2	DF	(United States)	Abby Dahlkemper	1	0	0	0	1
7	5	MF	(Australia)	Emily van Egmond	1	0	0	0	1
7	10	FW	(Sweden)	Sofia Jakobsson	1	0	0	0	1
7	21	MF	(United States)	Savannah McCaskill	1	0	0	0	1
7	25	FW	(United States)	Melanie Barcenas	1	0	0	0	1
8	13	FW	(United States)	Alex Morgan	0	1	0	0	1
8	16	DF	(Australia)	Kaitlyn Torpey	0	0	0	1	1
Own goals					0	0	0	0	0
Total					24	1	3	7	35

=== Assists ===
Rank	No.	Pos.	Nat.	Name	NWSL	Challenge Cup	Summer Cup	Champions Cup	Total
1	77	FW	(Mexico)	María Sánchez	4	0	1	0	5
2	69	FW	(France)	Delphine Cascarino	3	0	0	1	4
3	17	MF	(United States)	Kimmi Ascanio	1	0	0	1	2
3	21	MF	(United States)	Savannah McCaskill	1	1	0	0	2
4	6	DF	(Sweden)	Hanna Lundkvist	0	0	0	2	2
5	11	FW	(United States)	Jaedyn Shaw	1	0	0	0	1
5	13	FW	(United States)	Alex Morgan	1	0	0	0	1
5	14	FW	(United States)	Makenzy Doniak	1	0	0	0	1
5	23	FW	(United States)	Elyse Bennett	1	0	0	0	1
6	24	MF	(United States)	Danielle Colaprico	0	0	1	0	1
Total					13	1	2	4	20

=== Shutouts ===
Rank	No.	Pos.	Nat.	Name	NWSL	Challenge Cup	Summer Cup	Champions Cup	Total
1	1	GK	(Canada)	Kailen Sheridan	6	1	0	1	8
2	22	GK	(United States)	Hillary Beall	0	0	0	1	1
2	35	GK	(United States)	Morgan Messner	0	0	1	0	1
Total					6	1	1	2	10

=== Disciplinary record ===
No.	Pos.	Nat.	Name	NWSL			Challenge Cup			Summer Cup			Champions Cup			Total		
No.	Pos.	Nat.	Name	Booked	(yellow card) (yellow-red card)	Sent off (straight red)	Booked	(yellow card) (yellow-red card)	Sent off (straight red)	Booked	(yellow card) (yellow-red card)	Sent off (straight red)	Booked	(yellow card) (yellow-red card)	Sent off (straight red)	Booked	(yellow card) (yellow-red card)	Sent off (straight red)
1	GK	(Canada)	Kailen Sheridan	0	0	1	0	0	0	0	0	0	0	0	1	0	0	2
2	DF	(United States)	Abby Dahlkemper	1	0	0	0	0	0	0	0	0	0	0	0	1	0	0
4	DF	(United States)	Naomi Girma	3	0	0	0	0	0	0	0	0	0	0	0	3	0	0
5	MF	(Australia)	Emily van Egmond	3	0	0	0	0	0	0	0	0	1	0	0	4	0	0
6	DF	(Sweden)	Hanna Lundkvist	6	0	0	0	0	0	0	0	0	1	0	0	7	0	0
10	FW	(Sweden)	Sofia Jakobsson	0	0	0	0	0	0	0	0	0	1	0	0	1	0	0
11	FW	(United States)	Jaedyn Shaw	1	0	0	0	0	0	0	0	0	0	0	0	1	0	0
12	DF	(United States)	Kennedy Wesley	1	0	0	0	0	0	0	0	0	0	0	0	1	0	0
13	FW	(United States)	Alex Morgan	1	0	0	0	0	0	0	0	0	0	0	0	1	0	0
14	DF	(United States)	Kristen McNabb	2	0	1	0	0	0	1	0	0	0	0	0	3	0	1
16	DF	(Australia)	Kaitlyn Torpey	2	0	0	0	0	0	0	0	0	0	0	0	2	0	0
19	FW	(Republic of Ireland)	Kyra Carusa	1	0	0	0	0	0	0	0	0	0	0	0	1	0	0
20	DF	(United States)	Christen Westphal	1	0	0	0	0	0	0	0	0	0	0	0	1	0	0
21	MF	(United States)	Savannah McCaskill	3	0	0	0	0	0	0	0	0	0	0	0	3	0	0
23	FW	(United States)	Elyse Bennett	2	0	0	0	0	0	0	0	0	0	0	0	2	0	0
24	MF	(United States)	Danielle Colaprico	3	0	0	0	0	0	0	0	0	0	0	0	3	0	0
75	DF	(France)	Perle Morroni	2	0	0	0	0	0	0	0	0	0	0	0	2	0	0
77	FW	(Mexico)	María Sánchez	1	0	0	0	0	0	0	0	0	0	0	0	1	0	0
Total				33	0	2	0	0	0	1	0	0	3	0	0	37	0	3

== Transactions ==
=== 2024 NWSL Draft ===
Draft picks are not automatically signed to the team roster.

Round	Pick	Player	Pos.	College	Status	Ref.
1	12	(United States) Kennedy Wesley	DF	Stanford Cardinal	Signed to a two-year contract on January 8, 2024.	
3	42	(Canada) Mya Jones	FW	Memphis Tigers	Signed to a two-year contract on January 6, 2024.	

=== Contract operations ===
Contract options
Date	Player	Pos.	Notes	Ref.
November 20, 2023	(United States) Sierra Enge	MF	Option exercised.	

Re-signings
Date	Player	Pos.	Notes	Ref.
December 7, 2023	(United States) Amirah Ali	FW	Re-signed to a one-year contract with an option.	
December 21, 2023	(United States) Makenzy Doniak	FW	Free agent re-signed to a two-year contract.	
December 28, 2023	(United States) Christen Westphal	DF	Free agent re-signed to a two-year contract.	
January 9, 2024	(Republic of Ireland) Kyra Carusa	FW	Re-signed to a one-year contract with an option.	
January 10, 2024	(Australia) Emily van Egmond	MF	Free agent re-signed to a two-year contract.	
October 24, 2024	(United States) Kristen McNabb	DF	Re-signed to a two-year contract through 2026.	

=== Transfers in ===
Date	Player	Pos.	Previous club	Fee/notes	Ref.
December 17, 2023	(United States) Sierra Enge	MF	(United States) Houston Dash	In exchange for midfielder Belle Briede, the Wave's 2024 natural third-round NWSL Draft pick, and $60,000 in allocation money.	
December 17, 2023	(United States) Elyse Bennett	FW	(United States) Utah Royals	In exchange for $40,000 in allocation money.	
December 20, 2023	(United States) Savannah McCaskill	MF	(United States) Angel City	Free agent signing.	
January 8, 2024	(United States) Hillary Beall	GK	(United States) Racing Louisville FC	In exchange for natural second-round pick in the 2025 NWSL Draft.	
February 1, 2024	(Sweden) Hanna Lundkvist	DF	(Spain) Atlético Madrid	In exchange for an undisclosed fee.	
February 5, 2024	(Australia) Kaitlyn Torpey	DF	(Australia) Melbourne City	In exchange for an undisclosed fee.	
March 13, 2024	(United States) Morgan Messner	GK	(United States) Chicago Red Stars	Free agent signing.	
March 22, 2024	(United States) Kimmi Ascanio	MF	(United States) Florida United SC	Signed with NWSL Under-18 Entry Mechanism.	
April 20, 2024	(Mexico) María Sánchez	FW	(United States) Houston Dash	In exchange for $300,000 in intra-league transfer funds, $200,000 in allocation money, and a 2024/2025 international roster spot.	
July 18, 2024	(United States) Chai Cortez	DF	(United States) San Diego Wave FC	Short-term national team replacement player signings.	
July 18, 2024	(United States) Caroline DeLisle	GK	(United States) UCF Knights	Short-term national team replacement player signings.	
July 24, 2024	(France) Delphine Cascarino	FW	(France) Lyon	Free transfer	
July 26, 2024	(United States) Emma Vanderhyden	DF	(United States) UC Santa Barbara Gauchos	Short-term national team replacement player signing.	
August 22, 2024	(France) Perle Morroni	DF	(France) Lyon	Free transfer	
September 14, 2024	(United States) Mackenzie Rath	GK	(United States) Minnesota State Mavericks	Short-term injury replacement player signing.	

=== Transfers out ===
Date	Player	Pos.	Destination club	Fee/notes	Ref.
November 20, 2023	(United States) Mia Gyau	DF	(France) Stade de Reims	Waived.	
November 20, 2023	(United States) Giovanna DeMarco	MF	(United States) Carolina Ascent FC	Out of contract.	
November 20, 2023	(United States) Madison Pogarch	DF	(United States) Utah Royals	Free agent.	
November 20, 2023	(United States) Kaleigh Riehl	DF	(United States) Utah Royals	In exchange for $60,000 in Allocation Money and 2024 Expansion Protection from Utah Royals.	
December 15, 2023	(United States) Rachel Hill	FW	(United States) Bay FC	2024 NWSL Expansion Draft	
December 15, 2023	(United States) Sierra Enge	MF	(United States) Bay FC	2024 NWSL Expansion Draft	
December 17, 2023	(United States) Belle Briede	MF	(United States) Houston Dash	In exchange for midfielder Sierra Enge.	
January 5, 2024	(England) Shae Yanez	GK	(England) Bristol City	Transferred out for an undisclosed transfer fee.	
January 12, 2024	(United States) Meggie Dougherty Howard	MF	(United States) Angel City FC	In exchange for $40,000 in Allocation Money.	
January 22, 2024	(United States) Taylor Kornieck	MF	(United States) Racing Louisville FC	In exchange for $150,000 in Allocation Money.	
January 29, 2024	(United States) Lauren Brzykcy	GK	(Sweden) Vittsjö GIK	Mutual contract termination.	
August 3, 2024	(United States) Chai Cortez	DF	Unattached	National team replacement signing released.	
August 3, 2024	(United States) Emma Vanderhyden	DF	Unattached	National team replacement signing released.	
August 9, 2024	(United States) Caroline DeLisle	GK	(Sweden) IFK Norrköping	National team replacement signing released.	
August 13, 2024	(United States) Sierra Enge	DF	(France) RC Strasbourg Alsace	Mutual contract termination.	
August 26, 2024	(United States) Abby Dahlkemper	DF	(United States) Bay FC	In exchange for $50,000 in Allocation Money.	
September 11, 2024	(Sweden) Sofia Jakobsson	FW	(England) London City Lionesses	Mutual contract termination.	

=== Retirements ===
Date	Player	Pos.	Ref.
January 26, 2024	(United States) Kelsey Turnbow	MF	
September 8, 2024	(United States) Alex Morgan	FW	

=== Preseason trialists ===
Trialists are non-rostered invitees during preseason and are not automatically signed. The Wave released their preseason roster on January 29, 2024.

Player	Pos.	Previous club	Notes	Ref.
(United States) Gracie Brian	MF	(United States) TCU Horned Frogs	Not signed.	
(United States) Marley Canales	DF	(United States) OL Reign	Not signed.	
(United States) Caroline DeLisle	GK	(United States) UCF Knights	Signed as a national team replacement player.	
(United States) Morgan Messner	GK	(United States) Chicago Red Stars	Signed to a one-year contract.	
(United States) Taylor Porter	MF	(United States) Portland Thorns FC	Not signed.	

== Awards ==
=== NWSL monthly awards ===
==== Best XI of the Month ====
Month	Nat.	Pos.	Player	Ref.
March/April	(United States)	DF	Naomi Girma	
September	(United States)	DF	Naomi Girma (2)	

==== Rookie of the Month ====
Month	Nat.	Pos.	Player	Ref.
September	(United States)	DF	Kennedy Wesley	

=== NWSL weekly awards ===
==== Goal of the Week ====
Wk.	Nat.	Player	Won	Ref.
3	(Australia)	Emily van Egmond	Nom.	
24	(France)	Delphine Cascarino	Nom.	

==== Save of the Week ====
Wk.	Nat.	Player	Won	Ref.
2	(Canada)	Kailen Sheridan	Nom.	
4	(Canada)	Kailen Sheridan	Nom.	
5	(Canada)	Kailen Sheridan	Nom.	
10	(Canada)	Kailen Sheridan	Nom.	
12	(Canada)	Kailen Sheridan	Won	
16	(Canada)	Kailen Sheridan	Nom.	
17	(Canada)	Kailen Sheridan	Nom.	
