= Djurö, Värmdö Municipality =

Djurö
- Location within Stockholm Location within Sweden Location within European Union
- Coordinates: 59°18′45″N 18°42′15″E
- Country: Sweden
- Province: Uppland
- County: Stockholm County
- Municipality: Värmdö Municipality

Area
  - Total: 0.92 km^{2} (0.36 sq mi)

Population (31 December 2020)
  - Total: 1,179
  - Density: 1,300/km^{2} (3,300/sq mi)
- Time zone: UTC+1 (CET)
  - Summer (DST): UTC+2 (CEST)

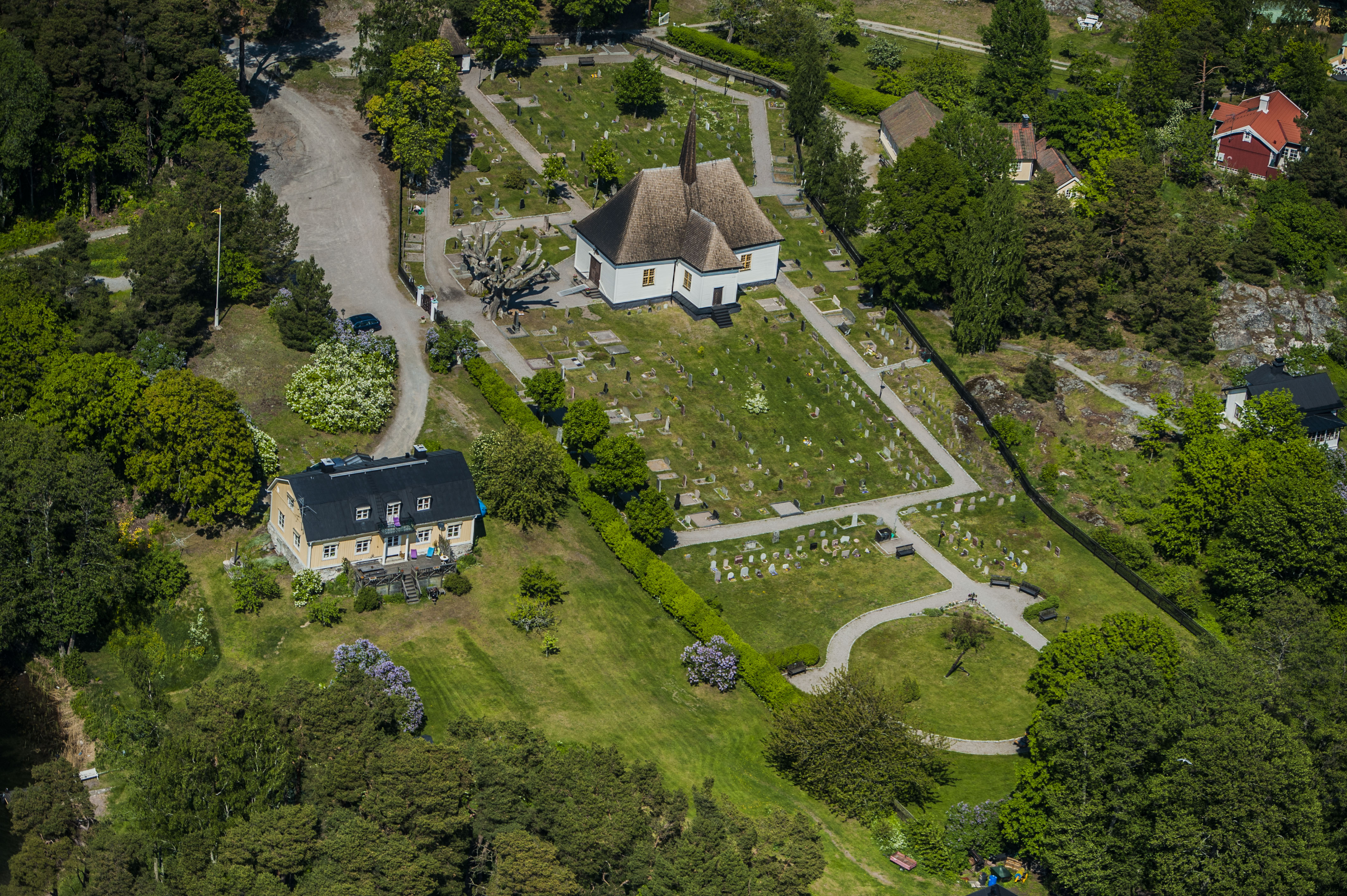
Aerial view

Djurö is an island and a locality situated in Värmdö Municipality, Stockholm County, Sweden with 967 inhabitants in 2010.

== Notable people ==
- Hanna Lundkvist (born 2002), footballer for the Sweden national team
