= Issachar ben Mordecai ibn Susan =

16th-century Jewish mathematician

Issachar ben Mordecai ibn Susan (Hebrew: יששכר בן מרדכי אבן שושן; fl. 1539–1572) was a Jewish mathematician who lived in Ottoman Palestine.

At a young age, he moved from Morocco—perhaps from Fes—to Jerusalem, where he became a pupil of Levi ibn Ḥabib. From there he went to Safed, where, under great hardship, he continued his studies. But his increasing poverty induced him, in 1539, to leave Safed and seek a living elsewhere.

At this time he commenced work on the calendar, giving, among other things, tables which embraced the years 5299–6000 and (1539–2240). After his return to Safed he resumed his work on the calendar, in which he was assisted by the dayan Joshua. It was published at Salonica, in 1564, under the title Tikkun Yissakar. The second edition, under the title Ibbur Shanim (Venice, 1578), is not as rare as the first. The tables in both editions begin with the year of publication.

The book also contains, in two appendixes, a treatise on rites ("minhagim") depending upon the variations in the calendar from year to year, and a treatise on the division of the weekly portions and the hafṭarot according to the ritual of the different congregations. For the latter treatise the author quotes as his source ancient manuscript commentaries, and holds that, according to the opinion of a certain scholar, the division of the weekly portions is to be traced back to Ezra. Rites, anonymously given, are, according to p. 51, 2d edition, taken from Abudarham, to whom the author attributes great authority.

== Jewish Encyclopedia bibliography ==
- Fuenn, Keneset Yisrael, i.704;
- Fürst, Bibl. Jud. iii.396;
- Steinschneider, Cat. Bodl. col. 1061;
- idem, in Abhandlungen zur Gesch. der Mathematik, 1899, ix.479.
