= Issachar Berman ben Naphtali ha-kohen =

16th-century Polish commentator on Midrash (and the Bible)

Issachar Berman Ben Naphtali Ha-kohen (Hebrew: יששכר ב(ע)ר בן נפתלי הכהן/כץ) (Note: Also known as B[a]erman[n] Ashkenazi (ברמן אשכנזי), Issachar Baer b. Naphtali (ha-Cohen/Hakohen), and other variations.) was a 16th-century Polish commentator on Midrash (and the Bible), considered by some to be "the foremost of all Midrash commentators", best known for his work Mat(te)not Kehun(n)ah (מתנות כהונה) on the Midrash Rabbah. He was born in Szczebrzeszyn, Poland, where he also died (after 1608).

According to some, he was a student of Moses Isserles.

His Mattenot Kehunnah (completed in 1584, printed in 1587–88) was a critical edition of the Midrash Rabbah with commentary. It became among the most influential works on the Midrash Rabbah, and has been included in almost every edition on account of its textual accuracy and the clear, concise manner in which it explains the simple/straightforward meaning of the text. He put great effort into determining and preserving the correct wording of the text, making use of multiple texts, both printed and manuscript, to determine the most accurate wording, and insisting that the printers take care not to introduce new errors. He also sought out individuals familiar with other languages such as Arabic and Latin to clarify certain points where foreign words were used; however, it appears that the information he received was not always so accurate. He also seems to have had some familiarity with medicine and astronomy/physics.

He also wrote a lesser-known work called Mar'eh Kohen (מראה כהן), composed of two parts: one on theology, and the other an index to verses found in the Zohar; (subjects and non-pentateuchal), as well as a commentary on the Bible which has been lost. The Mareh Kohen is notable for being one of the earliest published indexes of a Hebrew work.

We do not know much about his family other than that he had a brother Isaac (Ben Naphtali Ha-)Cohen of Ostrog who wrote a work called Ḳiẓẓur MizraḦi, and a great-grandson named Abraham b. Eliezer ha-Kohen.
