= List of San Diego Wave FC players =

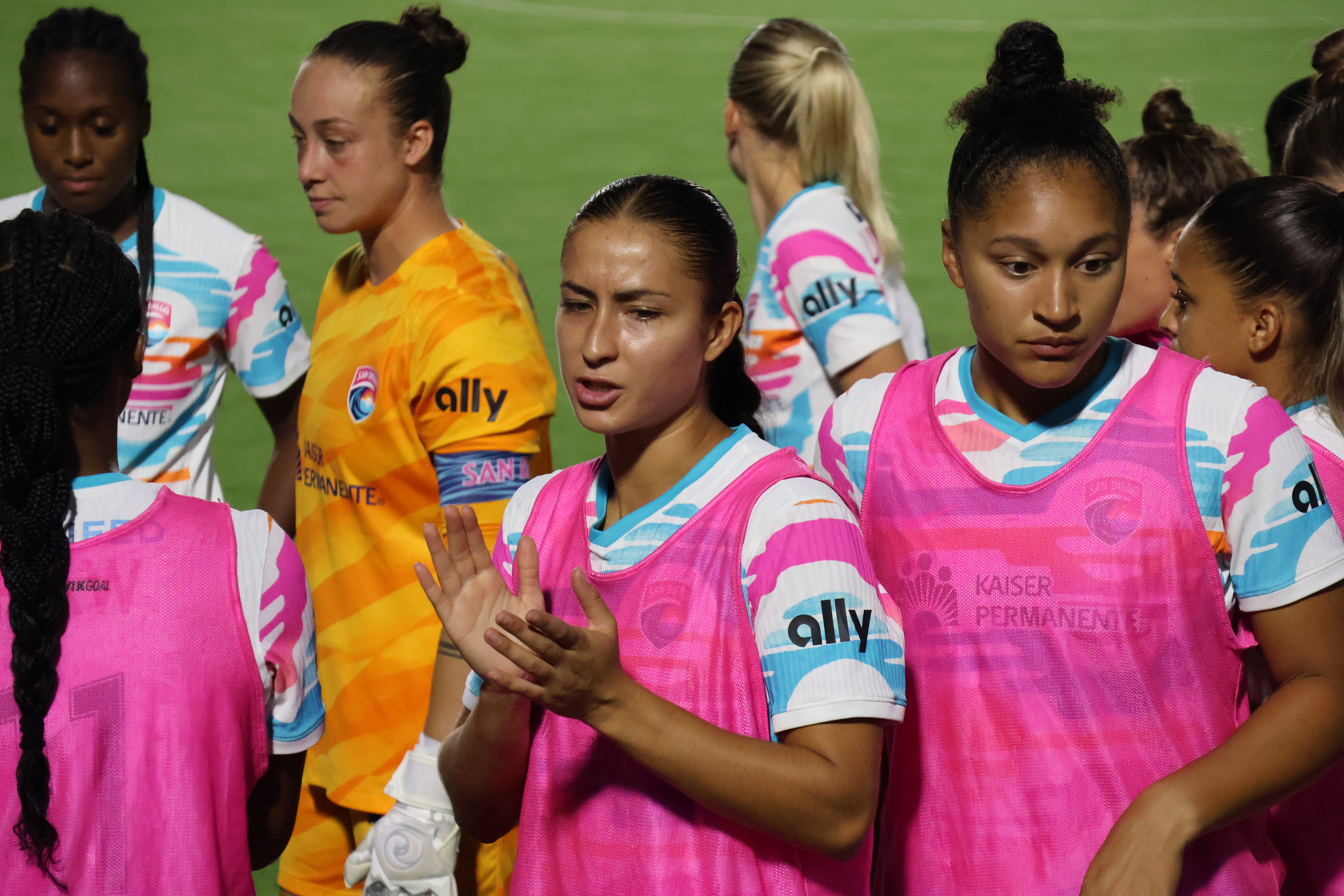
San Diego Wave FC players exit a team huddle before a match against the North Carolina Courage on October 5, 2024.

San Diego Wave FC is an American professional women's soccer club which began play in the National Women's Soccer League (NWSL) in 2022 as an expansion team. All players who have made at least one competitive appearance for the San Diego Wave are listed below.

== Key ==
- The list is ordered alphabetically.
- Appearances as a substitute are included.
- Statistics are correct as of November 9, 2025, the end of the 2025 NWSL season, and are updated once a year after the conclusion of the NWSL season.
- Players whose names are highlighted in **bold** were active players on the Wave roster as of the list's most recent update.

Positions key
GK	Goalkeeper
DF	Defender
MF	Midfielder
FW	Forward

Nationality
Unless otherwise noted, the nationality of a player is determined by the country they most recently represented in international play, or if said player has not played international football then by their country of birth.
Position
Playing positions are listed according to the player's roster designation as of the list's most recent update.
Years
Years are defined as the first and last calendar years in which the player was rostered for the club in any of the competitions listed below.
Appearances and goals
This list counts appearances and goals in the National Women's Soccer League, NWSL Playoffs, NWSL Challenge Cup, CONCACAF W Champions Cup, and NWSL x Liga MX Femenil Summer Cup.

== Players ==
Yrs	No.	Pos	Nat	Player	Total		NWSL		Playoffs		Cup (Note: Includes the NWSL Challenge Cup)		Other (Note: Includes the CONCACAF W Champions Cup and the NWSL x Liga MX Femenil Summer Cup)	
Yrs	No.	Pos	Nat	Player	Apps	Goals	Apps	Goals	Apps	Goals	Apps	Goals	Apps	Goals
2022–2024	7	FW	(United States) USA	Amirah Ali	68	8	48	5	3	0	11	1	6	2
2022	35	MF	(United States) USA	Jackie Altschuld	2	0	2	0	0	0	0	0	0	0
2025–	30	DF	(Colombia) COL	Daniela Arias	2	0	2	0	0	0	0	0	0	0
2025–	3	DF	(United States) USA	Trinity Armstrong	24	1	23	1	1	0	0	0	0	0
2024–	17	MF	(United States) USA	Kimmi Ascanio	36	4	32	4	1	0	0	0	3	0
2023–	25	FW	(United States) USA	Melanie Barcenas	45	2	34	2	0	0	5	0	6	0
2024–2025	22	GK	(United States) USA	Hillary Beall	5	0	2	0	0	0	0	0	3	0
2024	23	FW	(United States) USA	Elyse Bennett	21	0	14	0	0	0	1	0	6	0
2022–2023	23	MF	(United States) USA	Belle Briede	39	3	26	2	2	0	11	1	0	0
2025–	5	FW	(United States) USA	Trinity Byars	1	0	0	0	1	0	0	0	0	0
2023–2025	19	FW	(Republic of Ireland) IRL	Kyra Carusa	41	4	38	4	1	0	1	0	1	0
2024–2025	69, 20	FW	(France) FRA	Delphine Cascarino	38	7	34	7	1	0	0	0	3	0
2023–2024	24	MF	(United States) USA	Danielle Colaprico	57	1	45	0	1	0	6	1	5	0
2023	27	FW	(United States) USA	Shea Connors	2	0	1	0	0	0	1	0	0	0
2025–	11	MF	(Germany) GER	Gia Corley	25	2	24	2	1	0	0	0	0	0
2023, 2024	46	DF	(United States) USA	Chai Cortez	3	0	2	0	0	0	1	0	0	0
2022–2024	2	DF	(United States) USA	Abby Dahlkemper (Note: Dahlkemper was the first ever player to join the Wave, announced on November 22, 2021.)	37	2	26	2	1	0	7	0	3	0
2025–	10	MF	(France) FRA	Kenza Dali	27	5	26	5	1	0	0	0	0	0
2023	12	MF	(United States) USA	Giovanna DeMarco	2	0	0	0	0	0	2	0	0	0
2025–	88	FW	(Brazil) BRA	Dudinha	11	5	10	5	1	0	0	0	0	0
2023	28	MF	(United States) USA	Meggie Dougherty Howard	17	0	12	0	0	0	5	0	0	0
2025	24	MF	(Nigeria) NGA	Favour Emmanuel	2	0	2	0	0	0	0	0	0	0
2023–2024	8	MF	(United States) USA	Sierra Enge	18	2	11	2	0	0	4	0	3	0
2025–	18	MF	(United States) USA	Laurina Fazer	10	0	9	0	1	0	0	0	0	0
2025–	28	MF	(United States) USA	Jordan Fusco	8	0	7	0	1	0	0	0	0	0
2022–2024	4	DF	(United States) USA	Naomi Girma (Note: Girma was the first-ever NWSL Draft selection by the Wave, selected first overall in the 2024 NWSL Draft.)	72	0	58	0	3	0	9	0	2	0
2022–2023	26	DF	(United States) USA	Mia Gyau	8	0	6	0	0	0	2	0	0	0
2022	29	DF	(United States) USA	Taylor Hansen	1	0	0	0	0	0	1	0	0	0
2025–	31	GK	(Bosnia and Herzegovina) BIH	DiDi Haračić	2	0	2	0	0	0	0	0	0	0
2025–	23	DF	(United States) USA	Nya Harrison	1	0	1	0	0	0	0	0	0	0
2023	3	FW	(United States) USA	Rachel Hill	23	0	17	0	1	0	5	0	0	0
2022–2024	10	FW	(Sweden) SWE	Sofia Jakobsson	59	4	45	4	3	0	9	0	2	0
2022	33	FW	(Mexico) MEX	Katie Johnson	19	0	15	0	0	0	4	0	0	0
2024–	18	FW	(Canada) CAN	Mya Jones	24	2	19	2	0	0	0	0	5	0
2022–2023	22	MF	(United States) USA	Taylor Kornieck	48	7	34	4	3	1	11	2	0	0
2024–2025	6	DF	(Sweden) SWE	Hanna Lundkvist	55	3	49	3	1	0	1	0	4	0
2025–	9	FW	(Canada) CAN	Adriana Leon	27	4	26	4	1	0	0	0	0	0
2024–2025	21	MF	(United States) USA	Savannah McCaskill	46	2	41	2	0	0	1	0	4	0
2022	19	DF	(United States) USA	Tegan McGrady	15	0	10	0	0	0	5	0	0	0
2025	34	DF	(United States) USA	Quincy McMahon	8	0	7	0	1	0	0	0	0	0
2022–	14	DF	(United States) USA	Kristen McNabb	99	7	82	6	4	0	6	0	7	1
2024	35	GK	(United States) USA	Morgan Messner	2	0	0	0	0	0	0	0	2	0
2022–2024	13	FW	(United States) USA	Alex Morgan	63	25	48	19	3	1	8	5	4	0
2024–	75	DF	(France) FRA	Perle Morroni	34	1	31	1	1	0	0	0	2	0
2025	8	FW	(Nigeria) NGA	Chiamaka Okwuchukwu	3	1	3	1	0	0	0	0	0	0
2022–2023	16	DF	(United States) USA	Madison Pogarch	31	1	22	1	3	0	6	0	0	0
2022	17	MF	(United States) USA	Sydney Pulver	1	0	1	0	0	0	0	0	0	0
2022–2023	18	DF	(United States) USA	Kaleigh Riehl	52	2	39	1	2	0	11	1	0	0
2022–2025	15	FW	(United States) USA	Makenzy Robbe	99	10	82	10	4	0	6	0	7	0
2024–2025	77, 7	FW	(Mexico) MEX	María Sánchez	41	9	34	4	0	0	0	0	7	5
2022	27	FW	(Germany) GER	Marleen Schimmer	14	0	9	0	0	0	5	0	0	0
2022–2024	11	FW	(United States) USA	Jaedyn Shaw	59	13	47	13	3	0	7	0	2	0
2022–2025	1	GK	(Canada) CAN	Kailen Sheridan	97	0	86	0	4	0	4	0	3	0
2023	34	DF	(United States) USA	Cheyenne Shorts	4	1	2	1	0	0	2	0	0	0
2022	9	FW	(England) ENG	Jodie Taylor	20	2	13	1	1	0	6	1	0	0
2022	21	GK	(England) ENG	Carly Telford	6	0	4	0	0	0	2	0	0	0
2024	16	DF	(Australia) AUS	Kaitlyn Torpey	17	1	14	0	0	0	1	0	2	1
2022–2023	6	MF	(United States) USA	Kelsey Turnbow	40	0	28	0	2	0	10	0	0	0
2022–2024	5	MF	(Australia) AUS	Emily van Egmond	70	2	58	1	3	1	5	0	4	0
2024–	12	DF	(United States) USA	Kennedy Wesley	39	3	35	2	1	0	0	0	3	1
2022–2024	20	DF	(United States) USA	Christen Westphal	80	0	59	0	3	0	12	0	6	0
2023	30	GK	(United States) USA	Shae Yáñez	9	0	4	0	0	0	5	0	0	0

== By nationality ==
In total, 63 players representing 13 different countries have appeared for San Diego Wave FC.

Note: Countries indicate national team as defined under FIFA eligibility rules. Players may hold more than one non-FIFA nationality.

Country	Total players
Australia	2
Bosnia and Herzegovina	1
Brazil	1
Canada	3
Colombia	1
England	2
France	4
Germany	2
Mexico	2
Nigeria	2
Republic of Ireland	1
Sweden	2
United States	40

== See also ==
- 2022 NWSL Expansion Draft
- List of top-division football clubs in CONCACAF countries
- List of professional sports teams in the United States and Canada
