= List of San Diego Wave FC records and statistics =

San Diego Wave FC is an American professional soccer team based in San Diego, California, that competes in the National Women's Soccer League (NWSL).

This is a list of franchise records from the team's inaugural NWSL season in 2022 to the present.

All stats accurate as of match played November 3, 2024.

== Honors ==
NWSL Shield: 1

- Winners: 2023

NWSL Challenge Cup: 1

- Winners: 2024

== Player records ==
As of match played November 9, 2025

=== Appearances ===
- Youngest first-team player: Melanie Barcenas – **15 years, 177 days** (against Orlando Pride, April 29, 2023)
- Oldest first-team player: Jodie Taylor – **36 years, 152 days** (against Chicago Red Stars, October 16, 2022)

==== Most appearances ====
Player					Appearances					
#	Name	Nat.	Pos.	Wave career	NWSL	Playoffs	Cup	Cont'l	Other	Total
1	**Kristen McNabb**	(United States)	DF	2022–	82	4	6	4	3	99
1	**Makenzy Robbe**	(United States)	FW	2022–	82	4	6	4	3	99
3	**Kailen Sheridan**	(United States)	GK	2022–	86	4	4	3	0	97
4	Christen Westphal	(United States)	DF	2022–2024	59	3	12	3	3	80
5	Naomi Girma	(United States)	DF	2022–2024	58	3	9	2	0	72
6	Emily van Egmond	(Australia)	MF	2022–2024	58	3	5	4	0	70
7	Amirah Ali	(United States)	FW	2022–2024	48	3	11	3	3	68
8	Alex Morgan	(United States)	FW	2022–2024	48	3	8	1	3	63
9	Sofia Jakobsson	(Sweden)	FW	2022–2024	45	3	9	1	1	59
9	Jaedyn Shaw	(United States)	FW	2022–2024	47	3	7	2	0	59

Bolded players are currently on the San Diego Wave FC roster.

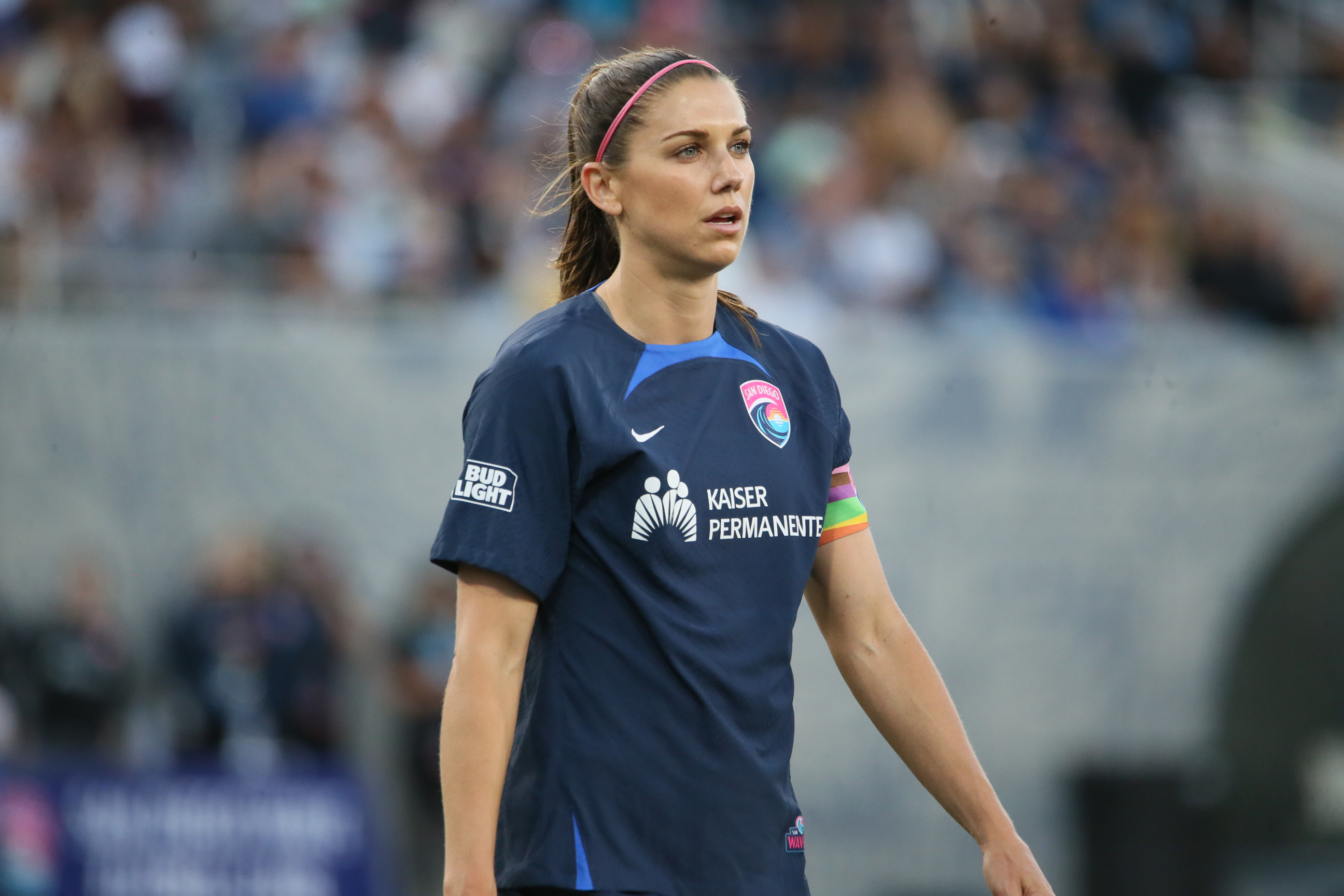
Alex Morgan is currently the Wave's all-time leading goalscorer.

=== Goals ===
- Youngest goalscorer: Melanie Barcenas – **16 years, 334 days** (against Portland Thorns FC, September 28, 2024)
- Oldest goalscorer: Jodie Taylor – **35 years, 349 days** (against Houston Dash, May 1, 2022)
- Inaugural goalscorer in all competitions: Kaleigh Riehl – **1st overall match** (against Angel City FC, March 19, 2022)
- Inaugural League goalscorer: Jodie Taylor – **1st League match** (against Houston Dash, May 1, 2022)
- Most goals in a season in all competitions: **16** – Alex Morgan, 2022
- Most League goals in a season: **12** – Alex Morgan, 2022
- Most goals scored in a match: **4** – Alex Morgan (against NJ/NY Gotham FC, May 7, 2022)
- Goals in consecutive league matches: **3 consecutive matches**

Dudinha, October 11, 2025 to November 2, 2025
Alex Morgan, August 20, 2022 to September 10, 2022

- Fastest goal: **0 minutes 27 seconds** – Amirah Ali (against Utah Royals, September 15, 2024)
- Latest goal (not AET): **90+8 minutes** – Emily van Egmond (against Seattle Reign FC, March 29, 2024)
- Latest goal (including AET): **110 minutes** – Alex Morgan (against Chicago Red Stars, October 16, 2022)

==== Overall goals ====
Player					Goals scored					
#	Name	Nat.	Pos.	Wave career	NWSL	Playoffs	Cup	Cont'l	Other	Total
1	Alex Morgan	(United States)	FW	2022–2024	19	1	5	0	0	25
2	Jaedyn Shaw	(United States)	FW	2022–2024	13	0	1	0	0	14
3	**Makenzy Robbe**	(United States)	FW	2022–	10	0	0	0	0	10
4	María Sánchez	(Mexico)	FW	2024–2025	4	0	0	4	1	9
5	Amirah Ali	(United States)	FW	2022–2024	5	0	1	1	1	8
6	**Delphine Cascarino**	(France)	FW	2024–	7	0	0	0	0	7
6	Taylor Kornieck	(United States)	MF	2022–2023	4	1	2	0	0	7
6	**Kristen McNabb**	(United States)	DF	2022–	6	0	0	1	0	7
9	**Kenza Dali**	(France)	MF	2025–	5	0	0	0	0	5
9	**Dudinha**	(Brazil)	FW	2025–	5	0	0	0	0	5

Bolded players are currently on the San Diego Wave FC roster.

=== Assists ===
- Most assists in a season in all competitions: **6** – Delphine Cascarino, 2025
- Most League assists in a season: **6** – Delphine Cascarino, 2025
- Most assists in a match: **2**

Emily van Egmond (against Washington Spirit, September 10, 2022)
Delphine Cascarino (against Racing Louisville FC, November 3, 2024)

==== Overall assists ====
Player					Assists					
#	Name	Nat.	Pos.	Wave career	NWSL	Playoffs	Cup	Cont'l	Other	Total
1	**Delphine Cascarino**	(France)	FW	2024–	9	0	0	1	0	10
1	Alex Morgan	(United States)	FW	2022–2024	8	1	1	0	0	10
3	María Sánchez	(Mexico)	FW	2024–2025	6	0	0	0	1	7
3	Christen Westphal	(United States)	DF	2022–2024	6	0	1	0	0	7
5	Sofia Jakobsson	(Sweden)	FW	2022–2024	4	1	0	0	0	5
5	**Hanna Lundkvist**	(Sweden)	DF	2024–	3	0	0	2	0	5
5	**Makenzy Robbe**	(United States)	FW	2022–	5	0	0	0	0	5
5	Jaedyn Shaw	(United States)	FW	2022–2024	4	0	1	0	0	5
9	Taylor Kornieck	(United States)	MF	2022–2023	3	0	1	0	0	4
9	**Perle Morroni**	(France)	DF	2024–	4	0	0	0	0	4
9	Kelsey Turnbow	(United States)	MF	2022–2023	3	0	1	0	0	4

Bolded players are currently on the San Diego Wave FC roster.

=== Goalkeeping ===
- Youngest goalkeeper: Morgan Messner – **24 years and 160 days** (against Club América, July 26, 2024)
- Oldest goalkeeper: Carly Telford – **35 years and 44 days** (against Houston Dash, August 20, 2022)

==== Most shutouts ====
Player					Shutouts					
#	Name	Nat.	Pos.	Wave career	NWSL	Playoffs	Cup	Cont'l	Other	Total
1	**Kailen Sheridan**	(Canada)	GK	2022–	26	0	2	0	1	**29**
2	Carly Telford	(England)	GK	2022	1	0	0	0	0	**1**
3	**Hillary Beall**	(United States)	GK	2024–	0	0	0	1	0	**1**
4	Morgan Messner	(United States)	GK	2024	0	0	0	0	1	**1**

Bolded players are currently on the San Diego Wave FC roster.

== Team records ==
As of match played November 3, 2024

=== Record wins ===
San Diego Wave FC score listed first

- Record NWSL regular season win: 4–0 vs NJ/NY Gotham FC, May 7, 2022
- Record playoff win: 2–1 vs Chicago Red Stars, October 16, 2022
- Record NWSL Challenge Cup win: 4–2 vs Angel City FC, March 30, 2022
- Record Summer Cup win: 3–1 vs Bay FC, July 20, 2024
- Record Champions Cup win:

2–0 vs Santa Fe FC, August 20, 2024
2–0 vs Whitecaps FC Girls Elite, October 1, 2024

- Record home win: 4–0 vs NJ/NY Gotham FC, May 7, 2022
- Record road win:

3–0 vs NJ/NY Gotham FC, June 19, 2022
3–0 vs Houston Dash, May 20, 2023

=== Record defeats ===
- Record NWSL regular season defeat:

0–3 vs Chicago Red Stars, June 28, 2024
1–4 vs North Carolina Courage, September 8, 2024
1–4 vs Kansas City Current, October 19, 2024

- Record playoff defeat:

1–2 vs Portland Thorns FC, October 23, 2022
0–1 vs OL Reign, November 5, 2023

- Record NWSL Challenge Cup defeat:

0–3 vs OL Reign, May 31, 2023
1–4 vs Portland Thorns FC, April 19, 2023

- Record Summer Cup defeat: 0–2 vs Club América, July 26, 2024
- Record Champions Cup defeat: 0–1 vs Club América, October 16, 2024
- Record home defeat:

0–3 vs Chicago Red Stars, June 28, 2024
1–4 vs North Carolina Courage, September 8, 2024

- Record road defeat: 1–4 vs Kansas City Current, October 19, 2024

=== Highest scores ===
San Diego Wave FC score listed first

- Highest scoring NWSL regular season game: 7 goals

3–4 vs Washington Spirit, September 10, 2022

- Highest scoring playoff game: 3 goals

2–1 vs Chicago Red Stars, October 16, 2022
1–2 vs Portland Thorns FC, October 23, 2022

- Highest scoring NWSL Challenge Cup game: 6 goals

4–2 vs Angel City FC, March 30, 2022

- Highest scoring Summer Cup game: 4 goals

3–1 vs Bay FC, July 20, 2024

- Highest scoring Champions Cup game: 5 goals

3–2 vs Portland Thorns FC, September 18, 2024

- Highest scoring home game: 5 goals

3–2 vs Chicago Red Stars, March 25, 2023
1–4 vs North Carolina Courage, September 8, 2024
1–4 vs Kansas City Current, October 19, 2024

- Highest scoring road game: 7 goals

3–4 vs Washington Spirit, September 10, 2022

=== Streaks ===
- Longest unbeaten run (competitive matches): 5 matches

June 4, 2022, to July 9, 2022
May 14, 2023, to June 17, 2023

- Longest unbeaten run (NWSL regular season): 5 matches

June 4, 2022, to July 9, 2022
May 14, 2023, to June 17, 2023

- Longest winning streak (competitive matches): 3 matches

May 1, 2022, to May 18, 2022
August 19, 2023, to September 16, 2023

- Longest winning streak (NWSL regular season): 3 matches

May 1, 2022, to May 18, 2022
August 19, 2023, to September 16, 2023

- Longest tying streak (competitive matches): 3 matches

June 4, 2022, to June 19, 2022
May 23, 2024, to June 19, 202

- Longest tying streak (NWSL regular season): 3 matches

June 4, 2022, to June 19, 2022
May 23, 2024, to June 19, 2024

- Longest losing streak (competitive matches): 4 matches

May 31, 2023, to August 5, 2023
October 5, 2024, to November 3, 2024

- Longest losing streak (NWSL regular season): 3 matches

June 17, 2023, to July 8, 2023
June 28, 2024, to September 1, 2024
October 5, 2024, to November 3, 2024

- Longest streak without a win (competitive matches): 9 matches, May 12, 2024, to July 20, 2024
- Longest streak without a win (NWSL regular season): 12 matches, May 12, 2024, to September 14, 2024
- Longest scoring run (competitive matches): 7 matches, March 30, 2022, to May 18, 2022
- Longest scoring run (NWSL regular season): 7 matches, April 23, 2023, to June 9, 2023
- Longest scoreless run (competitive matches): 3 matches, June 22, 2024, to July 20, 2024
- Longest scoreless run (NWSL regular season): 3 matches, June 22, 2024, to August 24, 2024
- Longest streak without conceding a goal (competitive matches): 3 matches, September 30, 2023, to March 23, 2024
- Longest streak without conceding a goal (NWSL regular season): 3 matches, September 30, 2023, to March 23, 2024
- Longest streak without a shutout (competitive matches): 6 matches, August 24, 2024, to September 21, 2024
- Longest streak without a shutout (NWSL regular season): 7 matches, June 28, 2024, to September 21, 2024

== Coaching records ==
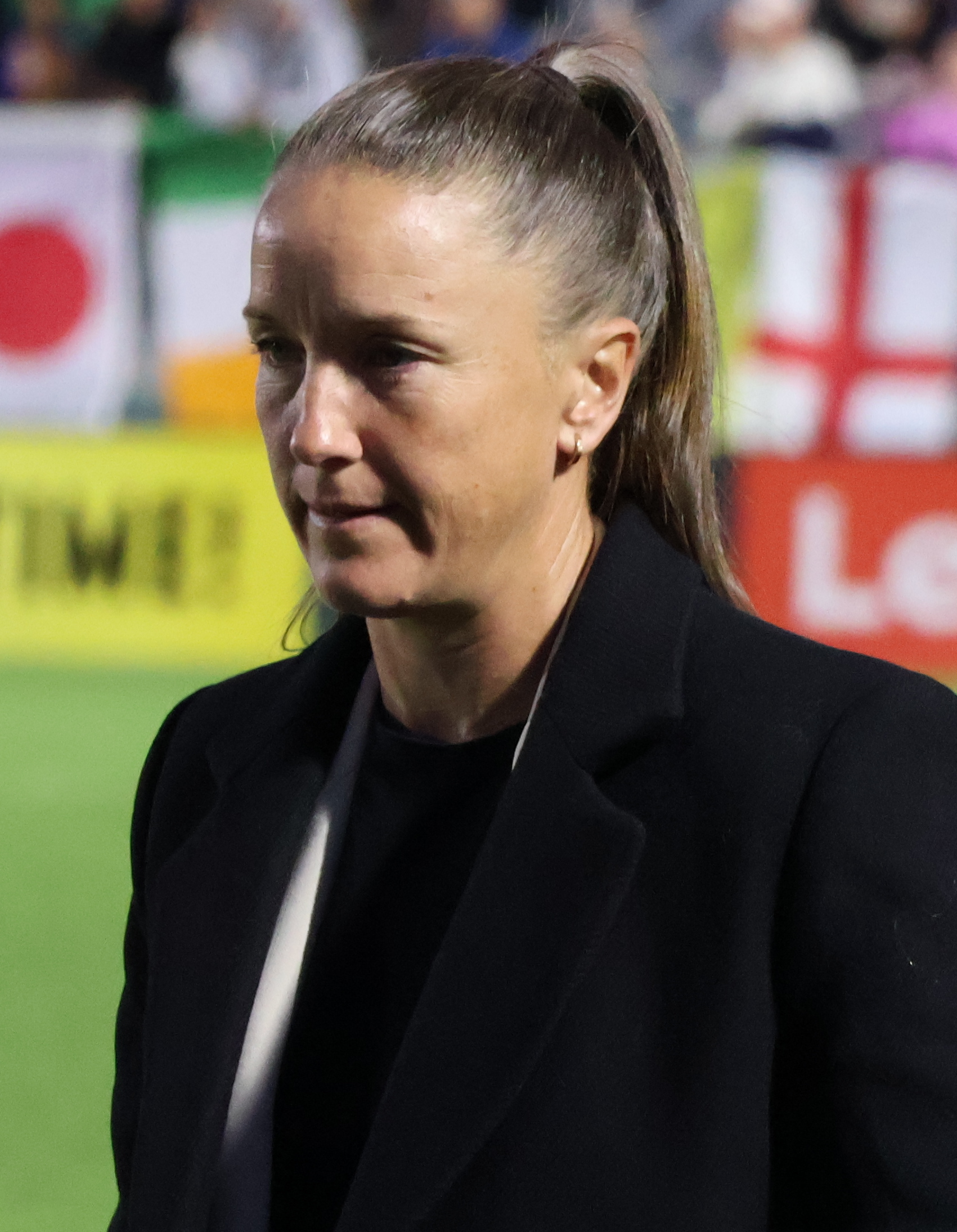
Casey Stoney is the longest-serving Wave head coach.

As of February 20, 2025

- First head coach: Casey Stoney – Stoney was announced as the Wave's first head coach prior to the team's inaugural NWSL season.
- Longest-serving head coach: Casey Stoney – 2 years, 346 days (125 matches) (July 14, 2021, to June 24, 2024)

All-time San Diego Wave FC coaching stats
Name	Nationality	From	To	W	D	L	GF	GA	GD	Win%
Casey Stoney	England	July 14, 2021	June 24, 2024	65	32	28	94	82	+12	52
Paul Buckle (interim)	England	June 24, 2024	August 15, 2024	0	0	2	0	4	-4	0
Landon Donovan (interim)	United States	August 16, 2024	November 18, 2024	3	1	6	12	18	-6	30
Jonas Eidevall	Sweden	January 7, 2025	present	0	0	0	0	0	0	0

== List of seasons ==
As of August 28, 2025

Seasonal statistics for San Diego Wave FC
Season	Regular season								Playoffs	Challenge Cup	Summer Cup	Champions Cup	Top Scorer	Avg. attendance
Season	P	W	D	L	GF	GA	Pts	Pos	Playoffs	Challenge Cup	Summer Cup	Champions Cup	Top Scorer	Avg. attendance
2022	22	10	6	6	32	21	36	3rd	Semi-finals	Group stage	Not held	Not held	(United States) Alex Morgan (12)	8,729
2023	22	11	4	7	31	22	37	1st	Semi-finals	Group stage	Not held	Not held	(United States) Alex Morgan (6)	20,718
2024	26	6	7	13	25	35	25	10th	DNQ	Champions	Group stage	Group stage	(United States) Jaedyn Shaw (4)	19,575
2025	17	8	5	4	28	19	29	3rd	TBD	TBD	TBD	TBD	TBD	TBD

== Individual honors ==
As of February 22, 2025

NWSL Player of the Month

Month	Player	Ref
May 2022	(United States) Alex Morgan	

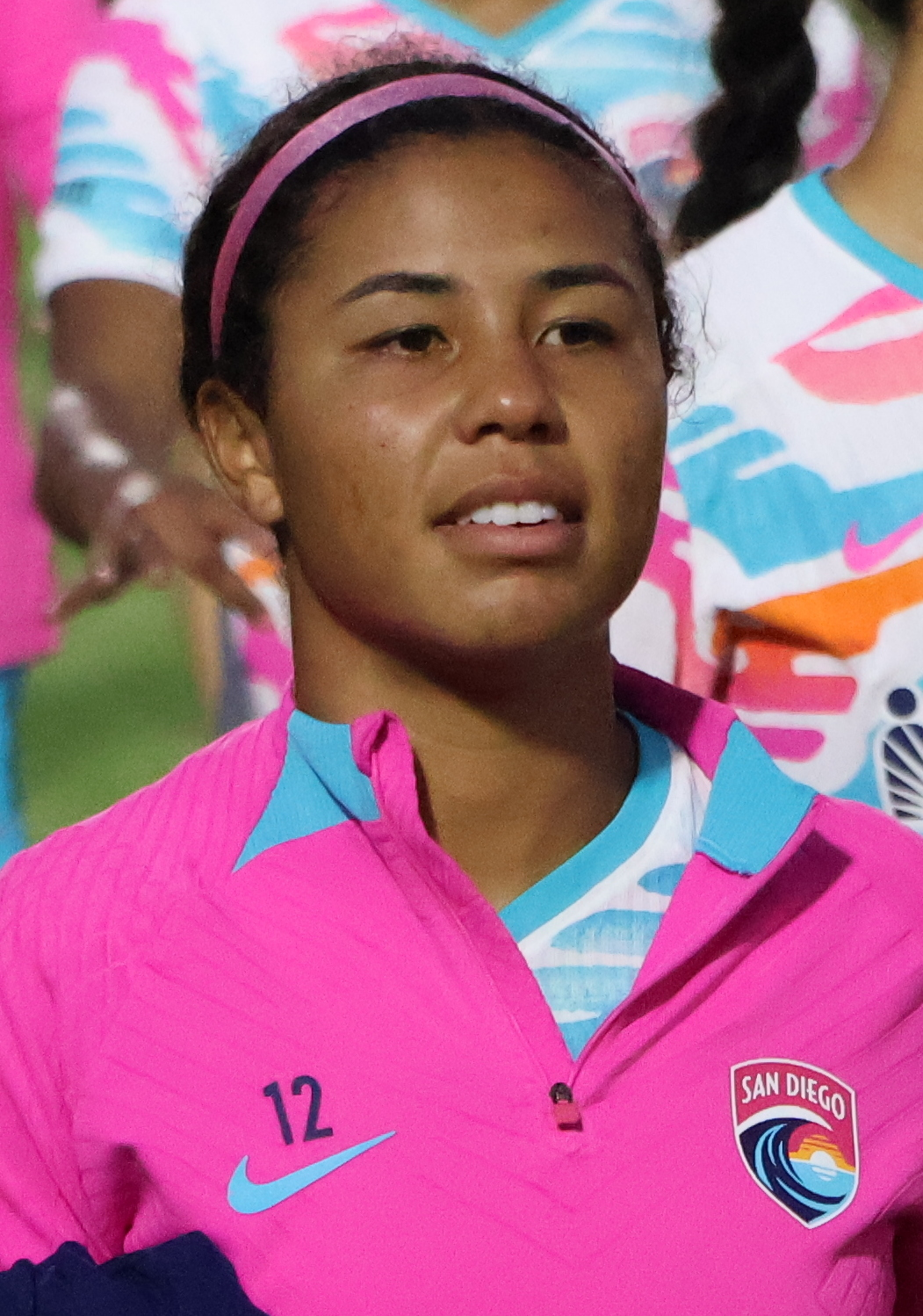
Kennedy Wesley won the September 2024 NWSL Rookie of the Month award.

NWSL Rookie of the Month

Month	Player	Ref
May 2022	(United States) Naomi Girma	
September/October 2022	(United States) Naomi Girma (2)	
September 2024	(United States) Kennedy Wesley	

NWSL Best XI

Year	Position	Player	Ref
2022	Goalkeeper	(Canada) Kailen Sheridan	
2022	Defender	(United States) Naomi Girma	
2022	Forward	(United States) Alex Morgan	
2023	Defender	(United States) Naomi Girma (2)	
2023	Midfielder	(United States) Jaedyn Shaw	

NWSL Second XI

Year	Position	Player	Ref
2023	Goalkeeper	(Canada) Kailen Sheridan	
2023	Forward	(United States) Alex Morgan	
2024	Defender	(United States) Naomi Girma	

NWSL Golden Boot

Year	Player	Ref
2022	(United States) Alex Morgan	

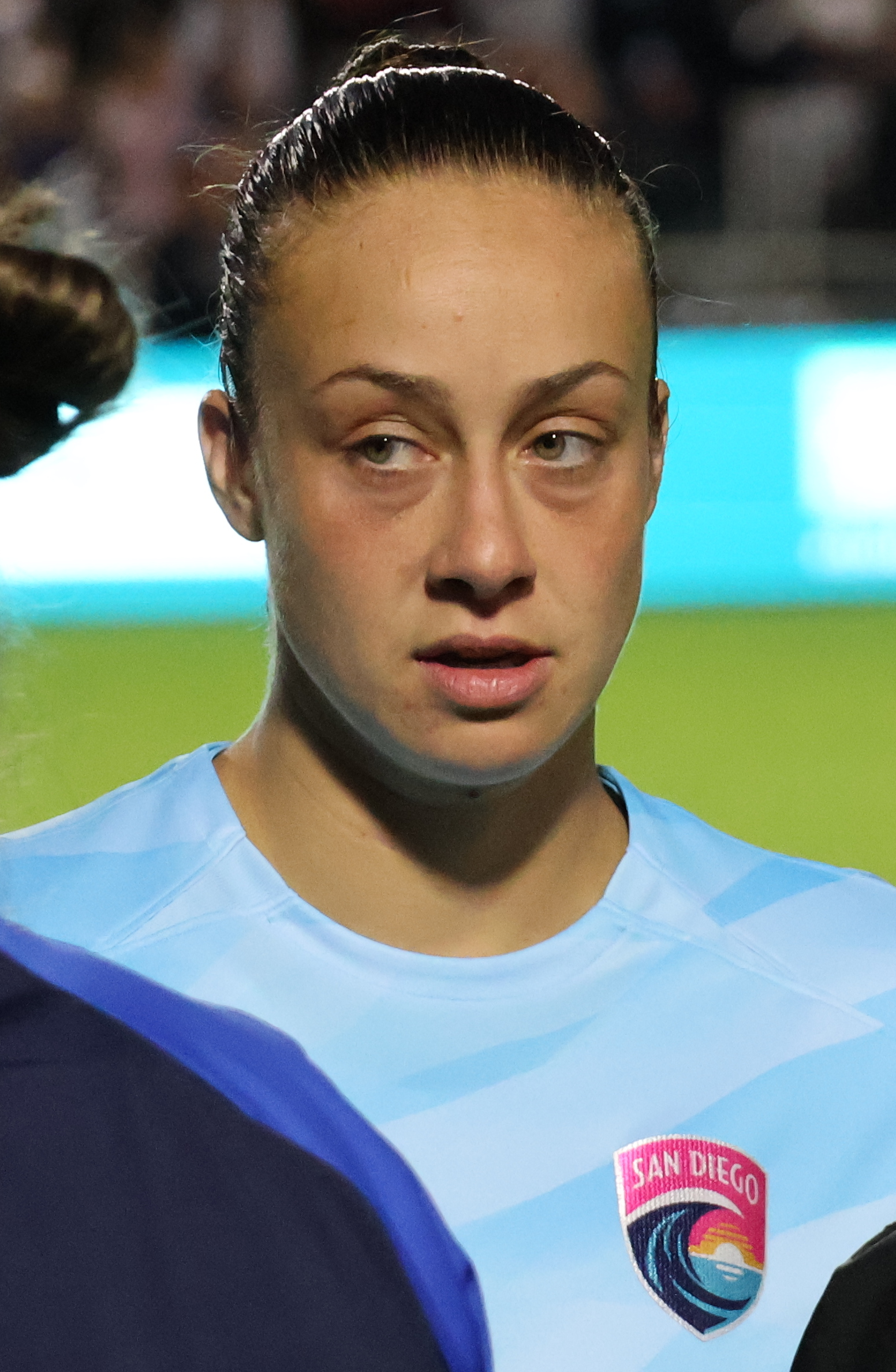
Kailen Sheridan was named the 2022 NWSL Goalkeeper of the Year.

NWSL Defender of the Year

Year	Player	Ref
2022	(United States) Naomi Girma	
2023	(United States) Naomi Girma (2)	

NWSL Goalkeeper of the Year

Year	Player	Ref
2022	(Canada) Kailen Sheridan	

NWSL Rookie of the Year

Year	Player	Ref
2022	(United States) Naomi Girma	

NWSL Coach of the Year

Year	Player	Ref
2022	(England) Casey Stoney	

FIFPro Women's World 11

The following players were named to the FIFPro Women's World 11 while playing for San Diego Wave FC:

- (United States) Alex Morgan (2) – 2022, 2023

== Internationals ==
As of December 31, 2024

=== Caps ===
Below is a list of players capped internationally while with San Diego Wave FC and the number of caps they earned during that time. The list is ordered by date of first international appearance while contracted with the San Diego Wave. A total of 13 players have represented 7 different senior national teams during their Wave tenure.

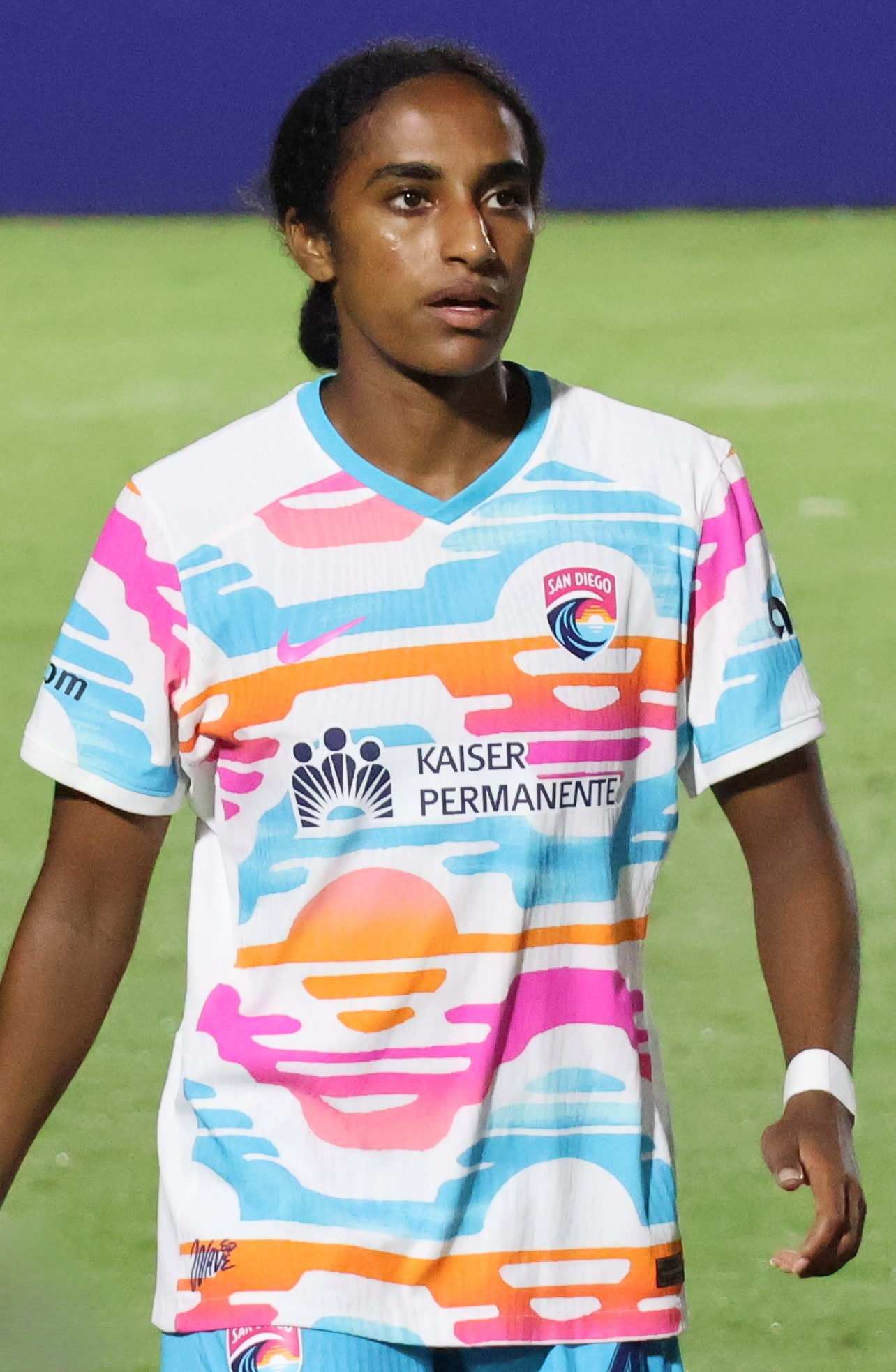
Naomi Girma has made the most international appearances of any player while with San Diego Wave FC.

Note: Countries indicate national team as defined under FIFA eligibility rules. Players may hold more than one non-FIFA nationality.

Debuted while with San Diego

Player	Nation	Years	Caps
Emily van Egmond	Australia	2022–2024	43
**Kailen Sheridan**	Canada	2022–present	40
Sofia Jakobsson	Sweden	2022–2024	23
Abby Dahlkemper	United States	2022–2024	7
Naomi Girma	United States	2022–2024	44
Taylor Kornieck	United States	2022–2023	12
Alex Morgan	United States	2022–2024	34
**Kyra Carusa**	Republic of Ireland	2023–present	16
Jaedyn Shaw	United States	2022–2024	21
**Kaitlyn Torpey**	Australia	2024–present	10
**Hanna Lundkvist**	Sweden	2024–present	9
**María Sánchez**	Mexico	2024–present	5
**Delphine Cascarino**	France	2024–present	7

Bolded players are currently on the San Diego Wave FC roster.

=== Honors ===
Below is a list of major international honors won by players while with San Diego Wave FC.

Olympic Games

The following players have won the Olympic gold medal while playing for San Diego Wave FC:

- (United States) Naomi Girma – 2024
- (United States) Jaedyn Shaw – 2024

== NWSL Draft picks ==
Below is a list of players San Diego Wave FC has selected in an NWSL Draft. A total of 10 players were drafted by the Wave prior to the draft's termination before the 2025 season.

All-time San Diego Wave FC NWSL Draft picks
Draft	Round	Selection	Player	Position	College team
2022	1	1	(United States) Naomi Girma	DF	(California) Stanford Cardinal
2022	1	9	(Germany) Marleen Schimmer	FW	(Arizona) Grand Canyon Antelopes
2022	2	25	(United States) Sydney Pulver	MF	(Washington (state)) Washington State Cougars
2022	3	27	(United States) Belle Briede	MF	(California) Stanford Cardinal
2022	4	40	(United States) Kayla Bruster	DF	(Georgia (U.S. state)) Georgia Bulldogs
2023	2	13	(United States) Sierra Enge	MF	(California) Stanford Cardinal
2023	3	33	(Hungary) Lauren Brzykcy	GK	(California) UCLA Bruins
2023	4	45	(United States) Giovanna DeMarco	MF	(North Carolina) Wake Forest Demon Deacons
2024	1	12	**(United States) Kennedy Wesley**	DF	(California) Stanford Cardinal
2024	3	42	(Canada) **Mya Jones**	FW	(Tennessee) Memphis Tigers

Bolded players are currently on the San Diego Wave FC roster.

== Record by opponent ==
As of match played November 3, 2024

=== National Women's Soccer League ===
==== Regular season ====
San Diego Wave FC league record by opponent
Opponent	P	W	D	L	P	W	D	L	P	W	D	L	GF	GA	Win%	First
Opponent	Home				Away				Total						Win%	First
Angel City FC	3	1	0	2	3	1	1	1	6	2	1	3	6	6	33.33	July 9, 2022
Bay FC	1	1	0	0	1	0	0	1	2	1	0	1	3	3	50.00	April 27, 2024
Chicago Stars FC	3	2	0	1	3	1	0	2	6	3	0	3	6	8	50.00	May 15, 2022
Houston Dash	3	2	0	1	3	2	1	0	6	4	1	1	8	3	66.67	May 1, 2022
Kansas City Current	3	0	0	3	3	1	1	1	6	1	1	4	8	12	16.67	June 4, 2022
NJ/NY Gotham FC	3	2	1	0	3	2	0	1	6	4	1	1	12	4	66.67	May 7, 2022
North Carolina Courage	3	1	1	1	3	1	1	1	6	2	2	2	6	7	33.33	May 22, 2022
Orlando Pride	3	0	1	2	3	1	1	1	6	1	3	2	6	9	16.67	August 13, 2022
Portland Thorns FC	3	1	2	0	3	2	0	1	6	3	2	1	9	4	50.00	June 8, 2022
Racing Louisville FC	3	2	1	0	3	0	2	1	6	2	3	1	5	2	33.33	July 15, 2022
Seattle Reign FC	3	1	1	1	3	0	0	3	6	1	1	4	4	7	16.67	May 29, 2022
Utah Royals	1	1	0	0	1	1	0	0	2	2	0	0	4	1	100.00	May 8, 2024
Washington Spirit	3	1	2	0	3	0	1	2	6	1	3	2	10	12	16.67	July 3, 2022
Total	35	15	9	11	35	12	8	15	70	27	17	26	87	78	42.31	

==== Playoffs ====
The Wave advanced to the playoffs in their inaugural season after the team had finished the regular season in third-place. Their most recent playoff appearance was in 2023. The Wave have never advanced beyond the semifinals of the competition.

San Diego Wave FC playoff record by opponent
Opponent	P	W	D	L	P	W	D	L	P	W	D	L	P	W	D	L	GF	GA	Win%	First
Opponent	Home				Away				Neutral				Total						Win%	First
Chicago Stars FC	1	1	0	0	0	0	0	0	0	0	0	0	1	1	0	0	2	1	100.00	October 16, 2022
Portland Thorns FC	0	0	0	0	1	0	0	1	0	0	0	0	1	0	0	1	1	2	0.00	October 23, 2022
Seattle Reign FC	1	0	0	1	0	0	0	0	0	0	0	0	1	0	0	1	0	1	0.00	November 5, 2023
Total	2	1	0	1	1	0	0	1	0	0	0	0	3	1	0	2	3	3	33.33	

=== NWSL Challenge Cup ===
The Wave participated NWSL Challenge Cup in their first two seasons of existence. Both iterations of the competition featured six games and a knockout stage. Ahead of the 2024 season, the competition moved from a league cup format to a single-game super cup. As the 2023 NWSL Shield winners, the Wave qualified for the first super cup version of the Challenge Cup, in which they faced off against 2023 NWSL champions NJ/NY Gotham FC.

San Diego Wave FC cup record by opponent
Opponent	P	W	D	L	P	W	D	L	P	W	D	L	GF	GA	Win%	First
Opponent	Home				Away				Total						Win%	First
Angel City FC	2	1	1	0	2	0	1	1	4	1	2	1	7	6	25.00	March 19, 2022
NJ/NY Gotham FC	0	0	0	0	1	1	0	0	1	1	0	0	1	0	100.00	March 15, 2024
Portland Thorns FC	2	1	0	1	2	0	0	2	4	1	0	3	4	8	25.00	March 26, 2022
Seattle Reign FC	2	0	1	1	2	0	0	2	4	0	1	3	2	8	0.00	April 14, 2022
Total	6	2	2	2	7	1	1	5	13	3	3	7	14	22	37.50	

=== Summer Cup ===
In 2024, NWSL and Liga MX Femenil combined for a new tournament, the NWSL x Liga MX Femenil Summer Cup. All 14 NWSL clubs and six Liga MX club entered a group stage before a knockout round.

San Diego Wave FC cup record by opponent
Opponent	P	W	D	L	P	W	D	L	P	W	D	L	GF	GA	Win%	First
Opponent	Home				Away				Total						Win%	First
(United States) Angel City FC	0	0	0	0	1	0	1	0	1	0	1	0	0	0	0.00	August 1, 2024
(United States) Bay FC	1	1	0	0	0	0	0	0	1	1	0	0	3	1	100.00	July 20, 2024
(Mexico) Club América	1	0	0	1	0	0	0	0	1	0	0	1	0	2	0.00	July 26, 2024
Total	2	1	0	1	1	0	1	0	3	1	1	1	3	3	33.33	

=== Continental ===
In 2024, the Wave participated in the first season of the CONCACAF W Champions Cup, qualifying as the 2023 NWSL Shield winners.

San Diego Wave FC continental record by opponent
Opponent	P	W	D	L	P	W	D	L	P	W	D	L	GF	GA	Win%	First
Opponent	Home				Away				Total						Win%	First
(Mexico) Club América	1	0	0	1	0	0	0	0	1	0	0	1	0	1	0.00	October 16, 2024
(United States) Portland Thorns FC	1	1	0	0	0	0	0	0	1	1	0	0	3	2	100.00	September 18, 2024
(Panama) Santa Fe FC	0	0	0	0	1	1	0	0	1	1	0	0	2	0	100.00	August 20, 2024
(Canada) Whitecaps FC Girls Elite	0	0	0	0	1	1	0	0	1	1	0	0	2	0	100.00	October 1, 2024
Total	2	1	0	1	2	2	0	0	4	3	0	1	7	3	75.00	
