= 2022 San Diego Wave FC season =

San Diego Wave FC 2022 soccer season

San Diego Wave FC
2022 season
- Owner: Ron Burkle
- President: Jill Ellis
- Head Coach: Casey Stoney
- Stadium: Torero Stadium (until Sept. 17, 2022); Snapdragon Stadium (from Sept. 17, 2022)
- NWSL: 3rd
- Challenge Cup: 3rd in West Division
- Playoffs: Semi-finals
- Top goalscorer: League: Alex Morgan (12); All: Alex Morgan (16)
- Highest home attendance: 32,000 (vs. ANG, Sep. 17)
- Lowest home attendance: 4,418 (vs. ORL, Aug. 13)
- Average home league attendance: 8,729
- Biggest win: 4–0 (May 7 vs. NJ/NY)
- Biggest defeat: 0–1 (3 times)
Home colors	Away colors
- All statistics correct as of October 23, 2022.

The 2022 San Diego Wave FC season was the inaugural season for San Diego Wave FC, a professional women's soccer team based in San Diego, California, that competes in the National Women's Soccer League (NWSL).

== Background ==
In January 2021, Lisa Baird, commissioner of the National Women's Soccer League, announced that an expansion team in Sacramento, California, led by Pittsburgh Penguins owner Ron Burkle and in conjunction with Sacramento Republic FC's expansion bid into Major League Soccer, would join the NWSL in 2022. However, Burkle never confirmed the news publicly before exiting the Sacramento Republic's ownership group. Instead, on June 8, 2021, the NWSL announced San Diego as the location for an expansion team owned by Burkle to begin play in 2022. Burkle named co-investor Matt Alvarez as his representative in the NWSL project.

The club hired former United States women's national soccer team coach Jill Ellis, who had retired from coaching after winning her second, and the United States's fourth, FIFA Women's World Cup championship. Ellis said Burkle had sought her advice about NWSL expansion in 2021. Ellis relocated from Miami, Florida, to San Diego for the job, and described her involvement in soccer matters at the club as "minimal"; she said most of her time was spent on club business and operations. By April 1, 2021, the club had hired 45 employees.

On July 12, 2021, the Wave announced Ellis's hiring of Molly Downtain, a former United States women's national team administrator who worked with Ellis from 2015 to 2019, as general manager.

On July 14, 2021, Ellis announced the hiring of former England women's national football team captain and Manchester United W.F.C. manager Casey Stoney as the Wave's first head coach. Stoney subsequently hired Rich Gunney from Portland Thorns FC and Victoria Boardman from Beach FC as assistants familiar with the NWSL and collegiate talent. Stoney had also been named Manchester United's first manager for the women's side, making the Wave the second club with no prior roster or staff that she had managed; she led United to a 52–19–6 record as manager from 2018 to 2021, including the FA Women's Championship title and promotion to the Women's Super League in 2019. Stoney cited the building process as part of her motivation to join the Wave, and noted that the Wave was a standalone organization, not a smaller division of a men's side as United had been. Visa issues required Stoney to leave her partner and children in England for the job.

The team revealed its crest and colors on December 15, 2021.

== Stadium ==
The team began play at 6,000-capacity Torero Stadium, on the campus of the University of San Diego, for the 2022 NWSL Challenge Cup and the first nine home matches of the 2022 National Women's Soccer League season. Torero also served as the venue for the previous professional women's soccer team in San Diego, the San Diego Spirit of the Women's United Soccer Association, from 2001 to 2003. The team scheduled its last two regular season home matches at Snapdragon Stadium, which opened in September 2022 in the Mission Valley campus extension of San Diego State University, and announced in December 2021 that Snapdragon Stadium would become the club's permanent home.

The Wave train at Surf Sports Park in Del Mar, California. Neighbors of the park commented in public meetings with concerns about the Wave's training as a sign of overcommitment of public space to sports usage, including traffic, dust, noise, and signage complaints.

== Team ==
=== Squad ===
As of August 2, 2022.

No.	Pos.	Nation	Player
1	GK	CAN	Kailen Sheridan
2	DF	USA	Abby Dahlkemper
4	DF	USA	Naomi Girma
5	MF	AUS	Emily van Egmond
6	MF	USA	Kelsey Turnbow
7	FW	USA	Amirah Ali
9	FW	ENG	Jodie Taylor
10	FW	SWE	Sofia Jakobsson
11	FW	USA	Jaedyn Shaw
13	FW	USA	Alex Morgan
14	MF	USA	Kristen McNabb
15	FW	USA	Makenzy Doniak
16	DF	USA	Madison Pogarch
17	MF	USA	Sydney Pulver
18	DF	USA	Kaleigh Riehl
20	DF	USA	Christen Westphal
21	GK	ENG	Carly Telford
22	MF	USA	Taylor Kornieck
23	MF	USA	Belle Briede
24	FW	USA	Sarah Sodoma
25	DF	USA	Kayla Bruster
26	DF	USA	Mia Gyau
27	FW	GER	Marleen Schimmer
29	DF	USA	Taylor Hansen
31	GK	USA	Melissa Lowder
33	FW	MEX	Katie Johnson
35	MF	USA	Jackie Altschuld
37	DF	USA	Sydney Cummings

== Competitions ==
=== Regular season ===
The Wave opened their first regular season with a 1–0 road win over Houston Dash, with Jodie Taylor scoring the club's first regular-season goal in the 87th minute. The Dash's coach and general manager, James Clarkson, had been suspended prior to the match pending league and team investigations into complaints of discrimination and harassment, making Stoney the NWSL's manager with the longest uninterrupted tenure prior to her first match as San Diego's manager. The Wave's regular season home opener on May 7, 2022, at Torero Stadium was a 4–0 win over NJ/NY Gotham FC, with the venue sold out of 5,000 tickets. Wave FC's Snapdragon Stadium opener on September 17, a 1–0 win over Angel City FC, was a sellout of 32,000, setting a new NWSL single-game attendance record.

May 1 1	Houston Dash	0–1	San Diego Wave FC	Houston, Texas
4:00 pm	Groom (yellow card) 90+4'	Report	van Egmond (yellow card) 45+1'; Taylor 86' (Johnson)	Stadium: PNC Stadium; Attendance: 7,722; Referee: Anya Voigt

May 7 2	San Diego Wave FC	4–0	NJ/NY Gotham FC	San Diego, California
7:00 pm	Morgan 45+1' (pen.), 66' (pen.), 70', 90+1'	Report	Dydasco (yellow card) 45+6'; Jean (yellow card) 88'	Stadium: Torero Stadium; Attendance: 5,000; Referee: Alexandra Billeter

May 15 3	San Diego Wave FC	2–1	Chicago Red Stars	San Diego, California
2:00 pm	Morgan 56' (pen.); Riehl 89' (Turnbow); Taylor (yellow card) 61'; Sheridan (yellow card) 90'	Report	Sharples (yellow card) 55'; Cook 90+1' (Nagasato)	Stadium: Torero Stadium; Attendance: 5,000; Referee: Karen Callado

May 18 4	Racing Louisville FC	1–0	San Diego Wave FC	Louisville, Kentucky
4:30 pm	Milliet (yellow card) 14'; DeMelo 27'; Simon (yellow card) 89'	Report	Gyau (yellow card) 36'; Turnbow (yellow card) 44'	Stadium: Lynn Family Stadium; Attendance: 5,302; Referee: Joshua Encarnacion

May 22 5	North Carolina Courage	0–1	San Diego Wave FC	Cary, North Carolina
11:00 am	Kurtz (yellow card) 90+2'	Report	Morgan 41' (Kornieck); van Egmond (yellow card) 49'; Riehl (yellow card) 75'	Stadium: Sahlen's Stadium; Attendance: 6,070; Referee: Alyssa Nichols

May 29 6	OL Reign	1–0	San Diego Wave FC	Seattle, Washington
12:00 pm	Hiatt (yellow card) 24'; Lavelle 75' (Huerta)	Report	McGrady (yellow card) 71'	Stadium: Lumen Field; Attendance: 5,712; Referee: Brandon Stevis

June 4 7	Kansas City Current	2–2	San Diego Wave FC	Kansas City, Kansas
5:30 pm	Hamilton 11' (LaBonta); Bennett 63' (Loera)	Report	Morgan 37', 90' (Jakobsson); Kornieck (yellow card) 45+3'	Stadium: Children's Mercy Park; Attendance: 7,954; Referee: Kevin Broadley

June 8 8	San Diego Wave FC	2–2	Portland Thorns FC	San Diego, California
7:00 pm	Kornieck 81' (Ali), 88' (Westphal)	Report	Smith 22' (pen.); Sinclair 46' (Coffey); Rodríguez (yellow card) 70'; Pogarch (yellow card) 85'	Stadium: Torero Stadium; Attendance: 6,100; Referee: Mark Allatin

June 12 9	San Diego Wave FC	1–1	OL Reign	San Diego, California
2:00 pm	Morgan 8' (Sheridan)	Report	Fishlock 38' (Lavelle)	Stadium: Torero Stadium; Attendance: 5,000; Referee: Calin Radosav

June 19 10	NJ/NY Gotham FC	0–3	San Diego Wave FC	Harrison, New Jersey
1:00 pm	Mewis (yellow card) 44'	Report	Morgan 19' (Kornieck), 43' (Jakobsson); McNabb (yellow card) 31'; Doniak 68' (Morgan); Taylor (yellow card) 82'; van Egmond (yellow card) 86'; Schimmer (yellow card) 88'	Stadium: Red Bull Arena; Attendance: 7,145; Referee: Alyssa Nichols

July 3 11	San Diego Wave FC	2–1	Washington Spirit	San Diego, California
2:00 pm	Doniak 36' (Westphal); Briede 45+4' (Schimmer)	Report	Alexander (yellow card) 90+2'; Baggett 90+3' (McKeown)	Stadium: Torero Stadium; Attendance: 6,000; Referee: Samantha Martinez

July 9 12	Angel City FC	2–1	San Diego Wave FC	Los Angeles, California
7:30 pm	Riley 9' (Endo); Lussi (yellow card) 22' (yellow-red card) 79'; Nielsen (yellow card) 75'; Emslie 81' (Roccaro)	Report	McNabb 59' (Johnson)	Stadium: Banc of California Stadium; Attendance: 22,000; Referee: Brad Jensen

July 15 13	San Diego Wave FC	0–0	Racing Louisville FC	San Diego, California
7:00 pm	Riehl (yellow card) 80'	Report	Wyne (yellow card) 40'; Howell (yellow card) 48'	Stadium: Torero Stadium; Attendance: 4,747; Referee: Karen Callado

July 30 14	Chicago Red Stars	0–1	San Diego Wave FC	Chicago, Illinois
5:00 pm		Report	Dahlkemper (yellow card) 13' (yellow-red card) 59'; Girma (yellow card) 22'; Shaw 27' (Johnson); Briede (yellow card) 84'	Stadium: Soldier Field; Attendance: 23,951; Referee: Danielle Chesky

August 7 15	San Diego Wave FC	1–2	Kansas City Current	San Diego, California
2:00 pm	Sheridan (yellow card) 67'; Ali 88' (Doniak)	Report	Pickett (yellow card) 26'; Kizer 27' (Hamilton); Ball (yellow card) 33'; Mace 39'	Stadium: Torero Stadium; Attendance: 4,471; Referee: Samantha Martinez

August 13 16	San Diego Wave FC	0–1	Orlando Pride	San Diego, California
7:30 pm	Stoney (yellow card) 84'; Sheridan (red card) ^{post-match}	Report	Dougherty Howard 23' (pen.); McLeod (yellow card) 90+2'	Stadium: Torero Stadium; Attendance: 4,418; Referee: Adorae Monroy

August 20 17	San Diego Wave FC	3–1	Houston Dash	San Diego, California
7:00 pm	Morgan 13'; Kornieck (yellow card) 53'; Ali 67' (Morgan); Jakobsson 90' (Doniak)	Report	Salmon 7' (Jacobs)	Stadium: Torero Stadium; Attendance: 5,281; Referee: Brad Jensen

August 27 18	Portland Thorns FC	0–2	San Diego Wave FC	Portland, Oregon
7:30 pm		Report	McNabb 17' (Morgan); Morgan 42' (Kornieck); Kornieck (yellow card) 74'; Sheridan (yellow card) 85'	Stadium: Providence Park; Attendance: 18,624; Referee: Kelsey Harms

September 10 19	Washington Spirit	4–3	San Diego Wave FC	Buzzard Point, Washington D.C.
1:00 pm	McKeown 11' (Sanchez); Heilferty (yellow card) 13'; Brooks 30', 44' (Staab), (yellow card) 55'; Sanchez (yellow card) 45+5'; Hatch 90+10' (pen.)	Report	Shaw 7' (van Egmond); Morgan 57' (pen.), 82' (van Egmond); Riehl (yellow card) 63'; McNabb (yellow card) 77'	Stadium: Audi Field; Attendance: 10,158; Referee: Karen Callado

September 17 20	San Diego Wave FC	1–0	Angel City FC	San Diego, California
7:00 pm	Shaw 30' (Jakobsson); Turnbow (yellow card) 58'; van Egmond (yellow card) 82'	Report		Stadium: Snapdragon Stadium; Attendance: 32,000
Note: Rescheduled from 6:30 pm.

September 25 21	Orlando Pride	2–2	San Diego Wave FC	Orlando, Florida
4:00 pm	Dougherty Howard 33' (Pruitt); Jónsdóttir 68' (Petersen)	Report	Taylor (yellow card) 44'; Doniak 76' (Turnbow); Kornieck (yellow card) 77', (goal) 87'	Stadium: Exploria Stadium; Attendance: 6,466; Referee: Matt Thompson

September 30 22	San Diego Wave FC	0–0	North Carolina Courage	San Diego, California
7:00 pm	McNabb (yellow card) 15'	Report	Bench (yellow card) 90+3'	Stadium: Snapdragon Stadium; Attendance: 18,000; Referee: Elijio Arreguin
Note: Rescheduled from 6:30 pm.

==== Regular season standings ====
Pos	Team	Pld	W	D	L	GF	GA	GD	Pts	Qualification
1	OL Reign	22	11	7	4	32	19	+13	40	NWSL Shield, Playoffs – semi-finals
2	Portland Thorns FC (C)	22	10	9	3	49	24	+25	39	Playoffs – semi-finals
3	San Diego Wave FC	22	10	6	6	32	21	+11	36	Playoffs – first round
4	Houston Dash	22	10	6	6	35	27	+8	36	Playoffs – first round
5	Kansas City Current	22	10	6	6	29	29	0	36	Playoffs – first round
6	Chicago Red Stars	22	9	6	7	34	28	+6	33	Playoffs – first round
7	North Carolina Courage	22	9	5	8	46	33	+13	32	
8	Angel City FC	22	8	5	9	23	27	−4	29	
9	Racing Louisville FC	22	5	8	9	23	35	−12	23	
10	Orlando Pride	22	5	7	10	22	45	−23	22	
11	Washington Spirit	22	3	10	9	26	33	−7	19	
12	NJ/NY Gotham FC	22	4	1	17	16	46	−30	13	

Source: NWSL
Rules for classification: Tiebreakers
(C) Champions

==== Results summary ====
Overall								Home						Away					
Pld	W	D	L	GF	GA	GD	Pts	W	D	L	GF	GA	GD	W	D	L	GF	GA	GD
22	10	6	6	32	21	+11	36	5	3	2	16	9	+7	5	3	4	16	12	+4

Last updated: September 30, 2022.
Source: NWSLsoccer.com

==== Results by matchday ====
Matchday	1	2	3	4	5	6	7	8	9	10	11	12	13	14	15	16	17	18	19	20	21	22
Stadium	A	H	H	A	A	A	A	H	H	A	H	A	H	A	H	H	H	A	A	H	A	H
Result	W	W	W	L	W	L	D	D	D	W	W	L	D	W	L	L	W	W	L	W	D	D
Position (Note: SD's position at the end of the day on which their match was played.)	6	1	1	1	1	1	1	1	1	1	1	1	1	1	2	3	2	1	3	1	3	3

Updated to match(es) played on September 30, 2022. Source: NWSL
A = Away; H = Home; W = Win; D = Draw; L = Loss

=== Playoffs ===
October 16, 2022 Quarterfinal	San Diego Wave FC	2–1 (a.e.t.)	Chicago Red Stars	San Diego, California
19:00	van Egmond (yellow card) 31' (goal) 67'; Morgan 110' (Jakobsson); Westphal (yellow card) 117'	Report	Nagasato 10'	Stadium: Snapdragon Stadium; Attendance: 26,215; Referee: Mark Allatin

October 23, 2022 Semifinal	Portland Thorns FC	2–1	San Diego Wave FC	Portland, Oregon
14:00	Rodríguez 20'; Ryan (yellow card) 40'; Hubly (yellow card) 70'; Dunn 90+3'	Report	Kornieck 8' (Morgan); Riehl (yellow card) 19'	Stadium: Providence Park; Attendance: 22,035; Referee: Kevin Broadley

=== NWSL Challenge Cup ===
The Wave's first NWSL Challenge Cup ended in the group stage, with a West Division record of 1–3–2. The team conceded five goals within 15 minutes of the start of four of its matches. The club's first victory in any competition was on April 2, 2022, a 4–2 win against fellow Californian expansion team Angel City FC.

March 19 Group stage	Angel City FC	1–1	San Diego Wave FC	Fullerton, California
7:00 pm	McCaskill 49' (Riley); Roccaro (yellow card) 82'	Report	McNabb (yellow card) 45+4'; Turnbow (yellow card) 57'; McGrady (yellow card) 72'; Riehl 81' (Schimmer)	Stadium: Titan Stadium (Cal State Fullerton); Attendance: 6,307; Referee: Elvis Osmanovic

March 26 Group stage	San Diego Wave FC	0–1	Portland Thorns FC	San Diego, California
7:00 pm		Report	Smith 5' (Kuikka); Klingenberg (yellow card) 46'	Stadium: Torero Stadium; Attendance: 6,000; Referee: Luis Guardia

March 30 Group stage	San Diego Wave FC	4–2	Angel City FC	San Diego, California
1:00 pm	Taylor 19'; Morgan 45+3', 72' (Westphal); Ali 81' (Briede)	Report	McGrady 38' (o.g.); Press 59'	Stadium: Torero Stadium; Attendance: 5,158; Referee: Brad Jensen

April 14 Group stage	OL Reign	3–1	San Diego Wave FC	Seattle, Washington
10:00 pm	Stanton 2'; Balcer 8' (Van der Jagt); Hiatt 11'	Report	Morgan 24' (Kornieck)	Stadium: Lumen Field; Attendance: 4,803; Referee: Adorae Monroy

April 17 Group stage	Portland Thorns FC	3–2	San Diego Wave FC	Portland, Oregon
7:00 pm	Smith 4' (Weaver); Sugita 21', 41'	Report	McGrady (yellow card) 42'; Briede 46' (Morgan); Kornieck 61' (Turnbow); McNabb (yellow card) 84'	Stadium: Providence Park; Attendance: 12,440; Referee: Ricardo Fierro

April 23 Group stage	San Diego Wave FC	1–1	OL Reign	San Diego, California
10:00 pm	Sheridan (yellow card) 13'; Morgan 45+1' (pen.); Jakobsson (yellow card) 65'; Turnbow (yellow card) 69' (yellow-red card) 81'	Report	Watt 13'; Fishlock (yellow card) 69'	Stadium: Torero Stadium; Attendance: 6,000; Referee: Samantha Martinez

==== Divisional standings ====
Pos	Team	Pld	W	T	L	GF	GA	GD	Pts	Qualification	RGN	POR	SD	LA
1	OL Reign	6	4	2	0	11	5	+6	14	Advance to knockout stage	—	1–1	3–1	2–1
2	Portland Thorns FC	6	3	1	2	8	5	+3	10		0–1	—	3–2	3–0
3	San Diego Wave FC	6	1	2	3	9	11	−2	5		1–1	0–1	—	4–2
4	Angel City FC	6	1	1	4	6	13	−7	4		1–3	1–0	1–1	—

Source: NWSL
Rules for classification: 1) Total points; 2) Total goal differential; 3) Total number of goals scored; 4) Head-to-head points record; 5) Head-to-head goal differential; 6) Head-to-head number of goals scored; 7) Fewest disciplinary points; 8) Drawing of lots

== Squad statistics ==
=== Appearances and goals ===
As of match played October 23, 2022; only players who have made appearances are listed.

Starting appearances are listed first, followed by substitute appearances after the + symbol where applicable.

No.	Pos	Nat	Player	Total		NWSL		Playoffs		Challenge Cup	
No.	Pos	Nat	Player	Apps	Goals	Apps	Goals	Apps	Goals	Apps	Goals
Goalkeepers
1	GK	(Canada) CAN	Kailen Sheridan	24	0	18	0	2	0	4	0
21	GK	(England) ENG	Carly Telford	6	0	4	0	0	0	2	0
Defenders
2	DF	(United States) USA	Abby Dahlkemper	13	0	8	0	0	0	5	0
4	DF	(United States) USA	Naomi Girma	27	0	19	0	2	0	5+1	0
16	DF	(United States) USA	Madison Pogarch	8	0	3+3	0	0+2	0	0	0
18	DF	(United States) USA	Kaleigh Riehl	27	2	17+3	1	2	0	2+3	1
20	DF	(United States) USA	Christen Westphal	30	0	20+2	0	2	0	6	0
26	DF	(United States) USA	Mia Gyau	5	0	0+5	0	0	0	0	0
29	DF	(United States) USA	Taylor Hansen	1	0	0	0	0	0	1	0
Midfielders
5	MF	(Australia) AUS	Emily van Egmond	27	1	22	0	2	1	2+1	0
6	MF	(United States) USA	Kelsey Turnbow	29	0	14+7	0	1+1	0	5+1	0
14	MF	(United States) USA	Kristen McNabb	29	2	21+1	2	2	0	5	0
17	MF	(United States) USA	Sydney Pulver	1	0	0+1	0	0	0	0	0
22	MF	(United States) USA	Taylor Kornieck	26	5	17+1	3	2	1	5+1	1
23	MF	(United States) USA	Belle Briede	27	2	13+6	1	2	0	2+4	1
35	MF	(United States) USA	Jackie Altschuld	2	0	0+2	0	0	0	0	0
Forwards
7	FW	(United States) USA	Amirah Ali	26	3	4+14	2	0+2	0	1+5	1
9	FW	(England) ENG	Jodie Taylor	20	2	6+7	1	0+1	0	4+2	1
10	FW	(Sweden) SWE	Sofia Jakobsson	25	1	12+5	1	1+1	0	4+2	0
11	FW	(United States) USA	Jaedyn Shaw	7	3	4+1	3	2	0	0	0
13	FW	(United States) USA	Alex Morgan	25	20	16+1	15	2	1	5+1	4
15	FW	(United States) USA	Makenzy Doniak	18	3	5+11	3	0+2	0	0	0
27	FW	(Germany) GER	Marleen Schimmer	14	0	4+5	0	0	0	0+5	0
33	FW	(Mexico) MEX	Katie Johnson	19	0	6+9	0	0	0	3+1	0
Players who appeared for the club but left during the season:
19	DF	(United States) USA	Tegan McGrady	15	0	9+1	0	0	0	5	0

=== Goalscorers ===
As of match played October 23, 2022.

Rank	No.	Pos.	Ntn.	Name	NWSL	Playoffs	Cup	Total
1	13	FW	(United States)	Alex Morgan	15	1	4	20
2	22	MF	(United States)	Taylor Kornieck	3	1	1	5
3	14	DF/MF	(United States)	Kristen McNabb	3	0	0	3
3	11	FW	(United States)	Jaedyn Shaw	3	0	0	3
3	7	FW	(United States)	Amirah Ali	2	0	1	3
3	15	FW	(United States)	Makenzy Doniak	3	0	0	3
7	23	MF	(United States)	Belle Briede	1	0	1	2
7	18	DF	(United States)	Kaleigh Riehl	1	0	1	2
7	9	FW	(England)	Jodie Taylor	1	0	1	2
10	10	FW	(Sweden)	Sofia Jakobsson	1	0	0	1
10	5	MF	(Australia)	Emily van Egmond	0	1	0	1
Total					31	3	9	43

=== Shutouts ===
As of match played October 23, 2022.

Rank	No.	Pos.	Name	NWSL	Playoffs	Cup	Total
1	1	GK	(Canada) Kailen Sheridan	8	0	0	8
2	21	GK	(England) Carly Telford	1	0	0	1
Total				9	0	0	9

== Awards ==
=== NWSL Monthly Awards ===
==== Player of the Month ====
Month	Player	Ref.
May	(United States) Alex Morgan	

==== Rookie of the Month ====
Month	Player	Ref.
May	(United States) Naomi Girma	

==== Team of the Month ====
Month	Players	Ref.
May	(United States) Naomi Girma (United States) Taylor Kornieck (United States) Alex Morgan	
June	(United States) Naomi Girma (United States) Taylor Kornieck (United States) Alex Morgan	
August	(United States) Naomi Girma	

=== NWSL Weekly Awards ===
==== Player of the Week ====
Week	Player	Ref.
2	(United States) Alex Morgan	
7	(United States) Taylor Kornieck	
8	(United States) Alex Morgan	
15	(United States) Makenzy Doniak	
18	(Canada) Kailen Sheridan	

==== Save of the Week ====
Week	Player	Ref.
12	(Canada) Kailen Sheridan	

== Transactions ==
=== 2022 NWSL Expansion Draft ===
The 2022 NWSL Expansion Draft was held on December 16, 2021. Blue highlights indicate United States federation players.

Pick	Nat.	Player	Pos.	Previous team	Ref.
2	(United States)	Kristie Mewis	MF	Houston Dash	
4	(United States)	Kristen McNabb	DF	OL Reign	
6	PASS				
8	PASS				
9	(United States)	Kaleigh Riehl	DF	Racing Louisville FC	

=== 2022 NWSL Draft ===
Draft picks are not automatically signed to the team roster. The 2022 NWSL Draft was held on December 18, 2021.

Round	Pick	Player	Pos.	College	Status
1	1	(United States) Naomi Girma	DF	Stanford	Signed
1	9	(Germany) Marleen Schimmer	FW	Grand Canyon	Signed
2	25	(United States) Sydney Pulver	MF	Washington State	Signed
3	27	(United States) Belle Briede	MF	Stanford	Signed
4	40	(United States) Kayla Bruster	DF	Georgia	Signed

=== Transfers in ===
Date	Player	Pos.	Previous club	Fee/notes	Ref.
November 22, 2021	(United States) Abby Dahlkemper	DF	(United States) North Carolina Courage	Acquired in a trade in exchange for $190,000 in allocation money and San Diego's natural 1st-round selection in the 2023 NWSL Draft.	
December 1, 2021	(England) Jodie Taylor	FW	(United States) Orlando Pride	Acquired in a trade in exchange for San Diego's natural 2nd-round 2023 NWSL Draft pick, natural 3rd-round 2023 NWSL Draft pick, or allocation money, pending conditions met.	
December 1, 2021	(United States) Tegan McGrady	DF	(United States) Washington Spirit	Acquired in a trade with an international spot in 2022 and Washington's natural 1st-round 2022 NWSL Draft pick, in exchange for full protection in the 2022 NWSL Expansion Draft.	
December 2, 2021	(United States) Makenzy Doniak	FW	(United States) Chicago Red Stars	Acquired in a trade in exchange for allocation money and protection in the 2022 NWSL Expansion Draft.	
December 2, 2021	(Mexico) Katie Johnson	FW	(United States) Chicago Red Stars	Acquired in a trade in exchange for allocation money and protection in the 2022 NWSL Expansion Draft.	
December 2, 2021	(United States) Kelsey Turnbow	FW	(United States) Chicago Red Stars	Acquired in a trade in exchange for allocation money and protection in the 2022 NWSL Expansion Draft.	
December 4, 2021	(Canada) Kailen Sheridan	GK	(United States) NJ/NY Gotham FC	Acquired in a trade in exchange for $130,000 in allocation money and protection in the 2022 NWSL Expansion Draft.	
December 10, 2021	(Wales) Angharad James	MF	(United States) North Carolina Courage	Acquired in a trade in exchange for protection in the upcoming 2022 NWSL Expansion Draft.	
December 13, 2021	(United States) Alex Morgan	FW	(United States) Orlando Pride	Acquired in a trade in exchange for $275,000 in allocation money and player rights to Angharad James.	
December 16, 2021	(United States) Christen Westphal	DF	(United States) Portland Thorns FC	Acquired in a trade in exchange for $50,000 in allocation money and protection in the 2022 NWSL Expansion Draft.	
December 16, 2021	(United States) Amirah Ali	FW	(United States) Portland Thorns FC	Acquired in a trade in exchange for $50,000 in allocation money and protection in the 2022 NWSL Expansion Draft.	
January 15, 2022	(Sweden) Sofia Jakobsson	FW	(Germany) Bayern Munich	Transfer with fee from Bayern Munich.	
January 16, 2022	(United States) Mia Gyau	DF	(United States) Duke Blue Devils	Free agent signing.	
January 18, 2022	(Australia) Emily van Egmond	MF	(United States) Orlando Pride	Acquired in a trade in exchange for $125,000 of allocation money, with potential additional funds pending conditions met, and San Diego's natural 2nd round pick in the 2024 NWSL Draft.	
January 18, 2022	(United States) Taylor Kornieck	MF	(United States) Orlando Pride	Acquired in a trade in exchange for $125,000 of allocation money, with potential additional funds pending conditions met, and San Diego's natural 2nd round pick in the 2024 NWSL Draft.	
January 24, 2022	(England) Carly Telford	GK	(England) Chelsea	Free agent signing.	
June 1, 2022	(United States) Jackie Altschuld	MF	(Iceland) Tindastóll	Signed as National Team Replacement Player. Signed to a standard player agreement for the remainder of the season on August 25, 2022.	
June 1, 2022	(United States) Sydney Cummings	DF	(United States) Georgetown Hoyas	Signed as National Team Replacement Player.	
June 1, 2022	(United States) Sarah Sodoma	FW	(United States) Arkansas State Red Wolves	Signed as National Team Replacement Player.	
July 18, 2022	(United States) Jaedyn Shaw	FW	(United States) Solar SC	Signed via discovery to a one-year contract.	
July 25, 2022	(United States) Madison Pogarch	DF	(United States) Portland Thorns FC	Acquired in a trade in exchange for Tegan McGrady.	

=== Transfers out ===
Date	Player	Pos.	Destination club	Fee/notes	Ref.
December 16, 2021	(United States) Kristie Mewis	MF	(United States) NJ/NY Gotham FC	Traded in exchange for $200,000 in allocation money.	
December 16, 2021	(Wales) Angharad James	MF	(United States) Orlando Pride	Traded with $275,000 of allocation money in exchange for Alex Morgan.	
July 25, 2022	(United States) Tegan McGrady	DF	(United States) Portland Thorns FC	Traded in exchange for Madison Pogarch.	

=== Preseason trialists ===
Trialists are non-rostered invitees during preseason and are not automatically signed. The Wave released their preseason roster on January 31, 2022.

Player	Position	Previous team
(United States) Melissa Lowder	GK	(United States) Santa Clara Broncos
(United States) Emory Wegener	GK	(United States) Georgia Bulldogs
(United States) Taylor Hansen	DF	(United States) Montana Grizzlies
(United States) Megan Reid	DF	(United States) Lamorinda United, Virginia Cavaliers
(United States) Meleana Shim	MF	(United States) Houston Dash (retirement)
(United States) Sydney Zandi	MF	(United States) Virginia Cavaliers
(United States) Taylor Porter	MF	(United States) Portland Thorns FC
(United States) Ru Mucherera	FW	(Finland) KuPS
(United States) Sarah Sodoma	FW	(United States) Arkansas Razorbacks
(United States) Emerson Layne	FW	(United States) TCU Horned Frogs

Signed to first team contract.
Signed to National Team Replacement contract during the season.

== See also ==
- 2022 National Women's Soccer League season
- 2022 in American soccer
