= Katie Johnson (footballer) =

Mexican footballer (born 1994)

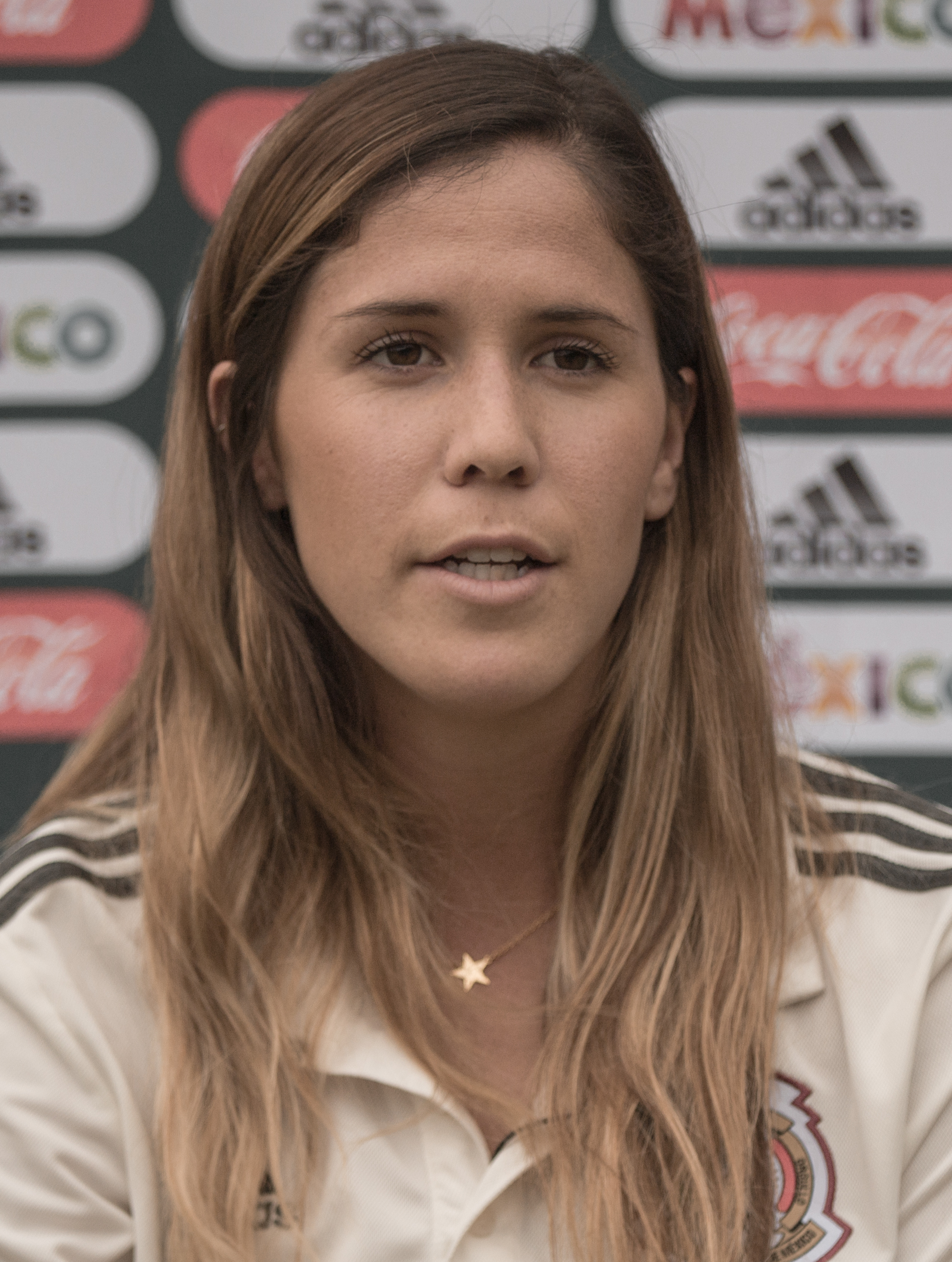
- Johnson with Mexico in 2016

Personal information
- Full name: Katlyn Alicia Johnson Carreón
- Date of birth: 14 September 1994 (age 32)
- Place of birth: Monrovia, California, U.S.
- Height: 1.75 m (5 ft 9 in)
- Position: Attacking midfielder

College career
Years	Team	Apps	(Gls)
2012–2016	USC Trojans	83	(24)

Senior career*
Years	Team	Apps	(Gls)
2017	Seattle Reign	23	(4)
2018	Sky Blue FC	19	(4)
2019–2021	Chicago Red Stars	47	(3)
2022	San Diego Wave	15	(0)
2023–2024	Angel City	23	(3)

International career^{‡}
2015–2018	Mexico	23	(8)
- * Club domestic league appearances and goals as of 12 May 2024. ‡ National team caps and goals as of 9 October 2018.

Katlyn Alicia Johnson Carreón (born 14 September 1994) is a former professional footballer who most recently played as a forward for National Women's Soccer League (NWSL) club Angel City FC. Born in the United States, she represented the Mexico national team.

== Early life ==
Born and raised in Monrovia, California, a suburb of Los Angeles, Johnson is the daughter of an American father, Dennis Johnson, and a Mexican mother, Esther Carreón. Her sister, Isabelle, also played collegiate soccer for the University of Southern California.

Johnson attended Flintridge Sacred Heart Academy in La Canada, California and was a high school All-American soccer player. She scored 57 goals during her high school career.

== Collegiate career ==
Johnson played forward for the USC Trojans women's soccer team in the 2012, 2013, 2014, and 2016 seasons. She was injured and did not play in the 2015 season. During her four seasons she appeared in 83 games and scored 24 goals and had 6 assists. She was named the Most Outstanding Player on Offense in the 2016 College Cup, scoring the only goal in the semi-final and two goals in the final to lead USC to its second national championship in women's soccer.

== Club career ==
=== Seattle Reign, 2017 ===
On 12 January 2017, Johnson was selected by Seattle Reign FC as the 16th overall selection in the 2017 NWSL College Draft. She made her debut for the club in a match against the Houston Dash on 22 April 2017 and scored her first goal helping the Reign win 5–1. Mostly coming off the bench as a substitute she finished the season with four goals and two assists.

=== Sky Blue, 2018 ===
In January 2018, Johnson was traded to Sky Blue FC. She was named Player of the Week for Week 21 of the 2018 NWSL season after scoring 2 goals in Sky Blue's 2–2 draw against the Utah Royals.

=== Chicago Red Stars, 2019–2021 ===
In January 2019, the Chicago Red Stars announced they had acquired Johnson from Sky Blue FC in exchange for the sixth overall pick and highest second-round pick in the 2020 NWSL College Draft. Johnson had her first appearance for the Red Stars as a substitute for Sam Kerr in the 46th minute of a 2–1 loss to the Portland Thorns in the 2019 Thorns Spring Invitational preseason tournament

=== San Diego Wave FC, 2022 ===
In December 2021, San Diego Wave FC announced it has acquired the rights to Mexican international Johnson, fellow Southern California native Makenzy Doniak and Kelsey Turnbow in a trade with the Chicago Red Stars. In exchange, the Red Stars received roster protection in the 2022 NWSL Expansion Draft plus allocation money. In November 2022 the team announced her contract would not be renewed.

=== Angel City FC, 2023–2024 ===
In January 2023, Johnson was signed by Angel City FC on a two-year contract. Her first appearance was in Angel City's season opener which was also her 100th NWSL game. Johnson came off the bench to score her first goal for Angel City on 2 April 2023, a last minute match-winner against Orlando Pride in a 1–2 victory. Johnson made 18 regular season appearances and scored 3 goals during her first season with Angel City. At the conclusion of the 2024 season, Johnson became a free agent and on 10 December 2024, Angel City announced they would not be signing a new contract with Johnson. A few weeks later on 20 December 2024, Johnson announced her retirement from professional soccer after eight seasons in the NWSL.

== International career ==
Through birth and descent, Johnson was eligible to play for either the United States or Mexico national teams, ultimately choosing to represent the latter at the senior level. She made her debut on 9 December 2015 in a 0–3 loss against Canada at the International Women's Football Tournament of Natal of that year.

Shortly after, Johnson appeared in two matches and scored one goal for the Mexico national team in the 2016 CONCACAF Women's Olympic Qualifying Championship. Mexico did not qualify to play in the Olympics. She scored the lone Mexican goal in Mexico's 4–1 friendly loss to the United States on 5 April 2018.

Johnson scored three goals at the 2018 Central American and Caribbean Games helping Mexico win the gold medal.

== Career statistics ==
=== Club ===
As of 6 August 2024

Appearances and goals by club, season and competition
Club	Season	League			Cup (Note: Includes the NWSL Challenge Cup, NWSL Fall Series, and NWSL x Liga MX Femenil Summer Cup.)		Playoffs (Note: Includes NWSL Playoffs.)		Other		Total	
Club	Season	Division	Apps	Goals	Apps	Goals	Apps	Goals	Apps	Goals	Apps	Goals
Seattle Reign FC	2017	NWSL	23	4	–		–		–		23	4
Sky Blue FC	2018	NWSL	19	4	–		–		–		19	4
Chicago Red Stars	2019	NWSL	18	1	–		1	0	–		19	1
Chicago Red Stars	2020	NWSL	–		8	0	–		–		8	0
Chicago Red Stars	2021	NWSL	23	1	4	1	3	1	–		30	3
Chicago Red Stars	Total		41	2	12	1	4	1	–		57	4
San Diego Wave FC	2022	NWSL	15	0	4	0	0	0	–		19	0
Angel City FC	2023	NWSL	18	3	6	0	1	0	1	0	26	3
Angel City FC	2024	NWSL	5	0	1	0	0	0	–		6	0
Career total			121	13	23	1	5	1	1	0	150	15

=== International goals ===
Scores and results list Mexico's goal tally first

No.	Date	Venue	Opponent	Score	Result	Competition
1	16 December 2015	Arena das Dunas, Natal, Rio Grande do Norte, Brazil	Trinidad and Tobago	1–0	3–0	2015 International Tournament of Natal
2	10 February 2016	Toyota Stadium, Frisco, Texas, United States	Puerto Rico	6–0	6–0	2016 CONCACAF Olympic Qualifying
3	4 February 2017	BC Place, Vancouver, Canada	Canada	2–3	2–3	Friendly match
4	5 April 2018	EverBank Field, Jacksonville, United States	United States	1–4	1–4	Friendly match
5	20 July 2018	Estadio Moderno Julio Torres, Barranquilla, Colombia	Trinidad and Tobago	4–1	5–1	2018 Central American and Caribbean Games
6	24 July 2018	Estadio Moderno Julio Torres, Barranquilla, Colombia	Nicaragua	2–0	4–0	2018 Central American and Caribbean Games
7	30 July 2018	Estadio Moderno Julio Torres, Barranquilla, Colombia	Costa Rica	3–1	3–1	2018 Central American and Caribbean Games
8	7 October 2018	Sahlen's Stadium, Cary	Trinidad and Tobago	2–1	4–1	CONCACAF Women's Championship

== Honors ==
USC Trojans

- NCAA Division I Women's Soccer Championship: 2016

== See also ==
- List of Mexico women's international footballers
