= Kayla Bruster =

American soccer player (born 1999)

Personal information
- Full name: Kayla Lorina Bruster
- Date of birth: April 29, 1999 (age 27)
- Height: 5 ft 7 in (1.70 m)
- Position: Center back

Youth career
- Tophat SC

College career
Years	Team	Apps	(Gls)
2017–2021	Georgia Bulldogs	80	(0)

Senior career*
Years	Team	Apps	(Gls)
2022	San Diego Wave	0	(0)
2024	Fylkir	16	(0)
- * Club domestic league appearances and goals as of March 1, 2025

Kayla Lorina Bruster (born April 29, 1999) is an American professional soccer player who plays as a center back. She played college soccer for the Georgia Bulldogs before being selected by San Diego Wave FC in the 2022 NWSL Draft.

== Early life ==
Born to Sherman and Kathy Bruster, Bruster was raised in Atlanta, Georgia. She lived in Smyrna and attended Woodward Academy in the nearby neighborhood of College Park. As a freshman and junior, Bruster was named the MVP of Woodward Academy's soccer team. She also played club soccer for Tophat SC.

== College career ==
Bruster joined the Georgia Bulldogs in 2017. In her second season of college, she started every single one of Georgia's matches, a feat she would later repeat on two other occasions. The following year, Bruster was named to the All-SEC first team. In 2020, she was a member of the All-Conference second team despite missing the SEC Tournament with a finger injury. Bruster helped to anchor the Bulldogs' backline for three more seasons, including a fifth year in which she opted to play for an extra year of college to set herself up for a chance to play professionally. In her entire collegiate career, Bruster played in 80 matches, was a three-time SEC Honor Roll recipient, and was twice named to the SEC preseason watchlist.

== Club career ==
=== San Diego Wave ===
San Diego Wave FC selected Bruster in the fourth round of the 2022 NWSL Draft ahead of the team's inaugural season. As the 40th overall pick of the draft, she became the second-ever Bulldog to be drafted into the NWSL. Bruster's rookie season was hampered with injuries and she struggled to earn playing time. In the end, the Wave elected not to exercise Bruster's contract option, and she left San Diego without having made an appearance in any competitions.

=== Fylkir ===
On December 21, 2023, Bruster signed with Icelandic club Fylkir, joining the team on a one-year contract on its return to the Besta deild kvenna. She made 16 appearances in her first season with Fylkir, including a standout performance in a 0–0 draw with Víkingur. At the end of the season, Fylkir were relegated back down to the 1. deild kvenna, Iceland's second-tier women's soccer league.

== Personal life ==
Bruster's sister, Baleigh Bruster, played for four years on the Duke Blue Devils women's soccer team.

== Career statistics ==
=== Club ===
As of March 1, 2025

Appearances and goals by club, season and competition
Club	Season	League			Cup (Note: Includes the NWSL Challenge Cup)		Playoffs (Note: Includes NWSL Playoffs)		Total	
Club	Season	Division	Apps	Goals	Apps	Goals	Apps	Goals	Apps	Goals
San Diego Wave FC	2022	NWSL	0	0	0	0	0	0	0	0
Fylkir	2024	Besta deild kvenna	16	0	0	0	—		16	0
Career total			16	0	0	0	0	0	16	0
