= Madison Pogarch =

American soccer player (born 1997)

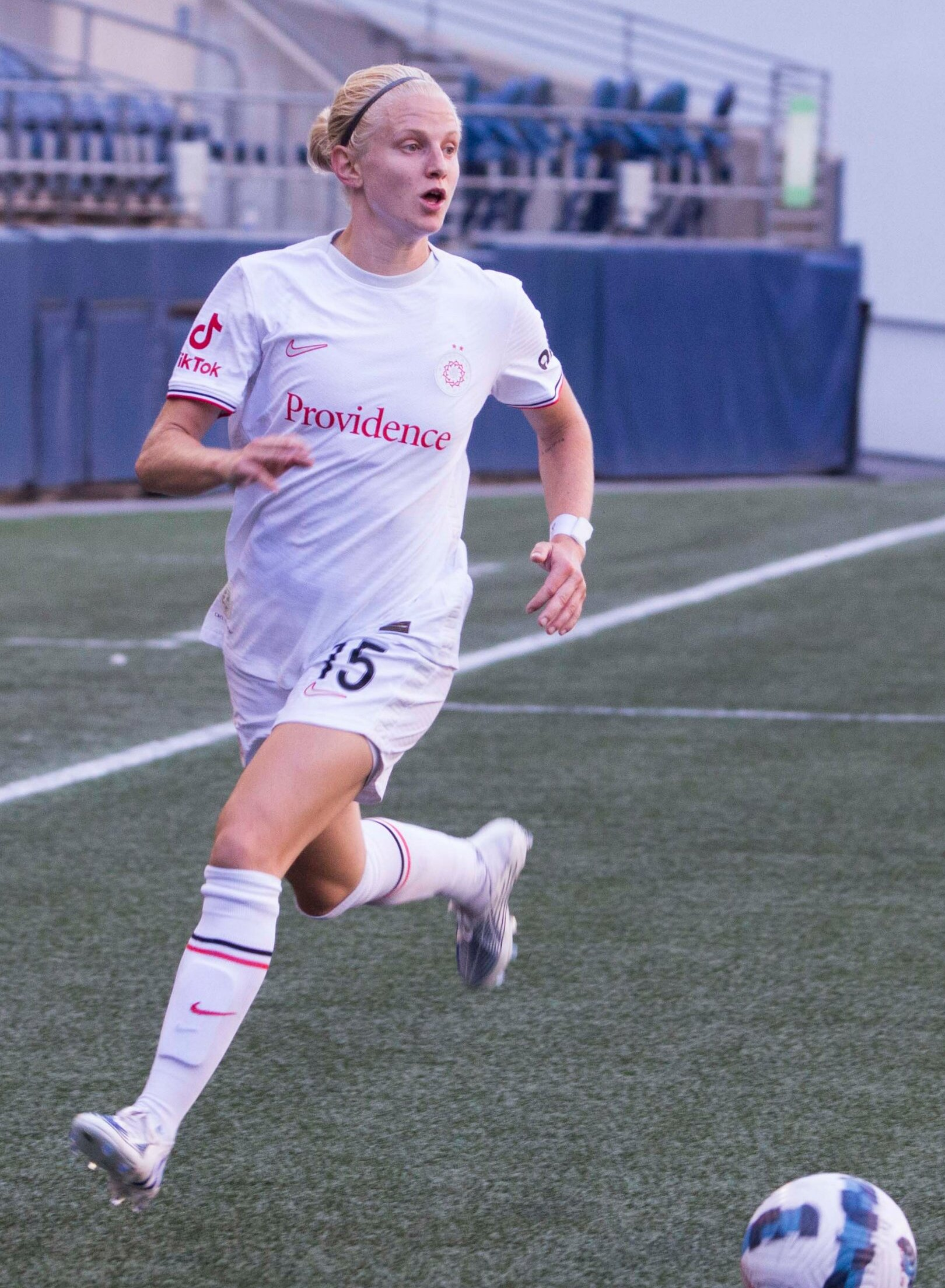
- Pogarch with the Portland Thorns in 2022

Personal information
- Full name: Madison Pogarch
- Date of birth: November 5, 1997 (age 29)
- Place of birth: Hartland, Michigan, United States
- Height: 5 ft 6 in (1.68 m)
- Position: Left back

Team information
- Current team: Calgary Wild
- Number: 41

Youth career
- Michigan Jaguars

College career
Years	Team	Apps	(Gls)
2015–2017	Central Michigan Chippewas	58	(3)
2018	Rutgers Scarlet Knights	20	(0)

Senior career*
Years	Team	Apps	(Gls)
2017	Grand Rapids FC	13	(2)
2018	Detroit Sun	6	(2)
2019–2022	Portland Thorns	28	(0)
2022–2023	San Diego Wave	22	(1)
2024–2025	Utah Royals	43	(0)
2026	Hammarby	4	(0)
2026–	Calgary Wild	11	(0)

International career
2019	United States U23		
- * Club domestic league appearances and goals as of October 28, 2026

Madison Pogarch (/ˈpoʊɡɑːrʃ/ POE-garsh; born November 5, 1997) is an American professional soccer player who plays as a left back for Northern Super League club Calgary Wild FC. She played college soccer for the Central Michigan Chippewas and the Rutgers Scarlet Knights. She has previously been a member of the Portland Thorns, San Diego Wave, and Utah Royals of the National Women's Soccer League (NWSL), as well as Swedish Damallsvenskan club Hammarby.

== College career ==
Pogarch played three years of collegiate soccer at Central Michigan University of the Mid-American Conference (MAC), where she was a two-time all-MAC performer and First Team All-MAC in 2017. She completed her education at Rutgers University in 2018 where she started all 19 matches. She was voted Big Ten Defensive Player of the Week on October 9, 2018, after playing every minute in two Big Ten overtime wins, both shutouts.

== Club career ==
While in college, Pogarch played as an amateur with senior semi-pro teams over the summer. She helped Grand Rapids FC to a United Women's Soccer championship in 2017, scoring the only goal of the game in an early win at Fort Wayne. She then played for Detroit Sun in 2018.

Pogarch was signed by the Portland Thorns in early May 2019. She made her first appearance for the team on May 25 in a game against Sky Blue FC and had her first start a few weeks later, on June 15 against the North Carolina Courage.

On July 25, 2022, the Thorns announced that the club had traded Pogarch to San Diego Wave FC in exchange for defender Tegan McGrady.

On December 7, 2023, the Utah Royals announced that the club had signed Pogarch as a free agent through the 2025 season.

On January 6, 2026, Damallsvenskan club Hammarby announced that they had signed Pogarch to a two-year contract.

On July 28, 2026, Northern Super League club Calgary Wild FC announced that they had signed Pogarch.

== International career ==
In August 2019, she was named to the US Women's U-23 team to compete in the 2019 Nordic Tournament.

== Personal life ==
Pogarch married fellow NWSL player Christen Westphal on December 10, 2025.

== Honors ==
Portland Thorns FC

- NWSL Shield: 2021
- NWSL Challenge Cup: 2021
- NWSL Community Shield : 2020
- International Champions Cup: 2021

San Diego Wave

- NWSL Shield: 2023
