= Jackie Altschuld =

American soccer player

Personal information
- Full name: Jacqueline Sadie Altschuld
- Date of birth: May 11, 1995 (age 31)
- Place of birth: Los Angeles, California, U.S.
- Height: 5 ft 5 in (1.65 m)
- Position: Midfielder

Team information
- Current team: FC Honka
- Number: 30

Youth career
- Real So Cal

College career
Years	Team	Apps	(Gls)
2013–2016	San Diego Toreros	78	(16)

Senior career*
Years	Team	Apps	(Gls)
2017	Medkila IL	10	(1)
2018	DFK Varmbol	5	
2019–2021	UMF Tindastóll	55 (Note: In some of her media coverage, she is listed as playing 17 of the UMF Tindastóll games and scoring 1 goal.)	(20)
2022	San Diego Wave FC	2	(0)
2023	FC Honka	5	(0)

Managerial career
- 2024–: San Diego Toreros (assistant)
- 2019–2022: UC San Diego Tritons (assistant)
- * Club domestic league appearances and goals

Jacqueline Sadie Altschuld (born May 11, 1995) is an American soccer player who is currently a midfielder for the FC Honka of the Kansallinen Liiga in Finland. Prior to that, she played for San Diego Wave FC of the NWSL in the US. She has also played with UMF Tindastóll in Iceland and was part of the team that got promoted to the country's top-tier league.

== Early life and education ==
Altschuld was born in Los Angeles to Elina Covarrubias and Bruce Altschuld. She grew up in Woodland Hills, and went to El Camino Real Charter High School, graduating in 2013. She attended University of San Diego and played through to her senior season in 2016.

== Career ==
After her senior year season at USD, she signed with the NWSL's Chicago Red Stars, but in 2017, would then play for Medkila IL in Norway's 1st Division league, Toppserien, making 10 appearances and scoring 1 goal.

In 2018, Altschuld played with Swedish club DFK Värmbol for 5 games.

From 2019 to 2021, Altschuld played for the Icelandic club UMF Tindastóll. She appeared in 55 games, scoring 20 goals. In the 2020 season, Altschuld helped the team to a first-place finish in Lengjudeild (2nd division) which got the team promoted to the top-tier Úrvalsdeild kvenna for the first time in club history.

On July 1, 2022, Altschuld signed as a national team replacement player for San Diego Wave FC in the U.S. National Women's Soccer League. On July 3, she came off the bench in a match against the Washington Spirit. In August, she was signed to a contract for the rest of the 2022 season.

On April 4, 2023, Altschuld signed a professional contract with a Finnish club FC Honka in Kansallinen Liiga.

== Coaching career ==
On February 26, 2024, she was hired as an assistant coach for the University of San Diego women's soccer team.
