= Kelsey Turnbow =

American soccer player (born 1999)

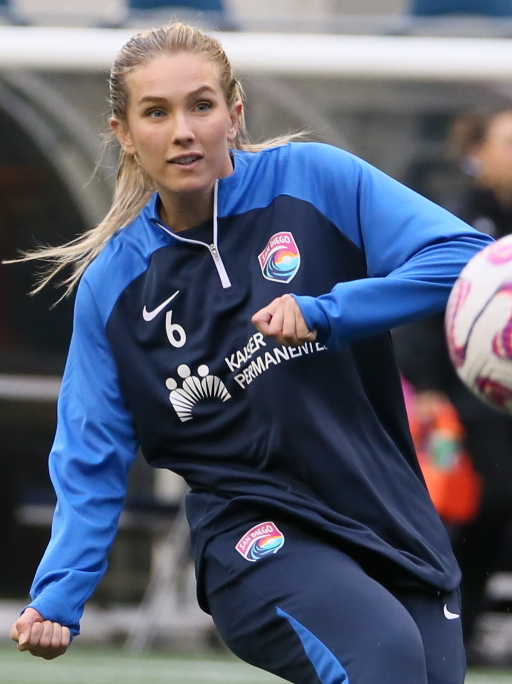
- Turnbow with the San Diego Wave in 2023

Personal information
- Date of birth: January 10, 1999 (age 27)
- Height: 5 ft 8 in (1.73 m)
- Position: Forward

Team information
- Current team: San Diego Wave FC
- Number: 6

College career
Years	Team	Apps	(Gls)
2017–2021	Santa Clara Broncos	102	(56)

Senior career*
Years	Team	Apps	(Gls)
2022–2023	San Diego Wave FC	28	(0)

International career
2017–2018	United States U20	6	(0)
- * Club domestic league appearances and goals as of February 9, 2025

Kelsey Turnbow (born January 10, 1999) is an American retired professional soccer player who played as a forward for San Diego Wave FC of the National Women's Soccer League (NWSL). She began her professional career with Wave FC following an accomplished collegiate career with Santa Clara.

== Early life and college career ==
Turnbow played high school soccer for Central Valley High School in Spokane Valley, Washington and Pinnacle High School in Phoenix, Arizona. She also regularly played for the U.S. youth national teams.

=== Santa Clara Broncos ===
Turnbow helped Santa Clara win the 2020 NCAA Women's Division I championship, scoring in regulation and the penalty kick shootout in the final, and was named the 2020–21 College Cup Offensive Most Outstanding Player. She had previously been named the 2017 West Coast Conference Freshman of the Year among other accolades. Following the title, Turnbow was named the TopDrawerSoccer National Player of the Year. Although the team fell in the semifinals of the 2021 College Cup, Turnbow was named a MAC Hermann Trophy finalist and First Team All-American.

== Club career ==
In the second round of the 2021 NWSL Draft, with the 18th overall pick, the Chicago Red Stars selected Turnbow from Santa Clara. However, Turnbow opted not to join the Red Stars for the 2021 NWSL season and returned to Santa Clara, where she led the team to the semifinals of the 2021 NCAA College Cup.

=== San Diego Wave FC ===
In December 2021, the San Diego Wave Futbol Club announced it had acquired the rights to Mexican international Katie Johnson, Makenzy Doniak, and Turnbow in a trade with the Chicago Red Stars. Turnbow made her club debut in March 2022 as a starter in Wave FC's inaugural match against Angel City FC. She recorded her first professional assist on April 17, 2022, during the 2022 NWSL Challenge Cup, on a goal by Jodie Taylor against Portland Thorns, and her first league assist on May 15, also to Taylor, against the Red Stars. ESPN writer Jeff Kassouf included Turnbow as part of the league's best-ever rookie class, and cited her as a key midfielder and frequent leader of San Diego's pressing attack.

Turnbow announced her retirement on January 26, 2024, as she was pursuing a career in Commercial Real Estate in Nashville, Tennessee.

== Personal life ==
Turnbow is married to Alex Johnson. The couple announced their engagement in January 2025.

== Career statistics ==
=== Club ===
As of February 9, 2025

Appearances and goals by club, season and competition
Club	Season	League			Cup (Note: Includes the NWSL Challenge Cup)		Playoffs (Note: Includes the NWSL Playoffs)		Total	
Club	Season	Division	Apps	Goals	Apps	Goals	Apps	Goals	Apps	Goals
San Diego Wave FC	2022	NWSL	21	0	6	0	2	0	29	0
San Diego Wave FC	2023	NWSL	7	0	4	0	0	0	11	0
Career total			28	0	10	0	2	0	40	0

== Honors ==
Santa Clara Broncos

- NCAA Division I Women's Soccer Championship: 2020

San Diego Wave

- NWSL Shield: 2023

Individual

- 2017 West Coast Conference Freshman of the Year
- 2020–21 NCAA College Cup Offensive Most Outstanding Player
- MAC Hermann Trophy finalist (2021)
- TopDrawerSoccer.com women's Player of the Year (2021)
