= Tegan McGrady =

American soccer player (born 1997)

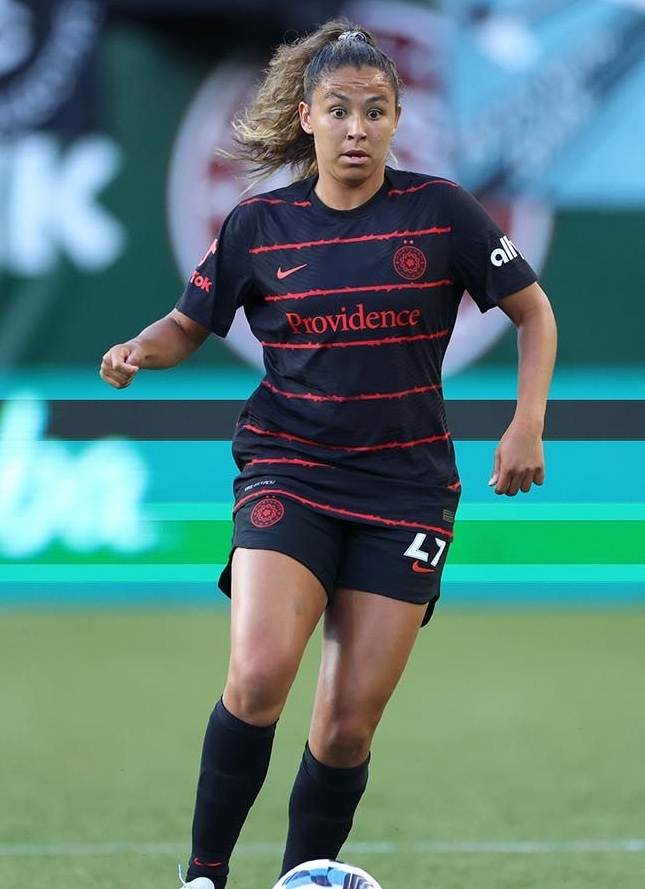
- McGrady with the Portland Thorns in 2022

Personal information
- Full name: Tegan Ann McGrady
- Date of birth: October 11, 1997 (age 29)
- Place of birth: San Jose, California, U.S.
- Height: 5 ft 6 in (1.68 m)
- Position: Defender

Team information
- Current team: Dijon
- Number: 3

Youth career
- MVLA
- 2012–2015: Santa Teresa High School

College career
Years	Team	Apps	(Gls)
2015–2018	Stanford Cardinal	72	(4)

Senior career*
Years	Team	Apps	(Gls)
2019–2021	Washington Spirit	19	(0)
2022	San Diego Wave FC	10	(0)
2022–2023	Portland Thorns FC	6	(0)
2024	Oakland Soul SC	1	(0)
2024–2025	Dijon FCO	18	(0)

International career^{‡}
2013–2014	United States U-17	14	(0)
2016	United States U-20	3	(0)
2017–2018	United States U-23	3	(0)
2018	United States	1	(0)
- * Club domestic league appearances and goals as of 3 October 2025 ‡ National team caps and goals as of April 12, 2018

Tegan Ann McGrady (born October 11, 1997) is an American professional soccer player who plays as a defender.

== Early life and education ==
McGrady was raised in San Jose, California and attended Santa Teresa High School. While at Santa Teresa, she was a three-sport student-athlete who competed in track and field and tennis in addition to soccer. During her sophomore year, McGrady was suspended from high school play by the California Interscholastic Federation and missed games in the CIF Central Coast Section playoffs for participation in unsanctioned United States women's national soccer team camp games.

McGrady later attended Stanford University and played for the Stanford Cardinal women's soccer team. She was a member of the 2017 national championship team.

== Club career ==
=== Washington Spirit ===
Washington Spirit drafted McGrady with the No. 7 overall pick in the 2019 NWSL College Draft and subsequently signed her to a standard contract on March 4, 2019.

McGrady spent much of her rookie season struggling with injuries and made only 6 appearances, 5 of them starts.

Her second NWSL season was abbreviated due to the COVID-19 pandemic; however, McGrady started in all five of the Spirit's 2020 NWSL Challenge Cup matches. McGrady missed the 2020 NWSL Fall Series due to a foot injury.

In October 2020, the Spirit re-signed McGrady to a new two-year contract with a club option for an additional 12 months.

=== San Diego Wave FC ===
San Diego Wave FC announced that the club had acquired McGrady's rights before the expansion team's inaugural season in 2022. She made 10 appearances for the team.

=== Portland Thorns FC ===
On July 25, 2022, Portland Thorns FC announced that the club had traded defender Madison Pogarch to San Diego in exchange for McGrady.

=== Dijon FCO ===
McGrady signed for Dijon FCO in July 2024.

McGrady was released by Dijon in June 2025.

== International career ==
McGrady was a member of multiple United States Soccer Federation youth teams throughout her childhood and joined the United States women's national under-17 soccer team in 2013. She went on to make 11 appearances, starting all of them, and assisted on 5 goals in 818 minutes of play. In 2014, she appeared in 3 games, starting 2, accruing 210 minutes.

McGrady joined the United States women's national under-20 soccer team in 2016 and made 3 appearances, starting 2, for 210 minutes. In 2017, she progressed to the United States women's national under-23 soccer team. She made 3 appearances, all starts, and contributed 2 assists in 258 minutes played.

McGrady made her senior national team debut for the United States on April 8, 2018, against Mexico, as a 58th-minute substitute replacing Mallory Pugh.

== Awards and honors ==
Stanford Cardinal

- NCAA Division I Women's Soccer Championship: 2017

Washington Spirit

- NWSL Championship: 2021

Portland Thorns FC

- NWSL Championship: 2022
