= Marleen Schimmer =

German footballer (born 2000)

Personal information
- Date of birth: 23 October 2000 (age 26)
- Place of birth: Mainz, Germany
- Height: 1.68 m (5 ft 6 in)
- Positions: Forward; midfielder

Team information
- Current team: RB Leipzig
- Number: 14

Youth career
- 2016–2018: TSV Schott Mainz

College career
Years	Team	Apps	(Gls)
2018–2019	Arizona State Sun Devils	35	(11)
2020–2021	Grand Canyon Antelopes	39	(17)

Senior career*
Years	Team	Apps	(Gls)
2022	San Diego Wave	9	(0)
2023	1. FC Köln II	7	(2)
2023–2024	1. FC Köln	24	(3)
2024–	RB Leipzig	30	(10)

International career
2016	Germany U16	8	(2)
2016–2017	Germany U17	15	(9)
2024	Germany U23	1	(0)
Medal record
Women's football
Representing Germany
UEFA Women's Under-17 Championship
Winner	2017 Czech Republic
- * Club domestic league appearances and goals as of 18 June 2026

Marleen Schimmer (born 23 October 2000) is a German professional footballer who plays as a forward or midfielder for Frauen-Bundesliga club RB Leipzig. She has previously played for 1. FC Köln and National Women's Soccer League club San Diego Wave FC. Schimmer also played college soccer for the Arizona State Sun Devils and the Grand Canyon Antelopes in the United States.

== Youth career ==
Born in Mainz, Germany, Schimmer started playing football with her brother as a child. She attended Otto-Schott-Gymnasium, where she helped the school's team win the state championship. Schimmer initially played on a men's club in her youth due to an absence of options before joining TSV Schott Mainz as a teenager. She played with the team in the 2. Frauen-Bundesliga for several years, scoring 16 goals in 35 league games. Schimmer departed from Mainz in 2018 to pursue a college career in the United States.

== College career ==
=== Arizona State Sun Devils ===
In 2018, Schimmer moved to the United States and enrolled in Arizona State University to study psychology. During her two years at Arizona State, she also played college soccer for the Sun Devils. Schimmer scored her first college goal on 14 September 2018, in a 1–0 win over Northern Arizona Lumberjacks. She completed her career with Arizona State having played in 35 matches and scored 11 goals. She was named to the 2018 All-Pac-12 Freshman Team and the 2019 All-Pac-12 Third Team due to her performances as a Sun Devil.

=== Grand Canyon Antelopes ===
In February 2020, Schimmer transferred out of Arizona State and joined the Grand Canyon Antelopes for her remaining years of college. She had a record-setting senior year, tallying 13 goals and 14 assists to become the program single-season leader in both categories. She also scored a hat-trick within 15 minutes in a 6–1 drubbing of California Baptist during the season. Schimmer was named WAC Offensive Player of the Week in October 2021 and GCU's first-ever WAC Offensive Player of the Year for 2021. She also received Academic All-WAC honors and was named to the All-WAC First Team. Schimmer finished her time at Grand Canyon with 39 goals and 17 assists under her belt.

== Club career ==
=== San Diego Wave ===
Following her senior season at Grand Canyon University, Schimmer entered the 2022 NWSL Draft. She was selected by San Diego Wave FC in the 1st round of the draft and 9th overall, becoming GCU's first-ever NWSL Draft selection. In January 2022, Schimmer signed her first NWSL contract with the Wave. She played in the team's inaugural match and assisted Kaleigh Riehl's equalizing goal, which was also San Diego's first goal as a franchise. She made her first NWSL regular season start on 18 May 2022 in an away loss to Racing Louisville FC. At the end of the season, the Wave chose not to exercise a contract option on Schimmer, leaving her to pursue other opportunities.

=== 1. FC Köln ===
In January 2023, Schimmer returned to Germany and signed with 1. FC Köln. She started off playing with Köln's under-20 team in the 2. Frauen-Bundesliga. After performing well, Schimmer earned a professional contract with Köln's first team on 8 June 2023. In May 2024, Schimmer was among the list of players departing from Köln at the end of the season.

=== RB Leipzig ===
In August 2024, Schimmer signed a one-year contract with RB Leipzig. She scored her first goal with Leipzig on 28 September, contributing to a 3–0 win over Turbine Potsdam. She would score 3 more goals in a total of 17 appearances in her first season at Leipzig. At the end of the season, she extended her contract with the club through 2027.

Schimmer kicked off her second season at Leipzig on a good note, scoring and assisting in the opening match of the 2025–26 season to help beat her former club, 1. FC Köln. She soon became one of the team's most important offensive players, alongside Giovanna Hoffmann, before sustaining an ankle injury in October 2025 that briefly interrupted her positive momentum. Upon completing her four-month recovery, Schimmer returned without skipping a beat, scoring 4 goals and recording 1 assist in her first five games back. In March 2026, RB Leipzig extended Schimmer's contract early, locking her down until 2028.

== International career ==
Schimmer has represented Germany at multiple youth levels. As a teenager, she started her international career with the U-16 and U-17 teams. In 2017, she was a member of the Germany squad that won the 2017 UEFA Women's Under-17 Championship. In 2024, Schimmer made her return to youth national team selection, getting a call-up to the U-23 squad. She has made 24 youth international appearances and scored 11 goals.

== Honours ==
Germany U17

- UEFA U-17 Women's Championship: 2017
