= Taylor Hansen =

American soccer player (born 1999)

Personal information
- Full name: Taylor Kay Hansen
- Date of birth: April 4, 1999 (age 27)
- Place of birth: Florida, United States
- Height: 5 ft 4 in (1.63 m)
- Position: Defender

Youth career
- San Diego Surf SC

College career
Years	Team	Apps	(Gls)
2017–2021	Montana Grizzlies	103	(5)

Senior career*
Years	Team	Apps	(Gls)
2022	San Diego Wave	0	(0)
- * Club domestic league appearances and goals as of 04:08, December 29, 2025 (UTC)

Taylor Kay Hansen (born April 4, 1999) is an American former professional soccer player who played as a defender. She played college soccer for the Montana Grizzlies and became the first Grizzlies women's soccer player to sign in the NWSL after spending one season with the San Diego Wave.

== Early life ==
Hansen was born in Florida to Dan and Diane Hansen. The family moved to California and Indiana before settling in Cardiff-by-the-Sea, California, when Hansen was in 8th grade. Although Hansen started playing soccer at age 4, she also participated in various other sports, including tap, ballet, ice skating, and basketball. She eventually settled on soccer after outgrowing the other sports. Hansen played youth club soccer with San Diego Surf SC, winning the ECNL U-15 Championship in 2014 and a Division 1 title in 2016. She attended Del Norte High School in San Diego, where she also played soccer.

== College career ==
Hansen captained and played soccer for the Montana Grizzlies. In her early years of college, she played as a full back and earned All-West third team honors. She scored her first collegiate goal on March 7, 2021, helping the Grizzlies beat MSU Billings 3–0. With Montana, Hansen was a three-time All-Big Sky Conference First Team and a three-time Big Sky Conference All-Tournament Team honoree. As a senior, she was named to the All-West Region First Team by the United Soccer Coaches. Throughout her college career, Hansen played frequent minutes for the Grizzlies, starting all of Montana's matches from her sophomore year to her final year of college. She set the program record for matches played and had the second-highest amount of starts in Grizzlies history. Hansen also left Montana as the 6th-highest assist leader.

== Club career ==
Leading up to the 2022 NWSL Draft, Hansen was on hometown club San Diego Wave FC's radar of draftee options. Ultimately, she went undrafted and instead joined the Wave as a non-roster invitee in their preseason squad. Hansen later signed her first professional contract with the Wave in March 2022, becoming the first Grizzlies women's soccer player to sign in the National Women's Soccer League. She made her professional debut on April 14, starting and playing for 65 minutes at left-back in an NWSL Challenge Cup defeat to the OL Reign. It would be her first and only appearance with the Wave. At the end of the 2022 season, the Wave announced that Hansen would be among the contingent of players not returning to the club in 2023.
