= Kristen McNabb =

American soccer player (born 1994)

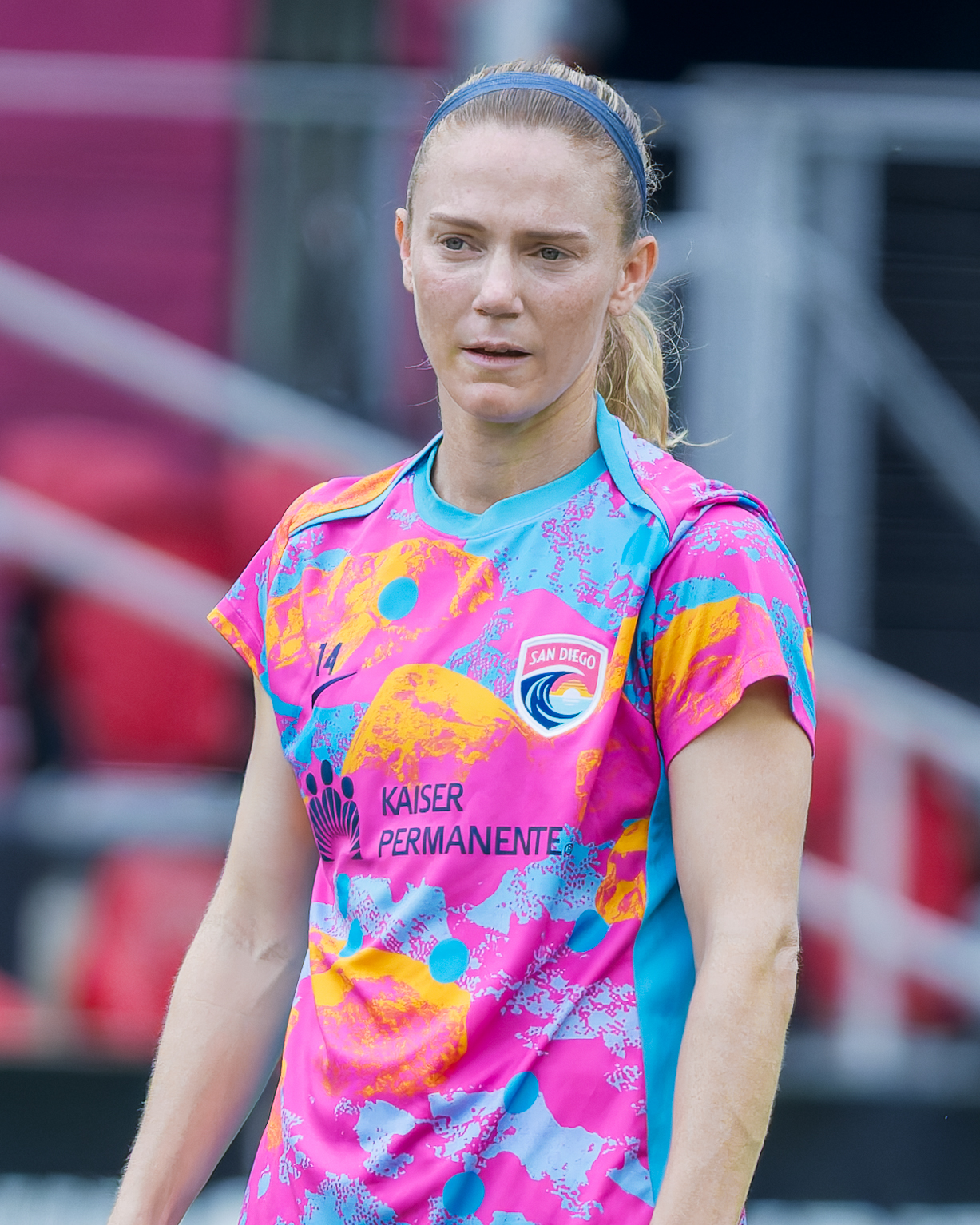
- McNabb with the San Diego Wave in 2026

Personal information
- Full name: Kristen Claire McNabb
- Date of birth: April 17, 1994 (age 32)
- Place of birth: Montville, New Jersey, U.S.
- Height: 5 ft 5 in (1.65 m)
- Positions: Center back; left back

Team information
- Current team: San Diego Wave
- Number: 14

College career
| Years | Team | Apps | (Gls) |
| 2012–2016 | Virginia Cavaliers | 89 | (13) |

Senior career*
| Years | Team | Apps | (Gls) |
| 2017–2021 | OL Reign | 74 | (2) |
| 2017–2018 | → Melbourne Victory (loan) | 11 | (1) |
| 2022– | San Diego Wave | 112 | (6) |

International career
| 2011 | United States U18 | | |
| 2016–2017 | United States U23 | | |
- * Club domestic league appearances and goals as of 16:43, November 15, 2026 (UTC)

Kristen Claire McNabb (born April 17, 1994) is an American professional soccer player who plays as a center back or left back for San Diego Wave FC of the National Women's Soccer League (NWSL). She played college soccer for the Virginia Cavaliers before being drafted by Seattle Reign FC (later OL Reign) in the fourth round of the 2017 NWSL Draft. She spent five seasons with the Reign, including one on loan with Melbourne Victory FC. McNabb has also represented the United States on the under-18 and under-23 national teams.

== Early life ==
McNabb was raised in Montville, New Jersey, where she attended Montville Township High School. She played club soccer for PDA Charge and twice captained the team to a national championship game. She was ranked 34th nationally by TopDrawerSoccer.

== College career ==
McNabb attended the University of Virginia, where she played for the Cavaliers from 2013 to 2016 after redshirting the 2012 season due to injury. During the 2013 season, she made 19 appearances for the Cavaliers including two starts. She sustained a knee injury in a match against Virginia Tech on October 31 which prevented her from playing the remainder of the season.

The following year, she started in all 26 games and scored her first goal during a match against Tennessee. During the 2015 season, McNabb started in all 23 games and was named to the Second-Team NSCAA All-Southeast Region.

In the 2016 season, McNabb captained the Cavaliers. That September she was named the Atlantic Coast Conference (ACC) Co-Offensive Player Of The Week while playing as a defender and scoring twice against Virginia Tech. The same year, McNabb helped the Cavaliers to a 15–5–2 record. The team reached the Round of 16 of the NCAA Division 1 Soccer Championship for the 12th straight season.

== Club career ==
=== OL Reign ===
In January 2017, McNabb was selected by Reign FC as the 37th overall selection in the 2017 NWSL College Draft. After training with the Reign in preseason, she signed her first professional contract with the club on April 3, 2017. She made her debut starting for the club during the season opener on April 15 against Sky Blue FC. She scored her first professional goal on April 22 against the Houston Dash. Her performances in her first two seasons with the Reign earned her a new contract in late 2018, giving her the opportunity to play with the club in 2019.

In October 2017, McNabb joined Australian club Melbourne Victory on loan for the off-season. She played in 11 matches during her loan spell and managed to score 1 goal, a header against Canberra United in October 2017.

=== San Diego Wave ===
In December 2021, San Diego Wave selected McNabb in the 2022 NWSL Expansion Draft. McNabb made her debut for the Wave on the club's inaugural match, a 1–1 draw against Angel City FC on March 19, 2022. She appeared in 5 of the 6 of the Wave's 2022 Challenge Cup games, playing 90 minutes in each fixture. During the Challenge Cup and parts of the 2022 season, McNabb played as a defensive midfielder, but she eventually ended back up in her more natural position of left-back. She scored her first goal for the club on July 10, 2022, in a defeat to Angel City FC. Midway through the 2022 season, McNabb's contract was extended through 2024. She finished the 2022 season with a career-high 2 goals and 24 games played.

McNabb played in 14 games in 2023 before picking up a hip injury that rendered her unavailable from July to October. Her first game back would be the Wave's semifinal defeat to the OL Reign, on November 5, 2023. McNabb's lone goal of the season occurred on June 17, 2023, in a match against Californian rivals Angel City FC. She opened the scoring in the 57th minute with a left-footed strike through the legs of defender Ali Riley and into the back of the net.

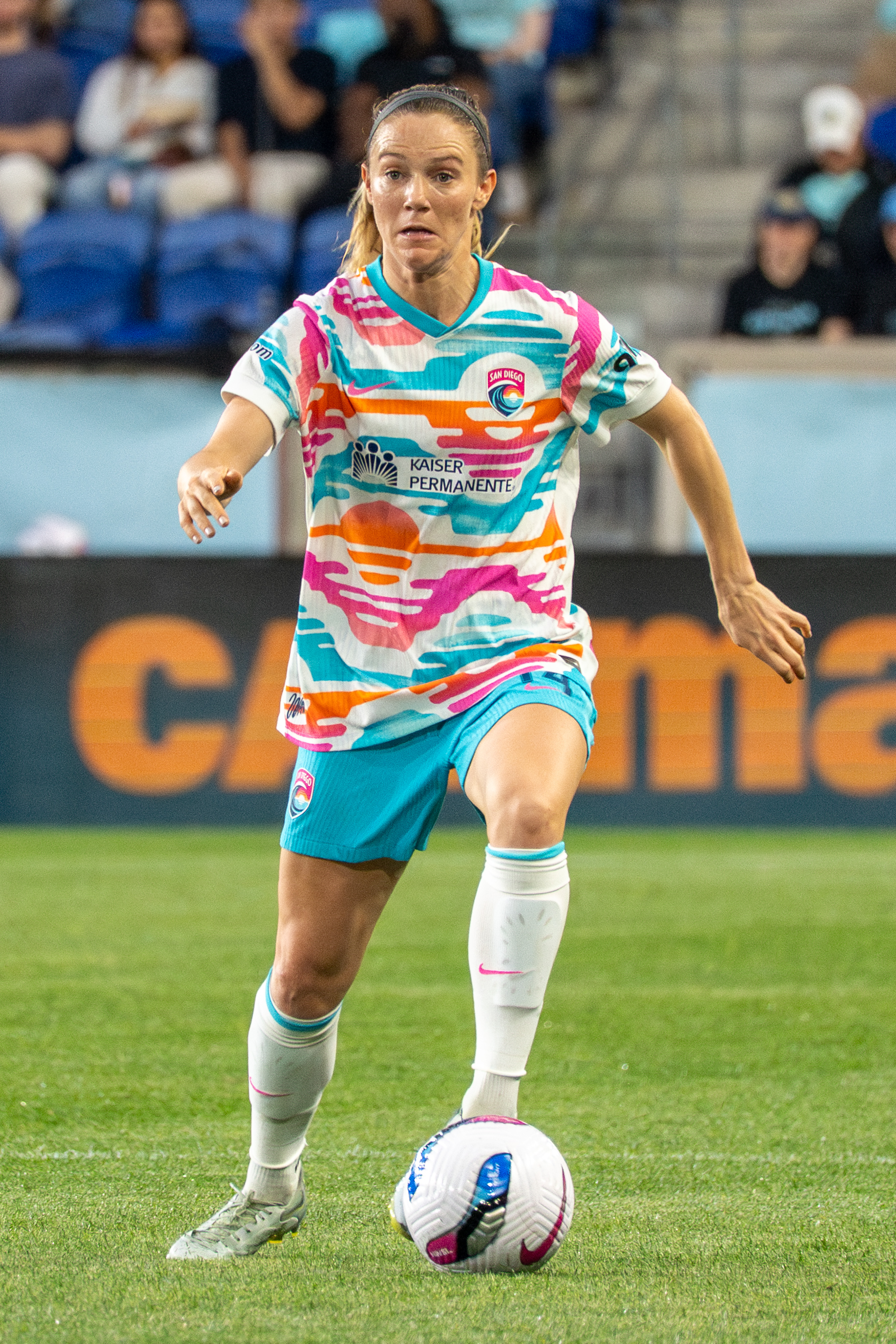
McNabb with the San Diego Wave in 2025

On May 4, 2024, McNabb participated in a 2–1 loss to Seattle Reign FC, her former team. The game set the record for the most cards distributed in an NWSL match, with McNabb adding to the count after conceding a red card in stoppage time. She scored a goal and an own goal in a September fixture against the Washington Spirit, deflecting the ball into her own net in the first half before scoring off of a corner kick in the 68th minute. McNabb's goal and own goal were the only actions on the scoresheet as the match finished in a 1–1 draw. Shortly before the conclusion of the regular season, the Wave re-signed McNabb on a two-year extension through 2026.

Following the Wave's signing of French left-back Perle Morroni, McNabb found herself playing as a center back in her fourth season with San Diego. In May 2025, she scored her first goal of the season, tallying in a 5–2 victory over the North Carolina Courage that set a team record 6-match unbeaten streak. She scored again on October 18, contributing to a 6–1 win over the Chicago Stars that set a single-match scoring record for the Wave. McNabb appeared in 23 games across the regular season and also became the 46th-ever NWSL player to appear in 150 league matches in the process. She helped the club finish in sixth place and qualify for the playoffs, where she played over 100 minutes of an eventual extra-time defeat to the Portland Thorns in the quarterfinals.

Leading up to the 2026 season, Makenzy Robbe and Kailen Sheridan both departed from San Diego, leaving McNabb as the only player from the inaugural Wave squad to still be on the team's roster. On April 3, 2026, McNabb made her 87th regular-season appearance for the club in a victory over Boston Legacy FC, setting a Wave record; four months later, on August 2, she extended the record by registering her 100th appearance for the club. Partway through the season, she agreed to extend her contract with San Diego through 2027. She appeared in all 30 of the Wave's matches on the year and was only one minute short of putting on an iron woman season. Her efforts helped San Diego finish the year in second place and reach the playoff quarterfinals, where they were beaten by the Utah Royals; McNabb played the entirety of the 1–0 defeat and maintained her streak of appearing in every Wave FC playoff match in club history.

== International career ==
McNabb has represented the United States on the under-18 and under-23 national teams.

== Personal life ==
Professional hockey player Colin Blackwell is McNabb's cousin.

== Career statistics ==
=== Club ===
As of November 15, 2026

Appearances and goals by club, season and competition
| Club | Season | League | | | Cup (Note: Includes the NWSL Challenge Cup) | | Playoffs (Note: Includes NWSL Playoffs and A-League Finals Series) | | Continental (Note: Includes CONCACAF W Champions Cup) | | Other | | Total | |
| Club | Season | Division | Apps | Goals | Apps | Goals | Apps | Goals | Apps | Goals | Apps | Goals | Apps | Goals |
|---|---|---|---|---|---|---|---|---|---|---|---|---|---|---|
| Seattle Reign FC (Note: Seattle Reign FC was named Reign FC in 2019 and OL Reign in 2020 and 2021.) | 2017 | NWSL | 18 | 1 | — | | — | | — | | — | | 18 | 1 |
| Seattle Reign FC | 2018 | NWSL | 20 | 0 | — | | 0 | 0 | — | | — | | 20 | 0 |
| Seattle Reign FC | 2019 | NWSL | 15 | 0 | — | | 1 | 0 | — | | — | | 16 | 0 |
| Seattle Reign FC | 2020 | NWSL | — (Note: The 2020 NWSL regular season and playoffs were canceled due to the COVID-19 pandemic.) | | 4 | 0 | — | | — | | 4 (Note: Includes NWSL Fall Series) | 0 | 8 | 0 |
| Seattle Reign FC | 2021 | NWSL | 21 | 1 | 3 | 0 | 1 | 0 | — | | — | | 25 | 1 |
| Seattle Reign FC | Total | | 74 | 2 | 7 | 0 | 2 | 0 | — | | 4 | 0 | 87 | 2 |
| Melbourne Victory (loan) | 2017-18 | A-League | 11 | 1 | — | | — | | — | | — | | 11 | 1 |
| San Diego Wave FC | 2022 | NWSL | 22 | 2 | 5 | 0 | 2 | 0 | — | | — | | 29 | 2 |
| San Diego Wave FC | 2023 | NWSL | 13 | 1 | 1 | 0 | 1 | 0 | — | | — | | 15 | 1 |
| San Diego Wave FC | 2024 | NWSL | 24 | 1 | 0 | 0 | — | | 4 | 1 | 3 (Note: Includes NWSL x Liga MX Femenil Summer Cup) | 0 | 31 | 2 |
| San Diego Wave FC | 2025 | NWSL | 23 | 2 | — | | 1 | 0 | — | | — | | 24 | 2 |
| San Diego Wave FC | 2026 | NWSL | 30 | 0 | — | | 1 | 0 | — | | — | | 31 | 0 |
| San Diego Wave FC | Total | | 112 | 6 | 6 | 0 | 5 | 0 | 4 | 1 | 3 | 0 | 141 | 8 |
| Career total | | | 197 | 9 | 13 | 0 | 7 | 0 | 4 | 1 | 7 | 0 | 228 | 10 |

== Honors ==
San Diego Wave

- NWSL Shield: 2023
- NWSL Challenge Cup: 2024
