= Kaleigh Riehl =

American soccer player (born 1996)

- Riehl with the Utah Royals in 2026

Personal information
- Full name: Kaleigh Ann Riehl
- Date of birth: October 21, 1996 (age 30)
- Place of birth: Fairfax Station, Virginia, United States
- Height: 5 ft 8 in (1.73 m)
- Position: Center back

Team information
- Current team: Utah Royals
- Number: 18

Youth career
- 2004–2015: Braddock Road YC

College career
Years	Team	Apps	(Gls)
2015–2019	Penn State Nittany Lions	101	(2)

Senior career*
Years	Team	Apps	(Gls)
2018	Washington Spirit Reserves		
2020	Sky Blue FC	0	(0)
2020–2021	→ Paris FC (loan)	8	(0)
2021	Racing Louisville	21	(0)
2022–2023	San Diego Wave	22	(1)
2024–	Utah Royals	50	(1)

International career
2013–2014	United States U18		
2014–2016	United States U20		
2017–2019	United States U23	8	
- * Club domestic league appearances and goals as of 04:25, November 10, 2026 (UTC)

Kaleigh Ann Riehl (born October 21, 1996) is an American professional soccer player who plays as a center back for the Utah Royals of the National Women's Soccer League (NWSL).

Riehl has represented the United States at the U-18, U-20 and U-23 levels. She was called up to the senior team training camp in January 2019. Riehl played for Penn State at the collegiate level and was the 11th pick in the 2020 NWSL College Draft, going to Sky Blue FC.

== Early life ==
Riehl was born on October 21, 1996, in Fairfax Station, Virginia. She played with Braddock Road Youth Club '95 Elite for 11 years, with whom she won several competitions.

== College career ==
Riehl played with Penn State University for her entire college career. As a freshman, she started all 27 matches. She was named to the Big 10 all-freshman team and helped lead the team to winning the NCAA Championship. She was redshirted for the 2016 season, during which she started for the U.S. six times at the FIFA U-20 World Cup. As a sophomore, she started all 24 matches and recorded 13 clean sheets. As a junior, she started all 25 matches, recorded 13 clean sheets, and was named Big 10 defender of the year. As a senior, she started all 25 matches. Over all four years, she set the NCAA record for minutes played as an outfield player with 8,847 minutes played.

== Club career ==
On January 16, 2020, Riehl took part in the NWSL College Draft. She was the 11th pick, being chosen by Sky Blue FC. Riehl made her professional debut in the 2020 NWSL Challenge Cup on July 4, 2020, against the Utah Royals FC.

On November 12, 2020, Riehl was selected by Racing Louisville FC in the 2020 NWSL Expansion Draft.

On December 16, 2021, Riehl was selected by San Diego Wave FC in the 2022 NWSL Expansion Draft.

On November 20, 2023, the Utah Royals announced that Riehl had been acquired in a trade from San Diego.

== International career ==
Riehl has played for multiple youth national teams throughout her career. In January 2020, she was called up for the senior team training camp.

== Honors ==
Penn State Nittany Lions

- NCAA Division I Women's Soccer Championship: 2015

San Diego Wave

- NWSL Shield: 2023

Individual

- Big Ten Conference Defender of the Year: 2018

== Personal life ==
In January 2025, Riehl's boyfriend, professional soccer player Wesley Charpie, announced he was leaving Louisville City in order to relocate closer to her.
