= 2024 CONCACAF Women's U-17 Championship squads =

List of the squads for the 2024 CONCACAF Women's U-17 Championship

This is a list of the squads for the 2024 CONCACAF Women's U-17 Championship. The 8 national teams involved in the tournament were required to register a squad of 21 players each, three of whom must be goalkeepers; only players in these squads were eligible to take part in the tournament. Players born on or after 1 January 2007 are eligible to compete.

The age listed for each player is on 1 February 2024, the first day of the tournament. The numbers of caps and goals listed for each player do not include any matches played after the start of the tournament. The club listed is the club for which the player last played a competitive match before the tournament. The nationality for each club reflects the national association (not the league) to which the club is affiliated. A flag is included for coaches who are of a different nationality than their own national team. Players marked (c) were named as captain for their national squad.

== Group A ==
=== Costa Rica ===
Coach: Harold López

=== El Salvador ===
Coach: Eric Acuña

=== Haiti ===
Coach: (Haiti) Marc Ogé. The squad was announced on 22 january 2024.

No.	Pos.	Player	Date of birth (age)	Club
1	GK	Kimberlie Prince	25 July 2008 (aged 15)	(Haitian Football Federation) AS Tigresses
12	GK	Kemberly Cadet	12 July 2007 (aged 16)	(Haitian Football Federation) AS Tigresses
21	GK	Daphca Marc	1 February 2008 (aged 16)	(Haitian Football Federation) Exafoot
3	DF	Djoulissa Pierre	3 May 2007 (aged 16)	(Haitian Football Federation) RJM
17	DF	Yvena Murat	3 February 2007 (aged 16)	(Haitian Football Federation) Exafoot
5	DF	Esther Valeus	7 January 2007 (aged 17)	(Haitian Football Federation) AS Tigresses
13	DF	Aslie Laguerre	14 August 2007 (aged 16)	(Haitian Football Federation) EJJM
7	DF	Neissa François	25 September 2008 (aged 15)	(Haitian Football Federation) AS Tigresses
4	DF	Rozalanka Μeτellus	14 June 2007 (aged 16)	(Haitian Football Federation) Aigle Brillant
2	DF	Djoulandie Gay	23 April 2007 (aged 16)	(Haitian Football Federation) Exafoot
10	MF	Pierreline Nazon	8 July 2007 (aged 16)	(Haitian Football Federation) AS Tigresses
16	MF	Wood-China Semetus	23 November 2007 (aged 16)	(Haitian Football Federation) AS Tigresses
6	MF	Dalanchy Pierre	17 October 2008 (aged 15)	(Haitian Football Federation) Leg-A-Z
14	MF	Derline Saindate	9 October 2007 (aged 16)	(Haitian Football Federation) Unattached
8	MF	Chesnaida Nicolas	10 October 2007 (aged 16)	(Haitian Football Federation) AS Tigresses
11	FW	Nehemie Sainvilus	24 March 2008 (aged 15)	(Haitian Football Federation) Exafoot
9	FW	Lourdjina Etienne	14 July 2007 (aged 16)	(Haitian Football Federation) Invincible
19	FW	Anabella Fleuriot	18 November 2007 (aged 16)	(Haitian Football Federation) Exafoot
20	FW	Dominique Desert	3 September 2008 (aged 15)	(United States Soccer Federation) Cedar Stars Academy
15	FW	Ella Etienne	4 September 2008 (aged 15)	(United States Soccer Federation) Savannah United

=== Mexico ===
Coach: (Costa Rica) Jimena Rojas

== Group B ==
=== Canada ===
Coach: (New Zealand) Emma Humphries

=== Panama ===
Coach: Víctor Suárez

=== Puerto Rico ===
Coach: (United States) Nathaniel González

=== United States ===
The squad was announced on 17 January 2024.

Coach: Katie Schoepfer

No.	Pos.	Player	Date of birth (age)	Caps	Goals	Club
12	GK	Franky Dunlap	6 November 2007 (aged 16)	0	0	(United States Soccer Federation) North Carolina Courage
1	GK	Molly Vapensky	11 May 2007 (aged 16)	1	0	(United States Soccer Federation) Chicago FC United
21	GK	Kennedy Zorn	21 March 2007 (aged 16)	1	0	(United States Soccer Federation) SC del Sol
4	DF	Trinity Armstrong	25 July 2007 (aged 16)	0	0	(United States Soccer Federation) IMG Academy
3	DF	Alexis Coughlin	21 July 2007 (aged 16)	1	0	(United States Soccer Federation) Legends FC
5	DF	Kiara Gilmroe	11 February 2007 (aged 16)	2	0	(United States Soccer Federation) Solar SC
2	DF	Jordyn Hardeman	5 May 2007 (aged 16)	2	0	(United States Soccer Federation) Solar SC
15	DF	Daya King	1 October 2007 (aged 16)	2	0	(United States Soccer Federation) Legends FC
13	DF	Katie Scott	20 June 2007 (aged 16)	2	0	(United States Soccer Federation) Internationals SC
16	DF	Jocelyn Travers	10 October 2007 (aged 16)	2	0	(United States Soccer Federation) FC Bay Area Surf
7	MF	Kimmi Ascanio	21 January 2008 (aged 16)	2	0	(United States Soccer Federation) Florida United SC
11	MF	Melanie Barcenas	30 October 2007 (aged 16)	7	0	(United States Soccer Federation) San Diego Wave FC
8	MF	Riley Cross	18 September 2007 (aged 16)	2	0	(United States Soccer Federation) PDA
10	MF	Kennedy Fuller	9 March 2007 (aged 16)	2	0	(United States Soccer Federation) Solar SC
6	MF	Ainsley McCammon (captain)	16 August 2007 (aged 16)	0	0	(United States Soccer Federation) Solar SC
19	MF	Y-Lan Nguyen	2 June 2007 (aged 16)	0	0	(United States Soccer Federation) VDA
9	FW	Carrie Helfrich	2 July 2007 (aged 16)	2	0	(United States Soccer Federation) Virginia Union FC
18	FW	Rylee McLanahan	14 August 2007 (aged 16)	0	0	(United States Soccer Federation) FC Dallas
17	FW	Alexandra Pfeiffer	26 November 2007 (aged 16)	2	3	(United States Soccer Federation) Kansas City Current
14	FW	Leena Powell	3 October 2007 (aged 16)	1	0	(United States Soccer Federation) Tudela FC
20	FW	Mya Townes	29 July 2007 (aged 16)	2	0	(United States Soccer Federation) The St. James FC
