= 2025 San Diego Wave FC season =

San Diego Wave FC 2025 soccer season

San Diego Wave FC
2025 season
- Owner: Arthur Levine; Lauren Leichtman
- President: Vacant
- Head coach: Jonas Eidevall
- Stadium: Snapdragon Stadium
- NWSL: 6th
- Playoffs: Quarterfinals
- Top goalscorer: League: All: Delphine Cascarino (5); Kenza Dali (5); Dudinha (5)
- Highest home attendance: 18,465 (March 22 vs UTA)
- Lowest home attendance: 11,206 (May 4 vs BAY)
- Biggest win: 6–1 (Oct 18 vs CHI)
- Biggest defeat: 0–3 (Sep 7 vs HOU)
Home colors	Away colors
- All statistics correct as of November 9, 2025.

The 2025 San Diego Wave FC season is the team's fourth season as a professional women's soccer team. Based in San Diego, California, United States, San Diego Wave FC plays in the National Women's Soccer League (NWSL), the top tier of women's soccer in the United States.

At the end of the regular season, the Wave finished in sixth place and made the playoffs for the third time in team history.

== Background ==
The 2024 postseason featured a large number of off-field changes. Ron Burkle sold the team to new owners Arthur Levine and Lauren Leichtman at a record-breaking fee of $113 million. Camille Levin Ashton came in as general manager, replacing former GM Molly Downtain. In December 2024, president Jill Ellis left her role at the Wave to join FIFA as chief football officer. Ellis and the club had previously been accused by former Wave employees of fostering an abusive workplace environment, a claim which Ellis had refuted. Five former employees later filed a lawsuit against the Wave and the NWSL, alleging discrimination, sexual harassment, wrongful termination, and retaliation.

=== Kit changes ===
On February 27, 2025, the Wave announced their new secondary kit, replacing 2024's 'Poderosa'. The New Jersey, named 'Altamar,' is a blue and teal kit that pays homage to the ocean's depths. The team also debuted a new pre-match top and goalkeeper kit.

== Summary ==
=== Preseason ===
The Wave announced multiple staff changes in early preseason. On November 18, 2024, the club revealed that interim coach Landon Donovan would not be returning to the club in 2025, leaving a vacancy in the head coach role. On November 3, the Wave announced another change, with club president Jill Ellis stepping down from her position in order to become FIFA Chief of Football. New developments in the Wave's legal battle arrived on January 6, featuring a sixth former employee joining the set of plaintiffs suing the club. The employee alleged sexual harassment perpetrated by her then-supervisor. In other non-player news, the Wave announced the hiring of Swedish manager Jonas Eidevall as the club's head coach one day later. Eidevall had last managed Arsenal W.F.C. before resigning from his post in October 2024.

On December 10, the Wave announced their first offseason move, trading longtime defender Christen Westphal to the Houston Dash. The club would also go on to see the departures of several other veteran players, including Emily van Egmond and Danielle Colaprico. USWNT players Naomi Girma and Jaedyn Shaw moved on as well, with the Wave selling Girma to Chelsea for a world-record transfer fee. The Wave replaced their outgoings throughout the preseason by bringing in heavy doses of youth. College players Trinity Byars, Trinity Armstrong and Quincy McMahon were introduced to the team, as well as international talents including Gia Corley, Chiamaka Okwuchukwu, and Favour Emmanuel. The club rounded out preseason by bringing in foreign veterans Kenza Dali and Adriana Leon.

The Wave played their first preseason match of the year on February 10, a 3–2 victory against the Utah Royals in Chula Vista. The team then travelled to the Coachella Valley Invitational, where they played to a 0–0 draw with the Houston Dash and later earned a 1–0 win over Bay FC.

=== March ===
The Wave started off their 2025 campaign with a mixed bag of results, featuring a win, draw, and loss. In the team's season opener, they drew, 1–1, with rivals Angel City FC. Newcomer Gia Corley scored San Diego's only goal of the match, and goalkeeper Kailen Sheridan subsequently won the NWSL Save of the Week after stopping a shot from Claire Emslie in the first half. The next game, San Diego's home opener, was a 3–2 defeat over the Utah Royals that featured two assists from Delphine Cascarino and another goal from Corley (the latter of whom later won NWSL Player of the Week honors).

Prior to the Wave's final match of the month, the team signed Colombian international Daniela Arias to a two-year contract. On March 29, they conceded a 2–1 defeat to reigning champions Orlando Pride, the final match before the international window. Nigerian forward Chiamaka Okwuchukwu scored a goal in her debut, but it was not enough to salvage a point from the game. At the end of March, Gia Corley was included in the NWSL Team of the Month after her performance in the first three games of the year.

=== April ===
Returning from the international break, the Wave lost their second game in a row, conceding two unanswered goals at home to the undefeated Kansas City Current. They subsequently rebounded with a 4–1 victory over Racing Louisville FC on April 19. The match featured Kenza Dali's first NWSL goal and a Player of the Week-worthy performance from French forward Delphine Cascarino. Rounding out the month, San Diego secured another high-scoring victory, this time against the Chicago Stars. The game was the Wave's first shutout of the season and included second-year midfielder Kimmi Ascanio's first professional goal. The team also made history by becoming the first NWSL squad to ever start three 17-year-olds in a match. At the end of April, two Wave players were named to the NWSL Team of the Month: French internationals Kenza Dali and Delphine Cascarino.

=== May ===
On May 4, the Wave opened the month with a 2–1 victory over Bay FC. Trinity Armstrong scored her first professional goal in stoppage time, helping San Diego rescue a victory from the game. The next match, a 1–1 draw with the Portland Thorns FC, featured a late-game goal that instead went against the Wave. Jayden Perry scored the tying goal following a second half in which San Diego were down a player due to Kennedy Wesley receiving a red card. However, the team bounced back in the following match, beating Gotham FC on yet another Kimmi Ascanio goal.

In the final game before the international break, the Wave earned a record-setting 5–2 home win over the North Carolina Courage. The result set a new club record for single-game goals scored and also served to extend the Wave's unbeaten streak to six games. Awards came at the end of the month for Jonas Eidevall, who was named Coach of the Month, and Trinity Armstrong, who was recognized on the NWSL Team of the Month. May also featured the Wave's first player transaction since the beginning of the year, with Favour Emmanuel departing from the club on a mutual contract termination.

=== June ===
The Wave played in three June matches before pausing for an international break. The team first had their six-match unbeaten streak shattered by the Seattle Reign, who earned a 2–1 victory at Snapdragon Stadium. San Diego bounced back the following match, scoring 3 first-half goals to get a win against the Houston Dash. In the third game of the month, the Wave drew with the Washington Spirit, 0–0, despite controlling much of the match. The very next day, the club announced the transfer of Mexican forward María Sánchez to Tigres UANL. San Diego had also previously announced the re-signings of Nya Harrison and Jordan Fusco to full contracts, balancing the scales. At the end of the month, Kenza Dali received her second NWSL Team of the Month honor.

=== July ===
The NWSL did not schedule any matches in July, allowing players to participate in various international fixtures. Delphine Cascarino and Hanna Lundkvist both played with their respective national teams in the UEFA Women's Euro 2025, while Daniela Arias represented Colombia in the 2025 Copa América Femenina. Several other players also starred in friendlies for their nations. Meanwhile, the remainder of the Wave squad faced off in two friendly matches against the Utah Royals, both of which ended in draws. Near the end of July, the club announced the signings of young international players Dudinha and Laurina Fazer.

=== November ===
The Wave ended the season with a 2–1 loss to FC Kansas City, giving them 37 points for the year and placing them sixth in the standings; they were tied on points with Racing Louisville FC but beat them on goal difference. Their first-round playoff opponent is the Portland Thorns.

== Stadium and facilities ==
The Wave continued to play at Snapdragon Stadium, sharing the venue with MLS expansion team San Diego FC for the first season of overlap. The stadium's field, which drew criticism in the previous year, was reinstalled ahead of 2025.

== Broadcasting ==
The NWSL's 2023 streaming rights deal continued to take effect, spreading Wave games across CBS Sports, ESPN, Prime Video, and Scripps Sports for the second year of the four-year contract. On March 20, 2025, the Wave renewed their partnership with San Diego broadcasters Fox 5 San Diego and KUSI to locally air seven of the team's matches over the course of the season.

== Team ==
=== Coaching staff ===
As of October 9, 2025.

Coaching
Head coach	Jonas Eidevall
Assistant Coach	Becki Tweed
Head of Goalkeeping	Kenneth Mattsson
Individual Performance Coach	Anja Mittag
Technical
General Manager	Camille Ashton
Technical Director	Chris Loxston

=== Current squad ===
As of November 11, 2025

No.	Nat.	Name	Date of birth (age)	Since	Previous team	Notes (Note: denotes a season-ending injury.)
Goalkeepers
1	(Canada)	Kailen Sheridan (captain)	July 16, 1995 (aged 29)	2022	(United States) NJ/NY Gotham FC	–
22	(United States)	Hillary Beall	January 27, 1999 (aged 26)	2024	(Australia) Western United	–
31	(Bosnia and Herzegovina)	DiDi Haračić	April 12, 1992 (aged 32)	2025	(United States) Angel City FC	–
Defenders
3	(United States)	Trinity Armstrong	July 25, 2007 (aged 17)	2025	(United States) North Carolina Tar Heels	U18
6	(Sweden)	Hanna Lundkvist	July 17, 2002 (aged 22)	2024	(Spain) Atlético Madrid	INT
12	(United States)	Kennedy Wesley	March 8, 2001 (aged 24)	2024	(United States) Stanford Cardinal	–
14	(United States)	Kristen McNabb	April 17, 1994 (aged 30)	2022	(United States) OL Reign	–
23	(United States)	Nya Harrison	November 9, 2002 (aged 22)	2025	(United States) Stanford Cardinal	–
30	(Colombia)	Daniela Arias	August 31, 1994 (aged 30)	2025	(Brazil) Corinthians	INT
34	(United States)	Quincy McMahon	September 26, 2002 (aged 22)	2025	(United States) UCLA Bruins	–
75	(France)	Perle Morroni	October 15, 1997 (aged 27)	2024	(France) Lyon	INT
Midfielders
10	(France)	Kenza Dali	July 31, 1991 (aged 33)	2025	(England) Aston Villa	INT
11	(Germany)	Gia Corley	May 20, 2002 (aged 22)	2025	(Germany) TSG Hoffenheim	–
17	(United States)	Kimmi Ascanio	January 21, 2008 (aged 17)	2024	(United States) Florida United	U18
18	(France)	Laurina Fazer	October 13, 2003 (aged 21)	2025	(France) Paris Saint-Germain	INT
21	(United States)	Savannah McCaskill	July 31, 1996 (aged 28)	2024	(United States) Angel City FC	–
28	(United States)	Jordan Fusco	September 11, 2003 (aged 21)	2025	(United States) Penn State Nittany Lions	–
Forwards
5	(United States)	Trinity Byars	January 29, 2003 (aged 22)	2025	(United States) Texas Longhorns	–
8	(Nigeria)	Chiamaka Okwuchukwu	August 7, 2005 (aged 19)	2025	(Nigeria) Rivers Angels F.C.	INT,
9	(Canada)	Adriana Leon	October 2, 1992 (aged 32)	2025	(England) Aston Villa	INT
15	(United States)	Makenzy Robbe	February 5, 1994 (aged 31)	2022	(United States) Chicago Red Stars	–
19	(Republic of Ireland)	Kyra Carusa	November 14, 1995 (aged 29)	2023	(England) London City Lionesses	–
20	(France)	Delphine Cascarino	February 5, 1997 (aged 28)	2024	(France) Lyon	INT
25	(United States)	Melanie Barcenas	October 30, 2007 (aged 17)	2023	(United States) San Diego Surf SC	U18
88	(Brazil)	Dudinha	July 4, 2005 (aged 19)	2025	(Brazil) São Paulo	INT

==== Out on loan ====
No.	Pos.	Nation	Player
18	FW	CAN	Mya Jones (loaned to AFC Toronto)
—	DF	COL	Sintia Cabezas (loaned to Levante UD)

== Competitions ==
Win Draw Loss

=== Preseason ===
February 10	San Diego Wave FC	3–2	Utah Royals	Chula Vista, California
	Goal	Report	Riehl; Tanaka	Stadium: Chula Vista Elite Athlete Training Center
Note: Closed-door scrimmage

February 16 Coachella Valley Invitational	San Diego Wave FC	0–0	Houston Dash	Indio, California
12:00 pm PT		Report		Stadium: Empire Polo Club

February 22 Coachella Valley Invitational	San Diego Wave FC	1–0	Bay FC	Indio, California
11:00 am PT	Sánchez 90'	Report		Stadium: Empire Polo Club

=== Regular season ===
March 16 1	Angel City FC	1–1	San Diego Wave FC	Los Angeles, California
3:50 pm PT	Hodge (yellow card) 10'; Vignola (yellow card) 30'; A. Thompson 54'; Moriya (yellow card) 80'	Report	Wesley (yellow card) 3'; Corley 5', (yellow card) 24'; Sánchez (yellow card) 40'	Stadium: BMO Stadium; Attendance: 19,728; Referee: Ekaterina Koroleva

March 22 2	San Diego Wave FC	3–2	Utah Royals	San Diego, California
7:00 pm PT	Sánchez 7'; Leon 37', (yellow card) 48'; McNabb (yellow card) 40'; Barcenas (yellow card) 70'; Corley 74'	Report	Zornoza 61'; Tanaka 72'	Stadium: Snapdragon Stadium; Attendance: 18,465; Referee: Shawn Tehini

March 29 3	Orlando Pride	2–1	San Diego Wave FC	Orlando, Florida
9:00 am PT	McCutcheon 50'; Marta 76' (pen.); Chilufya (yellow card) 90+3'	Report	Cascarino (yellow card) 42'; Okwuchukwu 62'	Stadium: Inter&Co Stadium; Referee: Adorae Monroy

April 12 4	San Diego Wave FC	0–2	Kansas City Current	San Diego, California
7:00 pm PT	Debinha 16'; LaBonta 25' (pen.)	Report	McCaskill (yellow card) 34'; Emmanuel (yellow card) 48'	Stadium: Snapdragon Stadium; Referee: John Griggs

April 19 5	Racing Louisville FC	1–4	San Diego Wave FC	Louisville, Kentucky
12:00 pm PT	Hase (yellow card) 39'; Fischer (yellow card) 45'; Borges 45+6' (pen.)	Report	Dali 17'; Barcenas 50'; Cascarino 60', 77'	Stadium: Lynn Family Stadium; Attendance: 4,431; Referee: Jaclyn Metz

April 26 6	Chicago Stars FC	0–3	San Diego Wave FC	Bridgeview, Illinois
4:30 pm PT		Report	Lundkvist 31'; Staab 81' (o.g.); Ascanio 90+3'	Stadium: SeatGeek Stadium; Referee: Danielle Chesky

May 4 7	San Diego Wave FC	2–1	Bay FC	San Diego, California
5:00 pm PT	Wesley 6'; Armstrong 90+5'	Report	Lema 18'; Anderson (yellow card) 43'; Kundananji (yellow card) 52'; Dydasco (yellow card) 67'	Stadium: Snapdragon Stadium; Attendance: 11,206; Referee: Elvis Osmanovic

May 10 8	San Diego Wave FC	1–1	Portland Thorns FC	San Diego, California
7:00 pm PT	Ascanio 6'; Wesley (red card) 41'	Report	Perry 90+8' (pen.)	Stadium: Snapdragon Stadium; Referee: Natalie Simon

May 16 9	Gotham FC	0–1	San Diego Wave FC	Harrison, New Jersey
4:30 pm PT	Harper (yellow card) 90+2'	Report	Dali (yellow card) 6'; Ascanio 30'; Corley (yellow card) 78'	Stadium: Sports Illustrated Stadium; Attendance: 7,819; Referee: Thomas Snyder

May 25 10	San Diego Wave FC	5–2	North Carolina Courage	San Diego, California
7:00 pm PT	Morroni 25'; Leon 40', 60'; McNabb 54'; Sánchez 90+5'	Report	Rauch 12'; O'Sullivan (yellow card) 27'; Matsukubo 51'	Stadium: Snapdragon Stadium; Attendance: 12,760; Referee: Elijio Arreguin

June 6 11	San Diego Wave FC	1–2	Seattle Reign FC	San Diego, California
7:00 pm PT	Cascarino 75'	Report	Barnes (yellow card) 14'; Menti (yellow card) 53', (goal) 67'; Adames 87'	Stadium: Snapdragon Stadium; Attendance: 15,393; Referee: Gerald Flores

June 13 12	Houston Dash	2–3	San Diego Wave FC	Houston, Texas
5:00 pm PT	Olivieri 61'; Ryan 68'; Gareis (yellow card) 90+2'	Report	Dali 17'; Leon 36'; Sánchez 51'; Morroni (yellow card) 60'; McCaskill (yellow card) 87'	Stadium: Shell Energy Stadium; Attendance: 6,241; Referee: Greg Dopka

June 22 13	San Diego Wave FC	0–0	Washington Spirit	San Diego, California
7:00 pm PT	Corley (yellow card) 41'	Report	Hershfelt (yellow card) 49'; Sylla (yellow card) 71'; Kouassi (yellow card) 81'	Stadium: Snapdragon Stadium; Attendance: 12,011; Referee: Matthew Corrigan

August 2 14	North Carolina Courage	0–0	San Diego Wave FC	Cary, North Carolina
4:30 pm PT	O'Sullivan (yellow card) 16'	Report	Ascanio (yellow card) 58'	Stadium: WakeMed Soccer Park; Attendance: 7,109; Referee: Elvis Osmanovic

August 9 15	San Diego Wave FC	1–1	Angel City FC	San Diego, California
7:00 pm PT	McCaskill (yellow card) 61'; Robbe 85'	Report	Kennedy 90+2'; A. Thompson (yellow card) 90+4'	Stadium: Snapdragon Stadium; Attendance: 15,834; Referee: Abou Ndiaye

August 16 16	Bay FC	1–2	San Diego Wave FC	San Jose, California
7:00 pm PT	Huff (yellow card) 62'; Conti 75' (pen.)	Report	Ascanio 52'; Dali 63'; McNabb (yellow card) 72'; Morroni (yellow card) 89'	Stadium: PayPal Park; Attendance: 11,484; Referee: Joshua Encarnación

August 24 17	San Diego Wave FC	0–1	Racing Louisville FC	San Diego, California
5:00 pm PT		Report	Borges (yellow card) 22'; Flint (yellow card) 48'; Sears 59', (yellow card) 62'	Stadium: Snapdragon Stadium; Attendance: 12,966; Referee: Ekaterina Koroleva

August 29 18	Seattle Reign FC	0–0	San Diego Wave FC	Seattle, Washington
7:30 pm PT	Menti (yellow card) 37'	Report	McNabb (yellow card) 60'	Stadium: Lumen Field; Attendance: 9,974; Referee: Calin Radosav

September 7 19	San Diego Wave FC	0–3	Houston Dash	San Diego, California
5:30 pm PT	Armstrong (yellow card) 79'	Report	Larisey 17'; Ryan 45'; Patterson (yellow card) 51'; Bright 77'	Stadium: Snapdragon Stadium; Attendance: 15,626; Referee: Thomas Snyder

September 12 20	San Diego Wave FC	0–2	Gotham FC	San Diego, California
7:00 pm PT	Corley (yellow card) 67'	Report	Geyse 40'; González 45'; Sonnett (yellow card) 55'; Shaw 79'	Stadium: Snapdragon Stadium; Referee: Brandon Stevis

September 20 21	Portland Thorns FC	1–1	San Diego Wave FC	Portland, Oregon
7:00 pm PT	Turner (yellow card) 38'; Reyes 86'	Report	Corley (yellow card) 6'; McCaskill (yellow card) 32', (goal) 56'; Leon (yellow card) 49'; Armstrong (yellow card) 85'; Morroni (yellow card) 90+1'	Stadium: Providence Park; Referee: Nabil Bensalah

September 26 22	San Diego Wave FC	1–2	Orlando Pride	San Diego, California
7:30 pm PT	Dudinha 10'	Report	Ovalle 8'; Pickett 54'	Stadium: Snapdragon Stadium; Attendance: 11,660; Referee: Gerald Flores

October 5 23	Washington Spirit	2–1	San Diego Wave FC	Washington, D.C.
	Kouassi 9', 90+8'; Abiodun (yellow card) 69'	Report	Robbe (yellow card) 38'; Lundkvist (yellow card) 62'; Cascarino (yellow card) 71', (goal) 90+5'	Stadium: Audi Field; Attendance: 17,422; Referee: Greg Dopka

October 11 24	Utah Royals	2–3	San Diego Wave FC	Sandy, Utah
7:00 pm PT	Thomsen 9'; Lacasse (yellow card) 21'; Tanaka 54'; Monaghan (yellow card) 59'; Nagai (yellow card) 63'; Foederer (yellow card) 73'	Report	Lundkvist (yellow card) 23'; Dudinha 29'; Fazer (yellow card) 32'; Del Fava 45+1' (o.g.); Dali 72'	Stadium: America First Field; Attendance: 8,959; Referee: Danielle Chesky

October 18 25	San Diego Wave FC	6–1	Chicago Stars FC	San Diego, California
7:00 pm PT	Cascarino 7'; Staab 15' (o.g.); Dudinha 18', 57'; McNabb 44'; Dali 83'	Report	Ludmila (yellow card) 50'; Franklin 71'	Stadium: Snapdragon Stadium; Attendance: 16,920; Referee: Atahan Yaya

November 2 26	Kansas City Current	2–1	San Diego Wave FC	Kansas City, Missouri
12:00 pm PT	I. Rodriguez (yellow card) 23'; Cooper (yellow card) 45+2'; Debinha 54'; Prince 75'	Report	Dudinha 8'; Dali (yellow card) 28'	Stadium: CPKC Stadium; Attendance: 11,500; Referee: Jaclyn Metz

==== Regular-season standings ====
Pos	Team	Pld	W	D	L	GF	GA	GD	Pts	Qualification
4	Orlando Pride	26	11	7	8	33	27	+6	40	Playoffs
5	Seattle Reign FC	26	10	9	7	32	29	+3	39	Playoffs
6	San Diego Wave FC	26	10	7	9	41	34	+7	37	Playoffs
7	Racing Louisville FC	26	10	7	9	35	38	−3	37	Playoffs
8	Gotham FC (C)	26	9	9	8	35	25	+10	36	Playoffs and CONCACAF W Champions Cup

Source: NWSL
Rules for classification: 1) points; 2) total goal difference; 3) total wins; 4) total goals scored; 5) head-to-head points; 6) head-to-head goals scored; 7) fewest disciplinary points; 8) coin toss (if 2 clubs tied) or drawing of lots (if ≥3 clubs tied).
(C) Champions

==== Results summary ====
Overall								Home						Away					
Pld	W	D	L	GF	GA	GD	Pts	W	D	L	GF	GA	GD	W	D	L	GF	GA	GD
26	10	7	9	41	33	+8	37	4	3	6	20	20	0	6	4	3	21	13	+8

Last updated: November 9, 2025.
Source: NWSLsoccer.com

===== Results by matchday =====
Matchday	1	2	3	4	5	6	7	8	9	10	11	12	13	14	15	16	17	18	19	20	21	22	23	24	25	26
Ground	A	H	A	H	A	A	H	H	A	H	H	A	H	A	H	A	H	A	H	H	A	H	A	A	H	A
Result	D	W	L	L	W	W	W	D	W	W	L	W	D	D	D	W	L	D	L	L	D	L	L	W	W	L
Position (Note: SAN's position at the end of the matchweek, not their match.)	9	4	5	9	6	5	3	4	2	2	4	3	3	4	4	2	3	3	3	5	5	7	8	6	5	6

Updated to match(es) played on November 9, 2025. Source: NWSLsoccer.com
A = Away; H = Home; W = Win; D = Draw; L = Loss

=== Playoffs ===
Quarterfinals
1	Kansas City Current	1
8	Gotham FC (a.e.t.)	2
4	Orlando Pride	2
5	Seattle Reign FC	0
2	Washington Spirit (p)	1 (3)
7	Racing Louisville FC	1 (1)
3	Portland Thorns FC (a.e.t.)	1
6	San Diego Wave FC	0

Semifinals
8	Gotham FC	1
4	Orlando Pride	0
2	Washington Spirit	2
3	Portland Thorns FC	0

Championship
8	Gotham FC	1
2	Washington Spirit	0

November 9 Quarterfinals	Portland Thorns FC	1–0 (a.e.t.)	San Diego Wave	Portland, Oregon
12:00 pm PT	Torpey (yellow card) 45'; Moultrie (yellow card) 90+10'; Turner 94'	Report	Morroni (yellow card) 48'; Leon (yellow card) 120+3'	Stadium: Providence Park; Attendance: 19,309; Referee: Thomas Snyder

=== Friendlies ===
July 12	San Diego Wave FC	1–1	Utah Royals	San Diego, California
5:00 pm PT	McNabb	Report	Dorsey	Stadium: Torero Stadium

July 20	Utah Royals	2–2	San Diego Wave FC	Sandy, Utah
6:30 pm PT	Del Fava; Solórzano	Report	Carusa	Stadium: America First Field

== Statistics ==
=== Appearances and goals ===
Starting appearances are listed first, followed by substitute appearances after the + symbol where applicable.

No.	Pos	Nat	Player	Total		NWSL		Playoffs	
No.	Pos	Nat	Player	Apps	Goals	Apps	Goals	Apps	Goals
Goalkeepers
1	GK	(Canada) CAN	Kailen Sheridan	25	0	24	0	1	0
22	GK	(United States) USA	Hillary Beall	0	0	0	0	0	0
31	GK	(Bosnia and Herzegovina) BIH	DiDi Haračić	2	0	2	0	0	0
Defenders
3	DF	(United States) USA	Trinity Armstrong	24	1	18+5	1	0+1	0
6	DF	(Sweden) SWE	Hanna Lundkvist	27	1	24+2	1	1	0
12	DF	(United States) USA	Kennedy Wesley	23	1	20+2	1	1	0
14	DF	(United States) USA	Kristen McNabb	24	2	19+4	2	1	0
23	DF	(United States) USA	Nya Harrison	1	0	0+1	0	0	0
30	DF	(Colombia) COL	Daniela Arias	2	0	0+2	0	0	0
34	DF	(United States) USA	Quincy McMahon	8	0	0+7	0	0+1	0
75	DF	(France) FRA	Perle Morroni	26	1	23+2	1	1	0
Midfielders
10	MF	(France) FRA	Kenza Dali	27	5	26	5	1	0
11	MF	(Germany) GER	Gia Corley	25	2	21+3	2	1	0
17	MF	(United States) USA	Kimmi Ascanio	27	4	17+9	4	1	0
18	MF	(France) FRA	Laurina Fazer	10	0	6+3	0	1	0
21	MF	(United States) USA	Savannah McCaskill	21	1	20+1	1	0	0
28	MF	(United States) USA	Jordan Fusco	8	0	0+7	0	0+1	0
Forwards
5	FW	(United States) USA	Trinity Byars	1	0	0	0	0+1	0
8	FW	(Nigeria) NGA	Chiamaka Okwuchukwu	3	1	1+2	1	0	0
9	FW	(Canada) CAN	Adriana Leon	27	4	17+9	4	0+1	0
15	FW	(United States) USA	Makenzy Robbe	22	1	4+17	1	0+1	0
19	FW	(Republic of Ireland) IRL	Kyra Carusa	14	0	3+11	0	0	0
20	FW	(France) FRA	Delphine Cascarino	25	5	23+1	5	1	0
25	FW	(United States) USA	Melanie Barcenas	17	1	3+14	1	0	0
88	FW	(Brazil) BRA	Dudinha	11	5	7+3	5	1	0
Players away from the club on loan:
18	FW	(Canada) CAN	Mya Jones	0	0	0	0	0	0
—	DF	(Colombia) COL	Sintia Cabezas	0	0	0	0	0	0
Players who left the club during the season:
7	FW	(Mexico) MEX	María Sánchez	12	3	7+5	3	0	0
24	MF	(Nigeria) NGA	Favour Emmanuel	2	0	1+1	0	0	0
—	MF	(United States) USA	Ashlyn Miller	0	0	0	0	0	0
—	FW	(United States) USA	Ellie Ospeck	0	0	0	0	0	0
—	DF	(United States) USA	Emily Pringle	0	0	0	0	0	0
Own goals for:
—	—		Kate Del Fava (10/11 v. UTA)	0	1	0	1	0	0
—	—		Sam Staab (4/26, 10/18 v. CHI)	0	2	0	2	0	0

=== Assists ===
Rank	No.	Pos.	Nat.	Name	NWSL	Playoffs	Total
1	20	FW	(France)	Delphine Cascarino	6	0	6
2	75	DF	(France)	Perle Morroni	4	0	4
3	6	DF	(Sweden)	Hanna Lundkvist	3	0	3
3	9	FW	(Canada)	Adriana Leon	3	0	3
3	10	MF	(France)	Kenza Dali	3	0	3
3	11	MF	(Germany)	Gia Corley	3	0	3
4	3	DF	(United States)	Trinity Armstrong	2	0	2
4	7	FW	(Mexico)	María Sánchez	2	0	2
5	17	MF	(United States)	Kimmi Ascanio	1	0	1
5	19	FW	(Republic of Ireland)	Kyra Carusa	1	0	1
5	25	FW	(United States)	Melanie Barcenas	1	0	1
Total					29	0	29

=== Clean sheets ===
Rank	No.	Pos.	Nat.	Name	NWSL	Playoffs	Total
1	1	GK	(Canada)	Kailen Sheridan	5	0	5
Total					5	0	5

=== Disciplinary record ===
No.	Pos.	Nat.	Name	NWSL			Playoffs			Total		
No.	Pos.	Nat.	Name	Booked	(yellow card) (yellow-red card)	Sent off (straight red)	Booked	(yellow card) (yellow-red card)	Sent off (straight red)	Booked	(yellow card) (yellow-red card)	Sent off (straight red)
3	DF	(United States)	Trinity Armstrong	2	0	0	0	0	0	2	0	0
6	DF	(Sweden)	Hanna Lundkvist	2	0	0	0	0	0	2	0	0
7	FW	(Mexico)	María Sánchez	1	0	0	0	0	0	1	0	0
9	FW	(Canada)	Adriana Leon	2	0	0	1	0	0	3	0	0
10	MF	(France)	Kenza Dali	2	0	0	0	0	0	2	0	0
11	MF	(Germany)	Gia Corley	5	0	0	0	0	0	5	0	0
12	DF	(United States)	Kennedy Wesley	1	0	1	0	0	0	1	0	1
14	DF	(United States)	Kristen McNabb	3	0	0	0	0	0	3	0	0
15	FW	(United States)	Makenzy Robbe	1	0	0	0	0	0	1	0	0
17	MF	(United States)	Kimmi Ascanio	1	0	0	0	0	0	1	0	0
18	MF	(France)	Laurina Fazer	1	0	0	0	0	0	1	0	0
20	FW	(France)	Delphine Cascarino	2	0	0	0	0	0	2	0	0
21	MF	(United States)	Savannah McCaskill	4	0	0	0	0	0	4	0	0
24	MF	(Nigeria)	Favour Emmanuel	1	0	0	0	0	0	1	0	0
25	FW	(United States)	Melanie Barcenas	1	0	0	0	0	0	1	0	0
75	DF	(France)	Perle Morroni	3	0	0	1	0	0	4	0	0
Total				32	0	1	2	0	0	34	0	1

== Transactions ==
For incoming transfers, dates listed are when San Diego Wave FC officially signed the players to the roster. Transactions where only the rights to the players are acquired are not listed. For outgoing transfers, dates listed are when San Diego Wave FC officially removed the players from its roster, not when they signed with another team. If a player later signed with another team, their new team will be noted, but the date listed here remains the one when she was officially removed from the San Diego Wave FC roster.

=== Contract operations ===
Contract options
Date	Player	Pos.	Notes	Ref.
December 10, 2024	(Sweden) Hanna Lundkvist	DF	Mutual option exercised.	
January 21, 2025	(Republic of Ireland) Kyra Carusa	FW	Player option exercised.	

Re-signings
Date	Player	Pos.	Notes	Ref.
December 23, 2024	(United States) Hillary Beall	GK	Re-signed to a one-year contract through 2025.	
June 20, 2025	(United States) Jordan Fusco	MF	Re-signed through the end of the season.	
June 20, 2025	(United States) Nya Harrison	DF	Re-signed through the end of the season.	

=== Loans out ===
Date	Player	Pos.	Destination club	Fee/notes	Ref.
January 20, 2025	(Colombia) Sintia Cabezas	DF	(United States) Lexington SC	Loaned through the 2025 NWSL season.	
February 17, 2025	(Canada) Mya Jones	FW	(Canada) AFC Toronto	Loaned through the 2025 NWSL season.	
July 18, 2025	(Colombia) Sintia Cabezas	DF	(Spain) Levante UD	Loaned through the 2025–26 Liga F season.	

=== Transfers in ===
Date	Player	Pos.	Previous club	Fee/notes	Ref.
November 7, 2024	(United States) Trinity Byars	FW	(United States) Texas Longhorns	Free agent rookie signed through 2026 with an option for 2027.	
December 13, 2024	(United States) Quincy McMahon	DF	(United States) UCLA Bruins	Free agent rookie signed to a three-year contract through 2027.	
January 13, 2025	(Nigeria) Chiamaka Okwuchukwu	FW	(Nigeria) Rivers Angels F.C.	Acquired in exchange for an undisclosed fee and signed to a one-year contract through 2025.	
January 15, 2025	(Germany) Gia Corley	MF	(Germany) TSG Hoffenheim	Acquired in exchange for an undisclosed fee and signed to a two-year contract through 2026.	
January 16, 2025	(United States) Trinity Armstrong	DF	(United States) North Carolina Tar Heels	Free agent U18 rookie signed to a three-year contract through 2027.	
January 20, 2025	(Colombia) Sintia Cabezas	DF	(Colombia) América de Cali	Signed to a two-year contract through 2026.	
January 20, 2025	(Nigeria) Favour Emmanuel	MF	(Russia) Lokomotiv Moscow	Signed to a two-year contract through 2026 with a mutual option.	
January 20, 2025	(Bosnia and Herzegovina) DiDi Haračić	GK	(United States) Angel City FC	Free agent signed to a one-year contract through 2025.	
January 24, 2025	(France) Kenza Dali	MF	(England) Aston Villa	Acquired in exchange for an undisclosed fee and signed to a two-year contract through 2026.	
February 24, 2025	(Canada) Adriana Leon	FW	(England) Aston Villa	Acquired in exchange for an undisclosed fee and signed to a two-year contract through 2026 with a mutual option.	
March 12, 2025	(United States) Jordan Fusco	MF	(United States) Penn State Nittany Lions	Preseason trialists signed to short-term contracts through June 2025.	
March 12, 2025	(United States) Nya Harrison	DF	(United States) Stanford Cardinal	Preseason trialists signed to short-term contracts through June 2025.	
March 26, 2025	(Colombia) Daniela Arias	DF	(Brazil) Corinthians	Acquired in exchange for an undisclosed fee and signed to a two-year contract through 2026 with a mutual option.	
July 8, 2025	(United States) Ashlyn Miller	MF	(United States) Texas Longhorns	Signed to national team replacement player contracts.	
July 8, 2025	(United States) Ellie Ospeck	FW	(United States) Houston Dash	Signed to national team replacement player contracts.	
July 8, 2025	(United States) Emily Pringle	DF	(Australia) Brisbane Roar	Signed to national team replacement player contracts.	
July 24, 2025	(Brazil) Dudinha	FW	(Brazil) São Paulo	Acquired in exchange for an undisclosed fee and signed to a three-year contract through 2027.	
July 29, 2025	(France) Laurina Fazer	MF	(France) Paris Saint-Germain	Signed to a three-year contract through 2027.	

=== Transfers out ===
Date	Player	Pos.	Destination club	Fee/notes	Ref.
December 10, 2024	(United States) Christen Westphal	DF	(United States) Houston Dash	Traded in exchange for a 2025 international roster slot and $14,000 in allocation money, plus performance-based incentives.	
December 10, 2024	(United States) Amirah Ali	FW	(Spain) Valencia CF	Out of contract.	
December 10, 2024	(United States) Elyse Bennett	FW	(Spain) Deportivo de La Coruña	Out of contract.	
December 10, 2024	(United States) Danielle Colaprico	MF	(United States) Houston Dash	Out of contract.	
December 10, 2024	(United States) Morgan Messner	GK	(United States) Portland Thorns FC	Out of contract.	
January 3, 2025	(Australia) Emily van Egmond	MF	(England) Birmingham City	Mutual contract termination.	
January 14, 2025	(United States) Jaedyn Shaw	FW	(United States) North Carolina Courage	Traded in exchange for $300,000 in allocation money, $150,000 in intra-league transfer funds, an international roster slot for 2025 and 2026, and additional funds pending conditions met.	
January 26, 2025	(United States) Naomi Girma	DF	(England) Chelsea	Transferred in exchange for a world record fee of $1.1 million.	
March 5, 2025	(Australia) Kaitlyn Torpey	DF	(United States) Portland Thorns FC	Traded in exchange for either $10,000 in intra-league transfer funds or $15,000 in allocation money, pending conditions met.	
May 29, 2025	(Nigeria) Favour Emmanuel	MF	(Russia) Lokomotiv Moscow	Mutual contract termination.	
June 23, 2025	(Mexico) María Sánchez	FW	(Mexico) Tigres UANL	Transferred in exchange for an undisclosed fee.	
July 20, 2025	(United States) Ashlyn Miller	MF	(Australia) Brisbane Roar FC	National team replacement contracts expired.	
July 20, 2025	(United States) Ellie Ospeck	FW	(Czech Republic) Sparta Prague	National team replacement contracts expired.	
July 20, 2025	(United States) Emily Pringle	DF	(United States) Brooklyn FC	National team replacement contracts expired.	

=== Injury listings ===
Date	Player	Pos.	List	Injury	Ref.
March 12, 2025	(United States) Trinity Byars	FW	Season-ending injury	Knee injury suffered with the Texas Longhorns on September 1, 2024.	
July 30, 2025	(Nigeria) Chiamaka Okwuchukwu	FW	45-day injury	Lower leg injury.	

=== Preseason trialists ===
Trialists are non-rostered invitees during preseason and are not automatically signed. The Wave's preseason roster, which was released on January 21, 2025, initially did not list any non-rostered invitees. However, on January 30, former college players Jordan Fusco and Caroline Kelly were announced as trialists. Additionally, during the Coachella Valley Invitational, preseason trialists Pearl Cecil, Nya Harrison, Simone Jackson, and Jaiden Rodriguez competed for the Wave.

Player	Pos.	Previous club	Status	Ref.
(United States) Pearl Cecil	DF	(United States) San Diego Surf SC	U18 trialist not signed.	
(United States) Jordan Fusco	MF	(United States) Penn State Nittany Lions	Signed.	
(United States) Nya Harrison	DF	(United States) Stanford Cardinal	Signed.	
(United States) Simone Jackson	FW	(United States) USC Trojans	Not signed.	
(United States) Caroline Kelly	FW	(United States) TCU Horned Frogs	Not signed.	
(United States) Jaiden Rodriguez	MF	(United States) San Diego Surf SC	U18 trialist not signed.	

== Awards ==
=== NWSL monthly awards ===
==== Best XI of the Month ====
Month	Nat.	Pos.	Player	Ref.
March	(Germany)	MF	Gia Corley	
April	(France)	FW	Delphine Cascarino	
April	(France)	MF	Kenza Dali	
May	(United States)	DF	Trinity Armstrong	
June	(France)	MF	Kenza Dali (2)	
August	(France)	MF	Kenza Dali (3)	
September	(France)	MF	Kenza Dali (4)	

==== Coach of the Month ====
Month	Nat.	Coach	Ref.
May	(Sweden)	Jonas Eidevall	

=== NWSL weekly awards ===
==== Player of the Week ====
Wk.	Nat.	Player	Won	Ref.
1	(France)	Delphine Cascarino	Nom.	
2	(Germany)	Gia Corley	Won	
5	(France)	Delphine Cascarino	Won	
7	(France)	Kenza Dali	Nom.	
9	(France)	Perle Morroni	Nom.	
10	(Canada)	Adriana Leon	Won	
16	(France)	Kenza Dali	Nom.	
24	(Brazil)	Dudinha	Nom.	

==== Assist of the Week ====
Wk.	Nat.	Player	Won	Ref.
2	(Germany)	Gia Corley	Nom.	
3	(France)	Kenza Dali	Nom.	
5	(France)	Delphine Cascarino	Won	
7	(Mexico)	María Sánchez	Nom.	
8	(France)	Perle Morroni	Nom.	
10	(France)	Delphine Cascarino	Nom.	
23	(Republic of Ireland)	Kyra Carusa	Nom.	

==== Goal of the Week ====
Wk.	Nat.	Player	Won	Ref.
3	(Nigeria)	Chiamaka Okwuchukwu	Nom.	
5	(France)	Kenza Dali	Nom.	
10	(Canada)	Adriana Leon	Won	
16	(France)	Kenza Dali	Nom.	
22	(Brazil)	Dudinha	Nom.	

==== Save of the Week ====
Wk.	Nat.	Player	Won	Ref.
1	(Canada)	Kailen Sheridan	Won	
3	(Canada)	Kailen Sheridan	Nom.	
5	(Canada)	Kailen Sheridan (2)	Won	
8	(Canada)	Kailen Sheridan	Nom.	
13	(Canada)	Kailen Sheridan	Nom.	
15	(Canada)	Kailen Sheridan	Nom.	
23	(Canada)	Kailen Sheridan	Nom.	
