= Kennedy Wesley =

American soccer player (born 2001)

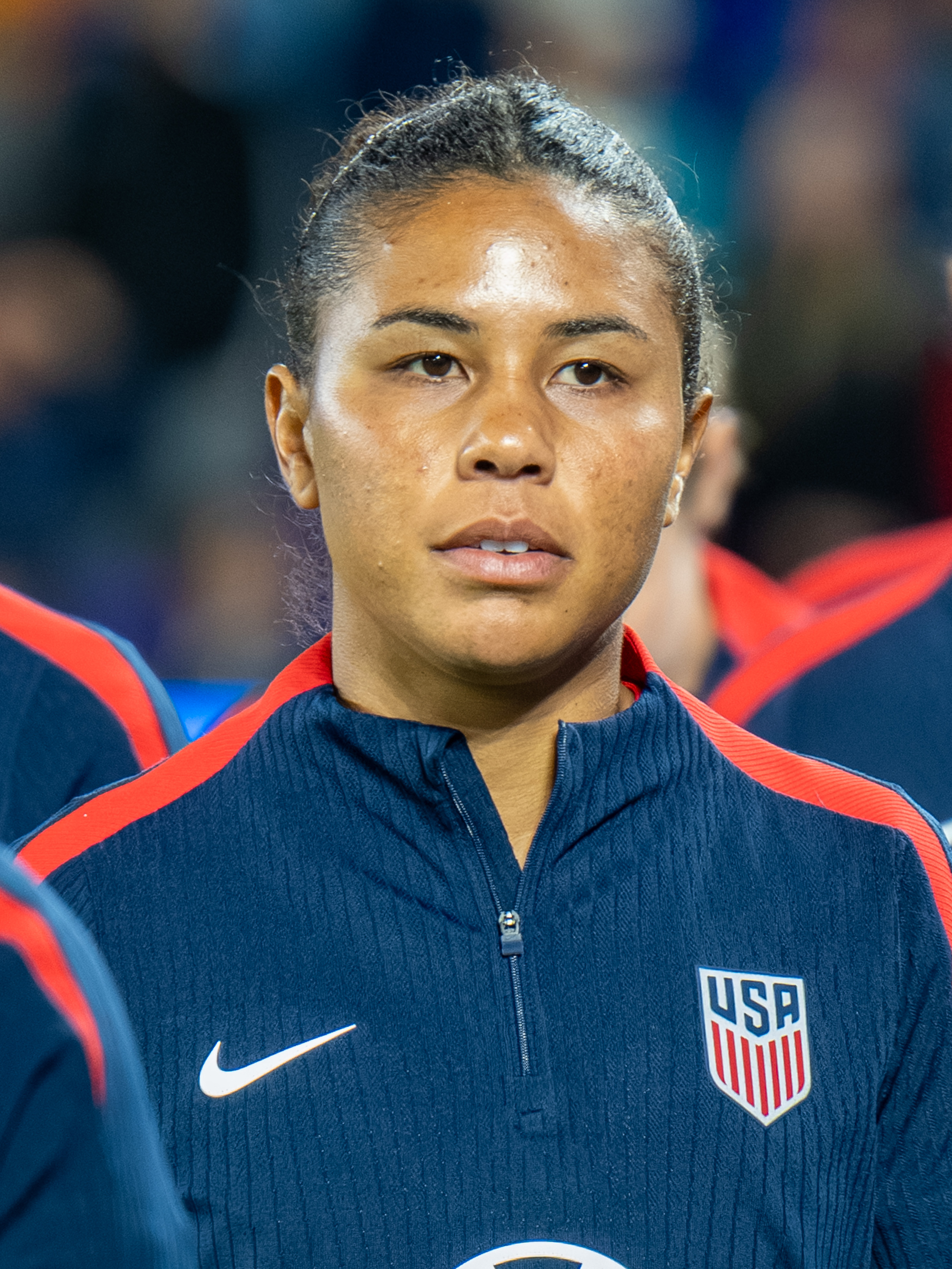
- Wesley with the United States in 2025

Personal information
- Full name: Kennedy Megan Wesley
- Date of birth: March 8, 2001 (age 25)
- Place of birth: Santa Monica, California, United States
- Height: 5 ft 5 in (1.65 m)
- Position: Center back

Team information
- Current team: San Diego Wave
- Number: 2

Youth career
- SoCal Blues

College career
| Years | Team | Apps | (Gls) |
| 2019–2023 | Stanford Cardinal | 104 | (4) |

Senior career*
| Years | Team | Apps | (Gls) |
| 2024– | San Diego Wave | 65 | (4) |

International career^{‡}
| 2016–2018 | United States U–17 | 13 | (1) |
| 2020 | United States U–20 | 5 | (1) |
| 2025 | United States U–23 | 1 | (0) |
| 2025– | United States | 9 | (1) |
- * Club domestic league appearances and goals as of 16:45, November 15, 2026 (UTC) ‡ National team caps and goals as of October 13, 2026

Kennedy Megan Wesley (born March 8, 2001) is an American professional soccer player who plays as a center back for San Diego Wave FC of the National Women's Soccer League (NWSL) and the United States national team. She played college soccer for the Stanford Cardinal, winning the 2019 national championship and setting the program record for career appearances.

== Early life ==
Wesley was born in Santa Monica, California, to Kristen and Kevin Wesley. In her youth, she participated in both soccer and gymnastics before committing fully to soccer at age 13. She attended Valley Christian High School, where she helped the team win a California state championship in 2017. The same season, she was named the Gatorade National Girls Soccer Player of the Year after scoring 22 goals and tallying 9 assists in her sophomore high school season. She played club soccer for SoCal Blues, with which she won the 2015 ECNL U15 National Championship. Wesley's play with the SoCal blues helped her gain attention with the Olympic Development Program and earn time on United States youth national teams.

== College career ==
Wesley played college soccer for the Stanford Cardinal over five seasons from 2019 to 2023. She played in all 25 games as a freshman, operating mainly as a left back. Her playing time increased as the year went on, and she ended up starting 13 of the Cardinal's final 14 matches of the year. She helped contribute to Stanford's 2019 NCAA tournament victory, playing in all of the squad's NCAA matches. During the college cup final, she converted a must-score penalty shot past North Carolina goalkeeper Claudia Dickey that helped Stanford win the shootout, 5–4. At the end of the year, she was named to the All-Pac-12 Freshman Team alongside teammate Maya Doms.

In her sophomore season, Wesley started all 13 matches in which she played. She operated as a center back, playing every minute of 8 games. The following year, her playing time increased to 19 games (18 starts). She synergized with the Cardinal backline to produce 9 shutouts on the year. Wesley was recognized for her efforts with a spot on the All Pac-12 third team.

As a senior, Wesley was named team captain, a position she would maintain control of until her departure from Stanford. She started all 22 of the Cardinal's matches and accumulated the second-highest minutes of any field player in the squad. Wesley was named to the All-Pac 12 second team after leading the team to a Pac-12 Championship, the second of her college career.

Wesley returned to Stanford for a fifth year in 2023. Once again, she started all of the team's matches and logged the second-highest minutes for a field player. During the Cardinal's opening match, she netted her first collegiate goal, scoring from distance in a 4–0 victory over the San Diego Toreros. Wesley would go on to score three more goals over the course of the season, reaching a career high. She completed her ascendancy with her first All-Pac-12 first team honor and a recognition on the All-Region third team as well. Of a possible 106 career appearances, she played in 104 games, setting a school record. Her 92 starts, including in the final 60 matches of her college career, were 9th highest in Stanford history.

== Club career ==
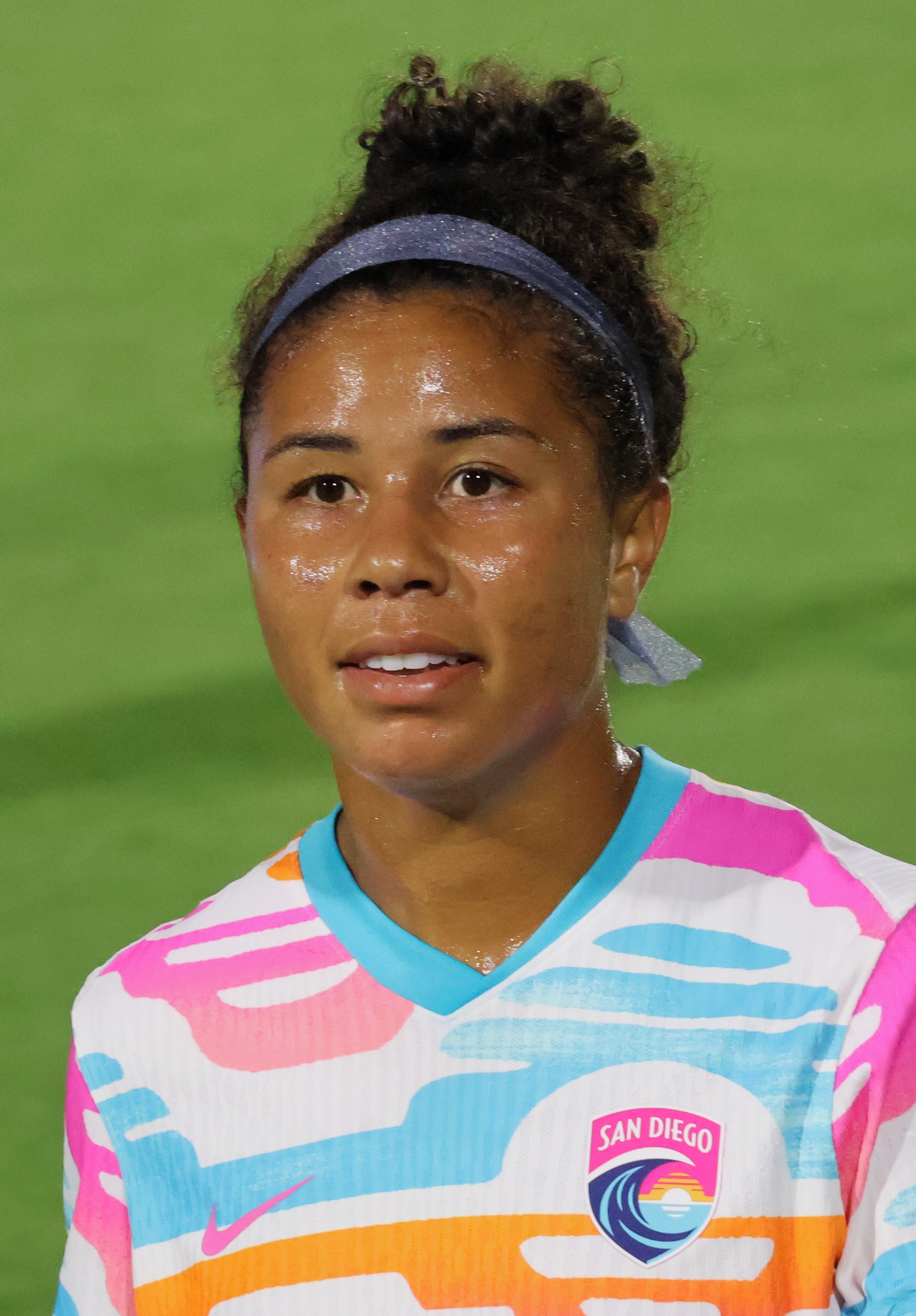
Wesley with San Diego in 2025

Wesley was selected in the first round (12th overall) of the 2024 NWSL Draft by San Diego Wave FC. On February 8, 2024, San Diego signed her to her first professional deal, a two-year contract through 2025. She made her club debut in a scoreless draw against Racing Louisville on April 13, starting in place of the injured Naomi Girma. Wesley scored her first professional goal on July 20, in a NWSL x Liga MX Femenil Summer Cup match against Bay FC. She tallied her first NWSL regular season goal on September 8, scoring San Diego's lone goal in teammate Alex Morgan's final match, a 4–1 defeat to the North Carolina Courage. Both her Summer Cup and NWSL goals were header goals from María Sánchez corner kicks. In September 2024, Wesley was named the NWSL Rookie of the Month after sporting strong defensive statistics.

On May 4, 2025, Wesley scored the opening goal in a 2–1 victory over Bay FC. It marked her third goal in a row from a María Sánchez corner kick. As the season progressed, she continued to earn playing time and, across 12 of the San Diego's first 13 matches of the year, sported the highest average passing accuracy in the squad. In August, the Wave re-signed Wesley to a three-year contract lasting through the end of 2028. She finished the 2025 season having played in 22 matches as San Diego finished in sixth place and qualified for the playoffs, where they faced off against the Portland Thorns in the quarterfinals. Wesley played all 120 minutes of the match and recorded a shot that hit off the crossbar as the Wave lost in extra time, 1–0.

Wesley kicked off her third professional season on a positive note, earning her first NWSL Team of the Month honor for March 2026 after helping San Diego concede only three goals across their opening four matches. On July 4, 2026, she registered her first NWSL assist, passing the ball to Melanie Barcenas in a 2–0 win over Gotham FC.

== International career ==
=== Youth ===
Wesley has represented the United States at multiple youth levels. In the fall of 2016, she was a member of the under-17 team that won the 2016 CONCACAF Women's U-17 Championship and consequently qualified for the 2016 FIFA U-17 Women's World Cup. Wesley herself was named to the tournament's Best XI. She also participated in the ensuing World Cup, in which the team was eliminated in the group stage. The following year, she repeated the cycle with the U-17 squad, playing in the 2018 CONCACAF Women's U-17 Championship and scoring her first youth national team goal in the process. However, she suffered an injury in the lead-up to the 2018 FIFA U-17 Women's World Cup and was not able to participate in the tournament.

In 2020, Wesley was a member of the under-20 team that won gold at the 2020 CONCACAF Women's U-20 Championship. She earned her first U-20 cap in the first game of the competition, a 9–0 drubbing of Cuba. During the tournament, she tallied her first U-20 goal after heading in a cross from eventual Stanford teammate Katie Duong to help the United States win their quarterfinal match over Canada.

While in her second year playing in the NWSL with the San Diego Wave, Wesley received a call-up to the under-23 squad for two friendlies against Germany.

=== Senior ===
Emma Hayes handed Wesley her first call-up to the senior national team in October 2025. She made her senior international debut on October 29, 2025, starting in a 6–0 victory over New Zealand. On April 17, 2026, Wesley recorded her first international goal contributions, assisting former Stanford and San Diego Wave teammate Naomi Girma in a victory over Japan before scoring a goal of her own later on in the match.

== Career statistics ==
=== Club ===
As of November 15, 2025

Appearances and goals by club, season and competition
| Club | Season | League | | | Cup (Note: Includes the NWSL Challenge Cup.) | | Playoffs (Note: Includes NWSL Playoffs.) | | Continental (Note: Includes CONCACAF W Champions Cup.) | | Other | | Total | |
| Club | Season | Division | Apps | Goals | Apps | Goals | Apps | Goals | Apps | Goals | Apps | Goals | Apps | Goals |
|---|---|---|---|---|---|---|---|---|---|---|---|---|---|---|
| San Diego Wave FC | 2024 | NWSL | 13 | 1 | 0 | 0 | — | | 2 | 0 | 1 (Note: Appearances in the NWSL x Liga MX Femenil Summer Cup.) | 1 | 16 | 2 |
| San Diego Wave FC | 2025 | NWSL | 22 | 1 | — | | 1 | 0 | — | | — | | 23 | 1 |
| Career total | | | 35 | 2 | 0 | 0 | 1 | 0 | 2 | 0 | 1 | 1 | 39 | 3 |

=== International ===
As of match played October 13, 2026

| National Team | Year | Apps | Goals |
|---|---|---|---|
| United States | 2025 | 2 | 0 |
| United States | 2026 | 7 | 1 |
| Total | | 9 | 1 |

International goal scored by Kennedy Wesley
| No. | Cap | Date | Venue | Opponent | Score | Result | Competition | Ref. |
|---|---|---|---|---|---|---|---|---|
| 1 | 6 | April 17, 2026 | Dick's Sporting Goods Park, Commerce City, Colorado, U.S. | Japan | 3–0 | 3–0 | Friendly | |

== Honors ==
Stanford Cardinal

- NCAA Division I women's soccer championship: 2019; runner-up: 2023
- Pac-12 Championship: 2019, 2022

San Diego Wave

- NWSL Challenge Cup: 2024

United States

- SheBelieves Cup: 2026

United States U17

- CONCACAF Women's U-17 Championship: 2016

United States U20

- CONCACAF Women's U-20 Championship: 2020

Individual

- 2019 All Pac-12 freshman team
- 2021 All Pac-12 third team
- 2022 All Pac-12 second team
- 2022 United Coaches All-Region first team
- 2023 United Coaches All-Region third team
- 2023 All Pac-12 first team
- NWSL Rookie of the Month: September 2024
- NWSL Best XI Second Team: 2026
