= Jordan Fusco =

American soccer player (born 2003)

- Fusco with the San Diego Wave in 2026

Personal information
- Full name: Jordan Michelle Fusco
- Date of birth: September 11, 2003 (age 23)
- Height: 5 ft 9 in (1.75 m)
- Position: Midfielder

Team information
- Current team: Racing Louisville (on loan from the San Diego Wave)
- Number: 28

Youth career
- Internationals SC

College career
Years	Team	Apps	(Gls)
2021–2023	Tennessee Volunteers	61	(14)
2024	Penn State Nittany Lions	25	(3)

Senior career*
Years	Team	Apps	(Gls)
2025–	San Diego Wave	16	(0)
2025–2026	→ Tampa Bay Sun (loan)	4	(2)
2026–	→ Racing Louisville (loan)	0	(0)
- * Club domestic league appearances and goals as of September 7, 2026

Jordan Michelle Fusco (born September 11, 2003) is an American professional soccer player who plays as a midfielder for Racing Louisville FC of the National Women's Soccer League (NWSL), on loan from the San Diego Wave. She played college soccer for the Tennessee Volunteers and the Penn State Nittany Lions.

== Early life ==
Fusco grew up in Olmsted Township, Ohio, the oldest of two children born to Janae and Scott Fusco. She attended Olmsted Falls High School, where she played two seasons of high school soccer, earning all-state honors. She played club soccer for Internationals SC alongside future Tennessee teammate Taylor Huff, earning ECNL All-American honors in 2021. She committed to Tennessee as a junior.

== College career ==
Fusco appeared in 23 games, 15 as a starter, in her freshman season with the Tennessee Volunteers in 2021, scoring 4 goals and adding 5 assists. She helped Tennessee win the SEC tournament, defeating top-seeded Arkansas in the final. She scored Tennessee's NCAA tournament opener as they made the second round. She started all 19 games as a sophomore in 2022, scoring 4 goals with 1 assist and helping Tennessee top the SEC East standings. She scored 6 goals with 4 assists in 19 games as a junior in 2023, earning first-team All-SEC honors.

Fusco transferred to the Penn State Nittany Lions for her senior season in 2024; Brian Pensky, the coach who had recruited her to Tennessee, had left for Florida State in 2022. She started all 25 games, scored 3 goals, and provided a career-high 12 assists, the most by a Nittany Lion since Sam Coffey's 12 assists in 2020. She earned second-team All-Big Ten honors and helped Penn State reach the quarterfinals of the NCAA tournament.

== Club career ==
After being invited as a non-roster trialist in the preseason, Fusco signed her first professional contract with San Diego Wave FC on March 12, 2025, agreeing to a short-term deal through June. She made her professional debut on April 19, coming on as a stoppage-time substitute for Kenza Dali in a 4–1 win over Racing Louisville. On June 20, the Wave signed her through the end of the season. She totaled seven regular-season appearances as a rookie. In the playoffs, she replaced an injured Gia Corley to play both extra time periods in a 1–0 quarterfinal loss to the Portland Thorns.

On December 17, 2025, Fusco signed a two-year contract extension with the Wave. The same day, she joined Tampa Bay Sun on loan for the rest of the USL Super League season. She scored her first professional goal in her Tampa Bay debut three days later in a 3–1 loss to Sporting JAX. On March 9, 2026, she was recalled to her parent club before the NWSL season opener, having scored 2 goals in 4 games on loan.

On September 9, 2026, Fusco was sent on loan to fellow NWSL club Racing Louisville with the option to buy at the end of the year.

== Career statistics ==
=== Club ===
As of September 7, 2026

Appearances and goals by club, season and competition
Club	Season	League			Playoffs		Total	
Club	Season	Division	Apps	Goals	Apps	Goals	Apps	Goals
San Diego Wave FC	2025	NWSL	7	0	1	0	8	0
San Diego Wave FC	2026	NWSL	9	0	—		9	0
San Diego Wave FC	Total		16	0	1	0	17	0
Tampa Bay Sun FC (loan)	2025–26	USL Super League	4	2	—		4	2
Racing Louisville FC (loan)	2026	NWSL	0	0	—		0	0
Career total			20	2	1	0	21	2

== Honors and awards ==
Tennessee Volunteers

- Southeastern Conference tournament: 2021

Individual

- First-team All-SEC: 2023
- Second-team All-Big Ten: 2024
- SEC all-freshman team: 2021
