= Chiamaka Okwuchukwu =

Nigerian footballer (born 2005)

Personal information
- Full name: Chiamaka Cristabel Okwuchukwu
- Date of birth: August 7, 2005 (age 21)
- Height: 1.60 m (5 ft 3 in)
- Position: Forward

Senior career*
Years	Team	Apps	(Gls)
- Rivers Angels
2025	San Diego Wave	3	(1)

International career^{‡}
2022–2024	Nigeria U-20	8+	(2+)
- * Club domestic league appearances and goals as of 30 July 2025 ‡ National team caps and goals as of 12 September 2024

Chiamaka Cristabel Okwuchukwu (born 7 August 2005) is a Nigerian professional footballer who plays as a forward. She has represented Nigeria at the youth international level.

== Club career ==
She was born on the 7th of August, 2005, as the seventh of eight children growing up in the town of Njaba. She has played for seven-time NWFL Premiership champions Rivers Angels.

=== San Diego Wave ===
On 13 January 2025, the NWSL's San Diego Wave FC announced that they had signed Okwuchukwu on a one-year contract, transferring her for an undisclosed fee from Rivers Angels. She scored her first NWSL goal less than two minutes into her debut, which occurred in a 2–1 defeat to the Orlando Pride on 29 March 2025. Okwuchukwu earned her first start with the Wave in the following game, a 2–0 defeat to the Kansas City Current. She made one more appearance with the Wave in 2025 before a leg injury forced her to miss the remainder of the season. At the end of the year, Okwuchukwu departed from San Diego upon the expiration of her contract.

== International career ==
Okwuchukwu played in all four games (two starts) for Nigeria at the 2022 FIFA U-20 Women's World Cup at age 16, helping them top their group before falling to the Netherlands in the quarterfinals. The following cycle, appeared in all four games (three starts) at the 2024 FIFA U-20 Women's World Cup, recording two goals and one assist during the group stage; she scored and had a goal called offside in a 3–1 loss to Germany and assisted and scored the first two goals in a 4–0 win against Venezuela. When she scored against Germany, she emulated the celebration of her idol Cristiano Ronaldo. Nigeria finished second in their group and lost to eventual finalists Japan in the first knockout round. For her performance, Okwuchukwu was one of three finalists for CAF Youth Women's Player of the Year in 2024, losing to Morocco's Doha El Madani.
