= Nya Harrison =

American soccer player (born 2002)

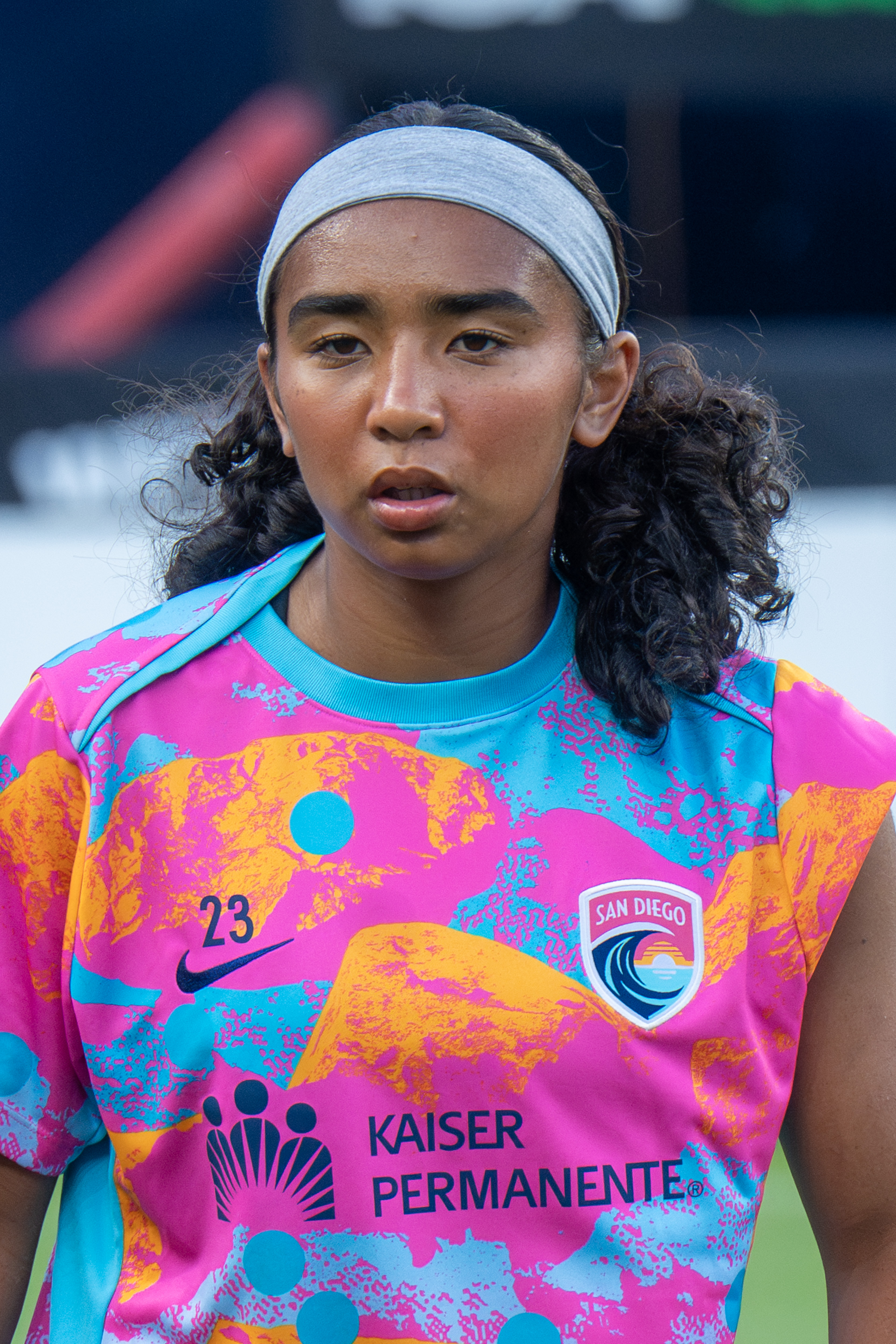
- Harrison with San Diego Wave in 2026

Personal information
- Full name: Nya Layson Harrison
- Date of birth: November 9, 2002 (age 24)
- Place of birth: San Diego, California, U.S.
- Height: 5 ft 4 in (1.63 m)
- Position: Right back

Team information
- Current team: San Diego Wave
- Number: 23

Youth career
- 2017–2021: San Diego Surf

College career
Years	Team	Apps	(Gls)
2021–2024	Stanford Cardinal	58	(3)

Senior career*
Years	Team	Apps	(Gls)
2025–	San Diego Wave	5	(0)

International career
2018	United States U16		
2020	United States U18	1+	(0)
- * Club domestic league appearances and goals as of 16:42, November 15, 2026 (UTC)

Nya Layson Harrison (born November 9, 2002) is a professional soccer player who plays as a right back for San Diego Wave FC of the National Women's Soccer League (NWSL). Born in the United States, she has been called up to the Philippines national team. She played college soccer for the Stanford Cardinal.

== Early life ==
Harrison was born and raised in San Diego, California. She played varsity soccer as a forward in her freshman year at Del Norte High School. She played club soccer for San Diego Surf, helping her team to runner-up finishes for DA and ECNL national titles. She committed to play college soccer for the Stanford Cardinal in her sophomore year. TopDrawerSoccer ranked her as the 21st-best prospect in the 2021 class.

== College career ==
Harrison played in 6 games and scored 1 goal for the Stanford Cardinal as a freshman in 2021, then made 9 appearances as a sophomore in 2022. She earned a larger role in her junior year in 2023, playing in 20 games with 11 starts and scoring 1 goal. She played in three games off the bench during the NCAA tournament as Stanford lost to Florida State in the final, ending their otherwise undefeated season. In her senior year in 2024, she started all 23 games and scored 1 goal while contributing to 12 shutouts during the program's first year in the Atlantic Coast Conference. She helped Stanford reach the NCAA tournament semifinals, losing to Wake Forest.

== Club career ==
San Diego Wave FC announced on March 12, 2025, that the club had signed Harrison to a short-term contract through June. She was the first Filipinas player to sign a contract in the NWSL. On June 20, the club re-signed her for the rest of the year. She made her professional debut on October 18, coming on as a stoppage-time substitute for Dudinha in a playoff-clinching 6–1 victory over the Chicago Stars.

On January 2, 2026, the Wave announced that Harrison had signed a one-year contract extension.

== International career ==
Harrison trained with the United States youth national team at the under-16 and under-18 levels.

In February 2025, Harrison was called into training camp with the Philippines national team.

== Personal life ==
Harrison is one of three daughters born to Sherill and Derrick Harrison. Her mother immigrated to the United States from the Philippines, and her father is African American. She is a cousin of former NFL player Jashon Sykes.

In December 2023, alongside Sedona Prince and DeWayne Carter, Harrison filed suit against the National Collegiate Athletic Association (NCAA) seeking to challenge NCAA restrictions on student athlete compensation.

== Honors and awards ==
Stanford Cardinal

- Pac-12 Conference: 2022
