= Kimmi Ascanio =

American soccer player (born 2008)

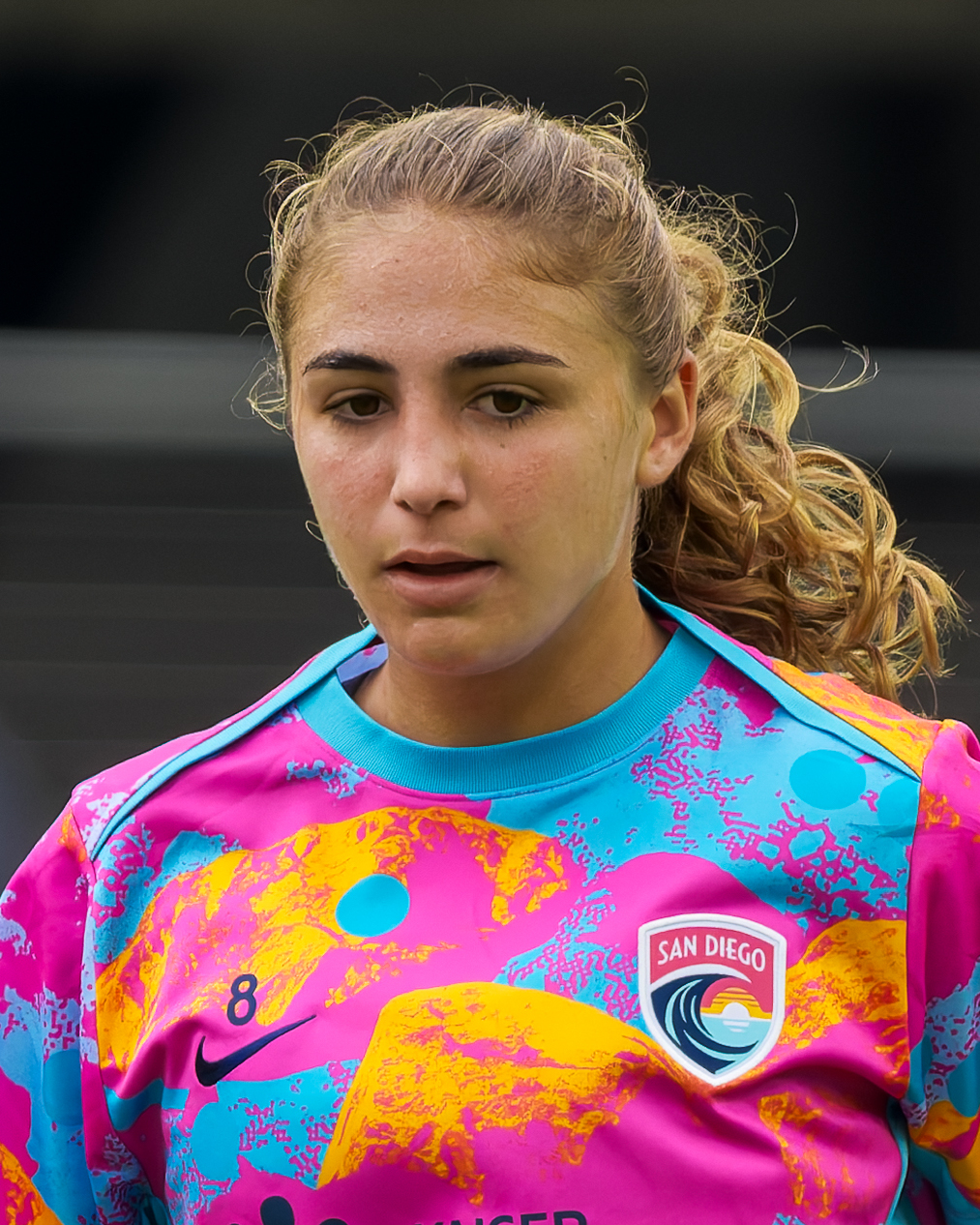
- Ascanio with the San Diego Wave in 2026

Personal information
- Full name: Kimmi Ascanio
- Date of birth: January 21, 2008 (age 18)
- Place of birth: Orlando, Florida, U.S.
- Height: 5 ft 5 in (1.65 m)
- Positions: Midfielder; forward

Team information
- Current team: San Diego Wave
- Number: 8

Youth career
- Florida United

Senior career*
Years	Team	Apps	(Gls)
2024–	San Diego Wave	60	(5)

International career^{‡}
2022	United States U-15		
2024–2025	United States U-17	18	(6)
2025–	United States U-19	2	(1)
2025–	United States U-23	1	(0)
Medal record
Women's soccer
FIFA U-17 Women's World Cup
Bronze medal – third place	Dominican Republic 2024
- * Club domestic league appearances and goals as of 16:38, November 15, 2026 (UTC) ‡ National team caps and goals as of October 28, 2025

Kimmi Ascanio (born January 21, 2008) is an American professional soccer player who plays as a midfielder or forward for San Diego Wave FC of the National Women's Soccer League (NWSL). She signed with the Wave at age 16 in 2024. She won bronze with the United States at the 2024 FIFA U-17 Women's World Cup.

== Early life ==
Ascanio was born in Orlando and raised in Doral, Florida. Her parents were born and raised in Venezuela, her father in Caracas and her mother in Valencia. She played UPSL club soccer for Florida United SC, winning two state titles. Her idol growing up was Tobin Heath; she later drew comparisons to the player.

== Club career ==
San Diego Wave FC announced on March 22, 2024, that the club had signed Ascanio to her first professional contract on a three-year deal through the NWSL's Under-18 Entry Mechanism. She made her professional debut on April 13, coming on as a second-half substitute in a 0–0 draw with Racing Louisville. Two weeks later, she made her first start and recorded her first assist in a 2–1 win over Bay FC, becoming the third-youngest goal contributor in NWSL history. On October 1, she returned from a lower leg injury after two months away, setting up the opening goal against Whitecaps Girls Elite in the CONCACAF W Champions Cup. She finished her rookie season with 9 appearances in all competitions.

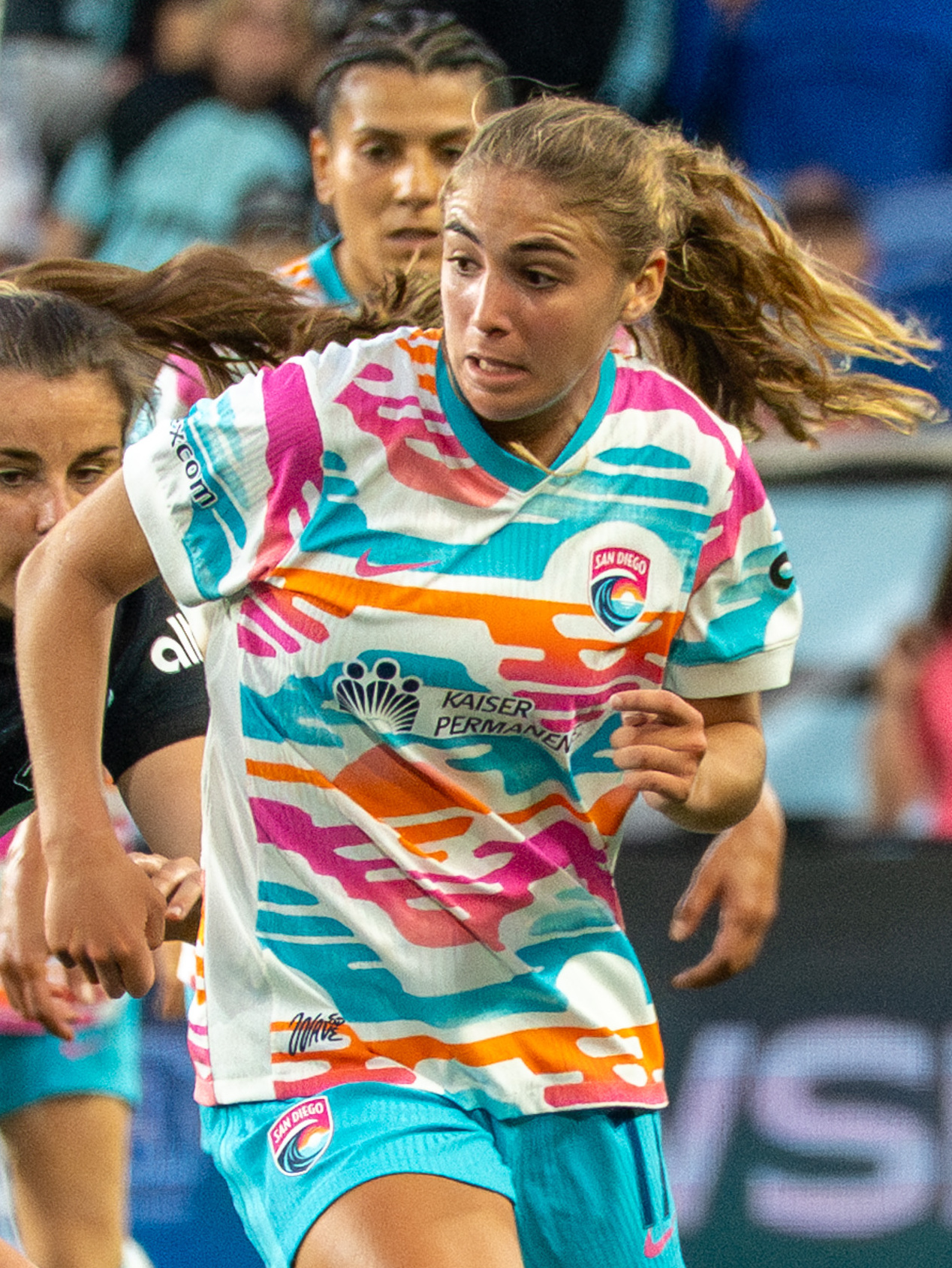
Ascanio playing for the Wave in 2025

On April 26, 2025, Ascanio scored her first professional goal against the Chicago Stars, sealing a 3–0 victory in stoppage time; in the game, she joined Trinity Armstrong and Melanie Barcenas as the first 17-year-old trio to start together in the NWSL. During this time, she recorded three goals and an assist in a five-game window, including the 1–0 game-winner against eventual champions Gotham FC. With that goal on May 16, she became the youngest NWSL player to score in consecutive matches and the second-youngest to score a game-winning goal. Under new head coach Jonas Eidevall, she finished the season appearing in all 27 matches and scoring 4 goals. San Diego placed sixth and lost 1–0 to the Portland Thorns in the playoff quarterfinals. At the end of the year, ESPN ranked her as the sixth-best teenager in the NWSL, calling her "free-flowing, smooth, confident ... a rare combination".

On May 15, 2026, Ascanio scored her first goal of the season against the Washington Spirit, scoring a late header to secure a 2–1 victory. Helping the Wave top the standings at the summer break, she was named to the NWSL Team of the Month for the first time in May. Eidevall said she had improved both offensively and defensively from the previous season. On August 2, she became the youngest NWSL player to make 50 regular-season appearances during a 1–0 win against the Spirit. The following week, she tied Christen Westphal's club record for consecutive appearances.

== International career ==
Ascanio helped the United States under-15 team win the 2022 CONCACAF Girls' U-15 Championship. She was the youngest player for the under-17 squad at the 2024 CONCACAF Women's U-17 Championship, where she scored a six-minute hat trick against Haiti in the semifinals and had a goal against Mexico in the final.

Ascanio started every game for the United States as they placed third at the 2024 FIFA U-17 Women's World Cup, their best result since 2008. She scored in a 2–0 win over Nigeria in the quarterfinals. While she was age-eligible for another cycle of the tournament, her club San Diego Wave did not release her for the 2025 FIFA U-17 Women's World Cup. She was also a "glaring absence" from the under-20 roster for the 2026 FIFA U-20 Women's World Cup.

== Career statistics ==
=== Club ===
As of November 11, 2025

Appearances and goals by club, season and competition
Club	Season	League			Cup (Note: Includes the NWSL Challenge Cup)		Playoffs (Note: Includes NWSL Playoffs.)		Continental (Note: Includes CONCACAF W Champions Cup)		Other		Total	
Club	Season	Division	Apps	Goals	Apps	Goals	Apps	Goals	Apps	Goals	Apps	Goals	Apps	Goals
San Diego Wave FC	2024	NWSL	6	0	0	0	—		1	0	2 (Note: Includes NWSL x Liga MX Femenil Summer Cup)	0	9	0
San Diego Wave FC	2025	NWSL	26	4	—		1	0	—		—		27	4
Career total			32	4	0	0	1	0	1	0	2	0	36	4

== Honors ==
United States U-15

- CONCACAF Girls' U-15 Championship: 2022

United States U-17

- CONCACAF Women's U-17 Championship: 2024
- FIFA U-17 Women's World Cup bronze medal: 2024

Individual

- NWSL Best XI Second Team: 2026
