= Trinity Armstrong =

American soccer player (born 2007)

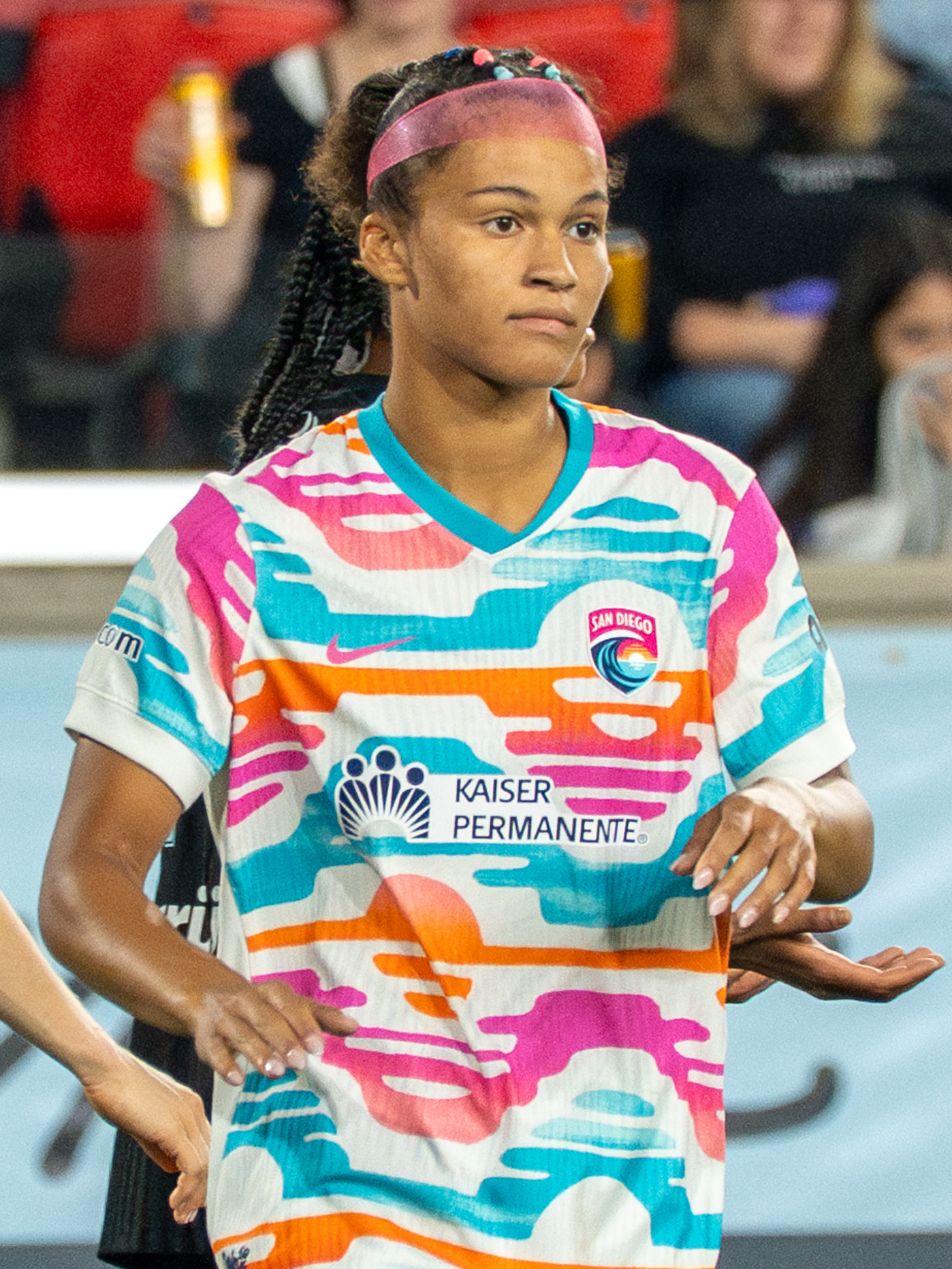
- Armstrong with the San Diego Wave in 2025

Personal information
- Full name: Trinity Zion Armstrong
- Date of birth: July 25, 2007 (age 19)
- Height: 5 ft 6 in (1.68 m)
- Position: Center back

Team information
- Current team: San Diego Wave
- Number: 3

Youth career
- 2020–2022: Solar SC
- 2022–2023: IMG Academy
- 2023–2024: FC Dallas

College career
Years	Team	Apps	(Gls)
2024	North Carolina Tar Heels	21	(1)

Senior career*
Years	Team	Apps	(Gls)
2025–	San Diego Wave	25	(1)

International career^{‡}
2023	United States U-16	1	(1)
2024	United States U-17	10	(0)
Medal record
Women's soccer
FIFA U-17 Women's World Cup
Bronze medal – third place	Dominican Republic 2024
- * Club domestic league appearances and goals as of 16:38, November 15, 2026 (UTC) ‡ National team caps and goals as of November 3, 2024

Trinity Zion Armstrong (born July 25, 2007) is an American professional soccer player who plays as a center back for San Diego Wave FC of the National Women's Soccer League (NWSL). She played college soccer for the North Carolina Tar Heels, winning the national championship and earning second-team All-American honors as a freshman in 2024. After one season at North Carolina, she began her professional career with the Wave in 2025. She won bronze with the United States at the 2024 FIFA U-17 Women's World Cup.

== Early life ==
Armstrong grew up in Frisco, Texas, north of Dallas, and began playing soccer at age three. She attended Hebron High School in Carrollton, Texas, for one year before transferring to IMG Academy in Bradenton, Florida. Before her junior year, she committed to play college soccer for North Carolina. The same summer, she was hospitalized with anemia and thought she might have to medically retire. She returned to the field back home with FC Dallas, earning ECNL All-American honors. She also trained with the NWSL's Racing Louisville as a preseason invitee. With several North Carolina commits leaving for the NWSL, she reclassified to graduate early and begin college at age 17.

== College career ==
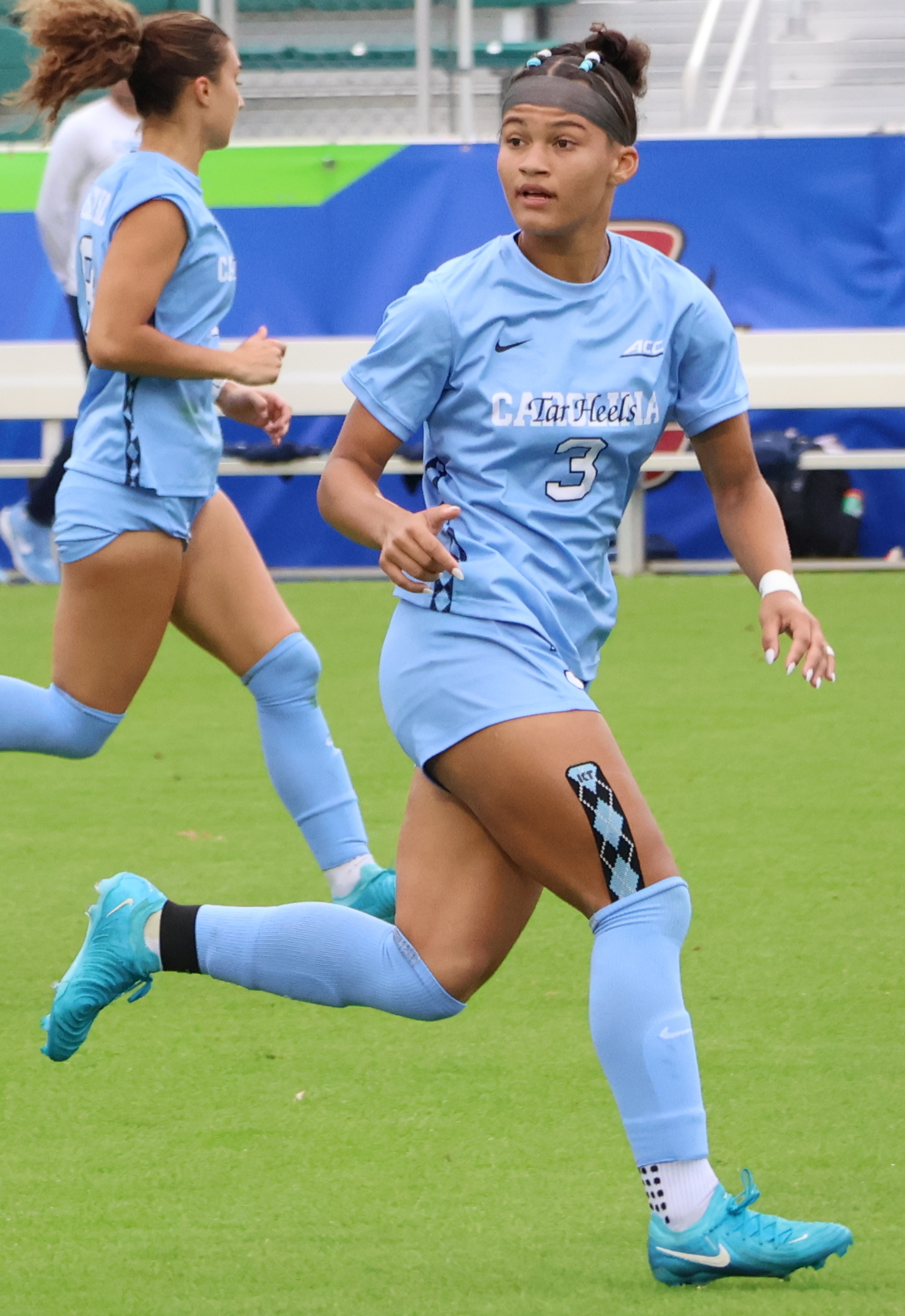
Armstrong playing for North Carolina in 2024

Armstrong played and started in 21 games and scored 1 goal for the North Carolina Tar Heels as a freshman in 2024. She contributed to a 19–2 record in games she played, while the team went 3–3 when she was away at the 2024 FIFA U-17 Women's World Cup. In the ACC tournament semifinals, she marked her return from the World Cup with a header goal and a crucial goal-line clearance in a 2–1 come-from-behind win over No. 1–ranked rivals Duke. In the NCAA tournament, she played every minute after the first round (when several starters were rested) and helped the team concede just one goal in six games. North Carolina won 1–0 against Wake Forest in the final to win their record 23rd national title and first since 2012. Armstrong garnered second-team All-American and first-team All-ACC recognition. TopDrawerSoccer said she "casually delivered one of the best defensive campaigns college soccer has seen from a freshman". After the season, she decided to forgo her remaining college eligibility and join the NWSL.

== Club career ==
San Diego Wave FC announced on January 16, 2025, that they had signed Armstrong to her first professional contract on a three-year deal. The 17-year-old was viewed as a potential successor to Naomi Girma, who left for Chelsea ten days later. Sports Illustrated ranked Armstrong as the top NWSL prospect in her rookie class. She made her professional debut with a stoppage-time appearance in the season-opening 1–1 draw with Angel City FC on March 16.

On April 12, Armstrong made her first professional start and won praise for helping shut down MVP Temwa Chawinga despite a 2–0 scoreline to the Kansas City Current. After starting again in a 4–1 win over Racing Louisville the following week, she became a regular starter in central defense under head coach Jonas Eidevall. In the next game, she joined teammates Kimmi Ascanio and Melanie Barcenas as the first 17-year-old trio to start an NWSL game, winning 3–0 against the Chicago Stars. On May 4, she scored her first professional goal with a late header in a 2–1 home win over Bay FC, becoming the youngest NWSL player to score a stoppage-time game-winning goal. She ended the month with a goal and an assist and became the youngest-ever selection to the NWSL Team of the Month.

Armstrong played in 23 regular-season games, starting 18, and scored 1 goal over 1,600 minutes as a rookie, contributing to a sixth-place finish for San Diego. In the playoff quarterfinals, she came on as an extra-time substitute and forced a point-blank save from Mackenzie Arnold, but it was not enough as the Wave lost 1–0 to the Portland Thorns. She also injured her left knee in the playoff game and missed the start of the next season.

On July 4, 2026, Armstrong returned from injury after the summer break as San Diego won 2–0 against Gotham FC. However, later that month, she tore the anterior cruciate ligament (ACL) and meniscus in her right knee, returning to the season-ending injury list.

== International career ==
Armstrong was called into camp with the United States under-15 team in 2022. She won the Montaigu Tournament with the under-16 team the following year. She started four of five games as the under-17 team won the 2024 CONCACAF Women's U-17 Championship. She tore her meniscus after the tournament but recovered in time for preseason with North Carolina. She played every minute of the 2024 FIFA U-17 Women's World Cup, helping keep four clean sheets in six matches as the United States finished in third place, its best result since 2008. She was nominated for U.S. Soccer Young Female Player of the Year alongside U-17 USWNT teammates Jordyn Bugg and Kennedy Fuller.

== Personal life ==
Armstrong is the daughter of Karla Nunn and has two older brothers. Her mother played college soccer for Kentucky. Armstrong is a Christian and places importance on the number three: "Trinity means three ... that's really big for my faith: Father, Son, Holy Spirit". Her nickname is "T3".

== Career statistics ==
=== Club ===
As of November 23, 2025

Appearances and goals by club, season and competition
Club	Season	League			Playoffs		Total	
Club	Season	Division	Apps	Goals	Apps	Goals	Apps	Goals
San Diego Wave FC	2025	NWSL	23	1	1	0	24	1
Career total			23	1	1	0	24	1

== Honors and awards ==
North Carolina Tar Heels

- NCAA Division I women's soccer tournament: 2024

United States U-17

- FIFA U-17 Women's World Cup bronze medal: 2024
- CONCACAF Women's U-17 Championship: 2024

Individual

- Second-team All-American: 2024
- First-team All-ACC: 2024
- NCAA tournament all-tournament team: 2024
- ACC tournament all-tournament team: 2024
