= Gia Corley =

German footballer (born 2002)

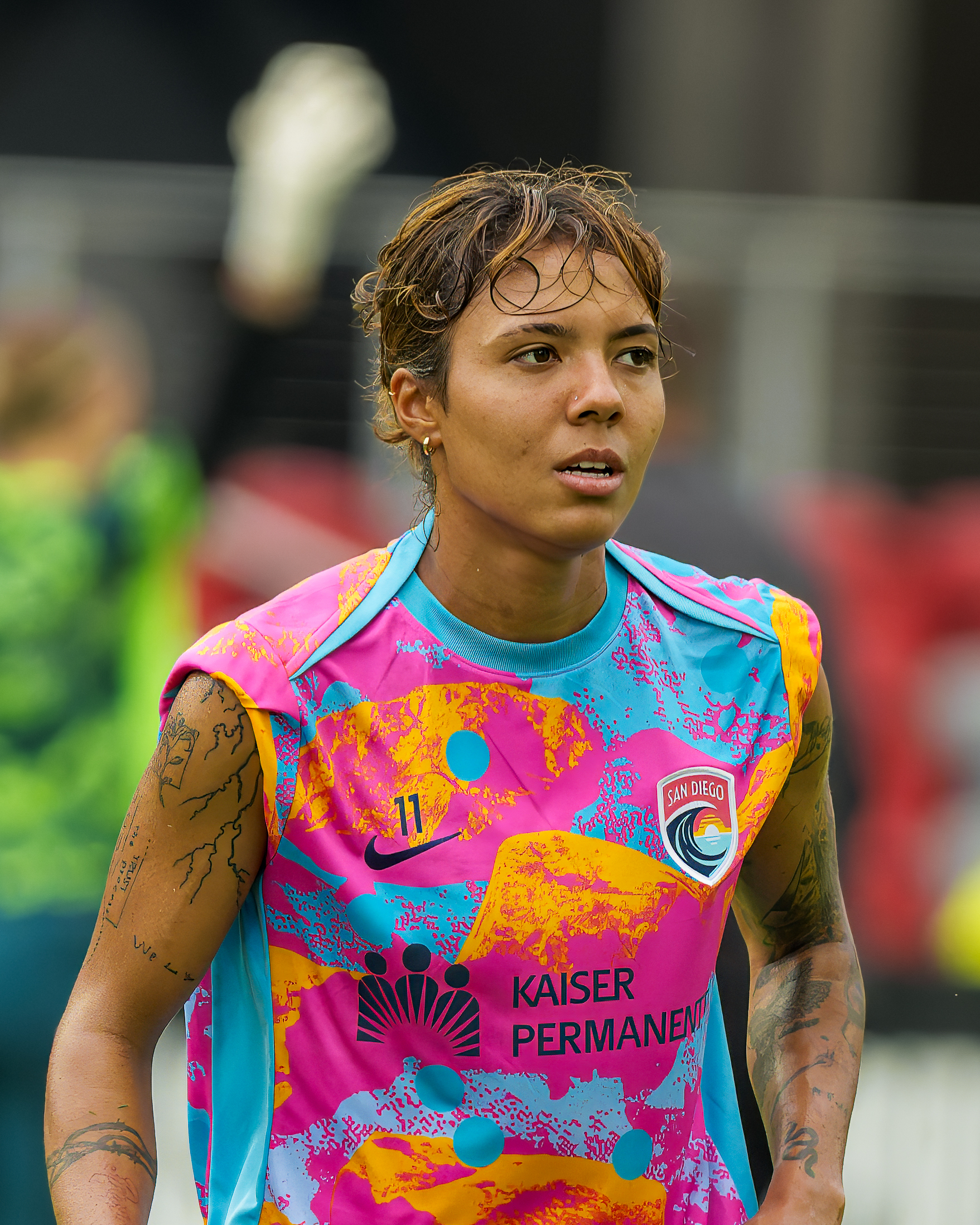
- Corley with the San Diego Wave in 2026

Personal information
- Full name: Gia Cymone Corley
- Date of birth: 20 May 2002 (age 24)
- Place of birth: Tacoma, Washington, United States
- Height: 1.60 m (5 ft 3 in)
- Position: Attacking midfielder

Team information
- Current team: San Diego Wave
- Number: 11

Senior career*
| Years | Team | Apps | (Gls) |
| 2018–2021 | Bayern Munich II | 38 | (15) |
| 2021 | Bayern Munich | 9 | (0) |
| 2021–2024 | TSG Hoffenheim | 64 | (12) |
| 2025– | San Diego Wave | 49 | (6) |

International career
| 2018–2019 | Germany U17 | 16 | (3) |
| 2020 | Germany U19 | 6 | (4) |
| 2022– | Germany U20 | 3 | (1) |
- * Club domestic league appearances and goals as of 16:40, November 15, 2026 (UTC)

Gia Cymone Corley (born 20 May 2002) is a professional footballer who plays as an attacking midfielder for San Diego Wave FC of the National Women's Soccer League (NWSL). She previously played for German clubs TSG Hoffenheim and Bayern Munich, winning Frauen-Bundesliga and 2. Frauen-Bundesliga titles with Bayern. She has represented Germany at multiple youth levels and captained the U-17 squad to a UEFA Women's Under-17 Championship victory in 2017.

== Early life ==
Corley was born in Tacoma, Washington, in the United States. She was introduced to football at an early age and often played with her younger brother. Her mother, Cornelia, is German, and her father is African-American. The family moved to Germany when Corley was a child.

== Club career ==
=== Bayern Munich ===
Corley spent part of her career playing for Bayern Munich's youth teams. She started with the U17 team in 2016 and 2017 before moving to the U20 squad in 2018. With the U20s, she won a 2. Frauen-Bundesliga title.

Corley was later promoted to the senior team in 2019, playing 9 league matches and also getting two appearances in the UEFA Women's Champions League. In Corley's first season with Bayern Munich's first team, the club won the Frauen-Bundesliga title.

=== TSG Hoffenheim ===
In 2022, Corley joined TSG Hoffenheim on a contract through 2023, expressing interest in taking on a new challenge. She scored her first goals with the club on 14 November 2021, registering a brace in a 7–1 victory over Bayern Leverkusen. Across four seasons at Hoffenheim, Corley made 64 appearances. She also scored 14 goals and recorded 12 assists across all competitions.

=== San Diego Wave ===
The NWSL's San Diego Wave FC announced on 15 January 2025, that they had signed Corley on a two-year contract, transferring from Hoffenheim for an undisclosed fee. She made her NWSL debut on 16 March 2025, scoring five minutes into a season-opening 1–1 draw against Angel City FC. In the following match, Corley scored another goal and recorded her first Wave assist in a 3–2 win over the Utah Royals. She became only the sixth player in NWSL history to score in her first two club appearances and was subsequently named the NWSL Player of the Week. At the conclusion of March, Corley was named to the NWSL Team of the Month for her efforts. On 25 May, Corley assisted Adriana Leon in a 5–2 win over the North Carolina Courage. Corley's assist, her first ever with San Diego, also helped the Wave set a club record for the most goals scored in a single match and extend their unbeaten streak to six games. She ended up making 24 regular season appearances in her first season with the Wave as San Diego finished in sixth place. She started and played all 90 minutes of regulation time of the Wave's quarterfinal defeat to the Portland Thorns on 9 November.

In January 2026, Corley agreed to re-sign with the Wave through 2027; her original contract had been set to expire at the end of 2026.

== International career ==
A youth international for Germany, Corley has represented the country at various levels. She started at U15 level and scored 2 goals in her first 6 international matches. In 2017, Corley captained the U17 team at the UEFA Women's Under-17 Championship, winning the tournament and receiving her first piece of international silverware. She is a two-time Fritz Walter Medal recipient, having won bronze in 2019 and silver in 2020.

Corley was called up to the United States under-23 team in October 2025 for a training camp held concurrently with the senior national team.

== Career statistics ==
=== Club ===
As of 15 November 2025

Appearances and goals by club, season and competition
| Club | Season | League | | | Cup (Note: Includes the DFB-Pokal Frauen) | | Playoffs | | Continental (Note: Includes the UEFA Women's Champions League) | | Total | |
| Club | Season | Division | Apps | Goals | Apps | Goals | Apps | Goals | Apps | Goals | Apps | Goals |
|---|---|---|---|---|---|---|---|---|---|---|---|---|
| Bayern Munich II | 2018–19 | 2. Frauen-Bundesliga | 18 | 6 | — | | — | | — | | 18 | 6 |
| Bayern Munich II | 2019–20 | 2. Frauen-Bundesliga | 14 | 3 | — | | — | | — | | 14 | 3 |
| Bayern Munich II | 2020–21 | 2. Frauen-Bundesliga | 6 | 6 | — | | — | | — | | 6 | 6 |
| Bayern Munich II | Total | | 38 | 15 | 0 | 0 | 0 | 0 | 0 | 0 | 38 | 15 |
| Bayern Munich | 2019–20 | Frauen-Bundesliga | 0 | 0 | 0 | 0 | — | | 1 | 0 | 1 | 0 |
| Bayern Munich | 2020–21 | Frauen-Bundesliga | 9 | 0 | 1 | 2 | — | | 4 | 0 | 14 | 2 |
| Bayern Munich | Total | | 9 | 0 | 1 | 2 | 0 | 0 | 5 | 0 | 15 | 2 |
| TSG Hoffenheim | 2021–22 | Frauen-Bundesliga | 14 | 3 | 2 | 0 | — | | 10 | 1 | 26 | 4 |
| TSG Hoffenheim | 2022–23 | Frauen-Bundesliga | 21 | 5 | 3 | 1 | — | | — | | 24 | 6 |
| TSG Hoffenheim | 2023–24 | Frauen-Bundesliga | 20 | 2 | 3 | 1 | — | | — | | 23 | 3 |
| TSG Hoffenheim | 2024–25 | Frauen-Bundesliga | 9 | 2 | 1 | 0 | — | | — | | 10 | 2 |
| TSG Hoffenheim | Total | | 64 | 12 | 9 | 2 | 0 | 0 | 10 | 1 | 83 | 15 |
| San Diego Wave FC | 2025 | NWSL | 24 | 2 | — | | 1 | 0 | — | | 25 | 2 |
| Career total | | | 135 | 29 | 10 | 4 | 1 | 0 | 15 | 1 | 161 | 34 |
