= San Diego Wave FC =

National Women's Soccer League team in San Diego, California

- Full name: San Diego Wave Fútbol Club
- Founded: June 8, 2021; 5 years ago
- Stadium: Snapdragon Stadium; San Diego, California
- Capacity: 35,000
- Owners: Levine Leichtman family office Lauren Leichtman and Arthur Levine (majority owners); Alex Morgan and Jimmy Butler (minority investors)
- Head coach: Jonas Eidevall
- League: National Women's Soccer League
- 2026: Regular season: 2nd of 16; Playoffs: Quarter-finals
- Website: sandiegowavefc.com
Home colors	Away colors

San Diego Wave Fútbol Club is an American professional soccer team based in San Diego that competes in the National Women's Soccer League (NWSL). The team plays its home games at Snapdragon Stadium. Founded on June 8, 2021, the Wave began play in the 2022 season as an expansion team. The Wave won the NWSL Shield with the league's best record in the 2023 season, the club's first trophy. The club won the NWSL Challenge Cup in its 2024 edition.

== History ==
The team is San Diego's first women's professional soccer team since 2003, when the Women's United Soccer Association folded and forced the San Diego Spirit to disband.

In January 2021, Lisa Baird, the commissioner of the National Women's Soccer League (NWSL), announced that an expansion team in Sacramento, led by Ron Burkle and in conjunction with Sacramento Republic FC's expansion bid into Major League Soccer, would join the NWSL in 2022. However, Burkle never confirmed the news publicly before exiting the Sacramento Republic's ownership group. Instead, on June 8, 2021, the NWSL announced San Diego as the location for an expansion team owned by Burkle to begin play in 2022. On November 9, it was announced the team would be called Wave Fútbol Club.

=== 2022: Inaugural season ===
San Diego Wave FC officially began play on March 19, 2022, in the NWSL Challenge Cup against fellow expansion team Angel City FC on the road, where they drew 1-1. They were eliminated from the Challenge Cup after finishing third in their group. The team began their inaugural season on May 1 and opened with three straight wins, sitting on the top of the table for over half the season before finally falling to the KC Current 2–1. Although briefly gaining the top spot twice late in the season, the Wave finished 3rd and qualified for the quarter-finals of the playoffs. After defeating the Chicago Red Stars 2–1, the team traveled to Providence Park to play against the Portland Thorns in the semi-finals, losing 2-1 following a Crystal Dunn goal in the final minutes of the game. Wave members were heavily represented in the end-of-season awards, with Alex Morgan winning the Golden Boot, Kailen Sheridan winning Goalkeeper of the Year, Casey Stoney named as Coach of the Year, Naomi Girma being crowned as both the Defender of the Year and Rookie of the Year.

=== 2023 ===
In the 2023 season, the Wave continued their winning ways, slightly improving upon their record in 2022 and securing the NWSL Shield with two games to spare after beating the Portland Thorns on September 30 and guaranteeing a bye for the playoffs. The Wave faced OL Reign in the semi-finals, losing 1–0 after Veronica Latsko scored in the 47th minute, marking the second year in a row the Wave were eliminated in the semis. Defender Naomi Girma was named U.S. Soccer's Female Player of the Year, recognizing her excellence for the Wave and for the U.S. women's national team.

=== 2024 ===
The Wave kicked off 2024 by winning the Challenge Cup 1–0 over 2023 champion NJ/NY Gotham FC with an 88th-minute goal from Alex Morgan. However, during the season, the Wave failed to replicate their successes from prior years. The team finished 10th in the regular season standings and did not qualify for the playoffs for the first time in club history. The Wave also competed in the NWSL x Liga MX Femenil Summer Cup and the CONCACAF W Champions Cup, but they failed to make it out of the group stage in both competitions. Amid a 7-game winless streak, the club fired head coach Casey Stoney, who had been part of the Wave since 2022. Stoney was replaced by interim coach Paul Buckle, who led the team through the summer of 2024. After Buckle's departure, Landon Donovan managed the team to the end of the season.

2024 also featured notable off-the-field events in the Wave's history. On March 14, owner Ron Burkle announced the sale of San Diego Wave FC to Lauren Leichtman and Arthur Levine, managers of the Levine Leichtman Capital Partners investment firm, for $113 million and a total (and, at the time, league record) team valuation of $120 million. The new owners immediately paid $35 million for 35% of the team, and paid $78 million for the remaining 65% of the team at the end of the 2024 NWSL season. This represents a large increase in team value from the $2 million Burkle paid just two years previously as an NWSL expansion fee. The Wave also hired Camille Ashton as sporting manager and general manager to replace Molly Downtain, who left in the offseason. Finally, the club hired former USWNT player Shannon MacMillan as Chief Impact Officer on July 1, 2024.

In July, several former Wave employees spoke out on social media, alleging that the club and president Jill Ellis created an unhealthy and abusive work environment. The Wave denied all allegations and threatened legal action against those who spoke out. In mid-October, five former employees filed a lawsuit against the Wave and the NWSL, alleging discrimination, sexual harassment, wrongful termination, and retaliation. In December, the Wave announced Jill Ellis's immediate departure to become Chief of Football at FIFA.

=== 2025 ===
Leading up to the 2025 season, the Wave announced that interim coach Landon Donovan would not be returning to his position. On January 7, 2025, Swedish manager Jonas Eidevall was announced to be filling the role, becoming the Wave's second-ever full-time head coach in club history.

== Ownership ==
San Diego Wave FC are owned by the Levine Leichtman family office, led by majority owners Lauren Leichtman and Arthur Levine (founders of Levine Leichtman Capital Partners).

In May 2025, two-time FIFA Women’s World Cup champion Alex Morgan joined the Wave’s ownership group as a minority investor.

In October 2025, NBA All-Star and Olympic gold medalist Jimmy Butler also became a minority investor in the club.

== Colors and crest ==
Wordmark also used as part of San Diego Wave FC's identity.

On December 15, 2021, the team revealed its crest for its upcoming 2022 season in a press release, stating "the crest, encased in a shield, is a symbol of strength, for the city and team, to proudly stand behind. A powerful wave, cresting in the rich blues of the Pacific Ocean, sits front and center as the iconic mark of the Wave. And under the proud banner of the city’s name, are the vivid colors of the horizon, celebrating the beauty, fun, and vibrant culture of the city and its people".

=== Sponsorship ===
Period	Kit manufacturer	Front sponsor	Back sponsor	Sleeve sponsor
2022	Nike	Kaiser Permanente	Pechanga Resort Casino	Gatorade
2023	Nike	Kaiser Permanente	Think Blue San Diego; Will Perform	Bud Light
2024	Nike	Kaiser Permanente	PenFed Credit Union; 24 Hour Fitness	Dexcom

=== Kit history ===
2022 home	2022–23 away	2023 home	2024–25 home	2024 away	2025– away	2026– home

== Stadium ==
The club began play at Torero Stadium on the campus of the University of San Diego for its inaugural season. It moved to Snapdragon Stadium, located in the Mission Valley campus expansion of San Diego State University (SDSU), for its last two home games of the 2022 season. The Wave's opener at the new stadium against regional rival and fellow 2022 NWSL entry Angel City FC on September 17 drew a sellout crowd of 32,000, setting a new NWSL single-game attendance record. On March 23, 2024, the Wave set the current record for NWSL season home opener attendance with 32,066 fans attending their 2–1 loss to the Kansas City Current. In October 2026, the Wave stated that they were looking into building a new 12,000 to 16,000 seat stadium at the Del Mar Fairgrounds due to the team being unsatisfied with scheduling constraints at Snapdragon Stadium.

== Players and staff ==
=== Current squad ===
As of September 11, 2026.

No.	Pos.	Nation	Player
1	GK	COL	Luisa Agudelo
2	DF	USA	Kennedy Wesley
3	DF	USA	Trinity Armstrong
4	MF	ENG	Laila Harbert
6	DF	CAN	Brooklyn Courtnall (on loan from Bay FC)
7	FW	USA	Melanie Barcenas
8	MF	USA	Kimmi Ascanio
9	FW	CAN	Adriana Leon
10	MF	FRA	Kenza Dali
11	MF	GER	Gia Corley
12	GK	ESP	Sandra Paños
14	DF	USA	Kristen McNabb
15	FW	USA	Trinity Byars
16	DF	JAM	Mimi Van Zanten
17	FW	BRA	Ludmila
18	MF	FRA	Laurina Fazer
19	MF	USA	Tatum Wynalda
20	FW	USA	Catarina Macario
21	FW	ITA	Barbara Bonansea (on loan from Juventus)
22	MF	USA	Lia Godfrey
23	DF	PHI	Nya Harrison
31	GK	BIH	DiDi Haračić
33	MF	USA	Kiki Pickett
75	DF	FRA	Perle Morroni
81	FW	BRA	Gabi Portilho
88	FW	BRA	Dudinha

==== Out on loan ====
No.	Pos.	Nation	Player
28	MF	USA	Jordan Fusco (on loan to Racing Louisville through December 31, 2026)

=== Former players ===
For details of former players, see Category:San Diego Wave FC players and List of San Diego Wave FC players.

=== Staff ===
As of October 9, 2025.

Coaching
Head coach	Jonas Eidevall
Assistant Coach	Becki Tweed
Head of Goalkeeping	Kenneth Mattsson
Individual Performance Coach	Anja Mittag
Technical
General Manager	Camille Ashton
Technical Director	Chris Loxston

== Records ==
=== Year-by-year ===
As of December 8, 2024

Season	Regular season								Playoffs	Challenge Cup	Summer Cup	Champions Cup	Top Scorer	Avg. attendance
Season	P	W	D	L	GF	GA	Pts	Pos	Playoffs	Challenge Cup	Summer Cup	Champions Cup	Top Scorer	Avg. attendance
2022	22	10	6	6	32	21	36	3rd	Semi-finals	Group stage	Not held	Not held	(United States) Alex Morgan (12)	8,729
2023	22	11	4	7	31	22	37	1st	Semi-finals	Group stage	Not held	Not held	(United States) Alex Morgan (6)	20,718
2024	26	6	7	13	25	35	25	10th	DNQ	**Champions**	Group stage	Group stage	(United States) Jaedyn Shaw (4)	19,575
2025	26	10	9	7	32	29	39	6th	Quarter-finals	DNQ	N/A	DNQ	TBD	TBD

=== Head coaching record ===
As of January 21, 2026

Only competitive matches are counted. Includes NWSL regular season, playoffs, and Challenge Cup matches.

All-time San Diego Wave FC coaching stats
Name	Nationality	From	To	W	D	L	GF	GA	GD	Win%
Casey Stoney	England	July 14, 2021	June 24, 2024	65	32	28	94	82	+12	52
Paul Buckle (interim)	England	June 24, 2024	August 15, 2024	0	0	2	0	4	-4	0
Landon Donovan (interim)	United States	August 16, 2024	November 18, 2024	3	1	6	12	18	-6	30
Jonas Eidevall	Sweden	January 7, 2025	present	10	7	10	41	34	+7	37

=== Team records ===
As of November 9, 2025. Current players in bold. Statistics are updated once a year after the conclusion of the NWSL season.

Most appearances
Player					Appearances					
#	Name	Nat.	Pos.	Wave career	NWSL	Playoffs	Cup	Cont'l	Other	Total
1	**Kristen McNabb**	(United States)	DF	2022–	82	4	6	4	3	**99**
2	Kailen Sheridan	(United States)	FW	2022-2025	82	4	6	4	3	87
3	Makenzy Mobbe	(United States)	GK	2022–2025	86	4	4	3	0	82
4	Christen Westphal	(United States)	DF	2022–2024	59	3	12	3	3	**80**
5	Naomi Girma	(United States)	DF	2022–2024	58	3	9	2	0	**72**
6	Emily van Egmond	(Australia)	MF	2022–2024	58	3	5	4	0	**70**
7	Amirah Ali	(United States)	FW	2022–2024	48	3	11	3	3	**68**
8	Alex Morgan	(United States)	FW	2022–2024	48	3	8	1	3	**63**
9	Sofia Jakobsson	(Sweden)	FW	2022–2024	45	3	9	1	1	**59**
9	Jaedyn Shaw	(United States)	FW	2022–2024	47	3	7	2	0	**59**

Top goalscorers
Player					Goals scored					
#	Name	Nat.	Pos.	Wave career	NWSL	Playoffs	Cup	Cont'l	Other	Total
1	Alex Morgan	(United States)	FW	2022–2024	19	1	5	0	0	25
2	Jaedyn Shaw	(United States)	FW	2022–2024	13	0	1	0	0	14
3	**Makenzy Robbe**	(United States)	FW	2022–	10	0	0	0	0	10
4	María Sánchez	(Mexico)	FW	2024–2025	4	0	0	4	1	9
5	Amirah Ali	(United States)	FW	2022–2024	5	0	1	1	1	8
6	**Delphine Cascarino**	(France)	FW	2024–	7	0	0	0	0	7
6	Taylor Kornieck	(United States)	MF	2022–2023	4	1	2	0	0	7
6	**Kristen McNabb**	(United States)	DF	2022–	6	0	0	1	0	7
9	**Kenza Dali**	(France)	MF	2025–	5	0	0	0	0	5
9	**Dudinha**	(Brazil)	FW	2025–	5	0	0	0	0	5

Most assists
Player					Assists					
#	Name	Nat.	Pos.	Wave career	NWSL	Playoffs	Cup	Cont'l	Other	Total
1	**Delphine Cascarino**	(France)	FW	2024–	9	0	0	1	0	10
1	Alex Morgan	(United States)	FW	2022–2024	8	1	1	0	0	10
3	María Sánchez	(Mexico)	FW	2024–2025	6	0	0	0	1	7
3	Christen Westphal	(United States)	DF	2022–2024	6	0	1	0	0	7
5	Sofia Jakobsson	(Sweden)	FW	2022–2024	4	1	0	0	0	5
5	**Hanna Lundkvist**	(Sweden)	DF	2024–	3	0	0	2	0	5
5	**Makenzy Robbe**	(United States)	FW	2022–	5	0	0	0	0	5
5	Jaedyn Shaw	(United States)	FW	2022–2024	4	0	1	0	0	5
9	Taylor Kornieck	(United States)	MF	2022–2023	3	0	1	0	0	4
9	**Perle Morroni**	(France)	DF	2024–	4	0	0	0	0	4
9	Kelsey Turnbow	(United States)	MF	2022–2023	3	0	1	0	0	4

== Honors ==
- NWSL Shield
  - Winners (1): 2023
- NWSL Challenge Cup
  - Winners (1): 2024
- World Sevens Football
  - Winners (1): 2025

== Award winners ==
=== Golden Boot ===
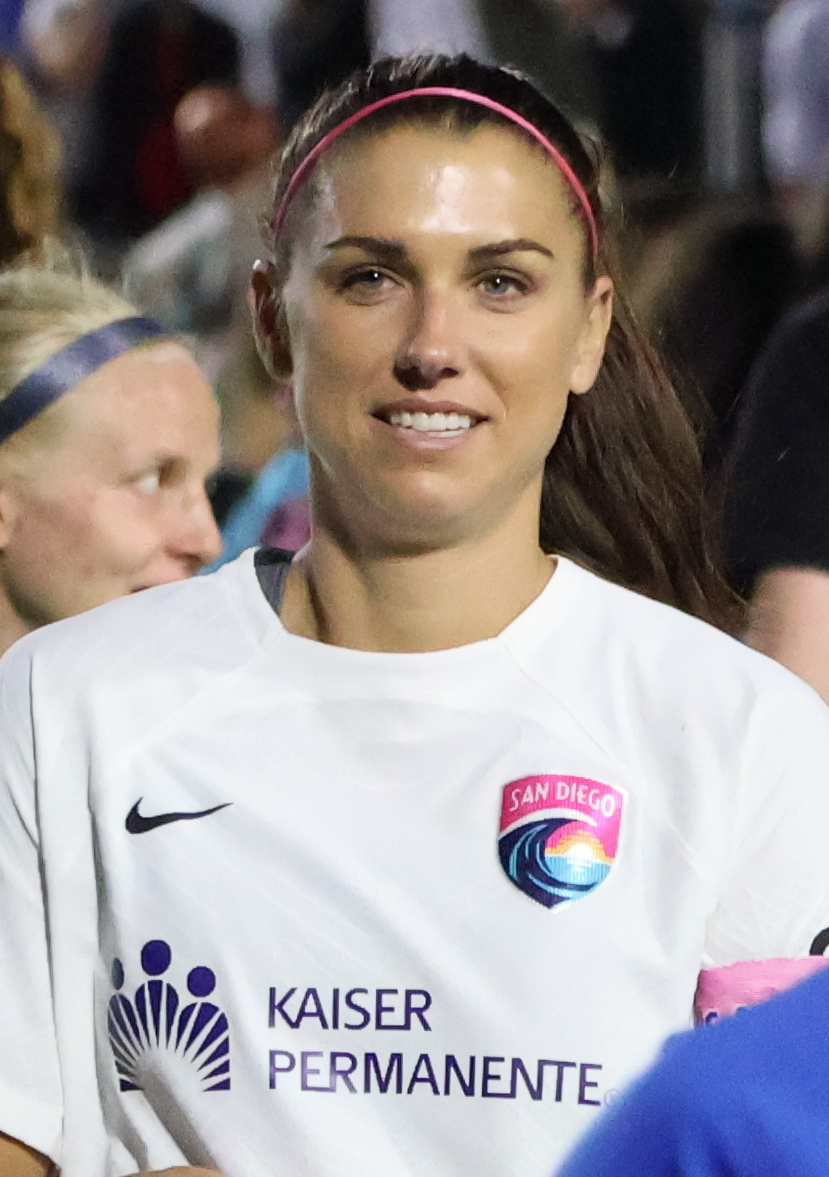
- San Diego Wave's 2022 Golden Boot winner, Alex Morgan.
  Alex Morgan: 2022

=== Defender of the Year ===
- Naomi Girma: 2022, 2023

=== Goalkeeper of the Year ===
- Kailen Sheridan: 2022

=== Rookie of the Year ===
- Naomi Girma: 2022

=== Coach of the Year ===
- Casey Stoney: 2022

=== Best XI First Team ===
- Jaedyn Shaw: 2023
- Naomi Girma: 2022, 2023
- Alex Morgan: 2022
- Kailen Sheridan: 2022

=== Best XI Second Team ===
- Naomi Girma: 2024
- Alex Morgan: 2023
- Kailen Sheridan: 2023
