= Melanie Barcenas =

American soccer player (born 2007)

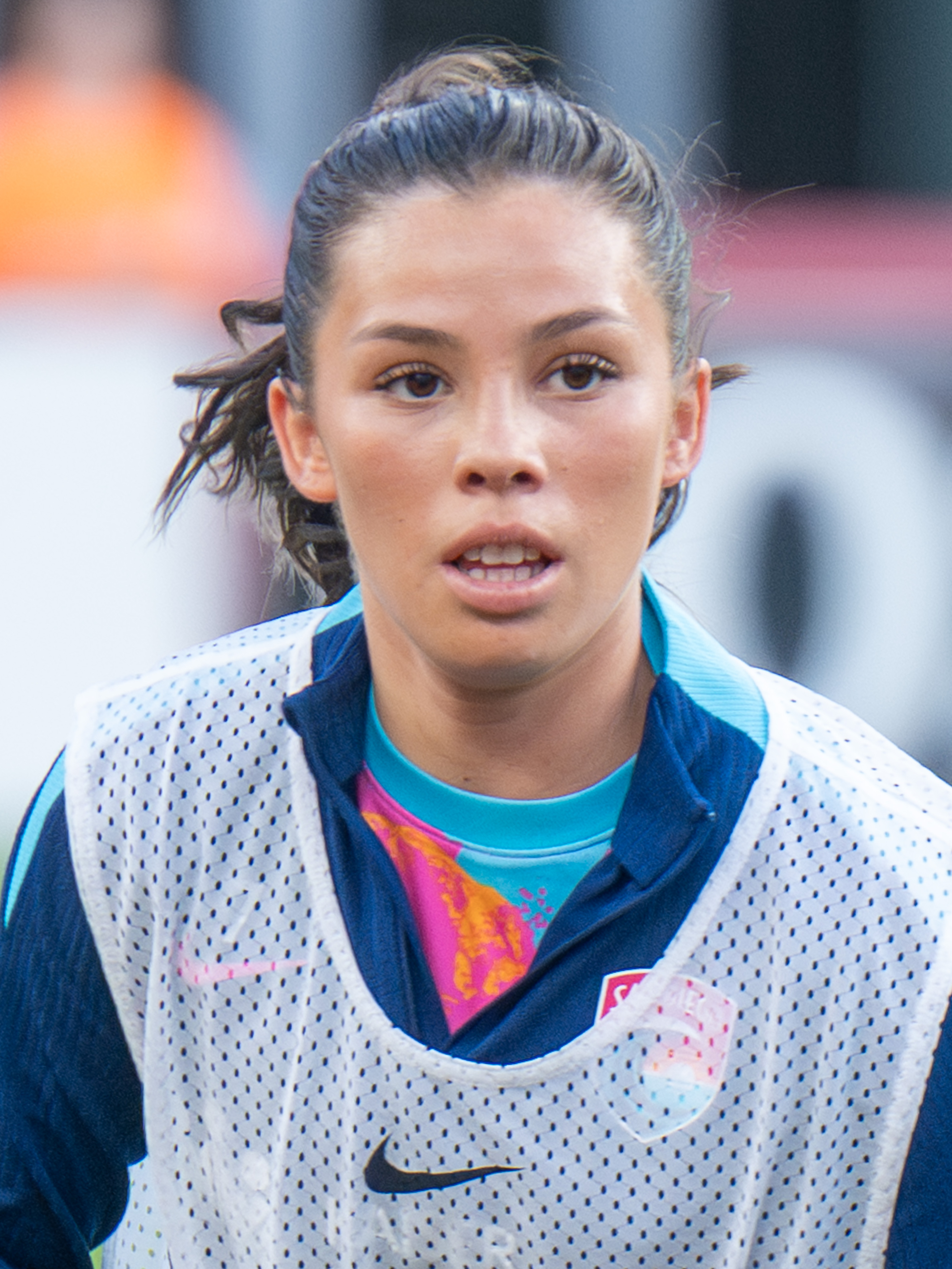
- Barcenas with the San Diego Wave in 2026

Personal information
- Full name: Melanie Magali Barcenas
- Date of birth: October 30, 2007 (age 19)
- Place of birth: San Diego, California, U.S.
- Height: 5 ft 4 in (1.63 m)
- Position: Forward

Team information
- Current team: San Diego Wave
- Number: 7

Youth career
- 2013–2023: San Diego Surf

Senior career*
Years	Team	Apps	(Gls)
2023–	San Diego Wave	63	(9)

International career^{‡}
2022–2024	United States U17	16	(5)
2026–	United States U19	2	(0)
Medal record
Women's soccer
FIFA U-17 Women's World Cup
Bronze medal – third place	Dominican Republic 2024
- * Club domestic league appearances and goals as of 16:39, November 15, 2026 (UTC) ‡ National team caps and goals as of November 3, 2024

Melanie Magali Barcenas (born October 30, 2007) is an American professional soccer player who plays as a forward for San Diego Wave FC of the National Women's Soccer League (NWSL). She was the youngest player in the NWSL when she signed with the Wave at age 15 in 2023. She won bronze with the United States at the 2024 FIFA U-17 Women's World Cup.

== Early life ==
Barcenas was born and raised in San Diego, California. At age 10, she accompanied United States players out onto the pitch before a match against Brazil at Qualcomm Stadium in San Diego; after the match, she asked for and received a jersey from her favorite player and future Wave teammate Alex Morgan.

Barcenas played during her youth career with San Diego Surf. She was part of the Surf under-8 team that won the 2014 Albion Cup National Soccer Showcase in San Diego and the leading goalscorer for the Surf's under-12 team at the 2019 Far West President's Cup in Norco, California, which the Surf won on two goals by Barcenas in the championship match.

== Club career ==
San Diego Wave FC announced on March 21, 2023, that the club had signed Barcenas to a three-year contract under the recently created NWSL Under-18 Entry Mechanism. At the age of 15 years and 138 days, she became the youngest player at the time to sign in the NWSL, breaking the record set by Chloe Ricketts earlier in the month (15 years and 283 days). She had made her first appearance during a preseason match against Angel City FC earlier in the week.

On April 29, 2023, Barcenas made her NWSL regular-season debut as a 72nd-minute substitute for Belle Briede in a 3–1 loss to the Orlando Pride, becoming the youngest NWSL player to appear in a regular-season match (15 years and 177 days). On August 19, she became the youngest player to record an NWSL assist after setting up Amirah Ali in a 2–1 win over NJ/NY Gotham FC. She made 12 appearances in all competitions as the Wave won the NWSL Shield with the best record in the league.

On September 28, 2024, Barcenas scored her first professional goal in a 2–0 victory over the Portland Thorns. She made 16 appearances in all competitions in her second season, but the Wave finished 10th and missed the playoffs for the first time.

Under new head coach Jonas Eidevall, Barcenas scored her first goal of the season in a 4–1 win over Racing Louisville on April 19, 2025. The following week, she joined teammates Trinity Armstrong and Kimmi Ascanio as the first trio of 17-year-olds to start an NWSL game. She appeared in 17 matches over her third season as San Diego finished in sixth, though she missed the playoffs through injury as the Wave lost to the Portland Thorns in the quarterfinals.

With her rookie contract expiring, Barcenas signed a new one-year deal with the Wave on December 31, 2025. She scored her first goal of the season on March 25, 2026, in a 3–1 win over the Portland Thorns. Three days later, she scored an NWSL Goal of the Week–winning strike from the top of the box against the Chicago Stars. On July 4, she scored another Goal of the Week from distance into the top bins in a 2–0 win over Gotham FC. Later that month, she became the second-youngest NWSL player to make 50 regular-season appearances after Olivia Moultrie.

== International career ==
Barcenas has Mexican American heritage. On January 17, 2022, Barcenas attended training camp for the Mexico national under-17 team.

On April 11, 2022, Barcenas was the youngest player named to the initial roster of the United States national under-17 team for the 2022 CONCACAF Women's U-17 Championship, but was forced to withdraw before the start of the tournament due to an ankle injury. She was called into United States under-17 friendlies in August 2022 and under-16 training camp in October 2022.

In February 2023, Barcenas played in two exhibition games with the United States under-17 team. Barcenas was named to the roster for the 2024 CONCACAF Women's U-17 Championship in Mexico where she scored 1 goal en route to the US team winning the championship for the sixth time as well as qualifying the team for the 2024 FIFA U-17 Women's World Cup.

Barcenas started every game for the United States as they placed third at the 2024 FIFA U-17 Women's World Cup, their best result since 2008. She scored three times in the group stage, with one goal in a 3–1 loss to Spain and two goals in a 5–0 win over South Korea.

The Wave's club website notes that Barcenas has also represented the United States at the under-14 and under-15 levels.

== Career statistics ==
=== Club ===
As of November 23, 2025

Appearances and goals by club, season and competition
Club	Season	League			Cup (Note: Includes the NWSL Challenge Cup)		Playoffs (Note: Includes NWSL playoffs)		Continental (Note: Includes CONCACAF W Champions Cup)		Other		Total	
Club	Season	Division	Apps	Goals	Apps	Goals	Apps	Goals	Apps	Goals	Apps	Goals	Apps	Goals
San Diego Wave FC	2023	NWSL	7	0	5	0	0	0	—		—		12	0
San Diego Wave FC	2024	NWSL	10	1	0	0	—		3	0	3 (Note: Includes NWSL x Liga MX Femenil Summer Cup)	0	16	1
San Diego Wave FC	2025	NWSL	17	1	—		0	0	—		—		17	1
Career total			34	2	5	0	0	0	3	0	3	0	45	2

== Honors ==
San Diego Wave

- NWSL Shield: 2023
- NWSL Challenge Cup: 2024

United States U-17

- CONCACAF Women's U-17 Championship: 2024
- FIFA U-17 Women's World Cup Bronze Medal: 2024
