= 2022 OL Reign season =

OL Reign
2022 season
- Majority owner: OL Groupe
- CEO: Vincent Berthillot
- Head coach: Laura Harvey
- Stadium: Lumen Field
- NWSL: 1st of 12
- Playoffs: Semifinal
- Challenge Cup: Semifinal
- Top goalscorer: League: Bethany Balcer, Megan Rapinoe (7); All: Bethany Balcer (9)
Home colors	Away colors

The 2022 OL Reign season was the team's tenth season of play and their tenth season in the National Women's Soccer League, the top division of women's soccer in the United States.

In December 2021, the team announced that it would start playing its home games at Lumen Field in Seattle, Washington.

== Team ==
=== Technical staff ===
As of February 3, 2022.

Position	Name
Head coach	Laura Harvey
Assistant coach	Sam Laity
Goalkeeper coach	Ljupčo Kmetovski
Video analyst	Eric Rossitch

=== Roster ===
As of September 19, 2022.

No.	Nat.	Name	Date of birth (age)	Since	Previous team	Notes (Note: denotes a season-ending injury.)
Goalkeepers
18	(United States)	Laurel Ivory	August 28, 1999 (aged 22)	2022	(United States) Virginia Cavaliers	
30	(United States)	Claudia Dickey	January 6, 2000 (aged 22)	2022	(United States) North Carolina Tar Heels	
91	(United States)	Phallon Tullis-Joyce	October 19, 1996 (aged 25)	2021	(France) Stade de Reims	
Defenders
3	(United States)	Lauren Barnes (co-captain)	May 31, 1989 (aged 32)	2013	(United States) Philadelphia Independence	
4	(United States)	Alana Cook	April 11, 1997 (aged 24)	2021	(France) Paris Saint-Germain	
11	(United States)	Sofia Huerta	December 14, 1992 (aged 29)	2020	(Australia) Sydney FC	
14	(Mexico)	Jimena López	January 30, 1999 (aged 23)	2021	(Spain) SD Eibar	INT
17	(United States)	Sam Hiatt	January 6, 1998 (aged 24)	2020	(United States) Stanford Cardinal	
19	(United States)	Sinclaire Miramontez	April 11, 1998 (aged 23)	2022	(United States) Racing Louisville	
20	(United States)	Alyssa Malonson	April 9, 1999 (aged 22)	2022	(United States) Auburn Tigers	LOA
21	(United States)	Phoebe McClernon	December 13, 1997 (aged 24)	2022	(United States) Orlando Pride	
22	(United States)	Ryanne Brown	January 21, 1999 (aged 23)	2022	(United States) Wake Forest Demon Deacons	LOA
Midfielders
2	(United States)	Nikki Stanton	October 26, 1990 (aged 31)	2022	(United States) Chicago Red Stars	
5	(Canada)	Quinn	August 11, 1995 (aged 26)	2019	(France) Paris FC	
6	(Brazil)	Angelina	January 26, 2000 (aged 22)	2021	(Brazil) Palmeiras	
10	(Wales)	Jess Fishlock	January 14, 1987 (aged 35)	2013	(England) Bristol Academy	
12	(United States)	Olivia Athens	August 1, 1998 (aged 23)	2022	(United States) UCLA Bruins	
13	(United States)	Marley Canales	November 16, 1997 (aged 24)	2022	(United States) UCLA Bruins	
16	(United States)	Rose Lavelle	May 14, 1995 (aged 26)	2021	(England) Manchester City	
33	(United States)	Olivia Van der Jagt	July 21, 1999 (aged 22)	2022	(United States) Washington Huskies	
Forwards
8	(United States)	Bethany Balcer	March 7, 1997 (aged 25)	2019	(United States) Spring Arbor Cougars	
9	(Canada)	Jordyn Huitema	May 8, 2001 (aged 20)	2022	(France) Paris Saint-Germain	INT
15	(United States)	Megan Rapinoe (co-captain)	July 5, 1985 (aged 36)	2013	(France) Lyon	
23	(United States)	Tziarra King	August 24, 1998 (aged 23)	2021	(United States) Utah Royals	
24	(United States)	Veronica Latsko	December 12, 1995 (aged 26)	2022	(United States) Houston Dash	
44	(United States)	Jodi Ülkekul	July 23, 1997 (aged 24)	2022	(Spain) CD Castellón	
77	(United States)	Tobin Heath	May 29, 1988 (aged 33)	2022	(England) Arsenal	

== Competitions ==
Win Tie Loss

All times are in PT unless otherwise noted.

=== Preseason and friendlies ===
==== Thorns Preseason Tournament ====
March 5, 2022	Portland Thorns FC	0–0	OL Reign	Portland, Oregon
17:00	Betfort (yellow card) 70'	Report	Hiatt (yellow card) 65'; Hammond (yellow card) 90+2'	Stadium: Providence Park; Attendance: 8,452

March 8, 2022	OL Reign	2–1	Chicago Red Stars	Portland, Oregon
17:00	Stanton 34'; King 36'		Cook 35' (yellow card) 47'	Stadium: Providence Park

March 11, 2022	OL Reign	1–1	United States U-23	Portland, Oregon
17:00	Fishlock 66'	Report	Bethune 38'	Stadium: Providence Park

==== The Women's Cup ====
August 17, 2022 Semifinal	OL Reign (United States)	2–1	(Mexico) Club América	Louisville, Kentucky
2:00 p.m.	King 79'; Van der Jagt 82'	Report	Palacios 60'	Stadium: Lynn Family Stadium

August 20, 2022 Final	Racing Louisville FC (United States)	1–2	(United States) OL Reign	Louisville, Kentucky
4:00 p.m.	Davis 34'	Report	Athens 59'; Huitema 66'	Stadium: Lynn Family Stadium

=== Regular season ===
May 1, 2022 1	Washington Spirit	2–1	OL Reign	Washington, D.C.
14:00	Sanchez 14'; Hatch 66'; Kingsbury (yellow card) 90+2'	Box; Report	Lavelle 53'; Stanton (yellow card) 72'; Cook (yellow card) 74'; López (yellow card) 86'	Stadium: Audi Field; Attendance: 10,177; Referee: Alex Billeter

May 8, 2022 2	OL Reign	2–2	Racing Louisville FC	Seattle, Washington
15:00	King 33', 37'; Balcer (yellow card) 64'; Angelina (yellow card) 70'	Box; Report	McDonald 23'; Balcer 60' (o.g.); Lund (yellow card) 65'	Stadium: Lumen Field; Attendance: 4,396; Referee: Karen Callado

May 13, 2022 3	Portland Thorns FC	0–0	OL Reign	Portland, Oregon
19:30		Box; Report		Stadium: Providence Park; Attendance: 14,496; Referee: Elvis Osmanovic

May 22, 2022 4	OL Reign	0–0	Washington Spirit	Seattle, Washington
15:00	Van der Jagt (yellow card) 74'	Box; Report	Rodman (yellow card) 71'	Stadium: Lumen Field; Attendance: 5,846; Referee: Samantha Martinez

May 25, 2022 5	OL Reign	1–0	Kansas City Current	Seattle, Washington
19:00	McClernon (yellow card) 6'; Angelina (yellow card) 62'; Balcer 80'	Box; Report	Nolf (yellow card) 27'	Stadium: Lumen Field; Attendance: 3,944; Referee: Adorae Monroy

May 29, 2022 6	OL Reign	1–0	San Diego Wave FC	Seattle, Washington
12:00	Hiatt (yellow card) 24'; Lavelle 75'	Box; Report	McGrady (yellow card) 71'	Stadium: Lumen Field; Attendance: 5,712; Referee: Brandon Stevis

June 4, 2022 7	Chicago Red Stars	1–0	OL Reign	Bridgeview, Illinois
12:00	Aguilera (yellow card) 18'; Pugh 47'; Hill (yellow card) 90+2'	Box; Report		Stadium: SeatGeek Stadium; Attendance: 3,002; Referee: Alex Billeter

June 12, 2022 8	San Diego Wave FC	1–1	OL Reign	San Diego, California
14:00	Morgan 8'	Box; Report	Fishlock 38'	Stadium: Torero Stadium; Attendance: 5,000; Referee: Calin Radosav

June 18, 2022 9	OL Reign	1–0	Angel City FC	Seattle, Washington
19:00	Quinn (yellow card) 26'; Balcer 31' (yellow card) 61'; Latsko (yellow card) 51'; Rapinoe (yellow card) 58' (yellow-red card) 74'	Box; Report	Lussi (yellow card) 50'; McCaskill (yellow card) 72'; Nielsen (yellow card) 73'	Stadium: Lumen Field; Attendance: 6,367; Referee: Karen Callado

July 1, 2022 10	OL Reign	2–0	North Carolina Courage	Seattle, Washington
19:00	Fishlock 52'; Balcer 74'	Box; Report	Speck (yellow card) 55'; Kerolin (yellow card) 85'	Stadium: Lumen Field; Attendance: 7,519; Referee: Brad Jensen

July 10, 2022 11	OL Reign	2–2	Portland Thorns FC	Seattle, Washington
15:00	Athens 13'; Balcer 81'; Fishlock (yellow card) 87'; Harvey (yellow card) 87'	Box; Report	McClernon 12' (o.g.); Sugita 60'	Stadium: Lumen Field; Attendance: 9,032; Referee: Mark Allatin

July 17, 2022 12	Kansas City Current	1–0	OL Reign	Kansas City, Kansas
16:00	LaBonta 18' (pen.); Loera (yellow card) 90'	Box; Report	Hiatt (yellow card) 74'	Stadium: Children's Mercy Park; Attendance: 7,246; Referee: Alex Billeter

July 30, 2022 13	Angel City FC	2–3	OL Reign	Los Angeles, California
19:30	Roccaro 9'; McCaskill 28' (pen.) (yellow card) 56'	Box; Report	Cook (yellow card) 27'; Fishlock 54'; Huerta 64'; Heath 89'	Stadium: Banc of California Stadium; Attendance: 22,000; Referee: Ekaterina Koroleva

August 2, 2022 14	Racing Louisville FC	1–1	OL Reign	Louisville, Kentucky
17:00	Fox (yellow card) 36'; Davis 45+1' (yellow card) 61'	Box; Report	Fishlock 2'; Huitema (yellow card) 55'; Heath (yellow card) 90+2'	Stadium: Lynn Family Stadium; Attendance: 5,107; Referee: Laura Rodriguez

August 7, 2022 15	OL Reign	1–2	Houston Dash	Seattle, Washington
15:00	Rapinoe 16'; Huitema (yellow card) 40'; Quinn (yellow card) 52'; Barnes (yellow card) 64'; López (yellow card) 85'	Box; Report	Prisock (yellow card) 18'; Chapman (yellow card) 36'; Salmon 53' (pen.), 55'; Groom (yellow card) 65'	Stadium: Lumen Field; Attendance: 7,252; Referee: Danielle Chesky

August 14, 2022 16	OL Reign	4–1	NJ/NY Gotham FC	Seattle, Washington
12:00	Lavelle 15'; Rapinoe 42' (pen.), 69'; Freeman 73' (o.g.); Barnes (yellow card) 87'; Heath (yellow card) 90'	Box; Report	Johnson (yellow card) 24'; Jean (yellow card) 41'; Smith 72'	Stadium: Lumen Field; Attendance: 7,048; Referee: Matthew Corrigan

August 26, 2022 17	Orlando Pride	1–2	OL Reign	Orlando, Florida
16:00	Dougherty Howard 37'; Strom (yellow card) 38'; Abello (yellow card) 65'	Box; Report	Balcer 56'; Lavelle (yellow card) 64'; Rapinoe 90+2' (yellow card) 90+3'	Stadium: Exploria Stadium; Attendance: 4,588; Referee: Elvis Osmanovic

September 9, 2022 18	OL Reign	2–2	Chicago Red Stars	Seattle, Washington
19:00	Huitema 18'; Lavelle 80'	Box; Report	Stevens 45+2'; Colaprico 68' (pen.)	Stadium: Lumen Field; Attendance: 7,427; Referee: Allen Chapman

September 17, 2022 19	North Carolina Courage	1–2	OL Reign	Cary, North Carolina
16:30	Cook 6' (o.g.); O'Sullivan (yellow card) 45+2'	Box; Report	Lavelle 11'; Rapinoe 26'; Latsko (yellow card) 83'; McClernon (yellow card) 90+1'	Stadium: WakeMed Soccer Park; Attendance: 6,398; Referee: Ricardo Fierro

September 21, 2022 20	NJ/NY Gotham FC	0–1	OL Reign	Harrison, New Jersey
16:00	Krieger (yellow card) 57'; Bike (yellow card) 84'	Box; Report	Huitema (yellow card) 24'; Rapinoe 58' (pen.); Huerta (yellow card) 77'; Fishlock (yellow card) 90+1'	Stadium: Red Bull Arena; Attendance: 2,274; Referee: Anya Voigt

September 24, 2022 21	Houston Dash	0–2	OL Reign	Houston, Texas
17:30	Schmidt (yellow card) 60'; Visalli (yellow card) 78'; Groom (yellow card) 87'	Box; Report	Balcer 29'; Fishlock (yellow card) 60'; Rapinoe (yellow card) 67'; Latsko 76'	Stadium: PNC Stadium; Attendance: 7,798; Referee: Matthew Franz

October 1, 2022 22	OL Reign	3–0	Orlando Pride	Seattle, Washington
19:00	Rapinoe 8'; Huitema 24'; Balcer 31' (yellow card) 47'	Box; Report	Montefusco (yellow card) 29'; Hanson (yellow card) 56'; Petersen (yellow card) 69'; Dougherty Howard (yellow card) 90'	Stadium: Lumen Field; Attendance: 10,746; Referee: Ekaterina Koroleva

==== Regular-season standings ====
Pos	Team	Pld	W	D	L	GF	GA	GD	Pts	Qualification
1	OL Reign	22	11	7	4	32	19	+13	40	NWSL Shield, Playoffs – semi-finals
2	Portland Thorns FC (C)	22	10	9	3	49	24	+25	39	Playoffs – semi-finals
3	San Diego Wave FC	22	10	6	6	32	21	+11	36	Playoffs – first round
4	Houston Dash	22	10	6	6	35	27	+8	36	Playoffs – first round
5	Kansas City Current	22	10	6	6	29	29	0	36	Playoffs – first round
6	Chicago Red Stars	22	9	6	7	34	28	+6	33	Playoffs – first round
7	North Carolina Courage	22	9	5	8	46	33	+13	32	
8	Angel City FC	22	8	5	9	23	27	−4	29	
9	Racing Louisville FC	22	5	8	9	23	35	−12	23	
10	Orlando Pride	22	5	7	10	22	45	−23	22	
11	Washington Spirit	22	3	10	9	26	33	−7	19	
12	NJ/NY Gotham FC	22	4	1	17	16	46	−30	13	

Source: NWSL
Rules for classification: Tiebreakers
(C) Champions

===== Results summary =====
Overall								Home						Away					
Pld	W	D	L	GF	GA	GD	Pts	W	D	L	GF	GA	GD	W	D	L	GF	GA	GD
22	11	7	4	32	19	+13	40	6	4	1	19	9	+10	5	3	3	13	10	+3

Last updated: October 1, 2022.
Source: NWSLsoccer.com

===== Results by matchday =====
Matchday	1	2	3	4	5	6	7	8	9	10	11	12	13	14	15	16	17	18	19	20	21	22
Stadium	A	H	A	H	H	H	A	A	H	H	H	A	A	A	H	H	A	H	A	A	A	H
Result	L	D	D	D	W	W	L	D	W	W	D	L	W	D	L	W	W	D	W	W	W	W
Position (Note: RGN's position at the end of the day on which their match was played.)	8	10	9	9	7	3	6	6	4	4	4	6	4	4	6	5	4	5	5	3	1	1

Updated to match(es) played on October 1, 2022. Source: NWSLsoccer.com
A = Away; H = Home; W = Win; D = Draw; L = Loss

=== Playoffs ===
October 23, 2022 Semifinal	OL Reign	0–2	Kansas City Current	Seattle, Washington
16:30		Box; Report	Loera 4'; Hamilton 63'	Stadium: Lumen Field; Attendance: 21,491; Referee: Alex Billeter

=== Challenge Cup ===
==== Group stage ====
March 18, 2022	OL Reign	1–1	Portland Thorns FC	Seattle, Washington
19:00	Cook (yellow card) 15'; Huerta 19'; Barnes (yellow card) 66'; Lavelle (yellow card) 83'; Watt (yellow card) 89'	Box; Report	Kuikka (yellow card) 24'; Sinclair 28'; Sugita (yellow card) 90+1'	Stadium: Lumen Field; Attendance: 7,343; Referee: Kevin Broadley

March 26, 2022	Angel City FC	1–3	OL Reign	Fullerton, California
13:00	McCaskill (red card) 31'; Lussi 67'	Box; Report	Latsko 12'; Cook 17'; Angelina 50'; Barnes (yellow card) 90+1'	Stadium: Titan Stadium; Attendance: 4,156; Referee: Ekaterina Koroleva

April 2, 2022	Portland Thorns FC	0–1	OL Reign	Portland, Oregon
19:00		Box; Report	Lavelle 74'; López (yellow card) 80'	Stadium: Providence Park; Attendance: 12,034; Referee: Elijio Arreguin

April 14, 2022	OL Reign	3–1	San Diego Wave FC	Seattle, Washington
19:00	Stanton 2'; Balcer 8'; Hiatt 11'	Box; Report	Morgan 24'	Stadium: Lumen Field; Attendance: 4,803; Referee: Adorae Monroy

April 17, 2022	OL Reign	2–1	Angel City FC	Seattle, Washington
16:00	Balcer 34'; Van der Jagt 90+4'	Box; Report	Charley 83'	Stadium: Lumen Field; Attendance: 5,660; Referee: Brandon Stevis

April 23, 2022	San Diego Wave FC	1–1	OL Reign	San Diego, California
19:00	Sheridan (yellow card) 13'; Morgan 45+5' (pen.); Jakobsson (yellow card) 65'; Turnbow (yellow card) 69' (yellow-red card) 82'	Box; Report	Watt 13'; Fishlock (yellow card) 69'	Stadium: Torero Stadium; Attendance: 6,000; Referee: Samantha Martinez

===== Divisional standings =====
Pos	Team	Pld	W	T	L	GF	GA	GD	Pts	Qualification	RGN	POR	SD	LA
1	OL Reign	6	4	2	0	11	5	+6	14	Advance to knockout stage	—	1–1	3–1	2–1
2	Portland Thorns FC	6	3	1	2	8	5	+3	10		0–1	—	3–2	3–0
3	San Diego Wave FC	6	1	2	3	9	11	−2	5		1–1	0–1	—	4–2
4	Angel City FC	6	1	1	4	6	13	−7	4		1–3	1–0	1–1	—

Source: NWSL
Rules for classification: 1) Total points; 2) Total goal differential; 3) Total number of goals scored; 4) Head-to-head points record; 5) Head-to-head goal differential; 6) Head-to-head number of goals scored; 7) Fewest disciplinary points; 8) Drawing of lots

==== Knockout stage ====
May 4, 2022 Semifinal	OL Reign	0–0 (8–9 p)	Washington Spirit	Washington, D.C.
17:00	Lavelle (yellow card) 18'	Box; Report	Ward (yellow card) 70'; Roddar (yellow card) 87'; Rodman (yellow card) 90+1'	Stadium: Audi Field; Attendance: 3,015; Referee: Greg Dopka
	Penalties
	Lavelle (penalty scored); Cook (penalty scored); Miramontez (penalty scored); Rapinoe (penalty scored); Balcer (penalty scored); Huerta (penalty scored); Watt (penalty scored); Stanton (penalty missed); Hiatt (penalty scored); Fishlock (penalty missed)		(penalty scored) Hatch; (penalty scored) Sonnett; (penalty scored) Kingsbury; (penalty scored) Sanchez; (penalty scored) Rodman; (penalty scored) Bailey; (penalty scored) Roddar; (penalty missed) Alexander; (penalty scored) Heilferty; (penalty scored) Staab

== Appearances and goals ==
As of October 23, 2022; only players who have made appearances are listed.

No.	Pos	Nat	Player	Total		Regular season		Playoffs		Challenge Cup	
No.	Pos	Nat	Player	Apps	Goals	Apps	Goals	Apps	Goals	Apps	Goals
Goalkeepers:
91	GK	(United States) USA	Phallon Tullis-Joyce	30	0	22	0	1	0	7	0
Defenders:
3	DF	(United States) USA	Lauren Barnes	26	0	19	0	1	0	6	0
4	DF	(United States) USA	Alana Cook	27	1	19	0	1	0	6+1	1
11	DF	(United States) USA	Sofia Huerta	27	2	18+1	1	1	0	6+1	1
14	DF	(Mexico) MEX	Jimena López	11	0	4+3	0	0	0	1+3	0
17	DF	(United States) USA	Sam Hiatt	27	1	19	0	1	0	7	1
19	DF	(United States) USA	Sinclaire Miramontez	7	0	3+1	0	0	0	1+2	0
21	DF	(United States) USA	Phoebe McClernon	13	0	6+4	0	0+1	0	1+1	0
Midfielders:
2	MF	(United States) USA	Nikki Stanton	20	1	3+10	0	0+1	0	1+5	1
5	MF	(Canada) CAN	Quinn	24	0	14+3	0	1	0	5+1	0
6	MF	(Brazil) BRA	Angelina	12	1	6+2	0	0	0	4	1
10	MF	(Wales) WAL	Jess Fishlock	27	4	18+1	4	1	0	6+1	0
12	MF	(United States) USA	Olivia Athens	10	1	1+7	1	0	0	0+2	0
13	MF	(United States) USA	Marley Canales	4	0	1+3	0	0	0	0	0
16	MF	(United States) USA	Rose Lavelle	23	6	17	5	1	0	4+1	1
33	MF	(United States) USA	Olivia Van der Jagt	26	1	13+8	0	0+1	0	3+1	1
Forwards:
8	FW	(United States) USA	Bethany Balcer	27	9	16+3	7	1	0	6+1	2
9	FW	(Canada) CAN	Jordyn Huitema	11	2	9+1	2	1	0	0	0
15	FW	(United States) USA	Megan Rapinoe	16	7	9+5	7	1	0	0+1	0
23	FW	(United States) USA	Tziarra King	20	2	7+8	2	0+1	0	2+2	0
24	FW	(United States) USA	Veronica Latsko	27	2	9+11	1	0	0	7	1
77	FW	(United States) USA	Tobin Heath	5	1	0+5	1	0	0	0	0
Players who left the team during the season:
7	FW	(United States) USA	Ally Watt	21	1	3+11	0	0	0	4+3	1
22	DF	(United States) USA	Ryanne Brown	1	0	0+1	0	0	0	0	0
26	MF	(Scotland) SCO	Kim Little	6	0	6	0	0	0	0	0
Own goals for:
	DF	(United States) USA	Mandy Freeman (NJY, August 14)	1	1	1	1	0	0	0	0

== Transfers ==
For incoming transfers, dates listed are when OL Reign officially signed the players to the roster. Transactions where only the rights to the players are acquired (e.g., draft picks) are not listed. For outgoing transfers, dates listed are when OL Reign officially removed the players from its roster, not when they signed with another team. If a player later signed with another team, her new team will be noted, but the date listed here remains the one when she was officially removed from the OL Reign roster.

=== Transfers in ===
Date	Player	Pos.	Signed From	Notes	Ref.
December 2, 2021	(United States) Nikki Stanton	MF	(United States) Chicago Red Stars	Traded in exchange for the natural third-round pick in the 2022 NWSL Draft	
December 10, 2021	(United States) Sinclaire Miramontez	DF	(United States) Racing Louisville	Acquired off waivers	
December 18, 2021	(United States) Phoebe McClernon	DF	(United States) Orlando Pride	Traded in exchange for the No. 10 pick in the 2022 NWSL Draft, the natural second-round pick in the 2023 NWSL Draft, Leah Pruitt, and Celia	
January 14, 2022	(United States) Veronica Latsko	FW	(United States) Houston Dash	Rights acquired in exchange for the natural third-round pick in the 2023 NWSL Draft and $30,000 in allocation money	
January 20, 2022	(Hungary) Zsani Kaján	FW	(United States) St. John's Red Storm	Draftee	
January 21, 2022	(United States) Olivia Athens	MF	(United States) UCLA Bruins	Free	
January 24, 2022	(United States) Laurel Ivory	GK	(United States) Virginia Cavaliers	Free	
January 24, 2022	(United States) Claudia Dickey	GK	(United States) North Carolina Tar Heels	Draftee	
January 25, 2022	(United States) Alyssa Malonson	DF	(United States) Auburn Tigers	Rights acquired from North Carolina Courage in exchange for the rights to Frankie Tagliaferri	
March 18, 2022	(United States) Olivia Van der Jagt	MF	(United States) Washington Huskies	Draftee	
April 11, 2022	(United States) Ryanne Brown	DF	(United States) Wake Forest Demon Deacons	Signed as National Team Replacement player	
April 11, 2022	(United States) Marley Canales	MF	(United States) UCLA Bruins	Signed as National Team Replacement player	
June 16, 2022	(United States) Tobin Heath	FW	(England) Arsenal	Rights acquired from Racing Louisville in exchange for a second- and a fourth-round pick in the 2023 NWSL Draft and $50,000 in allocation money	
June 18, 2022	(Canada) Jordyn Huitema	FW	(France) Paris Saint-Germain	Undisclosed	
July 1, 2022	(United States) Ryanne Brown	DF		Signed as National Team Replacement player	
July 1, 2022	(United States) Elli Burris	DF		Signed as National Team Replacement player	
July 1, 2022	(United States) Jodi Ülkekul	DF	(Spain) CD Castellón	Signed as National Team Replacement player	
August 17, 2022	(United States) Jodi Ülkekul	DF		Free	

==== Draft picks ====
Draft picks are not automatically signed to the team roster. Only those who are signed to a contract will be listed as incoming transfers.

Player	Pos.	Previous Team	Notes	Ref.
(Hungary) Zsani Kaján	FW	(United States) St. John's Red Storm	No. 8 pick	
(United States) Claudia Dickey	GK	(United States) North Carolina Tar Heels	No. 20 pick	
(United States) Ryanne Brown	FW	(United States) Wake Forest Demon Deacons	No. 21 pick	
(United States) Kaile Halvorsen	FW	(United States) Santa Clara Broncos	No. 32 pick	
(United States) Olivia Van der Jagt	MF	(United States) Washington Huskies	No. 33 pick	
(United States) Marley Canales	MF	(United States) UCLA Bruins	No. 47 pick	

=== Transfers out ===
Date	Player	Pos.	Destination Team	Notes	Ref.
December 8, 2021	(Costa Rica) Shirley Cruz	MF	(Costa Rica) Alajuelense	Waived	
December 8, 2021	(New Zealand) Rosie White	MF		Waived	
December 8, 2021	(United States) Steph Cox	DF		Retired	
December 8, 2021	(Thailand) Miranda Nild	FW	(Iceland) Selfoss	Team option declined	
December 10, 2021	(Japan) Nicole Momiki	FW	(Sweden) Linköping	Undisclosed	
December 16, 2021	(United States) Dani Weatherholt	MF	(United States) Angel City FC	No. 1 pick in the 2022 NWSL Expansion Draft	
December 16, 2021	(United States) Kristen McNabb	DF	(United States) San Diego Wave	No. 4 pick in the 2022 NWSL Expansion Draft	
December 18, 2021	(United States) Kelcie Hedge	MF	(United States) Houston Dash	Traded in exchange for the No. 21 pick in the 2022 NWSL Draft and $15,000 in allocation money	
December 18, 2021	(United States) Leah Pruitt	FW	(United States) Orlando Pride	Traded along with the No. 10 pick in the 2022 NWSL Draft, the natural second-round pick in the 2023 NWSL Draft, and Celia in exchange for Phoebe McClernon	
December 18, 2021	(Spain) Celia	DF	(United States) Orlando Pride	Traded along with the No. 10 pick in the 2022 NWSL Draft, the natural second-round pick in the 2023 NWSL Draft, and Leah Pruitt in exchange for Phoebe McClernon	
December 22, 2021	(United States) Ella Dederick	GK	(United States) Houston Dash	Traded in exchange for the natural third-round pick in the 2023 NWSL Draft	
January 25, 2022	(United States) Amber Brooks	DF	(United States) Washington Spirit	Waived	
March 3, 2022	(United States) Cosette Morché	GK	(France) GPSO 92 Issy	Undisclosed	
March 11, 2022	(United States) Madison Hammond	DF	(United States) Angel City FC	Traded in exchange for the natural second-round pick in the 2023 NWSL Draft and $45,000 in allocation money	
April 15, 2022	(United States) Ryanne Brown	DF		National Team Replacement period ended	
June 27, 2022	(Hungary) Zsani Kaján	FW	(Italy) ACF Fiorentina	Undisclosed	
July 18, 2022	(United States) Elli Burris	DF		National Team Replacement period ended	
July 18, 2022	(United States) Jodi Ülkekul	DF		National Team Replacement period ended	
August 15, 2022	(United States) Ally Watt	FW	(United States) Orlando Pride	Traded in exchange for $125,000 of allocation money	

=== Loans in ===
Start	End	Player	Pos.	Parent Team	Notes	Ref.
June 1, 2022	August 15, 2022	(Scotland) Kim Little	MF	(England) Arsenal		

=== Loans out ===
Start	End	Player	Pos.	Destination Team	Notes	Ref.
July 26, 2021	March 3, 2022	(United States) Cosette Morché	GK	(France) GPSO 92 Issy		
July 29, 2022	December 31, 2022	(United States) Ryanne Brown	DF	(Denmark) FC Nordsjælland		
July 29, 2022	December 31, 2022	(United States) Alyssa Malonson	DF	(Denmark) FC Nordsjælland		

=== New contracts ===
Date	Player	Pos.	Notes	Ref.
December 8, 2021	(United States) Madison Hammond	DF	Team option exercised	
December 8, 2021	(United States) Nikki Stanton	MF	Team option exercised	
January 19, 2022	(United States) Phoebe McClernon	DF	Signed to a new contract	
January 19, 2022	(United States) Tziarra King	FW	Re-signed	
January 21, 2022	(Wales) Jess Fishlock	MF	Re-signed	
January 26, 2022	(United States) Lauren Barnes	DF	Re-signed	
January 26, 2022	(United States) Bethany Balcer	FW	Signed to a new contract	
January 26, 2022	(United States) Megan Rapinoe	FW	Re-signed	
January 26, 2022	(United States) Rose Lavelle	MF	Re-signed	
February 21, 2022	(United States) Sofia Huerta	DF	Signed to a new contract	
April 16, 2022	(United States) Marley Canales	MF	Signed to a standard contract	
July 6, 2022	(United States) Phallon Tullis-Joyce	GK	Signed to a new contract	
July 29, 2022	(United States) Ryanne Brown	DF	Signed to a standard contract	

== Awards ==
=== NWSL annual awards ===
Nominees announced on October 14, 2022

- Coach of the Year: (England) Laura Harvey (finalist)
- Defender of the Year: (United States) Alana Cook and (United States) Sofia Huerta (finalists)
- Goalkeeper of the Year: (United States) Phallon Tullis-Joyce (finalist)
- Best XI: (United States) Alana Cook and (United States) Sofia Huerta
- Second XI: (Wales) Jess Fishlock, (United States) Rose Lavelle, and (United States) Megan Rapinoe

=== NWSL Player of the Month ===
Month	Player	Ref.
August	(United States) Megan Rapinoe	

=== NWSL Team of the Month ===
Month	Goalkeeper	Defender	Midfielder	Forward	Ref.
May	(United States) Phallon Tullis-Joyce	(United States) Alana Cook (United States) Sofia Huerta	(United States) Rose Lavelle		
July			(Wales) Jess Fishlock	(United States) Bethany Balcer	
August		(United States) Sofia Huerta (2)		(United States) Megan Rapinoe	
September/October		(United States) Alana Cook (2)	(United States) Rose Lavelle (2)	(United States) Megan Rapinoe (2)	

=== NWSL Player of the Week ===
Week	Player	Ref.
5	(United States) Sofia Huerta	
9	(Wales) Jess Fishlock	
12	(United States) Sofia Huerta (2)	
16	(United States) Megan Rapinoe	

=== NWSL Save of the Week ===
Week	Player	Ref.
CC 2	(United States) Phallon Tullis-Joyce	
CC 3	(United States) Phallon Tullis-Joyce (2)	
CC 4	(United States) Phallon Tullis-Joyce (3)	
2	(United States) Phallon Tullis-Joyce (4)	
3	(United States) Phallon Tullis-Joyce (5)	

=== NWSL Challenge Cup All-Tournament Team ===
Pos.	Player	Ref.
GK	(United States) Phallon Tullis-Joyce	
DF	(United States) Alana Cook (United States) Sofia Huerta	
MF	(United States) Rose Lavelle	

=== The Women's Cup ===
- Most Valuable Player: (United States) Tziarra King
