= 2021 OL Reign season =

OL Reign
2021 season
- Majority owner: OL Groupe
- CEO: Bill Predmore
- Head coach: Laura Harvey (from August 9); Sam Laity (interim; from July 2 to August 8); Farid Benstiti (before July 2)
- Stadium: Cheney Stadium
- NWSL: 2nd of 10
- Playoffs: Semifinals
- Challenge Cup: 2nd of 5, West Division
- Top goalscorer: League: Bethany Balcer (9); All: Bethany Balcer (9)
- Highest home attendance: 27,278 (vs. POR, August 29)
- Lowest home attendance: 1,105 (vs. CHI, April 27)
Home colors	Away colors

The 2021 OL Reign season was the team's ninth season of play and their ninth season in the National Women's Soccer League, the top division of women's soccer in the United States.

On July 2, 2021, head coach Farid Benstiti resigned and was replaced by assistant coach Sam Laity in an interim capacity. Benstiti finished with a 2–1–4 record in the regular season.

On July 15, 2021, the team announced that Laura Harvey would return as head coach after the Tokyo Olympics, where she was serving as an assistant coach for the United States women's national team. Harvey officially assumed head coaching duties on August 9, 2021.

== Team ==
=== Staff ===
As of August 9, 2021.

Technical
Head coach	Laura Harvey
Assistant coach	Sam Laity
Goalkeeper coach	Ljupčo Kmetovski
Sports Science and Medical
Director of performance	Andrew Wiseman
Director of rehabilitation	Nicole Surdyka
Athletic trainer	Kathryn Johnson
Sports psychologist	Mariah Bullock

=== Roster ===
As of September 29, 2021.

No.	Nat.	Name	Date of birth (age)	Since	Previous team	Notes (Note: denotes a season-ending injury.)
Goalkeepers
12	(France)	Sarah Bouhaddi	October 17, 1986 (aged 34)	2021	(France) Lyon	INT
20	(United States)	Cosette Morché	June 9, 1997 (aged 23)	2021	(Sweden) Eskilstuna United	LOA
33	(United States)	Ella Dederick	July 27, 1996 (aged 24)	2021	(United States) Washington State Cougars	
91	(United States)	Phallon Tullis-Joyce	October 19, 1996 (aged 24)	2021	(France) Stade de Reims	
Defenders
2	(United States)	Amber Brooks	January 23, 1991 (aged 30)	2020	(Australia) Adelaide United	
3	(United States)	Lauren Barnes (co-captain)	May 31, 1989 (aged 31)	2013	(United States) Philadelphia Independence	
4	(United States)	Alana Cook	April 11, 1997 (aged 24)	2021	(France) Paris Saint-Germain	
13	(Spain)	Celia	June 20, 1995 (aged 25)	2019	(Sweden) FC Rosengård	
14	(United States)	Steph Cox	April 3, 1986 (aged 35)	2019	Retirement	
19	(United States)	Kristen McNabb	April 17, 1994 (aged 27)	2017	(United States) Virginia Cavaliers	
27	(United States)	Sam Hiatt	January 6, 1998 (aged 23)	2020	(United States) Stanford Cardinal	
30	(Mexico)	Jimena López	January 30, 1999 (aged 22)	2021	(Spain) SD Eibar	INT
99	(United States)	Madison Hammond	November 15, 1997 (aged 23)	2020	(United States) Wake Forest Demon Deacons	
Midfielders
5	(Canada)	Quinn	August 11, 1995 (aged 25)	2019	(France) Paris FC	FED
8	(Germany)	Dzsenifer Marozsán	April 18, 1992 (aged 29)	2021	(France) Lyon	INT
10	(Wales)	Jess Fishlock	January 14, 1987 (aged 34)	2013	(England) Bristol Academy	
16	(United States)	Rose Lavelle	May 14, 1995 (aged 25)	2021	(England) Manchester City	FED
17	(United States)	Dani Weatherholt	March 17, 1994 (aged 27)	2020	(United States) Orlando Pride	
25	(United States)	Kelcie Hedge	September 19, 1997 (aged 23)	2020	(United States) Santa Clara Broncos	
26	(Brazil)	Angelina	January 26, 2000 (aged 21)	2021	(Brazil) Palmeiras	
28	(Costa Rica)	Shirley Cruz	August 28, 1985 (aged 35)	2020	(Costa Rica) Alajuelense	INT
31	(New Zealand)	Rosie White	June 6, 1993 (aged 27)	2019	(United States) Chicago Red Stars	
Forwards
7	(United States)	Ally Watt	March 12, 1997 (aged 24)	2021	(United States) North Carolina Courage	
9	(France)	Eugénie Le Sommer	May 18, 1989 (aged 31)	2021	(France) Lyon	INT
11	(United States)	Sofia Huerta	December 14, 1992 (aged 28)	2020	(Australia) Sydney FC	
15	(United States)	Megan Rapinoe (co-captain)	July 5, 1985 (aged 35)	2013	(France) Lyon	FED
21	(Japan)	Nicole Momiki	April 9, 1996 (aged 25)	2020	(Japan) Nippon TV Beleza	LOA
23	(United States)	Tziarra King	August 24, 1998 (aged 22)	2021	(United States) Utah Royals	
24	(United States)	Bethany Balcer	March 7, 1997 (aged 24)	2019	(United States) Spring Arbor Cougars	
35	(United States)	Leah Pruitt	September 5, 1997 (aged 23)	2020	(United States) North Carolina Courage	
	(Thailand)	Miranda Nild	April 1, 1997 (aged 24)	2020	(Lithuania) Gintra Universitetas	LOA

== Competitions ==
Win Tie Loss

All times are in PT unless otherwise noted.

=== Regular season ===
May 15, 2021 1	OL Reign	0–0	North Carolina Courage	Tacoma, Washington
19:00	Balcer (yellow card) 83'	Box; Report	Erceg (yellow card) 19'; Mathias (yellow card) 26'	Stadium: Cheney Stadium; Attendance: 2,104; Referee: Karen ABT

May 23, 2021 2	Portland Thorns FC	1–2	OL Reign	Portland, Oregon
15:00	Sinclair 4'; Dunn (yellow card) 9'	Box; Report	Rapinoe 9'; Cruz 15' (yellow card) 65'; Fishlock (yellow card) 35'; Cox (yellow card) 85'	Stadium: Providence Park; Attendance: 6435; Referee: Karen Callado

May 30, 2021 3	OL Reign	0–1	Washington Spirit	Tacoma, Washington
16:00	Brooks (yellow card) 88'	Box; Report	Rapinoe 52' (o.g.)	Stadium: Cheney Stadium; Attendance: 2,537; Referee: Samantha Martinez

June 5, 2021 4	NJ/NY Gotham FC	1–0	OL Reign	Harrison, New Jersey
16:00	Onumonu 13'	Box; Report	Angelina (yellow card) 67'	Stadium: Red Bull Arena; Attendance: 2,601; Referee: Joshua Encarnacion

June 19, 2021 5	North Carolina Courage	2–1	OL Reign	Cary, North Carolina
13:00	McDonald 45'; Mewis 77' (yellow card) 88'	Box; Report	Angelina (yellow card) 17'; Celia (yellow card) 73'; Fishlock 86'	Stadium: Sahlen's Stadium at WakeMed Soccer Park; Attendance: 5,026; Referee: Karen Callado

June 22, 2021 6	OL Reign	2–0	Chicago Red Stars	Tacoma, Washington
19:00	Cruz 1'; Balcer 18' (yellow card) 25'; Marozsán (yellow card) 79'; McNabb (yellow card) 90+4'	Box; Report	Gorden (yellow card) 40'; St. Georges (yellow card) 46' (yellow-red card) 90+2'	Stadium: Cheney Stadium; Attendance: 2,518; Referee: Danielle Chesky

June 26, 2021 7	OL Reign	0–3	NJ/NY Gotham FC	Tacoma, Washington
13:00	Cruz (yellow card) 47'	Box; Report	Onumonu 38'; Purce 60'; Richardson 85'	Stadium: Cheney Stadium; Attendance: 3,007; Referee: Samantha Martinez

July 2, 2021 8	Houston Dash	2–0	OL Reign	Houston, Texas
17:30	Prisock (yellow card) 44'; Gomera-Stevens (yellow card) 47'; Spencer 50'; Naughton 57'; Alozie (yellow card) 90'	Box; Report	Celia (yellow card) 17'	Stadium: BBVA Stadium; Attendance: 4,337; Referee: Adorae Monroy

July 11, 2021 9	OL Reign	2–0	Kansas City	Tacoma, Washington
16:00	Balcer 3', 29'; Barnes (yellow card) 46'; Bouhaddi (red card) 70'; Marozsán (yellow card) 79'; Le Sommer (yellow card) 90+2'	Box; Report	Weber (yellow card) 49'	Stadium: Cheney Stadium; Attendance: 3,124; Referee: Karen ABT

July 18, 2021 10	Chicago Red Stars	3–1	OL Reign	Bridgeview, Illinois
15:00	Celia 48' (o.g.); Cook 55' (o.g.); Pugh 64'	Box; Report	Balcer 12'; Celia (yellow card) 47'; King (yellow card) 73'	Stadium: SeatGeek Stadium; Attendance: 3,301; Referee: Katja Koroleva

July 24, 2021 11	Orlando Pride	0–2	OL Reign	Orlando, Florida
16:00	Turner (yellow card) 59'; Viggiano (yellow card) 68'; Leroux (yellow card) 88'	Box; Report	Fishlock 10'; Hiatt (yellow card) 15'; Cook (yellow card) 35'; King 51'; McNabb (yellow card) 89'; Barnes (yellow card) 90+1'	Stadium: Exploria Stadium; Attendance: 4,180; Referee: John Matto

July 31, 2021 12	OL Reign	2–0	Racing Louisville FC	Tacoma, Washington
19:00	Le Sommer 27', 43'; Huerta (yellow card) 86'	Box; Report		Stadium: Cheney Stadium; Attendance: 3,097; Referee: Laura Rodriguez

August 7, 2021 13	OL Reign	5–1	Houston Dash	Tacoma, Washington
19:00	Balcer 6', 45+1'; Huerta 19'; Le Sommer 35'; Fishlock 42'	Box; Report	Cook 30' (o.g.); Fields (yellow card) 49'; Alozie (yellow card) 84'	Stadium: Cheney Stadium; Attendance: 2,922; Referee: Natalie Simon

August 14, 2021 14	Kansas City	1–0	OL Reign	Kansas City, Kansas
17:00	K. Pickett (yellow card) 27'; V. Pickett 73'	Box; Report	Cook (yellow card) 47'	Stadium: Legends Field; Attendance: 5368; Referee: Alex Billeter

August 21, 2021 15	OL Reign	3–2	NJ/NY Gotham FC	Tacoma, Washington
19:00	McNabb 57'; Rapinoe 77' (pen.), 90+1' (pen.)	Box; Report	Onumonu 9', 15'; Lee (yellow card) 32'; Long (yellow card) 79'	Stadium: Cheney Stadium; Attendance: 3,657; Referee: Lukasz Szpala

August 29, 2021 16	OL Reign	2–1	Portland Thorns FC	Seattle, Washington
16:00	Huerta (yellow card) 2'; Rapinoe 16', 40' (pen.); McNabb (yellow card) 45+4'; Angelina (yellow card) 87'	Box; Report	Salem 45+4'; Kuikka (yellow card) 90+1'	Stadium: Lumen Field; Attendance: 27,278; Referee: Jon Freemon

September 1, 2021 17	Houston Dash	0–1	OL Reign	Houston, Texas
17:00	Oyster (yellow card) 46'; Spencer (yellow card) 54'; Daly (yellow card) 68'	Box; Report	Balcer 7'; King (yellow card) 86'	Stadium: BBVA Stadium; Attendance: 2569; Referee: Danielle Chesky

September 4, 2021 18	Racing Louisville FC	1–1	OL Reign	Louisville, Kentucky
16:30	Nadim 23'	Box; Report	Balcer 74' (yellow card) 80'	Stadium: Lynn Family Stadium; Attendance: 6337; Referee: Tori Penso

September 12, 2021 19	Washington Spirit	0–3	OL Reign	Washington, D.C.
14:00		Report		Stadium: Audi Field; Attendance: 0 Referee: N/A
Note: The NWSL declared a forfeit due to breaches of medical protocols by the Washington Spirit. OL Reign received a 3–0 win according to FIFA guidelines.

September 26, 2021 20	OL Reign	3–0	Orlando Pride	Tacoma, Washington
16:00	Balcer 3'; Le Sommer 28', 32'	Box; Report	Taylor (yellow card) 30'; Turner (yellow card) 62'; Riley (yellow card) 73'	Stadium: Cheney Stadium; Attendance: 5,044; Referee: Malik Badawi

October 10, 2021 21	OL Reign	3–2	Chicago Red Stars	Tacoma, Washington
16:00	Fishlock 31', 35'; Lavelle 51'	Box; Report	Pugh 14'; Wright (yellow card) 25'; Milazzo 69'	Stadium: Cheney Stadium; Attendance: 3,588; Referee: Samantha Martinez

October 13, 2021 22	Portland Thorns FC	1–1	OL Reign	Portland, Oregon
19:30	Weaver 3'	Box; Report	Rapinoe 86' (pen.); Angelina (yellow card) 90'	Stadium: Providence Park; Attendance: 11,754; Referee: Tori Penso

October 16, 2021 23	OL Reign	0–2	Washington Spirit	Tacoma, Washington
19:00	Barnes (yellow card) 27'; Le Sommer (yellow card) 48'	Box; Report	Aylmer 22'; Hatch 59'; Roddar (yellow card) 65'; Rodman (yellow card) 81'	Stadium: Cheney Stadium; Attendance: 4,009; Referee: Katja Koroleva

October 30, 2021 24	Kansas City	0–3	OL Reign	Kansas City, Kansas
17:00	LaBonta (yellow card) 44'	Box; Report	K. Pickett 35' (o.g.); Le Sommer 49', 64'; Brooks (yellow card) 90+5'	Stadium: Legends Field; Attendance: 6,345; Referee: Laura Rodriguez

==== Regular-season standings ====
Pos	Team	Pld	W	D	L	GF	GA	GD	Pts	Qualification
1	Portland Thorns FC	24	13	5	6	33	17	+16	44	NWSL Shield
2	OL Reign	24	13	3	8	37	24	+13	42	Playoffs – Semi-finals
3	Washington Spirit (C)	24	11	6	7	29	26	+3	39	Playoffs – First round
4	Chicago Red Stars	24	11	5	8	28	28	0	38	Playoffs – First round
5	NJ/NY Gotham FC	24	8	11	5	29	21	+8	35	Playoffs – First round
6	North Carolina Courage	24	9	6	9	28	23	+5	33	Playoffs – First round
7	Houston Dash	24	9	5	10	31	31	0	32	
8	Orlando Pride	24	7	7	10	27	32	−5	28	
9	Racing Louisville FC	24	5	7	12	21	40	−19	22	
10	Kansas City	24	3	7	14	15	36	−21	16	

Source: NWSL
Rules for classification: Tiebreakers
(C) Champions

===== Results summary =====
Overall								Home						Away					
Pld	W	D	L	GF	GA	GD	Pts	W	D	L	GF	GA	GD	W	D	L	GF	GA	GD
24	13	3	8	37	24	+13	42	8	1	3	22	12	+10	5	2	5	15	12	+3

Last updated: October 30, 2021.
Source: NWSLsoccer.com

===== Results by matchday =====
Matchday	1	2	3	4	5	6	7	8	9	10	11	12	13	14	15	16	17	18	19	20	21	22	23	24
Stadium	H	A	H	A	A	H	H	A	H	A	A	H	H	A	H	H	A	A	A	H	H	A	H	A
Result	D	W	L	L	L	W	L	L	W	L	W	W	W	L	W	W	W	D	W	W	W	D	L	W
Position (Note: RGN's position at the end of the day on which their match was played.)	4	3	7	7	8	8	9	9	9	9	8	8	5	7	3	3	3	2	2	2	2	2	2	2

Updated to match(es) played on October 30, 2021. Source: NWSLsoccer.com
A = Away; H = Home; W = Win; D = Draw; L = Loss

=== Playoffs ===
November 14, 2021 Semifinals	OL Reign	1–2	Washington Spirit	Tacoma, Washington
12:00	Le Sommer 3'; Rapinoe (yellow card) 88'; Watt (yellow card) 89'	Box; Report	Rodman 12'; O'Hara (yellow card) 61'; Sanchez 68'	Stadium: Cheney Stadium; Attendance: 5,273; Referee: Matthew Franz

=== Challenge Cup ===
April 16, 2021	OL Reign	0–0	Houston Dash	Tacoma, Washington
19:00	Weatherholt (yellow card) 23'	Box; Report	Groom (yellow card) 25'	Stadium: Cheney Stadium; Attendance: 1,263; Referee: Katja Koroleva

April 21, 2021	Portland Thorns FC	2–0	OL Reign	Portland, Oregon
19:00	Horan 17' (yellow card) 72'; Charley 46'	Box; Report	Brooks (yellow card) 65'	Stadium: Providence Park; Attendance: 5289; Referee: Karen ABT

April 27, 2021	OL Reign	3–2	Chicago Red Stars	Tacoma, Washington
19:00	Huerta 41'; Pruitt 70'; King 87'	Box; Report	Pugh 38'; Gautrat 90'	Stadium: Cheney Stadium; Attendance: 1,105; Referee: Laura Rodriguez

May 3, 2021	Kansas City	1–2	OL Reign	Kansas City, Kansas
17:00	Weber 6'	Box; Report	Fishlock 34' (pen.) (yellow card) 59'; King (yellow card) 35'; Pruitt (yellow card) 79'; Celia 84'	Stadium: Field of Legends; Attendance: 3079; Referee: Karen Callado

==== Divisional standings ====
Pos	Team	Pld	W	D	L	GF	GA	GD	Pts	Qualification
1	Portland Thorns FC	4	3	1	0	6	2	+4	10	Qualification for the Championship
2	OL Reign	4	2	1	1	5	5	0	7	
3	Houston Dash	4	1	3	0	4	2	+2	6	
4	Chicago Red Stars	4	0	2	2	3	5	−2	2	
5	Kansas City	4	0	1	3	4	8	−4	1	

Source: NWSL
Rules for classification: Tiebreakers

== Appearances and goals ==
As of November 14, 2021; only players who have made appearances are listed.

No.	Pos	Nat	Player	Total		Regular season		Playoffs		Challenge Cup	
No.	Pos	Nat	Player	Apps	Goals	Apps	Goals	Apps	Goals	Apps	Goals
Goalkeepers:
12	GK	(France) FRA	Sarah Bouhaddi	20	0	19	0	1	0	0	0
33	GK	(United States) USA	Ella Dederick	3	0	1+2	0	0	0	0	0
91	GK	(United States) USA	Phallon Tullis-Joyce	1	0	0+1	0	0	0	0	0
Defenders:
2	DF	(United States) USA	Amber Brooks	14	0	2+9	0	0	0	2+1	0
3	DF	(United States) USA	Lauren Barnes	24	0	20+1	0	1	0	2	0
4	DF	(United States) USA	Alana Cook	20	0	19	0	1	0	0	0
13	DF	(Spain) ESP	Celia	16	1	9+3	0	0	0	4	1
14	DF	(United States) USA	Steph Cox	5	0	1+2	0	0	0	1+1	0
19	DF	(United States) USA	Kristen McNabb	25	1	15+6	1	1	0	3	0
27	DF	(United States) USA	Sam Hiatt	9	0	9	0	0	0	0	0
30	DF	(Mexico) MEX	Jimena López	2	0	0+2	0	0	0	0	0
99	DF	(United States) USA	Madison Hammond	17	0	10+3	0	0	0	4	0
Midfielders:
5	MF	(Canada) CAN	Quinn	16	0	8+4	0	1	0	3	0
8	MF	(Germany) GER	Dzsenifer Marozsán	20	0	16+3	0	1	0	0	0
10	MF	(Wales) WAL	Jess Fishlock	27	6	21+2	5	1	0	2+1	1
16	MF	(United States) USA	Rose Lavelle	12	1	11	1	1	0	0	0
17	MF	(United States) USA	Dani Weatherholt	24	0	11+8	0	0+1	0	2+2	0
25	MF	(United States) USA	Kelcie Hedge	2	0	0+2	0	0	0	0	0
26	MF	(Brazil) BRA	Angelina	19	0	4+12	0	0	0	2+1	0
28	MF	(Costa Rica) CRC	Shirley Cruz	16	2	5+7	2	0	0	3+1	0
31	MF	(New Zealand) NZL	Rosie White	2	0	1	0	0	0	0+1	0
Forwards:
7	FW	(United States) USA	Ally Watt	5	0	0+4	0	0+1	0	0	0
9	FW	(France) FRA	Eugénie Le Sommer	18	8	15+2	7	1	1	0	0
11	FW	(United States) USA	Sofia Huerta	28	2	22+1	1	1	0	4	1
15	FW	(United States) USA	Megan Rapinoe	14	6	8+3	6	1	0	1+1	0
23	FW	(United States) USA	Tziarra King	19	2	7+8	1	0	0	2+2	1
24	FW	(United States) USA	Bethany Balcer	27	9	13+10	9	0+1	0	2+1	0
35	FW	(United States) USA	Leah Pruitt	15	1	3+8	0	0	0	3+1	1
Players who left the team during the season:
1	GK	(England) ENG	Karen Bardsley	7	0	3	0	0	0	4	0
18	DF	(United States) USA	Machaela George	2	0	0+2	0	0	0	0	0
21	FW	(Japan) JPN	Nicole Momiki	3	0	0	0	0	0	0+3	0
22	FW	(United States) USA	Jasmyne Spencer	2	0	0	0	0	0	0+2	0
Own goals for:
	DF	(United States) USA	Kiki Pickett (KC, October 30)	1	1	1	1	0	0	0	0
Others for:
			Forfeit (WAS, September 12)	1	3	1	3	0	0	0	0

== Transfers ==
For incoming transfers, dates listed are when OL Reign officially signed the players to the roster. Transactions where only the rights to the players are acquired (e.g., draft picks) are not listed. For outgoing transfers, dates listed are when OL Reign officially removed the players from its roster, not when they signed with another team. If a player later signed with another team, her new team will be noted, but the date listed here remains the one when she was officially removed from the OL Reign roster.

=== Transfers in ===
Date	Player	Pos	Signed From	Notes	Ref
October 22, 2020	(United States) Crystal Dunn	DF	(United States) North Carolina Courage	Traded in exchange for Casey Murphy and $140,000 in allocation money	
December 4, 2020	(United States) Cosette Morché	GK	(Sweden) Eskilstuna United	Free	
December 7, 2020	(United States) Ally Watt	FW	(United States) North Carolina Courage	Traded in exchange for Taylor Smith and the rights to Jodie Taylor	
January 4, 2021	(United States) Tziarra King	FW	(United States) Kansas City	Traded, along with a second-round pick in the 2022 NWSL Draft, in exchange for Darian Jenkins, the rights to Meg Brandt, and a fourth-round pick in the 2021 NWSL Draft	
January 5, 2021	(Brazil) Angelina	MF	(Brazil) Palmeiras	Undisclosed	
March 15, 2021	(United States) Ella Dederick	GK	(United States) Washington State Cougars	Free	
April 5, 2021	(United States) Jenna Holtz	MF	(Portugal) Valadares Gaia	Signed as National Team Replacement Player	
May 17, 2021	(United States) Rose Lavelle	MF	(England) Manchester City	Signed as federation player	
June 5, 2021	(United States) Phallon Tullis-Joyce	GK	(France) Stade de Reims	Undisclosed	
June 7, 2021	(United States) Alana Cook	DF	(France) Paris Saint-Germain	Undisclosed	
June 15, 2021	(Mexico) Jimena López	DF	(Spain) SD Eibar	Undisclosed	

==== Draft picks ====
Draft picks are not automatically signed to the team roster. Only those who are signed to a contract will be listed as incoming transfers. Only trades involving draft picks and executed on the day of the 2021 NWSL Draft will be listed in the notes.

Player	Pos	Previous Team	Notes	Ref
(Mexico) Jimena López	DF	(United States) Texas A&M Aggies	No. 28 overall pick	

=== Transfers out ===
Date	Player	Pos	Destination Team	Notes	Ref
October 18, 2020	(United States) Carly Nelson	GK	(United States) Kansas City	Out of contract	
October 18, 2020	(United States) Kim Hazlett	DF		Out of contract	
October 22, 2020	(United States) Casey Murphy	GK	(United States) North Carolina Courage	Traded, along with $140,000 in allocation money, in exchange for Crystal Dunn	
October 22, 2020	(United States) Crystal Dunn	DF	(United States) Portland Thorns	Traded in exchange for Portland's natural first-round pick in the 2022 NWSL Draft, an international slot for 2021, and up to $250,000 in allocation money	
November 12, 2020	(United States) Julia Ashley	DF	(United States) Racing Louisville	Selected with the 2nd pick in the 2020 NWSL Expansion Draft	
November 12, 2020	(United States) Michelle Betos	GK	(United States) Racing Louisville	Selected with the 12th pick in the 2020 NWSL Expansion Draft	
December 7, 2020	(United States) Taylor Smith	DF	(United States) North Carolina Courage	Traded, along with the rights to Jodie Taylor, in exchange for Ally Watt	
January 4, 2021	(United States) Darian Jenkins	FW	(United States) Kansas City	Traded, along with the rights to Meg Brandt and a fourth-round pick in the 2021 NWSL Draft, in exchange for Tziarra King and a second-round pick in the 2022 NWSL Draft	
February 18, 2021	(United States) Morgan Andrews	MF		Waived	
April 20, 2021	(United States) Jenna Holtz	MF		National Team Replacement Player agreement concluded	
April 27, 2021	(United States) Allie Long	MF	(United States) Gotham FC	Traded in exchange for $80,000 in allocation money and a second-round pick in the 2022 NWSL Draft; the teams also swapped places in the Discovery Ranking order	
May 31, 2021	(United States) Jasmyne Spencer	FW	(United States) Houston Dash	Traded in exchange for the natural third-round pick in the 2022 NWSL Draft	
September 29, 2021	(United States) Machaela George	DF	(Portugal) Braga	Waived	

=== Loans in ===
Start	End	Player	Pos	Parent Team	Notes	Ref
February 23, 2021	June 30, 2021	(England) Karen Bardsley	GK	(England) Manchester City		
June 5, 2021	December 31, 2021	(France) Sarah Bouhaddi	GK	(France) Lyon		
June 5, 2021	December 31, 2021	(Germany) Dzsenifer Marozsán	MF	(France) Lyon		
June 6, 2021	December 31, 2021	(France) Eugénie Le Sommer	FW	(France) Lyon		

=== Loans out ===
Start	End	Player	Pos	Destination Team	Notes	Ref
August 12, 2020	December 31, 2020	(Canada) Quinn	MF	(Sweden) Vittsjö		
August 14, 2020	November 30, 2020	(United States) Lauren Barnes	DF	(Sweden) Kristianstad		
August 14, 2020	November 30, 2020	(Japan) Nicole Momiki	FW	(Sweden) Linköping		
August 19, 2020	April 5, 2021	(Wales) Jess Fishlock	MF	(England) Reading		
August 28, 2020	December 31, 2020	(United States) Machaela George	DF	(Denmark) Fortuna Hjørring		
August 28, 2020	February 28, 2021	(United States) Darian Jenkins	FW	(France) Bordeaux	Traded to Kansas City on January 4, 2021	
September 23, 2020	February 28, 2021	(Spain) Celia	DF	(France) Lyon		
March 15, 2021	December 31, 2021	(Thailand) Miranda Nild	FW	(Sweden) Kristianstad		
July 19, 2021	December 31, 2021	(Japan) Nicole Momiki	FW	(Sweden) Linköping		
July 26, 2021	June 30, 2022	(United States) Cosette Morché	GK	(France) GPSO 92 Issy		

=== New contracts ===
Date	Player	Pos	Notes	Ref
December 4, 2020	(United States) Sam Hiatt	DF	Signed to a standard agreement	
December 4, 2020	(United States) Kristen McNabb	DF	Re-signed	
December 4, 2020	(Costa Rica) Shirley Cruz	MF	Re-signed	
December 7, 2020	(United States) Dani Weatherholt	MF	Re-signed	
December 9, 2020	(United States) Leah Pruitt	FW	Re-signed	
December 21, 2020	(Japan) Nicole Momiki	FW	Signed to a new contract	
December 21, 2020	(New Zealand) Rosie White	MF	Re-signed	
December 22, 2020	(United States) Jasmyne Spencer	FW	Re-signed	
January 25, 2021	(United States) Steph Cox	DF	Re-signed	
February 18, 2021	(United States) Allie Long	MF	Signed to a standard agreement	
March 15, 2021	(Thailand) Miranda Nild	FW	Signed to a standard agreement	
June 4, 2021	(United States) Ally Watt	FW	Signed to a new contract	
July 26, 2021	(United States) Cosette Morché	GK	Team option exercised	

== Awards ==
=== NWSL annual awards ===
- Coach of the Year: (England) Laura Harvey
- Most Valuable Player: (Wales) Jess Fishlock
- Defender of the Year: (United States) Alana Cook (finalist)
- Best XI: (United States) Alana Cook, (Wales) Jess Fishlock, (France) Eugénie Le Sommer
- Second XI: (United States) Bethany Balcer, (United States) Sofia Huerta

=== Team awards ===
Announced on November 23, 2021.

- Most Valuable Player: (Wales) Jess Fishlock
- Golden Boot: (United States) Bethany Balcer
- Young Player of the Year: (United States) Alana Cook
- Community Champion: (United States) Dani Weatherholt

=== NWSL Player of the Month ===
Month	Player	Ref.
August	(United States) Megan Rapinoe	
September	(United States) Bethany Balcer	

=== NWSL Team of the Month ===
Month	Players	Ref.
May	(Wales) Jess Fishlock	
August	(Wales) Jess Fishlock (United States) Megan Rapinoe	
September	(United States) Bethany Balcer (United States) Sofia Huerta (France) Eugénie Le Sommer (Germany) Dzsenifer Marozsán	
October	(Wales) Jess Fishlock (United States) Sofia Huerta	

=== NWSL Player of the Week ===
Week	Player	Ref.
CC4	(Spain) Celia	
10	(United States) Tziarra King	
11	(France) Eugénie Le Sommer	
12	(United States) Bethany Balcer	
14	(United States) Megan Rapinoe	
16	(United States) Bethany Balcer	
18	(France) Eugénie Le Sommer	
22	(France) Eugénie Le Sommer	

=== NWSL Save of the Week ===
Week	Player	Ref.
14	(France) Sarah Bouhaddi	
21	(Wales) Jess Fishlock	
