= Ally Brazier =

American soccer player (born 1997)

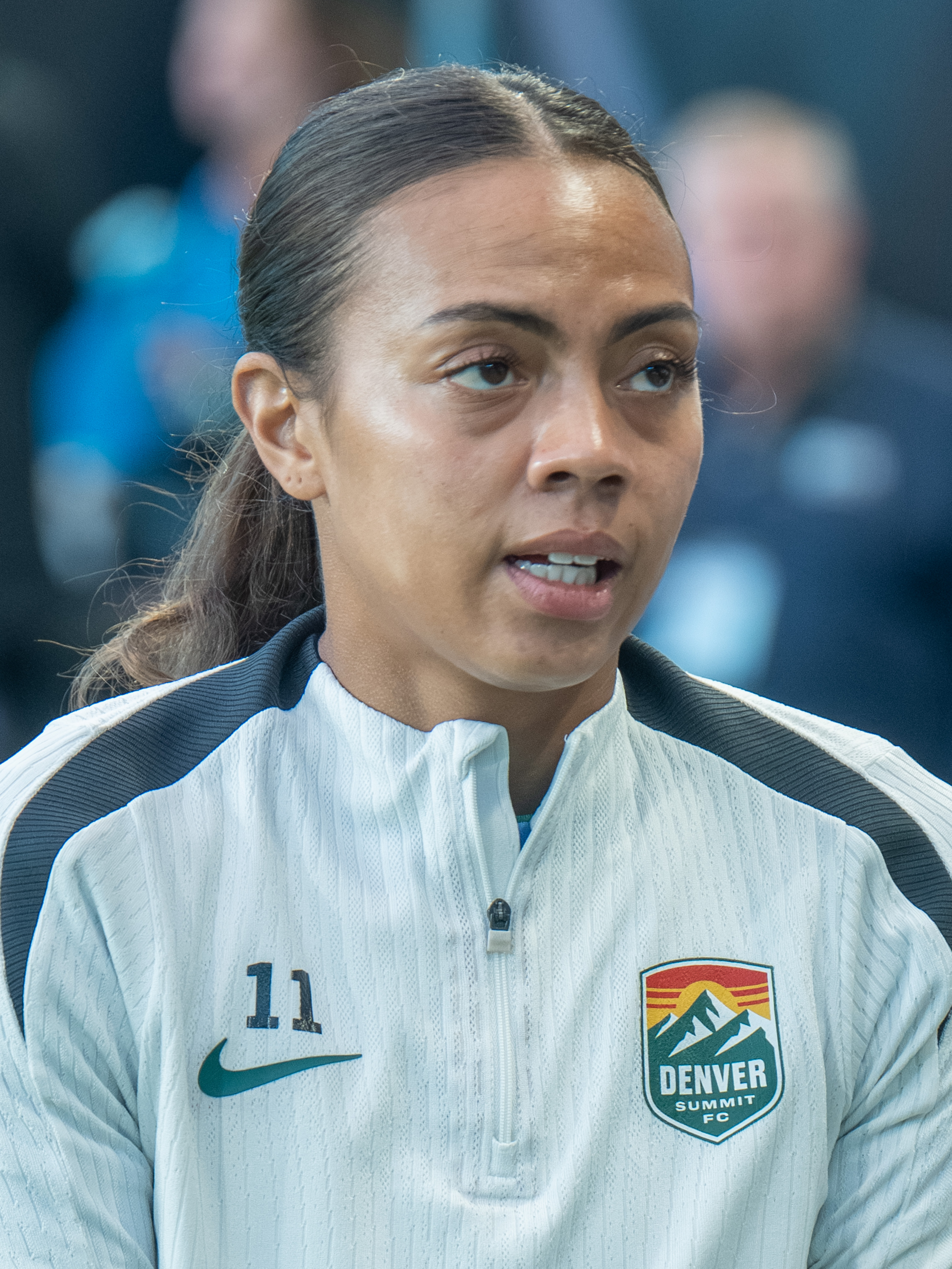
- Brazier with the Denver Summit in 2026

Personal information
- Full name: Alleandra Watt Brazier
- Birth name: Alleandra Morgan Watt
- Date of birth: March 12, 1997 (age 29)
- Place of birth: Colorado Springs, Colorado, United States
- Height: 5 ft 8 in (1.73 m)
- Position: Forward

Team information
- Current team: Denver Summit
- Number: 11

Youth career
- Colorado Pride

College career
Years	Team	Apps	(Gls)
2015–2019	Texas A&M Aggies	90	(49)

Senior career*
Years	Team	Apps	(Gls)
2020	Melbourne City	3	(3)
2020	North Carolina Courage	0	(0)
2021–2022	OL Reign	18	(0)
2022–2025	Orlando Pride	62	(6)
2026–	Denver Summit	18	(1)
2025	→ Orlando Pride (loan)	9	(1)

International career
2016–2017	United States U20	5	(2)
2016–2019	United States U23	3	(0)
- * Club domestic league appearances and goals as of 06:35, November 8, 2026 (UTC)

Alleandra Morgan Brazier (née Watt; born March 12, 1997) is an American professional soccer player who plays as a forward for Denver Summit FC of the National Women's Soccer League (NWSL). She played college soccer for the Texas A&M Aggies, twice earning first-team All-American honors, and was selected sixth overall by the North Carolina Courage in the 2020 NWSL College Draft.

After starting her professional career with Melbourne City, Brazier had a spell with the Courage before she was traded to OL Reign. In 2022, she was traded to the Orlando Pride, going on to help the club win the NWSL Shield and NWSL Championship in 2024. She represented the United States on the under-20 and under-23 teams, appearing at the 2016 FIFA U-20 Women's World Cup.

== Early life ==
Born and raised in Colorado Springs, Colorado, Brazier attended Pine Creek High School where she was a four-year varsity track and field athlete and won state titles in the 100 Meter and 200 Meter in 2012 and 2014. She won back-to-back state titles in 2013 and 2014 in the 4x100 Meter and 4x200 Meter. She was named Most Valuable Player (MVP) at the 2014 Kansas Relays. Brazier played for the regional and state Olympic Development Program (ODP) teams. She was twice named Most Valuable Player at the Colorado State Cup. She played club soccer for Pride Soccer Club Predators 97 under Coach Sian Hudson.

== College career ==
Brazier attended Texas A&M University, where she played collegiate soccer for the Texas A&M Aggies. While at A&M she was appointed captain of the team, and was the first Aggie to be selected for the United Soccer Coaches All-America First Team twice. In her four years with the Aggies, Brazier competed in 90 matches, notched over 110 career points with 49 goals, including 19 game-winning goals, and 12 assists. During her senior season, Brazier earned All-American First Team and SEC Forward of the Year honors. She scored 16 goals with provided 11 assists to lead the team to a 14–5–3 record and reach the second round of the NCAA Division I tournament. As a junior, she earned All-America and All-SEC honors and led the team in points (33) and goals (15). As a sophomore, Brazier led the team in points (24) and goals (11). She earned SEC All-Tournament honors after scoring four goals against Missouri in the SEC Tournament quarterfinal the same year.

== Club career ==
=== Melbourne City and North Carolina Courage ===
On January 16, 2020, Brazier was selected 6th overall by the North Carolina Courage in the 2020 NWSL College Draft. She was not initially signed to the team and on January 30, 2020, she signed for Melbourne City in Australia for the remainder of the 2019–20 W-League season which ran congruently with the NWSL offseason. She made her professional debut as a substitute on February 16, 2020, in a 4–0 win away at Melbourne Victory. She scored her first goal for the club in the following matchweek against Western Sydney Wanderers. Brazier appeared in all five games to conclude the season. This included the grand final victory on 21 March, held behind closed doors due to the COVID-19 pandemic. Brazier described the match as "a little different" but "historical" before rushing to catch a flight back to America after the match due to the uncertainty of international travel.

On June 19, 2020, Brazier signed a two-year contract with North Carolina Courage ahead of the 2020 NWSL Challenge Cup. She made her debut for the North Carolina Courage on June 27 in the Challenge Cup but was injured in the 13th minute, suffering an ACL tear that ruled her out for the remainder of 2020 season.

=== OL Reign ===
Brazier was traded to OL Reign at the end of the 2020 season and made five appearances for the club during the 2021 season. She made her debut for the club during a 3–2 win against Chicago Red Stars on October 10, 2021, which secured a berth to the NWSL Playoffs for the Reign. OL Reign were ultimately eliminated in the Playoffs by eventual champion Washington Spirit.

During the 2022 season, Brazier was a starting forward in 3 the 14 games she played. On July 1, her pass to Jess Fishlock who served the throughball assist to Bethany Balcer helped lift the Reign to a 2–0 win over North Carolina Courage.

=== Orlando Pride ===
On August 15, 2022, Brazier was traded to Orlando Pride in exchange for $125,000 in allocation money.

On July 17, 2024, she extended her contract through 2025 with an option for 2026. She helped the Pride win the NWSL Shield with the best record in the league. In the playoff quarterfinals, she provided two assists in the first half as the Pride won 4–1 against the Chicago Red Stars. In the semifinals, she again had an assist to help win 3–2 against the Kansas City Current. She started in the 2024 NWSL Championship against the Washington Spirit, which the Pride won 1–0 on a goal from Barbra Banda.

=== Denver Summit FC ===
On August 19, 2025, Brazier signed with NWSL expansion team Denver Summit FC, which plans to begin play in 2026. A Colorado native, Brazier was the team's first player signed. She was immediately loaned back to the Orlando Pride for the remainder of the 2025 season.

== International career ==
Brazier has played internationally for the United States women's national under-20 soccer team including at the 2016 FIFA U-20 Women's World Cup in Papua New Guinea where she scored two goals. In March 2015, she scored a brace against Sweden at the La Manga Tournament lifting the team to a 2–0 win. In November 2017 and May 2018, she was called up to training camps for the United States women's national under-23 soccer team. In March 2019, she was named to the U-23 team roster for the 2019 Thorns Spring Invitational, a pre-NWSL season tournament hosted by the Portland Thorns FC.

== Personal life ==
She has been in a relationship with Donavan Brazier since 2017. The two married on December 19, 2025. She is of Filipina, Black and White heritage.

In 2024, Brazier appeared in the first season of The Offseason, a reality television series following a group of NWSL players training before the new season.

== Career statistics ==
=== Club summary ===
As of March 14, 2025.

Club	Season	League			Cup (Note: Includes NWSL Challenge Cup)		Playoffs (Note: Includes W-League Finals series and NWSL playoffs)		Other		Total	
Club	Season	Division	Apps	Goals	Apps	Goals	Apps	Goals	Apps	Goals	Apps	Goals
Melbourne City	2019–20	W-League	3	3	—		2	0	—		5	3
North Carolina Courage	2020	NWSL	—		1	0	—		—		1	0
OL Reign	2021	NWSL	4	0	0	0	1	0	—		5	0
OL Reign	2022	NWSL	14	0	7	1	—		—		21	1
OL Reign	Total		18	0	8	1	1	0	0	0	27	1
Orlando Pride	2022	NWSL	6	1	0	0	—		—		6	1
Orlando Pride	2023	NWSL	19	1	6	2	—		—		25	3
Orlando Pride	2024	NWSL	22	3	—		3	0	3 (Note: Includes the 2024 NWSL x Liga MX Femenil Summer Cup)	0	28	3
Orlando Pride	2025	NWSL	1	1	1	0	—		—		2	1
Orlando Pride	Total		48	6	7	2	3	0	3	0	61	8
Career total			69	9	15	3	6	0	3	0	93	12

== Honors ==
Texas A&M Aggies

- SEC Women's Soccer Tournament: 2017

Melbourne City

- W-League Premiership: 2019–20
- W-League Championship: 2019–20

Orlando Pride

- NWSL Shield: 2024
- NWSL Championship: 2024
