= Phallon Tullis-Joyce =

American soccer player (born 1996)

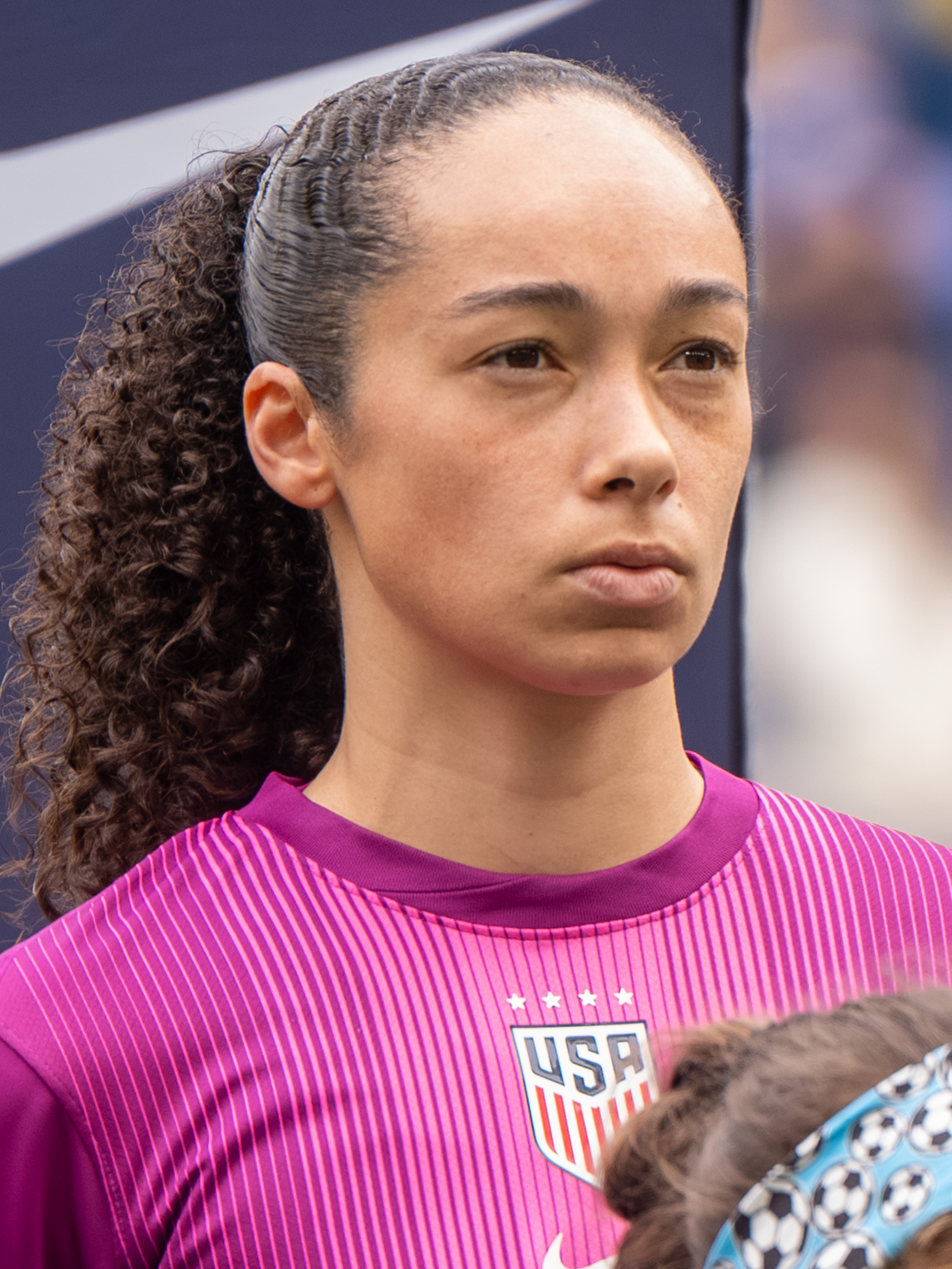
- Tullis-Joyce with the United States in 2026

Personal information
- Full name: Phallon Abaigeal Tullis-Joyce
- Date of birth: October 19, 1996 (age 30)
- Place of birth: New York City, United States
- Height: 6 ft 0 in (1.83 m)
- Position: Goalkeeper

Team information
- Current team: Manchester United
- Number: 91

College career
Years	Team	Apps	(Gls)
2014–2018	Miami Hurricanes	62	(0)

Senior career*
Years	Team	Apps	(Gls)
2019–2021	Reims	41	(0)
2021–2023	OL Reign	39	(0)
2023–	Manchester United	54	(0)

International career^{‡}
2025–	United States	8	(0)
- * Club domestic league appearances and goals as of November 22, 2026 ‡ National team caps and goals as of October 13, 2026

Phallon Abaigeal Tullis-Joyce (/ˈæbɪɡeɪl/; born October 19, 1996) is an American professional soccer player who plays as a goalkeeper for English Women's Super League club Manchester United and the United States national team. She played college soccer for the Miami Hurricanes before starting her professional career with French Division 1 Féminine club Reims and the OL Reign of the National Women's Soccer League (NWSL).

== Early life ==
Born and raised on Long Island, New York, Tullis-Joyce attended Longwood High School where she was a five year varsity player and most valuable player (MVP). A multiple-award winner, Tullis-Joyce was named all-league, all-conference and all-county her last three seasons and Named League 1 Player of the Year in 2012. She was also named to the state team in 2012-13.

Tullis-Joyce played club soccer for Match Fit Colchesters and helped lead the team to the US Youth National League Championship in 2013. She previously played for the Farmingdale United and WPSL FC Westchester Elite. She played for the Eastern New York Olympic Development Program (ODP) as well as the regional ODP team.

== College career ==
Tullis-Joyce attended the University of Miami where she played collegiate soccer for Miami Hurricanes. As a redshirt freshman, she started in goal nine times, made 24 saves, and conceded 13 goals with one or fewer allowed in five of the matches she played. She ranked ninth in the Atlantic Coast Conference (ACC) in shutouts per game (0.22). During her sophomore season with the team, Tullis-Joyce was the starting goalkeeper and was named to the All-ACC Academic Team. She earned NSCAA College Player of the Week ACC Defensive Player of the Week honors in September 2016.

== Club career ==
=== Reims ===
Tullis-Joyce declared for the 2019 NWSL College Draft but was not selected. On January 19, 2019, Tullis-Joyce signed with French Division 2 club Stade de Reims. She made her debut on April 14, 2019 in a 4–0 league win against Brest. The team was promoted as champions at the end of the season. During the 2019–20 season, she was the starting goalkeeper in 16 matches. Reims finished the regular season in eighth place with a 4–9–3 record. During the 2020–21 season, she started in all 22 league matches. Reims finished the season in sixth place with a 9–10–3 record.

=== OL Reign ===
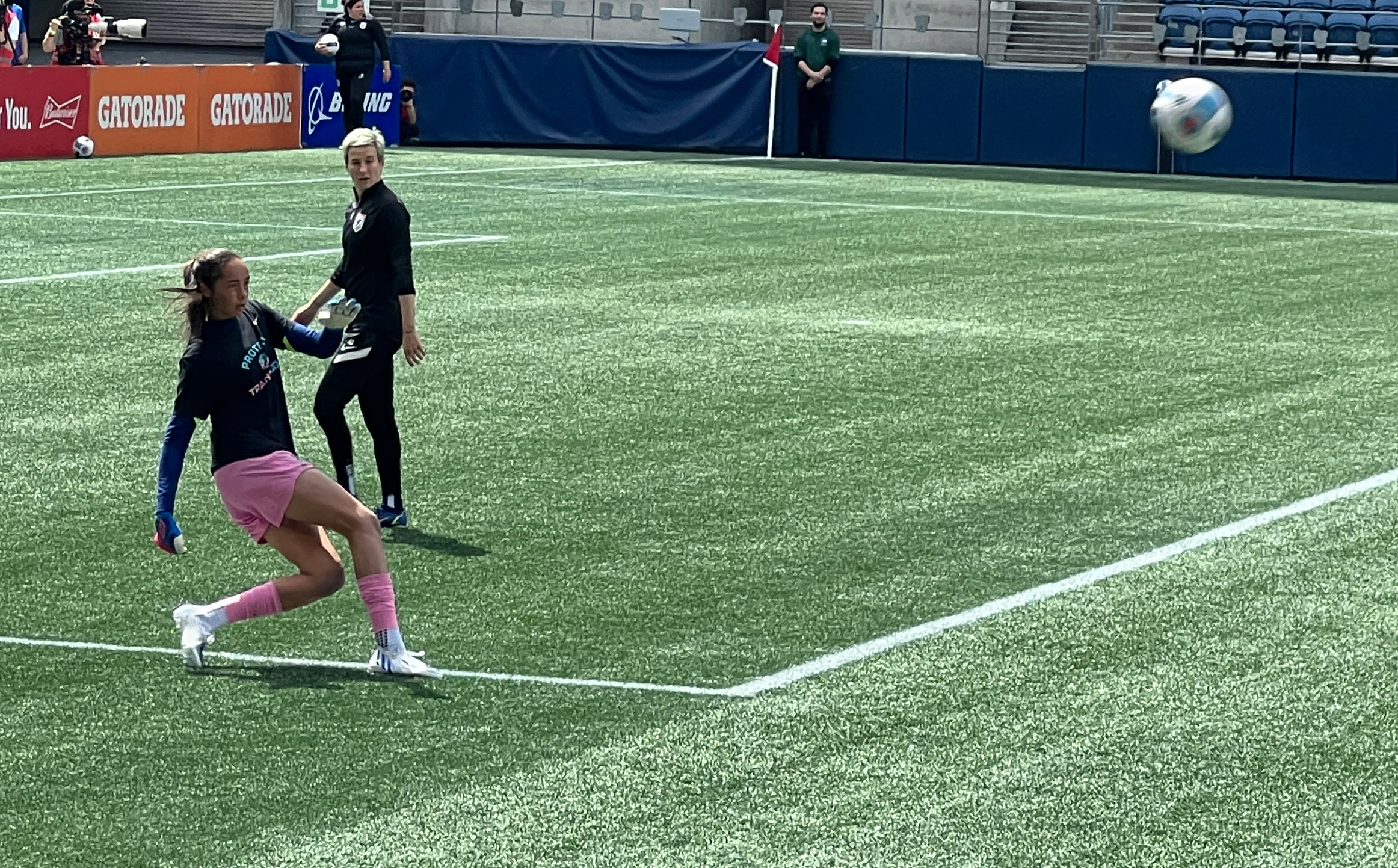
Tullis-Joyce kicks a ball while teammate Megan Rapinoe looks on during warm-ups before a match, May 2022

On April 8, 2021, Tullis-Joyce signed a one-and-a-half-year contract with American NWSL club OL Reign. During the 2021 season, she was a backup goalkeeper for on-loan French international Sarah Bouhaddi and made one appearance during the season. The Reign finished in second place during the regular season with a 13–8–3 record. After advancing to the NWSL Playoffs, they were eliminated by eventual champions Washington Spirit.

Following the departure of Bouhaddi, Tullis-Joyce was the starting goalkeeper during the 2022 season, starting all 30 matches. She won five save of the week honors, was named to the NWSL Team of the Month for May and earned Challenge Cup Team of the Tournament honors. She was also nominated for NWSL Goalkeeper of the Year. In July 2022, she signed a contract extension through the 2024 season with the Reign.

=== Manchester United ===
On September 14, 2023, Tullis-Joyce signed for Manchester United. The club reportedly paid a transfer fee of $160,000, a record fee for a female goalkeeper. She made her debut on November 9, 2023, keeping a clean sheet in a 7–0 win over Everton in the 2023–24 FA Women's League Cup group stage. Tullis-Joyce started all four group stage games, her only appearances of the season as backup behind Mary Earps, as she kept two clean sheets and conceded three goals. Manchester United finished as runners-up in the group but did not qualify for the knockout stage.

Following the departure of Earps in summer 2024, Tullis-Joyce inherited the starting keeper role. She made her WSL debut on September 21, starting and keeping a clean sheet in an opening day 3–0 win at Old Trafford. On April 25, 2025, she extended her contract with the club until June 2028. Tullis-Joyce kept 13 clean sheets during the 2024–25 WSL season, sharing the Golden Glove award with Chelsea's Hannah Hampton.

== International career ==
In June 2022, Tullis-Joyce was included in United States national team's 59-player provisional squad for the 2022 CONCACAF W Championship. On November 18, 2024, she received her first official senior call-up for the friendly matches against England and the Netherlands. Tullis-Joyce made her senior international debut on April 5, 2025, keeping a clean sheet in a 2–0 friendly win against Brazil.

== Personal life ==
Tullis-Joyce majored in marine biology. She is a certified AOW and AAUS scientific diver.

== Career statistics ==
=== Club ===
As of November 22, 2026

Appearances and goals by club, season and competition
Club	Season	League			National cup (Note: Includes the Women's FA Cup)		League cup (Note: Includes the NWSL Challenge Cup and the FA Women's League Cup)		Continental		Other		Total	
Club	Season	Division	Apps	Goals	Apps	Goals	Apps	Goals	Apps	Goals	Apps	Goals	Apps	Goals
Reims	2018–19	D2F	3	0	0	0	—		—		—		3	0
Reims	2019–20	D1F	16	0	0	0	—		—		—		16	0
Reims	2020–21	D1F	22	0	0	0	—		—		—		22	0
Reims	Total		41	0	0	0	0	0	0	0	0	0	41	0
OL Reign	2021	NWSL	1	0	—		0	0	—		0	0	1	0
OL Reign	2022	NWSL	22	0	—		7	0	—		1 (Note: Appearance in the NWSL playoffs)	0	30	0
OL Reign	2023	NWSL	16	0	—		0	0	—		—		16	0
OL Reign	Total		39	0	0	0	7	0	0	0	1	0	47	0
Manchester United	2023–24	WSL	0	0	0	0	4	0	0	0	—		4	0
Manchester United	2024–25	WSL	22	0	5	0	3	0	—		—		30	0
Manchester United	2025–26	WSL	21	0	2	0	3	0	12	0	—		38	0
Manchester United	2026–27	WSL	11	0	0	0	0	0	—		—		11	0
Manchester United	Total		54	0	7	0	10	0	12	0	0	0	83	0
Career total			134	0	7	0	17	0	12	0	1	0	171	0

=== International ===
As of match played October 13, 2026

Appearances and goals by national team and year
National team	Year	Apps	Goals
United States	2025	4	0
United States	2026	4	0
Total		8	0

== Honors ==
United States

- SheBelieves Cup: 2026

Reims

- Division 2 Féminine: 2018–19

OL Reign

- NWSL Shield: 2022

Manchester United

- Women's FA Cup: 2023–24; runner-up: 2024–25
- Women's League Cup runner-up: 2025–26

Individual

- NWSL Team of the Month: May 2022
- NWSL Challenge Cup All-Tournament Team: 2022
- Manchester United Women's Players' Player of the Year: 2024–25
- PFA WSL Team of the Year: 2024–25
- Barclays WSL Team of the Season: May 2025
- Barclays WSL Golden Glove: 2024–25
