= Alana Cook =

American soccer player (born 1997)

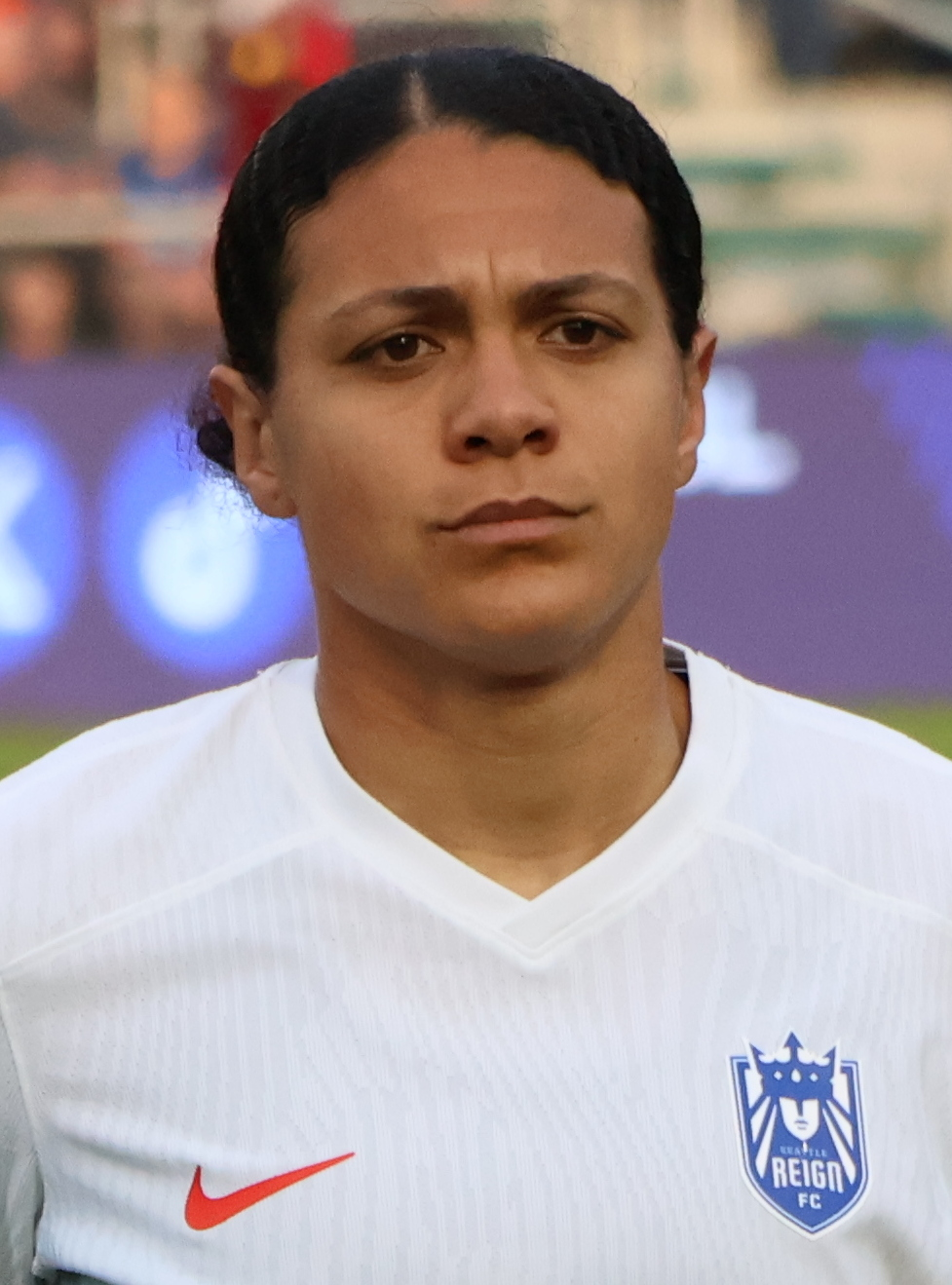
- Cook with the Seattle Reign in 2024

Personal information
- Full name: Alana Simone Cook
- Date of birth: April 11, 1997 (age 29)
- Place of birth: Worcester, Massachusetts, U.S.
- Height: 5 ft 9 in (1.75 m)
- Position: Center back

Team information
- Current team: Kansas City Current
- Number: 15

Youth career
- The Pennington School
- Match Fit Academy Colchesters

College career
Years	Team	Apps	(Gls)
2015–2018	Stanford Cardinal	93	(5)

Senior career*
Years	Team	Apps	(Gls)
2019–2021	Paris Saint-Germain	21	(0)
2020	→ OL Reign (loan)	0	(0)
2021–2024	Seattle Reign (Note: The club was known as OL Reign from 2020 to 2023. In January 2024, it returned to its original name, Seattle Reign, due to the OL Groupe looking to sell the club.)	67	(0)
2024–	Kansas City Current	17	(0)

International career^{‡}
2013	United States U17		
2014–2016	United States U20		
2017–2019	United States U23	3	(0)
2019–	United States	30	(1)
Medal record
Women's football
Representing United States
CONCACAF W Championship
Winner	2022 Mexico
- * Club domestic league appearances and goals as of October 19, 2025 ‡ National team caps and goals as of April 8, 2025

Alana Simone Cook (born April 11, 1997) is an American professional soccer player who plays as a center back for the Kansas City Current of the National Women's Soccer League and the United States national team.

After playing collegiately for the Stanford Cardinal, Cook signed with French club Paris Saint-Germain. She signed with Seattle Reign FC in 2021.

Cook debuted for the United States national team in 2019. She was selected in the squad for the 2023 FIFA Women's World Cup.

== Early life ==
Cook was born in Worcester, Massachusetts to parents Florence and Bryan Cook and raised with sister Brianna in Worcester and Far Hills, New Jersey. She attended The Pennington School, a boarding school in Pennington, New Jersey, and helped guide the varsity soccer team to regional and state titles. Cook was named 2013 New Jersey Prep Player of the Year and 2015 NSCAA High School Scholar Player of the Year.

Twice named NSCAA Youth All-American, Cook played in the NSCAA High School All-America Game and earned Best XI honors. She played club soccer for Match Fit Academy Colchesters and won the 2013 U.S. Youth Soccer National League title with the team.

Cook began representing the United States on its youth national teams as a teenager.

=== Stanford Cardinal ===
Cook attended the Stanford University from 2015 to 2018 where she earned a degree in symbolic systems and was a four-year starter for the Stanford Cardinal women's soccer team. She captained the team in her final two seasons. She was named Pac-12 Conference Defender of the Year and a MAC Hermann Trophy semifinalist in 2018.

== Club career ==
=== Paris Saint-Germain, 2019–21 ===
In January 2019, Cook elected to forgo the 2019 NWSL College Draft despite her first round draft grade and instead chose to pursue opportunities in Europe, signing a three-year deal with French Division 1 Féminine team Paris Saint-Germain.

==== OL Reign (loan), 2020 ====
On June 16, 2020, Cook joined OL Reign on a short-term loan for the 2020 NWSL Challenge Cup.

=== OL / Seattle Reign, 2021–2024 ===
On June 7, 2021, OL Reign signed Cook to a three-year contract with an option for an extra year on a permanent transfer from PSG.

During the 2021 season, Cook was a starting defender in all 20 matches of the regular season. The Reign finished in second place during the regular season with a 13–8–3 record. After advancing to the NWSL Playoffs, they were eliminated by eventual champions Washington Spirit. Cook was named to the league's Best XI.

In 2022, Cook helped OL Reign finish in first place during the regular season winning the NWSL Shield. She was nominated for NWSL Defender of the Year for the 2021 and 2022 seasons.

=== Kansas City Current, 2024– ===
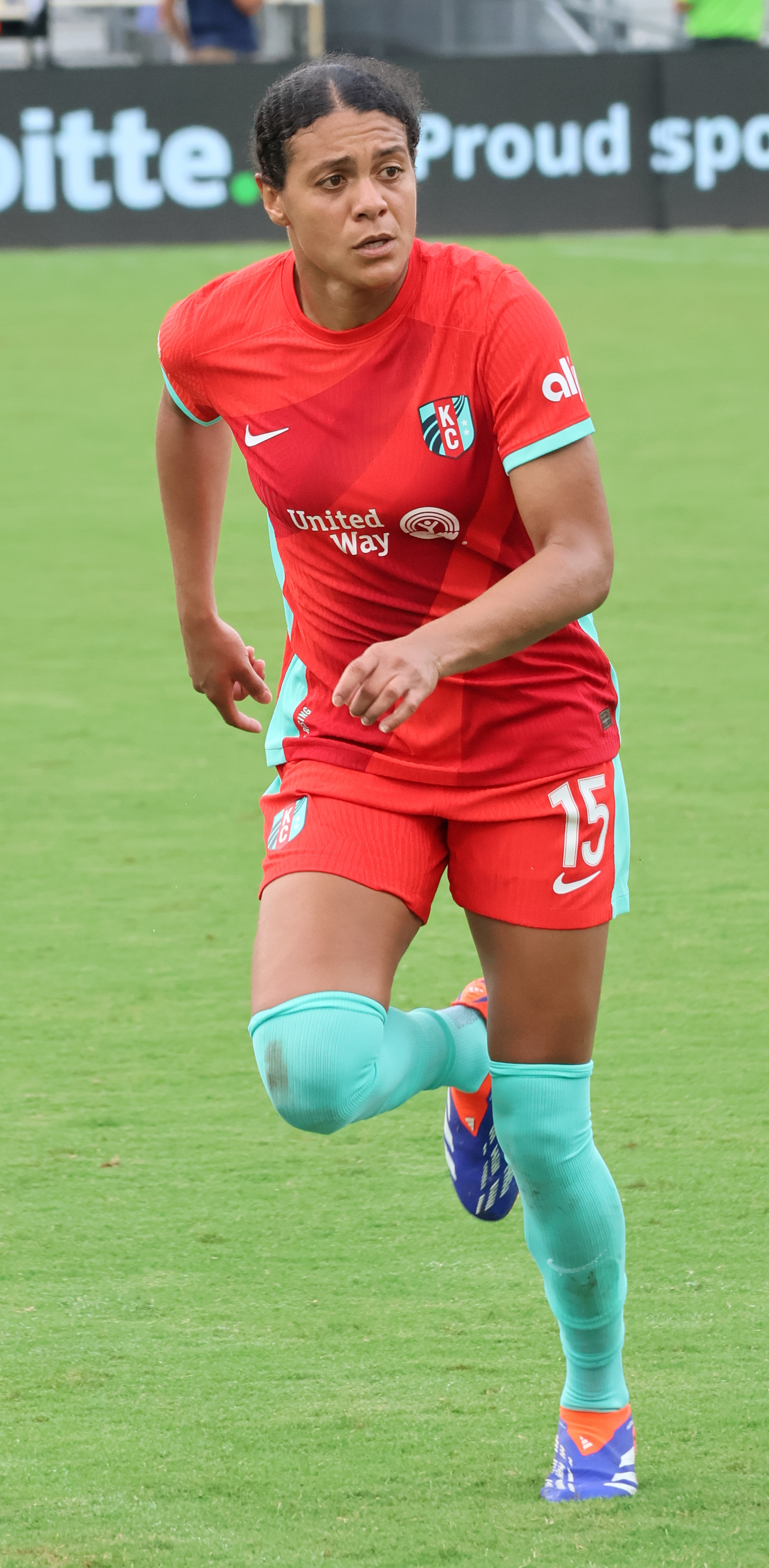
Cook playing for the Current in 2024

On July 22, 2024, Seattle Reign announced that they had traded Cook to Kansas City Current for allocation money and intra-league transfer funds.

== International career ==
Cook has competed for the United States under-17, under-20, under-23, and senior national teams. She captained the under-17 team and made the jump to the under-20 team in 2014 followed by the under-23 team in 2017. She captained the under-23 squad in 2019. She is eligible to represent England because of her British father and earned her first senior international call-up in September 2019 as a training player for England's friendlies against Portugal and Brazil.

Cook received her first call-up to the United States national team on October 31, 2019. In June 2023, she was named to the U.S. squad for the 2023 FIFA Women's World Cup in Australia and New Zealand.

== Personal life ==
Cook eats a plant based diet.

== Career statistics ==
=== Club ===
As of October 19, 2025

Appearances and goals by club, season and competition
Club	Season	League			Cup (Note: Includes Coupe de France and NWSL Challenge Cup.)		Playoffs (Note: Includes NWSL playoffs.)		Continental		Other		Total	
Club	Season	Division	Apps	Goals	Apps	Goals	Apps	Goals	Apps	Goals	Apps	Goals	Apps	Goals
Paris Saint-Germain	2018–19	Division 1 Féminine	3	0	0	0	—		1	0	—		4	0
Paris Saint-Germain	2019–20	Division 1 Féminine	5	0	2	0	—		4	0	0 (Note: Appearances in the Trophée des Championnes.)	0	11	0
Paris Saint-Germain	2020–21	Division 1 Féminine	13	0	0	0	—		4	1	0	0	17	1
Paris Saint-Germain	Total		21	0	2	0	0	0	9	1	0	0	32	1
OL Reign (loan)	2020	NWSL	— (Note: The 2020 NWSL regular season and playoffs were canceled due to the COVID-19 pandemic.)		3	0	—		—		—		3	0
Seattle Reign FC	2021	NWSL	19	0	—		1	0	—		—		20	0
Seattle Reign FC	2022	NWSL	19	0	7	1	1	0	—		—		27	1
Seattle Reign FC	2023	NWSL	18	0	2	0	3	0	—		—		23	0
Seattle Reign FC	2024	NWSL	11	0	—		—		—		0 (Note: Appearances in the NWSL x Liga MX Femenil Summer Cup.)	0	11	0
Seattle Reign FC	Total		67	0	9	1	5	0	0	0	0	0	81	1
Kansas City Current	2024	NWSL	10	0	—		2	0	—		1	0	13	0
Kansas City Current	2025	NWSL	7	0	—		0	0	—		—		7	0
Kansas City Current	Total		17	0	0	0	2	0	0	0	1	0	20	0
Career total			105	0	14	1	7	0	9	1	1	0	136	2

=== International ===
As of match played April 8, 2025

Appearances and goals by national team and year
National team	Year	Apps	Goals
United States	2019	1	0
United States	2020	0	0
United States	2021	3	0
United States	2022	15	0
United States	2023	10	1
United States	2024	0	0
United States	2025	1	0
Total		30	1

Scores and results list United States's goal tally first, score column indicates score after each Cook goal.

List of international goals scored by Alana Cook
No.	Date	Venue	Opponent	Score	Result	Competition	Ref.
1	April 11, 2023	St. Louis, Missouri	Republic of Ireland	1–0	1–0	Friendly	

== Honors ==
Stanford Cardinal

- NCAA Women's College Cup: 2017

Paris Saint-Germain

- Division 1 Féminine: 2020–21

OL Reign

- NWSL Shield: 2022
- The Women's Cup: 2022

Kansas City Current

- NWSL Championship: 2026
- NWSL Shield: 2025
- NWSL x Liga MX Femenil Summer Cup: 2024

United States U23

- Nordic Tournament: 2019

United States

- CONCACAF Women's Championship: 2022
- SheBelieves Cup: 2022, 2023

Individual

- Pac-12 Conference Defender of the Year: 2018
- MAC Hermann Trophy Semifinalist: 2018
- NWSL Best XI: 2021,2022
