= Bethany Bos =

American soccer player (born 1997)

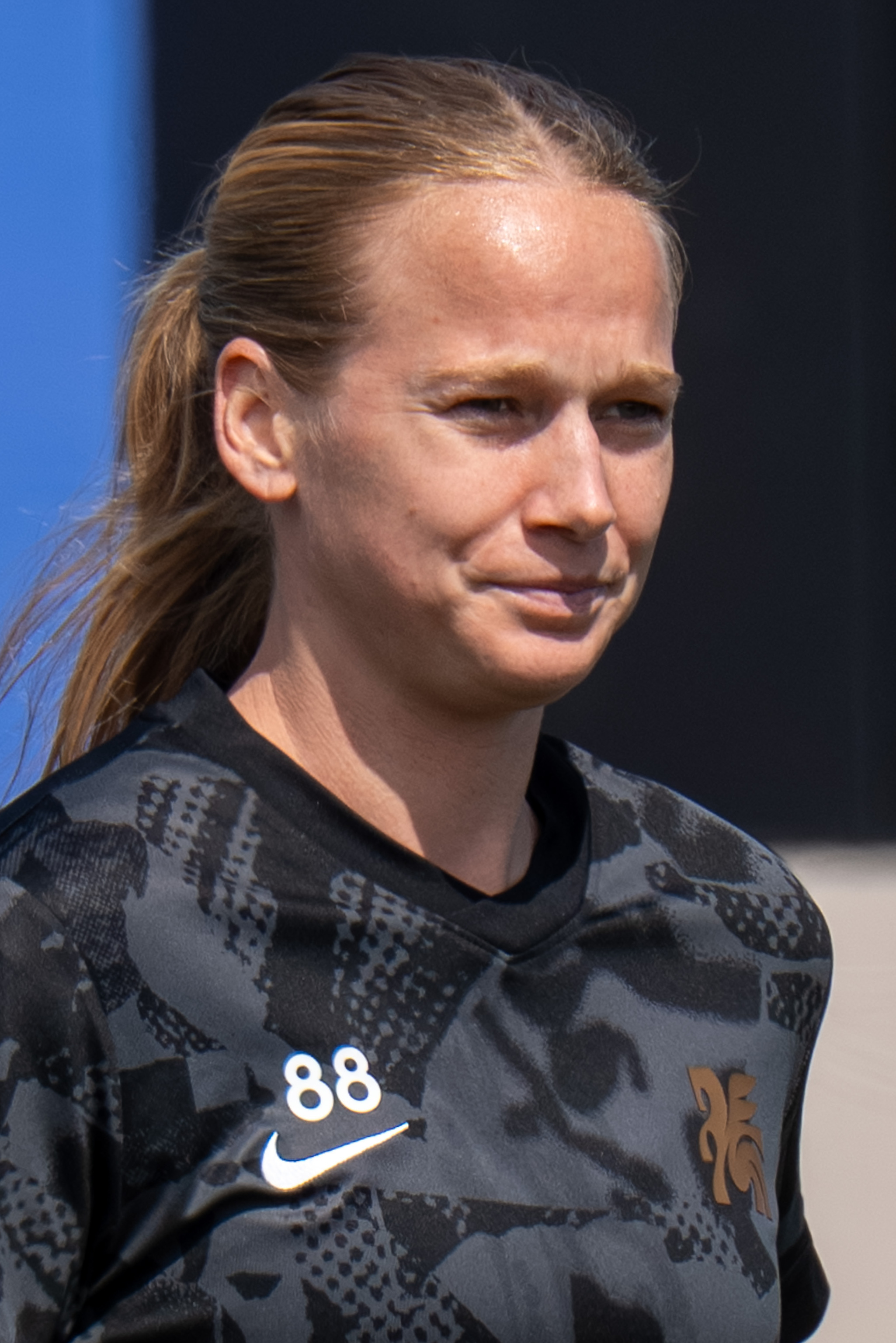
- Bos with the Dallas Trinity in 2026

Personal information
- Birth name: Bethany Catherine Balcer
- Date of birth: March 7, 1997 (age 29)
- Place of birth: Hudsonville, Michigan, United States
- Height: 5 ft 9 in (1.75 m)
- Position: Striker

Youth career
- Michigan Fire Juniors

College career
| Years | Team | Apps | (Gls) |
| 2015–2018 | Spring Arbor Cougars | 98 | (129) |

Senior career*
| Years | Team | Apps | (Gls) |
| 2017 | Grand Rapids FC | 12 | (19) |
| 2018 | Seattle Sounders Women | | |
| 2019–2024 | Seattle Reign | 103 | (33) |
| 2024–2025 | Racing Louisville | 21 | (4) |
| 2026 | Dallas Trinity | 14 | (3) |

International career^{‡}
| 2019 | United States U23 | 2 | |
| 2021 | United States | 1 | (0) |
- * Club domestic league appearances and goals as of May 26, 2026 ‡ National team caps and goals as of November 26, 2021

Bethany Catherine Bos (née Balcer; born March 7, 1997) is an American professional soccer player who plays as a striker. Bos played college soccer for the Spring Arbor Cougars, where she was a two-time NAIA national champion, three-time NAIA national player of the year, four-time first-team All-American, and the school's leading scorer.

After going undrafted, Bos signed with the Seattle Reign, becoming the first NAIA player in the NWSL, and was named the NWSL Rookie of the Year in 2019. She spent five-and-a-half seasons with the Reign, winning the NWSL Shield in 2022, earning two NWSL Second XI selections, and becoming the club's third all-time top scorer. She was traded to Racing Louisville in mid-2024. Bos signed with USL Super League club Dallas Trinity FC in 2026.

Bos earned one cap with the United States national team in 2021.

== Early life ==
Bos grew up in Hudsonville, Michigan and attended Unity Christian High School, where she played varsity soccer and basketball. She is the fourth of five children.

== College career ==
Bos attended Spring Arbor University from 2015 to 2019, where she was a four-year starter on its varsity soccer team. The Cougars advanced to the NAIA Final Four every year and won two national titles with Bos on the team. She was named the NAIA national player of the year three times and first-team All-American all four years.

While in college, Bos played as an amateur with senior teams over the summer. She led Grand Rapids FC to a United Women's Soccer championship in 2017 – scoring hat-tricks in five straight matches – and played with Seattle Sounders Women in the Women's Premier Soccer League the following year winning the WPSL championship.

== Club career ==
=== Seattle Reign ===
Bos was invited to the Reign FC preseason training camp prior to the 2019 NWSL season and subsequently earned a contract on the club's supplemental roster. She was the first NAIA player to sign with an NWSL club and only the third NWSL player to previously play collegiately in the United States and finish their collegiate career with a non-NCAA D-I institution. Bos made her NWSL debut coming on as an 86th-minute substitute at the Houston Dash on April 14, 2019. A week later, she made her first start in Reign's home-opener at Cheney Stadium. Curling a shot from the edge of the penalty area into the far corner of the goal, she scored her first-ever pro goal in the 21st minute against Orlando Pride in a 1–1 tie. It was also the first home goal scored in the Reign's first season in Tacoma, Washington. She scored her second goal in her second home start, sixth appearance on May 27, 2019, in a 2–1 win against the defending champions North Carolina Courage. Her 13th-minute header from the edge of the box crashed off the underside of the bar to give her side an early lead. Her third goal occurred in the next game in her third home start against the Houston Dash. On a breakaway she picked up a deflected through ball from Darian Jenkins and slotted right-footed past the keeper for the first goal of the game in the 32nd minute, Houston tied in the 90th to split the points. At the end of the season, she was awarded the 2019 Rookie of the Year Award.

Bos established herself as one of the Reign's leading players and was the club's top scorer every season she spent there. She helped lead the Reign to top of the standings for the 2022 season, winning the NWSL Shield. She scored 33 regular-season goals during her tenure with the Reign, the third-highest total in the NWSL from 2019 to mid-2024. Upon her departure, she was the Reign's third-highest scorer in club history.

=== Racing Louisville ===
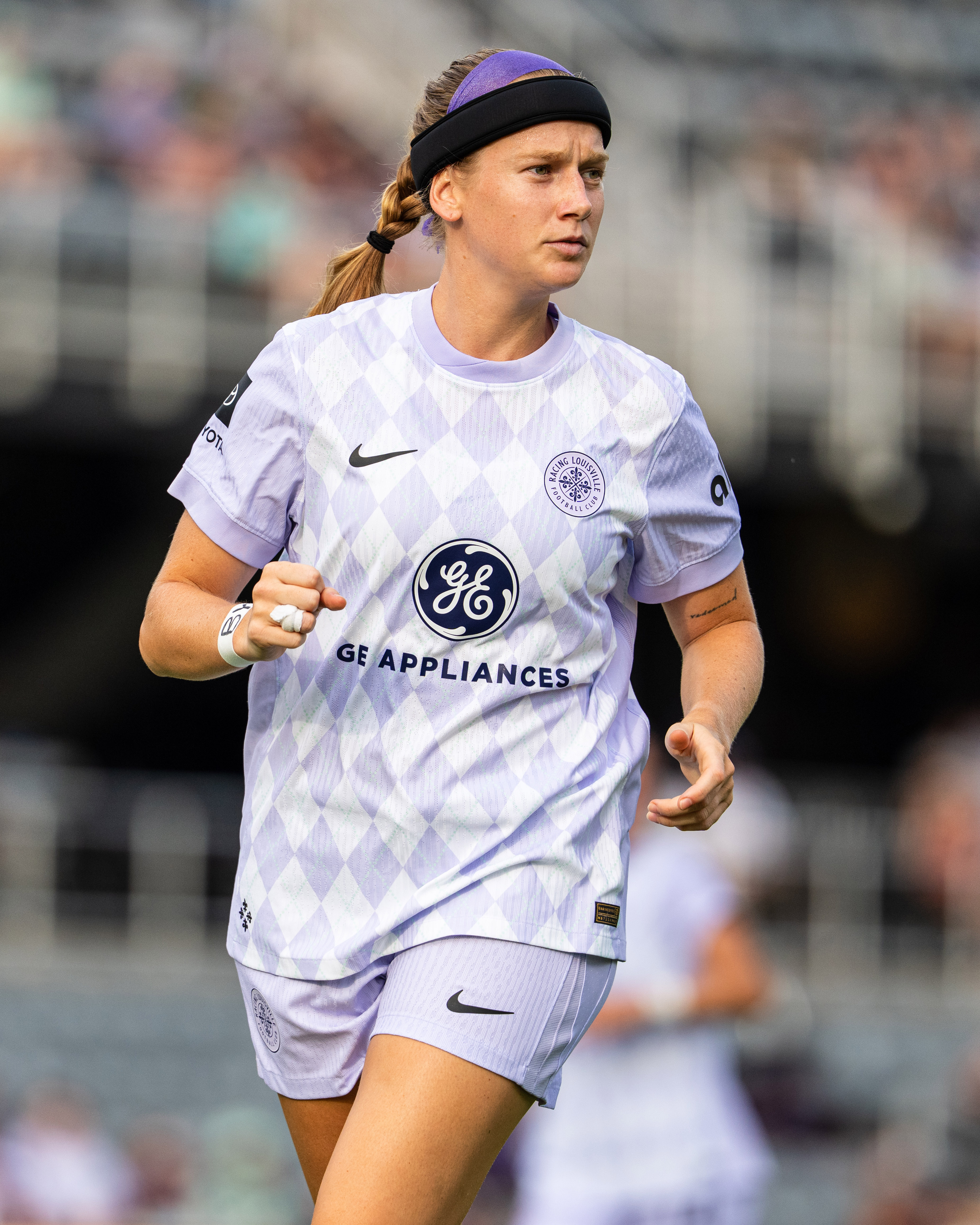
Bos with Racing Louisville in 2025

On August 19, 2024, Bos was traded to Racing Louisville FC in exchange for Jaelin Howell and $50,000 in allocation money. She made her Louisville debut five days later, starting in a match against the Chicago Red Stars. She scored her first goal with the club in a comeback victory against Angel City FC on September 14, 2024.

Bos announced that she would be taking a mental health leave away from the sport in March 2025. After returning to the pitch in August, Bos scored one goal before becoming a free agent at the end of the 2025 season. On November 26, 2025, Racing Louisville announced that Bos would not be re-signing with the team.

=== Dallas Trinity ===
On February 3, 2026, USL Super League club Dallas Trinity FC announced that they had signed Bos midway through the 2025–26 season. Bos made her Super League debut four days later, coming on as a second-half substitute for Camryn Lancaster in a 4–0 victory over Fort Lauderdale United FC. She went on to appear in every match for Dallas across the rest of the season, scoring three goals and helping the Trinity qualify for the playoffs for the second consecutive campaign. On June 4, 2026, the club announced that Bos would be departing from Dallas at the end of the season.

== International career ==
Bos received her first call-up to the United States women's national soccer team in December 2019. She made her international debut on November 26, 2021, against Australia. She was previously a member of the United States women's national under-23 soccer team.

== Style of play ==
Bos plays as a striker. She is known for her scoring ability off headers.

== Personal life ==
Bos is a Christian. Her brother Nicholas is a soccer referee who has worked for PRO and the NCAA. and MLS. Her sister Shannon is the head woman's soccer coach at Spring Arbor University. She married Christian Bos on January 3, 2026 and subsequently began using her married name.

== Career statistics ==
=== Club ===
As of May 23, 2026

| Club | Season | League | | | Cup (Note: Includes the NWSL Challenge Cup) | | Playoffs (Note: Includes NWSL Playoffs and USL playoffs) | | Other | | Total | |
| Club | Season | Division | Apps | Goals | Apps | Goals | Apps | Goals | Apps | Goals | Apps | Goals |
|---|---|---|---|---|---|---|---|---|---|---|---|---|
| Seattle Reign FC (Note: Seattle Reign FC was named Reign FC in 2019 and OL Reign from 2020–2023) | 2019 | NWSL | 24 | 6 | — | | 1 | 0 | — | | 25 | 6 |
| Seattle Reign FC | 2020 | NWSL | — | | 5 | 1 | — | | 4 (Note: Includes the NWSL Fall Series) | 2 | 9 | 3 |
| Seattle Reign FC | 2021 | NWSL | 23 | 9 | 3 | 0 | 1 | 0 | — | | 27 | 9 |
| Seattle Reign FC | 2022 | NWSL | 19 | 7 | 7 | 2 | 1 | 0 | — | | 27 | 9 |
| Seattle Reign FC | 2023 | NWSL | 22 | 6 | 4 | 1 | 3 | 0 | — | | 29 | 7 |
| Seattle Reign FC | 2024 | NWSL | 15 | 5 | — | | — | | 3 (Note: Includes the NWSL x Liga MX Femenil Summer Cup) | 0 | 18 | 5 |
| Seattle Reign FC | Total | | 103 | 33 | 19 | 4 | 6 | 0 | 7 | 2 | 135 | 39 |
| Racing Louisville FC | 2024 | NWSL | 10 | 3 | — | | — | | — | | 10 | 3 |
| Racing Louisville FC | 2025 | NWSL | 11 | 1 | — | | 1 | 0 | — | | 12 | 1 |
| Dallas Trinity FC | 2025–26 | USL | 14 | 3 | — | | 1 | 0 | — | | 15 | 3 |
| Career total | | | 138 | 40 | 19 | 4 | 8 | 0 | 7 | 2 | 172 | 46 |

=== International ===
As of match played November 26, 2021

| National Team | Year | Apps | Goals |
|---|---|---|---|
| United States | 2021 | 1 | 0 |
| Total | | 1 | 0 |

== Honors ==
OL Reign

- NWSL Shield: 2022
- The Women's Cup: 2022

Individual

- NWSL Rookie of the Year: 2019
- NWSL Players' Rookie of the Year: 2019
- NWSL Second XI: 2019
- NWSL Player of the Week: 2021: Weeks 12, 16
