= Ryanne Brown =

American soccer player (born 1999)

- Brown with the Seattle Reign in 2026

Personal information
- Full name: Ryanne Alyse Brown
- Date of birth: January 21, 1999 (age 27)
- Place of birth: Indianapolis, Indiana, U.S.
- Height: 5 ft 8 in (1.73 m)
- Position: Right back

Team information
- Current team: Seattle Reign
- Number: 22

College career
Years	Team	Apps	(Gls)
2017–2021	Wake Forest Demon Deacons	82	(8)

Senior career*
Years	Team	Apps	(Gls)
2022–	Seattle Reign	42	(1)
2022	→ Nordsjælland (loan)	10	(0)

International career
2016	United States U17		
- * Club domestic league appearances and goals as of 16:31, November 8, 2026 (UTC)

Ryanne Alyse Brown (born January 21, 1999) is an American professional soccer player who plays as a right back for Seattle Reign FC of the National Women's Soccer League (NWSL). She played college soccer for the Wake Forest Demon Deacons and was drafted by the Reign in the second round of the 2022 NWSL Draft.

== College career ==
Brown played five seasons for the Wake Forest Demon Deacons, making 57 starts in 82 appearances. As a senior, she ranked second-highest on the team in minutes played and in goals, operating as a defender, a midfielder, and a forward at various points.

== Club career ==
OL Reign drafted Brown as the 21st overall pick of the 2022 NWSL Draft. She made her NWSL debut on July 17, 2022.

On July 29, 2022, Brown signed a contract extension with the Reign and joined Danish club FC Nordsjælland on loan.

Brown suffered a torn anterior cruciate ligament (ACL) in July 2024. In September 2025, she was taken off the season-ending injury list and signed a contract extension.

Brown returned to the field in early 2026, making a substitute cameo in Seattle's season-opening match against the Orlando Pride. On July 12, 2026, she scored her first NWSL goal in her first start back from injury to help the Reign beat rivals Portland Thorns FC, 1–0. She signed a contract extension ten days later to stay with the Reign through the end of 2027.

== International career ==
Brown has been called up to the United States under-17 national team.

== Personal life ==
Brown's brother is retired professional soccer player Jalen Brown, and Philippines international Sarina Bolden is their cousin.
