= 2022 NWSL Draft =

Soccer draft

General information
- Sport: Soccer
- Date: December 18, 2021
- Time: 2:00 PM ET
- Networks: CBS Sports; Twitch

Overview
- 50 total selections in 4 rounds
- League: National Women's Soccer League
- First selection: Naomi Girma, San Diego Wave FC
- Most selections: OL Reign and Racing Louisville FC (6 picks)
- Fewest selections: Houston Dash (1 pick)

The 2022 NWSL Draft was the 10th annual meeting of National Women's Soccer League (NWSL) franchises to select eligible college players. It was held on December 18, 2021, and hosted remotely by CBS Sports.

== Format ==
- All 12 teams of the National Women's Soccer League (NWSL) take turns making their selections over four rounds, with 12 picks per round plus any additional compensatory picks. Draft order in each round was determined by the reverse order of the final 2021 regular season standings, with the exceptions being Angel City FC and San Diego Wave FC taking the first two selections as expansion teams and the two teams that contested the 2021 Championship game, Washington Spirit and Chicago Red Stars, taking the last two selections.
- After winning a coin flip, San Diego Wave FC selected priority in the NWSL Draft. As a result, San Diego received pick No. 1 in both the first and third rounds of the draft, while Angel City will select first in rounds two and four. By virtue, Angel City were given the first pick in the 2022 NWSL Expansion Draft.
- Each expansion team received a compensatory pick at the conclusion of the second round of the NWSL Draft. A coin flip determined that San Diego Wave FC would select the first compensatory pick at No. 25, and Angel City FC would make the second pick at No. 26.
- The 2022 NWSL Draft was open to any high school or college athlete who was enrolled at a university in the United States during the 2021–22 academic year; had exhausted, lost, or renounced their remaining collegiate eligibility during the 2021 calendar year; would be at least 18-years old by the conclusion of the 2022 NWSL League Season; not be under a current professional contract, nor have previously signed a contract to play soccer professionally; and registered for the NWSL Draft by the registration deadline.
- On December 3, 2021, it was announced that the board of governors had voted to increase the number of draft-eligible players ahead of the 2022 NWSL Draft. Registration was not required for the 2021 NWSL Draft due to the pandemic-altered NCAA soccer schedule. Those players who were draft-eligible, but went undrafted in the 2021 NWSL Draft, were therefore NWSL discovery-eligible in 2021, even if they retained NCAA eligibility. The updated rules for the 2022 NWSL Draft allowed players who were otherwise eligible, but currently on a NWSL team's discovery list, the choice to either remain on that team's discovery list or be removed in order to register for 2022 NWSL Draft.
- On December 14, 2021, the NWSL announced the list of players registered for the draft.
- CBS Sports covered the draft on various platforms, including CBS Sports Network, Paramount+ and CBS Sports HQ. Internationally, the draft was available to stream live on Twitch.

== Results ==
As of November 20, 2025

=== Key ===
^{+}	Denotes player who has been selected as NWSL Most Valuable Player
^{*}	Denotes player who has been selected for an NWSL Best XI or NWSL Second XI team
^{^}	Denotes player who has been selected as NWSL Rookie of the Year
^{#}	Denotes player who has never appeared in a competitive NWSL game (regular season, playoff, or Challenge Cup)

=== Picks ===
Round	Pick	Nat.	Player	Pos.	NWSL team	Notes	College
Round 1	1	(United States)	Naomi Girma *^	D	San Diego Wave FC		Stanford
Round 1	2	(United States)	Jaelin Howell	M	Racing Louisville FC	(Note: Angel City FC → Racing Louisville FC. Racing Louisville acquired the natural first-round pick in the 2022 NWSL Draft as well as $75,000 in allocation money and roster protection during the 2022 NWSL Expansion Draft from Angel City in exchange for the rights to Christen Press.)	Florida State
Round 1	3	(United States)	Emily Gray	M	North Carolina Courage	(Note: Kansas City Current → North Carolina Courage. North Carolina Courage acquired the natural first-round pick in the 2022 NWSL Draft as well as Kiki Pickett from Kansas City Current in exchange for Sam Mewis.)	Virginia Tech
Round 1	4	(United States)	Savannah DeMelo *	M	Racing Louisville FC		USC
Round 1	5	(United States)	Mia Fishel	F	Orlando Pride		UCLA
Round 1	6	(Mexico)	Diana Ordóñez *	F	North Carolina Courage	(Note: Houston Dash → Angel City FC → Racing Louisville FC → North Carolina Courage. North Carolina Courage acquired the No. 6 pick in the 2022 NWSL Draft from Racing Louisville in exchange for Jessica McDonald. Racing Louisville had acquired the No. 6 pick in the 2022 NWSL Draft and $25,000 in allocation money from Angel City in exchange for Savannah McCaskill. Angel City had acquired the No. 6 pick in the 2022 NWSL Draft from Houston Dash in exchange for the No. 26 pick in the 2022 NWSL Draft and $125,000 in allocation money.)	Virginia
Round 1	7	(United States)	Elyse Bennett	F	Kansas City Current	(Note: North Carolina Courage → Kansas City Current. Kansas City Current acquired the natural first-round pick in the 2022 NWSL Draft from North Carolina Courage in exchange for the rights to Malia Berkely and the No. 12 pick in the 2022 NWSL Draft.)	Washington State
Round 1	8	(Hungary)	Zsanett Kaján ^{#}	F	OL Reign	(Note: NJ/NY Gotham FC → OL Reign. OL Reign acquired the No. 8 pick in the 2022 NWSL Draft from NJ/NY Gotham FC in exchange for the natural first-round pick in the 2023 NWSL Draft and $40,000 in allocation money.)	St. John's
Round 1	9	(Germany)	Marleen Schimmer	F	San Diego Wave FC	(Note: OL Reign → Washington Spirit → San Diego Wave FC. San Diego Wave acquired a first-round pick in the 2022 NWSL Draft as well as the rights to Tegan McGrady and an international spot in 2022 from Washington Spirit in exchange for roster protection from San Diego in the 2022 NWSL Expansion Draft. Washington Spirit had acquired the natural first-round pick in the 2022 NWSL Draft as well as $200,000 in allocation money from OL Reign in exchange for Rose Lavelle.)	Grand Canyon
Round 1	10	(United States)	Caitlin Cosme	D	Orlando Pride	(Note: Portland Thorns FC → OL Reign → Orlando Pride. Orlando Pride acquired the No. 10 pick in the 2022 NWSL Draft as well as Celia Jiménez, Leah Pruitt, and the natural second-round pick in the 2023 NWSL Draft from OL Reign in exchange for Phoebe McClernon. OL Reign had acquired the natural first-round pick in the 2022 NWSL Draft as well as $200,000 in allocation money and an international roster spot for the 2021 season from Portland Thorns in exchange for Crystal Dunn.)	Duke
Round 1	11	(United States)	Julie Doyle	F	Orlando Pride	(Note: Chicago Red Stars → NJ/NY Gotham FC → Orlando Pride. Orlando Pride acquired a first-round pick in the 2022 NWSL Draft as well as the natural third-round pick in the 2023 NWSL Draft and $50,000 in allocation money from Gotham FC in exchange for the rights to Ashlyn Harris and Ali Krieger; the exact position of the 2022 first-round pick originally from Chicago Red Stars was confirmed by the NWSL on December 17, 2021. Gotham FC had acquired a conditional first-round pick in the 2022 NWSL Draft, the No. 4 and No. 8 picks in the 2021 NWSL Draft, and an international slot for 2021 and 2022 from Chicago Red Stars in exchange for Mallory Pugh and Sarah Woldmoe.)	Santa Clara
Round 1	12	(United States)	Kaitlin Fregulia ^{#}	D	North Carolina Courage	(Note: Washington Spirit → Kansas City Current → North Carolina Courage. North Carolina Courage acquired the No. 12 pick in the 2022 NWSL Draft as well as the rights to Malia Berkely from Kansas City Current in exchange for the No. 7 pick in the 2022 NWSL Draft. Kansas City Current had acquired the natural first-round pick in the 2022 NWSL Draft as well as $75,000 in allocation money from Washington Spirit in exchange for Kelley O'Hara.)	Long Beach State
Round 2	13	(United States)	Sydny Nasello ^{#}	F	Portland Thorns FC	(Note: Angel City FC → Portland Thorns FC. Portland Thorns acquired the natural second-round pick in the 2022 NWSL Draft, $100,000 in allocation money, and roster protection in the 2022 NWSL Expansion Draft from Angel City in exchange for Simone Charley and Tyler Lussi.)	South Florida
Round 2	14	(England)	Tinaya Alexander	F	Washington Spirit	(Note: San Diego Wave FC → Washington Spirit. Washington Spirit acquired the No. 14 pick in the 2022 NWSL Draft from San Diego Wave in exchange for $85,000 in allocation money.)	LSU
Round 2	15	(United States)	Maddie Elwell	F	Washington Spirit	(Note: Kansas City Current → OL Reign → Washington Spirit. Washington Spirit acquired the No. 15 pick in the 2022 NWSL Draft from OL Reign in exchange for $85,000 in allocation money. OL Reign had acquired a second-round pick in the 2022 NWSL Draft as well as Tziarra King from Kansas City Current in exchange for Darian Jenkins, the rights to Meg Brandt, and a fourth-round pick in the 2021 NWSL Draft.)	Vanderbilt
Round 2	16	(United States)	Charmé Morgan ^{#}	D	Racing Louisville FC		Oklahoma State
Round 2	17	(United States)	Chardonnay Curran	M	Kansas City Current	(Note: Orlando Pride → Kansas City Current. Kansas City Current acquired the natural second-round pick in the 2022 NWSL Draft as well as Kristen Edmonds from Orlando Pride in exchange for Gunnhildur Jonsdottir and the rights to Erika Tymrak.)	Oregon
Round 2	18	(United States)	Ava Cook	F	Chicago Red Stars	(Note: Houston Dash → Chicago Red Stars. Chicago Red Stars acquired the natural second-round pick in the 2022 NWSL Draft from Houston Dash in exchange for the rights to María Sánchez.)	Michigan State
Round 2	19	(El Salvador)	Samantha Fisher	M	Chicago Red Stars	(Note: North Carolina Courage → Chicago Red Stars. Chicago Red Stars acquired the natural second-round pick in the 2022 NWSL Draft as well as $35,000 in allocation money from North Carolina Courage in exchange for a 2021 international slot.)	Notre Dame
Round 2	20	(United States)	Claudia Dickey *	G	OL Reign	(Note: NJ/NY Gotham FC → OL Reign. OL Reign acquired the natural second-round pick in the 2022 NWSL Draft as well as $80,000 in allocation money from Gotham FC in exchange for Allie Long. The teams also swapped places in the Discovery Ranking order.)	North Carolina
Round 2	21	(United States)	Ryanne Brown	F	OL Reign	(Note: OL Reign → Houston Dash → OL Reign. OL Reign acquired the No. 21 pick in the 2022 NWSL Draft as well as $15,000 in allocation money from Houston Dash in exchange for Kelcie Hedge. Houston Dash had acquired a conditional second-round pick in the 2022 NWSL Draft as well as Shea Groom and Megan Oyster from OL Reign in exchange for the rights to Sofia Huerta and Amber Brooks.)	Wake Forest
Round 2	22	(United States)	Gabby Provenzano	D	Portland Thorns FC		Rutgers
Round 2	23	(England)	Lucy Shepherd ^{#}	F	Washington Spirit	(Note: Chicago Red Stars → Washington Spirit. Washington Spirit acquired the No. 23 pick in the 2022 NWSL Draft from Chicago Red Stars in exchange for Washington's highest second-round pick in the 2023 NWSL Draft and $25,000 in allocation money.)	Hofstra
Round 2	24	(United States)	Kelly Ann Livingstone	D	NJ/NY Gotham FC	(Note: Washington Spirit → NJ/NY Gotham FC. Gotham FC acquired the natural second-round pick in the 2022 NWSL Draft as well as $100,000 in allocation money from Washington Spirit in exchange for the No. 8 pick in the 2021 NWSL Draft.)	Georgetown
Round 2	25	(United States)	Sydney Pulver	M	San Diego Wave FC	(Note: Each expansion team also received an additional compensatory pick at the end of the second round with a coin flip determining San Diego would pick first.)	Washington State
Round 2	26	(United States)	Jordyn Bloomer	G	Racing Louisville FC	(Note: Angel City FC → Houston Dash → Racing Louisville FC. Racing Louisville acquired the No. 26 pick in the 2022 NWSL Draft from Houston Dash in exchange for Julia Ashley. Houston Dash had previously acquired the No. 26 pick in the 2022 NWSL Draft as well as $125,000 in allocation money from Angel City in exchange for the No. 6 pick in the 2022 NWSL Draft. Angel City had received an additional compensatory pick at the end of the second round as one of two expansion teams with a coin flip determining Angel City would pick second of the two.)	Wisconsin
Round 3	27	(United States)	Belle Briede	M	San Diego Wave FC		Stanford
Round 3	28	(United States)	Hope Breslin	M	Angel City FC		Illinois
Round 3	29	(United States)	Haleigh Stackpole ^{#}	M	North Carolina Courage	(Note: Kansas City Current → Orlando Pride → North Carolina Courage. North Carolina Courage acquired the No. 29 pick in the 2022 NWSL Draft from Orlando Pride in exchange for the rights to Deanne Rose. Orlando Pride acquired the natural third-round pick in the 2022 NWSL Draft from Kansas City Current in exchange for Jordyn Listro. The pick could have risen to Kansas City's lowest-held second-round pick in the same draft had conditions been met.)	Ole Miss
Round 3	30	(United States)	Jenna Menta ^{#}	F	Racing Louisville FC		Wake Forest
Round 3	31	(United States)	Jada Talley	F	Orlando Pride		USC
Round 3	32	(United States)	Kaile Halvorsen ^{#}	F	OL Reign	(Note: Houston Dash → OL Reign. OL Reign acquired the natural third-round pick in the 2022 NWSL Draft from Houston Dash in exchange for Jasmyne Spencer.)	Santa Clara
Round 3	33	(United States)	Olivia Van der Jagt	M	OL Reign	(Note: North Carolina Courage → OL Reign. OL Reign acquired the natural third-round pick in the 2022 NWSL Draft from North Carolina Courage in exchange for the rights to Schuyler DeBree.)	Washington
Round 3	34	(United States)	Hensley Hancuff ^{#}	G	NJ/NY Gotham FC		Clemson
Round 3	35	(United States)	Sarah Griffith	F	Chicago Red Stars	(Note: OL Reign → Chicago Red Stars. Chicago Red Stars acquired the natural third-round pick in the 2022 NWSL Draft from OL Reign in exchange for Nikki Stanton.)	Purdue
Round 3	36	(United States)	Lily Nabet	M	Angel City FC	(Note: Portland Thorns FC → OL Reign → Angel City FC. Angel City acquired the No. 36 pick of the 2022 NWSL Draft from OL Reign in exchange for $25,000 in allocation money and an agreement not to select any forwards off of OL Reign's unprotected list in the 2022 NWSL Expansion Draft. OL Reign had acquired a third-round pick in the 2022 NWSL Draft from Portland Thorns in exchange for the rights to Olivia Moultrie.)	Duke
Round 3	37	(United States)	Kayla McKeon ^{#}	M	Chicago Red Stars		Arkansas
Round 3	38	(United States)	Audrey Harding	F	Washington Spirit		UNC Wilmington
Round 4	39	(England)	Miri Taylor	F	Angel City FC		Hofstra
Round 4	40	(United States)	Kayla Bruster ^{#}	D	San Diego Wave FC		Georgia
Round 4	41	(United States)	Jenna Winebrenner	D	Kansas City Current		TCU
Round 4	42	(Guyana)	Sydney Cummings ^{#}	D	Racing Louisville FC		Georgetown
Round 4	43	(United States)	Izzy Rodriguez *	D	Kansas City Current	(Note: Orlando Pride → Kansas City Current. Kansas City Current acquired the natural fourth-round pick in the 2022 NWSL Draft from Orlando Pride in exchange for the rights to Parker Roberts.)	Ohio State
Round 4	44	(United States)	Ryan Gareis	F	Houston Dash		South Carolina
Round 4	45	(United States)	Marisa Bova	G	North Carolina Courage		Purdue
Round 4	46	(Argentina)	Raleigh Loughman ^{#}	M	NJ/NY Gotham FC		Michigan
Round 4	47	(United States)	Marley Canales	M	OL Reign		UCLA
Round 4	48	(United States)	Natalie Beckman	F	Portland Thorns FC		Denver
Round 4	49	(Jamaica)	Jayda Hylton-Pelaia ^{#}	D	Chicago Red Stars		Arizona State
Round 4	50	(United States)	Jordan Thompson	D	Washington Spirit		Gonzaga

=== Notable undrafted players ===
Below is a list of undrafted rookies who appeared in a competitive NWSL game in 2022.

Nat.	Player	Pos.	Original NWSL team	College
(United States)	Olivia Athens	M	OL Reign	UCLA
(United States)	Jenna Bike	F	NJ/NY Gotham FC	Boston College
(United States)	Amanda Kowalski	D	Chicago Red Stars	Butler
(United States)	Taylor Malham	M	Racing Louisville FC	Arkansas
(United States)	Mikenna McManus	D	Chicago Red Stars	Northeastern
(Brazil)	Thais Reiss	M	Orlando Pride	North Florida
(United States)	Frankie Tagliaferri	M	North Carolina Courage	Rutgers
(United States)	Cameron Tucker	F	NJ/NY Gotham FC	BYU

== Trades ==
Round 1:

Round 2:

Round 3:

Round 4:

Compensatory picks:

== Summary ==
In 2022, a total of 40 colleges had players selected. Of these, five had a player drafted to the NWSL for the first time: Gonzaga, Grand Canyon, Long Beach State, Michigan State and Purdue.

=== Schools with multiple draft selections ===
Selections	Schools
2	Duke, Georgetown, Hofstra, Purdue, Santa Clara, Stanford, UCLA, USC, Wake Forest, Washington State

=== Selections by college athletic conference ===
Conference	Round 1	Round 2	Round 3	Round 4	Total
ACC	4	3	3	0	10
Big East	1	1	0	1	3
Big Ten	0	3	2	3	8
Big West	1	0	0	0	1
Big 12	0	1	0	1	2
Colonial	0	1	1	1	3
Pac-12	4	2	3	2	11
SEC	0	2	2	2	6
Summit	0	0	0	1	1
The American	0	1	0	0	1
WAC	1	0	0	0	1
West Coast	1	0	1	1	3

=== Selections by position ===
Position	Round 1	Round 2	Round 3	Round 4	Total
Goalkeeper	0	2	1	1	4
Defender	3	3	0	6	12
Midfielder	3	3	6	2	14
Forward	6	6	5	3	20

== See also ==
- List of drafts held by the NWSL
- List of National Women's Soccer League draftees by college team
- 2022 National Women's Soccer League season
