= Sam Hiatt =

American soccer player (born 1998)

- Hiatt with the Portland Thorns in 2026

Personal information
- Full name: Samantha Ryan Hiatt
- Date of birth: January 6, 1998 (age 28)
- Place of birth: Kirkland, Washington
- Height: 5 ft 10 in (1.78 m)
- Position: Center back

Team information
- Current team: Portland Thorns FC
- Number: 16

College career
Years	Team	Apps	(Gls)
2016	Boston College Eagles	19	(1)
2017–2019	Stanford Cardinal	51	(2)

Senior career*
Years	Team	Apps	(Gls)
2020–2023	OL Reign	44	(0)
2024	NJ/NY Gotham FC	13	(1)
2024–	Portland Thorns	44	(0)

International career
2014–2016	United States U18		
2015–2018	United States U20		
- * Club domestic league appearances and goals as of 17:58, November 11, 2026 (UTC)

Samantha Ryan Hiatt (born January 6, 1998) is an American professional soccer player who plays as a center back for Portland Thorns FC of the National Women's Soccer League (NWSL). She previously played for OL Reign, where she helped the team win the 2022 NWSL Shield, and NJ/NY Gotham FC.

== Early life and education ==
Born in Kirkland, Washington, Hiatt attended Seattle Preparatory School, where she played for the school's varsity soccer team for four years and captained the team during her junior and senior seasons. Hiatt was named the league's defender of the year in 2016. The same year, she was named 2016 Seattle Prep Athlete of the Year. In 2015, she was named Washington State Gatorade Player of the Year and to the Best XI team of the High School All-America game.

Hiatt played club soccer for Crossfire ECNL and captained the team from 2012 to 2016. She was called up to the under-18 youth national training camp in 2014.

After transferring from Boston College, Hiatt played collegiate soccer for the Stanford Cardinal while attending Stanford University. She was a three-time All-Pac-12 selection and two-time All-American. Hiatt helped lead Stanford to the NCAA Division I Women's Soccer Championship in 2017 and 2019, and captained the team her senior year. She recorded two goals and nine assists in her Stanford tenure and was named to the all-conference third team as a senior.

== Club career ==
=== OL Reign, 2020–2023 ===
Hiatt was selected by OL Reign in the fourth round (33rd overall) of the 2020 NWSL College Draft. She made her debut for the club on October 17, 2020, in a 2–0 win against Utah Royals FC in the 2020 NWSL Fall Series during the COVID-19 pandemic.

Hiatt was a starting center back in all nine of her appearances in the 2021 season though a back injury ended her season prematurely.

During the 2022 season, Hiatt started in all 19 games and played for a total of 1,710 minutes. Her 81 clearances ranked first for the Reign and tenth in the league. In November 2022, Hiatt signed a two-year contract extension with the club through the 2024 season. OL Reign finished first in the regular season with a 11–7–4 record, winning the NWSL Shield, and advanced to the NWSL Playoffs as the number 1 seed, which afforded them a bye during the first semifinal round. They were defeated 2–0 by Kansas City Current.

=== NJ/NY Gotham FC, 2024 ===
On January 24, 2024, NJ/NY Gotham FC acquired Hiatt in a three-team trade with the Reign and Racing Louisville FC, with the Reign ultimately obtaining Louisville defender Julia Lester as part of the transaction. Hiatt made her club debut for Gotham FC on March 24, 2024, in a 1–0 win over Portland Thorns FC, and ultimately played in 17 games (12 starts). Hiatt scored her first (and to date only) professional goal on October 20, the first goal in Gotham's 3–1 victory over the Orlando Pride.

=== Portland Thorns FC, 2024– ===
On December 6, 2024, Portland Thorns FC acquired Hiatt as a free agent through the 2026 season with an option for 2027.

== International career ==
Hiatt has represented the U.S. at the youth level on the under-18 and under-20 national teams. In 2016, she played for the U.S. under-18 team and helped them win the 2016 International Cup in Spain. In 2018, she helped the under-20 team win the U-23 La Manga Tournament. The same year, she captained the under-20 team at the 2018 U-20 World Cup in Brittany, France.

== Personal life ==
Hiatt is of Filipino descent.

== Honors ==
Stanford Cardinal

- NCAA Division I Women's Soccer Championship: 2017, 2019

OL Reign

- NWSL Shield: 2022
- The Women's Cup: 2022
