= Olivia Van der Jagt =

American soccer player (born 1999)

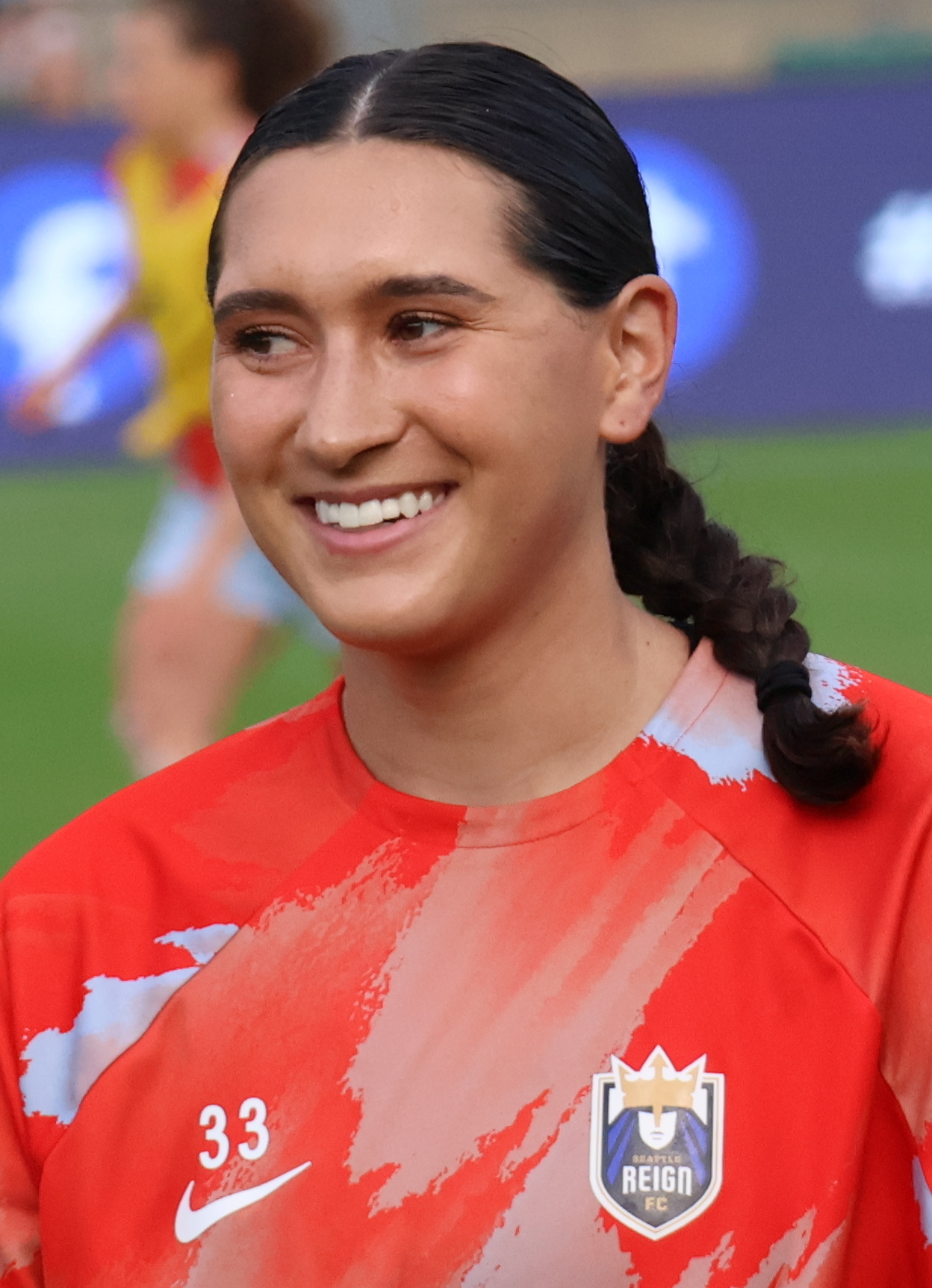
- Van der Jagt with the Seattle Reign in 2024

Personal information
- Date of birth: July 7, 1999 (age 27)
- Place of birth: Kent, Washington
- Height: 5 ft 8 in (1.73 m)
- Position: Midfielder

Youth career
- Eastside FC

College career
Years	Team	Apps	(Gls)
2017–2021	Washington Huskies	88	(12)

Senior career*
Years	Team	Apps	(Gls)
2016–2019	Seattle Sounders Women		
2022–2025	Seattle Reign	56	(1)
2025	→ Spokane Zephyr (loan)	4	(0)
- * Club domestic league appearances and goals as of October 9, 2025

Olivia Van der Jagt (born July 7, 1999) is an American professional soccer player who plays as a midfielder. She played college soccer for the Washington Huskies before being drafted by the OL Reign (later Seattle Reign FC) in the third round of the 2022 NWSL Draft.

== Early life ==
Van der Jagt played youth soccer and volleyball starting at the age of 4, playing for Dos FC; PacNW; Eastside FC of Issaquah, Washington, where she won two Washington state championships; and the Kentridge High School Chargers of Kent, Washington. She was selected to the 2016 NSCAA All-America Team. Parallel to her soccer career, she also played volleyball until her sophomore year of high school.

== College career ==
Van der Jagt chose the University of Washington Huskies over other Pac-12 universities. She scored 12 goals and 9 assists in her collegiate career as a midfielder, and was selected to the All-Pac-12 third team in 2021. After starting four matches in her freshman season, she became a regular starter for the Huskies. While attending the University of Washington, she also played for the Seattle Sounders Women from 2016 to 2019, winning one championship with the club

== Club career ==
=== Seattle Reign ===
The OL Reign (later Seattle Reign FC) selected Van der Jagt with the 33rd-overall pick in the third round of the 2022 NWSL Draft, and signed her to a one-year contract on March 18, 2022. She debuted for OL Reign on April 14, 2022, during the 2022 NWSL Challenge Cup against San Diego Wave FC and scored her first professional goal in stoppage time against Angel City FC three days later, a game-winning goal that secured OL Reign's semifinals berth in the tournament.

==== Spokane Zephyr (loan) ====
On July 9, 2025, the Reign loaned Van der Jagt to Spokane Zephyr FC of the USL Super League through the end of 2025. Van der Jagt made her Zephyr debut on August 23, coming on as a second-half substitute for Mollie Rouse in Spokane's season-opening loss to Dallas Trinity FC. She made three more appearances (two starts) for Spokane before being recalled to Seattle on October 9, 2025. Exactly two months later, she departed from the Reign on a mutual contract termination.

== Honors ==
OL Reign

- NWSL Shield: 2022
- The Women's Cup: 2022

== Personal life ==
Van der Jagt's father, Gerard, played for the Suriname national volleyball team.
