= Meg Brandt =

American soccer player

Personal information
- Full name: Meg Marie Brandt
- Date of birth: April 19, 1998 (age 28)
- Place of birth: Ankeny, Iowa
- Height: 1.70 m (5 ft 7 in)
- Position: Midfielder

College career
Years	Team	Apps	(Gls)
2016–2019	Nebraska Cornhuskers	80	(15)

Senior career*
Years	Team	Apps	(Gls)
2020	Kolbotn	5	(0)
2021–2022	MSV Duisburg	16	(0)

International career
2019	United States U23		
- * Club domestic league appearances and goals

Meg Marie Brandt (born April 19, 1998) is an American soccer player who plays midfield for Kolbotn Fotball.
