= Ella Dederick =

American professional soccer player

Personal information
- Full name: Ella Iris Dederick
- Date of birth: July 27, 1996 (age 30)
- Place of birth: Camarillo, California, United States
- Height: 5 ft 10 in (1.78 m)
- Position: Goalkeeper

College career
Years	Team	Apps	(Gls)
2014–2019	Washington State Cougars	90	(0)

Senior career*
Years	Team	Apps	(Gls)
2021	OL Reign	3	(0)
2022–2023	Houston Dash	0	(0)

International career
2018	United States U23		
- * Club domestic league appearances and goals as of December 23, 2021

Ella Iris Dederick (born July 27, 1996) is an American professional soccer player who plays as a goalkeeper.

== Club career ==
Dederick made her NWSL debut on May 30, 2021.

On December 22, 2021, Dederick was traded to the Houston Dash.
