= 2023 Angel City FC season =

Angel City FC soccer season

Angel City FC
2023 season
- Owners: List of Angel City FC owners
- General manager: Angela Hucles Mangano
- Head coach: Freya Coombe (until Jun 14); Becki Tweed (interim, Jun 14-Nov 2) (Nov 2-)
- Stadium: BMO Stadium (capacity: 22,000)
- League: 5th
- Challenge Cup: Group stage
- Playoffs: Quarterfinals
- Top goalscorer: League: Alyssa Thompson (4); Savannah McCaskill (4); All: Savannah McCaskill (6)
- Highest home attendance: 22,000 (five times)
- Lowest home attendance: 16,682 (Jun 5 vs. CHI)
- Average home league attendance: 19,427
- Biggest win: 5–1 (Oct 15 vs. POR)
- Biggest defeat: 1–4 (May 27 vs. RGN)
Home colors	Away colors
- All statistics correct as of November 2, 2023.

The 2023 Angel City FC season was the team's second season as a professional women's soccer team. Angel City FC played in the National Women's Soccer League (NWSL), the top tier of women's soccer in the United States.

== Background ==
=== Coaching changes ===
On January 11, 2023, Angel City FC announced the hiring of NJ/NY Gotham FC assistant coach Becki Tweed to the same role, reuniting her with head coach Freya Coombe. Angel City then hired Melissa Phillips as first assistant coach on January 22.

== Summary ==
=== March ===
Angel City FC hosted Club América in an international club friendly on March 8, 2023, winning 3–0. High-school draft pick Alyssa Thompson made her professional debut and scored her first professional goal in the match.

HBO announced on March 23 a three-party documentary series titled Angel City that covered the club's founding. The series aired in May.

As of March 24, Angel City FC reportedly had 16,000 season ticket holders.

Angel City played its season and home opener on March 26, against NJ/NY Gotham FC. The match featured Thompson's first regular-season goal, and the first use of video assistant referee (VAR) in the NWSL, which overturned a Jun Endo goal for Angel City scored from midfield. The club lost the match 1–2.

On March 29, Angel City announced the transfer and signing of Mexico national team forward and San Diego native Scarlett Camberos from Club América of Mexico's Liga MX Femenil for an undisclosed fee. Camberos had experienced persistent harassment from a fan while playing for América and requested the transfer for her safety.

=== April ===
During a match against Orlando Pride on April 2, Angel City forward Simone Charley suffered a ruptured Achilles tendon. On April 11, the club placed her on its season-ending injury list. The 2–1 match was Angel City's first win of the regular season, but it would be their only win of the month, ending April with a 1–2–2 record on the season in league play and a loss in the month's only match of the 2023 NWSL Challenge Cup.

On April 7, assistant coach Melissa Phillips accepted the role of manager at Brighton & Hove Albion of the English Women's Super League.

On April 17, Angel City announced the signing of United States national team midfielder Julie Ertz to a one-year contract.

=== May ===
On May 13, Angel City FC lost a match against Washington Spirit 1–0 after Ashley Hatch scored a penalty kick. Referee JC Griggs awarded the penalty as the result of a handball call, ruling the foul was a result of a deflection of the ball off Angel City defender M.A. Vignola's body and into her shoulder, which her arm movement had been made "unnaturally bigger, blocking the path of the ball". The call was reviewed and confirmed by VAR. Following the match, coach Freya Coombe obstructed club president Julie Uhrman from confronting officials on the pitch. On May 17, Uhrman was fined an undisclosed amount by the league for violating league policies against approaching officials.

On May 20, goalkeeper DiDi Haračić and the Angel City defense registered its first shutout in a 0–0 draw against North Carolina Courage. On the same day, Angel City announced that defender Vanessa Gilles's loan to Olympique Lyon would be extended to June 2024 from its previous expiration of the end of Lyon's 2022–23 season in June.

On May 25, Sports Business Journal named the club its 2023 sports team of the year, over the NFL's Buffalo Bills, NHL's Florida Panthers, and NBA's Golden State Warriors.

On May 27, Angel City FC suffered its worst loss since June 3, 2022, losing 1–4 to OL Reign in Seattle despite going up early on a Claire Emslie goal scored directly from a corner. The Reign outshot Angel City 25–7, and Megan Rapinoe assisted on all the Reign's first three goals. Angel City closed the month with a May 31 Challenge Cup loss at Portland Thorns FC, fighting back from a 0–2 deficit to equalize in the second half but conceding a goal in the 3rd minute of second-half stoppage time to lose 2–3.

=== June ===
On June 1, Angel City announced the signing of French midfielder Amandine Henry, formerly of Olympique Lyon.

On June 5, forward Sydney Leroux made her return from an ankle injury and scored in a 1–2 defeat against Chicago Red Stars.

On June 15, 2023, Angel City FC announced that it had "parted ways" with head coach Freya Coombe the previous day. A report by Meg Linehan in The Athletic published on June 14 claimed the team had fired her. Her firing followed a 2–6–3 start to the season, and Angel City were in 11th place of 12 teams at the time of her exit. The team named assistant coach Becki Tweed as Coombe's interim replacement.

Following the departure of Coombe, in interim coach Becki Tweed's first official game as head coach, Angel City was able to comeback from a 1–0 deficit to defeat rivals San Diego Wave away in San Diego in a 1–2 victory with M.A. Vignola scoring the match winner.

On June 25, Angel City was able to keep their undefeated streak going in a 0–0 draw against Houston Dash in the last match before players who had been called up for the 2023 FIFA Women's World Cup in Australia and New Zealand departed. Four Angel City players, Jun Endo, Ali Riley, Julie Ertz, and Alyssa Thompson had been selected by their respective national teams to represent their countries at the World Cup. Due to the unavailability of those players during this period, Angel City announced on June 28 that they would be signing defenders Elizabeth Eddy and Kelsey Hill as National Team Replacement Players (NTRP).

On June 28, Angel City once again defeated rivals San Diego Wave in their first meeting of the group stage in the 2023 Challenge Cup.

=== July ===
On July 2, Angel City was once again held to a scoreless draw against NJ/NY Gotham FC in New Jersey.

On July 5, M.A. Vignola was selected in the NWSL Best XI for June.

On July 9, in the last match before a three-week break for the World Cup, Angel City was able to secure a 2–1 home victory against North Carolina Courage due to a late own goal by Courage defender Kaleigh Kurtz to continue their unbeaten run under interim coach Tweed.

On July 29, Angel City returned to the pitch in the 2023 Challenge Cup in a match against Portland Thorns at home which was won 2–1 a brace from Savannah McCaskill as well as penalty save against Olivia Moultrie by Angelina Anderson in her first professional appearance to secure the win.

=== August ===
On August 2, the NWSL announced that Savannah McCaskill was selected as the Player of the Month for July and was also selected in the Best XI of the month along with Sarah Gorden.

On August 5, Angel City traveled to play rivals San Diego Wave in their final match of the 2023 Challenge Cup group stage which finished in a 1–1 draw. At the completion of the group stage Angel City finished second in the West Division overall, behind OL Reign with 8 points from a 2–2–2 record. Despite being possibly eligible to possibly advance to the knockout stage by finishing second, Angel City was ultimately ranked third among the second-placed teams behind Racing Louisville FC and NJ/NY Gotham FC and were eliminated from the tournament.

On August 14, Angel City officially announced that defender Alyson Swaby who was already out on loan to Paris Saint-Germain, would not be returning to Angel City and be permanently transferred to AC Milan for an "agreed-upon fee".

On August 17, Angel City announced that they had re-signed NTR players Elizabeth Eddy and Kelsey Hill to new contracts that would keep them at the club until the end of the season.

On August 20, in the first NWSL regular season match since the World Cup break, Angel City traveled to play Racing Louisville FC which ended in a 1–1 draw. A week later on August 27, in the first home game after the World Cup break, Angel City defeated OL Reign for the first time in the clubs history in a 2–1 victory which also saw Madison Hammond score her first NWSL goal against her former club which eventually was the match winner.

On August 31, Julie Ertz announced her retirement from professional soccer and that she would not finish the remainder of the season.

=== September ===
On September 1, Angel City extender their unbeaten steak under interim coach Tweed to ten matches with a 0–1 victory against Kansas City Current which saw Jasmyne Spencer score her first goal for Angel City and Amandine Henry make her debut after recovering from a calf injury which also forced her to pull out from the French World Cup squad. On September 17, Angel City traveled to Chicago to play Chicago Red Stars which ended in a 2–2 draw.

On September 26, it was announced that Angel City would be extending Sydney Leroux's contract through December 2024.

=== October ===
On October 2, Angel City's thirteen game unbeaten steak came to an end with a 1–0 defeat against Orlando Pride after a goal from Adriana. On October 8, in a must win game to keep their playoff hopes alive, Angel City came down from a 1–0 deficit against Houston Dash to win the match 1–2 with goals from Alyssa Thompson and Savannah McCaskill.

On October 15, the final day of the NWSL regular season, Angel City had the chance to secure their first spot in the playoffs in their match against the defending champions Portland Thorns. Angel City went on to win the game 5–1 in their biggest victory ever and successfully secured a spot in the NWSL Playoffs as they eventually finished fifth overall with a record of 8–7–7 despite being in 11th of 12th place when former head coach Freya Coombe was fired in June.

On October 18, it was announced that M.A. Vignola, Sarah Gorden, and Savannah McCaskill were selected in the NWSL Best XI of the month for September/October. Gorden also became Angel City's second Iron Woman after playing every minute of the 2023 regular season.

On October 20, Angel City competed in their first NWSL Playoff Match against OL Reign at Lumen Field in Seattle which ended in a 1–0 defeat after a late goal from Veronica Latsko.

=== November ===
On November 2, it was announced that Becki Tweed would officially assume the role of head coach after her successful term as interim head coach since her appointment in June.

On November 6 after the conclusion of the season, it was announced that defender Sarah Gorden was selected in the 2023 NWSL Best XI team with M.A. Vignola and Savannah McCaskill being named to the 2023 Best XI Second Team.

== Style of play ==
Under head coach Freya Coombe, Angel City deploy a four-player backline with a focus on possession and building play from the back.

== Stadium and facilities ==
Angel City FC continued to play in BMO Stadium, their home since the team's inaugural season in 2022. The stadium's name changed from Banc of California Stadium in 2022.

== Broadcasting ==
On April 25, 2023, Angel City FC announced a partnership with Bally Sports SoCal to broadcast eight live matches on the regional sports network and Bally Sports app, and also to rebroadcast matches and feature Angel City on the Bally Sports website. Bally Sports SoCal also broadcast Angel City's preseason friendly against Club América on March 8.

== Team ==
=== Staff ===
As of June 14, 2023.

Technical
General manager	Angela Hucles Mangano
Interim head coach	Becki Tweed
Assistant coach	Eleri Earnshaw
Goalkeeper coach	Daniel Ball
Medical
Director of medical and performance	(Canada) Sarah Smith
Head of sports science	(United States) Dan Jones
Head athletic trainer	(United States) Manny De Alba

=== Squad ===
As of June 28, 2023.

No.	Nat.	Name	Date of birth (age)	Since	Previous team	Notes
Goalkeepers
1	(United States)	Brittany Isenhour	September 22, 1997 (aged 25)	2021	(United States) Orlando Pride	
13	(Bosnia and Herzegovina)	DiDi Haračić	April 12, 1992 (aged 30)	2021	(United States) NJ/NY Gotham FC	
19	(United States)	Angelina Anderson	March 22, 2001 (aged 22)	2023	(United States) University of California-Berkeley	
Defenders
4	(Canada)	Vanessa Gilles	March 11, 1996 (aged 27)	2021	(France) Bordeaux	LOAN (Note: Loaned out to another team)
5	(New Zealand)	Ali Riley	October 30, 1987 (aged 35)	2022	(United States) Orlando Pride	
6	(United States)	Megan Reid	July 9, 1996 (aged 26)	2022	(United States) Lamorinda United	
11	(United States)	Sarah Gorden	September 13, 1992 (aged 30)	2021	(United States) Chicago Red Stars	
12	(United States)	Merritt Mathias	July 2, 1990 (aged 32)	2023	(United States) North Carolina Courage	
14	(United States)	Paige Nielsen	October 14, 1993 (aged 29)	2021	(United States) Washington Spirit	
16	(United States)	M.A. Vignola	February 11, 1998 (aged 25)	2021	(Iceland) Valur (via Washington Spirit)	
25	(Jamaica)	Allyson Swaby	October 3, 1996 (aged 26)	2021	(Italy) AS Roma	LOAN
36	(United States)	Kelsey Hill	November 8, 1999 (aged 23)	2023	(United States) Pepperdine Waves	NTR (Note: Short-term national team replacement player signing)
99	(United States)	Madison Hammond	November 15, 1997 (aged 25)	2022	(United States) OL Reign	
Midfielders
8	(United States)	Julie Ertz	April 6, 1992 (aged 30)	2023	(United States) Chicago Red Stars	
9	(United States)	Savannah McCaskill	July 31, 1996 (aged 26)	2021	(United States) Racing Louisville FC	
17	(United States)	Dani Weatherholt	March 17, 1994 (aged 29)	2021	(United States) OL Reign	
21	(United States)	Alyssa Thompson	November 7, 2004 (aged 18)	2023	(United States) Total Futbol Academy	
24	(United States)	Mackenzie Pluck	April 12, 2000 (aged 22)	2023	(United States) Duke University	
26	(France)	Amandine Henry	September 28, 1989 (aged 33)	2023	(France) Olympique Lyon	
28	(United States)	Lily Nabet	September 24, 1999 (aged 23)	2022	(United States) Duke University	
29	(France)	Clarisse Le Bihan	December 14, 1994 (aged 28)	2022	(France) Montpellier	
44	(United States)	Elizabeth Eddy	September 13, 1993 (aged 29)	2023	(United States) Houston Dash	NTR
Forwards
2	(United States)	Sydney Leroux	May 7, 1990 (aged 32)	2022	(United States) Orlando Pride	
3	(United States)	Jasmyne Spencer	August 27, 1990 (aged 32)	2021	(United States) Houston Dash	
7	(United States)	Simone Charley	February 4, 1995 (aged 28)	2021	(United States) Portland Thorns FC	SEI (Note: Season-ending injury)
10	(Scotland)	Claire Emslie	March 8, 1994 (aged 29)	2022	(United States) Orlando Pride	
15	(Mexico)	Scarlett Camberos	November 20, 2000 (aged 22)	2023	(Mexico) Club América	
18	(Japan)	Jun Endo	May 24, 2000 (aged 22)	2021	(Japan) Tokyo Verdy Beleza	
23	(United States)	Christen Press	December 29, 1988 (aged 34)	2021	(England) Manchester United (via Racing Louisville FC)	SEI
33	(Mexico)	Katie Johnson	September 14, 1994 (aged 28)	2023	(United States) San Diego Wave FC	

== Transactions ==
=== 2023 NWSL Draft ===
Draft picks are not automatically signed to the team roster. The 2023 NWSL Draft was held on January 12, 2023, in Philadelphia, Pennsylvania.

R	P	Nat.	Player	Pos.	College/school	Status	Ref.
1	1	(United States)	Alyssa Thompson	FW	Harvard-Westlake School	Signed to a three-year contract.	
3	27	(United States)	Angelina Anderson	GK	California	Signed to a one-year contract.	

=== Contract options ===
Date	Nat.	Player	Pos.	Notes	Ref.
November 15, 2022	(United States)	Hope Breslin	MF	Contract expired.	
November 15, 2022	(England)	Miri Taylor	FW	Contract expired.	
November 15, 2022	(United States)	Katie Cousins	MF	Contract expired.	
November 15, 2022	(Germany)	Almuth Schult	GK	Contract expired.	
November 15, 2022	(Brazil)	Stefany Ferrer Van Ginkel	MF	Contract expired.	

=== Re-signings ===
Date	Nat.	Player	Pos.	Notes	Ref.
December 4, 2022	(United States)	Jasmyne Spencer	DF	Re-signed to a two-year contract with a third-year option.	
December 7, 2022	(United States)	Megan Reid	DF	Re-signed to a one-year contract.	
December 15, 2022	(United States)	Paige Nielsen	DF	Signed a two-year contract extension.	
March 2, 2023	(Bosnia and Herzegovina)	DiDi Haračić	GK	Signed a two-year contract extension with a third-year option.	
June 29, 2023	(New Zealand)	Ali Riley	DF	Signed a contract extension through the 2025 season.	
September 26, 2023	(United States)	Sydney Leroux	FW	Signed a contract extension through the 2024 season.	

=== Preseason trialists ===
Date	Nat.	Player	Pos.	Previous club	Fee/notes	Ref.
January 30, 2023	(United States)	Gisele Thompson	MF	(United States) Total Futbol Academy	U18 trialist; not signed.	
January 30, 2023	(United States)	Mia Minestrella	MF	(United States) Beach FC	U18 trialist; not signed.	
January 30, 2023	(United States)	Rachel Diodati	DF	(United States) Michigan State University	Not signed.	
January 30, 2023	(United States)	Kelsey Hill	DF	(United States) Pepperdine University	Not signed.	
January 30, 2023	(United States)	Taylor Aylmer	MF	(United States) Washington Spirit	Not signed.	
January 30, 2023	(United States)	Molly McLaughlin	MF	(United States) Xavier University	Not signed.	
January 30, 2023	(United States)	Mackenzie Pluck	MF	(United States) Duke University	Signed to a one-year contract.	
January 30, 2023	(United States)	Domi Richardson	MF	(United States) NJ/NY Gotham FC	Not signed.	

=== Loans out ===
Date	Nat.	Player	Pos.	Destination club	Fee/notes	Ref.
September 19, 2022	(Canada)	Vanessa Gilles	DF	(France) Olympique Lyon	Expected to return after the 2023–24 Division 1 Féminine season.	
January 30, 2023	(Jamaica)	Allyson Swaby	DF	(France) Paris Saint-Germain	Loaned until June 2023.	

=== Transfers in ===
Date	Nat.	Player	Pos.	Previous club	Fee/notes	Ref.
January 19, 2023	(United States)	Merritt Mathias	DF	(United States) North Carolina Courage	Acquired in exchange for Tyler Lussi with a contract through 2023 with a one-year option.	
January 25, 2023	(Mexico)	Katie Johnson	FW	(United States) San Diego Wave FC	Signed to a two-year contract.	
March 29, 2023	(Mexico)	Scarlett Camberos	FW	(Mexico) Club América	Transferred for an undisclosed fee and signed to a two-year contract.	
April 17, 2023	(United States)	Julie Ertz	MF	(United States) Chicago Red Stars	Signed to a one-year contract.	
June 1, 2023	(France)	Amandine Henry	MF	(France) Olympique Lyon	Signed to a three-year contract with an option for a fourth year.	
June 28, 2023	(United States)	Elizabeth Eddy	DF	(United States) Houston Dash	Signed as short-term national team replacement players.	
June 28, 2023	(United States)	Kelsey Hill	DF	(United States) Pepperdine Waves	Signed as short-term national team replacement players.	

=== Transfers out ===
Date	Nat.	Player	Pos.	Destination club	Fee/notes	Ref.
January 19, 2023	(United States)	Tyler Lussi	FW	(United States) North Carolina Courage	Traded in exchange for Merritt Mathias.	
January 25, 2023	(United States)	Cari Roccaro	MF	(United States) Chicago Red Stars	Traded in exchange for $65,000 in allocation money.	
August 14, 2023	(Jamaica)	Allyson Swaby	DF	(Italy) AC Milan	Traded in exchange for an undisclosed sum.	

=== Retirements ===
Date	Nat.	Player	Pos.	Ref.
November 15, 2022	(United States)	Maia Pérez	GK	

=== Injury listings ===
Date	Nat.	Player	Pos.	List	Injury/Notes	Ref.
	(United States)	Christen Press	FW	Season-ending injury	Continuing recovery from a right knee anterior cruciate ligament tear.	
April 11, 2023	(United States)	Simone Charley	FW	Season-ending injury	Ruptured Achilles tendon.	

== Competitions ==
=== Preseason ===
March 8, 2023	Angel City FC (United States)	3–0	(Mexico) Club América	Los Angeles, California
7:30 p.m. PDT (UTC-7)	Thompson 5'; Nielsen 56'; Charley 85'	ACFC report AS report Los Angeles Times report		Stadium: BMO Stadium; Attendance: 15,021

March 18, 2023	San Diego Wave FC	v	Angel City FC	San Diego, California
				Stadium: Snapdragon Stadium
Note: Attendance was limited to Wave FC season ticket holders.

=== NWSL Challenge Cup ===
Angel City finished fourth in the West Division during the 2022 NWSL Challenge Cup and did not advance. Angel City FC returned to the West Division in the 2023 tournament.

==== Group stage ====
April 19, 2023 1	Angel City FC	0–2	OL Reign	Los Angeles, California
7:00 p.m. PDT (UTC-7)	Johnson (yellow card) 86'	Report	Stanton (yellow card) 40'; Huitema 64'; Le Bihan 77' (o.g.)	Stadium: BMO Stadium; Attendance: 10,021; Referee: Anya Voigt

May 3, 2023 2	OL Reign	0–0	Angel City FC	Seattle, Washington
7:00 p.m. PDT (UTC-7)		Report	McCaskill (yellow card) 79'	Stadium: Lumen Field; Attendance: 5,511; Referee: Adam Kilpatrick

May 31, 2023 3	Portland Thorns FC	3–2	Angel City FC	Portland, Oregon
7:00 p.m. PDT (UTC-7)	Vasconcelos 23' (D'Aquila); D'Aquila 46' (Moultrie); Nally (yellow card) 86'; Weaver 90+3' (Sinclair)	Report	Le Bihan 61' (Camberos); Emslie 66' (pen.); Spencer (yellow card) 72'	Stadium: Providence Park; Attendance: 16,429; Referee: Adorae Monroy

June 28, 2023 4	Angel City FC	2–1	San Diego Wave FC	Los Angeles, California
7:30 p.m. PDT (UTC-7)	Hammond 2'; Le Bihan 18'	Report	Colaprico 63'	Stadium: BMO Stadium; Attendance: 13,648; Referee: Katja Koroleva

July 29, 2023 5	Angel City FC	2–1	Portland Thorns FC	Los Angeles, California
7:00 p.m. PDT (UTC-7)	McCaskill 9', 47'	Report	Weaver 44'	Stadium: BMO Stadium; Attendance: 13,154; Referee: Brandon Stevis

August 5, 2023 6	San Diego Wave FC	1–1	Angel City FC	San Diego, California
4:30 p.m. PDT (UTC-7)	Shaw 11'; Doniak (yellow card) 35'	Report	Camberos 16'; Gorden (yellow card) 57'	Stadium: Snapdragon Stadium; Attendance: 14,408; Referee: Elijio Arreguin

==== West Division standings ====
Pos	Team	Pld	W	T	L	GF	GA	GD	Pts	Qualification	RGN	LA	POR	SD
1	OL Reign	6	4	2	0	7	0	+7	14	Advance to knockout stage	—	0–0	0–0	1–0
2	Angel City FC	6	2	2	2	7	8	−1	8		0–2	—	2–1	2–1
3	Portland Thorns FC	6	2	1	3	8	7	+1	7		0–1	3–2	—	4–1
4	San Diego Wave FC	6	1	1	4	4	11	−7	4		0–3	1–1	1–0	—

Source: NWSL

==== Results by matchday ====
Matchday	1	2	3	4	5	6
Stadium	A	H	H	H	A	A
Result	L	D	L	W	W	D
Position	4	3	4			2

Updated to match(es) played on May 31, 2023. Source: NWSL
A = Away; H = Home; W = Win; D = Draw; L = Loss

=== Regular season ===
==== Matches ====
March 26, 2023 1	Angel City FC	1–2	NJ/NY Gotham FC	Los Angeles, California
6:00 p.m. PDT (UTC-7)	Thompson 11' (Weatherholt); Riley (yellow card) 50'; Haračić (yellow card) 54'; McCaskill (yellow card) 54'; Johnson (yellow card) 54'	Report	Ryan (yellow card) 21'; Purce 55'; Williams 65'; Bruninha (yellow card) 69'	Stadium: BMO Stadium; Attendance: 22,000; Referee: Elijio Arreguin

April 2, 2023 2	Orlando Pride	1–2	Angel City FC	Orlando, Florida
5:30 p.m. EDT (UTC-4)	Madril (yellow card) 37'; Bright 51' (Tymrak); Strom (yellow card) 55'; McCutcheon (yellow card) 87'	Report	Nielsen (yellow card) 19'; Emslie 39' (pen.); Hammond (yellow card) 48'; Johnson 90+10' (Emslie)	Stadium: Exploria Stadium; Attendance: 7,137; Referee: Danielle Chesky

April 15, 2023 3	Angel City FC	2–2	Racing Louisville FC	Los Angeles, California
7:00 p.m. PDT (UTC-7)	Johnson 68' (McCaskill); McCaskill 87'	Report	DeMelo 3' (pen.) (yellow card) 77'; Davis 32' (DeMelo); Pikkujämsä (yellow card) 70'	Stadium: BMO Stadium; Attendance: 18,007; Referee: Brad Jensen

April 23, 2023 4	Angel City FC	0–2	San Diego Wave FC	Los Angeles, California
5:00 p.m. PDT (UTC-7)		Report	Ali (yellow card) 24'; Hill (yellow card) 56'; Jakobsson 70' (Westphal); Doniak 75' (Morgan)	Stadium: BMO Stadium; Attendance: 22,000; Referee: Katja Koroleva

April 29, 2023 5	Portland Thorns FC	3–3	Angel City FC	Portland, Oregon
7:30 p.m. PDT (UTC-7)	Sugita 32' (pen.); Weaver 66' (Moultrie); Natalia Kuikka (yellow card) 77'; Bixby 90+7'	Report	Thompson 10' (Endo); Ertz (yellow card) 30' (goal) 79' (Le Bihan); Kuikka 74' (o.g.)	Stadium: Providence Park; Attendance: 16,938; Referee: Elton García

May 7, 2023 6	Angel City FC	3–2	Kansas City Current	Los Angeles, California
5:00 p.m. PDT (UTC-7)	McCaskill (yellow card) 18'; Thompson 31' (Emslie); Emslie 43' (Endo); Endo 45+1' (Hammond)	Report	Rodriguez 57' (Kizer); Kizer 61'	Stadium: BMO Stadium; Attendance: 19,219; Referee: Tori Penso

May 13, 2023 7	Angel City FC	0–1	Washington Spirit	Los Angeles, California
7:00 p.m. PDT (UTC-7)	Nielsen (yellow card) 38'; McCaskill (yellow card) 62'; Hammond (yellow card) 75'; Vignola (yellow card) 90+1'; Haračić (yellow card) 90+4'	Report	Hatch 90+4' (pen.)	Stadium: BMO Stadium; Attendance: 17,427; Referee: JC Griggs

May 20, 2023 8	North Carolina Courage	0–0	Angel City FC	Cary, North Carolina
7:00 p.m. EDT (UTC-4)	O'Sullivan (yellow card) 68'	Report		Stadium: WakeMed Soccer Park; Attendance: 4,723; Referee: Sergii Demianchuk

May 27, 2023 9	OL Reign	4–1	Angel City FC	Seattle, Washington
12:30 p.m. PDT (UTC-7)	Bennett 34' (Rapinoe); Latsko 52' (Rapinoe), 55' (Rapinoe); Quinn 82' (Stanton)	Report	Weatherholt (yellow card) 22'; Emslie 27'; Le Bihan (yellow card) 61'	Stadium: Lumen Field; Attendance: 7,620; Referee: Thomas Snyder

June 5, 2023 10	Angel City FC	1–2	Chicago Red Stars	Los Angeles, California
7:00 p.m. PDT (UTC-7)	Riley (yellow card) 85'; Leroux 88' (Thompson)	Report	Cook 16' (Bianchi), 27' (Nagasato) (yellow card) 57'	Stadium: BMO Stadium; Attendance: 16,682; Referee: Alex Billeter
Note: Rescheduled from 5 p.m. PDT on June 4 due to Los Angeles FC advancing to the 2023 CONCACAF Champions League final.

June 10, 2023 11	Washington Spirit	2–1	Angel City FC	Washington, DC
7:00 p.m. EDT (UTC-4)	Hatch 33', 41' (Metayer); Parsons (yellow card) 90+11'	Report	Vignola 45+2' (Emslie)	Stadium: Audi Field; Attendance: 10,032; Referee: Alyssa Nichols

June 17, 2023 12	San Diego Wave FC	1–2	Angel City FC	San Diego, California
1:00 p.m. PDT (UTC-7)	McNabb 57' (Morgan)	Report	Le Bihan (yellow card) 62'; Nielsen 69' (Le Bihan); Vignola 88' (Camberos)	Stadium: Snapdragon Stadium; Attendance: 25,515; Referee: Matthew Thompson

June 25, 2023 13	Angel City FC	0–0	Houston Dash	Los Angeles, California
5:00 p.m. PDT (UTC-7)	Weatherholt (yellow card) 62'; Vignola (yellow card) 88'	Report	Lind (red card) 58'	Stadium: BMO Stadium; Attendance: 22,000; Referee: Sergii Demianchuk

July 2, 2023 14	NJ/NY Gotham FC	0–0	Angel City FC	Harrison, New Jersey
5:30 p.m. EDT (UTC-4)	Nighswonger (yellow card) 35'; Martin (yellow card) 54'	Report	Nabet (yellow card) 44'	Stadium: Red Bull Arena; Attendance: 4,991; Referee: Calin Radosav

July 9, 2023 15	Angel City FC	2–1	North Carolina Courage	Los Angeles, California
5:00 p.m. PDT (UTC-7)	McCaskill 18' (Camberos); Kurtz 77' (o.g.)	Report	Pinto 15' (Tagliaferri); Williams (yellow card) 55'	Stadium: BMO Stadium; Attendance: 17,876; Referee: Jeremy Scheer

August 19, 2023 16	Racing Louisville FC	1–1	Angel City FC	Louisville, Kentucky
7:30 p.m. EDT (UTC-4)	Davis 79' (Pokorny); Holloway (yellow card) 49'; Wang (yellow card) 58'	Report	Johnson 67' (McCaskill) (yellow card) 90+3'	Stadium: Lynn Family Stadium; Attendance: 10,214; Referee: Danielle Chesky

August 27, 2023 17	Angel City FC	2–1	OL Reign	Los Angeles, California
5:00 p.m. PDT (UTC-7)	Le Bihan 13' (Camberos); Hammond 57' (Le Bihan); McCaskill (yellow card) 64'; Johnson (yellow card) 90+3'	Report	Rapinoe 74' (pen.); Hiatt (yellow card) 64'	Stadium: BMO Stadium; Attendance: 22,000; Referee: Brad Jensen

September 1, 2023 18	Kansas City Current	0-1	Angel City FC	Kansas City, Kansas
7:00 p.m. CDT (UTC-6)	Del Fava (yellow card) 90+7'	Report	Spencer 66' (Le Bihan)	Stadium: Children's Mercy Park; Attendance: 11,827; Referee: Calin Radosav

September 17, 2023 19	Chicago Red Stars	2-2	Angel City FC	Bridgeview, Illinois
7:00 p.m. CDT (UTC-6)	Cook 68'; Matthews 75'	Report	Riley 39'; Endō 71'	Stadium: SeatGeek Stadium; Attendance: 8,961; Referee: Alyssa Nichols

October 2, 2023 20	Angel City FC	0-1	Orlando Pride	Los Angeles, California
7:00 p.m. PDT (UTC-7)		Report	Adriana 22'	Stadium: BMO Stadium; Attendance: 18,102; Referee: Brandon Stevis

October 8, 2023 21	Houston Dash	1-2	Angel City FC	Houston, Texas
6:00 p.m. CDT (UTC-6)	Andressa 44'	Report	Thompson 68'; McCaskill 90+1'	Stadium: Shell Energy Stadium; Attendance: 9,175; Referee: Katja Koroleva

October 15, 2023 22	Angel City FC	5-1	Portland Thorns FC	Los Angeles, California
2:00 p.m. PDT (UTC-7)	Vignola 36'; Camberos 38'; McCaskill 47'; Leroux 51'; Endo 80'	Report	Sugita 79'	Stadium: BMO Stadium; Attendance: 22,000; Referee: Elvis Osmanovic

==== Regular season standings ====
Pos	Team	Pld	W	D	L	GF	GA	GD	Pts	Qualification
3	North Carolina Courage	22	9	6	7	29	22	+7	33	Playoff quarterfinals
4	OL Reign	22	9	5	8	29	24	+5	32	Playoff quarterfinals
5	Angel City FC	22	8	7	7	31	30	+1	31	Playoff quarterfinals
6	NJ/NY Gotham FC (C)	22	8	7	7	25	24	+1	31	Playoff quarterfinals
7	Orlando Pride	22	10	1	11	27	28	−1	31	

Source: NWSL
Rules for classification: Tiebreakers
(C) Champions and W Champions Cup

==== Results summary ====
Overall								Home						Away					
Pld	W	D	L	GF	GA	GD	Pts	W	D	L	GF	GA	GD	W	D	L	GF	GA	GD
22	8	7	7	31	30	+1	31	4	2	5	16	15	+1	4	5	2	15	15	0

Last updated: October 15, 2023.
Source: NWSLsoccer.com

==== Results by matchday ====
Matchday	1	2	3	4	5	6	7	8	9	10	11	12	13	14	15	16	17	18	19	20	21	22
Stadium	H	A	H	H	A	H	H	A	A	H	A	A	H	A	H	A	H	A	A	H	A	H
Result	L	W	D	L	D	W	L	D	L	L	L	W	D	D	W	D	W	W	D	L	W	W
Position	9	6	7	7	9	6	8	9	10	11	11	10	9	11	10	10	9	7	8	9	8	5

Updated to match(es) played on October 15, 2023. Source: NWSL
A = Away; H = Home; W = Win; D = Draw; L = Loss

=== Playoffs ===
October 20, 2023 First round	OL Reign	1–0	Angel City FC	Seattle, Washington
7:00 pm PDT	Latsko 87'	Report		Stadium: Lumen Field; Attendance: 12,152; Referee: Brad Jensen

== Statistics ==
As of matches played October 20, 2023.

=== Goals ===
Pos.	No.	Nat.	Name	NWSL	Cup	Playoffs	Total
MF	9	(United States)	Savannah McCaskill	4	2	0	6
FW	10	(Scotland)	Claire Emslie	3	1	0	4
MF	21	(United States)	Alyssa Thompson	4	0	0	4
FW	18	(Japan)	Jun Endo	3	0	0	3
FW	35	(Mexico)	Katie Johnson	3	0	0	3
FW	29	(France)	Clarisse Le Bihan	1	2	0	3
DF	9	(United States)	M.A. Vignola	3	0	0	3
FW	15	(Mexico)	Scarlett Camberos	1	1	0	2
MF	99	(United States)	Madison Hammond	1	1	0	2
FW	2	(United States)	Sydney Leroux	2	0	0	2
MF	8	(United States)	Julie Ertz	1	0	0	1
DF	14	(United States)	Paige Nielsen	1	0	0	1
DF	5	(New Zealand)	Ali Riley	1	0	0	1
FW	3	(United States)	Jasmyne Spencer	1	0	0	1
Own goals				3	0	0	3
Total				32	7	0	39

=== Assists ===
Pos.	No.	Nat.	Name	NWSL	Cup	Playoffs	Total
FW	15	(Mexico)	Scarlett Camberos	3	2	0	5
FW	10	(Scotland)	Claire Emslie	5	0	0	5
FW	29	(France)	Clarisse Le Bihan	2	0	0	4
MF	9	(United States)	Savannah McCaskill	3	0	0	3
FW	18	(Japan)	Jun Endo	2	0	0	2
FW	21	(United States)	Alyssa Thompson	2	0	0	2
MF	99	(United States)	Madison Hammond	1	0	0	1
FW	35	(Mexico)	Katie Johnson	1	0	0	1
FW	2	(United States)	Sydney Leroux	1	0	0	1
DF	14	(United States)	Paige Nielsen	0	1	0	1
FW	3	(United States)	Jasmyne Spencer	0	1	0	1
DF	9	(United States)	M.A. Vignola	1	0	0	1
MF	17	(United States)	Dani Weatherholt	1	0	0	1
Total				22	4	0	28

=== Clean sheets ===
Pos.	No.	Nat.	Name	NWSL	Cup	Playoffs	Total
GK	13	(Bosnia and Herzegovina)	DiDi Haračić	3	0	0	3
GK	19	(United States)	Angelina Anderson	1	0	0	1
GK	1	(United States)	Brittany Isenhour	0	1	0	1
Total				4	1	0	5

=== Disciplinary cards ===
Player				NWSL		Cup		Playoffs		Total	
Pos.	No.	Nat.	Name	Yellow card	Red card	Yellow card	Red card	Yellow card	Red card	Yellow card	Red card
MF	9	(United States)	Savannah McCaskill	3	0	1	0	1	0	5	0
FW	33	(Mexico)	Katie Johnson	3	0	1	0	0	0	4	0
DF	99	(United States)	Madison Hammond	3	0	0	0	0	0	3	0
GK	13	(Bosnia and Herzegovina)	DiDi Haračić	3	0	0	0	0	0	3	0
DF	14	(United States)	Paige Nielsen	3	0	0	0	0	0	3	0
DF	5	(New Zealand)	Ali Riley	3	0	0	0	0	0	3	0
DF	11	(United States)	Sarah Gorden	1	0	1	0	0	0	2	0
MF	29	(France)	Clarisse Le Bihan	2	0	0	0	0	0	2	0
DF	3	(United States)	Jasmyne Spencer	1	0	1	0	0	0	2	0
DF	16	(United States)	M.A. Vignola	2	0	0	0	0	0	2	0
MF	17	(United States)	Dani Weatherholt	2	0	0	0	0	0	2	0
MF	8	(United States)	Julie Ertz	1	0	0	0	0	0	1	0
MF	28	(United States)	Lily Nabet	1	0	0	0	0	0	1	0
MF	24	(United States)	Mackenzie Pluck	0	0	1	0	0	0	1	0
FW	21	(United States)	Alyssa Thompson	1	0	0	0	0	0	1	0
Total				29	0	5	0	1	0	35	0

== Awards ==
=== NWSL monthly awards ===
==== Player of the Month ====
Month	Player of the Month	Statline	Ref.
July	Savannah McCaskill	Scored three goals in three matches, leading the team to a 2-0-1 record	
September/ October	Savannah McCaskill (2)	Scored two goals and one assist in five matches, leading the team to their first playoffs appearance	

==== Best XI of the Month ====
Month	Pos.	Nat.	Player	Ref.
June	DF	(United States) USA	M.A. Vignola	
July	DF	(United States) USA	Sarah Gorden	
July	MF	(United States) USA	Savannah McCaskill	
September/ October	DF	(United States) USA	M.A. Vignola (2)	
September/ October	DF	(United States) USA	Sarah Gorden (2)	
September/ October	MF	(United States) USA	Savannah McCaskill (2)	

=== Rookie of the Month ===
Month	Rookie of the Month		Statline	Ref.
March/April	(United States)	Alyssa Thompson	Scored 11' into debut; 2G in 6 matches	

=== NWSL weekly awards ===
As of July 3, 2023.

==== Player of the Week ====
Wk.	Nat.	Player	Won	Ref.
1	(United States)	Alyssa Thompson	Nom.	
3	(United States)	Savannah McCaskill	Nom.	
6	(Japan)	Jun Endo	2nd	
10	(United States)	Sydney Leroux	Won	
12	(United States)	M.A. Vignola	Nom.	
15	(United States)	Savannah McCaskill	Nom.	

==== Save of the Week ====
Wk.	Nat.	Player	Won	Ref.
8	(Bosnia and Herzegovina)	DiDi Haračić	Nom.	
11	(Bosnia and Herzegovina)	DiDi Haračić	Nom.	
12	(Bosnia and Herzegovina)	DiDi Haračić	Nom.	
14	(Bosnia and Herzegovina)	DiDi Haračić	2nd	
17	(United States)	Angelina Anderson	Won	
18	(Bosnia and Herzegovina)	DiDi Haračić	Nom.	
20	(Bosnia and Herzegovina)	DiDi Haračić	Nom.	
21	(United States)	Angelina Anderson	Won	
22	(Bosnia and Herzegovina)	DiDi Haračić	Nom.	
