= 2022 Angel City FC season =

Angel City FC
2022 season
- Owner: Natalie Portman; Julie Uhrman; Kara Nortman; Alexis Ohanian
- General manager: Angela Hucles Mangano (since Aug 15)
- Head coach: Freya Coombe
- Stadium: Banc of California Stadium; Los Angeles (Capacity: 22,000)
- NWSL: 8th
- Challenge Cup: Group stage
- Playoffs: DNQ
- Top goalscorer: League: Savannah McCaskill (6); All: Savannah McCaskill (7)
- Highest home attendance: 22,000 (4 times)
- Lowest home attendance: 16,112 (Sep 21 vs. WAS)
- Average home league attendance: 19,104
- Biggest win: 2–1 (Apr 29 vs. NC)
- Biggest defeat: 0–3 (Jun 3 vs. POR)
colors	colors

The 2022 Angel City FC season was the team's inaugural season as a professional women's soccer team. Angel City FC plays in the National Women's Soccer League (NWSL), the top tier of women's soccer in the United States.

== Team ==
=== Management and staff ===
On August 15, 2022, Angel City FC promoted vice president of player development and operations Angela Hucles to general manager, taking on some of the roles previously held by sporting director Eniola Aluko.

As of August 15, 2022.

Executive
President	Julie Uhrman
Sporting director	Eniola Aluko
General manager	Angela Hucles Mangano
Director of scouting and analytics	Kim McCauley
Coaching
Head coach	Freya Coombe
Assistant head coach and performance director	Robert Udberg
Goalkeeping coach	Daniel Ball

=== Roster ===
As of September 19, 2022.

No.	Pos.	Nation	Player
1	GK	USA	Brittany Isenhour
2	FW	USA	Sydney Leroux
3	FW	USA	Jasmyne Spencer
5	DF	NZL	Ali Riley (Captain)
6	DF	USA	Megan Reid
7	FW	USA	Simone Charley
8	MF	USA	Cari Roccaro
9	MF	USA	Savannah McCaskill
10	FW	SCO	Claire Emslie
11	DF	USA	Sarah Gorden
13	GK	BIH	DiDi Haračić
14	DF	USA	Paige Nielsen
16	DF	USA	Mary Alice Vignola
17	MF	USA	Dani Weatherholt
18	FW	JPN	Jun Endo
19	MF	USA	Katie Cousins
20	FW	USA	Tyler Lussi
21	MF	BRA	Stefany Ferrer Van Ginkel
23	FW	USA	Christen Press
25	DF	JAM	Allyson Swaby
26	MF	USA	Hope Breslin
28	MF	USA	Lily Nabet
29	MF	FRA	Clarisse Le Bihan
35	MF	ENG	Miri Taylor
99	DF	USA	Madison Hammond

==== On loan ====
No.	Pos.	Player	Nation	Destination club	Notes	Ref.
24	GK	Maia Pérez	(United States)	(France) GPSO 92 Issy	On loan for one year.	
4	DF	Vanessa Gilles	(Canada)	(France) Olympique Lyon	On loan until June 30, 2023.	

== Player statistics ==
As of August 28, 2022.

Angel City has used a total of 23 players during the 2022 season, and there have been 9 different goal scorers. There have also been five squad members who have not made a first-team appearance in the campaign: three goalkeepers, Sarah Gorden and MA Vignola, who have long term injuries.

The team has scored a total of 25 goals in all competitions. Savannah McCaskill with 7 goals, is the highest scorer, followed by Christen Press and Cari Roccaro with 4 goals each.

Key

- No. = Squad number
- Pos = Playing position
- Nat. = Nationality
- Apps = Appearances
- GK = Goalkeeper
- DF = Defender
- MF = Midfielder
- FW = Forward
- = Yellow cards
- = Red cards

Numbers under APPS indicate starts, and numbers in parentheses denote appearances as substitute.

Player statistics
No.	Pos.	Nat.	Name	Challenge Cup		NWSL		Total		Discipline	
No.	Pos.	Nat.	Name	Apps	Goals	Apps	Goals	Apps	Goals	A yellow rectangular card	A red rectangular card
2	FW	(United States)	Sydney Leroux	0	0	2 (1)	0	2 (1)	0	0	0
3	DF	(United States)	Jasmyne Spencer	6	0	5 (4)	0	11 (4)	0	1	0
4	DF	(Canada)	Vanessa Gilles	6	0	7	1	13	1	1	0
5	DF	(New Zealand)	Ali Riley	6	0	13 (1)	2	19 (1)	2	0	0
6	DF	(United States)	Megan Reid	2	0	16	0	18	0	1	0
7	DF	(United States)	Simone Charley	2 (1)	1	8 (6)	0	10 (7)	1	2	0
8	MF	(United States)	Cari Roccaro	6	0	14 (1)	4	20 (1)	4	4	0
9	MF	(United States)	Savannah McCaskill	5	1	15	6	20	7	4	1
10	FW	(Scotland)	Claire Emslie	0	0	4 (1)	2	4 (1)	2	0	0
13	GK	(Bosnia and Herzegovina)	DiDi Haračić	6	0	16	0	22	0	1	0
14	DF	(United States)	Paige Nielsen	2	0	8 (6)	0	10 (6)	0	4	0
17	MF	(United States)	Dani Weatherholt	6	0	14	0	20	0	1	0
18	FW	(Japan)	Jun Endo	6	0	16	1	22	1	1	0
19	MF	(United States)	Katie Cousins	0	0	0 (1)	0	0 (1)	0	0	0
20	DF	(United States)	Tyler Lussi	5 (1)	1	15	0	20 (1)	1	5	1
21	MF	(Brazil)	Stefany Ferrer Van Ginkel	0 (2)	0	0 (2)	0	0 (4)	0	0	0
23	FW	(United States)	Christen Press	5	2	8	2	13	4	1	0
25	DF	(Jamaica)	Allyson Swaby	1 (1)	0	0 (1)	0	1 (2)	0	0	0
26	MF	(United States)	Hope Breslin	0 (5)	0	0 (7)	0	0 (12)	0	1	0
28	MF	(United States)	Lily Nabet	0 (2)	0	2 (5)	0	2 (7)	0	0	0
29	MF	(France)	Clarisse Le Bihan	0	0	5 (9)	0	5 (9)	0	2	0
35	MF	(England)	Miri Taylor	0 (1)	0	5 (4)	0	5 (5)	0	0	0
99	DF	(United States)	Madison Hammond	4 (2)	0	3 (4)	0	7 (6)	0	0	0

== Competitions ==
Win Tie Loss

All times are in PT unless otherwise noted.

=== NWSL regular season ===
April 29 1	Angel City FC	2–1	North Carolina Courage	Los Angeles
19:30	Gilles 3' (yellow card) 39'; Endo 13'	Report	Gray (yellow card) 33'; Debinha 51'; Baucom (yellow card) 85'; Kerolin (yellow card) 88'	Stadium: Banc of California Stadium; Attendance: 22,000; Referee: Samantha Martinez

May 8 2	Angel City FC	0–1	Orlando Pride	Los Angeles
17:00 PDT	Reid (yellow card) 25'	Report	Leroux 3' (yellow card) 68'; Montefusco (yellow card) 33'; Abello (yellow card) 89'	Stadium: Banc of California Stadium; Attendance: 17,510; Referee: Adorae Monroy

May 15 3	Washington Spirit	0–1	Angel City FC	Washington, D.C.
17:00 EDT	Roddar (yellow card) 45+1'	Report	Press 42' (Gilles) (yellow card) 77'; Breslin (yellow card) 90+6'	Stadium: Audi Field; Attendance: 7,433; Referee: Anya Voigt

May 21 4	Angel City FC	1–0	Kansas City Current	Los Angeles
19:30 PDT	McCaskill (yellow card) 11'; Charley (yellow card) 30'; Leach 70' (o.g.)	Report	Pickett (yellow card) 64'; Ball (yellow card) 90+1'	Stadium: Banc of California Stadium; Attendance: 18,514; Referee: Ricardo Fierro

May 29 5	Angel City FC	0–1	NJ/NY Gotham FC	Los Angeles
17:00 PDT		Report	Dorsey (yellow card) 13'; Mewis (yellow card) 18'; Purce (yellow card) 45+2'; Onumonu 57' (Purce)	Stadium: Banc of California Stadium; Attendance: 18,784; Referee: Malik Badawi

June 3 6	Portland Thorns FC	3–0	Angel City FC	Portland, Oregon
19:30 PDT	Hubly; Sinclair 18' (Sugita), 68' (Beckie); Smith (yellow card) 22'	Report		Stadium: Providence Park; Attendance: 14,493; Referee: Elton Garcia

June 7 7	Angel City FC	0–0	Houston Dash	Los Angeles
19:00 PDT		Report	Hanson (yellow card) 58'	Stadium: Banc of California Stadium; Attendance: 16,739; Referee: Danielle Chesky

June 11 8	Racing Louisville FC	2–3	Angel City FC	Louisville, Kentucky
20:00 EDT	Bonner (yellow card) 24', (goal) 29' (DeMelo); Nadim 65' (pen.), (yellow card) 85'; Howell (yellow card) 74'; Lund (yellow card) 90+2'	Report	Nielsen (yellow card) 19'; Press 36' (Reid); McCaskill 47' (Press), 90+3' (pen.), (yellow card) 49'; Le Bihan (yellow card) 68'	Stadium: Lynn Family Stadium; Attendance: 6,139; Referee: Matthew Thompson

June 18 9	OL Reign	1–0	Angel City FC	Seattle
19:00 PDT	Quinn (yellow card) 26'; Balcer 31', (yellow card) 61'; Latsko (yellow card) 51'; Rapinoe (yellow card) 58' (yellow-red card) 74'	Report	Lussi (yellow card) 50'; McCaskill (yellow card) 72'; Nielsen (yellow card) 73'	Stadium: Lumen Field; Attendance: 6,367; Referee: Karen Callado

July 1 10	Angel City FC	1–1	Portland Thorns FC	Los Angeles
19:30 PDT	McCaskill 2'; Le Bihan (yellow card) 87'	Report	Coffey (yellow card) 88'; Pogarch (yellow card) 88'; Beckman (yellow card) 90'; Ryan 90+6' (Pogarch)	Stadium: Banc of California Stadium; Attendance: 17,492; Referee: Adorae Monroy

July 9 11	Angel City FC	2–1	San Diego Wave FC	Los Angeles
19:30 PDT	Riley 9' (Endo); Lussi (yellow card) 22' (yellow-red card) 79'; Nielsen (yellow card) 75'; Emslie 81' (Roccaro)	Report	McNabb 59' (Johnson)	Stadium: Banc of California Stadium; Attendance: 22,000; Referee: Brad Jensen

July 30 13	Angel City FC	2–3	OL Reign	Los Angeles
19:30 PDT	Roccaro 9'; McCaskill 28' (pen.), (yellow card) 56'	Report	Cook (yellow card) 27'; Fishlock 54' (King); Huerta 64'; Heath 89' (Huerta)	Stadium: Banc of California Stadium; Attendance: 22,000; Referee: Katja Koroleva

August 7 14	Orlando Pride	2–2	Angel City FC	Orlando, Florida
19:00 EDT	Pressley (yellow card) 57'; Tymrak (yellow card) 58'; Doyle 64'; Nielsen 90+1' (o.g.); Cluff (yellow card) 90+6'	Report	Riley 40'; Roccaro 72' (Nielsen), (yellow card) 76'	Stadium: Exploria Stadium; Attendance: 4,904; Referee: Matt Thompson

August 14 15	Angel City FC	1–0	Chicago Red Stars	Los Angeles
17:00 PDT	McCaskill 48'; Lussi (yellow card) 54'	Report		Stadium: Banc of California Stadium; Attendance: 17,002; Referee: Mark Allatin

August 19 16	Kansas City Current	1–1	Angel City FC	Kansas City, Kansas
19:00 CDT	Del Fava (yellow card) 62'; LaBonta 82' (pen.)	Report	Roccaro (yellow card) 28', (goal) 78' (Ali Riley); Lussi (yellow card) 76'; Nielsen (yellow card) 81'; Weatherholt (yellow card) 88'	Stadium: Children's Mercy Park; Attendance: 10,395; Referee: Ricardo Fierro

August 28 17	NJ/NY Gotham FC	1–3	Angel City FC	Harrison, New Jersey
17:00 EDT	Freeman (yellow card) 36'; Monaghan 52'	Report	McCaskill 16'; Roccaro 25'; Emslie 31'; Haračić (yellow card) 72'	Stadium: Red Bull Arena; Attendance: 6,796; Referee: Brandon Stevis

September 11 18	Houston Dash	1–1	Angel City FC	Houston, Texas
18:00 CDT	Sánchez 43' (Jacobs); Prince (yellow card) 69'	Report	Charley 49'	Stadium: PNC Stadium; Attendance: 5,927

September 14 12	North Carolina Courage	1–0	Angel City FC	Cary, North Carolina
19:30 EDT	Kerolin 54' (Debinha); Pinto (yellow card) 58'	Report	Lussi (yellow card) 5'	Stadium: Sahlen's Stadium; Attendance: 3,661; Referee: Alex Billeter
Note: Rescheduled from July 15 due to league COVID-19 protocols.

September 17 19	San Diego Wave FC	1–0	Angel City FC	San Diego
19:00 PDT	Shaw 30' (Jakobsson); Turnbow (yellow card) 58'; van Egmond (yellow card) 82'	Report		Stadium: Snapdragon Stadium; Attendance: 32,000

September 21 20	Angel City FC	2–1	Washington Spirit	Los Angeles
19:30 PDT	Emslie 39' (Riley); Charley 51' (Spencer)	Report	Hatch 88' (pen.); Rodman (yellow card) 90+4'	Stadium: Banc of California Stadium; Attendance: 16,112

September 25 21	Angel City FC	1–3	Racing Louisville FC	Los Angeles
17:00 PDT	McCaskill 14' (Endo)	Report	Davis 37' (Howell); Lester (yellow card) 40'; Chidiac 43' (pen.); McDonald (yellow card) 75'; Murray (yellow card) 82'; Ekic 90' (Fox)	Stadium: Banc of California Stadium; Attendance: 22,000

October 2 22	Chicago Red Stars	2–0	Angel City FC	Bridgeview, Illinois
17:00 CDT	Pugh 45+4' (Luebbert); Colaprico (yellow card) 64'; Nagasato 77' (DiBernardo)	Report	Reid (yellow card) 68'; Le Bihan (yellow card) 74'	Stadium: SeatGeek Stadium; Attendance: 8,347; Referee: Kevin Broadley

==== Regular-season standings ====
Pos	Team	Pld	W	D	L	GF	GA	GD	Pts	Qualification
1	OL Reign	22	11	7	4	32	19	+13	40	NWSL Shield, Playoffs – semi-finals
2	Portland Thorns FC (C)	22	10	9	3	49	24	+25	39	Playoffs – semi-finals
3	San Diego Wave FC	22	10	6	6	32	21	+11	36	Playoffs – first round
4	Houston Dash	22	10	6	6	35	27	+8	36	Playoffs – first round
5	Kansas City Current	22	10	6	6	29	29	0	36	Playoffs – first round
6	Chicago Red Stars	22	9	6	7	34	28	+6	33	Playoffs – first round
7	North Carolina Courage	22	9	5	8	46	33	+13	32	
8	Angel City FC	22	8	5	9	23	27	−4	29	
9	Racing Louisville FC	22	5	8	9	23	35	−12	23	
10	Orlando Pride	22	5	7	10	22	45	−23	22	
11	Washington Spirit	22	3	10	9	26	33	−7	19	
12	NJ/NY Gotham FC	22	4	1	17	16	46	−30	13	

Source: NWSL
Rules for classification: Tiebreakers
(C) Champions

===== Results summary =====
Overall								Home						Away					
Pld	W	D	L	GF	GA	GD	Pts	W	D	L	GF	GA	GD	W	D	L	GF	GA	GD
22	8	5	9	23	27	−4	29	5	2	4	12	12	0	3	3	5	11	15	−4

Last updated: October 2, 2022.
Source: NWSLsoccer.com

===== Results by matchday =====
Matchday	1	2	3	4	5	6	7	8	9	10	11	12	13	14	15	16	17	18	19	20	21	22
Stadium	H	H	A	H	H	A	H	A	A	H	H	H	A	H	A	A	A	A	A	H	H	A
Result	W	L	W	W	L	L	D	W	L	D	W	L	D	W	D	W	D	L	L	W	L	L
Position (Note: LA's position at the end of the day on which their match was played.)	1	6	2	2	2	5	4	6	6	6	5	7	7	7	7	7	7	7	7	7	8	8

Updated to match(es) played on October 2, 2022. Source: NWSL
A = Away; H = Home; W = Win; D = Draw; L = Loss

=== NWSL playoffs ===
Angel City FC finished the regular season in eighth place and did not qualify for the NWSL playoffs.

=== NWSL Challenge Cup ===
==== Group stage ====
March 19	Angel City FC	1–1	San Diego Wave FC	Fullerton, California
21:00 EDT	McCaskill 49'; Roccaro (yellow card) 82'	Report	McNabb (yellow card) 45+4'; Turnbow (yellow card) 57'; McGrady (yellow card) 72'; Riehl 82'	Stadium: Titan Stadium; Attendance: 6,307; Referee: Elvis Osmanovic

March 26	Angel City FC	1–3	OL Reign	Fullerton, California
16:00 EDT	McCaskill (red card) 31'; Lussi 67'	Report	Latsko 12'; Cook 18'; Angelina 50'; Barnes (yellow card) 90+1'	Stadium: Titan Stadium; Attendance: 4,156; Referee: Katja Koroleva

March 30	Portland Thorns FC	3–0	Angel City FC	Portland, Oregon
22:00 ET	S. Smith 31'; Ryan 53'; Weaver 78'	Report		Stadium: Providence Park; Attendance: 9,902; Referee: Mark Allatin

April 2	San Diego Wave FC	4–2	Angel City FC	San Diego, California
16:00 ET	Taylor 19' (yellow card) 26'; Morgan 45+3', 72' (yellow card) 73'; McGrady (yellow card) 65'; Ali 81'	Report	McGrady 38' (o.g.); Spencer (yellow card) 45+2'; Press 59'	Stadium: Torero Stadium; Attendance: 5,158; Referee: Brad Jensen

April 17	OL Reign	2–1	Angel City FC	Seattle, Washington
18:00 ET	Balcer 34'; Van der Jagt 90+4'	Report	Charley 83'	Stadium: Lumen Field; Attendance: 5,660; Referee: Brandon Stevis

April 24	Angel City FC	1–0	Portland Thorns FC	Fullerton, California
21:00 ET	Press 29' (pen.); Roccaro (yellow card) 37'; Charley (yellow card) 81'	Report	Rodriguez (yellow card) 28'; Kuikka (yellow card) 90+7'	Stadium: Titan Stadium; Attendance: 4,524; Referee: John Griggs

===== Divisional standings =====
Pos	Team	Pld	W	T	L	GF	GA	GD	Pts	Qualification	RGN	POR	SD	LA
1	OL Reign	6	4	2	0	11	5	+6	14	Advance to knockout stage	—	1–1	3–1	2–1
2	Portland Thorns FC	6	3	1	2	8	5	+3	10		0–1	—	3–2	3–0
3	San Diego Wave FC	6	1	2	3	9	11	−2	5		1–1	0–1	—	4–2
4	Angel City FC	6	1	1	4	6	13	−7	4		1–3	1–0	1–1	—

Source: NWSL
Rules for classification: 1) Total points; 2) Total goal differential; 3) Total number of goals scored; 4) Head-to-head points record; 5) Head-to-head goal differential; 6) Head-to-head number of goals scored; 7) Fewest disciplinary points; 8) Drawing of lots

=== International club friendlies ===
On May 24, 2022, Angel City FC announced a two-year partnership with Liga MX Femenil club Tigres UANL of Monterrey, Mexico. The agreement included friendlies to be played between the clubs, with the first occurring on August 10, 2022, at the Banc of California Stadium in Los Angeles, and the second in 2023 at Estadio Universitario in Monterrey. TUDN announced it would stream the match via the ViX service, and the match was also scheduled to be televised in the Los Angeles area on Bally Sports SoCal.

On June 27, 2022, Angel City FC and the Federación Mexicana de Fútbol announced the Copa Angelina, an inaugural non-FIFA friendly match between the club and the Mexico women's national football team scheduled for Labor Day (September 5, 2022) in Los Angeles. The match was broadcast live on TUDN and Univision in the United States and Mexico. Mexico won the inaugural friendly 2–0.

August 10	Angel City FC	1–0	(Mexico) Tigres UANL	Los Angeles
19:00 PDT	McCaskill 79' (Lussi)	Report		Stadium: Banc of California Stadium

September 5 Copa Angelina	Angel City FC	0–2	Mexico	Los Angeles
18:00 PDT		Report	Reid 71' (o.g.); Camberos 76'	Stadium: Banc of California Stadium; Attendance: 17,754
Note: Non FIFA Friendly
