= Megan Reid =

Canadian soccer player (born 1996)

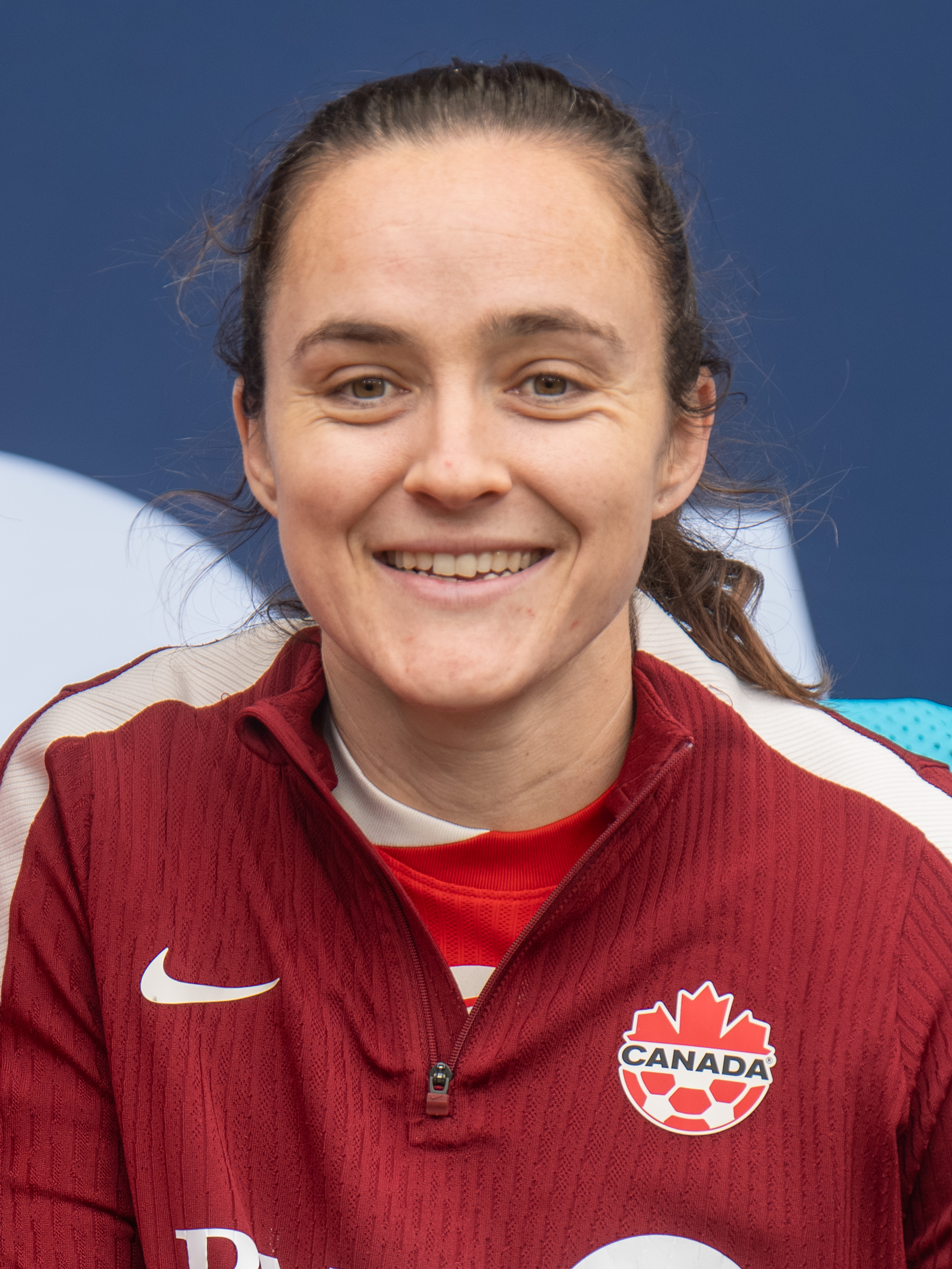
- Reid with Canada in 2026

Personal information
- Full name: Megan Elizbeth Reid
- Date of birth: July 8, 1996 (age 30)
- Place of birth: Orinda, California, U.S.
- Height: 5 ft 8 in (1.73 m)
- Position: Center back

Team information
- Current team: Denver Summit
- Number: 2

Youth career
- Lamorinda SC

College career
Years	Team	Apps	(Gls)
2014–2017	Virginia Cavaliers	83	(2)

Senior career*
Years	Team	Apps	(Gls)
2022–2025	Angel City	72	(0)
2026–	Denver Summit	13	(0)

International career^{‡}
2024–	Canada	3	(1)
- * Club domestic league appearances and goals as of 06:40, November 8, 2026 (UTC) ‡ National team caps and goals as of February 25, 2025

Megan Elizbeth Reid (born July 8, 1996) is a professional soccer player who plays as a center back for Denver Summit FC of the National Women's Soccer League (NWSL). Born in the United States, she plays for the Canada national team. Reid previously played for Angel City FC, where she was an iron woman in 2022.

== Early life and college career ==
Reid was born in Orinda, California, where she attended Miramonte High School and played club soccer for Lamorinda SC. She has a sister, Katie, and a brother, Danny.

Reid attended the University of Virginia, where she made 83 appearances and scored two goals. Her senior year, she started all 21 games, scored a golden goal at No. 2 West Virginia, and had two game-winning assists. Her performances earned her places on the All-ACC second team and the ACC Women's Soccer All-Academic team.

== Club career ==
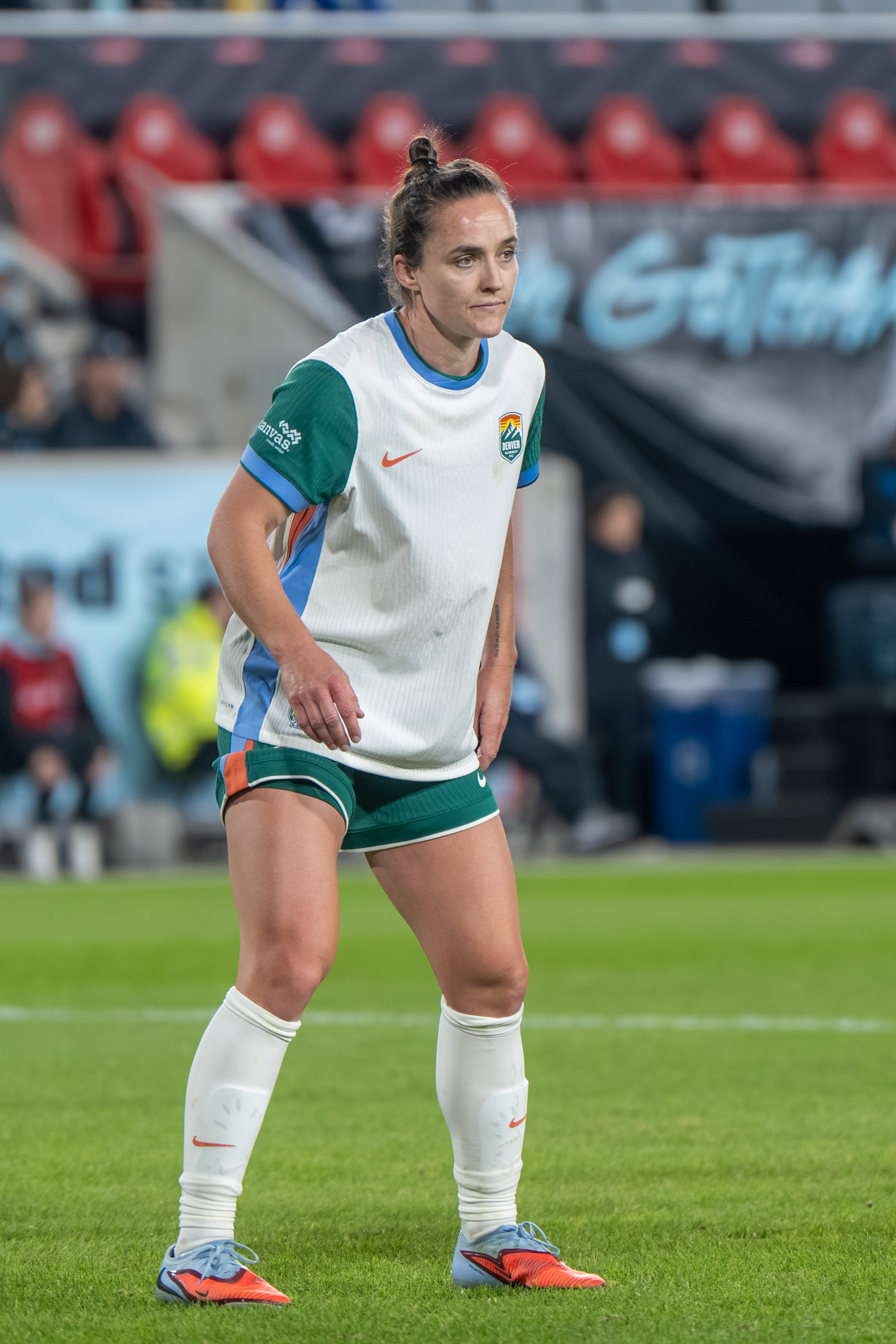
Reid with the Denver Summit in 2026

=== Early career ===
After losing her father, George, in her senior year of college, Reid declined to participate in the 2018 NWSL College Draft. Having talked about becoming a firefighter with her father before his passing, she decided to start volunteering at a local fire department in Virginia. She then moved back to the San Francisco Bay Area to pursue a career as an emergency medical technician. While interning as a paramedic, Reid and her coworkers often played pickup soccer inside the fire station, and she rediscovered her love for the sport.

Reid rejoined her old club team, Lamorinda SC, which had just entered the semipro WPSL, and played seven of the team's eight games. From there, the Lamorinda staff and her college coach, Steve Swanson, began looking for professional playing opportunities, and she landed a training spot with FC Thy-Thisted Q in the Danish Kvindaeligaen. After San Diego Wave FC placed her on their discovery list, she joined their preseason training camp, but did not make the roster. She then joined Angel City for their preseason on an invitation from Head Coach Freya Coombe and earned a professional contract.

=== Angel City FC ===
After missing the 2022 NWSL Challenge Cup due to a concussion, Reid made her professional debut for Angel City on April 17 during a 2–1 loss to OL Reign. She went on to play every minute of the club's inaugural season and was named the club's first Iron Woman. Angel City finished their first season in eighth place with a 8–9–5 record.

Reid returned with Angel City for the 2023 season and was a starting defender in eight of the nine games she played, playing a less significant role with the return of teammate Sarah Gorden from injury. Angel City finished in fifth place during the regular season and advanced to the playoffs for the first time where they were eliminated by OL Reign in the quarter final match.

On January 5, 2024, it was announced Angel City would re-sign Reid and extend her contract to 2025. On April 13, Reid played her first match of 2024 season against Chicago Red Stars to help Angel City clinch their first win and clean sheet of the season in a 0–1 victory. On August 18, Reid scored her first goal for Angel City in a friendly against Liga MX Femenil team FC Juárez which finished as a 7–0 win. Reid made her 50th NWSL regular-season appearance with Angel City on September 27, in a home match against Washington Spirit. Reid ultimately ended up recording a total of 72 appearances for the club before departing from Angel City at the end of 2025.

=== Denver Summit ===
On November 17, 2025, NWSL expansion team Denver Summit announced that they had signed Reid to a three-year contract.

== International career ==
Reid is eligible to play for the Canadian national team due to her mother being born in Canada. Reid received her first call-up to the Canada national team as a training player ahead of the 2024 CONCACAF W Gold Cup. On December 3, 2024, Reid earned her first cap in a 5–1 victory over South Korea. On February 25, 2025, she scored her first international goal in a 7-0 victory over Chinese Taipei in the 2025 Pinatar Cup.

== Career statistics ==
=== Club ===
As of September 7, 2025

Appearances and goals by club, season and competition
Club	Season	League			Playoffs (Note: Includes NWSL Playoffs)		Cup (Note: Includes the NWSL Challenge Cup)		Total	
Club	Season	Division	Apps	Goals	Apps	Goals	Apps	Goals	Apps	Goals
Angel City FC	2022	NWSL	22	0	—		2	0	24	0
Angel City FC	2023	NWSL	9	0	0	0	6	0	15	0
Angel City FC	2024	NWSL	23	0	—		4	0	27	0
Angel City FC	2025	NWSL	15	0	—		—		15	0
Career total			69	0	0	0	12	0	81	0

=== International ===
As of match played February 25, 2025

National team	Year	Apps	Goals
Canada	2024	1	0
Canada	2025	2	1
Total		3	1

==== International goals ====
No.	Date	Venue	Opponent	Score	Result	Competition
1.	February 25, 2025	Pinatar Arena, San Pedro del Pinatar, Spain	Chinese Taipei	5–0	7–0	2025 Pinatar Cup

== Honors ==
Canada

- Pinatar Cup: 2025

Individual

- All-ACC Second Team: 2017
- ACC All-Academic Team: 2017
