= Lily Nabet =

American professional soccer player (born 1999)

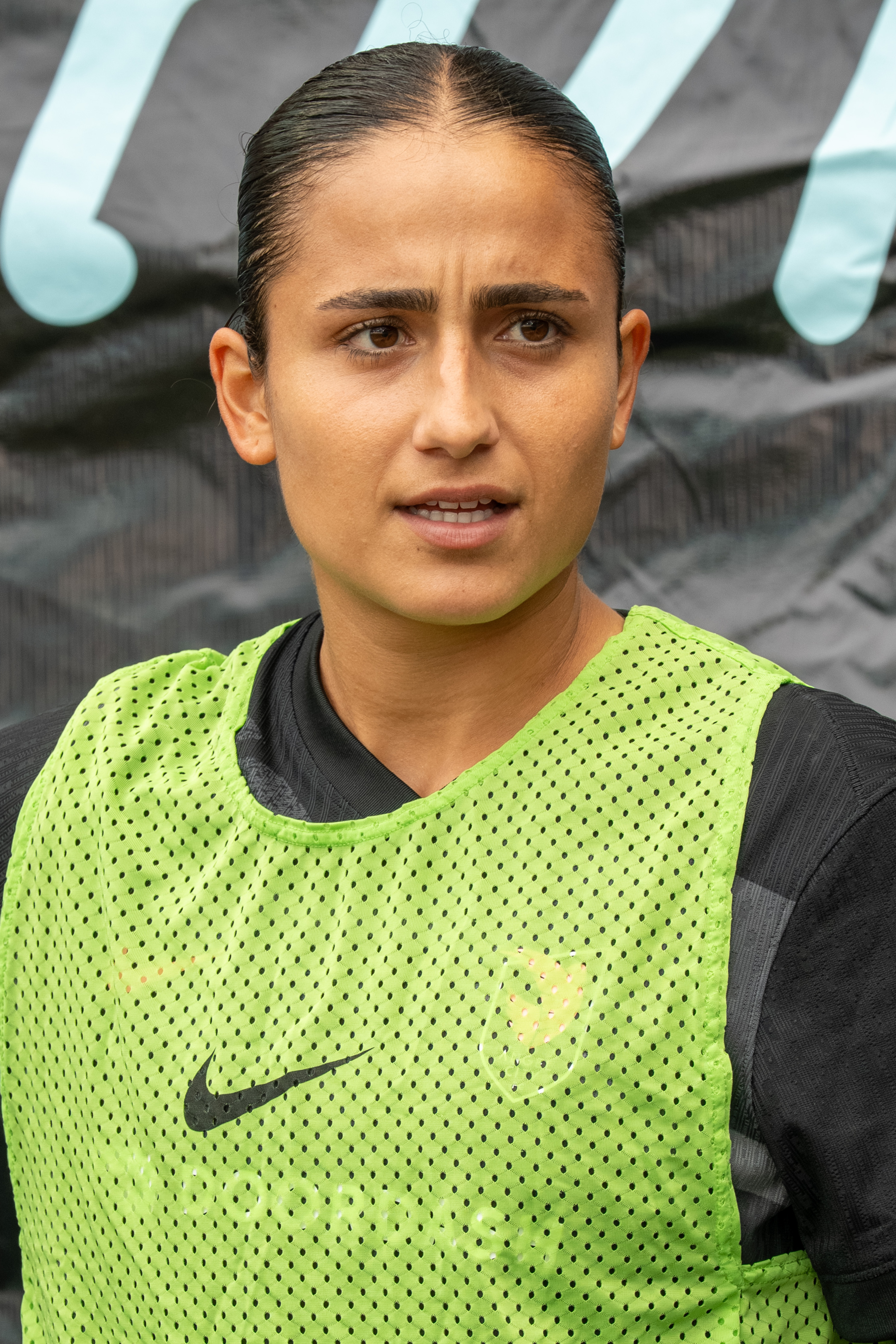
- Nabet with Angel City FC in 2025

Personal information
- Full name: Lily Shayan Nabet
- Date of birth: September 24, 1999 (age 27)
- Place of birth: Tarzana, California, U.S.
- Height: 5 ft 3 in (1.60 m)
- Position: Midfielder

Team information
- Current team: Carolina Ascent
- Number: 28

Youth career
- Real So Cal

College career
Years	Team	Apps	(Gls)
2017–2021	Duke Blue Devils	86	(2)

Senior career*
Years	Team	Apps	(Gls)
2022–2025	Angel City	35	(0)
2025	→ Fort Lauderdale United (loan)	9	(0)
2026–	Carolina Ascent	13	(1)
- * Club domestic league appearances and goals as of 17:28, June 4, 2026 (UTC)

Lily Shayan Nabet (born September 24, 1999) is an American professional soccer player who plays as a midfielder for USL Super League club Carolina Ascent. She played college soccer for the Duke Blue Devils and was selected by Angel City FC in the third round of the 2022 NWSL Draft.

== Early life ==
Nabet was born in Tarzana, California to David and Shadi Nabet who are from Iran, making her a first-generation Iranian American. She attended Chaminade College Preparatory School and played for Real So Cal, where she qualified for U15 and U16 regionals and scored three goals and one assist in her U18 season. She has two brothers, Amin and Matin.

== College career ==
Nabet attended Duke University, earning a degree in sociology. As a junior in 2019, she started all 20 matches and registered four assists. In her senior year, when she co-captained the team, the Blue Devils made it to the quarterfinals of the NCAA D1 women's soccer tournament. The following year, Nabet opted to use the extra year of eligibility granted by the NCAA due to the COVID-19 pandemic, pursuing a master's degree in business management at the Fuqua School of Business. In 2021, Nabet again co-captained the team, helping to lead them to the quarterfinals of the NCAA D1 women's soccer tournament.

== Club career ==
=== Angel City FC ===
Angel City FC selected Nabet in the third round of the 2022 NWSL Draft, 36th overall. She made her first appearance for Angel City on June 3, 2022, against the Portland Thorns. She got her first start on July 1, 2022, also against the Thorns. In total, she recorded 205 minutes in 10 matches. In 2022, she led the team in passing accuracy and pressure regains per 90.

On January 7, 2024, Angel City announced they had re-signed Nabet on a new contract keeping her at the club through the 2025 season. On April 13, 2024, Nabet made her first appearance of the 2024 season against the Chicago Red Stars, starting and playing 88 minutes, which ended as a 0–1 victory, the team's first win of the season.

==== Fort Lauderdale United ====
Starting on September 11, 2025, Nabet spent the remainder of her Angel City contract on loan at USL Super League club Fort Lauderdale United. She quickly became a starter, appearing in 9 matches and registering one assist. She was named to the USL Super League Team of the Month in November 2025 after posting strong defensive statistics. At the end of the calendar year, Nabet departed from Fort Lauderdale United.

=== Carolina Ascent ===
In January 2026, Nabet signed with fellow USL Super League club Carolina Ascent. She made her club debut on January 31, playing the entirety of a 1–0 loss to Sporting JAX to open the second half of Carolina's season.

== Career statistics ==
=== Club ===
As of January 6, 2026

Appearances and goals by club, season and competition
Club	Season	League			Cup (Note: Includes the NWSL Challenge Cup.)		Playoffs (Note: Includes NWSL Playoffs.)		Other		Total	
Club	Season	Division	Apps	Goals	Apps	Goals	Apps	Goals	Apps	Goals	Apps	Goals
Angel City FC	2022	NWSL	10	0	3	0	—		—		13	0
Angel City FC	2023	NWSL	11	0	6	0	0	0	—		17	0
Angel City FC	2024	NWSL	13	0	—		—		3 (Note: Includes NWSL x Liga MX Femenil Summer Cup.)	0	16	0
Angel City FC	2025	NWSL	1	0	—		—		0	0	1	0
Angel City FC	Total		35	0	9	0	0	0	3	0	47	0
Fort Lauderdale United FC (loan)	2025-26	USLS	9	0	—		—		—		9	0
Career total			44	0	9	0	0	0	3	0	56	0

== Honors ==
Individual

- ACC Academic Honor Roll: 2021
