= Ali Riley =

New Zealand footballer (born 1987)

Ali Riley MNZM
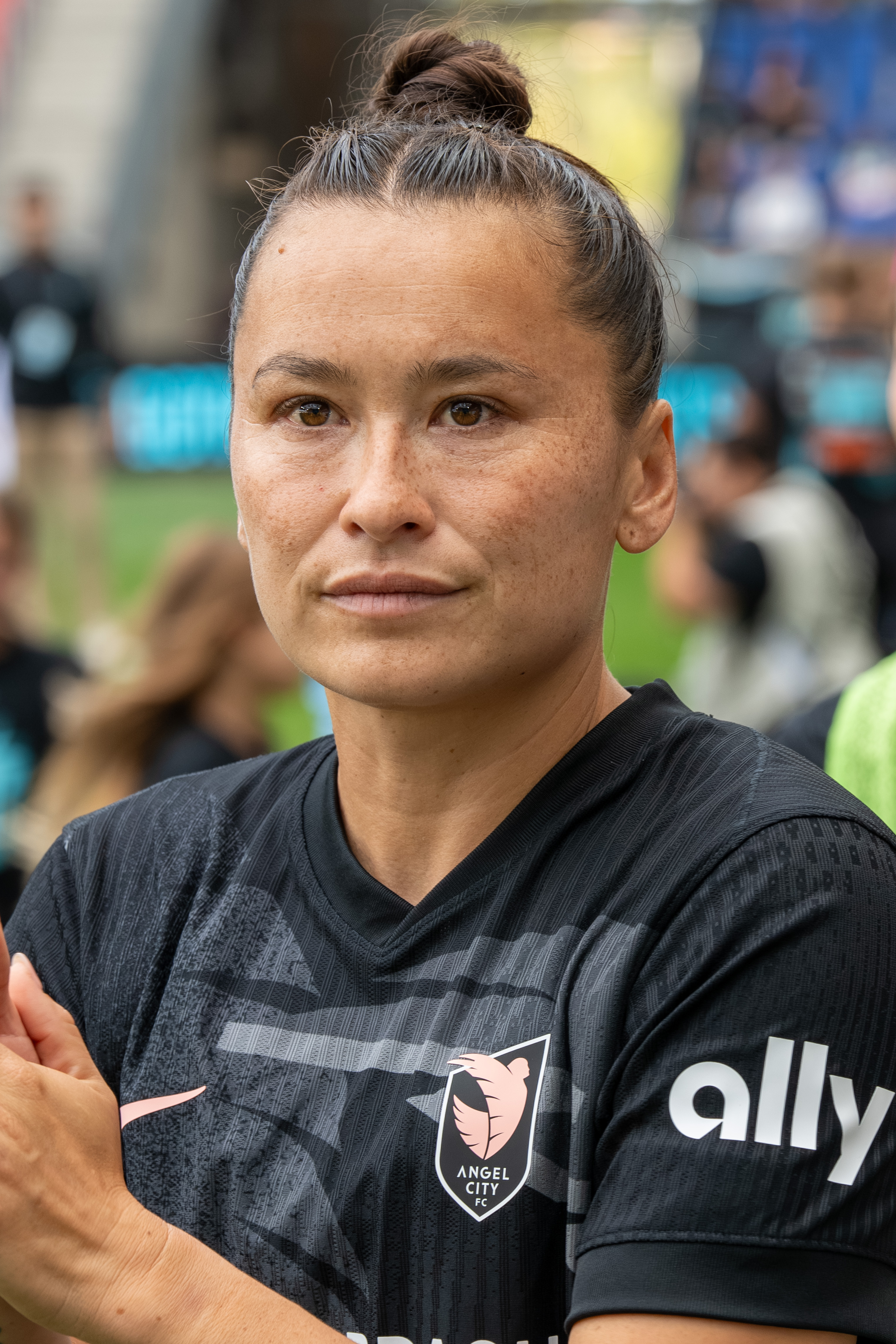
- Ali Riley with Angel City FC in 2025

Personal information
- Full name: Alexandra Lowe Riley
- Date of birth: 30 October 1987 (age 39)
- Place of birth: Los Angeles, California, U.S.
- Height: 1.64 m (5 ft 5 in)
- Position: Defender

Youth career
- 1998–2004: Westside Breakers
- 2004–2006: Real So Cal

College career
Years	Team	Apps	(Gls)
2006–2009	Stanford Cardinal	83	(7)

Senior career*
Years	Team	Apps	(Gls)
2009	Pali Blues	7	(0)
2010	FC Gold Pride	23	(0)
2011	Western New York Flash	15	(0)
2012–2018	Rosengård	132	(4)
2018–2019	Chelsea	9	(0)
2019–2020	Bayern Munich	3	(0)
2020–2021	Orlando Pride	20	(0)
2020	→ Rosengård (loan)	17	(1)
2022–2025	Angel City	45	(3)
Total		271	(8)

International career^{‡}
2006	New Zealand U20	11	(5)
2007–2025	New Zealand	163	(2)
- * Club domestic league appearances and goals as of 2 November 2025 ‡ National team caps and goals as of 19 February 2024

Alexandra Lowe Riley MNZM (born 30 October 1987) is a former professional footballer who played as a defender. Born in the United States, she represented the New Zealand national team. She captained both her club and national teams. As a collegiate athlete, she captained the Stanford soccer team to two NCAA semi-finals and one final.

== Early life ==
Born in Los Angeles, California to parents John Graham Riley and Beverly Fong Lowe, Riley attended St. Matthew's Parish School in Pacific Palisades and Harvard-Westlake School in North Hollywood, California. She was named captain of the soccer team during her senior season and was a two-time Mission League Offensive MVP as well as a two-time first-team San Fernando Valley selection. As a senior, she helped lead the Wolverines to the 2006 Southern Section Division I final and was named to the All-CIF Southern Section Division I first team. Riley also competed for local soccer clubs LA Breakers FC (formerly Westside Breakers) and Real SoCal (formerly SoCal United).

=== Stanford University ===
Riley attended Stanford University and played for the Stanford Cardinal from 2006 to 2009. During her freshman year, she started in fifteen of the eighteen matches she played. She played forward and scored four goals with two assists. As a sophomore, she played sixteen games and started in fourteen of them. She scored two goals and had two assists. During her junior year, Riley converted from her position at forward to an outside back and she has played almost exclusively at left or right full-back ever since, As a senior, Riley started in each of the twenty-four games and scored one goal with one assist.

== Club career ==
=== FC Gold Pride ===
In January 2010, Riley was selected as the tenth pick in the first round of the 2010 WPS Draft by FC Gold Pride. While she played on her natural right wing-back position for the NZ Women's National Team, she played professionally as a left wing-back and had three assists in the 2010 run to the WPS championship by FC Gold Pride. Riley won the WPS Rookie of the Year award.

=== Western New York Flash ===
Riley signed for Western New York Flash for the 2011 season, becoming a free agent after FC Gold Pride failed to find financial backers.

In the 2011 season Riley was a finalist for Defender of the year as the Flash swept both the league season title and then won the 2011 WPS Championship.

In 2012, Riley re-signed with Western New York Flash for the 2012 season, however, the league folded before play began.

=== LdB FC Malmö/FC Rosengård ===
With the suspension of the WPS, she signed in 2012 with LdB FC Malmö, the 2011 Damallsvenskan champions. In her first game (the Supercupen), she assisted on the winning goal. She played her first full season in the Damallsvenskan in 2013. With LdB FC Malmö she finished top of the table.

In September 2013 Riley re-signed with LdB FC Malmö (since December 2013 renamed FC Rosengård) for the 2014 and 2015 seasons. FC Rosengård again won gold in the Damallsvenskan in 2014.

In March 2015 she played both at full-back and forward in her second Supercupen victory with Rosengård. In September 2015 she re-signed with Rosengård. The team went on to win the Damallsvenskan for the third straight year, earning Riley her fifth league championship in her eight-year career.

=== Chelsea ===
On 26 June 2018, it was announced that Riley would be leaving Rosengård in July to join Chelsea in the English FA Women's Super League.

=== Bayern Munich ===
On 18 July 2019, Riley moved to Bayern Munich of the Frauen-Bundesliga.

=== Orlando Pride ===
On 10 February 2020, Ali Riley returned to the US and signed a one-year contract with an option for an additional year for the Orlando Pride. The season was postponed due to the coronavirus pandemic with the NWSL eventually scheduling a smaller schedule 2020 NWSL Challenge Cup tournament. However, on 22 June 2020, the team withdrew from the tournament following positive COVID-19 tests among both players and staff.

==== Loan to FC Rosengård ====
On 13 July 2020, having been unable to feature for the Pride, Riley returned to Sweden to be with her partner during the pandemic and rejoined Rosengård on loan.

=== Angel City FC, 2022–2025 ===
On 27 January 2022, Riley was traded to Angel City FC in exchange for $15,000 in allocation money and a third-round pick in the 2023 NWSL Draft. As a result of the trade, she was able to play in her hometown for the first time in her career. During the club's inaugural season, Riley was a starting defender in 19 of the 20 games she played and recorded 1,591 minutes on the pitch. The club finished their first season in eighth place with a 8–9–5 record.

During the 2023 season, Riley started 15 of the 19 games she played. She scored her first goal for the club during a 2–2 draw against Chicago Red Stars on 17 September. Angel City finished in fifth place during the regular season and advanced to the playoffs for the first time where they were eliminated by OL Reign in the quarter final match. Angel City announced on 22 August 2024 that Riley would be placed on the Season-Ending Injury (SEI) list due to a chronic and persistent leg injury that had kept her out for the majority of the 2024 season and forced her to miss the 2024 Olympics. Riley made her first appearance in a matchday squad since the injury during Angel City's 1–0 win against the Orlando Pride on 21 August 2025.

On 30 September 2025, Riley announced that she would retire from professional soccer at the end of the 2025 NWSL season.

== International career ==
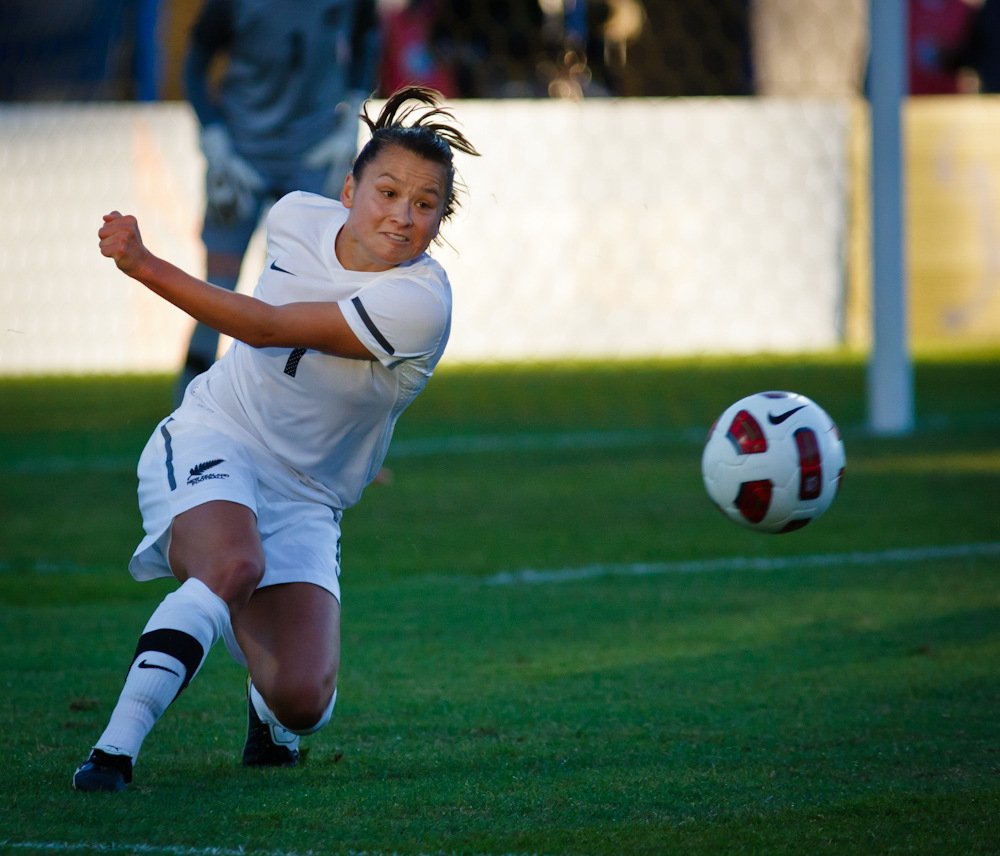
Riley playing for New Zealand in May 2011

Being US-born to a New Zealand father, Riley represented New Zealand at the 2006 Women's U-20 World Cup finals. She made her senior debut in a 5–0 loss to Australia on 6 February 2007, and represented New Zealand at the 2007 FIFA Women's World Cup in China, where they lost 5–0 to Brazil, 2–0 to Denmark and 2–0 to China.

Riley also played every minute for the New Zealand squad in the 2008 Summer Olympics where they drew with Japan (2–2) before losing to Norway (1–0) and the United States (4–0). Riley's first international goal was scored in the final of the OFC Women's Nations Cup as New Zealand qualified for the 2011 FIFA Women's World Cup with an 11–0 win over Papua New Guinea.

On 27 June 2011, Riley earned her 50th A-international cap in a 2–1 loss to Japan in New Zealand's opening group stage match at the 2011 FIFA Women's World Cup. In the final seconds of extra time in the match v. Mexico she assisted on the tying goal that gave the Football Ferns their first point in a World Cup group stage.

In the 2012 Olympics Riley played every minute of the Football Ferns' four games. In the preliminary round games the Ferns lost 1–0 to Great Britain and Brazil and beat Cameroon 3–1. This was the first victory by a NZ football team in the Olympics. With the victory the Ferns advanced to the second round based on goal differential. In the quarter-final the Ferns played the USA losing 2–0.

In 2013 Riley started for New Zealand in a series of games establishing the Football Ferns as a growing force in international competition. The Ferns won the Vallais Cup beating #4 Brazil 1–0 and #16 China 4–0 and also had ties playing #10 Australia, #3 Japan and #1 USA.

She featured in all New Zealand's three matches at the 2015 FIFA Women's World Cup in Canada.

In the 2016 Rio Olympics Riley played every minute of the Football Ferns' three games. The Ferns lost 2–0 to USA, 3–0 to France and beat Colombia 1–0.

Riley has been the captain of the Football Ferns since the 2017 Cyprus Cup.

In April 2019, Riley was named to the final 23-player squad for the 2019 FIFA Women's World Cup.

On 20 July 2023, Riley captained New Zealand in the country's first World Cup victory ever. In the opening game of the 2023 FIFA Women's World Cup, New Zealand beat Norway 1–0.

On July 4, 2024, Riley was initially named to the New Zealand 18-player squad for the 2024 Summer Olympics in Paris but had to withdraw on July 24, 2024, just days before the start of the competition due to injury.

== Other work ==
=== Media ===
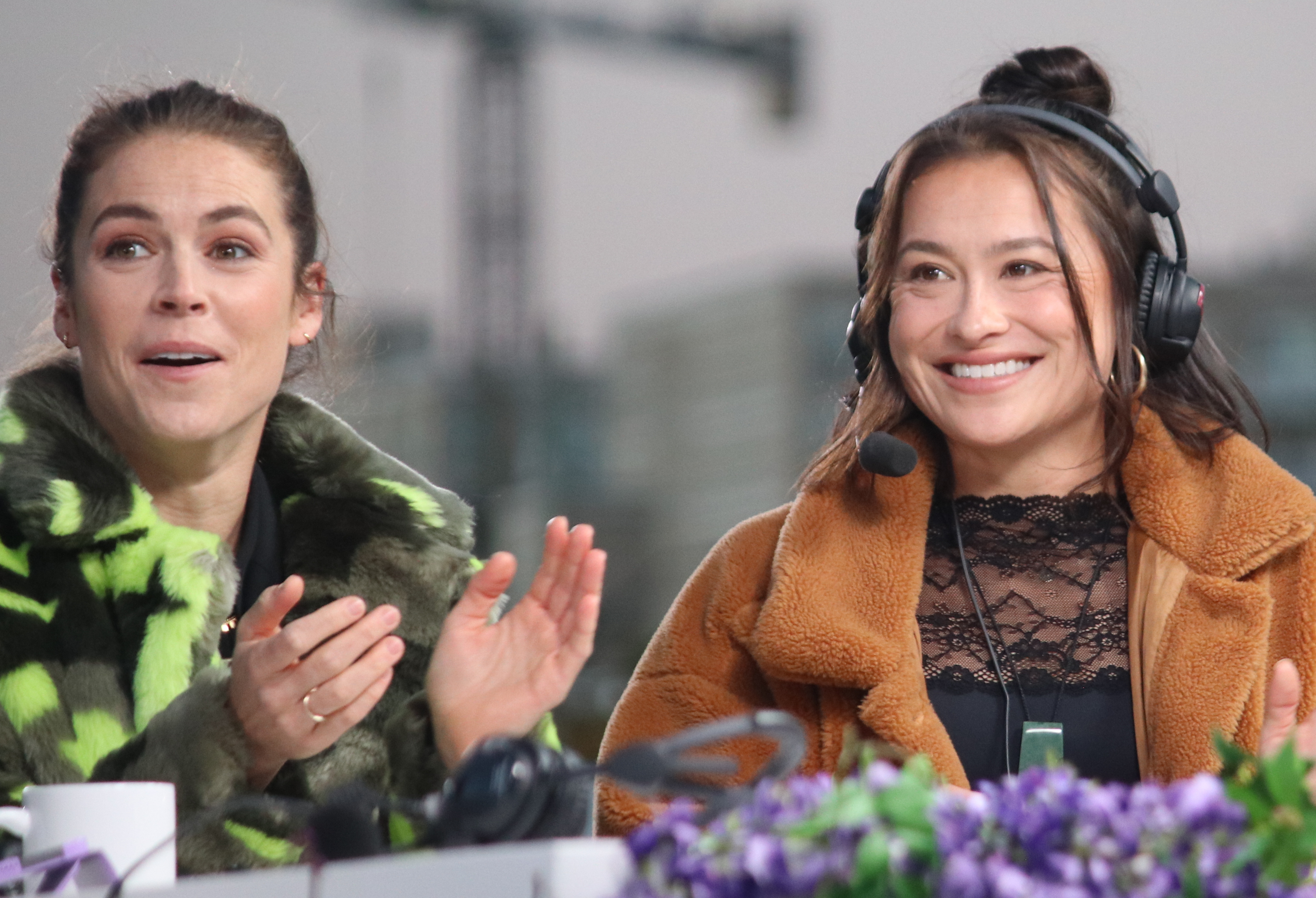
Kelley O'Hara and Riley host the Just Women's Sports pregame show before the 2022 NWSL Championship.

In 2021 Riley started hosting an Off the Ball show for sports website Just Women's Sports.

=== Books ===
In 2023, Riley released a cookbook featuring plant-based recipes titled Girls Gone Veg with her former Orlando Pride teammate Toni Pressley.

== Personal life ==
Riley is of Chinese descent. Her father John Riley is a native New Zealander and her mother Bev Lowe is Chinese-American. They first met when both worked with the RAND Corporation.

Riley eats a mostly plant based diet. She is a self-identified flexitarian (Or semi-vegetarian). She has a cooking show called Girls Gone Veg which she founded with fellow soccer player Toni Pressley.

Riley became engaged to her fiancé Lucas Warrer Nilsson in March 2024.

On January 8, 2025, Riley revealed on social media that her home had been destroyed in the Palisades Fire.

== Career statistics ==
=== Club ===
As of match played 2 November 2025.

Appearances and goals by club, season and competition
Club	Season	League			National Cup (Note: Includes the Svenska Cupen, FA Cup, DFB-Pokal, NWSL Challenge Cup)		Continental (Note: Includes the UEFA Champions League)		Other (Note: Includes the USL W-League playoffs, WPS playoffs, Svenska Supercupen, FA League Cup, NWSL Playoffs)		Total	
Club	Season	Division	Apps	Goals	Apps	Goals	Apps	Goals	Apps	Goals	Apps	Goals
Pali Blues	2009	USL W-League	7	0	—		—		3	0	10	0
FC Gold Pride	2010	WPS	23	0	—		—		1	0	24	0
Western New York Flash	2011	WPS	15	0	—		—		1	0	16	0
Western New York Flash	Total		45	0	—		—		5	0	50	0
Rosengård	2012	Damallsvenskan	19	0	1	0	5	0	1	0	26	0
Rosengård	2013	Damallsvenskan	20	1	—		3	0	—		23	1
Rosengård	2014	Damallsvenskan	19	1	—		6	0	—		25	1
Rosengård	2015	Damallsvenskan	21	1	5	0	6	0	1	0	33	1
Rosengård	2016	Damallsvenskan	22	0	4	0	6	0	1	0	33	0
Rosengård	2017	Damallsvenskan	21	1	5	0	4	0	—		30	1
Rosengård	2018	Damallsvenskan	10	0	5	0	—		—		15	0
Rosengård	Total		132	4	20	0	30	0	3	0	185	4
Chelsea	2018–19	FA WSL	9	0	1	0	2	0	4	2	16	2
Bayern Munich	2019–20	Bundesliga	3	0	1	0	3	0	—		7	0
Orlando Pride	2020 (Note: The 2020 Season ended up cancelled due to COVID-19 and Riley didn't take part in the NWSL Challenge Cup before leaving for Sweden)	NWSL	—		—		—		—		—	
Orlando Pride	2021	NWSL	20	0	4	0	—		—		24	0
Orlando Pride	Total		32	0	6	0	5	0	4	2	47	2
Rosengård (loan)	2020	Damallsvenskan	17	1	1	0	—		—		18	1
Angel City FC	2022	NWSL	20	2	6	0	—		—		26	2
Angel City FC	2023	NWSL	18	1	4	0	—		1	0	23	1
Angel City FC	2024	NWSL	5	0	—		—		—		5	0
Angel City FC	2025	NWSL	2	0	—		—		—		2	0
Angel City FC	Total		45	3	10	0	—		1	0	56	3
Career total			271	8	37	0	35	0	13	2	356	10

=== International goals ===
New Zealand score listed first, score column indicates score after each Riley goal.

International goals by date, venue, opponent, score, result and competition
No.	Date	Venue	Opponent	Score	Result	Competition	Ref.
1	8 October 2010	North Harbour Stadium, Auckland, New Zealand	Papua New Guinea	1–0	11–0	2010 OFC Championship	
2	6 September 2022	Titan Stadium, Fullerton	Philippines	2–1	2–1	Friendly	

== Honours ==
FC Gold Pride

- Women's Professional Soccer: 2010

Western New York Flash

- Women's Professional Soccer: 2011

FC Rosengård (formerly LdB FC Malmö)

- Damallsvenskan: 2013, 2014, 2015
- Svenska Supercupen: 2012, 2015, 2016
- Svenska Cupen: 2016, 2017, 2018

New Zealand

- OFC Women's Nations Cup: 2010, 2014, 2018

Individual

- Nike Junior Women's Player of the Year 2006
- Nike National Women's Player of the Year 2006, 2008, 2009, 2010, 2011
- Oceania Football Confederation Women's Player of the Year 2009, 2010
- FIFPRO World XI short-list (55 players): 2016, 2017
- IFFHS OFC Woman Team of the Decade 2011–2020
- WPS Rookie of the Year: 2010
- WPS All Pro selection (First XI): 2010, 2011
- Damallsvenskan All Star Selection (First XI): 2013, 2014, 2015, 2016, 2017
- All-Pac-10 freshman first team: 2006
- TopDrawerSoccer.com Team of the Season: 2009
- All-Pacific Region first team: 2009
- All-Pac-10 first team: 2009
- Pac-10 women's soccer Scholar-Athlete of the Year: 2009
- Stanford University, Pat Strathairn Best Competitive Athlete Award: 2010

Orders

- Member of the New Zealand Order of Merit: 2024
