= Jasmyne Spencer =

American soccer player (born 1990)

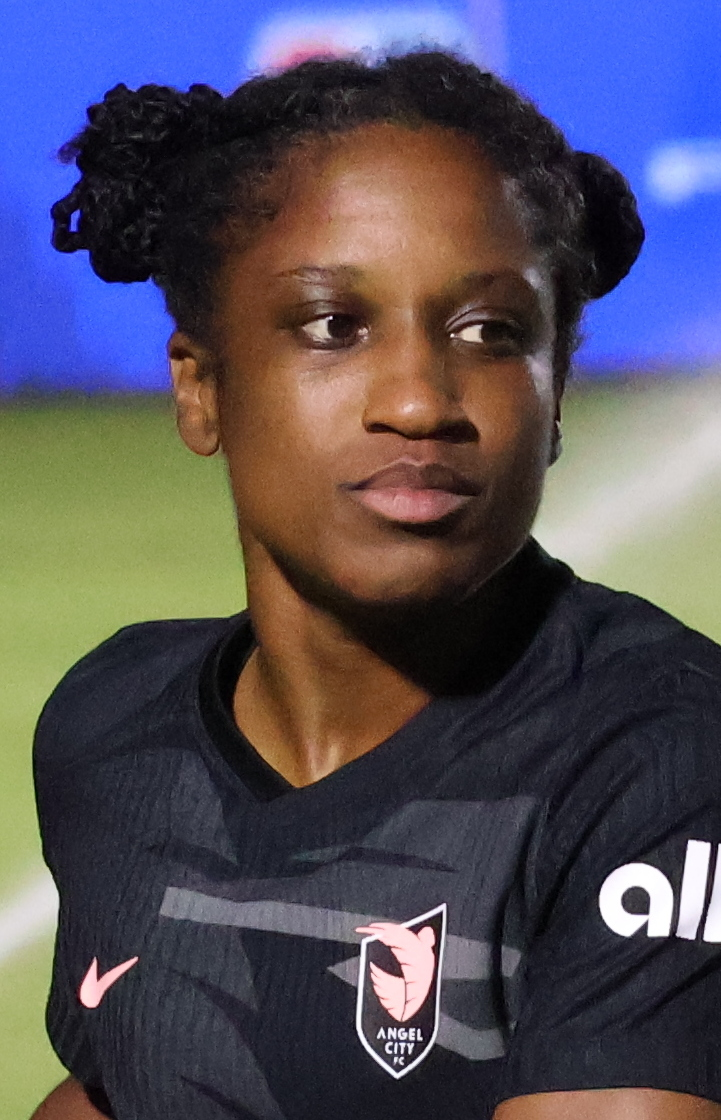
- Spencer with Angel City in 2024

Personal information
- Full name: Jasmyne Bryanne Spencer
- Date of birth: August 27, 1990 (age 36)
- Place of birth: Bay Shore, New York, United States
- Height: 5 ft 1 in (1.55 m)
- Positions: Forward; midfielder; fullback

College career
Years	Team	Apps	(Gls)
2008–2011	Maryland Terrapins		(20)

Senior career*
Years	Team	Apps	(Gls)
2012	New York Fury	10	(3)
2012	Brøndby IF	2	(0)
2013	Washington Spirit	17	(0)
2013–2014	→ Apollon Limassol (loan)	2	(1)
2014–2015	Western New York Flash	42	(6)
2014–2016	→ Sydney FC (loan)	27	(12)
2016–2017	Orlando Pride	41	(7)
2016–2017	→ Canberra United (loan)	8	(0)
2018–2021	OL Reign	28	(2)
2018–2019	→ Melbourne City (loan)	11	(4)
2021	Houston Dash	18	(1)
2022–2024	Angel City	57	(1)
2025	Vancouver Rise FC	24	(2)
- * Club domestic league appearances and goals as of October 17, 2025

Jasmyne Bryanne Spencer (born August 27, 1990) is an American professional soccer player who plays as a forward or fullback, most recently in 2025 for Vancouver Rise.

She has previously played for OL Reign, Orlando Pride, Western New York Flash and Washington Spirit in the NWSL, Sydney FC, Canberra United and Melbourne City in the Australian W-League, Cypriot side Apollon Limassol in the 2013–14 UEFA Women's Champions League, and Danish side Brøndby IF in the 2012–13 UEFA Women's Champions League.

== Early life ==
Spencer was born and raised in Long Island, New York and attended Bay Shore High School where she played soccer and ran track. Spencer was twice-named the high school team's most valuable player and served as captain. She led the team in scoring and assists for four seasons and set a school record for career goals. She played club soccer for the Albertson Fury 90 and won three consecutive state championships with the team.

== Playing career ==
=== New York Fury and Brøndby, 2012 ===
Spencer was selected by the Philadelphia Independence during the 2012 WPS Draft; however, the league suspended operations before play began. She later joined the New York Fury in the Women's Premier Soccer League Elite. Spencer joined Danish side Brøndby IF for two matches of the 2012–13 UEFA Women's Champions League logging a total of 25 minutes.

=== Washington Spirit and Apollon Limassol, 2013 ===
In 2013, Spencer signed with the Washington Spirit for the inaugural season of the NWSL.

In September 2013, Spencer was loaned to Apollon Limassol in the Cypriot First Division. She made two appearances for the club during their 2013–14 UEFA Women's Champions League campaign and scored one goal.

=== Western New York Flash, 2014–15 ===
Spencer joined the Western New York Flash ahead of the 2014 NWSL season. She scored her first goal for the Flash during a 2–1 over FC Kansas City on May 8. She scored a game-winning goal against the Washington Spirit, resulting in a 3–2 win.

==== Sydney FC, 2014–16 ====
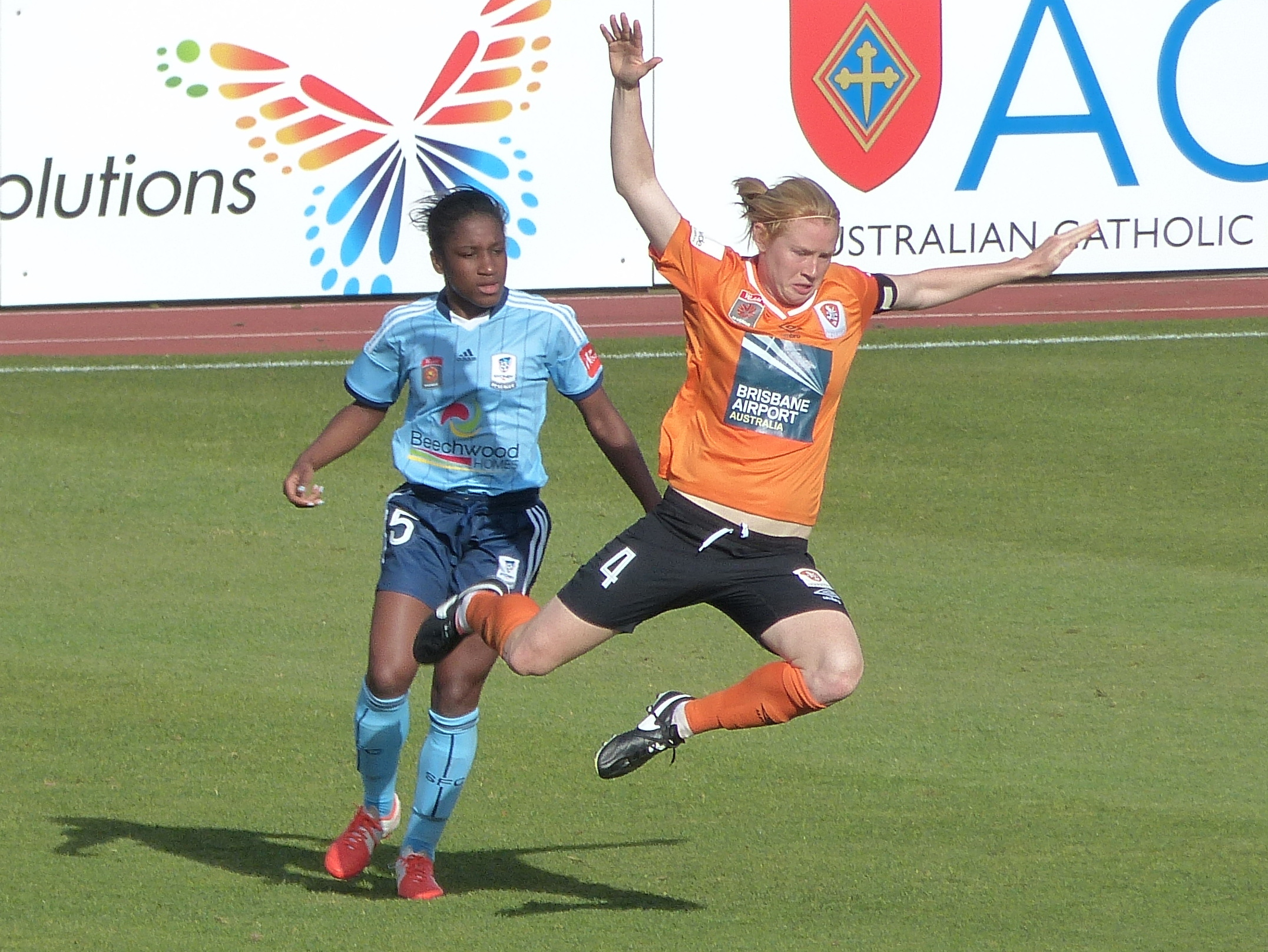
Spencer (left) playing for Sydney FC, 2014

In September 2014, Spencer signed with Sydney FC of the Australian W-League for the 2014 season. During her debut for the team during a match against Adelaide United, Spencer scored the game-winning brace resulting in a 2–0 win. The team was defeated by Perth Glory in the semi-finals. Spencer was named Players' Player of the Year by her teammates.

During the semi-final match the following year, Spencer scored the game-winning goal in the 67th minute to lead Sydney to a 1–0 win and berth to the 2016 W-League Grand Final.

=== Orlando Pride, 2016–17 ===
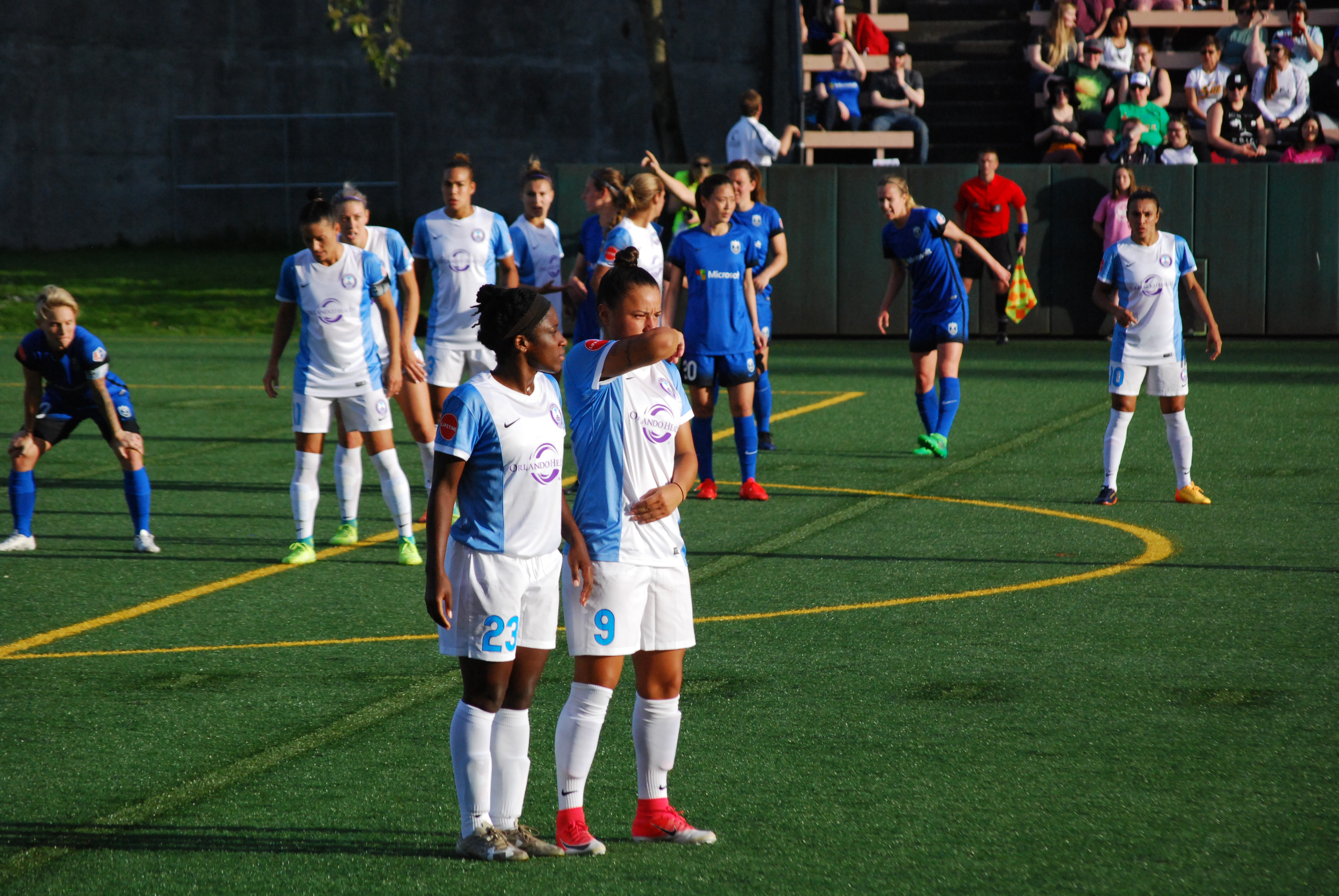
Spencer (23) during a match for the Orlando Pride, May 2017.

In November 2015, Orlando Pride selected Spencer as their fourth pick in the 2015 NWSL Expansion Draft. She scored her first goal for the Pride — a game-winner — during a 1–0 win over the Houston Dash on June 24. The goal was named Goal of the Week for Week 10 of the 2016 season. Two days later, she scored the team's lone goal during a 2–1 loss against Portland Thorns FC.

=== Canberra United, 2016–17 ===
Spencer joined Canberra United on loan for the 2016–17 W-League season.

=== OL Reign, 2018–2020 ===
In January 2018, Spencer was traded to Seattle Reign. She made her debut for the club during the team's home opener win against the Washington Spirit. The game marked Spencer's 100th cap in the NWSL. Spencer tore her ACL in the first game of the 2019 season and missed the remainder of the season.

=== Melbourne City FC, 2018–19 ===
Spencer joined Melbourne City on loan for the 2018–19 W-League season. She made her debut in City's season opener, a 2–0 loss to Canberra United but scored a hat-trick the following weekend in the team's home opener, a 3–1 victory over Sydney.

=== Houston Dash, 2021 ===
Spencer made her debut for Houston Dash in a 1–0 win against the Kansas City Current on June 6, 2021. She made 18 appearances for the club during the 2021 season notching 874 minutes on the pitch. She scored the game-winning goal against her former club Reign FC on July 2 in a 2–0 win.

=== Angel City FC, 2022–24 ===
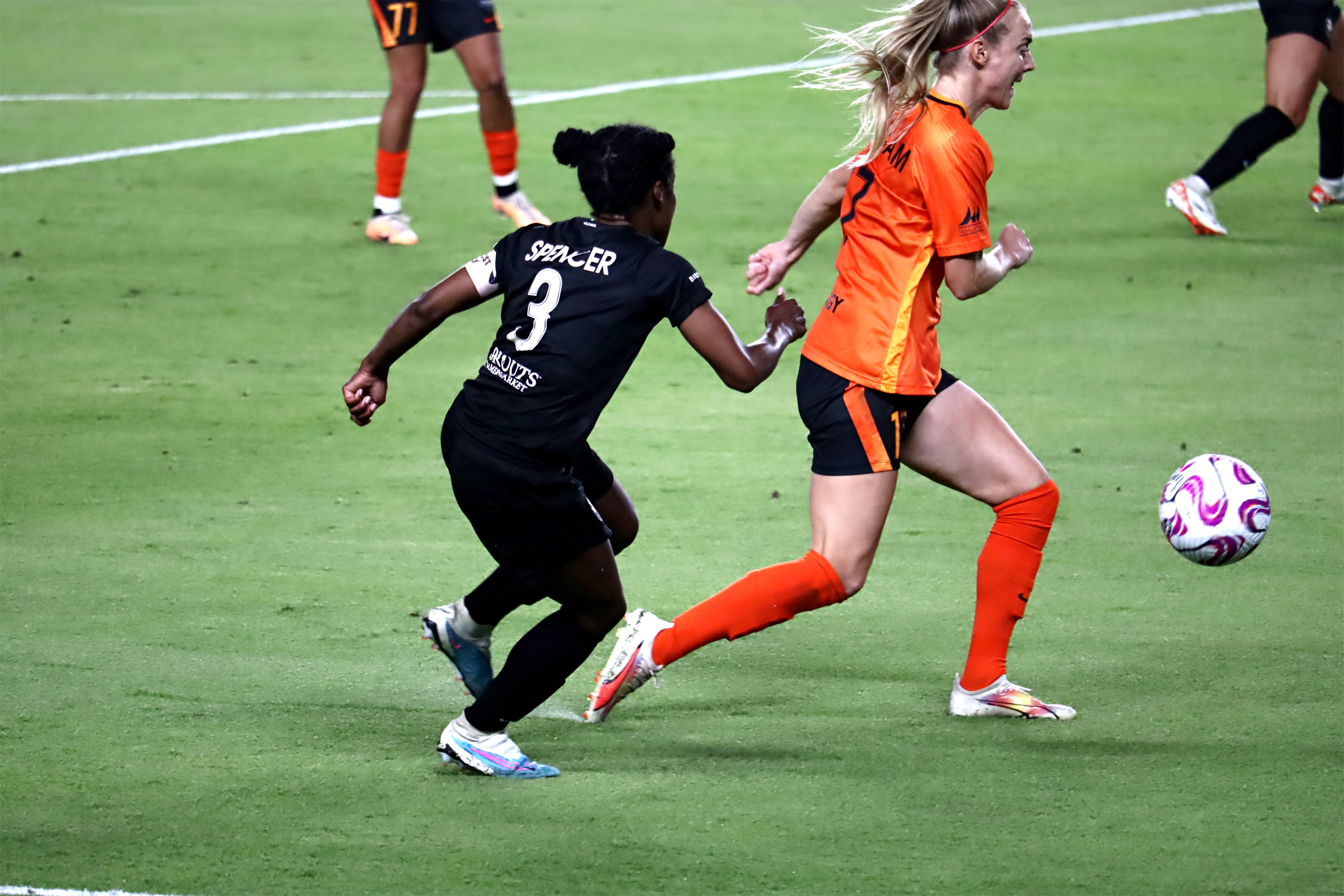
Spencer defends against a Houston Dash player, October 2023

On December 16, 2021, Spencer was selected in the fifth round of the 2022 NWSL Expansion Draft by expansion club Angel City FC and signed a two-year contract. On September 11, 2022, Spencer made her 150th NWSL appearance against her former club team, the Houston Dash. Spencer recorded 876 minutes and 17 clearances during the 2022 season and she started 10 of 15 regular season matches during their inaugural season which saw them finish in eighth place with a record of 8–9–5.

During the 2023 season, Spencer scored her first goal for the club, a match winner in a 1–0 victory against Kansas City Current which helped Angel City along its path to its first ever NWSL Playoff appearance where they finished the season fifth overall with a 8–7–7 record.

Spencer made her first start of the 2024 season on April 13, 2024, against Chicago Red Stars, playing a key role in Angel City's first win and clean sheet of the season. The game also marked her 175th NWSL regular-season appearance. Spencer made her 50th appearance for Angel City on September 1, 2024, in a home match against the Chicago Red Stars which finished as a 2–1 victory. Spencer is the first outfield player to reach this milestone for Angel City, and second overall after goalkeeper DiDi Haračić. After the conclusion of the 2024 season Spencer became a free agent and on December 10, 2024, Angel City announced they would not be signing Spencer to a new contact. Spencer finished her time at Angel City as the player with the most appearances across all competitions with 76.

=== Vancouver Rise FC, 2025 ===
On February 3, 2025 Spencer signed with Vancouver Rise FC of Canada's Northern Super League (NSL). In the 2025 season she played 1903 minutes and scored 2 goals on the way to the Rise's victory in the NSL Championship.

== Other work ==
Spencer created lifestyle brand "Jas It Up Headbands" in 2016. In 2019, while recovering from an ACL injury she rebranded it to "Jas It Up". The sustainable lifestyle brand sells clothing and accessories. The mission of the brand "is to educate and inspire people to lead an eco-conscious and socially aware lifestyle in an effort to uplift our communities, empower our youth, and protect our future on this planet."
