= Maia Pérez =

American soccer player (born 1999)

- Pérez with the Seattle Reign in 2024

Personal information
- Full name: Maia Early Pérez
- Date of birth: October 19, 1999 (age 27)
- Height: 5 ft 10 in (1.78 m)
- Position: Goalkeeper

Youth career
- Midwest United

College career
Years	Team	Apps	(Gls)
2017–2021	Hartford Hawks	72	(0)

Senior career*
Years	Team	Apps	(Gls)
2022	Angel City	0	(0)
2022	→ Issy (loan)	2	(0)
2023–2024	Seattle Reign	0	(0)
- * Club domestic league appearances and goals as of 17:44, November 8, 2026 (UTC)

Maia Early Pérez (born October 19, 1999) is an American former professional soccer player who played as a goalkeeper. She played college soccer for the Hartford Hawks before spending three professional seasons in the National Women's Soccer League (NWSL) with Angel City FC and the Seattle Reign, including a loan stint in France with GPSO 92 Issy.

== Early life ==
Pérez grew up in Kentwood, Michigan. She attended East Kentwood High School, where she played four years of both soccer and basketball. She was initially a member of her school's junior varsity soccer team as a freshman before being promoted to varsity later that spring. She finished her career with two all-state honors, including first-team all-state as a junior. As a sophomore in 2015, she led East Kentwood to a Michigan state semifinals appearance. Outside of school, Pérez played for local club Midwest United FC.

== College career ==
After receiving attention from programs at Western Michigan University, the University of Pittsburgh, and Coastal Carolina University, Pérez opted to play college soccer at the University of Hartford. As a freshman with the Hawks in 2017, she started all 19 games and played all but 45 minutes of the season, earning herself a spot on the America East Conference All-Rookie team. The following year, she recorded the most regular-season wins by a Hartford goalkeeper since 2011. Her 0.92 goals against average led the conference, and her 6 shutouts ranked for second. She also played every minute of the season, a feat she would continue throughout her remaining two seasons at Hartford.

In her junior year in 2019, Pérez was named to the All-America East second team and All-New England region third team after leading the conference with a career-best 0.824 save percentage. After the 2020 season was cancelled due to the COVID-19 pandemic, Pérez returned in 2021 for a final year of college. She put on another strong season with a conference-leading goals against average and a shutout record that tied for second. She departed from Hartford ranking eighth in career saves and tenth in career shutouts.

== Club career ==
Pérez registered for the 2022 NWSL Draft, but was not selected. In February 2022, she was invited to NWSL expansion team Angel City FC for a preseason trial stint. The following month, she signed her first professional contract with Angel City, becoming one of DiDi Haračić's backups. After not making any appearances for the team throughout the first half of the season, Pérez was sent out on a one-year loan to French Division 2 Féminine club GPSO 92 Issy. Despite having been signed as Issy's starting goalkeeper, Pérez only made 2 appearances for the club. She returned to Angel City at the end of the NWSL season and announced her intention to retire from professional soccer.

Ultimately, Pérez opted to continue her playing career past 2022. On September 21, 2023, the OL Reign announced that they had signed Pérez as a free agent through the remainder of the season. After being on the Reign roster for the team's final 3 regular season matches and three playoff games, she was re-signed through 2024 at the end of the year. She didn't earn any playing time in her second season with the Reign and was released upon the expiration of her contract.

Pérez has since retired from playing professional soccer.

== Honors and awards ==
Individual

- Second-team All-America East: 2018
- America East all-rookie team: 2017
