= Freya Coombe =

English footballer and coach

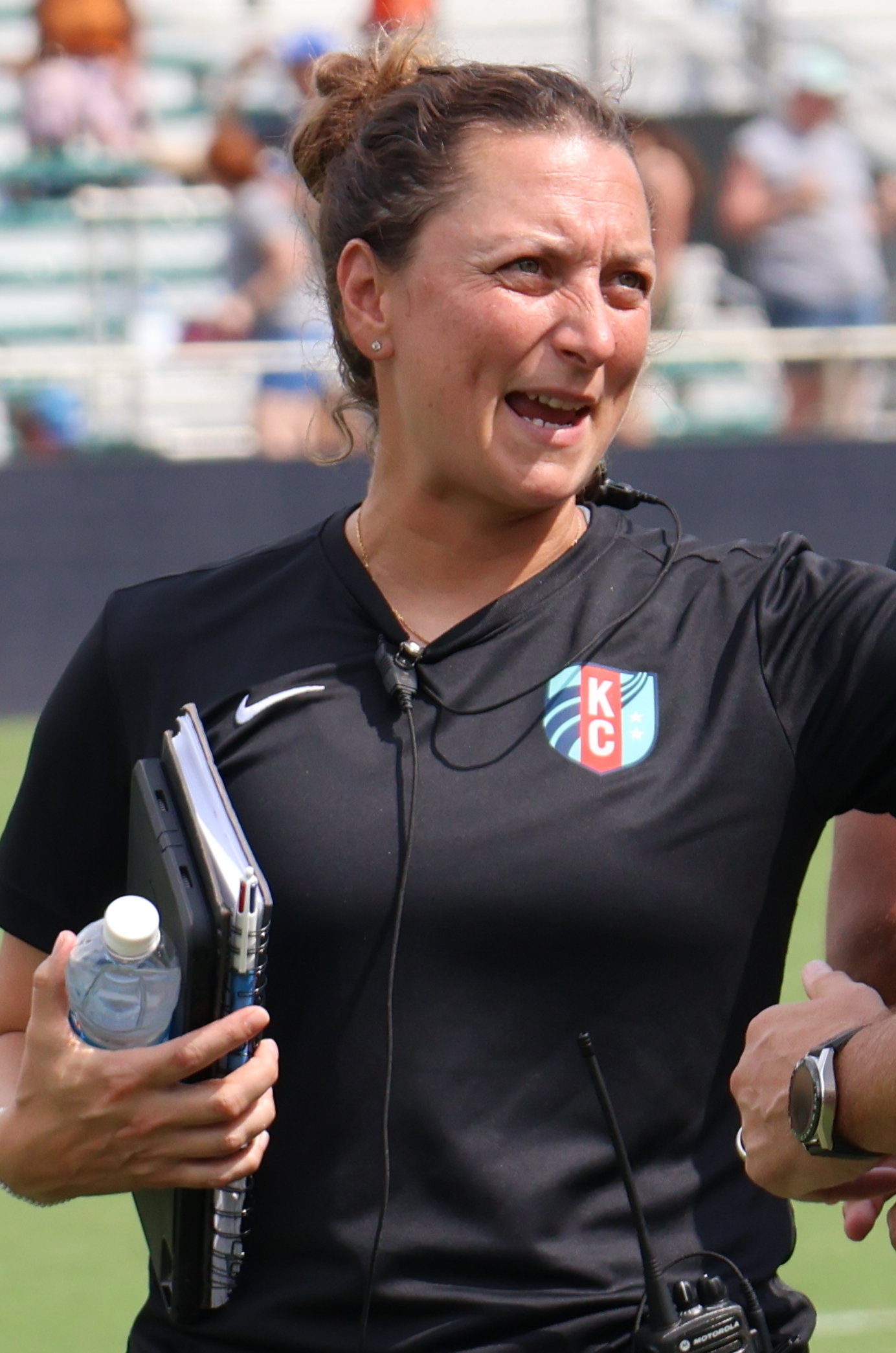
- Coombe with the Kansas City Current in 2024

Personal information
- Place of birth: England

Senior career*
Years	Team	Apps	(Gls)
- Reading

Managerial career
- 2013–2014: Reading Reserves
- 2019–2021: NJ/NY Gotham FC (Note: Sky Blue FC changed its name to NJ/NY Gotham FC in 2021)
- 2022–2023: Angel City FC
- 2024–: Kansas City Current (assistant)
- * Club domestic league appearances and goals

Freya Coombe is an English football manager and former player who is an assistant coach for the Kansas City Current of the National Women's Soccer League (NWSL). She formerly managed NJ/NY Gotham FC and Angel City FC of the NWSL.

== Early life ==
Coombe grew up in Buckinghamshire, England. Alongside her early part-time football managing career, Coombe was also a full-time lecturer of sports sciences at Buckinghamshire New University.

== Club career ==
Coombe played for Reading for five years.

== Managerial career ==
Coombe coached in various roles at Reading over a seven-year period, including managing the club's reserve team. Coombe's players at Reading included a young Fran Kirby.

Coombe then moved to the United States and coached youth soccer in the New York metropolitan area, in part thanks to a reference from former Reading player Mikaela Howell then working at Everton America, a Connecticut-based youth affiliate of Everton F.C.

=== NJ/NY Gotham FC, 2019–2021 ===
In 2019, Coombe inquired at New Jersey–based Sky Blue FC of the National Women's Soccer League to observe the club as part of her development, and watched the team in July and August 2019. The club's head coach Denise Reddy was fired before Coombe's arrival, and goalkeeping coach Hugo Macedo was named the club's caretaker during Coombe's stint as an observer. On 4 September 2019, Sky Blue FC named Coombe as its interim head coach.

The team removed her interim tag in December 2019. The club later renamed to NJ/NY Gotham FC. The club's best result in an NWSL competition during Coombe's tenure was reaching the finals of the 2021 NWSL Challenge Cup, where Gotham FC drew 1–1 against Portland Thorns FC after extra time and lost 5–6 in a penalty shootout.

On 22 August 2021, NWSL expansion team Angel City FC named Coombe its first head coach, to begin play in the 2022 NWSL season. After initially planning on managing Gotham FC for the remainder of the 2021 NWSL season, Gotham FC general manager Yael Averbuch West announced on 24 August 2021 that the team and Coombe agreed that Coombe should resign on 29 August 2021.

=== Angel City FC, 2022–2023 ===
Coombe guided Angel City FC in its inaugural season to a 1–4–1 record and last-place West Division group finish in the 2022 NWSL Challenge Cup. In the regular season, Angel City remained in contention for the NWSL Playoffs until the season's final round, but finished at eighth place on the table with a record of 8–9–5 and did not qualify.

On June 15, 2023, Angel City FC announced that it had "parted ways" with Coombe the previous day. A report by Meg Linehan in The Athletic published on June 14 claimed the team had fired her. Her firing followed a 2–6–3 start to the season, and Angel City were in 11th place of 12 teams at the time of her exit.

=== KC Current, 2024– ===
After a brief step away from the NWSL, Freya Coombe returned in January 2024 to work under former USWNT coach Vlatko Andonovki, becoming Assistant Coach to the Kansas City Current.

== Managerial statistics ==
As of 15 June 2023

Managerial record by team and tenure, all official competitions
Team	From	To	Record							
Team	From	To	P	W	D	L	GF	GA	GD	Win %
NJ/NY Gotham FC	4 September 2019	29 August 2021	31	9	9	13	32	37	−5	29.03
Angel City FC	19 March 2022	14 June 2023	36	10	9	17	39	53	−14	27.78
Career totals			67	19	18	30	71	90	−19	28.36
