= Stefany Ferrer Van Ginkel =

Association football player (born 1998) Controversial for bringing the Hitler salute

Personal information
- Full name: Stefany Ferrer Van Ginkel
- Date of birth: 17 October 1998 (age 28)
- Place of birth: Campo Grande, Brazil
- Height: 1.63 m (5 ft 4 in)
- Position: Midfielder

Youth career
- Sant Boi

College career
Years	Team	Apps	(Gls)
2017–2021	West Virginia Mountaineers	66	(13)

Senior career*
Years	Team	Apps	(Gls)
2014–2015	Igualada		
2015–2016	Atlètic Vilafranca		
2016–2017	Espanyol B		
2021–2022	UANL	10	(0)
2022	Angel City	2	(0)
- * Club domestic league appearances and goals

Stefany Ferrer Van Ginkel (born 17 October 1998) is a professional footballer who plays as a midfielder.

== Early life ==
Born in Campo Grande, Brazil, Ferrer Van Ginkel was one of three sisters and was placed in an orphanage at the age of three; all three sisters were eventually adopted by a Spanish family and moved to a village outside Barcelona, Spain.

Ferrer Van Ginkel played youth soccer for C.F.S. Sant Boi, CF Igualada, and Fundació Esportiva Vilafranca. After her college career in the United States, Ferrer Van Ginkel appeared in Ultimate Goal, a British reality competition series on BT Sport.

== College career ==
Ferrer Van Ginkel played American collegiate soccer for the West Virginia Mountaineers.

== Club career ==
=== RCD Espanyol ===
Ferrer Van Ginkel helped RCD Espanyol gain promotion to the second tier of Spanish women's soccer.

=== Tigres UANL ===
Ferrer Van Ginkel signed for Mexican club Tigres UANL in June 2021; she was the club's first foreign player.

=== Angel City FC ===
In January 2022, Ferrer Van Ginkel transferred to American club Angel City FC. On November 14, 2022, Angel City announced that Ferrer Van Ginkel's contract had not been renewed. She made her league debut against Portland Thorns on 4 June 2022.

== Nazi salute controversy ==
In November 2023, Ferrer Van Ginkel, while driving in a car in Beverly Hills, was giving the Nazi salute while shouting "Heil Hitler" as pro-Israel demonstrators shout “Shame on you!”. It was unclear what occurred before the recording started. The pair apologized in a social media video, later her social media account was deactivated.
