= History of professional soccer in Seattle =

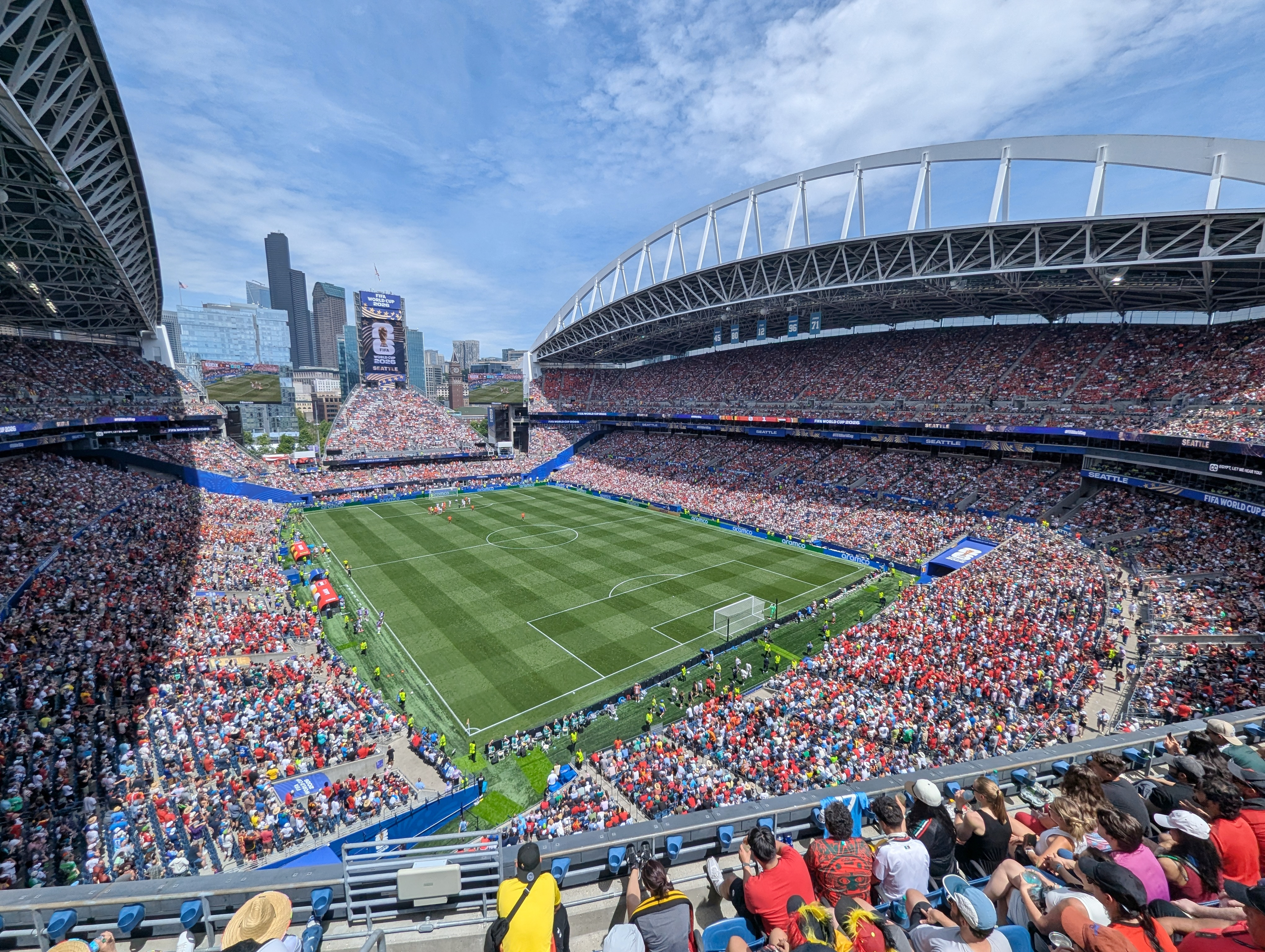
Lumen Field hosts a match between Belgium and Egypt at the 2026 FIFA World Cup.

Seattle has had professional soccer clubs for over four decades who have played in various leagues since the 1970s. These include three incarnations of the Seattle Sounders FC, playing in the North American Soccer League, United Soccer League, and Major League Soccer.

The city is also home to Seattle Reign FC, which began in 2013 as a founding member of the National Women's Soccer League. Seattle has also hosted teams from the Continental Indoor Soccer League and the Major Arena Soccer League.

== Seattle Sounders (NASL), 1974–1983 ==
On December 11, 1973, a group of Seattle investors led by Walt Daggatt were granted rights to a franchise in the top-level North American Soccer League (NASL), one of three (including Vancouver Whitecaps FC and San Jose Earthquakes) heralding the expansion of America's struggling top-tier soccer league to the west coast. With a budget under $500,000, the investors searched existing American and British teams to assemble a coaching squad and assemble a lineup. Longtime NASL All-Star player John Best was hired as coach and recruited former Everton star Jimmy Gabriel, 1969 NASL MVP Pepe Fernandez, Crewe defender Dave Gillett and Hartlepool goalkeeper Barry Watling, among others.

On January 22, 1974, the team was christened Seattle Sounders, the moniker having won a highly publicized "name the team" contest (Seattle Mariners, the eventual name of the city's second baseball team, was a runner-up). The "lads" (so-called because the team were largely English players) were introduced to the media and the public in early Spring, announcing they would play their first home game on May 5. At the time, soccer was largely ignored by the national media, and the game was understood and played by a very small percentage of the population; but Seattle's post-war immigrants from Scandinavia and Britain had brought awareness of soccer, and a youth soccer league had started in 1966. Whether professional soccer could work in Seattle was anyone's guess.

The answer came at the club's inaugural game, when the Sounders took on the Denver Dynamos in Memorial Stadium, whose capacity of 13000 was considered ample for a sport which had never averaged more than 3000–5000 in other American cities. Over 12000 came to the opening match, the start of which was delayed to allow the unexpectedly large walk-up crowd to enter the stands. Longtime Seattle sportswriter Royal Brougham introduced the team to great fanfare, though he was booed when he chose to sing, "Take Me Out to the Ballgame", as Seattle sports fans were still embittered over the loss a few years earlier of the Seattle Pilots Major League Baseball team. It appeared Seattle was ready to embrace a different summer sport.

The Sounders won their home opener 4–1, and fans were hooked. By early summer, the Sounders stunned the American sports community by posting the first-ever sellout of a stadium for a soccer game, drawing 13,498 to their game against the defending champion Philadelphia Atoms. The Sounders proved successful on the field as well, with a 10–7–3 record, and Barry Watling won Goalkeeper of the Year honors with an astounding 0.80 goals against average. 36000 tickets were printed in anticipation of a home playoff game to be held in Husky Stadium. Despite their winning record, the NASL points system meant Seattle was edged out of the final playoff spot on the last day of the season, and they finished in third place in the highly competitive Western Conference that year.

The Sounders returned in 1975 with the addition of Tottenham Hotspur defender and UEFA Cup winner Mike England to anchor the defensive midfield. The success of the Sounders and other western teams led other teams to boost their lineups as well, including the signing of Pelé by the New York Cosmos. Memorial Stadium was expanded several times, eventually growing to hold 17,925, and sold out every game; amazingly, it never rained on a Sounders game in this outdoor facility. On the field, the Sounders were one of the league's better teams, posting a 15–7 record and making their first playoff appearance at Portland; their 2–1 loss in the quarterfinals cemented the Portland Timbers-Seattle Sounders rivalry which grew to become American soccer's most storied derby. Two indoor soccer exhibition games were played as a training exercise that winter as well, marking the origins of that version of the sport.

The Sounders' success helped Daggatt and his partners get the NFL Seattle Seahawks franchise, and both teams started play in the Kingdome in 1976. The first sporting event held at the Kingdome was a Sounders match against the Cosmos on April 9; 58,128 fans packed the Kingdome that day to investigate the new building and get a look at Pelé, who scored two goals to lead the Cosmos to a 3–1 victory. Important player signings included former English World Cup 1966 star Geoff Hurst and goalkeeper Tony Chursky who would lead the league with a 0.91 goals against average. The Sounders also led the NASL in attendance in 1976 with 23,826 fans per match, and the team held its first home playoff game, a 2–1 victory over the rival Vancouver Whitecaps FC, reaching the Divisional Championships of the 1976 NASL playoffs before falling short on the road to the Minnesota Kicks 3–0. The Kicks then returned to the Kingdome for Soccer Bowl '76, where they lost before an unsupportive Seattle crowd of 25000 to the Toronto Metros-Croatia.

Jimmy Gabriel assumed the coaching duties from John Best in the 1977 season. The club started slowly, losing 7 of their first 11 games; but a 10-5 tear placed them at 14-12 for the season, and fans continued to come out in large numbers, in part to see the team's first homegrown star, Seattle native and 1977 NASL Rookie of the Year Jimmy McAlister. Upsetting the favored L.A. Aztecs on the road in the conference final, they then edged them at home 1–0 before 56,000 fans, winning the Pacific Conference Championship and making it to their first ever championship game. Thousands of Seattle fans drove to Portland, the site of Soccer Bowl '77, to see them play the New York Cosmos before an international audience in what was to be Pelé's last game.

== F.C. Seattle Storm (WSA), 1984–1995 ==
Football Club Seattle Storm, also known as the F.C. Seattle Storm, was an American soccer team based in Seattle. F.C. Seattle was a "super club" created to provide Seattle players an opportunity to play at a higher level than the local recreational and semi-pro leagues. In addition to playing exhibition matches against top international teams, F.C. Seattle was a member of the short lived Western Soccer Alliance, was a founding member of the American Professional Soccer League and later spent three seasons in the Pacific Coast Soccer League.

== Seattle SeaDogs (CISL), 1995–1997 ==
The Seattle SeaDogs were an indoor soccer team that played in the Continental Indoor Soccer League (CISL) from 1995 to 1997. They won the last CISL championship in 1997.

== Seattle Sounders (APSL / A-League / USL-1), 1994–2008 ==
The club was founded in 1994 and named after the original Seattle Sounders team, which played from 1974 to 1983 in the North American Soccer League. Former coach Alan Hinton had acquired rights to the Sounders name after the club folded and began a campaign to bring an American Professional Soccer League (APSL; later the A-League) team to the city in 1992. The league previously had another Seattle team, the Seattle Storm, that had joined from the Western Soccer Alliance and played for one APSL season in 1990 before they folded.

A bid for a new APSL team, to be named the Sounders and owned by former Microsoft executives Scott Oki and Neil Farnsworth, was announced in September 1993. The bid's approval was announced by United States Soccer Federation secretary general Hank Steinbrecher on January 30, 1994, during a men's international friendly match between the United States and Russia at the Kingdome that was attended by 43,651 spectators. The reborn Sounders competed with a rival group that aimed to create a Seattle franchise for Major League Soccer, the new top-level soccer league for the United States. Hinton was named club president and later appointed himself as head coach prior to the inaugural season.

=== Brian Schmetzer Era ===
Prior to the beginning of the 2002 campaign, the Sounders were coming off a dismal performance the previous season. With the firing of Englishmen Bernie James the Sounders were in need of hiring a new head coach. Hanauer called on Brian Schmetzer, who last coached the indoor club, the Seattle SeaDogs, and asked him if he was interested in the job. Schmetzer agreed and took the job that season. Schmetzer's highlights of his six-year tenure include Pacific Division titles in his inaugural season and the following season. In 2004, during his third year of coaching, he led the Sounders to the A-League championship game where the team ultimately lost to the Montreal Impact. The next year, in the Sounders debut in the USL First Division, Schmetzer led the club again to the finals, where they successfully defeated the Richmond Kickers in penalties.

Schmetzer was a finalist for the 2007 coach of the year award. Although the team had started the season 1–3–4, they went on to claim the Commissioner's Cup for the league's best regular season record. The team also had a 15-game unbeaten run that included MLS opponents in the U.S. Open Cup. The Sounders went on to beat the Atlanta Silverbacks 4–0 to win the postseason championship.

==== 2002–04: Pacific Champions, and run to USL Final ====
The Sounders' 2002 season was easily the strongest season for the USL team and arguably the strongest year of all Sounders franchises. In Brian Schmetzer's inaugural campaign as Sounders manager, Schmetzer led the club to 23 victories in 28 matches. In 2002, the Sounders only lost one regular season match and had four draws. The record results in 107 points for the season, and easily obtaining the Commissioner's Cup by 22 points.

By earning the Commissioner's Cup, and winning the Pacific Division regular season title, the Sounders earned a direct bye to the Western Conference semifinals (or the quarterfinals) against their Cascadian rivals, the Vancouver Whitecaps. The first leg in Seattle was a solid start for the Sounders, as they cruised to a 2–0 win. The second leg, however, was a disaster. The match ended in a blowout 6–2 defeat. The defeat resulted in a 6–4 aggregate loss putting a shocking, abrupt end to the Sounders phenomenal season.

==== 2005–08: Three years, two titles ====
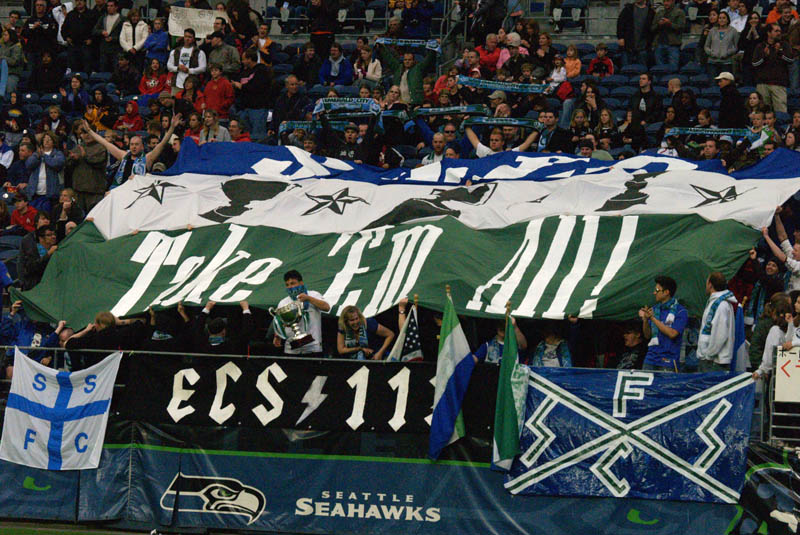
Emerald City Supporters display at the 2008 home opener

Starting with the 2005 USL Division One season, the Sounders made it a top priority to win the USL postseason championship, especially following their shortcomings in 2004, with a defeat against Montreal Impact. During their 2005 campaign, Sounders goalie Preston Burpo, was second in the league in goals against average, averaging .85 goals a match. That season, defender Taylor Graham won the league's "Defender of the Year" award as well and was named to the "USL First Division Best XI" that year, too. In 2005, the Sounders finished in fourth place, and went on to win the championship against the Richmond Kickers in penalty kicks.

The following year, 2006, proved to be a rough year for the defending champions, as they failed to qualify for the playoffs, and finished in seventh place in the league table. In the midst of their dismal season, striker Cam Weaver netted 18 goals for the club, as well as an additional three assists scoring 39 individual points in the USL First Division. He finished the season with the second highest number of points behind Miami FC's Romario. Weaver was also named the USL First Division's "Rookie of the Year". Weaver received some minor international recognition, and subsequently signed with second division-Norwegian club FK Haugesund. In 2014 he returned to Seattle and played one year for the MLS-side Seattle Sounders FC.

Although 2007 was highlighted by the announcement of Seattle being award an MLS expansion franchise, the Sounders had a successful USL season, which proved to be their best in club history. First, the Sounders won the Commissioner's Cup, which is an award given the league champion with the best season record, of 16–6–6. They went on to win the postseason USL Cup, by thrashing Atlanta 4–0. In the 2007 U.S. Open Cup, the Sounders made a semifinal run, before losing to FC Dallas 2–1 in extra time. In the Open Cup quarterfinals, the Sounders thrashed MLS-side Colorado Rapids, 5–0, thus making it the largest margin of victory a USL club has ever had over an MLS club in any competition. Beforehand in the early rounds, the Sounders played Chivas USA, Portland Timbers and Banat Arsenal.

With the announcement of the MLS franchise, the USL team would play their last season in 2008. Midfielders Roger Levesque and Zach Scott would transition from the USL to the MLS Sounders after a two-month trial period. Schmetzer was a candidate for the head coach position for the MLS Sounders, but the job eventually went to Sigi Schmid, who had previously coached the Los Angeles Galaxy and Columbus Crew. Schmetzer took the role as the top assistant.

== Previous attempts at MLS expansion, 1993–2007 ==
=== Debate for MLS or APSL club ===
Upon the incarnation of Major League Soccer, the Seattle metro area was shortlisted as a potential candidate to host an inaugural MLS club. However, when it came time have a petition to sign with the league, the Seattle organizers only managed to secure 1,300 assurances. The low numbers were at first claimed to be the result between a ticket campaign between bringing an MLS expansion club to Seattle, and tickets for the American Professional Soccer League (APSL) Sounders.

Failing to reach the minimum 10,000-signatures, Seattle was consequently excluded among the first seven cities to be awarded an MLS club. However, in spite of this, the league announced that five more teams were to be announced later that year, with the chance to improve their chances. Subsequently, Seattle MLS organizers began working with the University of Washington to secure use of Husky Stadium as a tentative stadium while they pursued the construction of a permanent soccer-specific stadium.

In November 1994, the inaugural MLS season was postponed to 1996. It was then noted that the absence of an "adequate grass-field facility" in the region, as well as the presence of the new APSL Seattle Sounders team had thwarted Seattle's MLS franchise bid. In the end, Seattle was not among the cities chosen to establish a team during the first season of the MLS.

=== Second attempt for MLS franchise ===
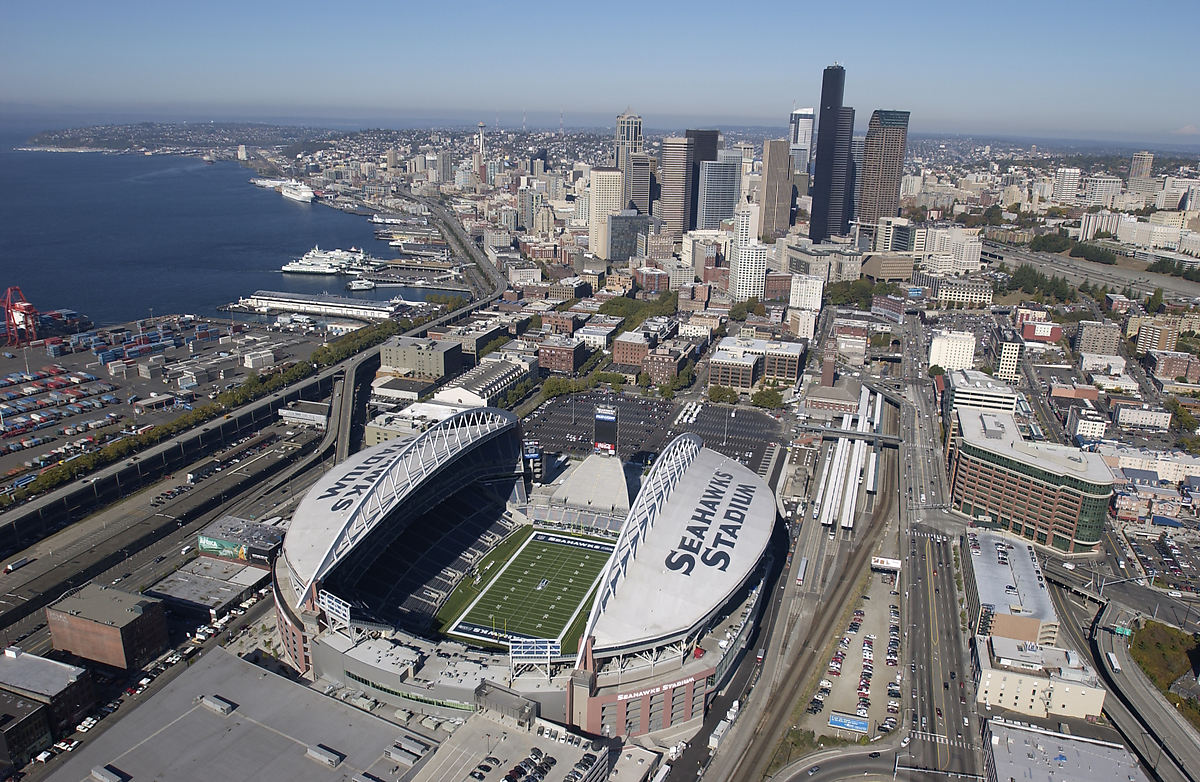
Upon completion in 2002, Qwest Field was also designed for soccer, providing separate amenities for soccer teams.

During the debutant MLS season; Paul Allen, the owner of the NFL franchise, worked with the city to build a new football stadium for his team (today Lumen Field). With the possibility of an MLS expansion team that could be a co-tenant the facility helped drive public support for the stadium effort. Many state voters supported the referendum to construct the Seahawks Stadium, because it was expected to double as a professional soccer venue. While the stadium problem was being resolved, a new issue arrose. By 2000, MLS was veered away from league-operated clubs, towards investor-operated franchises. As result, wealthy individuals would need to step forward for Seattle to obtain an MLS franchise.

In the early 2000s, MLS announced their intention to have their first expansion since 1998. In 2002, Seattle was once-again listed as a possible market for an MLS expansion team. But in 2004, the two franchises were award to Salt Lake City, and a second franchise to the Los Angeles area, these teams later becoming known as Real Salt Lake and Chivas USA, respectively. MLS commissioner Don Garber indicated that Seattle had been "very close" to receiving the expansion team, and ended up being third on the list. Adrian Hanauer, then-owner of the United Soccer League's (USL) Sounders (formerly the APSL Sounders), was in discussions with MLS about an estimated payment of $1 million to purchase an MLS franchise, that could be placed in the Seattle area in time for the 2006 season.

When Seattle was passed over again during the 2006 season (the franchise was awarded to Houston), Hanauer announced that he would not be able to secure an expansion team without the help of more investors willing to help cover the increasing MLS franchise fees which had grown beyond $10 million by the mid-2000s.

== Seattle Sounders FC (Major League Soccer), 2007–present ==
=== Seattle awarded expansion franchise ===
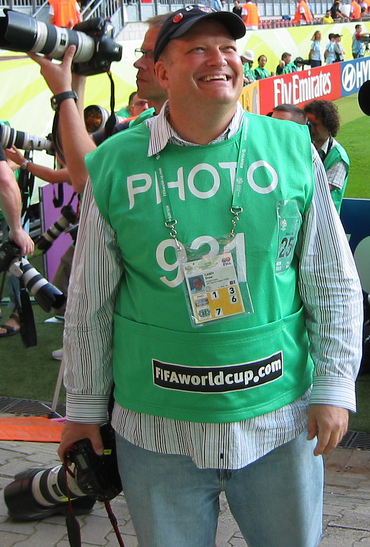
TV personality, Drew Carey became a part owner with the Sounders FC, in a bid to join MLS

Following the shortcomings in 2006, the next year, Hanauer teamed up with Hollywood producer Joe Roth to make another bid for MLS expansion into Seattle. This time, at a fee of $30 million. Paul Allen, whose First and Goal company operated Qwest Field (formerly Seahawks Stadium), joined the duo later that year, making the fourth bid the most promising yet for the region. During the first week of November 2007, rumors began circulating that MLS would be announcing an expansion franchise into the Seattle market the following week and that the ownership trio had brought on a fourth member: TV personality Drew Carey.

During a press conference on November 13, 2007; it was announced that Seattle had been awarded an expansion club by MLS. The announcement provided a return of top-level soccer to Seattle for the first time since the dissolution of its North American Soccer League (NASL) club in 1983.

==== New crest, same name ====
On April 7, 2008; along with the club's colors, badge design and logo, the Seattle MLS franchise announced their club's name. To decide the name, the organization held an online poll to decide the name. Overwhelmingly, supporters voted to retain the "Sounders" name, alluding to the past Sounders teams.

"Seattle Sounders FC" was announced as the team name on April 7, 2008, along with the team logo, colors, and badge design, in a presentation held at the Space Needle. The "FC" in the team moniker stands for Football Club, but the team name is officially Seattle Sounders FC. The badge design resembles a heraldic shield and consists of two layers which represent "the partnership between the ownership, the community, the players and the fans." The logo incorporates the Space Needle, an internationally recognized Seattle landmark. The official team colors are Sounder Blue, signifying the waters of the Puget Sound; Rave Green, representing the forests of the Pacific Northwest; and Cascade Shale, representing the Cascade Range to the east of Seattle.

Fans chose a name for the team in an online poll held between March 27 and 31, 2008. The initial list of possibilities – Seattle FC, Seattle Republic and Seattle Alliance – deliberately did not include Seattle Sounders in order to provide a "fresh start." Despite the names having been selected through fan research and internal committees, the omission of the traditional Sounders name rankled many in the Seattle community. In response to the backlash, the team added a fourth "write-in" option for the team name, allowing for any name to be suggested on the ballot. Of the over 14,500 votes received for the new team name, 49% of the votes included some form of the name Sounders. Upon announcing the name, Hanauer acknowledged the significance of keeping with tradition: "The team playing at the highest level in our region has always been called Sounders. Starting with the NASL and then the USL 1st Division, we now have the chance to create a separate and distinct identity with the new MLS team."

Team ownership revealed the first Sounders FC jersey on May 28, 2008, and announced Microsoft as the team's sponsor in a five-year deal worth approximately $20 million. As part of the agreement, the Xbox 360 and Xbox Live brands appear on the front of Sounders FC's jerseys and throughout the stadium.

=== Sigi Schmid era ===
==== 2009: Inaugural MLS campaign ====
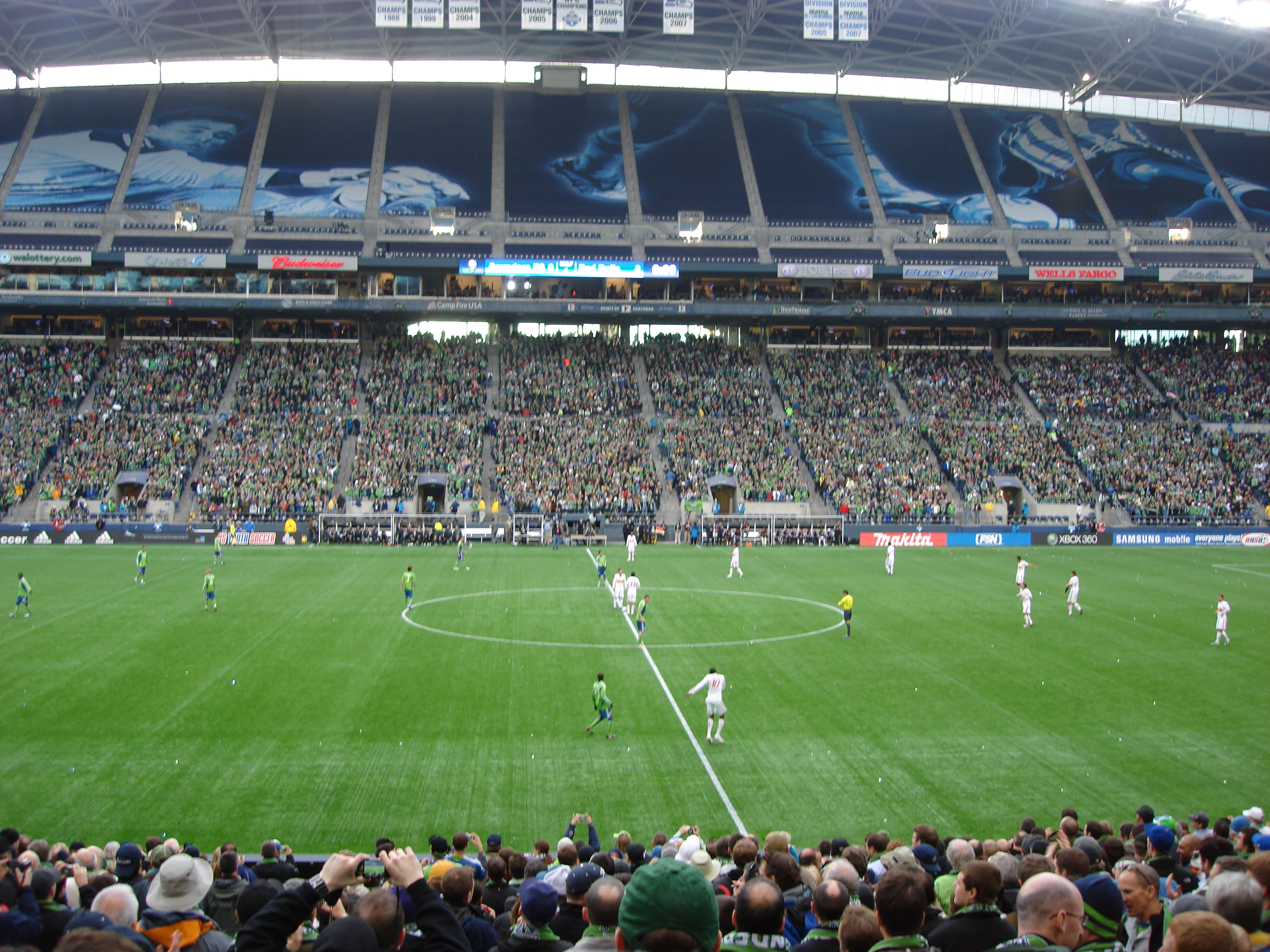
New York Red Bulls kick-off to start the 2009 MLS season against Seattle

The Sounders began their inaugural MLS campaign during the 2009 MLS season. Prior to the opening match, the Sounders sold all 22,000 of their season ticket packages. The 22,000 ticket holders, gave the Sounders a record for the most season ticket holders ever in MLS history. They played their first home match on March 19, 2009, to a sold-out crowd of 32,523, defeating the 2008 MLS Cup runners-up, New York Red Bulls, by a 3–0 margin. Seattle was the first MLS expansion team to win their first three games, and they did so with a shutout in each. Fredy Montero scored the first regular season goal in team history, finishing a movement from Sebastien Le Toux and Osvaldo Alonso in the 12th minute. Montero assisted Brad Evans' goal, and also scored the team's third goal. Kasey Keller, a veteran American goalkeeper who had played his entire career abroad, made his MLS debut at 39 years of age, and made two saves to register the team's first regular season shutout.

March 2009 saw Montero winning Player of the Week honors for week 1 and Keller for week 2. Montero won Goal of the Week for the first two games and was named the Player of the Month.

After their first two victories at home, Sounders FC played their MLS away fixture against Toronto FC. The Sounders expected a challenging away environment, but were victorious in a 2–0 shutout. Soon after, reports out of Seattle linked Montero to a sexual assault case with an unidentified woman. In a statement made by Sounders publicist, Montero asserted that the allegations stemmed from a disagreement in which he sought to end the relationship. and a police inquiry resulted in no charges being filed. Seattle Sounders FC suffered their first competitive loss at home against the Kansas City Wizards. Kasey Keller was sent off in the 29th minute for a handball outside the 18-yard box, as the Sounders fell 1–0 to the Wizards. The following week they lost at Chivas USA. Chris Eylander was scored on twice while covering the goal during Keller's suspension. The Sounders again failed to score.

The Sounders returned to their winning ways in a 2–0 home win versus the San Jose Earthquakes.

It was announced in early July that the Sounders had signed left-footed Costa Rican defender Leonardo González to help at the left back position. The position had been a weak spot in Seattle's defense and filled by three separate players throughout the season.

On July 11, the Sounders hosted the Houston Dynamo at Qwest Field. Brian Schmetzer filled in for Schmid who was at his son's wedding. Ianni scored his first goal of the season on bicycle kick that would earn him the MLS goal of the Week. On the following Tuesday, the Sounders defeated the Dynamo at Strfire in the U.S. Open Cup semifinals. Houston led when Jaqua scored in the 89th minute. King scored a goal five minutes into extra time, thus sending the Sounders FC to the Open Cup finals against D.C. United.

On July 18, 2009, the Seattle Sounders lost 0–2 in a friendly with Chelsea. All sections of the stadium were open and sold out with a crowd of 65,289 in attendance. The game was the first with the team for Chelsea's new manager, Carlo Ancelotti, and their new forward Daniel Sturridge.

The club set a state record for attendance at a soccer match on August 5, 2009, when 66,848 attended a friendly match with FC Barcelona.

On September 2, 2009, Sounders FC became the second MLS expansion team in league history (Chicago was first) to win the U.S. Open Cup tournament in their first season. They did so by defeating D.C. United 2–1 on the road at RFK Stadium. In winning the U.S. Open Cup tournament, they qualified for the preliminary round of the 2010–11 CONCACAF Champions League.

On October 17, 2009, Sounders FC became the second MLS expansion team in league history (again, Chicago had been first) to qualify for the playoffs in their first season. They clinched a playoff berth with a come-from-behind victory over the Kansas City Wizards 3–2 at Kansas City. Seattle finished the regular season with a record of 12 wins, 7 losses, and 11 ties. The club set a new MLS record for average attendance at 30,943 fans per game. Their inaugural season came to an end in the 2009 MLS Cup Playoffs when they lost in the conference semifinals to the Houston Dynamo with a 1–0 aggregate score in a two-legged series. During the 2009 season, all 15 Sounders FC MLS regular season home matches, their home playoff match, and their 4 home U.S. Open Cup matches (played at Starfire Sports Complex) were sold out.

===== First U.S. Open Cup title =====
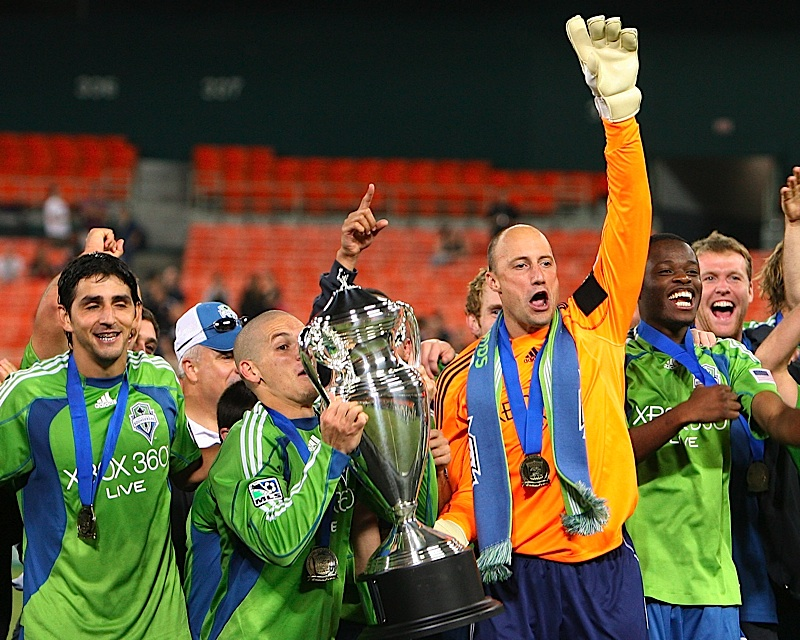
Sounders FC captain, Kasey Keller and midfielder Osvaldo Alonso hoist the 2009 U.S. Open Cup trophy

During the Sounders FC first season in MLS, the club won their first ever U.S. Open Cup title, including any past Sounders franchise. The team was also the first club in modern Open Cup history to win the tournament after playing through a string of qualification propers to enter at the third round proper.

Prior to their first qualification match against Real Salt Lake, Schmid asserted that the Open Cup was extremely critical to the club and that they were playing to win. One of the reasons the club cited, was the opportunity to qualify into the CONCACAF Champions League upon winning the Open Cup title. Sounders FC played U.S. Open Cup home games at the Starfire Sports Complex in Tukwila, Washington. The facility is older and smaller than the club's home stadium for league matches, Qwest Field, but Sounders FC representatives preferred the atmosphere at Starfire for smaller cup matches.

In the first qualification proper, on April 28, 2009; the Sounders defeated Salt Lake 4–1. Sebastian Le Toux scored two goals, and Roger Levesque had three assists in front of a sold-out crowd at Starfire. Sounders FC hosted their second qualification match on May 26, 2009, also at Starfire, this time against the Colorado Rapids. Reserve player Kevin Forrest scored the only goal in the match as Seattle defeated the Rapids 1–0, securing their entry into the third round proper of the official cup competition as one of the eight teams representing MLS.

One of the most unforgettable matches for the Sounders, was the third round proper fixture against their longstanding rivals, the Portland Timbers. Considered their most bitter rival over the past 30 years, it was the first time in four years that any Sounders or Timbers club competed against one another in the Open Cup. Traveling south to Portland, the Sounders claimed it would be one of the toughest matches of the entire tournament. In front of a sold-out crowd on July 1, 2009; the Sounders were able to defeat the Timbers 2–1, thanks to goals from Levesque and Nate Jaqua. The following week, in a quarterfinal match at Starfire, Sounders FC defeated visiting Kansas City 1–0 on a penalty kick in the 89th minute scored by Sebastien Le Toux. Three weeks later, on July 21, Sounders FC won their semifinal match 2–1 over the Houston Dynamo at Starfire. Seattle took the lead for good when Stephen King scored a goal five minutes into extra time, sending Sounders FC to the cup final.

On September 2, 2009, Sounders FC became the second MLS expansion team in league history (Chicago was first) to win the U.S. Open Cup tournament in their first season. They did so by defeating D.C. United 2–1 on the road at RFK Stadium. In winning the U.S. Open Cup tournament, they qualified for the preliminary round of the 2010–11 CONCACAF Champions League.

==== 2010: Second U.S. Open Cup and return to Champions League ====
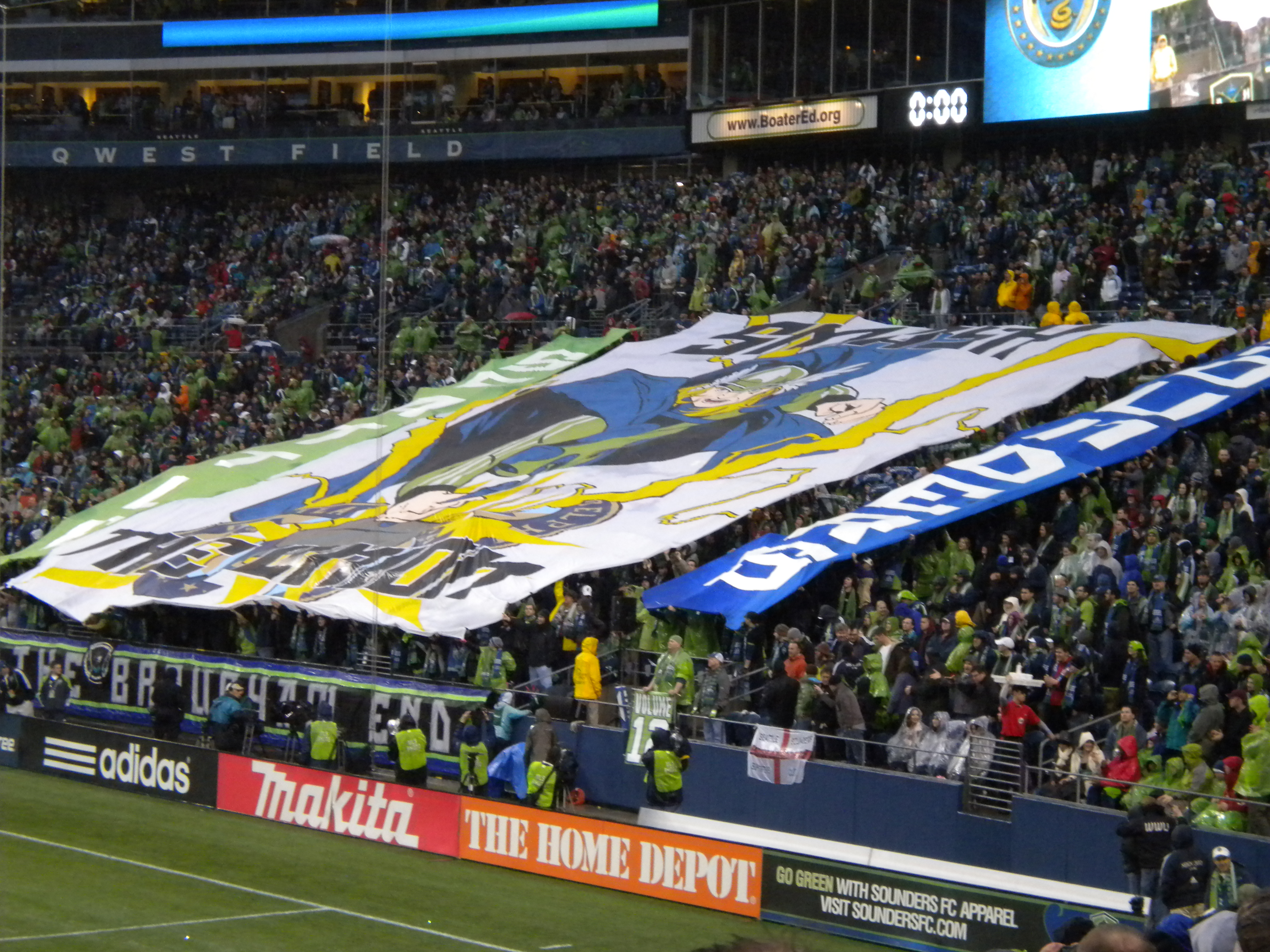
The Emerald City Supporters display their tifo before the first game of the 2010 MLS season at Qwest Field between Seattle Sounders FC and the Philadelphia Union.

For the second consecutive year, the Sounders were chosen to host the opening match of the MLS season, which was held on Thursday, March 25 and nationally televised on ESPN2. Joe Roth, Sounders FC Majority Owner stated, "Being selected to participate in the first match of the season is a testament to the passion and energy of our fans." Their opponent was the expansion franchise Philadelphia Union, the league's 16th team as they played in their inaugural match. Seattle won the match 2–0 with goals scored by Brad Evans in the 12th minute and Freddy Montero in the 43rd minute. The attendance of 36,241 set a team record for an MLS regular-season or postseason game.

2010 started off rough for the Sounders, first with a home loss to New York Red Bulls on April 2, and subsequently relinquishing a two-goal lead against defending MLS Cup champions, Real Salt Lake at Rio Tinto. In spite of knocking off Kansas City's unbeaten streak, the same situation would happen against Dallas, where the Sounders would play to another two-goal draw.

The following week, on April 17, Seattle returned home to face the undefeated Kansas City Wizards. The game appeared to be ending a scoreless tie until late substitute Michael Fucito scored his first career goal in 92nd minute of the match off a throw in from Brad Evans. Sounders FC defeated Kansas City 1–0. The following week, Seattle had two road games in a 4-day period. First they traveled to Frisco, TX to face FC Dallas on April 22. Steve Zakuani and Fredy Montero scored for Sounders FC while Jeff Cunningham scored two penalty kicks for Dallas, the second of which coming in extra time on a questionable call. The Dallas game ended in a 2–2 tie. During the second leg of the road trip on April 25, Sounders FC was defeated 2–0 by Toronto FC at BMO Field. Seattle conceded their first ever goal to Toronto when Dwayne De Rosario scored in the 58th minute. He later assisted O'Brian White on a second goal in the 76th minute.

Sounders FC began May with a tie at home against the Columbus Crew. Steve Zakuani scored an early breakaway goal in the 8th minute to take the lead. However, Seattle's stoppage time problems continued as the Crew's Steven Lenhart scored off a header in the first minute of stoppage time before the half. The game ended 1–1.

The 2010–11 CONCACAF Champions League lineup that defeated Isidro Metapán 1–0 at home

The following week, on May 8, Sounders FC hosted the Los Angeles Galaxy. Seattle's continued inability to score and their recent trend of defensive breakdowns culminated in an embarrassing 4–0 loss to the Galaxy. This was Seattle's worst ever defeat at home and it was played in front of a team record attendance for a regular season match of 36,273 fans. Sounders FC newcomer Miguel Montaño made his debut with the club in the defeat to the Galaxy. The day after the lopsided defeat to Los Angeles, Sounders FC owner Adrian Hanauer announced a refund for all 32,000 season ticket holders for the embarrassment and indicated that changes were in the works for the club.

Three days later, May 26, the team participated in their first friendly match of the season, winning it 3–0 in a shutout against Boca Juniors. Roger Levesque, Pat Noonan and Mike Seamon each scored goals, the latter in his debut for the team. The team ended the month with another 1–0 loss on May 29, this one against the Colorado Rapids, on the road; Conor Casey scored the only goal of the match.

Sounders FC regrouped from the difficult loss to LA the next week when they visited the New York Red Bulls. Fredy Montero's absence from the starting lineup was a surprising change in the match. Montero, however, was subbed on late in the game and provided the winning goal in the 85th minute for a 1–0 victory. During the first game of the 2010 Heritage Cup on May 22, the team lost 1–0 to the San Jose Earthquakes at Qwest. Chris Wondolowski scored 11 minutes in the match, lengthening the "scoring drought" for the Sounders FC at home.

==== 2011: Third U.S. Open Cup ====
On November 22, 2010, Seattle made a trade with the Colorado Rapids for defenders Julien Baudet of France and Danny Earls of the Republic of Ireland for Peter Vagenas. Also, the list of the ten protected players for the 2010 MLS Expansion Draft was decided by the club. The draft took place on November 24, 2010, when both the Portland Timbers and Vancouver Whitecaps FC sectected ten players from the Major League Soccer teams, including Sanna Nyassi (who was later traded to Colorado) and Nathan Sturgis (who was later traded to Toronto) from Seattle Sounders FC. Vancouver later traded Jamaican international O'Brian White to Seattle.

On December 9, 2010, Swedish club, BK Häcken reported that midfielder, Erik Friberg completed a three-year deal with the Seattle Sounders FC. Seattle has completed a deal bringing him over to the Seattle-based club. They also have announced a contract extension with captain Kasey Keller. On December 15, 2010, the Sounders selected Chris Seitz of the Philadelphia Union in the 2010 MLS Re-Entry Draft. The goalkeeper was later traded to FC Dallas for a fourth-round pick of the 2012 MLS SuperDraft. Defender Tyrone Marshall was also selected in the draft by the Colorado Rapids.

The Sounders also competed in two additional competitions during the 2010 season – the CONCACAF Champions League and the U.S. Open Cup. In the Champions League, Seattle progressed through the preliminary round, beating Isidro Metapán 2–1 on aggregate, but was eliminated in the group stage. In the U.S. Open Cup, Seattle won matches at Portland and at home against the Los Angeles Galaxy and Chivas USA before reaching the final, which they hosted at CenturyLink Field against the Columbus Crew. On October 5, 2010, Seattle won the U.S. Open Cup final, 2–1, becoming the first team since 1983 to repeat as U.S. Open Cup champions. The final was played in front of a U.S. Open Cup record crowd of 31,311, and the victory ensured Seattle's return to the Champions League in 2011.

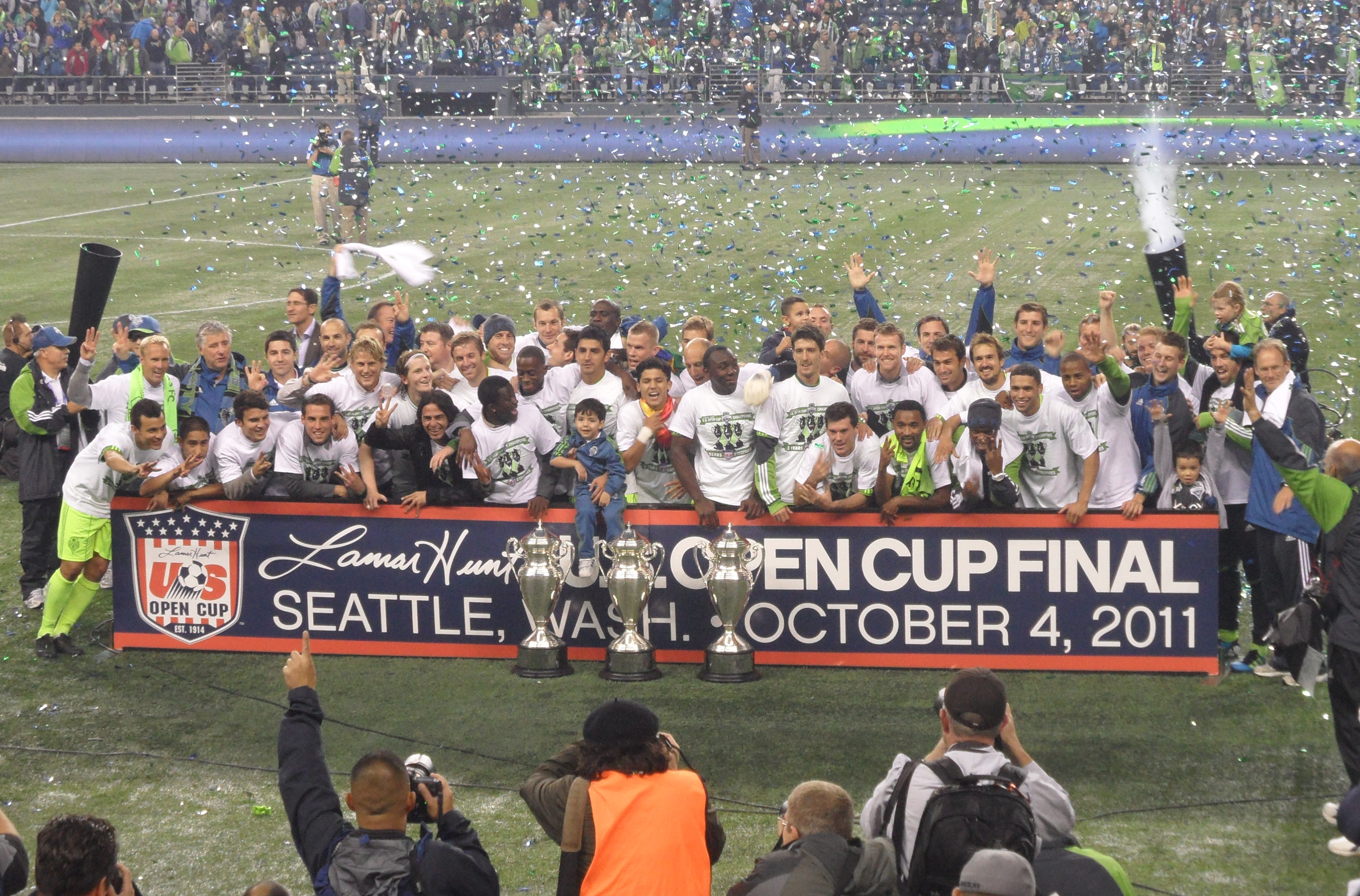
Sounders FC players with the '09, '10, and '11 U.S. Open Cup trophies

The Sounders began the 2011 season by hosting the opening match of the MLS season for the third straight year. The club hosted the Los Angeles Galaxy, and lost 1–0. On April 22, 2011, in a match against the Colorado Rapids, Seattle's star midfielder Steve Zakuani suffered a broken leg in a challenge by the Rapids' Brian Mullan, which ended his season. Despite setbacks and a slow start to the season (the club won just 3 of its first 10 matches), the Sounders went on to finish the season with the second-best record in the league at 18 wins, 9 draws, 7 losses, and qualified for the playoffs for a third consecutive year. On October 4, 2011, Seattle won its third consecutive U.S. Open Cup, becoming the first club to do so in 42 years, as they defeated the Chicago Fire 2–0 in front of another tournament record crowd of 35,615 at CenturyLink Field. In the MLS playoffs, Seattle lost its Western Conference semi-final series 3–2 on aggregate to Real Salt Lake. The club dug itself a hole by losing 3–0 in Salt Lake, and could only net two goals in the second leg at home.

Sounders midfielder Mauro Rosales was recognized by the league as the 2011 Newcomer of the Year. In 2011, Seattle again broke its own league record for average attendance at 38,496. On October 15, 2011, the club hosted the third-largest crowd ever for a single MLS match, as 64,140 attended the final regular season home match. In the 2011–12 CONCACAF Champions League, the club finished second in its group and advanced to the knockout round, which was played starting in March 2012. In champions league group play, Seattle became only the second MLS team in history to win a competitive match in Mexico, defeating CF Monterrey 1–0 on August 23, 2011.

==== 2012: First trophy-less campaign ====
Seattle opened the 2012 season with a run of five straight wins in April and May, but fell into a month-long, nine-match winless streak in June. The winless streak ended in a match on July 7, which saw the return of Steve Zakuani from rehabilitation, against the Colorado Rapids. Seattle reached the U.S. Open Cup Final for the fourth consecutive year, becoming the first team to do so since 1937, but lost to Sporting Kansas City in a penalty shootout after a 1–1 draw. In Champions League group play, the team advanced to the knockout round with four straight wins, each including a goal from Sammy Ochoa. The Sounders finished third in the Western Conference and qualified for the playoffs, where they advanced out of the first round for the first time in the team's history. In the Conference Championship, Seattle fell 3–0 to Los Angeles in the first leg and came within one goal of tying the series on aggregate before letting an away goal, winning the second leg 2–1 but losing 4–2 on aggregate. The 2012 season ended without a major trophy for the Sounders, for the first time in their MLS history, and the team failed to qualify for the 2013–14 CONCACAF Champions League. The top scorer in league play was 28-year-old striker Eddie Johnson, who scored 14 goals in his first season with the club; he earned Comeback Player of the Year honors for his performance, which came after unsuccessful loans to European clubs.

==== 2013: Arrival of Clint Dempsey ====
During the 2013 preseason, the Sounders signed their first homegrown player, right back DeAndre Yedlin, veteran defender Djimi Traoré, and forward Obafemi Martins, who bought his release clause from his Spanish club. Longtime forward Fredy Montero left Seattle on loan to Colombian club Millonarios F.C. in January and, by July, was loaned to Sporting CP in Portugal with an option to buy; Montero was sold permanently to Sporting in 2014. The Sounders began the 2013 season with the knockout round of the 2012–13 Champions League, facing Mexican club Tigres UANL in the quarterfinals. After losing 1–0 in the away leg and conceding an away goal in the return leg, the Sounders scored three unanswered goals in the second half to win 3–1 and advance to the semifinals. With the win, the Sounders became the first MLS team to eliminate a Mexican team in the knockout stage of CONCACAF Champions League. Seattle once again played Santos Laguna in the semifinal, but failed to advance after losing 1–0 at home and drawing 1–1 in Torreón.

The Sounders began the MLS season with a run of five matches without a win, the worst start in the team's history, due to injuries to key players. The Sounders failed to advance in the U.S. Open Cup after losing to second-division Tampa Bay Rowdies in the third round, marking the end of the team's seven-year streak of appearances in the later rounds. As players returned to the team, Seattle improved to a six-win, four-loss record in 14 matches by late June. In August 2013, the Sounders completed the signing of U.S. national team captain Clint Dempsey from Tottenham Hotspur for $9 million, the largest transfer deal in the league's history, and a record salary of $32 million over four years. The team's continued run of wins put them into Supporters' Shield contention in September, coming within one point of the league-leading Red Bulls, but fell to fourth place in the conference after a run of four straight losses in October. The Sounders beat the Colorado Rapids 2–0 in the knockout round, and drew rivals Portland in the conference semifinal. Seattle fell 2–1 to the Timbers in the home leg and were defeated 3–2 in Portland, knocking the Sounders out in a performance that failed to live up to expectations.

The Sounders continued to break the MLS average attendance record for the fourth and fifth consecutive year in 2012 and 2013, with an average of 43,144 and 44,038, respectively. The higher attendances were helped by the opening of additional sections in the Hawks' Nest, as well as the opening of the upper deck of CenturyLink Field for select regular matches. The August 25, 2013, home match against the Portland Timbers drew a crowd of 67,385, the second-largest standalone attendance in league history.

==== 2014: First MLS Supporters' Shield and fourth U.S. Open Cup ====
After a disappointing 2013 season, the Sounders replaced starting goalkeeper Michael Gspurning with Toronto's Stefan Frei. Several veteran players, including Eddie Johnson, Patrick Ianni, Jhon Kennedy Hurtado, Mauro Rosales, and Steve Zakuani, left the club as part of a major restructure; Brad Evans was named as club captain. Marco Pappa, an experienced MLS player and Guatemalan international, was added to the team. Homegrown player DeAndre Yedlin was transferred overseas to Tottenham Hotspur at the end of the season.

The Sounders advanced to the 2014 U.S. Open Cup Final and defeated the Philadelphia Union in extra time, to win their fourth trophy of the tournament. On October 25, 2014, the final game of the 2014 regular season, the Sounders defeated the LA Galaxy 2–0 to secure and win their first Supporters' Shield.

Entering the playoffs as the top seed, Seattle defeated FC Dallas on the away goals rule and advanced to the Western Conference Championship to face the LA Galaxy once again. The Sounders lost on aggregate score and the away goals rule after losing 1–0 away and winning 2–1 at home. LA would go on to win the MLS Cup.

==== 2015 season ====
Former Real Salt Lake general manager Garth Lagerwey was hired by the club in January 2015, replacing Adrian Hanauer.

Seattle was unable to repeat their successes in the 2014 season. The season started successfully, with several key wins that saw the team at the top of the Western Conference by June. During a 2015 Lamar Hunt U.S. Open Cup match against the Portland Timbers on June 16, however, Obafemi Martins left the game with a groin injury and Clint Dempsey was suspended after tearing a referee's pocketbook, though he would be called away for the 2015 CONCACAF Gold Cup.

The injury and suspension of the team's main attacking duo led to a death spiral during the summer, with Seattle winning only one match in nine games. By late August, Martins had recovered and led the team to an 8-match unbeaten streak to secure a playoff spot, finishing 4th in the Western Conference. The Sounders had also successfully topped their group in the 2015–16 CONCACAF Champions League, beating the Vancouver Whitecaps and Club Deportivo Olimpia, with two wins, one draw, and one loss. Paraguayan international Nelson Haedo Valdez was signed as the club's newest designated player, and was joined by fellow international signings Andreas Ivanschitz and Román Torres in August 2015; Erik Friberg also returned to the club after his stint in Europe.

During the playoff's opening knockout round, the Sounders defeated the LA Galaxy 3–2, ending a "curse" for the club, who had lost to LA in each of the three previous playoff matchups. The playoff run would end in the next round, the Western Conference semifinals against FC Dallas, during a penalty shootout after both teams were tied on aggregate score after extra time in Frisco, Texas.

In November 2015, Adrian Hanauer was made majority owner of the club, succeeding Joe Roth. The club set a new attendance record during the 2015 season, with an average attendance of 44,247.

==== 2016: Departure of Schmid ====
Prior to the 2016 season, Obafemi Martins abruptly left the club to sign with Shanghai Greenland Shenhua F.C. in the Chinese Super League, a move that would hamper the Sounders' offense during the season. The move was mitigated somewhat by the signing of homegrown product Jordan Morris. GM Lagerwey also traded Marco Pappa and Lamar Neagle to other clubs in the offseason.

During the first half of the 2016 season, the Sounders failed to meet expectations, placing near the bottom of the league with 6 wins, 12 losses, and 2 draws. After a 3–0 loss on July 24 to Sporting Kansas City, in which the Sounders had only one shot, Schmid left the club on mutual terms.

=== Brian Schmetzer era ===
==== 2016: Comeback and MLS Cup ====
Long-time assistant coach Brian Schmetzer was named interim head coach upon Schmid's departure. The next day, the club announced their signing of Uruguayan midfielder Nicolás Lodeiro on a designated player contract, as well as the return of former designated player Álvaro Fernández. Despite the sluggish start as well as the loss of midfielder Clint Dempsey, who was forced in August to stop playing after evaluations for an irregular heartbeat, the Sounders rose from ninth place to fourth place in the Western Conference and qualified for the 2016 MLS Cup Playoffs, with eight wins, two losses, and four draws. Schmetzer was named as permanent head coach as a result.

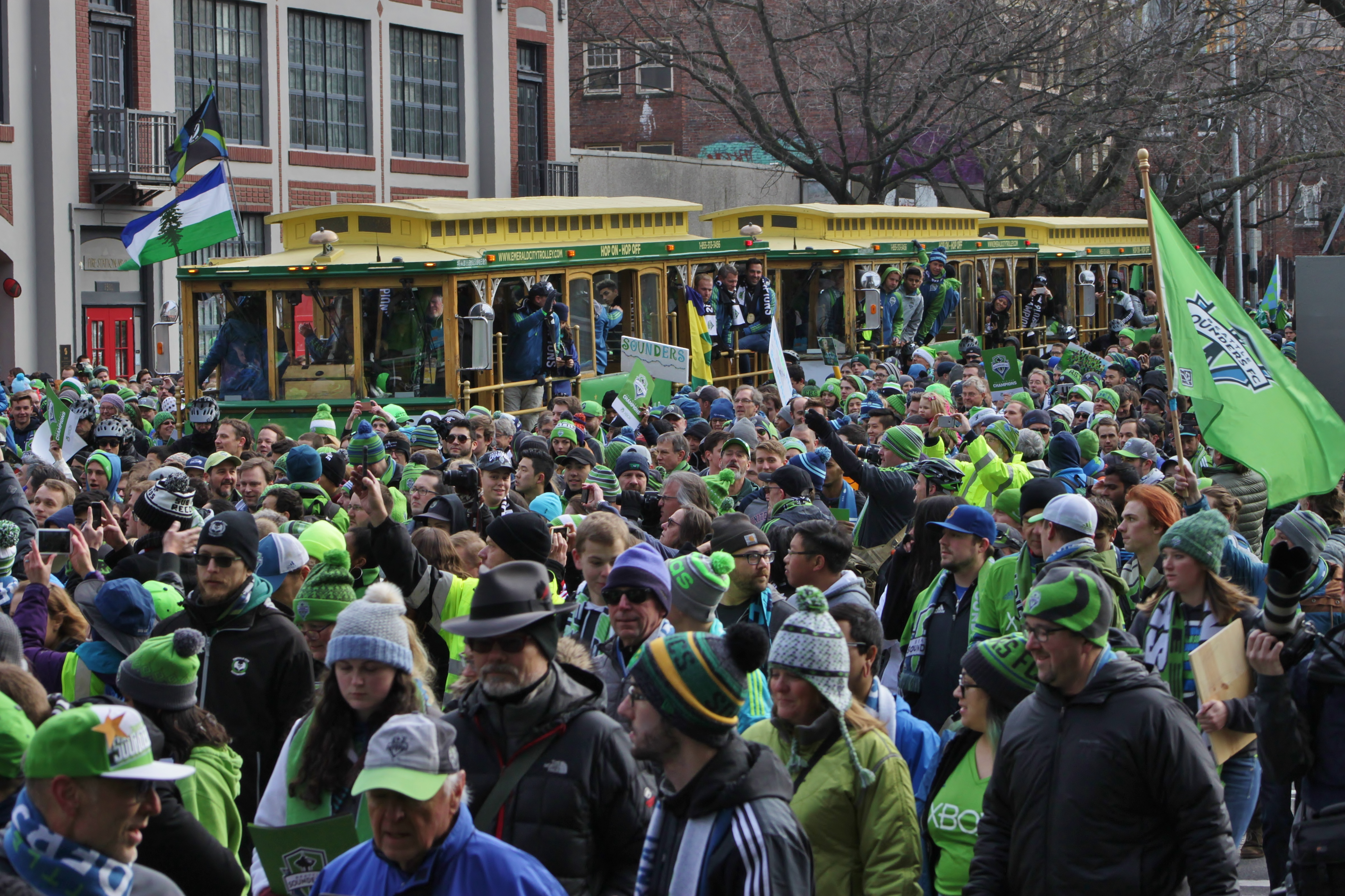
The victory parade for the Sounders after MLS Cup 2016

At the end of the regular season, Jordan Morris was named the MLS Rookie of the Year after scoring the most goals of any American rookie in MLS (12), and Nicolás Lodeiro was named MLS Newcomer of the Year for his 4 goals and 8 assists in 13 appearances. The Sounders advanced from the Knockout Round of the playoffs through a 1–0 win over Sporting Kansas City, and beat FC Dallas 4–2 on aggregate to return to the Conference Final. The Sounders then defeated the Colorado Rapids 3–1 on aggregate in the final, clinching a spot in their first-ever MLS Cup. On December 10, 2016, the Sounders defeated Toronto FC 5–4 in a penalty shootout, to win MLS Cup 2016, their first MLS championship in franchise history, going the whole match without a shot on goal. The team's performance was called a "cinderella season" and hailed as one of the most dramatic MLS seasons to date.

==== 2017: MLS Cup rematch ====
The Sounders began their title defense with the signings of two academy graduates and several veteran players from MLS and abroad. Dempsey also returned from his hiatus and scored in his first match before being called up to the U.S. national team for World Cup qualification. The season began with only five wins in the first 17 matches, but was followed by a 13-match unbeaten streak and additional wins to clinch a second-place spot in the Western Conference. In the playoffs, the Sounders beat the Vancouver Whitecaps and Houston Dynamo to win the Western Conference and return to the MLS Cup, once again facing Toronto at BMO Field. Seattle lost 2–0 to Toronto, who clinched the first domestic treble in MLS history. During the press conference following the loss, Schmetzer publicly set a goal for the Sounders to host an MLS Cup final in Seattle, which would be accomplished two seasons later.

==== 2018: Longest winning streak ====
Seattle began the 2018 season with a run to the quarterfinals of the CONCACAF Champions League, where they lost 3–1 on aggregate to eventual champions C.D. Guadalajara. During the Round of 16, Jordan Morris injured his ACL and was deemed unfit to play for the rest of the season. Without Morris and several injured starting players, the Sounders lost nine of their first 15 matches and were placed bottom of the Western Conference by June. The club signed a new Designated Player, Peruvian forward Raúl Ruidíaz, that month and began a long unbeaten streak that resulted in a playoff position in late August.

On September 1, the club broke the MLS record for most consecutive wins in the post-shootout era, having won eight consecutive matches. They then extended that win streak to nine games as they beat Vancouver 2–1 on September 15, before eventually losing to the Philadelphia Union on September 19. The Sounders finished second in the Western Conference with 18 wins, 11 losses, and 5 draws. With 14 wins in the final 16 matches of the season, the Sounders completed the best half season in league history. Minority owner Paul Allen died from complications related to non-Hodgkin lymphoma on October 15, 2018, leaving his stake in the Sounders to an estate executed by his sister Jody Allen. Seattle then faced the Portland Timbers in the Conference Semifinals, losing the away leg 2–1 and winning the home leg 3–2 to tie the series on aggregate after extra time. In the ensuing penalty shootout, Portland won 4–2; the home leg is considered to be one of the best playoff matches in league history due to its dramatic finish.

==== 2019: Second MLS Cup title ====
The 2019 MLS season began with the loss of team captain and inaugural season player Osvaldo Alonso, who was released into free agency and signed with Minnesota United FC before the season began. Defender Chad Marshall, who had joined in 2014, announced his retirement from professional soccer on May 22, leaving unexpectedly mid-way through the season. Despite the loss of these two players, plus the suspension of Román Torres for ten matches for testing positive for a performance-enhancing substance in August, the Sounders finished 2nd in the Western Conference and 4th in the overall league table, good enough to qualify for a spot in the 2020 CONCACAF Champions' League and a record 11th-straight appearance in the MLS Cup Playoffs.

The Sounders defeated FC Dallas 4–3 in the first round with a hat-trick from Jordan Morris, who had been named MLS Comeback Player of the Year following his return from an ACL tear. The team then won against Real Salt Lake at home and traveled away to play in the Conference Finals against Supporters' Shield winners Los Angeles FC, where they won 3–1. Seattle hosted the MLS Cup final against Toronto FC, playing them for the third time in four years, and won 3–1 to clinch their second championship. The match drew an attendance of 69,274, setting records for the team and any sporting event at CenturyLink Field.

==== 2020: Pandemic and MLS Cup runners-up ====
Seattle opened the 2020 season with the CONCACAF Champions League, where they lost in the round of 16 to C.D. Olimpia in a penalty shootout after a 4–4 aggregate draw. The Sounders played two regular season matches at home before MLS suspended all activities on March 12, 2020, due to the worsening COVID-19 pandemic, which had been affecting the Seattle area for several weeks. The league returned in the MLS is Back Tournament, played in the Orlando area, and the Sounders earned a 1–1–1 record in group play. They advanced to the round of 16, where they lost 4–1 to Los Angeles FC. The team then resumed hosting matches with no spectators at CenturyLink Field (renamed Lumen Field near the end of the season) and primarily played against West Coast teams due to limited travel.

The Sounders cancelled an away match against the LA Galaxy in August to join a multi-sport boycott to protest racial injustice. They later set a franchise record for largest margin of victory with a 7–1 home win against the San Jose Earthquakes on September 10. The team clinched their 12th consecutive playoff berth and finished second in the Western Conference. In the playoffs, the Sounders defeated Los Angeles FC and FC Dallas to host Minnesota United FC in the Western Conference Final. Minnesota took a 2–0 lead in the second half, but Seattle responded with three goals in the final 18 minutes to complete a comeback victory and secure a fourth MLS Cup appearance in five years. The Sounders faced the Columbus Crew in the 2020 MLS Cup final and lost 3–0 in front of 1,500 spectators at Mapfre Stadium on December 12—the latest calendar date to host a league match.

==== 2021: Leagues Cup runners-up ====
Seattle opened the 2021 season with a 13-match unbeaten streak, setting a new MLS record in the process, despite missing Nicolas Lodeiro, Jordan Morris, Stefan Frei, and Raul Ruidiaz to long-term injuries. Manager Brian Schmetzer switched to a 3–5–2 formation that led to only eight conceded goals during the streak. The Sounders retained the Cascadia Cup with a 2–1–1 record, including a 6–2 away victory over the Portland Timbers. The team also won twice against Mexican clubs UANL and Santos Laguna in the 2021 Leagues Cup and advanced to the final, where they lost 3–2 to Club León in Las Vegas. Seattle maintained their first-place position in the Western Conference despite several losses in the summer, but fell into a winless streak over the final six matches of the season to finish second in the West. They qualified for the playoffs but were eliminated in the first round by Real Salt Lake in a penalty shootout.

==== 2022: First CONCACAF Champions League title ====
The team qualified for the 2022 CONCACAF Champions League as the best-performing MLS club without their own berth, replacing the slot reserved for the cancelled U.S. Open Cup. In the round of 16, the Sounders were held to a scoreless draw to F.C. Motagua in Honduras but defeated them 5–0 in the second leg at home. Seattle then faced Club León in a rematch of the Leagues Cup Final, winning 3–0 at home in the first leg and drawing 1–1 in the second leg to advance to the semifinals. The team played MLS Cup 2021 champions New York City FC in the semifinals, winning 3–1 at home in the first leg and drawing 1–1 in the second leg to advance 4–2 on aggregate. The Sounders advance to their first Champions League final to face Mexican club UNAM, who hosted the first leg. The two teams drew 2–2 and returned to Seattle, where the Sounders won 3–0 in front of 68,741, setting a competition attendance record. The Sounders became the first MLS club to win the CONCACAF Champions League with their 5–2 aggregate victory. As CONCACAF champions, Seattle became the first MLS club to qualify for the FIFA Club World Cup.

== Sounders uniform evolution ==
The kits used by various Sounders franchises over the years have varied, but throughout all eras, the team's colors have shifted primarily between shades of blue and green.

=== MLS Era (2009–) ===
==== Home ====
2009	2011–2012	2013–2014	2015	2016–2017	2018–2019	2020–2021	2022–2023

2024–2025	2026–

==== Away ====
2009–2010	2011–2012	2013–2014	2015–2016	2017–2018	2019–2020	2021–2022

2023–2024	2025–2026

==== Third ====
2010–2011	2011–2012	2014–2015	2016–2017	2025–

=== USL-1 Era (2003–2008) ===
==== Light ====
2003	2004–2005	2006	2007–2008

==== Dark ====
2003	2004–2006	2007	2008

=== APSL Era (1994–2002) ===
==== Light ====
1994	1995	1996–1997	1998	1999	2001	2002

==== Dark ====
1994	1995	1996–1997	1998	1999	2001	2002

=== NASL Era (1974–1983) ===
==== Light ====
1974–76	1977	1978–79	1980–82	1983

==== Dark ====
1974–75	1976–77	1978–79	1980–82	1983

=== Sponsorship ===
League	Div	Period	Kit manufacturer	Primary kit sponsor	Secondary kit sponsor
NASL	1	1974–1975	In-house	—	
NASL	1	1976–1977	Adidas	—	
NASL	1	1978–1980	Admiral	—	
NASL	1	1981–1983	Adidas	—	
APSL	2	1994	Nike	Microsoft	Microsoft
A-League	2	1995–1996	Nike	Nike	Microsoft
A-League	2	1997–1998	Nike	United Airlines	—
A-League	2	1999	Nike	—	
A-League	2	2000–2001	Nike	AT&T	Go2Net
A-League	2	2002	Nike	CarToys	Sound Transit
A-League	2	2003	Nike	Go-Today.com	Sound Transit
USL-1	2	2004–2006	Nike	Go-Today.com	Sound Transit
USL-1	2	2007–2008	Nike	U.S. Home Mortgage	Sound Transit
MLS	1	2009–2018	Adidas	Xbox	—
2019	Zulily		Adidas		—
2020	Zulily	WaFd Bank	Adidas		
2021–2022	Zulily	Emerald Queen Casino	Adidas		
2023–present	Providence	Emerald Queen Casino	Adidas		

== Sounders season results ==
The list covers all three incarnations of the club from 1974 (when the NASL Sounders began play) to the present day. After the original Sounders went defunct in 1983, a new phoenix club began play in 1994 and eventually joined the MLS as an expansion franchise for the 2009 MLS season. This list details the club's achievements in senior league and cup competitions, the top scorers and the average attendance for each season. Totals are inclusive of all three iterations of the club. An MLS-specific list of seasons completed can be found at List of Seattle Sounders FC seasons.

=== Key ===
Key to competitions

- Major League Soccer (MLS) – The top-flight of soccer in the United States, established in 1996.
- USL First Division (USL-1) – The second division of soccer in the United States from 2005 through 2009.
- A-League – The second division of soccer in the United States from 1995 through 2004, now defunct.
- American Professional Soccer League (APSL) – The second division of soccer in the United States from 1990 through 1996, now defunct.
- North American Soccer League (NASL) – The top-flight of soccer in the United States from 1968 through 1984, now defunct.
- U.S. Open Cup (USOC) – The premier knockout cup competition in US soccer, first contested in 1914.
- CONCACAF Champions League (CCL) – The premier competition in North American soccer since 1962. It went by the name of Champions' Cup until 2008.

Key to colors and symbols

1st or W	Winners
2nd or RU	Runners-up
3rd	Third place
Last	Last place
♦	League top scorer
	Highest average attendance
Italics	Ongoing competition

Key to league record

- Season = The year and article of the season
- Div = Division/level on pyramid
- League = League name
- Pld = Games played
- W = Games won
- L = Games lost
- D = Games drawn
- GF = Goals for
- GA = Goals against
- GD = Goal difference
- Pts = Points
- PPG = Points per game
- Conf. = Conference position
- Overall = League position

Key to cup record

- DNE = Did not enter
- DNQ = Did not qualify
- NH = Competition not held or canceled
- QR = Qualifying round
- PR = Preliminary round
- GS = Group stage
- R1 = First round
- R2 = Second round
- R3 = Third round
- R4 = Fourth round
- R5 = Fifth round
- Ro16 = Round of 16
- QF = Quarter-finals
- SF = Semi-finals
- F = Final
- RU = Runners-up
- W = Winners

=== Outdoor seasons ===
Season	League											Position		Playoffs	USOC	Continental / Other		Average attendance	Top goalscorer(s)	
Season	Div	League	Pld	W	L	D	GF	GA	GD	Pts	PPG	Conf.	Overall	Playoffs	USOC	Continental / Other		Average attendance	Name(s)	Goals
1974	1	NASL	20	10	7	3	37	17	+20	33	1.65	3rd	5th	DNQ	DNE	DNE		13,434	(England) John Rowlands	10
1975	1	NASL	22	15	7	0	42	28	+14	45	2.05	2nd	3rd	QF	DNE	DNE		16,818	(England) John Rowlands	9
1976	1	NASL	24	14	10	0	40	31	+9	42	1.75	3rd	8th	QF	DNE	DNE		23,828	(Canada) Gordon Wallace	13
1977	1	NASL	26	14	12	0	43	34	+9	42	1.62	5th	8th	RU	DNE	DNE		24,226	(England) Micky Cave	12
1978	1	NASL	30	15	15	0	50	45	+5	45	1.50	7th	12th	R1	DNE	DNE		22,572	(England) Micky Cave	13
1979	1	NASL	30	13	17	0	58	52	+6	39	1.30	10th	17th	DNQ	DNE	DNE		18,998	(England) John Ryan	12
1980	1	NASL	32	25	7	0	74	31	+43	75	2.34	2nd	2nd	QF	DNE	DNE		24,246	(England) Roger Davies	25
1981	1	NASL	32	15	17	0	60	62	−2	45	1.41	4th	15th	R1	DNE	DNE		18,224	(England) Kevin Bond	16
1982	1	NASL	32	18	14	0	72	48	+24	54	1.69	1st	2nd	RU	DNE	DNE		12,359	(England) Peter Ward	18
1983	1	NASL	30	12	18	0	62	61	+1	36	1.20	3rd	9th	DNQ	DNE	DNE		8,181	(United States) Mark Peterson (England) Peter Ward	13
1984–93	No club existed																			
1994	2	APSL	20	14	6	0	38	16	+22	42	2.10	N/A	1st	SF	DNE	DNE		6,347	(United States) Jason Dunn	12
1995	2	A-League	24	18	6	0	40	24	+16	54	2.25	N/A	2nd	W	SF	DNE		4,571	(United States) Chance Fry (United States) Peter Hattrup	11♦
1996	2	A-League	27	16	11	0	35	25	+10	48	1.78	N/A	3rd	W	QF	CONCACAF Champions' Cup	4th	3,750	(United States) Jason Farrell	7
1997	2	A-League	28	18	10	0	42	19	+23	54	1.93	2nd	5th	QF	R2	DNE		2,873	(United States) Mike Gailey	11
1998	2	A-League	28	18	10	0	63	28	+35	54	1.93	2nd	6th	QF	DNQ	DNE		2,902	(United States) Mark Baena	24♦
1999	2	A-League	28	19	9	0	56	36	+20	57	2.04	4th	6th	QF	Ro16	DNE		2,243	(United States) Mark Baena	21♦
2000	2	A-League	28	18	7	3	56	38	+18	57	2.04	3rd	4th	QF	R2	DNE		2,143	(United States) Greg Howes	18♦
2001	2	A-League	26	13	12	1	40	39	+1	40	1.54	5th	11th	DNQ	R2	DNE		1,885	(United States) Leighton O'Brien	11
2002	2	A-League	28	23	4	1	71	27	+44	70	2.50	1st	1st	QF	Ro16	DNE		4,087	(United States) Brian Ching	17
2003	2	A-League	28	16	7	5	45	24	+21	53	1.89	2nd	3rd	SF	QF	DNE		3,357	(United States) Kyle Smith	8
2004	2	A-League	28	13	11	4	40	34	+6	43	1.54	4th	9th	RU	QR1	DNE		2,874	(Brazil) Welton Melo	7
2005	2	USL-1	28	11	6	11	33	25	+8	44	1.57	N/A	4th	W	R3	DNE		2,885	(Brazil) Welton Melo	5
2006	2	USL-1	28	11	13	4	42	48	–6	37	1.32	N/A	7th	DNQ	R3	DNE		3,693	(United States) Cam Weaver	19♦
2007	2	USL-1	28	16	6	6	37	23	+14	54	1.93	N/A	1st	W	SF	DNE		3,396	(France) Sébastien Le Toux	15
2008	2	USL-1	30	10	10	10	37	36	+1	40	1.33	N/A	6th	QF	SF	DNE		3,386	(France) Sébastien Le Toux	19
2009	1	MLS	30	12	7	11	38	29	+9	47	1.57	3rd	4th	QF	W	DNQ		30,943	(Colombia) Fredy Montero	13
2010	1	MLS	30	14	10	6	39	35	+4	48	1.60	4th	6th	QF	W	CONCACAF Champions League	GS	36,173	(Colombia) Fredy Montero	12
2011	1	MLS	34	18	7	9	56	37	+19	63	1.85	2nd	2nd	QF	W	CONCACAF Champions League	QF	38,496	(Colombia) Fredy Montero	18
2012	1	MLS	34	15	8	11	51	33	+18	56	1.65	3rd	7th	SF	RU	CONCACAF Champions League	SF	43,144	(United States) Eddie Johnson (Colombia) Fredy Montero	17
2013	1	MLS	34	15	12	7	42	42	0	52	1.53	4th	6th	QF	R3	DNQ		44,038	(United States) Eddie Johnson	12
2014	1	MLS	34	20	10	4	65	50	+15	64	1.88	1st	1st	SF	W	DNQ		43,734	(Nigeria) Obafemi Martins	19
2015	1	MLS	34	15	13	6	44	36	+8	51	1.50	4th	6th	QF	R4	CONCACAF Champions League	QF	44,245	(Nigeria) Obafemi Martins	15
2016	1	MLS	34	14	14	6	44	43	+1	48	1.41	4th	7th	W	QF	DNQ		42,636	(United States) Jordan Morris	12
2017	1	MLS	34	14	9	11	52	39	+13	53	1.56	2nd	7th	RU	Ro16	DNQ		43,666	(United States) Clint Dempsey	12
2018	1	MLS	34	18	11	5	52	37	+15	59	1.74	2nd	4th	QF	R4	CONCACAF Champions League	QF	40,641	(Peru) Raúl Ruidíaz	13
2019	1	MLS	34	16	10	8	52	49	+3	56	1.64	2nd	4th	W	R4	DNQ		40,247	(Peru) Raúl Ruidíaz	15
2020	1	MLS	22	11	5	6	44	23	+21	39	1.77	2nd	6th	RU	NH	CONCACAF Champions League Campeones Cup MLS is Back Tournament	Ro16 NH Ro16	36,603	(Peru) Raúl Ruidíaz	14
2021	1	MLS	34	17	8	9	53	33	+20	60	1.76	2nd	3rd	R1	NH	Leagues Cup	RU	22,150	(Peru) Raúl Ruidíaz	19
2022	1	MLS	34	12	17	5	47	46	+1	41	1.21	11th	21st	DNQ	R2	CONCACAF Champions League	W	33,607	(Peru) Raúl Ruidíaz (Uruguay) Nicolás Lodeiro	12
2023	1	MLS	34	14	9	11	41	32	+9	53	1.56	2nd	7th	QF	Ro32	Leagues Cup FIFA Club World Cup	GS R2	32,161	(United States) Jordan Morris	14
2024	1	MLS	34	16	9	9	51	35	+16	57	1.68	4th	7th	SF	SF	Leagues Cup	QF	30,754	(United States) Jordan Morris	13
2025	1	MLS	34	15	9	10	58	48	+10	55	1.62	5th	10th	R1	DNQ	CONCACAF Champions League Leagues Cup FIFA Club World Cup	Ro16 W GS	30,993	(United States) Danny Musovski	18

1. Avg. attendance include statistics from league matches only.
2. Top goalscorer(s) includes all goals scored in League, Playoffs, U.S. Open Cup, MLS is Back Tournament, CONCACAF Champions League, FIFA Club World Cup, and other competitive continental matches.
3. Points and PPG have been adjusted from non-traditional to traditional scoring systems for seasons prior to 2003 to more effectively compare historical team performance across seasons.

=== Indoor seasons ===
Season	League							Position		Playoffs	Average attendance
Season	League	Pld	W	L	GF	GA	GD	Conf.	Overall	Playoffs	Average attendance
1975	NASL	2	0	2	8	23	–15	4th	16th	DNQ	N/A
1980–81	NASL	18	9	9	106	98	+8	4th	11th	DNQ	6,751
1981–82	NASL	18	9	9	95	97	–2	4th	7th	QF	6,137
Total	–	38	18	20	209	218	–9	–	–	–	–

== Personnel ==
=== Head coaches ===
Name	Nat.	Years	Record (W–L–T)
John Best	(England)	1974–1976	(39–24–3)
Jimmy Gabriel	(Scotland)	1977–1979	(42–44–0)
Alan Hinton	(England)	1980–1982	(76–56–0)
Laurie Calloway	(England)	1983	(12–18–0)
Alan Hinton	(England)	1994–1995	(34–10–0)
Neil Megson	(United States)	1996–2000	(84–44–3)
Bernie James	(United States)	2001	(13–12–1)
Brian Schmetzer	(United States)	2002–2008	(103–50–45)
Sigi Schmid	(Germany)	2009–2016	(115–79–56)
Brian Schmetzer	(United States)	2016–	(59–36–26)

=== Players ===
Name	Nat.	Years
John Rowlands	(Wales)	1974–1976
Micky Cave	(England)	1977–1980
Bob Donaldson	(Scotland)	1979–1983
Kevin Bond	(England)	1981
Peter Hattrup ¤	(United States)	1984–1989, 1994–1995, 1997–1999, 2001
Marcus Hahnemann ¤	(United States)	1994–1996, 2012–2014
Brian Ching	(United States)	2001–2002
Leighton O'Brien	(United States)	2001–2008
Zach Scott ¤	(United States)	2002–
Roger Levesque ¤	(United States)	2003–2012
Wélton	(Brazil)	2004–2005
Taylor Graham ¤	(United States)	2005, 2007–2011
Sébastien Le Toux ¤	(France)	2007–2009
Kasey Keller	(United States)	2009–2011
Fredy Montero	(Colombia)	2009–2012
Steve Zakuani	(Democratic Republic of the Congo)	2009–2013
Freddie Ljungberg	(Sweden)	2009–2010
Blaise Nkufo	(Switzerland)	2010–2011

¤ Played for two distinct Sounders franchises

== Sounders all-time honors ==
=== International ===
CONCACAF Champions' Cup / CONCACAF Champions League

- Winners (1): 2022
- 4th place (1): 1996
- Semi-finalists (1): 2012–13
- Quarter-finalists (3): 2011–12, 2015–16, 2018

Leagues Cup

- Winners (1) :2025
- Runners-up (1): 2021

=== Domestic ===
U.S. Open Cup

- Winners (4): 2009, 2010, 2011, 2014
- Runners-up (1): 2012

=== League ===
==== MLS ====
MLS Cup Playoffs

- Winners (2): 2016, 2019
- Conference Champions (4): 2016, 2017, 2019, 2020
- Conference Finalists (2): 2012, 2014, 2024
- Conference Semifinalists (6): 2009, 2010, 2011, 2013, 2015, 2018

Supporters' Shield

- Winners (1): 2014
- Runners-up (1): 2011

==== NASL ====
Soccer Bowl

- Runners-up (2): 1977, 1982

Trans-Atlantic Challenge Cup

- Winners (1): 1981

==== USL ====
USL First Division Playoffs

- Winners (4): 1995, 1996, 2005, 2007
- Runners-up (1): 2004

USL Commissioner's Cup (Best USL Regular Season Record)

- Winners (3): 1994, 2002, 2007
- Runners-up (1): 1995

=== Other ===
Cascadia Cup

- Winners (6): 2006, 2007, 2011, 2015, 2018, 2019

Heritage Cup

- Winners (8): 2010, 2011, 2013, 2016, 2017, 2018, 2019, 2020, 2025

== Seattle Reign FC, 2013–present ==
=== History ===
==== Establishment ====
Although Seattle never had a professional women's soccer team in the Women's United Soccer Association nor Women's Professional Soccer (WPS) during either league's existence, the city was home to Seattle Sounders Women, a USL W-League team mainly composed of amateur players that was affiliated with Seattle Sounders FC of Major League Soccer; following news of the imminent demise of WPS in January 2012, a handful of players from the United States women's national soccer team (USWNT) joined the Sounders Women for part of the 2012 W-League season. The Athletic cited the resulting close relationship between the Sounders Women and the United States Soccer Federation (USSF) in conditioning the USWNT players, along with significant fan interest generated during their stint with the team, as major factors that led the USSF to consider Seattle as a viable candidate for a team in a new professional league.

In response to the demise of WPS, the USSF announced in June that it would found a new professional women's soccer league (later named National Women's Soccer League) and invite prospective team owners to submit applications. Bill Predmore, founder and CEO of Seattle-based digital marketing agency, POP, submitted his application pitch for a team tentatively named Seattle Sirens FC. In November 2012, it was confirmed that Predmore's application had been accepted and there would be a Seattle-based women's professional soccer team in 2013. On December 19, 2012, the team name was unveiled as Seattle Reign FC, named in honor of the 1990s Seattle Reign women's basketball team. Amy Carnell, a former general manager of the Sounders Women and Sounders FC's director of youth programs, was named general manager of the Reign.

The team would play their first season at Starfire Stadium in Tukwila, Washington, located approximately 12 miles from downtown Seattle.

==== 2013: Inaugural season ====
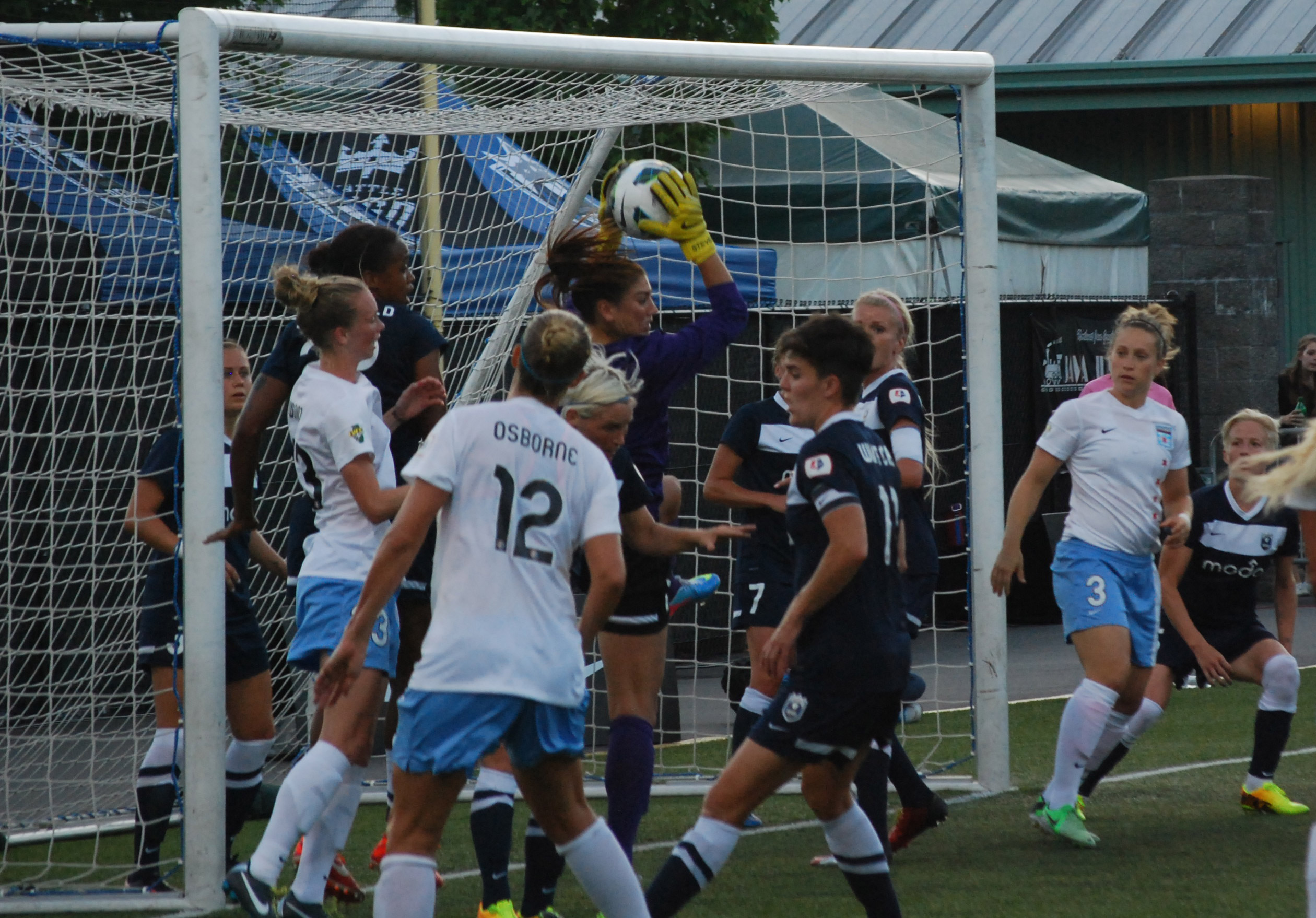
Goalkeeper Hope Solo makes a save during a match against the Chicago Red Stars on July 25, 2013, at Starfire Stadium in Tukwila, Washington.

On December 21, 2012, the team announced Laura Harvey as its first head coach. Harvey was head coach of Arsenal L.F.C. from 2010 to 2012 after serving as an assistant for two years, assisted and then coached Birmingham City L.F.C. from 2002 to 2008, and served as an assistant coach for England's U-17, U-19 and U-23 women's national teams from 2005 to 2011. Before the regular season, Harvey took over as general manager after Amy Carnell resigned.

On January 11, 2013, Kaylyn Kyle, Teresa Noyola, Megan Rapinoe, Amy Rodriguez, Jenny Ruiz, Hope Solo, and Emily Zurrer were named to the team as part of the NWSL Player Allocation. On January 18, the Reign selected Christine Nairn, Mallory Schaffer, Kristen Meier, and Haley Kopmeyer at the 2013 NWSL College Draft. On February 4, 2013, it was announced that the team had signed four free agents: Kate Deines, Jess Fishlock, Tiffany Cameron, and Lindsay Taylor. During the 2013 NWSL Supplemental Draft, the team selected Nikki Krzysik, Lauren Barnes, Laura Heyboer, Liz Bogus, Michelle Betos and Kaley Fountain.

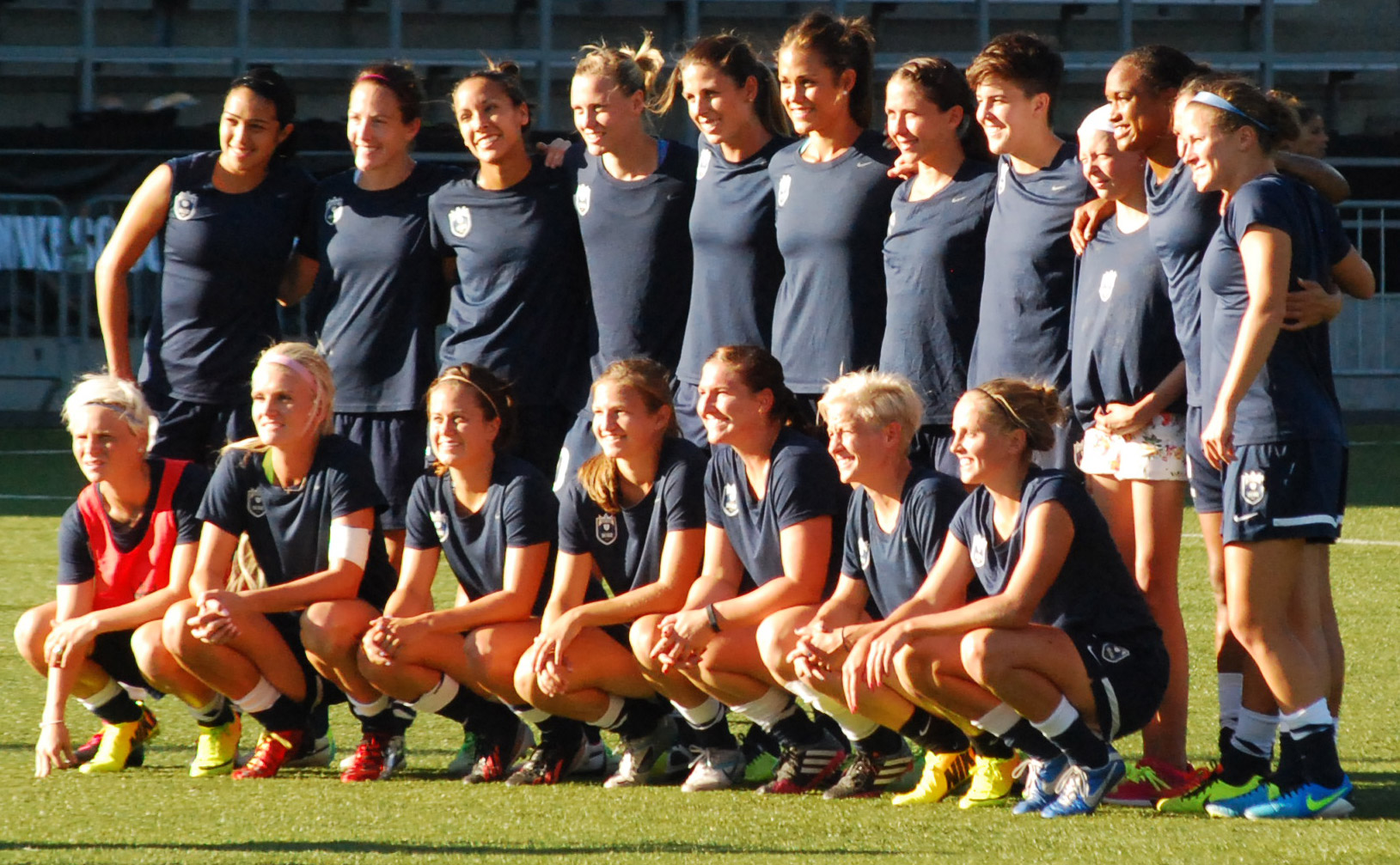
Seattle Reign FC posed for a photo before a match against the Chicago Red Stars on July 25, 2013.

Leading into the preseason, it was learned that the Reign would be without all of their American allocated players for almost half of the season. Amy Rodriguez announced she was pregnant with her first child and would not be playing during the inaugural season. Hope Solo would be away for the first part of the season after recovering from wrist surgery and Megan Rapinoe had already signed with French club Olympique Lyonnais from January to June and would miss at least nine games. After traveling to Japan in the preseason to play matches against defending L. League champion INAC Kobe Leonessa, Fukuoka J. Anclas, and Nojima Stella Kanagawa, the Reign faced their first regular season match against the Chicago Red Stars at Benedictine University, in which Seattle's first college draft pick Christine Nairn scored the Reign's first goal of the season via a header off an assist from Liz Bogus. The point that Seattle earned in the game would be its only for the next nine games.

In June 2013, head coach Laura Harvey began making some trades and signing new international players. With the trades and the return of Solo and Rapinoe, the Reign began to turn the season around with a 1–1 tie against the Western New York Flash. The game would be the first of a six-game undefeated streak for the Reign with two ties and four wins. After losing to regional rival Portland Thorns FC 2–1 in the season finale in front of a sold-out crowd of 3,855, the Reign ended the 2013 NWSL season seventh in the league with a 5–14–3 record.

After the end of the 2013 season, the Reign announced a move to Memorial Stadium on the Seattle Center grounds.

==== 2014 season ====
During the 2014 season, the Reign set a league record unbeaten streak of 16 games. During the 16-game stretch, the Reign compiled a 13–0–3 record. The streak came to an end July 12, 2014, in a match against the Chicago Red Stars that ended 1–0 in favor of the Red Stars. The team finished first in the regular season clinching the NWSL Shield for the first time. After defeating the Washington Spirit 2–1 in the playoff semifinals, the Reign was defeated 2–1 by FC Kansas City during the championship final. Following the regular season, the team earned several league awards. Kim Little won the Golden Boot and Most Valuable Player awards; Laura Harvey was named Coach of the Year; Kendall Fletcher, Jess Fishlock, Little and Nahomi Kawasumi were named to the NWSL Best XI team while goalkeeper Hope Solo and defenders Lauren Barnes and Stephanie Cox were named to the Second XI team.

==== 2015 season ====
The Reign finished the 2015 season in first place clinching the NWSL Shield for the second consecutive time. After defeating the Washington Spirit 3–0 in a playoff semifinal, the Reign was defeated 1–0 by FC Kansas City during the championship final in Portland. Following the regular season, the team earned several league award nominations. Kim Little, Jess Fishlock, and Bev Yanez were nominated for league Most Valuable Player, Laura Harvey was nominated for Coach of the Year; and Lauren Barnes and Kendall Fletcher were nominated for Defender of the Year.

Laura Harvey was ultimately named Coach of the Year for a second consecutive year. Barnes, Little, Yanez, and Fishlock were named to the NWSL Best XI team while Kendall Fletcher, Stephanie Cox, Megan Rapinoe, and Keelin Winters were named to the Second XI team.

==== 2016 season ====
The Reign finished the 2016 season in fifth place with a 8–6–8 record, narrowly missing a playoff spot by two points. The season was complicated by a number of players being unavailable during the early part of the season due to injury including Manon Melis, Jess Fishlock and Megan Rapinoe. In early July, Nahomi Kawasumi returned to the Reign for the first time since the 2014 season and scored a brace in her first match with the team. Rachel Corsie and Haley Kopmeyer suffered injuries during a match in July against the Western New York Flash that was controversially played on a baseball field. Schedule changes from previous years were announced in February that resulted in an imbalance amongst team matchups.

In late August, the Reign announced that Hope Solo was taking a leave of absence for the remainder of the season after being suspended from the U.S. national team. In September, four-year team captain Keelin Winters announced her retirement for the end of the season. On October 17, midfielder Kim Little announced that she would leave the Reign and return to Arsenal. Harvey said Little was given an "incredible offer" of a multi-year contract, though no other details were disclosed.

==== 2017 season ====
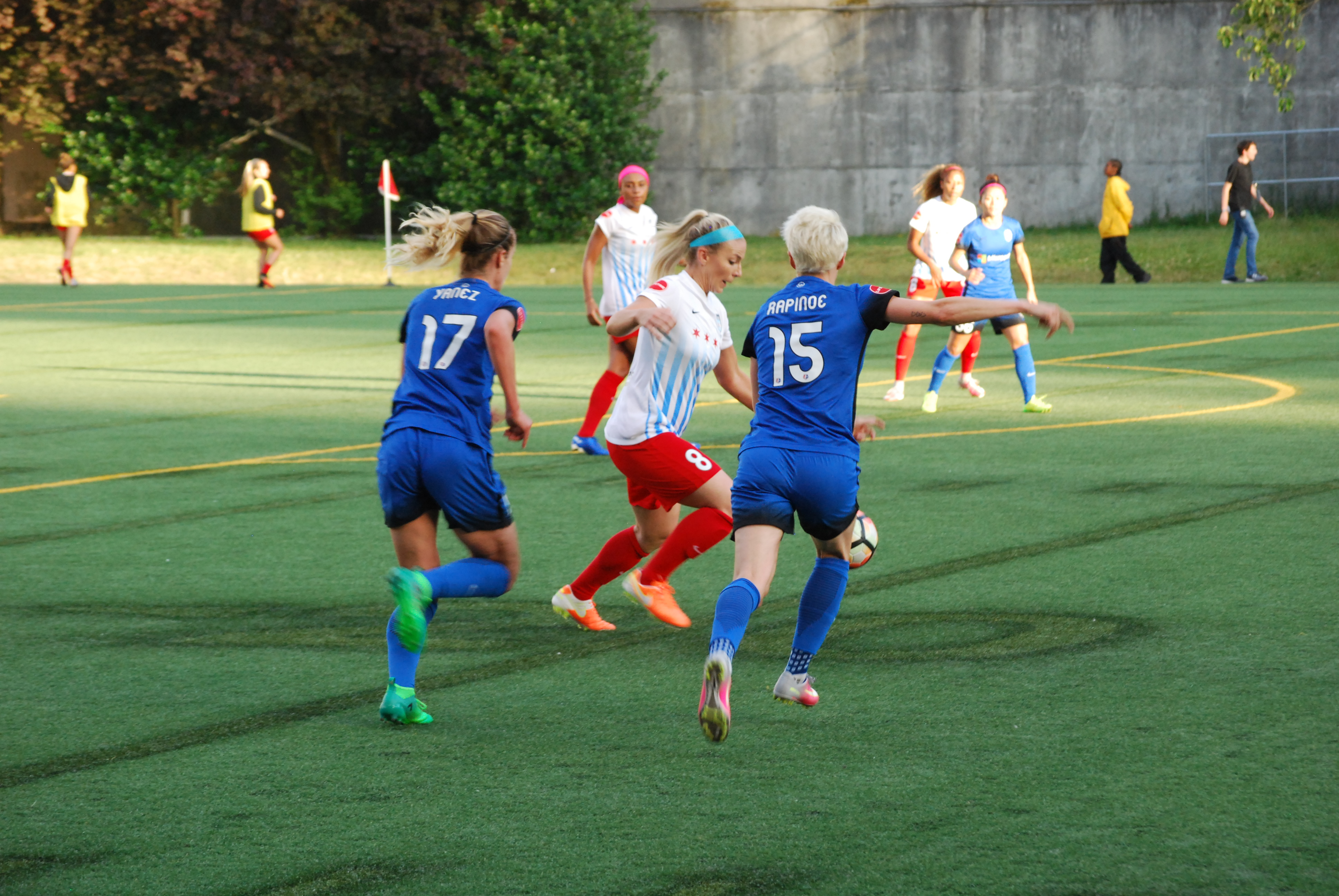
Seattle Reign forwards Beverly Yanez and Megan Rapinoe in a match against the Chicago Red Stars, June 28, 2017.

Following the loss of core players Kim Little and Keelin Winters following the 2016 season, the Reign faced a bit of re-structuring for the 2017 season. Three 2017 NWSL College Draft rookies were signed including defender Maddie Bauer, forward Katie Johnson, and midfielder Kristen McNabb. With Kim Little moving back to Arsenal, the Reign re-signed attacking midfielder Christine Nairn, who had played for the team during its inaugural season. The team also signed Canadian international Diana Matheson and Australian international Larissa Crummer, though they spent the majority of the season injured, as well as New Zealand international defender Rebekah Stott. The Reign finished in fifth place for the second consecutive season narrowly missing a playoff spot after losing 1–0 to Kansas City. Megan Rapinoe was the team's leading scorer (and league's third highest) with 12 goals. Her season performance contributed to her nomination as FIFA World Player of the Year the following year.

==== 2018 season ====
After two consecutive seasons of fifth-place finishes and thus outside of the playoffs, head coach and general manager Laura Harvey stepped down and was replaced by former rival Vlatko Andonovski as new head coach of the team. The amicable transition nonetheless led to new vision for the team and new players, with Andonovski bringing in 11 new players on the season-opening roster. Notably, Andonovski traded for US international Allie Long and Australian international Steph Catley, while English international Jodie Taylor and Danish international Theresa Nielsen joined on free transfers from abroad. The refreshed team performed well throughout the season and remained largely in second place behind a dominant North Carolina Courage team, until a loss to Cascadia rival Portland Thorns FC at the end of the regular season dropped it to third place. This set up a semi-final rematch with the Thorns FC away from home, which the team lost 2–1. Despite the late slide, Andonovski led the team back to the playoffs for the first time since 2015 in his first season in charge.

==== 2019–2021: Stadium search & relocations ====
The club's lease on Memorial Stadium ended after the 2018 season, and the club faced a stadium crisis as that date approached. The stadium, owned by the Seattle School District, dates to the 1940s and does not meet facility standards that were to be enforced by the NWSL and the United States Soccer Federation in 2019. Additionally, the district had announced plans to build a new high school in the area, with the stadium as the most likely site. Eventually, Predmore announced in January 2019 that the club would relocate to Tacoma and rebrand as Reign FC. As part of the move, separate minority stakes in the club were purchased by the ownership group of Minor League Baseball's Tacoma Rainiers, as well as Sounders FC principal owner Adrian Hanauer and his mother. For the 2019 season, Reign FC began play at Cheney Stadium, home to both the Rainiers and the Sounders' reserve side, Tacoma Defiance.

In their first season playing in Tacoma, the Reign finished 4th in the regular season, to qualify for the NWSL Playoffs but were knocked out by the North Carolina Courage in the semi-final.

Soccer games at Cheney Stadium required the repeated conversion of the baseball field to a soccer pitch, which was considered a temporary solution since it was a considerable expense to the Rainiers and required waivers from the NWSL for games to be played there. Thus, even before the announcement of the Reign FC move, the Rainiers and Defiance had already begun planning to build a new 5,000-seat soccer-specific stadium next to Cheney Stadium. This stadium was originally scheduled for completion in 2021, but was pushed back to an indeterminate future date, partially due to the COVID-19 pandemic. Upon moving to Tacoma, the Reign originally planned to move to the new stadium upon its completion solely as a tenant, but subsequently joined the stadium group as a full partner in 2021, and pushed for a change in the plan to 10,000 seats. However, due to the increased costs and lengthier timeline associated with such a change, the Tacoma stadium plan fell out of favor, leaving the team's future location uncertain. Thus, it was announced in December 2021 that the Reign would return to Seattle to begin play at Lumen Field starting with the 2022 season.

==== 2020: New ownership & rebranding ====
OL Groupe, the parent company of top-level French club Olympique Lyonnais, purchased a majority stake in Reign FC in a transaction that closed in January 2020. OL Groupe purchased an 89.5% stake in the side; the Predmores retained 7.5%, and former NBA star Tony Parker, a business partner of OL, purchased 3%. The new owners announced the rebranding of the team as OL Reign on March 5, 2020.

Due to the COVID-19 pandemic, the regular season was cancelled in 2020. Instead, the newly renamed OL Reign took part in the 2020 NWSL Challenge Cup and the NWSL Fall Series.

==== 2021 season ====
Head coach Farid Benstiti resigned in July for undisclosed reasons; a joint investigation by the league and the players' association in December 2022 found that he abused players by "weight-shaming" them. The Reign finished 2nd in the regular season, led first by interim coach Sam Laity and then by Laura Harvey after her return. They fell once again in the semi-final, this time to the eventual champions Washington Spirit.

==== 2022 season ====
The club announced in December 2021 that it would be returning to Seattle with Lumen Field as their new home stadium while continuing to train and operate out of Tacoma. In the Challenge Cup, the Reign finished first in the West Division and earned the top seed overall but lost in the semifinal against the Washington Spirit in a penalty shoot-out. The team also won the mid-season invitational Women's Cup final against Louisville. In their final regular-season match, the Reign won the 2022 NWSL Shield, the team's third.

==== 2023 season ====
The Reign moved their training facility to Starfire Sports. The club will become Starfire's main soccer tenant and operate out of there in 2024, after Seattle Sounders FC moves to their own facility. The team finished the 2023 season as runners-up in the NWSL Championship, losing 2–1 to NJ/NY Gotham FC. At the end of this season, forward Megan Rapinoe announced her retirement after eleven seasons with the club.

==== 2024 season ====
Prior to the 2024 season, it was announced that OL Groupe was putting the team up for sale. With OL ownership inevitably ending, the club returned to its original Seattle Reign FC name. The badge was also changed to an updated version of the original, featuring a gold crown instead of silver. The impending sale of the team created a period of uncertainty, which contributed to the club failing to retain some of the key players who had led them to the prior year's Championship match. Free agents such as USWNT stars Rose Lavelle and Emily Sonnet signed with other teams during the off season. Throughout the 2024 season, the team struggled, and finished with a record of 6–5–15. This left them in the 13th position out of 14 teams, and missing playoffs. In June, it was announced that Seattle Sounders and The Carlyle Group had purchased the team for $58 million.

==== 2025 season ====
After a disappointing prior year, the Seattle Reign FC front office acted to improve the roster of the club. In December 2024, Seattle Reign traded midfielder Jaelin Howell for goalkeeper Cassie Miller and USWNT forward and all-time NWSL leading goalscorer Lynn Biyendolo The team also signed forward Maddie Dahlien, who had just won the NCAA Championship with the North Carolina Tar Heels in the fall of 2024. In July 2025, the club signed Mia Fishel. Fishel had been with Chlesea FC the two years prior, but missed significant playing time during that period due to a torn ACL. Prior to Chelsea, Mia Fishel won the Golden Boot in the 2022 Apertura season of Liga MX Femenil while leading the team to a title.

The roster modifications and continued development of young players led Seattle Reign to improve their performance from the season prior. The team never lost more than two matches in a row, and ended the season with a five-game unbeaten streak. The club finished with a record of 10–9–7, and placed 5th out of 14 teams. Seattle qualified for playoffs, and were matched up again Orlando Pride in the quarterfinals. Orlando beat Seattle 2–0 to eliminate the Reign from the post-season.

Defender Jordyn Bugg was nominated for the FIFA Marta Award for her first professional goal, which was scored from 35 yards out during a match against the North Carolina Courage on March 22. Bugg was also a nominee for NWSL Defender or the year, and made the NWSL Second Best XI. Goalkeeper Claudia Dickey was nominated for NWSL Goalkeeper of the year, and was also named to the Second Best XI. Additionally, forward Maddie Dahlien was a finalist for NWSL Rookie of the Year.

=== Reign season results ===
Seattle Reign FC seasons
Season	NWSL regular season								Playoffs	Top scorer (Note: All official competitions including playoffs, Challenge Cups, Summer Cups, and the 2020 Fall Series.)	Goals	Attendance (Note: Attendance from NWSL regular-season matches only.)		
Season	P	W	L	D	GF	GA	Pts.	Pos.	Playoffs	Top scorer	Goals	Avg.	High	Total
2013	22	5	14	3	22	36	18	7th	DNQ	(United States) Megan Rapinoe	5	2,306	3,855	25,365
2014	24	16	2	6	50	20	54	Shield	Runners-up	(Scotland) Kim Little	17♦	3,632	5,957	43,581
2015	20	13	3	4	41	21	43	Shield	Runners-up	(Scotland) Kim Little (United States) Bev Yanez	10	4,060	6,303	40,595
2016	20	8	6	6	29	21	30	5th	DNQ	(Netherlands) Manon Melis	7	4,602	5,888	46,018
2017	24	9	8	7	43	37	34	5th	DNQ	(United States) Megan Rapinoe	12	4,037	6,041	48,449
2018	24	11	5	8	27	19	41	3rd	Semifinal	(England) Jodie Taylor	9	3,824	5,251	45,885
2019	24	10	6	8	27	27	38	4th	Semifinal	(United States) Bethany Balcer	6	5,213	7,479	62,551
2020	Canceled due to the COVID-19 pandemic								Quarterfinal (Note: Results from the 2020 NWSL Challenge Cup.)	(United States) Bethany Balcer	3	Behind closed doors		
2021	24	13	8	3	37	24	42	2nd	Semifinal	(United States) Bethany Balcer	9	5,240	27,278	62,885
2022	22	11	4	7	32	19	40	Shield	Semifinal	(United States) Bethany Balcer	9	6,844	10,744	75,289
2023	22	9	8	5	29	24	32	4th	Runners-up	(United States) Bethany Balcer (Canada) Jordyn Huitema	7	13,609	42,054	149,704
2024	26	6	15	5	27	44	23	13th	DNQ	(United States) Bethany Balcer	5	8,503	16,598	110,536
2025	26	10	7	9	32	29	39	5th	Quarterfinal	(United States) Emeri Adames (Wales) Jess Fishlock	6	7,870	10,117	102,310

♦	League most for season
bold	Club record

=== Reign honors ===
NWSL Championship

- Runners-up (3): 2014, 2015, 2023

NWSL Shield

- Winners (3): 2014, 2015, 2022

The Women's Cup

- Winners (1): 2022

== Seattle Impact ==
In 2014, the Major Arena Soccer League awarded an expansion to former Tacoma Star player Dion Earl. The Seattle Impact played its inaugural season at the ShoWare Center. However, in January 2015, the team was sold to the semi-professional Tacoma Stars, who completed the season under the Stars' name.

== See also ==
- Gorilla FC
- Seattle Sounders (1974–83)
- Seattle Sounders (1994–2008)
- Seattle Sounders FC results by opponent
- Cascadia Cup
- Sounders–Timbers rivalry
- Sounders–Whitecaps rivalry
