= Seattle Sounders FC results by opponent =

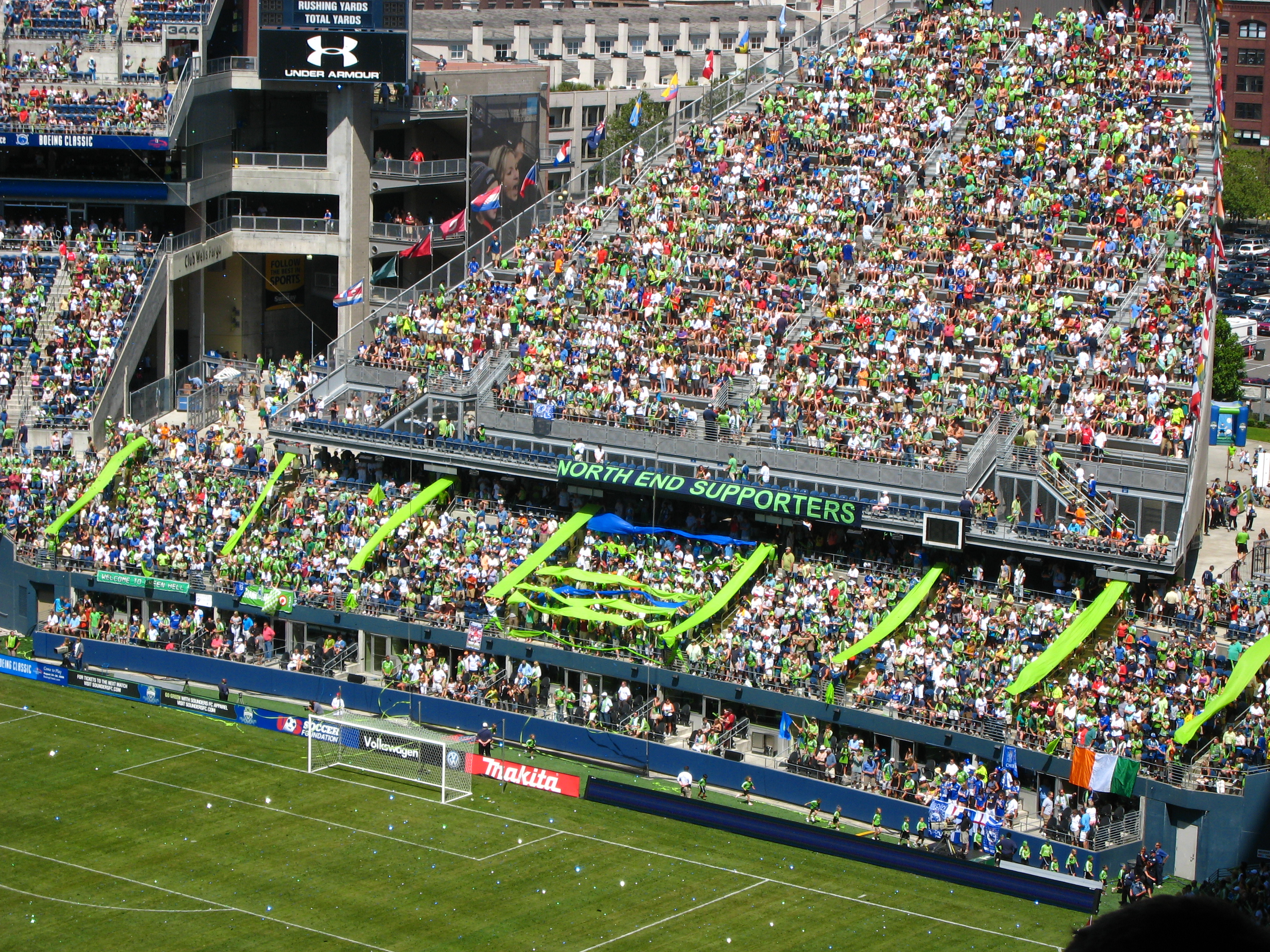
Supporters of Sounders FC before a match against English side Chelsea in July 2009

Seattle Sounders FC is an American soccer club founded in 1974, after the city of Seattle was awarded a Major League Soccer (MLS) franchise. The club began playing competitive soccer in the 2009 Major League Soccer season. It plays its home games at Lumen Field, competing in the Western Conference of the MLS. The current Sounders FC is the third soccer team from Seattle to bear the Sounders nickname. The tradition was started by Seattle's North American Soccer League team in 1974, and continued by the city's United Soccer Leagues side, formed in 1994. The current Sounders FC is an entity distinct to both of these clubs, and played its first MLS game on March 19, 2009, against the New York Red Bulls.

The Sounders record against each club faced in competitive matches, both domestically and internationally, are listed below. As of the 2023 season, there have been six different competitive competitions the Sounders have competed in. These include the MLS regular season, the MLS Cup Playoffs, the U.S. Open Cup, the Leagues Cup, the CONCACAF Champions League, and the FIFA Club World Cup.

== Table key ==
Team competes in Western Conference
Team competes in Eastern Conference

Win %	Denotes the percentage of total matches won against that team
First	Denotes the first season to include a match between the Sounders and that team

== Major League Soccer ==
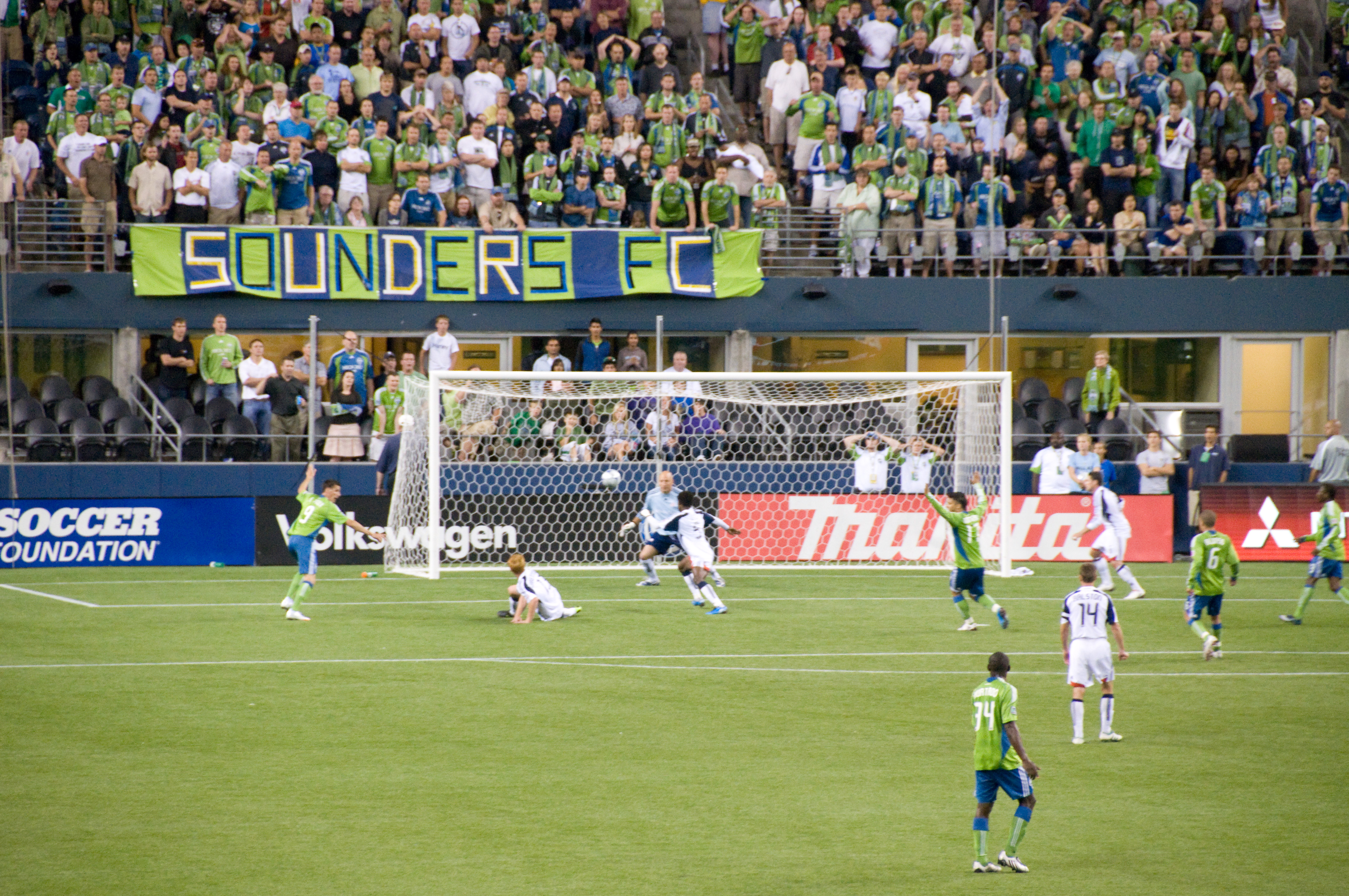
Sounders FC on the offensive against New England Revolution in August 2009

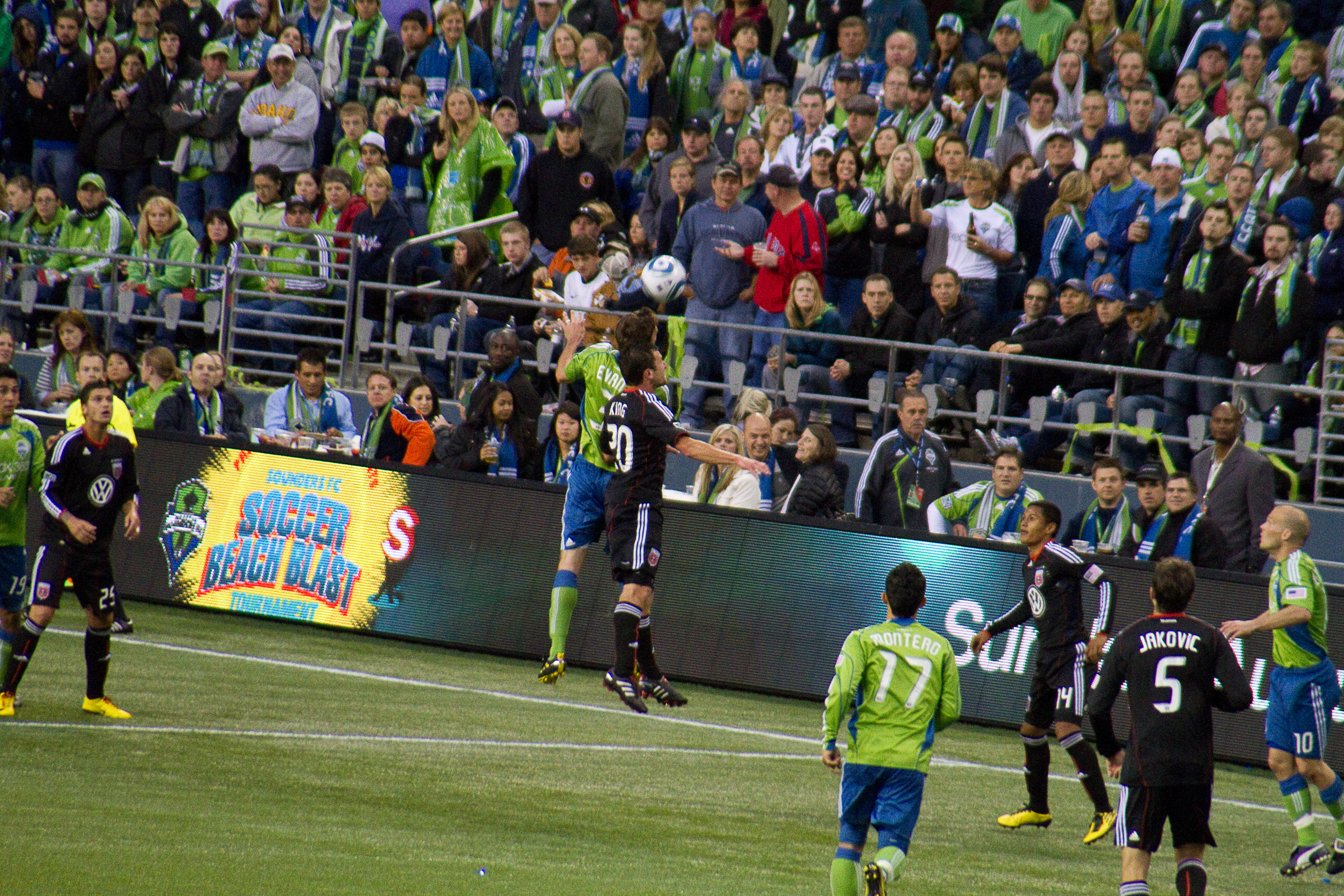
Midfielder Brad Evans challenging for an aerial ball against D.C. United in June 2010

Club^{[B]}	P	W	D	L	P	W	D	L	P	W	D	L	Win %	First	Notes
Club^{[B]}	Home				Away				Total				Win %	First	Notes
Atlanta United FC	3	1	2	0	2	0	1	1	5	1	3	1	20.00	2017	—
Chicago Fire FC	7	5	2	0	9	4	2	3	16	9	4	3	56.25	2009	—
Chivas USA	7	5	2	0	9	5	2	2	16	10	4	2	62.50	2009	Defunct
FC Cincinnati	1	1	0	0	0	0	0	0	1	1	0	0	100.00	2019	—
Colorado Rapids	17	14	1	2	13	8	1	4	30	22	2	6	73.33	2009	—
Columbus Crew SC	8	2	4	2	7	4	1	2	15	6	5	4	40.00	2009	—
FC Dallas	17	13	3	1	16	3	5	8	33	16	8	9	48.48	2009	—
D.C. United	7	5	1	1	8	4	2	2	15	9	3	3	60.00	2009	—
Houston Dynamo FC	13	10	3	0	12	3	4	5	25	13	7	5	52.00	2009	—
Los Angeles FC	2	0	1	1	4	1	0	3	6	1	1	4	16.67	2018	—
LA Galaxy	18	8	5	5	18	3	6	9	36	11	11	14	30.56	2009	—
Minnesota United FC	3	3	0	0	3	2	1	0	6	5	1	0	83.33	2017	—
CF Montreal	3	1	0	2	5	1	1	3	8	2	1	5	25.00	2012	—
New England Revolution	6	3	2	1	7	1	2	4	13	4	4	5	30.77	2009	—
New York City FC	2	1	0	1	3	1	0	2	5	2	0	3	40.00	2015	—
New York Red Bulls	7	5	1	1	7	1	2	4	14	6	3	5	42.86	2009	—
Orlando City SC	3	2	1	0	3	2	0	1	6	4	1	1	66.67	2015	—
Philadelphia Union	6	4	0	2	6	0	3	3	12	4	3	5	33.33	2010	—
Portland Timbers	15	7	3	5	16	4	3	9	31	11	6	14	35.48	2011	—
Real Salt Lake	18	11	3	4	14	2	2	10	32	13	5	14	40.63	2009	—
San Jose Earthquakes	15	8	2	5	12	3	4	5	27	11	6	10	40.74	2009	—
Sporting Kansas City	11	7	2	2	10	4	2	4	21	11	4	6	52.38	2009	—
Toronto FC	9	6	1	2	9	6	1	2	18	12	2	4	66.67	2009	—
Vancouver Whitecaps FC	12	7	1	4	14	5	6	3	26	12	7	7	46.15	2011	—
Nashville SC	1	0	0	1	1	0	0	1	2	0	0	2	0.00	2022	
All statistics are for the MLS regular season and MLS Cup Playoff games only. Correct as of March 7, 2020.

== U.S. Open Cup ==
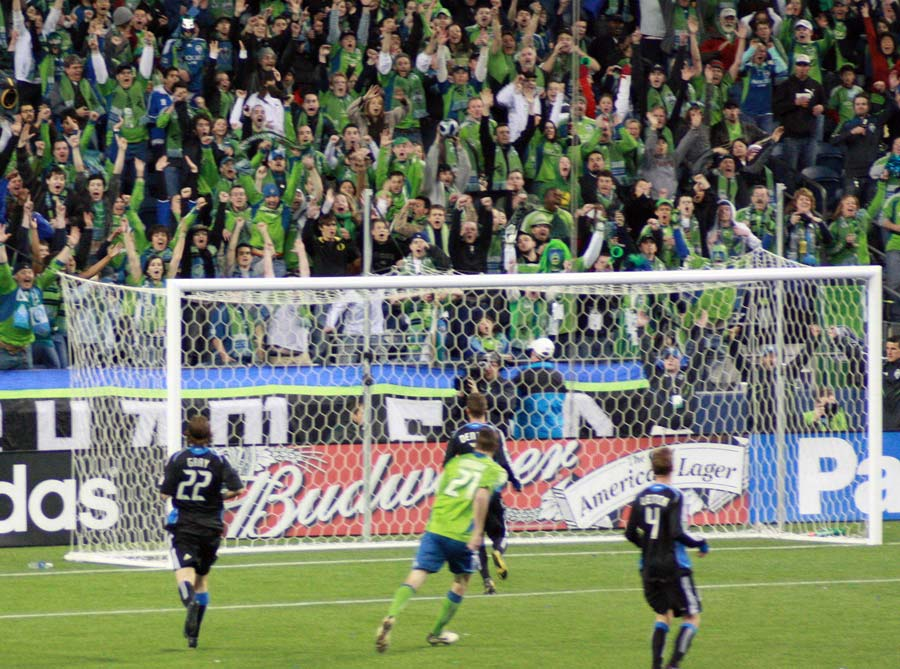
Sounders supporters celebrate a second goal against San Jose Earthquakes in April 2009

The Sounders began their first U.S. Open Cup campaign as a Major League Soccer team in April 2009. The club went on to advance to the final, where they faced D.C. United at RFK Stadium. Two second half goals from Fredy Montero and Roger Levesque won the game 2–1 for Seattle as the club became the second expansion team in MLS history to win the tournament in their inaugural season.

Club^{[B]}	P	W	D	L	P	W	D	L	P	W	D	L	Win %	First	Notes
Club^{[B]}	Home				Away				Total				Win %	First	Notes
Atlanta Silverbacks	1	1	0	0	0	0	0	0	1	1	0	0	100.00	2012	—
Cal FC	1	1	0	0	0	0	0	0	1	1	0	0	100.00	2012	—
Chicago Fire FC	2	2	0	0	0	0	0	0	2	2	0	0	100.00	2011	—
Chivas USA	2	2	0	0	0	0	0	0	2	2	0	0	100.00	2010	—
Colorado Rapids	1	1	0	0	0	0	0	0	1	1	0	0	100.00	2009	—
Columbus Crew SC	1	1	0	0	0	0	0	0	1	1	0	0	100.00	2010	—
FC Dallas	1	1	0	0	0	0	0	0	1	1	0	0	100.00	2011	—
D.C. United	0	0	0	0	1	1	0	0	1	1	0	0	100.00	2009	—
Houston Dynamo FC	1	1	0	0	0	0	0	0	1	1	0	0	100.00	2009	—
Kitsap Pumas	2	2	0	0	0	0	0	0	2	2	0	0	100.00	2011	—
LA Galaxy	2	2	0	0	1	0	0	1	3	2	0	1	66.67	2010	—
Philadelphia Union	0	0	0	0	1	1	0	0	1	1	0	0	100.00	2014	—
Portland Timbers	4	2	0	2	0	0	0	0	4	2	0	2	50.00	2014	—
Portland Timbers (USL)	0	0	0	0	2	2	0	0	2	2	0	0	100.00	2009	—
PSA Elite	1	1	0	0	0	0	0	0	1	1	0	0	100.00	2014	—
Real Salt Lake	1	1	0	0	1	1	0	0	2	2	0	0	100.00	2009	—
Sacramento Republic	0	0	0	0	1	0	0	1	1	0	0	1	0.00	2018	—
San Jose Earthquakes	1	1	0	0	2	1	0	1	3	2	0	1	66.67	2012	—
Sporting Kansas City	1	1	0	0	1	0	1	0	2	1	1	0	50.00	2009	—
Tampa Bay Rowdies	0	0	0	0	1	0	0	1	1	0	0	1	0.00	2013	—
Last updated through the 2019 season.

== CONCACAF Champions League ==
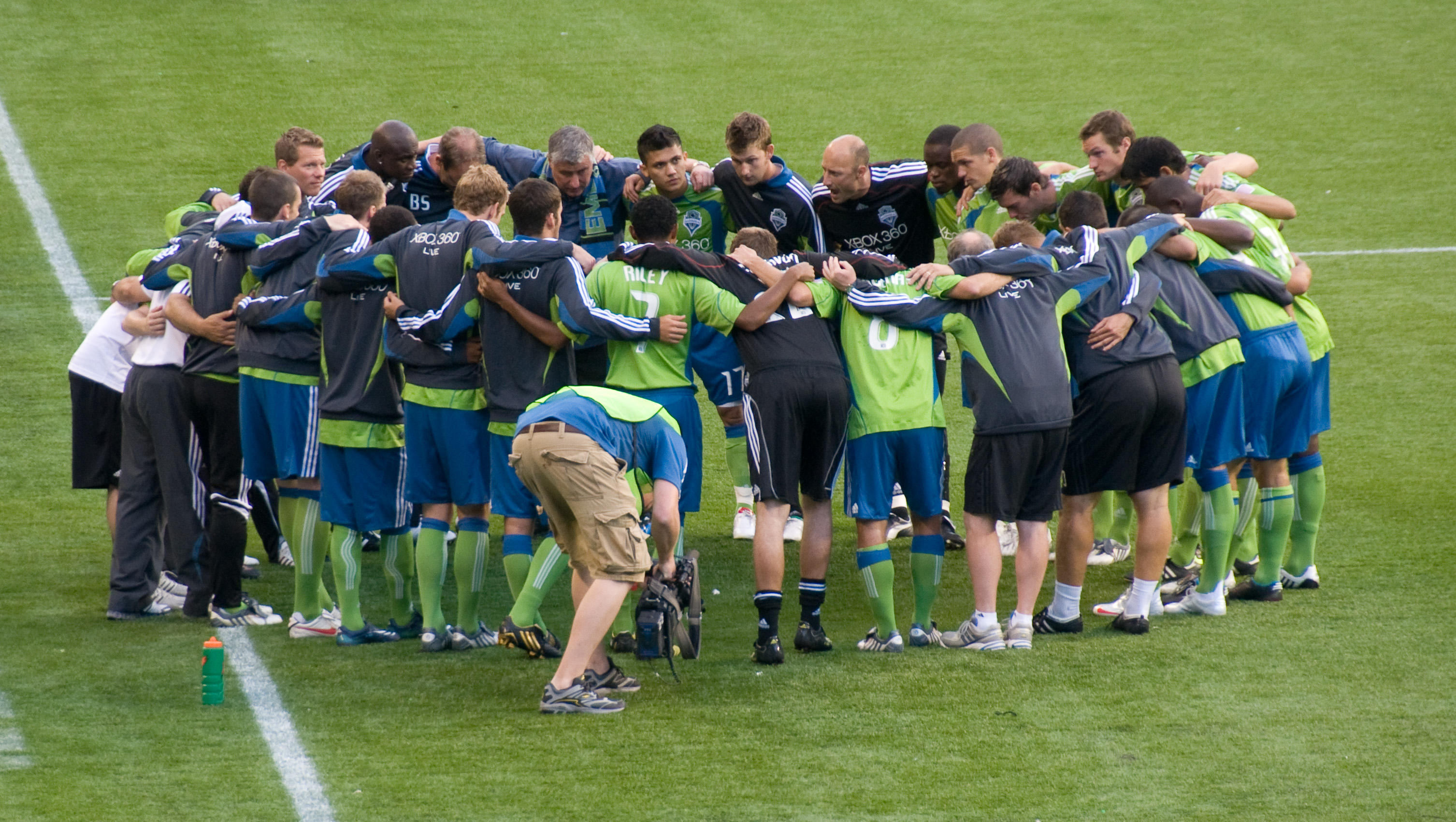
Sounders FC players and coaches huddle before a match in August 2009

The Sounders made their first appearance in the CONCACAF Champions League in only their second season after winning the 2009 U.S. Open Cup. Their first game took place at CenturyLink Field in the preliminary round on July 28, 2010, against Isidro Metapán of El Salvador. The club won the game 1–0, with Fredy Montero scoring the decisive goal. They drew the return match 1–1 to advance to the group stage 2–1 on aggregate.

Club^{[C]}	P	W	D	L	P	W	D	L	P	W	D	L	Win %	First	Notes
Club^{[C]}	Home				Away				Total				Win %	First	Notes
(Trinidad and Tobago) Caledonia AIA	1	1	0	0	1	1	0	0	2	2	0	0	100.00	2012	—
(Canada) Vancouver Whitecaps FC	1	1	0	0	1	0	1	0	2	1	1	0	50.00	2016	—
(Mexico) América	1	0	1	0	1	0	0	1	2	0	1	1	0.00	2016	—
(Mexico) UANL	1	1	0	0	1	0	0	1	2	1	0	1	50.00	2013	—
(Guatemala) Comunicaciones	1	1	0	0	1	0	1	0	2	1	1	0	50.00	2011	—
(Mexico) Guadalajara	1	1	0	0	1	0	0	1	2	1	0	1	50.00	2018	—
(Costa Rica) Herediano	1	0	0	1	1	1	0	0	2	1	0	1	50.00	2011	—
(El Salvador) Isidro Metapán	1	1	0	0	1	0	1	0	2	1	1	0	50.00	2010	—
(Honduras) Marathón	2	2	0	0	2	1	0	1	4	3	0	1	75.00	2010	—
(Honduras) Olimpia	2	1	1	0	2	0	1	1	4	1	2	1	25.00	2016	—
(Mexico) Monterrey	2	0	0	2	2	1	0	1	4	1	0	3	25.00	2010	—
(Panama) San Francisco	1	1	0	0	1	0	0	1	2	1	0	1	50.00	2011	—
(El Salvador) Santa Tecla	1	1	0	0	1	0	0	1	2	1	0	1	50.00	2018	—
(Mexico) Santos Laguna	2	1	0	1	2	0	1	1	4	1	1	2	25.00	2012	—
(Costa Rica) Saprissa	1	0	0	1	1	0	0	1	2	0	0	2	0.00	2010	—
(Honduras) Motagua	1	1	0	0	1	0	1	0	2	1	1	0	50.00	2022	—
(Mexico) Club León	1	1	0	0	1	0	1	0	2	1	1	0	50.00	2022	—
(United States) New York City	1	1	0	0	1	0	1	0	2	1	1	0	50.00	2022	—
(Mexico) Pumas UNAM	1	1	0	0	1	0	1	0	2	1	1	0	50.00	2022	—
Last updated May 11, 2022.

== FIFA Club World Cup ==
The Sounders played in their first FIFA Club World Cup in 2022 following their victory in the CONCACAF Champions League. The club entered in the second round and were eliminated after losing their first match 1–0 to Egypt's Al Ahly.

Club	P	W	D	L	P	W	D	L	P	W	D	L	Win %	First	Notes
Club	Home				Away				Total				Win %	First	Notes
(Egypt) Al Ahly	0	0	0	0	1	0	0	1	1	0	0	1	0.00	2022	—
(Spain) Atlético Madrid	1	0	0	1	0	0	0	0	1	0	0	1	0.00	2025	–
(Brazil) Botafogo	1	0	0	1	0	0	0	0	1	0	0	1	0.00	2025	–
(France) PSG	1	0	0	1	0	0	0	0	1	0	0	1	0.00	2025	–
Last updated August 28, 2025.

== International friendlies ==
Club^{[C]}	P	W	D	L	P	W	D	L	P	W	D	L	Win %	Notes
Club^{[C]}	Home				Away				Total				Win %	Notes
(England) Chelsea	1	0	0	1	0	0	0	0	1	0	0	1	0.00	—
(Spain) Barcelona	1	0	0	1	0	0	0	0	1	0	0	1	0.00	—
(Argentina) Boca Juniors	1	1	0	0	0	0	0	0	1	1	0	0	100.00	—
(Germany) Borussia Dortmund	1	0	0	1	0	0	0	0	1	0	0	1	0.00	—
(Scotland) Celtic	1	0	0	1	0	0	0	0	1	0	0	1	0.00	—
(Mexico) Guadalajara	1	1	0	0	0	0	0	0	1	1	0	0	100.00	—
(England) West Ham United	1	1	0	0	0	0	0	0	1	1	0	0	100.00	—
(England) Manchester United	1	0	0	1	0	0	0	0	1	0	0	1	0.00	—
(England) Tottenham Hotspur	1	0	1	0	0	0	0	0	1	0	1	0	0.00	—
(Mexico) Tijuana	1	0	1	0	0	0	0	0	1	0	1	0	0.00	—
(Mexico) Necaxa	1	0	1	0	0	0	0	0	1	0	1	0	0.00	—
(Germany) Eintracht Frankfurt	1	0	1	0	0	0	0	0	1	0	1	0	0.00	—
(Uruguay) Nacional	1	0	0	1	0	0	0	0	1	0	0	1	0.00	—
Last updated July 7, 2022.

=== World Football Challenge ===
Club^{[C]}	P	W	D	L	P	W	D	L	P	W	D	L	Win %	Notes
Club^{[C]}	Home				Away				Total				Win %	Notes
(England) Chelsea	1	0	0	1	0	0	0	0	1	0	0	1	0.00	—
Last updated July 18, 2012.

== Footnotes ==
A: Includes matches played in the MLS Cup Playoffs and MLS Cup. All results are referenced to ESPN Soccernet, and RSSSF.
B: Includes qualification matches. All results are referenced to United States Soccer Federation, and RSSSF.
C: Includes preliminary round matches. All results are references to ESPN Soccernet, and RSSSF.
