= 2020 OL Reign season =

OL Reign
2020 season
- Majority owner: OL Groupe
- CEO: Bill Predmore
- Head coach: Farid Benstiti
- Stadium: Cheney Stadium
- NWSL: Canceled
- Playoffs: Canceled
- Challenge Cup: Quarter-finals
- Fall Series: 7th of 9
- Top goalscorer: League: Canceled; All: Bethany Balcer (3)
Home colors	Away colors

The 2020 OL Reign season was the team's eighth season of play and their eighth season in the National Women's Soccer League, the top division of women's soccer in the United States. It is the team's first season under new majority owner OL Groupe, the parent company of French soccer clubs Olympique Lyonnais and Olympique Lyonnais Féminin, and the resultant new team name.

After leading the team for the past two seasons, former head coach Vlatko Andonovski departed in October 2019 to become the head coach of the United States women's national soccer team. Frenchman Farid Benstiti was named the third head coach in team history in January 2020.

On March 12, 2020, the preseason match schedule was canceled due to the coronavirus pandemic. As a result, the NWSL announced on March 20 that the regular season start will be delayed.

On May 27, 2020, the NWSL announced that the 2020 Challenge Cup will mark the return to action following the COVID-19 pandemic. The 25-game tournament, to be held from June 27 to July 26, will be hosted by the owner of Utah Royals FC Dell Loy Hansen. Subsequently, OL Reign resumed team preseason training in Missoula, Montana, on June 1.

On June 22, 2020, the NWSL announced, in conjunction with the full rules and regulations for the 2020 Challenge Cup, that the 2020 NWSL regular season and playoffs have been canceled.

On August 25, 2020, the NWSL announced that the season will continue with the Fall Series, where the nine teams are divided into three regional pods and play four games each.

== Team ==
=== Coaching staff ===
Position	Staff
Head Coach	(France) Farid Benstiti
Assistant Coach	(England) Sam Laity
Goalkeeper Coach	(North Macedonia) Ljupčo Kmetovski
Video Analyst	(England) Matt Dorman
Director of High Performance	(Australia) Nick Leman

Last updated: August 14, 2020
Source: https://www.reignfc.com/roster

=== Roster ===
As of October 10, 2020.

No.	Nat.	Name	Date of birth (age)	Since	Previous team	Notes (Note: denotes a season-ending injury.)
Goalkeepers
1	(United States)	Michelle Betos	February 20, 1988 (aged 32)	2018	(Norway) Vålerenga	
26	(United States)	Casey Murphy	April 25, 1996 (aged 23)	2019	(France) Montpellier	
29	(United States)	Carly Nelson	February 11, 1997 (aged 23)	2020	(United States) Utah Utes	STA
Defenders
2	(United States)	Amber Brooks	January 23, 1991 (aged 29)	2020	(Australia) Adelaide United	
3	(United States)	Lauren Barnes (co-captain)	May 31, 1989 (aged 30)	2013	(United States) Philadelphia Independence	LOA
13	(Spain)	Celia Jiménez Delgado	June 20, 1995 (aged 24)	2019	(Sweden) FC Rosengård	INT, LOA
14	(United States)	Steph Cox	April 3, 1986 (aged 34)	2019	Retirement	
16	(United States)	Julia Ashley	November 11, 1996 (aged 23)	2020	(Australia) Adelaide United	
19	(United States)	Kristen McNabb	April 17, 1994 (aged 26)	2017	(United States) Virginia Cavaliers	
23	(United States)	Taylor Smith	December 1, 1993 (aged 26)	2019	(United States) Washington Spirit	
27	(United States)	Sam Hiatt	January 6, 1998 (aged 22)	2020	(United States) Stanford Cardinal	STA
30	(United States)	Machaela George	October 3, 1997 (aged 22)	2020	(United States) Santa Clara Broncos	LOA
33	(United States)	Kimberly Hazlett	March 16, 1998 (aged 22)	2020	(United States) Portland Pilots	STA
99	(United States)	Madison Hammond	November 15, 1997 (aged 22)	2020	(United States) Wake Forest Demon Deacons	
Midfielders
5	(Canada)	Quinn (Note: Until September 2020 known as Rebecca Quinn)	August 11, 1995 (aged 24)	2019	(France) Paris FC	INT, LOA
6	(United States)	Allie Long	August 13, 1987 (aged 32)	2018	(United States) Portland Thorns	FED
10	(Wales)	Jess Fishlock	January 14, 1987 (aged 33)	2013	(England) Bristol Academy	LOA
12	(United States)	Morgan Andrews	March 25, 1995 (aged 25)	2018	(United States) Boston Breakers	
17	(United States)	Dani Weatherholt	March 17, 1994 (aged 26)	2020	(United States) Orlando Pride	
25	(United States)	Kelcie Hedge	September 19, 1997 (aged 22)	2020	(United States) Santa Clara Broncos	
28	(Costa Rica)	Shirley Cruz	August 28, 1985 (aged 34)	2020	(Costa Rica) Alajuelense	INT
31	(New Zealand)	Rosie White	June 6, 1993 (aged 26)	2019	(United States) Chicago Red Stars	INT
Forwards
11	(United States)	Darian Jenkins	January 5, 1995 (aged 25)	2019	(United States) North Carolina Courage	LOA
15	(United States)	Megan Rapinoe (co-captain)	July 5, 1985 (aged 34)	2013	(France) Lyon	FED
18	(Thailand)	Miranda Nild	April 1, 1997 (aged 23)	2020	(Lithuania) Gintra Universitetas	STA
20	(United States)	Sofia Huerta	December 14, 1992 (aged 27)	2020	(Australia) Sydney FC	
21	(Japan)	Nicole Momiki	April 9, 1996 (aged 24)	2020	(Japan) Nippon TV Beleza	LOA
22	(United States)	Jasmyne Spencer	August 27, 1990 (aged 29)	2018	(United States) Orlando Pride	
24	(United States)	Bethany Balcer	March 7, 1997 (aged 23)	2019	(United States) Spring Arbor Cougars	
35	(United States)	Leah Pruitt	September 5, 1997 (aged 22)	2020	(United States) North Carolina Courage	

== Competitions ==
Win Tie Loss

All times are in PT unless otherwise noted.

=== Preseason ===
==== Thorns Spring Invitational ====
March 29, 2020	OL Reign	Canceled	United States U-23	Portland, Oregon
14:30		Report		Stadium: Providence Park

April 1, 2020	OL Reign	Canceled	Chicago Red Stars	Portland, Oregon
17:00		Report		Stadium: Providence Park

April 4, 2020	Portland Thorns FC	Canceled	OL Reign	Portland, Oregon
19:30		Report		Stadium: Providence Park

=== Regular season ===
On February 25, 2020, the NWSL announced the full, 24-game schedule for the regular season. However, the regular season was delayed due to the COVID-19 pandemic. On June 22, 2020, the NWSL announced that the 2020 NWSL regular season and playoffs have been canceled.

=== Playoffs ===
On June 22, 2020, the NWSL announced that the 2020 NWSL regular season and playoffs have been canceled.

=== Challenge Cup ===
==== Preliminary round ====
June 30, 2020	OL Reign	0–0	Sky Blue FC	Herriman, Utah
19:00	Cook (yellow card) 59'	Box; Report		Stadium: Zions Bank Stadium; Referee: Michael Radchuk

July 4, 2020	Houston Dash	2–0	OL Reign	Herriman, Utah
19:00	Mewis 12'; Visalli (yellow card) 47'; Groom 54'	Box; Report	McNabb (yellow card) 83'	Stadium: Zions Bank Stadium; Referee: Lukasz Szpala

July 8, 2020	Utah Royals FC	0–1	OL Reign	Herriman, Utah
9:30		Box; Box	Balcer 90+1'	Stadium: Zions Bank Stadium; Referee: Danielle Chesky

July 13, 2020	OL Reign	0–0	Portland Thorns FC	Herriman, Utah
9:30		Box; Report		Stadium: Zions Bank Stadium; Referee: Tori Penso

===== Preliminary round standings =====
Pos	Team	Pld	W	D	L	GF	GA	GD	Pts
1	North Carolina Courage	4	4	0	0	7	1	+6	12
2	Washington Spirit	4	2	1	1	4	4	0	7
3	OL Reign	4	1	2	1	1	2	−1	5
4	Houston Dash	4	1	1	2	5	6	−1	4
5	Utah Royals FC (H)	4	1	1	2	4	5	−1	4
6	Chicago Red Stars	4	1	1	2	2	3	−1	4 (Note: Chicago Red Stars won the tiebreaker against Sky Blue FC on fewer yellow cards (1 to 4).)
7	Sky Blue FC	4	1	1	2	2	3	−1	4
8	Portland Thorns FC	4	0	3	1	2	3	−1	3

Source: NWSL
Rules for classification: Tiebreakers
(H) Host

==== Knockout round ====
July 18, 2020 Quarter-finals	OL Reign	0–0 (3–4 p)	Chicago Red Stars	Herriman, Utah
19:00	Jenkins (yellow card) 22'	Box; Report	St. Georges (yellow card) 38'	Stadium: Zions Bank Stadium; Referee: Katja Koroleva
	Penalties
	Cruz (penalty missed); Momiki (penalty scored); Jenkins (penalty scored); Balcer (penalty scored); Barnes (penalty missed)		Ertz (penalty scored); DiBernardo (penalty scored); Watt (penalty scored); Hill (penalty scored)

=== Fall Series ===
September 26, 2020	Utah Royals FC	2–2	OL Reign	Sandy, Utah
12:30	Diallo 9'; King 22'	Box; Report	Balcer 23'; White 28' (yellow card) 66'	Stadium: Rio Tinto Stadium; Attendance: 1,302; Referee: Karen Callado

September 30, 2020	Portland Thorns FC	4–1	OL Reign	Portland, Oregon
19:00	Klingenberg (yellow card) 35'; Sinclair 40', 45+5' (pen.), 74'; Rodríguez 57'	Box; Report	Balcer 70'	Stadium: Providence Park; Attendance: 0 Referee: Farhad Dadkho

October 10, 2020	OL Reign	1–2	Portland Thorns FC	Tacoma, Washington
17:00	Long (yellow card) 40'; Brooks 46'; Weatherholt (yellow card) 90+4'	Box; Report	Sinclair 43' (pen.), 73' (pen.)	Stadium: Cheney Stadium; Attendance: 0 Referee: Laura Rodriguez

October 17, 2020	OL Reign	2–0	Utah Royals FC	Tacoma, Washington
17:00	Huerta 24'; McNabb (yellow card) 45+8'; Pruitt 51'; Spencer (yellow card) 90+1'	Box; Report		Stadium: Cheney Stadium; Attendance: 0 Referee: Adorae Monroy

==== Standings ====
Pos	Team	Pld	W	D	L	GF	GA	GD	Pts	Qualification
1	Portland Thorns FC (C)	4	3	1	0	10	3	+7	10	Community Shield
2	Houston Dash	4	3	0	1	12	7	+5	9	Runners-up
3	Washington Spirit	4	2	1	1	5	4	+1	7	Third place
4	Sky Blue FC	4	2	0	2	6	7	−1	6	
5	North Carolina Courage	4	1	2	1	8	10	−2	5	
6	Chicago Red Stars	4	1	1	2	7	7	0	4	
7	OL Reign	4	1	1	2	6	8	−2	4	
8	Orlando Pride	4	0	2	2	5	8	−3	2	
9	Utah Royals FC	4	0	2	2	3	8	−5	2	

Source: NWSL
Rules for classification: Tiebreakers
(C) Champions

== Appearances and goals ==
As of October 18, 2020; only players who have made appearances are listed.

No.	Pos	Nat	Player	Total		Regular season		Playoffs		Challenge Cup		Fall Series	
No.	Pos	Nat	Player	Apps	Goals	Apps	Goals	Apps	Goals	Apps	Goals	Apps	Goals
Goalkeepers:
1	GK	(United States) USA	Michelle Betos	3	0	0	0	0	0	2	0	1	0
26	GK	(United States) USA	Casey Murphy	6	0	0	0	0	0	3	0	3	0
Defenders:
2	DF	(United States) USA	Amber Brooks	8	1	0	0	0	0	4	0	4	1
14	DF	(United States) USA	Steph Cox	8	0	0	0	0	0	4	0	4	0
19	DF	(United States) USA	Kristen McNabb	8	0	0	0	0	0	4	0	4	0
23	DF	(United States) USA	Taylor Smith	7	0	0	0	0	0	1+3	0	2+1	0
27	DF	(United States) USA	Sam Hiatt	1	0	0	0	0	0	0	0	0+1	0
33	DF	(United States) USA	Kim Hazlett	1	0	0	0	0	0	0	0	0+1	0
99	DF	(United States) USA	Madison Hammond	4	0	0	0	0	0	0	0	2+2	0
Midfielders:
6	MF	(United States) USA	Allie Long	6	0	0	0	0	0	3	0	3	0
12	MF	(United States) USA	Morgan Andrews	5	0	0	0	0	0	0+1	0	0+4	0
17	MF	(United States) USA	Dani Weatherholt	7	0	0	0	0	0	2+1	0	2+2	0
28	MF	(Costa Rica) CRC	Shirley Cruz	8	0	0	0	0	0	4	0	4	0
31	MF	(New Zealand) NZL	Rosie White	6	1	0	0	0	0	1+1	0	3+1	1
Forwards:
18	FW	(Thailand) THA	Miranda Nild	2	0	0	0	0	0	0	0	0+2	0
20	FW	(United States) USA	Sofia Huerta	6	1	0	0	0	0	2	0	4	1
22	FW	(United States) USA	Jasmyne Spencer	7	0	0	0	0	0	1+2	0	3+1	0
24	FW	(United States) USA	Bethany Balcer	9	3	0	0	0	0	3+2	1	4	2
35	FW	(United States) USA	Leah Pruitt	4	1	0	0	0	0	0	0	1+3	1
Players who left the team during the season:
3	DF	(United States) USA	Lauren Barnes	4	0	0	0	0	0	4	0	0	0
4	DF	(United States) USA	Alana Cook	3	0	0	0	0	0	3	0	0	0
5	MF	(Canada) CAN	Quinn	4	0	0	0	0	0	2+2	0	0	0
9	FW	(England) ENG	Jodie Taylor	5	0	0	0	0	0	4+1	0	0	0
10	MF	(Wales) WAL	Jess Fishlock	2	0	0	0	0	0	1+1	0	0	0
11	FW	(United States) USA	Darian Jenkins	5	0	0	0	0	0	4+1	0	0	0
13	DF	(Spain) ESP	Celia	4	0	0	0	0	0	2+2	0	0	0
18	FW	(United States) USA	Mariah Lee	1	0	0	0	0	0	0+1	0	0	0
21	FW	(Japan) JPN	Nicole Momiki	5	0	0	0	0	0	1+4	0	0	0
29	DF	(United States) USA	Adrienne Jordan	1	0	0	0	0	0	0+1	0	0	0
Own goals for:

== Transfers ==
For incoming transfers, dates listed are when OL Reign officially signed the players to the roster. Transactions where only the rights to the players are acquired (e.g., draft picks) are not listed. For outgoing transfers, dates listed are when OL Reign officially removed the players from its roster, not when they signed with another team. If a player later signed with another team, her new team will be noted, but the date listed here remains the one when she was officially removed from the OL Reign roster.

=== Transfers in ===
Date	Player	Pos	Signed From	Notes	Ref
January 22, 2020	(United States) Dani Weatherholt	MF	(United States) Orlando Pride	Traded in exchange for the team's natural second-round pick in the 2021 NWSL College Draft	
March 4, 2020	(United States) Julia Ashley	DF	(Australia) Adelaide United	Free	
March 4, 2020	(United States) Amber Brooks	DF	(Australia) Adelaide United	Free	
March 4, 2020	(United States) Sofia Huerta	FW	(Australia) Sydney FC	Free	
March 6, 2020	(United States) Kelcie Hedge	MF	(United States) Santa Clara Broncos	Free	
March 17, 2020	(Costa Rica) Shirley Cruz	MF	(Costa Rica) Alajuelense	Free	
May 22, 2020	(Japan) Nicole Momiki	FW	(Japan) Nippon TV Beleza	Free	
June 1, 2020	(United States) Adrienne Jordan	DF	(England) Birmingham City	Free	
June 23, 2020	(United States) Carly Nelson	GK	(United States) Utah Utes	Signed to short-term agreement	
June 23, 2020	(United States) Machaela George	DF	(United States) Santa Clara Broncos	Signed as National Team Replacement Player	
June 23, 2020	(United States) Madison Hammond	DF	(United States) Wake Forest Demon Deacons	Free	
June 23, 2020	(United States) Mariah Lee	FW	(Switzerland) FF Lugano	Signed to short-term agreement	
June 23, 2020	(United States) Leah Pruitt	FW	(United States) North Carolina Courage	Claimed off waivers	
August 16, 2020	(United States) Rose Lavelle	MF	(United States) Washington Spirit	Traded in exchange for the team's natural first-round pick in the 2022 NWSL Draft, $100,000 in allocation money, and conditional allocation money	
September 4, 2020	(United States) Kimberly Hazlett	DF	(United States) Portland Pilots	Signed to short-term agreement	
September 4, 2020	(United States) Sam Hiatt	DF	(United States) Stanford Cardinal	Signed to short-term agreement	
September 4, 2020	(Thailand) Miranda Nild	FW	(Lithuania) Gintra Universitetas	Signed to short-term agreement	
September 10, 2020	(United States) Carly Nelson	GK	(United States) OL Reign	Signed to short-term agreement	

==== Draft picks ====
Draft picks are not automatically signed to the team roster. Only those who are signed to a contract will be listed as incoming transfers. Only trades involving draft picks and executed on the day of the 2020 NWSL College Draft will be listed in the notes.

Player	Pos	Previous Team	Notes	Ref
(United States) Kelcie Hedge	MF	(United States) Santa Clara Broncos	Round 1, Pick 9 (9th overall)	
(United States) Sam Hiatt	DF	(United States) Stanford Cardinal	Round 4, Pick 6 (33rd overall)	
(United States) Meg Brandt	MF	(United States) Nebraska Cornhuskers	Round 4, Pick 7 (34th overall); pick acquired from Portland Thorns FC in exchange for the rights to Christen Westphal	

=== Transfers out ===
Date	Player	Pos	Destination Team	Notes	Ref
November 4, 2019	(United States) Scout Watson	GK		Team option not exercised	
November 4, 2019	(United States) Jaycie Johnson	FW	(United States) Kansas City	Team option not exercised	
November 4, 2019	(Australia) Lydia Williams	GK	(Australia) Melbourne City	Free	
November 27, 2019	(Denmark) Theresa Nielsen	DF	(Denmark) Brøndby	Free	
January 16, 2020	(United States) Christen Westphal	DF	(United States) Portland Thorns	Traded in exchange for the 34th overall pick in the 2020 NWSL College Draft	
January 17, 2020	(Nigeria) Ifeoma Onumonu	FW	(United States) Sky Blue FC	Traded in exchange for the rights to Julia Ashley	
January 22, 2020	(United States) Schuyler DeBree	DF		Player Elected Leave; retired on June 23	
January 22, 2020	(United States) Morgan Proffitt	MF		Retired	
January 22, 2020	(United States) Addison Steiner	FW		Waived	
February 3, 2020	(United States) Shea Groom	FW	(United States) Houston Dash	Traded, along with Megan Oyster and a conditional second-round pick in the 2022 NWSL Draft, in exchange for the rights to Amber Brooks and Sofia Huerta	
February 3, 2020	(United States) Megan Oyster	DF	(United States) Houston Dash	Traded, along with Shea Groom and a conditional second-round pick in the 2022 NWSL Draft, in exchange for the rights to Amber Brooks and Sofia Huerta	
February 10, 2020	(United States) Bev Yanez	MF	(United States) California Storm	Retired	
February 13, 2020	(United States) Sammy Jo Prudhomme	GK		Waived	
March 4, 2020	(Japan) Rumi Utsugi	MF	(Japan) Tokyo Verdy Beleza	Free	
May 27, 2020	(Australia) Steph Catley	DF	(England) Arsenal	Elected not to return	
July 31, 2020	(United States) Carly Nelson	GK	(United States) OL Reign	Out of contract	
July 31, 2020	(United States) Mariah Lee	FW	(Scotland) Celtic	Out of contract	
August 4, 2020	(England) Jodie Taylor	FW	(France) Lyon	Undisclosed	
August 12, 2020	(United States) Adrienne Jordan	DF	(Spain) UDG Tenerife	Free	
August 18, 2020	(United States) Rose Lavelle	MF	(England) Manchester City	Free	

=== Loans in ===
Start	End	Player	Pos	Parent Team	Notes	Ref
June 16, 2020	July 31, 2020	(United States) Alana Cook	DF	(France) Paris Saint-Germain	For the 2020 NWSL Challenge Cup	

=== Loans out ===
Start	End	Player	Pos	Destination Team	Notes	Ref
November 4, 2019	March 22, 2020	(United States) Lauren Barnes	DF	(Australia) Melbourne City	For the 2019–20 W-League season	
November 4, 2019	March 22, 2020	(Australia) Steph Catley	DF	(Australia) Melbourne City	For the 2019–20 W-League season	
November 5, 2019	March 15, 2020	(United States) Darian Jenkins	FW	(Australia) Melbourne Victory	For the 2019–20 W-League season	
November 7, 2019	March 1, 2020	(Spain) Celia Jiménez Delgado	DF	(Australia) Perth Glory	For the 2019–20 W-League season	
November 7, 2019	March 1, 2020	(United States) Morgan Andrews	MF	(Australia) Perth Glory	For the 2019–20 W-League season	
August 12, 2020	December 31, 2020	(Canada) Quinn	MF	(Sweden) Vittsjö		
August 14, 2020	November 30, 2020	(United States) Lauren Barnes	DF	(Sweden) Kristianstad		
August 14, 2020	November 30, 2020	(Japan) Nicole Momiki	FW	(Sweden) Linköping		
August 19, 2020	April 5, 2021	(Wales) Jess Fishlock	MF	(England) Reading		
August 28, 2020	December 31, 2020	(United States) Machaela George	DF	(Denmark) Fortuna Hjørring		
August 28, 2020	February 28, 2021	(United States) Darian Jenkins	FW	(France) Bordeaux		
September 23, 2020	February 28, 2021	(Spain) Celia Jiménez Delgado	DF	(France) Lyon		

=== New contracts ===
Date	Player	Pos	Notes	Ref
November 4, 2019	(United States) Sammy Jo Prudhomme	GK	Team option exercised	
November 4, 2019	(United States) Casey Murphy	GK	Team option exercised	
November 4, 2019	(Australia) Steph Catley	DF	Team option exercised	
November 4, 2019	(United States) Steph Cox	DF	Team option exercised	
November 4, 2019	(United States) Schuyler DeBree	DF	Team option exercised	
November 4, 2019	(Spain) Celia Jiménez Delgado	DF	Team option exercised	
November 4, 2019	(United States) Kristen McNabb	DF	Team option exercised	
November 4, 2019	(United States) Megan Oyster	DF	Team option exercised	
November 4, 2019	(United States) Taylor Smith	DF	Team option exercised	
November 4, 2019	(United States) Morgan Andrews	MF	Team option exercised	
November 4, 2019	(United States) Allie Long	MF	Team option exercised	
November 4, 2019	(Canada) Quinn	MF	Team option exercised	
November 4, 2019	(New Zealand) Rosie White	MF	Team option exercised	
November 4, 2019	(United States) Bev Yanez	MF	Team option exercised	
November 4, 2019	(United States) Morgan Proffitt	MF	Team option exercised	
November 4, 2019	(United States) Shea Groom	FW	Team option exercised	
November 4, 2019	(United States) Darian Jenkins	FW	Team option exercised	
November 4, 2019	(United States) Megan Rapinoe	FW	Team option exercised	
November 4, 2019	(United States) Addison Steiner	FW	Team option exercised	
November 4, 2019	(England) Jodie Taylor	FW	Team option exercised	
November 4, 2019	(United States) Bethany Balcer	FW	Team option exercised	
November 4, 2019	(Nigeria) Ifeoma Onumonu	FW	Team option exercised	
November 4, 2019	(United States) Jasmyne Spencer	FW	Team option exercised	
January 22, 2020	(England) Jodie Taylor	FW	Signed to a new contract	
February 10, 2020	(Wales) Jess Fishlock	MF	Re-signed	
February 13, 2020	(United States) Lauren Barnes	DF	Re-signed	
February 25, 2020	(United States) Bethany Balcer	FW	Signed to a new contract	
March 5, 2020	(United States) Michelle Betos	GK	Re-signed	
August 12, 2020	(United States) Machaela George	DF	Signed to a standard contract	
August 12, 2020	(Canada) Quinn	MF	Signed to a new contract	
August 28, 2020	(United States) Darian Jenkins	FW	Re-signed	

== Awards ==
=== FIFA FIFPro Women's World 11 ===
- Megan Rapinoe: World 11
- Shirley Cruz: shortlisted

=== BBC Women's Footballer of the Year ===
- Megan Rapinoe (nominee)

=== Women's International Champions Cup ===
- Best XI: Megan Rapinoe
