= 2019 Reign FC season =

Reign FC
2019 season
- Majority owners: Bill and Teresa Predmore
- President: Bill Predmore
- Head coach: Vlatko Andonovski
- Stadium: Cheney Stadium
- NWSL: 4th
- Playoffs: Semi-finals
- Top goalscorer: League: Bethany Balcer (6); All: Bethany Balcer (6)
- Highest home attendance: 7,479 (July 28 vs. CHI)
- Lowest home attendance: 3,032 (May 27 vs. NC)
- Average home league attendance: 5,213
Home colors	Away colors

The 2019 Reign FC season was the club's seventh season of play and their seventh season in the National Women's Soccer League, the top division of women's soccer in the United States. It was the club's first season playing in Tacoma, Washington, following the relocation from Seattle; the 2019 season was also their first under their new name after they were rebranded from Seattle Reign FC.

It was the NWSL's first season with the increased standard roster size from 20 to 22. In addition, there were now four supplemental roster spots for players making the minimum salary that do not count against the team salary cap. Teams were required to carry at least 20 players at any given time and could carry as many as 26 players.

== Club ==
=== Coaching staff ===
Position	Staff
Head Coach	(North Macedonia) Vlatko Andonovski
Assistant Coach	(England) Sam Laity
Assistant Coach	(Serbia) Milan Ivanovic
Goalkeeper Coach	(North Macedonia) Ljupco Kmetovski-Rakush
Director of High Performance	(Australia) Nick Leman

Last updated: June 14, 2019
Source: https://www.reignfc.com/roster

=== Roster ===
As of September 17, 2019.

No.	Nat.	Name	Date of birth (age)	Since	Previous club	Notes (Note: denotes a season-ending injury.)
Goalkeepers
1	(Australia)	Lydia Williams	May 13, 1988 (aged 30)	2017	(United States) Houston Dash	
18	(United States)	Michelle Betos	February 20, 1988 (aged 31)	2018	(Norway) Vålerenga	
26	(United States)	Casey Murphy	April 25, 1996 (aged 22)	2019	(France) Montpellier HSC	
28	(United States)	Sammy Jo Prudhomme	October 25, 1993 (aged 25)	2019	(United States) Washington Spirit	
29	(United States)	Scout Watson	May 1, 1996 (aged 22)	2019	(United States) Colorado Buffaloes	NTR
Defenders
3	(United States)	Lauren Barnes (co-captain)	May 31, 1989 (aged 29)	2013	(United States) Philadelphia Independence	
4	(United States)	Megan Oyster	September 3, 1992 (aged 26)	2018	(United States) Boston Breakers	
7	(Australia)	Steph Catley	January 26, 1994 (aged 25)	2018	(Australia) Melbourne City	INT
8	(Denmark)	Theresa Nielsen	July 20, 1986 (aged 32)	2018	(Norway) Vålerenga	INT
13	(Spain)	Celia Jiménez Delgado	June 20, 1995 (aged 23)	2019	(Sweden) FC Rosengård	INT
19	(United States)	Kristen McNabb	April 17, 1994 (aged 24)	2017	(United States) Virginia Cavaliers	
21	(United States)	Christen Westphal	September 2, 1993 (aged 25)	2018	(United States) Boston Breakers	
23	(United States)	Taylor Smith	December 1, 1993 (aged 25)	2019	(United States) Washington Spirit	SUP
33	(United States)	Stephanie Cox	April 3, 1986 (aged 33)	2019	Retirement	
35	(United States)	Schuyler DeBree	September 5, 1996 (aged 22)	2019	(Czech Republic) AC Sparta Praha	
Midfielders
5	(Canada)	Quinn (Note: Then known as Rebecca Quinn)	August 11, 1995 (aged 23)	2019	(France) Paris FC	INT
6	(United States)	Allie Long	August 13, 1987 (aged 31)	2018	(United States) Portland Thorns	FED
10	(Wales)	Jess Fishlock	January 14, 1987 (aged 32)	2013	(England) Bristol Academy	
12	(United States)	Morgan Andrews	March 25, 1995 (aged 24)	2018	(United States) Boston Breakers	
14	(United States)	Morgan Proffitt	August 22, 1994 (aged 24)	2019	(Czech Republic) Slavia Praha	SUP
17	(United States)	Bev Yanez	July 19, 1988 (aged 30)	2014	(Japan) INAC Kobe Leonessa	
20	(Japan)	Rumi Utsugi	December 5, 1988 (aged 30)	2016	(France) Montpellier HSC	
31	(New Zealand)	Rosie White	June 6, 1993 (aged 25)	2019	(United States) Chicago Red Stars	INT
Forwards
2	(United States)	Shea Groom	March 4, 1993 (aged 26)	2019	(United States) Sky Blue FC	
9	(England)	Jodie Taylor	May 17, 1986 (aged 32)	2018	(England) Arsenal	
11	(United States)	Darian Jenkins	January 5, 1995 (aged 24)	2019	(United States) North Carolina Courage	
15	(United States)	Megan Rapinoe (co-captain)	July 5, 1985 (aged 33)	2013	(France) Lyon	FED
16	(United States)	Jaycie Johnson	April 18, 1995 (aged 23)	2018	(United States) Nebraska Cornhuskers	SUP
22	(United States)	Jasmyne Spencer	August 27, 1990 (aged 28)	2018	(United States) Orlando Pride	
24	(United States)	Bethany Balcer	March 7, 1997 (aged 22)	2019	(United States) Spring Arbor Cougars	SUP
25	(Nigeria)	Ifeoma Onumonu	February 25, 1994 (aged 25)	2019	(United States) Portland Thorns	SUP
27	(United States)	Addison Steiner	December 19, 1994 (aged 24)	2019	(Sweden) KIF Örebro	SUP

== Competitions ==
Win Tie Loss

All times are in PT unless otherwise noted.

=== Preseason ===
March 16, 2019	UCLA Bruins	0–2	Reign FC	Norco, California
12:00		Report	3' (o.g.); Jenkins 19'	Stadium: SilverLakes Soccer Complex

April 5, 2019	Washington Huskies	0–5	Reign FC	Seattle, Washington
19:30	Castro (yellow card) 62'	Report	Spencer 15'; McNabb 20'; Groom 38'; Balcer 60', 65'; Andrews (yellow card) 70'	Stadium: Husky Soccer Stadium

==== Thorns Spring Invitational ====
March 24, 2019	Reign FC	2–1	United States U-23	Portland, Oregon
11:30	Jenkins 49'; Long 70'	Report	Sanchez 54'	Stadium: Merlo Field

March 27, 2019	Reign FC	2–1	Chicago Red Stars	Portland, Oregon
13:30	Andrews 38'; Theresa 64'; Baucom (yellow card) 90+3'	Report	Johnson 5'; Sharples (yellow card) 90+1'	Stadium: Merlo Field

March 30, 2019	Portland Thorns FC	0–0	Reign FC	Portland, Oregon
19:30		Report		Stadium: Merlo Field

=== Regular season ===
April 14, 2019 1	Houston Dash	1–1	Reign FC	Houston, Texas
15:00	Prince 10'; Schmidt (yellow card) 67'; Nairn (yellow card) 90+3'	Box; Report	Jenkins 58'; McNabb (yellow card) 79'	Stadium: BBVA Compass Stadium; Attendance: 4,335; Referee: Karen ABT

April 21, 2019 2	Reign FC	1–1	Orlando Pride	Tacoma, Washington
19:00	Balcer 21'	Box; Report	Kennedy 6' van Egmond (yellow card) 58'; Morgan (yellow card) 90+2'	Stadium: Cheney Stadium; Attendance: 5,323; Referee: Reyna Fonesca

April 28, 2019 3	Chicago Red Stars	3–0	Reign FC	Bridgeview, Illinois
10:00	Short 13'; Nagasato 53'; Ertz (yellow card) 68'; Elby 89'	Box; Report		Stadium: SeatGeek Stadium; Attendance: 2,804; Referee: Danielle Chesky

May 4, 2019 4	Washington Spirit	0–0	Reign FC	Boyds, Maryland
16:00	Matthews (yellow card) 86'	Box; Report	Barnes (yellow card) 89'	Stadium: Maryland SoccerPlex; Attendance: 2,097; Referee: Jasmine Peralta

May 18, 2019 5	Reign FC	2–1	Sky Blue FC	Tacoma, Washington
13:00	James 13' (o.g.); Taylor 78'; Onumonu (yellow card) 90+8'	Box; Report	Rodriguez 10'; McCaskill (yellow card) 45+1'	Stadium: Cheney Stadium; Attendance: 3,036; Referee: Natalie Simon

May 27, 2019 6	Reign FC	2–1	North Carolina Courage	Tacoma, Washington
14:00	Balcer 13'; Theresa (yellow card) 30'; Groom 86'	Box; Report	Erceg 89'	Stadium: Cheney Stadium; Attendance: 3,032; Referee: Danielle Cheskey

June 2, 2019 7	Reign FC	1–1	Houston Dash	Tacoma, Washington
13:00	Balcer 32'; Groom (yellow card) 45+3'	Box; Report	Prisock (yellow card) 66'; Nairn 90'	Stadium: Cheney Stadium; Attendance: 3,063; Referee: Tori Penso

June 15, 2019 8	Reign FC	1–1	Washington Spirit	Tacoma, Washington
19:00	Fishlock 77'	Box	Huster (yellow card) 55'; Sullivan 62'	Stadium: Cheney Stadium; Attendance: 3,572; Referee: Natalie Simon

June 23, 2019 9	Chicago Red Stars	0–1	Reign FC	Bridgeview, Illinois
15:00	Stanton (yellow card) 29'	Box	Fishlock 80'; Barnes (yellow card) 90+3'	Stadium: SeatGeek Stadium; Attendance: 2,023; Referee: Ismir Pekmic

June 28, 2019 10	Utah Royals FC	0–2	Reign FC	Sandy, Utah
19:00	Stengel (yellow card) 84'	Box; Report	Fishlock 30'; Onumonu 35'; Groom (yellow card) 49'	Stadium: Rio Tinto Stadium; Attendance: 6,910; Referee: Kevin Broadley

July 5, 2019 11	Portland Thorns FC	0–1	Reign FC	Portland, Oregon
20:00	Dagný (yellow card) 54'	Box; Report	Barnes (yellow card) 22'; Groom (yellow card) 52'; Celia 55' (yellow card) 64'	Stadium: Providence Park; Attendance: 19,116; Referee: Farhad Dadkho

July 13, 2019 12	North Carolina Courage	2–0	Reign FC	Cary, North Carolina
16:00	Williams 22'; Debinha 55'; O'Sullivan (yellow card) 70'	Box; Report	Balcer (yellow card) 87'	Stadium: WakeMed Soccer Park; Attendance: 6,216; Referee: Tori Penso

July 28, 2019 13	Reign FC	0–4	Chicago Red Stars	Tacoma, Washington
13:00	Barnes (yellow card) 34'	Box; Report	Wright 4'; DiBernardo 14'; Nagasato 51'; Ertz (yellow card) 59'; Kerr 81'	Stadium: Cheney Stadium; Attendance: 7,479; Referee: Tim Ford

August 2, 2019 14	Houston Dash	0–1	Reign FC	Houston, Texas
16:00	Nairn (yellow card) 90+5'	Box; Report	White 21'; Jenkins (yellow card) 80'; Murphy (yellow card) 85'	Stadium: BBVA Stadium; Attendance: 3,621; Referee: Ismir Pekmic

August 7, 2019 15	Reign FC	1–0	Portland Thorns FC	Tacoma, Washington
19:00	Catley (yellow card) 31'; White 55'; Taylor (yellow card) 78'	Box; Report		Stadium: Cheney Stadium; Attendance: 5,865; Referee: Danielle Chesky

August 11, 2019 16	Reign FC	1–3	Utah Royals FC	Tacoma, Washington
13:00	Long (yellow card) 14'; Groom 41'; Celia (yellow card) 68'	Box; Report	Stengel 3'; LaBonta 59'; Rodriguez 67'; Weber (yellow card) 81'	Stadium: Cheney Stadium; Attendance: 5,939; Referee: Karen Abt

August 18, 2019 17	Sky Blue FC	1–1	Reign FC	Harrison, New Jersey
10:00	Eddy 36'	Box; Report	Taylor 38'; Long (yellow card) 84'	Stadium: Red Bull Arena; Attendance: 9,415; Referee: Luis Guardia

August 24, 2019 18	North Carolina Courage	1–0	Reign FC	Cary, North Carolina
16:00	L. Williams 82'	Box; Report		Stadium: Sahlen's Stadium at WakeMed Soccer Park; Attendance: 6,743; Referee: Greg Dopka

September 7, 2019 19	Reign FC	3–1	Orlando Pride	Tacoma, Washington
19:00	Jenkins 3', 12'; Yanez 17'; Barnes (yellow card) 61'	Box; Report	Camila 79' (pen.)	Stadium: Cheney Stadium; Attendance: 6,668; Referee: Karen ABT

September 14, 2019 20	Washington Spirit	2–2	Reign FC	Washington, D.C.
16:30	Hatch 30'; Logarzo 90'	Box; Report	Balcer 35'; Onumonu 90+2'; McNabb (yellow card) 90+7'	Stadium: Audi Field; Attendance: 17,418; Referee: Jon Freemon

September 21, 2019 21	Reign FC	0–1	Sky Blue FC	Tacoma, Washington
19:00		Box; Report	Dorsey (yellow card) 43'; Lloyd (yellow card) 50' (goal) 77'	Stadium: Cheney Stadium; Attendance: 6,189; Referee: Rosendo Mendoza

September 25, 2019 22	Reign FC	2–1	Utah Royals FC	Tacoma, Washington
19:00	Balcer 40'; McNabb (yellow card) 77'; Taylor 86'	Box; Report	Stengel 67'	Stadium: Cheney Stadium; Attendance: 5,015; Referee: Lukasz Szpala

September 29, 2019 23	Reign FC	2–0	Portland Thorns FC	Tacoma, Washington
11:00	Taylor 27'; Nielsen (yellow card) 36'; Yanez (yellow card) 51'; Balcer 81'	Box; Report	Foord (yellow card) 34'; Dagný (yellow card) 57'; Sonnett (yellow card) 89'	Stadium: Cheney Stadium; Attendance: 7,370; Referee: Matthew Franz

October 12, 2019 24	Orlando Pride	2–2	Reign FC	Orlando, Florida
16:30	Hill 24'; Marta (yellow card) 39' (goal) 86'; Elinsky (yellow card) 90+2'	Box; Report	Long (yellow card) 29'; Jenkins 34'; Taylor 41'; McNabb (yellow card) 59'; Celia (yellow card) 89'	Stadium: Orlando City Stadium; Attendance: 8,103; Referee: Kevin Broadley

==== Regular-season standings ====
Pos	Team	Pld	W	D	L	GF	GA	GD	Pts	Qualification
1	North Carolina Courage (C)	24	15	4	5	54	23	+31	49	NWSL Shield
2	Chicago Red Stars	24	14	2	8	41	28	+13	44	NWSL Playoffs
3	Portland Thorns FC	24	11	7	6	40	31	+9	40	NWSL Playoffs
4	Reign FC	24	10	8	6	27	27	0	38	NWSL Playoffs
5	Washington Spirit	24	9	7	8	30	25	+5	34	
6	Utah Royals FC	24	10	4	10	25	25	0	34	
7	Houston Dash	24	7	5	12	21	36	−15	26	
8	Sky Blue FC	24	5	5	14	20	34	−14	20	
9	Orlando Pride	24	4	4	16	24	53	−29	16	

Source: NWSL
Rules for classification: Tiebreakers
(C) Champions

===== Results summary =====
Overall								Home						Away					
Pld	W	D	L	GF	GA	GD	Pts	W	D	L	GF	GA	GD	W	D	L	GF	GA	GD
24	10	8	6	27	27	0	38	6	3	3	16	15	+1	4	5	3	11	12	−1

Last updated: October 13, 2019.
Source: NWSLsoccer.com

===== Results by matchday =====
Matchday	1	2	3	4	5	6	7	8	9	10	11	12	13	14	15	16	17	18	19	20	21	22	23	24
Stadium	A	H	A	A	H	H	H	H	A	A	A	A	H	A	H	H	A	A	H	A	H	H	H	A
Result	D	D	L	D	W	W	D	D	W	W	W	L	L	W	W	L	D	L	W	D	L	W	W	D
Position (Note: RFC's position at the end of the day on which their match was played.)	3	7	7	7	7	6	7	7	4	2	1	2	5	4	4	4	5	5	4	5	5	4	4	4

Updated to match(es) played on October 13, 2019. Source: NWSLsoccer.com
A = Away; H = Home; W = Win; D = Draw; L = Loss

=== Playoffs ===
October 20, 2019 Semi-final	North Carolina Courage	4–1 (a.e.t.)	Reign FC	Cary, North Carolina
10:30	O'Reilly 88' (pen.); Debinha 99'; Barnes 105+1' (o.g.); Dunn 107'	Box; Report	Long (yellow card) 50'; Onumonu 90+3'	Stadium: Sahlen’s Stadium at WakeMed Soccer Park; Attendance: 7,422; Referee: Tori Penso

== Appearances and goals ==
As of October 20, 2019; only players who have made appearances are listed.

No.	Pos	Nat	Player	Total		Regular season		Playoffs	
No.	Pos	Nat	Player	Apps	Goals	Apps	Goals	Apps	Goals
Goalkeepers:
1	GK	(Australia) AUS	Lydia Williams	1	0	1	0	0	0
18	GK	(United States) USA	Michelle Betos	4	0	4	0	0	0
26	GK	(United States) USA	Casey Murphy	20	0	19	0	1	0
Defenders:
3	DF	(United States) USA	Lauren Barnes	24	0	23	0	1	0
4	DF	(United States) USA	Megan Oyster	20	0	20	0	0	0
7	DF	(Australia) AUS	Steph Catley	16	0	15	0	1	0
8	DF	(Denmark) DEN	Theresa Nielsen	22	0	19+2	0	0+1	0
13	DF	(Spain) ESP	Celia Jiménez	13	1	10+2	1	0+1	0
19	DF	(United States) USA	Kristen McNabb	16	0	10+5	0	1	0
21	DF	(United States) USA	Christen Westphal	4	0	1+3	0	0	0
33	DF	(United States) USA	Stephanie Cox	8	0	3+4	0	1	0
Midfielders:
5	MF	(Canada) CAN	Quinn	6	0	4+2	0	0	0
6	MF	(United States) USA	Allie Long	15	0	14	0	1	0
10	MF	(Wales) WAL	Jess Fishlock	5	3	5	3	0	0
12	MF	(United States) USA	Morgan Andrews	9	0	7+2	0	0	0
14	MF	(United States) USA	Morgan Proffitt	6	0	4+2	0	0	0
17	MF	(United States) USA	Bev Yanez	22	1	20+1	1	1	0
20	MF	(Japan) JPN	Rumi Utsugi	5	0	4+1	0	0	0
31	MF	(New Zealand) NZL	Rosie White	9	2	8+1	2	0	0
Forwards:
2	FW	(United States) USA	Shea Groom	16	2	14+1	2	0+1	0
9	FW	(England) ENG	Jodie Taylor	17	5	15+1	5	1	0
11	FW	(United States) USA	Darian Jenkins	18	4	11+6	4	1	0
15	FW	(United States) USA	Megan Rapinoe	6	0	3+2	0	1	0
16	FW	(United States) USA	Jaycie Johnson	1	0	0+1	0	0	0
22	FW	(United States) USA	Jasmyne Spencer	1	0	1	0	0	0
24	FW	(United States) USA	Bethany Balcer	25	6	19+5	6	1	0
25	FW	(Nigeria) NGR	Ifeoma Onumonu	21	3	8+12	2	0+1	1
27	FW	(United States) USA	Addison Steiner	5	0	0+5	0	0	0
Players who left the club during the season:
5	FW	(United States) USA	Kiersten Dallstream	2	0	0+2	0	0	0
44	FW	(Canada) CAN	Maegan Kelly	6	0	2+4	0	0	0
88	MF	(Australia) AUS	Elise Kellond-Knight	3	0	0+3	0	0	0
Own goals for:
			Sky Blue FC (James)	1	1	1	1	0	0

== Transfers ==
For transfers in, dates listed are when Reign FC officially signed the players to the roster. Transactions where only the rights to the players are acquired (e.g., draft picks) are not listed. For transfers out, dates listed are when Reign FC officially removed the players from its roster, not when they signed with another club. If a player later signed with another club, her new club will be noted, but the date listed here remains the one when she was officially removed from the Reign FC roster.

=== Transfers in ===
Date	Player	Pos	Signed From	Notes	Ref
September 24, 2018	(Australia) Elise Kellond-Knight	MF	(Sweden) Hammarby	Free transfer from Melbourne City after the conclusion of 2018–19 W-League season	
October 11, 2018	(Australia) Steph Catley	DF	(Australia) Melbourne City	Free transfer after the conclusion of 2018–19 W-League season	
December 12, 2018	(Spain) Celia Jiménez Delgado	DF	(Sweden) FC Rosengård	Free	
December 17, 2018	(United States) Darian Jenkins	FW	(United States) North Carolina Courage	Traded in exchange for the No. 9 overall pick in 2019	
January 15, 2019	(United States) Shea Groom	FW	(United States) Sky Blue FC	Traded in exchange for Nahomi Kawasumi	
February 27, 2019	(United States) Morgan Proffitt	MF	(Czech Republic) SK Slavia Praha	Free	
March 22, 2019	(United States) Taylor Smith	DF	(United States) Washington Spirit	Free	
April 13, 2019	(United States) Bethany Balcer	FW	(United States) Spring Arbor Cougars	Free	
May 3, 2019	(Canada) Maegan Kelly	FW	(Italy) Atalanta Mozzanica	National Team Replacement player	
May 14, 2019	(Nigeria) Ifeoma Onumonu	FW	(United States) Portland Thorns	National Team Replacement player; promoted to supplemental roster on June 28, 2019	
May 15, 2019	(United States) Casey Murphy	GK	(France) Montpellier HSC	Undisclosed	
May 22, 2019	(United States) Scout Watson	GK	(United States) Colorado Buffaloes	National Team Replacement player	
May 31, 2019	(United States) Stephanie Cox	DF	Retirement	National Team Replacement player; promoted to senior roster on July 16, 2019	
June 14, 2019	(United States) Erin Yenney	MF	(United States) Chicago Red Stars	National Team Replacement player	
June 14, 2019	(United States) Kori Butterfield	GK	(Iceland) Thróttur Reykjavík	Goalkeeper replacement for Scout Watson	
July 15, 2019	(United States) Sammy Jo Prudhomme	GK	(United States) Washington Spirit	Traded in exchange for Elise Kellond-Knight	
July 15, 2019	(Canada) Quinn	MF	(France) Paris FC	Free	
July 15, 2019	(United States) Schuyler DeBree	DF	(Czech Republic) AC Sparta Praha	Undisclosed	
July 16, 2019	(United States) Addison Steiner	FW	(Sweden) KIF Örebro	Promoted to supplemental roster; originally signed on loan as National Team Replacement player on May 23, 2019	
July 16, 2019	(New Zealand) Rosie White	MF	Unattached	Free	

=== Loans in ===
Start	End	Player	Pos	Parent Club	Notes	Ref
May 23, 2019	July 15, 2019	(United States) Addison Steiner	FW	(Sweden) KIF Örebro	National Team Replacement player	

=== Transfers out ===
Date	Player	Pos	Destination Club	Notes	Ref
January 3, 2019	(Canada) Adriana Leon	FW	(England) West Ham United	Rights relinquished	
January 15, 2019	(Japan) Nahomi Kawasumi	FW	(United States) Sky Blue FC	Traded in exchange for Shea Groom	
February 5, 2019	(Ghana) Elizabeth Addo	FW	(China) Jiangsu Suning	Waived	
February 27, 2019	(United States) Alyssa Kleiner	DF		Retired	
March 1, 2019	(United States) Yael Averbuch	DF		Playing career suspended due to illness	
July 3, 2019	(United States) Kori Butterfield	GK		Released	
July 15, 2019	(United States) Erin Yenney	MF	(Finland) Åland United	Released	
July 15, 2019	(Canada) Maegan Kelly	FW	(Italy) Florentia	Released	
July 15, 2019	(Australia) Elise Kellond-Knight	MF	(United States) Washington Spirit	Traded in exchange for Sammy Jo Prudhomme	
July 26, 2019	(United States) Kiersten Dallstream	FW		Retired	

=== Loans out ===
Start	End	Player	Pos	Destination Club	Notes	Ref
September 24, 2018	May 24, 2019	(Wales) Jess Fishlock	MF	(France) Lyon		
October 11, 2018	February 1, 2019	(United States) Lauren Barnes	DF	(Australia) Melbourne City		
October 11, 2018	February 1, 2019	(Denmark) Theresa Nielsen	DF	(Australia) Melbourne City		
October 11, 2018	February 1, 2019	(Australia) Lydia Williams	GK	(Australia) Melbourne City		
October 11, 2018	February 1, 2019	(United States) Jasmyne Spencer	FW	(Australia) Melbourne City		
October 11, 2018	February 3, 2019	(Ghana) Elizabeth Addo	MF	(Australia) Western Sydney Wanderers		
November 15, 2018	January 8, 2019	(England) Jodie Taylor	FW	(Australia) Melbourne City	Guest-player loan	

=== New contracts ===
Date	Player	Pos	Notes	Ref
October 1, 2018	(Australia) Lydia Williams	GK	Club options exercised	
October 1, 2018	(United States) Michelle Betos	GK	Club options exercised	
October 1, 2018	(United States) Lauren Barnes	DF	Club options exercised	
October 1, 2018	(Denmark) Theresa Nielsen	DF	Club options exercised	
October 1, 2018	(United States) Christen Westphal	DF	Club options exercised	
October 1, 2018	(United States) Alyssa Kleiner	DF	Club options exercised	
October 1, 2018	(Australia) Steph Catley	DF	Club options exercised	
October 1, 2018	(Wales) Jess Fishlock	MF	Club options exercised	
October 1, 2018	(Ghana) Elizabeth Addo	MF	Club options exercised	
October 1, 2018	(Japan) Rumi Utsugi	MF	Club options exercised	
October 1, 2018	(Japan) Nahomi Kawasumi	FW	Club options exercised	
October 1, 2018	(England) Jodie Taylor	FW	Club options exercised	
October 1, 2018	(United States) Jaycie Johnson	FW	Club options exercised	
December 13, 2018	(United States) Jasmyne Spencer	FW	Re-signed	
December 14, 2018	(United States) Morgan Andrews	MF	Re-signed	
December 18, 2018	(United States) Kristen McNabb	DF	Re-signed	
January 15, 2019	(United States) Bev Yanez	MF	Re-signed	
January 17, 2019	(United States) Megan Oyster	DF	Re-signed	
April 21, 2019	(United States) Kiersten Dallstream	FW	Re-signed	

== Awards ==
=== The Best FIFA Football Awards ===
- The Best FIFA Women's Player: Megan Rapinoe
- FIFA FIFPro Women's World11: Megan Rapinoe

=== 2019 Ballon d'Or ===
- Ballon d'Or Féminin: Megan Rapinoe

=== SI Sportsperson of the Year ===
- 2019 Sports Illustrated Sportsperson of the Year: Megan Rapinoe

=== The Guardian Footballer of the Year ===
- 2019 The Guardian Footballer of the Year: Megan Rapinoe

=== The Guardian 100 Best Footballers in The World ===
- No. 3: Megan Rapinoe

=== NWSL Players' Awards ===
- Players' Rookie of the Year: Bethany Balcer

=== NWSL season awards ===
- Coach of the Year: Vlatko Andonovski
- Second XI: Bethany Balcer, Lauren Barnes, Megan Rapinoe
- Rookie of the Year: Bethany Balcer
- Defender of the Year: Lauren Barnes (finalist)
- Goalkeeper of the Year: Casey Murphy (finalist)

=== Club season awards ===
Announced on October 25, 2019.

- Most Valuable Player: Bev Yanez
- Defender of the Year: Lauren Barnes
- Newcomer of the Year: Bethany Balcer
- Golden Boot: Bethany Balcer (6)

=== NWSL Player of the Month ===
Month	Player	Ref.
June	(Wales) Jess Fishlock	

=== NWSL Team of the Month ===
Month	Goalkeeper	Defenders	Midfielders	Forwards	Ref
June		(United States) Megan Oyster	(Wales) Jess Fishlock	(Nigeria) Ifeoma Onumonu	
September		(United States) Lauren Barnes	(United States) Bev Yanez		

=== NWSL Player of the Week ===
Week	Player	Ref.
9	(Wales) Jess Fishlock	
10	(Nigeria) Ifeoma Onumonu	
21	(United States) Darian Jenkins	
24	(England) Jodie Taylor	

=== NWSL Goal of the Week ===
Week	Result	Player	Ref.
2	Nominated	(United States) Bethany Balcer	
7	Won	(United States) Bethany Balcer	
10	Won	(Wales) Jess Fishlock	
11	Nominated	(Wales) Jess Fishlock	
12	Nominated	(Spain) Celia	
16	Nominated	(New Zealand) Rosie White	
17	Nominated	(United States) Shea Groom	
21	Nominated	(United States) Darian Jenkins	
24	Nominated	(United States) Bethany Balcer	
25	Nominated	(United States) Darian Jenkins	

=== NWSL Save of the Week ===
Week	Result	Player	Ref.	Note
1	Nominated	(United States) Michelle Betos		
2	Nominated	(United States) Michelle Betos		
3	Nominated	(Australia) Lydia Williams		
6	Won Honorary	(United States) Morgan Andrews		Andrews filled in at goalkeeper to claim an honorary NWSL Save of the Week award.
6	Nominated	(United States) Michelle Betos		
9	Nominated	(United States) Casey Murphy		
10	Nominated	(United States) Casey Murphy		
11	Nominated	(United States) Casey Murphy		
12	Nominated	(United States) Casey Murphy		
13	Nominated	(United States) Casey Murphy		
15	Nominated	(United States) Casey Murphy		
17	Nominated	(United States) Casey Murphy		
18	Nominated	(United States) Casey Murphy		
19	Nominated	(United States) Casey Murphy		
22	Nominated	(United States) Casey Murphy		
25	Won	(United States) Casey Murphy		
