= 2019 North Carolina Courage season =

North Carolina Courage
2019 season
- Owner: Stephen Malik
- General Manager: Curt Johnson
- Head Coach: Paul Riley
- Stadium: Sahlen's Stadium at WakeMed Soccer Park; Cary, North Carolina (Capacity: 10,000)
- NWSL Regular Season: 1st
- NWSL Playoffs: Champions
- Top goalscorer: Lynn Williams (12)
- Highest home attendance: 9,563 (September 14th vs. Orlando)
- Lowest home attendance: 4,053 (April 13th vs. Chicago)
- Average home league attendance: 5,875
- Biggest win: 6–0 (September 11th vs. Portland)
- Biggest defeat: 1–3 (May 11th vs. Chicago)
Home colors	Away colors

The 2019 North Carolina Courage season was the team's third season as a professional women's soccer team. North Carolina Courage plays in the National Women's Soccer League, the top tier of women's soccer in the United States.

On September 21, the Courage clinched their third consecutive Shield with a 3–0 victory over the Utah Royals.

On October 27, the Courage defeated the Chicago Red Stars 4–0 to win their second consecutive NWSL Championship.

== Team ==
=== Coaching staff ===
As of May 31, 2018
Source: North Carolina Courage

Position	Staff
Head coach	(England) Paul Riley
Assistant coach	(United States) Scott Vallow
Assistant coach	(United States) Bill Paladino
Assistant coach	(United States) Sean Nahas
Assistant coach	(England) Nathan Thackeray

=== First-team roster ===
As of July 18, 2019

Note: Flags indicate national team as defined under FIFA eligibility rules; some limited exceptions apply. Players may hold more than one non-FIFA nationality.

No.	Pos.	Nation	Player
1	GK	CAN	Stephanie Labbé
3	DF	USA	Kaleigh Kurtz
4	FW	USA	McKenzie Meehan
5	MF	USA	Sam Mewis
6	DF	NZL	Abby Erceg
7	MF	USA	McCall Zerboni
8	MF	IRL	Denise O'Sullivan
9	FW	USA	Lynn Williams
10	MF	BRA	Debinha
11	DF	USA	Merritt Mathias
12	FW	USA	Leah Pruitt
13	DF	USA	Abby Dahlkemper
14	FW	USA	Jessica McDonald

No.	Pos.	Nation	Player
15	DF	USA	Jaelene Hinkle
16	MF	SWE	Julia Spetsmark
17	MF	USA	Heather O'Reilly
19	FW	USA	Crystal Dunn
20	MF	USA	Ryan Williams
21	DF	USA	Cari Roccaro
23	FW	USA	Kristen Hamilton
25	DF	USA	Meredith Speck
26	DF	USA	Hailey Harbison
27	MF	USA	Lauren Milliet
37	GK	USA	Sam Leshnak
99	GK	USA	Katelyn Rowland

== Player transactions ==
=== 2019 NWSL College Draft ===
Source: National Women's Soccer League

Round	Pick	Nat.	Player	Previous Team
Round 1	5	(United States)	Leah Pruitt	USC
Round 1	9	(United States)	Hailey Harbison	Pepperdine
Round 2	14	(United States)	Lauren Milliet	Colorado College
Round 4	36	(United States)	Kaycie Tillman	Florida State

=== Players in ===
Date	Player	Positions played	Previous club	Fee/notes	Ref.
January 7, 2019	(Sweden) Julia Spetsmark	DF	(Sweden) Djurgården	Signed.	
February 12, 2019	(United States) Ally Haran	DF	(Iceland) UMF Selfoss	Signed.	
February 22, 2019	(Canada) Stephanie Labbé	GK	(Sweden) Linköpings FC	Signed.	
June 11, 2019	(United States) McKenzie Meehan	FW	Sky Blue FC	Acquired in a Trade with Sky Blue FC in exchange for Elizabeth Eddy	
July 18, 2019	(United States) Sam Leshnak	GK	North Carolina Tar Heels	Signed.	

=== Players out ===
Date	Player	Positions played	Destination club	Fee/notes	Ref.
October 1, 2018	(Japan) Yuri Kawamura	DF	unattached	Waived.	
December 17, 2018	(United States) Darian Jenkins	FW	Reign FC	Traded to Reign FC in exchange for Reign FC's 9th overall pick in the 2019 NWSL College Draft.	
January 4, 2019	(Canada) Sabrina D'Angelo	GK	(Sweden) Vittsjö	Signed with Vittsjö.	
April 4, 2019	(United States) Morgan Reid	DF	Orlando Pride	Traded to the Orlando Pride in exchange for Orlando's fourth round pick in the 2020 NWSL College Draft.	
June 11, 2019	(United States) Elizabeth Eddy	MF	Sky Blue FC	Traded to Sky Blue FC in exchange for McKenzie Meehan.	
July 18, 2019	(United States) Julie King	DF		Waived.	
July 18, 2019	(United States) Ally Haran	DF		Waived.	

== Competitions ==
=== National Women's Soccer League ===
==== Preseason ====
Source: North Carolina Courage

March 23	North Carolina Courage	4–0	Orlando Pride	Cary, North Carolina
1:00 p.m. ET	Speck 35'; McDonald 61' (Williams); Williams 69' (Pruitt); Spetsmark 89' (Eddy)	Report	Morgan (yellow card) 45+1'	Stadium: Sahlen's Stadium at WakeMed Soccer Park; Attendance: 4,220

==== Regular season ====
Source: North Carolina Courage

April 13 1	North Carolina Courage	1–1	Chicago Red Stars	Cary, North Carolina
7:00 p.m. EDT	Dunn 66'	Report	Kerr 26'	Stadium: Sahlen's Stadium at WakeMed Soccer Park; Attendance: 4,053

April 17 2	North Carolina Courage	5–0	Orlando Pride	Cary, North Carolina
7:00 p.m. EDT	Williams 45'; O'Sullivan (yellow card) 45+1'; McDonald 55'; Zerboni (yellow card) 64'; Dunn 70', 77'; Spetsmark 88'	Report	Marta (yellow card) 85'	Stadium: Sahlen's Stadium at WakeMed Soccer Park; Attendance: 4,292; Referee: Danielle Chesky

April 28 3	Houston Dash	1–4	North Carolina Courage	Houston, Texas
5:00 p.m. CDT	Daly 86'; Schmidt (yellow card) 44'	Report	Williams 45+1'; Dunn 69'; Debinha 69'; Pruitt 76'	Stadium: BBVA Compass Stadium; Attendance: 2,933

May 04 4	North Carolina Courage	0–0	Sky Blue FC	Cary, North Carolina
7:00 p.m. EDT	Zerboni (yellow card) 87'	Report	Monaghan (yellow card) 34'	Stadium: Sahlen's Stadium at WakeMed Soccer Park; Attendance: 5,039

May 11 5	Chicago Red Stars	3–1	North Carolina Courage	Bridgeview, Illinois
5:00 p.m. EDT	Kerr 13' 90+3'; Vasconcelos 40'; Stanton (yellow card) 72'	Report	Williams 33', (yellow card) 80'	Stadium: SeatGeek Stadium; Attendance: 2,113

May 19 6	North Carolina Courage	1–1	Utah Royals FC	Cary, North Carolina
5:00 p.m. EDT	Eddy 78'	Box	Rodriguez 7', (yellow card) 40'	Stadium: Sahlen's Stadium at WakeMed Soccer Park; Attendance: 4,821

May 27 7	Reign FC	2–1	North Carolina Courage	Tacoma, Washington
4:00 p.m. PDT	Balcer 13' Nielsen (yellow card) 30' Groom 89'	Box	Erceg 89'	Stadium: Cheney Stadium; Attendance: 3,032

June 01 8	Orlando Pride	0–3	North Carolina Courage	Orlando, Florida
7:30 p.m. EDT	Ubogagu (yellow card) 56'	Box	Hamilton 59', 66', 85' Denise O'Sullivan (yellow card) 53'	Stadium: Orlando City Stadium; Attendance: 4,427

June 15 9	North Carolina Courage	1–1	Portland Thorns FC	Cary, North Carolina
7:45 p.m. EDT	Kurtz (yellow card) 19'; Spetsmark 59'	Box	Purce 26'; Lussi (yellow card) 63'	Stadium: Sahlen's Stadium at WakeMed Soccer Park; Attendance: 6,172
Note: doubleheader with North Carolina FC.

June 29 10	Washington Spirit	1–2	North Carolina Courage	Germantown, Maryland
7:00 p.m. EDT	Harrison (yellow card) 39'; Thomas 82'		Debinha 45+4'; Pritchett 53'; Zerboni (yellow card) 90+3'	Stadium: Maryland SoccerPlex; Attendance: 3,481

July 05 11	North Carolina Courage	5–2	Houston Dash	Cary, North Carolina
7:00 p.m. EDT	Hamilton 5' 18' 54' 71'; Williams 31'	Box	Mewis 24'; Simon 43'; Schmidt (yellow card) 53'; Hanson (yellow card) 69'	Stadium: Sahlen's Stadium at WakeMed Soccer Park; Attendance: 5,066

July 13 12	North Carolina Courage	2–0	Reign FC	Cary, North Carolina
7:00 p.m. EDT	Williams 22'; Debinha 55'; O'Sullivan (yellow card) 70'	Box; Report	Balcer (yellow card) 87'	Stadium: WakeMed Soccer Park; Attendance: 6,216

July 21 13	Chicago Red Stars	2–1	North Carolina Courage	Bridgeview, Illinois
5:00 p.m. CDT	Naughton (yellow card) 14'; DiBernardo 37'; Kerr 58'		Williams 30'; McDonald (yellow card) 51'	Stadium: SeatGeek Stadium; Attendance: 17,388
Note: Game was broadcast on ESPN 2

July 27 14	Utah Royals FC	1–2	North Carolina Courage	Sandy, Utah
8:00 p.m. MDT	Press 13'		Hamilton 34'; McDonald 54'	Stadium: Rio Tinto Stadium; Attendance: 10,545

August 03 15	North Carolina Courage	1–0	Washington Spirit	Cary, North Carolina
4:00 p.m. EDT	Debinha 64'; Spetsmark (yellow card) 90+4'		Nielsen (red card) 24'	Stadium: Sahlen's Stadium at WakeMed Soccer Park; Attendance: 4,393
Note: Rescheduled from August 2 due to thunderstorms.

August 11 16	Portland Thorns FC	2–1	North Carolina Courage	Portland, Oregon
12:00 p.m. PDT	Foord (yellow card) 19'; Labbé 56' (o.g.); Erceg 82' (o.g.)		Dunn 4'	Stadium: Providence Park; Attendance: 25,218
Note: Game was broadcast on ESPNews

August 24 17	North Carolina Courage	1–0	Reign FC	Cary, North Carolina
7:00 p.m. EDT	L. Williams 82'			Stadium: Sahlen's Stadium at WakeMed Soccer Park; Attendance: 6,743

September 07 18	Sky Blue FC	1–2	North Carolina Courage	Piscataway, New Jersey
3:00 p.m. EDT	Lloyd 13' (pen.); Rodriguez (yellow card) 79'		Skroski 1' (o.g.); Dunn 57'	Stadium: Yurcak Field; Attendance: 2,895

September 11 19	Portland Thorns FC	0–6	North Carolina Courage	Portland, Oregon
7:30 p.m. PDT	Klingenberg (yellow card) 57'; Horan (yellow card) 58'		Debinha 15'; L. Williams 21', 24', 68'; Dunn 61'; Hinkle (yellow card) 69'; Hamilton 89'	Stadium: Providence Park; Attendance: 17,517

September 14 20	North Carolina Courage	6–1	Orlando Pride	Cary, North Carolina
6:00 p.m. EDT	Williams 6'; Edmonds 37' (o.g.); McDonald 41'; Meehan 78'; O'Reilly 85'; Debinha 90+2'		Greening (yellow card) 11'; Kennedy (yellow card) 28'; Elinsky (yellow card) 28'; Hill 82'	Stadium: WakeMed Soccer Park; Attendance: 9,563

September 17 21	North Carolina Courage	1–0	Houston Dash	Cary, North Carolina
7:30 p.m. EDT	Mewis 87' (pen.)	Report	Daly (yellow card) 73'; Brooks (yellow card) 74'; Mewis (yellow card) 86'	Stadium: Sahlen's Stadium at WakeMed Soccer Park; Attendance: 4,943

September 21 22	Utah Royals FC	0–3	North Carolina Courage	Sandy, Utah
7:00 p.m. MDT			Mewis 30' (pen.); O'Sullivan (yellow card) 35'; Hinkle 65'; Debinha 70'	Stadium: Rio Tinto Stadium; Attendance: 9,946

September 28 23	Washington Spirit	2–1	North Carolina Courage	Germantown, Maryland
7:00 p.m. EDT	Huster (yellow card) 56'; Matthews (yellow card) 59'; Pugh 75'; Lavelle 84'		Williams 45+2'; Erceg (yellow card) 86'	Stadium: Maryland SoccerPlex

October 12 24	North Carolina Courage	3–2	Sky Blue FC	Cary, North Carolina
7:00 p.m. EDT	McDonald 16'; Debinha 28'; McDonald 81'	Report	Lloyd 26'; Richardson 86'	Stadium: Sahlen's Stadium at WakeMed Soccer Park; Attendance: 9,195

==== Postseason playoffs ====
October 20 Semifinal	North Carolina Courage	4–1	Reign FC	Cary, North Carolina
1:30 p.m. EDT	O'Reilly 88'; Debinha 99'; Barnes 106' (o.g.); Dunn 107'	Report	Long (yellow card) 50'; Onumonu 90+3'	Stadium: Sahlen's Stadium at WakeMed Soccer Park
Note: Televised on ESPN2

October 27 Final	North Carolina Courage	4–0	Chicago Red Stars	Cary, North Carolina
3:30 p.m. EST	Debinha 4'; McDonald 26'; Dunn 45+5'; Mewis 62'; Zerboni (yellow card) 74'	Report	DiBernardo (yellow card) 47'; Ertz (yellow card) 67'	Stadium: Sahlen's Stadium at WakeMed Soccer Park; Attendance: 10,227
Note: Televised on ESPN

==== League table ====
Pos	Team	Pld	W	D	L	GF	GA	GD	Pts	Qualification
1	North Carolina Courage (C)	24	15	4	5	54	23	+31	49	NWSL Shield
2	Chicago Red Stars	24	14	2	8	41	28	+13	44	NWSL Playoffs
3	Portland Thorns FC	24	11	7	6	40	31	+9	40	NWSL Playoffs
4	Reign FC	24	10	8	6	27	27	0	38	NWSL Playoffs
5	Washington Spirit	24	9	7	8	30	25	+5	34	
6	Utah Royals FC	24	10	4	10	25	25	0	34	
7	Houston Dash	24	7	5	12	21	36	−15	26	
8	Sky Blue FC	24	5	5	14	20	34	−14	20	
9	Orlando Pride	24	4	4	16	24	53	−29	16	

Source: NWSL
Rules for classification: Tiebreakers
(C) Champions

===== Results summary =====
Overall								Home						Away					
Pld	W	D	L	GF	GA	GD	Pts	W	D	L	GF	GA	GD	W	D	L	GF	GA	GD
24	15	4	5	54	23	+31	49	8	4	0	27	8	+19	7	0	5	27	15	+12

Last updated: October 12, 2019.
Source: NWSLsoccer.com

===== Results by round =====
Round	1	2	3	4	5	6	7	8	9	10	11	12	13	14	15	16	17	18	19	20	21	22	23	24
Ground	H	H	A	H	A	H	A	A	H	A	H	H	A	A	H	A	H	A	A	H	H	A	A	H
Result	D	W	W	D	L	D	L	W	D	W	W	W	L	W	W	L	W	W	W	W	W	W	L	W
Position	3	1	1	2	4	5	7	4	4	5	2	1	2	2	1	3	2	2	1	1	1	1	1	1

Updated to match(es) played on October 12, 2019. Source: NWSLsoccer.com
A = Away; H = Home; W = Win; D = Draw; L = Loss

=== International friendlies ===
As defending 2018 NWSL champions and defending 2018 Women's ICC champions, the Courage were selected to participate in and host the 2019 Women's International Champions Cup. They are scheduled to play English side Manchester City in the semi-final round.

August 15 Semi-final	North Carolina Courage (United States)	2–1	(England) Manchester City	Cary, North Carolina
7:30 p.m. ET	O'Sullivan (yellow card) 80'; Meehan 84'; McDonald 90+2'	Report	Stanway 41'	Stadium: Sahlen's Stadium at WakeMed Soccer Park; Attendance: 5,436

August 18 Final	North Carolina Courage (United States)	0–1	(France) Lyon	Cary, North Carolina
7:30 p.m. ET				Stadium: Sahlen's Stadium at WakeMed Soccer Park
Note: Broadcast on ESPN2

== Statistical leaders ==
As of October 12, 2019

=== Top scorers ===
Rank	Player	Goals
1	(United States) Lynn Williams	12
2	(United States) Kristen Hamilton	9
3	(Brazil) Debinha	8
4	(United States) Crystal Dunn	7
5	(United States) Jessica McDonald	5
6	(Sweden) Julia Spetsmark	2
6	(United States) Leah Pruitt	2
6	(United States) Sam Mewis	2
9	(United States) Elizabeth Eddy	1
9	(New Zealand) Abby Erceg	1
9	(United States) Heather O'Reilly	1
9	(United States) Jaelene Hinkle	1

=== Top assists ===
Rank	Player	Assists
1	(Brazil) Debinha	7
2	(United States) Jaelene Hinkle	6
3	(United States) Lynn Williams	5
3	(United States) Merritt Mathias	5
3	(United States) Kristen Hamilton	5
6	(United States) Crystal Dunn	4
7	(United States) Jessica McDonald	3
8	(United States) McCall Zerboni	1
8	(United States) Leah Pruitt	1
8	(United States) Denise O'Sullivan	1
8	(United States) Sam Mewis	1
8	(Sweden) Julia Spetsmark	1
8	(United States) Heather O'Reilly	1
8	(United States) Cari Roccaro	1

=== Shutouts ===
Rank	Player	Clean sheets
1	(Canada) Stephanie Labbé	8
2	(United States) Samantha Leshnak	1

== Awards ==
As of October 19, 2019.

=== NWSL annual awards ===
- Most Valuable Player: Debinha (finalist), Jaelene Hinkle (finalist), Kristen Hamilton (finalist)
- Coach of the Year: Paul Riley (finalist)

=== NWSL Monthly Awards ===
==== NWSL Player of the Month ====
Month	Result	Player	Ref.
April	Won	(United States) Crystal Dunn	
July	Won	(United States) Kristen Hamilton	

==== NWSL Team of the Month ====
Month	Goalkeeper	Defenders	Midfielders	Forwards	Ref
April		(New Zealand) Abby Erceg	(United States) Crystal Dunn		
May		(United States) Merritt Mathias			
June			(United States) Kristen Hamilton		
July		(New Zealand) Abby Erceg (United States) Merritt Mathias	(Brazil) Debinha	(United States) Kristen Hamilton	
August		(New Zealand) Abby Erceg (United States) Jaelene Hinkle	(Brazil) Debinha		
September		(United States) Jaelene Hinkle	(Brazil) Debinha	(United States) Lynn Williams	

=== NWSL Weekly Awards ===
==== NWSL Player of the Week ====
Week	Result	Player	Ref.
8	Won	(United States) Kristen Hamilton	
12	Won	(United States) Kristen Hamilton	
15	Won	(United States) Kristen Hamilton	
22	Won	(United States) Lynn Williams	
25	Won	(United States) Jessica McDonald	

==== NWSL Goal of the Week ====
Week	Result	Player	Ref.
1	Nominated	(United States) Crystal Dunn	
3	Nominated	(United States) Crystal Dunn	
6	Nominated	(United States) Elizabeth Eddy	
8	Nominated	(United States) Kristen Hamilton	
9	Nominated	(United States) Julia Spetsmark	
11	Nominated	(United States) Leah Pruitt	
12	Nominated	(United States) Kristen Hamilton	
13	Nominated	(Brazil) Debinha	
15	Nominated	(United States) Kristen Hamilton	
16	Nominated	(Brazil) Debinha	
17	Nominated	(United States) Crystal Dunn	
19	Nominated	(United States) Lynn Williams	
21	Nominated	(United States) Crystal Dunn	
22	Won	(United States) Heather O'Reilly	

==== NWSL Save of the Week ====
Week	Result	Player	Ref.
4	Nominated	(United States) Merritt Mathias	
7	Nominated	(United States) Merritt Mathias	
11	Nominated	(United States) Katelyn Rowland	
16	Nominated	(Canada) Stephanie Labbé	
17	Nominated	(Canada) Stephanie Labbé	
23	Nominated	(Canada) Stephanie Labbé	
