= Celia Jiménez (footballer) =

Spanish footballer (born 1995)

Celia
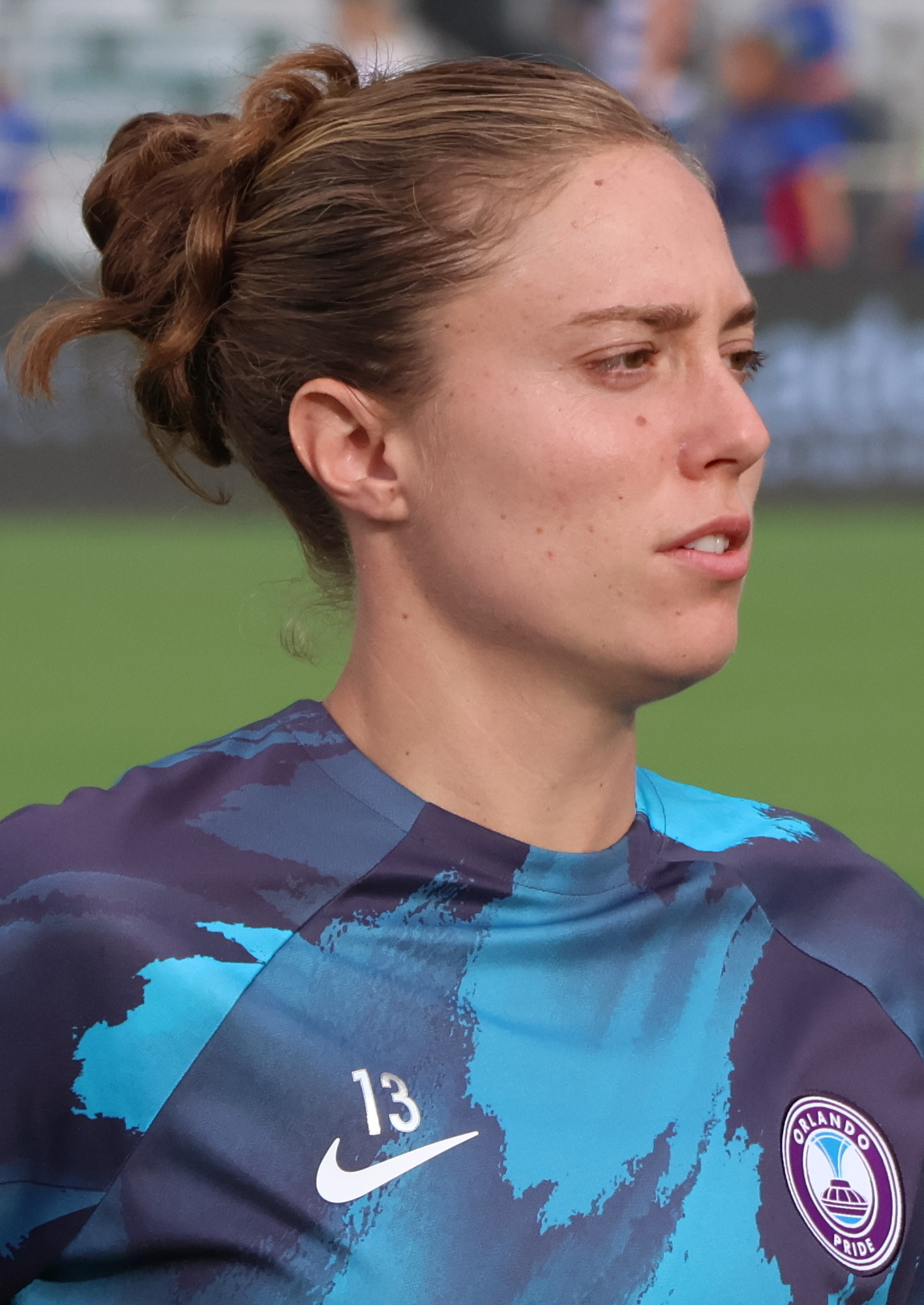
- Celia with the Orlando Pride in 2024

Personal information
- Full name: Celia Jiménez Delgado
- Date of birth: 20 June 1995 (age 31)
- Place of birth: Alcaudete, Andalusia, Spain
- Height: 1.77 m (5 ft 10 in)
- Position: Right wing-back

Youth career
- ADV Alcaudete
- Real Jaén

College career
| Years | Team | Apps | (Gls) |
| 2013–2014 | Iowa Western Reivers | 33 | (29) |
| 2015–2017 | Alabama Crimson Tide | 39 | (7) |

Senior career*
| Years | Team | Apps | (Gls) |
| 2009–2010 | Real Jaén | | |
| 2010–2013 | Sevilla | | |
| 2018 | Seattle Sounders | | |
| 2018 | FC Rosengård | 9 | (1) |
| 2019–2021 | OL Reign | 16 | (1) |
| 2019–2020 | → Perth Glory (loan) | 9 | (3) |
| 2020–2021 | → Lyon (loan) | 0 | (0) |
| 2022–2024 | Orlando Pride | 29 | (2) |

International career^{‡}
| 2010–2012 | Spain U17 | 12 | (0) |
| 2012–2014 | Spain U19 | 13 | (4) |
| 2014–2019 | Spain | 25 | (0) |
- * Club domestic league appearances and goals as of 7 November 2024 ‡ National team caps and goals as of 31 December 2022

Celia Jiménez Delgado (born 20 June 1995), often known mononymously as Celia, is a former Spanish professional footballer who plays as a right back. She made her senior national team debut on September 17, 2014. Celia represented Spain in two FIFA Women's World Cups in 2015 and 2019, the youngest Spanish player to represent the country in a World Cup. Celia won the 2024 NWSL Shield and NWSL Championship with the Pride and was a nominee for the Lauren Holiday Impact Award, honoring her contributions to the community promoting STEM education for young students. She holds a Bachelor of Science in Aerospace Engineering from the University of Alabama and a Master of Business Administration (MBA) from Washington State University and a cross over to Business from Harvard University.

== Early life ==
Born in Alcaudete, Andalusia, Celia grew up playing football at school during recess, leading her mother to encourage her to join hometown club ADV Alcaudete. At the age of 12, Celia was no longer allowed to play on boys' teams and left to join the girls' academy at Real Jaén. She debuted for the senior team of FCF Atlético Jiennense, Jaén's female affiliate, during the 2009–10 Superliga Femenina season, becoming the youngest Spanish first division player at the age of 14. Ahead of the 2010–11 Superliga Femenina season, Celia joined Sevilla but the team was relegated to the Segunda División at the end of the campaign before winning promotion back to the Primera División the following season. After three seasons, Celia left Sevilla.

=== College career ===
Celia grew up fascinated by engineering and watched her older sister, Laura, pursue a career in aerospace engineering. Celia wanted to follow in her sister's footsteps but did not want to give up playing football so, despite fielding offers from clubs in Spain, decided moved to the United States on a scholarship to play collegiately while studying aerospace engineering. She spent two years at Iowa Western Community College, helping the Reivers to win the NJCAA National Championship title as a freshman while being named to the NJCAA 2013 All-Tournament Team and as the Most Valuable Forward in the tournament. She earned first-team All-American honours at the junior college level in both seasons.

In 2015, Celia transferred to the University of Alabama to join NCAA Division I program Alabama Crimson Tide. In her first season with the team, Celia made 19 appearances and was selected to the All-SEC second-team. She suffered a season-ending knee injury in 2016 preseason and considered retiring but, having spent a redshirt year focusing on her studies, returned in 2017 to make 20 appearances and earned All-SEC first-team honours.

In 2023, Celia earned her Master of Business Administration (MBA) from Washington State University, complementing her technical background with advanced business and leadership skills. This academic achievement reinforced her ability to bridge the gap between engineering, innovation, and strategic management,

== Club career ==
=== Seattle Sounders ===
On 18 January 2018, Celia was selected in the fourth round (36th overall) of the 2018 NWSL College Draft by Seattle Reign. In doing so she became the first Spanish player and the first Alabama Crimson Tide player to be drafted into the NWSL. She did not initially sign with the team, instead opting to remain in college to finish her degree. After graduating in June 2018, Celia trained full-time with Reign FC while playing for Women's Premier Soccer League side Seattle Sounders during the remainder of the 2018 WPSL season, scoring the winning goal in the Championship final.

=== FC Rosengård ===
On 13 August 2018, Celia joined Swedish Damallsvenskan club FC Rosengård for the remainder of the 2018 Damallsvenskan season. She made her debut five days later, starting in a 10–0 win over IFK Kalmar. She made a total of 14 appearances in all competitions, scoring one goal in a 3–0 win over Kristianstads DFF on 23 September.

=== Reign FC ===
Ahead of the 2019 NWSL season, Celia returned to sign with Reign FC. In her first season with the team, Celia made 13 appearances including 10 starts and scored once, the only goal in a 1–0 win over derby rivals Portland Thorns FC.

During the NWSL offseason, Celia joined Australian W-League club Perth Glory in November 2019 on loan for the 2019–20 W-League season. She made nine appearances and scored three goals.

With the 2020 NWSL season disrupted by the COVID-19 pandemic, Celia played for the newly rebranded OL Reign during the 2020 NWSL Challenge Cup before missing the four-game friendly Fall Series to join Division 1 Féminine side and sister club of the OL Reign, Olympique Lyonnais, on loan until June 2021. She ultimately didn't make an appearance for the team and was recalled from loan in February to prepare for Reign preseason. Despite not playing, Celia stated: "Being at OL pushed me to keep growing and developing as a player. I am very grateful for the opportunity both clubs gave to me." Ahead of the 2021 season, Celia also received a permanent resident green card meaning she no longer occupied an NWSL international roster spot.

=== Orlando Pride ===
On 18 December 2021, Celia was traded during the 2022 NWSL Draft along with Leah Pruitt, the 10th overall pick, and a second-round pick in the 2023 NWSL Draft to Orlando Pride in exchange for Phoebe McClernon.

On 7 November 2024, Celia announced that she would retire from professional football at the conclusion of the 2024 NWSL season.

== International career ==
=== Youth ===
Celia has represented Spain at multiple youth levels, captaining both the under-17 and under-19 teams. She was part of the team that won the 2011 UEFA Women's Under-17 Championship, and also finished as runner-up at the 2014 UEFA Women's Under-19 Championship.

=== Senior ===
Celia made her senior international debut aged 19 on 17 September 2014, starting against the Czech Republic during 2015 FIFA Women's World Cup qualification but had to be substituted after 25 minutes with an injury. With only three caps for Spain, Celia was included in the squad for the 2015 FIFA Women's World Cup, the youngest player in the squad. She started in all three of Spain's group stage games in the country's first appearance at a FIFA Women's World Cup. Spain were eliminated as bottom of the group having lost to Brazil and South Korea, and drew with Costa Rica.

In 2017, Celia was named to her second successive major tournament squad as Spain contested the UEFA Women's Euro 2017. She was an unused substitute behind Marta Torrejón in all four games as Spain were eliminated on penalties by Austria in the quarter-finals.

In 2018, Celia was part of the squad that won the 2018 Cyprus Women's Cup.

In 2019, Celia was called up for the 2019 FIFA Women's World Cup. She made one appearance, as an 86th-minute substitute in a goalless draw with China in the group. Spain were eliminated in the round of 16 by eventual winners United States.

== Career statistics ==
=== College summary ===
| School | Season | Division | Apps | Goals |
|---|---|---|---|---|
| Iowa Western Reivers | 2013 | NJCAA | 23 | 21 |
| Iowa Western Reivers | 2014 | NJCAA | 10 | 8 |
| Iowa Western Reivers | Total | | 33 | 29 |
| Alabama Crimson Tide | 2015 | NCAA | 19 | 4 |
| Alabama Crimson Tide | 2016 | NCAA | 0 | 0 |
| Alabama Crimson Tide | 2017 | NCAA | 20 | 3 |
| Alabama Crimson Tide | Total | | 39 | 7 |
| Career total | | | 72 | 36 |

=== Club summary ===
As of 24 November 2024

| Club | Season | League | | | Cup (Note: Svenska Cupen, NWSL Challenge Cup) | | Playoffs | | Continental (Note: UEFA Women's Champions League) | | Total | |
| Club | Season | Division | Apps | Goals | Apps | Goals | Apps | Goals | Apps | Goals | Apps | Goals |
|---|---|---|---|---|---|---|---|---|---|---|---|---|
| FC Rosengård | 2018 | Damallsvenskan | 9 | 1 | 1 | 0 | — | | 4 | 0 | 14 | 1 |
| OL Reign | 2019 | NWSL | 12 | 1 | — | | 1 | 0 | — | | 13 | 1 |
| OL Reign | 2020 | NWSL | — | | 4 | 0 | — | | — | | 4 | 0 |
| OL Reign | 2021 | NWSL | 12 | 0 | 4 | 1 | 0 | 0 | — | | 16 | 1 |
| OL Reign | Total | | 24 | 1 | 8 | 1 | 1 | 0 | 0 | 0 | 33 | 2 |
| Perth Glory (loan) | 2019–20 | W-League | 9 | 3 | — | | — | | — | | 9 | 3 |
| Lyon (loan) | 2020–21 | Division 1 | 0 | 0 | 0 | 0 | — | | 0 | 0 | 0 | 0 |
| Orlando Pride | 2022 | NWSL | 18 | 2 | 3 | 0 | — | | — | | 21 | 2 |
| Orlando Pride | 2023 | NWSL | 8 | 0 | 2 | 0 | — | | — | | 10 | 0 |
| Orlando Pride | 2024 | NWSL | 3 | 0 | — | | 1 | 0 | | | 4 | 0 |
| Orlando Pride | Total | | 29 | 2 | 5 | 0 | 1 | 0 | 0 | 0 | 35 | 2 |
| Career total | | | 71 | 7 | 14 | 1 | 2 | 0 | 4 | 0 | 91 | 8 |

=== International summary ===
As of 31 December 2023

Spain
| Year | Apps | Goals |
|---|---|---|
| 2014 | 1 | 0 |
| 2015 | 6 | 0 |
| 2016 | 3 | 0 |
| 2017 | 0 | 0 |
| 2018 | 7 | 0 |
| 2019 | 6 | 0 |
| Total | 23 | 0 |

== Honours ==
Iowa Western Reivers

- NJCAA National Championship: 2013

Seattle Sounders

- Women's Premier Soccer League Championship: 2018

Orlando Pride

- NWSL Shield: 2024
- NWSL Championship: 2024

Spain U17

- UEFA Women's Under-17 Championship: 2011

Spain

- Cyprus Women's Cup: 2018
