= Leah Pruitt =

American soccer player

Personal information
- Date of birth: September 5, 1997 (age 29)
- Place of birth: Rancho Cucamonga, California, United States
- Height: 5 ft 8 in (1.73 m)
- Position: Forward

Youth career
- Sporting California Arsenal
- 2012–2016: West Coast FC
- 2016: Slammers FC

College career
Years	Team	Apps	(Gls)
2015	San Diego State Aztecs	18	(10)
2016–2018	USC Trojans	63	(22)

Senior career*
Years	Team	Apps	(Gls)
2018	LA Villa	5	(4)
2019	North Carolina Courage	14	(2)
2020–2021	OL Reign	11	(0)
2022–2023	Orlando Pride	13	(1)
Total		43	(7)

International career
2014	United States U17		
2015–16	United States U19		
2014	United States U20		
2018	United States U23		
- * Club domestic league appearances and goals

Leah Pruitt (born September 5, 1997) is an American former professional soccer player who played as a forward. Sheplayed college soccer for the San Diego State Aztecs and USC Trojans, winning the 2016 National Championship title with USC. She was selected 5th overall in the 2019 NWSL College Draft and played professionally for four seasons in the National Women's Soccer League with North Carolina Courage, OL Reign and Orlando Pride, winning both the NWSL Championship and NWSL Shield as a rookie in 2019.

== Early life ==
Growing up in Rancho Cucamonga, California, Pruitt was a four-year varsity player at Alta Loma High School, breaking the school record for goals in a single season in 2015 with 41 and was a three-time all-league honoree. She began playing club soccer at Sporting California Arsenal FC. On June 27, 2012, the team won the Elite Clubs National League (ECNL) under-14 National Championship, beating San Diego Surf 2–0 in the final held in Chicago. She later moved to West Coast FC, helping the team reach another ECNL National Championship final. In June 2016, Pruitt won the ECNL under-18 National Championship title with Slammers FC, scoring in a 2–0 victory over Michigan Hawks in the final. Pruitt was also a five-year member of the Cal South PRO+ Olympic Development Program.

== College career ==
=== San Diego State Aztects ===
Pruitt was scouted by San Diego State University when her father contacted the coaches about her older sister Charlee's interest in joining the team as a goalkeeper. Head coach Mike Friesen came to watch their club team play a tournament in Arizona in summer 2012 and, although he had a backlog of goalkeepers, Friesen was interested in signing the team's 4 ft 11in forward, Leah. She committed that December, two years before she could sign a national letter of intent: "SDSU really wanted me, you could tell. I loved how the coaches were really into me coming here. I knew it was the right choice."

Pruitt was 5 ft 8in by the time she debuted for the Aztecs in 2015 and was an immediate starter, starting all 18 games before a knee injury kept her out of the final two games of the season. As a freshman, Pruitt led the team with 10 goals and nine assists. She was named Mountain West Conference Freshman of the Year and was an All-Mountain West first team selection as the Aztecs won the regular season title and finished as runners-up in the conference tournament, losing the final to San Jose State Spartans in a penalty shootout.

=== USC Trojans ===
Pruitt transferred to the University of Southern California in 2016. She made 21 appearances for the USC Trojans as a sophomore, all as a substitute, scoring four goals and creating eight assists. USC won the 2016 NCAA Division I Women's Soccer Tournament title with a 3–1 win against West Virginia. Pruitt registered an assist on a Katie Johnson goal during the final.

In her junior year, Pruitt started all 20 games, scoring six goals and four assists on her way to All Pac-12 Conference second team honors. In 2018, Pruitt played in all 22 games (starting 21), and put up career-high numbers in both goals with 12 and assists with nine. She earned All Pac-12 and All-Pacific Region first team honors, and was recognized nationally with United Soccer Coaches All-America third team and TopDrawerSoccer.com Best XI third team honors.

== Club career ==
=== LA Villa ===
In 2018, Pruitt played for LA Villa in the Women's Premier Soccer League. She scored four goals and registered two assists in five appearances as LA Villa finished third in the Coastal Conference. She was named Coastal Conference Offensive Player of the Year at the end of season awards in August 2018.

=== North Carolina Courage ===
Pruitt was drafted in the first round (5th overall) of the 2019 NWSL College Draft by the North Carolina Courage. She made her professional debut in the season opener on April 13, 2019, entering as a 71st-minute substitute for McCall Zerboni in a 1–1 tie with Chicago Red Stars. She scored her first goal on April 28 as part of a 4–1 win away at Houston Dash. In total, Pruitt played 556 minutes in 11 appearances as a rookie, scoring two goals and an assist before a knee injury sidelined her for the final two months including North Carolina's run to the NWSL Championship title having also won the NWSL Shield.

With the 2020 season disrupted by the COVID-19 pandemic during preseason in March, the season didn't start until the 2020 NWSL Challenge Cup in June. Still injured, Pruitt was waived by North Carolina on June 23 as part of the Challenge Cup squad announcement.

=== OL Reign ===
Four days after being waived by North Carolina, Pruitt was selected off waivers by OL Reign and immediately placed on the team's 45-day disabled list. "Since I was going through an injury, it was hard in the beginning. Once I got picked up by OL Reign, it was super exciting. It sparked my fire to come up here and be a part of this club." With no regular season following the conclusion of the Challenge Cup, the NWSL scheduled a replacement Fall Series. Pruitt made her club debut in the team's opening Fall Series game on September 26 as a 70th-minute substitute for Jasmyne Spencer in a 2–2 tie with Utah Royals. Pruitt played a total of 132 minutes across all four Fall Series games and scored her first Reign goal in the final game of the series on October 17 having also made her first start for the team in a 2–0 win over Utah.

Ahead of the 2021 season, Pruitt signed a new three-year contract with OL Reign. On the signing, head coach Farid Benstiti said "Leah has exceeded all expectations since she joined our club before the Challenge Cup. She worked incredibly hard to recover from injury, which enabled her to make impact in each of our matches in the Fall Series. We believe Leah has tremendous potential and I am excited to be working with her this season." She played 15 games in all competitions, scoring once during the 2021 NWSL Challenge Cup.

=== Orlando Pride ===
On December 18, 2021, Pruitt was traded during the 2022 NWSL Draft by new Reign head coach Laura Harvey along with Celia, the 10th overall pick, and a second-round pick in the 2023 NWSL Draft to Orlando Pride in exchange for Phoebe McClernon.

On April 6, 2023, after not featuring in either of the matchday squads for the opening two games of the season, Orlando Pride announced Pruitt had retired from professional soccer in order to pursue new career opportunities.

== International career ==
In August 2011, Pruitt was invited to the annual U.S. under-14 National Team Identification Camp held in Portland, Oregon. It featured 72 players and was run by U.S. Soccer Women's Development Director Jill Ellis. In January 2014, Pruitt was called up to the under-17 national team by B. J. Snow for a 24-player training camp at the U.S. Soccer National Training Center in Carson, California. In October 2014, Pruitt was named to an under-20 training camp by Michelle French, and attended a further two training camps with the under-19s in July 2015 and May 2016 in the build-up to the 2016 FIFA U-20 Women's World Cup. In May 2018, Pruitt was called up to an under-23 training camp.

== Personal life ==
Pruitt's father, Aaron, played football as an inside linebacker at San Diego State in the mid-1990s. Her older sister, Charlee, also played soccer and was a four-year starter as a goalkeeper at Loyola Marymount 2015 to 2018.

She married Dylan Lowenstein in June 2025.

== Career statistics ==
=== College ===
School	Season	Division	Apps	Goals
San Diego State Aztecs	2015	Div. I	18	10
USC Trojans	2016	Div. I	21	4
USC Trojans	2017	Div. I	20	6
USC Trojans	2018	Div. I	22	12
USC Trojans	Total		63	22
Career total			81	32

=== Club ===
As of October 1, 2022.

Club	Season	League			Cup (Note: NWSL Challenge Cup)		Playoffs (Note: NWSL Playoffs)		Other		Total	
Club	Season	Division	Apps	Goals	Apps	Goals	Apps	Goals	Apps	Goals	Apps	Goals
LA Villa	2018	WPSL	5	4	—		—		—		5	4
North Carolina Courage	2019	NWSL	14	2	—		0	0	—		14	2
OL Reign	2020	NWSL	—		0	0	—		4 (Note: Includes the NWSL Fall Series)	1	4	1
OL Reign	2021	NWSL	11	0	4	1	0	0	—		15	1
OL Reign	Total		11	0	4	1	0	0	4	1	19	2
Orlando Pride	2022	NWSL	13	1	3	0	—		—		16	1
Career total			43	7	7	1	0	0	4	1	54	9

== Honors ==
San Diego State Aztecs

- Mountain West Conference regular season: 2015

USC Trojans

- NCAA Women's College Cup: 2016

North Carolina Courage

- NWSL Championship: 2019
- NWSL Shield: 2019

Individual

- Mountain West Conference Freshman of the Year: 2015
