= Machaela George =

American soccer player

Personal information
- Full name: Machaela Marie George
- Date of birth: October 3, 1997 (age 29)
- Place of birth: San Clemente, California, United States
- Height: 5 ft 7 in (1.70 m)
- Position: Defender

College career
| Years | Team | Apps | (Gls) |
| 2016–2019 | Santa Clara Broncos | 88 | (6) |

Senior career*
| Years | Team | Apps | (Gls) |
| 2020–2021 | OL Reign | 1 | (0) |
| 2020 | → Fortuna Hjørring (loan) | 6 | (1) |
| 2021–2022 | SC Braga | | |
- * Club domestic league appearances and goals as of May 24, 2021

Machaela Marie George (born October 3, 1997) is an American professional soccer player who last played as a defender for Liga BPI club SC Braga.

== Club career ==
George made her NWSL debut on May 23, 2021. She was waived on September 29, 2021.
