= Taylor Smith (soccer, born 1993) =

American soccer player (born 1993)

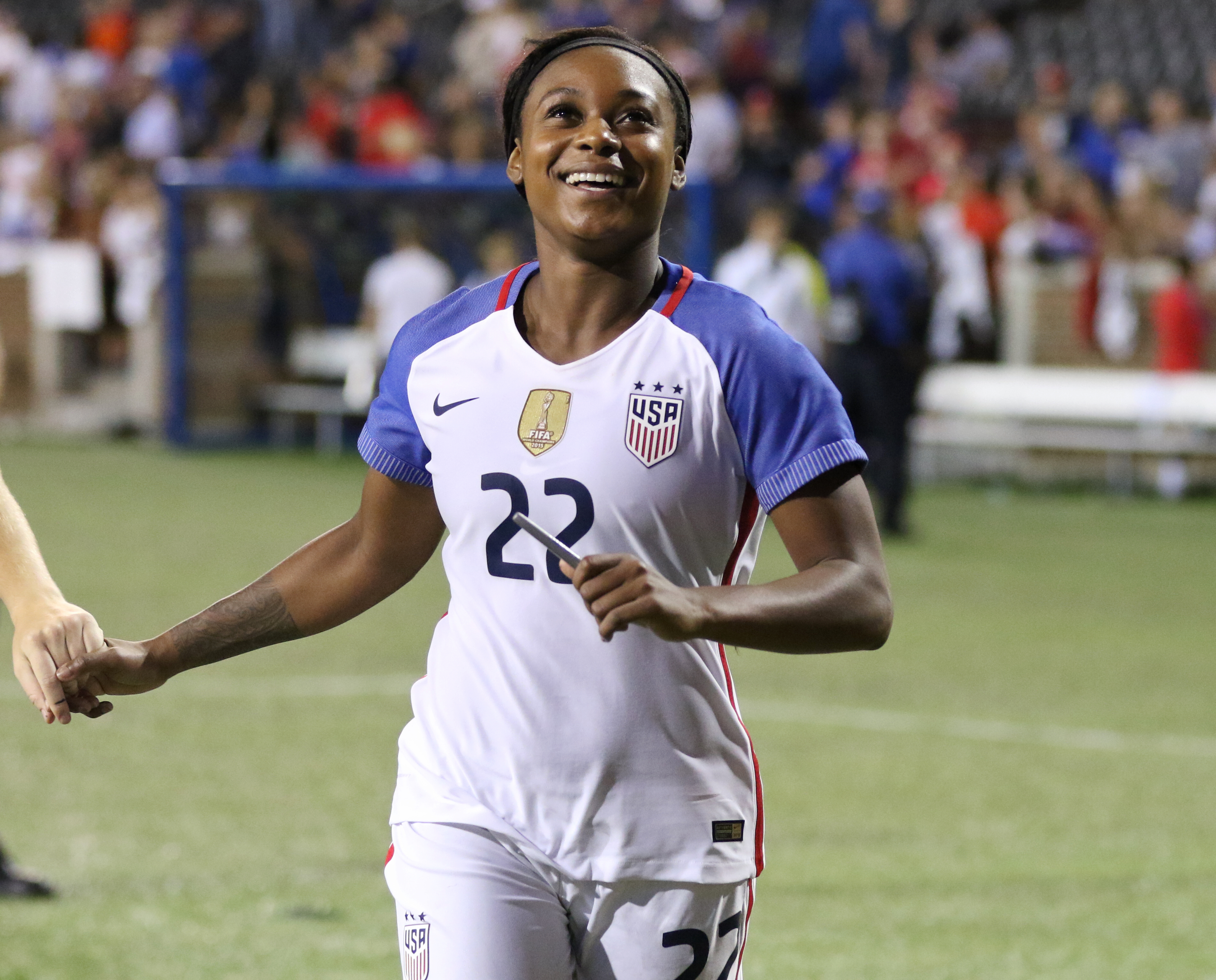
- Smith with the United States in 2017

Personal information
- Full name: Taylor Nicole Smith
- Date of birth: December 1, 1993 (age 32)
- Place of birth: Fort Worth, Texas, United States
- Height: 5 ft 3 in (1.60 m)
- Position: Defender

College career
Years	Team	Apps	(Gls)
2012–2015	UCLA Bruins	87	(27)

Senior career*
Years	Team	Apps	(Gls)
2016	Western New York Flash	20	(2)
2017	North Carolina Courage	26	(0)
2018	Washington Spirit	23	(0)
2018	→ Newcastle Jets (loan)	6	(0)
2019–2020	OL Reign	3	(0)
2021–2022	North Carolina Courage	17	(0)
2022–2024	NJ/NY Gotham FC	22	(3)
2024	→ Brighton & Hove Albion (loan)	0	(0)
2024–2025	Brooklyn FC	0	(0)
2025	León	8	(2)

International career^{‡}
2010	United States U17	5	(7)
2011	United States U20		
2014–2016	United States U23		
2017–2018	United States	10	(0)
- * Club domestic league appearances and goals as of August 23, 2024 ‡ National team caps and goals as of August 23, 2024

Taylor Nicole Smith (born December 1, 1993) is an American former professional soccer player.

Smith played college soccer for the UCLA Bruins and helped the team to its first-ever national title in 2013. She played eight seasons in the National Women's Soccer League (NWSL) for the Western New York Flash, North Carolina Courage, Washington Spirit, OL Reign, and NJ/NY Gotham FC. She won NWSL Championships with the Flash in 2016 and Gotham in 2023. She represented the United States at youth and senior levels, earning 10 caps with the senior national team.

== Early life ==
Born and raised in Fort Worth, Texas, Smith attended Fort Worth Country Day School where she captained the varsity soccer team for three years. She also played field hockey and ran track and field. Smith earned conference honors in both soccer and track. She was ranked as the eighth top national college recruit by Top Drawer Soccer and ESPN. Top Drawer Soccer ranked her as the top recruit in the state of Texas and she was twice named Youth All-American by the National Soccer Coaches Association of America (NSCAA). The Fort Worth Star-Telegram named Smith to their Super Team twice.

Smith played club soccer for Solar Chelsea. She helped the LA Blues win the USL W-League title in 2014.

=== UCLA Bruins, 2012–2015 ===
Smith attended UCLA where she played for the Bruins from 2012 to 2015. During her freshman season, she played in all 23 games, starting 17. Her three goals ranked eighth in the Pac-12 Conference and 20 points ranked tenth in points. Smith was named to the Pac-12 All-Freshman Team Top Drawer Soccer All-Freshman Team. During her sophomore season, her 8 goals ranked second on the team. Her 11 assists and 26 points both ranked third in the Pac-12. Smith started in 25 of the 26 games in which she played. During the NCAA Division 1 quarterfinals, she scored the game-winning golden goal in double overtime to lift the team past North Carolina and into the semifinals. Her three goals during the tournament helped the team clinch its first NCAA Division 1 College Cup title. Smith was named to the All-Pac-12 first team. During her junior season, Smith started in all 24 games. Her nine goals scored and four game-winning goals tied for second on the team. Her 23 points ranked third on the team and eighth in the conference. As a senior, she co-captained the team and was named to the MAC Hermann Trophy Watch List.

== Club career ==
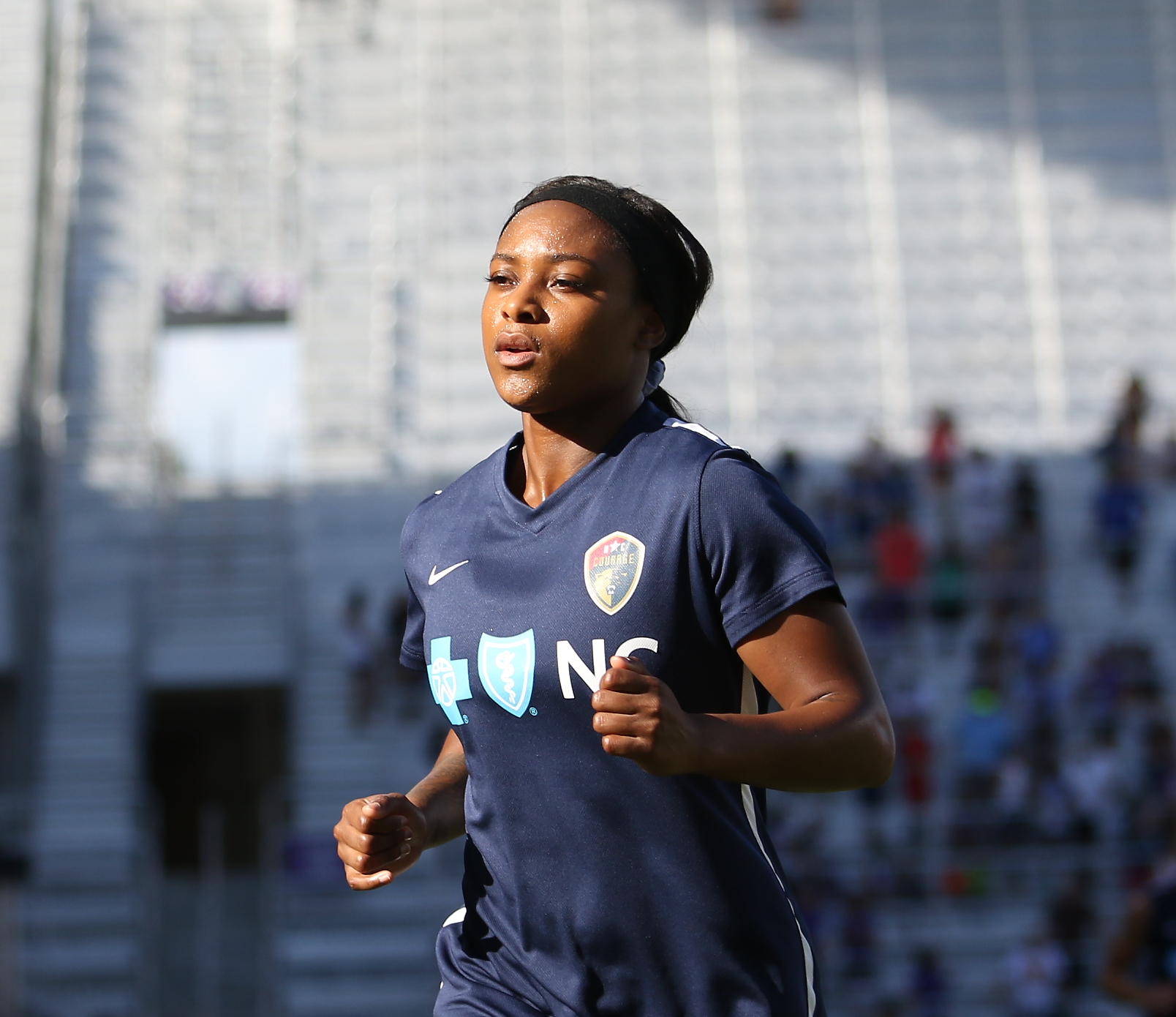
Taylor Smith with the North Carolina Courage in 2017

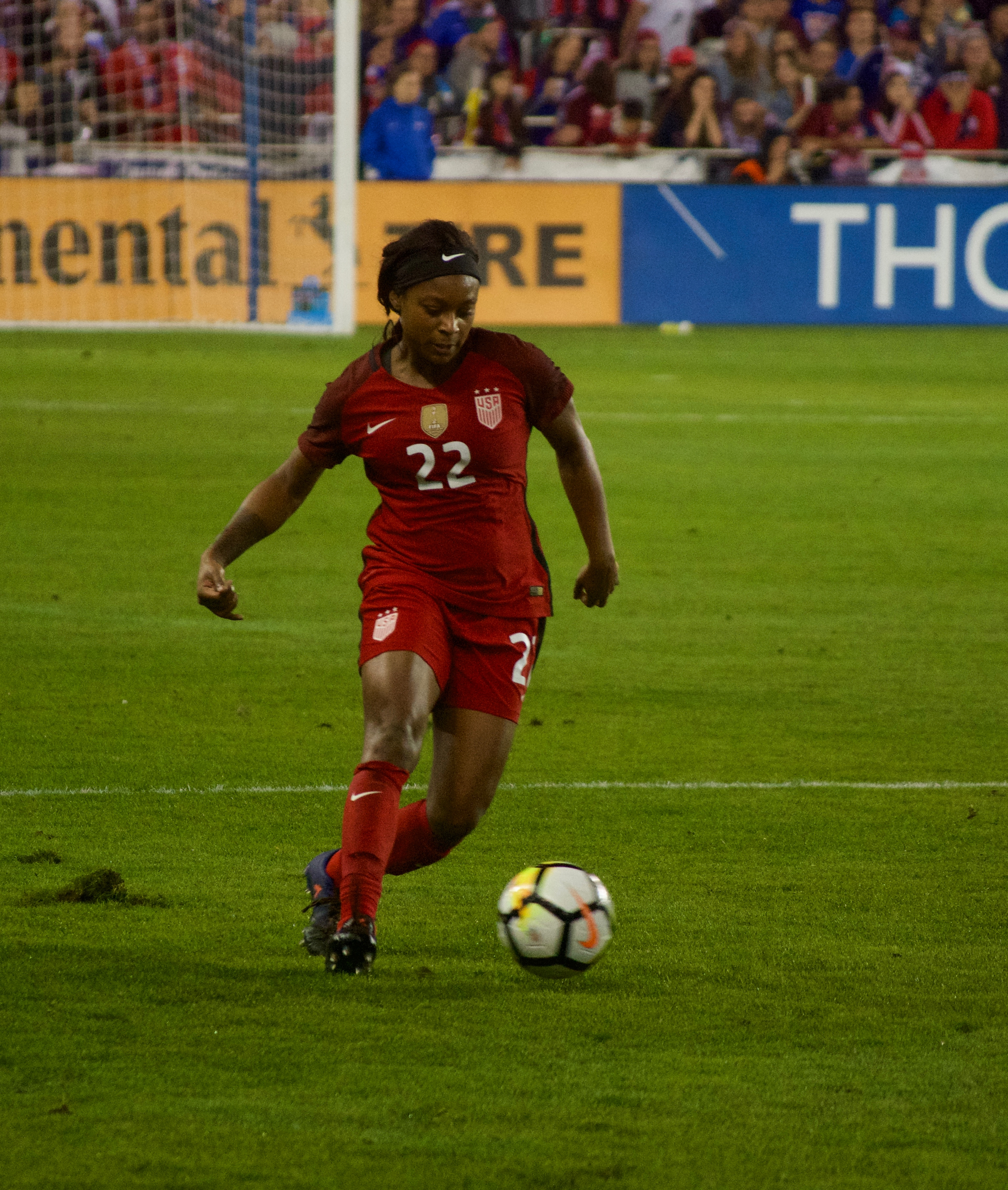
Playing in a friendly for the national team in 2017

=== Western New York Flash/North Carolina Courage, 2016–2017 ===
Smith was named to the Western New York Flash opening day roster for the 2016 NWSL season. She made twenty appearances for the club and scored two goals. The team's fourth-place finish during the regular season with a 9–6–5 record secured the team a berth to the playoffs. After defeating the Portland Thorns FC 4–3 in extra time during the semifinal, the Flash faced the Washington Spirit in the final and won the game in a penalty kick shootout after finishing 2–2 in extra time. Three months after the win, the Western New York Flash was sold to the ownership group of North Carolina FC and moved to Cary, North Carolina where they became the North Carolina Courage.

=== Washington Spirit, 2018 ===
In January 2018, Smith was traded to the Washington Spirit along with teammate Ashley Hatch in exchange for Crystal Dunn's rights. Prior to the start of the season, Smith was added to the allocated player list by U.S. Soccer. She appeared in 23 games for Washington in the 2018 season.

==== Loan to Newcastle Jets, 2018 ====
In October 2018, after the conclusion NWSL season, Smith signed with the Newcastle Jets on loan for the 2018–19 W-League season. She became a key player in her first several appearances, earning the team's Player of the Month honors in November. In mid-December, Smith suffered an ACL tear in the 86th minute against Perth Glory after having registered two assists to fellow on-loan American, Katie Stengel.

=== Reign FC, 2019–2020 ===
On March 22, 2019, Reign FC announced that they had signed Smith through the discovery process for former allocated players. Due to the injury she suffered in the W-League, Smith was not expected to play during the 2019 NWSL season.

=== North Carolina Courage, 2021–2022 ===
On December 7, 2020, Smith was acquired by North Carolina Courage in a trade for Ally Watt. She parted ways with the club on June 21, 2022.

=== NJ/NY Gotham FC, 2022–2024 ===
On June 24, 2022, NJ/NY Gotham FC signed Smith off waivers.

==== Loan to Brighton & Hove Albion, 2024 ====
On January 31, 2023, Smith signed for Brighton & Hove Albion on loan for the remainder of the season.

=== Brooklyn FC, 2024–2025 ===
On August 1, 2024, Smith joined Brooklyn FC ahead of their inaugural season in the USL Super League. Smith departed Brooklyn FC by mutual consent in January 2025.

=== León, 2025– ===
Smith joined Mexican club León in February 2025.

== International career ==
In January 2017, Smith was called into training camp for the United States women's national soccer team for the first time by head coach Jill Ellis. She earned her first cap for the team on July 27 when she started in the right back defender position during a match in Seattle against Australia at the 2017 Tournament of Nations.

Smith was named to the U.S. roster for the 2018 SheBelieves Cup, she started two games as the United States won the tournament for the second time.

== Personal life ==
Smith came out publicly as a lesbian in 2017.

In 2024, Smith appeared in the first season of The Offseason, a reality television series following a group of NWSL players training before the new season.

== Career statistics ==
=== Club ===
As of August 23, 2024.

Appearances and goals by club, season and competition
Club	Season	League			League Cup (Note: Includes the NWSL Challenge Cup)		Total	
Club	Season	Division	Apps	Goals	Apps	Goals	Apps	Goals
Western New York Flash	2016	NWSL	20	2	—		20	2
North Carolina Courage	2017	NWSL	26	0	—		26	0
Washington Spirit	2018	NWSL	23	0	—		23	0
Newcastle Jets (loan)	2018–19	W-League	6	0	—		6	0
OL Reign	2020	NWSL	3	0	4	0	7	0
OL Reign	2021	NWSL	0	0				
North Carolina Courage	2021	NWSL	13	0	1	0	14	0
North Carolina Courage	2022	NWSL	4	0	8	2	12	2
NJ/NY Gotham FC	2022	NWSL	14	2	0	0	14	2
NJ/NY Gotham FC	2023	NWSL	8	1	5	0	13	1
NJ/NY Gotham FC	2024	NWSL	0	0	0	0		
Brighton & Hove Albion (loan)	2023–24	WSL	0	0	0	0	0	0
Brooklyn FC	2024–	USL Super League	0	0	0	0	0	0
Career total			117	5	18	2	135	7

== Honors ==
UCLA Bruins

- NCAA Women's Soccer Championship: 2013

Western New York Flash

- NWSL Champions: 2016

North Carolina Courage

- NWSL Shield: 2017

NJ/NY Gotham FC

- NWSL Championship: 2023

United States

- SheBelieves Cup: 2018
