= Julia Spetsmark =

Swedish footballer (born 1989)

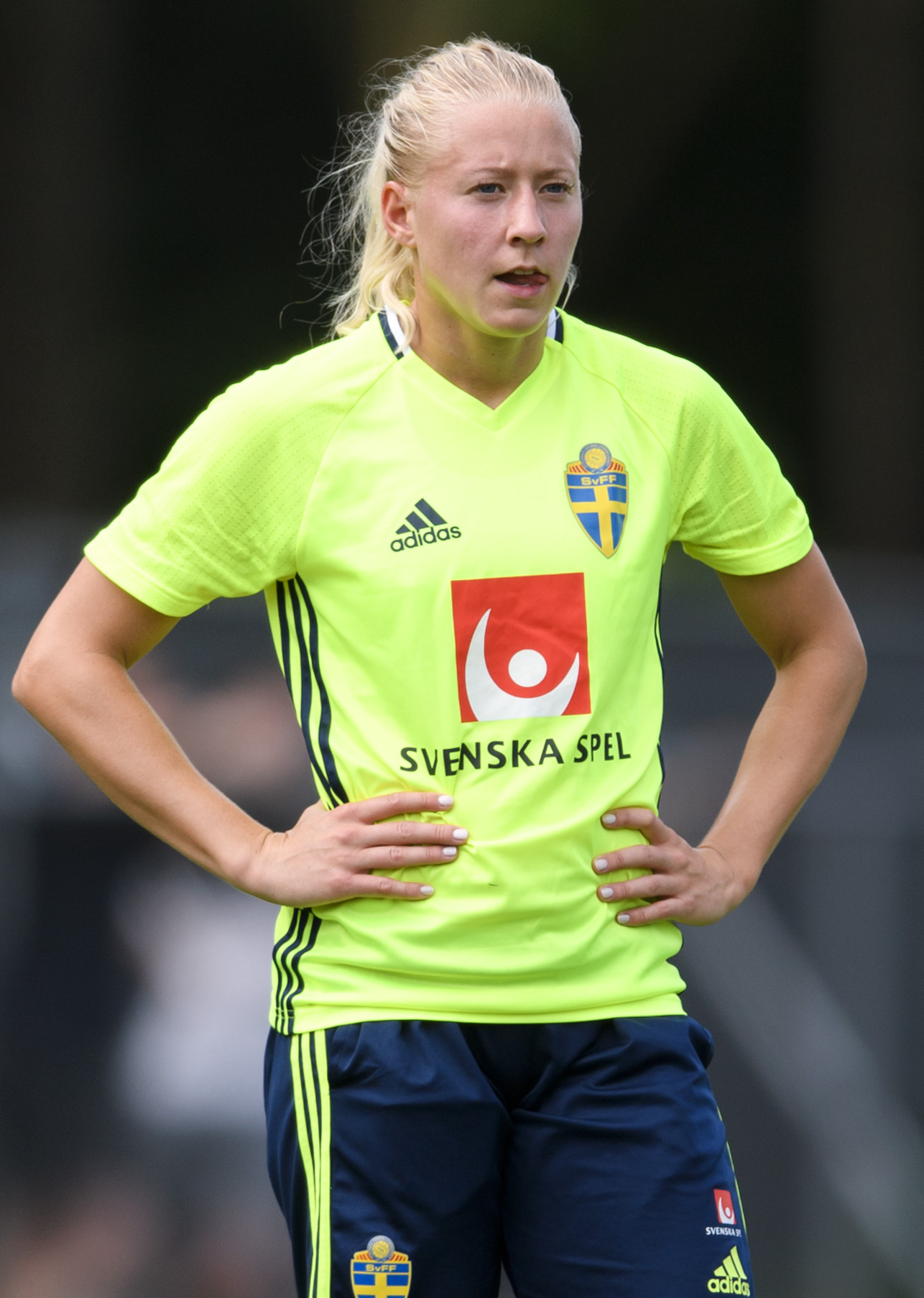

Personal information
- Full name: Julia Paulina Sofie Spetsmark
- Date of birth: 30 June 1989 (age 37)
- Place of birth: Sweden
- Height: 1.65 m (5 ft 5 in)
- Position: Midfielder

Senior career*
Years	Team	Apps	(Gls)
2011–2012	QBIK	45	(23)
2013	Sunnanå SK	21	(3)
2014–2017	KIF Örebro DFF	84	(12)
2018	Manchester City	3	(0)
2018–2019	Djurgården	11	(6)
2019	North Carolina Courage	14	(3)
2020	Benfica	5	(6)
2020-2021	FC Fleury 91	10	(2)
2021	Apollon Limassol	1	(0)

International career^{‡}
2005	Sweden U17	1	(0)
2012	Sweden U23	3	(0)
2016–	Sweden	4	(0)
- * Club domestic league appearances and goals as of 15 June 2019 ‡ National team caps and goals as of 20 December 2017

Julia Paulina Sofie Spetsmark (born 30 June 1989) is a Swedish former professional footballer.

== Club career ==
Spetsmark made her debut in the Swedish Damallsvenskan in 2006 for Mallbackens IF at the age of 17 and has made over 100 appearances in the league. She played in the UEFA Women's Champions League for KIF Örebro in 2015. After spending four years playing for KIF Örebro DFF,

=== Manchester City ===
Spetsmark signed with Manchester City in the FA WSL, in January 2017.

=== Djurgården ===
After Manchester City season, Spetsmark returned to the Damallsvenskan, signing with Djurgården on 23 July 2018 where she scored 6 goals and had 2 assists in 11 games.

=== North Carolina Courage ===
On 7 January 2019 the North Carolina Courage announced that they had acquired Spetsmark. Spetsmark made her NWSL debut and scored her first Courage goal in a 5–0 win over Orlando Pride on 17 April 2019.

=== Benfica ===
On 24 January 2020, Spetsmark signed with Portuguese club Benfica. She made her debut with the club in a 3–1 win over Braga in Taça da Liga Feminina on 1 February.

== International career ==
Spetsmark got her first senior cap when Sweden played Iran at Gamla Ullevi, Gothenburg, in October 2016. She was selected for the Sweden squad for the UEFA Women's Euro 2017.

== Honours ==
North Carolina Courage

- NWSL Champions: 2019
- NWSL Shield: 2019

Benfica

- Taça da Liga: 2019–20
