= Addison Steiner =

American soccer player

Personal information
- Date of birth: December 19, 1994 (age 31)
- Place of birth: Prairie Village, Kansas, United States
- Height: 5 ft 2 in (1.57 m)
- Position: Striker

College career
| Years | Team | Apps | (Gls) |
| 2013–2015 | Northwestern Wildcats | 62 | (19) |
| 2016 | Hawaii Rainbow Wahine | 17 | (8) |

Senior career*
| Years | Team | Apps | (Gls) |
| 2017 | Östersunds DFF | 12 | (5) |
| 2018–2019 | KIF Örebro | 32 | (14) |
| 2019 | → Reign FC (loan) | 4 | (0) |
| 2019 | Reign FC | 1 | (0) |
- * Club domestic league appearances and goals as of January 19, 2020

Addison Steiner (born December 19, 1994) is an American professional soccer player who last played as a striker for Reign FC of the National Women's Soccer League.

== Early life ==
Steiner was born in Prairie Village, Kansas, and finished her collegiate career with Hawaii Rainbow Wahine in 2016.

== Club career ==
After starting her professional career with Östersunds DFF, Steiner moved to KIF Örebro and helped the club win promotion to the first-division Damallsvenskan in 2018.

On May 23, 2019, Reign FC signed Steiner as a National Team Replacement player on loan from KIF Örebro. Steiner made four substitute appearances for Reign FC before the two clubs agreed to make the loan permanent on July 15, 2019.

On January 18, 2020, Steiner announced that she would be leaving Reign FC and taking time off from professional soccer.
