= Theresa Eslund =

Danish footballer (born 1986)

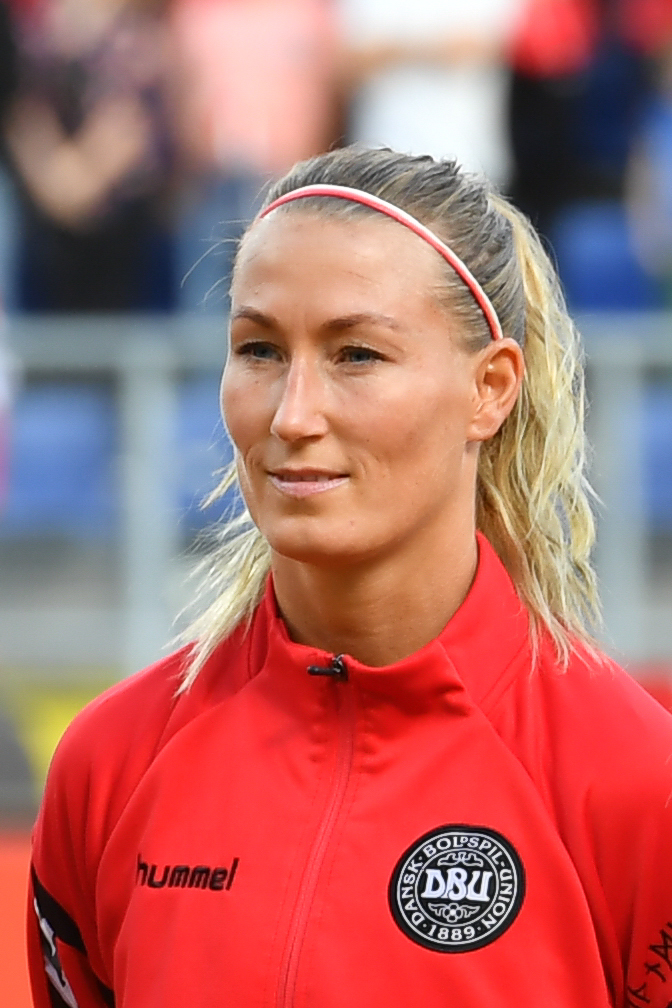
- Eslund in 2017

Personal information
- Full name: Theresa Eslund
- Birth name: Theresa Nielsen
- Date of birth: 20 July 1986 (age 40)
- Height: 1.68 m (5 ft 6 in)
- Position: Right-back

Youth career
- Rikken

Senior career*
Years	Team	Apps	(Gls)
–2002	Hvidovre IF		
2003–2008	BSF		
2009–2016	Brøndby IF	87	(13)
2017	Vålerenga	22	(2)
2018–2019	Seattle Reign	41	(1)
2018–2019	→ Melbourne City (loan)	12	(0)
2020–2021	Brøndby IF	22	(2)

International career
2002–2003	Denmark U-17	15	(3)
2006	Denmark U-21	4	(0)
2009	Denmark U-23	2	(1)
2008–2020	Denmark	133	(5)
Medal record
Women's football
Representing Denmark
UEFA Women's Championship
Silver medal – second place	2017 Netherlands	Team
- * Club domestic league appearances and goals

Theresa Eslund (née Nielsen; born 20 July 1986) is a Danish football coach and former professional footballer who played as a defender for Brøndby IF in the Danish A-Liga and the Danish national team. Eslund works as the Brøndby IF Assistant Coach and Head of Player Development, the former Eslund's first full-time position with the club.

Eslund previously played for Reign FC of the American National Women's Soccer League, Melbourne City of the Australian W-League, and Vålerenga in Norway's Toppserien. She was named Danish Women's Footballer of the Year in 2012. Eslund announced her player retirement in 2021, after more than 20 years as a footballer.

== Early life ==
Raised in Valby, Eslund began playing football at age six on a team known as Rikken.

== Club career ==
=== Brøndby IF, 2009–2016 ===
In 2012, Eslund was named Danish Women's Footballer of the Year after helping Brøndby IF to a league and cup double.

=== Vålerenga, 2017 ===
In January 2017, Eslund signed with Norwegian club, Vålerenga in Oslo, marking her first time playing for a foreign club. Eslund made 22 appearances for Vålerenga and scored two goals during the 2017 season. She scored her first goal for Vålerenga in the 47th minute of a match against Kolbotn resulting in a 2–0 win. The club finished in seventh place with a 10–8–4 record. Eslund was named one of the top 200 players in the world for 2017 by The Offside Rule, a podcast by The Guardian.

=== Reign FC, 2018–2019 ===
Eslund signed with American side Reign FC ahead of the 2018 National Women's Soccer League season in January 2018. She made her debut for Seattle as a starting defender during the home opener — a 2–1 win over the Washington Spirit on 24 March.

=== Return to Brøndby IF ===
Eslund returned to Brøndby IF on a two-year contract in 2020, were the team ended up at second place in the league.

== International career ==
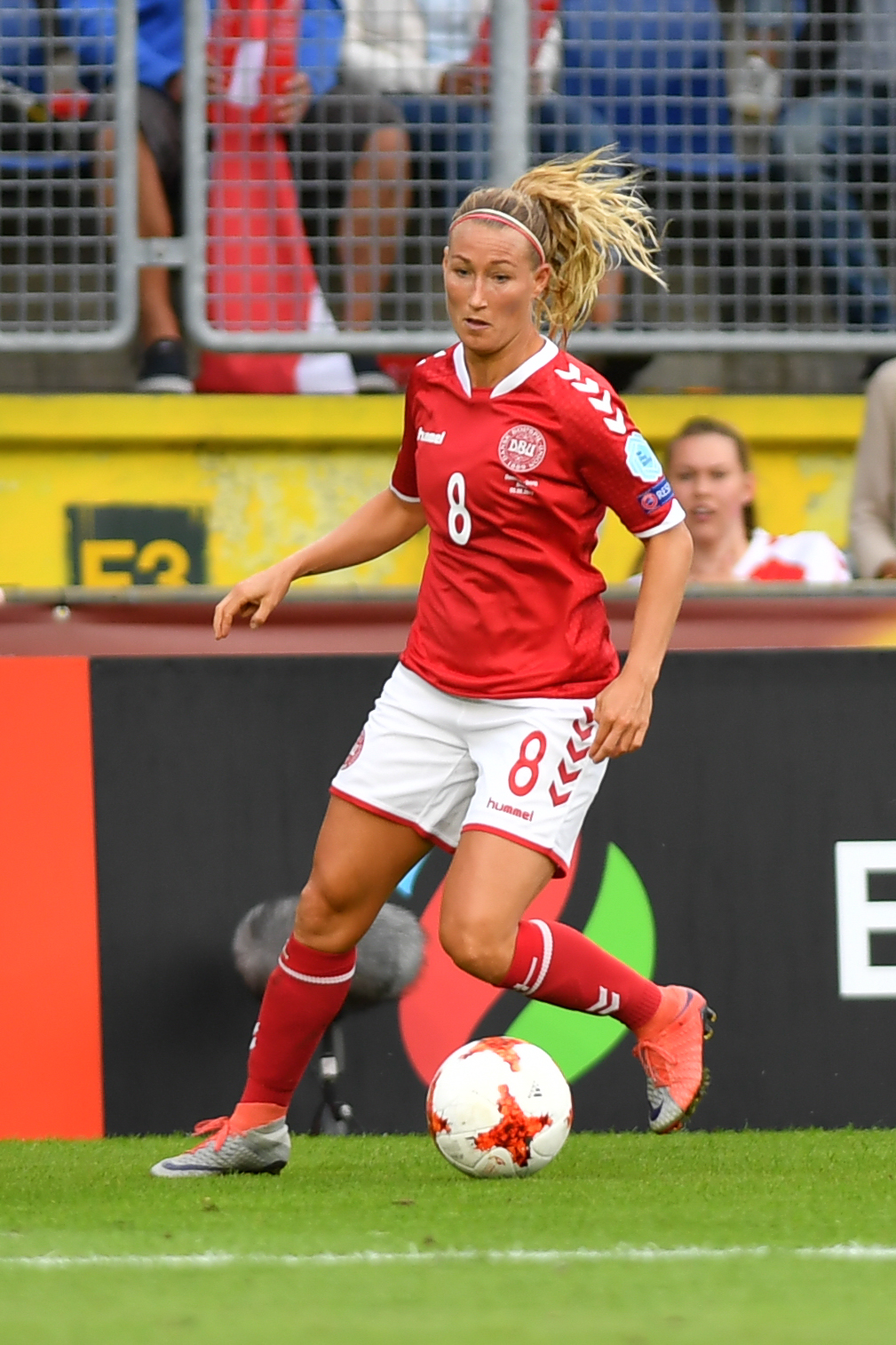
Nielsen during the UEFA Women's Euro 2017 semi-final against Austria.

At age 17, Eslund competed with the Denmark's under-17 national team at the 2003 European Youth Summer Olympic Festival. She scored in the final as Denmark beat Switzerland on penalties after a 1–1 draw at Stade Sébastien Charléty in Paris.

Eslund made her senior international debut for Denmark in March 2008, during the team's 1–0 win over Germany at the 2008 Algarve Cup.

She was called up to Kenneth Heiner-Møller's squad for UEFA Women's Euro 2013 and she was also part of Danish squad, who received silver at the UEFA Women's Euro 2017 in Netherlands.

== Honours ==
Brøndby IF

- Elitedivisionen: Winner 2011, 2012, 2013, 2015, 2017
- Danish Women's Cup: Winner 2010, 2011, 2012, 2013, 2014, 2015, 2017

Denmark

- UEFA Women's Euro 2017 runners-up

Individual

- UEFA Women's Euro 2017 Best XI
- Toppserien Defender of the Year: 2017

== Personal life ==
Formerly known as Theresa Nielsen, Eslund began using her married name in 2020.

== See also ==
- List of women's footballers with 100 or more international caps
