= 2024 NWSL x Liga MX Femenil Summer Cup group stage =

2024 soccer tournament in North America

The 2024 NWSL x Liga MX Femenil Summer Cup group stage consisted of a total of 20 teams competing across 5 groups to decide 4 places in the knockout stage of the 2024 NWSL x Liga MX Femenil Summer Cup. Each group had four teams, which played each other once each in a round-robin format. If a game was tied after 90 minutes, a penalty shoot-out was held. Three points were awarded for a win in regulation time, two points for a penalty shoot-out win, one point for a penalty shoot-out loss, and no points for a regulation-time loss.

== Tiebreakers ==
If two or more clubs in the same group had an equal number of points after the completion of group play, the following criteria, in the order below, were applied to determine the preliminary round ranking:

1. Goal differential in all group play games;
2. Most goals scored in all group play games;
3. Most points obtained in the group games between the tied clubs;
4. Goal differential from the group games between the tied clubs;
5. Most goals scored in all group games between the tied clubs;
6. Least disciplinary points accumulated:
  - yellow card: 1 point
  - indirect red card (as a result of two (2) yellow cards): 3 points
  - direct red card: 4 points
  - yellow card and direct red card: 5 points;
7. Should two clubs remain tied after considering disciplinary points, the head-to-head result of the two clubs;
8. Drawing of lots by NWSL x Liga MX Femenil.

== Groups ==
=== Group A ===
Pos	Team	Pld	W	PW	PL	L	GF	GA	GD	Pts	UTA	POR	SEA	TIJ
1	(United States Soccer Federation) Utah Royals	3	2	0	0	1	9	4	+5	6	—	3–1	1–2	5–1
2	(United States Soccer Federation) Portland Thorns FC	3	2	0	0	1	7	3	+4	6	1–3	—	1–0	5–0
3	(United States Soccer Federation) Seattle Reign FC	3	1	0	0	2	4	5	−1	3	2–1	0–1	—	2–3
4	(Mexican Football Federation) Tijuana	3	1	0	0	2	4	12	−8	3	1–5	0–5	3–2	—

Source: NWSL
Rules for classification: tiebreakers
July 19, 2024
9:00 p.m.

Seattle Reign FC	2–1	Utah Royals
Athens 43' (pen.); Huerta 77'	Report	Tucker 49'

Lumen Field, Seattle, United States
Attendance: 2,704
Referee: Elijio Arreguin
July 21, 2024
7:00 p.m.

Portland Thorns FC	5–0	Tijuana
Sinclair 4'; Wade-Katoa 18'; D'Aquila 54'; Dias 67'; Sheva 72'	Report

Providence Park, Portland, United States
Attendance: 15,187
Referee: Osvaldo Delgado-Landeros

July 27, 2024
10:00 p.m.

Utah Royals	3–1	Portland Thorns FC
Betfort 3'; Sentnor 21'; Vasconcelos 76'	Report	Moultrie 86'

America First Field, Sandy, United States
Attendance: 3,238
Referee: Jamie Padilla
July 28, 2024
6:00 p.m.

Seattle Reign FC	2–3	Tijuana
Adames 47'; Mercado 62'	Report	Solórzano 2', 40', 84'

Lumen Field, Seattle, United States
Attendance: 3,494
Referee: Jaclyn Metz

July 31, 2024
10:00 p.m.

Portland Thorns FC	1–0	Seattle Reign FC
Linnehan 40'	Report

Providence Park, Portland, United States
Referee: Corbyn May
July 31, 2024
10:00 p.m.

Utah Royals	5–1	Tijuana
Monaghan 20'; Betfort 44'; Sentnor 48'; Mozingo 64', 90+5'	Report	Solórzano 3'

America First Field, Sandy, United States
Attendance: 4,939
Referee: Anya Voigt

=== Group B ===
Pos	Team	Pld	W	PW	PL	L	GF	GA	GD	Pts	Qualification	LA	SD	AME	BAY
1	(United States Soccer Federation) Angel City FC	3	2	1	0	0	4	1	+3	8	Advances to knockout stage	—	0–0	2–1	2–0
2	(United States Soccer Federation) San Diego Wave FC	3	1	0	1	1	3	3	0	4		0–0	—	0–2	3–1
3	(Mexican Football Federation) Club América	3	1	0	0	2	4	4	0	3		1–2	2–0	—	1–2
4	(United States Soccer Federation) Bay FC	3	1	0	0	2	3	6	−3	3		0–2	1–3	2–1	—

Source: NWSL
Rules for classification: tiebreakers
July 20, 2024
10:00 p.m.

San Diego Wave FC	3–1	Bay FC
Wesley 45+1'; Sánchez 53'; Ali 80'	Report	Moreau 63'

Torero Stadium, San Diego, United States
Attendance: 5,153
Referee: Iryna Petrunok
July 20, 2024
10:00 p.m.

Angel City FC	2–1	Club América
Fuller 29'; Leroux 89'	Report	Palacios 90+3'

Titan Stadium, Fullerton, United States
Attendance: 6,031
Referee: Laura Rodriguez

July 26, 2024
10:00 p.m.

San Diego Wave FC	0–2	Club América
	Report	Luna 78'; Palacios 90+5'

Snapdragon Stadium, San Diego, United States
Attendance: 14,769
July 26, 2024
10:30 p.m.

Bay FC	0–2	Angel City FC
	Report	Bailey 18' (o.g.); Emslie 54'

PayPal Park, San Jose, United States
Attendance: 9,766
Referee: Adam Zarrin

August 1, 2024
10:00 p.m.

Angel City FC	0–0	San Diego Wave FC
	Report
Penalties
Emslie (penalty scored); Press (penalty scored); Thompson (penalty scored); Rodríguez (penalty scored); Fuller (penalty scored)	5–3	(penalty scored) McCaskill; (penalty missed) Ali; (penalty scored) Doniak; (penalty scored) Barcenas

Titan Stadium, Fullerton, United States
Attendance: 7,200
Referee: Jaclyn Metz
August 2, 2024
10:30 p.m.

Bay FC	2–1	Club América
Moreau 7'; Bailey 53'	Report	Camberos 29'

PayPal Park, San Jose, United States
Attendance: 10,192
Referee: Laura Rodriguez

=== Group C ===
Pos	Team	Pld	W	PW	PL	L	GF	GA	GD	Pts	Qualification	KC	HOU	TIG	PAC
1	(United States Soccer Federation) Kansas City Current	3	3	0	0	0	10	2	+8	9	Advances to knockout stage	—	3–1	4–1	3–0
2	(United States Soccer Federation) Houston Dash	3	2	0	0	1	5	4	+1	6		1–3	—	2–1	2–0
3	(Mexican Football Federation) Tigres UANL	3	1	0	0	2	6	8	−2	3		1–4	1–2	—	4–2
4	(Mexican Football Federation) Pachuca	3	0	0	0	3	2	9	−7	0		0–3	0–2	2–4	—

Source: NWSL
Rules for classification: tiebreakers
July 19, 2024
10:00 p.m.

Tigres UANL	4–2	Pachuca
Ovalle 27'; Ferral 49', 78'; Kgatlana 54'	Report	Corral 22', 69'

Estadio Universitario, San Nicolás de los Garza, Mexico
July 20, 2024
8:00 p.m.

Kansas City Current	3–1	Houston Dash
Cooper 1'; LaBonta 68'; Hamilton 83'	Report	Nagasato 20'

CPKC Stadium, Kansas City, United States
Referee: Corbyn May

July 27, 2024
8:00 p.m.

Kansas City Current	3–0	Pachuca
Debinha 12', 28'; Hamilton 32'	Report

CPKC Stadium, Kansas City, United States
July 28, 2024
8:00 p.m.

Houston Dash	2–1	Tigres UANL
Ordóñez 2'; Olivieri 82'	Report	González 45+4'

Shell Energy Stadium, Houston, United States
Referee: Danielle Chesky

August 1, 2024
8:00 p.m.

Houston Dash	2–0	Pachuca
Andressa Alves 18'; Diana Ordóñez 61'	Report

Shell Energy Stadium, Houston, United States
Referee: Shawn Tehini
August 1, 2024
8:00 p.m.

Kansas City Current	4–1	Tigres UANL
LaBonta 23'; Wheeler 29'; Debinha 57'; Hutton 79'	Report	Kgatlana 56'

CPKC Stadium, Kansas City, United States

=== Group D ===
Pos	Team	Pld	W	PW	PL	L	GF	GA	GD	Pts	Qualification	NYJ	CHI	WAS	GUA
1	(United States Soccer Federation) NJ/NY Gotham FC	3	2	1	0	0	4	0	+4	8	Advances to knockout stage	—	0–0	1–0	3–0
2	(United States Soccer Federation) Chicago Red Stars	3	1	0	1	1	3	3	0	4		0–0	—	3–2	0–1
3	(United States Soccer Federation) Washington Spirit	3	1	0	0	2	4	5	−1	3		0–1	2–3	—	2–1
4	(Mexican Football Federation) Guadalajara	3	1	0	0	2	2	5	−3	3		0–3	1–0	1–2	—

Source: NWSL
Rules for classification: tiebreakers
July 20, 2024
6:00 p.m.

Chicago Red Stars	0–0	NJ/NY Gotham FC
	Report
Penalties
Schlegel (penalty scored); Anderson (penalty scored); Bike (penalty scored); Groom (penalty missed); Bianchi (penalty scored)	4–5	(penalty scored) Ryan; (penalty scored) Stevens; (penalty scored) Sheehan; (penalty scored) Stengel; (penalty scored) Edmonds

SeatGeek Stadium, Bridgeview, United States
Attendance: 2,846
Referee: Salvador Flores
July 21, 2024
4:30 p.m.

Washington Spirit	2–1	Guadalajara
Metayer 13'; Silano 47'	Report	Cervantes 68'

Subaru Park, Chester, United States
Attendance: 1,101

July 26, 2024
8:00 p.m.

Chicago Red Stars	0–1	Guadalajara
	Report	Valenzuela 45'

SeatGeek Stadium, Bridgeview, United States
Attendance: 4,785
Referee: Alyssa Nichols
July 28, 2024
6:00 p.m.

NJ/NY Gotham FC	1–0	Washington Spirit
Ryan 62' (pen.)	Report

Subaru Park, Chester, United States
Attendance: 3,523
Referee: Sergii Demianchuk

July 31, 2024
7:30 p.m.

Washington Spirit	2–3	Chicago Red Stars
Sullivan 55' (pen.); Silano 83'	Report	Bike 48'; Joseph 60'; Griffith 89'

City Stadium, Richmond, United States
Referee: Melinda Homa
August 2, 2024
8:00 p.m.

NJ/NY Gotham FC	3–0	Guadalajara
Stengel 31, 71'; Stevens 63'	Report

Red Bull Arena, Harrison, United States
Attendance: 7,460
Referee: Danielle Chesky

=== Group E ===
Pos	Team	Pld	W	PW	PL	L	GF	GA	GD	Pts	Qualification	NC	LOU	ORL	MON
1	(United States Soccer Federation) North Carolina Courage	3	1	2	0	0	5	2	+3	7	Advances to knockout stage	—	1–1	1–1	3–0
2	(United States Soccer Federation) Racing Louisville FC	3	1	1	1	0	5	3	+2	6		1–1	—	1–1	3–1
3	(United States Soccer Federation) Orlando Pride	3	0	1	2	0	4	4	0	4		1–1	1–1	—	2–2
4	(Mexican Football Federation) Monterrey	3	0	0	1	2	3	8	−5	1		0–3	1–3	2–2	—

Source: NWSL
Rules for classification: tiebreakers
July 20, 2024
7:30 p.m.

North Carolina Courage	1–1	Orlando Pride
Matsukubo 45'	Report	Jiménez 82'
Penalties
Jackson (penalty missed); Kurtz (penalty scored); Wingate (penalty scored); Berkely (penalty scored); Pinto (penalty scored); Weatherholt (penalty missed); Miura (penalty scored)	5–4	(penalty scored) Larroquette; (penalty scored) Lemos; (penalty scored) Watt; (penalty scored) Strom; (penalty missed) Jiménez; (penalty missed) McCutcheon; (penalty missed) Duljan

WakeMed Soccer Park, Cary, United States
Attendance: 2,800
Referee: Lorenzo Hernandez
July 20, 2024
8:00 p.m.

Racing Louisville FC	3–1	Monterrey
Sears 36'; Fischer 47'; Borges 71'	Report	Servín 11'

Lynn Family Stadium, Louisville, United States
Attendance: 4,362
Referee: Alex Billeter

July 26, 2024
8:00 p.m.

Racing Louisville FC	1–1	North Carolina Courage
Pickett 66'	Report	Jackson 90+1'
Penalties
Borges (penalty scored); DiGrande (penalty scored); Pickett (penalty scored); Turner (penalty scored); Howell (penalty missed)	4–5	(penalty scored) Jackson; (penalty scored) Kurtz; (penalty scored) Berkely; (penalty scored) Miura; (penalty scored) Lussi

Lynn Family Stadium, Louisville, United States
Attendance: 4,083
July 27, 2024
7:00 p.m.

Orlando Pride	2–2	Monterrey
Kerr 50'; Doyle 83'	Report	Burkenroad 43'; R. Bernal 61'
Penalties
Doyle (penalty scored); Lemos (penalty scored); Yates (penalty scored); Dyke (penalty scored); Kerr (penalty scored)	5–4	(penalty scored) R. Bernal; (penalty scored) García; (penalty missed) van Dongen; (penalty scored) K. Martínez; (penalty scored) Evangelista

Inter&Co Stadium, Orlando, United States
Referee: Shawn Tehini

July 31, 2024
7:00 p.m.

North Carolina Courage	3–0	Monterrey
Sanchez 48'; Hopkins 82'; Mertz 90'	Report

WakeMed Soccer Park, Cary, United States
Attendance: 4,438
Referee: Danielle Chesky
August 1, 2024
7:00 p.m.

Orlando Pride	1–1	Racing Louisville FC
Duljan 38'	Report	Turner 67'
Penalties
Larroquette (penalty scored); Lemos (penalty scored); Doyle (penalty scored); Gautrat (penalty missed); Watt (penalty missed)	3–4	(penalty missed) Howell; (penalty scored) Sears; (penalty scored) DiGrande; (penalty scored) Milliet; (penalty scored) Flint

Inter&Co Stadium, Orlando, United States
Referee: Alejo Calume

=== Ranking of group winners ===
Only the best four group winners qualified for the knockout stage, and their ranking was used for seeding. The tiebreaking rules were as above, although rules 3–5 and 7 did not apply as teams from different groups did not play each other in the group stage.

Pos	Grp	Team	Pld	W	PW	PL	L	GF	GA	GD	Pts	Qualification
1	C	(United States Soccer Federation) Kansas City Current	3	3	0	0	0	10	2	+8	9	Advance to knockout stage.
2	D	(United States Soccer Federation) NJ/NY Gotham FC	3	2	1	0	0	5	0	+5	8	Advance to knockout stage.
3	B	(United States Soccer Federation) Angel City FC	3	2	1	0	0	4	1	+3	8	Advance to knockout stage.
4	E	(United States Soccer Federation) North Carolina Courage	3	1	2	0	0	5	2	+3	7	Advance to knockout stage.
5	A	(United States Soccer Federation) Utah Royals	3	2	0	0	1	9	4	+5	6	

Source: NWSL
Rules for classification: tiebreakers
