= 2024 NWSL Championship =

Women's soccer match in Missouri, US

- Event: NWSL Championship
Orlando Pride	Washington Spirit
1	0
- Date: November 23, 2024
- Venue: CPKC Stadium, Kansas City, Missouri, U.S.
- Most Valuable Player: Barbra Banda (Orlando Pride)
- Referee: Alyssa Nichols
- Attendance: 11,500

The 2024 NWSL Championship was the 11th edition of the NWSL Championship, the championship match of the National Women's Soccer League (NWSL), and took place on November 23, 2024. The Orlando Pride won 1–0 against the Washington Spirit, becoming NWSL champions for the first time. The match was played at CPKC Stadium in Kansas City, Missouri.

By winning the NWSL Shield and the NWSL Championship, Orlando completed the third double in NWSL history after the North Carolina Courage in 2018 and 2019.

== Road to the final ==
=== Orlando Pride ===
After missing the playoffs on goal difference the previous season, the Orlando Pride opened the 2024 season by going 23 consecutive games without defeat (24 dating back to last season), a league record. Zambian striker Barbra Banda joined the Pride early in the season and led the team in scoring, becoming the NWSL Golden Boot runner-up. Brazilian star Marta found the best form of her recent career and was tied for fourth in the league in goals. They were joined in the NWSL Best XI by NWSL Defender of the Year Emily Sams, who led a defense that allowed the fewest goals in the league. After clinching the NWSL Shield, the club's first major trophy, with a 2–0 win over the Washington Spirit, the Pride dropped two of their last three games of the regular season. They made the playoffs for the first time since 2017, Marta's debut season.

In the playoff quarterfinals, goals scored by Haley McCutcheon, Banda (twice), and Marta powered the Pride to a 4–1 win over the eighth seed Chicago Red Stars at Inter&Co Stadium. Orlando hosted the fourth seed Kansas City Current in the semifinals. Debinha's opening goal for the Current was answered by McCutcheon, Banda, and Marta, who scored Orlando's third goal after making multiple defenders fall. A stoppage-time penalty could not affect a 3–2 victory for the Pride, sending the team to Kansas City for their first NWSL final.

=== Washington Spirit ===
After missing the playoffs by one point the previous season, the Washington Spirit placed second in the 2024 regular-season standings. Head coach Jonatan Giráldez joined the team midseason after an interim stint with Adrián González. Croix Bethune, the NWSL Rookie of the Year and NWSL Midfielder of the Year, tied the league's record for assists in a single season, but missed the end of the season after tearing her meniscus. She was joined in the NWSL Best XI by defender Casey Krueger and winger Trinity Rodman, the team's leading scorer alongside Ouleymata Sarr. The Spirit made the playoffs for the first time since they won the 2021 NWSL Championship.

Washington needed a long-distance strike from defender Tara McKeown to force extra time against Bay FC in the quarterfinals, where an own goal by Caprice Dydasco resulted in the Spirit's 2–1 win at Audi Field. Rookie midfielder Hal Hershfelt scored the 1–1 stoppage-time equalizer against NJ/NY Gotham FC in the semifinals, and goalkeeper Aubrey Kingsbury saved all three penalties she faced in the resulting shootout, as the Spirit to advanced to their third NWSL final.

== Match ==
=== Details ===
November 23, 2024
8:00 pm EST

Orlando Pride	1–0	Washington Spirit
Banda 37'	Report

CPKC Stadium, Kansas City, Missouri
Attendance: 11,500
Referee: Alyssa Nichols

Orlando Pride	Washington Spirit

GK	1	(England) Anna Moorhouse
LB	25	(United States) Kerry Abello	(yellow card) 31'	(substituted off) 86'
CB	3	(United States) Kylie Strom
CB	6	(United States) Emily Sams
RB	31	(United States) Cori Dyke
DM	2	(United States) Haley McCutcheon
DM	15	(Brazil) Angelina		(substituted off) 86'
AM	10	(Brazil) Marta (c)
LW	9	(Brazil) Adriana		(substituted off) 66'
FW	22	(Zambia) Barbra Banda	(yellow card) 70'
RW	11	(United States) Ally Watt		(substituted off) 74'
Substitutes:
GK	40	(United States) McKinley Crone
DF	12	(United States) Carrie Lawrence
DF	13	(Spain) Celia
MF	14	(United States) Viviana Villacorta
MF	16	(United States) Morgan Gautrat		(substituted on) 86'
DF	19	(United States) Carson Pickett		(substituted on) 86'
FW	20	(United States) Julie Doyle		(substituted on) 74'
DF	28	(United States) Summer Yates		(substituted on) 66'
DF	30	(United States) Ally Lemos
Manager:
(England) Seb Hines

GK	1	(United States) Aubrey Kingsbury (c)
LB	3	(United States) Casey Krueger
CB	24	(England) Esme Morgan
CB	9	(United States) Tara McKeown
RB	26	(United States) Paige Metayer	(yellow card) 50'	(substituted off) 61'
CM	10	(Colombia) Leicy Santos
CM	17	(United States) Hal Hershfelt	(yellow card) 42'
AM	8	(United States) Makenna Morris		(substituted off) 73'
LW	19	(Ivory Coast) Rosemonde Kouassi	(yellow card) 28'
FW	33	(United States) Ashley Hatch
RW	2	(United States) Trinity Rodman
Substitutes:
GK	28	(United States) Nicole Barnhart
FW	4	(United States) Lena Silano		(substituted on) 73'
DF	5	(France) Annaïg Butel
DF	6	(United States) Kate Wiesner
FW	13	(United States) Brittany Ratcliffe
DF	14	(Canada) Gabrielle Carle	(yellow card) 90+7'	(substituted on) 61'
MF	16	(United States) Courtney Brown
MF	22	(United States) Heather Stainbrook
FW	39	(United States) Chloe Ricketts
Manager:
(Spain) Jonatan Giráldez

Most Valuable Player:
(Zambia) Barbra Banda

Assistant referees:
Tiffini Turpin (United States)
Brian Marshall (United States)
Fourth official:
Brad Jensen (United States)
Video assistant referee:
Katja Koroleva (United States)

Match rules

- 90 minutes.
- 30 minutes of extra time if necessary.
- Penalty shootout if scores still level.
- Maximum of five substitutions.
