= 2024 Orlando Pride season =

Orlando Pride
2024 season
- Head coach: Seb Hines
- Stadium: Inter&Co Stadium; Orlando, Florida
- NWSL: 1st of 14 (NWSL Shield)
- Playoffs: Champions
- Summer Cup: Group stage
- Top goalscorer: League: Barbra Banda (13); All: Barbra Banda (17)
- Highest home attendance: 17,087 (Sep 28 vs. Houston Dash)
- Lowest home attendance: 5,586 (Mar 29 vs. Chicago Red Stars)
- Average home league attendance: 8,340
Home colors	Away colors

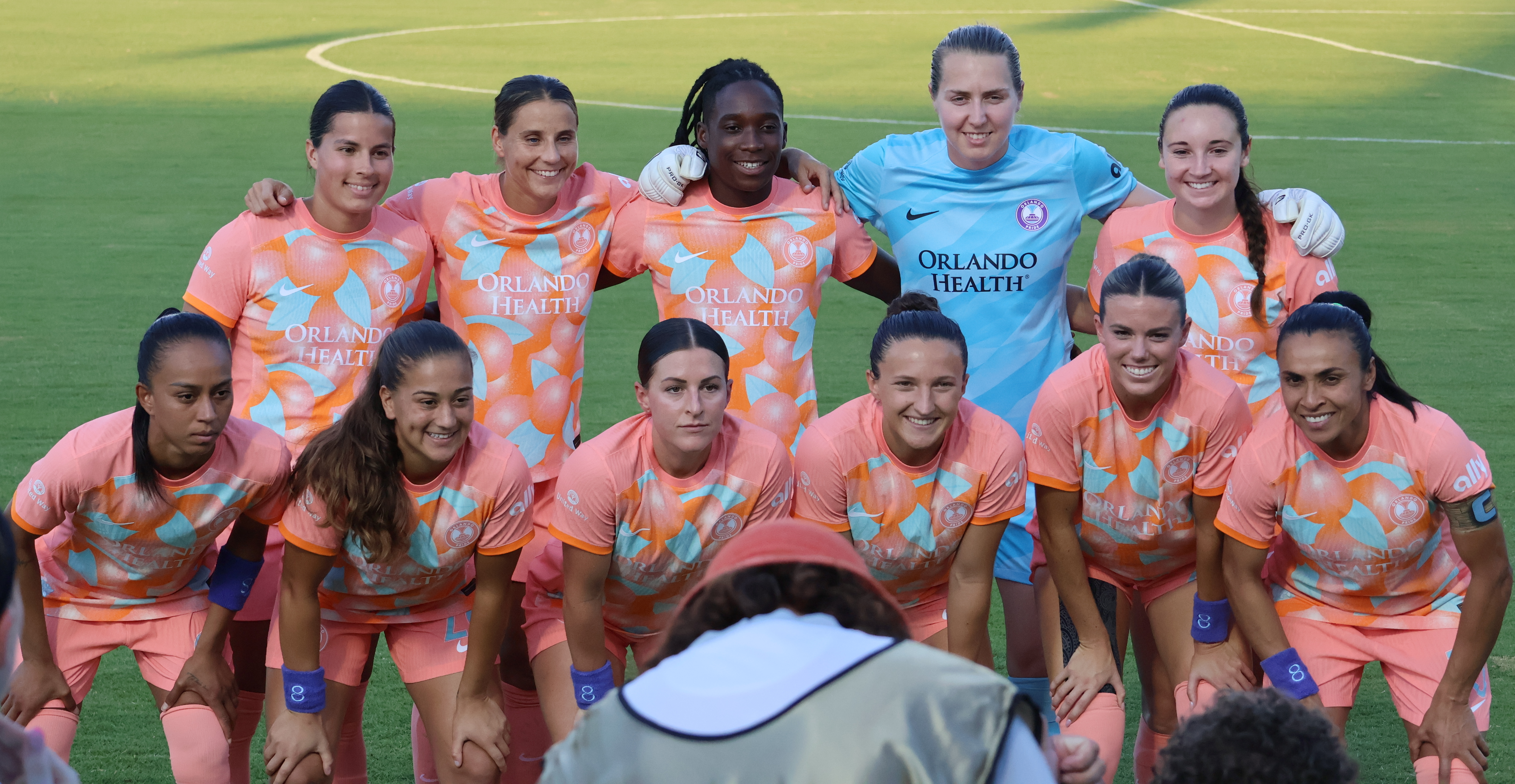
Starting lineup for week 13: Sams, Strom, Banda, Moorhouse, Martínez Adriana, Yates, McCutcheon, Abello, Doyle, Marta

The 2024 Orlando Pride season was the Orlando Pride's ninth season in the National Women's Soccer League, the top division of women's soccer in the United States. The Pride won the NWSL Shield, its first trophy, by finishing the regular season in first place. On November 24, 2024, the Pride defeated the Washington Spirit 1-0 to become NWSL champions for the first time in franchise history.

== Notable events ==
Two new expansion franchises, Bay FC and Utah Royals, joined the NWSL in 2024. Orlando traded for full protection from both teams in the 2024 NWSL Expansion Draft and therefore had no players selected.

After four-and-a-half seasons under the Exploria sponsorship name, Orlando City's home stadium was rebranded as Inter&Co Stadium ahead of the 2024 season.

Ahead of the 2024 season it was announced that after four seasons as a league cup competition, the NWSL Challenge Cup would become a super cup between the previous season's NWSL Shield (regular season) and NWSL Championship (post season) winners. As a result, Orlando Pride did not participate in the 2024 Challenge Cup. It made way for the Summer Cup, a similar style tournament including Liga MX Femenil teams.

On March 7, the team signed Zambian forward Barbra Banda from Shanghai Shengli for a transfer fee reported to be $740,000; a new club record transfer fee and the second-highest in women's soccer history.

The Pride won the NWSL Shield, the team's first trophy, clinching it with a win over Washington Spirit on October 6. They did so while setting several NWSL records, notably going undefeated through the first 23 regular season games until a loss to the Portland Thorns FC on October 11. The streak stretched back to the previous season, lasting 24 NWSL regular seasons games and 27 games in all competitions in total. Goalkeeper Anna Moorhouse also set a new NWSL record for shutouts in a single season with 13, beating Adrianna Franch's 11 shutouts set with Portland Thorns in 2017.

Orlando ended a five-year playoff drought and earned the first postseason victory in club history on November 8 with a 4–1 victory over Chicago Red Stars. The team reached the NWSL Championship game for the first time. It also marked the first time an NWSL Shield winner had reached the Championship since North Carolina Courage in 2019 and similarly the first time since 2019 that the #1 and #2 seeds met in the Championship. On November 23, Orlando became the second club after North Carolina to win the double, defeating Washington 1–0 in the final.

At the end of the season, Emily Sams, Marta and Barbra Banda were named NWSL Best XI first team. Anna Moorhouse and Kerry Abello were named NWSL Best XI second team. Seb Hines was named Coach of the Year.

== Roster ==
As of September 5, 2024.

No.	Nationality	Name	Position(s)	Date of birth (age)	Previous club	Notes
Goalkeepers
1	(England)	Anna Moorhouse	GK	March 30, 1995 (aged 29)	(France) Bordeaux	–
21	(Finland)	Sofia Manner	GK	November 9, 1997 (aged 27)	(Finland) FC Honka	INT
40	(United States)	McKinley Crone	GK	October 20, 1998 (aged 26)	(United States) Alabama Crimson Tide	–
Defenders
2	(United States)	Haley McCutcheon	DF	February 22, 1996 (aged 28)	(United States) Houston Dash	–
3	(United States)	Kylie Strom	DF	March 18, 1992 (aged 32)	(Spain) Atlético Madrid	–
4	(Brazil)	Rafaelle Souza	DF	June 18, 1991 (aged 33)	(England) Arsenal	–
5	(United States)	Megan Montefusco	DF	September 3, 1992 (aged 32)	(United States) Houston Dash	SEI
6	(United States)	Emily Sams	DF	July 1, 1999 (aged 25)	(Sweden) BK Häcken	–
12	(United States)	Carrie Lawrence	DF	July 15, 1997 (aged 27)	(United States) UCF Knights	–
13	(Spain)	Celia	DF	June 20, 1995 (aged 29)	(United States) Seattle Reign FC	–
19	(United States)	Carson Pickett	DF	September 15, 1993 (aged 31)	(United States) Racing Louisville	–
25	(United States)	Kerry Abello	DF	September 17, 1999 (aged 25)	(United States) Penn State Nittany Lions	–
31	(United States)	Cori Dyke	DF	September 20, 2000 (aged 24)	(United States) Penn State Nittany Lions	–
32	(United States)	Brianna Martínez	DF	April 22, 2000 (aged 24)	(United States) Notre Dame Fighting Irish	–
Midfielders
8	(Brazil)	Luana	MF	May 2, 1993 (aged 31)	(Brazil) Corinthians	INT, SEI
14	(United States)	Viviana Villacorta	MF	February 2, 1999 (aged 25)	(United States) UCLA Bruins	–
15	(Brazil)	Angelina	MF	January 26, 2000 (aged 24)	(United States) Seattle Reign FC	–
16	(United States)	Morgan Gautrat	MF	February 26, 1993 (aged 31)	(United States) Kansas City Current	–
17	(Sweden)	Evelina Duljan	MF	May 12, 2003 (aged 21)	(Italy) Juventus	INT
23	(Zambia)	Grace Chanda	MF	June 11, 1997 (aged 27)	(Spain) Madrid CFF	INT, SEI
28	(United States)	Summer Yates	MF	June 17, 2000 (aged 24)	(United States) Washington Huskies	–
30	(United States)	Ally Lemos	MF	March 4, 2004 (aged 20)	(United States) UCLA Bruins	–
Forwards
7	(Argentina)	Mariana Larroquette	FW	October 24, 1992 (aged 32)	(Mexico) Club León	–
9	(Brazil)	Adriana	FW	November 17, 1996 (aged 28)	(Brazil) Corinthians	–
10	(Brazil)	Marta	FW	February 19, 1986 (aged 38)	(Sweden) FC Rosengård	–
11	(United States)	Ally Watt	FW	March 12, 1997 (aged 27)	(United States) Seattle Reign FC	–
18	(United States)	Simone Charley	FW	February 4, 1995 (aged 29)	(United States) Angel City FC	SEI
20	(United States)	Julie Doyle	FW	August 30, 1998 (aged 26)	(United States) Santa Clara Broncos	–
22	(Zambia)	Barbra Banda	FW	March 20, 2000 (aged 24)	(China) Shanghai Shengli	INT

== Staff ==
As of March 3, 2023.

Executive
Majority owner and chairman	(United States) Mark Wilf
Majority owner and vice-chair	(United States) Zygi Wilf
Majority owner and vice-chair	(United States) Leonard Wilf
President of business operations	(United States) Jarrod Dillon
General manager	(United States) Haley Carter
Coaching staff
Head coach	(England) Seb Hines
Assistant coach	(Jamaica) Giles Barnes
Assistant coach	(Sweden) Yolanda Thomas
Goalkeeper coach	(England) Paul Crichton
Director of medical & performance	(United States) Cory Price
Strength and conditioning coach	(United States) Christi Edson

== Match results ==
=== Friendlies ===
Orlando Pride opened preseason camp on January 23. Six friendly matches were scheduled with all played behind closed doors.

February 15	Orlando Pride	–	North Carolina Courage
Note: Closed-door scrimmage. No scoreline announced.

February 18	Orlando Pride	–	UCF Knights
Note: Closed-door scrimmage. No scoreline announced.

February 24	Orlando Pride	–	Kansas City Current
Note: Closed-door scrimmage. No scoreline announced.

March 2	Orlando Pride	–	Florida State Seminoles
Note: Closed-door scrimmage. No scoreline announced.

March 3	Orlando Pride	–	Florida Gators
Note: Closed-door scrimmage. No scoreline announced.

March 8	Orlando Pride	–	Washington Spirit
Note: Closed-door scrimmage. No scoreline announced.

=== National Women's Soccer League ===
The NWSL regular season was played on a balanced schedule i.e. each team will play every other team twice; once at home and once away. The top eight teams qualified for the playoffs, an increase of two from the previous year.

Results summary

Overall								Home						Away					
Pld	W	D	L	GF	GA	GD	Pts	W	D	L	GF	GA	GD	W	D	L	GF	GA	GD
26	18	6	2	46	20	+26	60	10	3	0	27	7	+20	8	3	2	19	13	+6

Last updated: November 2, 2024.
Source: NWSLsoccer.com

==== Results by round ====
Round	1	2	3	4	5	6	7	8	9	10	11	12	13	14	15	16	17	18	19	20	21	22	23	24	25	26
Stadium	A	H	H	A	H	A	H	H	H	A	H	A	A	H	A	A	A	H	A	H	A	H	H	A	A	H
Result	D	D	D	W	W	W	W	W	W	W	W	D	D	W	W	W	W	W	W	D	W	W	W	L	L	W
Position (Note: ORL's position at the end of the matchweek, not their match.)	6	9	8	5	5	4	3	1	2	1	1	2	2	2	2	1	1	1	1	1	1	1	1	1	1	1

Updated to match(es) played on November 2, 2024. Source: NWSLsoccer.com
A = Away; H = Home; W = Win; D = Draw; L = Loss

==== Results ====
March 16 1	Racing Louisville	2–2	Orlando Pride	Louisville, Kentucky
4:00 pm	Flint (yellow card) 3'; Bahr 13'; Kanu 19'; DeMelo (yellow card) 37'; Howell (yellow card) 68'; Fischer (yellow card) 79'	Report	Strom (yellow card) 15' (yellow-red card) 62'; Pikkujämsä 24' (o.g.); Luana (yellow card) 43'; Yates 86'	Stadium: Lynn Family Stadium; Attendance: 6,123; Referee: Laura Rodriguez

March 22 2	Orlando Pride	1–1	Angel City FC	Orlando, Florida
8:00 pm	Gautrat (yellow card) 10'; Marta (yellow card) 71', (goal) 88'	Report	Emslie 53' (pen.); Henry (yellow card) 90+6'	Stadium: Inter&Co Stadium; Attendance: 6,306; Referee: Alex Billeter

March 29 3	Orlando Pride	1–1	Chicago Red Stars	Orlando, Florida
7:00 pm	Malham 21' (o.g.); Martínez (yellow card) 45+1'; Luana (yellow card) 71'; Strom (yellow card) 76'; Marta (yellow card) 90'	Report	Roccaro (yellow card) 36'; Bianchi (yellow card) 42'; Swanson 64'; Staab (yellow card) 90+5'	Stadium: Inter&Co Stadium; Attendance: 5,586; Referee: Anya Voigt

April 12 4	Utah Royals	0–1	Orlando Pride	Sandy, Utah
9:30 pm	Pogarch (yellow card) 26'	Report	Marta 68'; Abello (yellow card) 71'; McCutcheon (yellow card) 90+9'	Stadium: America First Field; Attendance: 8,578; Referee: Thomas Snyder

April 19 5	Orlando Pride	1–0	San Diego Wave	Orlando, Florida
8:00 pm	Yates 26'	Report	McCaskill (yellow card) 68'; Wesley (yellow card) 85'	Stadium: Inter&Co Stadium; Attendance: 7,701; Referee: Sergii Demianchuk

April 26 6	Washington Spirit	2–3	Orlando Pride	Buzzard Point, Washington D.C.
7:30 pm	Sarr 40'; Sullivan (yellow card) 45+5'; Hatch 65'	Report	Angelina 22'; Banda 51'; Yates 57' (pen.); Martínez (yellow card) 71' (yellow-red card) 90'; Lawrence (yellow card) 89'	Stadium: Audi Field; Attendance: 11,636; Referee: Rebecca Pagan

May 1 7	Orlando Pride	4–1	North Carolina Courage	Orlando, Florida
7:00 pm	Watt 29'; Banda 40', 77'; Doyle 45+2'	Report	Sams 52' (o.g.); Pickett (yellow card) 59'	Stadium: Inter&Co Stadium; Attendance: 4,702; Referee: Natalie Simon

May 5 8	Orlando Pride	1–0	Racing Louisville	Orlando, Florida
6:00 pm	Banda 17'; Abello (yellow card) 26'; Gautrat (yellow card) 90+3'	Report	Fischer (yellow card) 39'	Stadium: Inter&Co Stadium; Attendance: 6,837; Referee: Alyssa Nichols

May 11 9	Orlando Pride	1–0	Bay FC	Orlando, Florida
7:30 pm	Sams (yellow card) 7'; Adriana 32' (pen.); Rafaelle (yellow card) 52'	Report	Malonson (yellow card) 6'; Kundananji (yellow card) 67'; Camberos (yellow card) 79'	Stadium: Inter&Co Stadium; Attendance: 7,707; Referee: Danielle Chesky

May 19 10	Seattle Reign	2–3	Orlando Pride	Seattle, Washington
6:00 pm	James-Turner 45+5'; Balcer 48', (yellow card) 45+1' (yellow-red card) 83'; Cook (yellow card) 76'	Report	Sams 9'; Banda 18', 58'; Doyle (yellow card) 90+4'; Allen (yellow card) 90+8'	Stadium: Lumen Field; Attendance: 6,781; Referee: Elijio Arreguin

May 24 11	Orlando Pride	2–1	Portland Thorns	Orlando, Florida
7:00 pm	Banda 30', 40'; Lemos (yellow card) 90'	Report	Hubly (yellow card) 9'; D'Aquila 71'; Linnehan (yellow card) 90+6'	Stadium: Inter&Co Stadium; Attendance: 9,226; Referee: Katja Koroleva

June 7 12	San Diego Wave	1–1	Orlando Pride	San Diego, California
10:00 pm	Girma (yellow card) 17'; Doniak 62'; Carusa (yellow card) 85'; van Egmond (yellow card) 87'	Report	Doyle 36'	Stadium: Snapdragon Stadium; Attendance: 17,073; Referee: Nabil Bensalah

June 15 13	North Carolina Courage	0–0	Orlando Pride	Cary, North Carolina
7:30 pm	Lussi (yellow card) 16'; Kurtz (yellow card) 49'	Report	Watt (yellow card) 86'	Stadium: WakeMed Soccer Park; Attendance: 4,776; Referee: JC Griggs

June 21 14	Orlando Pride	6–0	Utah Royals	Orlando, Florida
8:00 pm	Banda 27', 86'; Yates 45+3'; Marta 47', 88'; Watt 90+5'	Report	Tejada (yellow card) 45+6'	Stadium: Inter&Co Stadium; Attendance: 9,656; Referee: Alyssa Nichols

June 30 15	Angel City FC	0–3	Orlando Pride	Los Angeles, California
7:30 pm	Haračić (yellow card) 66'; Hammond (yellow card) 77'; Dougherty Howard (yellow card) 83'	Report	Adriana 20', 26'; Sams (yellow card) 75'; Banda 90+6'	Stadium: BMO Stadium; Attendance: 22,000; Referee: Elijio Arreguin

July 6 16	Kansas City Current	1–2	Orlando Pride	Kansas City, Missouri
7:30 pm	Hutton (yellow card) 28'; Chawinga 39'; LaBonta (yellow card) 47'; Mace (yellow card) 57'; Franch (yellow card) 61'	Report	Lawrence (yellow card) 14' (yellow-red card) 42'; Marta (yellow card) 23', (goal) 63' (pen.); Banda 37'	Stadium: CPKC Stadium; Attendance: 11,500; Referee: Joshua Encarnación

August 23 17	Houston Dash	0–1	Orlando Pride	Houston, Texas
8:00 pm		Report	Doyle (yellow card) 31'; McCutcheon (yellow card) 52'; Yates 67'	Stadium: Shell Energy Stadium; Attendance: 6,514; Referee: Alex Billeter

September 1 18	Orlando Pride	2–0	Gotham FC	Orlando, Florida
6:00 pm	Adriana 6', 19'; Pickett (yellow card) 90'	Report	Sonnett (yellow card) 5'; Davidson (yellow card) 26'; Bruninha (yellow card) 80'	Stadium: Inter&Co Stadium; Attendance: 8,726; Referee: Thomas Snyder

September 8 19	Chicago Red Stars	0–1	Orlando Pride	Bridgeview, Illinois
6:00 pm	Bike (yellow card) 49'; Anderson (yellow card) 62'; Franklin (yellow card) 85'	Report	Strom (yellow card) 15'; Marta 37'; Gautrat (yellow card) 90+3'	Stadium: SeatGeek Stadium; Attendance: 7,291; Referee: Eric Tattersall

September 13 20	Orlando Pride	0–0	Kansas City Current	Orlando, Florida
7:00 pm		Report		Stadium: Inter&Co Stadium; Attendance: 9,396; Referee: Alyssa Nichols

September 20 21	Bay FC	0–1	Orlando Pride	San Jose, California
10:30 pm	Moreau (yellow card) 76'	Report	Banda 84'	Stadium: PayPal Park; Attendance: 11,063; Referee: Brad Jensen

September 28 22	Orlando Pride	3–1	Houston Dash	Orlando, Florida
7:30 pm	Pickett 29'; Angelina 51', (yellow card) 90+4'; Marta 90+2'	Report	Nagasato 53'	Stadium: Inter&Co Stadium; Attendance: 17,087; Referee: Iryna Petrunok

October 6 23	Orlando Pride	2–0	Washington Spirit	Orlando, Florida
5:00 pm	Marta 56' (pen.); McKeown 73' (o.g.)	Report	Butel (yellow card) 3'; Stainbrook (yellow card) 39'; McKeown (yellow card) 54'	Stadium: Inter&Co Stadium; Attendance: 7,729; Referee: Danielle Chesky

October 11 24	Portland Thorns	2–0	Orlando Pride	Portland, Oregon
10:00 pm	Weaver 12'; Sinclair 55'; Reyes (yellow card) 82'; Müller (yellow card) 85'	Report	Pickett (yellow card) 22'	Stadium: Providence Park; Referee: JC Griggs

October 20 25	Gotham FC	3–1	Orlando Pride	Harrison, New Jersey
5:00 pm	Hiatt 13'; Lavelle 45+1'; Stevens 49'; Nighswonger (yellow card) 54'; Martin (yellow card) 88'	Report	Adriana 31' (pen.)	Stadium: Red Bull Arena; Attendance: 20,039; Referee: Ricardo Fierro

November 2 26	Orlando Pride	3–2	Seattle Reign	Orlando, Florida
5:00 pm	Watt 9'; Abello 25'; Marta (yellow card) 45+4', (goal) 57'	Report	Huitema 10'; Mercado 84'	Stadium: Inter&Co Stadium; Attendance: 7,765; Referee: Melinda Sopka Homa

==== League standings ====
Pos	Team	Pld	W	D	L	GF	GA	GD	Pts	Qualification
1	Orlando Pride (C, S)	26	18	6	2	46	20	+26	60	NWSL Shield, playoffs, and CONCACAF W Champions Cup
2	Washington Spirit	26	18	2	6	51	28	+23	56	Playoffs, and CONCACAF W Champions Cup
3	NJ/NY Gotham FC	26	17	5	4	41	20	+21	56	Playoffs, and CONCACAF W Champions Cup (Note: With Orlando Pride winning both the 2024 National Women's Soccer League Championship and 2024 National Women's Soccer League Shield, the third qualifying spot for the United States went to the next best club in 2024 National Women's Soccer League Shield standings not already qualified, Gotham FC.)
4	Kansas City Current	26	16	7	3	57	31	+26	55	Playoffs
5	North Carolina Courage	26	12	3	11	34	28	+6	39	Playoffs

Source: NWSL
Rules for classification: Tiebreakers
(C) Champions and W Champions Cup; (S) NWSL Shield

=== Playoffs ===
The top eight teams qualified for the playoffs. All rounds were single elimination. Orlando qualified for the first time since 2017 and entered as the #1 seed, matching them at home to the #8 seed in the quarterfinals.

November 8 Quarter-final	#1 Orlando Pride	4–1	#8 Chicago Red Stars	Orlando, Florida
8:00 pm	McCutcheon 26'; Banda 39', 45+6'; Marta 56' (pen.); Doyle (yellow card) 59'; Dyke (yellow card) 67'	Report	Joseph 60'	Stadium: Inter&Co Stadium; Attendance: 11,496; Referee: Alyssa Nichols

November 17 Semi-final	#1 Orlando Pride	3–2	#4 Kansas City Current	Orlando, Florida
3:00 pm	Angelina (yellow card) 28'; McCutcheon 41', (yellow card) 90+13'; Banda 53'; Moorhouse (yellow card) 81'; Marta 82'	Report	Debinha 33'; Mace (yellow card) 55'; Sharples (yellow card) 90+9'; DiBernardo 90+13' (pen.)	Stadium: Inter&Co Stadium; Attendance: 14,524; Referee: Danielle Chesky

November 23 Final	#1 Orlando Pride	1–0	#2 Washington Spirit	Kansas City, Missouri
8:00 pm	Abello (yellow card) 31'; Banda 37', (yellow card) 70'	Report	Kouassi (yellow card) 28'; Hershfelt (yellow card) 42'; Metayer (yellow card) 50'; Carle (yellow card) 90+7'	Stadium: CPKC Stadium; Attendance: 11,500; Referee: Alyssa Nichols

=== NWSL x Liga MX Femenil Summer Cup ===
In 2024, NWSL and Liga MX Femenil combined for a new tournament, the Summer Cup. All 14 NWSL clubs and six Liga MX clubs competed in a group stage before a knockout round.

Group stage

July 20 Group stage	North Carolina Courage	1–1 (5–4 p)	Orlando Pride	Cary, North Carolina
7:30 pm	Matsukubo 44'	Report	Celia (yellow card) 62', (goal) 82'	Stadium: WakeMed Soccer Park; Attendance: 2,800; Referee: Lorenzo Hernandez
	Penalties
	Jackson (penalty missed); Kurtz (penalty scored); Wingate (penalty scored); Berkely (penalty scored); Pinto (penalty scored); Weatherholt (penalty missed); Miura (penalty scored)		(penalty scored) Larroquette; (penalty scored) Lemos; (penalty scored) Watt; (penalty scored) Strom; (penalty missed) Celia; (penalty missed) McCutcheon; (penalty missed) Duljan

July 27 Group stage	Orlando Pride	2–2 (5–4 p)	(Mexico) Monterrey	Orlando, Florida
7:00 pm	Kerr 50'; Doyle 83'	Report	Burkenroad 43'; R. Bernal 61', (yellow card) 89'	Stadium: Inter&Co Stadium; Referee: Shawn Tehini
	Penalties
	Doyle (penalty scored); Lemos (penalty scored); Yates (penalty scored); Dyke (penalty scored); Kerr (penalty scored)		(penalty scored) R. Bernal; (penalty scored) García; (penalty missed) van Dongen; (penalty scored) K. Martínez; (penalty scored) Evangelista

August 1 Group stage	Orlando Pride	1–1 (3–4 p)	Racing Louisville	Orlando, Florida
7:00 pm	Duljan 38'; Celia (yellow card) 60'; Winter (yellow card) 90+9'	Report	Turner 67'; Sears (yellow card) 84'	Stadium: Inter&Co Stadium; Referee: Alejo Calume
	Penalties
	Larroquette (penalty scored); Lemos (penalty scored); Doyle (penalty scored); Gautrat (penalty missed); Watt (penalty missed)		(penalty missed) Howell; (penalty scored) Sears; (penalty scored) DiGrande; (penalty scored) Milliet; (penalty scored) Flint

Pos	Team	Pld	W	PW	PL	L	GF	GA	GD	Pts	Qualification	NC	LOU	ORL	MON
1	(United States Soccer Federation) North Carolina Courage	3	1	2	0	0	5	2	+3	7	Advances to knockout stage	—	1–1	1–1	3–0
2	(United States Soccer Federation) Racing Louisville FC	3	1	1	1	0	5	3	+2	6		1–1	—	1–1	3–1
3	(United States Soccer Federation) Orlando Pride	3	0	1	2	0	4	4	0	4		1–1	1–1	—	2–2
4	(Mexican Football Federation) Monterrey	3	0	0	1	2	3	8	−5	1		0–3	1–3	2–2	—

Source: NWSL
Rules for classification: tiebreakers

== Squad statistics ==
=== Appearances ===
As of match played November 23, 2024

Starting appearances are listed first, followed by substitute appearances after the + symbol where applicable.

No.	Pos	Nat	Player	Total		NWSL		Playoffs		Summer Cup	
No.	Pos	Nat	Player	Apps	Goals	Apps	Goals	Apps	Goals	Apps	Goals
Goalkeepers
1	GK	(England) ENG	Anna Moorhouse	30	0	26	0	3	0	1	0
21	GK	(Finland) FIN	Sofia Manner	1	0	0	0	0	0	1	0
40	GK	(United States) USA	McKinley Crone	1	0	0	0	0	0	1	0
Defenders
2	DF	(United States) USA	Haley McCutcheon	27	2	18+4	0	3	2	2	0
3	DF	(United States) USA	Kylie Strom	31	0	24+1	0	3	0	3	0
4	DF	(Brazil) BRA	Rafaelle Souza	9	0	6+3	0	0	0	0	0
5	DF	(United States) USA	Megan Montefusco	0	0	0	0	0	0	0	0
6	DF	(United States) USA	Emily Sams	28	1	24+1	1	3	0	0	0
12	DF	(United States) USA	Carrie Lawrence	11	0	3+6	0	0	0	2	0
13	DF	(Spain) ESP	Celia	7	1	1+2	0	0+1	0	3	1
19	DF	(United States) USA	Carson Pickett	10	1	4+3	1	0+3	0	0	0
25	DF	(United States) USA	Kerry Abello	31	1	25+1	1	3	0	1+1	0
31	DF	(United States) USA	Cori Dyke	26	0	11+10	0	3	0	2	0
32	DF	(United States) USA	Brianna Martínez	14	0	8+5	0	0	0	1	0
Midfielders
8	MF	(Brazil) BRA	Luana	3	0	2+1	0	0	0	0	0
14	MF	(United States) USA	Viviana Villacorta	4	0	1+2	0	0+1	0	0	0
15	MF	(Brazil) BRA	Angelina	24	2	16+5	2	3	0	0	0
16	MF	(United States) USA	Morgan Gautrat	22	0	11+6	0	0+2	0	2+1	0
17	MF	(Sweden) SWE	Evelina Duljan	11	1	1+7	0	0	0	2+1	1
23	MF	(Zambia) ZAM	Grace Chanda	0	0	0	0	0	0	0	0
28	MF	(United States) USA	Summer Yates	31	5	17+8	5	1+2	0	2+1	0
30	MF	(United States) USA	Ally Lemos	16	0	2+11	0	0	0	2+1	0
Forwards
7	FW	(Argentina) ARG	Mariana Larroquette	7	0	0+4	0	0	0	1+2	0
9	FW	(Brazil) BRA	Adriana	26	6	19+4	6	2+1	0	0	0
10	FW	(Brazil) BRA	Marta	26	11	19+4	9	3	2	0	0
11	FW	(United States) USA	Ally Watt	28	3	9+13	3	3	0	2+1	0
18	FW	(United States) USA	Simone Charley	0	0	0	0	0	0	0	0
20	FW	(United States) USA	Julie Doyle	30	3	19+5	2	0+3	0	2+1	1
22	FW	(Zambia) ZAM	Barbra Banda	25	17	20+2	13	3	4	0	0
Players away from the club on loan:
29	FW	(Canada) CAN	Amanda Allen	11	0	0+8	0	0	0	1+2	0
Players who appeared for the club but left during the season:
33	FW	(United States) USA	Alex Kerr	4	1	0+1	0	0	0	2+1	1
36	MF	(United States) USA	Claire Winter	2	0	0	0	0	0	0+2	0

=== Goalscorers ===
As of match played November 23, 2024

Rank	No.	Pos.	Name	NWSL	Playoffs	Summer Cup	Total
1	22	FW	(Zambia) Barbra Banda	13	4	0	17
2	10	FW	(Brazil) Marta	9	2	0	11
3	9	FW	(Brazil) Adriana	6	0	0	6
4	28	MF	(United States) Summer Yates	5	0	0	5
5	11	FW	(United States) Ally Watt	3	0	0	3
5	20	FW	(United States) Julie Doyle	2	0	1	3
7	2	DF	(United States) Haley McCutcheon	0	2	0	2
7	15	MF	(Brazil) Angelina	2	0	0	2
9	6	DF	(United States) Emily Sams	1	0	0	1
9	13	DF	(Spain) Celia	0	0	1	1
9	17	MF	(Sweden) Evelina Duljan	0	0	1	1
9	19	DF	(United States) Carson Pickett	1	0	0	1
9	25	DF	(United States) Kerry Abello	1	0	0	1
9	33	FW	(United States) Alex Kerr	0	0	1	1
Own goals				3	0	0	3
Total				46	8	4	58

=== Shutouts ===
As of match played November 23, 2024

Rank	No.	Pos.	Name	NWSL	Playoffs	Summer Cup	Total
1	1	GK	(England) Anna Moorhouse	13	1	0	14
Total				13	1	0	14

=== Disciplinary record ===
As of match played November 23, 2024

No.	Pos.	Name	NWSL			Playoffs			Summer Cup			Total		
No.	Pos.	Name	Booked	(yellow card) (yellow-red card)	Sent off (straight red)	Booked	(yellow card) (yellow-red card)	Sent off (straight red)	Booked	(yellow card) (yellow-red card)	Sent off (straight red)	Booked	(yellow card) (yellow-red card)	Sent off (straight red)
1	GK	(England) Anna Moorhouse	0	0	0	1	0	0	0	0	0	1	0	0
2	DF	(United States) Haley McCutcheon	2	0	0	1	0	0	0	0	0	3	0	0
3	DF	(United States) Kylie Strom	2	1	0	0	0	0	0	0	0	2	1	0
4	DF	(Brazil) Rafaelle Souza	1	0	0	0	0	0	0	0	0	1	0	0
6	DF	(United States) Emily Sams	2	0	0	0	0	0	0	0	0	2	0	0
8	MF	(Brazil) Luana	2	0	0	0	0	0	0	0	0	2	0	0
10	FW	(Brazil) Marta	4	0	0	0	0	0	0	0	0	4	0	0
11	FW	(United States) Ally Watt	1	0	0	0	0	0	0	0	0	1	0	0
12	DF	(United States) Carrie Lawrence	1	1	0	0	0	0	0	0	0	1	1	0
13	DF	(Spain) Celia	0	0	0	0	0	0	2	0	0	2	0	0
15	MF	(Brazil) Angelina	1	0	0	1	0	0	0	0	0	2	0	0
16	MF	(United States) Morgan Gautrat	3	0	0	0	0	0	0	0	0	3	0	0
19	DF	(United States) Carson Pickett	3	0	0	0	0	0	0	0	0	3	0	0
20	FW	(United States) Julie Doyle	2	0	0	1	0	0	0	0	0	3	0	0
22	FW	(Zambia) Barbra Banda	0	0	0	1	0	0	0	0	0	1	0	0
25	DF	(United States) Kerry Abello	2	0	0	1	0	0	0	0	0	3	0	0
29	FW	(Canada) Amanda Allen	1	0	0	0	0	0	0	0	0	1	0	0
30	MF	(United States) Ally Lemos	1	0	0	0	0	0	0	0	0	1	0	0
31	DF	(United States) Cori Dyke	0	0	0	1	0	0	0	0	0	1	0	0
32	DF	(United States) Brianna Martínez	1	1	0	0	0	0	0	0	0	1	1	0
36	MF	(United States) Claire Winter	0	0	0	0	0	0	1	0	0	1	0	0
Total			29	3	0	7	0	0	3	0	0	39	3	0

== Transfers and loans ==
=== 2024 NWSL Draft ===
Draft picks are not automatically signed to the team roster. The 2024 college draft was held on January 12, 2024. Orlando made four selections.

Round	Pick	Player	Pos.	College	Status
1	9	(United States) Ally Lemos	MF	University of California, Los Angeles	Signed
2	22	(United States) Cori Dyke	DF	Pennsylvania State University	Signed
4	50	(United States) Alex Kerr	FW	Texas Tech University	Signed
4	56	(United States) Talia Gabarra	MF	University of Central Florida	Not signed

=== Transfers in ===
Date	Player	Pos.	Previous club	Fee/notes	Ref.
December 1, 2023	(Finland) Sofia Manner	GK	(Finland) FC Honka	Undisclosed fee.	
December 13, 2023	(Brazil) Angelina	MF	(United States) Seattle Reign	Free agent signing.	
December 14, 2023	(Brazil) Luana	MF	(Brazil) Corinthians		
January 2, 2024	(Sweden) Evelina Duljan	MF	(Italy) Juventus	Free agent signing.	
January 11, 2024	(United States) Morgan Gautrat	MF	(United States) Kansas City Current	Acquired with $50,000 in allocation money in exchange for a 2024 international roster spot.	
January 24, 2024	(United States) Simone Charley	FW	(United States) Angel City FC	Free agent signing.	
March 7, 2024	(Zambia) Barbra Banda	FW	(China) Shanghai Shengli	Undisclosed fee. Reportedly $740,000.	
May 30, 2024	(Zambia) Grace Chanda	MF	(Spain) Madrid CFF	Free agent signing.	
July 18, 2024	(United States) Kenna Caldwell	GK	(United States) Texas A&M Aggies	National Team Replacement contract.	
July 18, 2024	(United States) Claire Winter	MF	(Denmark) FC Thy-Thisted Q	National Team Replacement contract.	
August 16, 2024	(United States) Carson Pickett	DF	(United States) Racing Louisville	Acquired in exchange for $75,000 in allocation money.	

=== Transfers out ===
Date	Player	Pos.	Destination club	Fee/notes	Ref.
November 15, 2023	(United States) Mikayla Cluff	MF	(United States) Utah Royals	Traded with the No. 26 overall selection in the 2024 NWSL Draft in exchange for $90,000 in allocation money and 2024 NWSL Expansion Draft protection.	
November 20, 2023	(Brazil) Thais Reiss	MF	(Spain) Villarreal	Option declined	
November 20, 2023	(United States) Caitlin Cosme	DF	(Iceland) Stjarnan	Out of contract	
November 20, 2023	(Canada) Jordyn Listro	MF	(United States) Tampa Bay Sun	Out of contract	
December 12, 2023	(United States) Carly Nelson	GK	(United States) Utah Royals	Traded with $65,000 in allocation money in exchange for a 2024 international roster spot	
January 16, 2024	(United States) Erika Tymrak	MF	(United States) Tampa Bay Sun	Mutually terminated contract	
January 26, 2024	(United States) Messiah Bright	FW	(United States) Angel City FC	Traded in exchange for $130,000 in allocation money.	
April 16, 2024	(United States) Kaylie Collins	GK	(United States) Seattle Reign	Waived	
April 16, 2024	(United States) Tori Hansen	DF	(United States) Brooklyn FC	Waived	
August 28, 2024	(United States) Alex Kerr	FW	(Italy) Como	Waived	
August 3, 2024	(United States) Kenna Caldwell	GK		End of National Team Replacement contract.	
August 3, 2024	(United States) Claire Winter	MF	(United States) Lexington SC	End of National Team Replacement contract.	

=== Loans out ===
Date	Player	Pos.	Loaned to	Notes	Ref.
September 5, 2024	(Canada) Amanda Allen	FW	(United States) Lexington SC	Until May 2025; terminated on December 9, 2024, and placed on SEI list	

=== Preseason trialists ===
Orlando Pride began preseason training on January 23, 2024. The squad included four non-roster invitees on trial with the team during preseason. McKinley Crone returned to Orlando having played with the Pride during the previous season before her contract expired while five-year NWSL veteran Simone Charley was a free agent having been with Angel City FC for the last two seasons. Two undrafted rookies were also included: goalkeeper Kenna Caldwell out of Texas A&M University and defender Raegan Cox out of Michigan State University. Emily Moxley also trained with the team in preseason.

2024 Orlando Pride trialists
Player	Position	Previous team
(United States) McKinley Crone	GK	(United States) Orlando Pride
(United States) Simone Charley	FW	(United States) Angel City FC
(United States) Kenna Caldwell	GK	(United States) Texas A&M Aggies
(United States) Raegan Cox	DF	(United States) Michigan State Spartans
(United States) Emily Moxley	DF	(United States) North Carolina Tar Heels

Signed to first team contract.
Signed to National Team Replacement contract.
