= Alex Kerr (soccer) =

American soccer player (born 2001)

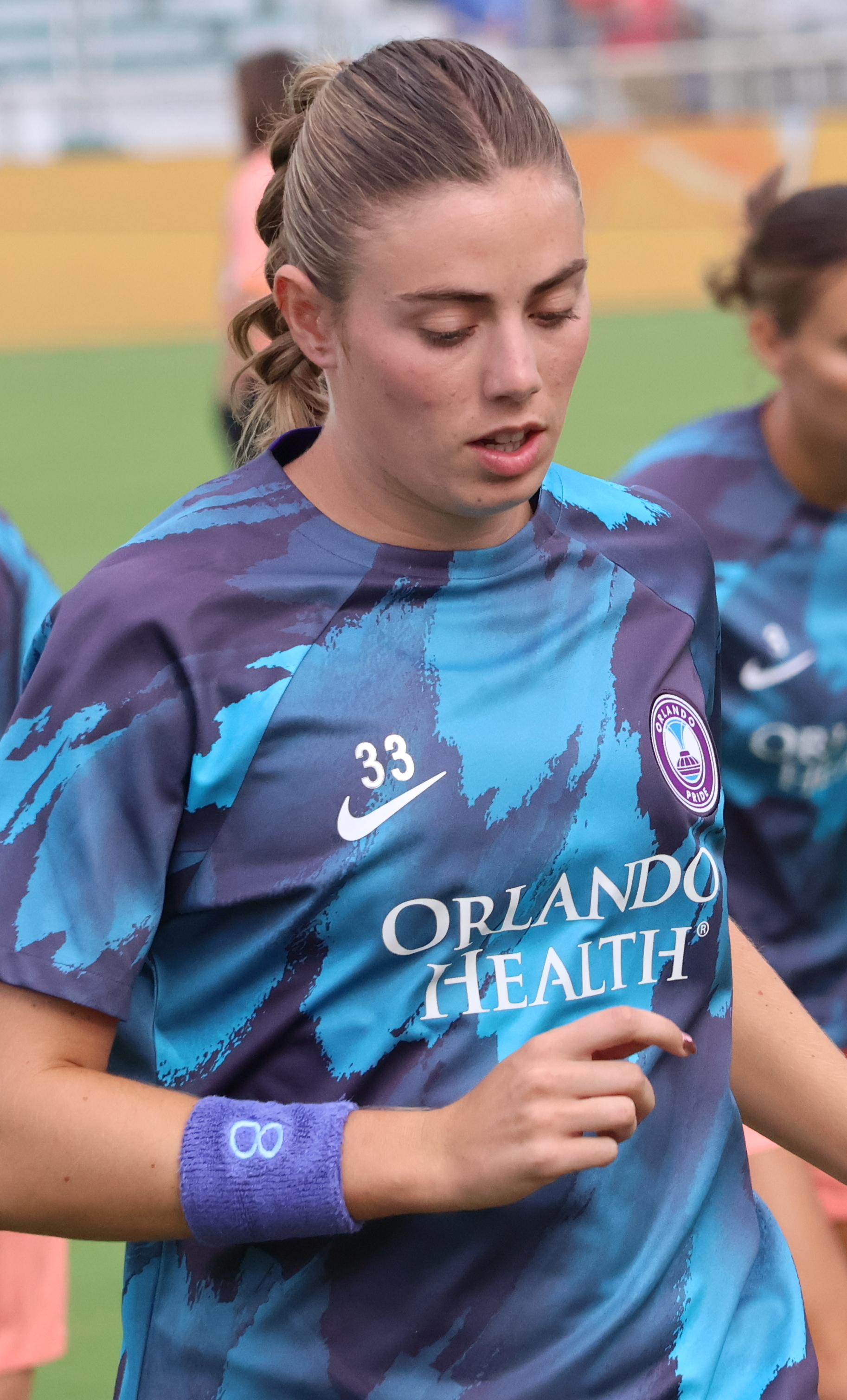
- Kerr with the Orlando Pride in 2024

Personal information
- Full name: Alexandra Catherine Kerr
- Date of birth: July 23, 2001 (age 25)
- Place of birth: Boston, Massachusetts, U.S.
- Height: 5 ft 10 in (1.78 m)
- Position: Striker

Team information
- Current team: Porto
- Number: 9

Youth career
- North Carolina Courage
- 2016–2019: Chapel Hill Tigers

College career
Years	Team	Apps	(Gls)
2019–2022	Vanderbilt Commodores	63	(12)
2023	Texas Tech Red Raiders	23	(11)

Senior career*
Years	Team	Apps	(Gls)
2024	Orlando Pride	1	(0)
2024–2026	Como	31	(7)
2026	Parma	11	(0)
2026–	Porto	6	(1)
- * Club domestic league appearances and goals as of November 22, 2026

Alexandra Catherine Kerr (born July 23, 2001) is an American professional soccer player who plays as a striker for Campeonato Nacional Feminino club Porto. She played college soccer for the Vanderbilt Commodores and Texas Tech Red Raiders and was drafted by the Orlando Pride in the fourth round of the 2024 NWSL Draft. She also previously played for Italian clubs Como and Parma.

== Early life ==
Born in Boston, Massachusetts, Kerr was raised in Chapel Hill, North Carolina. She played multiple sports growing up, including basketball and tennis, before deciding to focus on soccer while at Chapel Hill High School. She set a single-season school record with 44 goals as a sophomore and scored 42 goals as a senior in 2019. She earned all-conference, all-state, and all-region honors and was the conference player of the year in 2019. She played DA club soccer for the NC Courage, where she led the team with 16 goals in 2018. She committed to play college soccer for the Vanderbilt Commodores over offers from Princeton, USC, and Virginia.

== College career ==
=== Vanderbilt Commodores ===
Kerr played in 14 games and scored 2 goals for the Vanderbilt Commodores as a freshman in 2019. She played in 12 games, making 5 starts, as a sophomore in 2020, helping the Commodores win the SEC tournament in the COVID-19 pandemic-shortened season. In her junior year in 2021, she scored 4 goals in 16 games. She became a regular starter in her senior season in 2022, scoring 6 goals in 21 games (ranked second on the team in scoring).

=== Texas Tech Red Raiders ===
After four years in Nashville, Kerr entered the transfer portal and joined the Texas Tech Red Raiders for her graduate season in 2023. Head coach Tom Stone, her father's college teammate, had known her since she was young and said he "had to fight off half the SEC" to sign her. Kerr and junior Ashleigh Williams were central to the Red Raider offense throughout the season, helping win the Big 12 Conference regular-season title for the first time in program history. In the NCAA tournament, she scored the winning goal against Florida Gulf Coast in the first round. In the second round, she converted her penalty kick as the Red Raiders advanced past Princeton before losing to North Carolina in the third round. She finished the season with career-high 11 goals and 5 assists in 23 games, earning second-team All-Big 12 honors.

== Club career ==
=== Orlando Pride ===
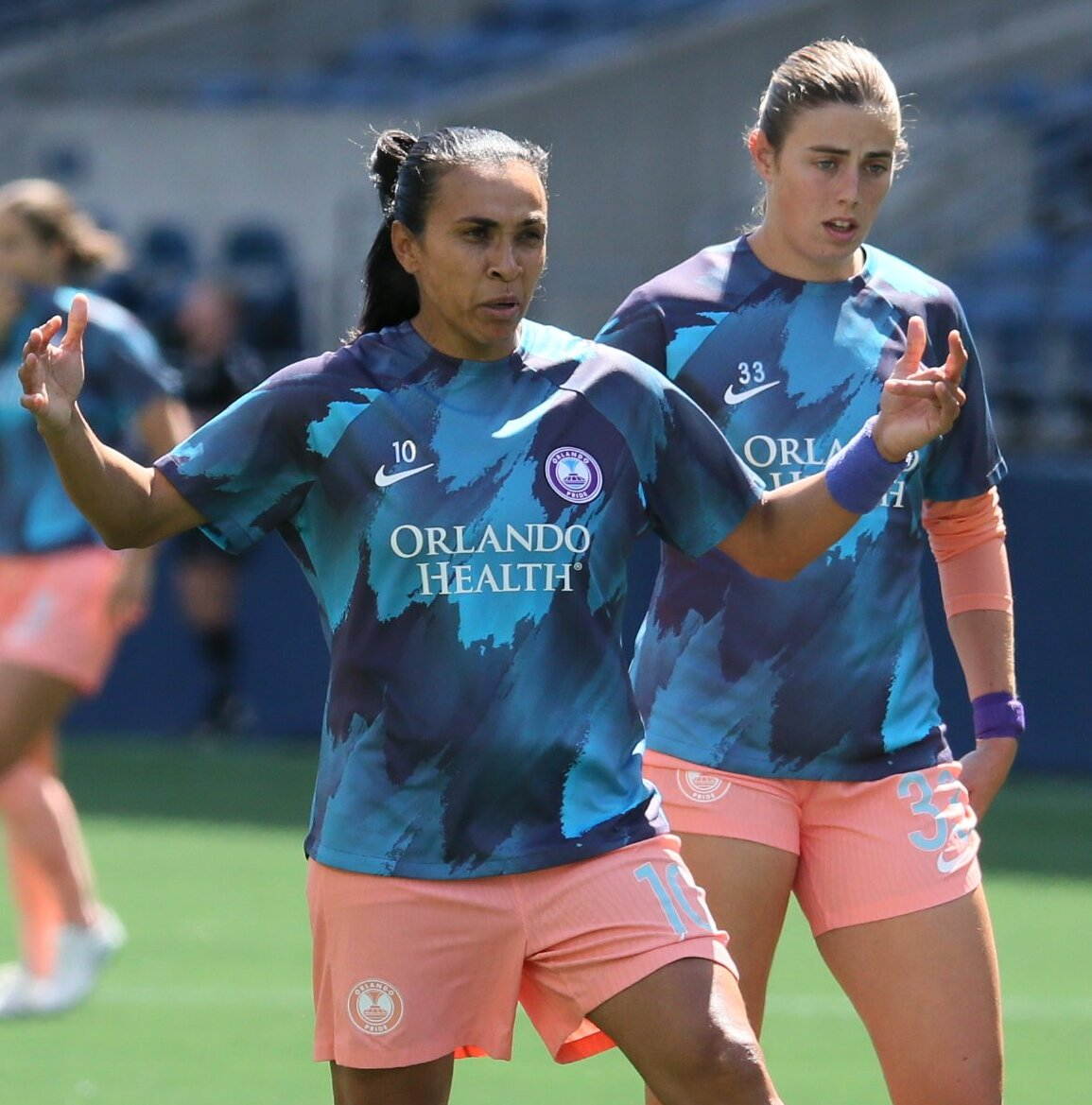
Kerr (right) and Orlando Pride teammate Marta in 2024

The Orlando Pride drafted Kerr with the 50th overall pick in the fourth round of the 2024 NWSL Draft. She was signed to a one-year contract. She made her professional debut on June 7, coming on as a second-half substitute for Ally Watt in a 1–1 draw with the San Diego Wave. She earned her first start in the NWSL x Liga MX Femenil Summer Cup on July 27, scoring her first professional goal in a 2–2 draw with Monterrey; she then converted the final penalty in a 5–4 shootout victory. On August 29, having made just four appearances for Orlando, she was waived to be able to pursue other opportunities.

=== Como ===
Italian club Como announced the signing of Kerr on October 4, 2024. She debuted for the club the next day, coming off the bench in a 3–1 defeat to Fiorentina. On October 20, she made her first start and assisted twice in Eli del Estal's hat trick as Como won 4–2 against Sassuolo. On November 17, she scored her first goal for the club in a 1–0 win over AC Milan. She finished the 2024–25 season with 6 goals and 4 assists in 22 games, tied for third on the team in points, as Como placed seventh in the league.

=== Parma ===
On January 23, 2025, after scoring once through nine league games for Como, Kerr transferred to fellow Italian club Parma, signing a one-and-a-half-year contract. She debuted for the club in a 3–0 defeat to Juventus. She finished the 2025–26 season with 1 goal in 20 games, including 11 appearances for Parma without scoring.

=== Porto ===
On August 17, 2026, Kerr signed with newly promoted Portuguese side Porto. She debuted for the club in a 1–1 draw with Braga on September 21, the second game of the season. On November 7, she scored her first goal for Porto in a 2–2 draw with Braga in the Taça da Liga – her first goal in nearly a year. The following game, she scored her first league goal for the club in a 5–1 victory over Sporting CP.

== Personal life ==
Kerr's mother, Tracy DiMillio Kerr, played college soccer at Virginia, coached at Providence College, and later coached Kerr's youth club team. Her father, John Kerr Jr., played professionally and now coaches the Duke Blue Devils men's soccer team. Her grandfather, John Kerr Sr., was an all-star for the New York Cosmos. Her twin brother, Cameron, and her younger brother, Drew, both played for their father at Duke.

== Career statistics ==
=== Club ===
As of August 1, 2024

Club	Season	League			Cup (Note: Includes NWSL x Liga MX Femenil Summer Cup)		Playoffs (Note: Includes NWSL Playoffs)		Total	
Club	Season	Division	Apps	Goals	Apps	Goals	Apps	Goals	Apps	Goals
Orlando Pride	2024	NWSL	1	0	3	1	—		4	1
Career total			1	0	3	1	0	0	4	1

== Honors and awards ==
Vanderbilt Commodores

- SEC women's soccer tournament: 2020

Texas Tech Red Raiders

- Big 12 Conference: 2023

Orlando Pride

- NWSL Shield: 2024

Individual

- Second-team All-Big 12: 2023
