= Cori Dyke =

American soccer player (born 2000)

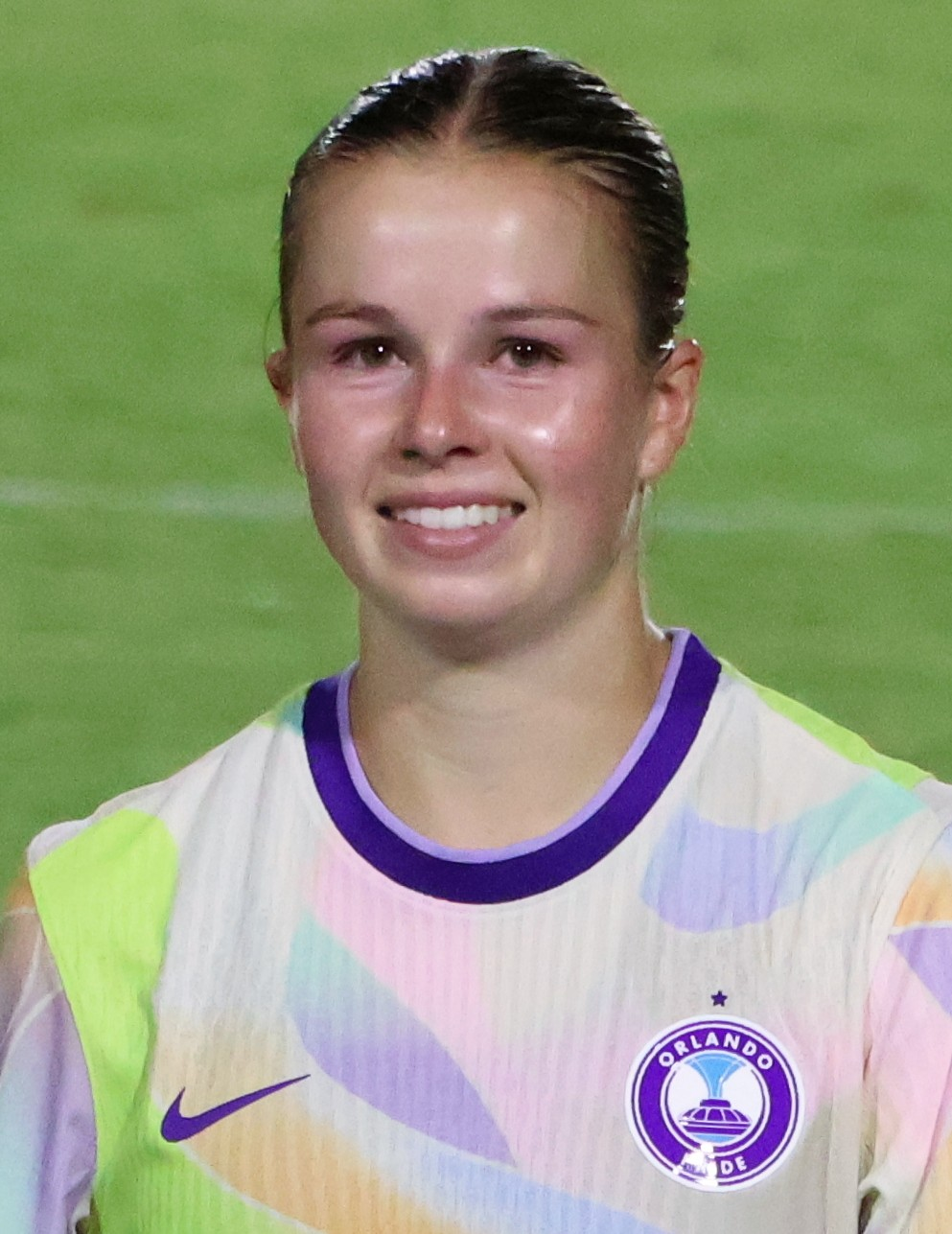
- Dyke with the Orlando Pride in 2026

Personal information
- Full name: Coriana Janet Ruggiero Dyke
- Date of birth: September 20, 2000 (age 26)
- Place of birth: San Jose, California, United States
- Height: 5 ft 6 in (1.68 m)
- Positions: Center back; full back

Team information
- Current team: Orlando Pride
- Number: 12

Youth career
- Colorado Rush
- Colorado Rapids

College career
Years	Team	Apps	(Gls)
2019–2023	Penn State Nittany Lions	108	(9)

Senior career*
Years	Team	Apps	(Gls)
2024–	Orlando Pride	73	(2)

International career
2016	United States U-16		
2017–2018	United States U-18		
2017–2018	United States U-19	3	(1)
2018–2019	United States U-20	4	(1)
- * Club domestic league appearances and goals as of 03:24, November 8, 2026 (UTC)

Coriana Janet Ruggiero Dyke (born September 20, 2000) is an American professional soccer player who plays as a defender for the Orlando Pride of the National Women's Soccer League (NWSL).

Dyke played college soccer for the Penn State Nittany Lions and was named Big Ten Defender of the Year in 2023. She was drafted by the Pride in the second round of the 2024 NWSL Draft, winning the NWSL Shield and NWSL Championship in her rookie season.

== Early life ==
Dyke was born in San Jose, California. Her family moved to Littleton, Colorado, when she was seven. She captained her club soccer teams in the academy programs of the Colorado Rush at the under-16/17 level and the Colorado Rapids at under-19. She was named United Soccer Coaches All-American in 2017 and second-team TopDrawerSoccer All-American in 2019. She attended Valor Christian High School and committed to Pennsylvania State University as a sophomore.

== College career ==
Dyke started all 108 games for the Penn State Nittany Lions over her five years with the team, accruing the most appearances in program history. In her freshman season in 2019, she came into the program as the replacement for graduate Emily Ogle as the team's starting defensive midfielder. She helped the team win the Big Ten tournament that year and was named to the Big Ten all-freshman and TopDrawerSoccer Freshman Best XI teams. In her sophomore year in 2020, the team won the Big 12 regular season title.

During her senior season in 2022, Dyke was described by Penn State head coach Erica Dambach as "the franchise ... We go through her". She scored her first career goal that year against Liberty and finished the season with four goals. She helped lead the team to the Big Ten championship and was named to the all-tournament team. Dyke returned for a fifth year in 2023, contributing to the team's solid defense at central midfielder or center back. She recorded a career-high five goals and six assists. Penn State made it to the quarterfinals of the NCAA tournament. In her fifth and final season, Dyke was named the Big Ten Defender of the Year, first-team All-Big Ten, second-team United Soccer Coaches All-American, first-team TopDrawerSoccer All-American.

== Club career ==
Dyke was drafted by the Orlando Pride with the 22nd overall pick in the second round of the 2024 NWSL Draft. She was signed to an initial one-year contract. She made her professional debut on April 16, coming on as a late substitute for Angelina in a 3–2 win against the Washington Spirit. Head coach Seb Hines deployed Dyke at multiple positions during the first part of the year. On July 10, she signed a one-year extension with the Pride. Soon later, she established herself as the starting right back when Brianna Martinez went out due to injury. She maintained her place in the lineup as the Pride won the NWSL Shield with the best record in the league, the club's first major trophy. She started all three playoff games and played the full match in the NWSL Championship, which Orlando won 1–0 over the Washington Spirit on a goal from Barbra Banda.

Before the following season, Dyke signed a two-year extension with Orlando, tying the player to the club through 2027. On June 7, 2025, she scored her first professional goal, netting the 1–0 game winner against the Houston Dash with the final kick of the match. She started both playoff matches at right back as the Pride were beaten 1–0 by eventual champions Gotham FC in the semifinals.

Dyke started all 30 games for the Pride in 2026, lining up at left back early in the year before moving to center back for the most of the season. She scored her only goal of the season in a 3–1 win over Bay FC. Despite missing the playoffs, she signed a new two-year extension at the end of the season keeping her under contract through 2029.

== International career ==
Dyke was first called into training camp with the United States youth national team at the under-14 level in 2014. She trained with the under-16 and under-17 teams the following year. She was selected to play friendlies with the under-16 team in 2016, the under-18 and under-19 teams in 2017, and the under-20 team in 2018. While in college, she was called up to the under-23 team for friendlies against NWSL teams in the 2022 preseason.

== Personal life ==
Dyke is the daughter of Annette and Peter Dyke. She has an older sister, Camryn, who played college soccer at Notre Dame. She announced her engagement to ice hockey player Jarod Crespo in December 2025.

== Career statistics ==
As of October 2, 2026

Club	Season	League			Cup (Note: Includes NWSL Challenge Cup)		Playoffs (Note: Includes NWSL playoffs)		Other		Total	
Club	Season	Division	Apps	Goals	Apps	Goals	Apps	Goals	Apps	Goals	Apps	Goals
Orlando Pride	2024	NWSL	21	0	—		3	0	2 (Note: Includes the 2024 NWSL x Liga MX Femenil Summer Cup)	0	26	0
Orlando Pride	2025	NWSL	22	1	0	0	2	0	3 (Note: Includes the CONCACAF W Champions Cup)	0	27	1
Orlando Pride	2026	NWSL	25	1	—		—		—		25	1
Career total			68	2	0	0	5	0	5	0	79	2

== Honors and awards ==
Penn State Nittany Lions

- Big Ten Conference tournament: 2019, 2022
- Big Ten Conference: 2020

Orlando Pride

- NWSL Championship: 2024
- NWSL Shield: 2024

Individual

- Second-team All-American: 2023
- Big Ten Defender of the Year: 2023
- First-team All-Big Ten: 2023
- Big Ten tournament all-tournament team: 2022
- Big Ten all-freshman team: 2019
