= Evelina Duljan =

Swedish footballer (born 2003)

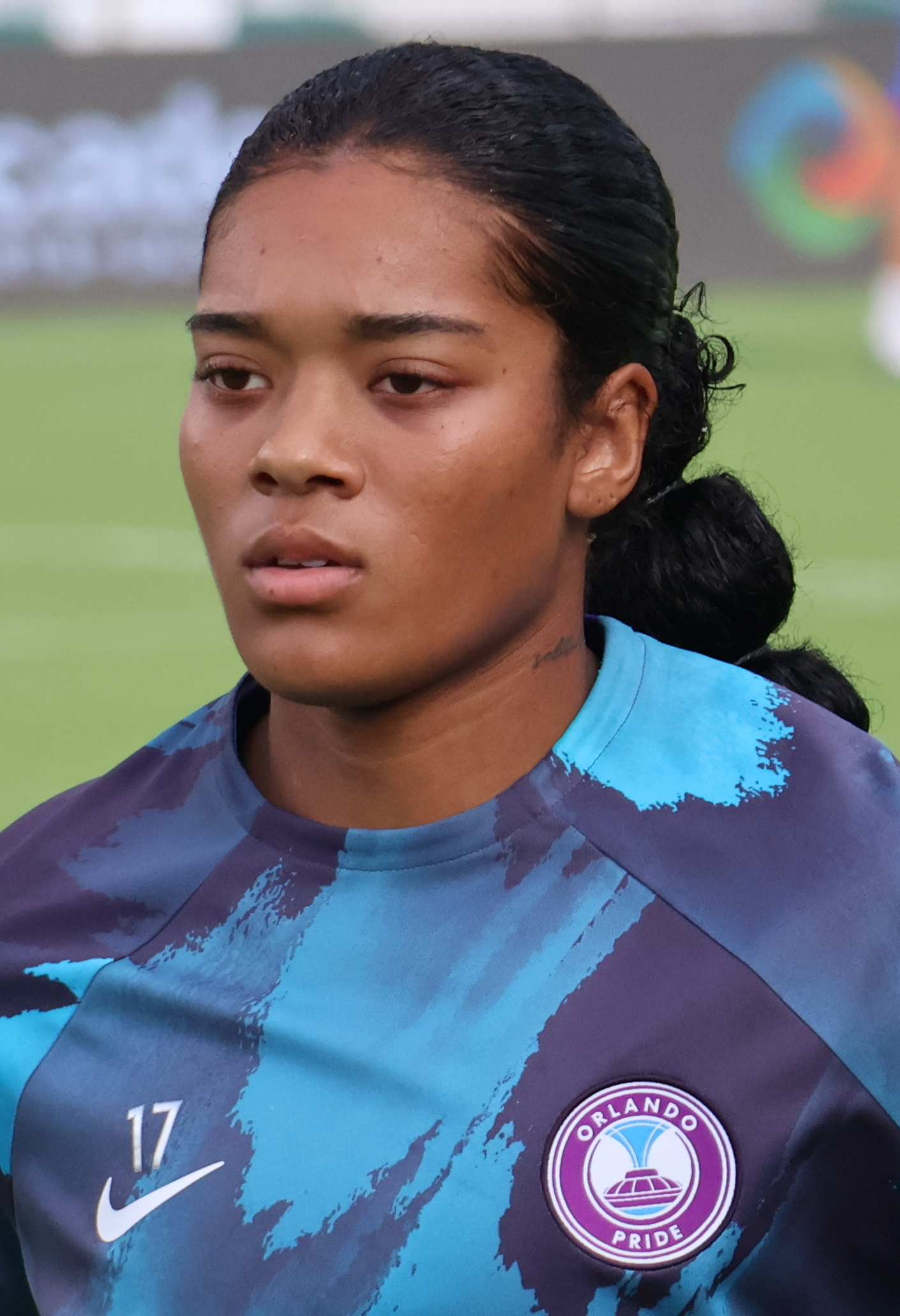
- Duljan with the Orlando Pride in 2024

Personal information
- Full name: Evelina Pirjo Jovanka Duljan
- Date of birth: 12 May 2003 (age 23)
- Place of birth: Kristianstad, Sweden
- Height: 1.60 m (5 ft 3 in)
- Positions: Right back; midfielder

Team information
- Current team: Houston Dash
- Number: 7

Youth career
- Kristianstads DFF

Senior career*
Years	Team	Apps	(Gls)
2017–2022	Kristianstads DFF	52	(4)
2021	→ Växjö DFF (loan)	5	(0)
2022–2023	Juventus	16	(0)
2024–2025	Orlando Pride	5	(0)
2025–	Houston Dash	13	(1)

International career^{‡}
2018–2020	Sweden U17	24	(4)
2019–2022	Sweden U19	10	(1)
2022–	Sweden U23	9	(0)
- * Club domestic league appearances and goals as of 23:52, 21 October 2025 (UTC) ‡ National team caps and goals as of 10 April 2023

Evelina Pirjo Jovanka Duljan (born 12 May 2003) is a Swedish professional footballer who plays as a midfielder for the Houston Dash of the National Women's Soccer League (NWSL). She won the 2024 NWSL Championship with Orlando Pride, where she made eight appearances during the season. Duljan has represented her country in U-17, U-19 and U-23 level.

== Club and International career ==
Duljan began her professional football career in Sweden with Kristianstads DFF. On 12 August 2022, Duljan joined Serie A club Juventus. She left in June 2023 following the mutual termination of her contract having made 23 appearances in all competitions.

On 2 January 2024, Duljan signed a one-year contract with Orlando Pride.

She earned her first cap for Sweden's U-23 squad on 28 October 2024, representing Sweden against the Netherlands.

After spending one season in Orlando, Duljan signed for fellow NWSL club Houston Dash on 10 February 2025. She plays as a No. 7 in midfield.

== Personal life ==
Duljan is of Nigerian descent. She played handball as a child due to the lack of a girls’ football team in her area and joined her first club at age eleven, a local side, Näsby IF.

== Honours ==
Juventus

- Coppa Italia: 2022–23

Orlando Pride

- NWSL Shield: 2024
- NWSL Championship: 2024
