= Julie Doyle (soccer, born 1998) =

American soccer player (born 1998)

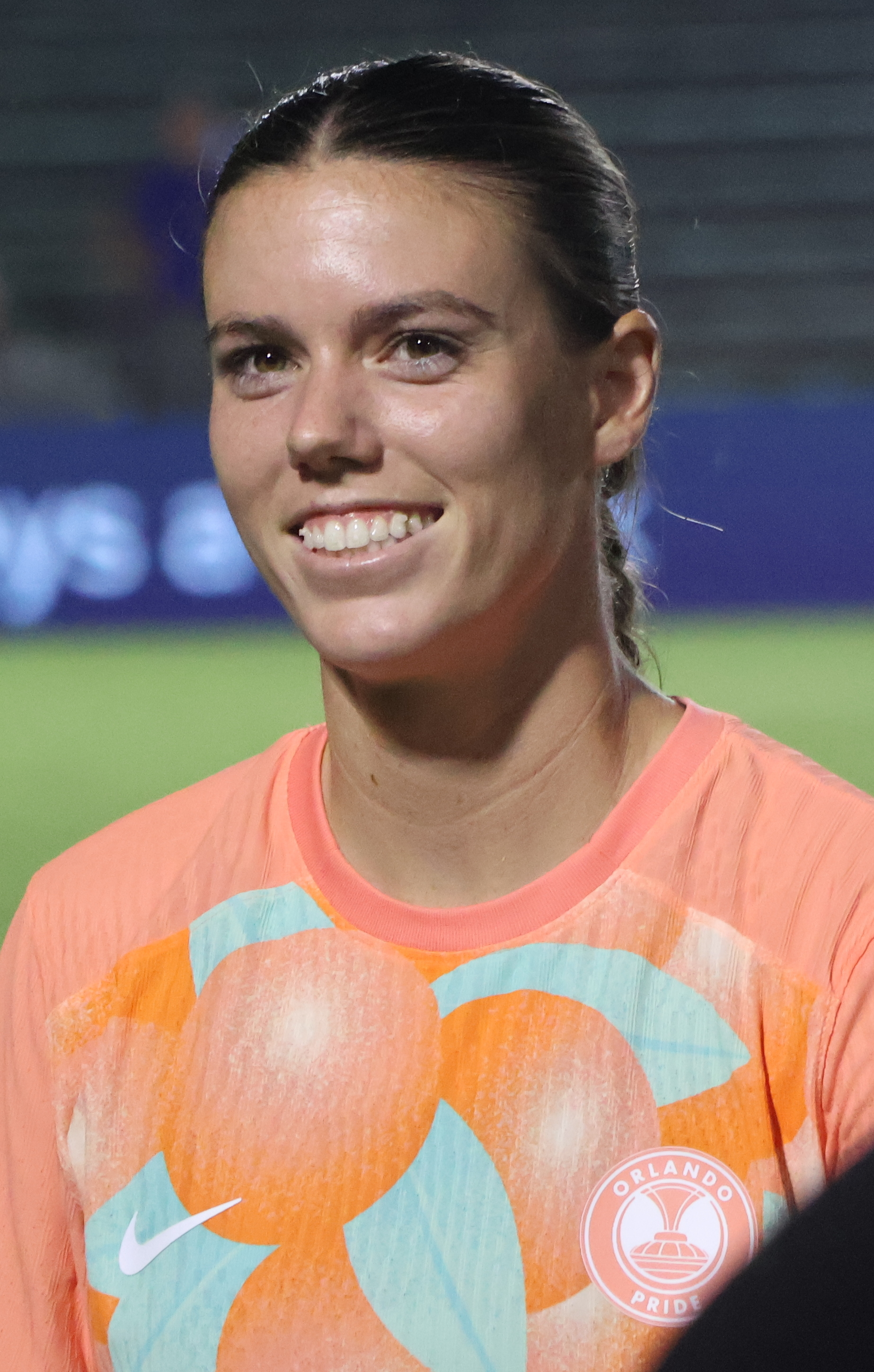
- Doyle with the Orlando Pride in 2024

Personal information
- Full name: Julie Kate Doyle
- Date of birth: August 30, 1998 (age 28)
- Place of birth: Laguna Niguel, California, United States
- Height: 5 ft 8 in (1.73 m)
- Position: Forward

Youth career
- 2007–2010: So Cal Blues
- 2012–2013: San Diego Surf
- 2013–2014: West Coast FC
- 2014–2017: San Diego Surf

College career
| Years | Team | Apps | (Gls) |
| 2017–2021 | Santa Clara Broncos | 70 | (16) |

Senior career*
| Years | Team | Apps | (Gls) |
| 2022–2026 | Orlando Pride | 90 | (8) |

International career
| 2013 | United States U15 | | |
| 2014–2016 | United States U18 | | |
| 2017 | United States U19 | | |
| 2015–2017 | United States U20 | | |
- * Club domestic league appearances and goals as of 03:23, November 8, 2026 (UTC)

Julie Kate Doyle (born August 30, 1998) is an American professional soccer player who plays as a forward. She played college soccer for the Santa Clara Broncos, where she won the 2020 national championship, before being drafted 11th overall by the Orlando Pride in the 2022 NWSL Draft. She won the NWSL Shield and NWSL Championship with the Pride in 2024.

== Early life ==
Born in Laguna Niguel, California, Doyle attended JSerra Catholic High School and captained the varsity soccer team in 2016 and 2017. She spent over a decade playing youth club soccer for So Cal Blues, San Diego Surf and West Coast FC. She was a five-time Surf Cup Champion, named 2015 and 2016 NSCAA Youth All-American and named to the ECNL ID2 Best XI her senior year.

== College career ==
Doyle played four seasons of college soccer for the Broncos at Santa Clara University between 2017 and 2021 while majoring in communication studies. As a freshman she started in 17 of 18 appearances, scoring eight goals and making three assists for what would be a career-high 19 points. She was named West Coast Conference (WCC) All-Freshman and First-Team All-WCC in her debut season.Limited to seven starts in 17 appearances in her second season, Doyle regained her starting role the following year, playing in all 23 games including 20 starts. She scored four goals including two postseason game-winners in the first and second rounds of the 2019 NCAA Tournament and was named All-WCC Second-Team.

In 2020, Doyle was named captain ahead of her senior season. She appeared in all 12 matches during the shortened season as a result of the COVID-19 pandemic. She scored one goal and added four assists as the Broncos won the WCC title for the first time since 2013 before beating Florida State Seminoles in a penalty shoot-out in the 2020 College Cup final to win the second national championship title in program history. Doyle stepped up and scored the shootout's first penalty.

Despite being granted an additional year of eligibility as a result of the pandemic, Doyle declined and did not return to Santa Clara for the 2021 season, instead moving to England to train full-time with professional second tier team London City Lionesses from September to December 2021.

== Club career ==
On December 18, 2021, Doyle was selected in the first round (11th overall) of the 2022 NWSL Draft by Orlando Pride. She was signed to a one-year contract with an additional option year on January 27, 2022. She made her professional debut on April 16, 2022, as a 70th-minute substitute in a 2022 NWSL Challenge Cup 4–2 defeat at home to North Carolina Courage. She spent five total years with the Pride, contributing to NWSL Shield and NWSL Championship titles in 2024 and scoring 8 goals across 90 league appearances.

== International career ==
Doyle was part of the United States youth national team setup from 2013 to 2017, playing at under-15, under-18, under-19 and under-20 level. She was called up to a total of 23 camps in five years, playing in 16 matches across all age groups. In 2016, she was named as an alternate for the 2016 FIFA U20 World Cup, travelling with the team to Papua New Guinea. As a senior in high school, Doyle was the only non-college player to travel with the squad.

== Career statistics ==
=== College summary ===
| School | Season | Division | Apps | Goals |
|---|---|---|---|---|
| Santa Clara Broncos | 2017 | Div. I | 18 | 8 |
| Santa Clara Broncos | 2018 | Div. I | 17 | 3 |
| Santa Clara Broncos | 2019 | Div. I | 23 | 4 |
| Santa Clara Broncos | 2020–21 | Div. I | 12 | 1 |
| Career total | | | 70 | 16 |

=== Club summary ===
As of September 27, 2026

| Club | Season | League | | | Cup (Note: Includes the NWSL Challenge Cup) | | Playoffs (Note: Includes NWSL playoffs) | | Other | | Total | |
| Club | Season | Division | Apps | Goals | Apps | Goals | Apps | Goals | Apps | Goals | Apps | Goals |
|---|---|---|---|---|---|---|---|---|---|---|---|---|
| Orlando Pride | 2022 | NWSL | 15 | 2 | 2 | 0 | — | | — | | 17 | 2 |
| Orlando Pride | 2023 | NWSL | 16 | 2 | 4 | 0 | — | | — | | 20 | 2 |
| Orlando Pride | 2024 | NWSL | 24 | 2 | — | | 3 | 0 | 3 (Note: Includes the 2024 NWSL x Liga MX Femenil Summer Cup) | 1 | 30 | 3 |
| Orlando Pride | 2025 | NWSL | 11 | 1 | 1 | 0 | 2 (Note: Appearances in NWSL playoffs) | 0 | 4 (Note: Appearances in CONCACAF W Champions Cup) | 2 | 18 | 3 |
| Orlando Pride | 2026 | NWSL | 22 | 1 | — | | 0 | 0 | — | | 22 | 1 |
| Career total | | | 88 | 8 | 7 | 0 | 5 | 0 | 7 | 3 | 208 | 11 |

== Honors ==
Orlando Pride

- NWSL Shield: 2024
- NWSL Championship: 2024

Santa Clara Broncos

- NCAA Division I Women's Soccer Championship: 2020
- West Coast Conference regular season: 2020
