= Summer Yates =

American soccer player (born 2000)

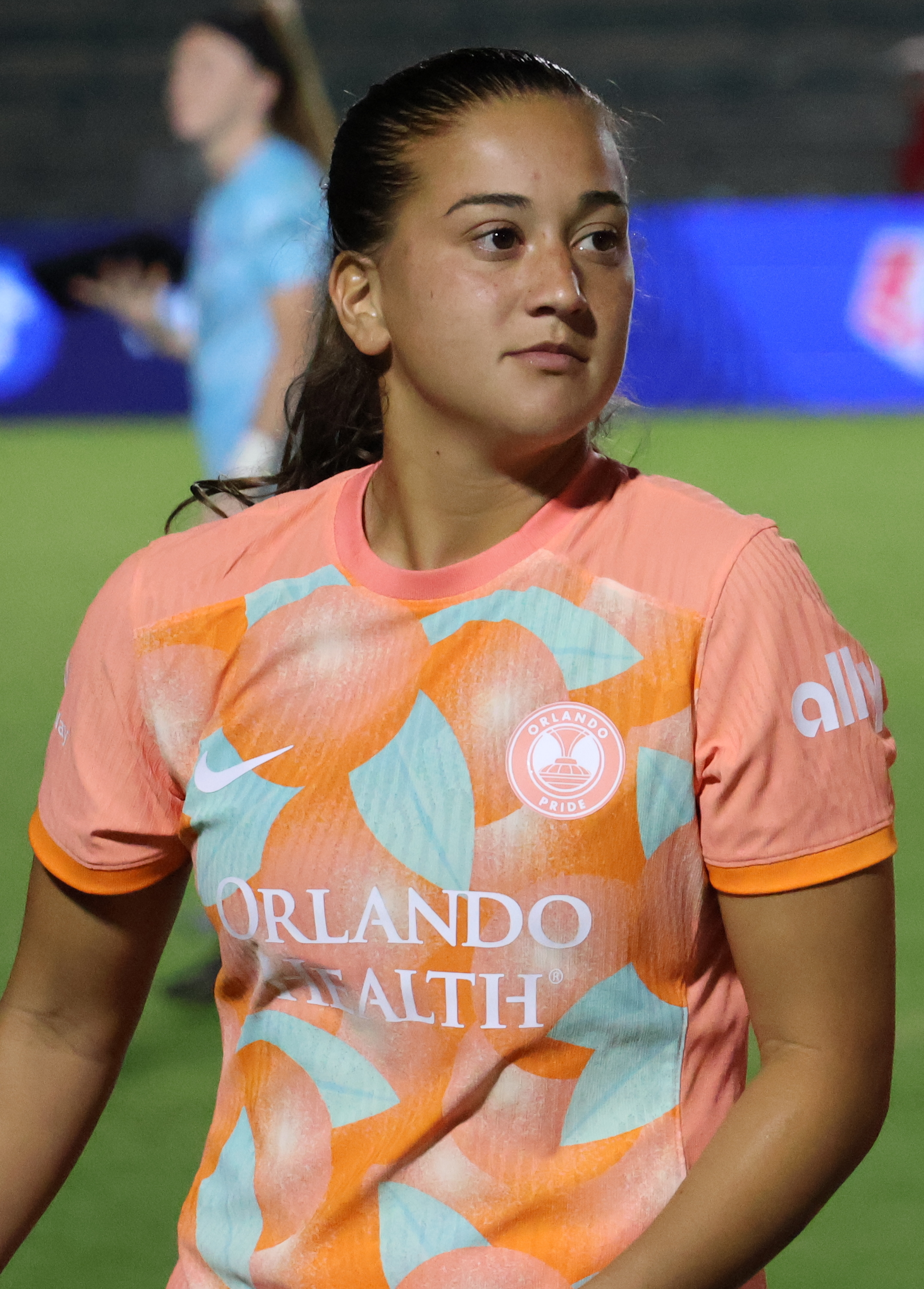
- Yates with the Orlando Pride in 2024

Personal information
- Full name: Summer Faith Yates
- Date of birth: June 17, 2000 (age 26)
- Place of birth: Pasco, Washington, United States
- Height: 5 ft 4 in (1.63 m)
- Position: Midfielder

Team information
- Current team: Orlando Pride
- Number: 28

Youth career
- Pacific Northwest SC

College career
Years	Team	Apps	(Gls)
2018–2022	Washington Huskies	93	(17)

Senior career*
Years	Team	Apps	(Gls)
2023–	Orlando Pride	73	(5)

International career
2017–2018	United States U18		
2017–2018	United States U19	3	(0)
2019–2020	United States U20	9	(6)
2019–2022	United States U23	3	(0)
- * Club domestic league appearances and goals as of 03:30, November 8, 2026 (UTC)

Summer Faith Yates (born June 17, 2000) is an American professional soccer player who plays as a midfielder for the Orlando Pride of the National Women's Soccer League (NWSL). Internationally she has represented the United States at multiple youth levels.

== Early life ==
Born in Pasco, Washington, Yates played youth club for Pacific Northwest SC where she won a state championship. She prepped at Chiawana High School where she was named Mid-Columbia Conference Player of the Year and Gatorade Player of the Year for the state of Washington as a senior, as well as a two-time 4A All-State First Team selection. Yates also played basketball and ran cross country.

=== College career ===
Yates played five seasons of college soccer at the University of Washington between 2018 and 2022 while majoring in education, communities and organizations. A starter in all five seasons, Yates made a total of 93 appearances for the Huskies (86 starts), ranking third all-time in program history for goals with 27 and fourth all-time for assists with 23. She was named All-Pac-12 First Team in each of her final three seasons and was NSCAA All-America Second Team for the 2020–21 season, the first Husky since Tina Frimpong in 2004 to be named All-American.

== Club career ==
=== Orlando Pride, 2023– ===
On January 12, 2023, Yates was selected in the fourth round (39th overall) of the 2023 NWSL Draft by Orlando Pride. She signed a two-year contract with an additional option year on March 7. She made her debut on March 26, entering as a 53rd-minute substitute for Marta in Orlando's 2023 season opener, a 4–0 defeat away to Portland Thorns FC.

In the 2024 NWSL season opener, Yates scored the equalizer in the 86th minute for a 2–2 draw against Racing Louisville. On July 11, she extended her contract through 2025 with an option for 2026.

== International career ==
Yates was frequently called in to youth national team camps, beginning at under-14 level in 2014. She participated in multiple exhibition tournaments, notably scoring a hattrick against Iran under-16s at the 2016 Torneo Femminile Delle Nazioni in Italy, the first meeting of the two nations in women's soccer at any age level. In February 2017, she was called up for the under-18 squad for a series of friendlies in England before being elevated to the under-19s later in the year to participate in the CFA Tournament in China.

In February 2019, Yates was called up to the under-20 squad for the invitational U20 La Manga Tournament. In April 2019, she was one of five players from the under-20 pool to be named for the U23 La Manga Tournament. In 2020, she was called up by Laura Harvey to the United States under-20 team to compete at the 2020 CONCACAF U-20 Championship. She appeared as a substitute in the opening match and scored one goal and one assist in a 9–0 victory over Cuba. She started the next game against Honduras, scoring a further two goals and registering one assist as the United States won 11–0. In total she made five appearances as the United States won the title for the sixth time. Yates returned to the under-23 team in February 2022 for the Thorns Invitational.

== Career statistics ==
=== College summary ===
Team	Season	Pac-12			NCAA Tournament		Total	
Team	Season	Division	Apps	Goals	Apps	Goals	Apps	Goals
Washington Huskies	2018	Div. I	19	3	—		19	3
Washington Huskies	2019	Div. I	19	8	2	0	21	8
Washington Huskies	2020–21	Div. I	15	4	1	0	16	4
Washington Huskies	2021	Div. I	18	5	—		18	5
Washington Huskies	2022	Div. I	19	7	—		19	7
Total			90	17	3	0	93	17

=== Club summary ===
As of October 2, 2026

Club	Season	League			Cup (Note: Includes NWSL Challenge Cup)		Playoffs (Note: Includes NWSL playoffs)		Other		Total	
Club	Season	Division	Apps	Goals	Apps	Goals	Apps	Goals	Apps	Goals	Apps	Goals
Orlando Pride	2023	NWSL	10	0	6	0	—		—		16	0
Orlando Pride	2024	NWSL	25	5	—		3	0	3 (Note: Includes the 2024 NWSL x Liga MX Femenil Summer Cup)	0	31	5
Orlando Pride	2025	NWSL	16	0	1	0	0	0	4	0	21	0
Orlando Pride	2026	NWSL	20	0	—		0	0	—		20	0
Career total			71	5	7	0	3	0	7	0	88	5

== Honors ==
Orlando Pride

- NWSL Shield: 2024
- NWSL Championship: 2024

United States U20

- CONCACAF Women's U-20 Championship: 2020
