= Ally Lemos =

American soccer player (born 2004)

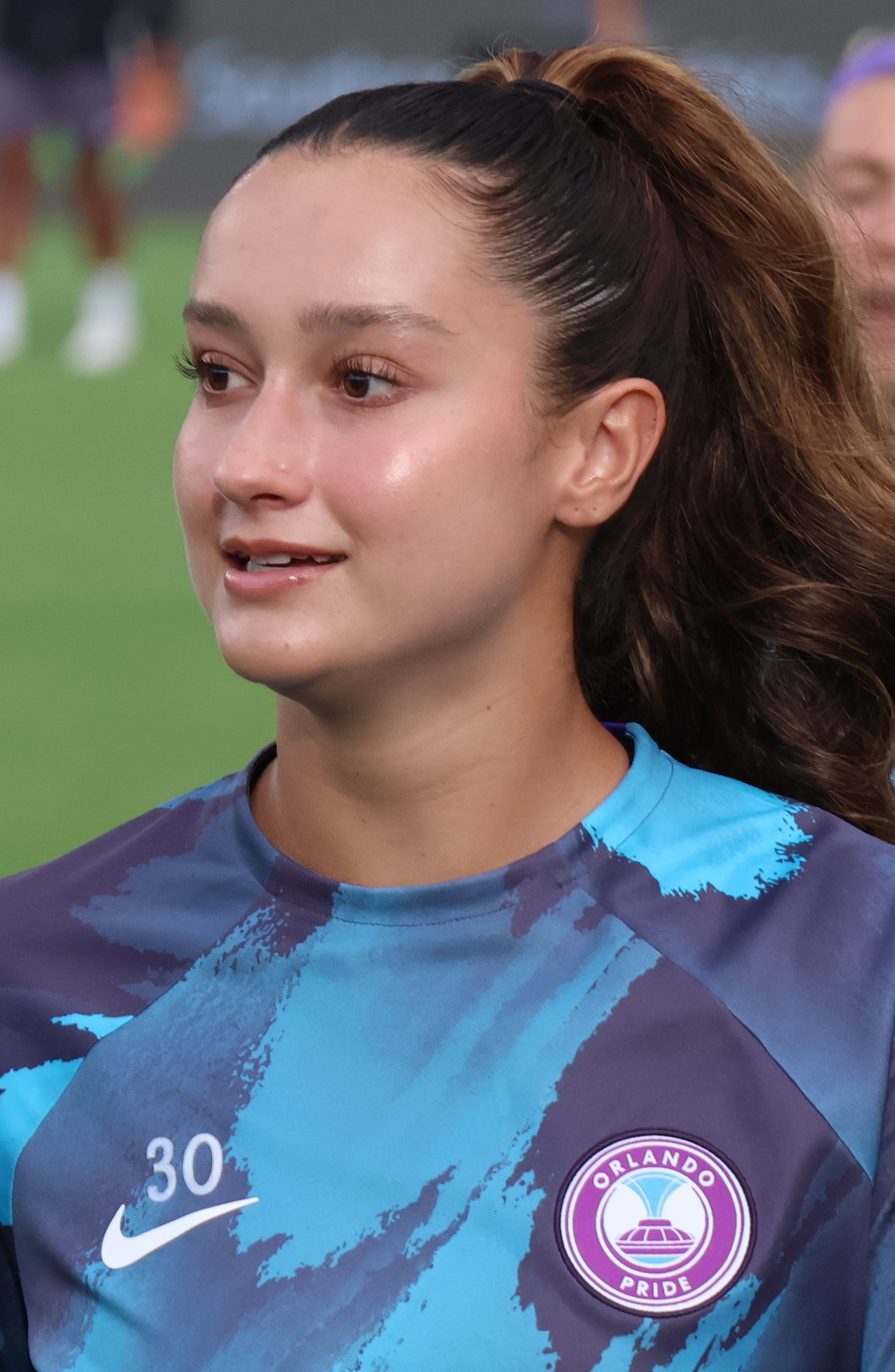
- Lemos with the Orlando Pride in 2024

Personal information
- Full name: Ally Olivia Lemos
- Date of birth: March 4, 2004 (age 22)
- Place of birth: Pasadena, California, United States
- Height: 5 ft 7 in (1.70 m)
- Position: Midfielder

Team information
- Current team: Orlando Pride
- Number: 6

Youth career
- Legends FC

College career
Years	Team	Apps	(Gls)
2022–2023	UCLA Bruins	44	(3)

Senior career*
Years	Team	Apps	(Gls)
2024–	Orlando Pride	69	(1)

International career^{‡}
2018	United States U14		
2020	United States U16	3	(1)
2021–2023	United States U18		
2023–2024	United States U20	19	(1)
2025–	United States U23	3	(0)
Medal record
Women's soccer
FIFA U-20 Women's World Cup
Bronze medal – third place	Colombia 2024
- * Club domestic league appearances and goals as of 03:25, November 8, 2026 (UTC) ‡ National team caps and goals as of 14:12, March 8, 2026 (UTC)

Ally Olivia Lemos (born March 4, 2004) is an American professional soccer player who plays as a midfielder for the Orlando Pride of the National Women's Soccer League (NWSL).

Lemos played collegiately for the UCLA Bruins, where she won the 2022 national championship. She was selected by the Pride in the first round of the 2024 NWSL Draft and won the NWSL Shield in her rookie season. Internationally, she represented the United States from the under-14 to under-20 level, helping win bronze at the 2024 FIFA U-20 Women's World Cup.

== Early life ==
Born in Pasadena, California, Lemos lettered one year in soccer at San Dimas High School. In 2021 she was named team MVP and San Gabriel Valley Tribune Soccer Player of the Year after scoring 46 goals and leading her team to a regional championship. She played ECNL club soccer for Legends FC. Away from soccer, Lemos also lettered three years in volleyball and was a two-time first-team all-league honoree.

=== College career ===
Lemos played two seasons of college soccer for the UCLA Bruins at the University of California, Los Angeles between 2022 and 2023. Part of the number one ranked recruiting class in the nation, she enrolled early during the winter quarter and played with the team throughout the spring season. As a freshman, Lemos started all 25 games, registered a conference-leading nine assists and also scored one goal. She was named to the Pac-12 All-Freshman team as well as the NCAA College Cup All-Tournament team as UCLA won the 2022 National Championship, the second in program history. As a sophomore she started all 19 games, leading all outfield players in minutes. She scored two goals and two assists as UCLA won the Pac-12 regular season title. Lemos ended the year with first-team All-Pac-12 honors.

== Club career ==
=== Orlando Pride ===
After two seasons at UCLA, Lemos declared for the 2024 NWSL Draft. She was selected in the first round (9th overall) by Orlando Pride. At the time of her selection, she became the fourth-youngest player drafted in to the NWSL. She signed a two-year contract with the club on January 26.

== International career ==
Lemos has represented the United States at youth level from under-14 to under-20 level. In February 2020, Lemos was part of a 20-player roster coached by Katie Schoepfer at the U16 EUFA Tournament in England. In May 2023, Lemos was named to the under-20 squad for the 2023 CONCACAF Women's U-20 Championship. She played in all five games and scored one goal, a penalty during a 6–0 group stage victory over Panama. The United States finished runners-up, losing the final 2–1 to Mexico. She was selected to the roster for the 2024 FIFA U-20 Women's World Cup. She started two matches in place of Claire Hutton at the U-20 Women's World Cup, where the United States finished in third place. In the quarterfinals, trailing Germany 2–0, Lemos sparked a comeback with a long ball to Jordynn Dudley in the 90+8th minute; Ally Sentnor tied the game a minute later and the United States advanced to the semifinals on penalties. She is also eligible to play for the Argentina national team.

== Career statistics ==
As of October 2, 2026

Club	Season	League			Cup (Note: Includes NWSL Challenge Cup)		Playoffs (Note: Includes NWSL playoffs)		Other		Total	
Club	Season	Division	Apps	Goals	Apps	Goals	Apps	Goals	Apps	Goals	Apps	Goals
Orlando Pride	2024	NWSL	13	0	—		0	0	3 (Note: Includes the 2024 NWSL x Liga MX Femenil Summer Cup)	0	16	0
Orlando Pride	2025	NWSL	26	0	1	0	2	0	2 (Note: Includes the CONCACAF W Champions Cup)	1	31	1
Orlando Pride	2026	NWSL	26	2	—		—		—		26	2
Career total			65	2	1	0	2	0	5	1	73	3

== Honors ==
UCLA Bruins

- NCAA Women's College Cup: 2022
- Pac-12 Conference: 2023

Orlando Pride

- NWSL Shield: 2024
- NWSL Championship: 2024
