= Angelina (footballer) =

American soccer player (born 2000)

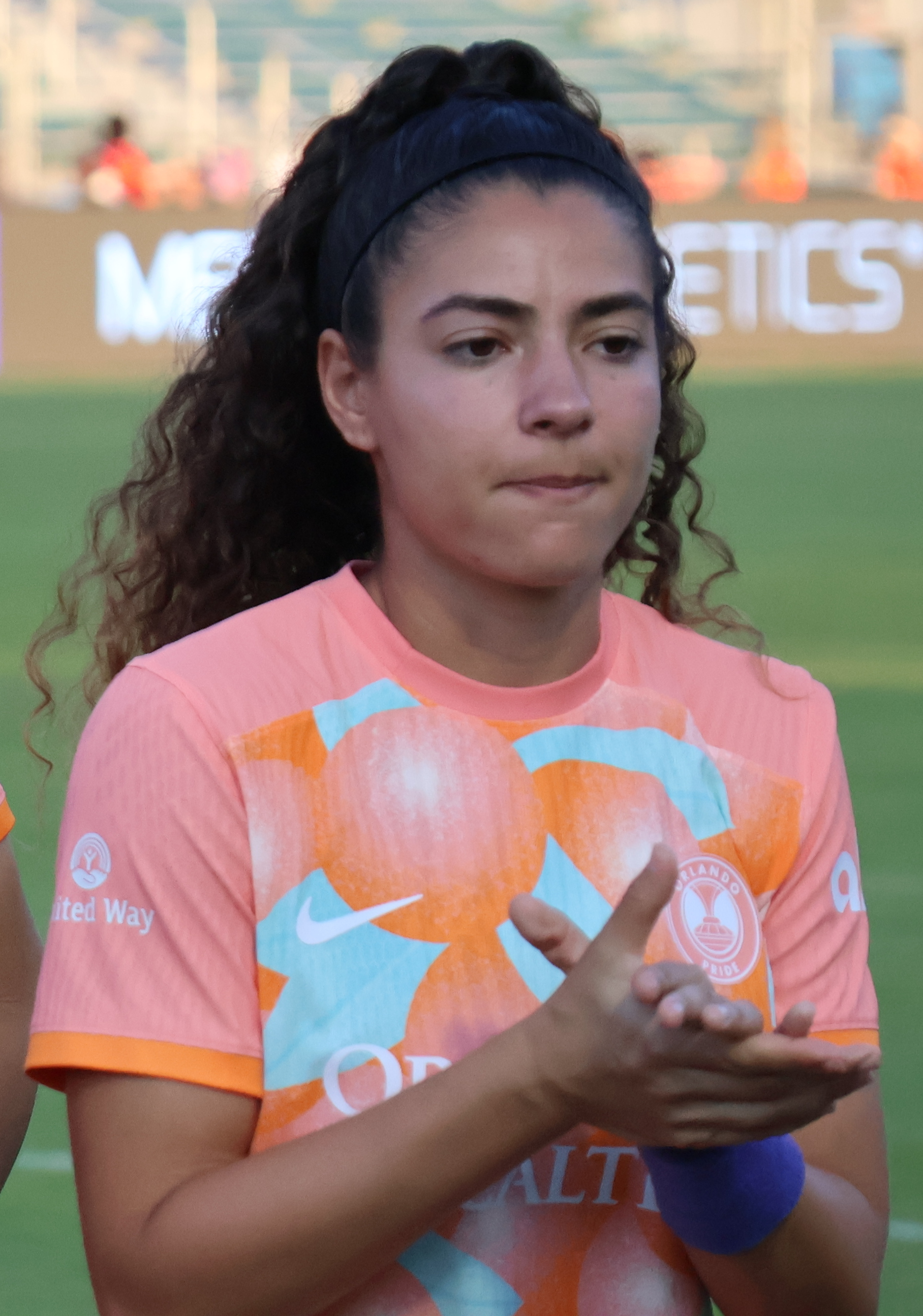
- Angelina with the Orlando Pride in 2024

Personal information
- Full name: Angelina Alonso Costantino
- Date of birth: 26 January 2000 (age 26)
- Place of birth: Jersey City, New Jersey, United States
- Height: 1.60 m (5 ft 3 in)
- Position: Midfielder

Team information
- Current team: Orlando Pride
- Number: 7

Senior career*
Years	Team	Apps	(Gls)
2017–2019	Santos	24	(1)
2020	Palmeiras	14	(0)
2021–2023	OL Reign	28	(0)
2024–	Orlando Pride	72	(2)

International career^{‡}
2016	Brazil U17	3	(0)
2017–2020	Brazil U20	13	(0)
2021–	Brazil	23	(1)
Medal record
Women's football
Representing Brazil
Copa América Femenina
Gold medal – first place	2025 Ecuador
Olympic Games
Silver medal – second place	2024 Paris
- * Club domestic league appearances and goals as of 03:22, 8 November 2026 (UTC) ‡ National team caps and goals as of 6 December 2023

Angelina Alonso Costantino (born 26 January 2000), commonly known as Angelina, is a professional footballer who plays as a midfielder for National Women's Soccer League club Orlando Pride. Born in the United States, she has represented the Brazil national team internationally.

== Club career ==
Angelina began her professional career in Brazil with Brasileiro Feminino club Santos. She made her debut for the club on 17 May 2017 against Ponte Preta, coming on as an 81st-minute substitute in a 2–0 victory. Angelina scored her first career goal for Santos on 24 April 2019 against Ponte Preta, which was the only goal in a 1–0 victory.

Prior to the 2020 season, Angelina joined Palmeiras, making her debut on 16 February 2020 against Ferroviária.

=== OL Reign ===
On 5 January 2021, Angelina moved to the United States and joined National Women's Soccer League club OL Reign. She made her debut for the club on 16 April 2021 in the NWSL Challenge Cup against the Houston Dash.

=== Orlando Pride ===
On 13 December 2023, Orlando Pride announced the signing of Angelina as a free agent on a three-year contract ahead of the 2024 season.

== International career ==
Angelina has represented Brazil at the under-17 and under-20 level.

Angelina was called up to the Brazil squad for the 2022 Copa América Femenina, which Brazil finished as winners.

Angelina was called up to the Brazil squad for the 2023 FIFA Women's World Cup.

On 2 July 2024, Angelina was called up to the Brazil squad for the 2024 Summer Olympics.

== Personal life ==
Angelina was born in Jersey City, New Jersey, to Brazilian parents.

== Career statistics ==
=== Club ===
As of 2 October 2026

Appearances and goals by club, season and competition
Club	Season	League			Cup (Note: Includes the NWSL Challenge Cup)		Playoffs (Note: Includes NWSL playoffs)		Continental		Total	
Club	Season	Division	Apps	Goals	Apps	Goals	Apps	Goals	Apps	Goals	Apps	Goals
Santos	2017	Brasileiro Feminino	3	0	—		—		—		3	0
Santos	2018	Brasileiro Feminino	5	0	—		—		—		5	0
Santos	2019	Brasileiro Feminino	16	1	—		—		—		16	1
Santos	Total		24	1	0	0	0	0	0	0	24	1
Palmeiras	2020	Brasileiro Feminino	14	0	—		—		—		14	0
OL Reign	2021	NWSL	16	0	3	0	0	0	—		19	0
OL Reign	2022	NWSL	8	0	4	1	0	0	—		12	1
OL Reign	2023	NWSL	4	0	1	0	0	0	—		5	0
OL Reign	Total		28	0	8	1	0	0	0	0	36	1
Orlando Pride	2024	NWSL	21	2	—		3	0	—		24	2
Orlando Pride	2025	NWSL	24	0	1	0	2	0	2 (Note: Appearances in CONCACAF W Champions Cup)	0	29	0
Orlando Pride	2026	NWSL	24	0	0	0	—		—		24	0
Orlando Pride	Total		69	2	1	0	5	0	2	0	77	2
Career total			134	3	9	1	5	0	2	0	151	4

=== International ===
Statistics accurate as of match played 6 December 2023.

Year	Brazil	
Year	Apps	Goals
2021	9	1
2022	11	0
2023	3	0
Total	23	1

=== International goals ===
No.	Date	Venue	Opponent	Score	Result	Competition
1	17 September 2021	Almeidão, João Pessoa, Brazil	Argentina	3–0	3–1	Friendly
2	2 August 2025	Estadio Rodrigo Paz Delgado, Quito, Brazil	Colombia	1–1	4–4	2025 Copa América Femenina
3.	14 April 2026	Arena Pantanal, Cuiabá, Brazil	Zambia	3–1	6–1	2026 FIFA Series
4.	10 October 2026	Estádio Beira-Rio, Porto Alegre, Brazil	Argentina	3–0	3–1	Friendly

== Honors ==
OL Reign

- NWSL Shield: 2022
- The Women's Cup: 2022

Orlando Pride

- NWSL Shield: 2024
- NWSL Championship: 2024

Brazil

- Summer Olympics silver medal: 2024
