= Orlando Pride =

American women's soccer club

- Founded: October 20, 2015; 11 years ago
- Stadium: Inter.co Stadium; Orlando, Florida
- Capacity: 25,500
- Majority owners: Zygi, Leonard, and Mark Wilf
- Chairman: Mark Wilf
- Head coach: Yolanda Thomas
- League: National Women's Soccer League
- 2026: Regular season: 11th of 16; Playoffs: DNQ
- Website: orlandocitysc.com/pride
Home colors	Away colors

The Orlando Pride are an American professional soccer team based in Orlando, Florida, that competes in the National Women's Soccer League (NWSL). The Pride began play in the 2016 season. They were the tenth team to be added to the league and play their home games at Inter.co Stadium in downtown Orlando.

The Pride are under the same ownership group as Orlando City SC of Major League Soccer (MLS) and were included in the sale of the club in 2021. The team won their first titles during the 2024 season, claiming both the NWSL Shield and NWSL Championship.

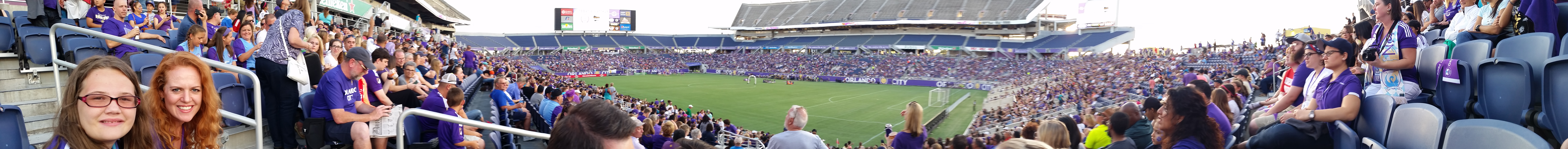
An NWSL record crowd of 23,403 at the Florida Citrus Bowl on April 23, 2016, of the franchise's first home game

== History ==
=== 2015–2018: Establishment and early years ===
Following the 2015 NWSL season, it was rumored that the Orlando City SC ownership group would be adding an expansion team to the women's professional league. On October 20, 2015, a press conference was held at Lake Eola Park where Phil Rawlins unveiled the team name, logo, and colors. Former national team head coach of Australia and the United States, Tom Sermanni, was announced as the team's first head coach.

On October 26, 2015, the Pride announced that they had made the first player acquisitions in team history; signing forward Alex Morgan and Kaylyn Kyle from Portland Thorns FC in exchange for the Pride's No. 1 picks in the 2015 NWSL Expansion Draft and the 2016 NWSL College Draft as well as an international roster spot for the 2016 and 2017 seasons, and also acquired Sarah Hagen in a separate trade with FC Kansas City along with Kansas City's second-round 2016 draft pick in exchange for the Pride's 2017 second-round draft pick. They finished their inaugural season in 9th with a record of 6–1–13.

Over the course of their 2017 season, the Pride added several significant players, trading for Washington Spirit defender and future co-captain Ali Krieger; signing five time FIFA World Player of the Year and Brazil international Marta; and officially adding Alex Morgan to the active roster following the end of her six-month loan to Olympique Lyonnais Féminin. In particular, Marta, who scored 13 goals and contributed 6 assists (second-most in both league categories that season), and Morgan, who scored 9 goals, were credited for the team's late-season offensive resurgence and success. The Pride qualified for the playoffs for the first time in franchise history as they finished the regular season in 3rd place with a record of 11–7–6. They went to Portland Thorns FC for the semi-final but lost 4–1.

To bolster a defense that allowed the most goals of any playoff team in 2017, the Pride signed Canadian international Shelina Zadorsky, outside-back Carson Pickett, and Brazilian defender Poliana. The Pride also strengthened an already potent offense with the addition of forward Sydney Leroux and midfielders Christine Nairn and Emily van Egmond. Despite these efforts, the team's struggles with key players' availabilities contributed to inconsistent on-field performances. Ultimately, the Pride finished their 2018 season in 7th place, missing the playoffs. Head coach Tom Sermanni and the Orlando Pride mutually parted ways after three seasons; Sermanni had a regular season record of 25–29–14 during his spell in Orlando, going 0–1–0 in the playoffs.

=== 2019–2022: Transitions and competitive struggles ===
==== Marc Skinner, defensive struggles, and COVID-19 (2019–2021) ====
In January 2019, Marc Skinner stepped down from his role at FA WSL side Birmingham City to become the Pride's second ever head coach.

In May 2019, plans were unveiled to build a dedicated training facility at Sylvan Lake Park, the first-ever training facility in the NWSL that is tailored to and used exclusively by a women's team. The Pride plan to finish out the 2019 season at their current facility located at Seminole Soccer Complex before moving to the new state-of-the art training ground prior to the start of the 2020 season.

The Pride's 2019 season was once again characterized by the absences of key players. As the 2019 FIFA Women's World Cup occurred in the middle of the NWSL season, the Pride temporarily lost Alex Morgan, Ali Krieger, and Ashlyn Harris; Brazilian internationals Marta and Camila; Australian internationals Emily van Egmond and Alanna Kennedy; and Canadian international Shelina Zadorsky. Concurrently, new coach Marc Skinner sought to implement a more possession-based style. This transition, in conjunction with player absences, contributed to one of the worst records in league history. The team finished the season in last place with a record of 4–4–16, having conceded a league record 53 goals in 24 games.

To address their defensive fragility, the Pride traded their 2020 NWSL Draft No. 1 pick to the Portland Thorns in exchange for defender Emily Sonnett. The Thorns also traded the NWSL rights to forward Caitlin Foord, as well as the No. 7 and No. 14 draft picks in the 2020 draft. With the introduction of allocation money, the Pride also signed veteran defender Ali Riley and defensive midfielder Jade Moore. The waiving, trading, or departure of 16 players signaled the team's intention to overhaul the roster.

The start of the regular 2020 season was halted by the start of the COVID-19 pandemic. In June and July 2020, the NWSL held the 25-game 2020 NWSL Challenge Cup tournament in a "bubble" environment in Utah. However, the Orlando Pride was forced to withdraw when multiple players and staff tested positive for COVID-19. As a result, the Pride solely played in the 2020 Fall Series, which began in September and featured a regional "pod" structure that only guaranteed four games for each team. Many veteran players had opted to sign loan or short-term contracts overseas for additional playing time, resulting in the Pride playing with a depleted roster. The Pride came last in their pod, aggregating a record of 2 draws and 2 losses. Amidst the Fall Series, the Pride exercised the contract option to keep Marc Skinner through the 2021 season.

Prior to the 2021 season, the Pride continued to rebuild the team and club structure. The organization hired Ian Fleming as Orlando Pride general manager and former NWSL managing director Amanda Duffy as the team's first executive vice president. In December 2020, the Pride traded Emily Sonnett to the Washington Spirit in exchange for midfielder Meggie Dougherty Howard, the 2021 NWSL College Draft No. 9 pick, an additional conditional first-round draft pick in the upcoming draft, and $140,000 in allocation money. Another 17 players were waived, traded, or otherwise departed, including stalwarts like Alanna Kennedy, Camila, Shelina Zadorsky, Emily van Egmond, Kristen Edmonds, and Carson Pickett. Defensive additions like Amy Turner, Kylie Strom, Courtney Petersen (No. 7 draft pick), and Phoebe McClernon (no. 14 draft pick); midfield reinforcements like Gunnhildur Jónsdóttir and Erika Tymrak; and a resurgence from the forward line, helped facilitate an improved record. On April 22, 2021, the Pride won their first competitive match in 609 days as part of the 2021 NWSL Challenge Cup. The team began their season with a seven-game unbeaten streak.

On May 12, 2021, Orlando City majority owner Flávio Augusto da Silva announced he was in advanced negotiations with Zygi and Mark Wilf, owners of the Minnesota Vikings of the NFL, for the sale of the club including the Orlando Pride and other related soccer assets. The combined value of the deal was estimated at $400–450 million. On July 21, 2021, the sale was completed.

On July 23, 2021, Marc Skinner resigned to become the head coach of Manchester United W.F.C.; assistant coach Carl Green served as interim coach for one game prior to his own departure. On July 25, former University of Florida coach Becky Burleigh became the Pride's interim coach for the rest of season. After a late-season slide, the Orlando Pride finished the regular season in 8th place with a 7–7–10 record and missed out on the playoffs.

==== Amanda Cromwell and Seb Hines (interim) (2022–2023) ====
After several months of searching, the Orlando Pride hired UCLA head coach Amanda Cromwell as head coach on December 7, 2021. The Pride also hired former USWNT player Michelle Akers as an assistant coach. Additionally, the Pride's roster saw substantial turnover as co-captains Ali Krieger and Ashlyn Harris were traded to NJ/NY Gotham FC, Alex Morgan was traded to San Diego Wave FC, and Ali Riley (and in the summer, Sydney Leroux) were traded to Angel City FC. In turn, the Pride acquired Welsh midfielder Angharad James, right-back Celia, defender Megan Oyster, goalkeeper Anna Moorhouse, and forward Ally Watt (among others) throughout the season. Defender Kerry Abello, the 2021 No. 24 draft pick, was also officially signed. Early in the 2022 season, the Pride showed some defensive improvement, but overall progress was halted as Marta tore her ACL and was placed on the season-ending injury list.

On June 7, 2022, the NWSL and the Pride placed Cromwell and assistant coach Sam Greene on "temporary administrative leave" for "retaliation in violation of the NWSL Policy to Prevent and Eliminate Workplace Discrimination, Harassment, and Bullying"; the league also placed the Pride under a roster freeze to prevent any potential retaliatory trades or player waivers. Cromwell and Greene's suspensions were conferred based on policies developed in the wake of the 2021 investigation into systematic misconduct and harassment throughout the league. Assistant coach Seb Hines was made interim head coach, making him the first Black coach in the NWSL. Hines oversaw the final 15 matches of the season, during which the Pride boasted a seven-game unbeaten streak and increased both offensive and defensive production. On October 10, 2022, following the league's investigation, Cromwell and Greene were formally terminated based on findings of "verbal abuse, 'improper favoritism,' and retaliation." Ultimately, the Pride finished the season in 10th of 12th place and with a 5–7–10 record.

The Pride officially made Seb Hines their permanent head coach on November 11, 2022.

=== 2023–2024: Steady improvement and success ===
In the 2023 preseason, the Orlando City SC ownership group increased investment in the Orlando Pride and elected to part ways with general manager Ian Fleming. On January 30, 2023, the Pride announced the hiring of Haley Carter as general manager and VP of soccer operations in a move considered to signal a new emphasis on player welfare.

The Pride's 2023 season started slowly with four consecutive losses. However, offensive improvements spearheaded by new Brazilian international Adriana and forward Julie Doyle, in addition to a more consistent defense led by Kylie Strom, centerback pairing Emily Madril and Rafaelle, and goalkeeper Anna Moorhouse, made the Pride contenders for a playoff spot. The Pride accumulated a record of 10–1–11, finishing in 7th of 12th place and just out of the playoff positions (with Angel City FC clinching the final spot on goal difference alone). Nevertheless, the club had one of its best seasons in its history to that point: the most home wins (7); the fewest goals (28) and goals per game (1.28) conceded; the most clean sheets (7); the most games won (10) since 2017; and the most goals scored in a match (5).

Subsequently, the Pride made several significant acquisitions, including Zambian forward Barbra Banda. On October 6, 2024, Orlando Pride won their first trophy, clinching the NWSL Shield with three games to spare following a 2–0 win against Washington Spirit. Pride remained unbeaten on the season to that point, a streak of 24 regular-season matches stretching back to October 2023. The streak was ended by Portland Thorns in the following game on October 11. On November 23, Orlando Pride defeated Washington Spirit at CPKC Stadium in Kansas City, Missouri in the NWSL playoffs final, allowing them to claim their first league title. Orlando Pride's championship victory made the club the first team from Orlando to win a major championship.

=== 2026 ===
On August 31, 2026, the Pride parted ways with Head Coach Seb Hines and appointed Assistant Coach Yolanda Thomas as interim head coach. Thomas is the first Black woman in league history to assume the role of head coach of an NWSL team.

=== Team name, crest and colors ===
The name Orlando Pride was announced on October 20, 2015, by founder and president Phil Rawlins. He noted that the name "captures how we all feel about the City of Orlando, as well as firmly tying into the Lions family" (in addition to being an emotion, pride is also the name given to a group of lions, with the majority of the group being females, lionesses). The team colors are purple and light blue. The logo features an illustration of the Linton E. Allen Memorial Fountain at Lake Eola Park.

=== Uniform evolution ===
Home

2016	2017–2018	2019–2020	2021–2022	2023	2024	2025–

Away

2016	2017	2018–2019	2020–2021	2022–2023	2024–25	2026–

== Stadium ==
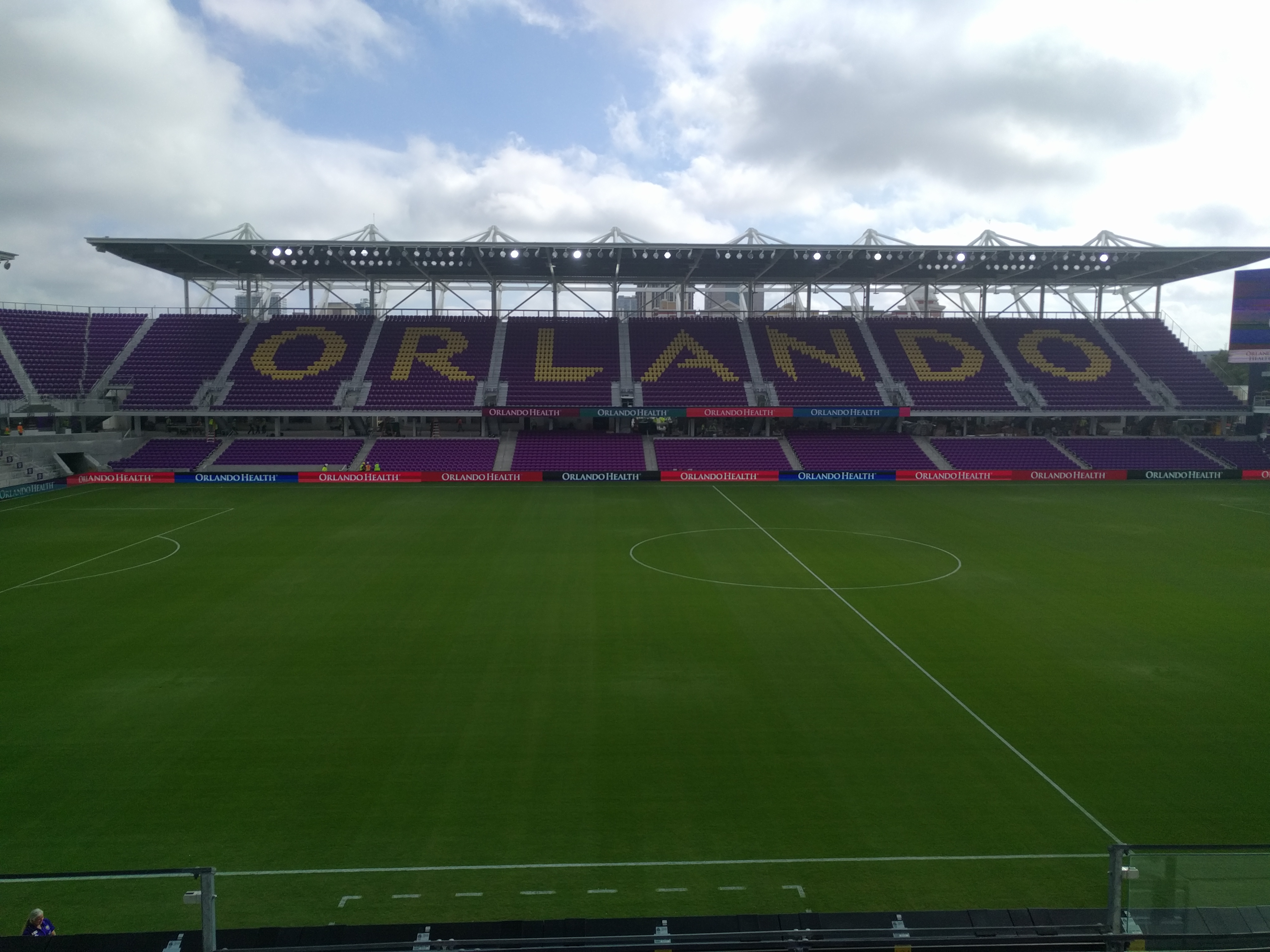
The team currently plays at Inter.co Stadium

The team plays its home games at Inter.co Stadium, in Orlando, Florida, which opened for the 2017 NWSL season. The stadium has a 25,500 capacity including a safe standing section. Prior to this the team played the 2016 season at Camping World Stadium.

On April 23, 2016, the Pride set a new NWSL attendance record, achieving a crowd of 23,403 during the Pride's inaugural home game, a 3–1 victory over the Houston Dash at Camping World Stadium. The record stood for over three years before Portland Thorns attracted a post–World Cup attendance of 25,218 in the newly expanded Providence Park in August 2019.

== Players ==
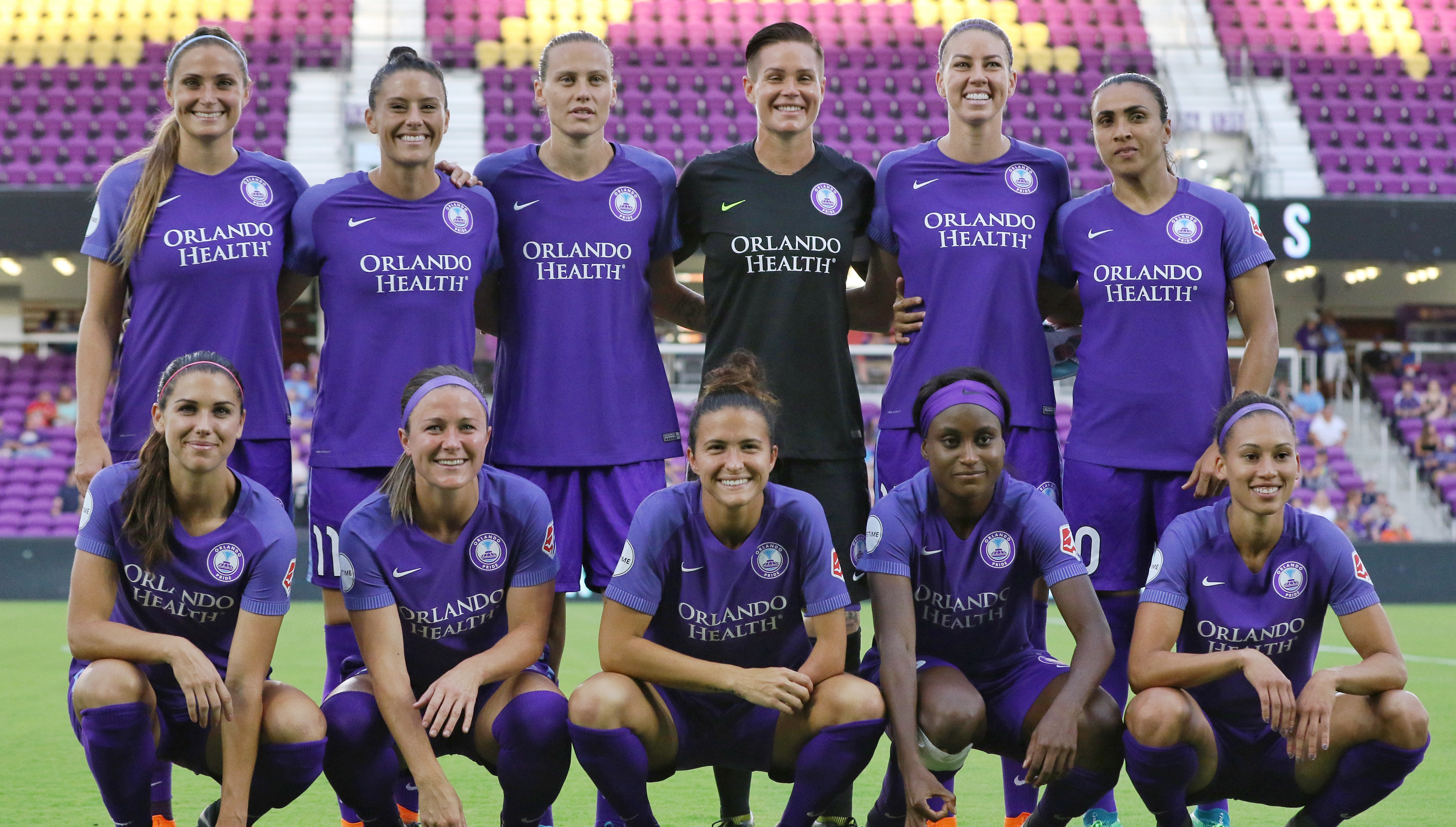
Orlando Pride in May 2018

=== Roster ===
As of November 22, 2026

Note: Flags indicate national team as defined under FIFA eligibility rules. Players may hold more than one non-FIFA nationality.

No.	Pos.	Nation	Player
2	DF	USA	Haley McCutcheon
3	DF	USA	Kylie Nadaner
5	DF	USA	Hailie Mace
6	MF	USA	Ally Lemos
7	MF	BRA	Angelina
10	FW	BRA	Marta (captain)
11	FW	ZAM	Barbra Banda
12	DF	USA	Cori Dyke
13	MF	MEX	Lizbeth Ovalle
16	DF	CAN	Zara Chavoshi
21	DF	ESP	Oihane Hernández
22	FW	NOR	Sanne Lekven
28	FW	USA	Summer Yates
29	FW	JAM	Solai Washington
31	GK	USA	Cara Martin
33	MF	USA	Zoe Matthews
40	GK	USA	McKinley Crone
41	DF	USA	Hannah Anderson
77	GK	USA	Cosette Morché

==== Out on loan ====
No.	Pos.	Nation	Player
1	GK	ENG	Anna Moorhouse (on loan to Manchester City until January 31, 2027)
30	FW	USA	Seven Castain (on loan to Dallas Trinity FC until December 31, 2026)
80	FW	USA	Simone Jackson (on loan to FC Rosengård until June 30, 2027)

== Staff ==
As of March 28, 2026.

Executive
Majority owner and chairman	(United States) Mark Wilf
Majority owner and vice-chair	(United States) Zygi Wilf
Majority owner and vice-chair	(United States) Leonard Wilf
President of business operations	(United States) Jarrod Dillon
VP of Soccer Operations & General manager	Caitlin Carducci
Coaching staff
Head coach	(England) Seb Hines
Assistant coach	(Jamaica) Giles Barnes
Assistant coach	(Sweden) Yolanda Thomas
Goalkeeper coach	(England) Paul Crichton
Player development coach	(England) Scott Sutter
Head of performance	(United States) Christi Edson

== Honors ==
- NWSL Championship
  - Winners (1): 2024
- NWSL Shield
  - Winners (1): 2024

== Records ==
=== Year-by-year ===
Seasonal statistics for the Orlando Pride
Season	NWSL regular season							Position	Playoffs	Summer Cup	Challenge Cup	CONCACAF W Champions Cup	Top scorer		Avg. attendance
Season	P	W	D	L	GF	GA	Pts	Position	Playoffs	Summer Cup	Challenge Cup	CONCACAF W Champions Cup	Player	Goals	Avg. attendance
2021	24	7	7	10	27	32	28	8th	DNQ	NH	NH	Group stage	(United States) Sydney Leroux	9	4,227
2022	22	5	7	10	22	45	22	10th	DNQ	NH	NH	Group stage	(United States) Darian Jenkins (Iceland) Gunnhildur Jónsdóttir	4	4,385
2023	22	10	1	11	27	28	31	7th	DNQ	NH	NH	Group stage	(United States) Messiah Bright	7	5,504
2024	26	18	6	2	46	20	60	1st	W	Group stage	DNQ	NH	(Zambia) Barbra Banda	17	8,340
2025	26	11	7	8	33	27	40	4th	SF	NH	RU	Group stage	(Zambia) Barbra Banda	8	9,623
2026	27	10	3	14	35	42	33	11th	TBD	NH	DNQ	DNQ	(Zambia) Barbra Banda	17	

Notes

1. Goals scored in all competitions
2. Goals scored in Fall Series

=== Head coaches ===
As of Match played on May 2, 2026

All-time Orlando Pride coaching stats
Name	Nationality	From	To	P	W	D	L	GF	GA	Win% (Note: Win% is rounded to two decimal places)
Tom Sermanni	Scotland	October 20, 2015	September 14, 2018	69	25	14	30	96	102	36.23
Marc Skinner	England	January 14, 2019	July 23, 2021	43	9	12	22	46	77	20.93
Carl Green (interim)	England	July 23, 2021	July 24, 2021	1	0	0	1	0	2	0.00
Becky Burleigh (interim)	United States	July 25, 2021	October 30, 2021	12	3	3	6	13	17	25.00
Amanda Cromwell	United States	December 7, 2021	October 10, 2022 (Note: Suspended from June 7, 2022)	13	2	4	7	13	28	15.38
Seb Hines	England	June 7, 2022 (Note: Interim from June 7, 2022 until November 11, 2022)	August 31, 2026	118	51	29	38	164	144	43.22
Yolanda Thomas	Sweden	August 31, 2026	present	0	0	0	0	0	0	—
Total				256	90	62	104	332	370	35.16

== Broadcasting ==
In 2016, games were broadcast locally on the Bright House Sports Network. In April of the same year, a livestream of a Pride match simulcast on the Facebook page of Alex Morgan had a live audience of 489,999 during the first half. It was the first professional sports broadcast on the social networking website.

For the 2017 season, Orlando Pride games were streamed exclusively by Go90 for American audiences and via the NWSL website for international viewers. As part of a three-year agreement with A&E Networks, Lifetime broadcasts one NWSL Game of the Week on Saturday afternoons. The Pride were featured in the nationally televised Game of the Week on seven occasions. The deal was mutually terminated a year early at the end of the 2018 season.

In 2019, NWSL regular season matches were streamed on Yahoo! Sports for the domestic audience while international fans continued to have access to games for free via the NWSL app and at NWSLsoccer.com. However, on July 4, 2019, NWSL announced it had signed a deal through the second half of the 2019 season with ESPN on the back of the USWNT's World Cup victory. The new deal meant ESPN would televise 11 regular season matches including two Pride games (July 14 and September 11) as well as every playoff game. The sudden switch and lack of information surrounding the international broadcasts led to widespread confusion as ESPN's subscription service ESPN Player took control in Europe, Africa and parts of Asia while Canada's rights were acquired by TSN.

For the 2020 season, the NWSL announced a three-year broadcast deal with CBS Sports and streaming service Twitch. In total, 87 NWSL matches will be shown across the main CBS network, CBS Sports Network, and CBS All Access live-streaming service with 14 of those games televised while Twitch will offer free coverage of 24 selected matches during the 2020 NWSL regular season. Twitch will also serve as the NWSL's exclusive international media rights partner outside the United States in 2020 with all 108 regular-season matches, the playoffs, and Championship available to global viewers.

== See also ==
- List of top-division football clubs in CONCACAF countries
- List of professional sports teams in the United States and Canada
