= List of Angel City FC players =

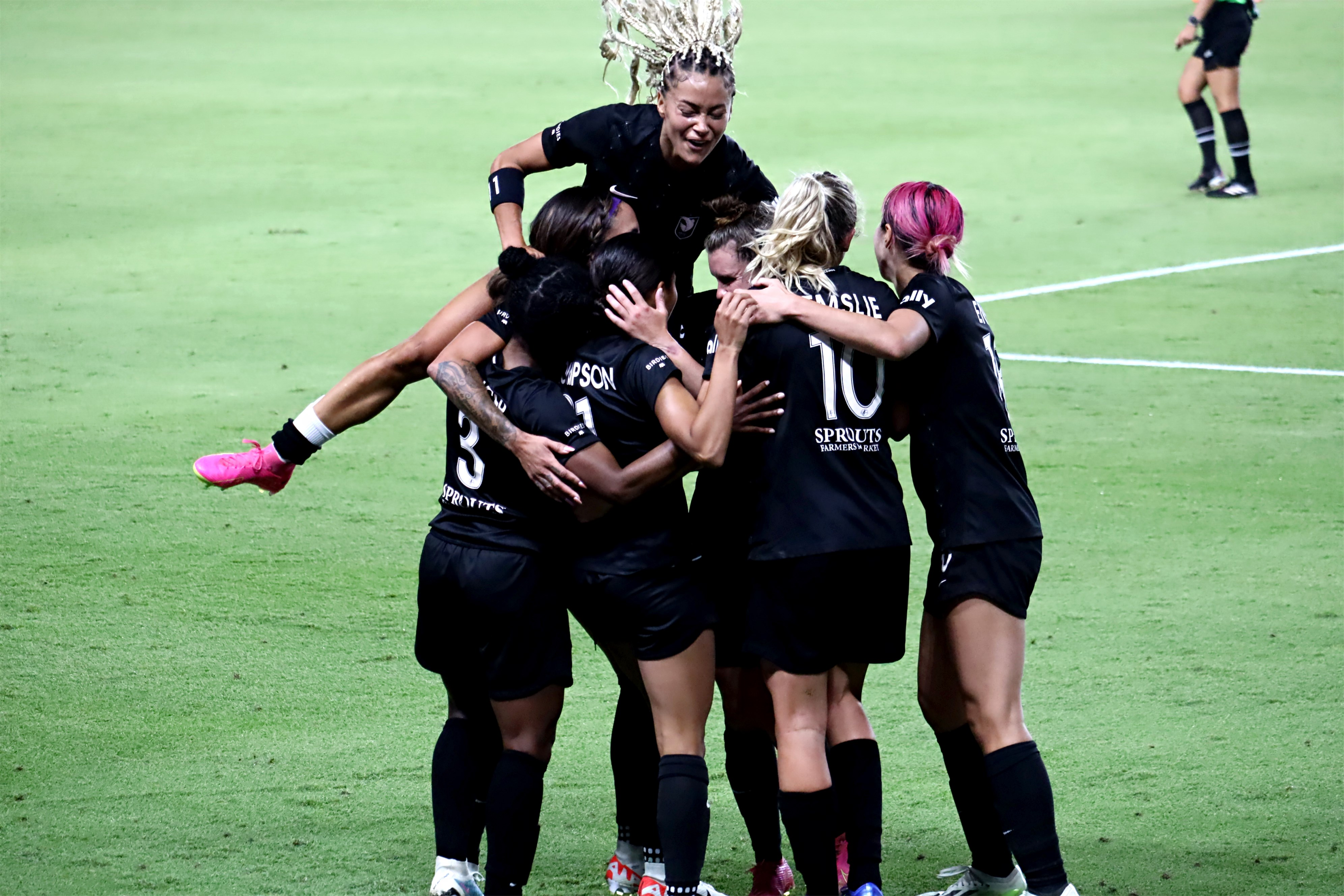
Angel City FC players celebrate after scoring a goal against the Houston Dash on October 8, 2023.

Angel City FC is an American professional women's soccer club which began play in the National Women's Soccer League (NWSL) in 2022 as an expansion team. All rostered players during the NWSL season, including the playoffs, Challenge Cup, and NWSL x Liga MX Femenil Summer Cup, even if they did not make an appearance, are listed below.

== Key ==
- The list is ordered alphabetically.
- Appearances as a substitute are included.
- Statistics are correct as of November 2, 2025, the end of the 2025 NWSL season, and are updated once a year after the conclusion of the NWSL season.
- Players whose names are highlighted in **bold** were active players on the Angel City roster as of the list's most recent update.

Positions key
GK	Goalkeeper
DF	Defender
MF	Midfielder
FW	Forward

Nationality
Unless otherwise noted, the nationality of a player is determined by the country they most recently represented in international play, or if said player has not played international football then by their country of birth.
Position
Playing positions are listed according to the player's roster designation as of the list's most recent update.
Years
Years are defined as the first and last calendar years in which the player was rostered for the club in any of the competitions listed below.
Appearances and goals
This list counts appearances and goals in the National Women's Soccer League, NWSL Playoffs, NWSL Challenge Cup, and NWSL x Liga MX Femenil Summer Cup.

== Players ==
Yrs	No.	Pos	Nat	Player	Total		NWSL		Playoffs		Cup (Note: Includes the NWSL Challenge Cup)		Other (Note: Includes the NWSL x Liga MX Femenil Summer Cup)	
Yrs	No.	Pos	Nat	Player	Apps	Goals	Apps	Goals	Apps	Goals	Apps	Goals	Apps	Goals
2023–	19	GK	(United States) USA	Angelina Anderson	33	0	29	0	1	0	1	0	2	0
2022	26	MF	(United States) USA	Hope Breslin	13	0	8	0	0	0	5	0	0	0
2024	24	FW	(United States) USA	Messiah Bright	25	1	21	1	0	0	0	0	4	0
2023	15	FW	(Mexico) MEX	Scarlett Camberos	26	2	19	1	1	0	6	1	0	0
2022–2023	7	FW	(United States) USA	Simone Charley	25	3	22	2	0	0	3	1	0	0
2025–	24	FW	(Zambia) ZAM	Prisca Chilufya	3	0	3	0	0	0	0	0	0	0
2022	19	MF	(United States) USA	Katie Cousins	1	0	1	0	0	0	0	0	0	0
2024	27	DF	(United States) USA	Madison Curry	26	1	22	1	0	0	0	0	4	0
2025–	30	DF	(Germany) GER	Sara Doorsoun	8	0	8	0	0	0	0	0	0	0
2024	8	MF	(United States) USA	Meggie Dougherty Howard	22	1	18	1	0	0	0	0	4	0
2025	7	FW	(France) FRA	Julie Dufour	10	0	10	0	0	0	0	0	0	0
2023–2025	44	MF	(United States) USA	Elizabeth Eddy	11	0	6	0	0	0	3	0	2	0
2022–	10	FW	(Scotland) SCO	Claire Emslie	72	15	63	13	1	0	5	1	3	1
2022–	18	FW	(Japan) JPN	Jun Endō	57	4	49	4	1	0	7	0	0	0
2023	8	MF	(United States) USA	Julie Ertz	8	1	7	1	0	0	1	0	0	0
2022	21	MF	(Brazil) BRA	Stefany Ferrer Van Ginkel	4	0	2	0	0	0	2	0	0	0
2025–	17	MF	(United States) USA	Kennedy Fuller	49	6	45	5	0	0	0	0	4	1
2022–2025	4	DF	(Canada) CAN	Vanessa Gilles (Note: Gilles scored Angel City's first-ever NWSL regular season goal, which came against the North Carolina Courage on April 30, 2022.)	13	1	7	1	0	0	6	0	0	0
2022–	11	DF	(United States) USA	Sarah Gorden	82	0	72	0	1	0	5	0	4	0
2022–2025	99	MF	(United States) USA	Madison Hammond	89	2	72	1	1	0	12	1	4	0
2022–2024	13	GK	(Bosnia and Herzegovina) BIH	DiDi Haračić	71	0	62	0	0	0	7	0	2	0
2023–2024	26	MF	(France) FRA	Amandine Henry	10	0	9	0	1	0	0	0	0	0
2023	36	DF	(United States) USA	Kelsey Hill	3	0	0	0	0	0	3	0	0	0
2025–	8	MF	(United States) USA	Macey Hodge	16	1	16	1	0	0	0	0	0	0
2022–2023	1	GK	(United States) USA	Brittany Isenhour	4	0	0	0	0	0	4	0	0	0
2023–2024	33	FW	(Mexico) MEX	Katie Johnson	31	3	23	3	1	0	6	0	1	0
2025	26	DF	(United States) USA	Hannah Johnson	1	0	1	0	0	0	0	0	0	0
2025–	32	FW	(Iceland) ISL	Sveindís Jane Jónsdóttir	13	1	13	1	0	0	0	0	0	0
2025	14	DF	(Australia) AUS	Alanna Kennedy	16	1	16	1	0	0	0	0	0	0
2025–	3	DF	(United States) USA	Savy King	8	0	8	0	0	0	0	0	0	0
2022–2024	29	MF	(France) FRA	Clarisse Le Bihan	54	2	46	2	1	0	6	0	1	0
2022–	2	FW	(United States) USA	Sydney Leroux	43	10	41	9	1	0	0	0	1	1
2025–	27	FW	(Colombia) COL	Maithé López	0	0	0	0	0	0	0	0	0	0
2022	20	FW	(United States) USA	Tyler Lussi	26	1	20	0	0	0	6	1	0	0
2025–	14	MF	(United States) USA	Nealy Martin	7	0	7	0	0	0	0	0	0	0
2023–2024	12	DF	(United States) USA	Merritt Mathias	14	0	13	0	0	0	0	0	1	0
2025–	25	DF	(United States) USA	Sophia Mattice	3	0	3	0	0	0	0	0	0	0
2022–2023	9	MF	(United States) USA	Savannah McCaskill (Note: McCaskill scored Angel City's first-ever goal, which came in the NWSL Challenge Cup against San Diego Wave FC on March 19, 2025.)	54	14	43	11	1	0	10	3	0	0
2025–	29	DF	(Japan) JPN	Miyabi Moriya	25	1	25	1	0	0	0	0	0	0
2022–	28	MF	(United States) USA	Lily Nabet	47	0	35	0	0	0	9	0	3	0
2025–	12	MF	(Brazil) BRA	Maiara Niehues	14	2	14	2	0	0	0	0	0	0
2022–2024	14	DF	(United States) USA	Paige Nielsen	50	1	43	1	1	0	6	0	0	0
2025	25	GK	(United States) USA	Breanna Norris	0	0	0	0	0	0	0	0	0	0
2022	24	GK	(United States) USA	Maia Pérez	0	0	0	0	0	0	0	0	0	0
2024–	9	FW	(South Korea) KOR	Casey Phair	6	0	5	0	0	0	0	0	1	0
2023	24	MF	(United States) USA	Mackenzie Pluck	6	0	1	0	0	0	5	0	0	0
2022–2025	23	FW	(United States) USA	Christen Press (Note: Press was Angel City's inaugural signing, announced on August 23, 2021.)	46	6	39	4	0	0	5	2	2	0
2022–	6	DF	(Canada) CAN	Megan Reid	84	0	72	0	0	0	8	0	4	0
2022–2025	5	DF	(New Zealand) NZL	Ali Riley	56	3	45	3	1	0	10	0	0	0
2022	8	MF	(United States) USA	Cari Roccaro	27	4	21	4	0	0	6	0	0	0
2024	7	MF	(Costa Rica) CRC	Rocky Rodríguez	23	1	20	1	0	0	0	0	3	0
2023	39	GK	(Germany) GER	Almuth Schult	1	0	1	0	0	0	0	0	0	0
2025–	13	GK	(United States) USA	Hannah Seabert	4	0	4	0	0	0	0	0	0	0
2025–	15	MF	(United States) USA	Evelyn Shores	12	1	12	1	0	0	0	0	0	0
2022–2024	3	DF	(United States) USA	Jasmyne Spencer	73	1	56	1	1	0	12	0	4	0
2024–	1	GK	(Japan) JPN	Hannah Stambaugh	0	0	0	0	0	0	0	0	0	0
2025–	7	MF	(Japan) JPN	Hina Sugita	4	0	4	0	0	0	0	0	0	0
2022–2023	25	DF	(Jamaica) JAM	Allyson Swaby	4	0	2	0	0	0	2	0	0	0
2022	35	MF	(England) ENG	Miri Taylor	12	0	11	0	0	0	1	0	0	0
2023–2025	21	FW	(United States) USA	Alyssa Thompson	69	15	62	15	1	0	2	0	4	0
2024–	20	DF	(United States) USA	Gisele Thompson	39	1	38	1	0	0	0	0	1	0
2025–	33	FW	(United States) USA	Riley Tiernan	26	8	26	8	0	0	0	0	0	0
2022–2025	16	DF	(United States) USA	M.A. Vignola	64	5	57	5	1	0	3	0	3	0
2022–2023	17	MF	(United States) USA	Dani Weatherholt	53	0	41	0	0	0	12	0	0	0
2024–2025	4	MF	(England) ENG	Katie Zelem	25	2	25	2	0	0	0	0	0	0

== By nationality ==
In total, 65 players representing 18 different countries have played for Angel City FC.

Note: Countries indicate national team as defined under FIFA eligibility rules. Players may hold more than one non-FIFA nationality.

Country	Total players
Australia	1
Bosnia and Herzegovina	1
Brazil	2
Canada	2
Colombia	1
Costa Rica	1
England	2
France	3
Germany	2
Iceland	1
Jamaica	1
Japan	4
Mexico	2
New Zealand	1
Scotland	1
South Korea	1
United States	38
Zambia	1

== See also ==
- 2022 NWSL Expansion Draft
- List of top-division football clubs in CONCACAF countries
- List of professional sports teams in the United States and Canada
