= 2025 Angel City FC season =

Angel City FC
2025 season
- Owners: List of Angel City FC owners
- Sporting director: Mark Parsons
- Head coach: Sam Laity (interim, January 22–June 1); Alexander Straus (from June 1)
- Stadium: BMO Stadium (capacity: 22,000)
- League: 11th
- Top goalscorer: League: Riley Tiernan (8); All: Riley Tiernan (8)
- Highest home attendance: 19,728 v San Diego Wave FC (March 16, 2025, National Women's Soccer League)
- Lowest home attendance: 11,147 v Kansas City Current (October 6, 2025, National Women's Soccer League)
- Biggest win: 3–1 v Houston Dash (Away, April 12, 2025, National Women's Soccer League); 2–0 v Utah Royals (Home, May 9, 2025, National Women's Soccer League); 2–0 v Houston Dash (Home, October 12, 2025, National Women's Soccer League)
- Biggest defeat: 0–4 v NJ/NY Gotham FC (Home, April 18, 2025, National Women's Soccer League)
Home colors	Away colors
- All statistics correct as of November 2, 2025.

The 2025 Angel City FC season is the team's fourth season as a professional women's soccer team. Angel City FC plays in the National Women's Soccer League (NWSL), the top tier of women's soccer in the United States.

== Background ==
=== Coaching changes ===
After a disappointing 2024 season where Angel City ending up ranking 12th out of 14 clubs, failing to reach the NWSL playoffs, on December 5, 2024, Angel City announced that they had mutually agreed to part ways with General Manager, Angela Hucles, who had first joined the club as VP of Player Development in 2021. Assistant General Manager, Matt Wade, assumed the role of interim General Manager while the club conducts a comprehensive search for a new General Manager.

Following the departure of Hucles, Angel City then announced the departure of Head Coach Becki Tweed on December 9, 2024. Assistant Coach Eleri Earnshaw will act as interim head coach while the search of a new coach begins. Angel City later announced the departure of Goalkeeping coach Omar Zeenni via social media on December 16, 2024.

Mark Parsons was announced as the club's new Sporting Director on January 15, 2025. Parsons will oversee all soccer operations, including the technical staff, the scouting and analytics department, sports medical, performance, nutrition, and player care. On January 22, 2025, the official preseason roster was announced along with the announcement that Sam Laity was appointed as the new interim Head Coach and Ludovic Antunes as the interim Goalkeeping Coach.

On April 18, 2025, it was announced that Alexander Straus had been appointed as permanent head coach. He joined the club on June 1 following the conclusion of the 2024–25 season with Bayern Munich.

== Summary ==
=== Preseason ===
After the conclusion of the 2024 season, on November 18, 2024, Angel City announced they would be moving into a newly renovated performance facility at California Lutheran University. The performance center, formerly used by the Los Angeles Rams of the NFL, offers a full-size pitch and a half and approximately 50,000 square feet of indoor space, the largest dedicated solely to NWSL club. The performance center will serve as the home of Angel City players and first-team staff for up to four years and would be completed ahead of the 2025 preseason.

On November 19, 2024, announced NYX Professional Makeup as a new multi-year sleeve sponsor for the 2025 season, NYX is the first makeup brand to invest in a soccer team.

On November 22, 2024, Angel City announced they had signed Scottish forward Claire Emslie to a new contract to keep her with Angel City until 2026.

On December 4, 2024, rookie defender Madison Curry announced she would not be re-signing with Angel City and would instead sign with Seattle Reign FC as a free agent. Later that day, Angel City announced the contract extension of Japanese goalkeeper Hannah Stambaugh for the 2025 season.

On December 5, 2024, Angel City announced that they had mutually agreed to part ways with General Manager Angela Hucles Mangano who had first joined the club as VP of Player Development in 2021. Assistant General Manager Matt Wade will assume the role of interim General Manager while the club conducts a comprehensive search for a new GM. Following the departure of Hucles, Angel City then announced the departure of Head Coach Becki Tweed on December 9, 2024. Tweed finished her time at Angel City with 17 wins, 13 draws, 17 loss across all competitions with a win rate of 36.17%. Assistant Coach Eleri Earnshaw will act as interim head coach while the search of a new coach begins.

At the conclusion of the 2024 season, on December 10, 2024, Angel City announced their end-of-season roster, they announced they will not be renewing the contract of goalkeeper DiDi Haračić and defender Jasmyne Spencer, who have been with the club since its inaugural season in 2022, as well as midfielder Meggie Dougherty Howard and forward Katie Johnson, who would later announce her retirement from professional soccer on December 20, 2024.

On December 16, 2024, M.A. Vignola announced she would be re-signing a new two-year contract with Angel City, keeping her at the club until 2026.

On December 17, 2024, Angel City announced they had acquired French forward Julie Dufour from Paris FC and signed her on a three-year contract beginning in January 2025. Dufour will occupy one of Angel City's international roster spots when she joins the club.

On December 20, 2024, Angel City announced they would be trading Costa Rican midfielder Rocky Rodríguez to Kansas City Current in exchange for $100,000 in intra-league transfer funds. Later that day, Mexican forward Katie Johnson, whose contract was not renewed with Angel City, also announced her retirement from professional soccer.

On December 23, 2024, Angel City announced they had signed midfielder Macey Hodge on a two-year contract through 2026 with a club option for 2027. Hodge previously played for the Mississippi State Bulldogs, and made 97 appearances over 5 years.

Two Angel City players, Alyssa Thompson and Angelina Anderson were named to the USWNT's January training camp on January 7, 2025. This was Anderson's first call up to the United States senior team. Gisele Thompson was later called up to the first ever USWNT futures camp which will run concurrently with the senior teams training camp.

Mark Parsons was announced as the club's new Sporting Director on January 15, 2025. Parsons will oversee all soccer operations, including the technical staff, the scouting and analytics department, sports medical, performance, nutrition, and player care. Parsons teased Christen Press' one-year contract renewal which was announced a few days later on January 17, 2025.

Australian defender Alanna Kennedy announced her departure from Manchester City on January 21, 2025, and it was subsequently reported that she would be signing with Angel City on a one-year contract with a mutual option for 2026. Later that day the new performance center was unveiled ahead of the start of preseason the following day. On January 22, 2025 the official preseason roster was announced along with the announcement that Sam Laity was appointed as the new interim Head Coach and Ludovic Antunes as the interim Goalkeeping Coach.

On January 29, 2025, it was announced that Alyssa and Gisele Thompson had both signed contract extensions keeping them at Angel City until 2028. On January 31, 2025, Angel City announced they had acquired Japanese defender Miyabi Moriya from INAC Kobe Leonessa for an undisclosed fee. Moriya will occupy an International Roster spot and signed a one-year contract with a club option for 2026. The following week on February 3, 2025, Angel City announced they had acquired Los Angeles-born defender Savy King from Bay FC, in exchange for $200,000 in intra-league transfer funds plus $100,000 in 2026. Four days later, the club announced that Angelina Anderson had also signed an extension until 2028.

Ahead of the International Break, both Thompson sisters were called up by Emma Hayes to represent the United States at the 2025 SheBelieves Cup, becoming the third sisters to make the same roster. Savy King also received a call-up as a training player. New signings Alanna Kennedy and Miyabi Moriya were also called up for Japan and Australia for the SheBelieves Cup, Maithe López also received a call up as training player for Colombia. Megan Reid was called up by newly appointed Canadian coach Casey Stoney to represent Canada at the 2025 Pinatar Cup. Claire Emslie was called-up to represent Scotland for UEFA Nations League matches against Austria and Netherlands.

After playing a closed door match against Bay FC, Angel City played their first public preseason match at the Coachella Invitational at the Empire Polo Fields on February 16, 2025 against Portland Thorns FC. After conceding first in the 57th minute, Lily Nabet scored her first Angel City goal off a corner kick from new signing Julie Dufour to tie the match, and U18-trialist Scottie Antonucci scored the match winner in stoppage time to finish the match as a 2–1 victory. After the conclusion of the match the players called-up for International Duty departed.

Gisele Thompson made her senior-team debut on February 20, 2025 in the first match against Colombia. Both Alyssa and Gisele started the following match against Australia and Alanna Kennedy on February 23, 2025, becoming the second sisters to start in a senior-team match for the United States. On February 25, 2025, Megan Reid scored her first international goal for Canada in a 7-0 victory over Chinese Taipei in the 2025 Pinatar Cup which was eventually won by Canada. On February 26, 2025, the United States were defeated by Japan in the final match of the 2025 SheBelievesCup, Alyssa Thompson played as a substitute against Angel City teammate Miyabi Moriya, who won the 2025 SheBelieves Cup with Japan.

With many key players out on International Duty for both teams, Angel City faced Seattle Reign FC in their second match of the Coachella Invitational on February 22, 2025, which finished as a 1–1 draw after Casey Phair scored her first goal with Angel City from a header to tie the match and finish the Coachella Invitational undefeated.

== Stadium and facilities ==
Angel City FC continued to play in BMO Stadium, their home since the team's inaugural season in 2022.

On November 18, 2024, Angel City announced they would be moving into a newly renovated performance facility at California Lutheran University. The performance center, formerly used by the Los Angeles Rams of the NFL, offers a full-size pitch and a half and approximately 50,000 square feet of indoor space, the largest dedicated solely to NWSL club. The performance center will serve as the home of Angel City players and first-team staff for up to four years and would be completed ahead of the 2025 preseason. The performance center was officially unveiled on January 21, 2025 ahead of the preseason.

The center features a 5,400-square-foot gym, custom lockers for players, coaches, staff, and a dedicated locker room for players under 18, a new hydrotherapy area including cold and hot plunge pools and saunas, a private outdoor relaxation lounge, a 3,400-square-foot medical treatment and rehabilitation area, a private recovery room, private doctor's office and medical staff offices, Custom pre- and post-training nutrition and supplement area to provide elevated nutrition area for athletes to fuel with fresh, nutritious meals prepared onsite, children's playroom to support the families of our players and staff, a 930-square-foot team meeting and film room, coaching and peraformance offices for soccer operations staff, and a fit-for-purpose studio onsite for content capture and interviews.

== Team ==
=== Current staff ===
As of August 1, 2025.

Executive
President	Julie Uhrman
Sporting Director	Mark Parsons
Assistant General Manager	Matt Wade
Coaching
Head Coach	Alexander Straus
Senior Assistant Coach	Sam Laity
Senior Assistant Coach	Eleri Earnshaw
Goalkeeping Coach	Kevin Moreno
Technical Assistant Coach	Mykell Bates
Performance Analyst	Oliver Blitz
Technical Staff
Technical Director	Mark Wilson
Senior Director of Soccer Operations	Marisa Leconte
Director of Player Care	Chelsea Rodriguez
Soccer Operations Coordinator	Alrick Drummond
Head Equipment Manager	Brock Chartier
Director of Medical and Performance	Sarah Smith
Head of Sports Science	Dan Jones
Physical Performance Coach	Michael Roman
Head Athletic Trainer	Manny De Alba
Director of Rehabilitation	Sarah Neal
Assistant Athletic Trainer	April Seymon
Physical Therapist	Joscelyn Shumate Bourne

=== Squad ===
As of October 10, 2025.

No.	Nat.	Name	Date of birth (age)	Since	Previous team	Notes
Goalkeepers
1	(Japan)	Hannah Stambaugh	December 24, 1998 (age 27)	2024	(Japan) Omiya Ardija Ventus	
13	(United States)	Hannah Seabert	February 27, 1995 (age 31)	2025	(Portugal) Sporting CP	
19	(United States)	Angelina Anderson (Vice Captain)	March 22, 2001 (age 25)	2023	(United States) University of California-Berkeley	
Defenders
3	(United States)	Savy King	February 5, 2005 (age 21)	2025	(United States) Bay FC	
5	(New Zealand)	Ali Riley (Club Captain)	October 30, 1987 (age 38)	2022	(United States) Orlando Pride	
6	(Canada)	Megan Reid	July 9, 1996 (age 30)	2022	(United States) Lamorinda United	
11	(United States)	Sarah Gorden (Captain)	September 13, 1992 (age 33)	2021	(United States) Chicago Red Stars	
20	(United States)	Gisele Thompson	December 5, 2005 (age 20)	2024	(United States) Total Futbol Academy	
25	(United States)	Sophia Mattice	June 25, 2002 (age 24)	2025	(United States) Kentucky Wildcats	
29	(Japan)	Miyabi Moriya	August 22, 1996 (age 29)	2025	(Japan) INAC Kobe Leonessa	INT
30	(Germany)	Sara Doorsoun	November 17, 1991 (age 34)	2025	(Germany) Eintracht Frankfurt	INT
44	(United States)	Elizabeth Eddy	September 13, 1991 (age 34)	2023	(United States) Houston Dash	
Midfielders
7	(Japan)	Hina Sugita	January 31, 1997 (age 29)	2025	(United States) Portland Thorns FC	INT
8	(United States)	Macey Hodge	May 4, 2001 (age 25)	2024	(United States) Mississippi State	
12	(Brazil)	Maiara Niehues	August 11, 2004 (age 21)	2025	(Portugal) Sporting CP	INT
14	(United States)	Nealy Martin	April 22, 1998 (age 28)	2025	(United States) Gotham FC	
15	(United States)	Evelyn Shores	December 29, 2004 (age 21)	2025	(United States) North Carolina Tar Heels	
17	(United States)	Kennedy Fuller	March 9, 2007 (age 19)	2024	(United States) Solar FC	
28	(United States)	Lily Nabet	September 24, 1999 (age 26)	2022	(United States) Duke University	LOAN (Note: Loaned out to another team)
99	(United States)	Madison Hammond	November 15, 1997 (age 28)	2022	(United States) OL Reign	
Forwards
2	(United States)	Sydney Leroux	May 7, 1990 (age 36)	2022	(United States) Orlando Pride	
9	(South Korea)	Casey Phair	June 29, 2007 (age 19)	2024	(United States) Players Development Academy	U18; LOAN
10	(Scotland)	Claire Emslie	March 8, 1994 (age 32)	2022	(United States) Orlando Pride	
18	(Japan)	Jun Endo	May 24, 2000 (age 26)	2021	(Japan) Tokyo Verdy Beleza	INT
23	(United States)	Christen Press	December 29, 1988 (age 37)	2021	(England) Manchester United (via Racing Louisville FC)	
24	(Zambia)	Prisca Chilufya	June 8, 1999 (age 27)	2025	(United States) Orlando Pride	INT
27	(Colombia)	Maithé López	January 24, 2007 (age 19)	2025	(Colombia) Real Santander	INT
32	(Iceland)	Sveindís Jane Jónsdóttir	June 5, 2001 (age 25)	2025	(Germany) VfL Wolfsburg	INT
33	(United States)	Riley Tiernan	November 14, 2002 (age 23)	2025	(United States) Rutgers Scarlet Knights	

== Competitions ==
Win Draw Loss

=== Preseason ===
==== Coachella Valley Invitational ====
February 16, 2025 1	Angel City FC	2–1	Portland Thorns FC	Indio, California
11:00 a.m. PDT (UTC-7)	Nabet 67'; Antonucci 90+3'	Report	or: Linnehan 57'	Stadium: Empire Polo Club

February 22, 2025 2	Angel City FC	1–1	Seattle Reign FC	Indio, California
12:00 p.m. PDT (UTC-7)	Phair 86'	Report	Dahlien 25'	Stadium: Empire Polo Club

=== Regular season ===
All matches are in Pacific time

==== Matches ====
March 16, 2025 1	Angel City FC	1–1	San Diego Wave FC	Los Angeles, California
3:50 p.m. PDT (UTC-7)	Hodge (yellow card) 10'; Vignola (yellow card) 30'; A. Thompson 54' (Fuller); Moriya (yellow card) 80'	Report	Wesley (yellow card) 3'; Corley 5' (Cascarino), (yellow card) 24'; Sanchez (yellow card) 40'	Stadium: BMO Stadium; Attendance: 19,728; Referee: Ekaterina Koroleva

March 21, 2025 2	Portland Thorns	1–1	Angel City FC	Portland, Oregon
7:00 p.m. PDT (UTC-7)	Turner 30'; Torpey (yellow card) 69'	Report	Fuller 9' (G. Thompson); King (yellow card) 90+1'	Stadium: Providence Park; Attendance: 15,839; Referee: Greg Dopka

March 30, 2025 3	Angel City FC	2–1	Seattle Reign FC	Los Angeles, California
5:00 p.m. PDT (UTC-7)	A. Thompson 8' (Fuller), (yellow card) 89'; Tiernan 63' (Emslie)	Report	Ji 12' (pen.); Mondésir (yellow card) 63'; Dahlien (yellow card) 90+2'	Stadium: BMO Stadium; Attendance: 15,384; Referee: Gerald Flores

April 12, 2025 4	Houston Dash	1–3	Angel City FC	Houston, Texas
2:00 p.m. PDT (UTC-7)	Olivieri 61' (Ryan); Bright (yellow card) 90'	Report	Hodge 13', (yellow card) 52'; Tiernan 29' (A. Thompson), (yellow card) 72'; A. Thompson 86' (Tiernan)	Stadium: Shell Energy Stadium; Attendance: 5,263; Referee: Jaclyn Metz

April 18, 2025 5	Angel City FC	0–4	NJ/NY Gotham FC	Los Angeles, California
7:30 p.m. PDT (UTC-7)	Hodge (yellow card) 32'	Report	González 18' (Portilho), 75' (Schupansky); Portilho (yellow card) 58'; Moriya 67' (o.g.); Torres (yellow card) 81'; Geyse 85'	Stadium: BMO Stadium; Attendance: 18,465; Referee: Danielle Chesky

April 25, 2025 6	Orlando Pride	3–2	Angel City FC	Orlando, Florida
5:00 p.m. PDT (UTC-7)	Lemos (yellow card) 29'; Banda (yellow card) 45+4', (goal) 76' (Pickett); Marta 71'; Vignola 90+3' (o.g.)	Report	Tiernan 9' (Fuller), (yellow card) 45+5'; Zelem 44'	Stadium: Inter&Co Stadium; Attendance: 6,665; Referee: Matthew Thompson

May 2, 2025 7	Washington Spirit	3–4	Angel City FC	Washington D.C.
5:00 p.m. PDT (UTC-7)	Morgan 30' (Hatch), 89'; Monday (yellow card) 35', (goal) 40' (Kouassi)	Report	Tiernan 8' (Vignola), 90+8'; G. Thompson 22' (A. Thompson); Fuller (yellow card) 24'; Zelem 72' (G. Thompson); King (yellow card) 84'; Laity (red card) 90+9'	Stadium: Audi Field; Attendance: 13,738; Referee: Shawn Tehini

May 9, 2025 8	Angel City FC	2–0	Utah Royals	Los Angeles, California
7:30 p.m. PDT (UTC-7)	G. Thompson (yellow card) 11'; Zelem (yellow card) 47'; A. Thompson (yellow card) 51', (goal) 90+7'; Press 66' (Kennedy)	Report		Stadium: BMO Stadium; Attendance: 16,533; Referee: Alex Billeter

May 17, 2025 9	Bay FC	2–0	Angel City FC	San Jose, California
7:00 p.m. PDT (UTC-7)	Hocking 23' (Huff); Conti 28' (pen.); Kundananji (yellow card) 33'; Menges (yellow card) 45+4'; Bailey (yellow card) 53'; Silkowitz (yellow card) 72'	Report	Reid (yellow card) 13'	Stadium: PayPal Park; Referee: Brandon Stevis

May 24, 2025 10	Angel City FC	2–3	Racing Louisville FC	Los Angeles, California
7:00 p.m. PDT (UTC-7)	Hodge (yellow card) 9'; Tiernan 48' (G. Thompson); A. Thompson 68' (pen.); Zelem (yellow card) 90+7'	Report	Flint (yellow card) 15', (goal) 23' (pen.); O'Kane (yellow card) 45+2'; Sears 53' (Wright); DeMelo 56' (Fischer); Fischer (red card) 67'	Stadium: BMO Stadium; Attendance: 16,740; Referee: Elvis Osmanovic

June 7, 2025 11	Angel City FC	2–2	Chicago Stars FC	Los Angeles, California
7:00 p.m. PDT (UTC-7)	Dufour (yellow card) 20'; Fuller 29'; Gorden (yellow card) 37'; Tiernan (yellow card) 43'; Vignola 80'	Report	Gomes 58'; Schlegel 66' (López)	Stadium: BMO Stadium; Attendance: 17,538; Referee: Brad Jensen

June 14, 2025 12	Angel City FC	1–2	North Carolina Courage	Los Angeles, California
7:00 p.m. PDT (UTC-7)	Tiernan 11' (G. Thompson)	Report	Vine 1' (Matsukubo); Matsukubo (yellow card) 45+3'; Betfort (yellow card) 89'; Pinto 90+5'	Stadium: BMO Stadium; Attendance: 14,933; Referee: Nabil Bensalah

June 20, 2025 13	Kansas City Current	1–0	Angel City FC	Kansas City, Missouri
5:00 p.m. PDT (UTC-7)	Zaneratto 69'; Prince (yellow card) 81'	Report	A. Thompson (penalty missed) 56'	Stadium: CPKC Stadium; Attendance: 11,500; Referee: Elton García

August 1, 2025 14	Seattle Reign FC	2–0	Angel City FC	Seattle, Washington
7:30 p.m. PDT (UTC-7)	Fishlock 66'; Kennedy 86' (o.g.)	Report		Stadium: Lumen Field; Attendance: 10,117; Referee: Shawn Tehini

August 9, 2025 15	San Diego Wave FC	1–1	Angel City FC	San Diego, California
7:00 p.m. PDT (UTC-7)	McCaskill (yellow card) 61'; Robbe 85'	Report	Kennedy 90+2' (Jónsdóttir); A. Thompson (yellow card) 90+4'	Stadium: Snapdragon Stadium; Attendance: 15,834; Referee: Abdou Ndiaye

August 15, 2025 16	Utah Royals	0–0	Angel City FC	Sandy, Utah
7:00 p.m. PDT (UTC-7)	Solórzano (yellow card) 59'; Zornoza (yellow card) 88'	Report	Hammond (yellow card) 67'	Stadium: America First Field; Attendance: 6,299; Referee: Alyssa Nichols

August 21, 2025 17	Angel City FC	1–0	Orlando Pride	Los Angeles, California
7:30 p.m. PDT (UTC-7)	A. Thompson 86'; Tiernan (yellow card) 90+6'	Report	Angelina (yellow card) 90+2'	Stadium: BMO Stadium; Attendance: 15,749; Referee: Cristian Campo Hernández

September 1, 2025 18	Angel City FC	2–1	Bay FC	Los Angeles, California
6:00 p.m. PDT (UTC-7)	Tiernan 12' (Vignola); Hodge (yellow card) 34'; Niehues 77' (Moriya)	Report	Hill 37'; Malonson (yellow card) 47'; Dydasco (yellow card) 50'	Stadium: BMO Stadium; Attendance: 14,971; Referee: Matthew Thompson

September 7, 2025 19	NJ/NY Gotham FC	3–1	Angel City FC	Harrison, New Jersey
2:00 p.m. PDT (UTC-7)	Portilho 47' (Purce); Lavelle 51'; Howell 68' (Geyse)	Report	Fuller 2'; Doorsoun (yellow card) 83'	Stadium: Sports Illustrated Stadium; Attendance: 8,890; Referee: Greg Dopka

September 13, 2025 20	North Carolina Courage	2–1	Angel City FC	Cary, North Carolina
9:30 a.m. PDT (UTC-7)	Matsukubo 6' (Linnehan); Pinto 19'; Lussi (yellow card) 45+4'; Jackson (yellow card) 86'	Report	Jónsdóttir 88' (Moriya)	Stadium: WakeMed Soccer Park; Attendance: 6,378; Referee: Alex Billeter

September 18, 2025 21	Angel City FC	2–2	Washington Spirit	Los Angeles, California
7:30 p.m. PDT (UTC-7)	Shores 14' (G. Thompson); Jónsdóttir (yellow card) 52'; McKeown 55' (o.g.); Gorden (yellow card) 84'	Report	Rodman (penalty missed) 12', 12'; Bethune 71' (Santos)	Stadium: BMO Stadium; Attendance: 15,033; Referee: Calin Radosav

September 27, 2025 22	Racing Louisville FC	1–0	Angel City FC	Louisville, Kentucky
4:30 p.m. PDT (UTC-7)	Flint (yellow card) 19'; Weber 66' (Sears)	Report	Martin (yellow card) 21'; Shores (yellow card) 29'; Niehues (yellow card) 45+2'; Hodge (yellow card) 80'	Stadium: Lynn Family Stadium; Attendance: 6,070; Referee: Shawn Tehini

October 6, 2025 23	Angel City FC	0–1	Kansas City Current	Los Angeles, California
7:30 p.m. PDT (UTC-7)		Report	Cooper 59' (Hopkins); Wheeler (yellow card) 88'	Stadium: BMO Stadium; Attendance: 11,147; Referee: Gerald Flores

October 12, 2025 24	Angel City FC	2–0	Houston Dash	Los Angeles, California
2:00 p.m. PDT (UTC-7)	Fuller 53'; Niehues 86' (Endō); Sugita (yellow card) 90+1'	Report	Alozie (yellow card) 37'; Patterson (yellow card) 45+1'	Stadium: BMO Stadium; Attendance: 15,274; Referee: Matthew Corrigan

October 19, 2025 25	Angel City FC	0–2	Portland Thorns	Los Angeles, California
2:00 p.m. PDT (UTC-7)	Niehues (yellow card) 72'	Report	Moultrie 23' (Spaanstra), 60' (pen.); Coffey (yellow card) 47'	Stadium: BMO Stadium; Attendance: 19,841; Referee: Jaclyn Metz

November 2, 2025 26	Chicago Stars FC	2–1	Angel City FC	Bridgeview, Illinois
2:15 p.m. PST (UTC-8)	Joseph 49'; Malham (yellow card) 56'; Schlegel 90+8'	Report	Moriya 23'; Niehues (yellow card) 30'	Stadium: SeatGeek Stadium; Attendance: 4,219; Referee: Lauren Aldrich

==== Regular season standings ====
Pos	Team	Pld	W	D	L	GF	GA	GD	Pts
9	North Carolina Courage	26	9	8	9	37	39	−2	35
10	Houston Dash	26	8	6	12	27	39	−12	30
11	Angel City FC	26	7	6	13	31	41	−10	27
12	Utah Royals	26	6	7	13	28	42	−14	25
13	Bay FC	26	4	8	14	26	41	−15	20

Source: NWSL
Rules for classification: 1) points; 2) total goal difference; 3) total wins; 4) total goals scored; 5) head-to-head points; 6) head-to-head goals scored; 7) fewest disciplinary points; 8) coin toss (if 2 clubs tied) or drawing of lots (if ≥3 clubs tied).

==== Results summary ====
Overall								Home						Away					
Pld	W	D	L	GF	GA	GD	Pts	W	D	L	GF	GA	GD	W	D	L	GF	GA	GD
26	7	6	13	31	41	−10	27	5	3	5	17	19	−2	2	3	8	14	22	−8

Last updated: November 2, 2025.
Source: NWSLsoccer.com

==== Results by matchday ====
Matchday	1	2	3	4	5	6	7	8	9	10	11	12	13	14	15	16	17	18	19	20	21	22	23	24	25	26
Ground	H	A	H	A	H	A	A	H	A	H	H	H	A	A	A	A	H	H	A	A	H	A	H	H	H	A
Result	D	D	W	W	L	L	W	W	L	L	D	L	L	L	D	D	W	W	L	L	D	L	L	W	L	L
Position	4	8	4	4	5	9	8	5	7	7	9	10	11	11	11	12	10	9	10	11	11	11	11	10	11	11

Updated to match(es) played on November 2, 2025. Source: NWSLsoccer.com
A = Away; H = Home; W = Win; D = Draw; L = Loss; P = Postponed

== Transactions ==
=== Contract options ===
Date	Nat.	Player	Pos.	Notes	Ref.
December 4, 2024	(United States)	Madison Curry	DF	Signed with Seattle Reign FC as a free agent.	
December 10, 2024	(United States)	Meggie Dougherty Howard	MF	Contract expired and signed with Calgary Wild FC.	
December 10, 2024	(United States)	Jasmyne Spencer	DF	Contract expired and signed with Vancouver Rise FC.	
December 10, 2024	(Mexico)	Katie Johnson	FW	Contract expired and subsequently announced retirement.	
December 10, 2024	(Bosnia and Herzegovina)	DiDi Haračić	GK	Contract expired and signed with San Diego Wave FC.	
June 30, 2025	(United States)	Hannah Johnson	DF	Contract expired.	
June 30, 2025	(United States)	Breanna Norris	GK	Contract expired.	

=== Re-signings ===
Date	Nat.	Player	Pos.	Notes	Ref.
October 29, 2024	(United States)	Sydney Leroux	DF	Re-signed on a new contract through 2027.	
November 22, 2024	(Scotland)	Claire Emslie	FW	Re-signed on a new contract through 2026.	
December 4, 2024	(Japan)	Hannah Stambaugh	GK	Re-signed on a new contract through 2025.	
December 16, 2024	(United States)	M.A. Vignola	DF	Re-signed on a new contract through 2026	
January 17, 2025	(United States)	Christen Press	FW	Re-signed on a new contract through 2025.	
January 29, 2025	(United States)	Alyssa Thompson	FW	Re-signed on a new contract through 2028.	
January 29, 2025	(United States)	Gisele Thompson	DF	Re-signed on a new contract through 2028.	
February 7, 2025	(United States)	Angelina Anderson	GK	Re-signed on a new contract through 2028.	
March 5, 2025	(United States)	Savy King	DF	Re-signed on a new contract through 2028.	
July 21, 2025	(South Korea)	Casey Phair	FW	Re-signed on a new contract through 2028.	
September 5, 2025	(United States)	Gisele Thompson	DF	Re-signed on a new contract through 2029.	

=== Preseason trialists ===
Date	Nat.	Player	Pos.	Previous club	Fee/notes	Ref.
January 22, 2025	(United States)	Scottie Antonucci	MF	(United States) Club Legends FC	U18 trialist.	
January 22, 2025	(United States)	Hannah Johnson	MF	(United States) Mississippi State	Signed to roster relief contract through June 30, 2025.	
January 22, 2025	(United States)	Breanna Norris	GK	(United States) Portland Pilots	Signed to roster relief contract through June 30, 2025.	
January 22, 2025	(United States)	Leena Powell	FW	(United States) Club Tudela FC	U18 trialist.	
January 22, 2025	(United States)	Riley Tiernan	FW	(United States) Rutgers	Signed to a two-year contract with club option for 2027.	
May 16, 2025	(United States)	Sophia Mattice	DF	(United States) Kentucky Wildcats	Signed to a short term roster relief contract on May 16, 2025.	

=== Loans out ===
Date	Nat.	Player	Pos.	Destination club	Fee/notes	Ref.
September 19, 2022	(Canada)	Vanessa Gilles	DF	(France) Olympique Lyon	Loan concluded June 30, 2025, and subsequently joined FC Bayern Munich.	
February 21, 2025	(Colombia)	Maithé López	FW	(United States) Lexington SC	Recalled from loan on October 10, 2025.	
July 21, 2025	(South Korea)	Casey Phair	FW	(Sweden) Djurgårdens IF	Loaned until December 2025.	
September 11, 2025	(United States)	Lily Nabet	MF	(United States) Fort Lauderdale United	Loaned until December 2025.	

=== Transfers in ===
Date	Nat.	Player	Pos.	Previous club	Fee/notes	Ref.
December 17, 2024	(France)	Julie Dufour	FW	(France) Paris FC	Signed contract through 2027 season via transfer from Paris FC for an undisclosed transfer fee.	
December 23, 2024	(United States)	Macey Hodge	MF	(United States) Mississippi State	Signed contract through 2026 season with a club option for 2027.	
January 21, 2025	(Australia)	Alanna Kennedy	MF	(England) Manchester City	Signed one-year contract through 2025 season with mutual option for 2026.	
January 31, 2025	(Japan)	Miyabi Moriya	DF	(Japan) INAC Kobe Leonessa	Signed one-year contract through 2025 with a club option for 2026.	
February 3, 2025	(United States)	Savy King	DF	(United States) Bay FC	Acquired from Bay FC in exchange for $200,000 in intra-league transfer funds plus $100,000 in 2026.	
February 21, 2025	(Colombia)	Maithé López	FW	(Colombia) Real Santander	Signed four-year contract through 2028.	
March 3, 2025	(United States)	Hannah Johnson	DF	(United States) Mississippi State	Signed to roster relief contract through June 30, 2025.	
March 3, 2025	(United States)	Riley Tiernan	FW	(United States) Rutgers	Signed to a two-year contract with club option for 2027.	
March 12, 2025	(United States)	Breanna Norris	GK	(United States) Portland Pilots	Signed to roster relief contract through June 30, 2025.	
March 27, 2025	(Brazil)	Maiara Niehues	MF	(Portugal) Sporting CP	Signed to a three-year contract through 2027 for an undisclosed transfer fee.	
May 16, 2025	(United States)	Sophia Mattice	DF	(United States) Kentucky Wildcats	Signed to a short term roster relief contract.	
May 21, 2025	(Iceland)	Sveindís Jane Jónsdóttir	FW	(Germany) VfL Wolfsburg	Signed two and half year contract through 2027 season.	
June 1, 2025	(United States)	Hannah Seabert	GK	(Portugal) Sporting CP	Signed contract through 2026 season.	
July 10, 2025	(United States)	Evelyn Shores	MF	(United States) North Carolina Tar Heels	Signed contract through 2028 season.	
July 22, 2025	(Germany)	Sara Doorsoun	DF	(Germany) Eintracht Frankfurt	Signed contract through 2026 season for an undisclosed transfer fee.	
September 9, 2025	(United States)	Nealy Martin	MF	(United States) Gotham FC	Acquired from Gotham FC in exchange for $85,000 in intra-league transfer funds.	
September 30, 2025	(Japan)	Hina Sugita	MF	(United States) Portland Thorns FC	Acquired from Portland Thorns FC in exchange for M.A. Vignola and $600,000 in intra-league transfer funds.	
October 9, 2025	(Zambia)	Prisca Chilufya	FW	(United States) Orlando Pride	Acquired from Orlando Pride, along with an international roster spot, in exchange for $50,000 in intra-league transfer funds.	

=== Transfers out ===
Date	Nat.	Player	Pos.	Destination club	Fee/notes	Ref.
December 20, 2024	(Costa Rica)	Rocky Rodríguez	MF	(United States) Kansas City Current	Traded in exchange for $100,000 in intra-league transfer funds.	
January 27, 2025	(United States)	Messiah Bright	FW	(United States) Houston Dash	Traded in exchange for $100,000 in intra-league transfer funds and up to $50,000 in additional performance-based incentives.	
May 20, 2025	(Canada)	Vanessa Gilles	DF	(Germany) FC Bayern Munich	Loan with Lyon concluded and subsequently traded for an undisclosed transfer fee.	
August 23, 2025	(France)	Julie Dufour	FW	(United States) Portland Thorns FC	Traded in exchange for $40,000 in intra-league transfer funds.	
August 27, 2025	(Australia)	Alanna Kennedy	MF	(England) London City Lionesses	Traded in exchange for an undisclosed transfer fee.	
August 27, 2025	(England)	Katie Zelem	MF	(England) London City Lionesses	Traded in exchange for an undisclosed transfer fee.	
September 5, 2025	(United States)	Alyssa Thompson	FW	(England) Chelsea	Traded in exchange for an undisclosed transfer fee.	
September 30, 2025	(United States)	M.A. Vignola	DF	(United States) Portland Thorns FC	Traded in exchange for Hina Sugita.	

=== Retirements ===
Date	Nat.	Player	Pos.	Ref.
December 20, 2024	(Mexico)	Katie Johnson	FW	

=== Injury listings ===
Date	Nat.	Player	Pos.	List	Injury/Notes	Ref.
February 14, 2024	(Japan)	Jun Endo	FW	Season-ending injury	Left knee anterior cruciate ligament tear. Removed from SEI list on June 6, 2025.	
August 22, 2024	(New Zealand)	Ali Riley	DF	Season-ending injury	Due to a chronic and persistent leg injury. Removed from SEI list on July 29, 2025.	

== Statistics ==
As of November 2, 2025.

No	Pos	Nat	Player	Total		NWSL Regular Season		NWSL Playoffs		Other	
No	Pos	Nat	Player	Apps	Starts	Apps	Starts	Apps	Starts	Apps	Starts
Goalkeepers
1	GK	(Japan)	Hannah Stambaugh	0	0	0	0	0	0	0	0
13	GK	(United States)	Hannah Seabert	4	4	4	4	0	0	0	0
19	GK	(United States)	Angelina Anderson	22	22	22	22	0	0	0	0
Defenders
3	DF	(United States)	Savy King	8	8	8	8	0	0	0	0
5	DF	(New Zealand)	Ali Riley	2	0	2	0	0	0	0	0
6	DF	(Canada)	Megan Reid	18	9	18	9	0	0	0	0
11	DF	(United States)	Sarah Gorden	26	26	26	26	0	0	0	0
20	DF	(United States)	Gisele Thompson	23	21	23	21	0	0	0	0
25	DF	(United States)	Sophia Mattice	3	0	3	0	0	0	0	0
29	DF	(Japan)	Miyabi Moriya	25	13	25	13	0	0	0	0
30	DF	(Germany)	Sara Doorsoun	8	7	8	7	0	0	0	0
44	DF	(United States)	Elizabeth Eddy	0	0	0	0	0	0	0	0
Midfielders
7	MF	(Japan)	Hina Sugita	4	4	4	4	0	0	0	0
8	MF	(United States)	Macey Hodge	16	9	16	9	0	0	0	0
12	MF	(Brazil)	Maiara Niehues	14	4	14	4	0	0	0	0
14	MF	(United States)	Nealy Martin	7	6	7	6	0	0	0	0
15	MF	(United States)	Evelyn Shores	12	12	12	12	0	0	0	0
17	MF	(United States)	Kennedy Fuller	26	21	26	21	0	0	0	0
99	MF	(United States)	Madison Hammond	21	9	21	9	0	0	0	0
Forwards
2	FW	(United States)	Sydney Leroux	0	0	0	0	0	0	0	0
10	FW	(Scotland)	Claire Emslie	8	7	8	7	0	0	0	0
18	FW	(Japan)	Jun Endo	10	6	10	6	0	0	0	0
23	FW	(United States)	Christen Press	22	2	22	2	0	0	0	0
24	FW	(Zambia)	Prisca Chilufya	3	0	3	0	0	0	0	0
27	FW	(Colombia)	Maithé López	0	0	0	0	0	0	0	0
32	FW	(Iceland)	Sveindís Jane Jónsdóttir	13	12	13	12	0	0	0	0
33	FW	(United States)	Riley Tiernan	26	26	26	26	0	0	0	0
Other players (Departed during season, short-term loan, etc.)
4	MF	(England)	Katie Zelem	15	6	15	6	0	0	0	0
7	FW	(France)	Julie Dufour	10	4	10	4	0	0	0	0
9	FW	(South Korea)	Casey Phair	5	0	5	0	0	0	0	0
14	MF	(Australia)	Alanna Kennedy	16	16	16	16	0	0	0	0
16	DF	(United States)	M.A. Vignola	20	16	20	16	0	0	0	0
21	FW	(United States)	Alyssa Thompson	16	16	16	16	0	0	0	0
26	DF	(United States)	Hannah Johnson	1	0	1	0	0	0	0	0
28	MF	(United States)	Lily Nabet	1	0	1	0	0	0	0	0
35	GK	(United States)	Breanna Norris	0	0	0	0	0	0	0	0
—	DF	(Canada)	Vanessa Gilles	0	0	0	0	0	0	0	0

=== Goals ===
Pos.	No.	Nat.	Name	NWSL	Playoffs	Other	Total
FW	33	(United States)	Riley Tiernan	8	0	0	8
FW	21	(United States)	Alyssa Thompson	6	0	0	6
MF	17	(United States)	Kennedy Fuller	4	0	0	4
MF	12	(Brazil)	Maiara Niehues	2	0	0	2
MF	4	(England)	Katie Zelem	2	0	0	2
MF	8	(United States)	Macey Hodge	1	0	0	1
FW	32	(Iceland)	Sveindís Jane Jónsdóttir	1	0	0	1
MF	14	(Australia)	Alanna Kennedy	1	0	0	1
DF	29	(Japan)	Miyabi Moriya	1	0	0	1
FW	23	(United States)	Christen Press	1	0	0	1
MF	15	(United States)	Evelyn Shores	1	0	0	1
DF	20	(United States)	Gisele Thompson	1	0	0	1
DF	16	(United States)	M.A. Vignola	1	0	0	1
Own goals				1	0	0	1
Total				31	—	—	31

=== Assists ===
Pos.	No.	Nat.	Name	NWSL	Playoffs	Other	Total
DF	20	(United States)	Gisele Thompson	5	0	0	5
MF	17	(United States)	Kennedy Fuller	3	0	0	3
DF	29	(Japan)	Miyabi Moriya	2	0	0	2
FW	21	(United States)	Alyssa Thompson	2	0	0	2
DF	16	(United States)	M.A. Vignola	2	0	0	2
FW	10	(Scotland)	Claire Emslie	1	0	0	1
FW	18	(Japan)	Jun Endō	1	0	0	1
FW	32	(Iceland)	Sveindís Jane Jónsdóttir	1	0	0	1
MF	14	(Australia)	Alanna Kennedy	1	0	0	1
MF	14	(United States)	Nealy Martin	1	0	0	1
FW	33	(United States)	Riley Tiernan	1	0	0	1
Total				20	—	—	20

=== Clean sheets ===
Pos.	No.	Nat.	Name	NWSL	Playoffs	Other	Total
GK	19	(United States)	Angelina Anderson	2	0	0	2
GK	13	(United States)	Hannah Seabert	2	0	0	2
Total				4	—	—	4

=== Disciplinary cards ===
Player				NWSL		Playoffs		Other		Total	
Pos.	No.	Nat.	Name	Booked	Sent off (straight red)	Booked	Sent off (straight red)	Booked	Sent off (straight red)	Booked	Sent off (straight red)
MF	8	(United States)	Macey Hodge	6	0	0	0	0	0	6	0
FW	33	(United States)	Riley Tiernan	4	0	0	0	0	0	4	0
MF	12	(Brazil)	Maiara Niehues	3	0	0	0	0	0	3	0
FW	21	(United States)	Alyssa Thompson	3	0	0	0	0	0	3	0
DF	11	(United States)	Sarah Gorden	2	0	0	0	0	0	2	0
DF	3	(United States)	Savy King	2	0	0	0	0	0	2	0
MF	4	(England)	Katie Zelem	2	0	0	0	0	0	2	0
DF	30	(Germany)	Sara Doorsoun	1	0	0	0	0	0	1	0
FW	7	(France)	Julie Dufour	1	0	0	0	0	0	1	0
MF	17	(United States)	Kennedy Fuller	1	0	0	0	0	0	1	0
MF	99	(United States)	Madison Hammond	1	0	0	0	0	0	1	0
FW	32	(Iceland)	Sveindís Jane Jónsdóttir	1	0	0	0	0	0	1	0
MF	14	(United States)	Nealy Martin	1	0	0	0	0	0	1	0
DF	29	(Japan)	Miyabi Moriya	1	0	0	0	0	0	1	0
DF	6	(Canada)	Megan Reid	1	0	0	0	0	0	1	0
MF	15	(United States)	Evelyn Shores	1	0	0	0	0	0	1	0
MF	7	(Japan)	Hina Sugita	1	0	0	0	0	0	1	0
DF	20	(United States)	Gisele Thompson	1	0	0	0	0	0	1	0
DF	16	(United States)	M.A. Vignola	1	0	0	0	0	0	1	0
Team official		(England)	Sam Laity	0	1	0	0	0	0	0	1
Total				34	1	—	—	—	—	34	1
