= Sam Laity =

English football manager (born 1976)

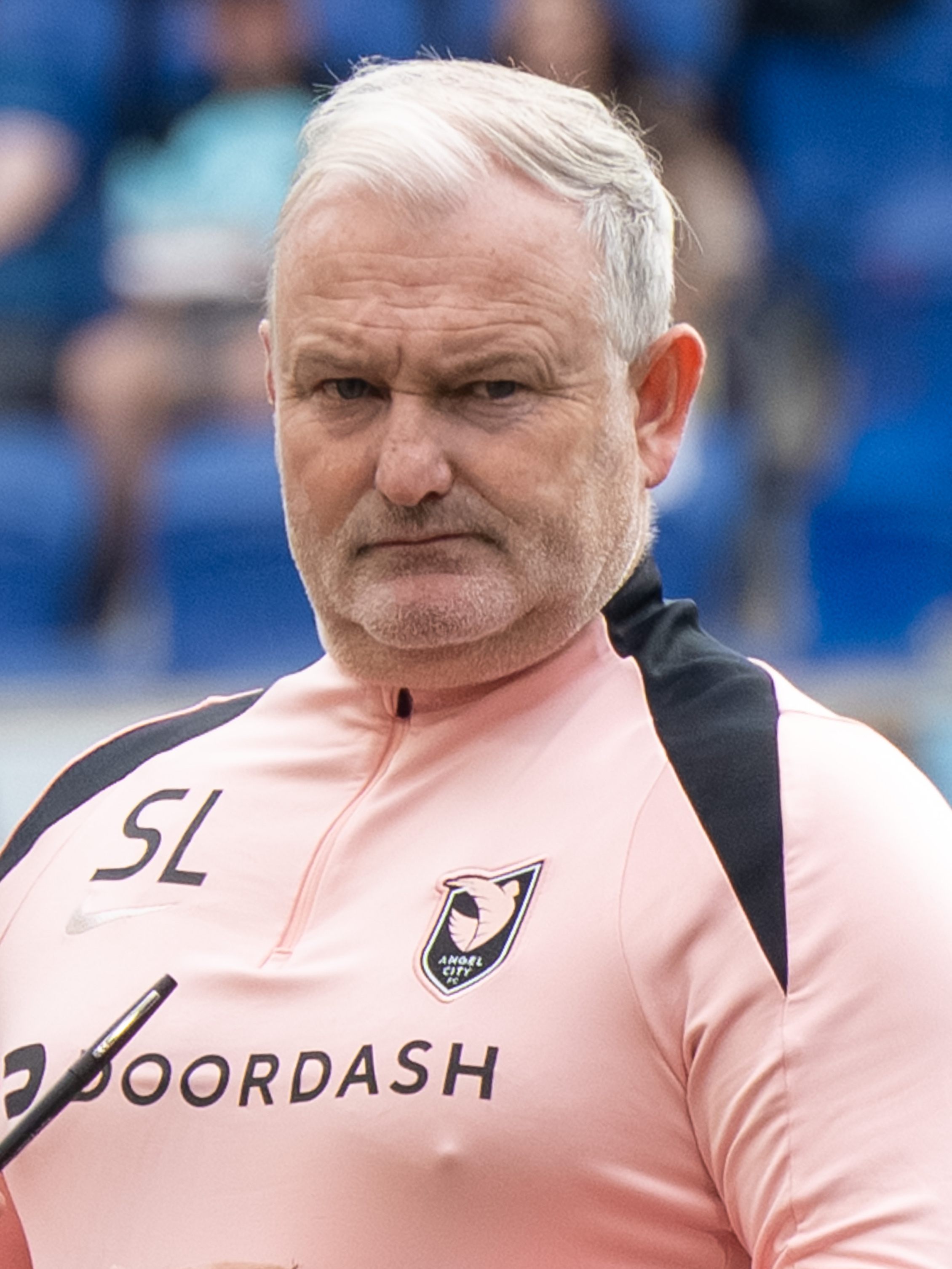
- Laity with Angel City in 2025

Personal information
- Full name: Sam James Laity
- Date of birth: 3 July 1976 (age 50)
- Place of birth: Plymouth, England

Managerial career
- Years: Team
- 2013–2022: Seattle Reign FC (assistant)
- 2021: Seattle Reign FC (interim)
- 2022–2023: Houston Dash
- 2025: Angel City FC (interim)
- 2025–: Angel City FC (assistant)

Sam James Laity (born 3 July 1976) is an English football manager who is currently a senior assistant coach at Angel City FC in the American National Women's Soccer League (NWSL). He was previously an assistant coach for fellow American teams Houston Dash and Seattle Reign FC, where he also served as interim coach for a period in 2021.

== Early life ==
Laity attended university in Plymouth, England, where he began coaching girls' school programs for the Devon County Football Association. After completing his studies, Laity moved to the United States to continue his work in the sport. He worked as a coach for Seattle-area youth clubs Dos FC, Westsound FC, and Pacific Premier, was director of the Pacific Northwest Soccer Club in Tukwila, Washington, and worked as a regional staff instructor and coaching education and licensing coordinator for the National Soccer Coaches Association of America.

== Managerial career ==
=== Seattle Reign (assistant and interim), 2013–2022 ===
Laity was an assistant coach for Seattle Reign FC, later renamed to Reign FC and OL Reign, from its inaugural season in 2013 until 2022. During his tenure, he was an assistant to Laura Harvey, Vlatko Andonovski, and Farid Benstiti, and served as interim coach for six matches after Benstiti's resignation during the 2021 season. He was also a coach in the Reign's academy system from its incorporation in 2016 to 2019.

=== Houston Dash, 2022–2023 ===
On 21 December 2022, NWSL club Houston Dash hired Laity as head coach. On 6 September 2023, the Dash fired Laity.

=== Angel City FC, 2025– ===
On January 22, 2025, NWSL club Angel City FC announced along with their preseason roster, that they are hired Laity as interim head coach during their search for a new head coach after the departure of Becki Tweed. Laity is expected to remain in the role until June 1, 2025, when incoming head coach Alexander Straus begins their tenure, while Laity will remain on the coaching staff as a senior assistant coach once Straus arrives.

== Managerial statistics ==
As of 14 April 2023

Managerial record by team and tenure
Team	From	To	Record					Ref.
Team	From	To	P	W	D	L	Win %	Ref.
OL Reign (interim)	2 July 2021	8 August 2021	6	4	0	2	66.7	
Houston Dash	26 March 2023	6 September 2023	24	6	8	10	25.0	
Total			30	10	8	12	33.3	

== Personal life ==
Laity is a fan of architecture and especially admires the Nelson-Atkins Museum of Art in Kansas City, Missouri, and structures in Boston, Massachusetts.
