= Nealy Martin =

American soccer player (born 1998)

- Martin with Angel City FC in 2026

Personal information
- Full name: Nealy Cameron Martin
- Date of birth: April 22, 1998 (age 28)
- Place of birth: Birmingham, Alabama, U.S.
- Height: 5 ft 7 in (1.70 m)
- Positions: Defender; defensive midfielder

Team information
- Current team: Angel City
- Number: 14

Youth career
- Birmingham United

College career
Years	Team	Apps	(Gls)
2016–2019	Alabama Crimson Tide	76	(5)

Senior career*
Years	Team	Apps	(Gls)
2021–2022	Racing Louisville	29	(0)
2023–2025	Gotham FC	56	(0)
2025–	Angel City	31	(1)
- * Club domestic league appearances and goals as of 06:02, November 12, 2026 (UTC)

Martin with Angel City in 2026

Nealy Cameron Martin (born April 22, 1998) is an American professional soccer player who plays as a defender or defensive midfielder for Angel City FC of the National Women's Soccer League (NWSL). She played college soccer for the Alabama Crimson Tide. She has also previously played for Racing Louisville FC and Gotham FC. She has occasionally served as an emergency goalkeeper, most notably in the closing minutes of Gotham's victory in the 2023 NWSL Championship.

== Early life and college career ==
Born in Birmingham, Alabama, Martin began playing soccer at the age of three. She attended Oak Mountain High School, which she helped lead to the Class 7A state championship in 2015, conceding a school-record-low six goals throughout her senior season. She played ECNL club soccer for Birmingham United. She was named the Birmingham Player of the Year after her senior season and was the top-ranked recruit of her class from the state of Alabama.

=== Alabama Crimson Tide ===
Initially wanting to attend Auburn University, the alma mater of her parents, Martin was recruited by the University of Alabama during her junior year. She appeared in all 19 games (16 starts) in her freshman season in 2016. She started all 18 games in her sophomore season, helping Alabama qualify for the NCAA tournament where they lost in the first round. In her junior season, she started 19 games and scored 2 goals. On August 17, 2018, when goalkeeper Alex Plavin received a red card against TCU, junior defender Martin played 48 seconds in goal, saving a free kick attempt by Yazmeen Ryan. Alabama was then able to substitute goalkeeper Kaylee Hammer. Martin scored a career-high 3 goals in 20 games in her senior season. She helped Alabama reach the quarterfinals of SEC tournament, where she scored in what was her final game as they lost 2–1 to Vanderbilt.

== Club career ==
=== Racing Louisville ===
Martin went overseas to Wales to study and try to continue playing soccer when she heard that National Women's Soccer League club Racing Louisville FC was holding open tryouts in December 2020. She was named to Louisville's preseason roster and officially signed with the club on April 5, 2021. She made her professional debut on April 10, starting in a 2–2 draw against the Orlando Pride in the group stage of the NWSL Challenge Cup. She appeared in 18 matches (13 starts) for the season at center back or outside back.

Martin made 4 starts for Louisville at right back in the 2022 NWSL Challenge Cup. In the regular season, she made 11 appearances (8 starts) but was unused for 10 of the last 11 games of the year. She was waived by Louisville at the end of the season.

=== Gotham FC ===
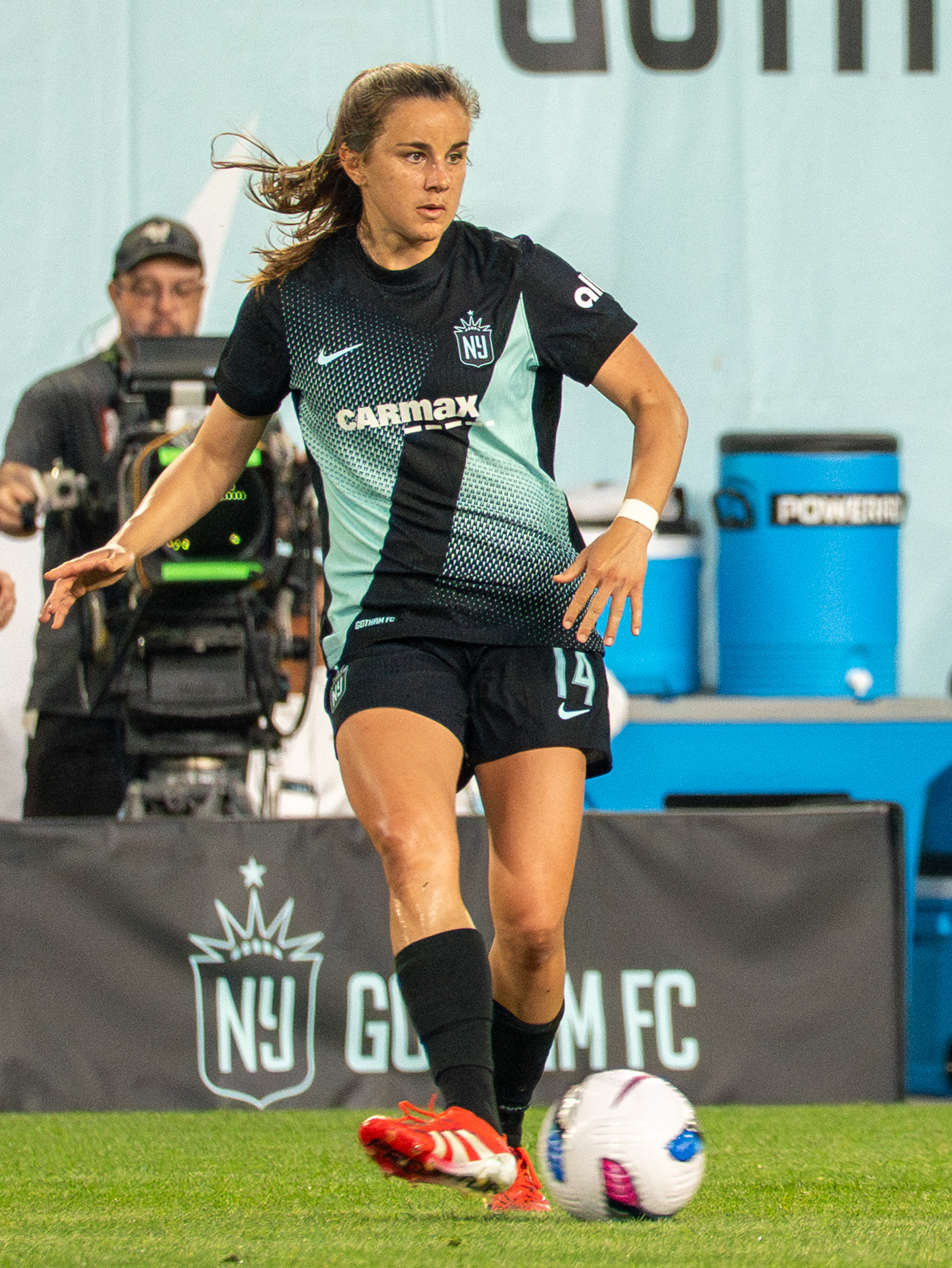
Nealy Martin with Gotham FC in 2025

NJ/NY Gotham FC signed Martin off the waiver wire on December 8, 2022, on a one-year contract with an option for an additional year. She made her club debut on April 19, 2023, coming on for Kristie Mewis in a 1–0 win against the Washington Spirit in the NWSL Challenge Cup group stage. She recorded her first NWSL assist on June 25, when Lynn Williams scored off Martin's throw-in for the opening goal in a 2–1 win against the Chicago Red Stars. On August 19, during a 2–1 loss to the San Diego Wave, she played the final minutes of stoppage time in goal after goalkeeper Abby Smith was injured and Gotham had used all their substitutions. On September 22, she signed a new contract to keep her with Gotham through 2026. She finished the 2023 regular season with 15 appearances (13 starts) as a defensive midfielder as Gotham placed sixth of 12 teams.

In the 2023 playoffs, Martin started as Gotham defeated the North Carolina Courage 2–0 and the Portland Thorns 1–0 in extra time to reach the championship game. In the title game on November 12, Gotham led OL Reign 2–1 when goalkeeper Mandy Haught was sent off with a straight red card in the 97th minute. Martin stepped in goal for the second time that year, putting on a goalkeeper jersey that was too big for her. After the Reign's Rose Lavelle hit her free kick into Gotham's wall of players, the whistle blew for Gotham's victory 90 seconds later. Gotham offered Nealy Martin goalkeeper jerseys for sale on her birthday the next year.

Martin appeared in 24 games (21 starts) in the 2024 regular season as Gotham finished third in the standings. She also started all 5 games in the 2024 NWSL x Liga MX Femenil Summer Cup, helping Gotham not concede until the final 2–0 loss to the Kansas City Current. In the 2024 playoffs, she played every minute as Gotham beat the Portland Thorns 2–1 before losing to the Washington Spirit on penalties after a 1–1 draw in the semifinals.

On May 25, 2025, she played in the 2025 CONCACAF W Champions Cup final against Tigres, where Gotham won 1–0 to become the inaugural winners of the competition.

=== Angel City FC ===
On September 9, 2025, it was announced that Martin had been traded to Angel City FC from Gotham FC in exchange for $85k in intra-league transfer funds. Martin made her Angel City debut on September 13, coming on as a halftime substitute for Macey Hodge in a 2–1 loss to the North Carolina Courage. On September 18, 2025, Martin started her first match for Angel City at BMO Stadium against Washington Spirit, which finished as a 2–2 draw.

On Decision Day, November 1, 2026, Nealy Martin scored her first professional NWSL goal in a 4-1 victory over the Boston Legacy, helping Angel City extend its unbeaten streak to 10 matches and secure the fifth seed in the 2026 playoffs.

== International career ==
Martin was called into camp with the United States national team in January 2025, her first national team call-up at any level.

== Career statistics ==
As of match played September 18, 2025

Appearances and goals by club, season and competition
Club	Season	League			Cup (Note: Includes the NWSL Challenge Cup)		Playoffs (Note: Includes NWSL Playoffs)		Continental (Note: Includes CONCACAF W Champions Cup)		Total	
Club	Season	Division	Apps	Goals	Apps	Goals	Apps	Goals	Apps	Goals	Apps	Goals
Racing Louisville FC	2021	NWSL	18	0	3	0	—		—		21	0
Racing Louisville FC	2022	NWSL	11	0	4	0	—		—		15	0
Gotham FC	2023	NWSL	15	0	6	0	3	0	—		24	0
Gotham FC	2024	NWSL	24	0	5	0	2	0	—		31	0
Gotham FC	2025	NWSL	16	0	—		—		2	0	18	0
Angel City FC	2025	NWSL	2	1	—		—		—		2	0
Career total			86	1	18	0	5	0	2	0	111	0

== Honors ==
Gotham FC

- NWSL Championship: 2023
- CONCACAF W Champions Cup: 2024–25

Individual

- SEC Scholar Athlete of the Year: 2019
