= Sophia Mattice =

American soccer player (born 2002)

- Mattice with Angel City FC in 2026

Personal information
- Date of birth: June 25, 2002 (age 24)
- Place of birth: Folsom, California, U.S.
- Height: 5 ft 8 in (1.73 m)
- Position: Defender

Team information
- Current team: Angel City FC
- Number: 25

Youth career
- San Juan SC

College career
Years	Team	Apps	(Gls)
2020–2023	Portland Pilots	60	(5)
2024	Kentucky Wildcats	18	(2)

Senior career*
Years	Team	Apps	(Gls)
2025–	Angel City FC	7	(0)
- * Club domestic league appearances and goals as of 06:03, November 12, 2026 (UTC)

Sophia Mattice (born June 25, 2002) is an American professional soccer player who plays as a defender for Angel City FC of the National Women's Soccer League (NWSL). She played college soccer for the Portland Pilots and the Kentucky Wildcats.

== Early life ==
Mattice grew up in Folsom, California, where she attended Folsom High School. During the 2019–20 season, her senior year, she served as team captain and appeared in 19 matches, scoring four goals and recording six assists. She played club soccer for San Juan SC.

== College career ==
Mattice played college soccer for the Portland Pilots from 2020 to 2023 and the Kentucky Wildcats in 2024. As a freshman in 2020, she started all nine matches she played for Portland, scoring one goal and recording one assist. She was named to the All-WCC Freshman Team. In 2021, she appeared in 17 matches, making 15 starts, and recorded three assists. In 2022, she appeared in 18 matches, including 16 starts, scoring one goal and recording three assists. Following the season, she was named an All-WCC honorable mention.

In 2023, Mattice started all 16 matches, scoring three goals and recording three assists. She transferred to the Kentucky Wildcats for the 2024 season, her graduate season, and was named to the SEC Preseason Watchlist. She started 18 matches for Kentucky, scoring two goals and recording one assist. Mattice finished her collegiate career with 78 appearances and seven goals.

== Club career ==
On May 16, 2025, Mattice signed a short-term contract with the National Women's Soccer League club Angel City FC. Following the 2025 season, she signed a contract extension to remain with the club through the 2026 season. Mattice recorded her first professional assist on July 26, 2026, setting up Angel City's lone goal in the 80th minute of a 2–1 loss to Racing Louisville FC.

== Career statistics ==
As of November 2, 2025

Appearances and goals by club, season and competition
Club	Season	League			Cup (Note: Includes the NWSL Challenge Cup)		Playoffs (Note: Includes NWSL Playoffs)		Continental (Note: Includes CONCACAF W Champions Cup)		Other		Total		Ref.
Club	Season	Division	Apps	Goals	Apps	Goals	Apps	Goals	Apps	Goals	Apps	Goals	Apps	Goals	Ref.
Angel City FC	2025	NWSL	3	0	—		0	0	—		0	0	3	0	
Career total			3	0	0	0	0	0	0	0	0	0	3	0	–
