= Macey Hodge =

American soccer player (born 2001)

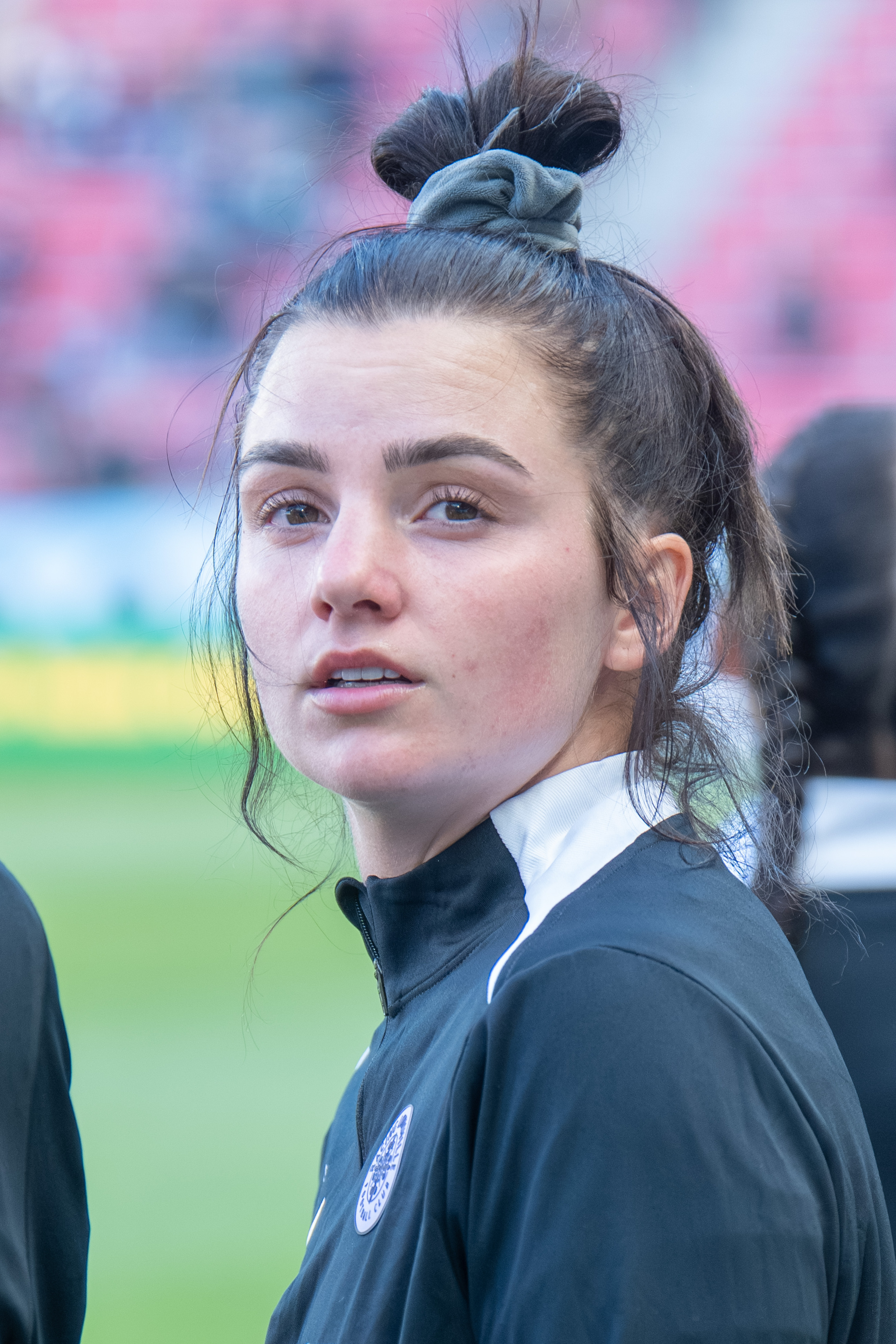
- Hodge with Racing Louisville in 2026

Personal information
- Full name: Macey Kamryn Hodge
- Date of birth: May 4, 2001 (age 25)
- Height: 5 ft 6 in (1.68 m)
- Position: Midfielder

Team information
- Current team: Racing Louisville
- Number: 10

College career
Years	Team	Apps	(Gls)
2020–2024	Mississippi State Bulldogs	97	(0)

Senior career*
Years	Team	Apps	(Gls)
2025	Angel City	16	(1)
2026–	Racing Louisville	23	(0)
- * Club domestic league appearances and goals as of 06:06, November 2, 2026 (UTC)

Macey Kamryn Hodge (born May 4, 2001) is an American professional soccer player who plays as a midfielder for Racing Louisville FC of the National Women's Soccer League (NWSL). She played college soccer for the Mississippi State Bulldogs, earning first-team All-American honors in 2024. She began her professional career with Angel City FC in 2025.

== Early life ==
Hodge was raised in Douglasville, Georgia, with two sisters by her mother, Kandi Vaughn, and her stepfather, Michael. She began playing soccer with Southern Soccer Academy at age eight. She attended Robert S. Alexander High School, where she was named the most valuable player on the soccer team in her freshman, sophomore, and senior years. Hodge was rated as a two-star recruit by TopDrawerSoccer and committed to Vanderbilt after her sophomore year.

Shortly before graduating in 2019, Hodge decided to quit soccer for the sake of her mental health. She was dealing with anxiety due to a combination of expectations; her birth father's struggle with addiction, which often made him absent from her life; coming out to her family; and her sister's kidney disease diagnosis, from which she later recovered. Hodge instead enrolled in the University of West Georgia and got a job as a cashier at Kroger. Within a semester, however, she felt ready to return to soccer and decided to transfer to Mississippi State at the start of 2020, a program where her club coach knew several assistant coaches.

== College career ==
Hodge worked herself back into form and came off the bench in the season opener for the Mississippi State Bulldogs in 2020. She started every remaining game that season, being used across the positions of attacking midfielder, defensive midfielder, and center back. She was voted one of the team's captains by her second season. In 2022, she started every game and helped Mississippi State secure their first NCAA tournament match win in program history. In 2023, she earned first-team All-SEC honors as she led Mississippi State to their first SEC tournament semifinal appearance and the third round of the NCAA tournament, where they lost to eventual finalists Stanford.

Hodge was central to Mississippi State's breakout 2024 season as they went 10–0 in conference play, allowing only two goals in ten games, to claim the program's first SEC regular-season title. The Bulldogs received a top seed in the NCAA tournament and equaled their best-ever showing, falling in the third round against Notre Dame when they conceded at home for the first time all year. For her performance, Hodge was named first-team All-American, first-team All-SEC, and the SEC Midfielder of the Year. She finished her five years in Starkville with 97 appearances (96 starts), the most in program history.

== Club career ==
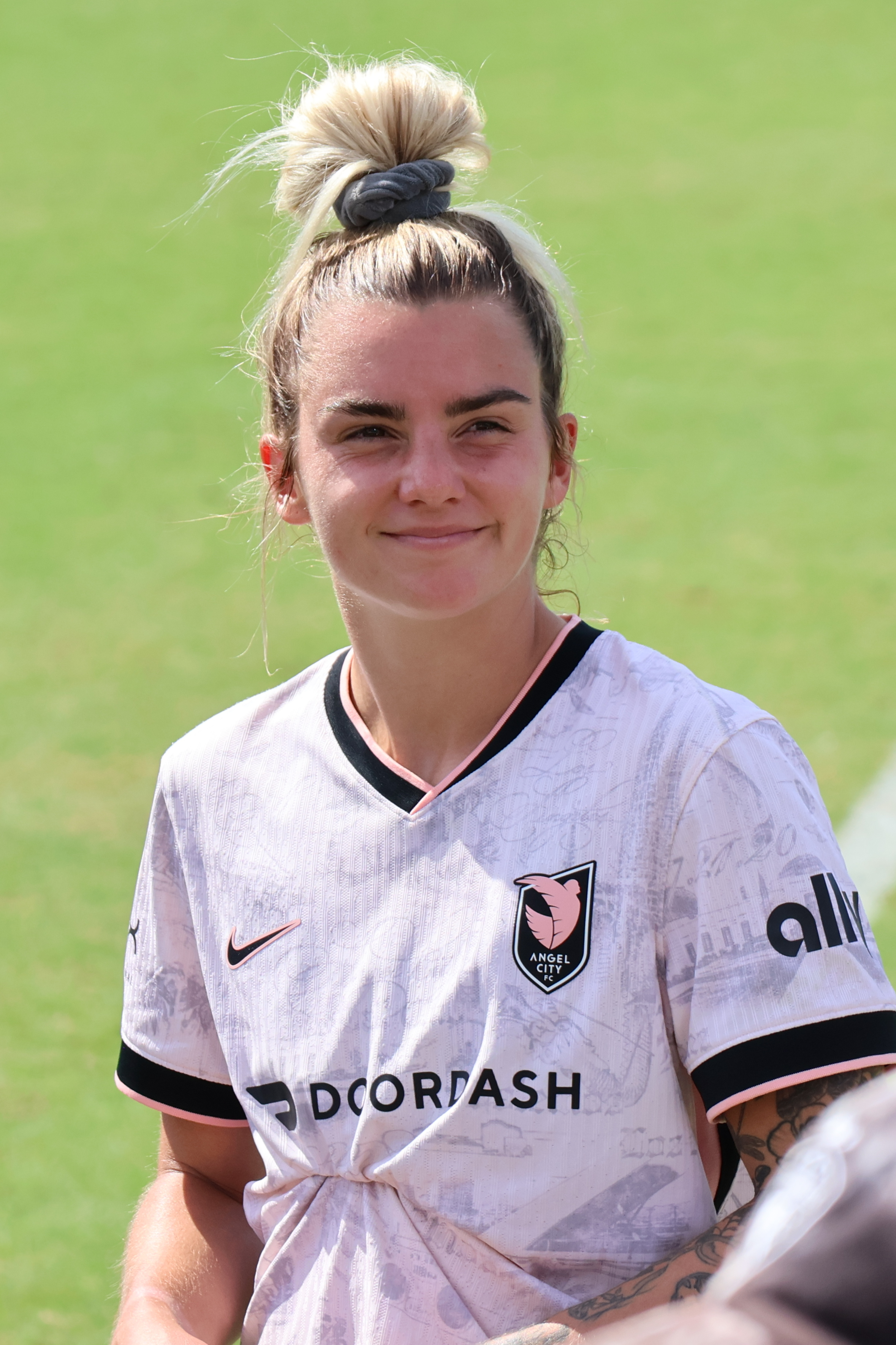
Hodge with Angel City FC in 2025

=== Angel City FC ===
Angel City FC announced on December 23, 2024, that they had signed Hodge to her first professional contract on a two-year deal with the club option to extend an additional year. She made her professional debut in the season opener, starting and playing 75 minutes in a 1–1 draw against the San Diego Wave on March 16, 2025. On April 12, she scored her first professional goal to open the scoring in a 3–1 victory over the Houston Dash. On September 1, she picked up her fifth yellow card of the season and was suspended for the following game. She played in 16 games as a rookie, starting 9, and scored 1 goal as Angel City placed 11th and missed the playoffs.

=== Racing Louisville ===
On January 14, 2026, Hodge was traded to Racing Louisville FC in exchange for US$55,000 in intraleague transfer funds, US$28,000 in allocation money, and an international roster spot for the next two seasons. The following month, Racing re-signed Hodge to a new deal through 2027 with a mutual contract option for 2028.

== Career statistics ==
As of November 1, 2025

Appearances and goals by club, season and competition
Club	Season	League			Playoffs		Total	
Club	Season	Division	Apps	Goals	Apps	Goals	Apps	Goals
Angel City FC	2025	NWSL	16	1	—		16	1
Career total			16	1	0	0	16	1

== Honors and awards ==
Mississippi State Bulldogs

- Southeastern Conference: 2024

Individual

- First-team All-American: 2024
- First-team All-SEC: 2023, 2024
- SEC Midfielder of the Year: 2024
