= Angelina Anderson =

American soccer player (born 2001)

- Anderson with Angel City in 2026

Personal information
- Full name: Angelina Dora Anderson
- Date of birth: March 22, 2001 (age 25)
- Place of birth: San Ramon, California, U.S.
- Height: 6 ft 0 in (1.83 m)
- Position: Goalkeeper

Team information
- Current team: Angel City
- Number: 19

Youth career
- Mustang ECNL

College career
Years	Team	Apps	(Gls)
2019–2022	California Golden Bears	72	(0)

Senior career*
Years	Team	Apps	(Gls)
2023–	Angel City	59	(0)

International career^{‡}
2017–2018	United States U17		
2018–2019	United States U20		
2025	United States U23	1	(0)
- * Club domestic league appearances and goals as of 05:57, November 12, 2026 (UTC) ‡ National team caps and goals as of May 30, 2025

Angelina Dora Anderson (born March 22, 2001) is an American professional soccer player who plays as a goalkeeper for Angel City FC of the National Women's Soccer League (NWSL). She played college soccer for the California Golden Bears, earning second-team All-American honors as a freshman in 2019. She was drafted by Angel City in the third round of the 2023 NWSL Draft.

== Early life and college career ==
Anderson was raised in Danville, California, where she attended Carondelet High School and played club soccer for Mustang ECNL.

=== California Golden Bears ===
Anderson attended the University of California, Berkeley, where she made 72 appearances and recorded 242 saves. Her freshman year, she was named Pac-12 Goalkeeper of the Year, Freshman of the Year, and second-team All-American. She was named team captain her sophomore year, a position she retained for the rest of her college career. Her senior year, she played all 21 games and recorded a .88 goals against average. She also received the Freshman of the Year award from TopDrawerSoccer.com.

== Club career ==
=== Angel City FC ===
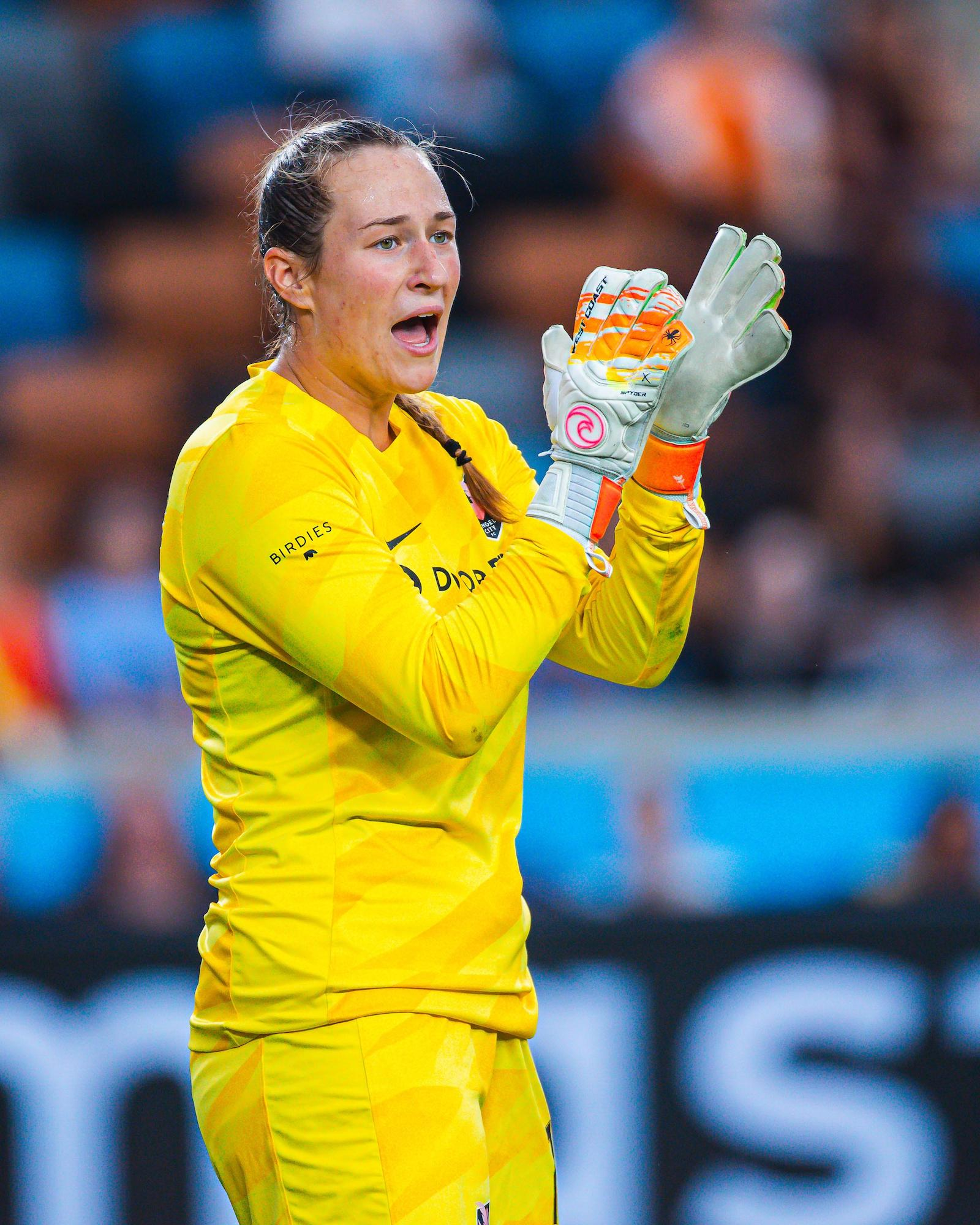
Anderson playing for Angel City in 2023

Angel City FC selected Anderson 27th overall in the 2023 NWSL Draft. She made her professional debut in a Challenge Cup match against the Portland Thorns on July 29, 2023, saving a penalty kick by Olivia Moultrie. She would go on to make four regular-season appearances in 2023 as well as starting in Angel City's first playoff appearance against OL Reign where she became the first rookie goalkeeper to play in the NWSL playoffs since the 2013 inaugural season.

After her impressive performances in her rookie season, Anderson began her second season with Angel City as the first-string goalkeeper, starting in the season opener against Bay FC. After three appearances (two losses and one draw), DiDi Haračić replaced her as the starter for the rest of the year.

== International career ==
Anderson received her first call-up to the United States senior national team in January 2025. On May 21, 2025, Anderson was called up to the under-23 team for a set of friendlies against Germany.

== Career statistics ==
=== Club ===
As of May 2, 2026

Appearances and goals by club, season and competition
Club	Season	League			Cup (Note: Includes the NWSL Challenge Cup.)		Playoffs (Note: Includes NWSL Playoffs.)		Total	
Club	Season	Division	Apps	Goals	Apps	Goals	Apps	Goals	Apps	Goals
Angel City FC	2023	NWSL	4	0	1	0	1	0	6	0
Angel City FC	2024	NWSL	3	0	2	0	—		5	0
Angel City FC	2025	NWSL	22	0	—		—		22	0
Angel City FC	2026	NWSL	6	0	—		—		6	0
Career total			35	0	3	0	1	0	39	0

== Honors ==
Individual

- Second-team All-American: 2019
- Pac-12 Goalkeeper of the Year: 2019
- Pac-12 Freshman of the Year: 2019
- First-team All-Pac-12: 2019
- Second-team All-Pac-12: 2020
- All-Pac-12 Academic Honor Roll: 2020, 2021
