= Riley Tiernan =

American soccer player (born 2002)

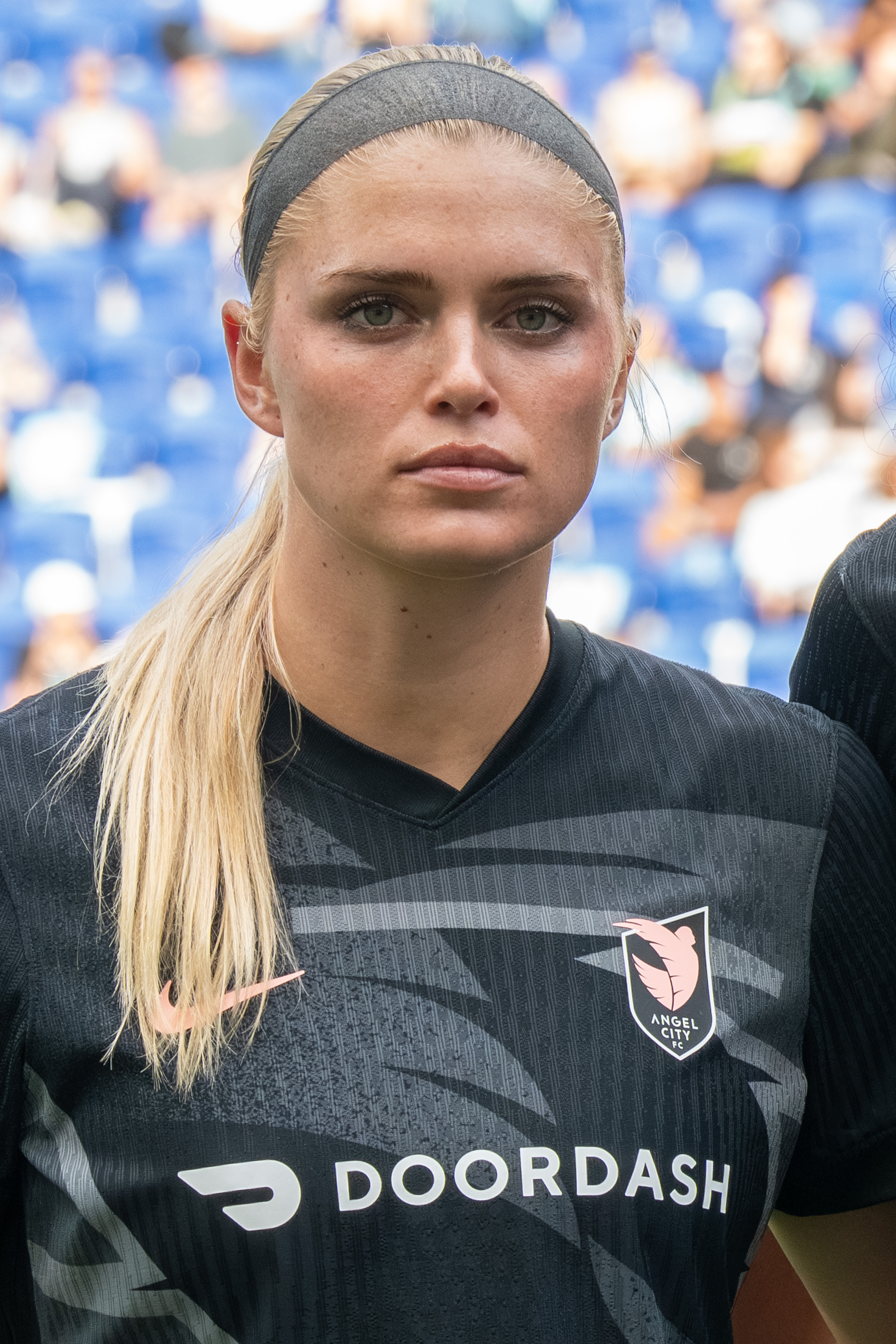
- Tiernan with Angel City in 2025

Personal information
- Full name: Riley Shea Tiernan
- Date of birth: November 14, 2002 (age 23)
- Place of birth: Voorhees, New Jersey, United States
- Height: 5 ft 8 in (1.73 m)
- Position: Forward

Team information
- Current team: Angel City
- Number: 33

College career
Years	Team	Apps	(Gls)
2021–2024	Rutgers Scarlet Knights	83	(19)

Senior career*
Years	Team	Apps	(Gls)
2025–	Angel City	49	(10)

International career^{‡}
2025–	United States U-23	4	(0)
- * Club domestic league appearances and goals as of 06:12, November 12, 2026 (UTC) ‡ National team caps and goals as of December 2, 2025

Riley Shea Tiernan (born November 14, 2002) is an American professional soccer player who plays as a forward for Angel City FC of the National Women's Soccer League (NWSL). She played college soccer for the Rutgers Scarlet Knights, where she was named Big Ten Freshman of the Year and All-Big Ten four times.

== Early life ==
Tiernan was raised in Voorhees Township, New Jersey, one of three children born to Robin and Joe Tiernan. Her older sister, Madison, played college soccer at Rutgers and professionally for Sky Blue FC before becoming an assistant coach at Rutgers during Riley's sophomore season. Tiernan began playing club soccer with PDA at age nine. She played four years of prep soccer at Eastern Regional High School, winning the Group IV state championship in 2018 and being named the Courier-Post Player of the Year and United Soccer Coaches high school All-American in 2020.

== College career ==
Tiernan started all 25 games in her freshman season with the Rutgers Scarlet Knights in 2021. She helped Rutgers go 10–0 to win the Big Ten Conference regular-season title and then reached the final of the Big Ten tournament. In the NCAA tournament, she had four goals and two assists, including one of each in their 2–2 quarterfinal draw (and shootout win) against Alabama to send Rutgers to the national semifinals for the second time in program history, where they lost to Florida State. She finished her freshman season with 8 goals and 13 assists and was named the Big Ten Freshman of the Year and first-team All-Big Ten.

Following her freshman season, Tiernan became one of the first five student-athletes to sign a name, image, and likeness (NIL) deal with Rutgers's NIL collective. She started all 20 games in her sophomore season in 2022 and scored 4 goals with 6 assists, earning third-team All-Big Ten honors. In her junior season in 2023, she started all 20 games and scored 3 assists with 4 goals, being named second-team All-Big Ten. She returned to a double-digit points total in her senior season in 2024, scoring 4 goals and providing 11 assists in 18 games, and was named third-team All-Big Ten. She had two assists during the Big Ten tournament as Rutgers reached the final, but she was suspended for that game after picking up a red card in the semifinal against USC. She left Rutgers as the program career assist leader with 34 assists in 83 games.

== Club career ==
=== Angel City ===
Tiernan joined Angel City FC as a non-roster trialist in the 2025 preseason and performed well in the preseason Coachella Valley Invitational. On March 3, 2025, the club announced that they had signed Tiernan to her first professional contract, a two-year deal with a club option for another year. She made her professional debut on March 16, starting and playing the full 90 minutes in the season-opening 1–1 draw with the San Diego Wave. On March 30, she scored her first professional goal with the eventual winner in a 2–1 victory over the Seattle Reign, Angel City's first win of the season. In the following match on April 12, she made her first professional assist and scored again in a 3–1 win against the Houston Dash. On May 2, she scored her first professional brace, with her second goal marking the stoppage-time game winner in a 4–3 victory over Washington Spirit.

Tiernan was named NWSL Rookie of the Month twice for her performances in April and May. She was also named to the NWSL Best XI of the Month for May as she was tied for third in the Golden Boot race with six goals in her first ten games. Her scoring cooled off somewhat as she finished her rookie season with 8 goals in 26 games. She led her team and all rookies in scoring and was tied for sixth in the league, and she was one of two rookies to start every game of the season.

== International career ==
Tiernan was called into training camp with the United States under-20 team in December 2021. After her impressive performances during her rookie season with Angel City, Tiernan was called up to represent the United States with the under-23 team on May 21, 2025. Tiernan made her debut with the U-23 team coming on as a substitute in a 2–1 victory against Germany on May 30, 2025.

== Career statistics ==
As of November 2, 2025

Appearances and goals by club, season and competition
Club	Season	League			Playoffs (Note: Includes NWSL Playoffs)		Total	
Club	Season	Division	Apps	Goals	Apps	Goals	Apps	Goals
Angel City FC	2025	NWSL	26	8	—		26	8
Career total			26	8	0	0	26	8

== Honors and awards ==
Rutgers Scarlet Knights

- Big Ten Conference: 2021

Individual

- NWSL Team of the Month: May 2025
- NWSL Rookie of the Month: April 2025, May 2025
- First-team All-Big Ten: 2021
- Second-team All-Big Ten: 2023
- Third-team All-Big Ten: 2022, 2024
- Big Ten Freshman of the Year: 2021
