= Becki Tweed =

English football manager and former player

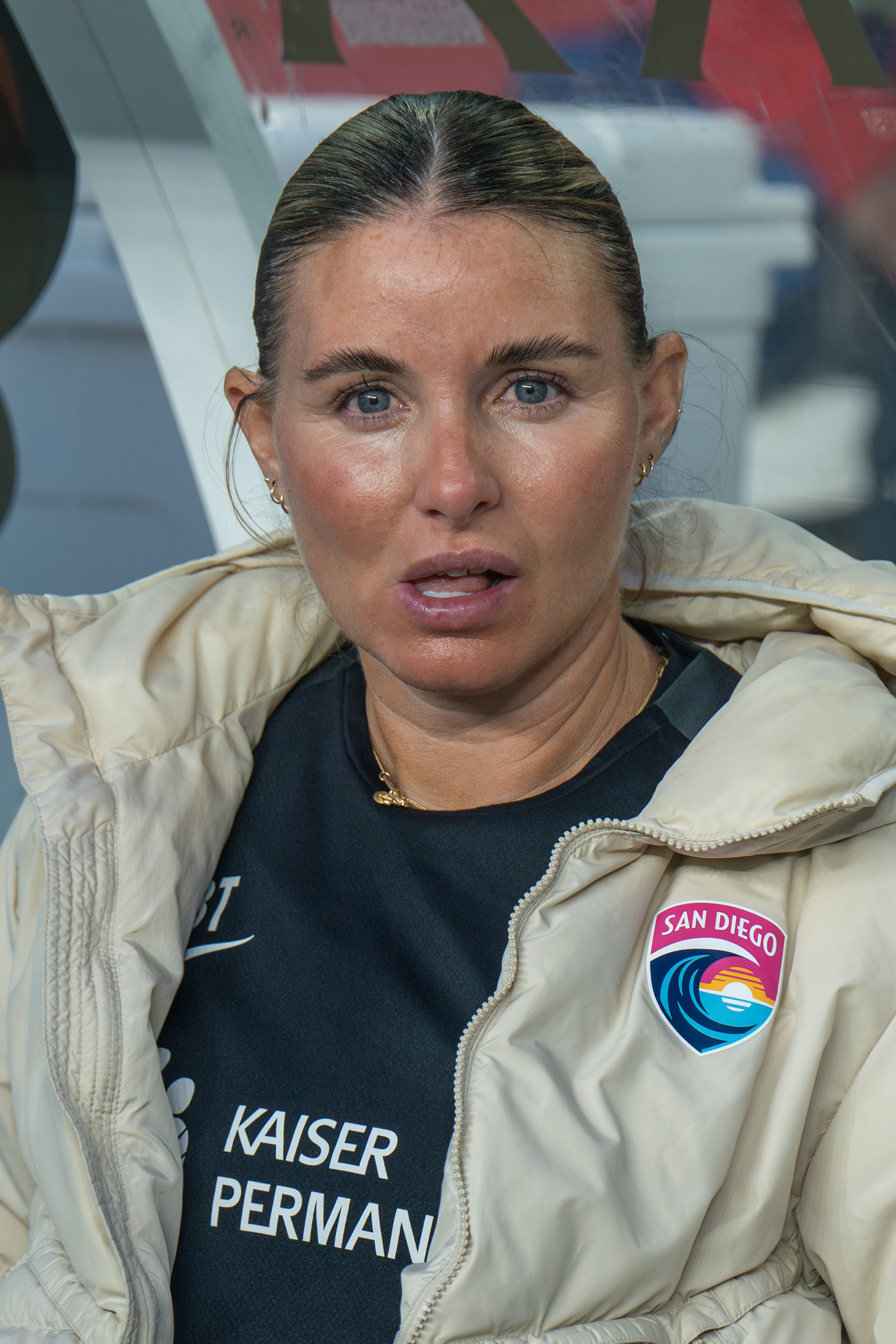
- Tweed with San Diego Wave FC in 2026

Personal information
- Full name: Rebecca Susan Tweed
- Place of birth: Bristol, England

Team information
- Current team: San Diego Wave FC (assistant coach)

Senior career*
Years	Team	Apps	(Gls)
2005–2008	Bristol City		
2008–2009	Millwall		
2009–2010	Bristol Academy		
- Jersey Blues (WPSL)
2011–2015	Millburn Magic		
2020	Sky Blue FC	0	(0)

Managerial career
- 2017–2020: Monmouth Hawks (assistant)
- 2020–2023: NJ/NY Gotham FC (assistant)
- 2021: Gotham Reserves
- 2022–2023: United States U20
- 2023: Angel City FC (assistant)
- 2023: Angel City FC (interim)
- 2024: Angel City FC
- 2025–: San Diego Wave FC (assistant)
- * Club domestic league appearances and goals

Rebecca Susan Tweed is an English women's football manager and former player who currently serves as an assistant coach for San Diego Wave FC of the National Women's Soccer League (NWSL). She previously served as the head coach of Angel City FC and an assistant coach for the United States women's national under-20 soccer team, as well as an assistant coach and interim head coach of NJ/NY Gotham FC from 2020-2023.

== Playing career ==
Tweed played professionally for six years in the FA Women's Premier League for Bristol City and Millwall. She then moved to the United States and played for Women's Premier Soccer League (WPSL) teams Jersey Blues FC and Millburn Magic.

On 10 October 2020, Tweed — serving as assistant coach for Sky Blue FC — also dressed as a bench player for a match against Chicago Red Stars in the 2020 NWSL Fall Series, wearing squad number 29 and rostered as a midfielder. She did not appear in the match. As a result, her playing rights in the NWSL were made available in the 2020 NWSL Expansion Draft.

Tweed has also played for England's national teams at the youth level.

== Managerial career ==
=== Monmouth University ===
Tweed joined Monmouth University as an assistant coach in 2017.

=== Sky Blue FC (NJ/NY Gotham FC), 2020–2023 ===
Tweed joined Sky Blue FC in March 2020 as an assistant coach to head coach Freya Coombe after sending her resume to the club. After Coombe left to manage Angel City FC mid-season in 2021, Coombe's replacement Scott Parkinson retained Tweed as an assistant. On 4 September 2021, newly appointed Parkinson was unavailable to coach a match against Chicago Red Stars due to a personal matter, and the club — now named NJ/NY Gotham FC — named Tweed as interim head coach. Gotham drew the match against Chicago 0–0. Following Parkinson's firing during the 2022 season, Tweed and fellow assistant coach Bev Yanez led training until the appointment of interim head coach Hue Menzies, who retained Tweed as an assistant.

Tweed was also co-head coach of the Gotham Reserves WPSL team created in 2021, partnering with Eleri Earnshaw. The team won the 2021 WPSL Metropolitan South conference championship in a perfect season, and the WPSL named Tweed and Earnshaw conference Coaches of the Year for that season.

=== Angel City FC, 2023–2024 ===
On 11 January 2023, Angel City FC hired Tweed as an assistant coach, reuniting Tweed with former Sky Blue FC head coach Freya Coombe and Gotham Reserves co-head coach Eleri Earnshaw. On 14 June, Angel City fired Coombe at the halfway point of the 2023 season and named Tweed the club's interim head coach.

Under Tweed's management, Angel City made the NWSL Playoffs and only dropped one game as a loss. On 2 November 2023, Angel City announced that it had removed the interim tag from Tweed and named her the club's permanent head coach after leading the team to an 8-2-5 mark across all competitions. Tweed was nominated for NWSL Coach of the Year—the first time an interim coach has made the shortlist.

On 9 December 2024 Angel City announced that Tweed had departed the club.

=== San Diego Wave FC, 2025– ===
Following her departure from Angel City, Tweed joined San Diego Wave FC as an assistant coach under manager Jonas Eidevall. Her appointment was announced on 31 January 2025. Following a one-game suspension to Eidevall, Tweed served as interim head coach for San Diego on May 10, 2026, leading the Wave to a 2–1 victory over Tweed's former team, Angel City.

=== International ===
Tweed serves as assistant coach for the United States women's national under-20 soccer team. She was part of the coaching staff for the team at the 2022 FIFA U-20 Women's World Cup, Sud Ladies Cup, and 2023 CONCACAF Women's U-20 Championship.
