= Miyabi Moriya =

Japanese footballer (born 1996)

Miyabi Moriya 守屋 都弥
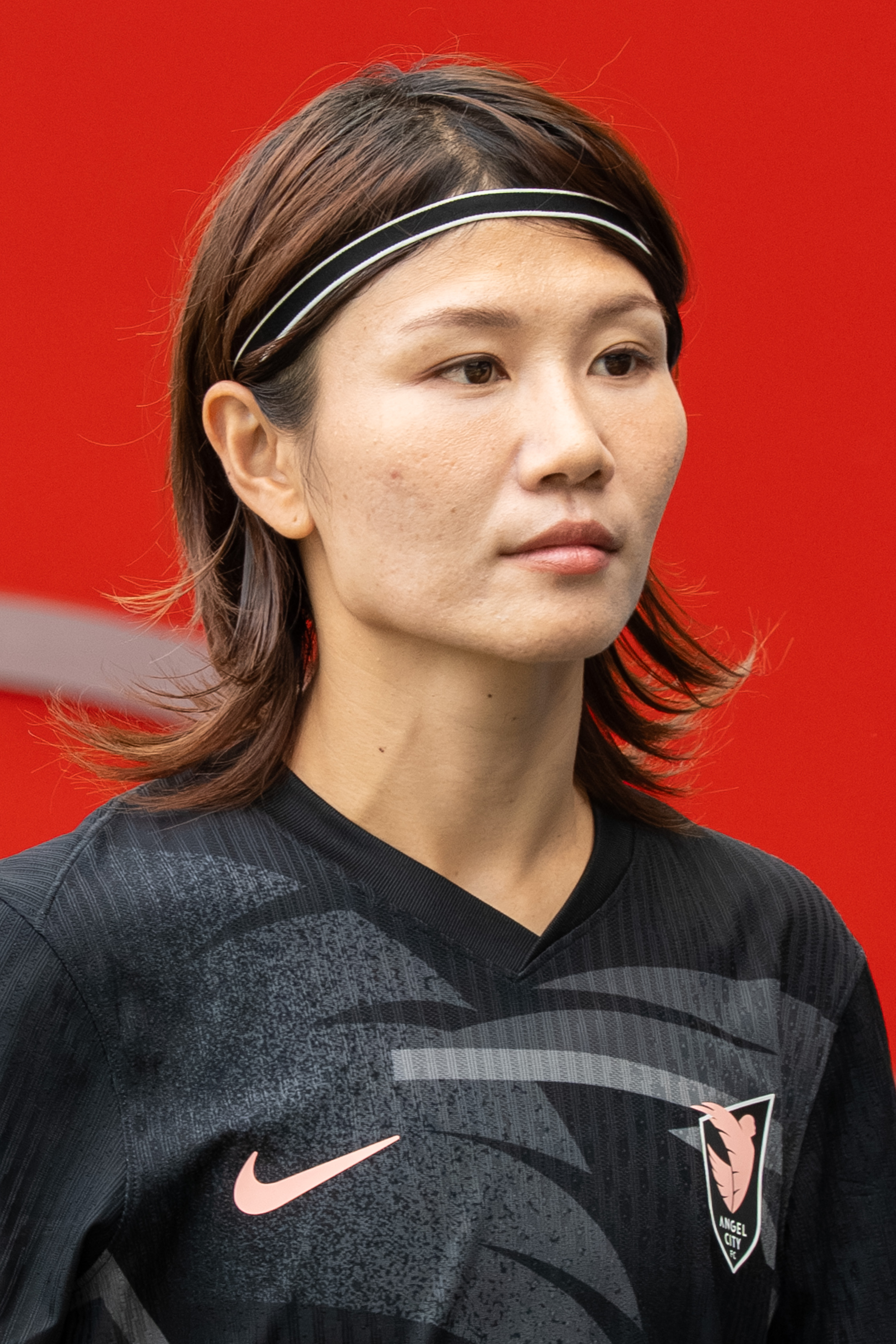
- Moriya with Angel City FC in 2025

Personal information
- Date of birth: 22 August 1996 (age 30)
- Place of birth: Kanmaki, Kitakatsuragi, Nara Prefecture, Japan
- Height: 1.64 m (5 ft 5 in)
- Position: Right back

Team information
- Current team: Utah Royals
- Number: 22

Youth career
- 2009–2014: JFA Academy Fukushima

Senior career*
Years	Team	Apps	(Gls)
2015–2025	INAC Kobe Leonessa	122	(8)
2025	Angel City	25	(1)
2026–	Utah Royals	24	(1)

International career^{‡}
2023–	Japan	29	(2)
Medal record
Women's football
Representing Japan
AFC Women's Asian Cup
Winner	2026 Australia
- * Club domestic league appearances and goals as of 04:22, 10 November 2026 (UTC) ‡ National team caps and goals as of 07:29, 20 April 2026 (UTC)

Miyabi Moriya (守屋 都弥, Moriya Miyabi; born 22 August 1996) is a Japanese professional footballer who plays as a right back for the Utah Royals of the National Women's Soccer League (NWSL) and the Japan national team. She previously played for WE League club INAC Kobe Leonessa and NWSL club Angel City FC.

== Club career ==
=== INAC Kobe Leonessa ===
Moriya made her WE League debut on 26 September 2021. Since making her professional debut in 2015, Moriya scored eight goals in 118 match appearances for INAC Kobe Leonessa of the Japanese WE League, helping the club win their first ever WE League title in 2022. In the 2023 season, Moriya was awarded 2023 WE League Valuable Player and was also named to the 2023 WE League Best XI.

=== Angel City FC ===
On 31 January 2025, Angel City FC of the National Women's Soccer League announced they had acquired Moriya for an undisclosed fee and signed her to a one-year contract with a club option for 2026. Moriya made her debut for Angel City on 16 March, coming on a substitute in the home opener against San Diego Wave FC to close out the match and secure a 1–1 draw. Moriya recorded her first assist for Angel City on 1 September 2025, delivering a corner kick which was headed in by teammate Maiara Niehues, which was the eventual game winner to secure a 2–1 win over Bay FC. After making 25 appearances in her first season in the NWSL, Moriya departed from Angel City upon the expiration of her contract.

=== Utah Royals ===
On 2 December 2025, fellow NWSL club Utah Royals signed Moriya to a one-year, salary cap-exempt contract through the end of 2026.

== International career ==
On 13 June 2023, she was included in the 23-player squad for the FIFA Women's World Cup 2023. On July 26, 2023, she made her first World Cup appearance in Japan's second-round 2–0 victory over Costa Rica in the 2023 FIFA Women's World Cup Group C.

On 14 June 2024, Moriya was included in the Japan squad for the 2024 Summer Olympics.

Moriya was a part of the Japan squad that competed at the 2025 SheBelieves Cup where Japan defeated the hosts, the United States in a 2–1 victory on February 26, 2025, to win the SheBelieves Cup for the first time.

== Career statistics ==
=== International ===
As of match played 18 April 2026

Appearances and goals by national team and year
National Team	Year	Apps	Goals
Japan	2023	6	2
Japan	2024	9	0
Japan	2025	7	0
Japan	2026	7	0
Total		29	2

Scores and results list Japan's goal tally first, score column indicates score after each Moriya goal.

List of international goals scored by Miyabi Moriya
No.	Date	Venue	Opponent	Score	Result	Competition
1	26 October 2023	Lokomotiv Stadium, Tashkent, Uzbekistan	India	5–0	7–0	2024 AFC Women's Olympic Qualifying Tournament
2	1 November 2023	Lokomotiv Stadium, Tashkent, Uzbekistan	Vietnam	2–0	2–0	2024 AFC Women's Olympic Qualifying Tournament

== Honours ==
INAC Kobe Leonessa

- Empress's Cup: 2015, 2016
- WE League: 2021–22
- WE League Cup: 2022–23

Japan

- AFC Women's Asian Cup: 2026
- SheBelieves Cup: 2025

Individual

- WE League Best XI: 2022–23
- WE League Valuable Player Award: 2022–23
