= Alexander Straus =

Norwegian football coach (born 1975)

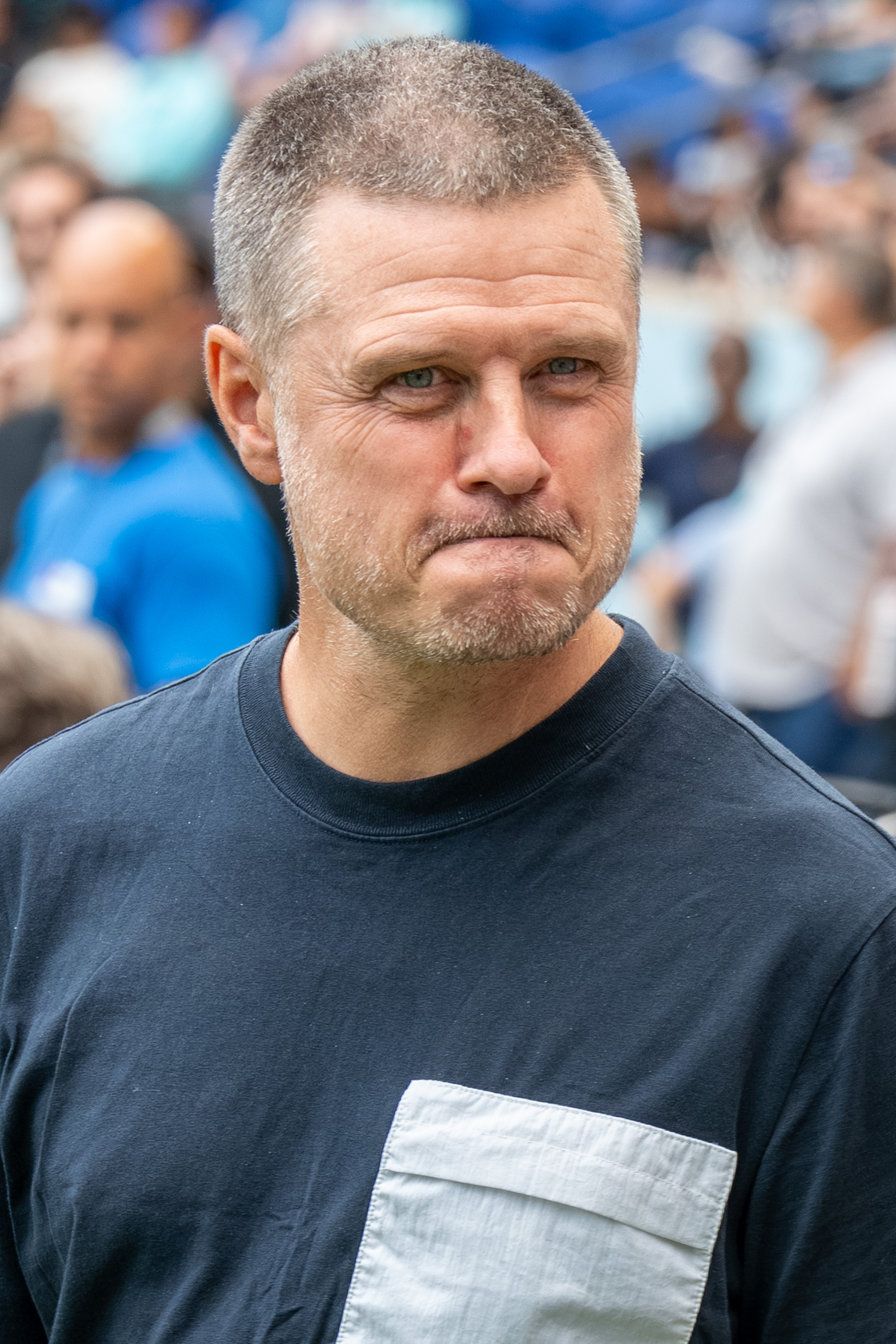
- Straus with Angel City in 2025

Personal information
- Date of birth: 20 October 1975 (age 51)
- Place of birth: Bergen

Senior career*
Years	Team	Apps	(Gls)
–2010	Varegg		

Managerial career
- 2010: Varegg
- 2013: Nest-Sotra (assistant)
- 2013–14: Nest-Sotra
- 2014–17: Strømsgodset (assistant)
- 2018: Sandviken
- 2018–2020: Norway U23
- 2019–2020: Norway U19
- 2020–2022: Brann
- 2022–2025: Bayern Munich
- 2025–2026: Angel City
- * Club domestic league appearances and goals

Alexander Straus (born 20 October 1975) is a Norwegian football coach who was most recently the head coach of National Women's Soccer League (NWSL) club Angel City FC.

== Career ==
He started his coaching career in Varegg. He was an active player in the same club.

Straus was wanted as assistant coach for Nest-Sotra in 2013. The club had at the time David Nielsen as head coach. And Straus accepted the job. The two coaches lead the club in their promotion to First Division from Second Division. After that, Nielsen was wanted as Ronny Deila's assistant in Strømsgodset, so Straus became the head coach for Nest-Sotra in their first season in First Division.

In 2014, David Nielsen became the head coach for Strømsgodset. And again, Straus was wanted as assistant coach. Straus accepted the job. In total, he worked for the club for 3.5 year, first as assistant coach, then as head of youth development.

In 2018, Straus became the head coach for Sandviken in Toppserien. With Straus as coach, the team came to their first cup finale since 1995 and came fourth in the league.

The autumn 2018, Straus was hired as head coach for Norway women's national under-23 team. From the Summer of 2019, he also became the coach for Norway national under-19 team.

In September 2020 it became official that Straus again was going to be the head coach for Sandviken. In 2021, the club won Toppserien for the first time, in addition to reaching the cup finale. Before the 2022 season, it was decided that Sandviken should be a part of SK Brann, and Straus, therefore, was Brann Kvinner's first head coach.

In June 2022, it became official that Straus was the new head coach for Bayern München. During his time at the club, Bayern won three consecutive Frauen-Bundesliga titles and the 2024 DFB-Supercup.

On 18 April 2025, hours after announcing his departure from Bayern München at the end of the 2024–25 season, it was confirmed that Straus was to become head coach for National Women's Soccer League club Angel City FC, officially joining from 1 June. He spent one year in Los Angeles before being fired in June 2026 after Angel City won only one of their last eight games before the midseason break.
