= Eleri Earnshaw =

Welsh footballer (born 1985)

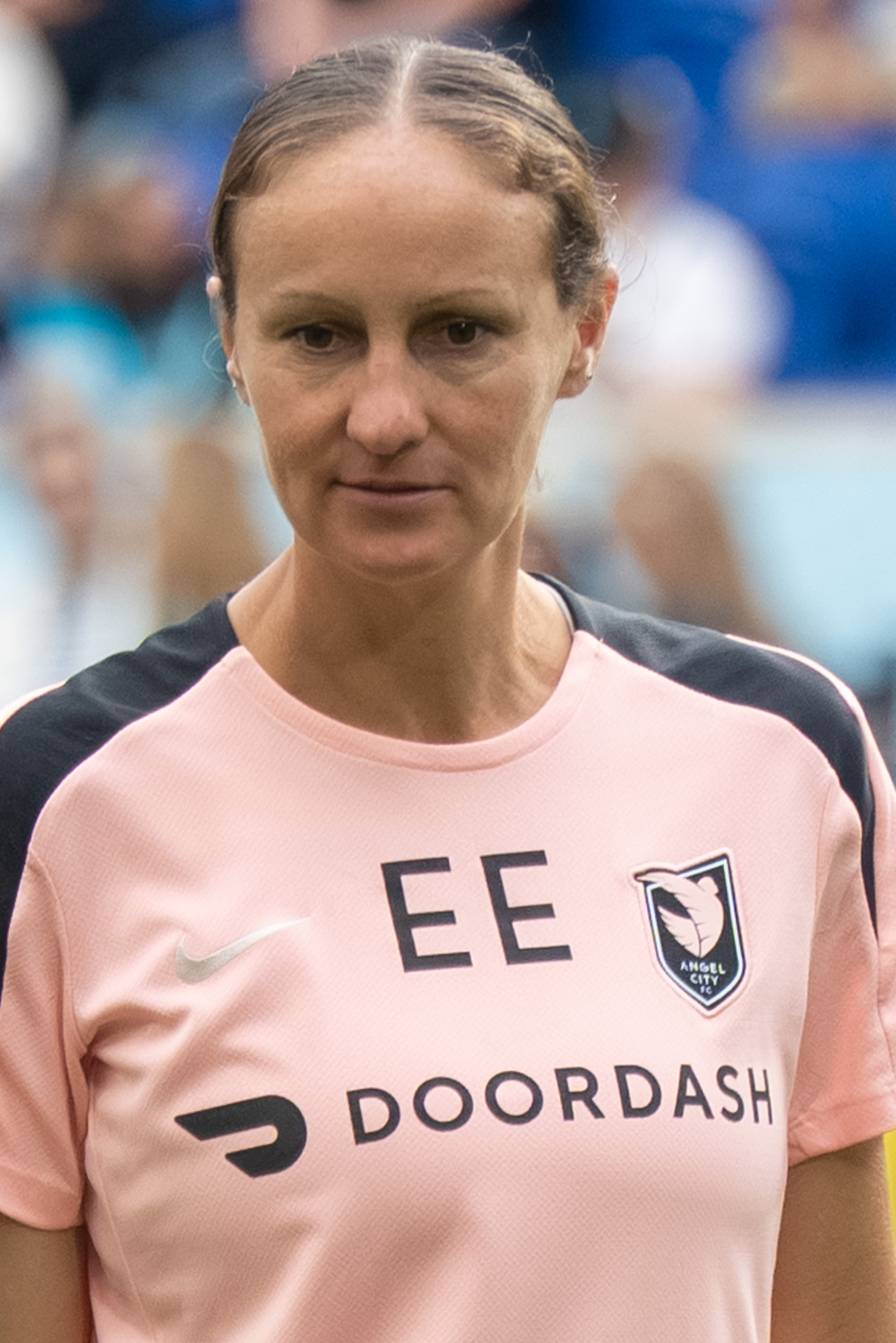
- Earnshaw with Angel City in 2025

Personal information
- Full name: Eleri Earnshaw
- Date of birth: 17 May 1985 (age 41)
- Place of birth: St Asaph, Wales
- Height: 5 ft 5 in (1.65 m)
- Position: Midfielder

Team information
- Current team: Canadian Women's National Soccer Team (Assistant Coach)

College career
Years	Team	Apps	(Gls)
2004–2006	Iona Gaels		
2007	Long Island Blackbirds		

Senior career*
Years	Team	Apps	(Gls)
2000–2001	Bangor City Girls		
2001–2004	Arsenal Ladies		
2002–2003	→ Barnet (loan)		
2005–2008	New York Magic		
2009	New York Athletic Club		
2010	SoccerPlus Connecticut		

International career
2002–2010	Wales	21	(0)

Managerial career
- 2008–2009: Long Island Blackbirds (graduate assistant)
- 2010–2014: SoccerPlus Elite (director of coaching)
- 2011–2013: Central Connecticut Blue Devils (assistant)
- 2014–2016: Yale Bulldogs (assistant)
- 2017–2018: LIU Brooklyn Blackbirds
- 2019: LIU Sharks
- 2017–2021: Downtown United Soccer Club
- 2020–2021: Fordham Rams (assistant)
- 2021: NJ/NY Gotham FC Reserves
- 2022: Angel City FC (performance analyst)
- 2023: Angel City FC (assistant)
- 2024–: Angel City FC (first assistant)
- * Club domestic league appearances and goals

Eleri Earnshaw (born 17 May 1985) is a Welsh football coach and former player who is the assistant coach for Angel City FC of the National Women's Soccer League (NWSL). She was previously the acting head coach and assistant coach of the Fordham Rams women's soccer team; co-head coach of NJ/NY Gotham FC Reserves in 2021, leading them to a Women's Premier Soccer League conference championship and earning conference Coach of the Year honors; head coach of LIU Sharks women's soccer; and an assistant coach for Central Connecticut and Yale.

In her playing career, Earnshaw played as a defender and midfielder for the Welsh national team, the New York Magic, and Arsenal, and accumulated more than twenty caps for Wales.

== Club career ==
Earnshaw attended Ysgol Glan Clwyd and also played for Bangor City Girls in the FA Women's Premier League Northern Division. In November 2000, a 15-year-old Earnshaw scored twice against Charlton Athletic in an FA Women's Premier League Cup tie. She won a scholarship to Arsenal Ladies' Academy in September 2001.

After spending a period with Barnet in 2002–03, Earnshaw helped Arsenal win a domestic double in 2003–04.

She then moved to the US to play varsity soccer while attending Iona College (New York). After three successful seasons with The Gaels, Earnshaw moved to Long Island University for a final season of college soccer in 2007.

== International career ==
Earnshaw won 13 caps and scored three goals for Wales at U–19 level. She made her senior debut, aged 17 and two days, in a 2–0 defeat to Scotland in May 2002.
