= Hannah Seabert =

American soccer player

- Seabert with Angel City FC in 2026

Personal information
- Full name: Hannah Grace Seabert
- Date of birth: February 27, 1995 (age 31)
- Place of birth: Redlands, California, U.S.
- Height: 1.77 m (5 ft 10 in)
- Position: Goalkeeper

College career
Years	Team	Apps	(Gls)
2013–2016	Pepperdine Waves	82	(0)

Senior career*
Years	Team	Apps	(Gls)
2017	Orlando Pride	0	(0)
2018–2019	Fortuna Hjørring	33	(0)
2019–2021	Vålerenga	23	(0)
2022–2025	Sporting CP	21	(0)
2025–2026	Angel City	5	(0)
- * Club domestic league appearances and goals as of 04:44, November 2, 2026 (UTC)

Hannah Grace Seabert is an American former professional soccer player who played as a goalkeeper.

== Honors ==
Vålerenga

- Toppserien: 2023
- Norwegian Women's Cup: 2021
