= Angel City FC =

National Women's Soccer League team in Los Angeles, California

Angel City
- Full name: Angel City Football Club
- Founded: July 21, 2020; 6 years ago
- Stadium: BMO Stadium; Los Angeles, California
- Capacity: 22,000
- President: Julie Uhrman
- Interim head coach: Leif Gunnar Smerud
- League: National Women's Soccer League
- 2026: Regular season: 5th of 16; Playoffs: Quarter-finals
- Website: angelcity.com
Home colors	Away colors

Angel City Football Club is an American professional soccer team based in Los Angeles that competes in the National Women's Soccer League (NWSL). The formation of the team was announced on July 21, 2020; it began play in the 2022 season. Its best season to date was 2023, when it made the playoffs but lost in the first round. The team plays its home games at BMO Stadium.

Angel City FC is the Los Angeles area's first women's professional soccer team since the Los Angeles Sol of Women's Professional Soccer folded in 2010. The team has many high-profile owners, including Lilly Singh, Natalie Portman, America Ferrera, Mia Hamm, Abby Wambach, Eva Longoria, and controlling owners Bob Iger and Willow Bay.

== History ==
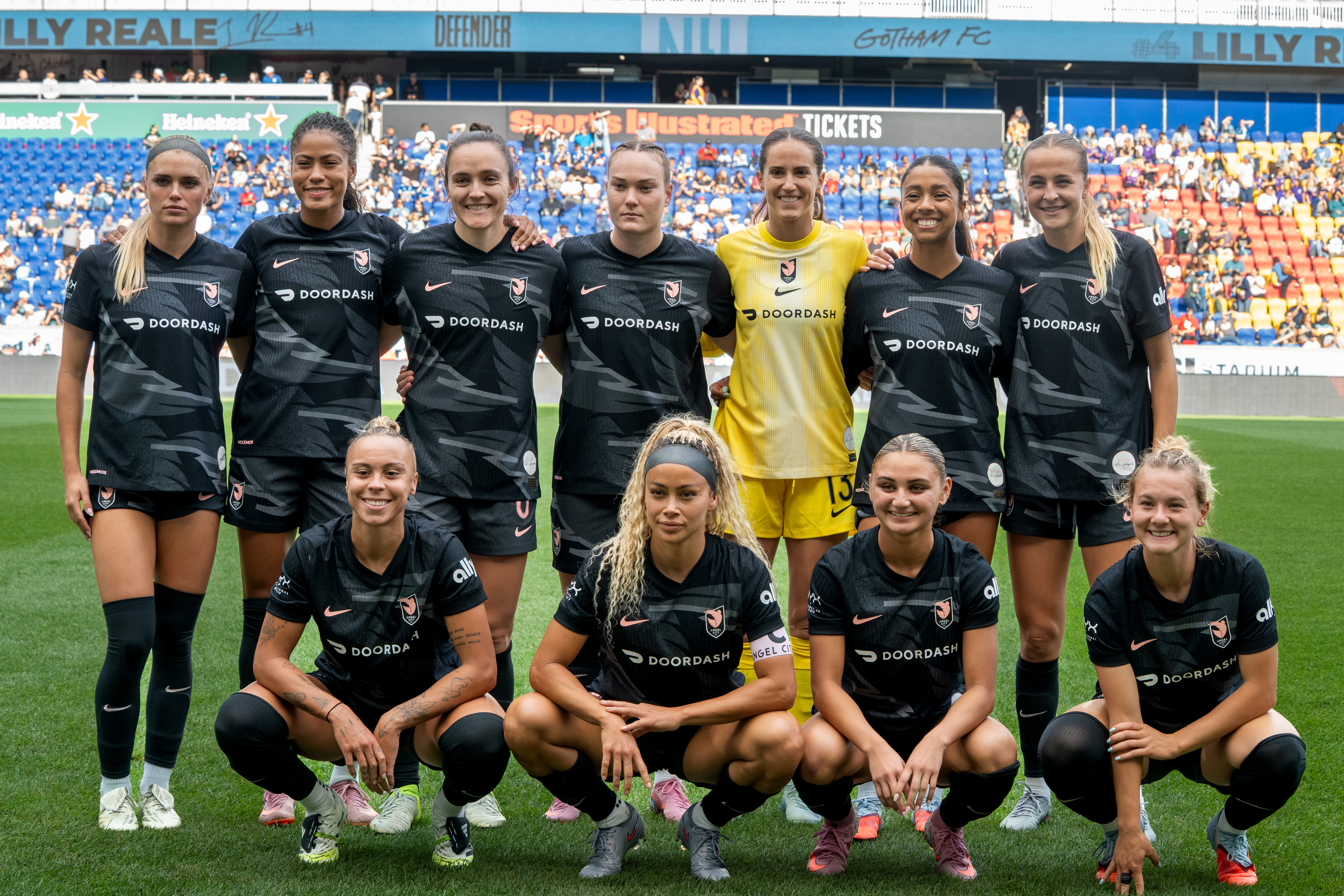
Angel City FC starting XI against Gotham FC on 7 Sep 2025

On July 21, 2020, the NWSL announced that Los Angeles would be awarded an expansion franchise for the 2022 season. The team was announced with a majority female ownership group led by actress Natalie Portman, venture capitalist Kara Nortman, entrepreneur Julie Uhrman, and venture capitalist Alexis Ohanian. Ohanian also represents the club on the league's board of governors. Other founding members of the team included professional tennis player Serena Williams, actors Uzo Aduba, Jessica Chastain, America Ferrera, Jennifer Garner, and Eva Longoria, late night talk show host and YouTuber Lilly Singh, YouTuber Casey Neistat, Broadway producer Jenna Segal, and former members of the United States national team including Julie Foudy, Mia Hamm, Rachel Van Hollebeke, Shannon Boxx, Amanda Cromwell, Lorrie Fair, Ronnie Fair, Joy Fawcett, Angela Hucles, Shannon MacMillan, Tisha Venturini, Saskia Webber, Lauren Holiday, and Abby Wambach.

It was also announced during the team's launch that they would be announcing their official name before the end of the year but were going to use 'Angel City' as a tentative nickname. The team was also in discussions with various groups for a stadium agreement, including the LA Galaxy of Major League Soccer.

In the time since the club's name was confirmed as Angel City FC on October 21, 2020, additional members of the ownership group were announced, among them tennis great Billie Jean King, former tennis player and current tennis administrator Ilana Kloss, WNBA star Candace Parker, NHL star P. K. Subban, actress and activist Sophia Bush, Latin pop star Becky G, actor and TV host James Corden, former U.S. men's international soccer star Cobi Jones, NFL offensive lineman Ryan Kalil, and actor Uzo Aduba.

Angel City FC began NWSL regular-season play on April 29, 2022 with Freya Coombe as head coach. They finished the year with 29 points, good for 8th place in the 12-team league.

Angel City FC hosted Mexican club Tigres UANL Femenil in the club's first-ever International Friendly match in August 2022, which Angel City FC won 1-0. The first edition of the Copa Angelina on September 5, 2022 saw Angel City FC fall 2-0 to the Mexico women's national team off a goal by Scarlett Camberos and an own goal.

A three-part documentary chronicling the team's first season entitled Angel City was released in May 2023 on HBO.

The 2023 season was marked by the departure of head coach Freya Coombe on June 14 following a 2–6–3 (W-L-D) start to the season, with Angel City in 11th place out of 12 teams. Assistant coach Becki Tweed became interim head coach and guided the team to a 5th-place finish, earning its first, and to date only, playoff berth. In the first round of the playoffs, on 20 October 2023, they lost to OL Reign. On 30 October 2023, Tweed was named the club's permanent head coach.

In July 2024, it was reported that the CEO of the Walt Disney Company, Bob Iger, and his wife, Willow Bay, were close to purchasing Angel City FC's franchise, with the intention of becoming the team’s majority shareholder for upwards of $250 million. The deal was officially announced by the club on July 17, 2024, with Iger and Bay investing $50 million into the club to become the majority shareholders; the $250 million valuation made Angel City the most valuable women's sport team in the world. Portman, Uhrman, Ohanian and Gillian Berry will continue to serve on the club's board.

In the 2024 season, it was reported on October 3 that Angel City would be fined $200,000 and docked 3 points for violating the NWSL salary cap, lowering them to 12th place out of 14 teams. Team president and CEO Julie Uhrman and general manager Angela Hucles were also suspended "from conducting duties related to any player transactions" for the rest of 2024. The team finished with 24 points, including the 3-point deduction, and ended in 12th place out of 14 teams. Head coach Becki Tweed departed the club on 9 December 2024.

In January 2025, it was announced that Sam Laity was would be the new interim head coach. On June 1, ten games into the 2025 season, Alexander Straus took the reins as permanent head coach. The team finished the season with 27 points, good for 11th place out of 14 teams.

In the 2026 season, Alexander Straus was relieved of head-coaching duties on June 17 with a record of 4-6-1 (W-L-D) on the season. He was succeeded by interim head coach Leif Gunnar Smerud.

== Colors and crest ==
Angel City FC's official colors are "asphalt" and "armor" with "sol rosa" as an accent color, a pink-tinted hue unique to the club.

On June 30, 2021, the club revealed its crest featuring an angel with wings inspired by the Southern California red-tailed hawk and shaped to mimic the area's palm trees, with the top of the crest sloping at a 22-degree angle to represent their 2022 entry into the league. The crest was designed by Amedea Tassinari.

The club collaborated with supporters in the design of the colors, crest, and kit to ensure the club represented Los Angeles.

In October 2021, Angel City pre-emptively retired shirt number 22 to recognize its founding year and the number of players on the pitch during matches. The team sells shirts bearing the number 22 and donates 10 percent of revenue through a charitable program managed by the California Community Foundation.

On November 17, 2021, the club unveiled a black primary kit made of recycled materials called 'Dawn'. The kit's design features hints of the team's sol rosa color, an art deco pattern, and the team's motto "Volemos" above player names. Angel's City's first away kit, called 'Daylight', which was only used in their 2022 inaugural season, was unveiled in April 2022 ahead of their match against rivals San Diego Wave FC. The primarily white kit, with black and sol rosa palm details inspired by the palm trees of Los Angeles, was created by art director and graphic designer Matthew Wolff.

On March 16, 2023, Angel City released a new secondary kit featuring a print of the Los Angeles County coastline called 'Represent'.

Two new kits were unveiled on February 27, 2024 as part of a league-wide refresh. The black primary jersey, named 'Moonlight', places the wing from Angel City’s crest in a gritty asphalt-like texture over a black background, and an all sol rosa and pink secondary jersey named 'Sol'.

=== Kit history ===
2022–23 home	2024–25 home	2026 home

2022 away	2023 away	2024 away	2025 away

== Sponsorship and revenue ==
The club's eight-figure deal with DoorDash as the inaugural primary kit sponsor is the largest in the NWSL. Angel City also sold $6 million in merchandise in 2022 to lead the league. The club's revenue accounted for 38.75% of the NWSL's total revenue on the year. In 2023, Angel City's reported revenue was $31 million, nearly double the second-highest team.

Period	Kit manufacturer	Front sponsor	Back sponsor	Sleeve sponsor	Ref
2022–	Nike	DoorDash	Sprouts Farmers Market	Birdies	

== Stadium ==
In November 2020, it was announced the team would play its home matches at BMO Stadium in Exposition Park near Downtown Los Angeles. BMO Stadium, formerly named Banc of California Stadium until 2023, is also home to Los Angeles FC of Major League Soccer.

== Players ==
=== Current squad ===
As of November 20, 2026.

No.	Pos.	Nation	Player
2	FW	USA	Sydney Leroux
3	DF	USA	Savy King
4	DF	USA	Karsyn Cherry
6	DF	USA	Emily Sams
7	MF	JPN	Hina Sugita
8	MF	BRA	Ary Borges
10	FW	SCO	Claire Emslie
12	MF	BRA	Maiara Niehues
13	GK	USA	Hannah Seabert
14	MF	USA	Nealy Martin
15	MF	USA	Evelyn Shores
16	MF	USA	Carina Lageyre
17	MF	USA	Ally Sentnor
18	FW	JPN	Jun Endo
19	GK	USA	Angelina Anderson
20	DF	USA	Gisele Thompson
24	FW	ZAM	Prisca Chilufya
25	DF	USA	Sophia Mattice
28	FW	USA	Maddie DiMaria
30	GK	USA	Faith Nguyen
32	FW	ISL	Sveindís Jane Jónsdóttir
33	FW	USA	Riley Tiernan
40	MF	USA	Jennie Immethun
99	MF	USA	Taylor Suarez

==== Out on loan ====
No.	Pos.	Nation	Player
27	FW	COL	Maithé López (on loan to Vancouver Rise FC until December 31, 2026)

=== Former players ===
For details of former players, see Category:Angel City FC players and List of Angel City FC players.

== Staff ==
=== Current staff ===
As of June 17, 2026.

Executive
President	Julie Uhrman
Sporting Director	Mark Parsons
Assistant General Manager	Matt Wade
Head of Recruitment	Tony Vigil
Coaching
Interim head Coach	Leif Gunnar Smerud
Senior Assistant Coach	Sam Laity
Senior Assistant Coach	Eleri Earnshaw
Head of Goalkeeping	Kevin Moreno
Technical Assistant Coach	Cassidy Chriest
Performance Analyst	Oliver Blitz
Performance Analyst	Yuma Moriya
Technical Staff
Technical Director	Mark Wilson
Senior Director of Soccer Operations	Marisa Leconte
Director of Player Care	Chelsea Rodriguez
Soccer Operations Coordinator	Alrick Drummond
Head Equipment Manager	Brock Chartier
Director of Medical and Performance	Sarah Smith
Head of Sports Science	Dan Jones
Physical Performance Coach	Michael Roman
Head Athletic Trainer	Manny De Alba
Director of Rehabilitation	Sarah Neal
Assistant Athletic Trainer	April Seymon
Physical Therapist	Joscelyn Shumate Bourne

== Records ==
=== Year-by-year ===
Season	League	Regular season								Playoffs	Challenge Cup	Summer Cup	Avg. attendance
Season	League	P	W	D	L	GF	GA	Pts	Pos	Playoffs	Challenge Cup	Summer Cup	Avg. attendance
2022	NWSL	22	8	5	9	23	27	29	8th	did not qualify	Group Stage	—	19,105 (highest)
2023	NWSL	22	8	7	7	31	30	31	5th	Quarterfinals (first round)	Group Stage	—	19,756 (second-highest)
2024	NWSL	26	7	6	13	29	42	24 (Note: Angel City FC were deducted three points for breaching spending cap rules.)	12th	did not qualify	did not qualify	Semifinals	19,313 (second-highest)
2025	NWSL	26	7	6	13	31	41	27	11th	did not qualify	did not qualify	—	16,257 (second-highest)

=== Head coaching record ===
As of September 6, 2026

Only competitive matches are counted. Includes NWSL regular season, playoffs, NWSL Challenge Cup, and NWSL x Liga MX Femenil Summer Cup matches.

All-time Angel City FC coaching records
Name	Nationality	From	To	P	W	D	L	GF	GA	Win%
Freya Coombe	England	March 19, 2022	June 15, 2023	36	10	9	17	39	53	27.78
Becki Tweed	England	June 15, 2023	December 9, 2024	47	17	13	17	56	59	36.17
Sam Laity (interim)	England	January 22, 2025	June 1, 2025	10	4	4	2	17	19	40.00
Alexander Straus	Norway	June 1, 2025	June 17, 2026	27	7	15	5	30	36	25.93
Leif Gunnar Smerud (interim)	Norway	June 17, 2026	Present	11	5	4	2	18	10	45.5

=== Team records ===
As of October 1, 2025.

Top goalscorers
Player				Goals scored				
Name	Nat.	Pos.	Angel City career	NWSL	Playoffs	Cup	Other	Total
Alyssa Thompson	(United States) USA	FW	2023–2025	15	0	0	6	21
Claire Emslie	(Scotland) SCO	FW	2022–present	13	0	2	2	17
Savannah McCaskill	(United States) USA	MF	2022–2023	11	0	3	0	14
Sydney Leroux	(United States) USA	FW	2022–present	9	0	1	0	10
Riley Tiernan	(United States) USA	FW	2025–present	8	0	0	0	8

Most appearances
Player				Appearances				
Name	Nat.	Pos.	Angel City career	NWSL	Playoffs	Cup	Other	Total
Madison Hammond	(United States) USA	MF	2022–present	71	1	16	7	95
Megan Reid	(Canada) CAN	DF	2022–present	69	0	12	5	86
Sarah Gorden	(United States) USA	DF	2022–present	67	1	9	6	83
Jasmyne Spencer	(United States) USA	DF	2022–2024	57	1	16	2	76
Claire Emslie	(Scotland) SCO	FW	2022–present	63	1	8	3	75
Alyssa Thompson	(United States) USA	FW	2023–2025	62	1	6	5	74
DiDi Haračić	(Bosnia and Herzegovina) BIH	GK	2022–2024	62	0	9	2	73
M.A. Vignola	(United States) USA	DF	2022–2025	57	1	6	5	69
Clarisse Le Bihan	(France) FRA	MF	2022–2024	47	1	6	1	55
Savannah McCaskill	(United States) USA	MF	2022–2023	42	1	10	2	55

== Award winners ==
Best XI First Team

- Sarah Gorden: 2023

Best XI Second Team

- Savannah McCaskill: 2023
- M.A. Vignola: 2023
