= 2024 Angel City FC season =

Angel City FC
2024 season
- Owners: List of Angel City FC owners
- General manager: Angela Hucles Mangano
- Head coach: Becki Tweed
- Stadium: BMO Stadium (capacity: 22,000)
- League: 12th
- Summer Cup: Semi-finals
- Top goalscorer: League: Claire Emslie; Sydney Leroux (7 each); All: Claire Emslie; Sydney Leroux (8 each)
- Highest home attendance: 22,000 (four times)
- Lowest home attendance: 16,542 v NJ/NY Gotham FC (July 6, 2024, National Women's Soccer League)
- Average home league attendance: 19,313
- Biggest win: 2–0 v Bay FC (Away, July 26, 2024, NWSL x Liga MX Femenil Summer Cup)
- Biggest defeat: 0–3 v Orlando Pride (Home, June 30, 2024, National Women's Soccer League); 0–3 v Portland Thorns FC (Away, November 3, 2024, National Women's Soccer League)
Home colors	Away colors
- All statistics correct as of November 2, 2024.

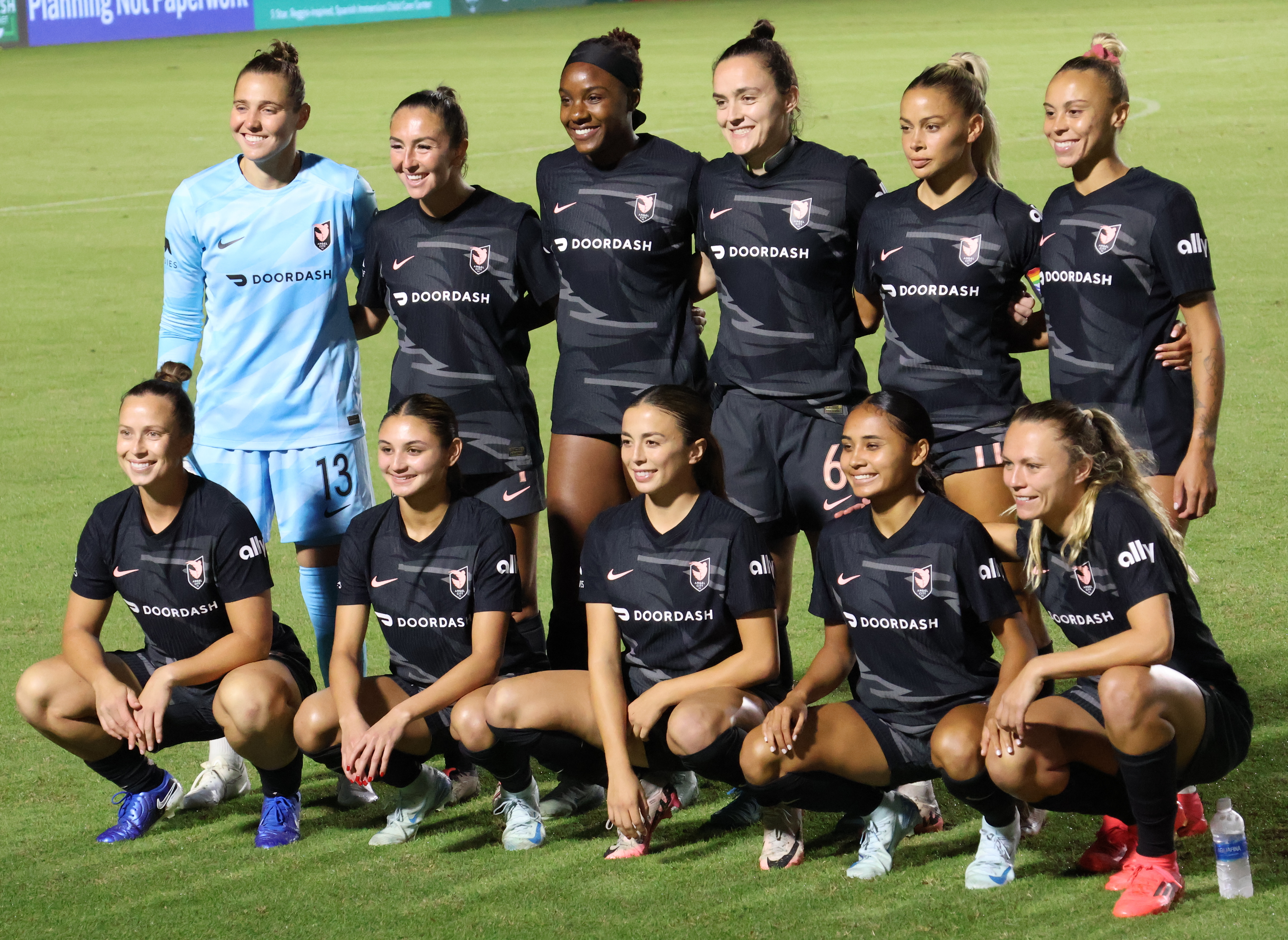
Week 24 starting lineup: Haračić, Zelem, Bright, Reid, Gorden, Vignola Dougherty Howard, Thompson, Curry, Thompson, Emslie

The 2024 Angel City FC season was the team's third season as a professional women's soccer team. Angel City FC plays in the National Women's Soccer League (NWSL), the top tier of women's soccer in the United States.

== Background ==
=== Coaching changes ===
On October 30, 2023, at the conclusion of the 2023 season, Angel City announced that interim coach Becki Tweed would be staying on permanently as head coach. The club announced the departure of Head of Goalkeeping, Daniel Ball on November 8, 2023, after serving his two-year contract.

On January 9, 2024, Angel City announced the hiring of Lee Nguyen as an assistant coach, as well as the promotion of Eleri Earnshaw to first assistant coach. On January 23, 2024, Oliver Blitz was announced as the new Performance Analyst in the preseason roster announcement. On January 31, 2024, Angel City announced the finalized staff for the 2024 season, with Omar Zeenni announced as the new goalkeeper coach and Sarah Neal as the new director of rehabilitation.

On May 14, 2024, Angel City announced the hiring of Mark Wilson as the first Technical Director in club history.

Angel City announce they had parted ways with Assistant Coach Lee Nguyen on August 27, 2024.

On September 18, 2024, Angel City announced the hiring of Matt Wade as the clubs Assistant General Manager, to assist Angela Hucles Mangano in overseeing the club's football operations department and supporting the implementation of the club's sporting strategic plan. Wade previously served as the Head of Sporting Strategy with Feyenoord.

On December 5, 2024, Angel City announced that they had mutually agreed to part ways with General Manager Angela Hucles Mangano who had first joined the club as VP of Player Development in 2021. Assistant General Manager Matt Wade will assume the role of interim General Manager while the club conducts a comprehensive search for a new GM. Following the departure of Hucles, Angel City then announced the departure of Head Coach Becki Tweed on December 9, 2024. Assistant Coach Eleri Earnshaw will act as interim head coach while the search of a new coach begins.

== Summary ==
=== Preseason ===
On January 23, 2024, Angel City announced their preseason roster with the first day of training beginning the following day. On February 14, 2024, Angel City announced that forward Jun Endo had suffered an ACL injury to her left-knee during a preseason training camp in Melbourne, Florida and would be placed on the season-ending injury list. Angel City competed in a friendly against NWSL expansion club Bay FC in the inaugural Coachella Valley Invitational in Indio, California on February 20, 2024, which finished 0–0. After the friendly, Angel City announced a revised 31-player preseason roster on February 26, 2024.

Two new kits for the 2024 season were unveiled on February 27, 2024, the black primary jersey named 'Moonlight', and a pink secondary jersey named 'Sol'.

=== March ===
On March 6, 2024, Angel City announced they had signed USYNT U-17 midfielder Kennedy Fuller on a three-year deal through 2026 with an option for 2027 through the NWSL's U-18 Entry Mechanism. Angel City announced the following week on March 12, that they had signed draft pick Madison Curry to a one-year contract. The following day Angel City announced their final 26-player roster for the 2024 season, with Christen Press and Jun Endo listed with SEI's and Canadian international Vanessa Gilles remaining on loan at Lyon to round out the roster.

Ahead of the start of the 2024 season, it was reported that the four primary owners of the club had voted to have investment firm Moelis & Co. seek an investor and new owner that would assume control of Angel City's board for a reported valuation of $180 million.

Angel City officially kicked off their third NWSL season with a third consecutive sold-out home opener at BMO Stadium against expansion team Bay FC on March 17, 2024. The game saw five players make their debut for Angel City and two of those five, Kennedy Fuller and Gisele Thompson both making their professional debuts in the NWSL. Despite having more shots and possession than their opponents, Angel City ultimately were defeated 1–0 in their first game, failing to comeback after Asisat Oshoala was able to capitalize on a defensive error.

The 2024 NWSL x Liga MX Femenil Summer Cup was announced on March 20, 2024, with Angel City set to take on the two other California-based teams San Diego Wave FC and Bay FC, as well as Liga MX team Club América in three group stage matches taking place over the Olympic break in the summer with a possibility to advance to the knockout stage.

Angel City earned their first point of the season during their first away game at Orlando Pride on March 22. Former Pride player Meggie Dougherty Howard was able to draw a penalty early in the second half which was converted by Claire Emslie but Angel City ultimately lost their lead when Marta was able to score off a corner kick in the eighty-eighth minute and the game finished as a 1–1 draw. Draft pick Madison Curry also made her professional debut with Angel City, coming on as a substitute. Angel City played their second consecutive away game against Kansas City Current for the first time at the newly opened CPKC Stadium and were ultimately defeated 2–4 after goals from Sydney Leroux and Madison Curry were not able to make up the deficit.

=== April ===
At the conclusion of the international break which saw five ACFC players get call ups to their respective national teams, Angel City played a third final consecutive away game against Chicago Red Stars. After making some changes to the starting lineup, Angel City were able to earn their first win of the season and also hand the Red Stars their first defeat of the season in a 1–0 victory off an own goal. The team also recorded their first clean sheet as defenders Megan Reid and Jasmyne Spencer, and veteran goalkeeper DiDi Haračić returned to the starting XI. This game was also Jasmyne Spencer's 175th career NWSL appearance.

On April 20, 2024, Angel City announced they had made two strategic player trades before the closing of the NWSL transfer window. Defender Paige Nielsen would be traded to the Houston Dash in exchange for $50,000 in allocation money and $50,000 in intra-league transfer funds and French international midfielder Amandine Henry would be traded to the Utah Royals in exchange for $75,000 in allocation money.

After three consecutive away games, Angel City returned to BMO Stadium on April 21, 2024, to play the North Carolina Courage in front of a second consecutive sold-out crowd of the season. Claire Emslie scored her first brace in the NWSL for Angel City, the first goal scored off a free kick to help secure a 2–1 victory in Angel City's first home win of the season. Sarah Gorden who captained the match, also made her 100th career NWSL appearance. The win saw Angel City enter 7th place in the overall standings, in playoffs contention for the first time the season.

Later in the week, Angel City concluded the month with hosting Kansas City Current on April 26, 2024. Despite leading at half after a goal from Emslie assisted by Alyssa Thompson, Angel City would go to concede three goals and finish the match as a 1–3 defeat to fall back down to 9th place.

=== May ===
Angel City traveled to face Utah Royals for the first time on May 3, 2024, at America First Field in Sandy, Utah. A goal from Leroux assisted by A. Thompson and a penalty kick converted by Emslie was enough to secure a 2–1 victory in the first match up between the two teams. Angel City returned to home to face Houston Dash on May 12, 2024. The game was held scoreless until former Angel City player Paige Nielsen scored on a set piece in the 99th minute. On May 14, 2024, Angel City announced the hiring of Mark Wilson as the first Technical Director in club history

On May 18, 2024, Angel City faced Washington Spirit away and despite a brief stretch where Angel City was leading 2–1 after forcing an own goal and a goal from Leroux, Angel City conceded three goals and were defeated 2–4. Leroux's goal was her 44th career goal, ranking her 10th all-time. Sisters Gisele and Alyssa Thompson were both named to the starting lineup for the first time, marking the first time in NWSL history that two sisters started for the same team.

On May 23, 2024, Angel City returned home to host Southern California rivals San Diego Wave which ultimately ended as a 0–0 draw. Five Angel City players ended their months on International Duty, including rookie Casey Phair who would play with South Korea in a set of friendlies against the United States.

=== June ===
After the International Break, Angel City traveled to New Jersey to face 2023 NWSL Champions, NJ/NY Gotham FC on June 6, 2024. Despite an equalizer from Clarisse Le Bihan, Angel City were ultimately defeated 1–2. After a winless streak, Angel City announced on June 11, 2024, that forward Christen Press would be returning to training after being sidelined for 730 days due to the ACL injury she sustained in the 2022 season.

Angel City then played Houston Dash away on June 15, 2024, and picked up a point in a scoreless 0–0 draw. On Junetheenth, Angel City hosted Racing Louisville FC. Rookie Kennedy Fuller opened the scoring by scoring her first professional goal assisted by fellow rookie, Madison Curry. Rocky Rodríguez scored her first goal with Angel City to add to Angel City's lead. After conceding two goals, Sydney Leroux scored the game winner in the 85th minute, assisted by Alyssa Thompson to secure a 3–2 win and ending a 5-game winless steak.

Angel City played Bay FC at PayPal Park for the first time and were ultimately defeated in a 0–1 loss. Angel City ended the month with hosting eventual 2024 NWSL Shield and Championship winners Orlando Pride and were defeated in a 0–3 loss due to goals from Adriana and Barbra Banda.

=== July ===
In the final match before the break before the Olympics, Angel City hosted NJ/NY Gotham FC in a match that ended as a 1–2 defeat on July 6, 2024. Angel City went into the Olympic break in 11th place.

At the 2024 ESPY Awards on July 11, 2024, Angel City received the award for Sports Humanitarian Team of the Year, president of the club Julie Uhrman noted, the club in the past year had done 5,400 hours of community service with 1,700 volunteers.

On July 15, 2024, Angel City announced they had mutually agreed to part ways with Clarisse Le Bihan who had been with the team since the inaugural season. Le Bihan finished her time with Angel City with 47 NWSL appearances and 2 goals and would go on to sign with Lazio in Serie A Femminile.

After rumors and unofficial reports, it was formally announced on July 17, 2024, that Willow Bay, Dean of the USC Annenberg School for Communication and Journalism, and Bob Iger, CEO of Walt Disney Company, would be investing $50 million into Angel City to become the majority shareholders. The deal would value the club at $250 million, making it the most value women's sports team in the world. Bay will serve on and have full control of the Angel City Board of Directors, will serve as the Controlling Owner and will represent Angel City on the NWSL's Board of Governors. Angel City's board will continue to include Natalie Portman, Julie Uhrman, Alexis Ohanian and Gillian Berry.

Angel City returned to Fullerton, California to Titan Stadium on July 20, 2024, for the inaugural NWSL x Liga MX Femenil Summer Cup and hosted Liga MX Femenil team Club América and secured three-points with goals from Fuller and Leroux in a 2–1 victory. Angel City played their second match of the Summer Cup traveling to San Jose, California to face Bay FC on July 26, 2024, and secured another three-points in a 2–0 victory. 17-year old rookie Casey Phair made her professional debut in the match subbing on for Messiah Bright in the 66th minute.

=== August ===
Angel City began the month with their final Summer Cup match against San Diego Wave FC on August 1, 2024. Christen Press returned to the pitch to play her first game in 782 days when she subbed in the 89th minute of the game. The game finished as a 0–0 draw and due to the Summer Cup rules went to a penalty shootout. Press, A. Thompson, Fuller, Rodríguez, and Emslie all converted their penalty kicks and DiDi Haračić managed to save a kick from Amirah Ali to win the shootout 5–4, secure two points, finish atop the group, and send the team to the semifinals. For the semifinals of the NWSL x Liga MX Femenil Summer Cup, Angel City travels to Kansas City to play NJ/NY Gotham FC on August 6, 2024, and Angel City were not able to rally after Gotham scored in the 58th minute.

On August 9, 2024, the NWSL released the July 2024 Best XI and featured Sarah Gorden and Madison Curry. Gorden earned a spot on the Best XI after recording four tackles won throughout the month and registering a passing accuracy of 79.34% in 360 minutes played. Gorden helped lead Angel City FC to the top of Group D and a spot in the NWSL x LIGA MX Femenil Semifinals in Kansas City, Missouri. Curry recorded five tackles won along with eight interceptions during July to earn a spot in the Best XI. The California native played a total of 256 minutes in July helping Angel City to an undefeated run in the NWSL x LIGA MX Femenil Summer Cup group stage.

On August 12, 2024, it was officially announced that England midfielder Katie Zelem would sign with Angel City through 2026 via free agency.

On August 18, 2024, Angel City hosted Liga MX Femenil team FC Juárez in a friendly which finished as a 7–0 victory, the largest victory in club history. Messiah Bright scored a hat-trick, the first hat-trick in Angel City's history. The game also saw a brace for Claire Emslie as well as defender Megan Reid's first goal, as well as Alyssa Thompson's first goal of the season, converted via penalty-kick. The game also saw a debut for goalkeeper Hannah Stambaugh.

After having to withdraw from the New Zealand squad for the 2024 Summer Olympics due to injury, captain Ali Riley was officially added to the Season-Ending Injury (SEI) list on August 22, 2024, due to a chronic and persistent leg injury that has kept her out for the majority of the season. Vice-captain, defender Sarah Gorden who assumed the role of captain in Riley's absence, would regularly captain Angel City matches for the rest of the season.

After a scoring drought, Alyssa Thompson scored her first professional brace in Angel City's first regular-season match after the Olympic break against San Diego Wave FC on August 24, 2024. Thompson became the second teenager after Mallory Swanson to score a brace in a NWSL match. Katie Zelem also made her debut with Angel City coming on a substitute.

Angel City announce they had parted ways with Assistant Coach Lee Nguyen on August 27, 2024.

=== September ===
Angel City kicked off the month hosting Chicago Red Stars on September 1, 2024, A. Thompson continued her scoring streak and along with another goal from Leroux, Angel City won the match 2–1.

On September 5, 2024, Angel City announced they would be signing a new contract with Japanese forward Jun Endo keeping her in Los Angeles until 2027, while she continues to recover from the ACL injury she sustained during preseason. On September 6, 2024, three Angel City players were named to the August 2024 NWSL Best XI for their performances in the Summer Cup and matches since the conclusion of the Olympic break. Sarah Gorden was named for the second consecutive month, and Alyssa Thompson and DiDi Haračić were named to the Best XI for the first time.

Angel City played a second consecutive match at home but were defeated by the visiting Seattle Reign on September 6, 2024, in a 2–3 defeat despite goals again from A. Thompson and Leroux. Angel City then traveled to play Racing Louisville FC on September 14, 2024, and Meggie Dougherty Howard scored her first Angel City goal to open the scoring but Angel City were ultimately defeated 1–2.

On September 18, 2024, Angel City announced the hiring of Matt Wade as the clubs Assistant General Manager, to assist Angela Hucles Mangano in overseeing the club's football operations department and supporting the implementation of the club's sporting strategic plan.

Angel City returned to BMO Stadium to play Portland Thorns FC on September 23, 2024, and Alyssa Thompson scored her fifth goal of the season and Emslie her seventh to secure a 2–2 draw. Angel City played the fifth and final match of the month on September 27, 2024, hosting Washington Spirit. Forward Messiah Bright scored her first regular-season goal of the season but it was ultimately not enough as Angel City were defeated 1–2.

=== October ===
It was reported on October 3, 2024, that Angel City would be fined $200,000, and docked 3 points in the 2024 standings for violating the NWSL salary cap. Team president and CEO Julie Uhrman and general manager Angela Hucles Mangano also have been suspended "from conducting duties related to any player transactions" for the rest of 2024. This saw the team drop down to 12th place in the standings. According to the league's investigation, the team had exceeded the salary cap by $50,000 for four weeks during the 2024 season. While Angel City accepted full responsibility for their violations, they defended their actions as they had believed "childcare payments do not count against the salary cap". Sydney Leroux, one of the mothers on the team, also spoke out against the league's decision.

Fresh off the news of the clubs salary cap violations, Angel City traveled to play Seattle Reign FC on October 4, 2024. M.A. Vignola, who had been battling injury through the season, scored her first goal of the season, assisted by Alyssa Thompson, and it ended as the match winner in a 1–0 victory. Earlier that day Alyssa Thomson was once again named to the NWSL Team of the Month for September for back-to-back months for scoring 3 goals and 1 assist that month.

Angel City then traveled to play North Carolina Courage on October 12, 2024. Christen Press scored her first goal since returning from her injury in stoppage time to almost secure the win, but the Courage managed to equalize and end the match as a 1–1 draw. The match also marked Press' 100th NWSL appearance. As this was must win game to keep them in playoff contention, Angel City's playoff eligibility was now out of their control.

On October 15, 2024, veteran defender Merritt Mathias announced that she would be retiring at the conclusion of the 2024 season. Mathias dealt with injury throughout her time at Angel City and was honored at the final home match of the season on October 20, 2024, against Utah Royals. After a goal from Claudia Zornoza, Sydney Leroux scored an equalizer off a header assist from Gisele Thompson, her first professional assist. The match finished as a 1–1 draw. Before the match began, Angel City was officially eliminated from playoff contention.

On October 29, 2024, Angel City announced Sydney Leroux would re-sign with Angel City which would keep her with the club until 2027. Leroux described this as her "last go" and that she would end her career with Angel City. Three players were called up by their respective national teams during the International Break. Alyssa Thompson earned her first official call-up of the year and also scored her first senior goal for the United States in a friendly against Iceland. Owner Natalie Portman also represented Angel City at the 2024 Ballon d'Or ceremony in Paris.

=== November ===
In the final match of the 2024 regular season, Angel City traveled to play Portland Thorns FC and were defeated 0–3 as the Thorns played to clinch their playoff berth. Angel City ultimately finished 12th of out 14 teams with 24 points after their deduction, 29 goals scored and 42 goals scored against. Angel City did remain second in overall attendance.

=== Postseason ===
On November 18, 2024, Angel City announced they would be moving into a newly renovated performance facility at California Lutheran University. The performance center, formerly used by the Los Angeles Rams of the NFL, offers a full-size pitch and a half and approximately 50,000 square feet of indoor space, the largest dedicated solely to NWSL club. The performance center will serve as the home of Angel City players and first-team staff for up to four years and would be completed ahead of the 2025 preseason. The center features a 5,400-square-foot gym, custom lockers for players, coaches, staff, and a dedicated locker room for players under 18, a new hydrotherapy area including cold and hot plunge pools and saunas, a private outdoor relaxation lounge, a 3,400-square-foot medical treatment and rehabilitation area, a private recovery room, private doctor's office and medical staff offices, Custom pre- and post-training nutrition and supplement area to provide elevated nutrition area for athletes to fuel with fresh, nutritious meals prepared onsite, children's playroom to support the families of our players and staff, a 930-square-foot team meeting and film room, coaching and performance offices for soccer operations staff, and a fit-for-purpose studio onsite for content capture and interviews.

On November 19, 2024, announced NYX Professional Makeup as a new multi-year sleeve sponsor for the 2025 season, NYX is the first makeup brand to invest in a soccer team.

On November 22, 2024, Angel City announced they had signed Scottish forward Claire Emslie to a new contract to keep her with Angel City until 2026.

On December 4, 2024, rookie defender Madison Curry announced she would not be re-signing with Angel City and would instead sign with Seattle Reign as a free agent. Later that day, Angel City announced the contract extension of Japanese goalkeeper Hannah Stambaugh for the 2025 season.

On December 5, 2024, Angel City announced that they had mutually agreed to part ways with General Manager Angela Hucles Mangano who had first joined the club as VP of Player Development in 2021. Assistant General Manager Matt Wade will assume the role of interim General Manager while the club conducts a comprehensive search for a new GM. Following the departure of Hucles, Angel City then announced the departure of Head Coach Becki Tweed on December 9, 2024. Tweed finished her time at Angel City with 17 wins, 13 draws, 17 loss across all competitions with a win rate of 36.17%. Assistant Coach Eleri Earnshaw will act as interim head coach while the search of a new coach begins.

At the conclusion of the 2024 season, on December 10, 2024, Angel City announced their end-of-season roster, they announced they will not be renewing the contract of goalkeeper DiDi Haračić and defender Jasmyne Spencer, who have been with the club since its inaugural season in 2022, as well as midfielder Meggie Dougherty Howard and forward Katie Johnson, who would later announce her retirement from professional soccer on December 20, 2024.

== Stadium and facilities ==
Angel City FC continued to play in BMO Stadium, their home since the team's inaugural season in 2022.

While Angel City's owners have spoken about plans to build a designated training facility for the team, Angel City continues to trains at California Lutheran University in Thousand Oaks, California. They currently use portable buildings on the college campus for offices and locker rooms and a tent for a weight room.

After the conclusion of the season, on November 18, 2024, Angel City announced they would be moving into a newly renovated performance facility at California Lutheran University. The performance center, formerly used by the Los Angeles Rams of the NFL, offers a full-size pitch and a half and approximately 50,000 square feet of indoor space, the largest dedicated solely to NWSL club. The performance center will serve as the home of Angel City players and first-team staff for up to four years and would be completed ahead of the 2025 preseason.

== Team ==
=== Current staff ===
As of August 27, 2024.

Executive
President	Julie Uhrman
General manager	Angela Hucles Mangano
Coaching
Head Coach	Becki Tweed
First Assistant Coach	Eleri Earnshaw
Goalkeeper Coach	Omar Zeenni
Technical Assistant Coach	Mykell Bates
Performance Analyst	Oliver Blitz
Technical Staff
Senior Director of Soccer Operations	Marisa Leconte
Director of Player Care	Alex Bitaine
Soccer Operations Coordinator	Alrick Drummond
Player Care Coordinator	Olivia Aluko
Head Equipment Manager	Brock Chartier
Director of Medical and Performance	Sarah Smith
Head of Sports Science	Dan Jones
Physical Performance Coach	Michael Roman
Head Athletic Trainer	Manny De Alba
Director of Rehabilitation	Sarah Neal
Assistant Athletic Trainer	April Seymon
Physical Therapist	Symiah Campbell

=== Squad ===
As of August 12, 2024.

No.	Nat.	Name	Date of birth (age)	Since	Previous team	Notes
Goalkeepers
1	(Japan)	Hannah Stambaugh	December 24, 1998 (aged 25)	2024	(Japan) Omiya Ardija Ventus	
13	(Bosnia and Herzegovina)	DiDi Haračić	April 12, 1992 (aged 31)	2021	(United States) NJ/NY Gotham FC	
19	(United States)	Angelina Anderson	March 22, 2001 (aged 23)	2023	(United States) University of California-Berkeley	
Defenders
3	(United States)	Jasmyne Spencer	August 27, 1990 (aged 33)	2021	(United States) Houston Dash	
4	(Canada)	Vanessa Gilles	March 11, 1996 (aged 28)	2021	(France) Bordeaux	LOAN (Note: Loaned out to another team)
5	(New Zealand)	Ali Riley (Captain)	October 30, 1987 (aged 36)	2022	(United States) Orlando Pride	SEI (Note: Season-ending injury)
6	(United States)	Megan Reid	July 9, 1996 (aged 27)	2022	(United States) Lamorinda United	
11	(United States)	Sarah Gorden (Vice Captain)	September 13, 1992 (aged 31)	2021	(United States) Chicago Red Stars	
12	(United States)	Merritt Mathias	July 2, 1990 (aged 33)	2023	(United States) North Carolina Courage	
16	(United States)	M.A. Vignola	February 11, 1998 (aged 26)	2021	(Iceland) Valur (via Washington Spirit)	
20	(United States)	Gisele Thompson	December 5, 2005 (aged 18)	2024	(United States) Total Futbol Academy	
27	(United States)	Madison Curry	January 23, 2001 (aged 23)	2024	(United States) Princeton	
44	(United States)	Elizabeth Eddy	September 13, 1991 (aged 32)	2023	(United States) Houston Dash	
Midfielders
4	(England)	Katie Zelem	January 20, 1996 (aged 28)	2024	(England) Manchester United	
7	(Costa Rica)	Rocky Rodríguez	October 28, 1993 (aged 30)	2024	(United States) Portland Thorns	
8	(United States)	Meggie Dougherty Howard	July 27, 1995 (aged 28)	2024	(United States) San Diego Wave FC	
17	(United States)	Kennedy Fuller	March 9, 2007 (aged 17)	2024	(United States) Solar SC	
28	(United States)	Lily Nabet	September 24, 1999 (aged 24)	2022	(United States) Duke University	
99	(United States)	Madison Hammond	November 15, 1997 (aged 26)	2022	(United States) OL Reign	
Forwards
2	(United States)	Sydney Leroux	May 7, 1990 (aged 33)	2022	(United States) Orlando Pride	
9	(South Korea)	Casey Phair	June 29, 2007 (aged 16)	2024	(United States) Players Development Academy	
10	(Scotland)	Claire Emslie	March 8, 1994 (aged 30)	2022	(United States) Orlando Pride	
18	(Japan)	Jun Endo	May 24, 2000 (aged 23)	2021	(Japan) Tokyo Verdy Beleza	SEI
21	(United States)	Alyssa Thompson	November 7, 2004 (aged 19)	2023	(United States) Total Futbol Academy	
23	(United States)	Christen Press	December 29, 1988 (aged 35)	2021	(England) Manchester United (via Racing Louisville FC)	
24	(United States)	Messiah Bright	January 12, 2000 (aged 24)	2024	(United States) Orlando Pride	
33	(Mexico)	Katie Johnson	September 14, 1994 (aged 29)	2023	(United States) San Diego Wave FC	

== Transactions ==
=== 2024 NWSL Draft ===
Draft picks are not automatically signed to the team roster. The 2024 NWSL Draft was held on January 15, 2024, in Anaheim, California.

R	P	Nat.	Player	Pos.	College/school	Status	Ref.
3	37	(United States)	Felicia Knox	MF	Alabama	Not signed.	
4	44	(United States)	Jessica Garziano	MF	St. John's	Not signed.	
4	51	(United States)	Madison Curry	DF	Princeton	Signed to a one-year contract.	

=== Contract options ===
Date	Nat.	Player	Pos.	Notes	Ref.
November 20, 2023	(United States)	Kelsey Hill	MF	Contract expired.	
November 20, 2023	(United States)	Mackenzie Pluck	MF	Contract expired.	
December 20, 2023	(United States)	Savannah McCaskill	MF	Contract expired and signed with San Diego Wave FC.	
January 3, 2024	(United States)	Brittany Isenhour	GK	Contract expired and later announced retirement.	
January 16, 2024	(United States)	Dani Weatherholt	MF	Contract expired and signed with North Carolina Courage.	
January 22, 2024	(United States)	Simone Charley	FW	Contract expired and signed with Orlando Pride.	

=== Re-signings ===
Date	Nat.	Player	Pos.	Notes	Ref.
October 30, 2023	(United States)	Angelina Anderson	GK	Re-signed on a new contract through 2025.	
December 19, 2023	(United States)	Sarah Gorden	DF	Re-signed on a new contract through 2026 with an option for 2027.	
January 4, 2024	(United States)	Elizabeth Eddy	MF	Re-signed on a new contract through 2025.	
January 5, 2024	(United States)	Megan Reid	DF	Re-signed on a new contract through 2025.	
January 8, 2024	(United States)	Lily Nabet	MF	Re-signed on a new contract through 2025.	
January 11, 2024	(United States)	Madison Hammond	MF	Re-signed on a new contract through 2025.	
January 17, 2024	(France)	Clarisse Le Bihan	MF	Re-signed on a new contract through 2024 with a mutual option for 2025.	
September 5, 2024	(Japan)	Jun Endo	FW	Re-signed on a new contract beginning in 2025 through 2027.	

=== Preseason trialists ===
Date	Nat.	Player	Pos.	Previous club	Fee/notes	Ref.
January 23, 2024	(United States)	Allie Augur	GK	(United States) Georgetown University	Not signed.	
January 23, 2024	(United States)	Sasha Pickard	DF	(United States) Alabama	Not signed.	
January 23, 2024	(United States)	Sam Kroeger	MF	(United States) Rutgers	Not signed.	
January 23, 2024	(United States)	Maggie Lena	MF	(Israel) F.C. Kiryat Gat	Not signed.	
January 23, 2024	(United States)	Claire Winter	MF	(United States) UCLA	Not signed.	
February 26, 2024	(United States)	Kennedy Fuller	FW	(United States) Solar SC	U18 trialist; signed to a thee-year contract.	
February 26, 2024	(United States)	Leena Powell	FW	(United States) Club Tudela FC	U18 trialist.	

=== Loans out ===
Date	Nat.	Player	Pos.	Destination club	Fee/notes	Ref.
September 19, 2022	(Canada)	Vanessa Gilles	DF	(France) Olympique Lyon	Expected to return in June 2025.	

=== Transfers in ===
Date	Nat.	Player	Pos.	Previous club	Fee/notes	Ref.
December 6, 2023	(United States)	Gisele Thompson	DF	(United States) Total Futbol Academy	Signed contract through 2025 season with mutual option for 2026 via NWSL U-18 Entry Mechanism.	
January 12, 2024	(United States)	Meggie Dougherty Howard	MF	(United States) San Diego Wave FC	Acquired from San Diego Wave FC in exchange for $40,000 in allocation money.	
January 18, 2024	(South Korea)	Casey Phair	FW	(United States) Player's Development Academy	Signed three-year contract via NWSL U-18 Entry Mechanism.	
January 23, 2024	(Costa Rica)	Rocky Rodríguez	MF	(United States) Portland Thorns FC	Acquired from Portland Thorns FC in exchange for $275,000 in allocation money, with additional conditional funds to be paid against the transfer fee threshold.	
January 24, 2024	(Japan)	Hannah Stambaugh	GK	(Japan) Omiya Ardija Ventus	Acquired from Omiya Ardija Ventus for a $10,000 transfer fee.	
January 26, 2024	(United States)	Messiah Bright	FW	(United States) Orlando Pride	Acquired from Orlando Pride in exchange for $130,000 intra-league transfer funds.	
March 6, 2024	(United States)	Kennedy Fuller	MF	(United States) Solar SC	Signed contract via NWSL U-18 Entry Mechanism through 2026 season with option for 2027.	
August 12, 2024	(England)	Katie Zelem	MF	(England) Manchester United	Signed contract via free agency through 2026 season.	

=== Transfers out ===
Date	Nat.	Player	Pos.	Destination club	Fee/notes	Ref.
December 12, 2023	(Mexico)	Scarlett Camberos	FW	(United States) Bay FC	Traded in exchange for $50,000 in allocation money and protection in 2024 expansion draft.	
April 20, 2024	(France)	Amandine Henry	MF	(United States) Utah Royals	Traded in exchange for $75,000 in allocation money.	
April 20, 2024	(United States)	Paige Nielsen	DF	(United States) Houston Dash	Traded in exchange for $50,000 in allocation money and $50,000 in intra-league transfer funds.	
July 15, 2024	(France)	Clarisse Le Bihan	MF	(Italy) SS Lazio	Mutually agreed to part ways.	

=== Retirements ===
Date	Nat.	Player	Pos.	Ref.
October 15, 2024	(United States)	Merritt Mathias	DF	

=== Injury listings ===
Date	Nat.	Player	Pos.	List	Injury/Notes	Ref.
	(United States)	Christen Press	FW	Season-ending injury	Continuing recovery from a right knee anterior cruciate ligament tear from 2022 season. Removed from SEI list on August 4, 2024, after 781 days.	
February 14, 2024	(Japan)	Jun Endo	FW	Season-ending injury	Left knee anterior cruciate ligament tear.	
August 22, 2024	(New Zealand)	Ali Riley	DF	Season-ending injury	Due to a chronic and persistent leg injury.	

== Competitions ==
=== Preseason ===
February 24, 2024 Coachella Valley Invitational	Angel City FC	0–0	Bay FC	Indio, California
1:00 p.m. PDT (UTC-7)		Report		Stadium: Empire Polo Club

=== NWSL x Liga MX Femenil Summer Cup ===
Pos	Team	Pld	W	PW	PL	L	GF	GA	GD	Pts	Qualification	LA	SD	AME	BAY
1	(United States Soccer Federation) Angel City FC	3	2	1	0	0	4	1	+3	8	Advances to knockout stage	—	0–0	2–1	2–0
2	(United States Soccer Federation) San Diego Wave FC	3	1	0	1	1	3	3	0	4		0–0	—	0–2	3–1
3	(Mexican Football Federation) Club América	3	1	0	0	2	4	4	0	3		1–2	2–0	—	1–2
4	(United States Soccer Federation) Bay FC	3	1	0	0	2	3	6	−3	3		0–2	1–3	2–1	—

Source: NWSL
Rules for classification: tiebreakers

July 20, 2024 1	Angel City FC (United States)	2–1	(Mexico) Club América	Fullerton, California
7:00 p.m. PDT (UTC-7)	Fuller 29'; Leroux 89'	Report	Palacios 90+3'	Stadium: Titan Stadium; Referee: Laura Rodriguez

July 26, 2024 2	Bay FC (United States)	0–2	(United States) Angel City FC	San Jose, California
5:00 p.m. PDT (UTC-7)		Report	Bailey 18' (o.g.); Emslie 54'	Stadium: PayPal Park; Attendance: 9,766; Referee: Adam Zarrin

August 1, 2024 3	Angel City FC (United States)	0–0 (5–3 p)	(United States) San Diego Wave FC	Fullerton, California
7:00 p.m. PDT (UTC-7)		Report		Stadium: Titan Stadium

August 6, 2024 SF	NJ/NY Gotham FC (United States)	1–0	(United States) Angel City FC	Kansas City Missouri
	Sheehan 48'	Report		Stadium: CPKC Stadium; Referee: Elijio Arreguin

=== Regular season ===
All matches are in Pacific time

==== Matches ====
March 17, 2024 1	Angel City FC	0–1	Bay FC	Los Angeles, California
4:30 p.m. PDT (UTC-7)		Report	Loera (yellow card) 31'; Oshoala 17' (Boade)	Stadium: BMO Stadium; Attendance: 22,000; Referee: Alyssa Nichols

March 22, 2024 2	Orlando Pride	1–1	Angel City FC	Orlando, Florida
5:00 p.m. PDT (UTC-7)	Gautrat (yellow card) 10'; Marta (yellow card) 71'; Marta 88' (Angelina)	Report	Emslie 53' (pen.); Henry (yellow card) 90+6'	Stadium: Inter&Co Stadium; Attendance: 6,306; Referee: Alex Billeter

March 30, 2024 3	Kansas City Current	4–2	Angel City FC	Kansas City, Missouri
12:30 p.m. PDT (UTC-7)	DiBernardo 6' (Chawinga); Wheeler (yellow card) 40'; Spaanstra 45+3' (DiBernardo); Chawinga 51' (Bia); Bia 90+2'	Report	Leroux 50' (Emslie); Nielsen (yellow card) 75'; Curry 78' (Riley); Emslie (yellow card) 90+6'	Stadium: CPKC Stadium; Attendance: 11,500; Referee: Danielle Chesky

April 13, 2024 4	Chicago Red Stars	0–1	Angel City FC	Bridgeview, Illinois
6:30 p.m. PDT (UTC-7)	Bike (yellow card) 39'	Report	Spencer (yellow card) 35'; Rall 40' (o.g.); Reid (yellow card) 45+1'; Johnson (yellow card) 90+3'	Stadium: SeatGeek Stadium; Attendance: 3,168; Referee: Adam Kilpatrick

April 21, 2024 5	Angel City FC	2–1	North Carolina Courage	Los Angeles, CA
4:30 p.m. PDT (UTC-7)	Emslie 23', 54' (A. Thompson); Curry (yellow card) 59'	Report	Kurtz (yellow card) 22'; Lussi 73'	Stadium: BMO Stadium; Attendance: 22,000; Referee: Alexis Da Silva

April 26, 2024 6	Angel City FC	1–3	Kansas City Current	Los Angeles, CA
7:00 p.m. PDT (UTC-7)	Emslie 34' (A. Thompson); Hammond (yellow card) 55'; Reid (yellow card) 77'	Report	Hutton (yellow card) 28'; DiBernardo 54' (Bia); Cooper (yellow card) 85'; Lavogez 90' (Rodriguez), 90+3'; Robinson (yellow card) 90+7'	Stadium: BMO Stadium; Attendance: 19,178; Referee: Ekaterina Koroleva

May 3, 2024 7	Utah Royals	1–2	Angel City FC	Sandy, Utah
6:30 p.m. PDT (UTC-7)	Griffitts (yellow card) 38'; Foederer 51' (Sentnor); Flynn (yellow card) 90+1'	Report	Leroux 29' (A. Thompson); Emslie 40' (pen.); Rodríguez (yellow card) 44'; A. Thompson (yellow card) 87'; Fuller (yellow card) 87'; Nabet (yellow card) 90+3'	Stadium: America First Field; Attendance: 10,731; Referee: Ricardo Fierro

May 12, 2024 8	Angel City FC	0–1	Houston Dash	Los Angeles, CA
4:30 p.m. PDT (UTC-7)	Le Bihan (yellow card) 38'; Rodríguez (yellow card) 68'	Report	Puntigam (yellow card) 6'; Schmidt (yellow card) 17'; Nielsen 90+8' (Andressa)	Stadium: BMO Stadium; Attendance: 18,037; Referee: Thomas Snyder

May 18, 2024 9	Washington Spirit	4–2	Angel City FC	Washington, District of Columbia
4:30 p.m. PDT (UTC-7)	Rodman 9' (Sarr), 30' (Bethune); Krueger 34' (McKeown); Sarr 36' (Bethune)	Report	Butel 20' (o.g.); Leroux 23' (Emslie); Nabet (yellow card) 43'; Curry (yellow card) 45+2'; Spencer (yellow card) 61'; G. Thompson (yellow card) 65'; Emslie (yellow card) 90+4'	Stadium: Audi Field; Attendance: 13,342; Referee: Anya Voigt

May 23, 2024 10	Angel City FC	0–0	San Diego Wave FC	Los Angeles, CA
7:00 p.m. PDT (UTC-7)	Hammond (yellow card) 69'; Nabet (yellow card) 98'	Report	Bennett (yellow card) 2'	Stadium: BMO Stadium; Attendance: 19,103; Referee: Elton Garcia

June 8, 2024 11	NJ/NY Gotham FC	2–1	Angel City FC	Harrison, New Jersey
9:30 a.m. PDT (UTC-7)	Freeman (yellow card) 24'; Dunn 26' (Ryan); Lavelle 62' (Sonnett)	Report	Curry (yellow card) 41'; Le Bihan 51' (A. Thompson)	Stadium: Red Bull Arena; Attendance: 11,662; Referee: Rebecca Pagan

June 15, 2024 12	Houston Dash	0–0	Angel City FC	Houston, Texas
6:30 p.m. PDT (UTC-7)	Olivieri (yellow card) 52'; Nielsen (yellow card) 85'	Report	Nabet (yellow card) 6'	Stadium: Shell Energy Stadium; Attendance: 6,147; Referee: Eric Tattersall

June 19, 2024 13	Angel City FC	3–2	Racing Louisville FC	Los Angeles, CA
7:00 p.m. PDT (UTC-7)	Rodríguez (yellow card) 12' (goal) 32'; Fuller 17' (Curry); Reid (yellow card) 39'; Mathias (yellow card) 45+8'; Hammond (yellow card) 63'; Leroux 85' (A. Thompson)	Report	Flint 41' (pen.); Fischer (yellow card) 45+2'; Pickett 64' (Sears); Howell (yellow card) 74'	Stadium: BMO Stadium; Attendance: 16,735; Referee: Lorenzo Hernandez

June 22, 2024 14	Bay FC	1–0	Angel City FC	San Jose, California
7:00 p.m. PDT (UTC-7)	Boade 33' (Menges); King (yellow card) 34'; Beattie (yellow card) 49'; Kundananji (yellow card) 85'	Report	Le Bihan (yellow card) 36'; Dougherty Howard (yellow card) 89'	Stadium: PayPal Park; Attendance: 15,640; Referee: Thomas Snyder

June 30, 2024 15	Angel City FC	0–3	Orlando Pride	Los Angeles, CA
4:30 p.m. PDT (UTC-7)	Haračić (yellow card) 66'; Hammond (yellow card) 77'; Dougherty Howard (yellow card) 83'	Report	Adriana 20' (Marta), 26'; Sams (yellow card) 75'; Banda 90+6'	Stadium: BMO Stadium; Attendance: 22,000; Referee: Elijio Arreguin

July 6, 2024 16	Angel City FC	1–2	NJ/NY Gotham FC	Los Angeles, CA
7:00 p.m. PDT (UTC-7)	Emslie 69' (pen.)	Report	Martin (yellow card) 13'; Lavelle 16' (Dunn); Sheehan 40' (Stevens); Freeman (yellow card) 67'; Stengel (yellow card) 90+7'	Stadium: BMO Stadium; Attendance: 16,542; Referee: Katja Koroleva

August 24, 2024 17	San Diego Wave FC	1–2	Angel City FC	San Diego, California
1:00 p.m. PDT (UTC-7)	Dahlkemper 90+7' (Sánchez)	Report	A. Thompson 20', 29' (Dougherty Howard); Spencer (yellow card) 90+6'	Stadium: Snapdragon Stadium; Referee: Eric Tattersall

September 1, 2024 18	Angel City FC	2–1	Chicago Red Stars	Los Angeles, CA
1:00 p.m. PDT (UTC-7)	A. Thompson 6'; Zelem (yellow card) 72'; Leroux 90+1' (Vignola)	Report	Franklin 45+10' (Kuikka)	Stadium: BMO Stadium; Attendance: 18,159; Referee: John Griggs

September 6, 2024 19	Angel City FC	2–3	Seattle Reign	Los Angeles, CA
7:00 p.m. PDT (UTC-7)	A. Thompson 8' (Leroux); Haračić (yellow card) 30'; Leroux 90+9' (Vignola)	Report	Lester (yellow card) 12'; Huerta 31' (pen.); Ji 45+6'; King 58' (Crnogorčević)	Stadium: BMO Stadium; Attendance: 16,023; Referee: Trevor Wiseman

September 14, 2024 20	Racing Louisville FC	2–1	Angel City FC	Louisville, Kentucky
4:30 p.m. PDT (UTC-7)	Balcer 26' (Ary Borges); Fischer (yellow card) 66'; Beckie 68'; Ary Borges (yellow card) 74'; Sears (yellow card) 90+4'	Report	Dougherty Howard 18'; Spencer (yellow card) 72'; Bright (yellow card) 90+4'	Stadium: Lynn Family Stadium; Attendance: 5,493; Referee: Danielle Chesky

September 23, 2024 21	Angel City FC	2–2	Portland Thorns FC	Los Angeles, CA
7:00 p.m. PDT (UTC-7)	A. Thompson 10' (Dougherty Howard); Emslie 76'	Report	Weaver 49' (Müller); Fleming (yellow card) 59'; Moultrie 64' (Hubly)	Stadium: BMO Stadium; Attendance: 22,000; Referee: Joshua Encarnación

September 27, 2024 22	Angel City FC	1–2	Washington Spirit	Los Angeles, CA
7:00 p.m. PDT (UTC-7)	Bright 51' (A. Thompson)	Report	Morgan (yellow card) 14'; Santos (yellow card) 28'; Metayer (yellow card) 35'; Hatch 39'; McKeown (yellow card) 69'; Morris 78' (Kouassi); Hershfelt (yellow card) 90+6'	Stadium: BMO Stadium; Attendance: 19,257; Referee: Alyssa Nichols

October 4, 2024 23	Seattle Reign	0–1	Angel City FC	Seattle, Washington
7:00 p.m. PDT (UTC-7)	Howell (yellow card) 88'	Report	Vignola 34' (A. Thompson); Emslie (yellow card) 85'; Hammond (yellow card) 90+5'	Stadium: Lumen Field; Referee: Matthew Thompson

October 12, 2024 24	North Carolina Courage	1–1	Angel City FC	Cary, North Carolina
4:30 p.m. PDT (UTC-7)	Wingate 90+10' (O'Sullivan)	Report	Curry (yellow card) 33'; Leroux (yellow card) 90+2'; Press 90+7' (Zelem)	Stadium: WakeMed Soccer Park; Attendance: 7,037; Referee: Eric Tattersall

October 20, 2024 25	Angel City FC	1–1	Utah Royals	Los Angeles, CA
4:30 p.m. PDT (UTC-7)	Curry (yellow card) 20'; A. Thompson (yellow card) 22'; Zelem (yellow card) 40'; Leroux 57' (G. Thompson)	Report	Zornoza 21'	Stadium: BMO Stadium; Attendance: 20,039; Referee: Sergii Demianchuk

November 1, 2024 26	Portland Thorns FC	3–0	Angel City FC	Portland, Oregon
7:00 p.m. PDT (UTC-7)	Sinclair 16'; Smith 26' (Coffey); Weaver 45+4' (Sugita)	Report	Bright (yellow card) 73'	Stadium: Providence Park; Attendance: 23,212; Referee: Brad Jensen

==== Regular season standings ====
Pos	Team	Pld	W	D	L	GF	GA	GD	Pts
10	San Diego Wave FC	26	6	7	13	24	35	−11	25
11	Utah Royals	26	7	4	15	22	40	−18	25
12	Angel City FC	26	7	6	13	29	42	−13	24 (Note: Angel City FC were deducted three points for breaching spending cap rules.)
13	Seattle Reign FC	26	6	5	15	27	44	−17	23
14	Houston Dash	26	5	5	16	20	42	−22	20

Source: NWSL
Rules for classification: Tiebreakers

==== Results summary ====
Overall								Home						Away					
Pld	W	D	L	GF	GA	GD	Pts	W	D	L	GF	GA	GD	W	D	L	GF	GA	GD
26	7	6	13	29	42	−13	27	3	3	7	15	22	−7	4	3	6	14	20	−6

Last updated: November 2, 2024.
Source: NWSLsoccer.com

==== Results by matchday ====
Matchday	1	2	3	4	5	6	7	8	9	10	11	12	13	14	15	16	17	18	19	20	21	22	23	24	25	26
Stadium	H	A	A	A	H	H	A	H	A	H	A	A	H	A	H	H	A	H	H	A	H	H	A	A	H	A
Result	L	D	L	W	W	L	W	L	L	D	L	D	W	L	L	L	W	W	L	L	D	L	W	D	D	L
Position	11	11	14	10	7	9	7	9	9	11	12	11	9	10	11	11	9	9	9	10	10	11	11	11	11	12

Updated to match(es) played on November 2, 2024. Source: NWSL
A = Away; H = Home; W = Win; D = Draw; L = Loss

=== International club friendlies ===
On July 12, 2024, Angel City announced they would be hosting Liga MX Femenil team FC Juárez in a friendly on August 18, 2024, at BMO Stadium.

August 18, 2024 Friendly	Angel City FC	7–0	(Mexico) FC Juárez	Los Angeles, California
7:00 p.m. PDT (UTC-7)	Bright 1' (Fuller); Reid 3' (Curry); Bright 8'; Thompson 18' (pen.); Emslie 22' (Bright); Bright 36' (Reid); Emslie 45'	Report		Stadium: BMO Stadium

== Statistics ==
As of matches played November 1, 2024.

=== Squad appearances ===
No	Pos	Nat	Player	Total		NWSL Regular Season		Summer Cup		NWSL Playoffs	
No	Pos	Nat	Player	Apps	Starts	Apps	Starts	Apps	Starts	Apps	Starts
Goalkeepers
1	GK	(Japan)	Hannah Stambaugh	0	0	0	0	0	0	0	0
13	GK	(Bosnia and Herzegovina)	DiDi Haračić	25	25	23	23	2	2	0	0
19	GK	(United States)	Angelina Anderson	5	5	3	3	2	2	0	0
Defenders
3	DF	(United States)	Jasmyne Spencer	28	20	24	16	4	4	0	0
5	DF	(New Zealand)	Ali Riley	5	3	5	3	0	0	0	0
6	DF	(United States)	Megan Reid	27	23	23	19	4	4	0	0
11	DF	(United States)	Sarah Gorden	28	28	24	24	3	3	0	0
12	DF	(United States)	Merritt Mathias	14	4	13	3	1	1	0	0
16	DF	(United States)	M.A. Vignola	20	11	17	10	3	1	0	0
20	DF	(United States)	Gisele Thompson	16	11	15	10	1	1	0	0
27	DF	(United States)	Madison Curry	26	23	22	20	4	3	0	0
44	DF	(United States)	Elizabeth Eddy	5	0	3	0	2	0	0	0
Midfielders
4	MF	(England)	Katie Zelem	10	8	10	8	0	0	0	0
7	MF	(Costa Rica)	Rocky Rodríguez	23	13	20	13	3	0	0	0
8	MF	(United States)	Meggie Dougherty Howard	22	18	18	14	4	4	0	0
17	MF	(United States)	Kennedy Fuller	23	14	19	10	4	4	0	0
28	MF	(United States)	Lily Nabet	16	8	13	8	3	0	0	0
99	MF	(United States)	Madison Hammond	27	13	23	15	4	4	0	0
Forwards
2	FW	(United States)	Sydney Leroux	26	19	25	19	1	0	0	0
9	FW	(South Korea)	Casey Phair	1	0	0	0	1	0	0	0
10	FW	(Scotland)	Claire Emslie	29	27	26	24	3	3	0	0
21	FW	(United States)	Alyssa Thompson	30	27	26	24	4	3	0	0
23	FW	(United States)	Christen Press	11	1	9	1	2	0	0	0
24	FW	(United States)	Messiah Bright	25	11	21	7	4	4	0	0
33	FW	(Mexico)	Katie Johnson	6	0	5	0	1	0	0	0
Other players (Departed during season, short-term loan, etc.)
4	DF	(Canada)	Vanessa Gilles	0	0	0	0	0	0	0	0
18	FW	(Japan)	Jun Endo	0	0	0	0	0	0	0	0
26	MF	(France)	Amandine Henry	4	3	4	3	0	0	0	0
29	MF	(France)	Clarisse Le Bihan	10	6	10	6	0	0	0	0
14	DF	(United States)	Paige Nielsen	3	3	3	3	0	0	0	0

=== Goals ===
Pos.	No.	Nat.	Name	NWSL	Summer Cup	Playoffs	Total
FW	10	(Scotland)	Claire Emslie	7	1	0	8
FW	2	(United States)	Sydney Leroux	7	1	0	8
FW	21	(United States)	Alyssa Thompson	5	0	0	5
MF	17	(United States)	Kennedy Fuller	1	1	0	2
FW	24	(United States)	Messiah Bright	1	0	0	1
DF	27	(United States)	Madison Curry	1	0	0	1
MF	8	(United States)	Meggie Dougherty Howard	1	0	0	1
MF	29	(France)	Clarisse Le Bihan	1	0	0	1
FW	23	(United States)	Christen Press	1	0	0	1
MF	7	(Costa Rica)	Rocky Rodriguez	1	0	0	1
DF	16	(United States)	M.A. Vignola	1	0	0	1
Own goals				2	1	0	3
Total				29	4	0	33

=== Assists ===
Pos.	No.	Nat.	Name	NWSL	Summer Cup	Playoffs	Total
FW	21	(United States)	Alyssa Thompson	7	0	0	7
MF	8	(United States)	Meggie Dougherty Howard	2	0	0	2
FW	10	(Scotland)	Claire Emslie	2	0	0	2
DF	16	(United States)	M.A. Vignola	2	0	0	2
FW	24	(United States)	Messiah Bright	0	1	0	1
DF	27	(United States)	Madison Curry	1	0	0	1
MF	99	(United States)	Madison Hammond	0	1	0	1
FW	2	(United States)	Sydney Leroux	1	0	0	1
DF	12	(United States)	Merritt Mathias	0	1	0	1
DF	5	(New Zealand)	Ali Riley	1	0	0	1
DF	20	(United States)	Gisele Thompson	1	0	0	1
MF	4	(England)	Katie Zelem	1	0	0	1
Total				18	3	—	21

=== Clean sheets ===
Pos.	No.	Nat.	Name	NWSL	Summer Cup	Playoffs	Total
GK	13	(Bosnia and Herzegovina)	DiDi Haračić	4	1	0	5
GK	1	(United States)	Angelina Anderson	0	1	0	1
Total				4	2	—	6

=== Disciplinary cards ===
Player				NWSL		Summer Cup		Playoffs		Total	
Pos.	No.	Nat.	Name	Booked	Sent off (straight red)	Booked	Sent off (straight red)	Booked	Sent off (straight red)	Booked	Sent off (straight red)
DF	27	(United States)	Madison Curry	5	0	1	0	0	0	6	0
MF	99	(United States)	Madison Hammond	5	0	1	0	0	0	6	0
FW	10	(Scotland)	Claire Emslie	3	0	1	0	0	0	4	0
MF	28	(United States)	Lily Nabet	4	0	0	0	0	0	4	0
DF	3	(United States)	Jasmyne Spencer	4	0	0	0	0	0	4	0
MF	7	(United States)	Rocky Rodríguez	3	0	0	0	0	0	3	0
FW	21	(United States)	Alyssa Thompson	2	0	1	0	0	0	3	0
DF	6	(United States)	Megan Reid	3	0	0	0	0	0	3	0
FW	24	(United States)	Messiah Bright	2	0	0	0	0	0	2	0
MF	8	(United States)	Meggie Dougherty Howard	2	0	0	0	0	0	2	0
MF	17	(United States)	Kennedy Fuller	1	0	1	0	0	0	2	0
GK	11	(Bosnia and Herzegovina)	DiDi Haračić	2	0	0	0	0	0	2	0
MF	29	(France)	Clarisse Le Bihan	2	0	0	0	0	0	2	0
MF	4	(England)	Katie Zelem	2	0	0	0	0	0	2	0
MF	26	(France)	Amandine Henry	1	0	0	0	0	0	1	0
FW	33	(Mexico)	Katie Johnson	1	0	0	0	0	0	1	0
FW	2	(United States)	Sydney Leroux	1	0	0	0	0	0	1	0
DF	12	(United States)	Merritt Mathias	1	0	0	0	0	0	1	0
DF	14	(United States)	Paige Nielsen	1	0	0	0	0	0	1	0
DF	20	(United States)	Gisele Thompson	1	0	0	0	0	0	1	0
Total				46	—	5	—	—	—	51	—

== Awards ==
=== NWSL monthly awards ===
==== Best XI of the Month ====
Month	Pos.	Nat.	Player	Ref.
July	DF	(United States) USA	Madison Curry	
July	DF	(United States) USA	Sarah Gorden	
August	MF	(United States) USA	Sarah Gorden (2)	
August	DF	(Bosnia and Herzegovina) BIH	DiDi Haračić	
August	DF	(United States) USA	Alyssa Thompson	
September	MF	(United States) USA	Alyssa Thompson (2)	

=== NWSL weekly awards ===
As of November 5, 2024.

==== Goal of the Week ====
Wk.	Nat.	Player	Won
5	(Scotland)	Claire Emslie	Nom.
16	(United States)	Alyssa Thompson	Nom.
20	(United States)	Alyssa Thompson	Nom.
22	(United States)	M.A. Vignola	Nom.
23	(United States)	Christen Press	Won
24	(United States)	Sydney Leroux	Won

==== Save of the Week ====
Wk.	Nat.	Player	Won
7	(Bosnia and Herzegovina)	DiDi Haračić	Nom.
10	(Bosnia and Herzegovina)	DiDi Haračić	Nom.
11	(Bosnia and Herzegovina)	DiDi Haračić	Nom.
13	(Bosnia and Herzegovina)	DiDi Haračić	Won
16	(Bosnia and Herzegovina)	DiDi Haračić	Won
17	(Bosnia and Herzegovina)	DiDi Haračić	Nom.
20	(Bosnia and Herzegovina)	DiDi Haračić	Nom.
23	(Bosnia and Herzegovina)	DiDi Haračić	Nom.
24	(Bosnia and Herzegovina)	DiDi Haračić	Nom.

=== ESPY Awards ===
- Sports Humanitarian Team of the Year
