= Gisele Thompson =

American soccer player (born 2005)

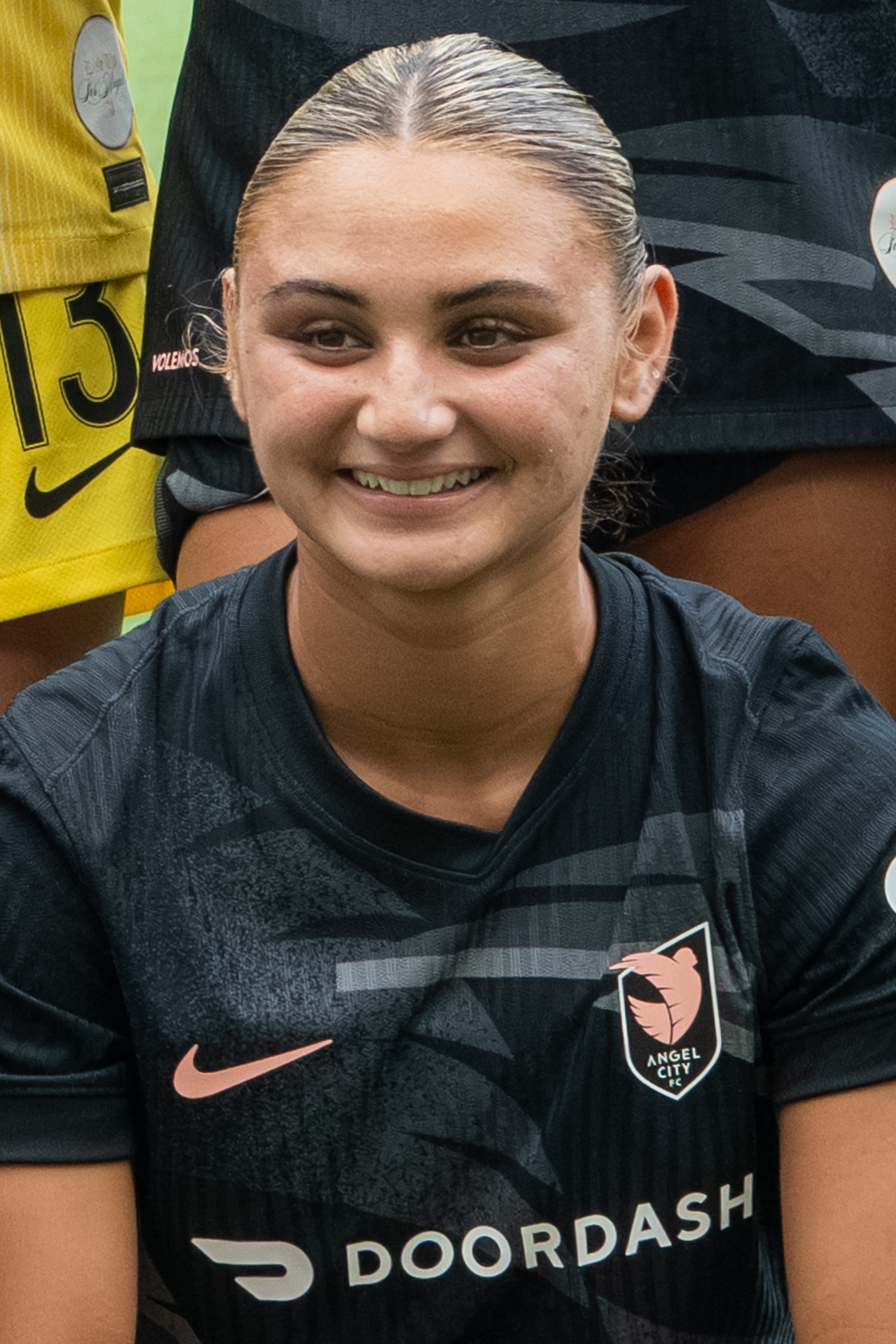
- Thompson with Angel City in 2025

Personal information
- Full name: Gisele Olivia Thompson
- Date of birth: December 2, 2005 (age 20)
- Place of birth: Los Angeles, California, U.S.
- Height: 5 ft 4 in (1.63 m)
- Position: Right back

Team information
- Current team: Angel City
- Number: 20

Youth career
- Total Futbol Academy
- Real So Cal

Senior career*
Years	Team	Apps	(Gls)
2022–2023	Santa Clarita Blue Heat		
2024–	Angel City	68	(6)

International career^{‡}
2019	United States U15	1	(0)
2020	United States U16	3	(0)
2022	United States U17	14	(1)
2023	United States U19	5	(0)
2023–2024	United States U20	14	(2)
2025–	United States U23	1	(0)
2025–	United States	13	(0)
Medal record
Women's soccer
Pan American Games
Bronze medal – third place	2023 Santiago	Team
FIFA U-20 Women's World Cup
Bronze medal – third place	Colombia 2024
- * Club domestic league appearances and goals as of 06:12, November 12, 2026 (UTC) ‡ National team caps and goals as of October 13, 2026

Gisele Olivia Thompson (born December 2, 2005) is an American professional soccer player who plays as a right back for Angel City FC of the National Women's Soccer League (NWSL) and the United States national team.

Thompson and her older sister, Alyssa, were two of the first high school athletes to have name, image, and likeness (NIL) deals with Nike. At age 17, she joined her sister at Angel City FC in 2023. She won bronze medals with the youth national team at the 2023 Pan American Games and the 2024 FIFA U-20 Women's World Cup.

== Early life ==
In 2013, Thompson's parents registered her and her sister Alyssa in the Total Futbol Academy (TFA) when Thompson was eight years old so that they could compete on boys' teams. In 2015, they were transferred to club Real So Cal of the Elite Clubs National League and they competed there until the COVID-19 pandemic halted sporting events. The two sisters then joined the Santa Clarita Blue Heat in the second-division United Women's Soccer league as the only high school students in the league. In early 2023, Thompson began training with NWSL team Angel City FC, who had drafted Alyssa as the number one pick in the 2023 NWSL Draft.

== Club career ==
=== Angel City FC, 2024– ===
On December 7, 2023, Angel City FC announced that they had signed Thompson to a three-year professional contract. She had previously been committed to play college soccer at Stanford. NWSL rules allowed ACFC to sign Thompson directly, rather than through the entry draft, because she was under the age of 18 at the time. Her deal runs through the 2025 season, with an option to extend through 2026.

Thompson made her professional debut for Angel City in her hometown of Los Angeles on March 17, 2024, coming on as a substitute for her older sister in a NWSL match against Bay FC.

After missing a few games due to a minor ankle injury, Thompson started her first match for Angel City on May 18, 2024, in an away match against Washington Spirit which ended as a 4–2 defeat. As she was named to the starting XI alongside her sister, it marked the first time in NWSL history that two sisters were named to the starting lineup for the same team. Thompson recorded her first NWSL assist on October 20, 2024, during the final home match of the 2024 season against Utah Royals, setting up Sydney Leroux's equalizer to secure a 1–1 draw. The goal was also the 100th goal in Angel City's history. Thompson scored her first pro goal on May 2, 2025, against the Washington Spirit, on an assist from her sister Alyssa—making them the first sisters to combine for a goal in the history of the NWSL. Angel City went on to win the match, 4-3. On June 6, 2025, Thompson was named to the NWSL Best XI of the month for the first time, for a goal and two assist across four matches in May. On September 5, 2025, she signed a new contract with Angel City, extending her time with the club through 2029, and making her one of the highest-paid players in the NWSL.

== International career ==
Thompson represented the United States on the U-17 women's national team at the 2022 FIFA U-17 World Cup and the 2022 CONCACAF Women's U-17 Championship. She also played on the under-20 national team at the 2023 CONCACAF Women's U-20 Championship, where they won gold. In the semifinals, she received a red card after she fouled to prevent a clear chance at goal.

In February 2024, Thompson received her first call up to the senior team as a non-rostered player to train with the team ahead of the 2024 CONCACAF W Gold Cup. Thompson went straight from training with the senior team in Los Angeles to train with the under-20 team for a set of friendlies against Colombia in Bogota. She was selected to the roster for the 2024 FIFA U-20 Women's World Cup. In the group stage, she provided an assist to Yuna McCormack for the opening goal in a 2–0 win over Morocco. In the next game, she scored the third goal in the team's 7–0 victory over Paraguay to secure the second place in their group and their spot in the knockout rounds. She assisted Ally Sentnor to open a 2–1 win over the Netherlands in the third place game, marking the United States's best result at the tournament since 2012.

On February 11, 2025, Thompson received her first official call up with the senior team as part of the 23-player roster for the 2025 SheBelieves Cup. She was called-up alongside her older sister Alyssa, marking the third time sisters have been called up to same roster on the senior team. Thompson officially made her senior team debut on February 20, 2025 coming on a substitute for Jenna Nighswonger in the first SheBelieves match against Colombia which finished as a 2–0 victory. A few days later on February 23, 2025, Thompson started the match against Australia alongside her sister, becoming the second pair of sisters to play in the same match for the senior team.

== Personal life ==
Thompson was born in Los Angeles on December 2, 2005, 13 months after her sister Alyssa Thompson, to Karen and Mario Thompson. They are of African-American, Filipino and Peruvian descent.

Thompson ran track at Harvard-Westlake School.

=== Endorsements ===
In 2022, Thompson and her sister Alyssa signed a name, image, and likeness (NIL) deal with Nike at ages 16 and 17, respectively. They were the first high school athletes to sign an NIL deal with Nike.

Both sisters are also sponsored by Stifel.

=== Television and film ===
Gisele appeared alongside her sister Alyssa as cameos in the Netflix film Family Switch.

== Career statistics ==
=== Club ===
As of match played October 3, 2026

Appearances and goals by club, season and competition
Club	Season	League			National cup		Playoffs		Other		Total	
Club	Season	Division	Apps	Goals	Apps	Goals	Apps	Goals	Apps	Goals	Apps	Goals
Angel City FC	2024	NWSL	15	0	—		—		1 (Note: Appearance in NWSL x Liga MX Femenil Summer Cup)	0	16	0
Angel City FC	2025	NWSL	23	1	—		—		—		23	1
Angel City FC	2026	NWSL	27	4	—		—		—		27	4
Career total			65	5	0	0	0	0	1	0	66	5

=== International ===
As of match played October 13, 2026

Appearances and goals by national team and year
National Team	Year	Apps	Goals
United States	2025	4	0
United States	2026	9	0
Total		13	0

== Honors ==
United States U17

- CONCACAF Women's U-17 Championship: 2022

United States U19

- Pan American Games Bronze Medal: 2023

United States U20

- CONCACAF Women's U-20 Championship: 2023
- FIFA U-20 Women's World Cup Bronze Medal: 2024

United States

- SheBelieves Cup: 2026

Individual

- NWSL Team of the Month: May 2025
- NWSL Best XI Second Team: 2026
