= M.A. Vignola =

American soccer player (born 1998)

- Vignola with Portland Thorns in 2026

Personal information
- Full name: Mary Alice Vignola
- Date of birth: February 11, 1998 (age 28)
- Place of birth: Cincinnati, Ohio, United States
- Height: 5 ft 6 in (1.68 m)
- Position: Defender

Team information
- Current team: Portland Thorns
- Number: 25

Youth career
- Ohio Elite
- 2013 - 2016: St. Ursula Academy

College career
Years	Team	Apps	(Gls)
2016–2019	Tennessee Volunteers	40	(12)

Senior career*
Years	Team	Apps	(Gls)
2020	Þróttur	12	(6)
2021	Valur	18	(2)
2022–2025	Angel City FC	57	(5)
2025–	Portland Thorns	32	(1)

International career^{‡}
	United States U17	1	(0)
2023–	United States	1	(0)
- * Club domestic league appearances and goals as of 18:03, November 11, 2026 (UTC) ‡ National team caps and goals as of September 21, 2023

Mary Alice Vignola (born February 11, 1998) is an American professional soccer player who plays as a defender for Portland Thorns FC of the National Women's Soccer League (NWSL) and the United States national team. She played college soccer for the Tennessee Volunteers. Vignola has previously played for Icelandic clubs Þróttur and Valur, as well as Angel City FC.

== Early life ==
Born in Cincinnati, Ohio, Vignola was adopted at birth. She is a biracial African American, and her adoptive parents are white. She has an older brother who is also adopted. Vignola began playing soccer recreationally when she was five years old. She played youth soccer for Ohio Elite, competing in the Elite Clubs National League as a forward. She also played high school soccer for St. Ursula Academy in Cincinnati, scoring 35 goals and being credited with 26 assists in her high school career.

== College career ==
Vignola played in NCAA Division I for the Tennessee Volunteers women's soccer team. During her sophomore season, she switched positions from forward to outside back. In 2019, the Southeastern Conference named her to the All-SEC first team.

== Club career ==
=== Þróttur ===
Vignola declined to register for the 2019 NWSL College Draft and sought playing opportunities overseas.

In 2020, Vignola signed with Icelandic club Knattspyrnufélagið Þróttur, competing in the Úrvalsdeild kvenna, where she scored six goals in 12 appearances. She scored her first professional goal on June 23, 2020, a long-range equalizing goal during second-half stoppage time in a 2–2 draw against Fylkir.

=== Valur ===
In 2021, Vignola transferred to Icelandic competitors Valur. She tore her right acetabular labrum in her first match with the club but continued playing through the injury, scoring two goals in 18 appearances and winning the Úrvalsdeild kvenna. After winning the league, Vignola competed in the 2021–22 UEFA Women's Champions League with Valur.

=== Angel City ===
NWSL expansion club Angel City FC recruited Vignola and signed her on December 5, 2021, making her the team's second-ever player signing after Christen Press. The team was required to negotiate a trade of $30,000 in NWSL allocation money and protection in the 2022 NWSL Expansion Draft with the Washington Spirit, which had acquired the rights to sign Vignola through the league's discovery process. The club provided rehabilitation services for her hip injury, and she debuted late in her rookie season on September 5, 2022, as an 80th-minute substitute for Madison Hammond in the 2022 Copa Angelina against the Mexico women's national football team.

External videos
- Vignola's goal against San Diego Wave on June, 2023 retrieved March 23, 2024

Vignola made her first start for Angel City on April 15, 2023, against Racing Louisville FC. On June 10, 2023, she scored her first goal for Angel City in a 1–2 loss against Washington Spirit. A week later, she scored the match-winning goal against rivals San Diego Wave FC. Vignola was named to the NWSL 2023 Best XI Second team at the conclusion of the 2023 season, contributing 3 goals and 1 assist in Angel City's first run to the playoffs.

Vignola dealt with injuries during the 2024 season but managed to contribute 1 goal and 2 assists with her limited playing time, including the match winner against Chicago Red Stars on September 1, 2024. After the conclusion of the season, on December 16, 2024, Angel City announced they had signed a new two-year contract with Vignola, keeping her with Angel City until 2026.

=== Portland Thorns ===
On September 30, 2025, Vignola was traded to the Portland Thorns in a transaction that also involved Angel City acquiring Hina Sugita.

== International career ==
External videos
- USWNT First Cap: M.A. Vignola retrieved on March 23, 2024

Vignola earned her first United States youth camp call-up when she was 14 years old. She played for the United States women's national under-17 soccer team in a match against Germany.

Vignola earned a senior national team call-up in September 2023. She made her international debut in her hometown of Cincinnati, OH on September 21, 2023, during a match against South Africa.

== Career statistics ==
=== Club ===
As of September 13, 2025

Appearances and goals by club, season and competition
Club	Season	League			Cup (Note: Includes the NWSL Challenge Cup.)		Playoffs (Note: Includes NWSL Playoffs.)		Continental (Note: Includes the UEFA Women's Champions League)		Total	
Club	Season	Division	Apps	Goals	Apps	Goals	Apps	Goals	Apps	Goals	Apps	Goals
Þróttur	2020	Úrvalsdeild kvenna	12	6	—		—		—		12	6
Valur	2021	Úrvalsdeild kvenna	18	2	—		—		1	0	19	2
Angel City FC	2022	NWSL	2	0	0	0	—		—		2	0
Angel City FC	2023	NWSL	18	3	3	0	1	0	—		22	3
Angel City FC	2024	NWSL	17	1	3	0	—		—		20	1
Angel City FC	2025	NWSL	19	1	—		—		—		19	1
Angel City FC	Total		56	5	6	0	1	0	—		63	5
Career total			86	13	6	0	1	0	1	0	94	13

=== International ===
As of match played September 21, 2023

National Team	Year	Apps	Goals
United States	2023	1	0
Total		1	0

== Honors ==
Valur

- Úrvalsdeild kvenna: 2021

Individual

- All-SEC second team: 2018
- All-SEC first team: 2019
- NWSL Team of the Month: June 2023, September/October 2023
- NWSL Best XI Second Team: 2023
