= DiDi Haračić =

American-Bosnian footballer (born 1992)

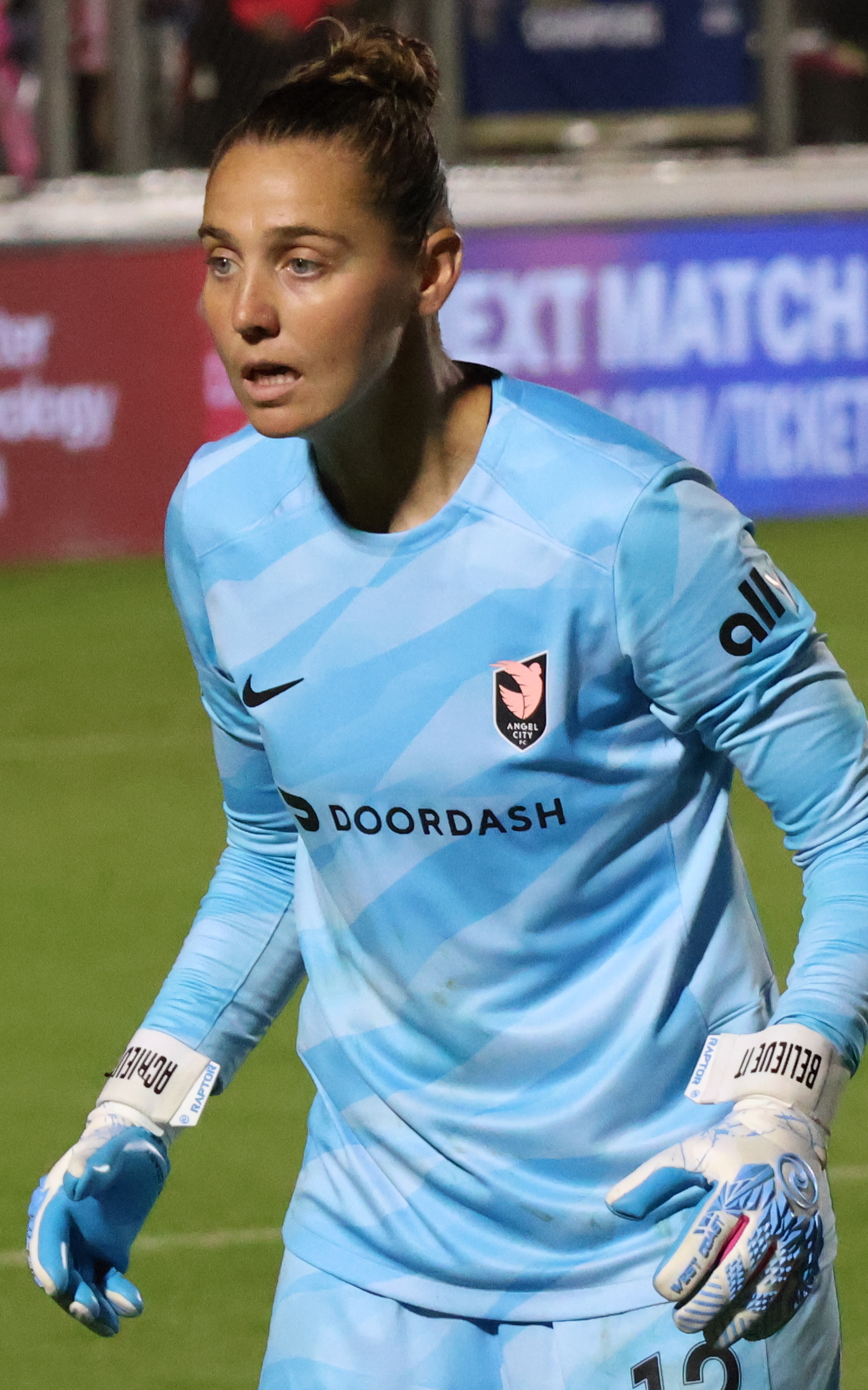
- Haračić with Angel City in 2024

Personal information
- Full name: Dijana Haračić
- Date of birth: 12 April 1992 (age 34)
- Place of birth: Sarajevo, Bosnia and Herzegovina
- Height: 5 ft 9 in (1.75 m)
- Position: Goalkeeper

Team information
- Current team: San Diego Wave
- Number: 31

College career
Years	Team	Apps	(Gls)
2010–2013	Loyola Greyhounds	71	(0)

Senior career*
Years	Team	Apps	(Gls)
2011–2012	D.C. United Women	7	(0)
2013	Washington Spirit Reserves	12	(0)
2014	Western New York Flash	1	(0)
2015	Krokom/Dvärsätts IF		
2016	Washington Spirit Reserves		
2017–2018	Washington Spirit	9	(0)
2019–2021	Gotham FC	19	(0)
2022–2024	Angel City FC	62	(0)
2025–	San Diego Wave	9	(0)

International career
2018–2021	Bosnia and Herzegovina	8	(0)
- * Club domestic league appearances and goals as of 16:41, November 15, 2026 (UTC)

Dijana "DiDi" Haračić (born 12 April 1992) is a Bosnian professional footballer who plays as a goalkeeper for San Diego Wave FC of the National Women's Soccer League (NWSL).

== Early life ==
Born in Sarajevo, Haračić moved to the United States at the age of two during the Bosnian War. Haračić, her mother, and older sister Anja fled Bosnia shortly after her birth and eventually landed in Germany. Her father, Izet Haračić, played professional football in Germany and represented Bosnia and Herzegovina at the 1994 Winter Olympics as a bobsledder.

== College career ==
Haračić played for Loyola University Maryland between 2010 and 2013. During that time, she established herself as the first choice keeper for the Greyhounds. She was named MAAC Player of the Year in 2012 and helped the Greyhounds to a MAAC Championship and Women's NCAA tournament.

== Club career ==
=== D.C. United ===
Haračić started her professional career with D.C. United Women between 2011 and 2012 where she would make 7 appearances during that time. When the D.C. United Women rebranded as the Washington Spirit in 2013 to compete in the newly formed NWSL, Haračić stayed with the organization as the starting keeper for the Reserves playing all 12 matches and posting a 0.580 goals against average.

=== Western New York Flash ===
During the 2014 season, Haračić signed with the Western New York Flash. Her Flash career would be hampered by a knee injury, limiting her only appearance for the Flash to the season finale, a 3–3 draw against the Chicago Red Stars. Haračić was waived at the conclusion of the season.

=== Krokom/Dvärsätts IF ===
Haračić would end up signing with Div 2 Södra Norrland side Krokom/Dvärsätt IF.

=== Return to Washington Spirit ===
In 2016, Haračić returned to the Washington Spirit organization, playing for the Reserves in the WPSL. Ahead of the 2017 season, Haračić signed with the first team. Over two seasons with the Spirit, Haračić made 9 appearances.

=== NJ/NY Gotham FC ===
In January 2019, Haračić was traded to Sky Blue FC along with teammates Estelle Johnson and Caprice Dydasco for the third overall and 29th picks of the 2019 NWSL College Draft.

=== Angel City ===
On 8 December 2021, Haračić was traded to Angel City FC. In the 2022 season, she appeared in 21 of 22 regular season matches and played 1,890 minutes. Haračić finished the season with 70 saves, four clean sheets, and fifth overall in the league in terms of save percentage. On 3 March 2023, Haračić agreed to a contract extension with Angel City FC through 2024, with an option for 2025.

Haračić made her first appearance of the 2024 season on 13 April 2024, in an away match against the Chicago Red Stars, which ended as a 1–0 victory, securing the teams first clean sheet and win of the season. Haračić made her 50th regular season appearance for Angel City on 11 June 2024, in an away match against Bay FC which finished as a 0–1 loss. Haračić is the first player to reach 50 regular-season appearances for Angel City. On 6 September 2024, Haračić was named to the NWSL Team of the Month for the first time in her career for her performances in the month of August 2024, she recorded 10 saves in three games played with one clean sheet, and added three punches in 270 minutes played. On 10 December 2024, Angel City announced that Haračić would not be returning to the club for the 2025 season and that she would become a free agent. At the time of her departure, Haračić led Angel City with the most all-time regular season appearances with 62, and second overall across all competitions.

=== San Diego Wave ===
On 20 January 2025, Haračić signed a one-year contract with fellow Californian club San Diego Wave FC. She debuted for the Wave on September 21, 2025, playing the entirety of a 1–1 draw with the Portland Thorns. She made one more appearance in her first season with San Diego as former Gotham FC teammate Kailen Sheridan consumed the lion's share of Wave minutes.

== International career ==
Haračić was called up to the Bosnia and Herzegovina national team and in 2018 she started in goal for a World Cup qualifying match against Russia.

== Personal life ==
Haračić is openly gay and has served as an Ambassador for Athlete Ally.

== Honors ==
- NWSL Team of the Month: August 2024
