= Madison Curry =

American soccer player (born 2001)

- Curry with the Seattle Reign in 2026

Personal information
- Full name: Madison Rose Curry
- Date of birth: January 23, 2001 (age 25)
- Place of birth: Coto de Caza, California
- Height: 5 ft 5 in (1.65 m)
- Positions: Left back; center back; right back

Team information
- Current team: Seattle Reign
- Number: 24

College career
Years	Team	Apps	(Gls)
2019–2023	Princeton Tigers	51	(3)

Senior career*
Years	Team	Apps	(Gls)
2024	Angel City FC	22	(1)
2025–	Seattle Reign	53	(0)
- * Club domestic league appearances and goals as of 16:31, November 8, 2026 (UTC)

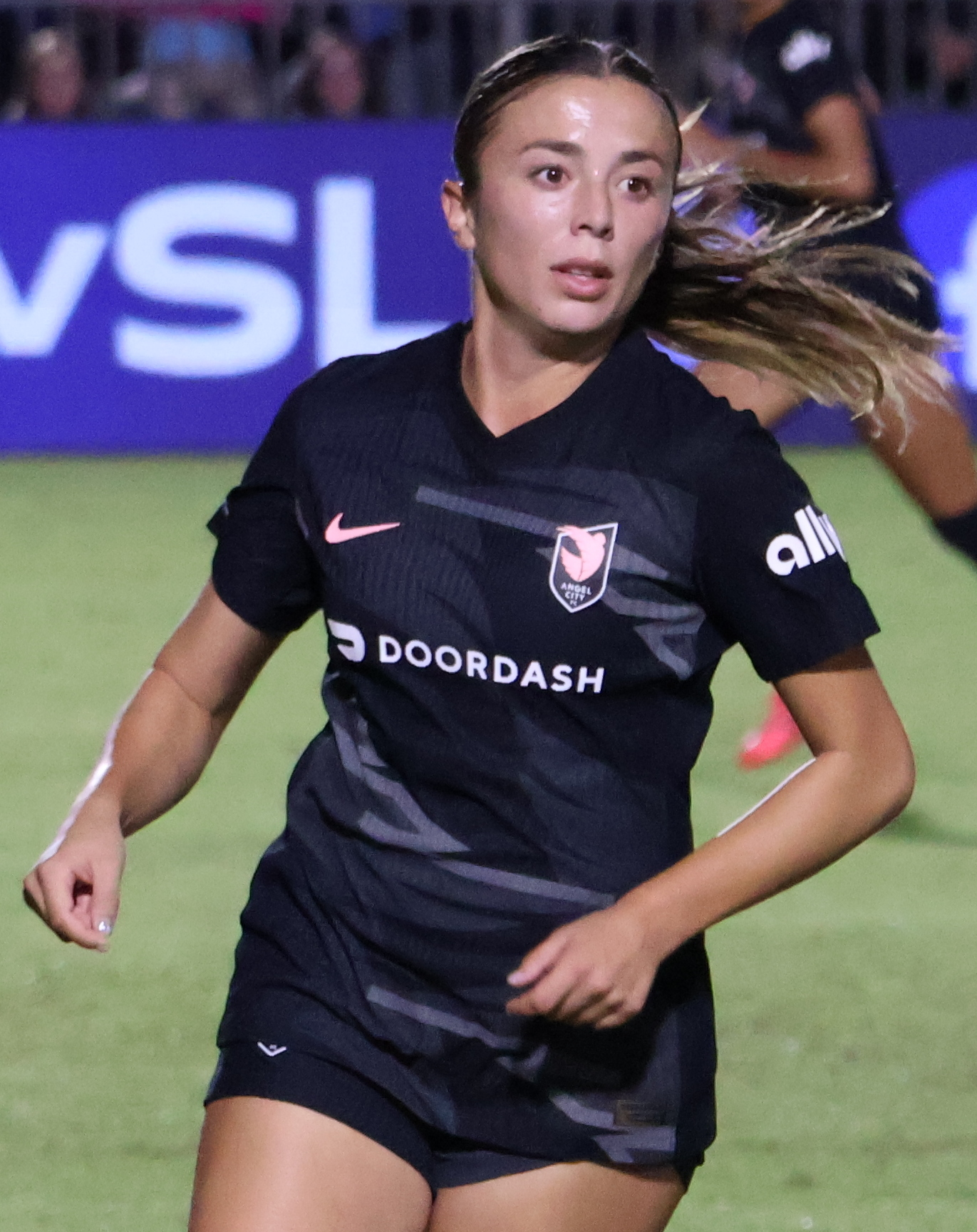
Curry with Angel City in 2024

Madison Rose Curry (born January 23, 2001) is an American professional soccer player who plays as a defender for Seattle Reign FC of the National Women's Soccer League (NWSL). She played college soccer for the Princeton Tigers and was drafted by Angel City FC in the 2024 NWSL Draft.

== Early life and college career ==
Curry grew up in Coto de Caza, California. Curry was selected to the US Youth Soccer Region 4 Olympic Development Program (ODP) team in 2014, 2015, and 2016, helping them win a US Youth Soccer ODP National Championship in 2016. She also led the Santa Margarita Catholic High School team to a California Interscholastic Federation Championship in 2016 and served as team captain in 2019, earning a 2019 Southern California High School All-Star Team selection and the 46th overall spot in the TopDrawerSoccer Class of 2019 National Rankings.

=== Princeton Tigers ===
Curry attended Princeton, playing three years of Ivy League soccer appearing in a total of 41 matches. She made First Team All-Ivy League selections in every year of her eligibility. And in 2023, while being the Princeton co-captain, earned the honors of being selected to Third Team All-American and All-East Region Second Team.

== Club career ==
=== Angel City FC ===
NWSL team Angel City FC, based in Los Angeles, selected Curry as the 51st overall pick in the 2024 NWSL Draft and signed her to a one-year contract. Curry made her first start and also scored her first goal for Angel City on March 30, 2024, in a match against Kansas City Current which finished as a 4–2 defeat. Curry was named to the NWSL's July 2024 Best XI of the Month, she recorded five tackles won along with eight interceptions, and played a total of 256 minutes during the month helping Angel City to an undefeated run in the NWSL x LIGA MX Femenil Summer Cup group stage. She finished her rookie season as Angel City's leader in duels won, tackles won, and interceptions in 22 appearances (20 starts) as the club placed 12th place of 14 teams.

=== Seattle Reign ===
On December 4, 2024, Seattle Reign FC announced the signing of Curry as a free agent to a three-year contract.

On October 20, 2026, Curry signed a one-year contract extension with the Reign through 2028.

== Career statistics ==
=== Club ===
As of October 20, 2024

Appearances and goals by club, season and competition
Club	Season	League			Cup (Note: Includes the NWSL Challenge Cup.)		Playoffs (Note: Includes NWSL Playoffs.)		Total	
Club	Season	Division	Apps	Goals	Apps	Goals	Apps	Goals	Apps	Goals
Angel City FC	2024	NWSL	22	1	4	0	—		26	1
Career total			22	1	4	0	0	0	26	1

== Honors ==
Individual

- NWSL Team of the Month: July 2024
