= Alyssa Thompson =

American soccer player (born 2004)

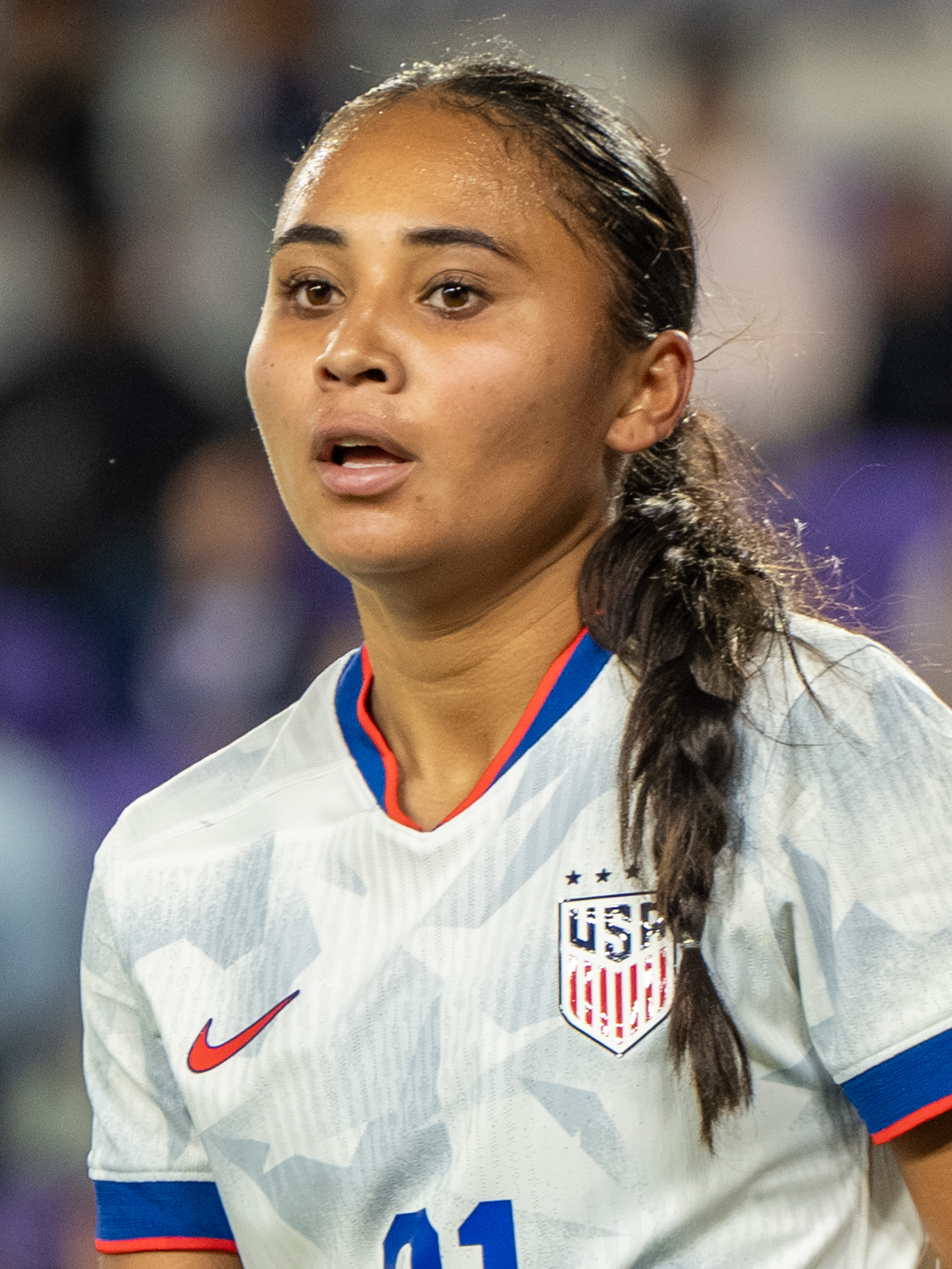
- Thompson with the United States in 2025

Personal information
- Full name: Alyssa Paola Thompson
- Date of birth: November 7, 2004 (age 22)
- Place of birth: Los Angeles, California, U.S.
- Height: 5 ft 4 in (1.63 m)
- Position: Forward

Team information
- Current team: Chelsea
- Number: 12

Youth career
- 2013–2015: Total Futbol Academy
- 2015–2020: Real So Cal
- 2020–2023: Total Futbol Academy

Senior career*
Years	Team	Apps	(Gls)
2023–2025	Angel City	62	(15)
2025–	Chelsea	31	(8)

International career^{‡}
2022–	United States U20	8	(4)
2022–	United States	34	(4)
- * Club domestic league appearances and goals as of November 21, 2026 ‡ National team caps and goals as of October 13, 2026

Alyssa Paola Thompson (born November 7, 2004) is an American professional soccer player who plays as a forward for Women's Super League club Chelsea and the United States women's national team. She was named the national Gatorade Player of the Year in 2021. She was selected first overall in the 2023 NWSL Draft by Angel City while in high school.

== Early life ==
Raised in Studio City, California in the Los Angeles area, Alyssa attended The Wesley School in North Hollywood. At age eight, she raced against the fastest boy at the school and won. Thompson's parents Karen and Mario signed Alyssa and her sister Gisele up to Total Futbol Academy (TFA) in 2013, when Alyssa Thompson was nine years old, for them to compete on boys' teams. After two years, they transferred to Elite Clubs National League club Real So Cal, where they played until the COVID-19 pandemic. By the age of 13, Thompson was playing with players four years older than she was. Thompson returned to TFA in 2020 and played for its under-19 team in the MLS Next league at the age of 17, and was the only female player in the league.

Thompson attended and played for Harvard-Westlake School during her freshman and sophomore years of high school and scored 48 goals in 18 games. National team and club soccer prevented her from playing during her junior season. She was drafted to professional play as a high school senior.

Thompson was named Gatorade Player of the Year in April 2021.

== Club career ==
In 2020, at the age of 15, Thompson verbally committed to joining the Cardinal of Stanford University starting in the 2023 season. However, she later decommitted to enter the 2023 NWSL Draft.

=== Angel City ===
On January 12, 2023, Angel City selected Thompson as the first overall pick in the 2023 NWSL Draft. As part of a three-team trade, Angel City had sent a total of $450,000 to Portland Thorns and Gotham FC to secure the No. 1 pick. At the time, this trade made Thompson "essentially the most expensive player in league history", which was a record previously set by Alex Morgan. Thompson signed a three-year deal with the club.

External videos
- Alyssa Thompson's first professional goal with Angel City FC retrieved June 23, 2023

While still attending her senior year of high school at Harvard-Westlake, Thompson scored five minutes into her professional debut with Angel City, in a friendly match against Club América of the Liga MX Femenil. Thompson scored a goal eleven minutes into her NWSL regular-season debut on March 26, 2023, in a 1–2 loss against NJ/NY Gotham. On April 11, she scored the game-opener against the Portland Thorns. She was named NWSL Rookie of the Month for her performance during March–April 2023. Thompson's third regular season goal was the opening goal in the team's 3–2 win against the Kansas City Current. On June 5, she provided the assist for Sydney Leroux's first goal and game of the season (after returning from an ankle injury in the previous season). Thompson finished her first season for Angel City with four goals and two assists in regular-season games on the way to the clubs first playoffs appearance, and was also named as one of the nominees for Rookie of the Year at the conclusion of the season.

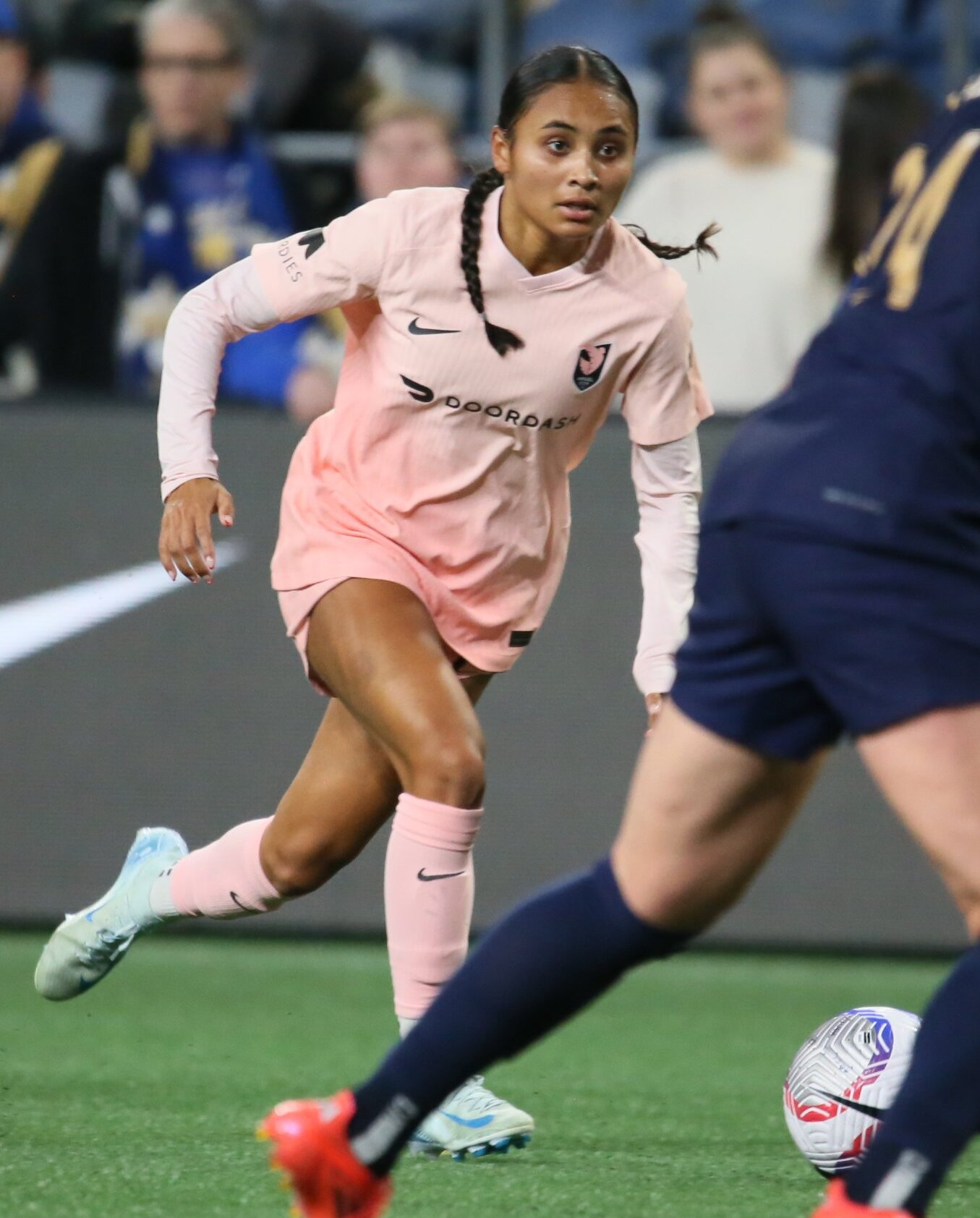
Thompson playing for Angel City in 2024

On May 3, 2024, in Angel City's first game against the Utah Royals, Thompson made her third assist of the season, and became the youngest player in NWSL history and the first player for Angel City to record assists in three consecutive matches. On May 18, 2024, in an away match against the Washington Spirit, Thompson started alongside her younger sister Gisele, which marked the first time in NWSL history that two sisters had been named to the starting lineup of the same team. Thompson converted her first penalty kick for Angel City on August 1, 2024, in a shootout against the San Diego Wave during the 2024 NWSL x Liga MX Femenil Summer Cup to ensure a spot in the knockout stage of the tournament. Thompson also convereted her first non-shootout penalty for Angel City a few weeks later in a friendly against Liga MX Femenil team Juárez on August 18, 2024, her first goal of the 2024 season.

Thompson scored her first career brace and her first regular-season goals of the 2024 season on August 24, 2024, in an away match against the San Diego Waveto secure a 1–2 victory. Thompson became the second teenager after Mallory Swanson to score multiple goals in a regular-season NWSL match. On September 6, 2024, Thompson was named to the NWSL Team of the Month for the first time for the month of August 2024, playing in three games throughout August, Thompson registered eleven tackles won and six shots, three on target. Thompson notched three goals and one assist throughout September to make the Best XI in back-to-back months. Thompson concluded her sophomore season with a record of five goals and seven assists, securing the second-highest assist total in the league, while also leading Angel City in total goal contributions.

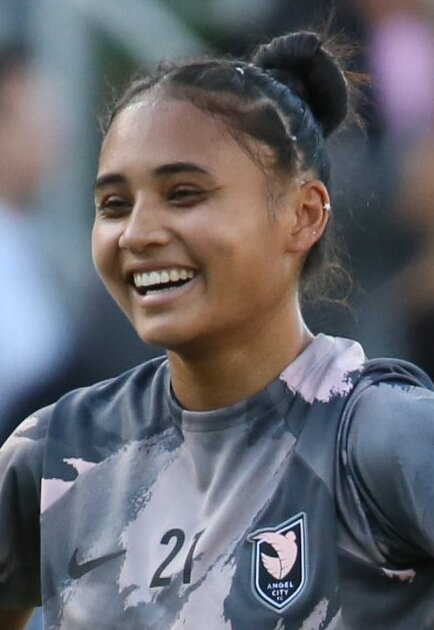
Thompson playing for Angel City in 2024

On January 29, 2025, ahead of the 2025 season, Angel City announced they had signed a contract extension with Thompson, keeping her and her sister at the club until 2028. On April 12, 2025, Thompson made her 50th-regular season appearance in the NWSL, and contributed an assist and a goal in a 3–1 victory against the Houston Dash, and also became the second-youngest player to reach 10 goals and 10 assists in the NWSL. On May 2, 2025, Thompson assisted her sisters first NWSL goal in a 4–3 victory against the Washington Spirit, and became the first sisters to combine for a goal in the NWSL. On May 24, 2025, Thompson converted her penalty kick against Racing Louisville, to score the 100th regular-season goal in Angel City's history, and with her goal became the all-time leading regular-season goal scorer for Angel City, ultimately the match ended as a 2–3 defeat. The goal was also Thompson's 25th goal contribution in the NWSL regular season, and made her the youngest player to reach the milestone. On July 26, 2025, Thompson scored her first professional hat-trick, in a friendly against Carolina Ascent at the BMO Stadium.

=== Chelsea ===
In September 2025, Thompson entered into talks with English club Chelsea regarding a potential transfer. On September 5, 2025, it was officially announced that Chelsea had signed her for a club record fee of just under £1m from Angel City, with the club unveiling her to fans at Stamford Bridge prior to their first WSL match of the season against Manchester City on the same day. Thompson made her debut for Chelsea on September 14 during a 3–1 WSL victory against Aston Villa. She scored her first goal for the club on October 15, in the Champions League.

On March 15, 2026, Thompson won her first trophy with Chelsea after starting in the 2025–26 FA Women's League Cup final in which she helped her team beat Manchester United 2–0 at Ashton Gate.

== International career ==
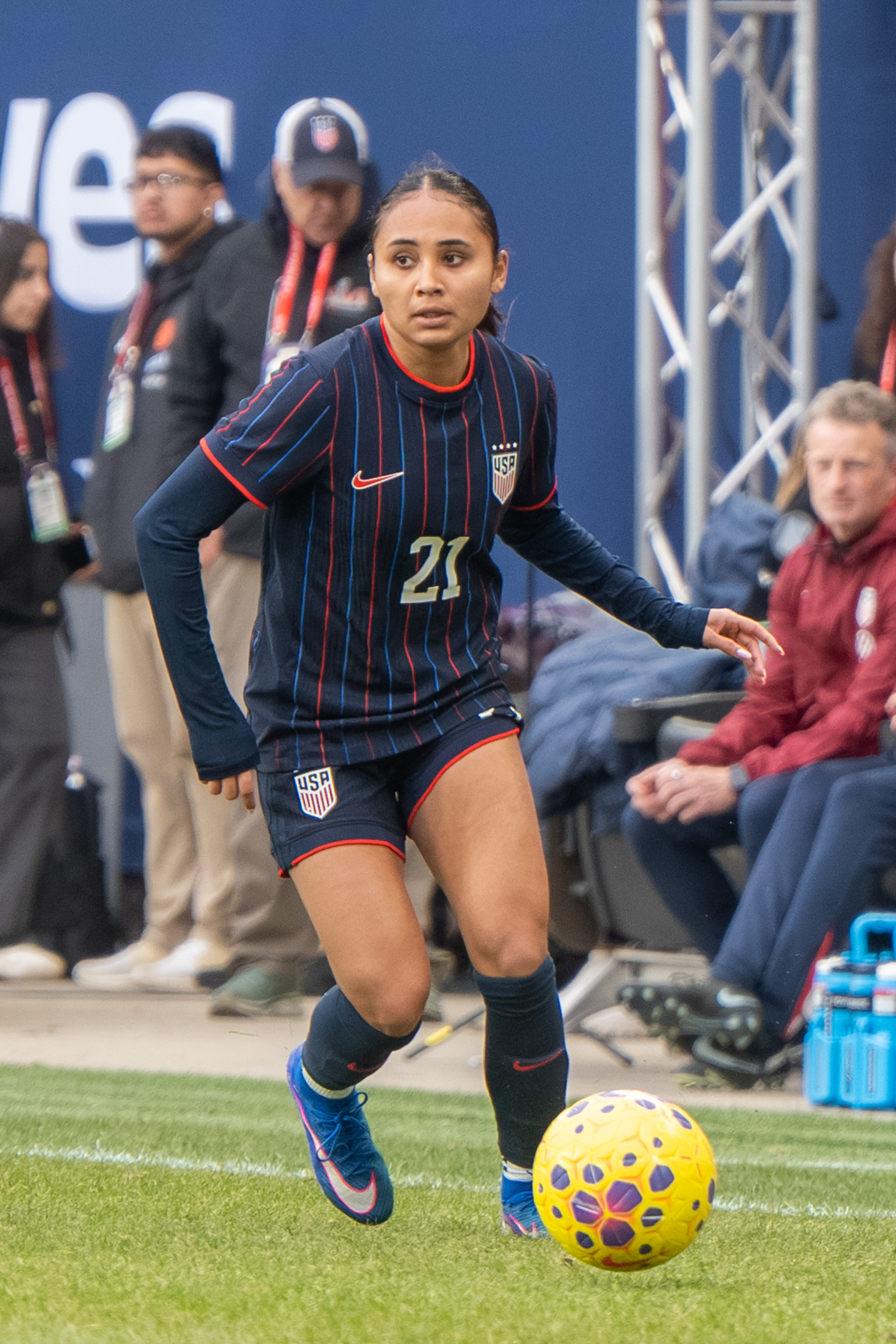
Thompson in 2026

Thompson has represented the United States on the United States senior national team as well as the under-20 national team.

In 2022, she helped lead the under-20 national team to win gold at the 2022 CONCACAF Women's U-20 Championship, playing in five matches and scoring three goals. At the 2022 FIFA U-20 Women's World Cup in Costa Rica, she played in three matches and scored one goal.

External videos
- Alyssa Thompson's national team debut at Wembley Stadium retrieved June 23, 2023

Thompson was called up to the senior national team in September 2022 and was the youngest player since Sophia Smith in 2017. On October 7, 2022, she made her senior national team debut at Wembley during a friendly against England in front of 90,000 fans.

On April 9, 2023, Thompson was called up to the senior team to replace an injured Mallory Swanson in a friendly scheduled for April 11 against Ireland. In June of the same year, she was named to the U.S. squad for the 2023 FIFA Women's World Cup in Australia and New Zealand. She made her debut during the team's first group stage match, a 3–0 win against Vietnam.

Thompson recorded her first assist for the senior national team on October 29, 2023, setting up Jaedyn Shaw's goal in a 3–0 win in a friendly against Colombia. After missing the 2024 CONCACAF W Gold Cup due to a minor back injury, Thompson was called back into the national team in October 2024 for the teams Olympic gold medal victory tour. In what was her tenth cap, Thompson scored her first international goal against Iceland, the first goal in the match to secure a 3–1 victory.

On February 11, 2025, Thompson was called up for the 2025 SheBelieves Cup. She was called up alongside her younger sister Gisele for the first time, which marked the third time sisters have been called up to the same roster on the US senior team. On February 20, 2025, Alyssa started the second SheBelieves Cup match against Australia alongside her sister, and they became the second pair of sisters to play for the national team in the same match.

On March 7, 2026, Thompson scored an 82nd minute winning goal vs Colombia to earn her country a 1–0 victory which helped the USWNT win the SheBelieves Cup for the eighth time overall and was named Most Valuable Player of the tournament.

== Playing style ==
In July 2023, the BBC said that her "pace and tenacity are stand-out features".

== Personal life ==
Thompson is of African-American, Filipino and Peruvian descent. Her parents are Mario and Karen and she has two younger sisters, Gisele and Zoe. Gisele plays for Angel City.

Thompson also runs track, and in April 2022, ran 100m in 11.74 seconds, which was the second fastest 100m sprint in 2022 up to that date in California.

=== Endorsements ===
In May 2022, Thompson and her sister Gisele signed a name, image, and likeness deal with Nike at ages 17 and 16 respectively, becoming the first high school athletes to do so. In July 2023, she appeared in a commercial for Volkswagen.

=== Television and film ===
Thompson was featured in episode three of the documentary series Angel City in 2023.

Thompson appeared in the Netflix documentary series Under Pressure: The U.S. Women's World Cup Team, which followed the U.S. women's national team as they competed in the 2023 FIFA Women's World Cup. She also appeared alongside her sister Gisele as cameos in the Netflix film Family Switch.

== Career statistics ==
=== Club ===
As of match played November 21, 2026

Appearances and goals by club, season and competition
Club	Season	League			National cup (Note: Includes NWSL Challenge Cup, Women's FA Cup)		League cup (Note: Includes FA Women's League Cup)		Continental		Other		Total	
Club	Season	Division	Apps	Goals	Apps	Goals	Apps	Goals	Apps	Goals	Apps	Goals	Apps	Goals
Angel City	2023	NWSL	20	4	2	0	—		—		1 (Note: Appearance in NWSL Playoffs)	0	23	4
Angel City	2024	NWSL	26	5	—		—		—		4 (Note: Appearances in NWSL x Liga MX Femenil Summer Cup)	0	30	5
Angel City	2025	NWSL	16	6	—		—		—		—		16	6
Angel City	Total		62	15	2	0	0	0	0	0	5	0	69	15
Chelsea	2025–26	Women's Super League	20	7	4	1	2	0	7 (Note: Appearances in UEFA Women's Champions League)	1	—		33	9
Chelsea	2026–27	Women's Super League	11	1	0	0	—		7	0	—		18	1
Chelsea	Total		31	8	4	1	2	0	14	1	0	0	51	10
Career total			93	23	6	1	2	0	14	1	5	0	120	25

=== International ===
As of match played October 13, 2026

Appearances and goals by national team and year
National team	Year	Apps	Goals
United States	2022	2	0
United States	2023	7	0
United States	2024	4	1
United States	2025	13	2
United States	2026	8	1
Total		34	4

Scores and results list United States's goal tally first, score column indicates score after each Thompson goal.

List of international goals scored by Alyssa Thompson
No.	Date	Venue	Opponent	Score	Result	Competition	Ref.
1	October 24, 2024	Q2 Stadium, Austin, Texas, United States	Iceland	1–0	3–1	Friendly	
2	June 26, 2025	Dick's Sporting Goods Park, Commerce City, Colorado, United States	Republic of Ireland	4–0	4–0	Friendly	
3	June 29, 2025	TQL Stadium, Cincinnati, Ohio, United States	Republic of Ireland	4–0	4–0	Friendly	
4	March 7, 2026	Sports Illustrated Stadium, Harrison, New Jersey, United States	Colombia	1–0	1–0	2026 SheBelieves Cup	

== Honors and awards ==
Chelsea

- Women's League Cup: 2025–26

United States

- SheBelieves Cup: 2026

United States U20

- CONCACAF Women's U-20 Championship: 2022

Individual

- Gatorade National Soccer Player of the Year: 2021
- NWSL Rookie of the Month: March/April 2023
- NWSL Team of the Month: 2024: August, September
- SheBelieves Cup Most Valuable Player: 2026
