= Sarah Gorden =

American soccer player (born 1992)

- Gorden with Angel City in 2026

Personal information
- Full name: Sarah L. Gorden
- Date of birth: September 13, 1992 (age 34)
- Place of birth: Elk Grove Village, Illinois, U.S.
- Height: 5 ft 6 in (1.68 m)
- Position: Center back

Youth career
- Eclipse Select SC

College career
Years	Team	Apps	(Gls)
2011–2015	DePaul Blue Demons	77	(1)

Senior career*
Years	Team	Apps	(Gls)
2016–2021	Chicago Red Stars	76	(0)
2022–2026	Angel City	101	(0)
- * Club domestic league appearances and goals as of 06:00, November 12, 2026 (UTC)

Sarah L. Gorden (born September 13, 1992) is an American professional soccer player who plays as a center back. She played college soccer for the DePaul Blue Demons before being selected by the Chicago Red Stars in the 2016 NWSL College Draft. She later joined Angel City FC, where she served as captain and helped the club reach two playoff appearances. Gorden is a two-time NWSL Best XI selection, a three-time nominee for NWSL Defender of the Year, and a two-time NWSL iron woman.

== Early life ==
The adopted daughter of Jeff and Sue Gorden, Sarah Gorden began playing soccer at age four. When she began playing competitively, her speed on the pitch inspired her to join her high school track team. While attending James B. Conant High School, she played club soccer for Eclipse Select SC.

== College career ==
Gorden attended DePaul University from 2011 to 2015, following in the footsteps of her parents who were both student athletes at DePaul. Gorden majored in journalism and competed as a hurdler on the track team for her first two years of university in addition to playing soccer. She scored her first collegiate goal on September 11, 2011, against Minnesota.

Gorden did not compete in the 2013 season due to pregnancy. She returned to the Blue Demons in 2014 to lead the team's defense to a conference title and consecutive NCAA tournament appearances while allowing the fewest goals in the Big East Conference. In 2014, Gorden was named to the All-Big East second team. In 2014, Gorden also help set a school record with a 20-game undefeated streak that was tied with No. 1-ranked UCLA for longest in the nation. In 2015, Gorden was named Big East Defensive Player of the Week four times, and was named to the All-Big East first team.

== Club career ==
=== Chicago Red Stars, 2016–2021 ===
Gorden was drafted by Chicago Red Stars in the 3rd round, as the 22nd pick overall, during the 2016 NWSL College Draft. She became the first DePaul Women's Soccer player to be selected in the NWSL draft. She made her professional debut in the season opener against the Houston Dash, subbing in for Alyssa Mautz in the 83rd minute of play.

In January 2021, Gorden was signed to a two-year contract renewal with Chicago Red Stars. On October 29, 2021, Gorden became Chicago's first Iron Woman by playing every minute of the 2021 NWSL season. She came second in voting for NWSL Defender of the Year behind Caprice Dydasco.

=== Angel City FC, 2022–2026 ===
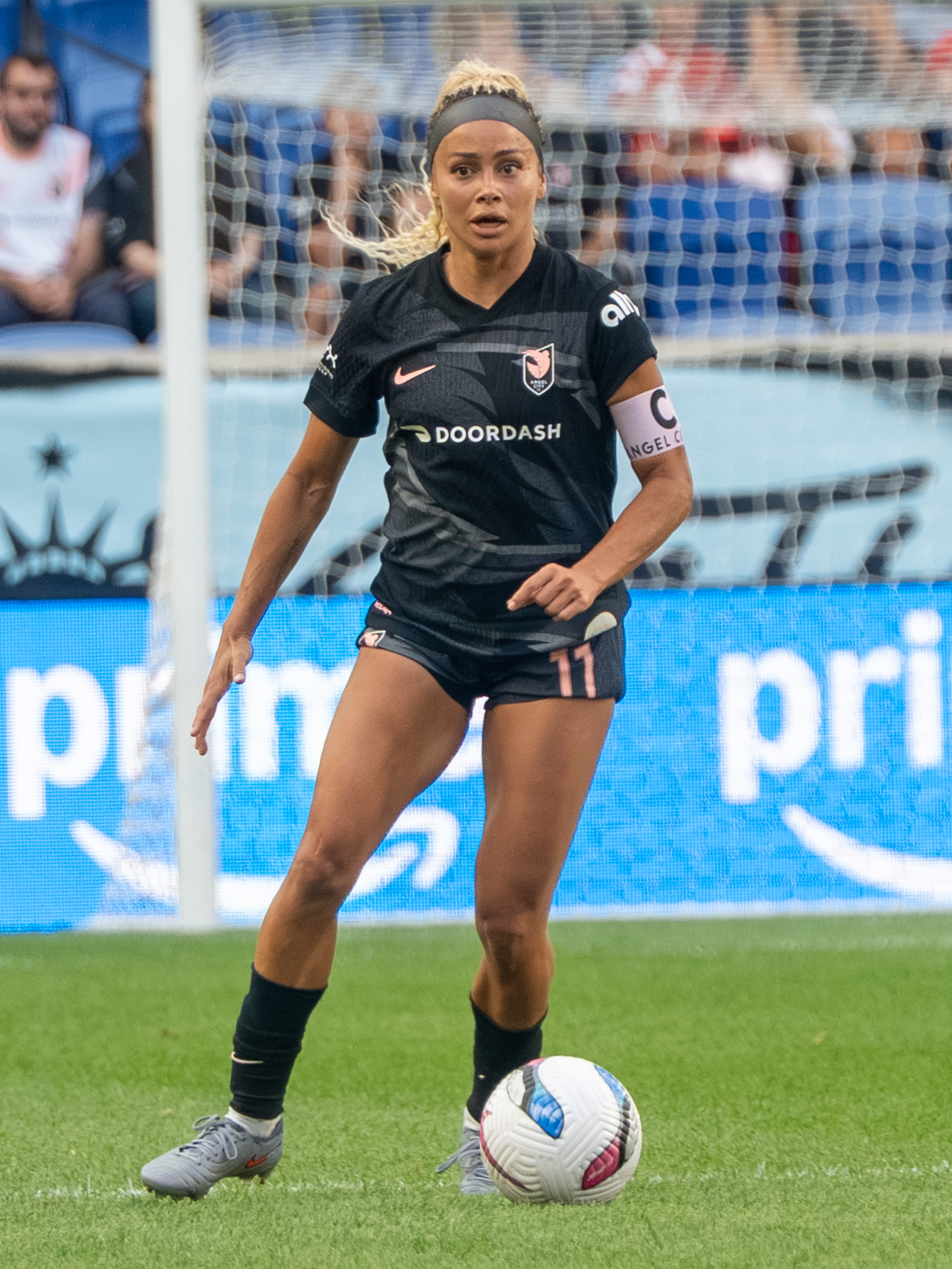
Gorden with Angel City FC in 2025

On December 3, 2021, Gorden's rights were traded to Angel City FC ahead of the upcoming expansion draft. After missing the entire 2022 season due to an ACL injury, Gorden went on to return and play every minute of the 2023 regular season, becoming an iron woman for the second time in her career in the team's run to their first playoff appearance. She was also named to the NWSL Best XI and nominated for Defender of the Year at the conclusion of the season. On December 19, 2023, it was announced that Gorden had signed a new contract with Angel City which would keep her at the club until 2026 with a mutual option for 2027.

Ahead of the 2024 season, Gorden was named as vice-captain of the team, and would end up regularly captaining Angel City matches after captain Ali Riley suffered a season-ending injury. On April 21, 2024, Gorden made her 100th NWSL regular-season appearance in Angel City's home match against North Carolina Courage which finished as a 2–1 victory. On August 9, 2024, Gorden was named to the July 2024 NWSL Team of the Month after recording four tackles won throughout the month and registering a passing accuracy of 79.34% in 360 minutes played. Gorden captained Angel City to the top of Group D and a spot in the NWSL x LIGA MX Femenil Semifinals in Kansas City, Missouri. Gorden was named to the NWSL's Team of the Month for a second consecutive month for August 2024, after helping her club record one clean sheet in August while registering a passing accuracy of 83.2% in 270 minutes played.

During the 2025 NWSL season, Gorden continued serving as Angel City’s captain and started all 26 regular-season matches, playing 2,273 minutes.

Gorden made her 150th NWSL regular-season appearance on May 2, 2026, against the Utah Royals. One week later, she recorded her first career NWSL assist, against rivals San Diego Wave FC. She was subsequently named to the NWSL Best XI of the Month for August 2026. Her efforts helped Angel City reach its second NWSL playoff appearance in club history after finishing fifth in the regular-season standings, recording a club-record 10 shutouts, and ending the regular season on a 10-match unbeaten streak. Gorden was also named a finalist for the 2026 NWSL Defender of the Year award, marking her third career nomination. By October 2026, Gorden had become Angel City’s all-time leader in appearances and matches captained. She was also the longest-tenured player on the club’s roster. On November 18, 2026, Gorden announced her departure from Angel City in a personal essay titled “A love letter to LA”, published on Substack. Reflecting on her time with the club, she wrote that she had initially expected to remain with Angel City until the end of her playing career, but indicated that not everyone within the organization wanted her to stay. Angel City confirmed Gorden's departure later that day.

== International career ==
Gorden received her first call-up to the United States women’s national soccer team in November 2019, when head coach Vlatko Andonovski selected her for a December 9–14 identification camp in Bradenton, Florida. The camp was organized to evaluate players for potential future national-team selections. Gorden was among ten players receiving their first senior national-team call-up.

In October 2020, Gorden was selected for her first full senior national-team training camp, held October 18–28 in Commerce City, Colorado. She was the only player on the 27-player roster who had never previously attended a U.S. youth national-team camp. Andonovski praised her one-on-one defending and ability to carry the ball forward to initiate attacks.

In a 2022 interview with Backheeled, Gorden reflected on her national-team camp experiences, saying they had helped her recognize the level of improvement necessary to earn consistent selection. While recovering from an ACL injury that year, she also expressed her ambition to return to national-team camps and earn her first international appearance.

== Personal life ==
Gorden gave birth to her son, Caiden, in 2014 while attending DePaul University, where she was a Division I soccer player. She raised him as a single mother while completing college and beginning her professional soccer career. Gorden has discussed the challenges of balancing parenthood with professional athletics, including relying on support from her parents and friends for childcare while attending classes and traveling for matches.

During her rookie season with the Chicago Red Stars in 2016, Gorden earned $8,000 and relied on government assistance and support from family and friends to meet living expenses. In a May 2026 interview with the Los Angeles Times, she reflected on the financial difficulties and lack of childcare resources available to mothers during the early years of the National Women’s Soccer League. She has since spoken positively about improvements in the league’s maternity protections and childcare benefits, particularly those provided by Angel City FC.

Gorden has incorporated meditation and mindfulness into her personal routine since the beginning of her professional career. She has described teaching herself meditation during her rookie season to manage anxiety and the pressures of professional soccer. In interviews, she has credited the practice with helping her manage stress and maintain emotional balance.

In September 2020, Gorden founded HoodSpace, a nonprofit organization in Chicago focused on making yoga, meditation, and mindfulness practices accessible to girls of color and underserved communities. She has said that the mental health challenges of the COVID-19 pandemic motivated her to establish the organization. HoodSpace has also participated in community events, including a 2026 soccer clinic organized by Gorden, where it provided yoga and meditation activities for participants.

== Career statistics ==
=== Club ===
As of November 7, 2026

Appearances and goals by club, season and competition
Club	Season	League			Cup (Note: Includes the NWSL Challenge Cup & NWSL Fall Series.)		Playoffs (Note: Includes NWSL Playoffs.)		Other		Total	
Club	Season	Division	Apps	Goals	Apps	Goals	Apps	Goals	Apps	Goals	Apps	Goals
Chicago Red Stars	2016	NWSL	4	0	–		–		–		4	0
Chicago Red Stars	2017	NWSL	5	0	–		–		–		5	0
Chicago Red Stars	2018	NWSL	17	0	–		–		–		17	0
Chicago Red Stars	2019	NWSL	23	0	–		2	0	–		25	0
Chicago Red Stars	2020	NWSL	0	0	9	0	–		–		9	0
Chicago Red Stars	2021	NWSL	24	0	4	0	3	0	–		31	0
Chicago Red Stars	Total		73	0	13	0	5	0	–		91	0
Angel City FC	2022	NWSL	0	0	0	0	–		–		0	0
Angel City FC	2023	NWSL	22	0	5	0	1	0	1	0	29	0
Angel City FC	2024	NWSL	24	0	4	0	–		1	0	29	0
Angel City FC	2025	NWSL	26	0	–		–		4	0	30	0
Angel City FC	2026	NWSL	29	0	–		1	0	–		30	0
Angel City FC	Total		101	0	9	0	2	0	6	0	118	0
Career total			174	0	22	0	7	0	6	0	209	0

== Honors ==
Individual

- NWSL Best XI: 2021, 2023
- NWSL Best XI Second Team: 2026
- NWSL Team of the Month: 2019: July 2021: October 2023: July, September/October 2024: July, August
- NWSL Best XI of the Month: 2026: August, September
