= Madison Hammond =

American soccer player (born 1997)

- Hammond with the Utah Royals in 2026

Personal information
- Full name: Madison Guadalupe Hammond
- Date of birth: November 15, 1997 (age 29)
- Place of birth: Phoenix, Arizona, U.S.
- Height: 5 ft 8 in (1.73 m)
- Position: Defensive midfielder

Team information
- Current team: Utah Royals
- Number: 99

Youth career
- 2006–2012: Prince William Soccer
- 2013–2016: McLean Youth Soccer

College career
Years	Team	Apps	(Gls)
2016–2019	Wake Forest Demon Deacons	75	(4)

Senior career*
Years	Team	Apps	(Gls)
2020–2021	OL Reign	13	(0)
2022–2025	Angel City	72	(1)
2026–	Utah Royals	19	(0)
- * Club domestic league appearances and goals as of 04:20, November 10, 2026 (UTC)

Madison Guadalupe Hammond (born November 15, 1997) is an American professional soccer player who plays as a defensive midfielder for the Utah Royals of the National Women's Soccer League (NWSL). She played college soccer for the Wake Forest Demon Deacons before playing professionally for the OL Reign and Angel City FC.

== Early life ==
Hammond was born in Phoenix, Arizona, but raised in the San Felipe Pueblo north of Albuquerque, New Mexico. Hammond's single mother Carol Lincoln is Navajo and San Felipe Pueblo, and raised Hammond. Her father is Black. She is named Shrewaka in the Keres language. She first played soccer in Albuquerque as the only girl on a boys' team at age 5. She spent time during her childhood on the San Felipe Pueblo reservation, where she is a member of the tribe's fox clan.

Hammond's mother was in the military and moved with her when Lincoln was reassigned to Washington, D.C. when Hammond was 9 years old. She joined girls' soccer club Prince William Soccer near her mother's base when they moved to Virginia; attended Hayfield Secondary School in Alexandria, Virginia, where she played varsity volleyball; and joined youth club McLean Youth Soccer of the Elite Clubs National League during her sophomore year. Prior to college, Hammond played as an attacking midfielder before transitioning to defense.

== College career ==
Hammond was a four-year starter at Wake Forest University, and team captain for two years. During her senior year, she was named second-team All-ACC and was All-ACC academic all four years. She was also a member of the National Honor Society and honor societies in Spanish, science, and history. Hammond plays the violin and was a member of the Wake Forest orchestra. She completed her coursework a semester early to prepare for the 2020 NWSL College Draft.

== Club career ==
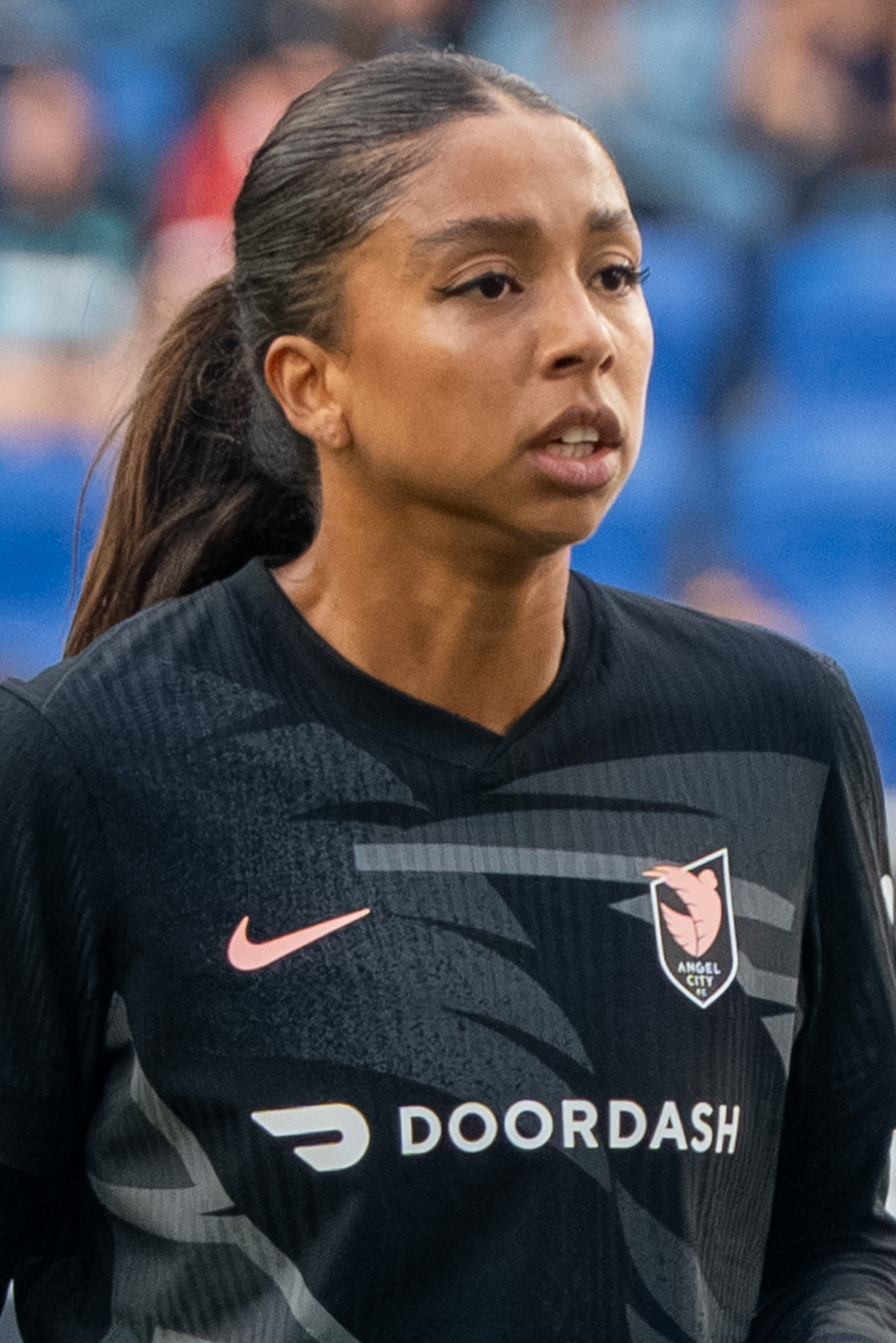
Hammond with Angel City in 2025

Hammond registered for the 2020 NWSL College Draft but was not selected. She attended tryouts for clubs in Seville and Madrid, Spain, during the draft.

=== OL Reign ===
After the 2020 Draft, OL Reign of the NWSL acquired Hammond's playing rights and invited her to preseason camp. However, due to the impact of the COVID-19 pandemic on sports, training was suspended in March 2020 and Hammond was sent home. She re-joined the Reign at a new camp in Missoula, Montana, as a non-roster invitee ahead of the 2020 NWSL Challenge Cup, and signed a professional contract with the team three weeks later. She made her NWSL debut on September 26, 2020.

Hammond's appearance made her the first Native American player to play in the NWSL, being Navajo and Pueblo. When she was informed of the milestone during a post-match interview with the Men in Blazers podcast, Hammond was in disbelief and asked for confirmation.

=== Angel City FC ===
On March 11, 2022, OL Reign traded Hammond to Angel City FC in exchange for a second-round pick in the 2023 NWSL Draft and $45,000 in allocation money. She played 319 minutes across nine games, earning three starts, in her first season with Angel City.

During a May 7, 2023, match against Kansas City Current, Hammond filled in for Julie Ertz at defensive midfield against 2022 NWSL Best XI attackers Debinha and Lo'eau LaBonta, and in addition to effectively marking both players, Hammond was credited with the assist on Angel City's match-winning goal. On August 27, 2023, Hammond scored her first NWSL goal, a match winner against her former club, OL Reign. Upon the expiration of her contract at the end of 2025, Hammond departed from Angel City. She had made 72 regular season appearances for the club up to that point.

=== Utah Royals ===
On December 2, 2025, the Utah Royals signed Hammond to a two-year contract through 2027.

== Style of play ==
Hammond is a flexible defender with experience at all backline positions as well as defensive midfield. Teammates, coaches, and analysts have praised her calmness and composure in defense. Hammond is also an ambidextrous passer.

== Work outside of soccer ==
Hammond designed the Kyrie Low 4 sneaker for Nike Inc. The shoe's namesake, Kyrie Irving, is of Standing Rock Sioux heritage.

Hammond walked the red carpet at the 2022 ESPY Awards, where she was the first Afro-Indigenous athlete to attend.

== Personal life ==
Being both Native American and African American, she has been very active in social justice for both communities while at Wake Forest and as a professional. She is a member of the Black Women's Players Collective, Athlete Ally, and the Nike N7 Fund initiative to support Native American communities. Hammond also advocates for women's and girls' soccer players to receive similar benefits as men's and boy's athletes, including less expensive soccer academy access and higher pay for professional players. She also spoke with NWSL player McCall Zerboni about the use of a phrase demeaning to Native Americans during a post-match interview.

Hammond's sister Michaela played volleyball for New York University. Hammond's uncle Notah Begay III, a PGA Tour golfer who played with Tiger Woods, was an athletic inspiration.

Hammond returns to San Felipe Pueblo annually for its feast day on May 1.

== Career statistics ==
=== Club ===
As of September 18, 2025

Appearances and goals by club, season and competition
Club	Season	League			Cup (Note: Includes the NWSL Challenge Cup)		Playoffs (Note: Includes NWSL Playoffs.)		Other		Total	
Club	Season	Division	Apps	Goals	Apps	Goals	Apps	Goals	Apps	Goals	Apps	Goals
OL Reign	2020	NWSL	— (Note: he 2020 NWSL regular season and playoffs were canceled due to the COVID-19 pandemic.)		0	0	—		4 (Note: Includes NWSL Fall Series)	0	4	0
OL Reign	2021	NWSL	13	0	4	0	—		—		17	0
OL Reign	Total		13	0	4	0	—		4	0	21	0
Angel City FC	2022	NWSL	9	0	6	0	—		—		15	0
Angel City FC	2023	NWSL	19	1	6	1	1	0	—		26	2
Angel City FC	2024	NWSL	23	0	—		—		4 (Note: Includes NWSL x Liga MX Femenil Summer Cup)	0	27	0
Angel City FC	2025	NWSL	20	0	—		—		2	0	22	0
Angel City FC	Total		71	1	12	1	1	0	4	0	90	2
Career total			83	1	16	1	1	0	8	0	111	2
