= Clarisse Le Bihan =

French footballer (born 1994)

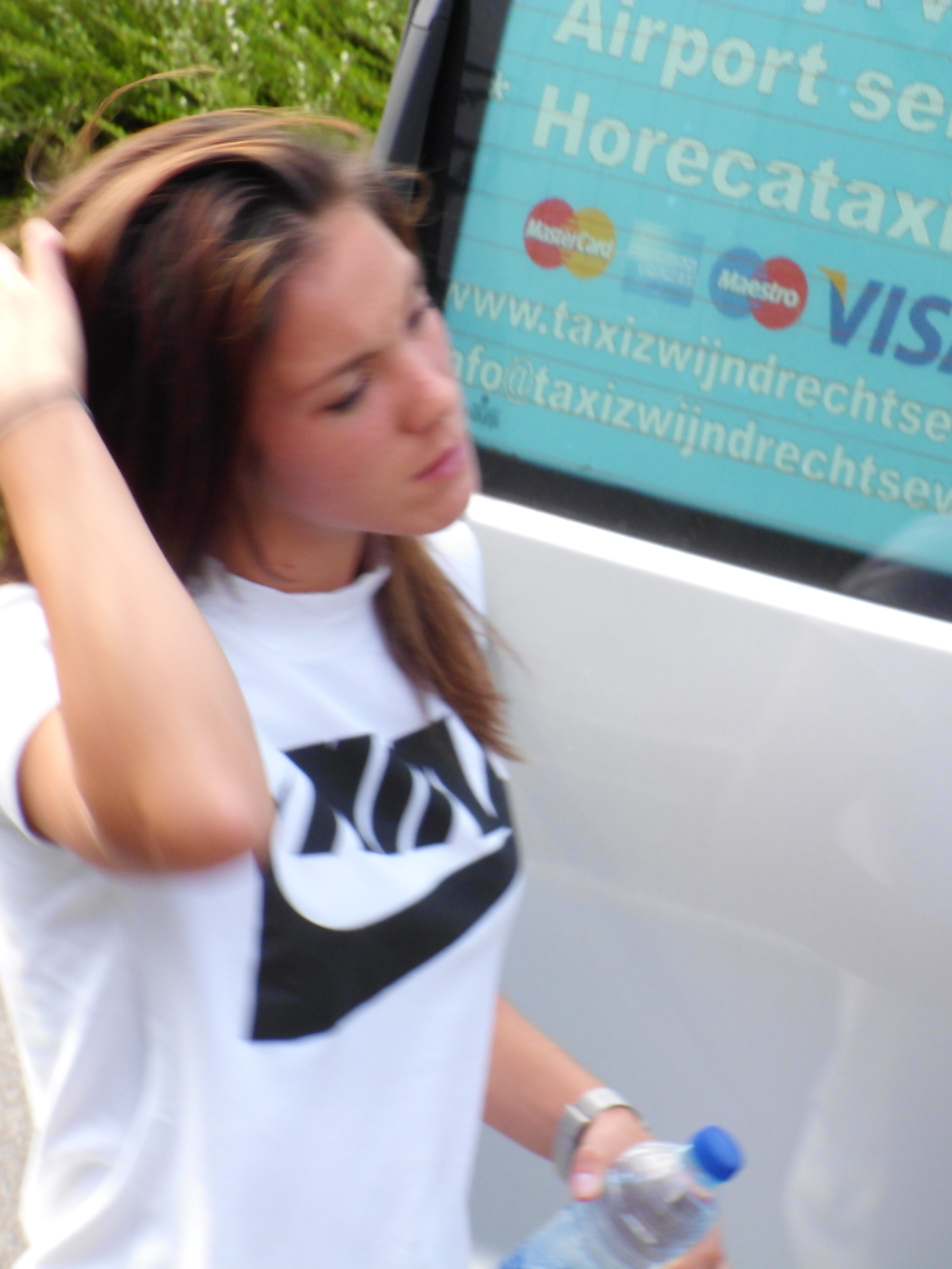
- Le Bihan in 2017

Personal information
- Full name: Clarisse Agathe Le Bihan
- Date of birth: 14 December 1994 (age 31)
- Place of birth: Quimperlé, France
- Height: 1.72 m (5 ft 8 in)
- Position: Midfielder

Team information
- Current team: Inter Milan
- Number: 11

Youth career
- 2000–2007: US Quimperloise
- 2007–2008: PD Ergué-Gabéric
- 2008–2009: Quimper CFC
- 2009–2012: Guingamp

Senior career*
Years	Team	Apps	(Gls)
2009–2016	Guingamp	107	(14)
2016–2022	Montpellier	101	(27)
2022–2024	Angel City	47	(2)
2024–2026	Lazio	40	(15)
2026–	Inter Milan	0	(0)

International career
2010	France U16	2	(0)
2009–2011	France U17	17	(7)
2012–2013	France U19	18	(4)
2014	France U20	7	(2)
2015–2017	France U23	8	(1)
2015–2017	France	16	(4)
- * Club domestic league appearances and goals as of 1 October 2026

Clarisse Agathe Le Bihan (born 14 December 1994) is a French professional footballer who plays as a midfielder for Inter Milan in Serie A. She previously played for Montpellier and Guingamp in France's Division 1 Féminine as well as Angel City FC in the United States' National Women's Soccer League. She has represented France on the senior, under-19, and under-17 national teams.

== Club career ==
=== Angel City, 2022–2024 ===
Le Bihan signed with Angel City FC in the American National Women's Soccer League (NWSL) in April 2022 for the club's inaugural season. She started in 10 of the 20 matches she played in 1,098 minutes on the pitch. The club finished their first season in eighth place with a 8–9–5 record.

During the 2023 season, Le Bihan scored the team's first goal in their 2–1 win against OL Reign on August 27. She was a starting midfielder in 7 of the 17 matches she played. Angel City finished in fifth place during the regular season and advanced to the playoffs for the first time where they were eliminated by Seattle Reign FC in the quarter final match.

Le s signed a new contract with Angel City FC in January 2024 ahead of the 2024 season. Le Bihan started her first match of the 2024 season on May 12, 2024, in a 0–1 home loss against Houston Dash.

On July 15, 2024, Le Bihan and Angel City mutually parted ways. Le Bihan finished her time with Angel City with 55 appearances across all competitions, 47 in the NWSL regular season.

=== Lazio, 2024–2026 ===
On July 24, 2024, Serie A Femminile team Lazio announced the signing of Le Bihan via social media. Le Bihan scored in her first regular season appearance for Lazio on 30 August 2024, in a home match against AS Roma which ended as a 2–2 draw.

== Career statistics ==
=== International ===
As of match played 30 July 2017

Appearances and goals by national team and year
National team	Year	Apps	Goals
France	2015	7	3
France	2016	5	1
France	2017	4	0
Total		16	4

Scores and results list France's goal tally first. Score column indicates score after each Le Bihan goal.

International goals by date, venue, opponent, score, result and competition
No.	Date	Venue	Opponent	Score	Result	Competition
1.	27 November 2015	Qemal Stafa Stadium, Tirana, Albania	Albania	4–0	6–0	2017 UEFA Women's Euro qualification
2.	27 November 2015	Qemal Stafa Stadium, Tirana, Albania	Albania	5–0	6–0	2017 UEFA Women's Euro qualification
3.	1 December 2015	Katerini Stadium, Katerini, Greece	Greece	2–0	3–0	2017 UEFA Women's Euro qualification
4.	20 September 2016	Stade Sébastien Charléty, Paris, France	Albania	1–0	6–0	2017 UEFA Women's Euro qualification

== Honours ==
France U19

- UEFA Women's Under-19 Championship: 2013
