= 2026 SheBelieves Cup =

Tournament details
- Host country: United States
- Dates: March 1–7
- Teams: 4 (from 2 confederations)
- Venues: 3 (in 3 host cities)

Final positions
- Champions: United States (8th title)
- Runners-up: Canada
- Third place: Colombia
- Fourth place: Argentina

Tournament statistics
- Matches played: 6
- Goals scored: 10 (1.67 per match)
- Attendance: 116,110 (19,352 per match)
- Top scorer: Ten players (1 goal each)
- Best player: (United States) Alyssa Thompson

The 2026 SheBelieves Cup, named the 2026 SheBelieves Cup Presented by Visa for sponsorship reasons, was the 11th edition of the SheBelieves Cup, an invitational women's soccer tournament held in the United States. Featuring national teams from Argentina, Canada, Colombia, and the United States, the tournament was held from March 1 to 7, 2026. The United States won the tournament with a record of 3 wins and no losses; the Most Valuable Player award was conferred on Alyssa Thompson of the United States.

Argentina and Colombia made their second appearances in the SheBelieves Cup, while Canada made their fourth appearance.

The final match featured a pre-game ceremony celebrating long-time United States player Tobin Heath in her home state of New Jersey.

== Format ==
This edition was once again a six-game, three-match-day format. There were two matches on each day. The teams pairings followed a round-robin format. Three points were awarded for a win at the end of regulation. All matches ending in a draw resulted in a penalty shootout where the winner was awarded two points and the loser was awarded one point.

== Venues ==
Nashville, Tennessee	Columbus, Ohio	Harrison, New Jersey
Geodis Park	ScottsMiracle-Gro Field	Sports Illustrated Stadium
Capacity: 30,109	Capacity: 20,371	Capacity: 25,000
2026 SheBelieves Cup is located in the United States

== Teams ==
Team	FIFA Ranking (December 2025)
United States	2
Canada	10
Colombia	20
Argentina	30

== Standings ==
Pos	Team	Pld	W	PW	PL	L	GF	GA	GD	Pts
1st place, gold medalist(s)	United States (C, H)	3	3	0	0	0	4	0	+4	9
2nd place, silver medalist(s)	Canada	3	1	1	0	1	4	2	+2	5
3rd place, bronze medalist(s)	Colombia	3	1	0	0	2	2	5	−3	3
4	Argentina	3	0	0	1	2	0	3	−3	1

Source: ESPN
Rules for classification: 1) points; 2) goal difference; 3) goals scored; 4) head-to-head result; 5) fair play ranking.
(C) Champion; (H) Host

== Results ==
March 1
13:00 CST

Canada	4–1	Colombia
Gilles 31'; Sonis 67'; Collins 73'; Prince 90'	Report	Santos 81' (pen.)

Geodis Park, Nashville, Tennessee
Attendance: 17,125
Referee: Katja Koroleva (United States)
March 1
16:00 CST

United States	2–0	Argentina
Heaps 20'; Shaw 56'	Report

Geodis Park, Nashville, Tennessee
Attendance: 17,125
Referee: Timothy Derry (Trinidad and Tobago)

March 4
15:30 EST

Argentina	0–1	Colombia
	Report	Caicedo 64'

ScottsMiracle-Gro Field, Columbus, Ohio
Attendance: 18,545
Referee: Natalie Simon (United States)
March 4
18:45 EST

United States	1–0	Canada
Sentnor 55'	Report

ScottsMiracle-Gro Field, Columbus, Ohio
Attendance: 18,545
Referee: Lizzet Garcia (Mexico)

March 7
12:30 EST

Canada	0–0	Argentina
	Report
Penalties
Huitema (penalty missed); Fleming (penalty scored); Sonis (penalty scored); Grosso (penalty scored)	3–2	(penalty missed) Cometti; (penalty missed) Braun; (penalty scored) Holzeier; (penalty scored) Vargas; (penalty missed) Preininger

Sports Illustrated Stadium, Harrison, New Jersey
Attendance: 22,385
Referee: Alyssa Pennington (United States)
March 7
15:30 EST

United States	1–0	Colombia
A. Thompson 82'	Report

Sports Illustrated Stadium, Harrison, New Jersey
Attendance: 22,385
Referee: Vimarest Diaz (Dominican Republic)

== Goalscorers ==
There were 10 goals scored in 6 matches, for an average of 1.67 goals per match.

1 goal

- (Canada) Sydney Collins
- (Canada) Vanessa Gilles
- (Canada) Nichelle Prince
- (Canada) Janine Sonis
- (Colombia) Linda Caicedo
- (Colombia) Leicy Santos
- (United States) Lindsey Heaps
- (United States) Ally Sentnor
- (United States) Jaedyn Shaw
- (United States) Alyssa Thompson

Source: Soccerway

Following the final match, the Most Valuable Player award, called the Visa SheBelieves Cup MVP for sponsorship reasons, was awarded to Alyssa Thompson of the United States.
