= 2026 Angel City FC season =

Angel City FC
2026 season
- Owners: List of Angel City FC owners
- Sporting director: Mark Parsons
- Head coach: Alexander Straus (until June 17); Leif Gunnar Smerud (interim; from June 17)
- Stadium: BMO Stadium (capacity: 22,000)
- League: 5th
- Playoffs: Quarterfinals
- Top goalscorer: Sveindís Jane Jónsdóttir (10)
- Highest home attendance: 20,548 (vs BAY, Oct 24)
- Lowest home attendance: 11,574 (vs KC, May 20)
- Average home league attendance: 15,851
- Biggest win: 4–0 v CHI (Home, Mar 15, NWSL)
- Biggest defeat: 0–2 v NC (Home, Aug 26, NWSL)
Home colors	Away colors
- All statistics correct as of November 7, 2026.

The 2026 Angel City FC season was the team's fifth season as a professional women's soccer team. Angel City FC played in the National Women's Soccer League (NWSL), the top tier of women's soccer in the United States. They played their home matches at BMO Stadium in Los Angeles, California.

== Background ==
Angel City finished the 2025 National Women's Soccer League season in 11th place out of 14 teams, 9 points behind Gotham FC for the lowest NWSL playoffs qualification position.

=== Notable transactions ===
The club's roster underwent several changes late in the 2025 season, including the retirements of striker Christen Press and defender Ali Riley, and the September 2025 sale of winger Alyssa Thompson to Chelsea F.C. for a then-record $1.65 million total transfer fee. Other late-season transactions included the September trade of defender M.A. Vignola for Japanese midfielder Hina Sugita from Portland Thorns FC, and the acquisition of midfielder Nealy Martin from Gotham FC for an $85,000 transfer fee.

On January 9, 2026, Angel City acquired Emily Sams, 2024's NWSL Defender of the Year, from the Orlando Pride for a $650,000 transfer fee.

On June 17, Angel City traded midfielder Kennedy Fuller and a 2026 international roster spot to Bay FC for a total of $520,000 in transfer fees.

On June 19, Angel City acquired forward Ally Sentnor from the Kansas City Current for a $850,000 transfer fee.

== Summary ==
After winning its first three matches against Chicago Stars FC, Bay FC, and Houston Dash by a combined 9-2, Angel City FC lost six of their next eight. The club subsequently fired manager Alexander Straus on June 18 with the club in 11th place, and replaced him in the interim with recently hired senior assistant coach Leif Gunnar Smerud. Angel City proceeded to lose only 2 of their subsequent 19 matches in going 11–6–2 with a +21 goal differential, including a 10-match unbeaten streak that was the league's longest of the season.

Angel City finished its regular season in 5th place out of 16 teams with a total record of 15–7–8. The club set franchise bests in total wins (15), goals scored per match (1.8), and goals allowed per match (1.07), and also led the league in goal differential with +22.

The club clinched its second-ever NWSL playoffs berth on October 24 after Portland Thorns FC defeated the North Carolina Courage 1–0. After finishing the season with a 4–1 win over Boston Legacy FC, Angel City drew 4th-seeded Kansas City Current for the opening round of the playoffs.

== Stadium and facilities ==
Angel City continued to play in BMO Stadium, their home since the team's inaugural season in 2022. Their final home match on November 1 was moved to Dignity Health Sports Park in Carson, California, due to a scheduling conflict with Los Angeles FC.

== Staff ==
On May 1, 2026, Angel City announced the hiring of SK Brann manager Leif Gunnar Smerud as a senior assistant coach. Smerud had previously managed Crystal Palace W.F.C. and the Norway national under-21 football team, and at the time of his hiring was the reigning Toppserien coach of the year.

On June 18, Angel City fired manager Alexander Straus after just more than a year in the role, and replaced him in the interim with Smerud. Straus compiled a record of 11–7–19 during his tenure.

On July 16, Angel City announced the hiring assistant coach Mariana Cabral and goalkeeping coach Louis Hunt. Cabral had previously been an assistant coach for Chicago Stars FC and Utah Royals, and manager of Sporting CP in Portugal. Hunt was previously an assistant coach for San Diego State Aztecs women's soccer, a goalkeeping coach for the United States women's national under-23 soccer team, and head of goalkeeping for San Diego Wave FC.

=== Current staff ===
As of July 8, 2026.

Executive
CEO	Amy Taylor
President of business operations	Carmen Bona
Co-founder/principal advisor	Julie Uhrman
Sporting director	Mark Parsons
Assistant general manager	Matt Wade
Coaching
Head coach (interim)	Leif Smerud
Senior assistant coach	Sam Laity
Senior assistant coach	Eleri Earnshaw
Head of goalkeeping	Louis Hunt
Technical assistant coach	Cassidy Chriest
Performance analyst	Oliver Blitz
Performance analyst	Yuma Moriya
Technical staff
Director of soccer operations	Liz Lagasse
Soccer operations manager	Larissa Campelo
Player care manager	Brittany Hong
Head of recruitment	Tony Vigil
Operations and facilities manager	Max Oken
Head equipment manager	Brock Chartier
Director of performance	Kirsty Hicks
Physical performance coach	Jillian Zeller
Performance rehab coach	Alessandro Ciarla
Director of rehabilitation	Aisling Toolan
Director of medical	Hollie Walusz
Head athletic trainer	Matt Brandt
Assistant athletic trainer	Jake Devries
Physical therapist	Brooke Milliet

== Players ==
=== Current squad ===
As of November 5, 2026.

No.	Pos.	Nation	Player
2	FW	USA	Sydney Leroux
3	DF	USA	Savy King
4	DF	USA	Karsyn Cherry
6	DF	USA	Emily Sams
7	MF	JPN	Hina Sugita (SEI)
8	MF	BRA	Ary Borges
10	FW	SCO	Claire Emslie
11	DF	USA	Sarah Gorden (captain)
12	MF	BRA	Maiara Niehues
13	GK	USA	Hannah Seabert
14	MF	USA	Nealy Martin
15	DF	USA	Evelyn Shores
16	MF	USA	Carina Lageyre
17	MF	USA	Ally Sentnor
18	FW	JPN	Jun Endo (SEI)
19	GK	USA	Angelina Anderson
20	DF	USA	Gisele Thompson
24	FW	ZAM	Prisca Chilufya
25	DF	USA	Sophia Mattice
28	FW	USA	Maddie DiMaria
30	GK	USA	Faith Nguyen
32	FW	ISL	Sveindís Jane Jónsdóttir
33	FW	USA	Riley Tiernan
40	MF	USA	Jennie Immethun
99	FW	USA	Taylor Suarez

==== Out on loan ====
No.	Pos.	Nation	Player
27	FW	COL	Maithé López (on loan to Vancouver Rise FC)

== Competitions ==
Win Draw Loss

=== Preseason ===
==== Coachella Valley Invitational ====
February 15, 2026 1	Portland Thorns FC	–	Angel City FC	Indio, California
1:00 p.m. PDT (UTC-7)				Stadium: Empire Polo Club

February 21, 2026 2	Angel City FC	–	Seattle Reign FC	Indio, California
1:30 p.m. PDT (UTC-7)				Stadium: Empire Polo Club

=== Regular season ===
All matches are in Pacific

==== Regular season standings ====
Pos	Team	Pld	W	D	L	GF	GA	GD	Pts	Qualification
3	Washington Spirit	30	17	4	9	43	28	+15	55	Playoffs
4	Kansas City Current	30	16	5	9	54	39	+15	53	Playoffs
5	Angel City FC	30	15	7	8	54	32	+22	52	Playoffs
6	Portland Thorns FC	30	14	8	8	50	41	+9	50	Playoffs
7	Utah Royals	30	14	5	11	44	39	+5	47	Playoffs

Source: NWSL
Rules for classification: 1) points; 2) total goal difference; 3) total wins; 4) total goals scored; 5) head-to-head points; 6) head-to-head goal goals scored; 7) fewest disciplinary points; 8) coin toss (if 2 clubs tied) or drawing of lots (if ≥3 clubs tied).

==== Results summary ====
Overall								Home						Away					
Pld	W	D	L	GF	GA	GD	Pts	W	D	L	GF	GA	GD	W	D	L	GF	GA	GD
30	15	7	8	54	32	+22	52	7	3	5	27	17	+10	8	4	3	27	15	+12

Last updated: November 1, 2026.
Source: NWSLsoccer.com

==== Results by matchday ====
Matchday	1	2	3	4	5	6	7	8	9	10	11	12	13	14	15	16	17	18	19	20	21	22	23	24	25	26	27	28	29	30
Ground	H	A	H	A	H	H	H	A	H	A	H	H	A	A	H	A	A	H	H	A	A	A	H	H	A	A	A	A	H	H
Result	W	W	W	L	L	L	L	D	W	L	L	W	W	W	L	D	D	D	D	L	W	W	D	W	W	W	D	W	W	W
Position	1	1	1	4	8	8	11	12	7	11	11	9	9	7	8	8	8	9	9	10	9	9	9	9	8	6	6	5	5	5

Updated to match(es) played on November 1, 2026. Source: NWSLsoccer.com
A = Away; H = Home; W = Win; D = Draw; L = Loss; P = Postponed; = NWSL Shield; = NWSL Playoffs

==== Matches ====
===== March =====
March 15, 2026 1	Angel City FC	4–0	Chicago Stars FC	Los Angeles, California
4:00 p.m. PDT (UTC-7)	Fuller 33'; Shores 53'; Ary Borges 66'; Niehues 70'	Report	Franklin (yellow card) 39'	Stadium: BMO Stadium; Attendance: 16,813; Referee: Shawn Tehini

March 21, 2026 2	Bay FC	1–3	Angel City FC	San Jose, California
5:45 p.m. PDT (UTC-7)	Moreau (yellow card) 27'; Huff 56', (yellow card) 90+5' (yellow-red card) 90+7'; Collins (yellow card) 90+2'	Report	Jónsdóttir 3', 53', (yellow card) 33'; Thompson 32'; Gorden (yellow card) 83'	Stadium: PayPal Park; Attendance: 10,299; Referee: Jaclyn Metz

March 27, 2026 3	Angel City FC	2–1	Houston Dash	Los Angeles, California
7:00 p.m. PDT (UTC-7)	Shores (yellow card) 14'; Jónsdóttir 47', (yellow card) 69'; Tiernan 49'	Report	Graham 10'; Colaprico (yellow card) 25'; Van Zanten (yellow card) 88'	Stadium: BMO Stadium; Attendance: 13,896; Referee: Mark Verso

===== April =====
April 3, 2026 4	Orlando Pride	2–1	Angel City FC	Orlando, Florida
5:00 p.m. PDT (UTC-7)	Angelina (yellow card) 63'; Banda (yellow card) 65'; McCutcheon 84', 90+8'; Dyke (yellow card) 89'; Rafaelle Souza (yellow card) 90+1'	Report	King (yellow card) 21'; Thompson 90+2'	Stadium: Inter&Co Stadium; Attendance: 8,040; Referee: Jeremy Scheer

April 26, 2026 5	Angel City FC	1–2	Portland Thorns FC	Los Angeles, California
3:00 p.m. PDT (UTC-7)	Chilufya 90+8'	Report	Tordin (yellow card) 39', (goal) 76'; Calzada (yellow card) 65'; Wilson 90+5'	Attendance: 16,636; Referee: Katja Koroleva

===== May =====
May 2, 2026 6	Angel City FC	0–1	Utah Royals	Los Angeles, California
5:45 p.m. PDT (UTC-7)	Niehues (red card) 45+6'; Ary Borges (yellow card) 90+3'; Shores (yellow card) 90+9'	Report	Lacasse 32', (yellow card) 45+6'; Tejada (yellow card) 57'; Pierre-Louis (yellow card) 79'	Stadium: BMO Stadium; Attendance: 15,183; Referee: Lauren Aldrich

May 9, 2026 7	Angel City FC	1–2	San Diego Wave FC	Los Angeles, California
5:45 p.m. PDT (UTC-7)	Gorden (yellow card) 32'; Sams 54'	Report	Dudinha 49'; Van Zanten 81'	Stadium: BMO Stadium; Attendance: 17,169; Referee: Abdou Ndiaye

May 17, 2026 8	Portland Thorns	0–0	Angel City FC	Portland, Oregon
3:00 p.m. PDT (UTC-7)		Report	Martin (yellow card) 11'; Sams (yellow card) 82'	Stadium: Providence Park; Attendance: 20,652; Referee: Alex Billeter

May 20, 2026 9	Angel City FC	2–1	Kansas City Current	Los Angeles, California
7:00 p.m. PDT (UTC-7)	Thompson 9'; Phair (yellow card) 65'; Fuller 71'; Martin (yellow card) 85'	Report	Sentnor 45'; LaBonta (penalty missed) 57'	Stadium: BMO Stadium; Attendance: 11,574; Referee: Jeremy Scheer

May 23, 2026 10	Houston Dash	2–1	Angel City FC	Houston, Texas
5:45 p.m. PDT (UTC-7)	Hardin (yellow card) 10'; Rader 17'; Klenke (yellow card) 25'; Graham (yellow card) 31', (goal) 90+1'; Patterson (yellow card) 74'	Report	Niehues 26' (pen.); Sams (yellow card) 28'; Phair (yellow card) 77'	Stadium: Shell Energy Stadium; Attendance: 6,207; Referee: Muhammad Kaleia

May 31, 2026 11	Angel City FC	1–2	North Carolina Courage	Los Angeles, California
4:00 p.m. PDT (UTC-7)	Niehues 51'	Report	Shiragaki (yellow card) 3'; Ijeh 48'; Matsukubo 79'	Stadium: BMO Stadium; Attendance: 16,057; Referee: Muhammad Hassan

===== July =====
July 3, 2026 12	Angel City FC	2–0	Orlando Pride	Los Angeles, California
7:00 p.m. PDT (UTC-7)	Niehues 36'; Jónsdóttir 56'	Report	Marta (yellow card) 68'	Stadium: BMO Stadium; Attendance: 13,900; Referee: Mark Verso

July 11, 2026 13	San Diego Wave FC	0–2	Angel City FC	San Diego, California
5:45 p.m. PDT (UTC-7)	Corley (yellow card) 5'; Morroni (yellow card) 18'; Godfrey (penalty missed) 86'	Report	Niehues 17'; Ary Borges 26'; Jónsdóttir (yellow card) 44'; Shores (yellow card) 81'	Stadium: Snapdragon Stadium; Attendance: 15,881; Referee: Ekaterina Koroleva

July 18, 2026 14	Chicago Stars	0–2	Angel City FC	Evanston, Illinois
3:30 p.m. PDT (UTC-7)	Alozie (yellow card) 45+6'; Farmer (yellow card) 82'	Report	Niehues 56' (pen.); Jónsdóttir 90+8'	Stadium: Martin Stadium; Attendance: 6,678; Referee: Rodrigo Albuquerque

July 26, 2026 15	Angel City FC	1–2	Racing Louisville FC	Los Angeles, California
6:00 p.m. PDT (UTC-7)	Sams (yellow card) 36'; Jónsdóttir 80'	Report	Lardner 24', 55', (yellow card) 45+3'; Hill (yellow card) 90+3'	Stadium: BMO Stadium; Attendance: 15,908; Referee: Laura Rodriguez

===== August =====
August 1, 2026 16	Kansas City Current	1–1	Angel City FC	Kansas City, Missouri
3:30 p.m. PDT (UTC-7)	Hopkins (yellow card) 7', (goal) 26'; Scott (yellow card) 90+4'		Suarez 14'; Emslie (yellow card) 40'; Sentnor (yellow card) 60'; Phair (yellow card) 90+7'	Stadium: CPKC Stadium; Attendance: 11,500; Referee: Shawn Tehini

August 9, 2026 17	Seattle Reign	2–2	Angel City FC	Seattle, Washington
6:00 p.m. PDT (UTC-7)	Menti 50'; Fishel 52'; Huerta (yellow card) 76'	Report	Thompson 32'; Chilufya 72'; Sams (yellow card) 86'	Stadium: Lumen Field; Attendance: 7,102; Referee: Brad Jensen

August 16, 2026 18	Angel City FC	1–1	Washington Spirit	Los Angeles, California
6:00 p.m. PDT (UTC-7)	Sentnor 85'; King (yellow card) 90+7'	Report	Rodman 65'	Stadium: BMO Stadium; Attendance: 18,089; Referee: Alyssa Pennington

August 23, 2026 19	Angel City FC	0–0	Gotham FC	Los Angeles, California
5:00 p.m. PDT (UTC-7)	Chilufya (yellow card) 45+5'; Ary Borges (yellow card) 67'	Report	Shaw (yellow card) 59'; Reiten (penalty missed) 87'; Dudley (yellow card) 90+5'	Stadium: BMO Stadium; Attendance: 15,860; Referee: Gerald Flores

August 26, 2026 20	North Carolina Courage	2–0	Angel City FC	Cary, North Carolina
5:00 p.m. PDT (UTC-7)	Sanchez 41', 78'	Report	Ary Borges (yellow card) 21'	Stadium: WakeMed Soccer Park; Attendance: 6,217; Referee: Elvis Osmanovic

August 31, 2026 21	Boston Legacy FC	2–5	Angel City FC	Foxborough, Massachusetts
5:00 p.m. PDT (UTC-7)	S. Smith 8'; Traoré 88'	Report	Sentnor 5'; Chilufya 14', 58'; Jónsdóttir 18'; Niehues 66'	Stadium: Gillette Stadium; Attendance: 9,681; Referee: Muhammad Hassan

===== September =====
September 5, 2026 22	Racing Louisville FC	0–2	Angel City FC	Louisville, Kentucky
3:30 p.m. PDT (UTC-7)	Hodge (yellow card) 38'	Report	Shores 69', 90+1'; Jónsdóttir (yellow card) 86'	Stadium: Lynn Family Stadium; Attendance: 5,782; Referee: Laadi Issaka

September 11, 2026 23	Angel City FC	3–3	Denver Summit FC	Los Angeles, California
7:00 p.m. PDT (UTC-7)	Niehues 45'; Chilufya 63'; Sentnor 74' (pen.)	Report	Yamamoto 49'; Heaps 50', (yellow card) 71'; Sonis 61'; Oke (yellow card) 73'	Stadium: BMO Stadium; Attendance: 15,062; Referee: Brandon Stevis

September 16, 2026 24	Angel City FC	3–1	Seattle Reign FC	Los Angeles, California
7:00 p.m. PDT (UTC-7)	Sentnor 20' (pen.); Ary Borges 40'; Niehues (yellow card) 52'; Suarez 81'	Report	Curry (yellow card) 34'; Meza (yellow card) 43'; Menti (yellow card) 80'; Huerta 90+2'	Stadium: BMO Stadium; Attendance: 13,208; Referee: Atahan Yaya

September 20, 2026 25	Utah Royals	0–3	Angel City FC	Sandy, Utah
4:00 p.m. PDT (UTC-7)	Cronin (red card) 11'; Tejada (red card) 24'; Milazzo (yellow card) 81'	Report	Sentnor 26' (pen.), (yellow card) 70'; Chilufya (yellow card) 45+1'; Suarez 47'; Jónsdóttir 67'	Stadium: America First Field; Attendance: 6,492; Referee: Matthew Corrigan

September 26, 2026 26	Washington Spirit	0–1	Angel City FC	Washington, D.C.
3:30 p.m. PDT (UTC-7)		Report	King (yellow card) 26'; Shores (yellow card) 45+1'; Sentnor (yellow card) 74'; Niehues 88'	Stadium: Audi Field; Attendance: 19,215; Referee: Matthew Thompson

===== October =====
October 4, 2026 27	Gotham FC	1–1	Angel City FC	Harrison, New Jersey
9:00 a.m. PDT (UTC-7)	Shaw 66'	Report	Niehues (yellow card) 76'; Suarez 90+1'	Stadium: Sports Illustrated Stadium; Attendance: 13,475; Referee: Nabil Bensalah

October 17, 2026 28	Denver Summit FC	2–3	Angel City FC	Centennial, Colorado
5:45 p.m. PDT (UTC-7)	Kössler 2'; Heaps 18'; Regan (yellow card) 64'; Lynch (yellow card) 74'	Report	Ary Borges (yellow card) 22'; Jónsdóttir 32'; Suarez 39'; Sentnor 43', (yellow card) 88'	Stadium: Centennial Stadium; Attendance: 12,372; Referee: Katja Koroleva

October 24, 2026 29	Angel City FC	2–0	Bay FC	Los Angeles, California
5:45 p.m. PDT (UTC-7)	King (yellow card) 13'; Thompson 49'; Lageyre (yellow card) 52'; Tiernan 83'	Report	Moreau (yellow card) 67'	Stadium: BMO Stadium; Attendance: 20,548; Referee: Shawn Tehini

===== November =====
November 1, 2026 30	Angel City FC	4–1	Boston Legacy FC	Carson, California
2:00 p.m. PDT (UTC-7)	Martin 17'; Borges (yellow card) 19'; Shores 53'; Jónsdóttir 72'; Emslie 84'	Report	Gutierres 37'	Stadium: Dignity Health Sports Park; Attendance: 17,860; Referee: Brad Jensen

=== Playoffs ===
Quarterfinals
1	Gotham FC
8	Seattle Reign FC
4	Kansas City Current
5	Angel City FC
2	San Diego Wave FC	0
7	Utah Royals	1
3	Washington Spirit
6	Portland Thorns FC

Semifinals
7	Utah Royals

Championship

November 7 Quarterfinals	Kansas City Current	1–0 (a.e.t.)	Angel City FC	Kansas City, Missouri
11:30 a.m. CDT	Cooper 96' (pen.); Chaŵinga (yellow card) 114'	Report	Jónsdóttir (yellow card) 13'; Ary Borges (yellow card) 58'; Niehues (yellow card) 90+12'	Stadium: CPKC Stadium; Attendance: 11,500; Referee: Alexandra Billeter

== Transactions ==
=== Contract options ===
Date	Nat.	Player	Pos.	Notes	Ref.
November 11, 2025	(United States)	Elizabeth Eddy	DF	Contract expired.	
November 11, 2025	(United States)	Madison Hammond	MF	Contract expired and signed with Utah Royals.	
November 11, 2025	(Japan)	Miyabi Moriya	DF	Contract expired and signed with Utah Royals.	
November 11, 2025	(Canada)	Megan Reid	DF	Contract expired and signed with Denver Summit FC.	
November 11, 2025	(Japan)	Hannah Stambaugh	GK	Contract expired and signed with Boston Legacy FC.	
December 11, 2025	(United States)	Lily Nabet	MF	Contract expired and signed with Carolina Ascent FC.	
September 22, 2026	(United States)	Meagan McClelland	GK	Short-term contract expired.	

=== Re-signings ===
Date	Nat.	Player	Pos.	Notes	Ref.
November 18, 2025	(Japan)	Hina Sugita	MF	Re-signed on a new contract through 2029.	
December 2, 2025	(United States)	Nealy Martin	MF	Re-signed on a new contract through 2027.	
January 13, 2026	(United States)	Riley Tiernan	FW	Re-signed on a new contract through 2028.	
June 10, 2026	(United States)	Faith Nguyen	GK	Re-signed on a new contract through 2026.	

=== Transfers in ===
Date	Nat.	Player	Pos.	Previous club	Fee/notes	Ref.
January 6, 2026	(Brazil)	Ary Borges	MF	(United States) Racing Louisville FC	Signed contract through 2028 season.	
January 7, 2026	(United States)	Karsyn Cherry	DF	(United States) Louisville Cardinals	Signed contract through 2028 season.	
January 7, 2026	(United States)	Carina Lageyre	MF	(United States) Duke Blue Devils	Signed contract through 2028 season.	
January 8, 2026	(United States)	Taylor Suarez	MF	(United States) Florida State Seminoles	Signed contract through 2028 season.	
January 9, 2026	(United States)	Emily Sams	DF	(United States) Orlando Pride	Acquired from Orlando Pride in exchange for $650,000 in intra-league transfer funds. Signed contract through 2028 season.	
January 14, 2026	(United States)	Faith Nguyen	GK	(United States) Texas Tech Red Raiders	Signed to a six-month contract.	
June 19, 2026	(United States)	Ally Sentnor	MF	(United States) Kansas City Current	Acquired from Kansas City Current in exchange for $850,000 in intra-league transfer funds. Signed contract through the 2029 season.	
July 31, 2026	(United States)	Jennie Immethun	MF	(United States) Portland Thorns FC	Free trade agreement. Signed to an initial short-term roster relief contract through September 6, 2026, then extended through the end of the 2026 season on September 10.	
August 7, 2026	(United States)	Meagan McClelland	GK	(United States) Carolina Ascent FC	Signed to a short-term contract through the end of the 2026 season.	
November 5, 2026	(United States)	Maddie DiMaria	FW	(United States) Cor Jesu Chargers	Signed to a contract through the end of the 2030 season.	

=== Transfers out ===
Date	Nat.	Player	Pos.	Destination club	Fee/notes	Ref.
December 23, 2025	(Germany)	Sara Doorsoun	DF	(Germany) Eintracht Frankfurt	Contract mutually terminated and subsequently re-signed for Eintracht Frankfurt.	
January 14, 2026	(United States)	Macey Hodge	MF	(United States) Racing Louisville FC	Traded in exchange for $55,000 in intra-league transfer funds, $28,000 in allocation funds and international spots for both 2026 and 2027.	
June 17, 2026	(United States)	Kennedy Fuller	MF	(United States) Bay FC	Traded in exchange for $500,000 in intra-league transfer funds and $28,000 in allocation funds.	
August 18, 2026	(South Korea)	Casey Phair	FW	(Netherlands) Feyenoord	Transferred in exchange for an undisclosed fee.	

=== Retirements ===
Date	Nat.	Player	Pos.	Ref.
November 2, 2025	(United States)	Christen Press	FW	
November 2, 2025	(New Zealand)	Ali Riley	DF	

=== Injury listings ===
Date	Nat.	Player	Pos.	List	Injury/notes	Ref.
May 9, 2025	(United States)	Savy King	DF	Season-ending injury	Cardiac event. Removed from SEI list on February 14, 2026.	
March 17, 2026	(Japan)	Hina Sugita	MF	Season-ending injury	Anterior cruciate ligament injury.	
July 30, 2026	(Japan)	Jun Endo	FW	Season-ending injury	Anterior cruciate ligament injury.	

== Statistics ==
As of November 1, 2026

=== Appearances and goals ===
Starting appearances are listed first, followed by substitute appearances after the + symbol where applicable.

No.	Pos	Nat	Player	Total		NWSL		Playoffs	
No.	Pos	Nat	Player	Apps	Goals	Apps	Goals	Apps	Goals
Goalkeepers
13	GK	(United States) USA	Hannah Seabert	1	0	0+1	0	0	0
19	GK	(United States) USA	Angelina Anderson	30	0	30	0	0	0
30	GK	(United States) USA	Faith Nguyen	0	0	0	0	0	0
41	GK	(United States) USA	Meagan McClelland	0	0	0	0	0	0
Defenders
3	DF	(United States) USA	Savy King	17	0	13+4	0	0	0
4	DF	(United States) USA	Karsyn Cherry	6	0	1+5	0	0	0
6	DF	(United States) USA	Emily Sams	30	1	30	1	0	0
11	DF	(United States) USA	Sarah Gorden	29	0	28+1	0	0	0
15	DF	(United States) USA	Evelyn Shores	28	4	26+2	4	0	0
20	DF	(United States) USA	Gisele Thompson	30	5	30	5	0	0
25	DF	(United States) USA	Sophia Mattice	4	0	2+2	0	0	0
Midfielders
7	MF	(Japan) JPN	Hina Sugita	0	0	0	0	0	0
8	MF	(Brazil) BRA	Ary Borges	27	3	26+1	3	0	0
12	MF	(Brazil) BRA	Maiara Niehues	23	9	16+7	9	0	0
14	MF	(United States) USA	Nealy Martin	24	1	14+10	1	0	0
16	MF	(United States) USA	Carina Lageyre	25	0	21+4	0	0	0
17	MF	(United States) USA	Ally Sentnor	19	6	19	6	0	0
40	MF	(United States) USA	Jennie Immethun	2	0	0+2	0	0	0
Forwards
2	FW	(United States) USA	Sydney Leroux	1	0	0+1	0	0	0
10	FW	(Scotland) SCO	Claire Emslie	18	0	7+11	0	0	0
18	FW	(Japan) JPN	Jun Endo	9	0	6+3	0	0	0
24	FW	(Zambia) ZAM	Prisca Chilufya	24	5	8+16	5	0	0
32	FW	(Iceland) ISL	Sveindís Jane Jónsdóttir	23	10	22+1	10	0	0
33	FW	(United States) USA	Riley Tiernan	23	2	10+13	2	0	0
99	FW	(United States) USA	Taylor Suarez	28	5	12+16	5	0	0
Other players (departed during season, short-term loan, etc.)
9	FW	(South Korea) KOR	Casey Phair	8	0	1+7	0		
17	FW	(United States) USA	Kennedy Fuller	11	2	8+3	2		
27	FW	(Colombia) COL	Maithé López	0	0	0	0		
37	FW	(United States) USA	Rajanah Reed	0	0	0	0		

=== Goals ===
Pos.	No.	Pos.	Nat.	Name	NWSL	Playoffs	Total
1	32	FW	(Iceland)	Sveindís Jane Jónsdóttir	10	0	10
2	12	MF	(Brazil)	Maiara Niehues	9	0	9
3	17	MF	(United States)	Ally Sentnor	6	0	6
4	20	DF	(United States)	Gisele Thompson	5	0	5
4	99	FW	(United States)	Taylor Suarez	5	0	5
4	24	FW	(Zambia)	Prisca Chilufya	5	0	5
7	15	DF	(United States)	Evelyn Shores	4	0	4
8	8	MF	(Brazil)	Ary Borges	3	0	3
9	17	FW	(United States)	Kennedy Fuller	2	0	2
9	33	FW	(United States)	Riley Tiernan	2	0	2
11	6	DF	(United States)	Emily Sams	1	0	1
11	14	MF	(United States)	Nealy Martin	1	0	1
11	10	MF	(Scotland)	Claire Emslie	1	0	1
Total					54	0	54

=== Assists ===
Rank	No.	Pos.	Nat.	Name	NWSL	Playoffs	Total
1	15	DF	(United States)	Evelyn Shores	8	0	8
2	32	FW	(Iceland)	Sveindís Jane Jónsdóttir	4	0	4
2	20	DF	(United States)	Gisele Thompson	4	0	4
4	11	DF	(United States)	Sarah Gorden	3	0	3
4	17	MF	(United States)	Ally Sentnor	3	0	3
6	8	MF	(Brazil)	Ary Borges	2	0	2
6	17	FW	(United States)	Kennedy Fuller	2	0	2
6	3	DF	(United States)	Savy King	2	0	2
6	6	DF	(United States)	Emily Sams	2	0	2
6	14	MF	(United States)	Nealy Martin	2	0	2
6	16	MF	(United States)	Carina Lageyre	2	0	2
6	99	FW	(United States)	Taylor Suarez	2	0	2
13	24	FW	(Zambia)	Prisca Chilufya	1	0	1
13	25	DF	(United States)	Sophia Mattice	1	0	1
13	12	MF	(Brazil)	Maiara Niehues	1	0	1
Total					39	0	39

=== Clean sheets ===
Rank	No.	Nat.	Name	NWSL	Playoffs	Total
1	13	(United States)	Angelina Anderson	10	0	10
Total				10	0	10

=== Disciplinary cards ===
Player					NWSL		Playoffs		Total	
Rank	Pos.	No.	Nat.	Name	Yellow card	Red card	Yellow card	Red card	Yellow card	Red card
1	MF	8	(Brazil)	Ary Borges	5	0	0	0	5	0
2	DF	6	(United States)	Emily Sams	4	0	0	0	4	0
2	DF	15	(United States)	Evelyn Shores	4	0	0	0	4	0
2	FW	32	(Iceland)	Sveindís Jane Jónsdóttir	4	0	0	0	4	0
2	DF	3	(United States)	Savy King	4	0	0	0	4	0
6	FW	9	(South Korea)	Casey Phair	3	0	0	0	3	0
6	MF	17	(United States)	Ally Sentnor	3	0	0	0	3	0
6	MF	12	(Brazil)	Maiara Niehues	2	1	0	0	2	1
9	DF	11	(United States)	Sarah Gorden	2	0	0	0	2	0
9	MF	14	(United States)	Nealy Martin	2	0	0	0	2	0
9	FW	10	(Scotland)	Claire Emslie	2	0	0	0	2	0
9	FW	24	(Zambia)	Prisca Chilufya	2	0	0	0	2	0
13	MF	16	(United States)	Carina Lageyre	1	0	0	0	1	0
Total					38	1	0	0	38	1
