= 2025 Orlando Pride season =

Orlando Pride
2025 season
- Head coach: Seb Hines
- Stadium: Inter&Co Stadium; Orlando, Florida
- NWSL: 4th
- Playoffs: First Round
- 2025–26 W Cup: Group Stage
- Challenge Cup: Runner-up
Home colors	Away colors

The 2025 Orlando Pride season is the Orlando Pride's 10th season in the National Women's Soccer League, the top division of women's soccer in the United States. They enter as defending NWSL Shield winners and NWSL champions.

== Notable events ==
In August 2024, the NWSL Draft was abolished ahead of the 2025 season as part of the new Collective Bargaining Agreement. The NWSL became the first major professional sports league in the United States to eliminate the draft system.

== Roster ==
As of October 25, 2025

No.	Nationality	Name	Position(s)	Date of birth (age)	Previous club	Notes
Goalkeepers
1	(England)	Anna Moorhouse	GK	March 30, 1995 (age 31)	(France) Bordeaux	–
40	(United States)	McKinley Crone	GK	October 20, 1998 (age 28)	(United States) Alabama Crimson Tide	–
77	(United States)	Cosette Morché	GK	June 29, 1997 (age 29)	(United States) Fort Lauderdale United FC	–
Defenders
3	(United States)	Kylie Strom	DF	March 18, 1992 (age 34)	(Spain) Atlético Madrid	–
4	(Brazil)	Rafaelle Souza	DF	June 18, 1991 (age 35)	(England) Arsenal	SEI
6	(United States)	Emily Sams	DF	July 1, 1999 (age 27)	(Sweden) BK Häcken	–
12	(United States)	Cori Dyke	DF	September 20, 2000 (age 26)	(United States) Penn State Nittany Lions	–
19	(United States)	Carson Pickett	DF	September 15, 1993 (age 33)	(United States) Racing Louisville	–
21	(Spain)	Oihane Hernández	DF	May 4, 2000 (age 26)	(Spain) Real Madrid	INT
25	(United States)	Kerry Abello	DF	September 17, 1999 (age 27)	(United States) Penn State Nittany Lions	–
34	(Canada)	Zara Chavoshi	DF	December 6, 2002 (age 23)	(United States) Wake Forest Demon Deacons	–
Midfielders
2	(United States)	Haley McCutcheon	DF	February 22, 1996 (age 30)	(United States) Houston Dash	–
8	(Brazil)	Luana	MF	May 2, 1993 (age 33)	(Brazil) Corinthians	INT, SEI
14	(United States)	Viviana Villacorta	MF	February 2, 1999 (age 27)	(United States) UCLA Bruins	–
15	(Brazil)	Angelina	MF	January 26, 2000 (age 26)	(United States) Seattle Reign FC	–
23	(Zambia)	Grace Chanda	MF	June 11, 1997 (age 29)	(Spain) Madrid CFF	INT, SEI
28	(United States)	Summer Yates	MF	June 17, 2000 (age 26)	(United States) Washington Huskies	–
30	(United States)	Ally Lemos	MF	March 4, 2004 (age 22)	(United States) UCLA Bruins	–
Forwards
10	(Brazil)	Marta	FW	February 19, 1986 (age 40)	(Sweden) FC Rosengård	–
11	(United States)	Ally Watt	FW	March 12, 1997 (age 29)	(United States) Seattle Reign FC	–
13	(United States)	Jacqueline Ovalle	FW	October 19, 1999 (age 27)	(Mexico) Tigres	–
18	(United States)	Simone Charley	FW	February 4, 1995 (age 31)	(United States) Angel City FC	SEI
20	(United States)	Julie Doyle	FW	August 30, 1998 (age 28)	(United States) Santa Clara Broncos	–
22	(Zambia)	Barbra Banda	FW	March 20, 2000 (age 26)	(China) Shanghai Shengli	INT, SEI
27	(United States)	Elyse Bennett	FW	December 27, 1999 (age 26)	(Spain) Deportivo de La Coruña	–
35	(United States)	Simone Jackson	FW	January 28, 2003 (age 23)	(United States) USC Trojans	–

== Staff ==
As of March 3, 2023.

Executive
Majority owner and chairman	(United States) Mark Wilf
Majority owner and vice-chair	(United States) Zygi Wilf
Majority owner and vice-chair	(United States) Leonard Wilf
President of business operations	(United States) Jarrod Dillon
General manager	(United States) Haley Carter
Coaching staff
Head coach	(England) Seb Hines
Assistant coach	(Jamaica) Giles Barnes
Assistant coach	(Sweden) Yolanda Thomas
Goalkeeper coach	(England) Paul Crichton
Director of medical & performance	(United States) Cory Price
Strength and conditioning coach	(United States) Christi Edson

== Match results ==
=== Challenge Cup ===
Orlando Pride will contest the NWSL Challenge Cup for the first time since it was switched to a super cup format between the winners of the NWSL Shield and NWSL Championship. As Orlando won both, 2024 Shield and Championship runners-up Washington Spirit were invited to contest the 2025 Challenge Cup. The match will serve as the season opener for the NWSL.

March 7	Orlando Pride	1–1 (2–4 p)	Washington Spirit	Orlando, Florida
8:00 pm EDT	Rafaelle 41'	Report	Santos 72'	Stadium: Inter&Co Stadium; Referee: Alex Billeter
	Penalties
	Doyle (penalty scored); Angelina (penalty scored); Yates (penalty missed); Lemos (penalty missed)		(penalty scored) Hatch; (penalty scored) Bernal; (penalty scored) Miura; (penalty scored) McKeown

=== National Women's Soccer League ===
The NWSL regular season will be played on a balanced schedule i.e. each team will play every other team twice; once at home and once away. The top eight teams will qualify for the playoffs.

Results summary

Overall								Home						Away					
Pld	W	D	L	GF	GA	GD	Pts	W	D	L	GF	GA	GD	W	D	L	GF	GA	GD
26	11	7	8	33	27	+6	40	5	4	4	17	12	+5	6	3	4	16	15	+1

Last updated: November 2, 2025.
Source: NWSLsoccer.com

==== Results by round ====
Round	1	2	3	4	5	6	7	8	9	10	11	12	13	14	15	16	17	18	19	20	21	22	23	24	25	26
Stadium	H	A	H	A	H	H	A	A	H	A	H	A	A	H	H	A	A	H	A	H	H	A	A	H	A	H
Result	W	W	W	W	L	W	L	D	L	W	W	W	L	D	D	D	L	L	L	D	L	W	D	W	W	D
Position (Note: ORL's position at the end of the matchweek, not their match.)	1	1	1	1	2	1	1	2	3	3	2	2	2	2	2	3	4	4	5	7	7	5	6	3	3	4

Updated to match(es) played on November 2, 2025. Source: NWSLsoccer.com
A = Away; H = Home; W = Win; D = Draw; L = Loss

==== Results ====
March 14 1	Orlando Pride	6–0	Chicago Stars	Orlando, Florida
8:00 pm	McCutcheon 7'; Watt 36'; Anderson 47' (o.g.); Doyle 65'; Banda 80', 87'; Chilufya (yellow card) 82'	Report	Gomes (yellow card) 52'; Malham (yellow card) 60'	Stadium: Inter&Co Stadium; Attendance: 19,237; Referee: Shawn Tehini

March 23 2	Gotham FC	0–2	Orlando Pride	Harrison, New Jersey
7:00 pm	Carter (yellow card) 45+1'; Stevens (yellow card) 70'	Report	Reale 2' (o.g.); Watt (yellow card) 7'; Marta 45+2' (pen.)	Stadium: Sports Illustrated Stadium; Attendance: 9,718; Referee: Brad Jensen

March 29 3	Orlando Pride	2–1	San Diego Wave	Orlando, Florida
12:00 pm	McCutcheon 50'; Marta 72' (pen.); Chilufya (yellow card) 90+3'	Report	Cascarino (yellow card) 42'; Okwuchukwu 62'	Stadium: Inter&Co Stadium; Attendance: 7,071; Referee: Adorae Monroy

April 12 4	Seattle Reign	0–1	Orlando Pride	Seattle, Washington
7:30 pm		Report	Banda 41'	Stadium: Lumen Field; Attendance: 7,721; Referee: Greg Dopka

April 19 5	Orlando Pride	0–1	Washington Spirit	Orlando, Florida
5:00 pm	Lemos (yellow card) 90+4'	Report	Monday 64'	Stadium: Inter&Co Stadium; Attendance: 9,021; Referee: Elton García

April 25 6	Orlando Pride	3–2	Angel City FC	Orlando, Florida
8:00 pm	Lemos (yellow card) 29'; Banda (yellow card) 45+4', (goal) 76'; Marta 71'; Vignola 90+3' (o.g.)	Report	Tiernan 9', (yellow card) 45+5'; Zelem 44'	Stadium: Inter&Co Stadium; Attendance: 6,665; Referee: Matthew Thompson

May 3 7	Portland Thorns	1–0	Orlando Pride	Portland, Oregon
7:30 pm	Reyes 16'; Hiatt (yellow card) 78'	Report	Lemos (yellow card) 42'	Stadium: Providence Park; Attendance: 17,776; Referee: Nabil Bensalah

May 10 8	North Carolina Courage	1–1	Orlando Pride	Cary, North Carolina
7:30 pm	Rauch 27'; Matsukubo (yellow card) 60'	Report	Abello (yellow card) 33'; Chilufya 90+3'	Stadium: WakeMed Soccer Park; Attendance: 9,366; Referee: Brad Jensen

May 16 9	Orlando Pride	0–1	Kansas City Current	Orlando, Florida
8:00 pm	Chawinga 52'	Report		Stadium: Inter&Co Stadium; Attendance: 8,414; Referee: Natalie Simon

May 23 10	Utah Royals	1–3	Orlando Pride	Sandy, Utah
9:30 pm	Mozingo 14'; Flynn (yellow card) 50'	Report	Banda 6', 37', 38', (yellow card) 59'	Stadium: America First Field; Attendance: 11,668; Referee: John Griggs

June 7 11	Orlando Pride	1–0	Houston Dash	Orlando, Florida
7:00 pm		Report		Stadium: Inter&Co Stadium; Attendance: 9,766; Referee: Benjamin Meyer

June 13 12	Bay FC	0–1	Orlando Pride	San Jose, California
10:00 pm		Report		Stadium: PayPal Park; Attendance: 12,127; Referee: Muhammad Hassan

June 20 13	Racing Louisville	2–0	Orlando Pride	Louisville, Kentucky
8:00 pm		Report		Stadium: Lynn Family Stadium; Attendance: 5,469; Referee: John Matto

August 3 14	Orlando Pride	1–1	Utah Royals	Orlando, Florida
6:00 pm		Report		Stadium: Inter&Co Stadium; Referee: Jaclyn Metz

August 9 15	Orlando Pride	1–1	Racing Louisville	Orlando, Florida
7:30 pm		Report		Stadium: Inter&Co Stadium; Referee: Iryna Petrunok

August 16 16	Kansas City Current	0–0	Orlando Pride	Kansas City, Missouri
4:00 pm		Report		Stadium: CPKC Stadium; Referee: Brad Jensen

August 21 17	Angel City FC	1–0	Orlando Pride	Los Angeles, California
10:30 pm		Report		Stadium: BMO Stadium; Referee: Matt Trotter

August 29 18	Orlando Pride	0–2	Gotham FC	Orlando, Florida
8:00 pm		Report	González 13'; Howell 45+1'	Stadium: Inter&Co Stadium; Attendance: 7,132

September 6 19	Chicago Stars FC	5–2	Orlando Pride	Evanston, Illinois
	Staab 50'; Joseph 54' (yellow card) 85'; Franklin 65' (yellow card) 81'; Grosso 69'; Ludmila 89'; Nesbeth (yellow card) 90+4'	Report	Rafaelle (yellow card) 48'; Pickett 53'; McCutcheon 72'	Attendance: 10,127; Referee: Mark Verso

September 13 20	Orlando Pride	1–1	Bay FC	Orlando, Florida
5:00 pm	Watt 70'	Report	Kundananji 45+4'; Hubly (yellow card) 47'; Collins (yellow card) 53'	Stadium: Inter&Co Stadium; Referee: Natalie Simon

September 19 21	Orlando Pride	0–1	North Carolina Courage	Orlando, Florida
7:30 pm		Report	Koyama 89'	Stadium: Inter&Co Stadium; Referee: Matthew Thompson

September 26 22	San Diego Wave	1–2	Orlando Pride	San Diego, California
10:30 pm	Dudinha 10'	Report	Ovalle 8'; Pickett 54'	Stadium: Snapdragon Stadium; Referee: Gerald Flores

October 3 23	Houston Dash	1–1	Orlando Pride	Houston, Texas
8:00 pm	Berkely 62'	Report	Charley 85'	Stadium: Shell Energy Stadium; Referee: John Griggs

October 10 24	Orlando Pride	1–0	Portland Thorns	Orlando, Florida
8:00 pm	McKenzie 90+2' (o.g.)	Report		Stadium: Inter&Co Stadium; Referee: Shawn Tehini

October 18 25	Washington Spirit	2–3	Orlando Pride	Buzzard Point, Washington D.C.
12:30 pm	Abello 35' (o.g.); Cantore 42'	Report	Abello 38'; Miura 46' (o.g.); Marta 72' (pen.)	Stadium: Audi Field; Referee: Jeremy Scheer

November 2 26	Orlando Pride	1–1	Seattle Reign	Orlando, Florida
TBD	Pickett 87'; Yates (yellow card) 85'		Huerta (yellow card) 35'; Mercado (yellow card) 59'; Mondésir (yellow card) 70'; Bugg 79'	Stadium: Inter&Co Stadium; Referee: Brad Jensen

==== League standings ====
Pos	Team	Pld	W	D	L	GF	GA	GD	Pts	Qualification
2	Washington Spirit	26	12	8	6	42	33	+9	44	Playoffs and CONCACAF W Champions Cup
3	Portland Thorns FC	26	11	7	8	36	29	+7	40	Playoffs
4	Orlando Pride	26	11	7	8	33	27	+6	40	Playoffs
5	Seattle Reign FC	26	10	9	7	32	29	+3	39	Playoffs
6	San Diego Wave FC	26	10	7	9	41	34	+7	37	Playoffs

Source: NWSL
Rules for classification: 1) points; 2) total goal difference; 3) total wins; 4) total goals scored; 5) head-to-head points; 6) head-to-head goals scored; 7) fewest disciplinary points; 8) coin toss (if 2 clubs tied) or drawing of lots (if ≥3 clubs tied).

=== NWSL playoffs ===
==== Bracket ====
Quarterfinals
1	Kansas City Current	1
8	Gotham FC (a.e.t.)	2
4	Orlando Pride	2
5	Seattle Reign FC	0
2	Washington Spirit (p)	1 (3)
7	Racing Louisville FC	1 (1)
3	Portland Thorns FC (a.e.t.)	1
6	San Diego Wave FC	0

Semifinals
8	Gotham FC	1
4	Orlando Pride	0
2	Washington Spirit	2
3	Portland Thorns FC	0

Championship
8	Gotham FC	1
2	Washington Spirit	0

==== Results ====
November 7, 2025 Quarterfinals	Orlando Pride	2–0	Seattle Reign FC	Orlando, Florida
8:00 pm EST	McCutcheon 21'; Luana 90+8' (pen.)	Report		Stadium: Inter&Co Stadium; Attendance: 11,355; Referee: Abdou Ndiaye

November 16, 2025 Semifinals	Orlando Pride	0–1	Gotham FC	Orlando, Florida
3:00 pm EST		Report	Shaw 90+7'	Stadium: Inter&Co Stadium; Attendance: 15,714; Referee: Alyssa Pennington

=== 2025–26 CONCACAF W Champions Cup ===
==== Group A ====
Pos	Team	Pld	W	D	L	GF	GA	GD	Pts	Qualification	AME	PAC	ORL	ALA	CHO
1	(Mexico) América	4	3	1	0	12	0	+12	10	Advance to knockout stage	—	1–0	2–0	—	—
2	(Mexico) Pachuca	4	2	1	1	12	2	+10	7	Advance to knockout stage	—	—	—	5–0	6–0
3	(United States) Orlando Pride	4	2	1	1	9	3	+6	7		—	1–1	—	3–0	—
4	(Costa Rica) Alajuelense	4	1	1	2	1	8	−7	4		0–0	—	—	—	1–0
5	(Panama) Chorrillo	4	0	0	4	0	21	−21	0		0–9	—	0–5	—	—

Source: CONCACAF
Rules for classification: Tiebreakers

==== Results ====
September 2 Group Stage	Orlando Pride (United States)	3–0	(Costa Rica) Alajuelense	Orlando, Florida
7:00 pm	Doyle 49'; Pickett 64'; Jackson 81'	Report		Stadium: Inter&Co Stadium; Referee: Janeishka Caban

September 16 Group Stage	Chorrillo (Panama)	0–5	(United States) Orlando Pride	Panama City, Panama
9:00 pm	Rivera (yellow card) 54'	Report	Doyle 4'; Yates 6', 22', 57' (pen.); Chavosi (yellow card) 17'; Doyle (yellow card) 60'; Lemos 84'; Lemos (yellow card) 90'	Stadium: Estadio Rommel Fernández; Referee: Priscila Eritzel Pérez Borja

September 30 Group Stage	América (Mexico)	2–0	(United States) Orlando Pride	Mexico City, Mexico
9:00 pm	Palacios 7'; Gutiérrez 79'; Cabanillas (yellow card) 78'	Report	Luana (yellow card) 51'; Chavosi (yellow card) 90+1'	Stadium: Estadio Ciudad de los Deportes; Referee: Odette Hamilton

October 15 Group Stage	Orlando Pride (United States)	1–1	(Mexico) Pachuca	Orlando, Florida
9:15 pm	Marta 25'; Dyke (yellow card) 81'	Report	Ihezuo 54'; Minota (yellow card) 67'	Stadium: Inter&Co Stadium; Referee: Carly Marissa Shaw-MacLaren

== Squad statistics ==
=== Appearances ===
Starting appearances are listed first, followed by substitute appearances after the + symbol where applicable.

No.	Pos	Nat	Player	Total		NWSL		Challenge Cup		CONCACAF W Cup	
No.	Pos	Nat	Player	Apps	Goals	Apps	Goals	Apps	Goals	Apps	Goals
Goalkeepers
1	GK	(England) ENG	Anna Moorhouse	26	0	25	0	1	0	0	0
40	GK	(United States) USA	McKinley Crone	4	0	2	0	0	0	2	0
77	GK	(United States) USA	Cosette Morché	2	0	0	0	0	0	2	0
Defenders
2	DF	(United States) USA	Haley McCutcheon	28	3	26	3	1	0	1	0
3	DF	(United States) USA	Kylie Strom	18	0	17	0	1	0	0	0
4	DF	(Brazil) BRA	Rafaelle Souza	15	1	12	0	1	1	2	0
6	DF	(United States) USA	Emily Sams	29	0	25	0	1	0	3	0
12	DF	(United States) USA	Cori Dyke	25	1	22	1	0	0	3	0
19	DF	(United States) USA	Carson Pickett	25	4	22	3	0	0	3	1
21	DF	(Spain) ESP	Oihane Hernández	23	0	20	0	0	0	3	0
25	DF	(United States) USA	Kerry Abello	24	1	23	1	1	0	0	0
34	DF	(Canada) CAN	Zara Chavoshi	13	0	10	0	0	0	3	0
Midfielders
8	MF	(Brazil) BRA	Luana	8	0	4	0	0	0	4	0
14	MF	(United States) USA	Viviana Villacorta	10	0	6	0	0	0	4	0
15	MF	(Brazil) BRA	Angelina	27	0	24	0	1	0	2	0
23	MF	(Zambia) ZAM	Grace Chanda	7	0	4	0	0	0	3	0
28	MF	(United States) USA	Summer Yates	21	3	16	0	1	0	4	3
30	MF	(United States) USA	Ally Lemos	29	1	26	0	1	0	2	1
Forwards
10	FW	(Brazil) BRA	Marta	24	5	22	4	1	0	1	1
13	FW	(Brazil) BRA	Jessica Ovalle	10	1	8	1	0	0	2	0
18	FW	(United States) USA	Simone Charley	12	1	9	1	0	0	3	0
20	FW	(United States) USA	Julie Doyle	16	3	11	1	1	0	4	2
22	FW	(Zambia) ZAM	Barbra Banda	17	8	16	8	1	0	0	0
27	FW	(United States) USA	Elyse Bennett	3	0	0	0	0	0	3	0
35	FW	(United States) USA	Simone Jackson	8	0	8	0	0	0	0	0
Players away from the club on loan:
7	FW	(Argentina) ARG	Mariana Larroquette	4	0	4	0	0	0	0	0
16	MF	(United States) USA	Morgan Gautrat	12	0	11	0	1	0	0	0
29	FW	(Canada) CAN	Amanda Allen	8	0	8	0	0	0	0	0
32	DF	(United States) USA	Brianna Martínez	1	0	1	0	0	0	0	0
36	GK	(United States) USA	Kat Asman	0	0	0	0	0	0	0	0
33	MF	(United States) USA	Aryssa Mahrt	0	0	0	0	0	0	0	0
Players transferred after mid-season:
9	FW	(Zambia) ZAM	Prisca Chilufya	20	2	16	2	1	0	3	0
11	FW	(United States) USA	Ally Watt	26	2	24	2	1	0	1	0

== Transfers and loans ==
=== Transfers in ===
Date	Player	Pos.	Previous club	Fee/notes	Ref.
December 11, 2024	(United States) Kat Asman	GK	(United States) Portland Thorns	Free agent signing.	
January 13, 2025	(Canada) Zara Chavoshi	DF	(United States) Wake Forest Demon Deacons	College free agent signing.	
January 31, 2025	(Zambia) Prisca Chilufya	FW	(Mexico) Juárez	Undisclosed fee.	
February 12, 2025	(United States) DeAira Jackson	GK	(United States) Grand Canyon Antelopes	Signed to short-term contract.	
February 12, 2025	(United States) Aryssa Mahrt	MF	(United States) Wisconsin Badgers	Signed to short-term contract.	
February 14, 2025	(Spain) Oihane Hernández	DF	(Spain) Real Madrid	Undisclosed fee.	
May 29, 2025	(United States) Simone Jackson		(United States) USC Trojans	College free agent signing.	
August 6, 2025	(United States) Cosette Morché	GK	(United States) Fort Lauderdale United FC		
August 21, 2025	(Mexico) Lizbeth Ovalle	FW	(United States) Tigres		
August 31, 2025	(United States) Elyse Bennett	FW	(Spain) Deportivo de La Coruña		

=== Loans in ===
Date	Player	Pos.	Loaned from	Notes	Ref.
August 13, 2025	(United States) Ally Watt	FW	(United States) Denver Summit	Until December 31, 2025	

=== Transfers out ===
Date	Player	Pos.	Destination club	Fee/notes	Ref.
November 24, 2024	(Spain) Celia	DF	Retired		
November 24, 2024	(United States) Carrie Lawrence	DF	Retired		
November 24, 2024	(United States) Megan Montefusco	DF	Retired		
December 10, 2024	(Sweden) Evelina Duljan	MF	(United States) Houston Dash	Out of contract	
January 14, 2025	(Finland) Sofia Manner	GK	(Canada) AFC Toronto	Undisclosed fee.	
January 30, 2025	(Brazil) Adriana	FW	(Saudi Arabia) Al Qadsiah	Undisclosed fee; reportedly $500,000.	
August 13, 2025	(United States) Ally Watt	FW	(United States) Denver Summit	$75,000 in Expansion Allocation Money and $37,500 transfer cash	
October 9, 2025	(Zambia) Prisca Chilufya	FW	(United States) Angel City	$50,000 in interleague transfer funds and international slot	

=== Loans out ===
Date	Player	Pos.	Loaned to	Notes	Ref.
January 16, 2025	(Argentina) Mariana Larroquette	FW	(Argentina) Newell's Old Boys	Until July 1, 2025	
July 2, 2025	(Canada) Amanda Allen	FW	(Canada) Halifax Tides	December 31, 2025	
July 2, 2025	(United States) Brianna Martínez	DF	(United States) Carolina Ascent	December 31, 2025	
July 2, 2025	(Argentina) Mariana Larroquette	FW	(United States) Lexington	December 31, 2025	
July 2, 2025	(United States) Aryssa Mahrt	DF	(United States) Spokane Zephyr	December 31, 2025	
July 2, 2025	(United States) Kat Asman	GK	(United States) Lexington	June 30, 2026	
August 25, 2025	(United States) Morgan Gautrat	MF	(United States) Newcastle United	December 31, 2025	

=== Preseason trialists ===
Orlando Pride began preseason training on January 21, 2025. The squad included three non-roster invitees on trial with the team during preseason. All three were college free agents, available to sign freely following the abolition of the NWSL draft.

2025 Orlando Pride trialists
Player	Position	Previous team
(United States) Aryssa Mahrt	MF	(United States) Wisconsin Badgers
(United States) DeAira Jackson	GK	(United States) Grand Canyon Antelopes
(United States) Simone Jackson	FW	(United States) USC Trojans

Signed to short-term contract.
