= Emily Sams =

American soccer player (born 1999)

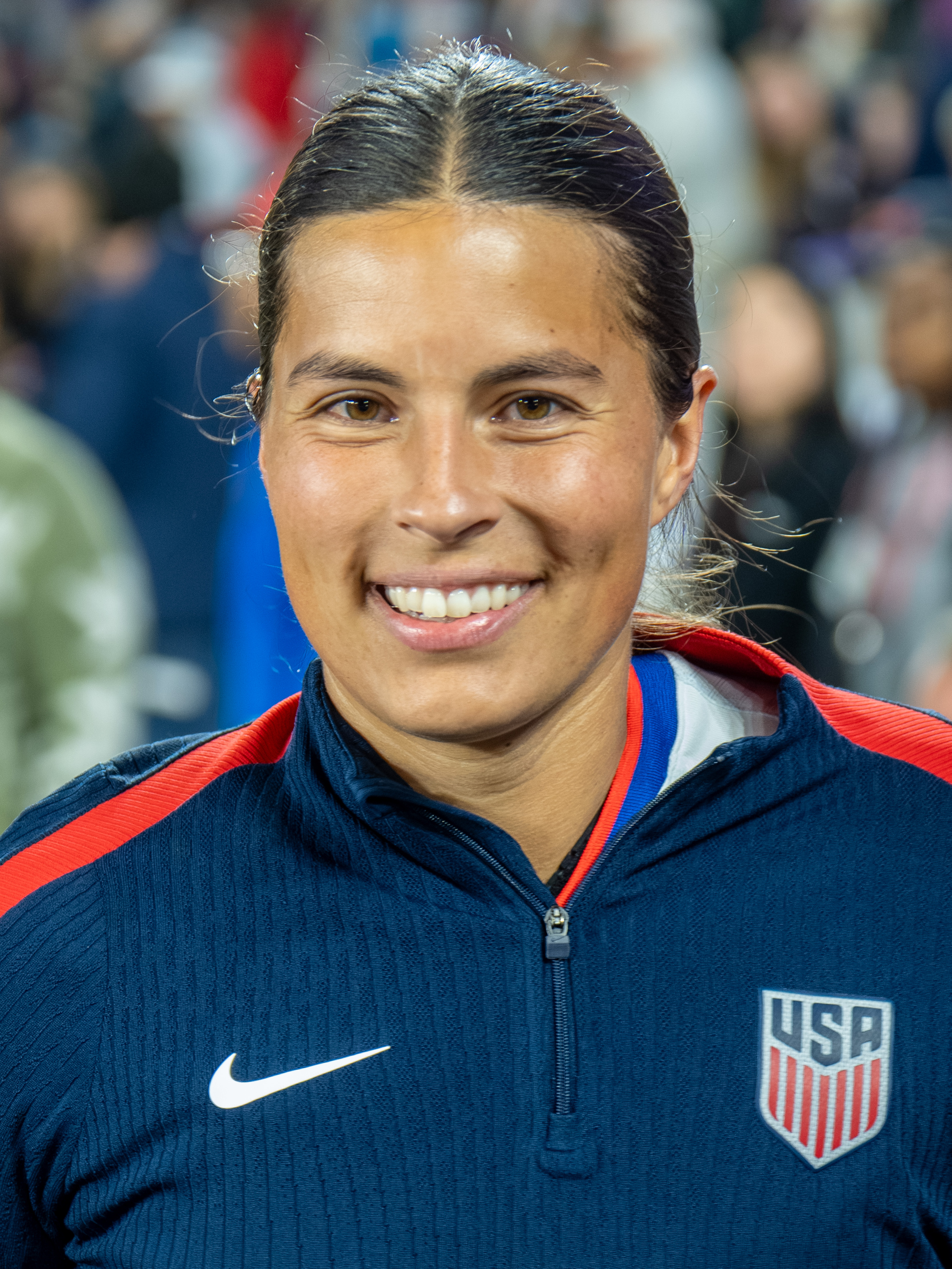
- Sams warming up with the United States in 2025

Personal information
- Full name: Emily May Sams
- Birth name: Emily May Madril
- Date of birth: July 1, 1999 (age 27)
- Place of birth: Boise, Idaho, United States
- Height: 5 ft 7 in (1.70 m)
- Positions: Center back; fullback

Team information
- Current team: Angel City

Youth career
- Gulf Coast Texans

College career
Years	Team	Apps	(Gls)
2017–2021	Florida State Seminoles	62	(6)

Senior career*
Years	Team	Apps	(Gls)
2022	Racing Louisville (USL W)	9	(4)
2022	NWSL pool	0	(0)
2022	→ BK Häcken (loan)	4	(1)
2023–2025	Orlando Pride	72	(1)
2026–	Angel City	30	(1)

International career^{‡}
2017–2018	United States U19		
2018	United States U20		
2022	United States U23		
2024–	United States	10	(1)
Medal record
Women's soccer
Representing the United States
Olympic Games
Gold medal – first place	2024 Paris	Team
- * Club domestic league appearances and goals as of 06:10, November 12, 2026 (UTC) ‡ National team caps and goals as of April 14, 2026

Emily May Sams (née Madril; born July 1, 1999) is an American professional soccer player who plays as a defender for Angel City FC of the National Women's Soccer League (NWSL) and the United States national team. Mainly a center back, she can also play right back.

Sams played college soccer for the Florida State Seminoles, winning the 2021 national championship and earning first-team All-American honors. After playing half a season in Sweden, she was drafted third overall by the Orlando Pride in the 2023 NWSL Draft. In 2024, she was named the NWSL Defender of the Year and helped lead the Pride to the NWSL Shield and NWSL Championship.

Sams trained with the youth national team from the under-19 to under-23 levels. She was included in the squad that won gold at the 2024 Paris Olympics before making her senior debut later that year.

== Early life ==
Sams was born in Boise, Idaho in 1999. Her family moved to Navarre, Florida in the summer of 2014. She attended Navarre High School where she tallied 107 goals and 70 assists for the soccer team and was honored with several individual awards including 2016 Florida Miss Soccer and twice Player of the Year by the Pensacola News Journal. She also played youth club soccer for Gulf Coast Texans.

=== Florida State Seminoles ===
Sams played three seasons of college soccer for the Seminoles at Florida State University between 2017 and 2021; she made a total of 62 appearances, starting 61, scoring six goals and registering seven assists. As a freshman she played in all 21 FSU games on the season, including 20 starts. On her collegiate debut she made two assists for Deyna Castellanos in a 3–0 win over the UNC Greensboro Spartans. She scored her first collegiate goal on October 5 in a 3–0 win over the Boston College Eagles. She redshirted for the 2018 season due to an ACL injury before being forced to sit out in 2019 with a second ACL tear. She returned in 2020 to start in all 16 games during the COVID-19 pandemic shortened season as FSU claimed both the ACC regular season and tournament titles. Individually she was named College Cup All-Tournament Team, All-ACC Second Team, United Soccer Coaches Second Team All-American.

In 2021, she started all 25 games and played a team-high 2,306 minutes in her redshirt senior year, anchoring a back line that allowed 13 goals and kept 14 shutouts. The team finished second in the regular season standings behind the Virginia Cavaliers but defended their 2021 ACC women's soccer tournament title with a 1–0 victory over the Cavaliers before going on to win the 2021 National Championship title, beating the BYU Cougars on penalty kicks in the final. She earned College Cup All-Tournament Team, All-ACC First Team, ACC All-Tournament Team and United Soccer Coaches First Team All-American honors as well being named ACC Defensive Player of the Year. Having redshirted in 2018 and accrued an additional year of eligibility following the COVID-19 impacted season, she was permitted to play one more season of college soccer but announced she would forgo it and turn professional in August 2022 after feeling disrespected by the FSU administration following the head coach search.

== Club career ==
=== Racing Louisville (W League) ===
Sams signed for the semi-professional USL W League affiliate of Racing Louisville FC in May 2022. She made nine appearances and scored four goals during the 2022 season and was named to the Best XI second team.

=== BK Häcken ===
After electing to forgo her final season at Florida State in early August 2022, partway through the 2022 NWSL season, Sams signed a professional contract directly with the NWSL on August 31, 2022. The move allowed her to retain her eligibility to have her playing rights distributed in the 2023 NWSL Draft and play in the 2023 NWSL season. In a statement, the league's Chief Legal Officer stated: "We are constantly evaluating our policies and procedures to ensure the NWSL is attracting and retaining the best players in the world." Having signed through 2025, she was loaned out to Swedish Damallsvenskan side BK Häcken FF for the remainder of the 2022 season. She made her senior club debut on September 14, 2022, starting and playing the full 90 minutes of a 3–0 Svenska Cupen third round victory over second division Jitex BK. She made a further four appearances, all in the league, scoring one goal in a 7–1 win over AIK. Despite being named as a substitute for both second qualifying round legs against Paris Saint-Germain, she did not appear in the UEFA Women's Champions League.

=== Orlando Pride ===
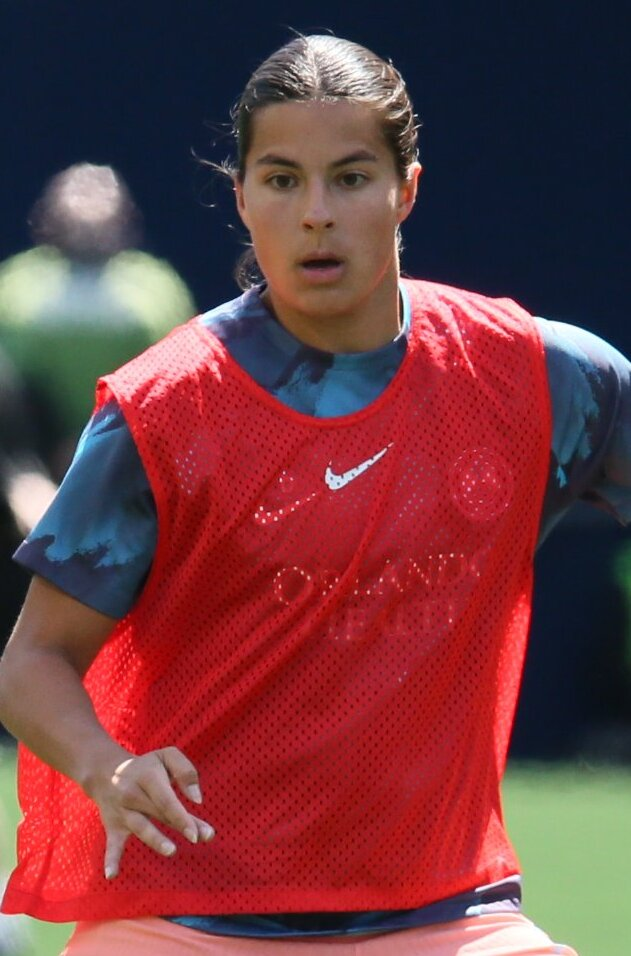
Sams with the Orlando Pride in 2024

On January 12, 2023, Sams was selected in the first round (third overall) of the 2023 NWSL Draft by Orlando Pride.

Sams recorded her first NWSL assist, to Barbra Banda, in a 1–0 win over Racing Louisville on May 5, 2024. She scored her first NWSL goal on May 19, opening a 3–2 win against the Seattle Reign. Her performance alongside center back partner Kylie Strom helped Orlando set the NWSL's record for consecutive games unbeaten and secure the NWSL Shield, the first trophy in Pride history. Sams was named to the NWSL Team of the Month three times, selected to the NWSL Best XI, and voted the NWSL Defender of the Year. On February 13, 2025, she signed a contract extension with the Pride through 2027.

=== Angel City FC ===
On January 9, 2026, Sams was traded to Angel City FC in exchange for $650,000 in intraleague transfer funds. Sams made her debut with Angel City on March 15, 2026 in the home opener against Chicago Stars. Sams recorded her first assist for Angel City on April 26, 2026, setting up Prisca Chilufya's stoppage-time goal in a 1–2 loss against the Portland Thorns.

== International career ==
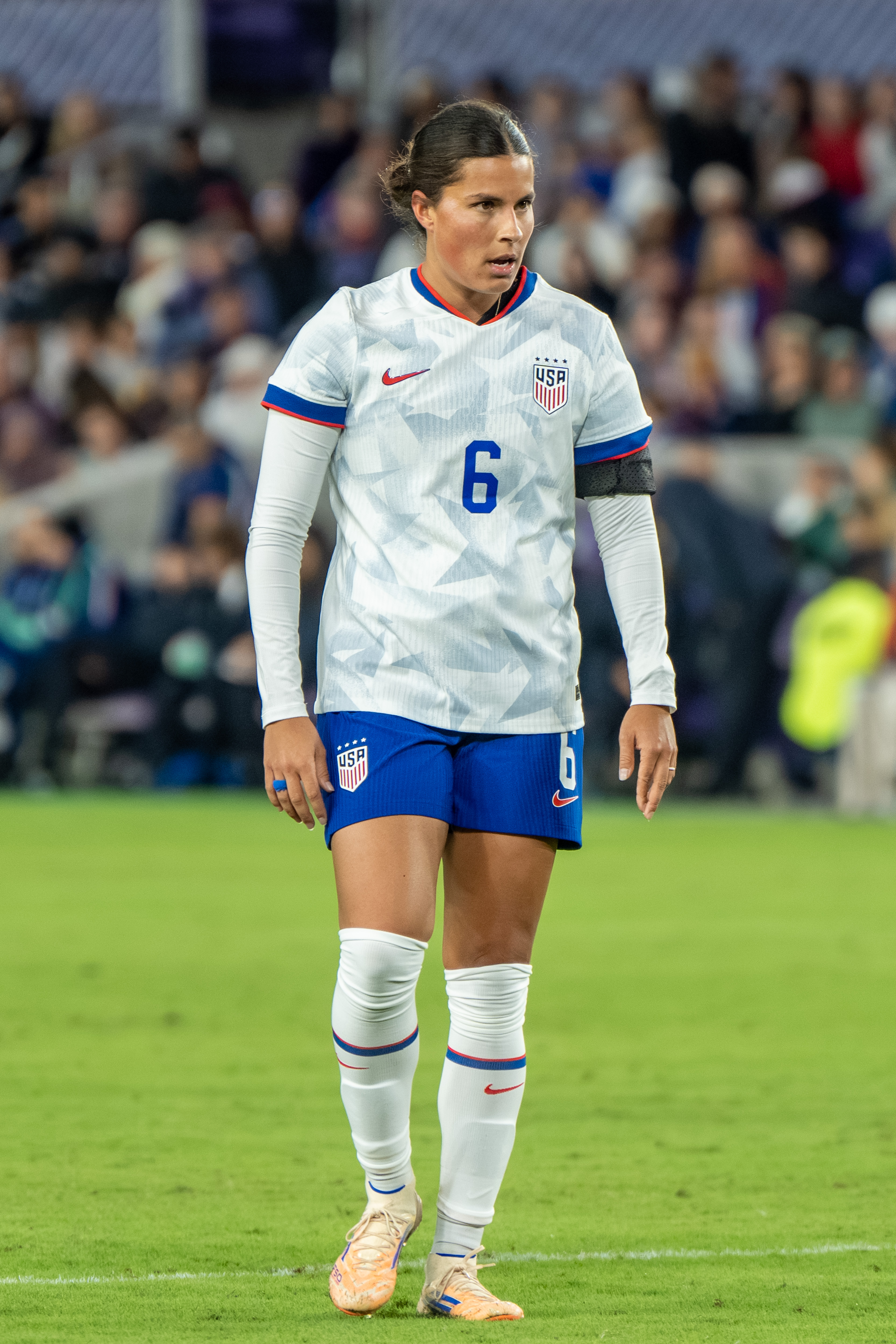
Sams with the United States in 2025

In March 2017, Sams was called into training camp with the United States under-19 team for the first time, one of only two college players on the roster. In January 2018, she was called up to an under-20 training camp ahead of the 2018 CONCACAF Women's U-20 Championship but did not make the final roster. In February 2022, she was named to the under-23 squad for the 2022 Thorns Invitational. She returned to the under-23s to play in the Three-Nations Tournament hosted in Sweden in June 2022.

In June 2024, Sams received her first senior national team call-up as a training player ahead of the send-off match for the 2024 Summer Olympics. The next month she was named as an alternate to the Olympic team after Lynn Williams came off the alternate list to replace Catarina Macario. She was named to the matchday squad for the final group stage game against Australia in place of the injured Tierna Davidson, and was again named in the 18 for the quarter-final against Japan, but was an unused substitute for both. Davidson returned for the semi-final. The United States won gold by defeating Brazil 1–0 in the final. Despite not playing in the Olympics or having made her international debut, Sams met the eligibility criteria for a medal by being named to a matchday squad.

She made her international debut on October 27, 2024, starting and playing the full 90 minutes of a 3–1 friendly victory over Iceland in Nashville.

On January 27, 2026, Sams captained the USWNT for the first time and scored her first international goal in a 5–0 friendly win over Chile.

== Personal life ==
Sams has a twin sister, Lizzy, who was a high school teammate with her at Navarre before playing college soccer at Daytona State College.

She married Dakota Sams on February 19, 2024.

== Career statistics ==
=== Club ===
As of May 2, 2026

Club	Season	League			National cup (Note: Includes Svenska Cupen, NWSL Challenge Cup)		Playoffs (Note: Includes NWSL playoffs)		Total	
Club	Season	Division	Apps	Goals	Apps	Goals	Apps	Goals	Apps	Goals
Racing Louisville FC	2022	USL W League	9	4	—		—		9	4
BK Häcken (loan)	2022	Damallsvenskan	4	1	1	0	—		5	1
Orlando Pride	2023	NWSL	22	0	5	0	—		27	0
Orlando Pride	2024	NWSL	25	1	—		3	0	28	1
Orlando Pride	2025	NWSL	25	0	3	0	2	0	31	0
Orlando Pride	Total		72	1	8	0	5	0	86	1
Angel City FC	2026	NWSL	6	1	—		—		6	1
Career total			91	7	9	0	5	0	106	7

=== International ===
As of match played April 14, 2026

National Team	Year	Apps	Goals
United States	2024	2	0
United States	2025	5	0
United States	2026	3	1
Total		10	1

List of international goals scored by Emily Sams
No.	Date	Venue	Opponent	Score	Result	Competition	Ref.
1	January 27, 2026	Santa Barbara, California, United States	Chile	3–0	5–0	Friendly	

== Honors ==
Florida State Seminoles

- Atlantic Coast Conference regular season: 2020
- Atlantic Coast Conference Tournament: 2020, 2021
- NCAA Women's College Cup: 2021

Orlando Pride

- NWSL Shield: 2024
- NWSL Championship: 2024
- NWSL Defender of the Year: 2024

United States

- Summer Olympic Games Gold Medal: 2024
- SheBelieves Cup: 2026

Individual

- United Soccer Coaches First Team All-America: 2021
- Atlantic Coast Conference Defensive Player of the Year: 2021
- NWSL Best XI First Team: 2024
