= Marciel =

Marciel is both a given name and a surname. Notable people with the name include:

- Marciel Rodger Back (born 1982), Brazilian footballer
- Marciel Silva da Silva (born 1995), Brazilian footballer
- Scot Marciel (born 1958), American diplomat

== See also ==
- Marcel (given name)
