= Evelyn Shores =

American soccer player (born 2004)

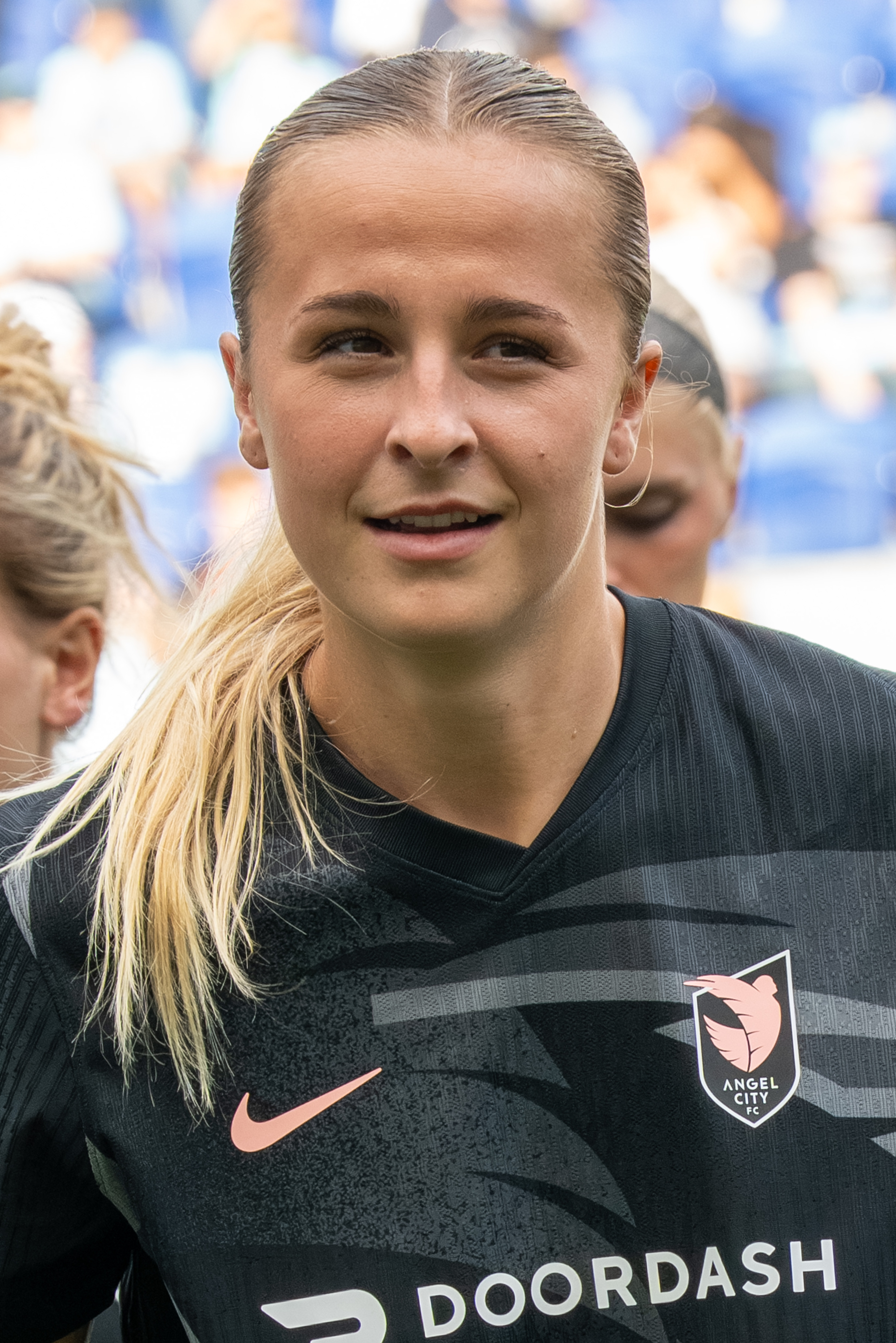
- Shores with Angel City FC in 2025

Personal information
- Date of birth: December 29, 2004 (age 21)
- Place of birth: Denver, Colorado, U.S.
- Height: 5 ft 9 in (1.75 m)
- Positions: Left back; midfielder

Team information
- Current team: Angel City
- Number: 15

Youth career
- 2009–2023: Tophat SC
- 2021–2023: Westminster Wildcats

College career
Years	Team	Apps	(Gls)
2023–2024	North Carolina Tar Heels	23	(5)

Senior career*
Years	Team	Apps	(Gls)
2025	North Carolina Courage U23	3	(0)
2025–	Angel City	40	(5)

International career^{‡}
2019	United States U-15	1	(0)
2022	United States U-20	2	(0)
2025–	United States U-23	5	(1)
- * Club domestic league appearances and goals as of 06:11, November 12, 2026 (UTC) ‡ National team caps and goals as of 14:08, March 8, 2026 (UTC)

Evelyn Shores (born December 29, 2004) is an American professional soccer player who plays as a left back for Angel City FC of the National Women's Soccer League (NWSL). She played college soccer for the North Carolina Tar Heels, winning the 2024 national championship. She has played for the United States at the youth international level.

== Early life ==
Shores was born in Denver, Colorado, to Debbie and Steven Shores, and has two older siblings. After her family moved to Atlanta, Georgia, she began playing soccer for Tophat SC at age four. She stayed with the club through high school while playing two or three age groups up. She played high school soccer and basketball at the Westminster Schools in Atlanta. She helped Westminster win three consecutive state championships and was named a Just Women's Sports All-American after recording 27 goals and 24 assists in her senior year. She was ranked by TopDrawerSoccer as the seventh-best prospect in the class of 2023, part of North Carolina's top-ranked recruiting class.

== College career ==
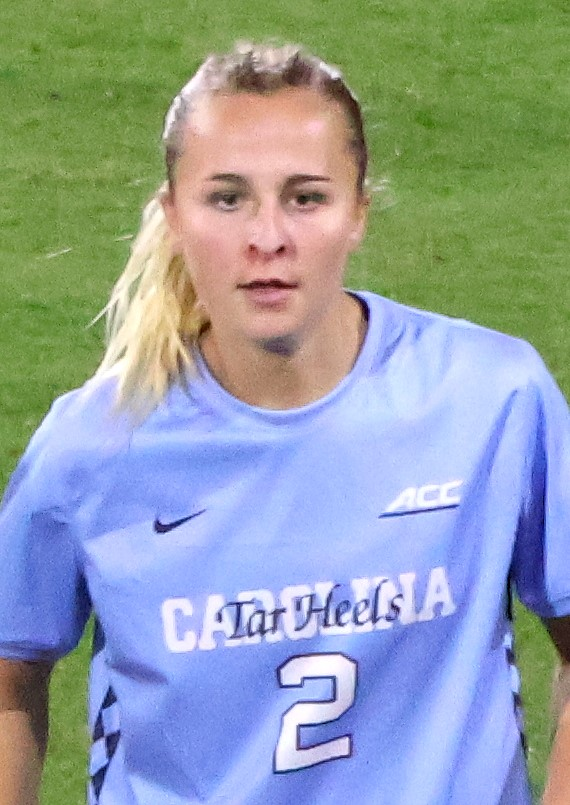
Shores playing for North Carolina in 2024

Shores made 13 appearances, starting 6, for the North Carolina Tar Heels as a freshman in 2023. She missed the second half of the season after tearing her anterior cruciate ligament (ACL) during the game against Wake Forest. She had recorded 4 goals and 3 assists and was named to the ACC all-freshman team. After missing the start of her sophomore year in 2024, she returned for the last 10 games of the season, coming off the bench and scoring one goal during the NCAA tournament as North Carolina won its 23rd national title and first since 2012. The summer after her sophomore year, she played for the North Carolina Courage U23 in the USL W League and the US Women–sponsored team at the Soccer Tournament 2025, scoring the winning goal in the US$1 million final (though she could not share in the prize money due to NCAA rules).

== Club career ==
Shores with Angel City FC in 2026

Angel City FC announced on July 10, 2025, that they had signed Shores to her first professional contract on a three-and-a-half-year deal. She had spoken with multiple NWSL clubs before visiting Angel City and deciding to give up her remaining college eligibility shortly before the fall semester. She made her professional debut in Angel City's return from the summer break, starting in a 2–0 loss to the Seattle Reign. On September 18, she scored her first professional goal from Gisele Thompson's cross to open the scoring in a 2–2 draw with the Washington Spirit.

On March 15, 2026, Shores began the season scoring a header from Kennedy Fuller's corner kick in a 4–0 win over the Chicago Stars. The following week, she made her first professional assist to Sveindís Jane Jónsdóttir in a 3–1 victory over Bay FC as her team fielded the youngest winning lineup in NWSL history. On September 5, she scored both goals in a 2–0 victory over Racing Louisville, her first career brace. She finished the season with a club record 8 assists and scored 4 goals as Angel City made the playoffs for the second time in club history, losing 1–0 to the Kansas City Current in the quarterfinals.

== International career ==
Shores began training with the United States youth national team at the under-14 level in 2017. The next year, she helped the under-15 team win the 2018 CONCACAF Girls' U-15 Championship. She subsequently trained at the under-16 and under-17 level before the youth national team program went on hiatus during the COVID-19 pandemic. She helped the under-20 team win the title at the 2022 Sud Ladies Cup but was not selected to the final roster for the 2022 FIFA U-20 Women's World Cup.

Shores was called into training camp with the under-23 team, practicing alongside the senior national team, in March 2025. In June 2025, as the only college player in the under-23 squad, she scored the 2–1 stoppage-time winner in a friendly against Germany. In September 2026, she was called into the full national team for the first time by head coach Emma Hayes.

== Career statistics ==
As of May 2, 2026

Appearances and goals by club, season and competition
Club	Season	League			Playoffs		Total	
Club	Season	Division	Apps	Goals	Apps	Goals	Apps	Goals
Angel City FC	2025	NWSL	12	1	—		12	1
Angel City FC	2026	NWSL	6	1	—		6	1
Career total			18	2	0	0	18	2

== Honors and awards ==
North Carolina Tar Heels

- NCAA Division I women's soccer tournament: 2024

United States U-15

- CONCACAF Girls' U-15 Championship: 2018

United States U-20

- Sud Ladies Cup: 2022

Individual

- ACC all-freshman team: 2023
- NWSL Best XI Second Team: 2026
