= Itapiranga, Santa Catarina =

Itapiranga
- Municipality
- The Municipality of Itapiranga
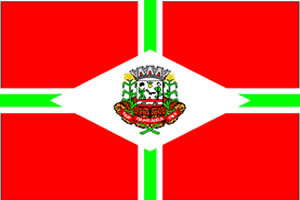
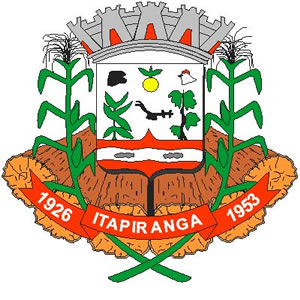
- Flag Coat of arms
- Nickname: "Itapira"
- Location of Itapiranga
- Coordinates: 27°10′08″S 53°42′43″W
- Country: Brazil
- Region: South
- State: Santa Catarina
- Founded: December 30, 1953

Government
  - Mayor: Vunibaldo Rech (PT)

Area
  - Total: 280.116 km^{2} (108.153 sq mi)
- Elevation: 206 m (676 ft)

Population (2020)
  - Total: 17,007
  - Density: 47.1/km^{2} (122/sq mi)
- Time zone: UTC-3 (UTC-3)
  - Summer (DST): UTC-2 (UTC-2)
- HDI (2000): 0.832 – high

Itapiranga is the westernmost municipality in the Brazilian state of Santa Catarina.

== Minority language ==
Itapiranga was initially settled around 1920 by German speakers from what was known in German as the Altkolonie, or the eastern region of Rio Grande do Sul where immigrants from the Hunsrück and other regions of Germany had started to establish themselves starting in 1824. Therefore, the primary language in this area was Riograndenser Hunsrückisch for many years; however, since the 1960s the Portuguese language, Brazil's national language, has gained preference amongst most inhabitants. Itapiranga shares a similar history with many towns in the northwest of Rio Grande do Sul, where the same migratory patterns occurred. In the recent years there is an increasing effort to preserve the local minority Brazil's minority languages.

The Brazilian linguist Cléo Vilson Altenhofen was born and grew up in Harmonia, Rio Grande do Sul; he is a native speaker of Riograndenser Hunsrückisch. As such, he co-wrote together with linguist Jaqueline Frey, also a native speaker of this dialect and a native to Itapirange, Santa Catarina, and he personally delivered a historic speech before congress in Brasília, revindicating better minority language public policies for the country. Here is a section of that original text: In mein Gemeind in Itapiranga, Santa Catarina, hott’s eenfach net die Chance gebb, in de Schul Deitsch se lenne - ich menne hiemit Hochdeitsch ... (Translation: In my community in Itapiranga, Santa Catarina, there was no opportunity to learn German - by that I mean High German).

== Climate ==
Climate data for Itapiranga, Santa Catarina, elevation 200 m (660 ft), (1976–2005)
Month	Jan	Feb	Mar	Apr	May	Jun	Jul	Aug	Sep	Oct	Nov	Dec	Year
Record high °C (°F)	39.5 (103.1)	38.0 (100.4)	37.4 (99.3)	35.0 (95.0)	35.2 (95.4)	30.6 (87.1)	31.8 (89.2)	36.0 (96.8)	37.2 (99.0)	38.2 (100.8)	38.2 (100.8)	40.0 (104.0)	40.0 (104.0)
Mean daily maximum °C (°F)	29.4 (84.9)	29.0 (84.2)	28.1 (82.6)	25.4 (77.7)	21.5 (70.7)	19.1 (66.4)	19.1 (66.4)	21.2 (70.2)	21.8 (71.2)	23.9 (75.0)	26.7 (80.1)	28.9 (84.0)	24.5 (76.1)
Daily mean °C (°F)	25.3 (77.5)	24.1 (75.4)	23.0 (73.4)	20.2 (68.4)	16.3 (61.3)	14.4 (57.9)	14.3 (57.7)	16.0 (60.8)	17.7 (63.9)	20.5 (68.9)	22.8 (73.0)	24.9 (76.8)	20.0 (67.9)
Mean daily minimum °C (°F)	19.5 (67.1)	18.8 (65.8)	17.8 (64.0)	15.6 (60.1)	12.1 (53.8)	10.4 (50.7)	8.6 (47.5)	10.3 (50.5)	12.3 (54.1)	15.2 (59.4)	16.6 (61.9)	18.6 (65.5)	14.6 (58.4)
Record low °C (°F)	10.2 (50.4)	8.4 (47.1)	6.0 (42.8)	2.4 (36.3)	−0.8 (30.6)	−2.0 (28.4)	−3.4 (25.9)	−3.0 (26.6)	4.0 (39.2)	4.5 (40.1)	6.0 (42.8)	7.2 (45.0)	−3.4 (25.9)
Average precipitation mm (inches)	165.0 (6.50)	151.0 (5.94)	140.0 (5.51)	143.0 (5.63)	168.0 (6.61)	161.0 (6.34)	148.0 (5.83)	104.0 (4.09)	179.0 (7.05)	237.0 (9.33)	181.0 (7.13)	189.0 (7.44)	1,966 (77.4)
Average relative humidity (%)	76	81	82	83	87	88	84	81	79	79	74	73	81
Mean monthly sunshine hours	238	193	220	172	161	141	168	186	162	192	243	243	2,319
Source 1: Empresa Brasileira de Pesquisa Agropecuária (EMBRAPA)
Source 2: Climatempo (precipitation)

== Notable people ==
- Marciel Rodger Back, footballer
- Maiara Niehues, footballer
