= Carina Lageyre =

American soccer player (born 2003)

- Lageyre with Angel City FC in 2026

Personal information
- Full name: Carina Rose Lageyre
- Date of birth: November 1, 2003 (age 23)
- Height: 5 ft 7 in (1.70 m)
- Position: Midfielder

Team information
- Current team: Angel City
- Number: 16

College career
Years	Team	Apps	(Gls)
2022–2025	Duke Blue Devils	65	(6)

Senior career*
Years	Team	Apps	(Gls)
2026–	Angel City	25	(0)

International career
2018	United States U-15		
2019–2020	United States U-17		
2022	United States U-20	6	(0)
- * Club domestic league appearances and goals as of 06:01, November 12, 2026 (UTC)

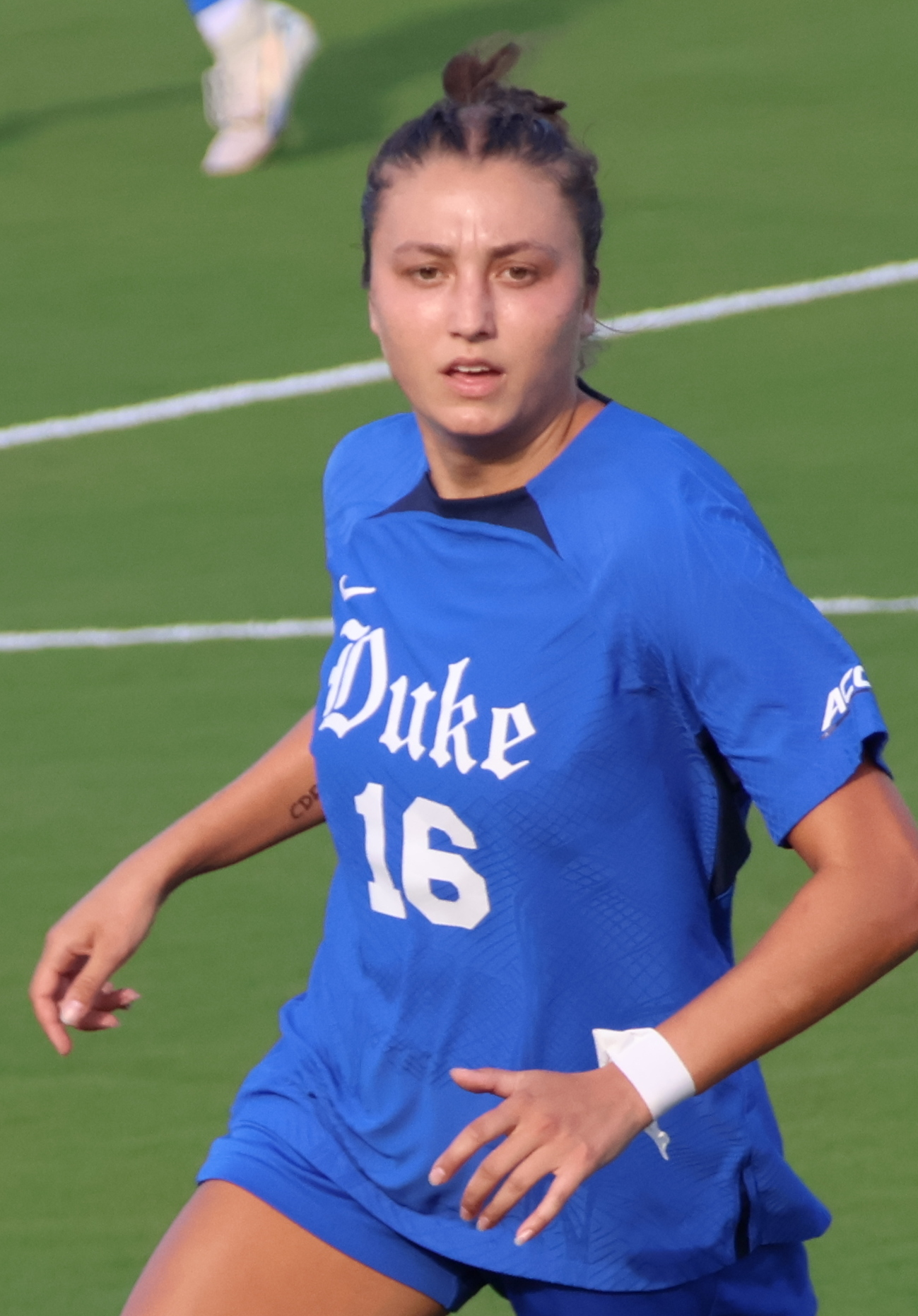
Lageyre with Duke in 2025

Carina Rose Lageyre (born November 1, 2003) is an American professional soccer player who plays as a midfielder for Angel City FC of the National Women's Soccer League (NWSL). She played college soccer for the Duke Blue Devils. She represented the United States at the 2022 FIFA U-20 Women's World Cup.

== Early life ==
Lageyre grew up in Cooper City, Florida, the daughter of Juan and Mercedes Lageyre, and has two sisters. She began playing soccer at age three. She started out with Cooper City Optimist and Davie United SC before moving to Development Academy club Weston FC. She committed to play college soccer for Duke during her freshman year at Cooper City High School. TopDrawerSoccer ranked her as the 4th-best prospect nationally in the 2022 class.

== College career ==
Lageyre played in 7 games, starting 1, for the Duke Blue Devils as a freshman in 2022, being limited by a hamstring injury she picked up at the 2022 FIFA U-20 Women's World Cup. She started 15 games and scored 2 goals with 4 assists as a sophomore in 2023, but saw the team miss the NCAA tournament. She started 21 games in her junior year in 2024, scoring 2 goals with 6 assists, as the Blue Devils won the Atlantic Coast Conference (ACC) regular-season title. Duke earned a one seed in the NCAA tournament and reached the semifinals, losing to North Carolina. She started 22 games and scored 2 goals with 2 assists in her senior year in 2025, earning third-team All-ACC honors. She again helped the team to the NCAA tournament semifinals, losing to Stanford. Her teammate Kat Rader said Lageyre "doesn't always get the recognition she deserves, but she is probably the most consistent player on our team".

== Club career ==
Angel City FC announced on January 7, 2026, that they had signed Lageyre to her first professional contract on a three-year deal. She made her professional debut as a late substitute for Maiara Niehues in a season-opening 4–0 victory over the Chicago Stars on March 15.

== International career ==
Lageyre began training with the United States under-15 team in 2017. In 2019, she helped the under-17 team win the UEFA Development Tournament in the Czech Republic. After winning the 2022 Sud Ladies Cup with the under-20 team, she made the roster for the 2022 FIFA U-20 Women's World Cup in Costa Rica, playing in two games as the United States was eliminated in the group stage.

== Honors and awards ==
Duke Blue Devils

- Atlantic Coast Conference: 2024

United States U-20

- Sud Ladies Cup: 2022

Individual

- Third-team All-ACC: 2025
