= Casey Phair =

South Korean footballer (born 2007)

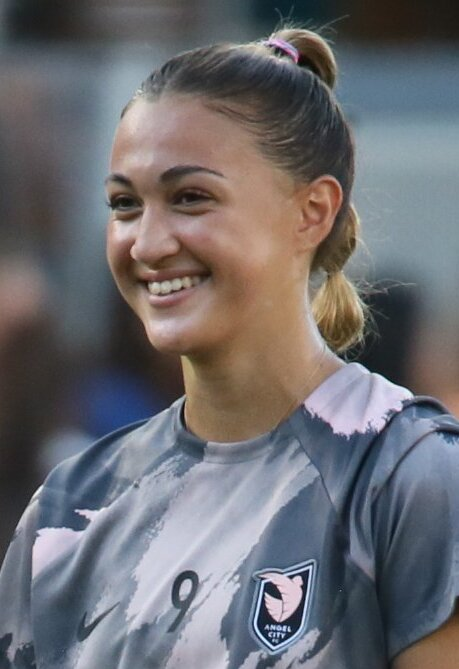
- Phair with Angel City in 2024

Personal information
- Full name: Casey Yu-Jin Phair
- Date of birth: 29 June 2007 (age 19)
- Place of birth: Anyang, Gyeonggi, South Korea
- Height: 5 ft 10 in (1.78 m)
- Position: Striker

Team information
- Current team: Feyenoord
- Number: 27

Youth career
- PDA

Senior career*
Years	Team	Apps	(Gls)
2024–2026	Angel City	13	(0)
2025	→ Djurgården (loan)	12	(0)
2026–	Feyenoord	0	(0)

International career^{‡}
2023–2024	South Korea U-17	9	(8)
2023–	South Korea	24	(5)
Medal record
AFC U-17 Women's Asian Cup
Bronze medal – third place	2024 Indonesia
- * Club domestic league appearances and goals as of 17 August 2026 ‡ National team caps and goals as of 23:45, 18 April 2026 (UTC)

Casey Yu-Jin Phair (Korean: 케이시 유진 페어; born 29 June 2007) is a South Korean professional footballer who plays as a striker for Vrouwen Eredivisie club Feyenoord and the South Korea national team. Phair is the youngest player to feature in a FIFA Women's World Cup, having made her debut at 16 years and 26 days old in 2023. A Korean American raised in the United States, she was the first multiracial footballer to play for South Korea at a World Cup. She began her professional career with the National Women's Soccer League (NWSL)'s Angel City FC in 2024.

== Early life ==
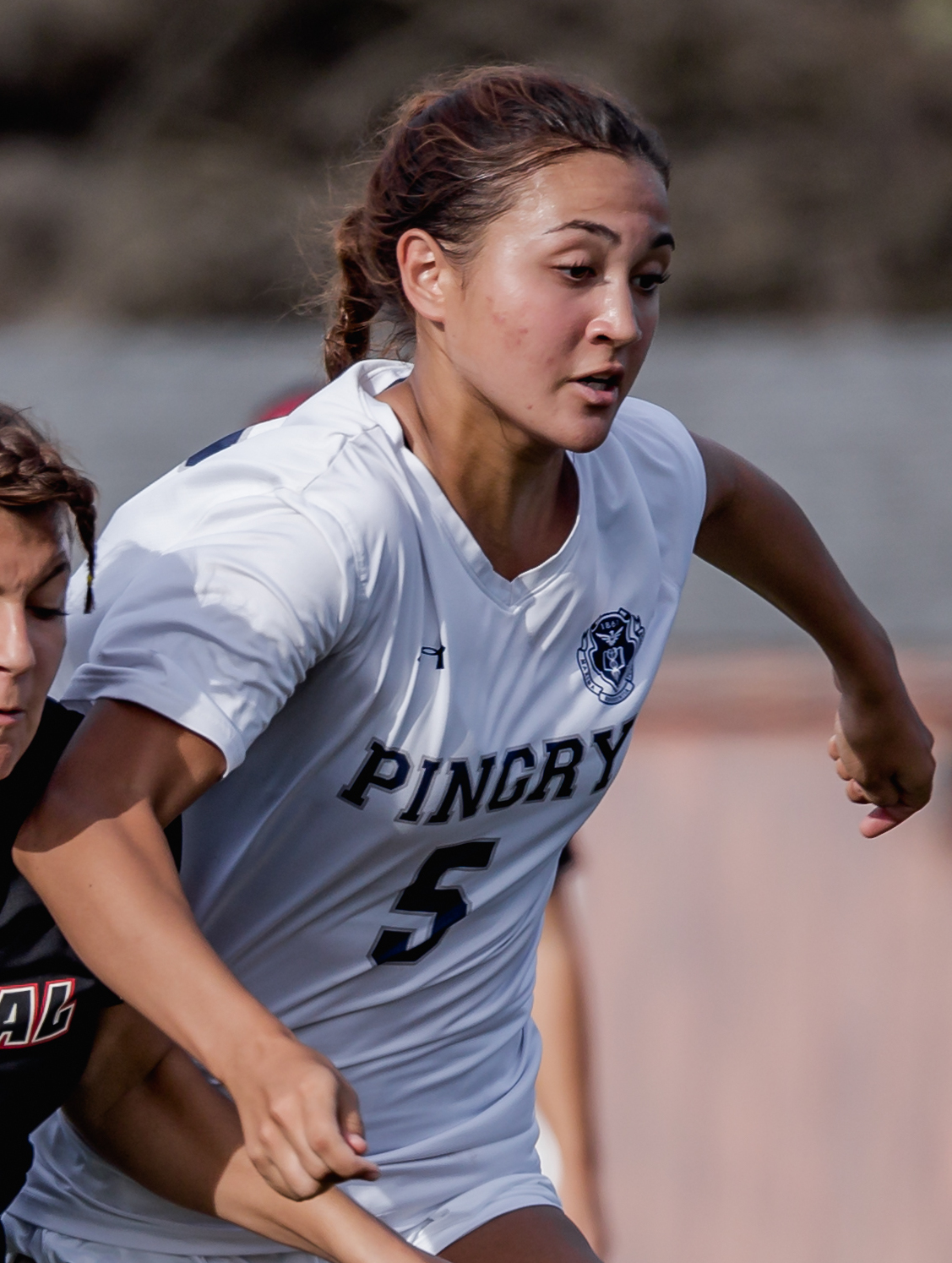
Phair playing for the Pingry School in 2022

Phair was born in South Korea to an American father and South Korean mother. Her family moved to the United States when she was one month old. Formerly residing in Exeter, New Hampshire, she then moved to Warren Township, New Jersey, where she played soccer at the Pingry School and trained at the Players Development Academy (PDA) in New Jersey. She played one season for the Pingry School as a freshman in 2022, scoring 25 goals in 15 games and earning first-team all-conference honors. In 2023, recognizing her performance for PDA in the ECNL, she was named her ECNL conference player of the year and tabbed ECNL All-American.

== Club career ==
=== Angel City ===
Following her strong performance at the 2023 FIFA Women's World Cup, Phair trialed with local NWSL club NJ/NY Gotham FC and fellow league clubs Kansas City Current and Angel City FC. On 18 January 2024, Angel City announced that the club had signed Phair to her first professional contract on a three-year deal under the NWSL Under-18 Entry Mechanism. She was the youngest player to sign with the club. On 26 July, she made her professional debut in the NWSL x Liga MX Femenil Summer Cup, coming on as a second-half substitute for Messiah Bright in a 2–0 win over Bay FC.

On 22 February 2025, Phair scored her first goal for Angel City in the preseason Coachella Valley Invitational, heading a late 1–1 equalizer against the Seattle Reign FC. On 18 April, she made her NWSL regular-season debut against Gotham FC, replacing Riley Tiernan in a 4–0 loss to the eventual champions. On 21 July, Angel City announced that Phair had signed a three-year contract extension with the club.

The same day, Phair was loaned out to Swedish club Djurgården for the rest of the year. She debuted for the club on 9 August 2025, coming on for Urara Watanabe in a 4–0 defeat to eventual champions BK Häcken. She made 12 appearances for the club, including one start in a 2–1 win over Brommapojkarna.

On 20 May 2026, Phair made her first career NWSL regular-season start, playing 82 minutes in Angel City's 2–1 victory over the Kansas City Current. Her head coach Alexander Straus said she "worked really, really hard ... She does a lot of the work that is not that recognized, but we recognize it". During her two and a half years in Los Angeles, she made 14 appearances in all competitions.

=== Feyenoord ===
On 18 August 2026, Phair was sold to Dutch club Feyenoord for an undisclosed transfer fee, signing a three-year contract.

== International career ==
Phair was called up to the United States under-15 team in March 2022. She also played for the South Korea under-17 team before she was called up to the senior team for the 2023 FIFA Women's World Cup. She helped the under-17 team qualify for the 2024 AFC U-17 Women's Asian Cup, scoring two goals against Tajikistan and three goals against Hong Kong.

At the 2023 Women's World Cup, Phair became the youngest player to ever appear in a senior World Cup— men's or women's— at the age of 16 years and 26 days, coming on as a substitute in South Korea's opening game against Colombia on 25 July 2023; the distinction had been previously held by Ifeanyi Chiejine. In the process, she also became the youngest footballer to have reportedly won a cap for a women's senior national team, a record that was later broken by Una Rankić in September of the same year. She was also the first multiracial player to represent South Korea at a World Cup. Phair played in all three of South Korea's group stage matches and went on to make her first start in the team's final match against Germany, which ended in a 1–1 draw.

On 26 October 2023, Phair scored her first senior goal, as well as her first hat-trick, in a 10–1 win over Thailand in the second round of the 2024 AFC Women's Olympic Qualifying Tournament: in the process, at 16 years and 119 days of age, she became the second youngest goalscorer in the history of the South Korean women's senior national team, behind only Ji So-yun. She also became the youngest player to ever score a hat-trick for any South Korean national team, in men's or women's football.

On 10 October 2024, Phair was named to the South Korea under-17 roster for the 2024 FIFA U-17 Women's World Cup.

== Career statistics ==
=== Club ===
As of match played 23 May 2026

Appearances and goals by club, season and competition
Club	Season	League			Cup		Playoffs (Note: Includes NWSL Playoffs.)		Total	
Club	Season	Division	Apps	Goals	Apps	Goals	Apps	Goals	Apps	Goals
Angel City FC	2024	NWSL	0	0	1	0	–		1	0
Angel City FC	2025	NWSL	5	0	–		–		5	0
Angel City FC	2026	NWSL	5	0	–		–		5	0
Djurgården (loan)	2025	Damallsvenskan	6	0	–		–		6	0
Career total			16	0	1	0	0	0	17	0

=== International ===
As of match played 18 April 2026

Appearances and goals by national team and year
National team	Year	Apps	Goals
South Korea	2023	6	3
South Korea	2024	6	1
South Korea	2025	7	0
South Korea	2026	5	1
Total		24	5

Scores and results list South Korea's goal tally first, score column indicates score after each Phair goal.

List of international goals scored by Casey Phair
No.	Date	Venue	Opponent	Score	Result	Competition	Ref.
1	26 October 2023	Xiamen Egret Stadium, Xiamen, China	Thailand	1–0	10–1	2024 AFC Women's Olympic Qualifying Tournament	
2	26 October 2023	Xiamen Egret Stadium, Xiamen, China	Thailand	6–0	10–1	2024 AFC Women's Olympic Qualifying Tournament	
3	26 October 2023	Xiamen Egret Stadium, Xiamen, China	Thailand	7–0	10–1	2024 AFC Women's Olympic Qualifying Tournament	
4	24 February 2024	Cidade do Futebol, Oeiras, Portugal	Czech Republic	2–0	2–1	Friendly	
5	18 April 2026	Arena Pantanal, Cuiabá, Brazil	Zambia	1–1	1–1	2026 FIFA Series	
