= Faith Nguyen =

American soccer player (born 2003)

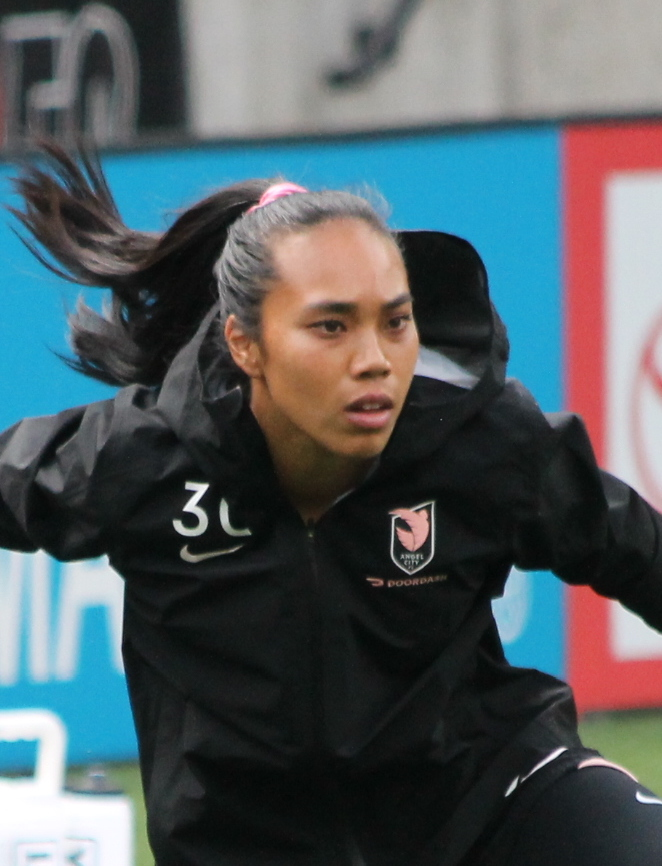
- Nguyen with Angel City in 2026

Personal information
- Full name: Faith Hoang Anh Nguyen
- Date of birth: November 16, 2003 (age 22)
- Place of birth: Fountain Valley, California, U.S.
- Height: 5 ft 7 in (1.70 m)
- Position: Goalkeeper

Team information
- Current team: Angel City
- Number: 30

Youth career
- SoCal Blues

College career
Years	Team	Apps	(Gls)
2021–2023	UCLA Bruins	4	(0)
2024–2025	Texas Tech Red Raiders	41	(0)

Senior career*
Years	Team	Apps	(Gls)
2025	FC Olympia	7	(0)
2026–	Angel City	0	(0)
- * Club domestic league appearances and goals as of 02:17, March 31, 2026 (UTC)

Faith Hoang Anh Nguyen (born November 16, 2003) is an American professional soccer player who plays as a goalkeeper for Angel City FC of the National Women's Soccer League (NWSL). She played college soccer for the UCLA Bruins, winning the 2022 national championship, and the Texas Tech Red Raiders.

== Early life ==
Born in Fountain Valley, California, to Hanh and Alex Nguyen, Nguyen grew up in the nearby neighborhood of Costa Mesa. She played club soccer for the SoCal Blues, captaining the team and winning two league titles. She helped the Blues record a 29-match unbeaten streak, the highest in program history. Nguyen attended Mater Dei High School, a private Catholic school in Santa Ana. She graduated from Mater Dei early to enroll at UCLA in the spring of 2021.

== College career ==
=== UCLA Bruins ===
Nguyen was a backup goalkeeper in all three of her seasons with the UCLA Bruins. After failing to earn any playing time as a freshman, she made her collegiate debut on August 25, 2022, with Nguyen and all three other of the Bruins' goalies earning a portion of minutes in a 6–0 victory over Cal State Northridge. She looked on from the bench as UCLA went on to win the 2022 national championship, beating North Carolina in double overtime. As a junior in 2023, Nguyen made 3 appearances, keeping a clean sheet in each match. She played a career-high 27 minutes against Oregon State in October 2023. She departed from UCLA having contributed to two Pac-12 conference championships along with the national title.

=== Texas Tech Red Raiders ===
Ahead of the 2024 season, Nguyen transferred to Texas Tech University. She cemented herself as the Red Raiders' starting goalkeeper, missing only 2 of Texas Tech's 22 games due to injury. She was named to the All-Big 12 first team at the end of the year after having recorded 10 clean sheets and 61 total saves, including a penalty kick save against West Virginia in October 2024. She received two Big 12 Goalkeeper of the Week honors, with her first one coming at the tail end of 3 straight shutouts in conference play. She helped Texas Tech reach the NCAA tournament and made 9 saves in the Red Raiders' second-round defeat to top-ranked Duke.

In the offseason after her first year at Texas Tech, Nguyen played for FC Olympia of the pre-professional USL W League. She captained the team to the W League national playoffs after FC Olympia finished atop the Northwest Conference. At the end of the season, Nguyen was selected as the team's most valuable player.

Nguyen returned to Texas Tech for a second season in 2025. She started all 21 games for the Red Raiders, posted a career-best goals against average, and was named to the All-Big 12 second team. In the NCAA tournament, she saved Linda Ullmark's penalty shootout attempt, but conceded all 4 other spot-kicks as Texas Tech lost its Round of 32 match to reigning champions North Carolina on penalties. Nguyen ended her Texas Tech tenure with a career goals against average of 0.83 that ranked as fourth-lowest in program history. Despite only playing two seasons for the Red Raiders, she also ranked tenth in all-time program saves, with 127.

== Club career ==
In the summer of 2025, Nguyen returned home to Southern California to train with Angel City FC of the National Women's Soccer League. After graduating from college half a year later, Nguyen was announced to have signed her first professional contract with Angel City on January 14, 2026, penning a six-month deal with the club. The club later signed Nguyen to a contract extension through the end of the 2026 season.

== International career ==
Nguyen was invited to attend virtual meetings with the United States under-19 national team in April 2021.

== Honors and awards ==
UCLA Bruins

- NCAA Division I tournament: 2022
- Pac-12 Conference: 2021, 2023

Individual

- First-team All-Big 12: 2024
- Second-team All-Big 12: 2025
