= Marciel (footballer, born 1982) =

Brazilian footballer

Marciel Rodger Back
Personal information
- Date of birth: 20 March 1982 (age 44)
- Place of birth: Itapiranga, SC, Brazil
- Height: 1.78 m (5 ft 10 in)
- Position: Midfielder

Team information
- Current team: Americano

Youth career
- Fluminense

Senior career*
Years	Team	Apps	(Gls)
2002–2004	Fluminense	60	(0)
2005	Inter Limeira		
2005	Vasco da Gama		
2005–2008	Samsunspor	46	(0)
2008–2009	Bréscia RJ		
2009–2011	Macaé		
2011	Americano		
2012	RoPS	0	(0)
- * Club domestic league appearances and goals

Marciel Rodger Back also known as Marciel (born 20 March 1982 in Itapiranga, Santa Catarina) is a Brazilian professional footballer who plays for Americano Futebol Clube.

Marciel last played for Samsunspor in the Turkish Super Lig.
