= Maiara Niehues =

Brazilian footballer (born 2004)

- Niehues with Angel City in 2025

Personal information
- Full name: Maiara Carolina Niehues
- Date of birth: 11 August 2004 (age 22)
- Place of birth: Itapiranga, Brazil
- Height: 1.76 m (5 ft 9 in)
- Position: Midfielder

Team information
- Current team: Angel City
- Number: 12

Youth career
- 2019: Chapecoense
- 2020: Iranduba
- 2020–2022: Internacional

Senior career*
Years	Team	Apps	(Gls)
2019–2020	Chapecoense	6	(0)
2021–2022	Internacional	26	(2)
2022–2025	Sporting CP	21	(7)
2025–	Angel City	37	(11)

International career^{‡}
2024	Brazil U-20	2	(2)
2026–	Brazil	4	(0)
- * Club domestic league appearances and goals as of 06:10, 12 November 2026 (UTC) ‡ National team caps and goals as of 19 April 2026

Maiara Carolina Niehues (born 11 August 2004) is a Brazilian professional footballer who plays as a midfielder for Angel City FC of the National Women's Soccer League (NWSL) and the Brazil national team.

== Club career ==
=== Early career ===
Born in Itapiranga, Santa Catarina, Niehues began her career with Chapecoense, where she managed to play for the first team at the age of 15. After leaving in the following year, she spent a short period at Iranduba. She then played for Internacional, appearing in matches for their senior, under-20, under-18, under-17, and under-16 teams from 2020 to 2022. She compiled a combined eight goals and four assists in all competitions while helping the club's under-20 section to a 2022 National Championship appearance.

=== Sporting CP ===
Niehues joined Portuguese club Sporting CP in September 2022. During her time at Sporting, she appeared in 57 matches in all competitions, scoring 18 goals and three assists in 3,214 minutes on the pitch.

=== Angel City ===
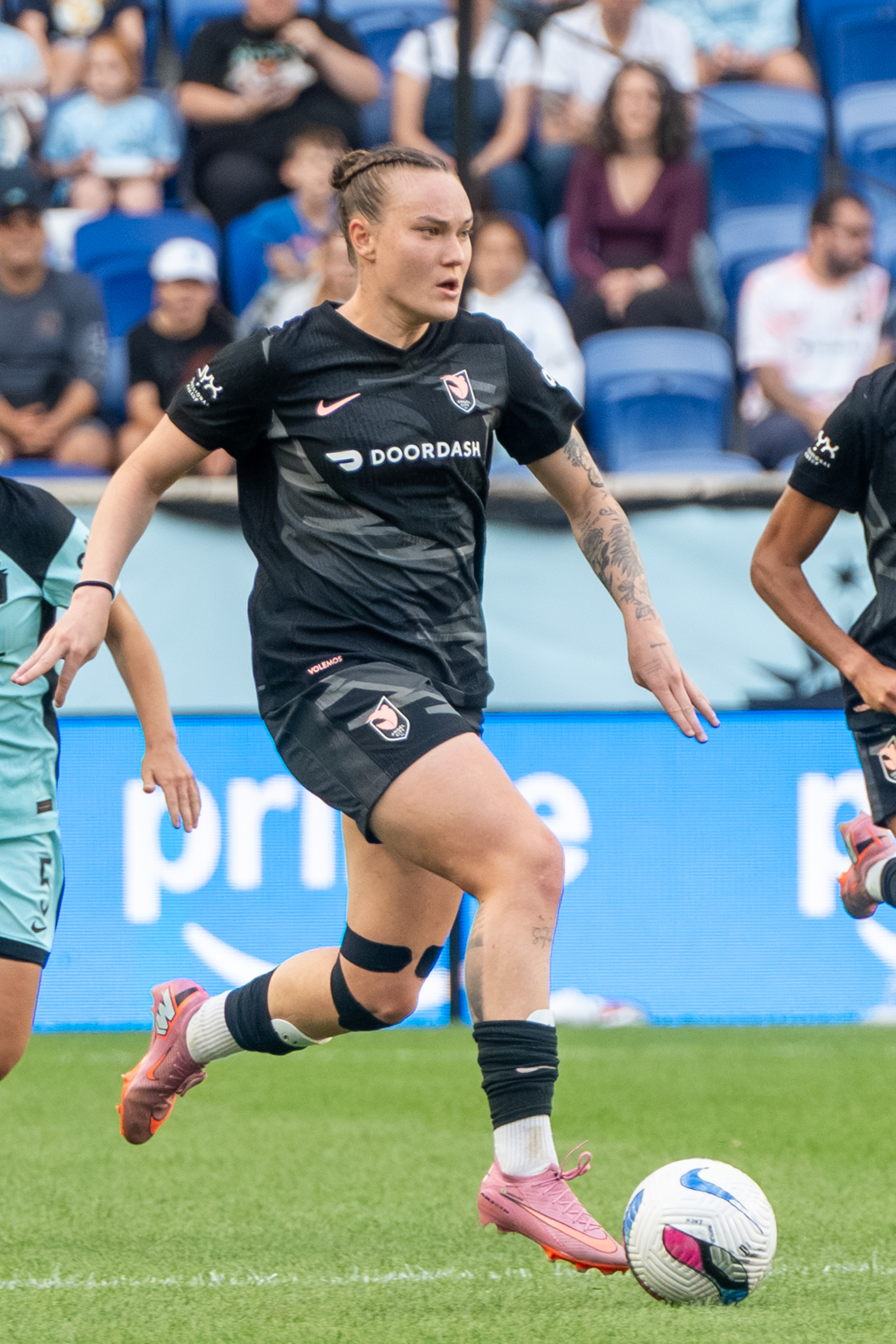
Niehues playing for Angel City in 2025

In March 2025, Niehues joined the National Women's Soccer League (NWSL)'s Angel City FC for an undisclosed transfer fee, signing a three-year contract. On 1 September, she scored her first goal of the club, the 2–1 game-winner over Bay FC.

On 15 March 2026, Niehues scored the last goal in Angel City's season opener against the Chicago Stars, capping off a 4–0 victory. On 2 May, she received the first red card in Angel City history for striking Utah Royals player Cloé Lacasse. She was given an additional one-match suspension by the league. On 18 July, she became the second-youngest NWSL player to score in five consecutive matches, during a 2–0 win over the Chicago Stars. On 26 September, she came off the bench to score the 1–0 winner against the Washington Spirit, breaking the club record for goals in a season with nine.

== International career ==
Niehues represented Brazil at the 2024 FIFA U-20 Women's World Cup. She had an unfortunate senior international debut as she was sent off in the 33rd minute after committing two bookable offenses against Venezuela as Brazil lost the friendly 2–1 on 4 March 2026.

== Honors ==
Sporting CP

- Supertaça de Portugal Feminina: 2024
