= Prisca Chilufya =

Zambian footballer (born 1999)

- Chilufya with Angel City in 2026

Personal information
- Date of birth: 8 June 1999 (age 27)
- Place of birth: Kitwe, Zambia
- Height: 1.67 m (5 ft 6 in)
- Position: Forward

Team information
- Current team: Angel City FC
- Number: 24

Senior career*
Years	Team	Apps	(Gls)
–2020	Red Arrows		
2021	BIIK Kazygurt		
2022	Tomiris-Turan		
2023	Fatih Karagümrük	7	(4)
2023–2025	Juárez	48	(14)
2025	Orlando Pride	16	(2)
2025–	Angel City FC	27	(5)

International career
2018–	Zambia		
- * Club domestic league appearances and goals as of 05:58, 12 November 2026 (UTC)

Prisca Chilufya (born 8 June 1999) is a Zambian women's professional footballer who plays as a Forward for Angel City FC in the National Women's Soccer League and Zambia women's national team.

== Club career ==
Prisca Chilufya with Angel City FC in 2026

Chilufya has played for Red Arrows. She was signed from Arrows to BIIK Kazygurt on a two-year deal in 2021, where she joined her Zambia teammate Racheal Kundananji. She featured in both of Kazygurt's games versus Bayern Munich in the 2020-1 UEFA Women's Champions League, in which they lost 9–1 on aggregate.

She remained in the Kazakhstan Women's Football Championship for the beginning of the 2022/23 season with Tomiris Turan. She scored a double hat-trick and two assists in a single match in which Tomirus Turan beat Sdyusshor 10–1.

Chilufya then returned to the Red Arrows for the remainder of the 2022/23 season where she scored 10 goals in 16 games. She then had a brief spell at Fatih Karagumruk.

She signed a two-year contract with FC Juarez in summer 2023.

Chilufya was acquired by the Orlando Pride, an NWSL team, on an immediate transfer. She signed a three-year contract, keeping her in Orlando through the 2027 season. Chilufya made her Pride debut as a substitute in the 2025 NWSL Challenge Cup, which was a defeat to the Washington Spirit on penalties.

Chilufya was traded to Angel City FC on October 9, 2025 for $50,000 in 2025 intraleague transfer funds and a 2025 international roster spot.

== International career ==
Chilufya has been regularly called up for Zambia at senior level since she featured in the 2018 Women's Africa Cup of Nations and qualifiers for the Tokyo Olympics in 2018.

She played for Zambia at the 2020 COSAFA Women's Championship. She was left out of the Zambia squad's for both the 2020 Tokyo Olympics and 2022 Women's Africa Cup of Nations squad because of gender eligibility rules, due to her testosterone levels.

Chilufya was recalled to the national team for a 2022 friendly against the Netherlands. She appeared in training prior to the 2023 FIFA Women's World Cup, the team's first appearance in the tournament, but she did not make the final squad.

On 3 July 2024, Chilufya was called up to the Zambia squad for the 2024 Summer Olympics.

== International goals ==
No.	Date	Venue	Opponent	Score	Result	Competition
1.	4 November 2020	Wolfson Stadium, Ibhayi, South Africa	Lesotho	3–0	8–0	2020 COSAFA Women's Championship
2.	26 October 2025	Levy Mwanawasa Stadium, Ndola, Zambia	Namibia	3–0	3–0	2026 Women's Africa Cup of Nations qualification
3.	6 June 2026	Levy Mwanawasa Stadium, Ndola, Zambia	Kenya	1–1	1–1 (4–1 p)	2026 Four Nation's Tournament
4.	5 August 2026	Al Medina Stadium, Rabat, Morocco	Malawi	2–0	2–1	2026 Women's Africa Cup of Nations
