= 2025 Kansas City Current season =

Kansas City Current's fifth season

Kansas City Current
2025 season
- Owners: Angie Long; Chris Long; Brittany Mahomes; Patrick Mahomes
- President: Raven Jemison
- Head coach and Sporting Director: Vlatko Andonovski
- Stadium: CPKC Stadium (capacity: 11,500)
- Biggest win: 3 goals (2 times)
Home colors	Away colors
- All statistics correct as of March 23, 2025.

The 2025 Kansas City Current season was the team's fifth season as a professional soccer team. The Current played in the National Women's Soccer League (NWSL), the top tier of women's soccer in the United States.

== Background ==
The Kansas City Current's 2024 season ended with a loss to the 2024 NWSL Shield winner, Orlando Pride, in the semi-finals of the 2024 NWSL Playoffs after finishing fourth in the 2024 regular season. Orlando Pride went on to win the NWSL Championship.

== Stadium and facilities ==
In 2024, The Current began playing in their new home stadium, CPKC Stadium, the first stadium in the world stadium built solely for a women's professional sports team. The stadium has a seating capacity of 11,500 with additional standing-room capacity on its north-end. The stadium is located in the Berkley Riverfront of Kansas City along the banks of the Missouri River, the namesake of the team.

CPKC Stadium held its first match between the Kansas City Current and the Portland Thorns on March 16, 2024. Kansas City won the match 5–4 in front of a sell-out crowd.

The Current continue to train in their dedicated practice facility in Riverside, Missouri, which opened in June 2022. It was the first purpose-built practice facility for an NWSL team.

== Team ==
=== Technical staff ===
As of March 14, 2024.

General manager	Camille Levin Ashton
Head coach	Vlatko Andonovski
Assistant coach	Freya Coombe
Assistant coach	Lucas Rodríguez
Assistant coach	Milan Ivanovic
Goalkeeping coach	Ljupčo Kmetovski
Director of Performance	Garga Caserta
Head Strength Coach	Joseph Potts

=== Squad ===
As of March 23, 2025.

No.	Nat.	Name	Date of birth (age)	Since	Previous team	Notes
Goalkeepers
23	(Brazil)	Lorena	May 6, 1997 (aged 27)		(Brazil) Grêmio FBPA	INT
81	(United States)	Laurel Ivory	August 28, 1999 (aged 25)		(United States) Seattle Reign FC	
0	(United States)	Clare Gagne	February 22, 2002 (aged 23)		(United States) North Carolina Tar Heels	
Defenders
15	(United States)	Alana Cook	April 11, 1997 (aged 27)		(United States) Seattle Reign FC	
27	(United States)	Kayla Sharples	June 17, 1997 (aged 27)		(United States) Bay FC	
4	(United States)	Hailie Mace	March 24, 1997 (aged 27)		(United States) North Carolina Courage	
24	(United States)	Gabrielle Robinson	June 18, 2001 (aged 23)		(United States) West Virginia Mountaineers	SEI
18	(United States)	Izzy Rodriguez	April 13, 1999 (aged 25)		(United States) Ohio State Buckeyes	
2	(United States)	Regan Steigleder	September 3, 1998 (aged 26)		(Sweden) KIF Örebro	
5	(United States)	Ellie Wheeler	December 14, 2001 (aged 23)		(United States) Penn State Nittany Lions	
31	(United States)	Katie Scott	June 20, 2007 (aged 17)		(United States) Penn State Nittany Lions	
7	(United States)	Elizabeth Ball	October 20, 1995 (aged 29)		(United States) Utah Royals	
Midfielders
99	(Brazil)	Debinha	October 20, 1991 (aged 33)		(United States) North Carolina Courage	
16	(United States)	Vanessa DiBernardo	May 15, 1992 (aged 32)		(United States) Chicago Stars FC	
22	(United States)	Bayley Feist	March 14, 1997 (aged 28)		(United States) Washington Spirit	
14	(United States)	Claire Hutton	January 11, 2006 (aged 19)		(United States) From academy	
10	(United States)	Lo'eau LaBonta	March 18, 1993 (aged 31)		(United States) Utah Royals	
33	(Kenya)	Jereko	September 4, 1997 (aged 27)		(Turkey) Hakkarigücü Spor	INT
11	(Costa Rica)	Rocky Rodríguez	October 28, 1993 (aged 31)		(United States) Angel City FC	
Forwards
6	(Malawi)	Temwa Chawinga	September 20, 1998 (aged 26)		(China) Wuhan Jianghan	INT
17	(United States)	Michelle Cooper	December 4, 2002 (aged 22)		(United States) Duke Blue Devils	
47	(United States)	Alex Pfeiffer	November 26, 2007 (aged 17)		(United States) From academy	SEI
8	(Canada)	Nichelle Prince	February 19, 1995 (aged 30)		(United States) Houston Dash	
9	(Brazil)	Bia Zaneratto	December 17, 1993 (aged 31)		(Brazil) Palmeiras	SEI, INT
19	(United States)	Mary Long	January 24, 2007 (aged 18)		(United States) Duke Blue Devils	
13	(United States)	Haley Hopkins	December 21, 1998 (aged 26)		(United States) North Carolina Courage	

== Competitions ==
=== Regular season ===
==== Matches ====
===== March =====
March 15, 2025 1	Kansas City Current	3–1	Portland Thorns FC	Kansas City, Missouri
12:00 p.m. CDT	Chawinga 4'; Hutton (yellow card) 14'; Cooper 24'; Debinha 38'	Report	Reyes (yellow card) 19'; Moultrie 49'; Sugita (yellow card) 51'	Stadium: CPKC Stadium; Attendance: 11,500*; Referee: Alyssa Nichols

March 22, 2025 2	Washington Spirit	0–2	Kansas City Current	Washington, DC
7:30 p.m. EDT		Report	Hutton (yellow card) 33'; Labonta 56' (pen); Rodríguez (yellow card) 83'; Labonta (yellow card) 90+6'; Chawinga 90+8'	Stadium: Audi Field; Attendance: 19,254; Referee: Elijio Arreguin

March 29, 2025 3	Kansas City Current	3–0	Utah Royals	Kansas City, Missouri
6:30 p.m. CDT	Chawinga 22'; Cooper 37'; Debinha 45+2'	Report		Stadium: CPKC Stadium; Referee: Marie Durr; Assistant referees: Matt Trotter, Melisssa Beck; Fourth official: Kaitlyn Trowbridge

===== April =====
April 12, 2025 4	San Diego Wave	0–2	Kansas City Current	San Diego, California
9:00 p.m. CDT		Report	Debinha 16'; Labonta 25' (pen)	Stadium: Snapdragon Stadium; Attendance: 10,873; Referee: John Griggs

April 19, 2025 5	Kansas City Current	2–0	Houston Dash	Kansas City, Missouri
6:30 p.m. CDT	Labonta 21' (pen); Sharples 62'	Report		Stadium: CPKC Stadium; Attendance: 11,500; Referee: Ekaterina Koroleva

April 26, 2025 6	North Carolina Courage	3–2	Kansas City Current	Cary, North Carolina
6:00 p.m. CDT	Ryan Williams 52'; Kurtz 90'; Sanchez 90+3'	Report	Hopkins 39'; Bia Zaneratto 57'	Stadium: WakeMed Soccer Park; Attendance: 6,235; Referee: Shawn Tehini

===== May =====
May 2, 2025 7	Seattle Reign	1–0	Kansas City Current	Seattle, Washington
9:30 p.m. CDT	Biyendolo 37'	Report		Stadium: Lumen Field; Attendance: 5,912; Referee: Calin Radosav

May 11, 2025 8	Kansas City Current	4-1	Bay FC	Kansas City, Missouri
12:00 p.m. CDT	Bia Zaneratto 3'; Debinha 33', 38'; Chawinga 62'	Report	Hocking 53'	Stadium: CPKC Stadium; Attendance: 11,500; Referee: Jaclyn Metz

May 16, 2025 9	Orlando Pride	0–1	Kansas City Current	Orlando, Florida
7:00 p.m. CDT		Report	Chawinga 52'	Stadium: Inter&Co Stadium; Attendance: 8,414; Referee: Natalie Simon

May 24, 2025 10	Chicago Stars	1–3	Kansas City Current	Bridgeview, Illinois
6:30 p.m. CDT	Shea Groom 51'	Report	Bia Zaneratto 34'; Chawinga 41'; Sharples 60'	Stadium: SeatGeek Stadium; Attendance: 3,886; Referee: Matthew Thompson

===== June =====
June 7, 2025 11	Gotham FC	1–2	Kansas City Current	Harrison, New Jersey
12:00 p.m. CDT	DiBernardo 90+11' O.G.	Report	Cooper 3'; Chawinga 11'	Stadium: Sports Illustrated Stadium; Attendance: 10,399; Referee: Danielle Chesky

June 14, 2025 12	Kansas City Current	4–2	Racing Louisville	Kansas City, Missouri
6:30 p.m. CDT	Milliet 2' O.G.; Cooper 15'; Bia Zaneratto 19'; Chawinga 90+5'	Report	Sonis 62'; Kanu 88'	Stadium: CPKC Stadium; Attendance: 11,500; Referee: Jaclyn Metz

June 20, 2025 13	Kansas City Current	1–0	Angel City FC	Kansas City, Missouri
7:00 p.m. CDT	Bia Zaneratto 69'	Report		Stadium: CPKC Stadium; Attendance: 11,500; Referee: Elton Garcia

===== August =====
August 1, 2025 14	Racing Louisville	0–2	Kansas City Current	Louisville, Kentucky
7:00 p.m. CDT		Report	Chawinga 65'; Ball 72'	Stadium: Lynn Family Stadium; Attendance: 8,113; Referee: Nabil Bensalah; Assistant referees: Rhett Hammil, Artyom Arustamyan; Fourth official: Jackson Krauser

August 8, 2025 15	Utah Royals	0–1	Kansas City Current	Sandy, Utah
9:00 p.m. CDT		Report	Chawinga 82'	Stadium: America First Field; Attendance: 6,843; Referee: Brandon Stevis

August 16, 2025 16	Kansas City Current	0–0	Orlando Pride	Kansas City, Missouri
3:00 p.m. CDT		Report		Stadium: CPKC Stadium; Attendance: 11,500; Referee: Brad Jensen

August 23, 2025 17	Portland Thorns	0–2	Kansas City Current	Portland, Oregon
9:00 p.m. CDT	Castellanos (yellow card) 56'; Hiatt (yellow card) 90+11'	Report	Wheeler 1'; Chawinga 71'; Robinson (red card) 90+8'	Stadium: Providence Park; Referee: Alexandra Billeter

August 30, 2025 18	Kansas City Current	2–0	North Carolina Courage	Kansas City, Missouri
6:30 p.m. CDT	Rodriguez 31'; LaBonta 41' (pen.) (yellow card) 71'; Sentnor (yellow card) 44'	Report		Stadium: CPKC Stadium; Attendance: 11,500; Referee: Joshua Encarnación

===== September =====
September 6, 2025 19	Bay FC	0–2	Kansas City Current	San Jose, California
9:00 p.m. CDT	Hill (yellow card) 77'	Report	Rodríguez (yellow card) 40'; Cooper 45'; Chawinga 90+2'	Stadium: PayPal Park; Attendance: 11,520; Referee: Elvis Osmanovic

September 13, 2025 20	Kansas City Current	0–0	Washington Spirit	Kansas City, Missouri
6:30 p.m. CDT (UTC-5)		Report	Hershfelt (yellow card) 21' (red card); Kouassi (yellow card) 79'	Stadium: CPKC Stadium; Attendance: 11,500; Referee: Thomas Snyder (New York)

September 20 21	Kansas City Current	2–0	Seattle Reign	Kansas City, Missouri
	Debinha 34' (pen.); Chawinga 74'; Ball (yellow card) 90+5'; Hutton (yellow card) 90+10'	Box; Report	James-Turner (yellow card) 29'; Mondésir (yellow card) 45'; Huitema (yellow card) 88'	Stadium: CPKC Stadium; Attendance: 11,500; Referee: Shawn Tehini

September 27 22	Kansas City Current	4–1	Chicago Stars FC	Kansas City, Missouri
7:00 p.m. CDT	Debinha 7'; Michelle Cooper (yellow card) 25'; Scott (yellow card) 31'; Zaneratto 51'; Chawinga 73'; LaBonta 90+5' (pen.)	Report	Franklin (yellow card) 13'; Gomes 58'; Cook (yellow card) 90+4'	Stadium: CPKC Stadium; Attendance: 11,500; Referee: Ekaterina Koroleva; Assistant referees: Matt Trotter, Stephen Milhoan; Fourth official: Velimir Stefanovic

===== October =====
October 6, 2025 23	Angel City FC	0–1	Kansas City Current	Los Angeles, California
7:30 p.m. PDT (UTC-7)		Report	Cooper 59'; Wheeler (yellow card) 88'	Stadium: BMO Stadium; Attendance: 11,147; Referee: Gerald Flores

October 11, 2025 24	Kansas City Current	2–0	Gotham FC	Kansas City, Missouri
4:00 p.m. CDT	Bia Zaneratto 34'; Chawinga 51'; Hutton (yellow card) 62'	October 6, 2025 23 / Angel City FC / 0–1 / Kansas City Current / Los Angeles, California; 7:30 p.m. PDT (UTC-7) / / Report / Cooper 59' (Hopkins); Wheeler (yellow card) 88' / Stadium: BMO Stadium; Attendance: 11,147; Referee: Gerald Flores	Howell (yellow card) 40'; Sonnett (yellow card) 85'	Stadium: CPKC Stadium; Attendance: 11,500; Referee: Nabil Bensalah

October 18, 2025 25	Houston Dash	1–0	Kansas City Current	Houston, Texas
6:30 p.m. CDT	Gareis 69'	Report		Stadium: Shell Energy Stadium; Attendance: 8,436; Referee: Iryna Petrunok

===== November =====
November 2, 2025 26	Kansas City Current	2–1	San Diego Wave	Kansas City, Missouri
TBD p.m. CDT	I. Rodriguez (yellow card) 23'; Cooper (yellow card) 45+2'; Debinha 54'; Prince 75'		Dudinha 8'; Dali (yellow card) 28'	Stadium: CPKC Stadium; Attendance: 11,500; Referee: Jaclyn Metz; Assistant referees: Sarah Gaddes, Kevin Huet; Fourth official: Drew Klemp

Last updated: August 19, 2025.
Source: NWSLsoccer.com

==== Regular season standings ====
Pos	Team	Pld	W	D	L	GF	GA	GD	Pts	Qualification
1	Kansas City Current (S)	26	21	2	3	49	13	+36	65	Playoffs and CONCACAF W Champions Cup
2	Washington Spirit	26	12	8	6	42	33	+9	44	Playoffs and CONCACAF W Champions Cup
3	Portland Thorns FC	26	11	7	8	36	29	+7	40	Playoffs
4	Orlando Pride	26	11	7	8	33	27	+6	40	Playoffs
5	Seattle Reign FC	26	10	9	7	32	29	+3	39	Playoffs

Source: NWSL
Rules for classification: 1) points; 2) total goal difference; 3) total wins; 4) total goals scored; 5) head-to-head points; 6) head-to-head goals scored; 7) fewest disciplinary points; 8) coin toss (if 2 clubs tied) or drawing of lots (if ≥3 clubs tied).
(S) NWSL Shield

==== Results summary ====
Overall								Home						Away					
Pld	W	D	L	GF	GA	GD	Pts	W	D	L	GF	GA	GD	W	D	L	GF	GA	GD
16	13	1	2	32	10	+22	40	6	1	0	17	4	+13	7	0	2	15	6	+9

Last updated: August 19, 2025.
Source: NWSLsoccer.com

==== Results by matchday ====
Matchday	1	2	3	4	5	6	7	8	9	10	11	12	13	14	15	16	17	18	19	20	21	22	23	24	25	26
Stadium	H	A	H	A	H	A	A	H	A	A	A	H	H	A	A	H	A	H	A	H	H	H	A	H	A	H
Result	W	W	W	W	W	L	L	W	W	W	W	W	W	W	W	D										
Position	2	2	2	2	1	1	1	1	1	1	1	1	1	1	1	1										

Updated to match(es) played on August 19, 2025. Source: NWSL
A = Away; H = Home; W = Win; D = Draw; L = Loss

=== NWSL playoffs ===
==== Bracket ====
Quarterfinals
1	Kansas City Current	1
8	Gotham FC (a.e.t.)	2
4	Orlando Pride	2
5	Seattle Reign FC	0
2	Washington Spirit (p)	1 (3)
7	Racing Louisville FC	1 (1)
3	Portland Thorns FC (a.e.t.)	1
6	San Diego Wave FC	0

Semifinals
8	Gotham FC	1
4	Orlando Pride	0
2	Washington Spirit	2
3	Portland Thorns FC	0

Championship
8	Gotham FC	1
2	Washington Spirit	0

==== Results ====
November 9, 2025 Quarterfinals	Kansas City Current	1–2 (a.e.t.)	Gotham FC	Kansas City, Missouri
12:30 pm EST	Wheeler 90+6'	Report	Shaw 68'; Stengel 120+1'	Stadium: CPKC Stadium; Attendance: 11,500; Referee: Elijio Arreguin

== Squad statistics ==
Starting appearances are listed first, followed by substitute appearances after the + symbol where applicable.

As of match played November 9, 2025

No.	Pos.	Nat.	Player	NWSL		Playoffs		Total	
No.	Pos.	Nat.	Player	Apps	Goals	Apps	Goals	Apps	Goals
0	GK	(United States)	Clare Gagne	0	0	0	0	0	0
2	DF	(United States)	Regan Steigleder	0+1	0	0	0	1	0
4	DF	(United States)	Hailie Mace	15+8	0	1	0	24	0
5	DF	(United States)	Ellie Wheeler	15+6	1	0+1	1	22	2
6	FW	(Malawi)	Temwa Chawinga	21+2	15	0	0	23	15
7	DF	(United States)	Elizabeth Ball	14+5	1	1	0	20	1
8	FW	(Canada)	Nichelle Prince	6+15	1	1	0	22	1
9	FW	(Brazil)	Bia Zaneratto	19+5	7	1	0	25	7
10	MF	(United States)	Lo'eau LaBonta	21+2	5	1	0	24	5
11	FW	(Costa Rica)	Rocky Rodríguez	7+13	0	0	0	20	0
13	FW	(United States)	Haley Hopkins	3+17	1	0+1	0	21	1
14	MF	(United States)	Claire Hutton	22+3	0	1	0	26	0
15	DF	(United States)	Alana Cook	7	0	0	0	7	0
16	MF	(United States)	Vanessa DiBernardo	11+2	0	0	0	13	0
17	FW	(United States)	Michelle Cooper	17+3	6	0	0	20	6
18	DF	(United States)	Izzy Rodriguez	22+4	1	1	0	27	1
19	FW	(United States)	Mary Long	1+9	0	0	0	10	0
21	MF	(United States)	Ally Sentnor	7+4	0	1	0	12	0
22	MF	(United States)	Bayley Feist	1+8	0	0+1	0	10	0
23	GK	(Brazil)	Lorena	24	0	1	0	25	0
24	DF	(United States)	Gabrielle Robinson	6+2	0	0	0	8	0
27	DF	(United States)	Kayla Sharples	23+1	2	1	0	25	2
31	DF	(United States)	Katie Scott	2	0	0	0	2	0
33	MF	(Kenya)	Jereko	0+1	0	0	0	1	0
47	FW	(United States)	Alex Pfeiffer	1+3	0	0+1	0	5	0
81	GK	(United States)	Laurel Ivory	2	0	0	0	2	0
99	MF	(Brazil)	Debinha	17+5	8	1	0	23	8
Players away from the club on loan:
	MF	(Angola)	Flora Marta Lacho	2+4	0	0	0	6	0

== Transactions ==
=== Contract operations ===
Contract options
Date	Player	Pos.	Notes	Ref.
December 10, 2024	(Denmark) Stine Ballisager Pedersen	DF	Option declined.	
December 10, 2024	(Argentina) Sophia Braun	DF	Option declined.	
December 10, 2024	(United States) Regan Steigleder	DF	Option exercised.	
December 10, 2024	(Brazil) Bia Zaneratto	FW	Option exercised.	

Re-signings
Date	Player	Pos.	Notes	Ref.
August 27, 2024	(United States) Ellie Wheeler	DF	Re-signed to a four-year contract through 2028.	
August 29, 2024	(United States) Alana Cook	DF	Re-signed to a three-year contract through 2027.	
September 6, 2024	(Brazil) Debinha	MF	Re-signed to a two-year contract through 2026 with a mutual option.	
October 24, 2024	(United States) Vanessa DiBernardo	MF	Re-signed to a two-year contract through 2026 with an option.	
December 5, 2024	(Canada) Nichelle Prince	FW	Re-signed to a two-year contract through 2026 with a mutual option.	
January 27, 2025	(United States) Elizabeth Ball	DF	Free agent re-signed to a two-year contract through 2026 with a mutual option.	
January 27, 2025	(United States) Kristen Hamilton	FW	Free agent re-signed to a one-year contract through 2025 with a mutual option.	
January 29, 2025	(Malawi) Temwa Chawinga	FW	Re-signed to a three-year extension through 2028.	
February 20, 2025	(United States) Haley Hopkins	FW	Re-signed to a two-year extension through 2027.	

=== Loans out ===
Date	Player	Pos.	Destination club	Fee/notes	Ref.
March 12, 2025	(Zambia) Fridah Mukoma	FW	(China) Beijing Jingtan FC	Loaned through the 2025 NWSL season.	

=== Transfers in ===
Date	Player	Pos.	Previous club	Fee/notes	Ref.
December 19, 2024	(United States) Laurel Ivory	GK	(United States) Seattle Reign FC	Free agent signing.	
December 20, 2024	(Costa Rica) Rocky Rodríguez	MF	(United States) Angel City FC	In exchange for $100,000 in intra-league transfer funds.	
December 23, 2024	(Brazil) Lorena	GK	(Brazil) Grêmio	Acquired for an undisclosed fee and signed to a three-year contract through 2027 with an option.	
January 9, 2025	(United States) Clare Gagne	GK	(United States) North Carolina Tar Heels	Free agent rookie signed to a one-year contract through 2025.	
January 9, 2025	(United States) Mary Long	FW	(United States) Duke Blue Devils	Free agent rookie signed to a one-year contract through 2025.	
January 9, 2025	(United States) Katie Scott	DF	(United States) Penn State Nittany Lions	Free agent rookie signed to a one-year contract through 2025.	
January 30, 2025	(United States) Haley Hopkins	FW	(United States) North Carolina Courage	In exchange for $50,000 in intra-league transfer funds.	
March 12, 2025	(Angola) Flora Marta Lacho	FW	(Democratic Republic of the Congo) TP Mazembe	Signed to a two-year contract through 2026.	
March 12, 2025	(Zambia) Fridah Mukoma	FW	(Zambia) ZESCO Ndola Girls	Acquired for an undisclosed transfer fee and signed to a four-year contract through 2028.	

=== Transfers out ===
Date	Player	Pos.	Destination club	Fee/notes	Ref.
December 10, 2024	(United States) Katie Fraine	GK		Out of contract.	
December 10, 2024	(United States) Adrianna Franch	GK	(England) Birmingham City	Out of contract.	
December 10, 2024	(Germany) Almuth Schult	GK	Retired	Out of contract.	
December 10, 2024	(United States) Mallory Weber	DF	Retired	Out of contract.	
January 15, 2025	(Nigeria) Opeyemi Ajakaye	FW	(Nigeria) FC Robo	Mutual contract termination.	

=== Retirements ===
Date	Player	Pos.	Ref.
October 17, 2024	(Canada) Desiree Scott	MF	

=== Injury listings ===
Date	Player	Pos.	List	Injury	Ref.
May 30, 2024	(United States) Gabrielle Robinson	DF	Season-ending injury	Torn ACL sustained in match against the Utah Royals.	
July 4, 2024	(United States) Alex Pfeiffer	FW	Season-ending injury	Torn ACL and meniscus sustained in match against the Houston Dash.	
March 14, 2025	(Brazil) Bia Zaneratto	FW	Season-ending injury	Foot injury sustained in 2024.	

=== Preseason trialists ===
Trialists are non-rostered invitees during preseason and are not automatically signed. The Current released their preseason roster on January 15, 2025.

Player	Pos.	Previous club	Status	Ref.
(United States) Meila Brewer	DF	(United States) KC Athletics	Not signed; U18 trialist.	
(United States) Evan O'Steen	GK	(United States) Solar SC	Not signed; U18 trialist.	
(United States) Ava Tankersley	FW	(United States) Arkansas Razorbacks	Not signed.	
(United States) Mallory Weber	DF	(United States) Kansas City Current	Not signed.	
