= NWSL records and statistics =

Notable records and statistics in the NWSL

The following is a compilation of notable records and statistics for teams and players in the National Women's Soccer League (NWSL). The NWSL's inaugural season was kicked off on April 13, 2013 with 8 participating clubs, four of the eight inaugural clubs still exist with their original names. For historical purposes, the league's stats and records include active and defunct clubs.

Statistics for the NWSL Challenge Cup, a competition originally created in place of the 2020 season that was cancelled due to the COVID-19 pandemic, are treated separately from regular season statistics.

== Champions and shield winners ==
=== By season ===
Through November 22, 2025 (2025 NWSL Championship)

Season	Playoff final			Regular season		
Season	Champions	Score	Runners-up	Shield winners	Points	Runners-up
2013	Portland Thorns FC	2–0; Details	Western New York Flash	Western New York Flash	38–38; Standings	FC Kansas City
2014	FC Kansas City	2–1; Details	Seattle Reign FC	Seattle Reign FC	54–41; Standings	FC Kansas City
2015	FC Kansas City	1–0; Details	Seattle Reign FC	Seattle Reign FC	43–33; Standings	Chicago Red Stars
2016	Western New York Flash	2–2 AET, 3–2 PKs; Details	Washington Spirit	Portland Thorns FC	41–39; Standings	Washington Spirit
2017	Portland Thorns FC	1–0; Details	North Carolina Courage	North Carolina Courage	49–47; Standings	Portland Thorns FC
2018	North Carolina Courage	3–0; Details	Portland Thorns FC	North Carolina Courage	57–42; Standings	Portland Thorns FC
2019	North Carolina Courage	4–0; Details	Chicago Red Stars	North Carolina Courage	49–44; Standings	Chicago Red Stars
2021	Washington Spirit	2–1 AET; Details	Chicago Red Stars	Portland Thorns FC	44–42; Standings	OL Reign
2022	Portland Thorns FC	2–0; Details	Kansas City Current	OL Reign	40–39; Standings	Portland Thorns FC
2023	NJ/NY Gotham FC	2–1; Details	OL Reign	San Diego Wave FC	37–35; Standings	Portland Thorns FC
2024	Orlando Pride	1–0; Details	Washington Spirit	Orlando Pride	60–56; Standings	Washington Spirit
2025	Gotham FC	1–0; Details	Washington Spirit	Kansas City Current	65-44; Standings	Washington Spirit
2026	Kansas City Current	2–1; Details	Washington Spirit	Gotham FC	61-58; Standings	San Diego Wave FC

=== Total trophies by team ===
Through November 21, 2026 (2026 NWSL Championship).

Green shading indicates record highs. Italics indicates a defunct team.

Team	Trophies	Regular seasons*	Domestic					International	
Team	Trophies	Regular seasons*	Playoffs	Championships	Shields	Challenge Cups	Community Shields	CONCACAF W Champions Cup	NWSL x Liga MX Femenil Summer Cup
Portland Thorns FC	7	12	11	3 (2013, 2017, 2022)	2 (2016, 2021)	1 (2021)	1 (2020*)	–	–
North Carolina Courage	7	8	6	2 (2018, 2019)	3 (2017, 2018, 2019)	2 (2022, 2023)	–	–	–
Gotham FC / NJ/NY Gotham FC / Sky Blue FC	4	12	5	2 (2023, 2025)	–	1 (2026)	–	1 (2024-25)	–
Seattle Reign FC / OL Reign / Reign FC	3	12	9	–	3 (2014, 2015, 2022)	–	–	–	–
Kansas City Current	3	5	3	1 (2026)	1 (2025)	–	–	–	1 (2024)
Washington Spirit	2	12	6	1 (2021)	–	1 (2025)	–	–	–
Orlando Pride	2	9	3	1 (2024)	1 (2024)	–	–	–	–
FC Kansas City	2	5	3	2 (2014, 2015)	–	–	–	–	–
San Diego Wave FC	2	4	3	–	1 (2023)	1 (2024)	–	–	–
Western New York Flash	2	4	2	1 (2016)	1 (2013)	–	–	–	–
Houston Dash	1	11	1	–	–	1 (2020*)	–	–	–
Chicago Stars	0	12	8	–	–	–	–	–	–
Angel City FC	0	4	1	–	–	–	–	–	–
Bay FC	0	2	1	–	–	–	–	–	–
Racing Louisville FC	0	5	1	–	–	–	–	–	–
Boston Breakers	0	5	0	–	–	–	–	–	–
Utah Royals	0	4	0	–	–	–	–	–	–

*While there was no 2020 regular season (i.e., it is not included in the second column), 2020 did include the inaugural Challenge Cup, which has been played every year since. It also included the 2020 Fall Series, for which the Community Shield (distinct from the NWSL Shield) was awarded.

== Team records ==
=== Wins ===
- Most wins in a season:
  - 26 games: 21, Kansas City Current (2025)
  - 24 games: 17, North Carolina Courage (2018)
  - 22 games: 11, Portland Thorns (2013), FC Kansas City (2013), OL Reign (now Seattle Reign) (2022), San Diego Wave (2023)
  - 20 games: 13, Seattle Reign FC (2015)
- Fewest wins in a season:
  - 20 games: 3, Boston Breakers (2016)
  - 24 games: 1, Sky Blue FC (Gotham FC) (2018)
- Highest win percentage in a season: 80.8%, Kansas City Current (2025)
- Lowest win percentage in a season: 4.2%, Sky Blue FC (now Gotham FC) (2018)
- Most home wins in a season:
  - 30 games: 11, Kansas City Current (2026)
  - 26 games: 11, Kansas City Current (2025)
- Most away wins in a season: 10, Kansas City Current (2025)
- Most consecutive wins: 9, Kansas City Current (October 5, 2024–April 19, 2025)
- Most consecutive wins in a season (26 games): 8, Orlando Pride (April 12, 2024–June 7, 2024), Kansas City Current (May 11, 2025–August 8, 2025)
- Most consecutive games without a win: 23, Sky Blue FC (now Gotham FC) (2018)
- Most consecutive away games without a win: 19, Boston Breakers (August 6, 2014–July 10, 2016)
- Most consecutive home wins in a season: 7, Portland Thorns FC (June 28, 2017–September 30, 2017), North Carolina Courage (July 5, 2019–October 12, 2019)
- Most consecutive away wins in a season: 8, Kansas City Current (May 16, 2025–October 6, 2025)
- Most consecutive home wins: 10, Kansas City Current (September 20, 2025–May 30, 2026)
- Most total wins in regular season (311 games): 146, Portland Thorns FC (April, 13, 2013–October 27, 2026)

=== Losses ===
- Most losses in a season:
  - 30 games: 22, Chicago Stars FC (2026)
  - 26 games: 16, Houston Dash (2024)
  - 24 games: 17, Sky Blue FC (now Gotham FC) (2018)
  - 22 games: 17, NJ/NY Gotham FC (now Gotham FC) (2022)
  - 20 games: 15, Boston Breakers (2016)
- Fewest losses in a season (24 games): 1, North Carolina Courage (2018)
- Highest loss percentage: 77.3%, NJ/NY Gotham FC (now Gotham FC) (2022)
- Lowest loss percentage: 4.2%, North Carolina Courage (2018)
- Longest unbeaten regular season run: 24 games, Orlando Pride (October 15, 2023–October 11, 2024)
- Most total losses in regular season (295 games): 139, Houston Dash
- Fewest home losses in a season:
  - (15 games): 0, Kansas City Current (2026)
  - (13 games): 0, Kansas City Current (2025)
  - (12 games): 0, Seattle Reign FC (2014)
- Most consecutive losses in a season: 11, NJ/NY Gotham FC (now Gotham FC) (2022)
- Most consecutive home games undefeated: 32, Kansas City Current (September 7, 2024–October 25, 2026)

=== Points ===
- Most points in a season:
  - 26 games: 65, Kansas City Current (2025)
  - 24 games: 57, North Carolina Courage (2018)
  - 22 games: 40, OL Reign (now Seattle Reign) (2022)
  - 20 games: 43, Seattle Reign (2015)
- Most points per game in a season: 2.50, Kansas City Current (2025)
- Fewest points per game in a season: 0.375, Sky Blue FC (now Gotham FC) (2018)

=== Attendance by season ===
Season	Regular season								Playoffs
Season	Matches	Overall			Highest		Lowest		Mean
Season	Matches	Total	Mean	Median	Club	Mean	Club	Mean	Mean
2013	88	375,743	4,270	3,007	Portland Thorns FC	13,320	Sky Blue FC	1,664	6,820
2014	108	446,311	4,133	3,014	Portland Thorns FC	13,362	Sky Blue FC	1,639	3,763
2015	90	454,100	5,046	3,367	Portland Thorns FC	15,639	Sky Blue FC	2,268	6,766
2016	100	555,775	5,558	3,997	Portland Thorns FC	16,945	Sky Blue FC	2,162	10,863
2017	120	609,960	5,083	3,576	Portland Thorns FC	17,653	FC Kansas City	1,788	12,111
2018	108	650,562	6,024	4,025	Portland Thorns FC	16,959	Sky Blue FC	2,531	13,323 (Note: A semifinal that would have been played in North Carolina was moved to Portland due to Hurricane Florence.)
2019	108	792,409	7,337	5,565	Portland Thorns FC	20,098	Sky Blue FC	3,338	8,956
2021 (Note: Due to restrictions related to the COVID-19 pandemic, many teams had reduced capacities for part or all of the season, including some games with zero fans.)	120	567,072	5,155		Portland Thorns FC	14,391	Chicago Red Stars	3,222	8,774
2022	132	1,042,063	7,917		Angel City FC	19,105	Orlando Pride	4,385	21,730
2023	132	1,366,581	10,869		San Diego Wave FC	20,718	North Carolina Courage	5,384	19,581
2024	182	2,040,348	11,211		San Diego Wave FC	19,575 (Note: Due to a match being relocated to Louisville, San Diego played only 12 home matches in the 2024 season.)	Houston Dash	6,194	14,734
2025	182	1,917,401	10,535		Portland Thorns FC	18,173	Racing Louisville FC	5,521	16,351
2026	240	2,647,663	11,031		Portland Thorns FC	19,073	Chicago Stars FC	4,552	

=== Goals ===
- Most goals scored in a season:
  - 26 games: 57, Kansas City Current (2024)
  - 24 games: 54, North Carolina Courage (2019)
  - 22 games: 49, Portland Thorns (2022)
  - 20 games: 41, Seattle Reign (2015)
- Fewest goals scored in a season: 12, Washington Spirit (2018)
- Most goals conceded in a season: 54, Chicago Stars (2025)
- Fewest goals conceded in a season: 13, Kansas City Current (2025)
- Best goal difference in a season: 36, North Carolina Courage (2018), Kansas City Current (2025)
- Most penalty-kick goals in a season: 7, Portland Thorns FC (2025)
- Most goals scored in total (through 2025): 447, Portland Thorns FC
- Most goals conceded in total (through 2025): 394, Sky Blue FC / Gotham FC
- Most consecutive games scoring: 28 games, FC Kansas City (2013–2014) includes 3 playoff games
- Most games scoring 2+ goals: 18 games, Kansas City Current (2025)
- Most consecutive games scoring 2+ goals: 7 games, Western New York Flash (2013)
- Longest shutout streak: 9 games / 870 minutes, Kansas City Current (2025)
- Most shutouts in a season: 16, Kansas City Current (2025)
- Most consecutive shutouts in a season: 9, Kansas City Current (2025)

=== Regular season records ===
Through 2026 season (regular season games only)

Pts rank (prev. season)	PPG rank (prev. season)	Club	Seasons (Note: No regular season in 2020.)	GP	W	D	L	GF	GA	GD	Pts	PPG	1st	2nd	3rd	4th
Pts rank (prev. season)	PPG rank (prev. season)	Club	Seasons	GP	W	D	L	GF	GA	GD	Pts	PPG	Finishing positions			
1 (1)	3 (2)	Portland Thorns FC	13 (2013–)	308	144	77	87	497	365	132	509	1.653	2	4	4	
2 (2)	4 (4)	Seattle Reign FC (Note: Known as Seattle Reign FC from 2013–2018, Reign FC in 2019, and OL Reign from 2020–2023.)	13 (2013–)	308	135	76	97	433	354	79	481	1.562	3	1	1	1
3 (4)	8 (10)	Washington Spirit	13 (2013–)	308	117	74	117	402	416	-14	425	1.380		3	2	2
4 (5)	10 (11)	Gotham FC (Note: Known as Sky Blue FC from 2013–2020.)	13 (2013–)	308	111	79	118	375	387	-12	412	1.338	1		1	1
5 (3)	14 (8)	Chicago Red Stars	13 (2013–)	308	113	76	119	401	459	-58	393	1.276		2	1	3
6 (6)	1 (1)	North Carolina Courage	9 (2017–)	222	110	42	70	371	249	122	372	1.676	3		1	
7 (7)	15 (15)	Houston Dash	12 (2014–)	286	87	62	137	319	414	-95	323	1.129				1
8 (8)	11 (9)	Orlando Pride	10 (2016–)	242	91	49	102	313	350	-37	322	1.331	1		1	1
9 (9)	2 (3)	Kansas City Current (Note: Known as Kansas City NWSL in 2021.)	6 (2021–)	150	74	29	47	234	184	50	251	1.673	1			2
10 (12)	5 (6)	San Diego Wave FC	5 (2022–)	126	55	28	43	173	143	30	193	1.532	1	1	1	
11 (10)	6 (5)	FC Kansas City	5 (2013–2017)	110	45	27	36	152	125	27	168	1.527		2	1	
12 (13)	13 (12)	Utah Royals	5 (2018–2019, 2024–)	130	46	28	56	141	169	-28	166	1.277				
13 (15)	12 (13)	Angel City FC	5 (2022–)	126	45	31	50	168	172	-4	163 (Note: The NWSL docked Angel City FC three points during the 2024 season for violating player compensation rules.)	1.294				
14 (11)	17 (14)	Racing Louisville FC	6 (2021–)	150	40	41	69	175	238	-63	161	1.073				
15 (13)	7 (7)	Western New York Flash	4 (2013–2016)	86	33	22	31	142	118	24	119	1.384	1			1
16 (16)	19 (17)	Boston Breakers	5 (2013–2017)	110	25	20	65	132	212	-80	95	0.864				
17 (17)	18 (16)	Bay FC	3 (2024–)	82	22	15	45	87	129	-42	81	0.988				
18 (-)	9 (-)	Denver Summit FC	1 (2026–)	30	11	8	11	53	42	11	41	1.367				
19 (-)	16 (-)	Boston Legacy FC	1 (2026–)	30	9	6	15	41	53	-12	33	1.100				

Sort order is points, finishing positions, wins.
Italics denote defunct teams.
Green, red, and gray denote a column's best and worst values.

=== Playoff records ===
Through 2026 playoffs

Rank	Club	Championships	Runners-up	Seasons qualified	GP	W	L	D (Note: Draws after 120 minutes are decided by penalties.)	Penalty wins	PPG	GF	GA	GD
1	Portland Thorns FC	3	1	11/12	16	8	8	0	0	1.500	21	22	−1
2	North Carolina Courage	2	1	6/8	9	5	4	0	0	1.667	14	6	+8
3	FC Kansas City	2	0	3/5	5	4	1	0	0	2.400	10	4	+6
4	Gotham FC	2	0	5/12	10	7	2	1	0	2.200	12	7	+5
5	Washington Spirit	1	3	6/12	13	6	4	3	2	1.615	16	15	+1
6	Kansas City Current	1	1	3/5	6	3	3	0	0	1.500	8	8	0
7	Western New York Flash	1	1	2/4	4	2	1	1	1	1.750	8	7	+1
8	Orlando Pride	1	0	3/9	6	4	2	0	0	2.000	11	8	−4
9	Seattle Reign FC	0	3	8/12	12	4	8	0	0	1.000	12	18	−6
10	Chicago Stars FC	0	2	8/12	11	3	8	0	0	0.818	8	20	−12
11	San Diego Wave FC	0	0	3/4	4	1	3	0	0	0.750	3	5	−2
12	Bay FC	0	0	1/2	1	0	1	0	0	0.000	1	2	−1
13	Angel City FC	0	0	1/4	1	0	1	0	0	0.000	0	1	−1
14	Racing Louisville	0	0	1/5	1	0	0	1	0	0.000	1	1	0
15	Houston Dash	0	0	1/11	1	0	1	0	0	0.000	1	2	−1
16	Utah Royals (Note: Includes both defunct 2018-19 team and current 2024-present team.)	0	0	0/4	Have not qualified								
17	Boston Breakers	0	0	0/5	Have not qualified								

Sort order is championships, runners-up, fraction of seasons qualified, PPG.
Italics denotes defunct teams.
Green, red, and gray denote a column's best and worst values.

== Player records ==
Boldface indicates players currently active in the league.

=== Consecutive play streaks ===
- Most consecutive games played: 134 games, Kayleigh Kurtz, 26 June 2021–present (as of 26 Aug 2026).
- Most consecutive minutes played: 12,022 minutes, Kayleigh Kurtz, 26 June 2021–present (as of 26 Aug 2026; this is not a multiple of 90 minutes due a rain-shortened game).
- Most consecutive games played from an expansion team's start in the league: 73 games, Kate Del Fava, Utah Royals, 2024–present (as of 26 Aug 2026).
- Most consecutive minutes played from an expansion team's start in the league: 6570 minutes, Kate Del Fava, Utah Royals, 2024–present (as of 26 Aug 2026).

Most minutes played (Regular season only; as of August 9, 2026)
Rank	Player	Minutes played	Games
1	(United States) Lauren Barnes	21,109	252
2	(United States) **Alyssa Naeher**	19,432	218
3	(United States) **Sofia Huerta**	18,592	217
4	(United States) **Danielle Colaprico**	18,436	232
5	(Wales) **Jess Fishlock**	17,865	222
6	(New Zealand) Abby Erceg	17,261	195
7	(United States) **Arin Wright**	17,140	209
8	(Canada) **Kailen Sheridan**	16,592	184
9	(United States) **Jane Campbell**	16,528	185
10	(United States) **Emily Menges**	16,394	191
11	(United States) McCall Zerboni	16,292	217
12	(United States) Becky Sauerbrunn	16,217	189
13	(United States) **Caprice Dydasco**	16,097	196
14	(United States) **Vanessa DiBernardo**	16,038	208
15	(Canada) Christine Sinclair	15,677	200
16	(United States) **Emily Sonnett**	15,550	180
17	(United States) **Carson Pickett**	15,187	197
18	(United States) **Aubrey Kingsbury**	15,160	170
19	(United States) Ali Krieger	15,026	176
20	(United States) **Lo'eau LaBonta**	14,965	198
21	(Republic of Ireland) **Denise O'Sullivan**	14,757	186
22	(United States) Allie Long	14,753	172

=== Most appearances, regular season only ===
Most NWSL appearances (Regular season only; as of August 9, 2026)
Rank	Player	Games
1	(United States) Lauren Barnes	252
2	(United States) **Danielle Colaprico**	232
3	(Wales) **Jess Fishlock**	222
4	(United States) **Alyssa Naeher**	218
5	(United States) McCall Zerboni	217
5	(United States) **Sofia Huerta**	217
7	(United States) **Arin Wright**	209
8	(United States) **Vanessa DiBernardo**	208
9	(Canada) Christine Sinclair	200
10	(United States) **Lo'eau LaBonta**	198
11	(United States) **Carson Pickett**	197
12	(United States) **Caprice Dydasco**	196
12	(United States) Merritt Mathias	196
12	(United States) Jasmyne Spencer	196
14	(New Zealand) Abby Erceg	195
16	(United States) **Emily Menges**	191
17	(United States) Becky Sauerbrunn	189
18	(Republic of Ireland) **Denise O'Sullivan**	186
19	**(United States) Jane Campbell**	185
20	**(Canada) Kailen Sheridan**	184
21	(United States) Jessica McDonald	182
22	(Costa Rica) **Rocky Rodríguez**	181
22	**(United States) Emily Sonnett**	180
22	**(United States) Dani Weatherholt**	180
24	(United States) Ali Krieger	176

=== Goals ===
- First NWSL goal: Renae Cuellar for FC Kansas City against Portland Thorns FC, 3rd minute (April 13, 2013)
- Fastest goal: Michelle Cooper for Kansas City Current against Washington Spirit, 22 seconds (June 18, 2023)
- Most goals in a regular season:
  - 24 games: 18, Sam Kerr (2019)
  - 26 games: 20, Temwa Chawinga (2024)
  - 30 games: 20, Ashley Sanchez (2026)
- Most goals per team game in a season: 0.81, Temwa Chawinga (2024)
- Most goals in a regular season by a rookie: 11, Diana Ordóñez (2022, 22-game season)
- Most goals in a game: 4, Sam Kerr (August 19, 2017); Kristen Hamilton (July 5, 2019); Alex Morgan (May 7, 2022)
- Most goals in a half: 4, Sam Kerr (August 19, 2017)
- Most hat-tricks in a season: 2, Sam Kerr (2017), Kristen Hamilton (2019), Sophia Wilson (2023)
- Most seasons to score at least 10 goals: 4, Sophia Wilson, 2022, 2023, 2024, 2026 (with Portland Thorns FC)
- Most consecutive seasons to score at least 10 goals: 3, Sam Kerr, 2017–2019 (with Sky Blue FC, Chicago Red Stars), Sophia Wilson, 2022–2024 (with Portland Thorns FC)
- Most consecutive seasons to score at least 15 goals: 3, Sam Kerr, 2017–2019 (with Sky Blue FC, Chicago Red Stars)
- Most different clubs to score for: 6, Jessica McDonald for Seattle Reign FC, Portland Thorns FC, Houston Dash, Western New York Flash, North Carolina Courage, and Racing Louisville FC
- Youngest player to score: KK Ream, 16 years and 52 days (August 29, 2025, for Utah Royals against Portland Thorns FC)
- First goal by a goalkeeper: Michelle Betos (June 19, 2015 for Portland Thorns FC against FC Kansas City)

=== Top scorers ===
==== Goals, regular season only ====
NWSL all-time leading goalscorers (Regular season only; as of August 9, 2026)
Rank	Player	Goals
1	(Australia) **Sam Kerr**	79
2	(United States) **Lynn Biyendolo**	70
3	(Canada) Christine Sinclair	66
4	(United States) Alex Morgan	60
5	(United States) **Ashley Hatch**	59
5	(Brazil) **Debinha**	59
7	(United States) Jessica McDonald	54
8	(United States) **Sophia Wilson**	53
9	(United States) Megan Rapinoe	51
10	(Wales) **Jess Fishlock**	50
11	(United States) Christen Press	49
12	(United States) **Sydney Leroux**	48
13	(Brazil) **Marta**	46
14	(Malawi) **Temwa Chawinga**	44
15	(United States) Carli Lloyd	43
16	(United States) Crystal Dunn	39
16	(United States) **Sofia Huerta**	39
16	(United States) Amy Rodriguez	39
19	(Denmark) Nadia Nadim	38
20	(United States) Bethany Bos	37
20	(United States) **Trinity Rodman**	37
20	(England) Rachel Daly	37
23	(United States) Allie Long	36
24	(United States) **Mallory Swanson**	34
25	(United States) Kealia Watt	33
25	| (Zambia) **Barbra Banda**	33

==== Leading goalscorers in playoffs ====
NWSL all-time playoff leading goalscorers Last updated after 2025 season.
Rank	Player	Goals
1	(United States) Amy Rodriguez	6
2	(United States) Crystal Dunn	5
3	(Zambia) **Barbra Banda**	4
3	(United States) **Lynn Biyendolo**	4
3	(Brazil) **Debinha**	4
3	(United States) Jessica McDonald	4
3	(United States) Samantha Mewis	4
8	(United States) **Rose Lavelle**	3
8	(United States) **Lindsey Heaps**	3
8	**(United States) Haley McCutcheon**	3
8	(United States) Tobin Heath	3
8	(United States) Megan Rapinoe	3
8	(Canada) Christine Sinclair	3

==== NWSL top goal scorers by regular season ====
Top regular-season goal scorers Last updated after 2025 season.
Year	Player	Team	Goals	Games	GPG
2013	(United States) Lauren Holiday	FC Kansas City	12	18	.666
2014	(Scotland) Kim Little	Seattle Reign FC	16	23	.695
2015	(United States) **Crystal Dunn**	Washington Spirit	15	20	.750
2016	(United States) **Lynn Biyendolo**	Western New York Flash	11	19	.579
2017	(Australia) Sam Kerr	Sky Blue FC	17	22	.773
2018	(Australia) Sam Kerr	Chicago Red Stars	16	19	.842
2019	(Australia) Sam Kerr	Chicago Red Stars	18	21	.857
2021	(United States) **Ashley Hatch**	Washington Spirit	10	20	.500
2022	(United States) Alex Morgan	San Diego Wave FC	15	17	.882
2023	(United States) **Sophia Wilson**	Portland Thorns FC	11	18	.611
2024	(Malawi) **Temwa Chawinga**	Kansas City Current	20	26	.808
2025	(Malawi) **Temwa Chawinga**	Kansas City Current	15	23	.652
2026	(United States) **Ashley Sanchez**	North Carolina Courage	20	30	.667

*GPG = goals per game played

=== Assists ===
- Most assists in a season: 11, Croix Bethune, Kansas City Current (2026) (*30 game season)
  - Most assists in a season: 10, Tobin Heath, Portland Thorns (2016) (*20 game season)
- Most assists in a single match: 4, Nahomi Kawasumi (for Seattle Reign FC vs. Washington Spirit, May 16, 2017)

==== Most assists ====
Most assists (career) (Regular season only; as of August 9, 2026)
Rank	Player	Assists
1	**(United States) Sofia Huerta**	35
2	**(United States) Vanessa DiBernardo**	31
2	**(United States) Lynn Biyendolo**	31
2	(United States) Jessica McDonald	31
5	**(Wales) Jess Fishlock**	30
6	(United States) Alex Morgan	28
7	**(United States)** Crystal Dunn	26
7	(Brazil) **Debinha**	26
7	(Japan) Nahomi Kawasumi	26
7	(United States) Megan Rapinoe	26
11	**(Australia) Sam Kerr**	25
11	(Japan) Yūki Nagasato	25
13	(United States) Tobin Heath	24
14	**(United States) Trinity Rodman**	23
14	(United States) Meghan Klingenberg	23
15	(United States) Christine Nairn	22
17	(United States) Kelley O'Hara	21
18	(United States) Kealia Watt	20
18	(United States) **Croix Bethune**	20
18	(United States) Erika Tymrak	20

==== Assist leaders by season ====
Most assists per regular season Last updated after 2025 season.
Year	Player	Assists	Apps	Assists/App
2013	(United States) Lauren Holiday	9	18	0.50
2014	**(Wales) Jessica Fishlock**	8	22	0.37
2015	(Scotland) Kim Little	7	20	0.35
2016	(United States) Tobin Heath	10	15	0.67
2017	**(Japan)** Nahomi Kawasumi	9	24	0.38
2018	(United States) Jessica McDonald	8	23	0.35
2019	**(Japan)** Yūki Nagasato	8	24	0.33
2021	**(United States) Trinity Rodman**	6	22	0.27
2021	**(United States)** **Sofia Huerta**	6	23	0.26
2022	**(United States) Carson Pickett**	6	20	0.30
2022	**(United States) Mallory Swanson**	6	16	0.38
2023	**(United States) Sam Coffey**	8	22	0.37
2024	**(United States) Croix Bethune**	10	17	0.59
2025	(France) **Delphine Cascarino**	6	24	0.25
2025	(United States) **Izzy Rodriguez**	6	26	0.23

=== Goalkeepers ===
==== Clean sheets ====
Most shutouts (career) (Regular season only; as of November 01, 2026)
#	Player	Shutouts	Apps	Shutout %
1	(United States) Nicole Barnhart	52	144	36.1%
2	**(Canada) Kailen Sheridan**	51	196	26.0%
3	(United States) Alyssa Naeher	50	224	22.3%
4	(United States) **Jane Campbell**	48	190	25.3%
5	(United States) Adrianna Franch	46	144	31.9%
5	(United States) **Casey Murphy**	46	152	30.2%
5	(United States) **Aubrey Kingsbury**	46	170	27.1%
8	**(England) Anna Moorhouse**	33	92	35.9%
9	**(Germany) Ann-Katrin Berger**	30	73	41.0%
10	**(United States) Bella Bixby**	27	64	42.2%
11	(United States) Katelyn Rowland	25	80	31.3%

==== Saves ====
Most saves (career) (Regular season only; as of July 13, 2026)
#	Player	Saves
1	(United States) **Alyssa Naeher**	755
2	(United States) **Jane Campbell**	658
2	(Canada) **Kailen Sheridan**	658
4	(United States) **Aubrey Kingsbury**	575
5	(United States) Ashlyn Harris	532
6	(United States) Nicole Barnhart	476
7	(United States) **Casey Murphy**	475
8	(United States) Adrianna Franch	470
9	(United States) Michelle Betos	345
10	(United States) Katie Atkinson	337
11	(Bosnia and Herzegovina) **DiDi Haračić**	310
12	(United States) **Abby Smith**	295
13	(Canada) Erin McLeod	289
14	(England) **Anna Moorhouse**	284
15	(United States) Haley Kopmeyer	238

==== Goals scored ====
Most goals (career) (Regular season only; as of August 26, 2026)
#	Player	Team(s)	Score(s)	Date(s)
1	(United States) Michelle Betos	Portland Thorns FC	**1**–1	19 June 2015
1	(United States) **Bella Bixby**	Portland Thorns FC	**3**–3	29 April 2023
1	(United States) **Alyssa Naeher**	Chicago Stars FC	3–**3**	18 Aug 2025

==== Assists ====
Most assists (career) (Regular season only; as of August 26, 2026)
#	Player	Team(s)	Score(s)	Date(s)
1	(United States) **Jane Campbell**	Houston Dash	**1**–0	3 June 2018
1	(United States) **Mandy McGlynn**	Portland Thorns FC	**1**–0	15 March 2025
1	(Canada) **Kailen Sheridan**	Chicago Stars FC	**1**–0	12 June 2022
1	(United States) **Casey Murphy**	Boston Legacy FC	**1**–0	2 August 2026
1	(Australia) **Mackenzie Arnold**	Portland Thorns FC	**4**–1	9 Aug 2026

== Match records ==
Largest victories
Winning margin	Date	Home team	Result	Away team
6	July 13, 2014	Portland Thorns FC	7–1	FC Kansas City
6	June 24, 2016	Western New York Flash	7–1	Boston Breakers
6	September 11, 2019	North Carolina Courage	6–0	Portland Thorns FC
6	June 19, 2022	Portland Thorns FC	6–0	Orlando Pride
6	June 24, 2024	Orlando Pride	6–0	Utah Royals
5	June 7, 2014	Portland Thorns FC	0–5	Western New York Flash
5	June 21, 2014	Washington Spirit	1–6	Portland Thorns FC
5	July 6, 2014	Sky Blue FC	0–5	FC Kansas City
5	July 27, 2014	Seattle Reign FC	5–0	Portland Thorns FC
5	August 12, 2017	Orlando Pride	5–0	Sky Blue FC
5	August 25, 2018	Houston Dash	6–1	Sky Blue FC
5	September 4, 2018	Chicago Red Stars	5–0	Sky Blue FC
5	September 8, 2018	North Carolina Courage	5–0	Houston Dash
5	April 17, 2019	North Carolina Courage	5–0	Orlando Pride
5	July 24, 2019	Portland Thorns FC	5–0	Houston Dash
5	September 14, 2019	North Carolina Courage	6–1	Orlando Pride
5	May 16, 2021	Portland Thorns FC	5–0	Chicago Red Stars
5	May 28, 2021	North Carolina Courage	5–0	Racing Louisville FC

Highest scoring
Goals scored	Date	Home team	Result	Away team
9	July 20, 2014	Portland Thorns FC	6–3	Boston Breakers
9	July 22, 2017	Seattle Reign FC	5–4	Sky Blue FC
9	August 19, 2017	Sky Blue FC	5–4	Seattle Reign FC
9	October 7, 2023	Kansas City Current	6–3	Chicago Red Stars
9	March 16, 2024	Kansas City Current	5–4	Portland Thorns FC
8	July 13, 2014	Portland Thorns FC	7–1	FC Kansas City
8	June 24, 2016	Western New York Flash	7–1	Boston Breakers
8	May 13, 2017	Seattle Reign FC	6–2	Washington Spirit
8	April 20, 2019	Chicago Red Stars	4–4	Portland Thorns FC
7	June 6, 2013	Portland Thorns FC	4–3	FC Kansas City
7	July 27, 2013	Washington Spirit	2–5	Boston Breakers
7	June 21, 2014	Washington Spirit	1–6	Portland Thorns FC
7	August 3, 2014	Boston Breakers	3–4	Western New York Flash
7	August 6, 2015	Portland Thorns FC	5–2	Boston Breakers
7	May 21, 2016	Western New York Flash	5–2	Sky Blue FC
7	July 23, 2016	Seattle Reign FC	5–2	Orlando Pride
7	May 6, 2017	Washington Spirit	4–3	Sky Blue FC
7	September 30, 2017	Boston Breakers	3–4	Sky Blue FC
7	May 23, 2018	Orlando Pride	3–4	North Carolina Courage
7	May 26, 2018	Chicago Red Stars	2–5	Orlando Pride
7	August 25, 2018	Houston Dash	6–1	Sky Blue FC
7	July 5, 2019	North Carolina Courage	5–2	Houston Dash
7	July 6, 2019	Orlando Pride	4–3	Washington Spirit
7	July 14, 2019	Portland Thorns FC	4–3	Orlando Pride
7	September 14, 2019	North Carolina Courage	6–1	Orlando Pride
7	June 19, 2022	North Carolina Courage	3-4	Houston Dash
7	July 10, 2022	Washington Spirit	4–3	San Diego Wave FC
7	April 22, 2023	OL Reign	5–2	Chicago Red Stars

== See also ==
- NWSL Shield
- NWSL awards
- List of NWSL drafts
- List of NWSL hat-tricks
- Women's soccer in the United States
