= 2024 Kansas City Current season =

Kansas City Current's fourth season

Kansas City Current
2024 season
- Owners: Angie Long; Chris Long; Brittany Mahomes; Patrick Mahomes
- President: Raven Jemison
- Head coach and Sporting Director: Vlatko Andonovski
- Stadium: CPKC Stadium (capacity: 11,500)
- 2024: 4th
- NWSL x Liga MX Femenil Summer Cup: Champions
- Playoffs: Semifinals
- Top goalscorer: League: Temwa Chawinga (20); All: Temwa Chawinga (21)
- Highest home attendance: 11,500
- Lowest home attendance: 11,500
- Average home league attendance: 11,500
- Biggest win: 3 goals (8 times)
- Biggest defeat: 1–4 (Aug 25 at WAS)
Home colors	Away colors
- All statistics correct as of November 17, 2024.

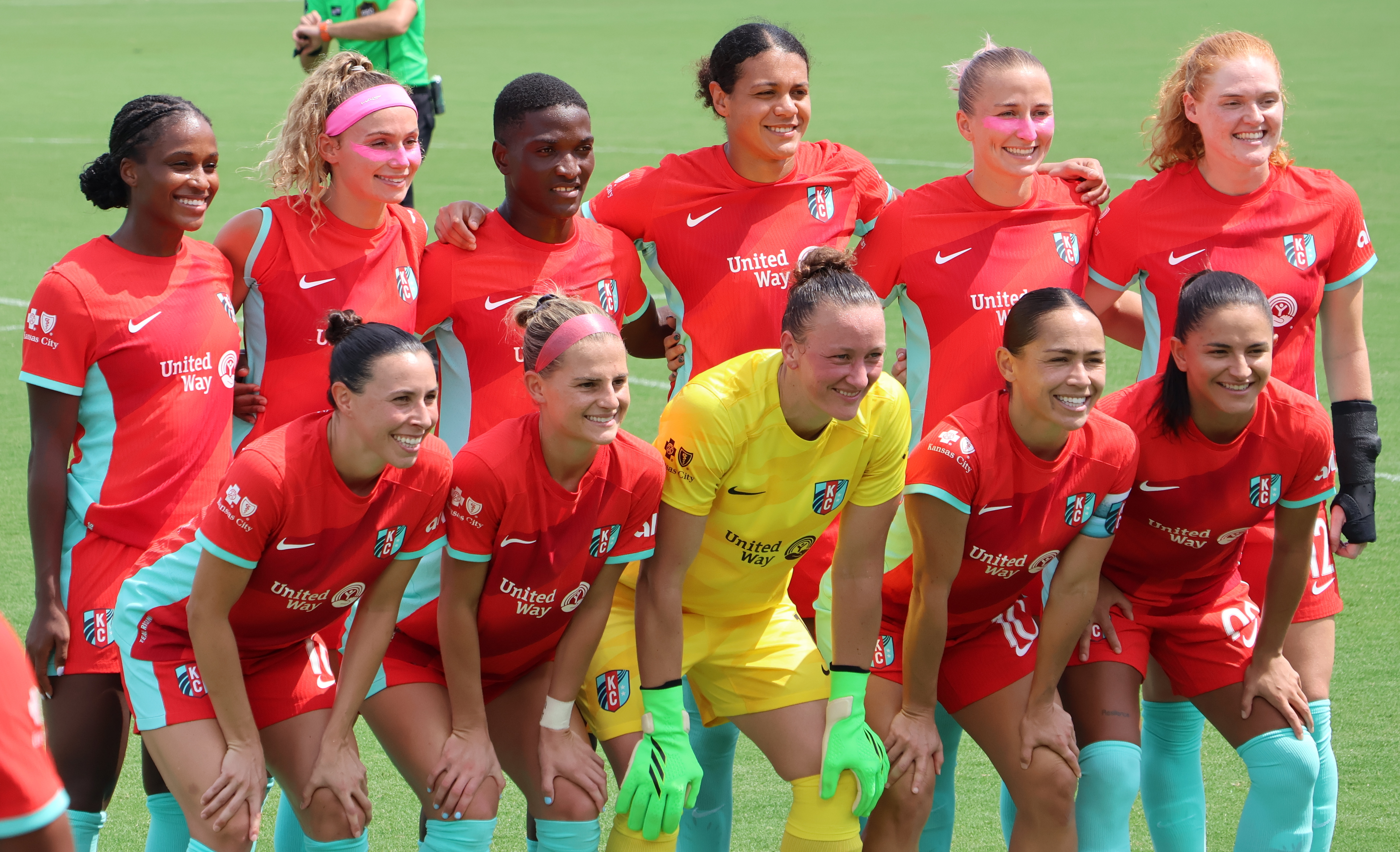
Week 18 starting lineup: Prince, Wheeler, Chawinga, Cook, Mace, Ballisager DiBernardo, Feist, Schult, LaBonta, Debinha

The 2024 Kansas City Current season was the team's fourth season as a professional soccer team. The Current played in the National Women's Soccer League (NWSL), the top tier of women's soccer in the United States.

The Current finished fourth in the 2024 National Women's Soccer League season and qualified for the NWSL playoffs as the fourth seed, where they defeated the fifth-seeded North Carolina Courage in the quarterfinals before losing to the top-seeded Orlando Pride in the semifinals.

== Background ==
Despite making it to the championship match in the 2022 season, the Current did not qualify for the 2023 playoffs. They ended the 2023 regular season 11th out of 12 teams. In 2021, they ended their inaugural season in last place.

== Summary ==
=== Draft, trades, and transfers ===
==== NWSL Draft ====
In the 2024 NWSL Draft, the KC Current drafted Ellie Wheeler from Penn State, Halle Mackiewicz from Clemson, and Hope Hisey from Arizona.

== Stadium and facilities ==
The KC Current began playing in their new home stadium, CPKC Stadium, the first stadium in the world stadium built solely for a women's professional sports team. The stadium has a seating capacity of 11,500 with additional standing-room capacity on its north-end. The stadium is located in the Berkley Riverfront of Kansas City along the banks of the Missouri River, the namesake of the team.

CPKC Stadium held its first match between the Kansas City Current and the Portland Thorns on March 16, 2024. Kansas City won the match 5–4 in front of a sell-out crowd.

The Current continue to train in their dedicated practice facility in Riverside, Missouri, which opened in June 2022. It was the first purpose-built practice facility for an NWSL team.

== Team ==
=== Technical staff ===
As of March 14, 2024.

General manager	Camille Levin Ashton
Head coach	Vlatko Andonovski
Assistant coach	Freya Coombe
Assistant coach	Lucas Rodríguez
Assistant coach	Milan Ivanovic
Goalkeeping coach	Ljupčo Kmetovski
Director of Performance	Garga Caserta
Head Strength Coach	Joseph Potts

=== Squad ===
As of March 14, 2024.

No.	Pos.	Nation	Player
2	DF	USA	Regan Steigleder
3	DF	SWE	Hanna Glas
4	DF	USA	Hailie Mace
5	DF	USA	Ellie Wheeler
6	FW	MWI	Temwa Chawinga
7	DF	USA	Elizabeth Ball
8	FW	CAN	Nichelle Prince
9	FW	BRA	Bia Zaneratto
10	MF	USA	Lo'eau LaBonta
11	MF	CAN	Desiree Scott
12	DF	DEN	Stine Ballisager Pedersen
13	MF	ARG	Sophia Braun
14	MF	USA	Claire Hutton
16	MF	USA	Vanessa DiBernardo
17	FW	USA	Michelle Cooper
18	DF	USA	Izzy Rodriguez
20	DF	USA	Mallory Weber
21	GK	USA	Adrianna Franch
22	MF	USA	Bayley Feist
24	DF	USA	Gabrielle Robinson
25	FW	USA	Kristen Hamilton
29	GK	USA	Jordan Silkowitz
30	GK	USA	Hope Hisey
47	FW	USA	Alex Pfeiffer
77	FW	USA	Alexa Spaanstra
78	DF	BRA	Lauren
94	MF	FRA	Claire Lavogez
99	MF	BRA	Debinha

== Competitions ==
=== Regular season ===
==== Matches ====
March 16, 2024 1	Kansas City Current	5–4	Portland Thorns FC	Kansas City, Missouri
12:00 p.m. CDT	DiBernardo 22'; Wheeler 25'; Bia 34'; Hamilton 64'; Pfeiffer 68'	Report	Smith 43', 74'; Beckie 71', 90+1'; Sugita (yellow card) 79'; Hubly (yellow card) 85'	Stadium: CPKC Stadium; Attendance: 11,500*; Referee: Alex Billeter

March 23, 2024 2	San Diego Wave FC	1–2	Kansas City Current	San Diego, California
7:00 p.m. PDT	Jakobsson 17'	Report	Hutton (yellow card) 24'; Rodriguez 44'; LaBonta 71'; Lavogez (yellow card) 90+9'	Stadium: Snapdragon Stadium; Attendance: 32,066

March 30, 2024 3	Kansas City Current	4–2	Angel City FC	Kansas City, Missouri
2:30 p.m. CDT	DiBernardo 6'; Wheeler (yellow card) 40'; Spaanstra 45+3'; Chawinga 51'; Bia 90+2'	Report	Leroux 50'; Nielsen (yellow card) 75'; Curry 78'; Emslie (yellow card) 90+6'	Stadium: CPKC Stadium; Attendance: 11,500*

April 14, 2024 4	NJ/NY Gotham FC	1–1	Kansas City Current	Harrison, New Jersey
6:00 p.m. EDT	Martin (yellow card) 34'; Gonzalez 51'	Report	Chawinga 17'; Lavogez (yellow card) 71'	Stadium: Red Bull Arena; Attendance: 8,573

April 20, 2024 5	Kansas City Current	5–2	Bay FC	Kansas City, Missouri
6:30 p.m. CDT	Bia 2', 73'; Feist 6'; Chawinga 56' 62'	Report	Sharples 17', (yellow card) 23'; Boade 78'; Princess (yellow card) 87'	Stadium: CPKC Stadium; Attendance: 11,500*

April 26, 2024 6	Angel City FC	1–3	Kansas City Current	Los Angeles, California
9:00 p.m. CDT	Emslie 34'; Hammond (yellow card) 55'; Reid (yellow card) 77'	Report	Hutton (yellow card) 28'; DiBernardo 54'; Cooper (yellow card) 85'; Lavogez 90', 90+3'; Robinson (yellow card) 90+7'	Stadium: BMO Stadium; Attendance: 19,178; Referee: Ekaterina Koroleva

May 5, 2024 7	Houston Dash	1–1	Kansas City Current	Houston, Texas
12:00 p.m. CDT	Bachmann (yellow card) 61'; West 71'	Report	Chawinga 24'	Stadium: Shell Energy Stadium; Attendance: 5,099; Referee: Calin Radosav

May 8, 2024 8	Seattle Reign FC	0–0	Kansas City Current	Seattle, Washington
9:00 p.m. CDT		Report		Stadium: Lumen Field; Attendance: 5,083; Referee: Anya Voigt

May 12, 2024 9	Kansas City Current	1–0	North Carolina Courage	Kansas City, Missouri
5:00 p.m. CDT	DiBernardo (yellow card) 51'; Debinha 52'	Report	Rauch (yellow card) 90'	Stadium: CPKC Stadium; Attendance: 11,500*; Referee: Adam Kilpatrick

May 18, 2024 10	Kansas City Current	3–3	Racing Louisville FC	Kansas City, Missouri
8:30 p.m. CDT	Rodriguez (yellow card) 12'; Mace (yellow card) 33'; LaBonta 45+3' (pen.); Cooper 56'; Robinson (yellow card) 72', (goal) 90+2'	Report	Sears 18'; Fischer (yellow card) 23'; Erceg 68'; Flint (yellow card) 89'; DeMelo 90+13'	Stadium: CPKC Stadium; Attendance: 11,500*; Referee: Nabil Bensalah

May 25, 2024 11	Utah Royals FC	0–1	Kansas City Current	Salt Lake City, Utah
9:00 p.m. CDT	Tejada (yellow card) 3'	Report	Ball 58'; Spaanstra (yellow card) 90+6'; Mace (yellow card) 90+9'	Stadium: America First Field; Attendance: 7,491; Referee: Danielle Chesky

June 9, 2024 12	Kansas City Current	5–2	Seattle Reign FC	Kansas City, Missouri
5:00 p.m. CDT	Chawinga 28', 47'; Lauren 45+2'; DiBernardo 46'; LaBonta 67' (pen.)	Report	Huitema 24', 41'; Ivory (yellow card) 66'	Stadium: CPKC Stadium; Attendance: 11,500*; Referee: Brad Jensen

June 14, 2024 13	Kansas City Current	2–2	Chicago Red Stars	Kansas City, Missouri
7:00 p.m. CDT	Bia 51'; Chawinga 58'; Mace (yellow card) 72'	Report	Swanson 6'; Staab 90'; Curran (yellow card) 90+3'	Stadium: CPKC Stadium; Attendance: 11,500*; Referee: Gerald Flores

June 23, 2024 14	Portland Thorns FC	1–4	Kansas City Current	Portland, Oregon
3:00 p.m. CDT	Hubly (yellow card) 62'; Smith 73'	Report	LaBonta 30', 40'; Ballisager 38'; Chawinga 47'	Stadium: Providence Park; Attendance: 20,024; Referee: Brandon Stevis

June 28, 2024 15	Kansas City Current	2–0	Houston Dash	Kansas City, Missouri
7:00 p.m. CDT	Chawinga 77', 80'	Report	Puntigam (yellow card) 75'	Stadium: CPKC Stadium; Attendance: 11,500*; Referee: Katherine McCormick

July 6, 2024 16	Kansas City Current	1–2	Orlando Pride	Kansas City, Missouri
6:30 p.m. CDT	Hutton (yellow card) 28'; Chawinga 39'; LaBonta (yellow card) 47'; Mace (yellow card) 57'; Franch (yellow card) 61'	Report	Lawrence (yellow card) 14' (yellow-red card) 42'; Marta (yellow card) 23', (goal) 63'; Banda 37'	Stadium: CPKC Stadium; Attendance: 11,500*; Referee: Joshua Encarnacion

August 25, 2024 17	Washington Spirit	4–1	Kansas City Current	Washington, D.C.
11:00 a.m. CDT	Metayer 9'; Sarr 14'; Rodman 51'; Santos 73'; Ratcliffe (yellow card) 90+5'	Report	DiBernardo (yellow card) 48'; Chawinga 64'; Cook (yellow card) 71'; LaBonta (yellow card) 84'	Stadium: Audi Field; Referee: Brad Jensen

September 1, 2024 18	North Carolina Courage	2–1	Kansas City Current	Cary, North Carolina
1:00 p.m. CDT	Vine 67'; Kurtz (yellow card) 74'; Pinto 90+2'	Report	Chawinga 62'	Stadium: WakeMed Soccer Park; Attendance: 6,003; Referee: Elvis Osmanovic

September 7, 2024 19	Kansas City Current	1–0	Utah Royals FC	Kansas City, Missouri
6:30 p.m. CDT	Chawinga 47'	Report		Stadium: CPKC Stadium; Attendance: 11,500*; Referee: Calin Radosav

September 13, 2024 20	Orlando Pride	0–0	Kansas City Current	Orlando, Florida
6:00 p.m. CDT		Report		Stadium: Exploria Stadium; Attendance: 9,396; Referee: Alyssa Nichols

September 20, 2024 21	Kansas City Current	3–0	Washington Spirit	Kansas City, Missouri
7:00 p.m. CDT	Prince 3'; LaBonta 30'; Chawinga 68'	Report; Box	Silano (red card) 90+7'	Stadium: CPKC Stadium; Attendance: 11,500*; Referee: Matthew Thompson

September 28, 2024 22	Kansas City Current	1–1	NJ/NY Gotham FC	Kansas City, Missouri
12:00 p.m. CDT	Chawinga 51', (yellow card) 80'	Report	Cook 15' (o.g.); Martin (yellow card) 14'	Stadium: CPKC Stadium; Attendance: 11,500*; Referee: Katja Koroleva

October 5, 2024 23	Racing Louisville FC	0–2	Kansas City Current	Louisville, Kentucky
6:30 p.m. CDT		Report	Chawinga 2'; DiBernardo 86'	Stadium: Lynn Family Stadium; Attendance: 6,013; Referee: Matthew Corrigan

October 12, 2024 24	Bay FC	0–1	Kansas City Current	San Jose, California
9:00 p.m. CDT	Hocking (yellow card) 33'; Oshoala (yellow card) 35'	Report	Chawinga 34'; Mace (yellow card) 40'; DiBernardo (yellow card) 90+2'; Wheeler (yellow card) 90+4'	Stadium: PayPal Park; Referee: Danielle Chesky

October 19, 2024 25	Kansas City Current	4–1	San Diego Wave FC	Kansas City, Missouri
12:00 p.m. CDT	Cooper 17'; Sheridan 30' (o.g.); Chawinga 53'; Debinha 79'	Report; Report	Morroni (yellow card) 66'; Cascarino 87'	Stadium: CPKC Stadium; Attendance: 11,500*; Referee: Iryna Petrunok

November 3, 2024 26	Chicago Red Stars	1–3	Kansas City Current	Chicago, Illinois
12:00 p.m. CST	Schlegel 52'	Report	Cooper 23'; Debinha 26'; Prince 33'; Magaia (yellow card) 81'	Stadium: SeatGeek Stadium; Attendance: 5,595; Referee: Jaclyn Metz

Note: * Indicates a sell-out crowd

Last updated: November 3, 2024.
Source: NWSLsoccer.com

==== Regular season standings ====
Pos	Team	Pld	W	D	L	GF	GA	GD	Pts	Qualification
2	Washington Spirit	26	18	2	6	51	28	+23	56	Playoffs, and CONCACAF W Champions Cup
3	NJ/NY Gotham FC	26	17	5	4	41	20	+21	56	Playoffs, and CONCACAF W Champions Cup (Note: With Orlando Pride winning both the 2024 National Women's Soccer League Championship and 2024 National Women's Soccer League Shield, the third qualifying spot for the United States went to the next best club in 2024 National Women's Soccer League Shield standings not already qualified, Gotham FC.)
4	Kansas City Current	26	16	7	3	57	31	+26	55	Playoffs
5	North Carolina Courage	26	12	3	11	34	28	+6	39	Playoffs
6	Portland Thorns FC	26	10	4	12	37	35	+2	34	Playoffs

Source: NWSL
Rules for classification: Tiebreakers

==== Results summary ====
Overall								Home						Away					
Pld	W	D	L	GF	GA	GD	Pts	W	D	L	GF	GA	GD	W	D	L	GF	GA	GD
26	16	7	3	57	31	+26	55	9	3	1	37	19	+18	7	4	2	20	12	+8

Last updated: November 3, 2024.
Source: NWSLsoccer.com

==== Results by matchday ====
Matchday	1	2	3	4	5	6	7	8	9	10	11	12	13	14	15	16	17	18	19	20	21	22	23	24	25	26
Stadium	H	A	H	A	H	A	A	A	H	H	A	H	H	A	H	H	A	A	H	A	H	H	A	A	H	A
Result	W	W	W	D	W	W	D	D	W	D	W	W	D	W	W	L	L	L	W	D	W	D	W	W	W	W
Position	3	2	1	1	1	1	1	1	1	2	2	1	1	1	1	2	3	3	3	3	4	4	4	4	4	4

Updated to match(es) played on November 3, 2024. Source: NWSL
A = Away; H = Home; W = Win; D = Draw; L = Loss

=== Playoffs ===
The Current finished the regular season in fourth place and qualified for the NWSL playoffs as the fourth seed of eight teams.

==== Matches ====
November 9, 2024 Quarterfinals	Kansas City Current	1–0	North Carolina Courage	Kansas City, Missouri
11:00 a.m. CST (UTC−6)	Chawinga 8'; LaBonta (yellow card) 28'; Wheeler (yellow card) 90+8'	Report	O'Sullivan (yellow card) 36'; St-Georges (yellow card) 90+8'	Stadium: CPKC Stadium; Referee: Brad Jensen

November 17, 2024 Semifinals	Orlando Pride	3–2	Kansas City Current	Orlando, Florida
3:00 p.m. EST (UTC−5)	Angelina (yellow card) 28'; McCutcheon 41' (yellow card) 90+13'; Banda 53'; Moorhouse (yellow card) 81'; Marta 82'	Report	Debinha 33'; Mace (yellow card) 55'; Sharples (yellow card) 90+9'; DiBernardo 90+13' (pen.)	Stadium: Inter&Co Stadium; Attendance: 14,524; Referee: Danielle Chesky

=== NWSL x Liga MX Femenil Summer Cup ===
Pos	Team	Pld	W	PW	PL	L	GF	GA	GD	Pts	Qualification	KC	HOU	TIG	PAC
1	(United States Soccer Federation) Kansas City Current	3	3	0	0	0	10	2	+8	9	Advances to knockout stage	—	3–1	4–1	3–0
2	(United States Soccer Federation) Houston Dash	3	2	0	0	1	5	4	+1	6		1–3	—	2–1	2–0
3	(Mexican Football Federation) Tigres UANL	3	1	0	0	2	6	8	−2	3		1–4	1–2	—	4–2
4	(Mexican Football Federation) Pachuca	3	0	0	0	3	2	9	−7	0		0–3	0–2	2–4	—

Source: NWSL
Rules for classification: tiebreakers

July 20, 2024 1	Kansas City Current (United States)	3–1	(United States) Houston Dash	Kansas City, Missouri
7:00 p.m. CDT (UTC-5)	Cooper 1'; LaBonta 68'; Hamilton 83'	Report	Nagasato 20'; Olivieri (yellow card) 22'; Chapman (yellow card) 67'; Schmidt (yellow card) 86'	Stadium: CPKC Stadium; Referee: Corbyn May

July 27, 2024 2	Kansas City Current (United States)	3–0	(Mexico) C.F. Pachuca	Kansas City, Missouri
7:00 p.m. CDT (UTC-5)	Debinha 12', 28'; Hamilton 32'	Report	Díaz (yellow card) 36'; Ibarra (yellow card) 67'; Valadez (yellow card) 77'	Stadium: CPKC Stadium; Referee: Katarzyna Waslak

August 1, 2024 3	Kansas City Current (United States)	4–1	(Mexico) Tigres UANL	Kansas City, Missouri
7:00 p.m. CDT (UTC-5)	LaBonta 23'; Wheeler 29', (yellow card) 37'; Debinha 57'; Hutton 79'	Report	Villarreal (yellow card) 22'; Reyes (yellow card) 44'; Kgatlana 56'; Rangel (yellow card) 67'	Stadium: CPKC Stadium; Referee: Matt Geringer

August 6, 2024 SF	Kansas City Current (United States)	2–0	(United States) North Carolina Courage	Kansas City, Missouri
	Chawinga 2'; Debinha 78'	Report		Stadium: CPKC Stadium; Referee: Katja Koroleva

October 25, 2024 F	NJ/NY Gotham FC (United States)	0–2	(United States) Kansas City Current	San Antonio, Texas
	Bruninha (yellow card) 28'; Stevens (yellow card) 48'	Report	Chawinga 24', 37'; Cooper (yellow card) 43'; Ball (yellow card) 82'	Stadium: Toyota Field; Referee: Alyssa Nichols

== Squad statistics ==
As of Match played November 17, 2024

=== Appearances ===
Only players who have made an appearance are listed. Starting appearances are listed first, followed by substitute appearances after the + symbol where applicable.

No.	Pos	Nat	Player	Total		NWSL		Playoffs		Summer Cup	
No.	Pos	Nat	Player	Apps	Goals	Apps	Goals	Apps	Goals	Apps	Goals
Goalkeepers
1	GK	(Germany) GER	Almuth Schult	12	0	9	0	2	0	1	0
21	GK	(United States) USA	Adrianna Franch	21	0	17	0	0	0	4	0
Defenders
2	DF	(United States) USA	Regan Steigleder	7	0	1+2	0	0	0	1+3	0
4	DF	(United States) USA	Hailie Mace	29	0	20+3	0	2	0	4	0
5	DF	(United States) USA	Ellie Wheeler	30	2	14+9	1	2	0	5	1
7	DF	(United States) USA	Elizabeth Ball	20	1	12+7	1	0	0	0+1	0
12	DF	(Denmark) DEN	Stine Ballisager Pedersen	22	1	11+7	1	0+1	0	3	0
15	DF	(United States) USA	Alana Cook	15	0	10	0	2	0	3	0
18	DF	(United States) USA	Izzy Rodriguez	25	1	18+3	1	0+1	0	2+1	0
24	DF	(United States) USA	Gabrielle Robinson	11	1	11	1	0	0	0	0
27	DF	(United States) USA	Kayla Sharples	11	0	8	0	2	0	1	0
Midfielders
10	MF	(United States) USA	Lo'eau LaBonta	31	8	21+3	6	2	0	5	2
11	MF	(Canada) CAN	Desiree Scott	14	0	0+11	0	0+1	0	0+2	0
14	MF	(United States) USA	Claire Hutton	29	1	19+3	0	2	0	3+2	1
16	MF	(United States) USA	Vanessa DiBernardo	30	6	20+3	5	2	1	5	0
22	MF	(United States) USA	Bayley Feist	23	1	6+10	1	0+2	0	2+3	0
33	MF	(Kenya) KEN	Mwanalima Adam Jereko	4	0	0+3	0	0	0	0+1	0
99	MF	(Brazil) BRA	Debinha	29	8	17+5	3	2	1	5	4
Forwards
6	FW	(Malawi) MWI	Temwa Chawinga	30	24	24+1	20	2	1	3	3
8	FW	(Canada) CAN	Nichelle Prince	15	2	9+4	2	0+2	0	0	0
9	FW	(Brazil) BRA	Bia Zaneratto	16	5	11+5	5	0	0	0	0
17	FW	(United States) USA	Michelle Cooper	28	4	15+6	3	2	0	5	1
25	FW	(United States) USA	Kristen Hamilton	8	3	0+3	1	0+1	0	2+2	2
47	FW	(United States) USA	Alex Pfeiffer	10	1	0+10	1	0	0	0	0
66	FW	(South Africa) RSA	Hildah Magaia	6	0	0+6	0	0	0	0	0
Players who appeared for the club but left during the season:
3	DF	(Sweden) SWE	Hanna Glas	1	0	0	0	0	0	1	0
31	MF	(United States) USA	Allie Long	1	0	0	0	0	0	0+1	0
32	MF	(United States) USA	Grace Bahr	1	0	0	0	0	0	0+1	0
43	MF	(Philippines) PHI	Janae DeFazio	1	0	0	0	0	0	0+1	0
77	FW	(United States) USA	Alexa Spaanstra	15	1	8+3	1	0	0	0+4	0
78	DF	(Brazil) BRA	Lauren	3	1	1+2	1	0	0	0	0
94	MF	(France) FRA	Claire Lavogez	16	2	4+10	2	0	0	0+2	0

=== Goals ===
Rank	No.	Pos.	Nat.	Name	NWSL	Playoffs	Summer Cup	Total
1	6	FW	(Malawi)	Temwa Chawinga	20	1	3	24
2	10	MF	(United States)	Lo'eau LaBonta	6	0	2	8
3	99	MF	(Brazil)	Debinha	3	1	4	8
4	16	MF	(United States)	Vanessa DiBernardo	5	1	0	6
5	9	FW	(Brazil)	Bia Zaneratto	5	0	0	5
6	17	FW	(United States)	Michelle Cooper	3	0	1	4
7	25	FW	(United States)	Kristen Hamilton	1	0	2	3
8	8	FW	(Canada)	Nichelle Prince	2	0	0	2
8	94	MF	(France)	Claire Lavogez	2	0	0	2
9	5	DF	(United States)	Ellie Wheeler	1	0	1	2
10	7	DF	(United States)	Elizabeth Ball	1	0	0	1
10	12	DF	(Denmark)	Stine Ballisager Pedersen	1	0	0	1
10	22	MF	(United States)	Bayley Feist	1	0	0	1
10	78	DF	(Brazil)	Lauren	1	0	0	1
10	47	FW	(United States)	Alex Pfeiffer	1	0	0	1
10	24	DF	(United States)	Gabrielle Robinson	1	0	0	1
10	18	DF	(United States)	Izzy Rodriguez	1	0	0	1
10	77	FW	(United States)	Alexa Spaanstra	1	0	0	1
11	14	MF	(United States)	Claire Hutton	0	0	1	1
Own goals					1	0	0	1
Total					57	3	14	74

=== Assists ===
Rank	No.	Pos.	Nat.	Name	NWSL	Playoffs	Summer Cup	Total
1	16	MF	(United States)	Vanessa DiBernardo	6	0	2	8
2	99	MF	(Brazil)	Debinha	6	0	0	6
3	6	FW	(Malawi)	Temwa Chawinga	5	0	1	6
4	9	FW	(Brazil)	Bia Zaneratto	4	0	0	4
5	17	FW	(United States)	Michelle Cooper	2	1	1	4
6	7	DF	(United States)	Elizabeth Ball	3	0	0	3
7	18	DF	(United States)	Izzy Rodriguez	2	0	1	3
8	10	MF	(United States)	Lo'eau LaBonta	1	0	2	3
9	8	FW	(Canada)	Nichelle Prince	2	0	0	2
10	25	FW	(United States)	Kristen Hamilton	0	0	2	2
11	14	MF	(United States)	Claire Hutton	1	0	0	1
11	4	DF	(United States)	Hailie Mace	1	0	0	1
11	77	FW	(United States)	Alexa Spaanstra	1	0	0	1
12	22	MF	(United States)	Bayley Feist	0	0	1	1
12	3	DF	(Sweden)	Hanna Glas	0	0	1	1
Total					34	1	11	46

=== Clean sheets ===
Rank	No.	Nat.	Name	NWSL	Playoffs	Summer Cup	Total
1	1	(Germany)	Almuth Schult	5	1	1	7
2	21	(United States)	Adrianna Franch	4	0	2	6
Total				9	1	3	13

=== Disciplinary record ===
No.	Pos.	Nat.	Name	NWSL			Playoffs			Summer Cup			Total		
No.	Pos.	Nat.	Name	Booked	(yellow card) (yellow-red card)	Sent off (straight red)	Booked	(yellow card) (yellow-red card)	Sent off (straight red)	Booked	(yellow card) (yellow-red card)	Sent off (straight red)	Booked	(yellow card) (yellow-red card)	Sent off (straight red)
4	DF	(United States)	Hailie Mace	5	0	0	1	0	0	0	0	0	6	0	0
5	DF	(United States)	Ellie Wheeler	2	0	0	1	0	0	1	0	0	4	0	0
6	FW	(Malawi)	Temwa Chawinga	1	0	0	0	0	0	0	0	0	1	0	0
7	DF	(United States)	Elizabeth Ball	0	0	0	0	0	0	1	0	0	1	0	0
10	MF	(United States)	Lo'eau LaBonta	2	0	0	1	0	0	0	0	0	3	0	0
14	MF	(United States)	Claire Hutton	3	0	0	0	0	0	0	0	0	3	0	0
15	DF	(United States)	Alana Cook	1	0	0	0	0	0	0	0	0	1	0	0
16	MF	(United States)	Vanessa DiBernardo	3	0	0	0	0	0	0	0	0	3	0	0
17	FW	(United States)	Michelle Cooper	2	0	0	0	0	0	1	0	0	3	0	0
18	DF	(United States)	Izzy Rodriguez	1	0	0	0	0	0	0	0	0	1	0	0
21	GK	(United States)	Adrianna Franch	1	0	0	0	0	0	0	0	0	1	0	0
24	DF	(United States)	Gabrielle Robinson	2	0	0	0	0	0	0	0	0	2	0	0
27	DF	(United States)	Kayla Sharples	0	0	0	1	0	0	0	0	0	1	0	0
66	FW	(South Africa)	Hildah Magaia	1	0	0	0	0	0	0	0	0	1	0	0
77	FW	(United States)	Alexa Spaanstra	1	0	0	0	0	0	0	0	0	1	0	0
94	MF	(France)	Claire Lavogez	2	0	0	0	0	0	0	0	0	2	0	0
Total				27	0	0	4	0	0	3	0	0	34	0	0

== Transactions ==
=== 2024 NWSL Draft ===
Draft selections are not automatically signed to the team roster. The 2024 NWSL Draft was held on January 12, 2024, in Anaheim, California.

2024 NWSL Draft selections, by round
R	P	Nat.	Player	Pos.	College	Status	Ref.
2	18	(United States) USA	Ellie Wheeler	DF	Pennsylvania State University	Signed to a one-year contract with an option.	
3	32	(United States) USA	Halle Mackiewicz	GK	Clemson University	Not signed.	
4	46	(United States) USA	Hope Hisey	GK	University of Arizona	Signed to a one-year contract with an option.	

=== Contract operations ===
Contract options
Date	Nat.	Player	Pos.	Notes	Ref.
November 20, 2023	(France) FRA	Claire Lavogez	MF	Option exercised.	

Re-signings
Date	Nat.	Player	Pos.	Notes	Ref.
November 13, 2023	(United States) USA	Gabrielle Robinson	DF	Re-signed to a three-year contract.	
December 13, 2023	(United States) USA	Izzy Rodriguez	DF	Re-signed to a two-year contract.	
January 23, 2024	(United States) USA	Cassie Miller	GK	Free agent re-signed to a one-year contract.	
January 24, 2024	(Canada) CAN	Desiree Scott	MF	Free agent re-signed to a one-year contract.	
January 29, 2024	(United States) USA	Mallory Weber	DF	Free agent re-signed to a one-year contract.	
January 31, 2024	(United States) USA	Lo'eau LaBonta	MF	Re-signed to a two-year contract	

=== Loans ===
Loans in
Date	Nat.	Player	Pos.	Previous team	Fee/notes	Ref.
August 21, 2024	(South Africa) RSA	Hildah Magaia	FW	(Mexico) Mazatlán	Loaned through the end of the 2024 NWSL season. Kansas City have the option to acquire player rights on a permanent basis at the end of the loan.	

Loans out
Date	Nat.	Player	Pos.	Destination team	Fee/notes	Ref.
September 13, 2023	(United States) USA	Jordan Silkowitz	GK	(Australia) Brisbane Roar FC	Loaned through April 2024. (Note: Recalled from loan on March 8, 2024.)	
July 19, 2024	(Argentina) ARG	Sophia Braun	MF	(United States) Spokane Zephyr FC	Loaned through the end of the 2024 NWSL season.	
November 15, 2024	(Nigeria) NGA	Opeyemi Ajakaye	FW	(United States) Carolina Ascent FC	Loaned through the end of the 2024 USL Super League fall schedule.	

=== Transfers ===
Transfers in
Date	Nat.	Player	Pos.	Previous team	Fee/notes	Ref.
October 30, 2023	(United States) USA	Alex Pfeiffer	FW	(United States) St. Louis Scott Gallagher	Signed with NWSL Under-18 Entry Mechanism to a three-year contract.	
December 14, 2023	(United States) USA	Claire Hutton	MF	(United States) World Class FC	Signed with NWSL Under-18 Entry Mechanism to a three-year contract.	
January 3, 2024	(Malawi) MWI	Temwa Chawinga	FW	(China) Wuhan Jianghan University	Signed to a two-year contract.	
January 17, 2024	(Canada) CAN	Nichelle Prince	FW	(United States) Houston Dash	Traded in exchange for Cece Kizer and a 2024 international roster slot.	
January 22, 2024	(Brazil) BRA	Bia Zaneratto	FW	(Brazil) Palmeiras	Signed to a one-year contract with a club option.	
January 22, 2024	(United States) USA	Bayley Feist	MF	(United States) Washington Spirit	Free agent signed to a two-year contract.	
January 30, 2024	(Argentina) ARG	Sophie Braun	MF	(Mexico) Club León	Signed to a one-year contract with an option.	
January 30, 2024	(United States) USA	Regan Steigleder	DF	(Sweden) KIF Örebro DFF	Acquired in exchange for an undisclosed transfer fee and signed to a one-year contract with an option.	
July 18, 2024	(United States) USA	Grace Bahr	MF	(United States) Indy Eleven	Signed to a national team replacement contract.	
July 22, 2024	(United States) USA	Alana Cook	DF	(United States) Seattle Reign FC	Traded in exchange for $40,000 in allocation money, $75,000 in intra-league transfer funds, and a conditional $25,000 in intra-league transfer funds pending incentive-based requirements.	
July 26, 2024	(Philippines) PHI	Janae DeFazio	MF	(United States) UCLA Bruins	Signed to national team replacement contracts.	
July 26, 2024	(United States) USA	Sabrina Weinman	MF	(United States) Northern Colorado Rain	Signed to national team replacement contracts.	
July 27, 2024	(United States) USA	Allie Long	MF	(United States) NJ/NY Gotham FC	Signed to an injury replacement contract.	
August 2, 2024	(Germany) GER	Almuth Schult	GK	(Germany) Hamburger SV	Signed to a one-year contract.	
August 16, 2024	(Kenya) KEN	Mwanalima Adam Jereko	MF	(Turkey) Hakkarigücü Spor	Signed to a two-year contract through 2025 with an option.	
August 28, 2024	(United States) USA	Kayla Sharples	DF	(United States) Bay FC	Traded in exchange for Jordan Silkowitz and $15,000 in allocation money.	
September 13, 2024	(United States) USA	Katie Fraine	GK	(Scotland) Hibernian	Signed to a one-year contract through the remainder of 2024.	
November 15, 2024	(Nigeria) NGA	Opeyemi Ajakaye	FW	(Spain) Madrid CFF	International signing acquired prior to the NWSL roster freeze.	

Transfers out
Date	Nat.	Player	Pos.	Destination team	Fee/notes	Ref.
November 15, 2023	(United States) USA	Alex Loera	MF	(United States) Bay FC	Traded in exchange for $175,000 in allocation money and protection in the 2024 NWSL expansion draft.	
November 20, 2023	(United States) USA	Rylan Childers	MF	(United States) Odense Boldklub Q	Waived.	
November 20, 2023	(United States) USA	Chardonnay Curran	MF	(United States) Chicago Red Stars	Waived.	
November 20, 2023	(United States) USA	Croix Soto	DF	(United States) Houston Dash	Waived.	
November 20, 2023	(United States) USA	Jenna Winebrenner	DF	(United States) North Carolina Courage	Waived.	
November 20, 2023	(United States) USA	Addisyn Merrick	DF	(United States) Utah Royals	Free agents.	
November 20, 2023	(United States) USA	Sam Mewis	MF	Retired	Free agents.	
December 12, 2023	(United States) USA	Kate Del Fava	DF	(United States) Utah Royals	Traded, along with Kansas City's natural first-round pick in the 2024 NWSL Draft, in exchange for $75,000 in allocation money and protection in the 2024 NWSL expansion draft.	
January 11, 2024	(United States) USA	Morgan Gautrat	MF	(United States) Orlando Pride	Traded, along with $50,000 in allocation money, in exchange for a 2024 international roster spot.	
January 17, 2024	(United States) USA	Cece Kizer	FW	(United States) Houston Dash	Traded, along with a 2024 international roster spot, in exchange for Nichelle Prince.	
January 23, 2024	(United States) USA	Cassie Miller	GK	(United States) NJ/NY Gotham FC	Traded in exchange for $70,000 in allocation money and $30,000 in intra-league transfer funds.	
January 26, 2024	(Sweden) SWE	Mimmi Larsson	FW	(Germany) RB Leipzig	Mutual contract termination.	
August 2, 2024	(United States) USA	Hope Hisey	GK	(United States) Spokane Zephyr FC	Waived.	
August 12, 2024	(France) FRA	Claire Lavogez	MF	(Spain) Real Sociedad	Mutual contract termination.	
August 19, 2024	(United States) USA	Alexa Spaanstra	FW	(United States) Portland Thorns FC	Traded in exchange for $15,000 in allocation money and $25,000 in intra-league transfer funds.	
August 21, 2024	(Brazil) BRA	Lauren	DF	(Spain) Atlético Madrid	Free transfer.	
August 28, 2024	(United States) USA	Jordan Silkowitz	GK	(United States) Bay FC	Traded, along with $15,000 of allocation money, in exchange for Kayla Sharples.	
September 2, 2024	(Sweden) SWE	Hanna Glas	DF	(United States) Seattle Reign FC	Traded in exchange for $10,000 of intra-league transfer funds and an additional $10,000 of transfer funds pending conditions met.	
