= Alex Pfeiffer (soccer) =

American soccer player (born 2007)

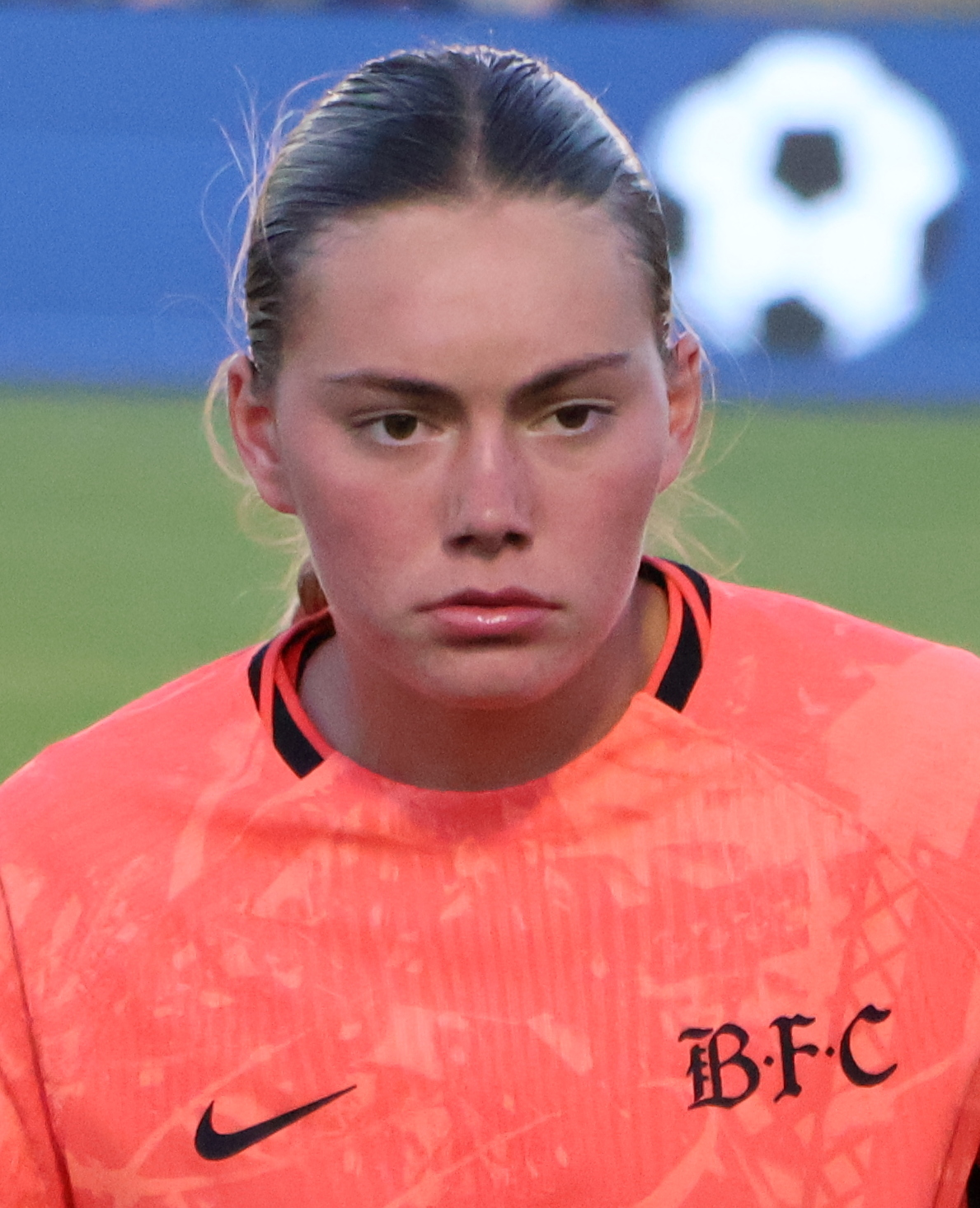
- Pfeiffer with Bay FC in 2026

Personal information
- Full name: Alexandra Mackenzie Pfeiffer
- Date of birth: November 26, 2007 (age 18)
- Height: 5 ft 5 in (1.65 m)
- Position: Right winger

Team information
- Current team: Bay FC
- Number: 17

Youth career
- St. Louis Scott Gallagher

Senior career*
Years	Team	Apps	(Gls)
2024–2025	Kansas City Current	14	(1)
2026–	Bay FC	20	(3)

International career
2024	United States U-17	5	(6)
2025–	United States U-20	2	(2)
- * Club domestic league appearances and goals as of 05:09, November 2, 2026 (UTC)

Alexandra Mackenzie Pfeiffer (born November 26, 2007) is an American professional soccer player who plays as a right winger for Bay FC of the National Women's Soccer League (NWSL). She signed with the Kansas City Current at age 15 in 2023, becoming the youngest goalscorer in NWSL history at the time. She has represented the United States at the youth international level.

== Early life ==
Pfeiffer grew up in St. Louis, Missouri, the daughter of Kate and Brian Pfeiffer. She played club soccer for St. Louis Scott Gallagher, winning two consecutive ECNL national titles and being named ECNL All-American twice and the ECNL U17 Player of the Year in 2023.

== Club career ==
=== Kansas City Current ===
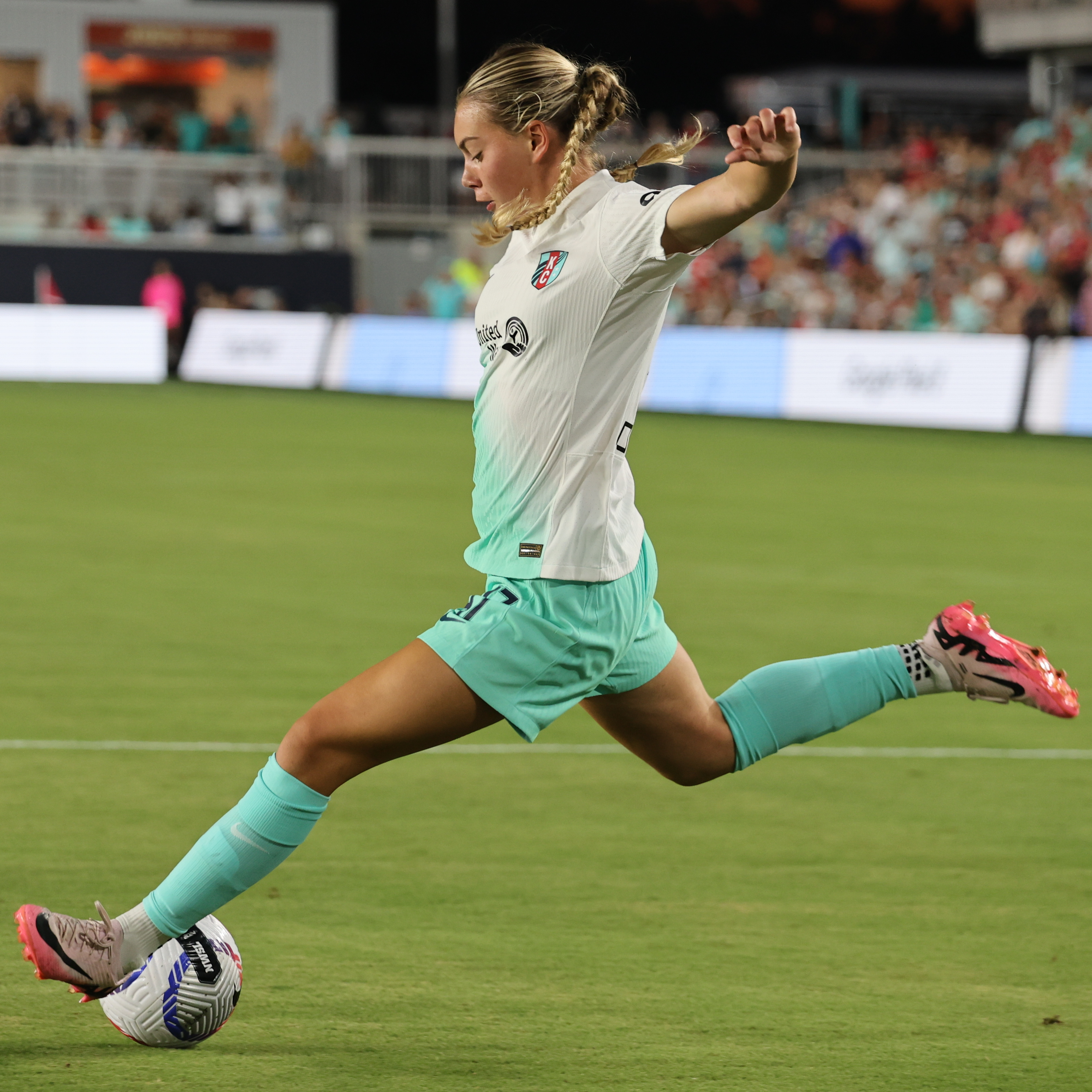
Pfeiffer with the Kansas City Current in 2024

On October 30, 2023, the Kansas City Current announced that the club had signed Pfeiffer to a three-year contract under the NWSL Under-18 Entry Mechanism, making her the fourth-youngest signing in NWSL history at 15 years and 338 days old. She made her professional debut on March 16, 2024, scoring the Current's fifth goal in their season-opening 5–4 win over Portland Thorns to inaugurate the newly built CPKC Stadium. She was the youngest goal scorer in NWSL history at the time at 16 years, 3 months, and 20 days old. On July 28, she tore the anterior cruciate ligament (ACL) and meniscus in her knee during the game against the Houston Dash, ending her rookie season after ten appearances.

On July 13, 2025, after a year away, Pfeiffer returned from injury in a 3–0 friendly win over Palmeiras in the Teal Rising Cup. On October 6, after the Current clinched the NWSL Shield, she made her first professional start and played 58 minutes in a 1–0 win over Angel City FC. In the playoff quarterfinals, she replaced Debinha to play both extra time periods in the Current's 2–1 upset loss to eventual champions Gotham FC. She departed from the Current by mutual contract termination at the end of the year.

=== Bay FC ===
On January 7, 2026, Bay FC announced the signing of Pfeiffer on a three-year contract. She had an electric debut in their season-opening 2–1 win against expansion team Denver Summit, recording a goal and an assist in Bay's first match under head coach Emma Coates. Two weeks later, she posted the same statline in a 3–1 win over the North Carolina Courage, becoming the youngest NWSL player to have multiple games with multiple goal contributions.

== International career ==
Pfeiffer helped the United States under-15 team win the 2022 CONCACAF Girls' U-15 Championship, scoring six goals with four assists at the tournament. In 2023, she led the under-16 team to the title at the Montaigu Tournament, scoring the lone goal in the final. She helped the under-17 team win the 2024 CONCACAF Women's U-17 Championship, scoring six goals with three assists at the tournament. Because of her knee injury, she missed the 2024 FIFA U-17 Women's World Cup.

Pfeiffer was not released by her club for the 2026 FIFA U-20 Women's World Cup and was among several players calling for the tournament to take place during a FIFA window.

== Career statistics ==
=== Club ===
As of December 24, 2025

Appearances and goals by club, season and competition
Club	Season	League			Playoffs		Total	
Club	Season	Division	Apps	Goals	Apps	Goals	Apps	Goals
Kansas City Current	2024	NWSL	10	1	—		10	1
Kansas City Current	2025	NWSL	4	0	1	0	5	0
Career total			14	1	1	0	15	1

== Honors ==
Kansas City Current

- NWSL Shield: 2025
- NWSL x Liga MX Femenil Summer Cup: 2024

United States U-17

- CONCACAF Women's U-17 Championship: 2024
