= Ellie Bravo-Young =

American soccer player (born 2001)

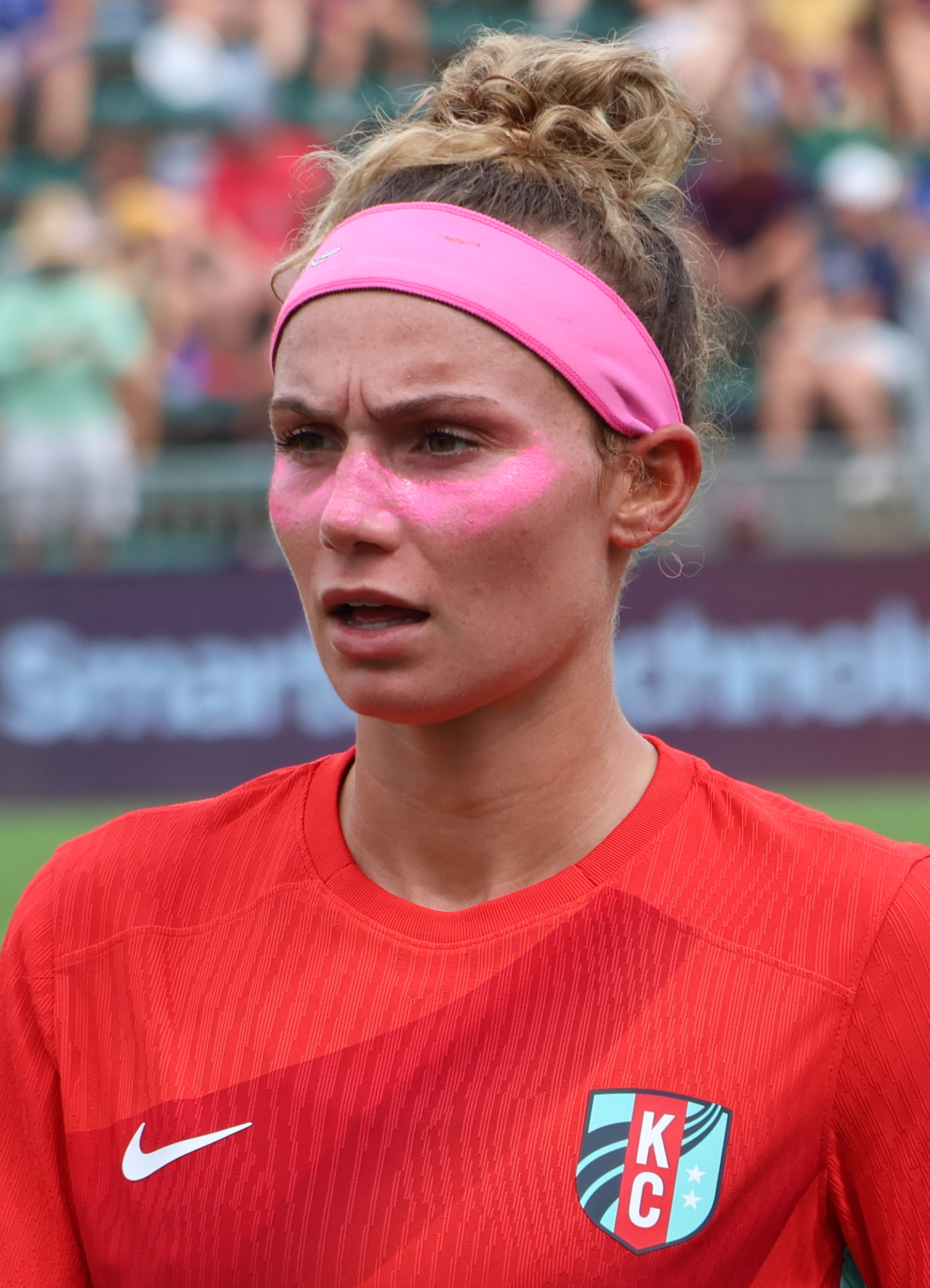
- Bravo-Young with the Kansas City Current in 2024

Personal information
- Birth name: Ellis Nicole Wheeler
- Date of birth: December 14, 2001 (age 24)
- Height: 5 ft 7 in (1.70 m)
- Position: Right back

Team information
- Current team: Kansas City Current
- Number: 5

College career
Years	Team	Apps	(Gls)
2020–2023	Penn State Nittany Lions	77	(3)

Senior career*
Years	Team	Apps	(Gls)
2024–	Kansas City Current	53	(2)

International career
2020	United States U-19	1	(0)
- * Club domestic league appearances and goals as of 16:46, November 14, 2026 (UTC)

Ellie Bravo-Young (née Wheeler; born December 14, 2001) is an American professional soccer player who plays as a right back for the Kansas City Current of the National Women's Soccer League (NWSL). She played college soccer for the Penn State Nittany Lions and was selected by the Current in the second round of the 2024 NWSL Draft.

== Early life ==
Bravo-Young grew up in Fairfax Station, Virginia. Growing up, she played as a midfielder or forward for FC Virginia, earning DA all-conference honors. She committed to Penn State as a freshman over offers from programs including North Carolina and Duke. She was ranked by TopDrawerSoccer as the No. 34 prospect of the 2020 class.

== College career ==
Bravo-Young played four seasons for the Penn State Nittany Lions, playing in 77 games (76 starts) and scoring 3 goals as a defender. Head coach Erica Dambach converted her to defense when she was a freshman in the spring of 2021, playing the wingback position, then moved her to center back as a sophomore. She then played at right back and helped the team win the Big Ten tournament in her junior season in 2022. In her senior year in 2023, she and the two seed Nittany Lions reached the NCAA tournament quarterfinals after three consecutive round of 16 finishes.

== Club career ==
Bravo-Young was drafted 18th overall by the Kansas City Current in the second round of the 2024 NWSL Draft, the team's highest pick of the night. She was signed to a one-year contract with the option to extend another year. She made her professional debut on March 16, 2024, starting and playing the entire match in a season-opening win over the Portland Thorns as the Current inaugurated their newly built CPKC Stadium. She scored her first professional goal in the game, putting away a loose ball in the penalty area for the Current's second in a 5–4 victory. On August 27, she signed a four-year extension, keeping her under contract through 2028. She made 23 regular-season appearances as a rookie, starting 14, and scored 1 goal as the Current placed fourth in the standings. She played the entirety of their two playoff games, a 1–0 quarterfinal win over the North Carolina Courage and a 3–2 semifinal defeat to the Orlando Pride.

On August 23, 2025, Bravo-Young had two goal involvements with a header goal from Izzy Rodriguez's cross and a long assist to Temwa Chawinga in a 2–0 road win over the Portland Thorns. She played in 21 games, starting 15, and scored 1 goal in the 2025 regular season, helping the Current win the NWSL Shield with the best record in the league. The team set multiple NWSL records including most points, most wins, and fewest goals allowed in a season. In the playoff quarterfinals, she scored a desperately needed goal to level the game 1–1 against Gotham FC in the 90+6th minute – the latest equalizer in NWSL playoff history – but lost 2–1 in extra time.

== International career ==
Bravo-Young was called into training camp with the United States under-17 team in July 2018. She played for the under-19 team in a friendly tournament in Spain in February–March 2020. She played for the under-23 team against NWSL teams in the 2023 preseason.

== Personal life ==
Bravo-Young is the daughter of Scott and Nicole Wheeler and has two brothers. She got engaged to Olympic wrestler Roman Bravo-Young on March 15, 2025. He proposed to her on the field at CPKC Stadium after the Current's season-opening victory over the Portland Thorns. The couple married in Tucson, Arizona, on December 27, 2025.

== Honors and awards ==
Penn State Nittany Lions

- Big Ten tournament: 2022

Kansas City Current

- NWSL Championship: 2026
- NWSL Shield: 2025
- NWSL x Liga MX Femenil Summer Cup: 2024
