= 2011 Draft =

2011 Draft may refer to:

== Various sporting drafts ==
- 2011 AFL draft
- 2011 CFL draft
- 2011 Major League Baseball draft
- 2011 MLS SuperDraft
  - 2011 MLS Supplemental Draft
- 2011 NBA draft
- 2011 NFL draft
- 2011 NHL entry draft
- 2011 Rookie Draft
- 2011 WNBA draft
- 2011 WPS Draft
- 2011 WWE draft
