= Lauren (Brazilian footballer) =

Brazilian footballer (born 2002)

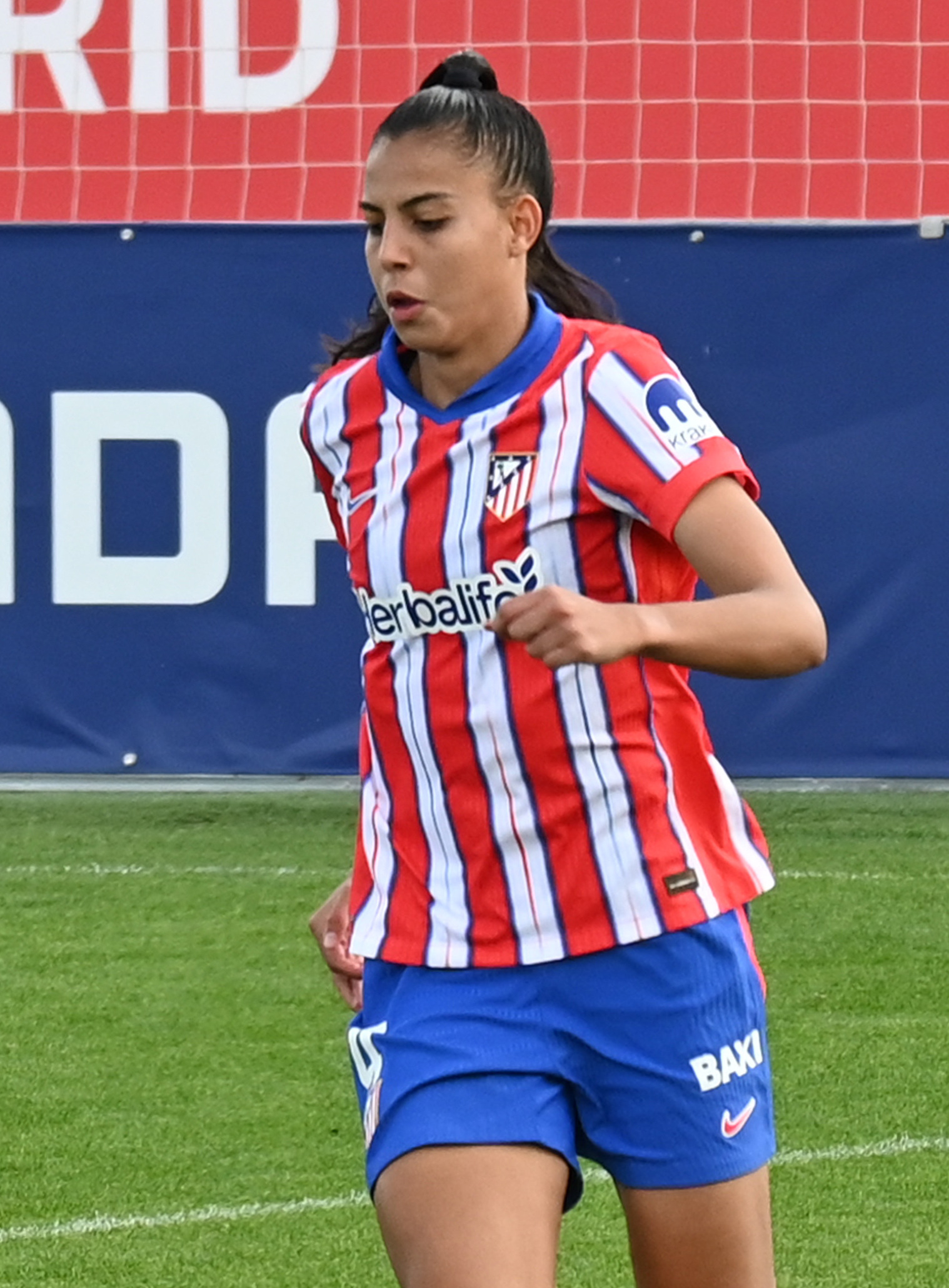
- Lauren with Atlético Madrid in 2024

Personal information
- Full name: Lauren Eduarda Leal Costa
- Date of birth: 13 September 2002 (age 24)
- Place of birth: Votorantim, São Paulo, Brazil
- Height: 1.78 m (5 ft 10 in)
- Position: Centre-back

Team information
- Current team: Atlético Madrid
- Number: 4

Youth career
- 2017–2020: São Paulo

Senior career*
Years	Team	Apps	(Gls)
2018	→ Centro Olímpico (loan)	0	(0)
2020–2021	São Paulo	27	(0)
2022–2023	Madrid CFF	40	(2)
2023–2024	Kansas City Current	5	(1)
2024–	Atlético Madrid	41	(4)

International career^{‡}
2018	Brazil U17	3	(0)
2019–2022	Brazil U20	18	(0)
2021–	Brazil	15	(0)
Medal record
Women's football
Representing Brazil
Olympic Games
Silver medal – second place	2024 Paris
- * Club domestic league appearances and goals as of 18:43, 28 December 2025 (UTC) ‡ National team caps and goals as of 02:32, 13 November 2023 (UTC)

Lauren Eduarda Leal Costa (born 13 September 2002), simply known as Lauren, is a Brazilian professional footballer who plays as a centre-back for Atlético Madrid in Liga F and the Brazil women's national team.

== Club career ==
In Brazil, Lauren played for AD Centro Olímpico and debuted as a professional for São Paulo.

She also played for Spanish club Madrid CFF in Liga F, making 40 total appearances and reaching the quarterfinals of the 2021–22 Copa de la Reina de Fútbol.

On 24 July 2023, NWSL club Kansas City Current signed Lauren to a contract through 2024 with an option for an additional year. The Current had previously traded $100,000 in NWSL allocation money and a 2024 international slot to fellow NWSL club North Carolina Courage in exchange for the right to sign Lauren.

On 21 August 2024, Kansas City Current announced that Lauren had been transferred to Atlético Madrid.

== International career ==
Lauren represented Brazil at the 2018 South American U-17 Women's Championship and the 2020 South American Under-20 Women's Football Championship. She made her senior debut on 20 September 2021.

On 27 June 2023, Brazil named Lauren to its final 2023 FIFA Women's World Cup squad. On 24 July, she made her World Cup debut in Brazil's opening group-stage match against Panama, which Brazil won 4–0.

On 1 February 2024, Lauren was called up to the Brazil squad for the 2024 CONCACAF W Gold Cup.

On 2 July 2024, Lauren was called up to the Brazil squad for the 2024 Summer Olympics. She started the gold medal match against the United States, a 1–0 defeat that gave Brazil the tournament's silver medal. Lauren described the Olympics as a "unique" experience, with heightened emotional significance due to her family's presence at the final.

Lauren scored her first international goal on 1 December 2024, contributing to a 2–1 victory over Australia.

== International goals ==
No.	Date	Venue	Opponent	Score	Result	Competition
1.	1 December 2024	Robina Stadium, Gold Coast, Australia	Australia	2–0	2–1	Friendly

== Honours ==
Brazil U20

- South American Under-20 Women's Football Championship: 2022

Brazil

- Summer Olympics silver medal: 2024
