= Ljupčo Kmetovski =

Macedonian footballer (born 1972)

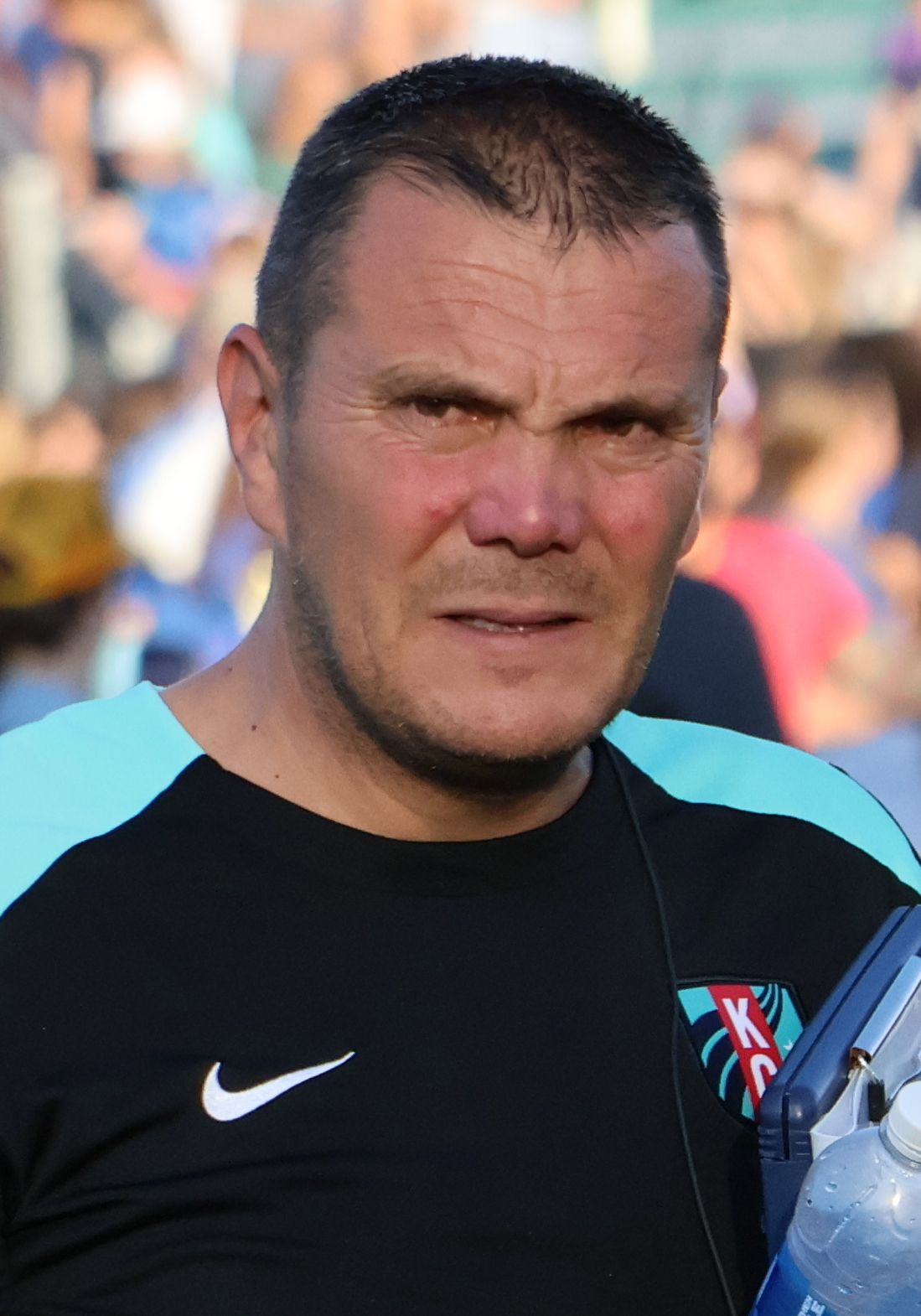
- Kmetovski with the Kansas City Current in 2025

Personal information
- Full name: Ljupčo Kmetovski
- Date of birth: 8 July 1972 (age 54)
- Place of birth: Skopje, SR Macedonia, SFR Yugoslavia
- Height: 1.83 m (6 ft 0 in)
- Position: Goalkeeper

Youth career
- FK Balkan Skopje

Senior career*
Years	Team	Apps	(Gls)
1994–1999	Balkan	150	(0)
1999–2001	Rabotnički	60	(0)
2001–2004	Cementarnica	130	(0)
2004–2006	Vardar	70	(0)
2006–2007	Milano	35	(0)
2007–2008	Rabotnički	3	(0)
2008–2009	Vardar	1	(0)
2008	Rabotnički (loan)	2	(0)
2009–2011	Teteks	18	(0)
2009	Rabotnički (loan)	0	(0)

International career
2005	Macedonia	1	(0)

Managerial career
- 2010–2011: Teteks
- 2011–2014: Metalurg Skopje (goalkeeping)
- 2019–2023: OL Reign (goalkeeping)
- 2024-: Kansas City Current (goalkeeping)
- * Club domestic league appearances and goals

Ljupčo "Raki" Kmetovski (Macedonian: Љупчо Кметовски; born 7 August 1972) is a Macedonian football coach and former player. He is the goalkeeping coach for Kansas City Current of the National Women's Soccer League.

== International career ==
He made his senior debut and played his only international match for Macedonia in a November 2005 friendly away against Liechtenstein.

== Coaching career ==
Kmetovski has previously coached for Teteks and Metalurg Skopje in North Macedonia and OL Reign of the NWSL. He is currently the goalkeeping coach for the Kansas City Current.

== Achievements ==
As player:

- FK Cementarnica 55 Skopje
  - Macedonian Cup: 1
    - Winner: 2002–03
- FK Rabotnički Skopje
  - First Macedonian Football League: 1
    - Winner: 2007–08
  - Macedonian Cup: 1
    - Winner: 2007–08
- FK Teteks
  - Macedonian Cup: 1
    - Winner: 2009–10
  - Second Macedonian Football League: 1
    - Winner: 2008–09

As coach:

- FK Teteks Tetovo
  - Macedonian Cup:1
    - Winner: 2009–10
- FK Metalurg Skopje
  - Macedonian Cup: 1
    - Winner: 2010–11
