= Katie Fraine =

American soccer goalkeeper (born 1987)

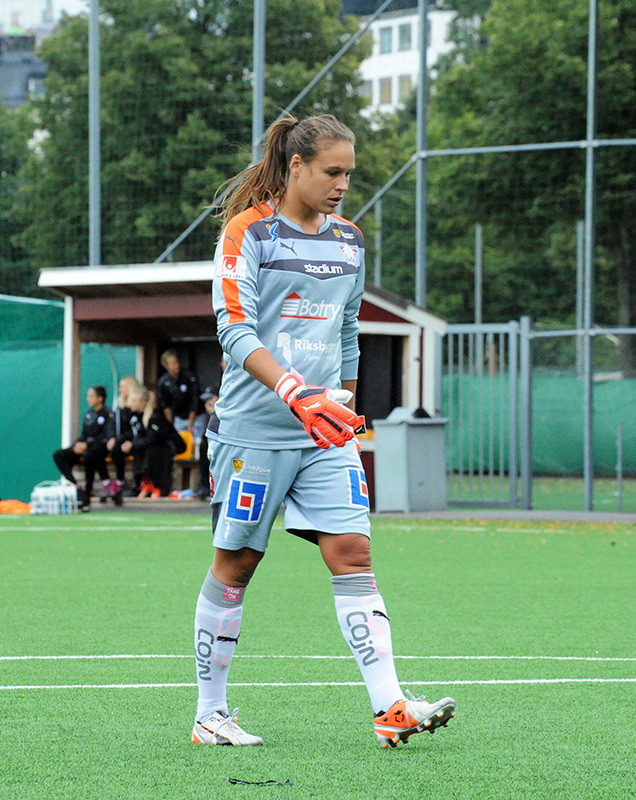
- With Linköpings in 2015

Personal information
- Full name: Katlynn Loretta Fraine
- Date of birth: December 3, 1987 (age 38)
- Place of birth: Titusville, Florida, United States
- Height: 1.82 m (6 ft 0 in)
- Position: Goalkeeper

College career
| Years | Team | Apps | (Gls) |
| 2006–2010 | Florida Gators | 24 | (0) |

Senior career*
| Years | Team | Apps | (Gls) |
| 2008 | Tampa Bay Hellenic | 8 | (0) |
| 2011 | Atlanta Beat | 0 | (0) |
| 2012–2013 | Mallbackens IF | 45 | (0) |
| 2014–2015 | Linköpings FC | 40 | (0) |
| 2016 | Vittsjö GIK | 20 | (0) |
| 2017 | Avaldsnes IL | 20 | (0) |
| 2018–2021 | Växjö DFF | 62 | (0) |
| 2022–2023 | Eskilstuna United | 20 | (0) |
| 2023 | Hibernian | 26 | (0) |
| 2024 | Kansas City Current | 0 | (0) |
- * Club domestic league appearances and goals as of 00:00, 8th July 2023 (UTC)

Katlynn Loretta Fraine (born December 3, 1987) is an American soccer goalkeeper who most recently played for the Kansas City Current of the National Women's Soccer League. Fraine graduated from the University of Florida and spent the 2011 season with Women's Professional Soccer (WPS) club Atlanta Beat. She moved to Sweden in 2012 and played successfully for Mallbackens IF and Linköpings FC before joining Vittsjö in December 2015.

== Playing career ==
=== Tampa Bay Hellenic, 2008 ===
She made eight appearances for newly-formed USL W-League club Tampa Bay Hellenic in the 2008 season.

=== Atlanta Beat, 2011 ===
Fraine was drafted by the Washington Freedom during the fourth round of the 2011 WPS Draft. She was one of two goalkeepers selected during the draft. After a change in team ownership to magicJack (WPS) and move to Florida, Fraine was later picked up by the Atlanta Beat but did not make an appearance for the club, although she was on the roster throughout the 2011 season.

=== Damallsvenskan: 2013–2016; 2018–2022 ===
After the WPS folded in early 2012, Fraine signed with Swedish club Mallbackens IF and helped the team get promoted to the Damallsvenskan for the 2013 season. During her debut season with the club in the second-division league Söderettan, Fraine made 23 appearances (all starts) and helped the club finish first in the league with a 12–1–7 record. After defeating Sirius in the promotions playoffs, Mallbackens was promoted to top-division league, Damallsvenskan. During the 2013 season, Fraine made 22 appearances for the club. They finished in 11th place with a 3–12–7 record.

Fraine signed with Damallsvenskan club Linköping FC for the 2014 season and made 19 appearances for the club for total of 1687 minutes. They finished in fourth place during the regular season with 11–4–5 record. She returned to Linköping for the 2015 season and helped the team finish in fourth place with a 14–6–2 record.

In December 2015, it was announced that Fraine had signed with Vittsjö GIK for the 2016 season. She moved to Norwegian Toppserien team Avaldsnes IL for 2017, before returning to the Damallsvenskan with Växjö DFF a year later.

=== Kansas City Current, 2024 ===
On September 13, 2024, the Kansas City Current signed Fraine to a contract for the remainder of the season. She did not make any appearances for the Current before her contract expired at the end of 2024.

== International career ==
Fraine was called into a United States women's national under-23 soccer team training camp in summer 2010. She remains eligible for the Republic of Ireland women's national football team due to her Irish American heritage.

== Honors ==
Kansas City Current

- NWSL x Liga MX Femenil Summer Cup: 2024
