= CPKC Stadium =

Soccer stadium in Kansas City, Missouri, US

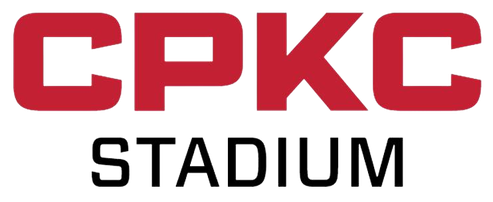

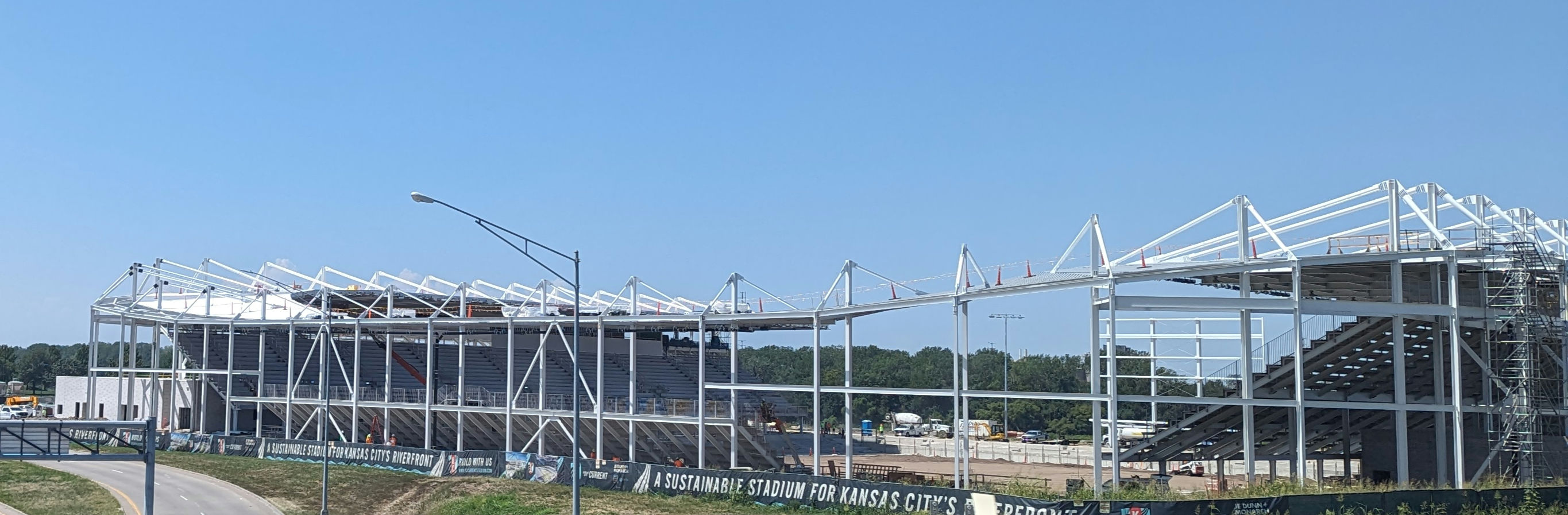
- CPKC Stadium under construction in August 2023

- Location in Missouri Location in the United States
- Location: Kansas City, Missouri, U.S.
- Coordinates: 39°07′13.2″N 94°33′58.5″W
- Capacity: 11,500
- Type: Soccer-specific stadium
- Public transit: KC Streetcar (2025)

Construction
- Groundbreaking: October 6, 2022
- Opened: March 16, 2024
- Cost: $117 million
- Architect: Generator Studio
- Project managers: Henderson Engineers; Andrea Mulvany; Katelyn DePenning
- Structural engineer: Thornton Tomasetti
- Services engineers: Taliaferro & Browne, Inc.
- General contractors: J. E. Dunn Construction Group; Monarch Build

Tenant
- Kansas City Current (NWSL) (2024–present)

Website
- cpkcstadium.com

CPKC Stadium is a soccer-specific stadium located in Kansas City, Missouri, that serves as the home ground for the Kansas City Current of the National Women's Soccer League. The stadium opened for the Current's first home match of the 2024 season on March 16, 2024. Canadian Pacific Kansas City, abbreviated to CPKC in the stadium name, has the current naming rights. It is the first privately financed stadium purpose-built exclusively for a professional women's soccer team. In 2024, the Current became the first NWSL site to sell out all of their home matches.

== History ==
=== Venue search ===
The Current were founded in December 2020 as Kansas City NWSL, a transitional NWSL expansion team owned by Angie Long, Chris Long, and Brittany Matthews. The team was created on an accelerated timeline in order to accept and relocate the roster of Utah Royals FC, whose closure was publicly announced on the same day as the Kansas City team. The new team attempted to secure Children's Mercy Park, a soccer-specific stadium in Kansas City, Kansas, that was owned and controlled by Major League Soccer team Sporting Kansas City, as a home venue. However, Sporting declined to share the stadium with KC NWSL.

For the 2021 Kansas City NWSL season, the team instead shared baseball stadium Legends Field with the Kansas City Monarchs. Due to delays in converting the Legends Field baseball diamond to a soccer pitch, Sporting Kansas City allowed the Current to play their first home match of the 2021 NWSL Challenge Cup on April 26 at Children's Mercy Park.

=== Proposal ===
In December 2020, Current co-owner Chris Long first raised plans for a practice facility and stadium to Generator Studio design director Tom Proebstle, whose firm evaluated more than 10 sites before settling on a 7.08-acre (2.87 ha) parcel owned by the Port of Kansas City east of the Richard L. Berkley Riverfront Park designated Parcel 8, which had previously been used as a dumping ground for the collapsed Kemper Arena roof. Long initially sought to build both the stadium and a dedicated training facility on the same site. However, team ownership separately announced, planned, and constructed an $18 million dedicated practice facility in Riverside, Missouri, that opened in June 2022. Initial stadium concepts operated on an estimated need of 6,000 seats but expanded to 11,500.

The Current's ownership formally proposed a privately financed $70 million stadium development with an 11,000-seat capacity on the Parcel 8 site in 2021, and on October 26, 2021, the Current's owners announced that they had signed a 50-year lease with Port KC for the property. As of the announcement, no NWSL team owned or controlled its primary home venue, instead relying on soccer-specific venues controlled by teams in Major League Soccer or the United Soccer League organization, or venues for other sports, causing scheduling issues. The stadium proposal included a safe standing section for supporters, reserved seating, suites, and tables, with all seating positioned within 100 feet of the pitch. The proposed stadium could also be converted for use as a music venue and included retractable seating for potential reuse as a gridiron football field. The stadium was also designed to support future expansion to up to 20,500 seats.

In May 2022, the Current increased the planned seated capacity of the stadium to 11,500 and raised the required budget to an estimated $117 million. The Current's ownership requested $6 million in state tax credits to help offset the increased budget.

=== Construction ===
Construction began in 2022, with an official groundbreaking ceremony on October 6, 2022. Construction of the stadium's stands began in May 2023. Contractors J. E. Dunn Construction Group and Monarch Build led general construction, and Generator Studios served as the architectural firm and designed the stadium's interior. Generator contracted structural engineering to Thornton Tomasetti. Taliaferro & Browne provided surveying and civil engineering services, including coordination with the United States Army Corps of Engineers on the project's potential impact on the Missouri River levee.

The press box at the stadium was dedicated in November 2023 to the late Grant Wahl, a Kansas City native who covered soccer for Sports Illustrated and other outlets.

=== Naming rights ===
On October 19, 2023, the Current announced that Canadian Pacific Kansas City, a Canadian railway holding company with U.S. headquarters in Kansas City, had acquired the naming rights to the stadium. As part of the ten-year agreement, the venue was named CPKC Stadium.

=== Opening ===
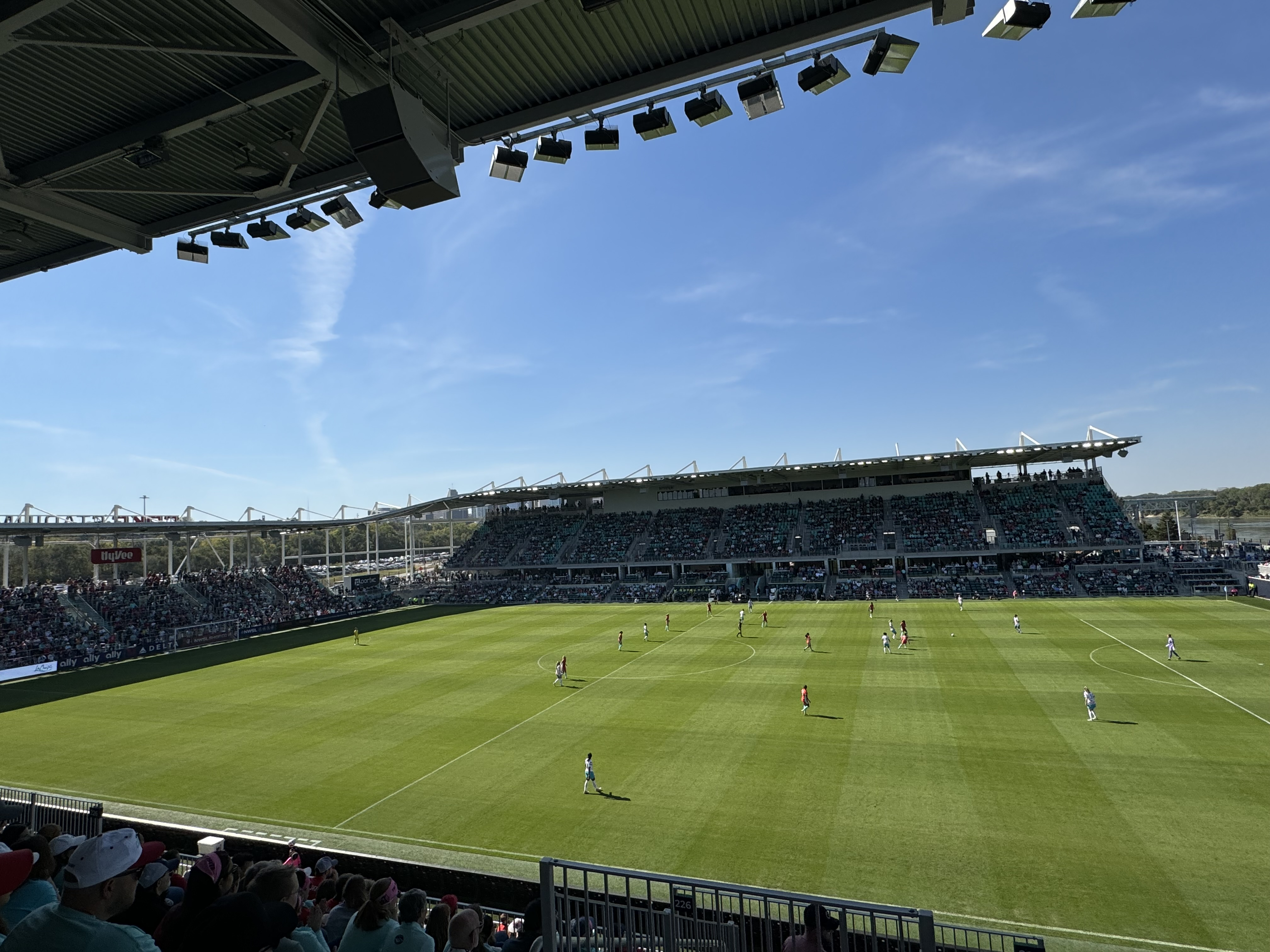
San Diego Wave FC at Kansas City Current, 2024

CPKC Stadium held its first match between the Kansas City Current and the Portland Thorns on March 16, 2024. Vanessa DiBernardo scored the first goal in the history of the stadium and Kansas City won the match 5–4 in front of a sell-out crowd.

By the conclusion of the 2024 season, the Current became the first NWSL team to sell out every home match.

In June 2026, the Current announced it was working with the Kansas City City Council for funding on an expansion of capacity of the stadium to 18,000 as well as a larger transformation of the Berkley Riverfront, more parking, trail connections, new shops, and add further mixed-use development.

=== Other events ===
The first major event CPKC Stadium hosted that did not involve the Kansas City Current was the 2024 Big 12 Conference women's soccer tournament in late October and November 2024, won by the Kansas Jayhawks. The 2024 NWSL Championship between the Orlando Pride and the Washington Spirit was held on November 23, 2024, with Orlando claiming their first NWSL Championship, 1-0, thanks to a goal by Barbara Banda.

In 2025, CPKC Stadium hosted several international soccer matches as well as other events. On April 5, 2025, Mexican women's national team played Jamaica in the first international friendly at the facility. On May 3, the first major non-soccer event was held when USA Rugby played Canada with U.S. star Ilona Maher playing in front of an announced 10,518 fans, setting a new record for a USA women’s rugby match. On July 4–5, the Premier Lacrosse League and Women's Lacrosse League hosted All-Star events at the venue. Both the PLL and WLL Skills competitions were held on July 4, along with the WLL All-Star game. The following day, the PLL All-Star game was held.

The United States women's national soccer team played their first match at the venue on October 29, 2025 against New Zealand, winning 6-0.

The facility hosted the 2025 NCAA Women's College Cup on December 6 and 9, 2025. In the semifinals, 3-seed Florida State defeated 2-seed TCU, 1-0, followed by 1-seed Stanford beating 2-seed Duke, 1-0. In the title game on December 9th, the Seminoles won their third national championship in five years, defeating Stanford 1-0.

Preceded by Children's Mercy Park	Home of the Kansas City Current; 2024–	Succeeded by current
