= Izzy Rodriguez =

American soccer player (born 1999)

- Rodriguez with the Kansas City Current in 2026

Personal information
- Full name: Isabel Denise Rodriguez
- Date of birth: April 13, 1999 (age 27)
- Place of birth: Canton, Michigan, U.S.
- Height: 5 ft 5 in (1.65 m)
- Position: Left back

Team information
- Current team: Kansas City Current
- Number: 18

Youth career
- Michigan Hawks

College career
Years	Team	Apps	(Gls)
2017–2021	Ohio State Buckeyes	88	(8)

Senior career*
Years	Team	Apps	(Gls)
2022–	Kansas City Current	115	(6)

International career^{‡}
2016	United States U17	2	
2017–2018	United States U20	16	(0)
2025–	United States	2	(1)
- * Club domestic league appearances and goals as of 16:50, November 14, 2026 (UTC) ‡ National team caps and goals as of January 24, 2026

Isabel Denise Rodriguez (born April 13, 1999) is an American professional soccer player who plays as a left back for the Kansas City Current of the National Women's Soccer League (NWSL) and the United States national team. She played college soccer for the Ohio State Buckeyes and was named Big Ten Defender of the Year in 2020. She was drafted by the Current in the fourth round of the 2022 NWSL Draft. She represented the United States at the youth level, appearing at the 2016 FIFA U-17 World Cup and the 2018 FIFA U-20 World Cup, before making her senior debut in 2025.

== Early life ==
Rodriguez grew up in Canton, Michigan, the daughter of Robert and Audrey Rodriguez, and has an older brother. She joined the Michigan Hawks at the U12 age group.

== College career ==
Rodriguez played soccer for the Ohio State Buckeyes where she won Big Ten Defender of the Year in 2020. She was named Big Ten Medal of Honor winner in 2022, becoming the second Ohio State women's soccer player to earn the award.

== Club career ==
=== Kansas City Current ===
Rodriguez was drafted 43rd overall by the Kansas City Current in the fourth round of the 2022 NWSL Draft and signed to a two-year contract. She made her first professional start on April 15, 2022, and assisted a goal for Kristen Hamilton against Houston Dash in a 2–1 win. In a home game against Gotham on June 11, she assisted Hamilton again to make it a 1–0 victory in the 84th minute.

Rodriguez scored her first professional goal for the Current on May 7, 2023, in a 3–2 loss against Angel City. She became a regular starter by the end of the 2023 season. In the home finale, she opened scoring in a 6–3 win over the Chicago Red Stars in front of her club's record-breaking crowd of over 15,000. After the season, she re-signed for the Current through the 2025 season.

In the first away game of the season on March 23, 2024, Rodriguez equalized in an eventual 2–1 victory against the San Diego Wave. She appeared in 21 games (18 starts) in the 2024 regular season. In the 2024 playoffs, she played 15 minutes in the 3–2 semifinal defeat to the Orlando Pride.

On July 1, 2025, the Current announced that Rodriguez had signed a contract extension through the 2028 season.

On November 10, 2025, it was announced that Rodriguez was one of five finalists for the NWSL Defender of the Year award, along with defensive teammate Kayla Sharples. Players from the Current made up one-third of all NWSL award nominees. Rodriguez was named to the 2025 NWSL Best XI First Team at the NWSL Awards.

== International career ==
Rodriguez represented the youth national team at the 2016 FIFA U-17 World Cup and the 2018 FIFA U-20 World Cup.

Emma Hayes gave Rodriguez her first senior national team call-up in June 2025. She made her senior international debut against the Republic of Ireland on June 29, playing 90 minutes and scoring the second goal of the 4–0 friendly win.

== Honors ==
Kansas City Current

- NWSL Championship: 2026
- NWSL Shield: 2025
- NWSL x Liga MX Femenil Summer Cup: 2024

United States U-17

- CONCACAF Women's U-17 Championship: 2016

Individual

- Third-team All-American: 2020
- Big Ten Defender of the Year: 2020
- All-Big Ten: 2018, 2020 (first team); 2017, 2019 (third team)

== Career statistics ==
=== Club ===
As of match played March 23, 2024

Appearances and goals by club, season and competition
Club	Season	League			Cup (Note: Includes the NWSL Challenge Cup)		Playoffs (Note: Includes NWSL Playoffs)		Total	
Club	Season	Division	Apps	Goals	Apps	Goals	Apps	Goals	Apps	Goals
Kansas City Current	2022	NWSL	16	0	7	0	3	0	26	0
Kansas City Current	2023	NWSL	22	3	7	0	—		29	3
Kansas City Current	2024	NWSL	1	1	—		—		1	1
Career total			39	4	14	0	3	0	56	4

=== International ===
As of match played January 24, 2026

National Team	Year	Apps	Goals
United States	2025	1	1
United States	2026	1	0
Total		2	1

List of international goals scored by Izzy Rodriguez
No.	Date	Venue	Opponent	Score	Result	Competition	Ref.
1	June 29, 2025	Columbus, Ohio, United States	Republic of Ireland	2–0	4–0	Friendly	
