= List of Bay FC players =

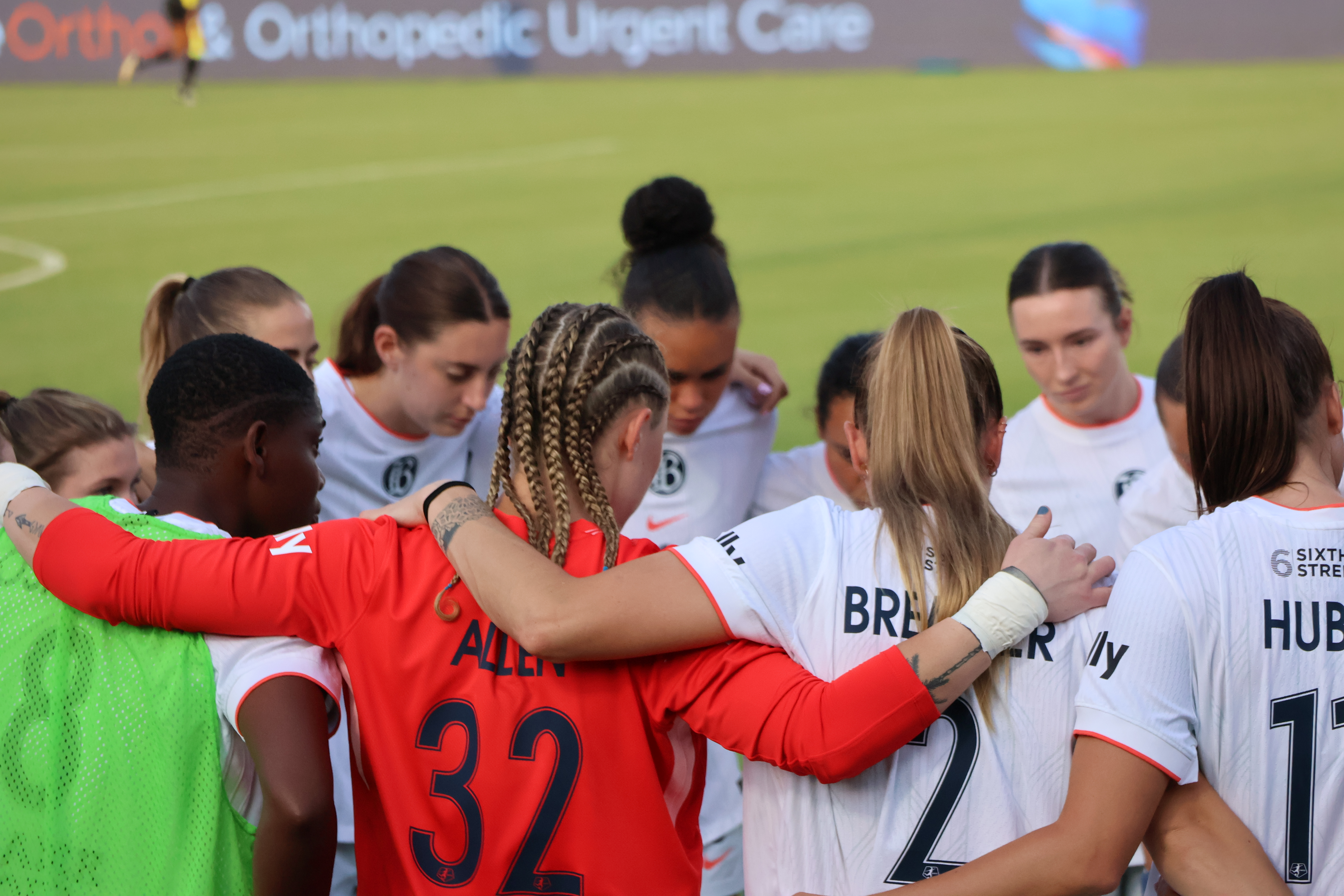
Bay FC players in a team huddle before a match against the North Carolina Courage on April 19, 2025

Bay FC is an American professional women's soccer club which began play in the National Women's Soccer League (NWSL) in 2024 as an expansion team. All rostered players during the NWSL season, including the playoffs and NWSL x Liga MX Femenil Summer Cup, even if they did not make an appearance, are listed below.

== Key ==
- The list is ordered alphabetically.
- Appearances as a substitute are included.
- Statistics are correct as of November 1, 2026, the end of the 2026 NWSL season, and are updated once a year after the conclusion of the NWSL season.
- Players whose names are highlighted in **bold** were active players on the Bay FC roster as of the list's most recent update.

Positions key
GK	Goalkeeper
DF	Defender
MF	Midfielder
FW	Forward

Nationality
Unless otherwise noted, the nationality of a player is determined by the country they most recently represented in international play, or if said player has not played international football then by their country of birth.
Position
Playing positions are listed according to the player's roster designation as of the list's most recent update.
Years
Years are defined as the first and last calendar years in which the player was rostered for the club in any of the competitions listed below.
Appearances and goals
This list counts appearances and goals in the National Women's Soccer League, NWSL Playoffs, and NWSL x Liga MX Femenil Summer Cup.

== Players ==
Yrs	No.	Pos	Nat	Player	Total		NWSL		Playoffs		Cup		Other (Note: Includes the NWSL x Liga MX Femenil Summer Cup)	
Yrs	No.	Pos	Nat	Player	Apps	Goals	Apps	Goals	Apps	Goals	Apps	Goals	Apps	Goals
2024–	32	GK	(United States) USA	Emmie Allen	5	0	4	0	0	0	0	0	1	0
2024–	18	MF	(United States) USA	Joelle Anderson	66	5	63	5	0	0	0	0	3	0
2024–	19	MF	(United States) USA	Dorian Bailey	73	4	69	3	1	0	0	0	3	1
2026–	27	FW	(England) ENG	Keira Barry	22	2	22	2	0	0	0	0	0	0
2024	5	DF	(Scotland) SCO	Jen Beattie	10	0	8	0	0	0	0	0	2	0
2024–	41	MF	(United States) USA	Hannah Bebar	47	1	47	1	0	0	0	0	0	0
2024–2026	12	FW	(United States) USA	Tess Boade	48	3	46	3	1	0	0	0	1	0
2024–2025	16	DF	(United States) USA	Jordan Brewster	5	0	2	0	0	0	0	0	3	0
2024–	11	FW	(Mexico) MEX	Scarlett Camberos	10	1	10	1	0	0	0	0	0	0
2024–	10	MF	(Venezuela) VEN	Deyna Castellanos	24	2	20	2	1	0	0	0	3	0
2025–	16	DF	(Canada) CAN	Sydney Collins	37	0	37	0	0	0	0	0	0	0
2026–	21	DF	(Argentina) ARG	Aldana Cometti	22	0	22	0	0	0	0	0	0	0
2024–	15, 23	MF	(United States) USA	Caroline Conti	55	5	53	5	0	0	0	0	2	0
2025–	22	DF	(Canada) CAN	Brooklyn Courtnall	18	0	18	0	0	0	0	0	0	0
2024–	13	DF	(United States) USA	Abby Dahlkemper	25	2	24	2	1	0	0	0	0	0
2026–	25	DF	(England) ENG	Anouk Denton	8	0	8	0	0	0	0	0	0	0
2024	6	MF	(United States) USA	Maya Doms	3	0	1	0	0	0	0	0	2	0
2024–	3	DF	(United States) USA	Caprice Dydasco	55	0	51	0	1	0	0	0	3	0
2025	0	GK	(United States) USA	Leah Freeman	0	0	0	0	0	0	0	0	0	0
2026–	47	MF	(United States) USA	Kennedy Fuller	15	2	15	2	0	0	0	0	0	0
2025–	6	FW	(United States) USA	Onyeka Gamero	5	0	5	0	0	0	0	0	0	0
2026–	2	DF	(United States) USA	Heather Gilchrist	10	1	10	1	0	0	0	0	0	0
2026–	10	FW	(Italy) ITA	Cristiana Girelli	25	1	25	1	0	0	0	0	0	0
2024–2025	21	FW	(United States) USA	Rachel Hill	43	3	41	3	1	0	0	0	1	0
2024–2025	55	FW	(United States) USA	Penelope Hocking	27	6	26	6	1	0	0	0	0	0
2026–	30	FW	(Argentina) ARG	Agostina Holzheier	9	0	9	0	0	0	0	0	0	0
2025–	11	DF	(United States) USA	Kelli Hubly	21	1	21	1	0	0	0	0	0	0
2025–	7	MF	(United States) USA	Taylor Huff	48	6	48	6	0	0	0	0	0	0
2026–	8	MF	(United States) USA	Claire Hutton	28	2	28	2	0	0	0	0	0	0
2024	2	DF	(United States) USA	Savy King	20	0	18	0	0	0	0	0	2	0
2024–2026	9	FW	(Zambia) ZAM	Racheal Kundananji	64	12	63	12	1	0	0	0	0	0
2025–	5	FW	(United States) USA	Karlie Lema	54	10	54	10	0	0	0	0	0	0
2024	22	MF	(United States) USA	Alex Loera (Note: Loera was Bay FC's inaugural signing, announced on November 15, 2023.)	4	1	4	1	0	0	0	0	0	0
2024–2025	1	GK	(United States) USA	Melissa Lowder	0	0	0	0	0	0	0	0	0	0
2024–	20	DF	(United States) USA	Alyssa Malonson	52	1	48	1	1	0	0	0	3	0
2024–2025	7, 71	FW	(Ghana) GHA	Princess Marfo	11	0	9	0	0	0	0	0	2	0
2024–	4	DF	(United States) USA	Emily Menges	34	0	32	0	1	0	0	0	1	0
2026–	1	GK	(United States) USA	Camryn Miller	0	0	0	0	0	0	0	0	0	0
2024–	24	DF	(United States) USA	Maddie Moreau	58	2	54	0	1	0	0	0	3	2
2026–	31	DF	(United States) USA	Jenna Nighswonger	12	0	12	0	0	0	0	0	0	0
2024–2025	8	FW	(Nigeria) NGR	Asisat Oshoala (Note: Oshoala scored Bay FC's first-ever goal, which came against Angel City FC on March 17, 2024.)	38	8	37	7	1	1	0	0	0	0
2024–2025	17	FW	(United States) USA	Catherine Paulson	6	0	6	0	0	0	0	0	0	0
2026–	17	FW	(United States) USA	Alex Pfeiffer	20	3	20	3	0	0	0	0	0	0
2024–	23	MF	(United States) USA	Kiki Pickett	43	3	39	3	1	0	0	0	3	0
2024	44	GK	(Canada) CAN	Lysianne Proulx	6	0	6	0	0	0	0	0	0	0
2024	0	GK	(United States) USA	Katelyn Rowland	24	0	23	0	1	0	0	0	0	0
2024	27	DF	(United States) USA	Kayla Sharples	15	2	15	2	0	0	0	0	0	0
2024–	14	MF	(United States) USA	Jamie Shepherd	15	0	13	0	0	0	0	0	2	0
2024–	29	GK	(United States) USA	Jordan Silkowitz	53	0	53	0	0	0	0	0	0	0

== By nationality ==
In total, 49 players representing 11 countries have played for Bay FC.

Note: Countries indicate national team as defined under FIFA eligibility rules. Players may hold more than one non-FIFA nationality.

Country	Total players
Argentina	2
Canada	3
England	2
Ghana	1
Italy	1
Mexico	1
Nigeria	1
Scotland	1
United States	35
Venezuela	1
Zambia	1

== See also ==
- 2024 NWSL Expansion Draft
- List of top-division football clubs in CONCACAF countries
- List of professional sports teams in the United States and Canada
