= 2025 Bay FC season =

Bay FC's 2025 National Women's Soccer League season

Bay FC
2025 season
- Majority Owner: Sixth Street Partners
- Sporting Director: Matt Potter
- Head Coach: Albertin Montoya
- Stadium: PayPal Park
- NWSL: 13th
- Playoffs: DNQ
- Top goalscorer: Penelope Hocking (6)
- Highest home attendance: 40,091; Aug 23 vs. WAS
- Lowest home attendance: 10,798; Sep 27 vs. UTA
- Average home league attendance: 14,823
- Biggest win: 2-0 (May 17 vs LA, Mar 22 vs LOU)
- Biggest defeat: 1-4 (May 11 vs KC, Oct 17 vs. NC)
Home colors	Away colors
- All statistics correct as of March 23, 2026.

The 2025 season was Bay FC's second season as a professional women's soccer team. The club played in the National Women's Soccer League (NWSL), the top tier of soccer in the United States, with their home games at PayPal Park in San Jose, California.

Bay FC finished the season in 13th place out of 14 teams with a record of 4–14–8, and failed to qualify for the 2025 NWSL playoffs.

== Team ==
=== Squad ===
As of March 13, 2025.

No.	Pos.	Nation	Player
1	GK	USA	Melissa Lowder
3	DF	USA	Caprice Dydasco
4	DF	USA	Emily Menges
5	FW	USA	Karlie Lema
7	MF	USA	Taylor Huff
8	FW	NGR	Asisat Oshoala
9	FW	ZAM	Racheal Kundananji
11	DF	USA	Kelli Hubly
12	FW	USA	Tess Boade
13	DF	USA	Abby Dahlkemper
14	MF	USA	Jamie Shepherd
15	MF	USA	Caroline Conti
16	DF	USA	Jordan Brewster
17	FW	USA	Catherine Paulson
18	MF	USA	Joelle Anderson
19	MF	USA	Dorian Bailey
20	DF	USA	Alyssa Malonson
21	FW	USA	Rachel Hill
23	DF	USA	Kiki Pickett
24	DF	USA	Maddie Moreau
29	GK	USA	Jordan Silkowitz
32	GK	USA	Emmie Allen
41	MF	USA	Hannah Bebar
55	FW	USA	Penelope Hocking
71	FW	GHA	Princess Marfo

== Competitions ==
=== Preseason ===
February 16, 2025 Coachella Valley Invitational	Seattle Reign FC	1–0	Bay FC	Indio, California
1:00 p.m. PST	Biyendolo 9'	Report		Stadium: Empire Polo Club

February 22, 2025 Coachella Valley Invitational	San Diego Wave FC	1–0	Bay FC	Indio, California
11:00 a.m. PST	Sánchez 90'	Report		Stadium: Empire Polo Club

=== Friendlies ===
July 19, 2025 Summer Series	Bay FC	1–1	Angel City FC	San Jose, California
1:30 p.m. PST	Bench (yellow card) 38'; Pickett (yellow card) 43'; Hocking 57' (Moreau); Hocking (yellow card) 67'	Report	Endo 27'; Mattice (yellow card) 72'	Stadium: PayPal Park

July 27, 2025 Summer Series	Bay FC	2–2	Urawa Red Diamonds	San Jose, California
4:00 p.m. PST	Hocking 6' (Lema); Hocking (yellow card) 59'; Conti 90+2' (pen.)	Report	Ririka 21'; Ena 64'	Stadium: PayPal Park

==== Regular season standings ====
Pos	Team	Pld	W	D	L	GF	GA	GD	Pts
10	Houston Dash	26	8	6	12	27	39	−12	30
11	Angel City FC	26	7	6	13	31	41	−10	27
12	Utah Royals	26	6	7	13	28	42	−14	25
13	Bay FC	26	4	8	14	26	41	−15	20
14	Chicago Stars FC	26	3	11	12	32	54	−22	20

Source: NWSL
Rules for classification: 1) points; 2) total goal difference; 3) total wins; 4) total goals scored; 5) head-to-head points; 6) head-to-head goals scored; 7) fewest disciplinary points; 8) coin toss (if 2 clubs tied) or drawing of lots (if ≥3 clubs tied).

==== Results summary ====
Overall								Home						Away					
Pld	W	D	L	GF	GA	GD	Pts	W	D	L	GF	GA	GD	W	D	L	GF	GA	GD
26	4	8	14	26	41	−15	20	3	3	7	14	20	−6	1	5	7	12	21	−9

Last updated: November 2, 2025.
Source: NWSLsoccer.com

==== Results by matchday ====
Matchday	1	2	3	4	5	6	7	8	9	10	11	12	13	14	15	16	17	18	19	20	21	22	23	24	25	26
Stadium	A	H	A	H	A	H	A	A	H	A	H	H	A	H	A	H	H	A	H	A	H	H	A	A	H	A
Result	D	W	L	L	W	D	L	L	W	D	W	L	L	D	D	L	L	L	L	D	D	L	L	D	L	L
Position (Note: Bay's position at the end of the day on which their match was played.)	8	3	7	8	8	8	9	12	10	11	8	9	10	10	10	11	12	12	12	12	12	13	13	13	13	13

Updated to match(es) played on November 3, 2025. Source: NWSL
A = Away; H = Home; W = Win; D = Draw; L = Loss; = NWSL Shield; = NWSL Playoffs

=== Regular season ===
March 15, 2025 1	Utah Royals	1–1	Bay FC	Sandy, Utah
4:30 p.m. PDT (UTC-7)	St-Georges 12', (yellow card) 47'; Tejada (yellow card) 73'; Rábano (yellow card) 82'	Report	Kundananji (yellow card) 36'; Pickett 44', (yellow card) 45+5'; Hill (yellow card) 90+3'	Stadium: America First Field; Attendance: 10,624; Referee: Jaclyn Metz

March 22, 2025 2	Bay FC	2–0	Racing Louisville	San Jose, California
7:00 p.m. PDT (UTC-7)	Pickett (yellow card) 2'; Anderson 12'; Bailey (yellow card) 45+1'; Lema 45+2'; Huff (yellow card) 45+6'	Report	Fischer (yellow card) 90+8'	Stadium: PayPal Park; Attendance: 14,742; Referee: Danielle Chesky

March 28, 2025 3	Washington Spirit	2–0	Bay FC	Washington, D.C.
5:00 p.m. PDT (UTC-7)	Hatch 23', 26', (yellow card) 53'; Santos (yellow card) 51'	Report		Stadium: Audi Field; Attendance: 12,140; Referee: Natalie Simon

April 13, 2025 4	Bay FC	1–2	Chicago Stars	San Jose, California
4:00 p.m. PDT (UTC-7)	Conti 57' (pen.); Kundananji (yellow card) 90'	Report	Ludmila 4', 40'; Biegalski (yellow card) 47'; Grosso (yellow card) 83'	Stadium: PayPal Park; Attendance: 12,320; Referee: Brad Jensen

April 19, 2025 5	North Carolina Courage	0–1	Bay FC	Cary, North Carolina
4:00 p.m. PDT (UTC-7)	Rauch (yellow card) 52'; Matsukubo (yellow card) 90'; Williams (yellow card) 94'	Report	Pickett 32'; Dydasco (yellow card) 86'	Stadium: WakeMed Soccer Park; Attendance: 7049; Referee: Iryna Petrunok

April 26, 2025 6	Bay FC	1–1	Seattle Reign	San Jose, California
7:00 p.m. PDT (UTC-7)	Kundananji 31'; Dydasco (yellow card) 43'	Report	Dahlien (yellow card) 18'; Huitema 49'	Stadium: PayPal Park; Attendance: 11,564; Referee: Ekaterina Koroleva

May 4, 2025 7	San Diego Wave	2–1	Bay FC	San Diego, California
5:00 p.m. PDT (UTC-7)	Wesley 6'; Armstrong 90+5'	Report	Lema 18'; Anderson (yellow card) 43'; Kundananji (yellow card) 52'; Dydasco (yellow card) 67'	Stadium: Snapdragon Stadium; Attendance: 11,206; Referee: Elvis Osmanovic

May 11, 2025 8	Kansas City Current	4–1	Bay FC	Kansas City, Missouri
10:00 a.m. PDT (UTC-7)	Bia Zaneratto 3'; Debinha 33', 38'; Chawinga 62'; Feist (yellow card) 78'	Report	Hocking 53'	Stadium: CPKC Stadium; Attendance: 11,500; Referee: Jaclyn Metz

May 17, 2025 9	Bay FC	2–0	Angel City	San Jose, California
7:00 p.m. PDT (UTC-7)	Hocking 23'; Conti 28' (pen.); Kundananji (yellow card) 33'; Menges (yellow card) 45+4'; Bailey (yellow card) 53'; Silkowitz (yellow card) 72'	Report	Reid (yellow card) 13'	Stadium: PayPal Park; Attendance: 14,241; Referee: Brandon Stevis

May 24, 2025 10	Houston Dash	2–2	Bay FC	Houston, Texas
2:00 p.m. PDT (UTC-7)	Patterson 33'; Nielsen (yellow card) 85'; Bright 88'	Report	Dahlkemper (yellow card) 45+2'; Hocking 53'; Hill 56'	Stadium: Shell Energy Stadium; Attendance: 5,595; Referee: Alexandra Billeter

June 7, 2025 11	Bay FC	1–0	Portland Thorns	San Jose, California
4:30 p.m. PDT (UTC-7)	Oshoala (yellow card) 33'; Malonson 39'; Picket (yellow card) 80'	Report		Stadium: PayPal Park; Attendance: 14,094; Referee: Matthew Corrigan

June 13, 2025 12	Bay FC	0–1	Orlando Pride	San Jose, California
7:00 p.m. PDT (UTC-7)	Lema (yellow card) 31'	Report	Banda 58'	Stadium: PayPal Park; Attendance: 12,127; Referee: Muhammad Hassan

June 21, 2025 13	NJ/NY Gotham FC	1–2	Bay FC	Harrison, New Jersey
4:30 p.m. PDT (UTC-7)	González 30'; Geyse 55'	Report	Hocking 11'	Stadium: Sports Illustrated Stadium; Attendance: 9,009; Referee: Shawn Tehini

August 2, 2025 14	Bay FC	2–2	Houston Dash	San Jose, California
				Stadium: PayPal Park

August 10, 2025 15	Chicago Stars	1–1	Bay FC	Bridgeview, Illinois
	Groom 42'	Report	Huff 29'	Stadium: SeatGeek Stadium; Attendance: 3,624; Referee: John Griggs

August 16, 2025 16	Bay FC	1–2	San Diego Wave	San Jose, California
				Stadium: PayPal Park

August 23, 2025 17	Bay FC	2–3	Washington Spirit	San Francisco, California
				Stadium: Oracle Park

September 1, 2025 18	Angel City FC	2–1	Bay FC	Los Angeles, California
6:00 p.m. PDT (UTC-7)	Tiernan 12'; Hodge (yellow card) 34'; Niehues 77'	Report	Hill 37'; Malonson (yellow card) 47'; Dydasco (yellow card) 50'	Stadium: BMO Stadium; Attendance: 14,971; Referee: Matthew Thompson

September 6, 2025 19	Bay FC	0–2	Kansas City Current	San Jose, California
9:00 p.m. CDT	Hill (yellow card) 77'	Report	Rodríguez (yellow card) 40'; Cooper 45'; Chawinga 90+2'	Stadium: PayPal Park; Attendance: 11,520; Referee: Elvis Osmanovic

September 13, 2025 20	Orlando Pride	1–1	Bay FC	Orlando, Florida
5:00 pm	Watt 70'	Report	Kundananji 45+4'; Hubly (yellow card) 47'; Collins (yellow card) 53'	Stadium: Inter&Co Stadium; Referee: Natalie Simon

September 21, 2025 21	Bay FC	1–1	Gotham FC	San Jose, California
8:30 pm ET	Kundananji 68'	Report	Lavelle 36'; Schupansky (yellow card) 90+3'	Stadium: PayPal Park; Attendance: 11,193; Referee: Brad Jensen

September 27, 2025 22	Bay FC	0–2	Utah Royals	San Jose, California
	Pickett 25'; Hill (yellow card) 44'; Kundananji (yellow card) 78'	Report	Thomsen 9'; Solórzano (yellow card) 13', (goal) 18'; Tejada (yellow card) 39'; Justus (yellow card) 82'	Stadium: PayPal Park; Attendance: 10,798; Referee: Rachel Swett

October 4, 2025 23	Portland Thorns FC	1–2	Bay FC	Portland, Oregon
7:00 p.m. PST	Moultrie 51' (Coffey), 69'	Report	Huff 36' (Lema); Hocking (yellow card) 68'	Stadium: Providence Park; Attendance: 21,104; Referee: Tom Snyder

October 10, 2025 24	Seattle Reign FC	1–1	Bay FC	Seattle, Washington
7:30 p.m. PST	McClernon (yellow card) 58'; Fishlock 84'	Report	Huff 31' (Kundananji); Conti (yellow card) 90+8'	Stadium: Lumen Field; Attendance: 6,715; Referee: Matt Thompson

October 17, 2025 25	Bay FC	1–4	North Carolina Courage	San José, California
7:00 p.m. PST	Shepherd (yellow card) 24'; Malonson (yellow card) 34'; Hocking 45+3' (Malonson)	Report	Matsukubo 3' (Sanchez), 8' (Speck), 80'; Koyama 74' (Lussi)	Stadium: PayPal Park; Attendance: 13,519; Referee: Mark Verso

November 2, 2025 26	Racing Louisville FC	1–0	Bay FC	Louisville, Kentucky
5:00 p.m. EDT	Wright (yellow card) 6'; Hase 48' (O'Kane); Flint (yellow card) 57'; Ary Borges (yellow card) 66'; Bloomer (yellow card) 90+1'	Report	Conti (yellow card) 68'; Lema (yellow card) 90+1'	Stadium: Lynn Family Stadium; Attendance: 6,574; Referee: Shawn Tehini

== Statistics ==
As of November 6, 2025

=== Appearances and goals ===
Starting appearances are listed first, followed by substitute appearances after the + symbol where applicable.

No.	Pos	Nat	Player	Total		NWSL	
No.	Pos	Nat	Player	Apps	Goals	Apps	Goals
Goalkeepers
0	GK	(United States) USA	Leah Freeman	0	0	0	0
1	GK	(United States) USA	Melissa Lowder	0	0	0	0
29	GK	(United States) USA	Jordan Silkowitz	24	0	24	0
32	GK	(United States) USA	Emmie Allen	2	0	2	0
Defenders
3	DF	(United States) USA	Caprice Dydasco	26	0	26	0
4	DF	(United States) USA	Emily Menges	5	0	3+2	0
11	DF	(United States) USA	Kelli Hubly	9	1	7+2	1
13	DF	(United States) USA	Abby Dahlkemper	13	0	13	0
16	DF	(Canada) CAN	Sydney Collins	9	0	8+1	0
20	DF	(United States) USA	Alyssa Malonson	26	1	21+5	1
22	DF	(Canada) CAN	Brooklyn Courtnall	7	0	6+1	0
24	DF	(United States) USA	Maddie Moreau	15	0	5+10	0
Midfielders
7	MF	(United States) USA	Taylor Huff	26	4	26	4
12	MF	(United States) USA	Tess Boade	19	0	10+9	0
14	MF	(United States) USA	Jamie Shepherd	10	0	3+7	0
15	MF	(United States) USA	Caroline Conti	21	3	14+7	3
17	MF	(United States) USA	Catherine Paulson	6	0	1+5	0
18	MF	(United States) USA	Joelle Anderson	20	1	15+5	1
19	MF	(United States) USA	Dorian Bailey	23	0	12+11	0
23	MF	(United States) USA	Kiki Pickett	19	2	13+6	2
41	MF	(United States) USA	Hannah Bebar	17	0	12+5	0
Forwards
5	FW	(United States) USA	Karlie Lema	24	2	15+9	2
6	FW	(United States) USA	Onyeka Gamero	0	0	0	0
9	FW	(Zambia) ZAM	Racheal Kundananji	24	4	20+4	4
21	FW	(United States) USA	Rachel Hill	23	2	14+9	2
55	FW	(United States) USA	Penelope Hocking	18	6	10+8	6
Players away from the club on loan:
16	DF	(United States) USA	Jordan Brewster	1	0	1	0
Players who left the club during the season:
8	FW	(Nigeria) NGR	Asisat Oshoala	12	0	5+7	0
71	FW	(Ghana) GHA	Princess Marfo	0	0	0	0

== Transactions ==
=== Contract operations ===
Date	Player	Pos.	Notes	Ref.
November 19, 2024	(United States) Penelope Hocking	FW	Re-signed to a three year extension through 2027 with mutual options for up to two additional seasons.	
November 20, 2024	(United States) Maddie Moreau	DF	Re-signed to a one-year extension through 2025 with an option.	
December 9, 2024	(United States) Emmie Allen	GK	Re-signed to a one-year contract through 2025 with an option.	
December 9, 2024	(United States) Caroline Conti	MF	Re-signed to a one-year contract through 2025 with an option.	
December 9, 2024	(United States) Jamie Shepherd	MF	Re-signed to a one-year contract through 2025 with an option.	
July 1, 2025	(United States) Emmie Allen	GK	Re-signed to a two-year contract through 2027 with a mutual option for 2028.	
July 1, 2025	(United States) Joelle Anderson	MF	Re-signed to a two-year contract through 2027 with a mutual option for 2028.	
July 1, 2025	(United States) Maddie Moreau	DF	Re-signed to a two-year contract through 2027 with a mutual option for 2028.	
July 1, 2025	(United States) Jamie Shepherd	MF	Re-signed to a two-year contract through 2027 with a mutual option for 2028.	
July 1, 2025	(United States) Catherine Paulson	MF	Re-signed through 2025.	
July 16, 2025	(United States) Caroline Conti	MF	Re-signed to a three-year contract through 2027 with a team option for 2028.	
August 5, 2025	(United States) Jordan Silkowitz	GK	Re-signed to a three-year contract through 2027 with a team option for 2028.	
August 27, 2025	(Canada) Sydney Collins	DF	Re-signed to a two-year contract through 2027 with a team option for 2028.	

=== Loans in ===
Date	Player	Pos.	Previous club	Fee/notes	Ref.
August 28, 2025	(Canada) Brooklyn Courtnall	DF	(United States) North Carolina Courage	Loaned through the end of the 2025 NWSL season.	

=== Loans out ===
Date	Player	Pos.	Destination club	Fee/notes	Ref.
July 28, 2025	(United States) Jordan Brewster	DF	(Mexico) Club América	Loaned through the end of the 2025 NWSL season.	

=== Transfers in ===
Date	Player	Pos.	Previous club	Fee/notes	Ref.
December 30, 2024	(United States) Karlie Lema	FW	(United States) California Golden Bears	Rookie signed to a three-year contract through 2027 with an option.	
January 9, 2025	(United States) Taylor Huff	MF	(United States) Florida State Seminoles	Rookie signed to a three-year contract through 2027 with an option.	
January 31, 2025	(United States) Kelli Hubly	DF	(United States) Portland Thorns FC	Signed to a two-year contract through 2026.	
February 7, 2025	(United States) Hannah Bebar	MF	(United States) Duke Blue Devils	Signed to a three-year contract through 2027.	
March 10, 2025	(United States) Catherine Paulson	FW	(United States) Bay FC	Preseason trialist signed to a contract through June 30, 2025.	
July 15, 2025	(United States) Onyeka Gamero	FW	(Spain) Barcelona	Acquired in exchange for an undisclosed transfer fee and signed to a four-year contract through 2028.	
July 18, 2025	(United States) Leah Freeman	GK	(United States) Duke Blue Devils	Rookie signed through 2025.	
August 22, 2025	(Canada) Sydney Collins	DF	(United States) North Carolina Courage	Acquired in exchange for $60,000 in intra-league transfer funds.	

=== Transfers out ===
Date	Player	Pos.	Destination club	Fee/notes	Ref.
December 10, 2024	(United States) Maya Doms	MF	(Italy) Sassuolo	Out of contract.	
December 10, 2024	(United States) Catherine Paulson	MF	(United States) Bay FC	Out of contract.	
December 18, 2024	(United States) Alex Loera	MF	(United States) Utah Royals	In exchange for $25,000 in intra-league transfer funds and a 15% sell-on fee.	
January 21, 2025	(Scotland) Jen Beattie	DF	Retired		
January 23, 2025	(Venezuela) Deyna Castellanos	MF	(United States) Portland Thorns FC	Released into free agency by mutual agreement.	
February 3, 2025	(United States) Savy King	DF	(United States) Angel City FC	In exchange for a total of $300,000 in intra-league transfer funds and a 10% sell-on fee.	
February 14, 2025	(United States) Katelyn Rowland	GK	Retired		
August 15, 2025	(Ghana) Princess Marfo	FW	(Denmark) FC Nordsjælland	Mutual contract termination.	
September 2, 2025	(Nigeria) Asisat Oshoala	FW	(Saudi Arabia) Al-Hilal	Transferred in exchange for an undisclosed fee.	

== See also ==
- 2025 National Women's Soccer League season
- 2025 in American soccer
