= 2024 Bay FC season =

Bay FC's 2024 National Women's Soccer League season

Bay FC
2024 season
- Majority Owner: Sixth Street Partners
- Head Coach: Albertin Montoya
- Stadium: PayPal Park
- NWSL: 7th
- Playoffs: Quarterfinals
- NWSL x Liga MX Femenil Summer Cup: Group stage
- Top goalscorer: League: Asisat Oshoala (7); All: Asisat Oshoala (8)
- Highest home attendance: 18,000
- Lowest home attendance: 10,367
- Average home league attendance: 13,617
Home colors	Away colors
- All statistics correct as of November 10, 2024.

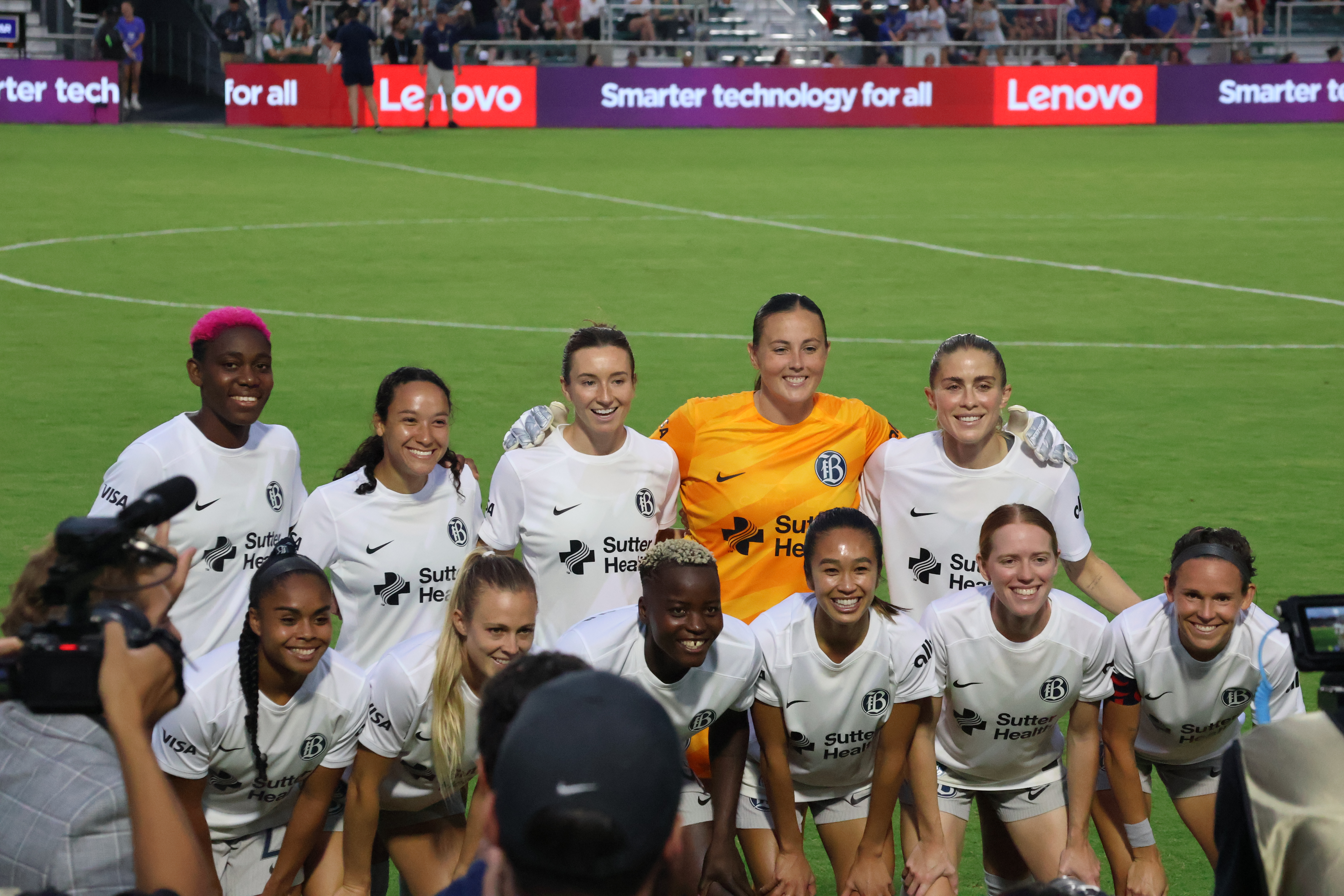
Week 20 starting lineup: Oshoala, Malonson, Bailey, Rowland, Dahlkemper Pickett, Hill, Kundananji, Dydasco, Boade, Menges

The 2024 Bay FC season was Bay FC's inaugural season as a professional women's soccer team. It played in the National Women's Soccer League, where it finished the season in seventh place to qualify for the playoffs and was eliminated in the quarterfinals by the second-seeded Washington Spirit.

== Background ==
On April 4, 2023, the NWSL formally awarded one of its two planned 2024 expansion teams to a Bay Area group led by former US Women's National Team players Brandi Chastain, Leslie Osborne, Danielle Slaton, and Aly Wagner, backed by majority owners and San Francisco-based investment firm Sixth Street Partners. The expansion fee was reported to be $53 million.

== Team ==
=== Squad ===
As of November 10, 2024.

No.	Pos.	Nation	Player
0	GK	USA	Katelyn Rowland
1	GK	USA	Melissa Lowder
2	DF	USA	Savy King
3	DF	USA	Caprice Dydasco
4	DF	USA	Emily Menges
5	DF	SCO	Jen Beattie
6	MF	USA	Maya Doms
7	FW	GHA	Princess Marfo
8	FW	NGR	Asisat Oshoala
9	FW	ZAM	Racheal Kundananji
10	MF	VEN	Deyna Castellanos
12	MF	USA	Tess Boade
13	DF	USA	Abby Dahlkemper
14	MF	USA	Jamie Shepherd
15	MF	USA	Caroline Conti
16	DF	USA	Jordan Brewster
17	MF	USA	Catherine Paulson
18	MF	USA	Joelle Anderson
19	MF	USA	Dorian Bailey
20	DF	USA	Alyssa Malonson
21	FW	USA	Rachel Hill
22	DF	USA	Alex Loera
23	DF	USA	Kiki Pickett
24	DF	USA	Maddie Moreau
32	GK	USA	Emmie Allen
55	FW	USA	Penelope Hocking

== Competitions ==
=== Preseason ===
February 20 Coachella Valley Invitational	San Diego Wave FC	2–1	Bay FC	Indio, California
12:00 PM PST	Bennett 39'; Ali 78'	Report	Doms 53'	Stadium: Empire Polo Club

February 24 Coachella Valley Invitational	Angel City FC	0–0	Bay FC	Indio, California
1:00 PM PST		Report		Stadium: Empire Polo Club

=== Friendlies ===
August 27, 2024 US Tour	Bay FC (United States)	2–5	(Spain) Barcelona	San Jose, California
	Oshoala 18'; Kundananji 32'	Report	Kika 22'; Graham Hansen 35'; Mapi León 67'; Pina 90+1'; Patri 90+3'	Stadium: PayPal Park

=== Regular season ===
March 17, 2024 1	Angel City FC	0–1	Bay FC	Los Angeles, California
4:30 PM PDT		Report	Oshoala 17' (Boade); Loera (yellow card) 31'	Stadium: BMO Stadium; Attendance: 22,000; Referee: Alyssa Nichols

March 23, 2024 2	Washington Spirit	2–1	Bay FC	Washington, District of Columbia
4:30 PM PDT	Hershfelt 23' (Rodman); Rodman (yellow card) 59'; Bethune 90+5' (Hatch)	Report	Bailey 11' (Oshoala); Camberos (yellow card) 48'	Stadium: Audi Field; Attendance: 11,734; Referee: Danielle Chesky

March 30, 2024 3	Bay FC	2–3	Houston Dash	San Jose, California
7:00 PM PDT	Oshoala (yellow card) 16'; Castellanos 19' (yellow card) 90+13'; Kundananji 90+3'	Report	Puntigam (yellow card) 44'; Ordóñez 66' (Sánchez), 87'; Patterson (yellow card) 90+2'; Solaun 90+10'	Stadium: PayPal Park; Attendance: 18,000; Referee: Abdou Ndiaye

April 14, 2024 4	Bay FC	3–2	Seattle Reign FC	San Jose, California
5:00 PM PDT	Sharples 48' (Menges); Loera 58'; Anderson 97' (King)	Report	Sharples 27' (o.g.); Balcer 83' (Ji)	Stadium: PayPal Park; Attendance: 16,719; Referee: Ekaterina Koroleva

April 20, 2024 5	Kansas City Current	5–2	Bay FC	Kansas City, Missouri
11:30 AM PDT	Bia 2', 73'; Feist 6' (Spaanstra); Chawinga 56' (DiBernardo), 62' (DiBernardo)	Report	Sharples 17' (Castellanos) (yellow card) 23'; Boade 78' (Anderson); Princess (yellow card) 87'	Stadium: CPKC Stadium; Attendance: 11,500; Referee: Rebecca Pagan

April 27, 2024 6	San Diego Wave FC	2–1	Bay FC	San Diego, California
7:00 PM PDT	Colaprico (yellow card) 6'; Doniak 13' (Ascanio); Shaw 78' (Bennett)	Report	Oshoala 48'; Kundananji (yellow card) 83'	Stadium: Snapdragon Stadium; Attendance: 17,206; Referee: Elvis Osmanovic

May 1, 2024 7	Bay FC	2–3	Portland Thorns FC	San Jose, California
7:00 PM PDT	Kundananji 41' (Anderson); Castellanos 60' (Kundananji)	Report	Linnehan (yellow card) 45+6'; Smith 7' (Linnehan), 78' (Sheva); Dias (yellow card) 90+1'	Stadium: PayPal Park; Attendance: 10,611; Referee: Greg Dopka

May 5, 2024 8	Bay FC	1–2	Chicago Red Stars	San Jose, California
5:00 PM PDT	Boade 8'; Sharples (yellow card) 79'	Report	Hocking 30' (Staab) (yellow card) 61'; Schlegel 63'	Stadium: PayPal Park; Attendance: 14,317; Referee: Elijio Arreguin

May 11, 2024 9	Orlando Pride	1–0	Bay FC	Orlando, Florida
7:30 PM PDT	Sams (yellow card) 7'; Adriana 32' (pen.); Rafaelle (yellow card) 52'		Malonson (yellow card) 6'; Kundananji (yellow card) 67'; Camberos (yellow card) 79'	Stadium: Inter&Co Stadium; Attendance: 7,707; Referee: Danielle Chesky

May 17, 2024 10	Bay FC	2–1	San Diego Wave FC	San Jose, California
7:30 PM PDT	Boade (yellow card) 35'; Camberos 55' (Pickett); Lundkvist 87' (o.g.)	Report	Carusa 23'; McCaskill (yellow card) 80'	Stadium: PayPal Park; Attendance: 16,930; Referee: Brad Jensen

May 24, 2024 11	Bay FC	0–2	NJ/NY Gotham FC	San Jose, California
7:00 PM PDT	Kundananji (yellow card) 49'	Report	Ella Stevens 31' (González), 33'	Stadium: PayPal Park; Attendance: 12,643; Referee: Alyssa Nichols

June 8, 2024 12	Chicago Red Stars	1–2	Bay FC	Chicago, Illinois
4:30 PM PDT	Malham (yellow card) 17'; Hocking 90+3' (Groom)	Report	Pickett 25'; Anderson 79'	Stadium: Wrigley Field; Attendance: 35,038; Referee: Alex Billeter

June 16, 2024 13	Bay FC	0–1	Utah Royals	San Jose, California
7:00 PM PDT	Anderson (yellow card) 37'; Dydasco (yellow card) 45'; Sharples (yellow card) 80'; Boade (yellow card) 88'	Report	Del Fava 89' (Sentnor)	Stadium: PayPal Park; Attendance: 10,367; Referee: Anya Voigt

June 22, 2024 14	Bay FC	1–0	Angel City FC	San Jose, California
7:00 PM PDT	Boade 33'; King (yellow card) 34'; Beattie (yellow card) 45+4'; Kundananji (yellow card) 85'	Report	Le Bihan (yellow card) 36'; Dougherty Howard (yellow card) 89'	Stadium: PayPal Park; Attendance: 15,640; Referee: Thomas Snyder

June 29, 2024 15	Racing Louisville FC	0–1	Bay FC	Louisville, Kentucky
1:00 PM PDT	Baggett (yellow card) 76'	Report	Anderson (yellow card) 13'; Oshoala 76' (pen.)	Stadium: Lynn Family Stadium; Attendance: 8,096; Referee: Laura Rodriguez

July 6, 2024 16	Bay FC	0–3	Washington Spirit	San Jose, California
7:00 PM PDT	Rowland (yellow card) 3'; Sharples (yellow card) 81'	Report	Morris 4'; Rodman 21' (pen.); Sarr 57' (Morris); Carle (yellow card) 82'	Stadium: PayPal Park; Attendance: 11,384; Referee: Matthew Corrigan

August 23, 2024 17	Utah Royals	2-1	Bay FC	Sandy, Utah
6:30 PM PDT	Monaghan 48' (Tejada); Menges 55' (o.g.); Tejada (yellow card) 87'	Report	Kundananji 83' (Hill)	Stadium: America First Field; Attendance: 14,539; Referee: Jaclyn Metz

August 30, 2024 18	Portland Thorns FC	1–3	Bay FC	Portland, Oregon
7:00 PM PDT	Smith 32'; Fleming (yellow card) 83'	Report	Dahlkemper 7'; Hill 18'; Bailey (yellow card) 35'; Anderson 70'; Kundananji (yellow card) 73'	Stadium: Providence Park; Attendance: 18,018; Referee: Shawn Tehini

September 7, 2024 19	Bay FC	1-0	Racing Louisville FC	San Jose, California
7:00 PM PDT	Oshoala 75' (Hocking) (yellow card) 82'	Report		Stadium: PayPal Park; Attendance: 11,478; Referee: Rebecca Pagan

September 13, 2024 20	North Carolina Courage	1–1	Bay FC	Cary, North Carolina
5:00 PM PDT	O'Sullivan (yellow card) 14'; Sanchez 28' (O'Sullivan)	Report	Oshoala 9' (Boade)	Stadium: WakeMed Soccer Park; Attendance: 6,837; Referee: John Griggs

September 20, 2024 21	Bay FC	0–1	Orlando Pride	San Jose, California
7:30 PM PDT	Moreau (yellow card) 76'	Report	Banda 84'	Stadium: PayPal Park; Attendance: 11,063; Referee: Brad Jensen

September 29, 2024 22	Seattle Reign FC	0–1	Bay FC	Seattle, Washington
3:00 PM PDT		Report	Oshoala 27' (pen.); Dydasco (yellow card) 58'	Stadium: Lumen Field; Attendance: 9,051; Referee: Elton Garcia

October 5, 2024 23	NJ/NY Gotham FC	5–1	Bay FC	Harrison, New Jersey
4:30 PM PDT	Nighswonger 9' (pen.); Lavelle 69'; González 71', 73'; Kizer 83'	Report	Oshoala 17'	Stadium: Red Bull Arena; Referee: Sergii Demianchuk

October 12, 2024 24	Bay FC	0–1	Kansas City Current	San Jose, California
7:30 PM PDT	Hocking (yellow card) 33'; Oshoala (yellow card) 35'	Report; Report	Chawinga 34'; Mace (yellow card) 40'; DiBernardo (yellow card) 90+2'; Wheeler (yellow card) 90+4'	Stadium: PayPal Park; Attendance: 12,974; Referee: Danielle Chesky

October 19, 2024 25	Bay FC	1–0	North Carolina Courage	San Jose, California
7:00 PM PDT	Pickett (yellow card) 60'; Dahlkemper 83'	Report	Hopkins (yellow card) 90+1'	Stadium: PayPal Park; Attendance: 14,901; Referee: Elijio Arreguin

November 2, 2024 26	Houston Dash	2–3	Bay FC	Houston, Texas
6:30 PM PDT	Olivieri 15'; Nagasato (yellow card) 38'; Nielsen (yellow card) 45'; Patterson 46'	Report	Nielsen 9' (o.g.); Kundanaji 20', 53' (yellow card) 60'	Stadium: Shell Energy Stadium; Attendance: 8,176; Referee: Matthew Thompson

==== Regular season standings ====
Pos	Team	Pld	W	D	L	GF	GA	GD	Pts	Qualification
5	North Carolina Courage	26	12	3	11	34	28	+6	39	Playoffs
6	Portland Thorns FC	26	10	4	12	37	35	+2	34	Playoffs
7	Bay FC	26	11	1	14	31	41	−10	34	Playoffs
8	Chicago Red Stars	26	10	2	14	31	38	−7	32	Playoffs
9	Racing Louisville FC	26	7	7	12	33	39	−6	28	

Source: NWSL
Rules for classification: Tiebreakers

==== Results summary ====
Overall								Home						Away					
Pld	W	D	L	GF	GA	GD	Pts	W	D	L	GF	GA	GD	W	D	L	GF	GA	GD
26	11	1	14	31	41	−10	34	5	0	8	13	19	−6	6	1	6	18	22	−4

Last updated: November 2, 2024.
Source: NWSLsoccer.com

==== Results by matchday ====
Matchday	1	2	3	4	5	6	7	8	9	10	11	12	13	14	15	16	17	18	19	20	21	22	23	24	25	26
Stadium	A	A	H	H	A	A	H	H	A	H	H	A	H	H	A	H	A	A	H	A	H	A	A	H	H	A
Result	W	L	L	W	L	L	L	L	L	W	L	W	L	W	W	L	L	W	W	D	L	W	L	L	W	W
Position (Note: Bay's position at the end of the day on which their match was played.)	5	7	10	6	8	10	12	13	11	12	10	12	11	11	8	8	10	8	7	8	9	8	8	8	8	7

Updated to match(es) played on November 3, 2024. Source: NWSL
A = Away; H = Home; W = Win; D = Draw 1; L = Loss

=== Playoffs ===
Bay FC finished the regular season in 7th place and qualified for the NWSL playoffs as the seventh-seeded of eight teams.

==== Matches ====
November 10, 2024 Quarterfinals	Washington Spirit	2–1 (a.e.t.)	Bay FC	Washington, District of Columbia
12:30 p.m. EST (UTC−5)	Hershfelt (yellow card) 46'; McKeown 86'; Dydasco 96' (o.g.)	Report	Malonson (yellow card) 59'; Oshoala 82'; Pickett (yellow card) 99'	Stadium: Audi Field; Attendance: 19,215; Referee: Katja Koroleva

=== NWSL x Liga MX Femenil Summer Cup ===
Pos	Team	Pld	W	PW	PL	L	GF	GA	GD	Pts	Qualification	LA	SD	AME	BAY
1	(United States Soccer Federation) Angel City FC	3	2	1	0	0	4	1	+3	8	Advances to knockout stage	—	0–0	2–1	2–0
2	(United States Soccer Federation) San Diego Wave FC	3	1	0	1	1	3	3	0	4		0–0	—	0–2	3–1
3	(Mexican Football Federation) Club América	3	1	0	0	2	4	4	0	3		1–2	2–0	—	1–2
4	(United States Soccer Federation) Bay FC	3	1	0	0	2	3	6	−3	3		0–2	1–3	2–1	—

Source: NWSL
Rules for classification: tiebreakers

July 20, 2024 1	San Diego Wave FC (United States)	3–1	(United States) Bay FC	San Diego, California
7:00 p.m. PDT (UTC-7)	Wesley 45+1'; Sánchez 53'; Ali 80'	Report	Moreau 63'	Stadium: Torero Stadium; Attendance: 5,153; Referee: Iryna Petrunok

July 26, 2024 2	Bay FC (United States)	0–2	(United States) Angel City FC	San Jose, California
5:00 p.m. PDT (UTC-7)		Report	Bailey 18' (o.g.); Emslie 54'	Stadium: PayPal Park; Attendance: 9,766; Referee: Adam Zarrin

August 2, 2024 3	Bay FC (United States)	2–1	(Mexico) Club América	San Jose, California
7:30 p.m. PDT (UTC-7)	Moreau 7'; Bailey 53'	Report	Camberos 29'	Stadium: PayPal Park; Attendance: 10,192; Referee: Laura Rodriguez

== Statistics ==
As of match played November 10, 2024

=== Appearances ===
Starting appearances are listed first, followed by substitute appearances after the + symbol where applicable.

No.	Pos	Nat	Player	Total		NWSL		Playoffs		Summer Cup	
No.	Pos	Nat	Player	Apps	Goals	Apps	Goals	Apps	Goals	Apps	Goals
Goalkeepers
0	GK	(United States) USA	Katelyn Rowland	23	0	20	0	1	0	2	0
1	GK	(United States) USA	Melissa Lowder	0	0	0	0	0	0	0	0
29	GK	(United States) USA	Jordan Silkowitz	0	0	0	0	0	0	0	0
32	GK	(United States) USA	Emmie Allen	1	0	0	0	0	0	1	0
Defenders
2	DF	(United States) USA	Savy King	20	0	12+6	0	0	0	1+1	0
3	DF	(United States) USA	Caprice Dydasco	29	0	22+3	0	1	0	2+1	0
4	DF	(United States) USA	Emily Menges	28	0	25+1	0	1	0	1	0
5	DF	(Scotland) SCO	Jen Beattie	10	0	6+2	0	0	0	2	0
13	DF	(United States) USA	Abby Dahlkemper	10	2	9	2	1	0	0	0
16	DF	(United States) USA	Jordan Brewster	4	0	0+1	0	0	0	2+1	0
20	DF	(United States) USA	Alyssa Malonson	26	0	16+6	0	1	0	1+2	0
23	DF	(United States) USA	Kiki Pickett	24	1	18+2	1	1	0	1+2	0
24	DF	(United States) USA	Maddie Moreau	15	2	2+9	0	0+1	0	3	2
Midfielders
6	MF	(United States) USA	Maya Doms	3	0	0+1	0	0	0	2	0
10	MF	(Venezuela) VEN	Deyna Castellanos	24	2	12+8	2	0+1	0	3	0
12	MF	(United States) USA	Tess Boade	27	3	23+2	3	1	0	1	0
14	MF	(United States) USA	Jamie Shepherd	4	0	2	0	0	0	2	0
15	MF	(United States) USA	Caroline Conti	10	0	1+7	0	0	0	2	0
17	MF	(United States) USA	Catherine Paulson	0	0	0	0	0	0	0	0
18	MF	(United States) USA	Joelle Anderson	20	3	10+7	3	0	0	0+3	0
19	MF	(United States) USA	Dorian Bailey	30	2	18+8	1	1	0	3	1
22	MF	(United States) USA	Alex Loera	4	1	4	1	0	0	0	0
Forwards
7	FW	(Ghana) GHA	Princess Marfo	11	0	2+7	0	0	0	0+2	0
8	FW	(Nigeria) NGR	Asisat Oshoala	26	8	23+2	7	1	1	0	0
9	FW	(Zambia) ZAM	Racheal Kundananji	22	5	20+1	5	1	0	0	0
21	FW	(United States) USA	Rachel Hill	20	1	12+6	1	1	0	1	0
55	FW	(United States) USA	Penelope Hocking	9	0	3+5	0	0+1	0	0	0
Players who left the club during the season:
11	FW	(Mexico) MEX	Scarlett Camberos	10	1	8+2	1	0	0	0	0
27	DF	(United States) USA	Kayla Sharples	17	2	12+3	2	0	0	1+1	0
44	GK	(Canada) CAN	Lysianne Proulx	6	0	6	0	0	0	0	0

=== Goals ===
Rank	No.	Pos.	Nat.	Name	NWSL	Playoffs	Summer Cup	Total
1	8	FW	(Nigeria)	Asisat Oshoala	7	1	0	8
2	9	FW	(Zambia)	Racheal Kundananji	5	0	0	5
3	12	MF	(United States)	Tess Boade	3	0	0	3
3	18	MF	(United States)	Joelle Anderson	3	0	0	3
4	10	MF	(Venezuela)	Deyna Castellanos	2	0	0	2
4	13	DF	(United States)	Abby Dahlkemper	2	0	0	2
4	27	DF	(United States)	Kayla Sharples	2	0	0	2
5	19	MF	(United States)	Dorian Bailey	1	0	1	2
6	24	DF	(United States)	Maddie Moreau	0	0	2	2
7	11	FW	(Mexico)	Scarlett Camberos	1	0	0	1
7	21	FW	(United States)	Rachel Hill	1	0	0	1
7	22	MF	(United States)	Alex Loera	1	0	0	1
7	23	DF	(United States)	Kiki Pickett	1	0	0	1
Own goals					2	0	0	2
Total					31	1	3	35

=== Assists ===
Rank	No.	Pos.	Nat.	Name	NWSL	Playoffs	Summer Cup	Total
1	9	FW	(Zambia)	Racheal Kundananji	4	0	0	4
2	4	DF	(United States)	Emily Menges	2	0	0	2
2	12	MF	(United States)	Tess Boade	2	0	0	2
2	2	DF	(United States)	Savy King	2	0	0	2
2	18	MF	(United States)	Joelle Anderson	2	0	0	2
2	19	MF	(United States)	Dorian Bailey	2	0	0	2
2	21	FW	(United States)	Rachel Hill	2	0	0	2
3	55	FW	(United States)	Penelope Hocking	1	1	0	2
4	8	FW	(Nigeria)	Asisat Oshoala	1	0	0	1
4	10	MF	(Venezuela)	Deyna Castellanos	1	0	0	1
4	23	DF	(United States)	Kiki Pickett	1	0	0	1
5	5	DF	(Scotland)	Jen Beattie	0	0	1	1
Total					20	1	1	22

=== Clean sheets ===
Rank	No.	Nat.	Name	NWSL	Playoffs	Summer Cup	Total
1	0	(United States)	Katelyn Rowland	5	0	0	5
2	44	(Canada)	Lysianne Proulx	1	0	0	1
Total				6	0	0	6

=== Disciplinary record ===
No.	Pos.	Nat.	Name	NWSL			Playoffs			Summer Cup			Total		
No.	Pos.	Nat.	Name	Yellow card	(yellow card) (yellow-red card)	Red card	Yellow card	(yellow card) (yellow-red card)	Red card	Yellow card	(yellow card) (yellow-red card)	Red card	Yellow card	(yellow card) (yellow-red card)	Red card
0	GK	(United States)	Katelyn Rowland	1	0	0	0	0	0	0	0	0	1	0	0
2	DF	(United States)	Savy King	1	0	0	0	0	0	0	0	0	1	0	0
3	DF	(United States)	Caprice Dydasco	2	0	0	0	0	0	0	0	0	2	0	0
5	DF	(Scotland)	Jen Beattie	1	0	0	0	0	0	0	0	0	1	0	0
7	FW	(Ghana)	Princess Marfo	1	0	0	0	0	0	0	0	0	1	0	0
8	FW	(Nigeria)	Asisat Oshoala	3	0	0	1	0	0	0	0	0	4	0	0
9	FW	(Zambia)	Racheal Kundananji	6	0	0	0	0	0	0	0	0	6	0	0
10	MF	(Venezuela)	Deyna Castellanos	1	0	0	0	0	0	0	0	0	1	0	0
11	FW	(Mexico)	Scarlett Camberos	2	0	0	0	0	0	0	0	0	2	0	0
12	MF	(United States)	Tess Boade	2	0	0	0	0	0	0	0	0	2	0	0
18	MF	(United States)	Joelle Anderson	2	0	0	0	0	0	0	0	0	2	0	0
19	MF	(United States)	Dorian Bailey	1	0	0	0	0	0	0	0	0	1	0	0
20	DF	(United States)	Alyssa Malonson	1	0	0	1	0	0	0	0	0	2	0	0
22	MF	(United States)	Alex Loera	1	0	0	0	0	0	0	0	0	1	0	0
23	DF	(United States)	Kiki Pickett	1	0	0	1	0	0	0	0	0	2	0	0
24	DF	(United States)	Maddie Moreau	1	0	0	0	0	0	0	0	0	1	0	0
27	DF	(United States)	Kayla Sharples	4	0	0	0	0	0	0	0	0	4	0	0
55	FW	(United States)	Penelope Hocking	1	0	0	0	0	0	0	0	0	1	0	0
Total				32	0	0	3	0	0	0	0	0	35	0	0

== Transactions ==
=== 2024 NWSL Expansion Draft ===
The 2024 NWSL Expansion Draft was held on December 15, 2023.

Pick	Nat.	Player	Pos.	Previous team	Ref.
1	(United States)	Alyssa Malonson	DF	Seattle Reign FC	
3	(United States)	Tess Boade	FW	OL Reign	
5	(United States)	Rachel Hill	FW	San Diego Wave FC	
7	(United States)	Katelyn Rowland	GK	North Carolina Courage	
9	PASS				
11	PASS				
12	(United States)	Sierra Enge	MF	San Diego Wave FC	

=== 2024 NWSL Draft ===
Draft picks are not automatically signed to the team roster. The 2024 NWSL Draft was held on December 14, 2023.

Round	Pick	Player	Pos.	College	Status
1	2	(United States) Savannah King	DF	North Carolina	Signed
1	8	(United States) Maya Doms	MF	Stanford	Signed
3	30	(United States) Jamie Shepherd	MF	BYU	Signed
3	34	(United States) Caroline Conti	MF	Clemson	Signed
4	55	(Tonga) Laveni Vaka	DF	Georgia	Not signed

=== Re-signings ===
Date	Player	Pos.	Notes	Ref.
August 26, 2024	(United States) Abby Dahlkemper	DF	Re-signed to a two-year extension through 2026 with a mutual option.	
August 29, 2024	(United States) Alyssa Malonson	DF	Re-signed to a three-year extension through 2027.	
September 29, 2024	(United States) Jordan Silkowitz	GK	Re-signed to a two-year extension through 2026.	
October 11, 2024	(United States) Catherine Paulson	MF	Former national team replacement player re-signed to a contract through the remainder of 2024.	

=== Transfers in ===
Date	Player	Pos.	Previous club	Fee/notes	Ref.
November 15, 2023	(United States) Alex Loera	MF	(United States) Kansas City Current	Acquired in a trade in exchange for $175,000 in allocation money and protection from Bay FC in the 2024 NWSL Expansion Draft.	
November 21, 2023	(United States) Caprice Dydasco	DF	(United States) Houston Dash	Free agent signing.	
December 12, 2023	(United States) Dorian Bailey	DF	(United States) Washington Spirit	Acquired in a trade in exchange for protection from Bay FC in the 2024 NWSL Expansion Draft.	
December 12, 2023	(United States) Emily Menges	DF	(United States) Portland Thorns FC	Acquired in a trade in exchange for $75,000 in allocation money and protection in the 2024 NWSL Expansion Draft.	
December 12, 2023	(United States) Ellie Jean	DF	(United States) NJ/NY Gotham FC	Acquired in a three-team trade in exchange for protection in the 2024 NWSL Expansion Draft. Bay also received $130,000 in allocation money from Racing Louisville FC.	
December 12, 2023	(Mexico) Scarlett Camberos	FW	(United States) Angel City FC	Acquired in a trade in exchange for $50,000 in allocation money and protection from Bay FC in the 2024 NWSL Expansion Draft.	
December 12, 2023	(United States) Joelle Anderson	MF	(United States) Houston Dash	Acquired in a trade along with $25,000 in Allocation Money in exchange for protection from Bay FC in the 2024 NWSL Expansion Draft.	
December 21, 2023	(United States) Kayla Sharples	DF	(United States) Chicago Red Stars	Free agent signing.	
January 21, 2024	(United States) Kiki Pickett	DF	(United States) North Carolina Courage	Free agent signing.	
January 25, 2024	(United States) Melissa Lowder	GK	(Iceland) Þór/KA	Free agent signing. Was a Preseason Non-Roster Invitee.	
January 26, 2024	(Venezuela) Deyna Castellanos	MF	(United States) Manchester City W.F.C.	Transfer with fee from Manchester City	
January 30, 2024	(Ghana) Princess Marfo	FW	(Denmark) FC Nordsjælland	Transfer with fee from FC Nordsjælland.	
February 1, 2024	(Nigeria) Asisat Oshoala	FW	(Spain) FC Barcelona	Transfer with fee from FC Barcelona.	
February 2, 2024	(Scotland) Jen Beattie	DF	(England) Arsenal	Transfer with fee from Arsenal.	
February 8, 2024	(Canada) Lysianne Proulx	GK	(Australia) Melbourne City FC	Transfer with fee from Melbourne City FC.	
February 13, 2024	(Zambia) Racheal Kundananji	FW	(Spain) Madrid CFF	Transfer with fee from Madrid CFF.	
March 11, 2024	(United States) Jordan Brewster	DF	(Sweden) Kristianstads DFF	Free agent signing.	
March 13, 2024	(United States) Emmie Allen	GK	(United States) North Carolina Tar Heels	Free agent signing. Was a Preseason Non-Roster Invitee.	
March 15, 2024	(United States) Maddie Moreau	DF	(United States) West Virginia Mountaineers	Free agent signing. Was a Preseason Non-Roster Invitee.	
August 26, 2024	(United States) Abby Dahlkemper	DF	(United States) San Diego Wave FC	Acquired in a trade in exchange for $50,000 in allocation money.	
August 27, 2024	(United States) Catherine Paulson	MF	(United States) Stanford Cardinal	Signed to a national team replacement contract.	
August 28, 2024	(United States) Jordan Silkowitz	GK	(United States) Kansas City Current	Acquired in a trade along with $15,000 in allocation money in exchange for Kayla Sharples.	
August 31, 2024	(United States) Penelope Hocking	FW	(United States) Chicago Red Stars	Acquired in a trade in exchange for a two-year total of $350,000 in intra-league transfer funds.	

=== Transfers out ===
Date	Player	Pos.	Destination club	Fee/notes	Ref.
December 17, 2023	(United States) Sierra Enge	MF	(United States) Houston Dash	Traded in exchange for $50,000 in allocation money.	
December 18, 2023	(United States) Ellie Jean	DF	(United States) Racing Louisville FC	Traded in exchange for $40,000 in Alternative Allocation Money. Bay also received $130,000 in Allocation Money on December 12, as part of this trade.	
July 25, 2024	(Mexico) Scarlett Camberos	FW	(Mexico) Club América	Transferred in exchange for an undisclosed fee.	
August 26, 2024	(Canada) Lysianne Proulx	GK	(Italy) Juventus	Transferred in exchange for an undisclosed fee.	
August 28, 2024	(United States) Kayla Sharples	DF	(United States) Kansas City Current	Traded in exchange for $15,000 in allocation money and Jordan Silkowitz.	

=== Injury listings ===
Date	Player	Pos.	List	Injury	Ref.
March 11, 2024	(United States) Melissa Lowder	GK	Season-ending injury	Torn ACL.	
April 24, 2024	(United States) Alex Loera	MF	Season-ending injury	Torn ACL.	

=== Preseason trialists ===
Trialists are non-rostered invitees during preseason and are not automatically signed. Bay released their preseason roster on January 23, 2024.

Player	Position	Previous team
(United States) Emmie Allen	GK	(United States) North Carolina Tar Heels
(United States) Hailey Coll	GK	(United States) Oregon State Beavers
(United States) Melissa Lowder	GK	(Iceland) Þór/KA
(United States) Caitlin Cosme	DF	(United States) Orlando Pride
(United States) Maya Gordon	DF	(United States) LSU Tigers
(United States) Tegan McGrady	DF	(United States) Portland Thorns FC
(United States) Maya McCutcheon	MF	(United States) West Virginia Mountaineers
(United States) Maddie Moreau	MF	(United States) West Virginia Mountaineers
(United States) Brianna Visalli	MF	(Denmark) Aarhus GF
(United States) Jasmine Hamid	MF	(United States) Towson Tigers
(United States) Ru Mucherera	FW	(Republic of Ireland) Shelbourne F.C.
(United States) Shaelan Murison	FW	(United States) Oly Town FC
(England) Chioma Ubogagu	FW	(England) Tottenham Hotspur F.C.

Signed to first team contract.

== See also ==
- 2024 National Women's Soccer League season
- 2024 in American soccer
