= Princess Marfo =

Ghanaian association football player

Personal information
- Full name: Princess Dankwa Marfo
- Date of birth: 2 October 2003 (age 23)
- Place of birth: Ghana
- Position: Forward

Team information
- Current team: PSV

Youth career
- 2014–2022: Right To Dream Academy
- 2022: FC Nordsjælland

Senior career*
Years	Team	Apps	(Gls)
2022–2024	FC Nordsjælland	37	(3)
2024–2025	Bay FC	9	(0)
2025–2026	FC Nordsjælland	17	(5)
2026–	PSV	0	(0)

International career^{‡}
2024–	Ghana	1	(0)
- * Club domestic league appearances and goals as of 00:49, 23 June 2026 (UTC) ‡ National team caps and goals as of 27 August 2024

Princess Dankwa Marfo (born 2 October 2003) is a Ghanaian professional footballer who plays as a forward for Eredivisie club PSV and the Ghanaian national team. She has previously played for Danish A-Liga club FC Nordsjælland and Bay FC of the National Women's Soccer League (NWSL).

== Club career ==
Marfo joined the Right to Dream Academy in 2014 and was the first female graduate of the academy in 2022 when she turned 18. She made her senior team debut in March 2022, in a match against Fortuna Hjørring. The following season she scored her first goal for the club, on 14 October 2022 against Brøndby IF. She signed a two-year extension with the club on 24 June 2023.

On 30 January 2024, NWSL club Bay FC acquired Marfo through a transfer fee, signing her for a contract through the 2025 season with an option for 2026. In her first season with the team, Marfo played in 9 games. She did not make any appearances for Bay FC her second season and ended up mutually terminating her contract with the club on 15 August 2025.

In September 2025, Marfo re-joined her former club FC Nordsjælland.

On 22 June 2026, Dutch club PSV announced the signing of Marfo on a three-year deal.

== International career ==
Marfo holds both Ghanaian and Danish citizenship. In May 2023, she was being monitored by Ghana national football team coach Nora Häuptle while playing in Denmark. In July of the following year she gained her first call up to a Ghana senior national team squad, receiving her first cap as a substitute in a friendly match against Japan.

== International goals ==
No.	Date	Venue	Opponent	Score	Result	Competition
1.	13 August 2026	Larbi Zaouli Stadium, Casablanca, Morocco	Ivory Coast	1–1	2–1	2026 Women's Africa Cup of Nations

== Career statistics ==
=== Club ===
As of 15 August 2025

Club	Season	League			Cup (Note: Includes Danish Women's Cup, NWSL Challenge Cup)		Playoffs (Note: Includes NWSL Playoffs)		Other		Total	
Club	Season	Division	Apps	Goals	Apps	Goals	Apps	Goals	Apps	Goals	Apps	Goals
FC Nordsjælland	2021–22	Kvindeligaen	6	0	0	0	—		—		6	0
FC Nordsjælland	2022–23	Kvindeligaen	22	2	5	3	—		—		27	5
FC Nordsjælland	2023–24	Kvindeligaen	14	1	0	0	—		—		14	1
Bay FC	2024	NWSL	9	0	—		—		1 (Note: Includes the NWSL x Liga MX Femenil Summer Cup)	0	10	0
Bay FC	2025	NWSL	0	0	—		—		—		0	0
Career total			51	3	5	3	0	0	1	0	57	6

== Honors ==
FC Nordsjælland

- Danish Women's Cup: 2023
