= Joelle Anderson =

American soccer player (born 1998)

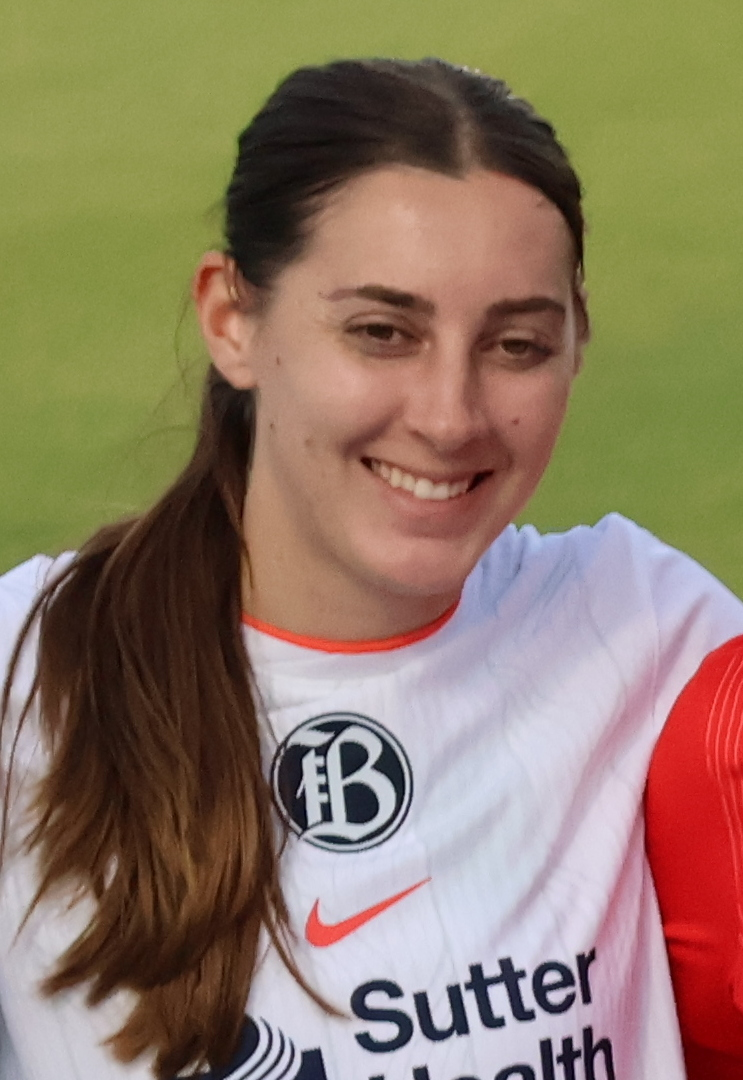
- Anderson with Bay FC in 2025

Personal information
- Full name: Joelle Marie Anderson
- Date of birth: October 6, 1998 (age 28)
- Place of birth: San Jose, California, U.S.
- Height: 5 ft 9 in (1.75 m)
- Positions: Center back; midfielder

Team information
- Current team: Bay FC
- Number: 18

Youth career
- 2007–2017: De Anza Force

College career
Years	Team	Apps	(Gls)
2017–2021	Pepperdine Waves	88	(35)

Senior career*
Years	Team	Apps	(Gls)
2022–2023	Houston Dash	26	(2)
2024–	Bay FC	63	(5)

International career
2018	United States U19	0	(0)
- * Club domestic league appearances and goals as of 05:04, November 2, 2026 (UTC)

Joelle Marie Anderson (born October 6, 1998) is an American professional soccer player who plays as a center back or midfielder for Bay FC of the National Women's Soccer League (NWSL). She played college soccer for the Pepperdine Waves before being selected by the Houston Dash in the 2021 NWSL College Draft.

== Early life ==
Anderson was born in San Jose, California, and attended the Harker School, where she played varsity soccer and scored 101 goals, the second most in school history. She was inducted into the school's athletics hall of fame on October 13, 2023. Anderson played youth club soccer with De Anza Force for a decade from 2007 through 2017.

== College career ==
Anderson attended Pepperdine University, where she played for the Pepperdine Waves from 2017 to 2021. She was named All-West Coast Conference (WCC) in each of her five seasons. In five years, she played in 88 games, scoring 35 times and registering 24 assists. Although selected by the Houston Dash in the 2021 NWSL Draft, Anderson opted to play one more season with Pepperdine before signing with Houston ahead of the 2022 NWSL season.

== Club career ==
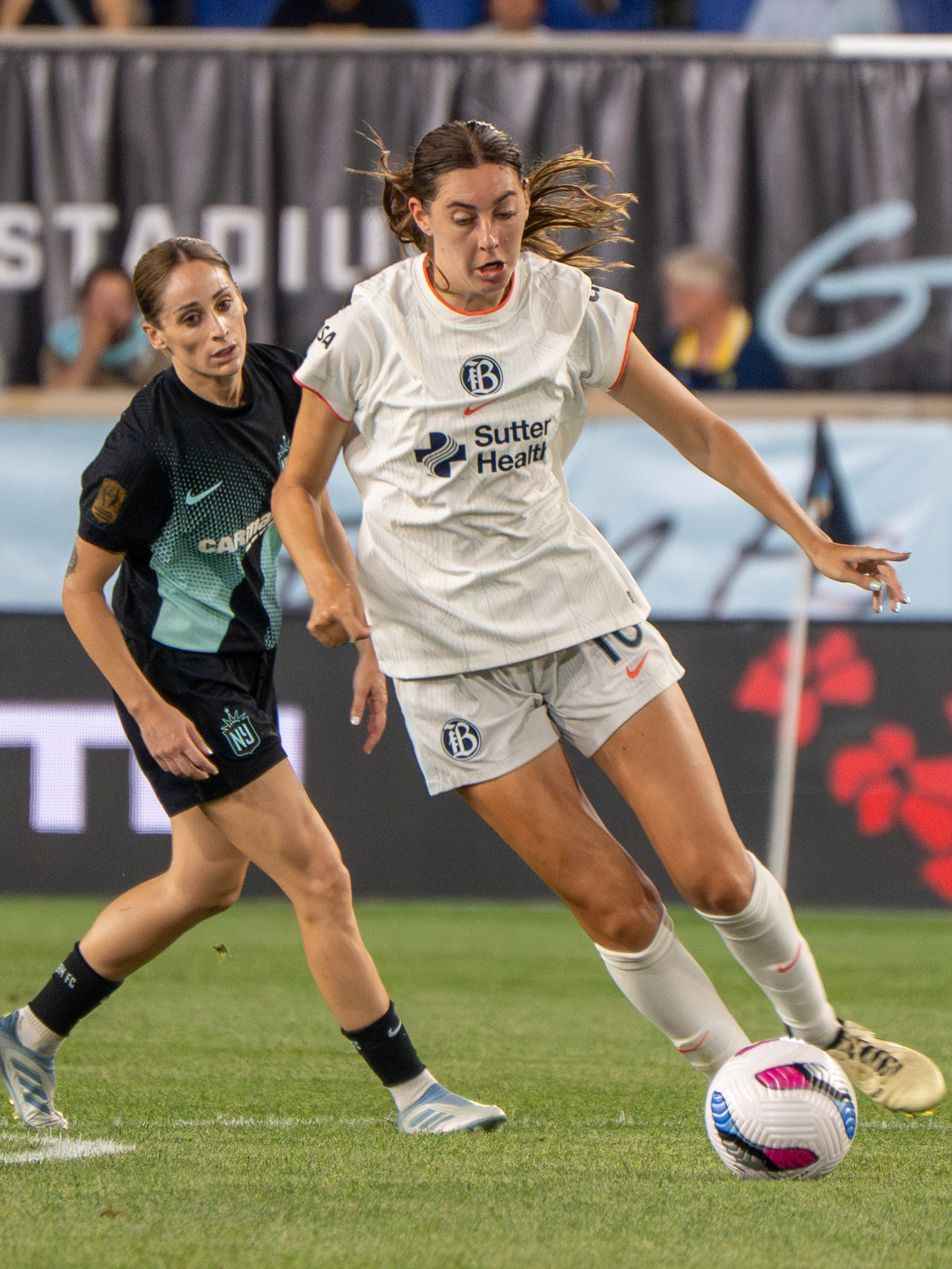
Anderson with Bay FC in 2025

=== Houston Dash ===
Anderson was drafted 26th overall in the third round of the 2021 NWSL College Draft by the Houston Dash. However, she opted to play one final year with Pepperdine before joining Houston in the NWSL. Anderson signed a two-year contract with Houston on January 14, 2022. Anderson made her first professional appearance on April 24, 2022, as a 56th-minute substitute in Houston's final match of the 2022 NWSL Challenge Cup group stage. She earned her first of two starts in the season on July 1, 2022, in a 2–1 loss to Kansas City Current. She scored her first professional goal on July 16, 2022, in a 4–1 victory against the Chicago Red Stars. Anderson gained more consistent starts and minutes in the 2023 NWSL season, making 13 starts and 21 total appearances. Her lone goal of the 2023 season came in a comeback victory against defending champions Portland Thorns on May 12, 2023.

=== Bay FC ===
On December 12, 2023, Anderson was acquired by NWSL expansion side Bay FC along with $25,000 in allocation money from the Houston Dash in exchange for 2024 NWSL Expansion Draft protection from Bay FC. The trade would see Anderson play for her hometown club. Anderson started in Bay FC's first NWSL match, a victory away to Angel City FC on March 19, 2024.

== International career ==
Anderson was called up for a United States under-19 national team camp in February 2018.

== Personal life ==
Anderson is the daughter of Michelle and Peter Anderson. She has two siblings. Her brother, Jeremiah, played soccer at Westmont College.

== Career statistics ==
=== Club ===
As of March 15, 2025

Club	Season	League			Cup (Note: Includes the NWSL Challenge Cup)		Playoffs (Note: Includes NWSL Playoffs)		Other		Total	
Club	Season	Division	Apps	Goals	Apps	Goals	Apps	Goals	Apps	Goals	Apps	Goals
Houston Dash	2022	NWSL	8	1	1	0	0	0	—		9	1
Houston Dash	2023	NWSL	18	1	3	0	—		—		21	1
Houston Dash	Total		26	2	4	0	0	0	0	0	30	2
Bay FC	2024	NWSL	17	3	—		0	0	3 (Note: Includes the NWSL x Liga MX Femenil Summer Cup)	0	20	3
Career total			43	5	4	0	0	0	3	0	50	5
