= Maddie Moreau =

American soccer player (born 2000)

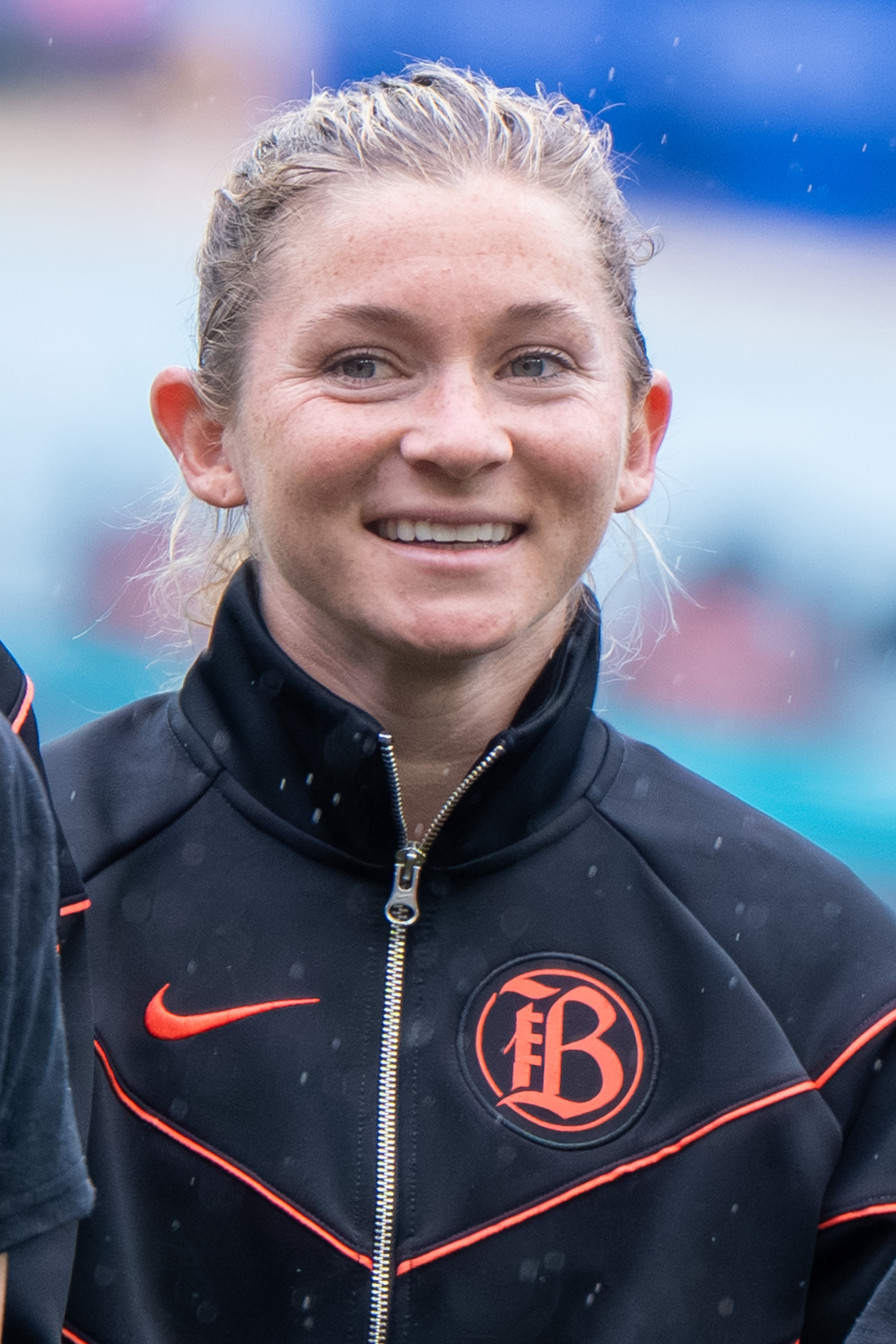
- Moreau with Bay FC in 2026

Personal information
- Full name: Madeleine Rose Moreau
- Date of birth: December 5, 2000 (age 25)
- Place of birth: Youngsville, Louisiana, U.S.
- Height: 5 ft 1 in (1.55 m)
- Position: Left back

Team information
- Current team: Bay FC
- Number: 24

Youth career
- Cajun Soccer Club

College career
Years	Team	Apps	(Gls)
2019–2021	LSU Tigers	56	(3)
2022–2023	West Virginia Mountaineers	41	(3)

Senior career*
Years	Team	Apps	(Gls)
2018–2021	Baton Rouge United		
2022–2023	Cajun Rush Soccer Club		
2024–	Bay FC	54	(0)
- * Club domestic league appearances and goals as of 05:03, November 2, 2026 (UTC)

Madeleine Rose Moreau (born December 5, 2000) is an American professional soccer player who plays as a left back for Bay FC of the National Women's Soccer League (NWSL). She played college soccer for the LSU Tigers and the West Virginia Mountaineers.

== Early life ==
Moreau was born in Youngsville, Louisiana, and attended St. Thomas More Catholic High School while also playing youth club soccer with Cajun Soccer Club. She won back to back state high school titles in soccer and basketball in 2018 and 2019, and in the latter season was named Louisiana Gatorade Player of the Year for her performance in soccer. She also earned a championship and All-State honors in track and field, part of a Louisiana state champion 4x400 meter relay team. Over her high school career Moreau was named All-State in each of her four seasons as well as district Most Valuable Player in three of four years.

== College career ==
=== LSU Tigers ===
Moreau attended Louisiana State University where she played as a midfielder for the LSU Tigers. In three seasons she had 56 appearances, scoring 3 goals and registering 5 assists. Moreau served as team captain in her sophomore and junior seasons. The Tigers had one of their best regular seasons ever in 2021, achieving a 6th overall ranking and defeating the most ranked opponents in a single season of program history. This season was also the sole one in which the Tigers reached the NCAA Division I tournament in Moreau's tenure, qualifying for the first round of the 2021 tournament, where they fell in a 3–0 loss to the Memphis Tigers.

=== West Virginia Mountaineers ===
Following the 2021 NCAA season in December, Moreau transferred to West Virginia University for their spring season ahead of her senior year in the fall. She featured as a midfielder and defender for the West Virginia Mountaineers. In her two seasons she played in 41 games, scoring 3 times and registering 2 assists. The Mountaineers won the 2022 Big 12 Tournament to clinch an automatic bid for the 2022 NCAA DI tournament. West Virginia would defeat Virginia Tech 2–0 in the first round, but would subsequently fall 4–0 to Penn State in the second round of the tournament. The following season the team would not be able to repeat their Big 12 Tournament victory and failed to qualify for NCAA Tournament in Moreau's final college season.

== Club career ==
=== Amateur clubs ===
Moreau was a member of Baton Rogue United's inaugural roster which got their start in the Women's Premier Soccer League for the 2018 season. She remained on the club's roster for the 2019 WPSL season, and did not play summer soccer upon the cancellation of the 2020 WPSL season due to the COVID-19 pandemic. She returned to the club in 2021 following their move to the Gulf Coast Premier League, which they became champions of at the end of their first season. She moved on to play with Cajun Rush, her academy club, in the 2022 and 2023 GCPL seasons.

=== Bay FC ===
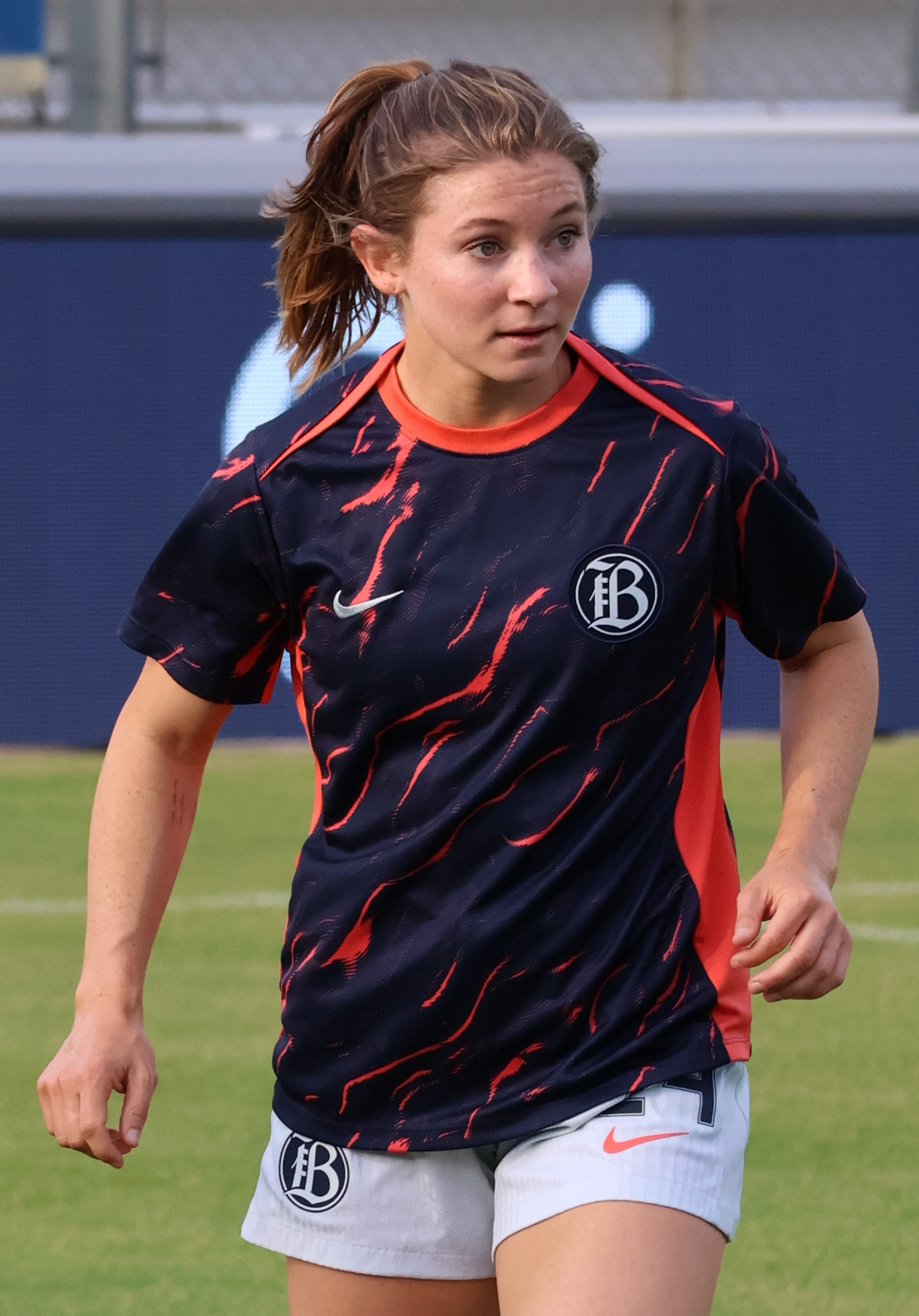
Moreau with Bay FC in 2025

Moreau was not selected during the 2024 NWSL Draft but was subsequently invited to join NWSL expansion side Bay FC's preseason roster. She officially signed a contract with Bay FC on March 15, 2024, inking a one-year deal with an option for 2025. Moreau made her professional debut on April 20, 2024, as a substitute in the 81st minute of a 5–2 loss away to the Kansas City Current. She became the first player from Louisiana to appear in the NWSL. She made her first NWSL start on May 1, 2024, in a 3–2 home loss to the Portland Thorns. During Bay FC's three-match run in the NWSL x Liga MX Femenil Summer Cup, Moreau earned a start in each match and scored her first two professional goals. She completed her rookie season with 15 appearances across all competitions.

== Career statistics ==
=== Club ===
As of May 6, 2025

Club	Season	League			Cup		Playoffs (Note: Includes NWSL Playoffs)		Other		Total	
Club	Season	Division	Apps	Goals	Apps	Goals	Apps	Goals	Apps	Goals	Apps	Goals
Bay FC	2024	NWSL	12	0	—		—		3 (Note: Appearances in the NWSL x Liga MX Femenil Summer Cup)	2	15	0
Bay FC	2025	NWSL	2	0	—		—		—		2	0
Career total			14	0	0	0	0	0	3	2	17	0
