= Alex Pfeiffer =

Alex Pfeiffer may refer to:

- Alex Pfeiffer (soccer) (born 2007), American soccer player
- Alex Pfeiffer (political advisor) (born 1996), American political advisor and principal deputy White House communications director from January to September 2025
