= Savy King =

American soccer player (born 2005)

Savannah King
- King with Angel City FC in 2026

Personal information
- Full name: Savannah Mckenzie King
- Date of birth: February 7, 2005 (age 21)
- Place of birth: Santa Monica, California, U.S.
- Height: 5 ft 6 in (1.68 m)
- Positions: Center back; left back

Team information
- Current team: Angel City FC
- Number: 3

College career
Years	Team	Apps	(Gls)
2023	North Carolina Tar Heels	23	(0)

Senior career*
Years	Team	Apps	(Gls)
2024	Bay FC	18	(0)
2025–	Angel City FC	25	(0)

International career^{‡}
2022	United States U17	14	(0)
2023–2024	United States U20	19	(0)
Medal record
Women's soccer
FIFA U-20 Women's World Cup
Bronze medal – third place	Colombia 2024
- * Club domestic league appearances and goals as of 06:01, November 12, 2026 (UTC) ‡ National team caps and goals as of September 21, 2024

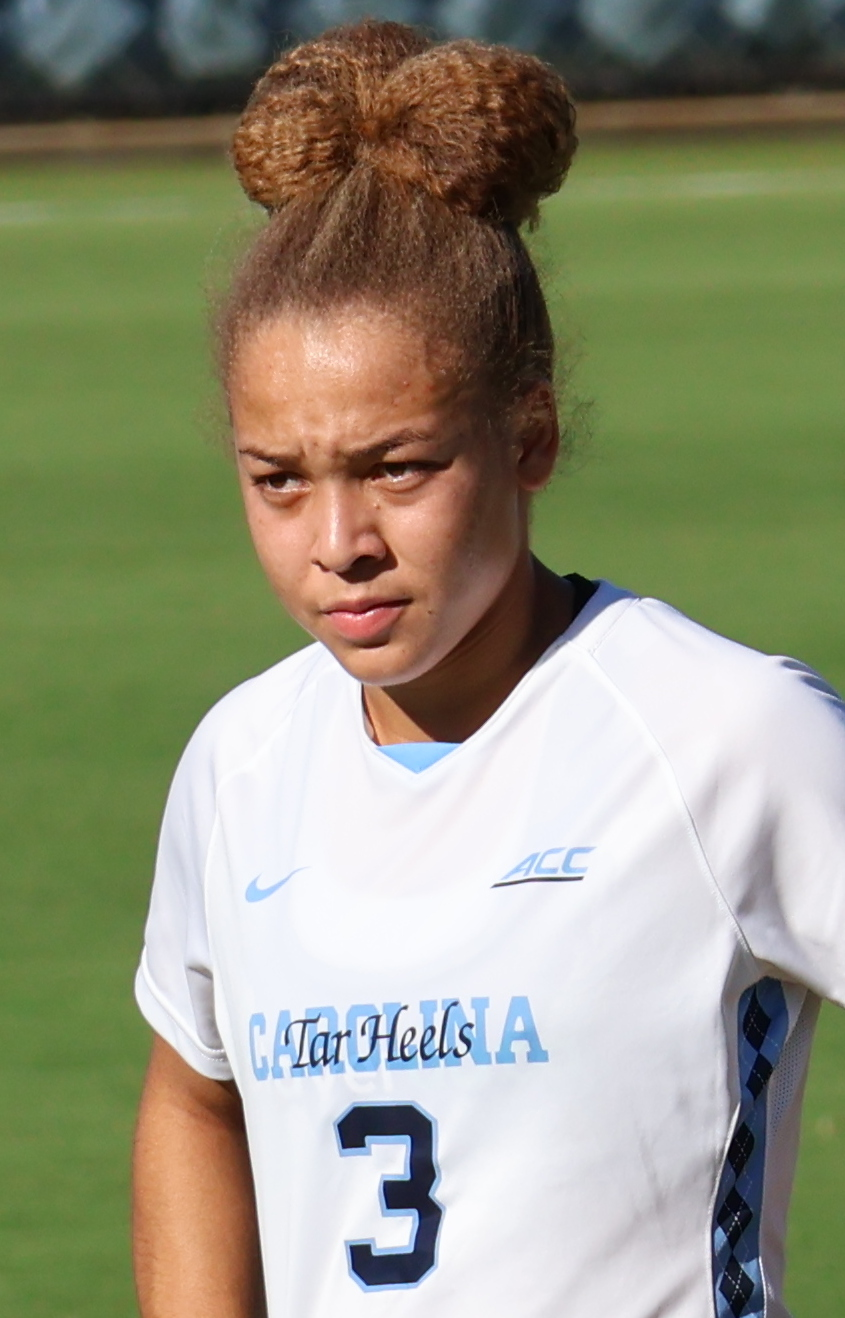
King with North Carolina in 2023

Savannah Mckenzie King (born February 7, 2005) is an American professional soccer player who plays as a defender for Angel City FC of the National Women's Soccer League (NWSL). She played one season of college soccer for the North Carolina Tar Heels before being drafted second overall by Bay FC in the 2024 NWSL Draft. She represented the United States at the under-17 and under-20 level, helping win bronze at the 2024 FIFA U-20 Women's World Cup.

== Early life and college career ==
King was born in Santa Monica, California, to Karrie King, a former professional cyclist and runner, and Kim Parker King. She grew up in West Hills with her twin brother, Parker. She played multiple sports in her youth, including softball, baseball, and flag football, only taking up soccer at age ten on an AYSO team. She later played club soccer for Real So Cal and then Slammers FC HB Køge, with which she won the ECNL under-18/19 national title in 2023.

King attended Agoura High School, where she lettered in four years of track and set school records in the 200-meter (25.49) and 400-meter dash (56.87). She also played flag football at Agoura and once recorded six interceptions and four touchdowns in a single game. Ranked by TopDrawerSoccer as the top left back of the class of 2023, she committed to the University of North Carolina at Chapel Hill in November 2022. She entered into a name, image, and likeness (NIL) agreement with Nike before starting college.

=== North Carolina Tar Heels ===
King spent one season as a starting center back for North Carolina in 2023, starting all 23 games. Head coach Anson Dorrance called her performance in the team's scoreless season opener at Penn State the "best first-game performance by a freshman" in program history. In the first three weeks of the season, she was twice named Atlantic Coast Conference (ACC) Defensive Player of the Week as North Carolina conceded only two goals in its first six games. She led the team in minutes played in her freshman season, which ended in the quarterfinals of the NCAA tournament, and was named to the ACC all-freshman team and the All-ACC second team.

== Club career ==
Savy King with Angel City FC in 2026

=== Bay FC ===
Bay FC, a new NWSL expansion team, selected King second overall in the 2024 NWSL Draft; she and North Carolina teammate Ally Sentnor were the top two picks. She was signed to a three-year contract. She made her professional debut on March 17, starting at left back in Bay's first-ever game, a 1–0 win against Angel City FC. She held a regular starting position before missing about a month while at the 2024 FIFA U-20 Women's World Cup, an absence during and after which Alyssa Malonson filled the starting left back spot. She finished her rookie season with 2 assists in 18 appearances (12 starts).

=== Angel City FC ===
On February 3, 2025, King was traded to her hometown team Angel City FC, reportedly at her request, in exchange for $200,000 in immediate intra-league transfer funds and an additional $100,000 in 2026. Angel City signed a two-year extension with King before the season began, keeping her under contract until 2028. King returned to center back in her club debut, starting in the season opener on March 16, a 1–1 draw against the San Diego Wave.

On May 9, 2025, during Angel City FC's NWSL match against the Utah Royals, King collapsed on the field in the 74th minute due to a medical event. Medical personnel appeared to administer chest compressions on the field before she was removed on a cart, equipped with an oxygen mask, and transported by emergency medical services to a hospital. The game was delayed for approximately 10 minutes. Angel City FC subsequently announced that King was responsive, with her family, and undergoing further evaluation in the hospital. On May 13, the club announced that King had successfully undergone surgery to address a heart abnormality discovered during treatment.

King made her return to play on March 15, 2026, in Angel City's opening game of the 2026 season, coming on in the 63rd minute of a 4–0 victory over Chicago Stars FC.

== International career ==
King was invited to United States national under-15 team training camps in 2019 and 2020. In 2022, she helped the national under-17 team win the 2022 CONCACAF Women's U-17 Championship to qualify for the 2022 FIFA U-17 Women's World Cup, where she helped the United States advance out of the group stage, though they lost in the first knockout round on penalties. The next year, she was called up to the national under-20 team for the 2023 CONCACAF Women's U-20 Championship, where as co-captain she helped the United States qualify for the 2024 FIFA U-20 Women's World Cup. She played almost every minute of the U-20 Women's World Cup, helping the United States finish in third place, its best result since 2012.

King was called up by Emma Hayes into Futures Camp, practicing alongside the senior national team, in January 2025. She was a training player for the national team at the 2025 SheBelieves Cup the following month.

== Career statistics ==
=== Club ===
As of May 9, 2025

Club	Season	League			Cup		Playoffs (Note: Includes NWSL Playoffs)		Other		Total	
Club	Season	Division	Apps	Goals	Apps	Goals	Apps	Goals	Apps	Goals	Apps	Goals
Bay FC	2024	NWSL	18	0	—		—		2 (Note: Includes NWSL x Liga MX Femenil Summer Cup)	0	20	0
Angel City FC	2025	NWSL	8	0	—		—		—		8	0
Career total			26	0	0	0	0	0	2	0	28	0

== Honors and awards ==
United States U-17

- CONCACAF Women's U-17 Championship: 2022

United States U-20

- CONCACAF Women's U-20 Championship: 2023
- FIFA U-20 Women's World Cup bronze medal: 2024

Individual

- Second-team All-ACC: 2023
- ACC all-freshman team: 2023
