= Emmie Allen =

American soccer player (born 2002)

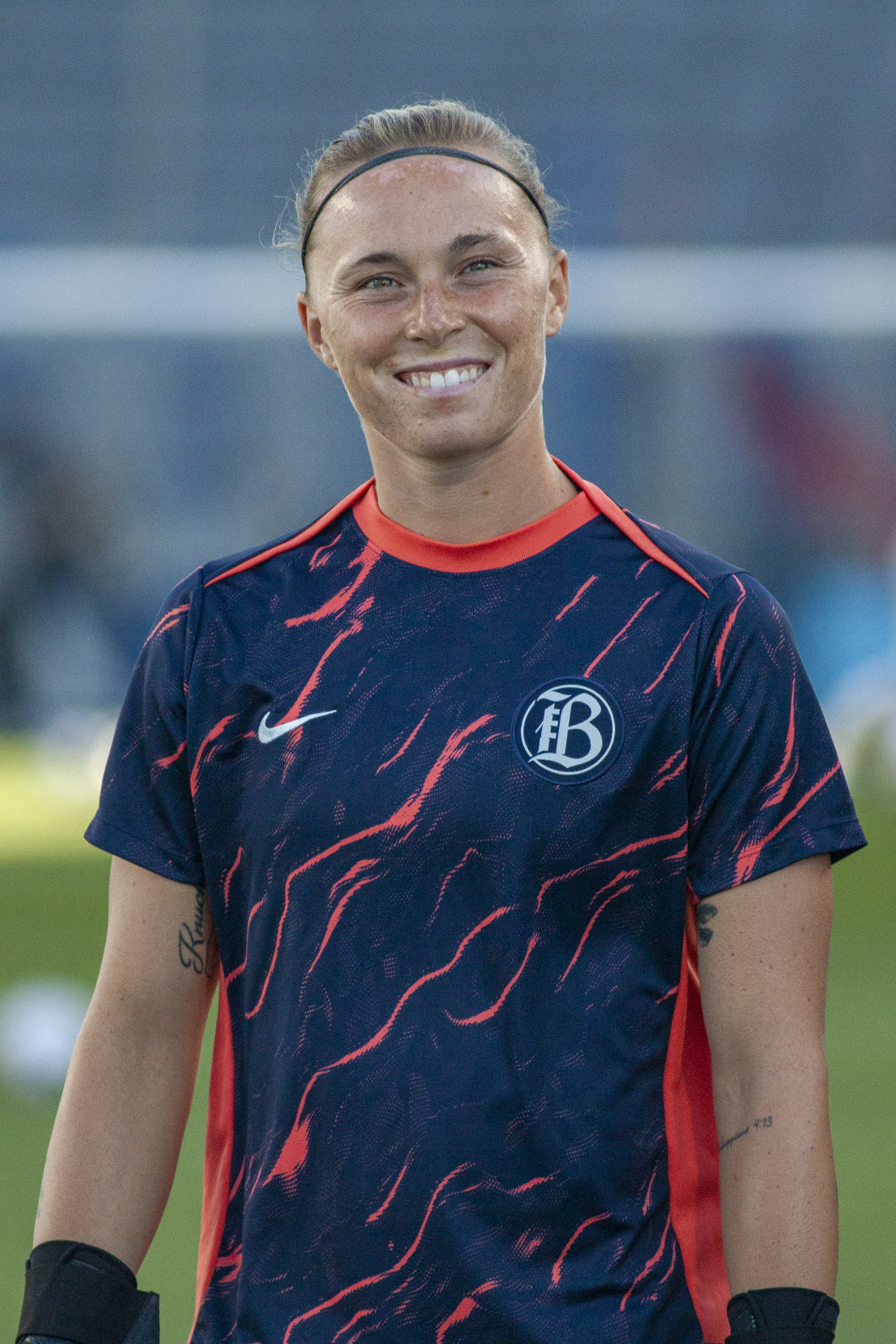
- Allen with Bay FC in 2025

Personal information
- Full name: Emmie Elizabeth Allen
- Date of birth: October 25, 2002 (age 24)
- Height: 5 ft 11 in (1.80 m)
- Position: Goalkeeper

Team information
- Current team: Bay FC
- Number: 32

College career
Years	Team	Apps	(Gls)
2021–2023	North Carolina Tar Heels	47	(0)

Senior career*
Years	Team	Apps	(Gls)
2022–2023	North Carolina Courage U23	20	(0)
2024–	Bay FC	4	(0)
- * Club domestic league appearances and goals as of 04:59, November 2, 2026 (UTC)

Emmie Elizabeth Allen (born October 25, 2002) is an American professional soccer player who plays as a goalkeeper for Bay FC of the National Women's Soccer League (NWSL). She played two seasons of college soccer for the North Carolina Tar Heels.

== Early life ==
Allen grew up in High Point, North Carolina, the younger of two children born to Laura and Scott Allen. She began playing soccer at a young age. She came from a family of University of North Carolina graduates and attended soccer camps there while in middle school. She played soccer and basketball for High Point Christian Academy in eighth grade. She began online schooling the next year while playing club soccer for the North Carolina Courage Academy. She committed to North Carolina while in ninth grade.

== College career ==
After redshirting her freshman year behind Claudia Dickey, Allen became the starting goalkeeper for the North Carolina Tar Heels at the start of the 2022 season. She alternated playing halves for six games before becoming the full-time starter. In the ACC tournament, she saved two penalty kicks in the shootout against Duke to advance to the final. In the NCAA tournament, she posted six saves in a 2–0 win against Notre Dame in the quarterfinals and made a career-high nine saves in a 3–2 win against Florida State in the semifinals. In the 2022 national title game, she recorded eight saves against UCLA, and her team led by a goal with seconds remaining when Allen was shoved to the ground during a corner kick, and the Bruins scored. No foul was called, and North Carolina lost in overtime. She finished the 2022 season with 8 clean sheets in 26 games.

After recovering from a knee injury in the spring, Allen played for the North Carolina Courage U23 in the summertime USL W League, helping the team to the national final. In the 2023 season, the redshirt sophomore kept 8 shutouts in 21 games, including two in the NCAA tournament. She tied her career high with nine saves in a 4–3 loss to BYU in the quarterfinals. After the season, she declared for the 2024 NWSL Draft.

== Club career ==
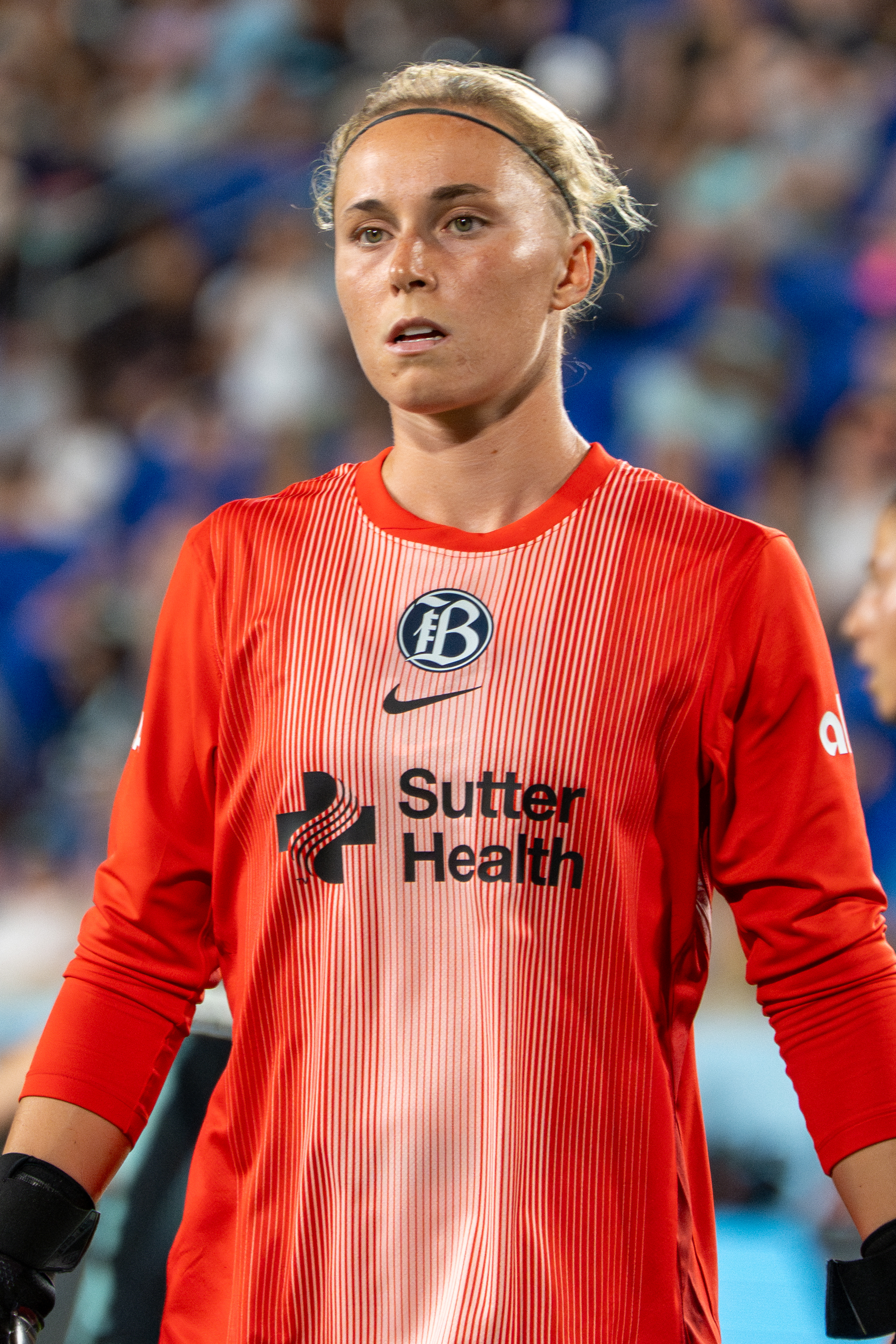
Allen with Bay FC in 2025

After going undrafted in the 2024 NWSL Draft, Allen was invited to train with Bay FC in the preseason. On March 13, 2024, she was signed to a one-year contract with a one-year option, becoming Bay's third option in goal behind Lysianne Proulx and Katelyn Rowland. She made her professional debut on July 20, starting in a 3–1 defeat to the San Diego Wave in the NWSL x Liga MX Femenil Summer Cup. On August 27, she played the second half of Bay's exhibition game against Barcelona. After the 2024 season, she signed a new one-year contract with an option for an additional year.

Midseason acquisition Jordan Silkowitz won the starting job after Rowland retired during the 2025 preseason. On June 13, 2025, with Silkowitz ill, Allen made her NWSL regular-season debut against the Orlando Pride, conceding only after an unlucky deflection in a 1–0 loss. On July 1, Bay announced that Allen had been signed to a new contract through the 2027 season with a mutual option for another year.

== International career ==
Allen was called into training with the United States under-23 team in June 2025 at a camp held concurrently with the senior national team.
