= Catherine Paulson =

American soccer player (born 2001)

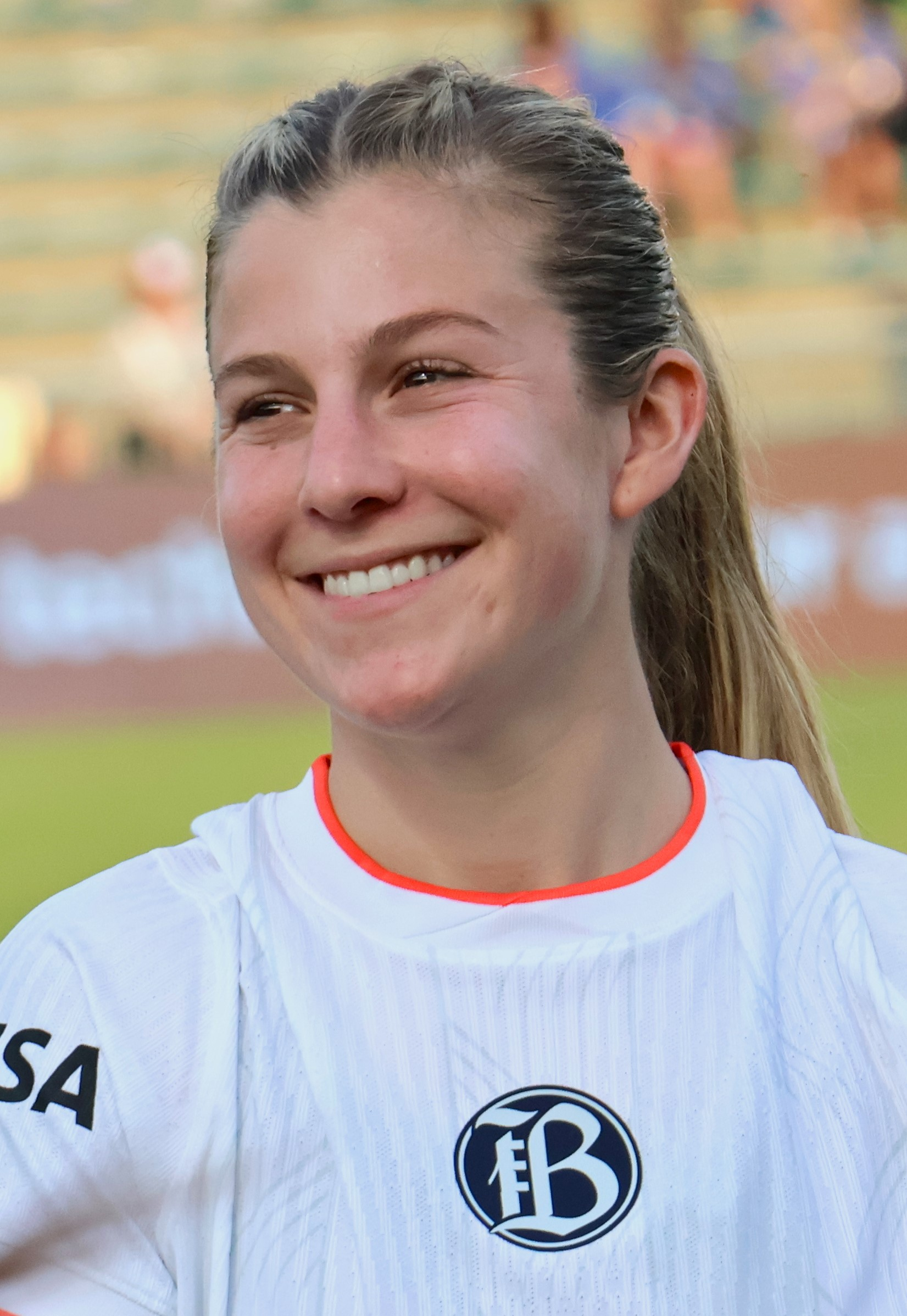
- Paulson with Bay FC in 2025

Personal information
- Full name: Catherine Pauline Paulson
- Date of birth: November 5, 2001 (age 24)
- Place of birth: Mountain View, California, United States
- Height: 5 ft 7 in (1.70 m)
- Positions: Midfielder; forward

Team information
- Current team: HB Køge
- Number: 13

Youth career
- 2010–2020: MVLA

College career
Years	Team	Apps	(Gls)
2020–2023	Stanford Cardinal	47	(4)

Senior career*
Years	Team	Apps	(Gls)
2024–2025	Bay FC	6	(0)
2026–	HB Køge	2	(0)
- * Club domestic league appearances and goals as of March 28, 2026

Catherine Pauline Paulson (born November 5, 2001) is an American professional soccer player who plays as a midfielder for Danish A-Liga club HB Køge. She played college soccer for the Stanford Cardinal. She also played for Bay FC in the National Women's Soccer League (NWSL).

== Early life ==
Paulson was born in Mountain View and raised in Los Altos, California. She played basketball and danced in addition to playing soccer growing up. She joined MVLA Soccer Club when she was eight. She played two seasons of soccer at Saint Francis High School. She and her twin sister committed to play college soccer at Stanford when they were sophomores.

== College career ==
Paulson's freshman season with the Stanford Cardinal was disrupted by the COVID-19 pandemic. She scored one goal in the 12 games she played, starting 6, in the spring of 2021. She missed her entire sophomore season due to injury. In her redshirt sophomore season in 2022, she helped the Cardinal win the Pac-12 Conference, scoring 3 goals in 21 substitute appearances. She started the first 2 games and made 14 appearances in 2023. Stanford went undefeated all the way to the final of the NCAA tournament, losing to Florida State. She graduated in the spring of 2024, receiving her bachelor's degree in science, technology, and society.

== Club career ==
=== Bay FC ===
After graduating from college, Paulson was invited to train with National Women's Soccer League (NWSL) expansion team Bay FC by head coach Albertin Montoya, who previously directed her youth club MVLA. On August 27, 2024, Bay announced she had signed her first professional contract with the club on a national team replacement deal as Savy King played at the 2024 FIFA U-20 Women's World Cup. She made her professional debut the same day in the club's friendly against Barcelona at PayPal Park. On October 11, she signed a second contract with Bay for the remainder of the season.

Paulson returned to Bay as a preseason non-roster invitee in January 2025. On March 10, she signed a short-term contract through June. When it expired, she was re-signed until the end of the season. On August 10, she made her NWSL debut as a late substitute for Penelope Hocking in a 1–1 draw against the Chicago Stars. She made her first professional start in her sixth NWSL appearance in a 4–1 loss to the North Carolina Courage on October 17.

=== HB Køge ===
Danish club HB Køge announced the signing of Paulson on March 19, 2026. She debuted for the club two days later in a 0–0 draw with Brøndby in the league. On April 2, she scored her first professional goal against the same opposition, capitalizing on Brøndby's error in the 2nd minute of the Danish Women's Cup semifinals second leg, to help HB Køge reach their first cup final.

== Personal life ==
Paulson is the daughter of Jen and Greg Paulson. She has three siblings including a twin sister, Sarah, who played with her at Stanford. Three generations of her family played college sports at Santa Clara University.

== Honors and awards ==
Stanford Cardinal

- Pac-12 Conference: 2022

HB Køge

- A-Liga: 2025–26
- Danish Women's Cup: 2025–26
