= Melissa Lowder =

American soccer player

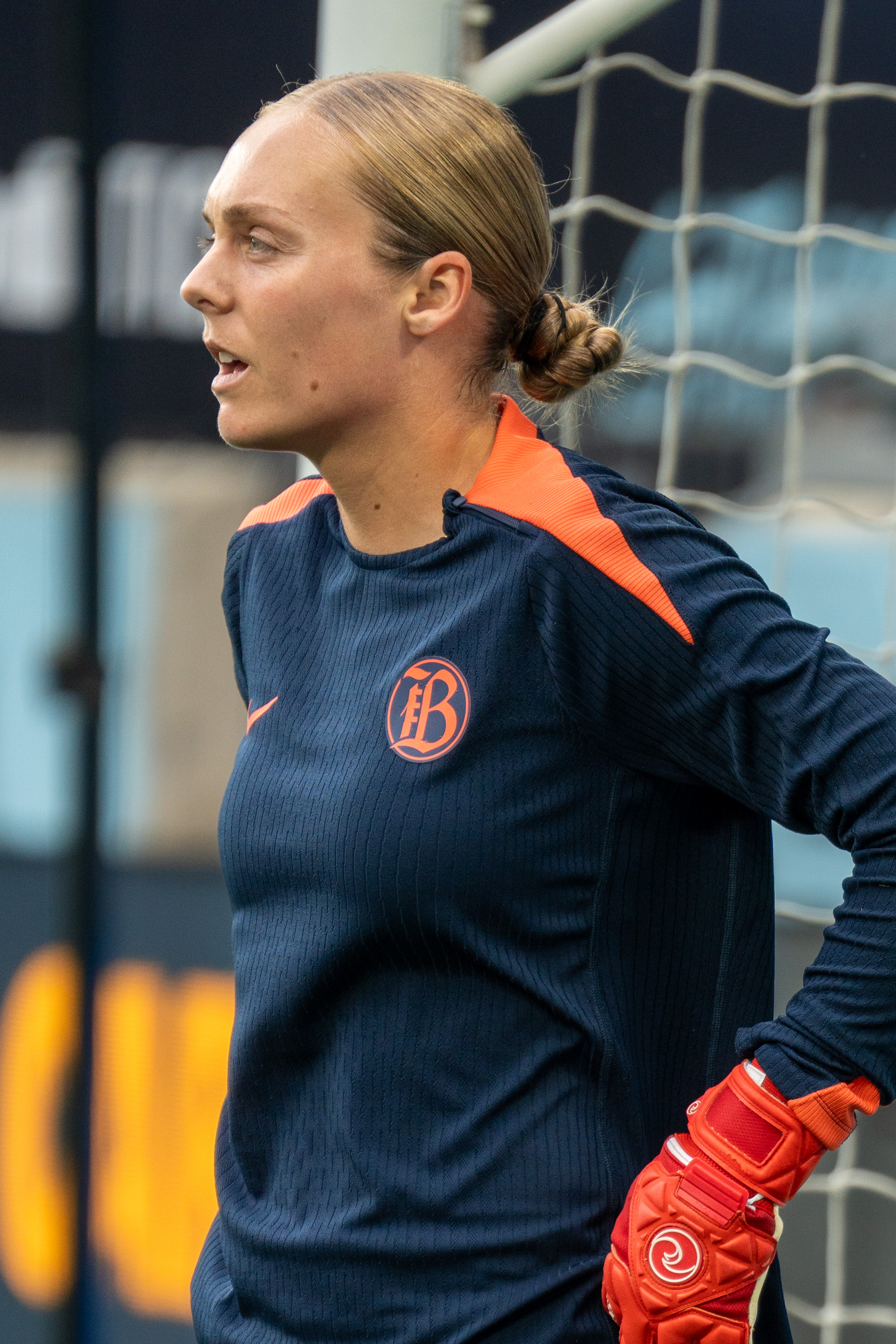
- Lowder with Bay FC in 2025

Personal information
- Full name: Melissa Anne Lowder
- Date of birth: January 29, 1997 (age 29)
- Place of birth: San Diego, California, U.S.
- Height: 5 ft 8 in (1.73 m)
- Position: Goalkeeper

College career
| Years | Team | Apps | (Gls) |
| 2015–2018 | Santa Clara Broncos | 63 | (0) |

Senior career*
| Years | Team | Apps | (Gls) |
| 2019–2020 | Utah Royals | 0 | (0) |
| 2021 | Chicago Red Stars | 0 | (0) |
| 2021–2022 | Beach Soccer LA | 10 | (1) |
| 2022 | San Diego Wave | 0 | (0) |
| 2023 | Þór/KA | 21 | (0) |
| 2024–2025 | Bay FC | 0 | (0) |

International career
| 2019– | United States (beach soccer) | 9 | (0) |
- * Club domestic league appearances and goals

Melissa Anne Lowder (born January 29, 1997) is an American professional soccer player who plays as a goalkeeper. She played college soccer for the Santa Clara Broncos. She was previously a member of the Utah Royals, Chicago Red Stars, San Diego Wave, and Bay FC in the NWSL.

== Club career ==
=== Utah Royals ===
Lowder was signed on a temporary basis by the Utah Royals on May 28, 2019, as a National Team Replacement player, serving as a backup goalkeeper. She was promoted to the team's Supplemental Roster on July 24, 2019. The club option for Lowder's NWSL contract was exercised ahead of the 2020 National Women's Soccer League season. Lowder earned her first start on September 26, 2020, during the 2020 NWSL Fall Series. In her professional debut she helped Utah earn a 2–2 draw with OL Reign. She was not given a new contract by Utah following the 2020 season.

=== Chicago Red Stars ===
Subsequently, Lowder was brought in to the Chicago Red Stars during the 2021 preseason, earning a spot as a National Team Replacement Player prior to the start of the campaign.

=== San Diego Wave ===
In 2022, Lowder appeared on the preseason roster of the San Diego Wave and was eventually signed ahead of the club's inaugural season. She did not make any appearances before her contract expired at the end of the year.

=== Þór/KA ===
Following her departure from San Diego, Lowder moved abroad for the first time in her career, joining Þór/KA in Iceland's ahead of the 2023 Besta deild kvenna season. This was her first time in her professional career playing as a starter, and she made 21 appearances throughout the 2023 season.

=== Bay FC ===
Lowder returned to the NWSL and signed with expansion side Bay FC on January 29, 2024, joining the preseason roster. It was announced on March 11, 2024, that Lowder suffered a season ending anterior cruciate ligament injury, less than a week before Bay FC's inaugural NWSL regular season match away to Angel City FC. It was reported previous to her injury that Lowder was seen as Bay's starting goalkeeper heading into the 2024 NWSL season.
