= Alyssa Malonson =

American soccer player (born 1999)

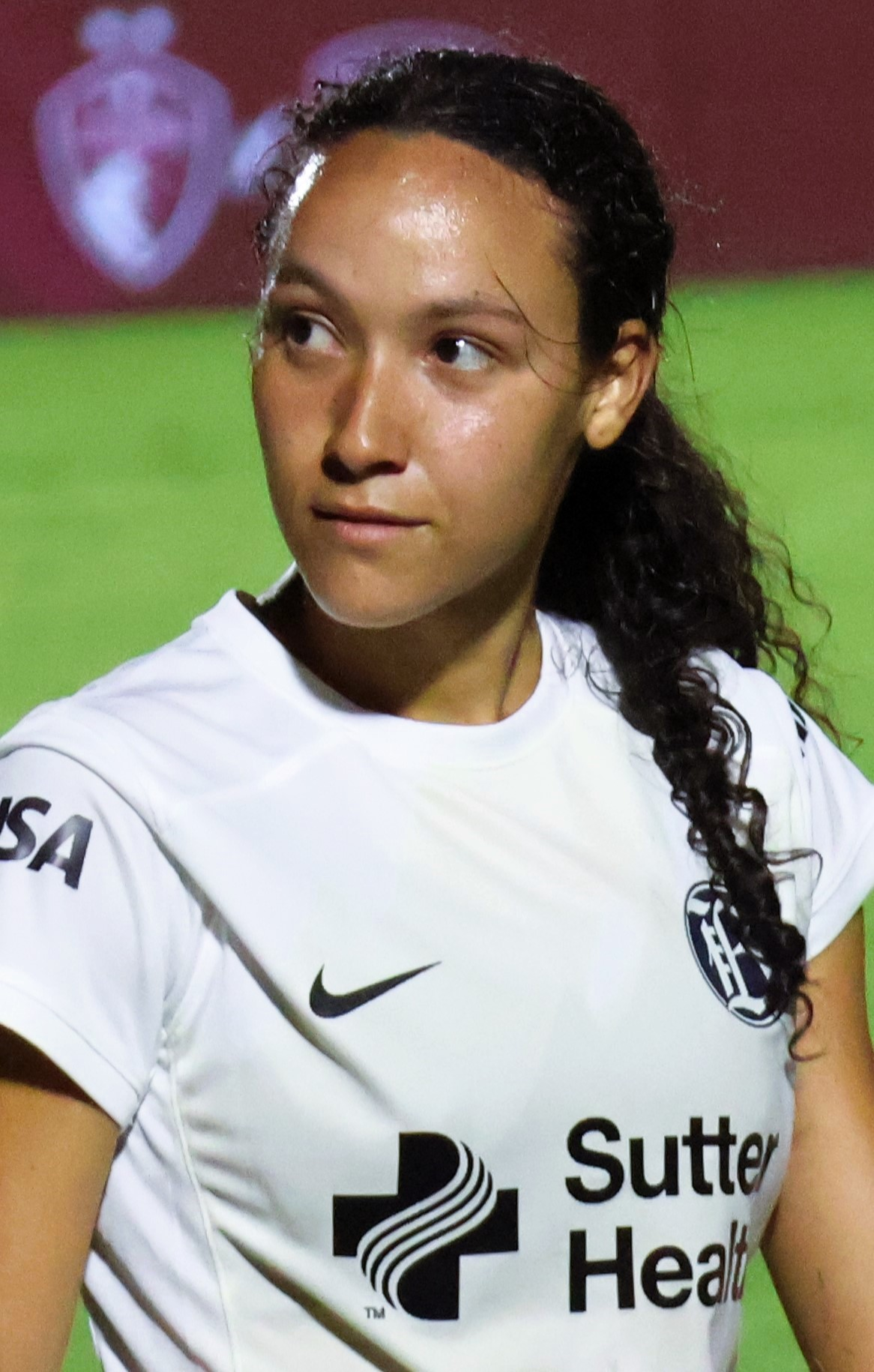
- Malonson with Bay FC in 2024

Personal information
- Full name: Alyssa Michelle Malonson
- Date of birth: April 9, 1999 (age 27)
- Place of birth: Spring, Texas, U.S.
- Height: 5 ft 4 in (1.63 m)
- Position: Left back

Team information
- Current team: Bay FC
- Number: 20

College career
Years	Team	Apps	(Gls)
2017–2021	Auburn Tigers	97	(4)

Senior career*
Years	Team	Apps	(Gls)
2022–2023	OL Reign	4	(0)
2022	→ FC Nordsjælland (loan)	13	(0)
2024–	Bay FC	48	(1)

International career^{‡}
2019	United States U23		
2024–	United States	1	(0)
- * Club domestic league appearances and goals as of November 3, 2025 ‡ National team caps and goals as of October 30, 2024

Alyssa Michelle Malonson (born April 9, 1999) is an American professional soccer player who plays as a left back for Bay FC of the National Women's Soccer League (NWSL). She played college soccer for the Auburn Tigers. She has previously played for the OL Reign and Danish club FC Nordsjælland.

== Early life and college career ==
Malonson grew up in the Houston suburb of Spring, Texas. She played youth soccer as a winger for Challenge Soccer Club in Texas.

=== Auburn Tigers ===
Malonson played for the Auburn Tigers from 2017 to 2021. She left as the program's record holder for games played, games started and consecutive games started. In her fifth and final collegiate season, Malonson was named the Southeastern Conference Defender of the Year and second-team All-American.

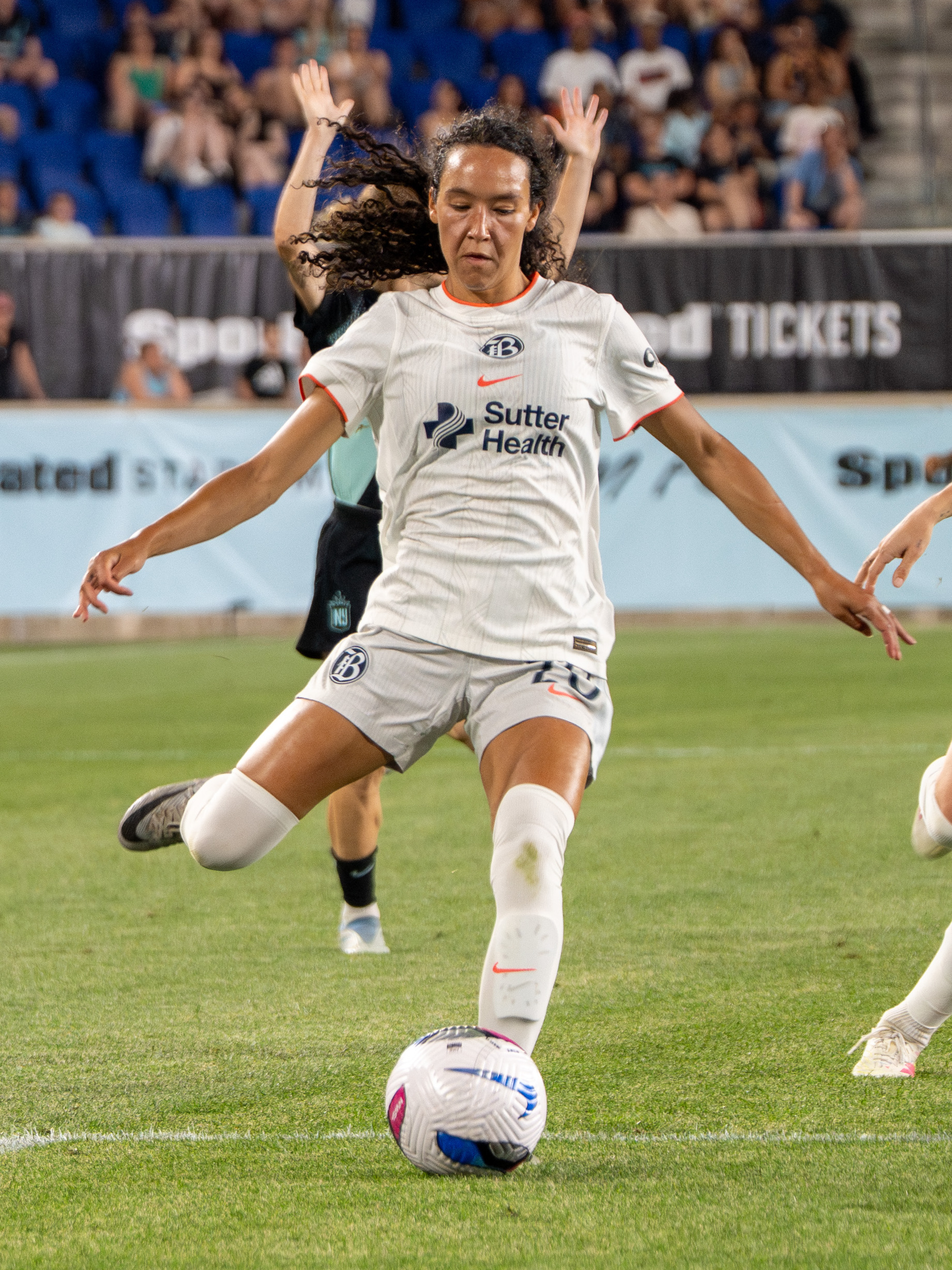
Malonson with Bay FC in 2025

== Club career ==
=== OL Reign ===
Malonson was drafted by the North Carolina Courage 20th overall in the 2021 NWSL Draft; however, due to the COVID-19 pandemic, she opted to play a fifth collegiate season instead. OL Reign acquired her rights and subsequently signed her at the start of 2022.

Following a successful loan in Denmark, Malonson returned to the Reign and made her NWSL debut in a Challenge Cup game against Angel City on April 19, 2023.

==== FC Nordsjælland (loan) ====
In July 2022, having not seen action on the pitch, Malonson was loaned to Danish club FC Nordsjælland for the rest of the year. She made 13 appearances for Nordsjælland, which would finish the season fourth in the Kvindeligaen.

=== Bay FC ===
On December 15, 2023, Malonson was selected as the first pick in the 2024 NWSL expansion draft by expansion club Bay FC. She made her Bay FC debut in the club's inaugural match, a 1–0 victory over Angel City FC on March 17, 2024. Malonson competed for minutes at left back with teammate Savy King throughout the season and ended up making 22 regular season appearances in her first year with Bay FC. Malonson scored her first professional goal on June 7, 2025, as she netted in the first half of Bay FC's 1–0 win against Portland Thorns FC. On March 9, 2026, she was placed on the Season-Ending Injury list, having sustained an ACL tear during preseason training.

== International career ==
Malonson was a youth international at the under-15 and under-23 level. She received her first senior national team call-up in October 2024 for the team's Olympic gold medal victory tour.

== Career statistics ==
=== International ===
As of match played October 30, 2024

National Team	Year	Apps	Goals
United States	2024	1	0
Total		1	0
