= 2024 NWSL x Liga MX Femenil Summer Cup =

Soccer tournament held in Mexico and United States

Tournament details
- Host countries: United States; Mexico
- Dates: July 19 – October 25
- Teams: 20 (from 2 associations)

Final positions
- Champions: (United States) Kansas City Current (1st title)
- Runners-up: (United States) NJ/NY Gotham FC

Tournament statistics
- Matches played: 33
- Goals scored: 96 (2.91 per match)

The 2024 NWSL x Liga MX Femenil Summer Cup was a women's soccer competition between clubs from the National Women's Soccer League (NWSL) of the United States and Liga MX Femenil of Mexico. The competition was similar to the Leagues Cup, which is played by men's teams from Major League Soccer and Liga MX. Although branded as the "first edition", the Summer Cup did not return in 2025.

The tournament was held from July to October, primarily during the 2024 Summer Olympics, at venues in the United States and Mexico. The 20 participating teams were divided into five groups, with the top four teams overall advancing to the semifinals. The final was hosted at Toyota Field in San Antonio, Texas, and won by the Kansas City Current, who defeated NJ/NY Gotham FC 2–0.

== Format ==
The tournament had 20 teams: all 14 teams in the NWSL and 6 participants from Liga MX Femenil, determined through a qualification process. The teams were divided into five groups, each with four participants, and each played three matches in the group stage beginning on July 19. The four group winners with the most points advanced to the semifinals at CPKC Stadium in Kansas City, Missouri, on August 6, with their ranking used for seeding; one group winner would not advance. The championship match was held October 25 at Toyota Field in San Antonio, Texas.

If a match was tied after 90 minutes, it immediately proceeded into a penalty shootout. Three points were awarded for a win in regulation time, two points for a win via a penalty shootout, one point for a loss in the penalty shootout, and no points for a regulation-time loss. The group stage tiebreakers were goal difference, followed by total goals scored, points in head-to-head matches, goal difference in head-to-head matches, goals scored in head-to-head matches, and least disciplinary points.

Nearly all games during the group stage were played in the United States, with the exception of Tigres–Pachuca at Estadio Universitario in Monterrey. Several matches were played at non-NWSL venues, including City Stadium in Richmond, Virginia; and Subaru Park in Chester, Pennsylvania.

== Teams ==
20 team participated in the 2024 Summer Cup, which included all 14 teams from the NWSL and six teams from Liga MX Femenil that were determined by the most points accumulated across the Clausura 2023 and Apertura 2023 seasons.

Teams participating in the 2024 Summer Cup
League	Team	Qualification method
(Mexico) Liga MX Femenil (6 teams)	Tigres UANL	Accumulated the most points (82 pts) across the Clausura and Apertura tournaments of 2023
(Mexico) Liga MX Femenil (6 teams)	Club América	Accumulated the second most points (79 pts) across the Clausura and Apertura tournaments of 2023
(Mexico) Liga MX Femenil (6 teams)	C.D. Guadalajara	Accumulated the second most points (79 pts) across the Clausura and Apertura tournaments of 2023
(Mexico) Liga MX Femenil (6 teams)	C.F. Monterrey	Accumulated the fourth most points (77 pts) across the Clausura and Apertura tournaments of 2023
(Mexico) Liga MX Femenil (6 teams)	C.F. Pachuca	Accumulated the fifth most points (63 pts) across the Clausura and Apertura tournaments of 2023
(Mexico) Liga MX Femenil (6 teams)	Club Tijuana	Accumulated the sixth most points (60 pts) across the Clausura and Apertura tournaments of 2023
(United States) National Women's Soccer League (14 teams)	Angel City FC	Automatic qualification
(United States) National Women's Soccer League (14 teams)	Bay FC	Automatic qualification
(United States) National Women's Soccer League (14 teams)	Chicago Red Stars	Automatic qualification
(United States) National Women's Soccer League (14 teams)	Houston Dash	Automatic qualification
(United States) National Women's Soccer League (14 teams)	Kansas City Current	Automatic qualification
(United States) National Women's Soccer League (14 teams)	NJ/NY Gotham FC	Automatic qualification
(United States) National Women's Soccer League (14 teams)	North Carolina Courage	Automatic qualification
(United States) National Women's Soccer League (14 teams)	Orlando Pride	Automatic qualification
(United States) National Women's Soccer League (14 teams)	Portland Thorns FC	Automatic qualification
(United States) National Women's Soccer League (14 teams)	Racing Louisville FC	Automatic qualification
(United States) National Women's Soccer League (14 teams)	San Diego Wave FC	Automatic qualification
(United States) National Women's Soccer League (14 teams)	Seattle Reign FC	Automatic qualification
(United States) National Women's Soccer League (14 teams)	Utah Royals	Automatic qualification
(United States) National Women's Soccer League (14 teams)	Washington Spirit	Automatic qualification

Source: Liga MX Femenil

== Group stage ==
Group A
Group B
Group C

Pos	Team	Pld	Pts
1	(United States Soccer Federation) Utah Royals	3	6
2	(United States Soccer Federation) Portland Thorns FC	3	6
3	(United States Soccer Federation) Seattle Reign FC	3	3
4	(Mexican Football Federation) Tijuana	3	3

Source: NWSL

Pos	Team	Pld	Pts
1	(United States Soccer Federation) Angel City FC	3	8
2	(United States Soccer Federation) San Diego Wave FC	3	4
3	(Mexican Football Federation) Club América	3	3
4	(United States Soccer Federation) Bay FC	3	3

Source: NWSL

Pos	Team	Pld	Pts
1	(United States Soccer Federation) Kansas City Current	3	9
2	(United States Soccer Federation) Houston Dash	3	6
3	(Mexican Football Federation) Tigres UANL	3	3
4	(Mexican Football Federation) Pachuca	3	0

Source: NWSL
Group D
Group E

Pos	Team	Pld	Pts
1	(United States Soccer Federation) NJ/NY Gotham FC	3	8
2	(United States Soccer Federation) Chicago Red Stars	3	4
3	(United States Soccer Federation) Washington Spirit	3	3
4	(Mexican Football Federation) Guadalajara	3	3

Source: NWSL

Pos	Team	Pld	Pts
1	(United States Soccer Federation) North Carolina Courage	3	7
2	(United States Soccer Federation) Racing Louisville FC	3	6
3	(United States Soccer Federation) Orlando Pride	3	4
4	(Mexican Football Federation) Monterrey	3	1

Source: NWSL

=== Ranking of group winners ===
Pos	Team	Pld	Pts
1	(United States Soccer Federation) Kansas City Current	3	9
2	(United States Soccer Federation) NJ/NY Gotham FC	3	8
3	(United States Soccer Federation) Angel City FC	3	8
4	(United States Soccer Federation) North Carolina Courage	3	7
5	(United States Soccer Federation) Utah Royals	3	6

Source: NWSL

== Knockout stage ==
=== Bracket ===
The tournament bracket is shown below, with bold denoting the winners of each match.

Semifinals
August 6 – Kansas City
**(United States) NJ/NY Gotham FC**	**1**
(United States) Angel City FC	0
August 6 – Kansas City
**(United States) Kansas City Current**	**2**
(United States) North Carolina Courage	0

Final
October 25 – San Antonio
(United States) NJ/NY Gotham FC	0
**(United States) Kansas City Current**	**2**

=== Semifinals ===
August 6
17:00 ET

NJ/NY Gotham FC (United States)	1–0	(United States) Angel City FC
Sheehan 48'	Report

CPKC Stadium, Kansas City, Missouri
Referee: Elijio Arreguin

August 6
21:00 ET

Kansas City Current (United States)	2–0	(United States) North Carolina Courage
Chawinga 2'; Debinha 78'	Report

CPKC Stadium, Kansas City, Missouri
Referee: Katja Koroleva

=== Final ===
October 25
19:30 ET

NJ/NY Gotham FC (United States)	0–2	(United States) Kansas City Current
	Report	Chawinga 24', 37'

Toyota Field, San Antonio, Texas
Attendance: 3,668
Referee: Alyssa Nichols

== Goalscorers ==
There were 96 goals scored in 33 matches, for an average of 2.91 goals per match.

4 goals

- (Brazil) Debinha, KC
- (Guatemala) Aisha Solórzano, TJ

3 goals

- (Malawi) Temwa Chawinga, KC

2 goals

- (United States) Hannah Betfort, UT
- (United States) Ally Sentnor, UT
- (United States) Brecken Mozingo, UT
- (United States) Maddie Moreau, Bay
- (Mexico) Kiana Palacios, América
- (Mexico) Cristina Ferral, Tigres UANL
- (South Africa) Thembi Kgatlana, Tigres UANL
- (United States) Lo'eau LaBonta , KC
- (United States) Kristen Hamilton, KC
- (Mexico) Diana Ordóñez, HOU
- (United States) Lena Silano, WAS
- (United States) Katie Stengel, NJ/NY
