= 2026 Bay FC season =

Bay FC's 2026 National Women's Soccer League season

Bay FC
2026 season
- Majority Owner: Sixth Street Partners
- President: Bernard Gutmann
- Head Coach: Emma Coates
- Stadium: PayPal Park
- NWSL: 14th
- NWSL Playoffs: DNQ
- Top goalscorer: Karlie Lema (8)
- Highest home attendance: 15,927 (Nov 1 vs SD)
- Lowest home attendance: 10,237 (Apr 5 vs WAS)
- Average home league attendance: 12,126
- Biggest win: 3–0 (vs NC (H), NWSL, Jul 18)
- Biggest defeat: 1–5 (vs KC (A), NWSL, Oct 3)
Home colors	Away colors	Third colors
- All statistics correct as of November 1, 2026.

The 2026 season is Bay FC's third season as a professional women's soccer team. The club is playing in the National Women's Soccer League (NWSL), the top tier of soccer in the United States. Bay FC play their home games at PayPal Park in San Jose, California.

== Background ==
On February 11, 2026, Claire Hutton was traded to Bay FC in exchange for US$1.1 million in transfer funds. This move and Croix Bethune's move from Washington to Kansas City were the second and third largest transfers in NWSL history.

== Squad ==
As of August 10, 2026.

No.	Pos.	Nation	Player
1	GK	USA	Camryn Miller
2	DF	USA	Heather Gilchrist
3	DF	USA	Caprice Dydasco (ML)
4	DF	USA	Emily Menges (ML)
5	FW	USA	Karlie Lema
6	FW	USA	Onyeka Gamero
7	MF	USA	Taylor Huff
8	MF	USA	Claire Hutton
9	FW	ZAM	Racheal Kundananji (transferred to Chicago Stars FC)
10	FW	ITA	Cristiana Girelli (on loan from Juventus)
11	DF	USA	Kelli Hubly
12	FW	USA	Tess Boade
13	DF	USA	Abby Dahlkemper
16	DF	CAN	Sydney Collins
17	FW	USA	Alex Pfeiffer
18	MF	USA	Joelle Anderson
19	MF	USA	Dorian Bailey
20	DF	USA	Alyssa Malonson (SEI)
21	DF	ARG	Aldana Cometti
23	MF	USA	Caroline Conti
24	DF	USA	Maddie Moreau
25	DF	ENG	Anouk Denton
27	FW	ENG	Keira Barry
29	GK	USA	Jordan Silkowitz
30	FW	ARG	Agostina Holzheier
31	DF	USA	Jenna Nighswonger
32	GK	USA	Emmie Allen
41	MF	USA	Hannah Bebar
47	MF	USA	Kennedy Fuller

=== Out on loan ===
No.	Pos.	Nation	Player
14	MF	USA	Jamie Shepherd (on loan to Dallas Trinity)
22	DF	CAN	Brooklyn Courtnall (on loan to San Diego Wave FC)

== Competitions ==
=== Friendlies ===
April 17, 2026 Friendly	Bay FC	1–0	Ottawa Rapid FC	San Jose, California
7:00 p.m. PDT (UTC-7)	Conti 59' (pen.)	Report		Stadium: PayPal Park

=== Regular season ===
==== Regular season standings ====
Pos	Team	Pld	W	D	L	GF	GA	GD	Pts
12	Houston Dash	30	9	6	15	38	44	−6	33
13	Boston Legacy FC	30	9	6	15	41	53	−12	33
14	Bay FC	30	7	6	17	30	47	−17	27
15	Racing Louisville FC	30	7	3	20	38	62	−24	24
16	Chicago Stars FC	30	5	2	23	17	71	−54	17

Source: NWSL
Rules for classification: 1) points; 2) total goal difference; 3) total wins; 4) total goals scored; 5) head-to-head points; 6) head-to-head goal goals scored; 7) fewest disciplinary points; 8) coin toss (if 2 clubs tied) or drawing of lots (if ≥3 clubs tied).

==== Results summary ====
Overall								Home						Away					
Pld	W	D	L	GF	GA	GD	Pts	W	D	L	GF	GA	GD	W	D	L	GF	GA	GD
30	7	6	17	30	47	−17	27	4	3	8	16	20	−4	3	3	9	14	27	−13

Last updated: November 1, 2026.
Source: NWSLsoccer.com

==== Results by matchday ====
Matchday	1	2	3	4	5	6	7	8	9	10	11	12	13	14	15	16	17	18	19	20	21	22	23	24	25	26	27	28	29	30
Ground	H	H	A	H	A	A	H	H	A	H	A	A	A	H	A	H	H	A	A	H	A	H	A	A	H	H	A	H	A	H
Result	W	L	W	L	L	W	D	D	L	L	L	D	W	W	L	L	L	D	L	W	L	L	L	D	W	L	L	D	L	L
Position	4	8	6	10	12	10	10	8	13	13	13	13	13	11	14	14	14	14	15	14	14	15	15	14	13	13	13	14	14	14

Updated to match(es) played on November 1, 2026. Source: NWSLsoccer.com
A = Away; H = Home; W = Win; D = Draw; L = Loss; P = Postponed; = NWSL Shield; = NWSL Playoffs

==== Matches ====
Win Draw Loss

==== March ====
March 14, 2026 1	Bay FC	2–1	Denver Summit FC	San Jose, California
3:30 p.m. PDT (UTC-7)	Pfeiffer 8'; Anderson 31', (yellow card) 51'; Barry (yellow card) 88'; Kundananji (yellow card) 90+5'	Report	Kössler 20'; Sonis (red card) 27'	Stadium: PayPal Park; Attendance: 13,110; Referee: Nabil Bensalah

March 21, 2026 2	Bay FC	1–3	Angel City FC	San Jose, California
5:45 p.m. PDT (UTC-7)	Moreau (yellow card) 27'; Huff 56', (yellow card) 90+5' (yellow-red card) 90+7'; Collins (yellow card) 90+2'	Report	Jónsdóttir 3', 53', (yellow card) 33'; Thompson 32'; Gorden (yellow card) 83'	Stadium: PayPal Park; Attendance: 10,299; Referee: Jaclyn Metz

March 28, 2026 3	North Carolina Courage	1–3	Bay FC	Cary, North Carolina
4:00 p.m. PDT (UTC-7)	Ijeh (yellow card) 45+9'; Matsukubo 65'	Report	Pfeiffer 20'; Barry 30', (yellow card) 41'; Bailey 34'; Lema (yellow card) 76'	Stadium: WakeMed Soccer Park; Attendance: 7,013; Referee: Shawn Tehini

==== April ====
April 5, 2026 4	Bay FC	0–2	Washington Spirit	San Jose, California
2:00 p.m. PDT (UTC-7)	Courtnall (yellow card) 90'	Report	Courtnall 57' (o.g.); Monday 86'	Stadium: PayPal Park; Attendance: 10,237; Referee: Matthew Corrigan

April 25, 2026 5	Gotham FC	3–0	Bay FC	Harrison, New Jersey
10:00 a.m. PDT (UTC-7)	Lema 20' (o.g.); Lavelle 40'; González 45+6' (pen.)	Report	Hutton (yellow card) 74'	Stadium: Sports Illustrated Stadium; Attendance: 7,184; Referee: Natalie Simon

==== May ====
May 3, 2026 6	San Diego Wave FC	0–1	Bay FC	San Diego, California
4:00 p.m. PDT (UTC-7)	Dali (penalty missed) 17'; Dudinha (yellow card) 54'; Morroni (yellow card) 59'	Report	Kundananji 5'; Hutton (yellow card) 11'; Cometti (yellow card) 15'; Silkowitz (penalty missed) 17'; Lema (yellow card) 43'; Denton (yellow card) 47'	Stadium: Snapdragon Stadium; Attendance: 13,508; Referee: Katja Koroleva

May 10, 2026 7	Bay FC	0–0	Utah Royals	San Jose, California
1:00 p.m. PDT (UTC-7)	Hutton (yellow card) 55'; Cometti (yellow card) 65'; Anderson (yellow card) 80'	Report	Milazzo (yellow card) 70'	Stadium: PayPal Park; Attendance: 11,689; Referee: Cristian Campo

May 15, 2026 8	Bay FC	1–1	Boston Legacy FC	San Jose, California
7:00 p.m. PDT (UTC-7)	Bailey 51'; Silkowitz (yellow card) 63'	Report	St-Georges (red card) 42'; Gutierres 64' (pen.); Karich (yellow card) 76'	Stadium: PayPal Park; Attendance: 12,533; Referee: Gerald Flores

May 20, 2026 9	Portland Thorns FC	2–0	Bay FC	Portland, Oregon
7:00 p.m. PDT (UTC-7)	Vignola 30'; McKenzie 77', (yellow card) 90'	Report	Cometti (yellow card) 65'	Stadium: Providence Park; Attendance: 15,683; Referee: John Griggs

May 24, 2026 10	Bay FC	0–1	Chicago Stars FC	San Jose, California
2:00 p.m. PDT (UTC-7)	Cometti (red card) 12'; Hutton (yellow card) 32'; Silkowitz (red card) 62'; Moreau (yellow card) 90'	Report	Gomes (yellow card) 45'; Swanson 70'; Hayashi (yellow card) 88'; Atkinson (yellow card) 90+5'	Stadium: PayPal Park; Attendance: 12,015; Referee: Atahan Yaya

May 29, 2026 11	Orlando Pride	3–1	Bay FC	Orlando, Florida
4:00 p.m. PDT (UTC-7)	Banda 4', 51'; Dyke 55'	Report	Conti 7'	Stadium: Inter&Co Stadium; Attendance: 8,140; Referee: Jaclyn Metz

==== July ====
July 5, 2026 12	Boston Legacy FC	2–2	Bay FC	Pawtucket, Rhode Island
9:00 a.m. PDT (UTC-7)	Murphy (yellow card) 3'; Carabalí (yellow card) 8'; Gutierres 45+2'; Traoré 79' (pen.); Karich (yellow card) 81'	Report	Hutton 5' (pen.); Lema 17'; Courtnall (yellow card) 90+11'	Stadium: Centreville Bank Stadium; Attendance: 8,014; Referee: Joshua Encarnación

July 10, 2026 13	Racing Louisville FC	0–2	Bay FC	Louisville, Kentucky
5:00 p.m. PDT (UTC-7)	McMahon (yellow card) 70'	Report	Fuller 21'; Moreau (yellow card) 28'; Lema 58'	Stadium: Lynn Family Stadium; Attendance: 5,328; Referee: Trevor Wiseman

July 18, 2026 14	Bay FC	3–0	North Carolina Courage	San Jose, California
1:00 p.m. PDT (UTC-7)	Lema 14', 17'; Kundananji 54'	Report		Stadium: PayPal Park; Attendance: 12,081; Referee: Lauren Aldrich

July 24, 2026 15	Houston Dash	1–0	Bay FC	Houston, Texas
5:00 p.m. PDT (UTC-7)	Patterson (yellow card) 39'; Ullmark 90+1'; Larisey (yellow card) 90+5'	Report	Conti (yellow card) 66'	Stadium: Shell Energy Stadium; Attendance: 7,270; Referee: Shawn Tehini

July 29, 2026 16	Bay FC	0–1	Gotham FC	San Jose, California
7:00 p.m. PDT (UTC-7)	Moreau (yellow card) 60'	Report	Purce 2'; Lavelle (yellow card) 81'	Stadium: PayPal Park; Attendance: 12,178; Referee: Servando Berna Rico

==== August ====
August 1, 2026 17	Bay FC	2–3	Seattle Reign FC	San Jose, California
5:45 p.m. PDT (UTC-7)	Bebar 13'; Bailey (yellow card) 45+5'; Conti (yellow card) 51'; Barry 75'	Report	Fishel 5' (yellow card) 45+2'; Dahlien 10'; Meza (yellow card) 64'; Mondésir (yellow card) 83'; Fishlock 85'	Stadium: PayPal Park; Attendance: 11,439; Referee: Alyssa Pennington

August 9, 2026 18	Chicago Stars FC	0–0	Bay FC	Evanston, Illinois
4:00 p.m. PDT (UTC-7)		Report	Hutton (yellow card) 49'; Collins (yellow card) 75'	Stadium: Martin Stadium; Attendance: 4,925; Referee: Iryna Petrunok

August 14, 2026 19	Utah Royals	3–2	Bay FC	Sandy, Utah
7:00 p.m. PDT (UTC-7)	Moriya 7'; Miura 22'; Tanaka 79' (pen.)	Report	Lema 6'; Gilchrist 29'; Nighswonger (yellow card) 71'	Stadium: America First Field; Attendance: 7,020; Referee: John Griggs

August 23, 2026 20	Bay FC	1–0	Houston Dash	San Jose, California
3:00 p.m. PDT (UTC-7)	Collins (yellow card) 84'; Girelli 89'	Report		Stadium: PayPal Park; Attendance: 12,548; Referee: Abdou Ndiaye

August 30, 2026 21	Washington Spirit	1–0	Bay FC	Washington, D.C.
9:30 a.m. PDT (UTC-7)	Metayer (yellow card) 35' (goal) 45+4'; Carle (yellow card) 79'	Report	Moreau (yellow card) 88'	Stadium: Audi Field; Attendance: 16,817; Referee: Calin Radosav

==== September ====
September 4, 2026 22	Bay FC	1–2	Kansas City Current	San Jose, California
7:00 p.m. PDT (UTC-7)	Lema 45+3', (yellow card) 57'; Bebar (yellow card) 84'	Report	I. Rodriguez 11'; Rouse (yellow card) 37'; Bethune (yellow card) 73'; R. Rodríguez 89'	Stadium: PayPal Park; Attendance: 10,569; Referee: Brad Jensen

September 12, 2026 23	Seattle Reign FC	2–0	Bay FC	Seattle, Washington
5:00 p.m. PDT (UTC-7)	Huerta 51' (pen.); Fishel (yellow card) 88'; Ratcliffe 90+3'	Report	Barry (yellow card) 60'	Stadium: Lumen Field; Attendance: 8,191; Referee: Lauren Aldrich

September 16, 2026 24	Denver Summit FC	2–2	Bay FC	Centennial, Colorado
6:30 p.m. PDT (UTC-7)	Heaps 42'; Sonis 57'	Report	Hutton 73'; Huff (yellow card) 79', (goal) 90+5'; Barry (yellow card) 90+7'	Stadium: Centennial Stadium; Attendance: 11,571; Referee: Marie Durr

September 20, 2026 25	Bay FC	2–0	Racing Louisville FC	San Jose, California
4:00 p.m. PDT (UTC-7)	Pfeiffer 50'; Lema 56'; Conti (yellow card) 90+2'	Report	Wright (yellow card) 35'	Stadium: PayPal Park; Attendance: 11,427; Referee: Amin Hadzic

September 27, 2026 26	Bay FC	1–3	Orlando Pride	San Jose, California
2:00 p.m. PDT (UTC-7)	Kundananji 11'; Holzheier (yellow card) 86'	Report	McCutcheon 2', 47'; Ovalle (yellow card) 87', (goal) 90+6'	Stadium: PayPal Park; Attendance: 11,393; Referee: Corbyn May

==== October and November ====
October 3, 2026 27	Kansas City Current	5–1	Bay FC	Kansas City, Missouri
3:30 p.m. PDT (UTC-7)	Hopkins 24'; Debinha 46', 53', 75'; Chawinga 89'	Report	Lema 4'	Stadium: CPKC Stadium; Attendance: 11,500; Referee: Edson Carvajal

October 18, 2026 28	Bay FC	2–2	Portland Thorns FC	San Jose, California
2:00 p.m. PDT (UTC-7)	Conti 33', (yellow card) 45'; Fuller 67'	Report	Weaver 10'; Reyes (yellow card) 74'; Hanks 86'	Stadium: PayPal Park; Attendance: 14,451; Referee: Alexandra Billeter

October 24, 2026 29	Angel City FC	2–0	Bay FC	Los Angeles, California
5:45 p.m. PDT (UTC-7)	King (yellow card) 13'; Thompson 49'; Lageyre (yellow card) 52'; Tiernan 83'	Report	Moreau (yellow card) 67'	Stadium: BMO Stadium; Attendance: 20,548; Referee: Shawn Tehini

November 1, 2026 30	Bay FC	0–1	San Diego Wave FC	San Jose, California
2:00 p.m. PST (UTC-8)		Report	Van Zanten 9'	Stadium: PayPal Park; Attendance: 15,927; Referee: Iryna Petrunok

== Statistics ==
As of November 20, 2026

=== Appearances and goals ===
Starting appearances are listed first, followed by substitute appearances after the + symbol where applicable.

No.	Pos	Nat	Player	Total		NWSL	
No.	Pos	Nat	Player	Apps	Goals	Apps	Goals
Goalkeepers
1	GK	(United States) USA	Camryn Miller	0	0	0	0
29	GK	(United States) USA	Jordan Silkowitz	29	0	29	0
32	GK	(United States) USA	Emmie Allen	2	0	1+1	0
Defenders
2	DF	(United States) USA	Heather Gilchrist	10	1	9+1	1
3	DF	(United States) USA	Caprice Dydasco	0	0	0	0
4	DF	(United States) USA	Emily Menges	1	0	0+1	0
11	DF	(United States) USA	Kelli Hubly	12	0	1+11	0
13	DF	(United States) USA	Abby Dahlkemper	2	0	0+2	0
16	DF	(Canada) CAN	Sydney Collins	28	0	27+1	0
20	DF	(United States) USA	Alyssa Malonson	0	0	0	0
21	DF	(Argentina) ARG	Aldana Cometti	22	0	19+3	0
22	DF	(Canada) CAN	Brooklyn Courtnall	11	0	7+4	0
24	DF	(United States) USA	Maddie Moreau	28	0	15+13	0
25	DF	(England) ENG	Anouk Denton	8	0	6+2	0
31	DF	(United States) USA	Jenna Nighswonger	12	0	11+1	0
Midfielders
7	MF	(United States) USA	Taylor Huff	22	2	18+4	2
8	MF	(United States) USA	Claire Hutton	28	2	27+1	2
12	MF	(United States) USA	Tess Boade	2	0	0+2	0
14	MF	(United States) USA	Jamie Shepherd	1	0	0+1	0
18	MF	(United States) USA	Joelle Anderson	26	1	24+2	1
19	MF	(United States) USA	Dorian Bailey	20	2	11+9	2
23	MF	(United States) USA	Caroline Conti	24	2	8+16	2
41	MF	(United States) USA	Hannah Bebar	30	1	30	1
47	MF	(United States) USA	Kennedy Fuller	15	2	13+2	2
Forwards
5	FW	(United States) USA	Karlie Lema	30	8	24+6	8
6	FW	(United States) USA	Onyeka Gamero	5	0	0+5	0
9	FW	(Zambia) ZAM	Racheal Kundananji	18	3	14+4	3
10	FW	(Italy) ITA	Cristiana Girelli	25	1	11+14	1
17	FW	(United States) USA	Alex Pfeiffer	20	3	18+2	3
27	FW	(England) ENG	Keira Barry	22	2	4+18	2
30	FW	(Argentina) ARG	Agostina Holzheier	9	0	3+6	0

== Transactions ==
=== Transfers in ===
Date	Player	Pos.	Previous club	Fee/notes	Ref.
January 6, 2026	(Canada) Brooklyn Courtnall	DF	(United States) North Carolina Courage	Transfer	
January 7, 2026	(United States) Alex Pfeiffer	FW	(United States) Kansas City Current	Transfer	
February 2, 2026	(England) Anouk Denton	DF	(England) West Ham United	Transfer	
February 4, 2026	(England) Keira Barry	FW	(England) Manchester United	Transfer	
February 11, 2026	(United States) Claire Hutton	MF	(United States) Kansas City Current	Traded in exchange for 1.1 million	
March 4, 2026	(Argentina) Aldana Cometti	MF	(France) FC Fleury 91	Transfer	
June 17, 2026	(United States) Kennedy Fuller	MF	(United States) Angel City FC	Traded in exchange for $500,000 in intra-league transfer funds and $20,000 in allocation money.	
July 31, 2026	(Argentina) Agostina Holzheier	FW	(Argentina) Racing Club	Transfer. Signed contract a four-year contract through 2029, with a fifth-year option.	
August 10, 2026	(United States) Jenna Nighswonger	DF	(England) Arsenal	Transfer	

=== Transfers out ===
Date	Player	Pos.	Destination club	Fee/notes	Ref.
December 23, 2025	(United States) Rachel Hill	FW	(United States) Racing Louisville FC	Transfer	
January 2, 2026	(United States) Jordan Brewster	DF		Out of contract	
January 12, 2026	(United States) Leah Freeman	GK	(United States) San Diego Wave FC	Transfer	
January 16, 2026	(United States) Kiki Pickett	MF	(United States) San Diego Wave FC	Transfer	
March 11, 2026	(United States) Penelope Hocking	FW	(United States) Kansas City Current	Trade	
October 8, 2026	(Zambia) Racheal Kundananji	FW	(United States) Chicago Stars FC	Transfer	

=== Loans in ===
Date	Player	Pos.	Previous club	Fee/notes	Ref.
February 27, 2026	(Italy) Cristiana Girelli	FW	(Italy) Juventus	Loan until August	

=== Loans out ===
Date	Player	Pos.	Loaned to	Fee/notes	Ref.
July 27, 2026	(United States) Jamie Shepherd	MF	(United States) Dallas Trinity FC	Loaned through the remainder of the 2026 calendar year	
July 31, 2026	(Canada) Brooklyn Courtnall	DF	(United States) San Diego Wave FC	Loaned through the 2026 NWSL season	

== See also ==
- 2026 National Women's Soccer League season
- 2026 in American soccer
