= Claire Hutton =

American soccer player (born 2006)

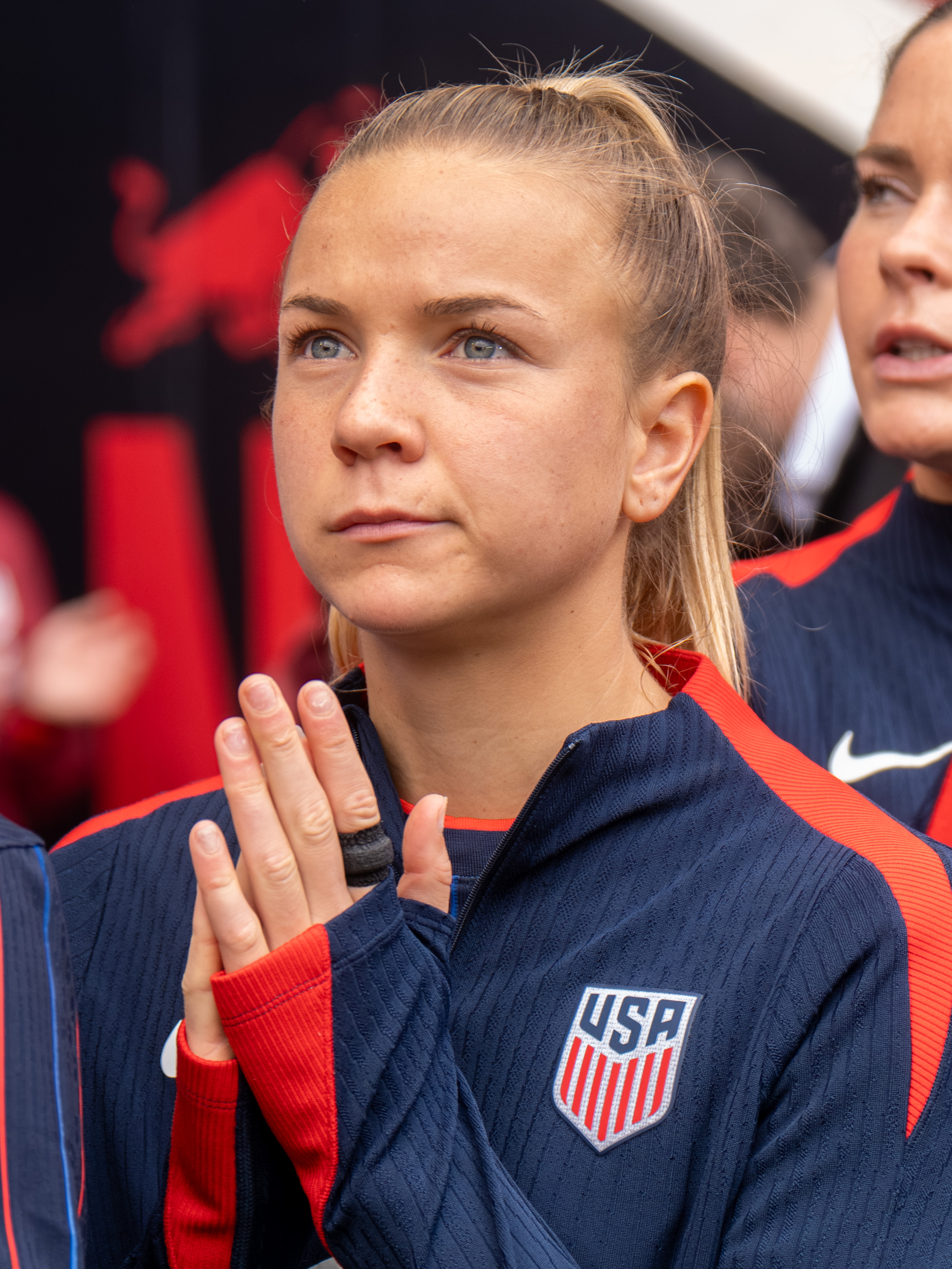
- Hutton with the United States in 2026

Personal information
- Full name: Claire Catherine Hutton
- Date of birth: January 11, 2006 (age 20)
- Height: 5 ft 6 in (1.68 m)
- Position: Defensive midfielder

Team information
- Current team: Bay FC
- Number: 8

Youth career
- 2015–2019: Alleycats SC
- 2018–2022: Bethlehem Central Eagles
- 2019–2023: World Class FC

Senior career*
Years	Team	Apps	(Gls)
2024–2025	Kansas City Current	47	(0)
2026–	Bay FC	28	(2)

International career^{‡}
2022	United States U17	5	(6)
2023	United States U19	4	(2)
2024	United States U20	10	(0)
2025–	United States	22	(1)
Medal record
Women's soccer
Representing United States
FIFA U-20 Women's World Cup
Bronze medal – third place	Colombia 2024
- * Club domestic league appearances and goals as of 05:08, November 2, 2026 (UTC) ‡ National team caps and goals as of October 13, 2026

Claire Catherine Hutton (born January 11, 2006) is an American professional soccer player who plays as a defensive midfielder for Bay FC of the National Women's Soccer League (NWSL) and the United States national team. She joined the Kansas City Current at age 17 in 2023, winning the NWSL Shield and earning first-team NWSL Best XI honors in 2025.

Hutton won bronze medals as a youth international at the 2023 Pan American Games and the 2024 FIFA U-20 Women's World Cup before making her senior debut in 2025.

== Early life ==
Hutton grew up in Bethlehem, New York, the daughter of Jennifer and Brett Hutton, and has two brothers. She began playing soccer at age four before joining Alleycats Soccer Club at age nine, where she played up several age groups and trained with boys' teams under the leadership of former USWNT player Betsy Drambour. She later moved to World Class FC, where she earned ECNL All-American honors twice.

Hutton joined the varsity girls' team at Bethlehem Central High School as a seventh grader in 2018, helping lead the team to the Class AA state final and earning all-state honors. In 2019, she was named the Class AA state player of the year as an eighth grader after scoring a school record 36 goals and adding 19 assists while helping the team repeat as sectional champions. She missed much of the next two seasons as a result of the COVID-19 pandemic and youth international call-ups. In her junior year in 2022, she joined the varsity boys' team and was their starting forward, scoring 4 goals in 14 games. That year, she also committed to play college soccer for the North Carolina Tar Heels. TopDrawerSoccer ranked her as the 17th-best recruit in their first rankings of the class of 2024.

== Club career ==
=== Kansas City Current ===
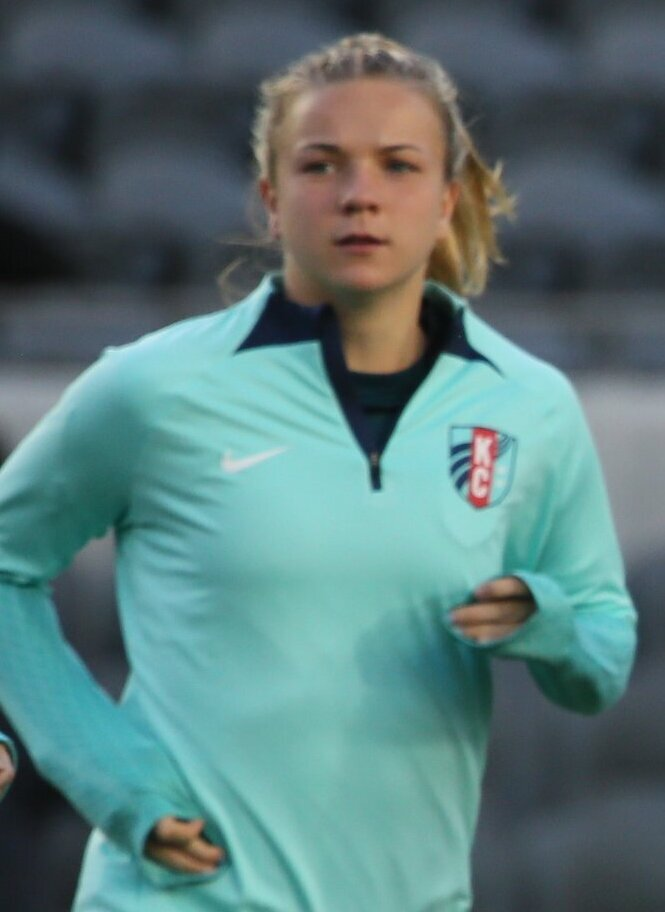
Hutton warming up with the Kansas City Current in 2024

After graduating one year early from high school in June 2023, Hutton took a gap semester and trained with the North Carolina Courage and NJ/NY Gotham FC for a month each. While she planned to enroll at the University of North Carolina in the spring, the New Jersey club suggested that she consider turning professional instead of going to college. She thought things over for several months before trying out with the Kansas City Current and eventually deciding to sign with the club and give up her college eligibility. On December 14, the Current announced that they had signed Hutton to her first professional contract on a three-year deal through the NWSL's Under-18 Entry Mechanism.

Hutton made her professional debut on March 18, 2024, playing the full 90 minutes in a season-opening 5–4 win over the Portland Thorns as the Current inaugurated their newly built CPKC Stadium. Immediately performing well beyond her years, she made vital contributions to head coach Vlatko Andonovski's midfield through ball-winning and progressive passing, creating a strong partnership with captain Lo'eau LaBonta. She made her first professional assist on May 25, heading to set up Elizabeth Ball's goal in a 1–0 win at the Utah Royals. On August 1, she scored her first professional goal with a strike from the edge of the box to conclude a 4–1 win over Mexican club Tigres in the NWSL x Liga MX Femenil Summer Cup. On October 25, she combined with LaBonta to set up both goals by Temwa Chawinga in a 2–0 victory over Gotham FC in the Summer Cup final, earning her first professional trophy.

Hutton played in 22 league games as a rookie in 2024, starting 19, as the Current placed fourth in the standings, their best finish at the time. Despite being away for a month at the 2024 FIFA U-20 Women's World Cup, she ranked fourth on the team with over 1,600 minutes played. In the playoffs, she started both games as the Current won 1–0 against the North Carolina Courage in the quarterfinals, then lost 3–2 to the Orlando Pride in the semifinals. She was one of three finalists for NWSL Rookie of the Year, losing to the Washington Spirit's Croix Bethune.

In 2025, Hutton made 25 appearances, starting 22, and played over 1,800 minutes, helping the Current win the NWSL Shield with the best record in the league. The team set multiple NWSL records including most points, most wins, and fewest goals allowed in a season. Her close friend Ally Sentnor joined the Current midseason in a then record intraleague trade. In the playoffs, Hutton played the entire extra-time match as the Current were upset 2–1 by eventual champions Gotham FC in the quarterfinals. She was one of five finalists for NWSL Midfielder of the Year, along with teammate Debinha, as players from the Current made up one-third of all NWSL award nominees. ESPN named her the top player in the league under the age of twenty. She was named to the NWSL Best XI First Team along with teammates Temwa Chawinga, Lorena, Izzy Rodriguez, and Kayla Sharples.

=== Bay FC ===
On February 11, 2026, Hutton was traded to Bay FC for US$1.1 million in intraleague transfer funds. This move and Croix Bethune's concurrent but separate move from Washington to Kansas City were the second and third largest transfers in NWSL history. Bay's new head coach Emma Coates named Hutton and Hannah Bebar as vice captains alongside captain Sydney Collins. She debuted for the club in the season opener on March 14, playing the full match as Bay won 2–1 against expansion team Denver Summit. Two weeks later, she signed a long-term contract extension with Bay, committing her future to the club through 2030. On July 5, she scored her first goal for Bay – her first NWSL regular-season goal – from the penalty spot against expansion team Boston Legacy; she also provided an assist in the match, which ended 2–2.

== International career ==
=== Youth national team ===
Hutton made her international debut for the United States under-17 team at the 2022 CONCACAF Women's U-17 Championship, scoring six goals (third on the team) as they won the tournament. Despite her performance, she was left out of Natalia Astrain's roster for the 2022 FIFA U-17 Women's World Cup, a decision that would only spur her drive to develop. She was selected by Carrie Kveton to captain the under-19 team at the 2023 Pan American Games in Chile, where they faced other countries' senior teams. She scored two goals at the tournament, including in the 2–0 win over Argentina for third place. She was consistently part of the under-20 team under Tracey Kevins the following year at age 18. She made five starts at the 2024 FIFA U-20 Women's World Cup in Colombia, missing two games because of concussion protocol, as the United States finished in third place, its best result since 2012.

=== Senior national team ===
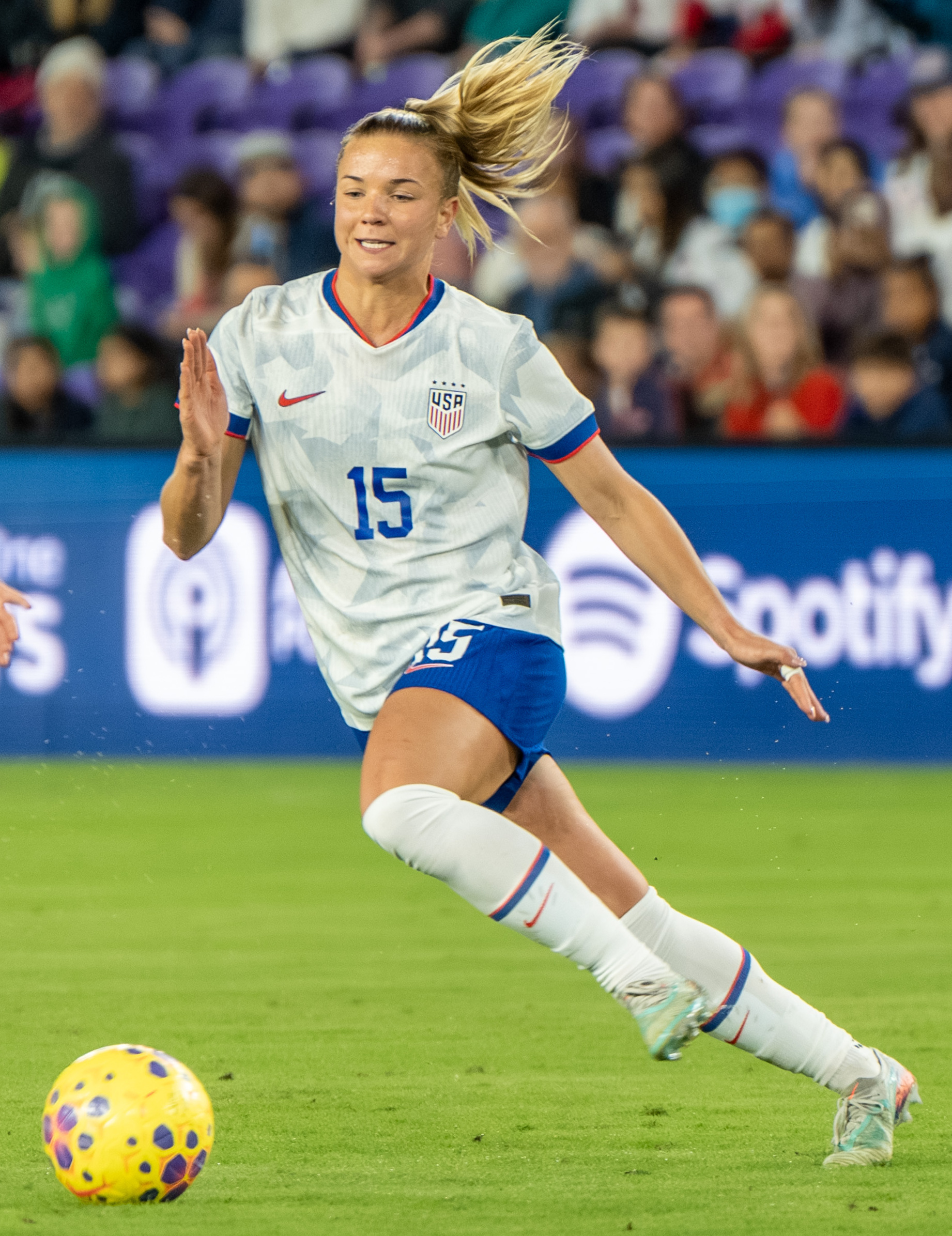
Hutton with the United States in 2025

Hutton was called up by Emma Hayes into Futures Camp, training alongside the senior national team, in January 2025. The following month, she was named to the senior roster for the SheBelieves Cup. On February 23, she made her senior international debut with the start against Australia in the SheBelieves Cup, setting up Michelle Cooper's winning goal with her through-ball to Ally Sentnor in the 2–1 victory. On July 2, she scored her first senior international goal in her sixth appearance, scoring a header from Rose Lavelle's corner kick in a 3–0 friendly win over Canada.

On January 24, 2026, Hutton wore the armband for the USWNT for the first time after Trinity Rodman was subbed out during a 6–0 friendly win against Paraguay, with Hayes calling Hutton a "future captain in the making". On April 14, she captained the USWNT for the entire match in a 1–0 friendly loss to Japan, becoming the USWNT's youngest captain from kickoff since 2001.

== Style of play ==
A defensive midfielder, Hutton possesses excellent vision, physical defensive ability, technical skill, and creativity. She has cited Sergio Busquets, Andrés Iniesta, and Kevin De Bruyne as inspirations, though her favorite player as a child was Ronaldinho.

== Career statistics ==
=== Club ===
As of match played October 3, 2026

Appearances and goals by club, season and competition
Club	Season	League			Playoffs		Other		Total	
Club	Season	Division	Apps	Goals	Apps	Goals	Apps	Goals	Apps	Goals
Kansas City Current	2024	NWSL	22	0	2	0	4 (Note: Appearances in NWSL x Liga MX Femenil Summer Cup)	1	28	1
Kansas City Current	2025	NWSL	25	0	1	0	0	0	26	0
Kansas City Current	Total		47	0	3	0	4	1	54	1
Bay FC	2026	NWSL	27	2	0	0	0	0	27	2
Career total			74	2	3	0	4	1	81	3

=== International ===
As of match played October 13, 2026

Appearances and goals by national team and year
National team	Year	Apps	Goals
United States	2025	11	1
United States	2026	11	0
Total		22	1

Scores and results list United States's goal tally first, score column indicates score after each Hutton goal.

List of international goals scored by Claire Hutton
No.	Date	Venue	Opponent	Score	Result	Competition
1	July 2, 2025	Audi Field, Washington, D.C., United States	Canada	2–0	3–0	Friendly

== Honors and awards ==
Kansas City Current

- NWSL Shield: 2025
- NWSL x Liga MX Femenil Summer Cup: 2024

United States U17

- CONCACAF Women's U-17 Championship: 2022

United States U19

- Pan American Games bronze medal: 2023

United States U20

- FIFA U-20 Women's World Cup bronze medal: 2024

United States

- SheBelieves Cup: 2026

Individual

- NWSL Best XI First Team: 2025
