= Molly Walker =

Molly Walker may refer to:

- Molly Walker (footballer)
- Molly Manning Walker, British cinematographer and director
- Molly Walker (Heroes)
