= List of most expensive women's association football transfers =

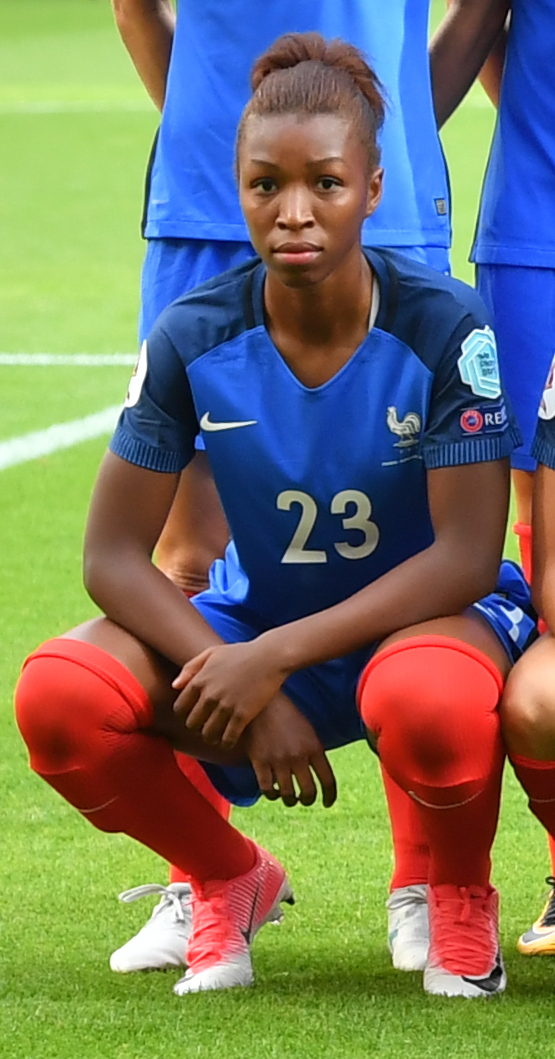
Grace Geyoro, whose move to London City Lionesses marked the highest transfer fee ever paid for a women's footballer

The following is a list of the most expensive women's association football transfers, which details the highest transfer fees ever paid for players, as well as transfers which set new world transfer records.

The first transfer in women's football reported as a record was that of Milene Domingues from Fiammamonza to Rayo Vallecano in 2002, two decades before professionalism in Spanish women's football. The current transfer record was set by the transfer of Grace Geyoro from Paris Saint-Germain to London City Lionesses for £1.43 million in September 2025 as they began their first season in the English top-flight Women's Super League.

The most expensive transfer to a team not in the top tier is the €300,000 potential total fee for the transfer of Julia Torres from Sevilla to Barcelona B set in March 2026; also the highest transfer fee between two Spanish teams at the time it was agreed, the total fee includes bonuses contingent on Torres ultimately playing for Barcelona's first team. The only known transfer fee for a player not in the top two flights was paid for Weronika Araśniewicz of Barcelona C when VfL Wolfsburg exercised their purchase option in July 2026, though Araśniewicz was signed to join their first team in the top tier.

In 2020, the Spanish then-Primera División introduced its Compensation List, a means for signatory clubs to retain the rights of under-23 players whose contracts had expired until another Spanish club paid a fee set by the owning club. Intended to compensate the costs of youth development, the fees were instead set disproportionately high for the global and internal market (all requests would have been records); unable to find new clubs in Spain, the players named on the Compensation List either stayed at clubs that did not wish to play them or moved abroad, with the list scrapped by the end of the year without having facilitated a transfer.

Later that year, the USA's National Women's Soccer League introduced allocation money, giving its constituent clubs options to make fee-involved trades and exchange the allocation money credits for the NWSL to purchase players from other leagues. The NWSL began phasing out allocation money in 2024, with an aim to stop its use by 2026, as part of its measures to shift to a more international transfer system and in recognition of other leagues financially outpacing it.

== Highest transfer payments in women's association football ==
=== Most expensive player transfers ===
Keira Walsh and Tarciane both appear twice on the list. The players on the list include at least one from each continental region except Oceania (OFC). Though players from Europe (UEFA), North America (CONCACAF), South America (CONMEBOL), Africa (CAF), and Asia (AFC) are all represented, most are European and the purchasing clubs are all European, North American, or Asian.

This list only includes transfers where a fee amount is reported publicly. Fees are in thousands. (Note: Monetary values are not adjusted for inflation; converted figures are as of the date of transfer. Where converted figures would produce alternative rankings, the value of the original currency should be used to sort.)

This list does not include NWSL domestic trades, which can involve cash equivalents that are managed by the league and/or non-cash assets. These are listed below as the #Largest cash-equivalent trades.

As of 29 July 2026

Fee broke the women's world football transfer record at the time of the transfer
Fee broke the national league record at the time of the transfer
Fee broke the women's record for a South American player at the time of the transfer
Fee broke the women's record for an Asian player at the time of the transfer
Fee broke the women's record for an African player at the time of the transfer
Fee broke the women's record for a North American player at the time of the transfer
Fee broke the women's record for a European player at the time of the transfer

Rank	Player	From	To	Position	Transfer fee			Year	Ref(s).
Rank	Player	From	To	Position	£ thousand	€ thousand	$ thousand	Year	Ref(s).
1	(France) Grace Geyoro	(France) Paris Saint-Germain	(England) London City Lionesses	Midfielder	1,430 (Note: Originally reported in French sources as a world record fee of £1.43 million, London City stated the next day that it was not a record but "around the £1m mark". London City also spent around £430,000 on Lucía Corrales in the same window. When FIFA's 2025 report on international transfers was released at the end of the year, Geyoro was listed as the most expensive transfer, necessitating it as a world record fee.)	1,650	1,923	2025	
2	(United States) Alyssa Thompson	(United States) Angel City	(England) Chelsea	Forward	<1,430 (Note: Thompson's transfer, which was confirmed shortly before Geyoro's, was a Chelsea record fee; "at least on-par" with Smith's previous record fee (which as a domestic fee would not be listed by FIFA); and described as just short of Ovalle's then-world record but able to become a new world record with bonuses that would take Thompson's fee up to around $2 million. At the end of 2025, FIFA confirmed Thompson's transfer as the second most expensive international transfer behind Geyoro's and above Ovalle's.)	<1,650	<1,923	2025	
3	(Sweden) Felicia Schröder	(Sweden) BK Häcken	(Spain) Real Madrid	Forward	1,294	1,500 (Note: Häcken declined to disclose the transfer fee but said that it would be a world record based on the reported fee for Ovalle's August 2025 record. The fee was otherwise reported as €1.5 million. As Ovalle was listed by FIFA as the third most expensive women's transfer of 2025, Schröder's transfer exceeding that could be a new record, or second or third. Based on reporting of Geyoro's record, the reported €1.5 million for Schröder would be second or third behind that.)	1,714	2026	
3	(Brazil) Kerolin	(England) Manchester City	(Spain) Barcelona	Forward	1,280	1,500 (Note: Around €1.2 million base fee and performance-based variables up to around €1.5 million total.)	1,700	2026	
5	(Mexico) Lizbeth Ovalle ‡	(Mexico) Tigres UANL	(United States) Orlando Pride	Forward	1,111	1,285	1,500 (Note: Mexican reports suggested the fee could rise to $2 million, though sources in the United States and elsewhere confirmed its ceiling at $1.5 million.)	2025	
6	(Canada) Olivia Smith	(England) Liverpool	(England) Arsenal	Forward	1,000	1,160	1,360	2025	
7	(United States) Naomi Girma	(United States) San Diego Wave	(England) Chelsea	Defender	883	1,050	1,100	2025	
8	(France) Melvine Malard	(England) Manchester United	(England) Chelsea	Forward	850 (Note: Typically reported as £850k, some sources suggested £750k; the fee was equated to over €1 million, which also aligns with the higher amount.)	1,000	1,138	2026	
9	(Brazil) Tarciane	(United States) Houston Dash	(France) OL Lyonnes	Defender	797	960 (Note: Reported as a Houston Dash club record sale and "among the highest in NWSL history", it had previously been reported as equivalent to $830,000 and almost a world record with potential bonuses (up to €960,000). By the end of the season, the bonuses were reportedly met.)	979	2025	
10	(Paraguay) Claudia Martínez ‡	(Paraguay) Olimpia	(United States) Washington Spirit	Forward	703	805	950	2026	
11	(England) Keira Walsh	(Spain) Barcelona	(England) Chelsea	Midfielder	714 (Note: Base fee of €550,000 (£460,000), as widely reported. According to BBC Sport, Barcelona said that the fee including bonuses was worth up to £800,000 (€956,000). At the end of the season, Spanish media reported the fee had risen to €850,000.)	850	884	2025	
12	(Zambia) Racheal Kundananji †	(Spain) Madrid CFF	(United States) Bay FC	Forward	685	805 (Note: €700,000 release clause, €35,000 (5%) training fee applicable, and $75,000 (€70,000) additional variables.)	862	2024	
13	(United States) Sam Coffey	(United States) Portland Thorns	(England) Manchester City	Midfielder	650	750	875	2026	
14	(Mexico) Kiana Palacios ‡	(Mexico) América	(United States) Utah Royals	Forward	600	680	800	2026	
15	(Zambia) Barbra Banda †	(China) Shanghai Shengli	(United States) Orlando Pride	Forward	582	681	740	2024	
16	(Sweden) Ellen Wangerheim	(Sweden) Hammarby IF	(England) Manchester United	Forward	560 (Note: Reported as 7 million Swedish krona)	645	750	2026	
17	(Germany) Lisa Baum	(Germany) RB Leipzig	(England) Arsenal	Forward	510	600	690	2026	
17	(Netherlands) Nina Nijstad ‡	(Netherlands) PSV Eindhoven	(United States) Portland Thorns	Midfielder	510	600	684	2026	
17	(Sweden) Johanna Rytting Kaneryd	(England) Chelsea	(France) OL Lyonnes	Midfielder	510	600	684	2026	
17	(Netherlands) Janou Levels	(Germany) VfL Wolfsburg	(Spain) Real Madrid	Defender	510	600	684	2026	
21	(France) Kadidiatou Diani	(France) OL Lyonnes	(England) London City Lionesses	Forward	>500	>586	>670	2026	
22	(England) Niamh Charles	(England) Chelsea	(England) Manchester City	Defender	500	580	670	2026	
23	(France) Kelly Gago	(England) Everton	(England) West Ham United	Forward	<500 (Note: Described as around €600,000 but below Gago's release clause of £500,000 due to negotiations.)	<590	<670	2026	
24	(Slovenia) Lara Prašnikar ‡	(Germany) Eintracht Frankfurt	(United States) Utah Royals	Forward	478	550	643 (Note: In order to register Prašnikar, Utah Royals also spent $10,000 intra-league transfer funds acquiring an international roster spot from Orlando Pride.)	2025	
25	(France) Oriane Jean-François	(England) Chelsea	(England) Aston Villa	Midfielder	450	519	607	2026	
26	(Italy) Giulia Dragoni	(Spain) Barcelona	(England) Chelsea	Midfielder	>428	>500 (Note: Base fee of over €500,000 (but less than €600,000), not including bonuses.)	>576	2026	
27	(Spain) Lucía Corrales	(Spain) Barcelona	(England) London City Lionesses	Forward	433	500 (Note: Fee was considered as London City paying Corrales' release clause after Barcelona had to rescind on her contract renewal. Some sources suggested the clause was €540,000.)	585	2025	
28	(England) Keira Walsh	(England) Manchester City	(Spain) Barcelona	Midfielder	400 (Note: Including bonuses up to €70,000 / £61,000. Initial fee of €400,000 / £348,000 would be a record in itself. Forbes reported a fee of €500,000, also describing Walsh as women's football's "first $500,000 player". The approximately £400,000 figure is most consistently reported and accepted.)	470	470	2022	
29	(United States) Lily Yohannes	(Netherlands) Ajax	(France) OL Lyonnes	Forward	391	450	526	2025	
29	(Denmark) Sofie Svava	(France) OL Lyonnes	(Italy) Como	Midfielder	383	450	515	2026	
31	(Brazil) Priscila	(Brazil) Internacional	(Mexico) América	Forward	383 (Note: Transfer valued at R$2.8 million, not including bonuses.)	448	503	2024	
32	(France) Alice Sombath	(France) OL Lyonnes	(England) Tottenham Hotspur	Defender	>378 (Note: A club record fee greater than Signe Gaupset's previous £378,000 fee.)	>443	>505	2026	
33	(Norway) Signe Gaupset	(Norway) Brann	(England) Tottenham Hotspur	Midfielder	378	430	495	2025	
34	(Colombia) Mayra Ramírez	(Spain) Levante	(England) Chelsea	Forward	384 (Note: €450,000 fixed and €50,000 variables that Levante expected to be met: one clause was that Ramírez must appear in 30% of games over her four-and-a-half year contract. The potential total was described in Press Association reports as £384,000 and £42,000 in add-ons (£426,000). The fee was considered to be meeting Ramírez' release clause; Spanish media reported prior to the signing that it was expected to be slightly below or equal to the previous world record, with English media focusing on how it exceeded the previous record purchase by Chelsea (a former world record) and would be a British record. Levante announced details of the fee at the same time as the transfer. In some sources reported as a world record, Ramírez' base fee was below the previous record, and the total potential fee was not met before the record was broken once again. By the end of the season after her transfer, her fee was still considered at its base amount; in FIFA's report of the most expensive 2024 transfers, released a year after her transfer, Ramírez was ranked in a position that would align with only the base fee.)	450	486	2024	
34	(Germany) Lena Oberdorf	(Germany) VfL Wolfsburg	(Germany) Bayern Munich	Midfielder	384	450 (Note: Fee was player's release clause; it was triggered in February 2024 for Oberdorf to transfer at the end of the season (June 2024).)	484	2024	
36	(Portugal) Kika Nazareth	(Portugal) Benfica	(Spain) Barcelona	Forward	339	400 (Note: Nazareth was included (as fifth) on FIFA's list of the most expensive international transfers of 2024, based on US dollar values that place her transfer as more expensive than Ewa Pajor's. As Lena Oberdorf's transfer was domestic, it would not feature on FIFA's list.)	432	2024	
36	(Poland) Ewa Pajor	(Germany) VfL Wolfsburg	(Spain) Barcelona	Forward	338	400	429	2024	
38	(Brazil) Tarciane †	(Brazil) Corinthians	(United States) Houston Dash	Defender	<346	<406	<432 (Note: Though reported as the record fee involving a Brazilian team, Tarciane's transfer was not on FIFA's 2024 list of the five most expensive transfers, while Priscila's (who was sold by a Brazilian team prior to Tarciane in 2024) was. Tarciane's fee is necessarily lower than the US dollar value of Kika Nazareth's transfer, who appeared at fifth on FIFA's list.)	2024	
39	(United States) Ayo Oke ‡	(Mexico) Pachuca	(United States) Denver Summit	Defender	333	387	450	2026	
40	(Sweden) Evelyn Ijeh ‡	(Italy) Milan	(United States) NC Courage	Forward	305+	350+ (Note: Reported in Italy as a fee over €350,000, American women's transfer reporter Jeff Kassouf placed the fee at around $450,000.)	413+	2026	
41	(Netherlands) Jill Roord	(Germany) VfL Wolfsburg	(England) Manchester City	Midfielder	300+ (Note: Reported to be a club signing fee for Manchester City, and by Sky Sports to be a British record fee, it was announced as "in excess of £300,000".)	350+	382+	2023	
42	(Australia) Kyra Cooney-Cross	(Sweden) Hammarby IF	(England) Arsenal	Midfielder	301	350 (Note: €250,000 fee and €100,000 variables.)	373	2023	
43	(Republic of Ireland) Denise O'Sullivan	(United States) NC Courage	(England) Liverpool	Midfielder	300	~344	~402	2026	
44	(Spain) Jana Fernández	(Spain) Barcelona	(England) London City Lionesses	Defender	260	300 (Note: Including bonuses. Base fee of at least €250,000.)	350	2025	
44	(Spain) Julia Torres	(Spain) Sevilla	(Spain) Barcelona B	Defender	261	300 (Note: Including performance bonuses related to progressing to Barcelona's first team. At the time it was agreed, the total fee would make it the most expensive transfer between two Spanish teams, the most expensive transfer into a non-top division team, and consequentially the most expensive transfer into the Primera Federación.)	348	2026	
44	(United States) Lindsey Horan	(United States) Portland Thorns	(France) Lyon	Midfielder	258	300 (Note: €250,000 with up to €50,000 in bonuses)	329	2023	
44	(Brazil) Geyse	(Spain) Barcelona	(England) Manchester United	Forward	256	300 (Note: Around €300,000 in fee and variables.)	326	2023	
44	(Brazil) Gabi Nunes	(Spain) Levante	(England) Aston Villa	Forward	250	300 (Note: Fee was player's release clause.)	333	2024	
44	(Nigeria) Gift Monday ‡	(Spain) Tenerife	(United States) Washington Spirit	Forward	250	300 (Note: Reported fee of €300,000 noted as above the player's €200,000 release clause.)	324	2025	
50	(Mexico) Scarlett Camberos †	(Mexico) América	(United States) Angel City	Forward	250+ (Note: The transfer of Camberos was the fifth-highest in 2023, behind Geyse in fourth and above Bethany England.)	285+	308+	2023	

=== Most expensive player by confederation ===
Confederation	Player	From	To	Position	Transfer fee			Year	Ref.
Confederation	Player	From	To	Position	£ thousand	€ thousand	$ thousand	Year	Ref.
AFC	(Australia) Kyra Cooney-Cross	(Sweden) Hammarby IF	(England) Arsenal	Midfielder	301	350	373	2023	
CAF	(Zambia) Racheal Kundananji †	(Spain) Madrid CFF	(United States) Bay FC	Forward	685	805	862	2024	
CONCACAF	(United States) Alyssa Thompson	(United States) Angel City	(England) Chelsea	Forward	<1,430	<1,650	<1,923	2025	
CONMEBOL	(Brazil) Kerolin	(England) Manchester City	(Spain) Barcelona	Forward	1,280	1,500	1,700	2026	
OFC	(New Zealand) Macey Fraser †	(Australia) Wellington Phoenix	(United States) Utah Royals	Midfielder	>53	>61	>65	2024	
UEFA	(France) Grace Geyoro	(France) Paris Saint-Germain	(England) London City Lionesses	Midfielder	1,430	1,650	1,923	2025	

== History ==
=== Compensated transfers in the 20th century ===
Prior to women's football teams having oversight from football federations, compensation was still paid for some transfers. The first compensated transfer of a female footballer was of Molly Walker, from Lancaster Ladies to Dick, Kerr Ladies in 1918; Walker was offered expenses paid as well as payment in lieu for joining the team. In the 1970s, various teams in Italy, and Olímpico de Villaverde in Spain, offered a signing fee for some players; in 1973, Conchi Sánchez was paid P^{ts} 75,000 (approximately €300 at the time) to leave Villaverde and join Gamma 3 Padova in Italy, with Stade de Reims in France offering P^{ts} 1 million for Villaverde's Victoria Hernández a few weeks later. Padova paid transfer bonuses in 1973, for German players Christia Nusser and Monika Bardof, "that would be desired by male players of [Spain's] Tercera División, and some of Segunda."

=== Women's football transfer record ===
==== First records ====
The first transfer fee for a women's footballer known to be reported as a world record was the £200,000 ($310,000; €235,000) paid for Milene Domingues in 2002. As well as a world record, BBC Sport reported at the time that Domingues' transfer fee was "10 times the previous Spanish record for a female player", though did not specify this. In 2001, the largest women's team in Spain, Levante, acquired two players (Maider Castillo and Mar Prieto) from Torrejón for a reported large transfer fee of €3,000 (P^{ts} 500,000). At the time, there was little to no money in women's football due to the limited number of professional leagues, and financial news focused on player salaries; Domingues received greater attention for the reported record salary she was to receive, though she ended up never playing for Rayo Vallecano, the club that signed her, due to non-Spanish players being unable to play in the Spanish women's league at the time. However, Domingues was not signed for her playing qualities, instead being a popular figure as the personable wife of Ronaldo, and her record signing was made more for promotional reasons. She fulfilled promotional duties at Rayo while returning to play for her previous team, Fiammamonza, without salary.

This transfer sum was not overtaken until September 2020, when Pernille Harder was bought by Chelsea for £250,000 ($334,000; €280,000). When, almost a year prior to Harder's transfer, Sam Kerr had also moved to Chelsea, focus was still on her large salary. In beating the near 20-year record by her transfer, Harder said she hoped it would help start to show that women's football can also be a club business like men's football and receive more money.

Harder gave similar comments when her record was beaten two years later by Barcelona buying Keira Walsh from Manchester City for £400,000 ($457,000; €470,000) in September 2022. Walsh instead was coy, saying she did not think about the record much, that she wanted to play at the club and "it just so happens that's what they paid for [her]." The Athletic and BBC Sport wrote that Walsh's transfer "shifted the ecosystem", having a significant impact on the market of women's football, that it showed "even the top clubs are not immune to the risk of losing their best players to rivals who are now willing to spend". It marked exponential growth for the transfer market; spending in transfer windows had been growing, with the winter 2021–22 window setting a then-record for global transfers in one season at a total of around £364,000 ($488,000; €432,000). Walsh's fee alone in the summer 2022 window eclipsed this, with further high transfer fees being paid as a domino effect supplementing the season total.

==== Market growth ====
Walsh's transfer was predicated on the growing popularity of women's football and its players in England and Spain; after the fee showed the financial power of this growth in popularity, fees continued accelerating in such markets. In the next transfer window, Bethany England transferred (to Tottenham Hotspur from Chelsea) for a fee that equalled Harder's previous record. Following this and a slew of other six-figure transfer fees in England's Women's Super League (WSL) in 2023, some WSL managers criticised the rapid spending growth of the larger clubs; in September 2023, England's head of women's football, Baroness Sue Campbell, said that future limits on spending would be introduced.

Chelsea still made some large signings in January 2024, including buying forward Mayra Ramírez from Levante for what could have increased to a new world record fee of £426,000 ($544,000; €500,000) with bonuses. (Note: See list note.) The club in particular were seeking a striker, and players in this position were in high demand across Europe at the time. Only weeks later, this fee was considerably beaten by another striker transferring out of the Liga F, when NWSL side Bay FC triggered the release clause of Madrid CFF's Racheal Kundananji to pay what would total £685,000 ($862,000; €805,000). Kundananji's record transfer fee came less than 18 months after Walsh's record, and was a 71% increase on it, which The Independent said demonstrated how significantly women's transfers had escalated in that period. The period of rapid financial growth was considered positive, as a sign of development in women's football, but reports continued to warn about pricing out lower-table and less wealthy clubs, and of clubs not investing in other improvements while spending on players.

==== Reaching 1 million ====
With the growth of the women's transfer market and six-figure fees becoming more common, sports media began speculating how soon a club would surpass the 1 million barrier. Increased revenues since 2022 and a changing landscape of women's football – which saw clubs want to secure players with longer contracts and minimum-fee release clauses – also contributed to the continued growth in transfer fees. The market growth also rapidly raised the comparative market values for many players, with experts opining that previously set six-figure release clauses which had seemed unachievable were, by 2024, significantly undervaluing players, contributing to many being bought for those fees. In summer 2024, Chelsea and Arsenal both made seven-figure offers in Euros for Barcelona players (Aitana Bonmatí and Walsh respectively), with both declined. The 1 million mark was achieved in January 2025, when Chelsea bought American defender Naomi Girma from San Diego Wave FC for $1.1 million (£883,000; €1.05 million). While the impact of the NWSL's spending power had been noted, pundits had predicted it would be a player from the Liga F to reach the milestone first. Tom Garry also wrote that Girma's fee "could already have been comfortably smashed for a winger or a No 9".

The first transfer fee to exceed 1 million in all main currencies was that of Olivia Smith, when Arsenal bought her from Liverpool in July 2025 for £1 million (€1.16 million; $1.36 million); Liverpool had rejected multiple other fee offers for Smith, for whom they had paid around £200,000 the previous summer.

=== Record progression ===
Year	Player	Selling club	Buying club	Fee (£)
2001	(Spain) Maider Castillo (Spain) Mar Prieto	(Spain) Torrejón	(Spain) Levante	1,875 (Note: €3,000 at 3 September 2001 exchange rate of 0.6242. Castillo was reportedly the player Levante had been set on acquiring. When Mapi León joined Barcelona in 2017, it was reported as the first paid transfer between Spanish clubs.)
2002	(Brazil) Milene Domingues	(Italy) Fiammamonza	(Spain) Rayo Vallecano	200,000
2020	(Denmark) Pernille Harder	(Germany) VfL Wolfsburg	(England) Chelsea	250,000
2022	(England) Keira Walsh	(England) Manchester City	(Spain) Barcelona	400,000
2024	(Zambia) Racheal Kundananji	(Spain) Madrid CFF	(United States) Bay FC	685,000
2025	(United States) Naomi Girma	(United States) San Diego Wave	(England) Chelsea	883,000
2025	(Canada) Olivia Smith	(England) Liverpool	(England) Arsenal	1 million
2025	(Mexico) Lizbeth Ovalle	(Mexico) Tigres UANL	(United States) Orlando Pride	1.1 million
2025	(France) Grace Geyoro	(France) Paris Saint-Germain	(England) London City Lionesses	1.4 million

== NWSL trades ==
The American National Women's Soccer League (NWSL) has a single-entity structure that resembles Major League Soccer and, prior to August 2024, had transaction rules that differed significantly from other global leagues. There are still various differences, particularly that NWSL players are contracted to the league itself rather than the clubs to which the league has assigned them. Before the 2020 NWSL season, the league introduced allocation money, a cash-equivalent credit that clubs can purchase from the league. Allocation money can be used to exceed the league salary cap, fund club operations, or pay fee-involved loans and transfers for players outside of the league. Clubs can trade credits like other non-cash league assets. A significant number of players in the NWSL then began being traded for allocation money.

NWSL trades – including those for allocation money – have different principles economically than domestic transfers in other leagues: (Note: For these reasons, they are listed separately.) domestic loans and transfers in the NWSL do not require a change of contract, as players are employed by the league; allocation money trades can also involve non-cash assets with no equivalent monetary value (such as other players, international roster spots, and the right to initiate negotiations with a player who is not already under contract with the NWSL); and no real currency is exchanged between transfer clubs, as the allocation money is a credit managed by the NWSL itself.

The NWSL also limits the amount of allocation money a team can acquire in one season, though allows teams to retain purchased but unused allocation money credits in subsequent seasons. Additionally, teams have traded players for credits they would acquire in future seasons.

In January 2024, the NWSL announced that it would begin to phase out allocation money with the plan to stop using it altogether at the end of 2026, citing exponential financial growth in foreign leagues as the reason it considered allocation money obsolete. At the same time, the NWSL also implemented an intra-league transaction fee system, a net transfer fee threshold of $500,000 for both intra- and inter-league transfers, and an additional 25-percent salary cap charge against net transfer fees exceeding $500,000. In August 2024, with the aim to attract more foreign players to the NWSL following the 2023 FIFA Women's World Cup, further changes were made to bring the holistic elements of NWSL trades more in-line with global standards: principally that trades require player consent; contracts must be guaranteed; and players will become free agents upon the expiry of any contract. The NWSL Draft was also abolished.

=== Largest cash-equivalent trades ===
The largest allocation-money involved transaction was for forward María Sánchez, who requested a trade for personal reasons communicated to her club, Houston Dash, shortly after it gave her the most expensive NWSL contract; the club obliged and traded her to San Diego Wave in exchange for an overall $500,000 in cash-equivalent credits, plus two years of international roster slots, in April 2024.

This list only includes transactions involving more than $150,000. Fees are in thousands.

As of 20 June 2026

Fee broke the NWSL record for a cash-equivalent domestic player trade at the time

Rank	Player or asset	From	To	Position	Cash equivalents and assets traded		Year	Ref(s).
Rank	Player or asset	From	To	Position	Cash eq. ($ thousand)	Other assets	Year	Ref(s).
1	(United States) Jaedyn Shaw	NC Courage	Gotham	Forward	1,250 (Note: Intra-league transfer funds)	None	2025	
2	(United States) Claire Hutton	KC Current	Bay FC	Forward	1,100	None	2026	
2	(United States) Yazmeen Ryan; (United States) Delanie Sheehan; $150,000 allocation money	Houston Dash	Denver Summit	Forward; Midfielder	1,100 (Note: $800,000 intra-league transfer funds, $200,000 expansion allocation funds, plus up to $100,000 conditional transfer funds)	Percentage of future sale	2026	
4	(Brazil) Ludmila	Chicago Stars	San Diego Wave	Forward	1,000 (Note: $800,000 in intraleague transfer funds and up to $200,000 in conditional transfer fees)	None	2026	
4	(United States) Croix Bethune	Washington Spirit	KC Current	Midfielder	1,000 (Note: $900,000 intra-league transfer funds and $100,000 allocation money)	None	2026	
6	(United States) Ally Sentnor	KC Current	Angel City	Forward	850	None	2026	
7	(United States) Ally Sentnor	Utah Royals	KC Current	Forward	800 (Note: In transfer funds, including $100,000 if performance benchmarks met)	Percentage of future sale	2025	
8	(United States) Emily Sams	Orlando Pride	Angel City	Defender	650	None	2026	
9	(United States) Kennedy Fuller; 2026 international roster spot	Angel City	Bay FC	Midfielder	520 (Note: $500,000 intra-league transfer funds and $20,000 allocation money)	None	2026	
10	(Mexico) María Sánchez	Houston Dash	San Diego Wave	Forward	500 (Note: $300,000 in intra-league transfer funds and $200,000 in allocation money)	2024 international roster slot; 2025 international roster slot	2024	
10	(Canada) Jordyn Huitema	Seattle Reign	Chicago Stars	Forward	500	None	2026	
12	(United States) Jaedyn Shaw	San Diego Wave	NC Courage	Forward	450 (Note: $300 allocation money and $150,000 intra-league transfer funds)	2025 international roster slot; 2026 international roster slot	2025	
13	(United States) Yazmeen Ryan	Gotham	Houston Dash	Forward	400	2025 international roster spot	2024	
13	(United States) Lilly Reale	Gotham	Boston Legacy	Defender	400 (Note: $350,000 allocation money and $50,000 transfer funds)	None	2026	
15	2nd pick in 2023 NWSL Draft	Orlando Pride	Gotham	N/A	350	4th-round pick in 2024 NWSL Draft	2023	
15	(United States) Penelope Hocking	Chicago Red Stars	Bay FC	Forward	350	10% of fee from future sale of Hocking	2024	
15	(United States) Penelope Hocking	Bay FC	KC Current	Forward	350	None	2026	
18	(United States) Alex Morgan	Orlando Pride	San Diego Wave	Forward	275	NWSL rights to Angharad James	2021	
18	(Costa Rica) Rocky Rodríguez	Portland Thorns	Angel City	Midfielder	275	Plus "additional conditional funds to be paid against the transfer fee threshold"	2024	
20	(United States) Crystal Dunn	OL Reign	Portland Thorns	Midfielder	250 (Note: $200,000 in allocation money, with an additional $50,000 contingent on Dunn's future NWSL playing status)	2021 international roster slot; 1st-round pick in the 2022 NWSL Draft	2020	
20	1st pick in 2023 NWSL Draft	Gotham	Angel City	N/A	250	NWSL rights to Yazmeen Ryan	2023	
20	(United States) Ashley Sanchez	Washington Spirit	NC Courage	Midfielder	250	1st-round (5th overall) pick in the 2024 NWSL Draft	2024	
23	15th pick in 2024 NWSL Draft; Immunity from Bay FC in 2024 NWSL Expansion Draft	Bay FC	Racing Louisville	N/A	235 (Note: The cash asset was alternative allocation money, allowing the club to use allocation money above the league's season cap. This was the first trade to involve alternative allocation money.)	3rd-round (34th overall) pick in 2024 NWSL Draft	2023	
24	(United States) Rose Lavelle	Washington Spirit	OL Reign	Midfielder	200 (Note: $100,000 payable at the time of the trade in August 2020, and an additional $100,000 payable when Lavelle rejoined the NWSL from Manchester City, which she did in May 2021.)	1st-round pick in 2022 NWSL Draft	2020	
24	(United States) Kristie Mewis	San Diego Wave	Gotham	Midfielder	200	None	2021	
24	(United States) Lynn Williams	NC Courage	KC Current	Forward	200	NWSL rights to Katelyn Rowland; 1st-round pick in 2023 NWSL Draft	2022	
24	(Canada) Victoria Pickett	KC Current	Gotham	Midfielder	200	Gotham's second-highest 1st-round pick in 2023 NWSL Draft	2022	
24	(United States) Yazmeen Ryan	Portland Thorns	Angel City	Forward	200	1st-round pick in 2023 NWSL Draft; 2nd-round pick in 2024 NWSL Draft	2023	
24	(Canada) Victoria Pickett	Gotham	NC Courage	Midfielder	200	None	2023	
30	(United States) Abby Dahlkemper	NC Courage	San Diego Wave	Defender	190	1st-round pick in 2023 NWSL Draft	2021	
30	(England) Ebony Salmon	Racing Louisville	Houston Dash	Forward	190 (Note: $150,000 of 2022 allocation money, $25,000 of 2023 allocation money, and $15,000 in performance-based conditions.)	None	2022	
32	(Japan) Narumi Miura	Washington Spirit	Utah Royals	Midfielder	180 (Note: In allocation money)	None	2026	
33	4th pick in 2021 NWSL Draft	Sky Blue	Kansas City	N/A	175	None	2021	
33	(United States) Cece Kizer; (United States) Addisyn Merrick	Racing Louisville	KC Current	Forward; Defender	175 (Note: $150,000 in allocation money, and $25,000 in additional allocation money contingent on Kizer reaching performance-based goals.)	2022 international roster spot; 2023 international roster spot	2022	
33	(United States) Alex Loera	KC Current	Bay FC	Defender	175	Immunity from Bay FC in 2024 NWSL Expansion Draft	2023	
33	10th pick in 2024 NWSL Draft	NC Courage	Chicago Red Stars	N/A	175	None	2024	
33	(United States) Savannah McCaskill	San Diego Wave	Gotham	Midfielder	175	None	2026	
33	(Canada) Nichelle Prince; 2026 international roster spot	KC Current	Boston Legacy	Forward	175 (Note: $125,000 in allocation funds and $50,000 in intra-league transfer funds)	None	2026	
33	(Brazil) Gabi Portilho	Gotham	San Diego Wave	Forward	175	None	2026	
40	(Venezuela) Bárbara Olivieri	Houston Dash	Boston Legacy	Midfielder	165 (Note: Boston described the fee as "$50k in 2025 intra-league transfer funds, $50k in 2026 intra-league transfer funds, $35k in conditional intra-league transfer funds, and $30k in conditional expansion allocation money.")	None	2025	
41	(Canada) Janine Sonis (Janine Beckie)	Racing Louisville	Denver Summit	Forward	160 (Note: Initial $120,000 in intraleague transfer funds, in a deal with "performance conditions that could see that total rise to $160,000")	None	2026	
42	(United States) Becky Sauerbrunn	Utah Royals	Portland Thorns	Defender	150 (Note: $100,000 in allocation money, and $50,000 of additional allocation money if Sauerbrunn remained on the Thorns' squad in 2021.)	NWSL rights to Elizabeth Ball	2020	
42	(United States) Adrianna Franch	Portland Thorns	KC Current	Goalkeeper	150	NWSL rights to Abby Smith	2021	
42	(United States) Caprice Dydasco	Gotham	Houston Dash	Defender	150 (Note: $120,000 in allocation money, and $10,000 of additional allocation money for each postseason match Dydasco plays for Houston, up to a total of $150,000.)	None	2022	
42	(United States) Elyse Bennett; 23rd pick in 2023 NWSL Draft	KC Current	OL Reign	Forward	150	23rd pick in 2023 NWSL Draft	2023	
42	4th pick in 2023 NWSL Draft	Racing Louisville	Gotham	N/A	150	NWSL rights to Paige Monaghan; 2023 international roster spot	2023	
42	(United States) Mandy Haught	Gotham	Utah Royals	Goalkeeper	150	Immunity from Utah in 2024 NWSL Expansion Draft	2023	
42	(United States) Taylor Flint	San Diego Wave	Racing Louisville	Midfielder	150	None	2024	

== Spain Compensation List ==
Ahead of the 2020 season, Spain introduced the "Compensation List", part of a wider agreement between women's football clubs as a step towards professionalism; intended to compensate the expenses of youth training when young players joined senior clubs, the Compensation List ruled that players under the age of 23 could only transfer between Spanish clubs for a fee, even when their contract is expired. The club they were to leave would set an asking price, and if no other club was willing to pay (and the player did not move to a club outside of Spain), the original club had to re-sign the player with a salary increase matching a percentage of the asking price. There were criticisms of the Compensation List, as few clubs wanted to pay and it was seen to encourage young talents to leave the country.

Before the Compensation List was accepted, a lawsuit seeking to prevent it was brought by Spanish players' union Futbolistas ON, arguing that it should be invalid due to not having been negotiated within labour agreements and due to being used as a disguised retention fee. Though the Court approved the Compensation List, it upheld that clubs which had not taken part in its negotiation (Barcelona, Real Madrid, and Athletic Club) could not use the Compensation List, and that cases of "disproportion" should have individual appeals (based on European litigation involving French clubs). The highest fees set on the Compensation List were for Eva Navarro and Ona Batlle of Levante, each for €500,000, and Maite Oroz and Damaris Egurrola of Athletic Club, each for €250,000 – at the time the fees were set (ahead of the summer 2020 transfer window), all would have broken the world record. Oroz and Egurrola had already announced their plans to depart Athletic Club, and so the high fees were seen as punitive; Oroz had already signed for Real Madrid before the court case, with Real Madrid not wanting to pay the fee being one reason it was brought. As neither club was involved in negotiations, the fee was deemed invalid.

By the end of 2020, after Batlle left the country and Navarro had been without a club until returning to Levante against her wishes, Spanish clubs agreed to limit the fees set on the Compensation List in order to prevent abuse. The agreement that had created the List expired at the end of the season.

== Gallery ==
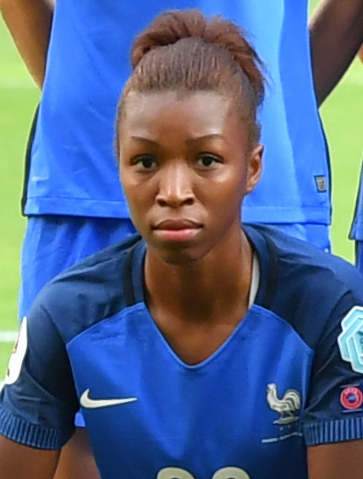
Grace Geyoro, the most expensive women's footballer and women's midfielder

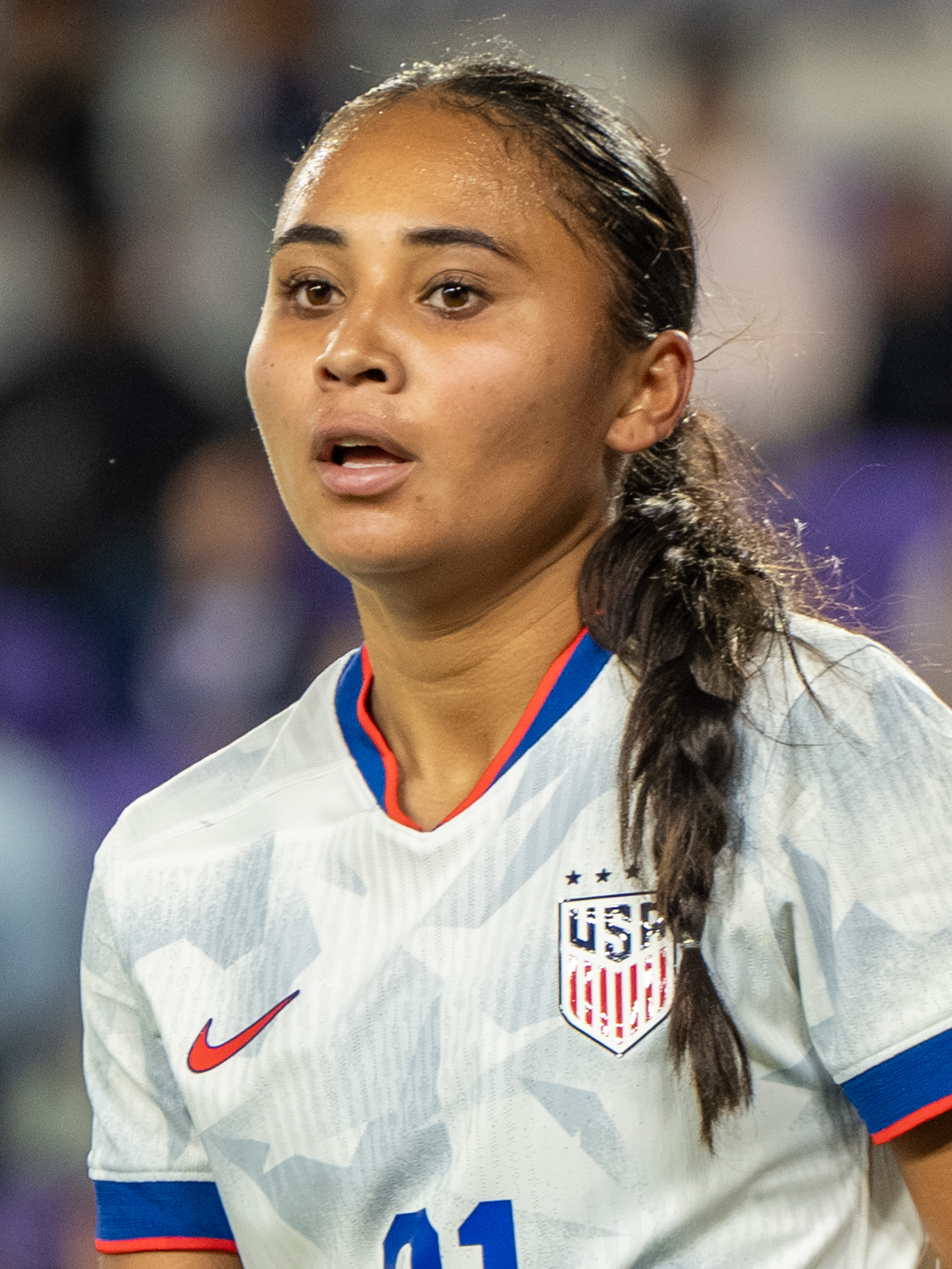
Alyssa Thompson, the most expensive women's forward

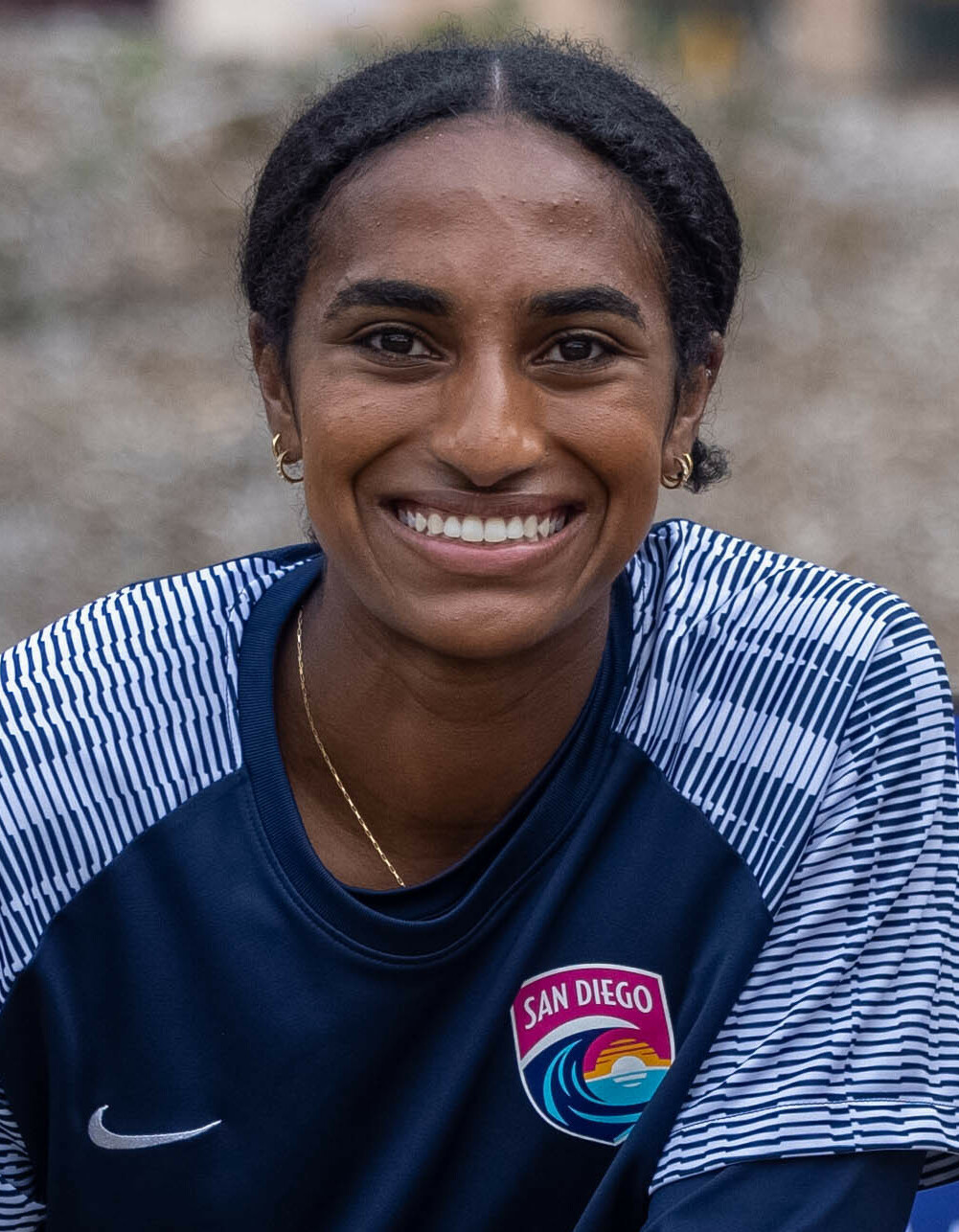
Naomi Girma, the most expensive women's defender

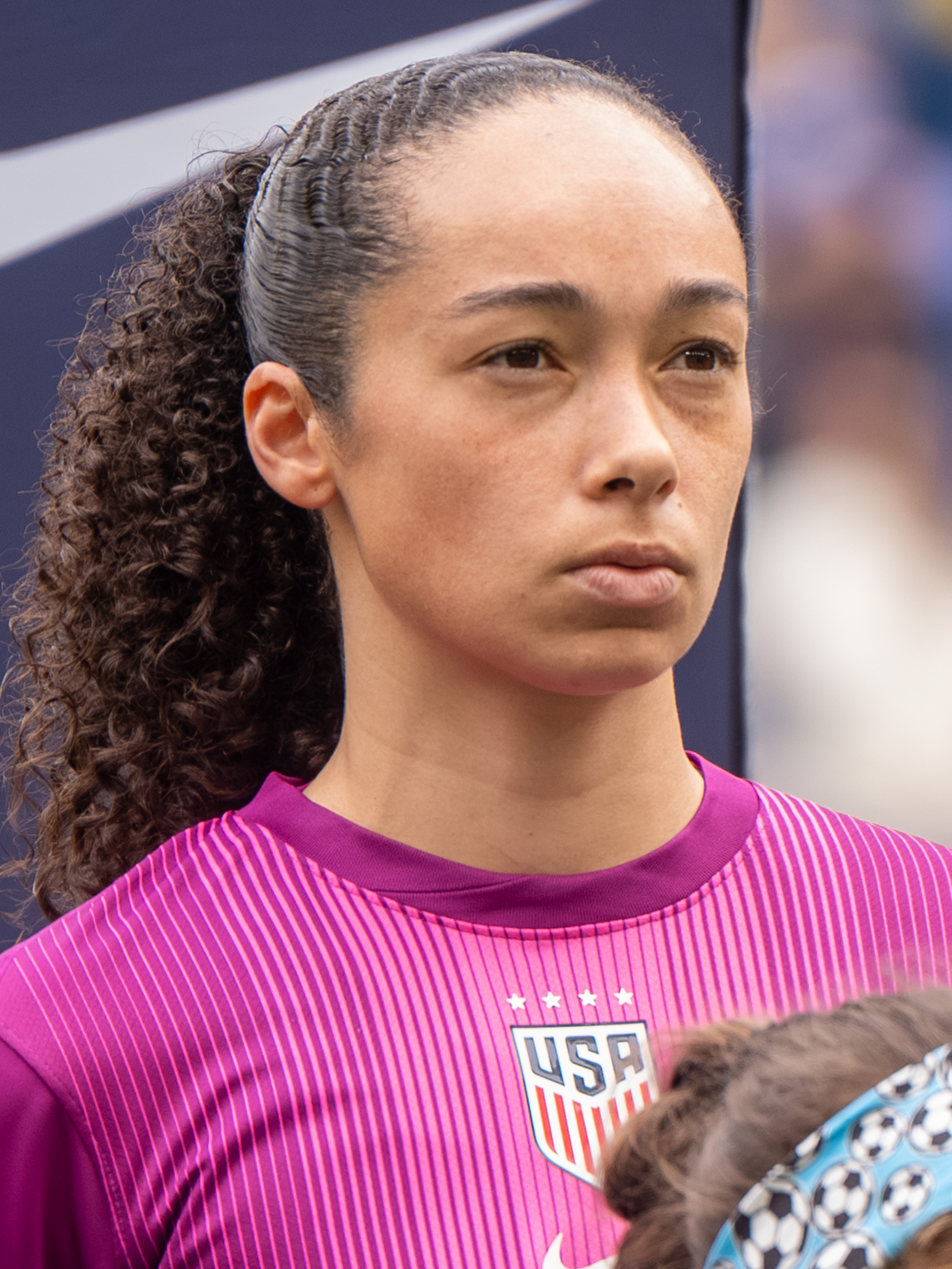
Phallon Tullis-Joyce, the most expensive women's goalkeeper

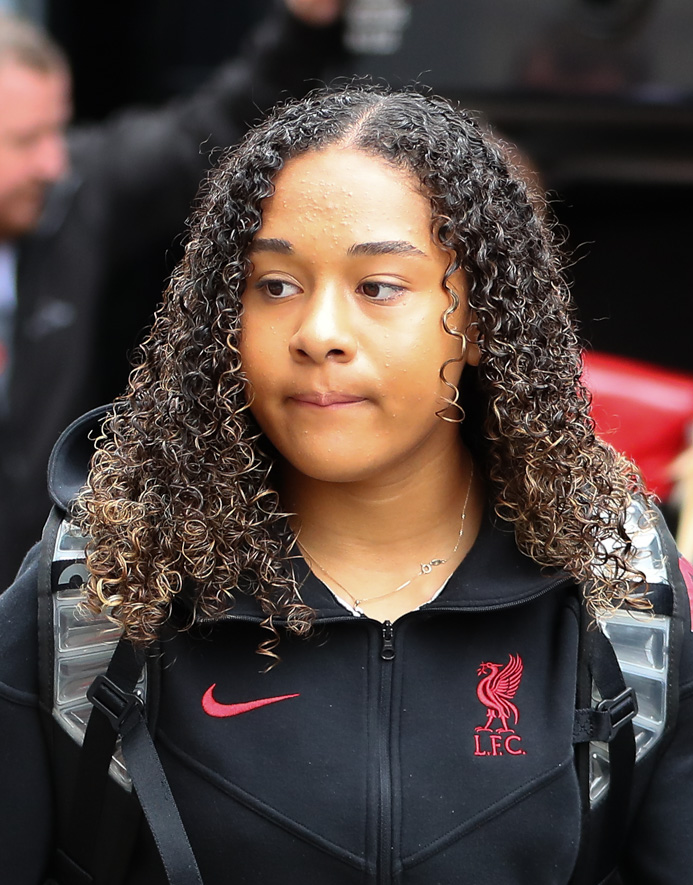
Olivia Smith, the most expensive women's footballer in a domestic transfer

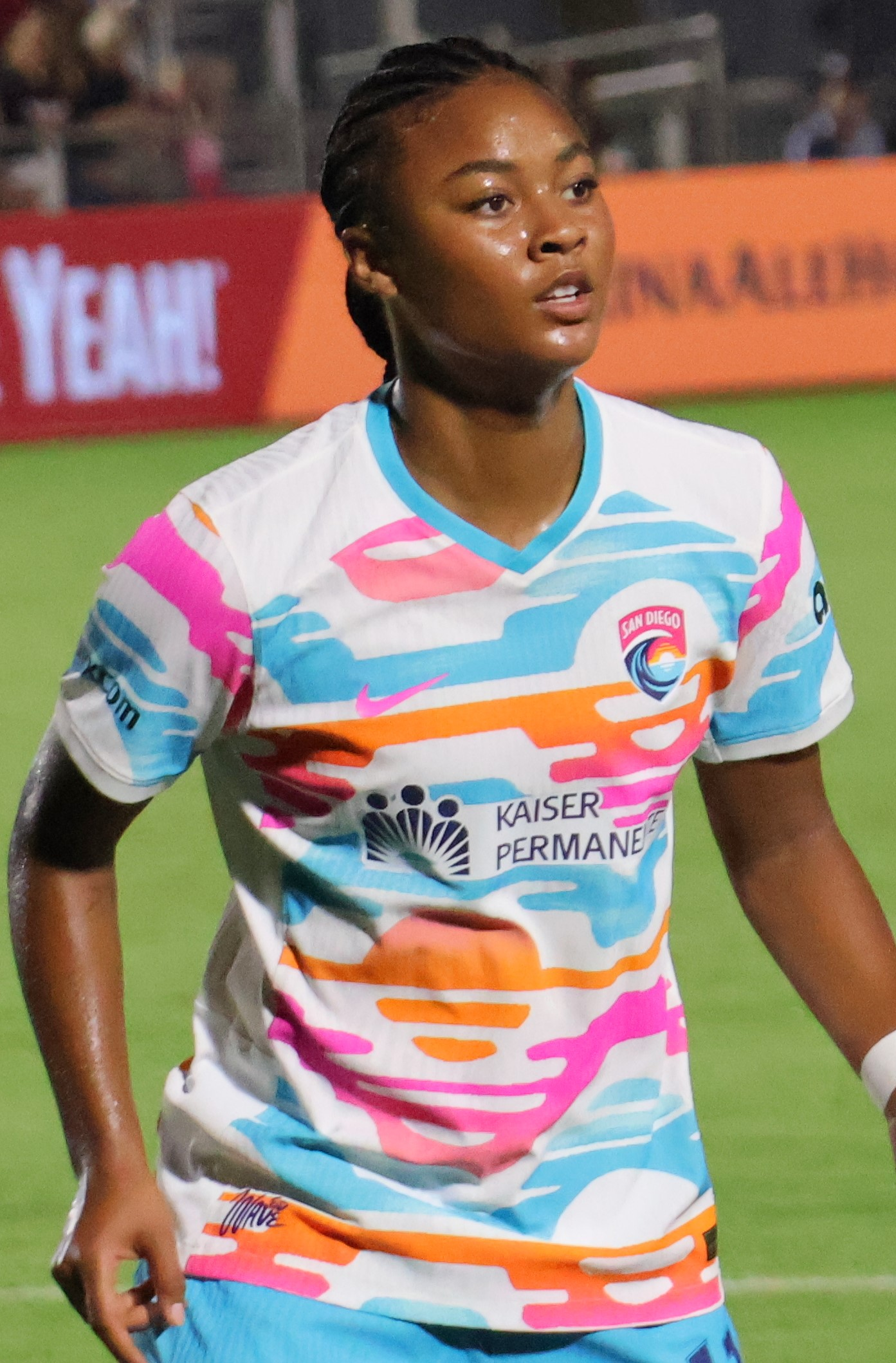
Jaedyn Shaw, the most expensive women's footballer in a domestic NWSL trade (cash equivalent value only)

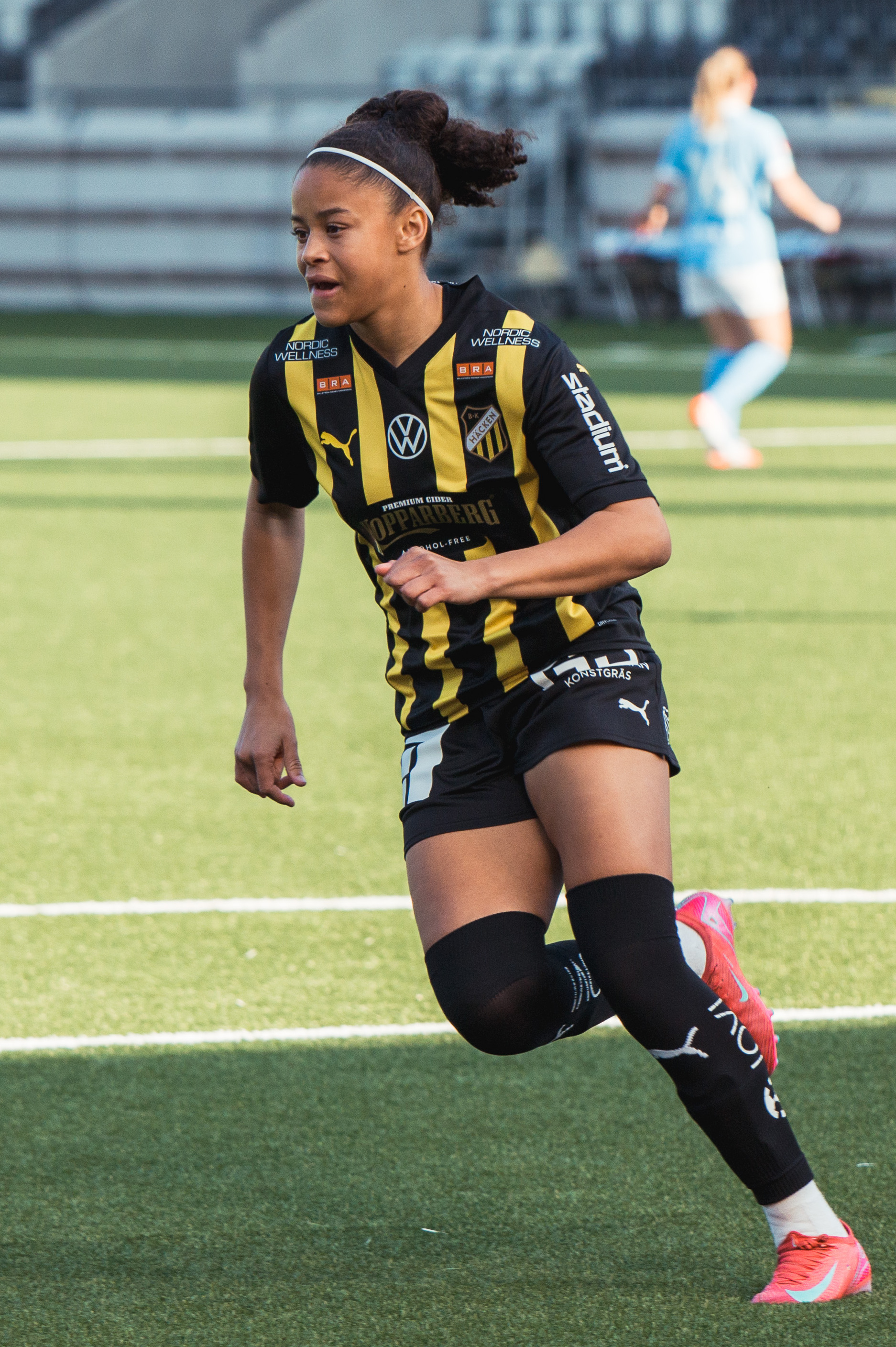
Felicia Schröder, the most expensive women's teenager

== See also ==
- Professionalism in women's association football
- List of world association football records
- List of most expensive association football transfers

== Notes ==
† In player transfers between the National Women's Soccer League (NWSL) and other leagues, the NWSL as a single-entity organization conducts the transaction and pays or receives any fees, rather than member clubs conducting the deal directly. NWSL clubs fund transactions by purchasing allocation money credits from the league, which can be traded between NWSL clubs or acquired from the league through non-financial means. Such transfers into the league are subject to FIFA transfer regulations. Once in the league, international players can be subject to different rules for domestic transfers within the NWSL.

‡ In player transfers between the National Women's Soccer League (NWSL) and other leagues after summer 2024, the NWSL as a single-entity organization conducts the transaction and pays or receives any fees, rather than member clubs conducting the deal directly. There are various ways for teams to purchase credits from the league. Such transfers into the league are subject to FIFA transfer regulations.
