= Keira Barry =

English footballer (born 2005)

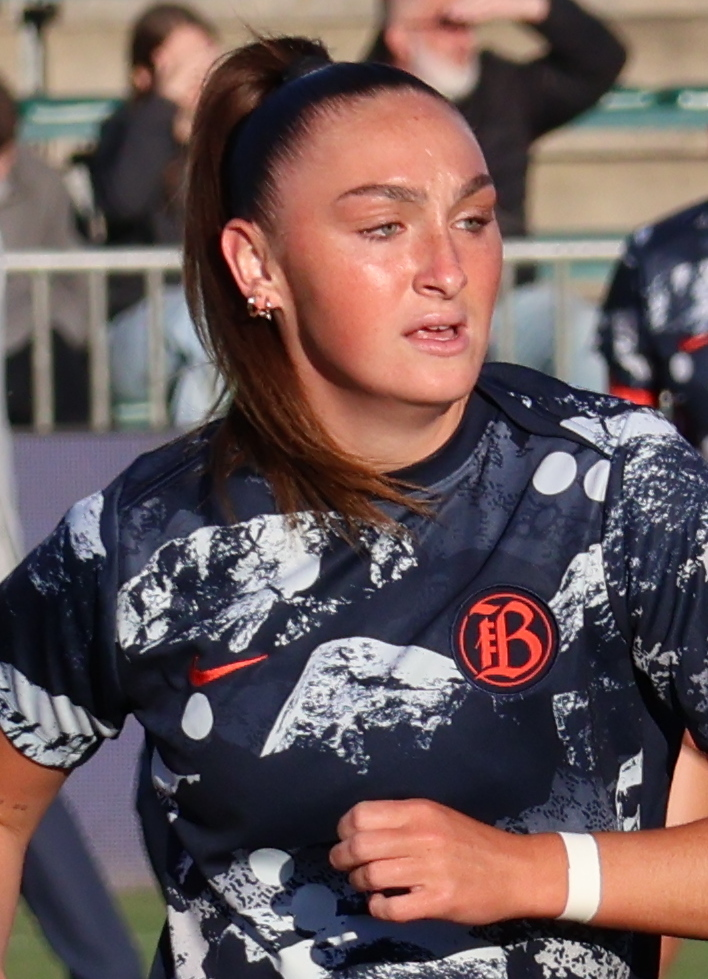
- Barry with Bay FC in 2026

Personal information
- Full name: Keira Kathleen Barry
- Date of birth: 13 June 2005 (age 21)
- Height: 1.75 m (5 ft 9 in)
- Position: Forward

Team information
- Current team: Bay FC
- Number: 27

Youth career
- Manchester United

Senior career*
Years	Team	Apps	(Gls)
2022–2026	Manchester United	0	(0)
2023	→ Derby County (dual reg)	10	(2)
2023–2024	→ Crystal Palace (loan)	0	(0)
2025	→ Sunderland (loan)	8	(1)
2026–	Bay FC	22	(2)

International career^{‡}
2021–2011	England U17	5	(1)
2022	England U19	3	(1)
2025	England U23	4	(2)
- * Club domestic league appearances and goals as of 05:10, 2 November 2026 (UTC) ‡ National team caps and goals as of 16:32, 7 February 2026 (UTC)

Keira Kathleen Barry (born 13 June 2005) is an English professional footballer who plays as a forward for Bay FC of the National Women's Soccer League (NWSL). She has previously played for Manchester United and represented England at multiple youth international levels.

== Youth career ==
Barry joined Manchester United's youth academy at the age of 10. In 2022, she was part of Manchester United's under-21 team that won both a league and cup title; Barry herself scored in the team's cup final victory over Birmingham City.

== Club career ==
=== Manchester United ===
In December 2022, Barry made her senior debut, coming on as a substitute in a Women's League Cup victory against Sheffield United. She went on to spend much of the 2022–23 season on a dual registration agreement with FA Women's National League side Derby County. However, she sustained an injury in March 2023 that sidelined her for the later portion of the season.

In August 2023, Barry signed her first professional contract for Manchester United. She subsequently went on loan to second-division team Crystal Palace. On 10 December 2023, Barry made her Crystal Palace debut, coming on as a 60th-minute substitute for Araya Dennis in a 6–0 Women's FA Cup victory over Chatham Town. She scored her first senior goal 11 minutes into the match before leaving the game due to an injury. Barry would continue to struggle with fitness throughout her spell at Crystal Palace. She ultimately did not make any further appearances and was forced to watch from the sidelines as the team won the Women's Championship, gaining promotion to the Women's Super League for the following campaign.

On 23 June 2025, Barry penned a one-year contract extension with Manchester United. In September 2025, the club announced that Barry had been loaned out again, this time to Sunderland through the end of the year. On 14 December, Barry scored a brace in the FA Cup third round, helping Sunderland beat Barry's former team, Derby County. She totaled 11 appearances and 3 goals across all competitions before returning to her parent club in January 2026.

Upon her departure from Manchester United, Barry had spent a total of ten years in the club's system. She had only managed to make two senior appearances, neither of which occurred in the Women's Super League.

=== Bay FC ===
In search of a new experience and more first-team minutes, Barry began searching for a club after her loan with Sunderland expired. She reportedly fielded offers from English clubs Liverpool, Aston Villa, Bristol City, and Nottingham Forest. Ultimately, she chose to join American National Women's Soccer League team Bay FC, a move that reunited her with former England youth national team head coach Emma Coates. Barry was officially announced at Bay FC on 4 February 2026, signing a four-year contract with the club. She made her NWSL debut on 14 March 2026, coming on as a second-half substitute for Karlie Lema in Bay FC's season-opening victory over expansion team Denver Summit FC. On 29 March, she scored her first NWSL goal, helping Bay FC beat the North Carolina Courage, 3–1.

== International career ==
Barry has been called up by the England under-19 national team and has scored one goal in her lone year of U19 experience. She has also received minutes with the under-23 squad and was named England's player of the match in a 4–2 loss to the United States in December 2025.

On 7 April 2026, Barry received her first call-up to the England senior national team, joining the squad as a replacement for the injured Freya Godfrey ahead of a set of 2027 FIFA Women's World Cup qualifiers against Spain and Iceland.
