= Agostina Holzheier =

Argentine footballer (born 2003)

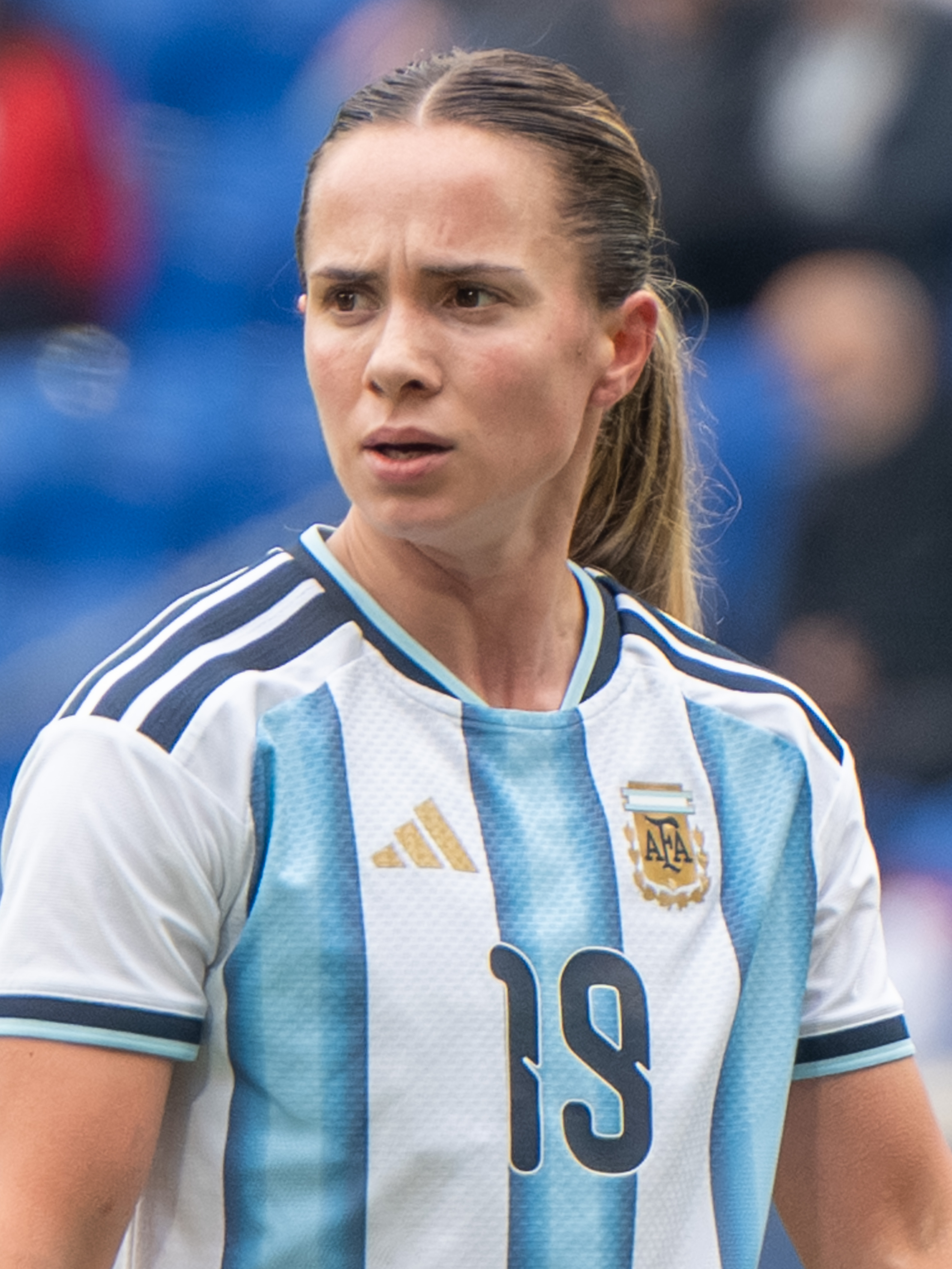
- Holzheier with Argentina in 2026

Personal information
- Date of birth: 30 September 2003 (age 23)
- Place of birth: Crespo, Entre Ríos, Argentina
- Positions: Winger; striker

Team information
- Current team: Bay FC
- Number: 30

Senior career*
Years	Team	Apps	(Gls)
2016–2021	Unión de Crespo		
2021–2023	River	3	(3)
2023	Grêmio	6	(1)
2023–2026	Racing Club	77	(27)
2026–	Bay FC	9	(0)

International career^{‡}
2018	Argentina U17	1	(0)
2022	Argentina U20	3	(0)
2021–	Argentina	24	(3)
Medal record
Women's football
Representing Argentina
Copa América Femenina
Bronze medal – third place	2025 Ecuador
- * Club domestic league appearances and goals as of 05:10, 2 November 2026 (UTC) ‡ National team caps and goals as of 18 April 2026

Agostina Holzheier (born 30 September 2003) is an Argentine professional footballer who plays as a striker or winger for Bay FC of the National Women's Soccer League (NWSL) and the Argentina national team.

== Early life ==
Holzheier was born 30 September 2003 and started playing football at the age of four.

== Career ==
In 2021, Holzheier signed for Argentine side River, helping the club win the 2022 Copa Federal. She was regarded as a top Argentine prospect.

On 31 July 2026, Holzheier moved to the United States and joined National Women's Soccer League (NWSL) club Bay FC, signing a three-and-a-half-year deal with the option for another year.

== Personal life ==
Holzheier has three siblings.

== Career statistics ==
=== International ===
As of match played 14 April 2026

Appearances and goals by national team and year
National team	Year	Apps	Goals
Argentina	2021	1	0
Argentina	2022	1	0
Argentina	2023	5	0
Argentina	2024	2	0
Argentina	2025	10	2
Argentina	2026	5	1
Total		24	3

=== International goals ===
Scores and results list Argentina's goal tally first

No.	Date	Venue	Opponent	Score	Result	Competition
1.	22 February 2025	Estadio Bicentenario de La Florida, La Florida, Chile	Chile	3–0	3–0	Friendly
2.	24 October 2025	Estadio Diego Armando Maradona, Buenos Aires, Argentina	Paraguay	3–1	3–1	2025–26 CONMEBOL Women's Nations League
3.	14 April 2026	Estadio Metropolitano de Cabudare, Cabudare, Venezuela	Venezuela	1–0	2–1	2025–26 CONMEBOL Women's Nations League
