= Sydney Collins =

Canadian soccer player (born 1999)

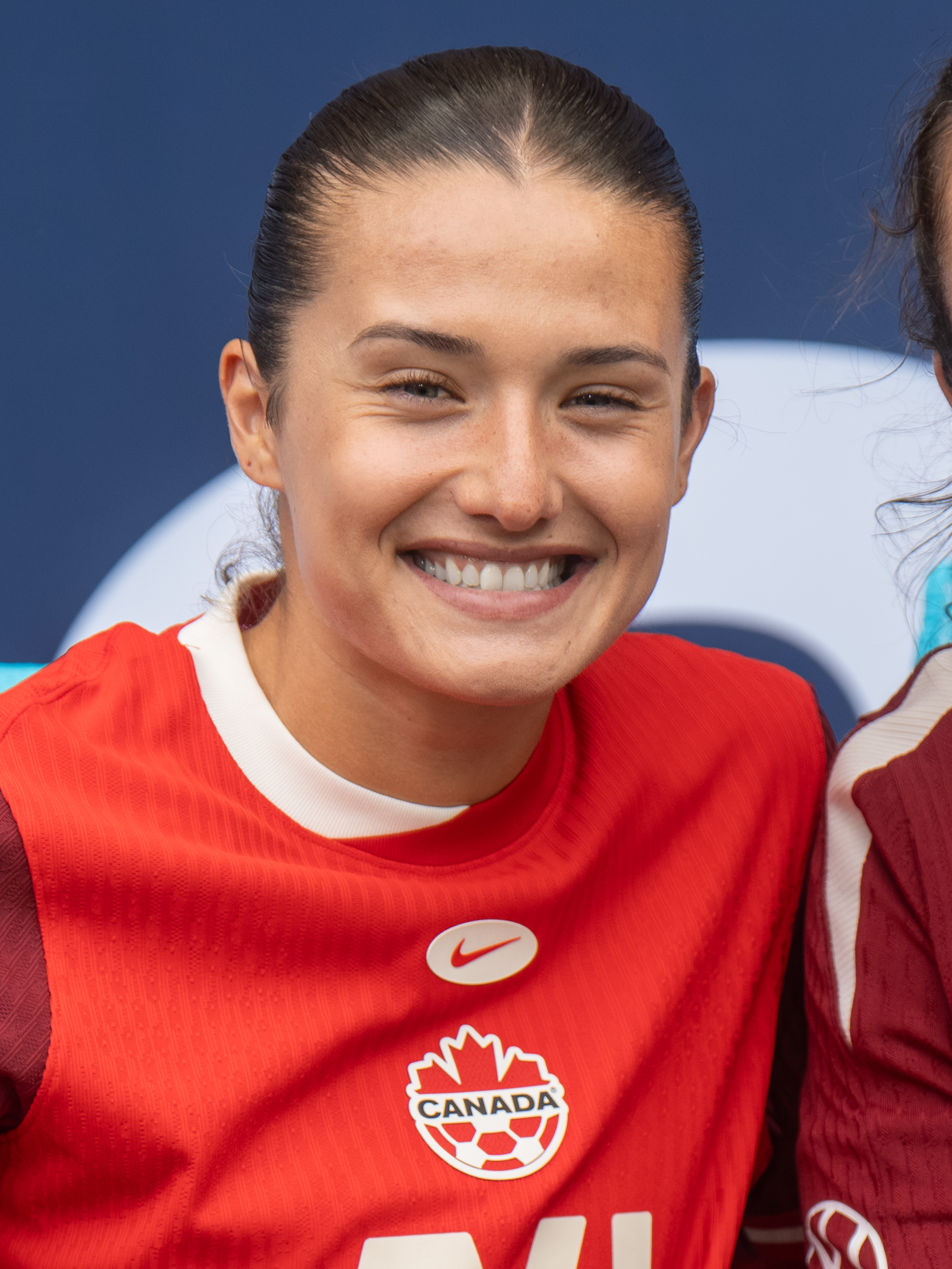
- Collins in 2026

Personal information
- Full name: Sydney Jane Collins
- Date of birth: September 8, 1999 (age 27)
- Place of birth: Hillsboro, Oregon, United States
- Height: 5 ft 8 in (1.73 m)
- Position: Defender

Team information
- Current team: Bay FC
- Number: 16

Youth career
- Hillsboro SC
- FC Portland Soccer Academy
- 2017–2018: Portland Thorns

College career
Years	Team	Apps	(Gls)
2018–2022	California Golden Bears	85	(1)

Senior career*
Years	Team	Apps	(Gls)
2023–2025	North Carolina Courage	4	(0)
2025–	Bay FC	37	(0)

International career^{‡}
2022	United States U23		
2023–	Canada	16	(1)
- * Club domestic league appearances and goals as of 05:02, November 2, 2026 (UTC) ‡ National team caps and goals as of October 12, 2026

Sydney Jane Collins (born September 8, 1999) is a professional soccer player who plays as a defender for Bay FC of the National Women's Soccer League (NWSL). Born in the United States, she plays for the Canada national team. She played college soccer for the California Golden Bears and was drafted by the North Carolina Courage in the first round of the 2023 NWSL Draft.

== Early life ==
Collins began playing soccer at age eight with Hillsboro SC. She later played for the FC Portland Soccer Academy and the Portland Thorns Development Academy.

She attended Jesuit High School in Oregon, where she was a four-year starter on the varsity soccer team, serving as team captain for her final two years. She was a two-time state champion in 2015 and 2017, a two-time First Team All-State, voted to the TopDrawerSoccer Best XI for the High School Girls All-American Game, and was a 2017 United Soccer Coaches All-Region Team. She was also named the 2017-18 Oregon Girls Soccer Player of the Year.

== College career ==
In 2018, she began attending the University of California, Berkeley, where she played for the women's soccer team. In her sophomore season in 2019, she was named a Pac-12 Academic Honor Roll Selection and CoSIDA Academic District 8 First Team Honoree. In her junior season, she was named team captain, and was named to the Pac-12 Academic Honor Roll once again. She also scored her first collegiate goal on March 5, 2021, against the Colorado Buffaloes. In her senior season, she was named to the Third Team All-Pac-12, the CoSIDA Academic All-District Second Team and the Pac-12 Academic Honor Roll. In 2022, she was named Pac-12 Defender of the Week for two consecutive weeks. She was also an Academic All-District Team for the third time, was named to the All-Pacific Region Second Team, and the All-Pac-12 Second Team.

== Club career ==
=== North Carolina Courage ===
Collins was selected by the North Carolina Courage in the first round (8th overall) of the 2023 NWSL Draft. She signed a three-year contract with the club. She made her professional debut on April 1, 2023, playing nine minutes in a 3–1 loss to the San Diego Wave. She played in 10 games, with two starts, in all competitions during her rookie season with the Courage.

Collins missed the entire 2024 season after sustaining fractures in both legs months apart while training with Canada. In July 2025, she returned to the active roster and played for the first time in over a year in the Courage's friendly against Guadalajara.

=== Bay FC ===
On August 22, 2025, Bay FC acquired Collins by trading $60,000 in intra-league transfer funds to the Courage, signing her through the 2027 season. Collins made her debut on September 1, 2025, coming on as a halftime substitute for Kelli Hubly in a 2–1 loss to Angel City FC.

== International career ==
Collins was eligible to play for the United States (where she and her father were born) and Canada (where her mother was born). In April 2016, she was called up to a camp with the United States U17 team. In February 2022, she played with the United States U23 team at the Portland Thorns Preseason Tournament, where they faced professional teams from the NWSL.

In February 2023, Collins joined the Canada women's team as a training player for the 2023 SheBelieves Cup. She was then subsequently named to the roster in April for a friendly against France, making her debut on April 11.

After not making the Canadian roster for the 2023 FIFA Women's World Cup, where the team would go on to suffer a disappointing group stage exit, Collins was called up for the team's next fixtures in September, a two-leg CONCACAF Olympic qualification playoff against Jamaica. Following training camp, she said "I think we have a really good energy about the group coming together and trying to move forward." Despite having only played fourteen minutes in her lone prior international appearance, with Canada seeking to reorganize following the World Cup, coach Bev Priestman opted to start Collins in the first match, citing her strong camp performance. This was widely cited as a "surprise" move, but Collins' performance was generally assessed positively, and she ultimately started both matches, which saw Canada defeat Jamaica and qualify for the 2024 Summer Olympics. She was originally named to the squad for the Olympics, but was forced to withdraw after suffering a fractured leg in a warmup match ahead of the tournament.

Collins made her return from injury to the national team in October 2025, being called up for a camp in Europe with friendly matches against Switzerland and the Netherlands.

Collins scored her first goal for Canada on March 1, 2026, scoring a header in a 4–1 win against Colombia in the 2026 SheBelieves Cup.

== Personal life ==
Collins is the daughter of former National Football League and Canadian Football League player Brett Collins.

== Career statistics ==
=== Club ===
As of November 2, 2026

Appearances and goals by club, season and competition
Club	Season	League			Cup		Playoffs (Note: Includes NWSL playoffs)		Total	
Club	Season	Division	Apps	Goals	Apps	Goals	Apps	Goals	Apps	Goals
North Carolina Courage	2023	NWSL	4	0	6	0	0	0	10	0
North Carolina Courage	2024	NWSL	0	0	—		0	0	0	0
North Carolina Courage	2025	NWSL	0	0	—		—		0	0
North Carolina Courage	Total		4	0	6	0	0	0	10	0
Bay FC	2025	NWSL	9	0	—		—		9	0
Bay FC	2026	NWSL	28	0	—		—		28	0
Bay FC	Total		37	0	0	0	0	0	37	0
Career total			41	0	6	0	0	0	47	0

=== International goals ===
As of March 1, 2026

No.	Date	Venue	Opponent	Score	Result	Competition
1.	March 1, 2026	Geodis Park, Nashville, United States	Colombia	3–0	4–1	2026 SheBelieves Cup
