= Camryn Miller =

American soccer player (born 2002)

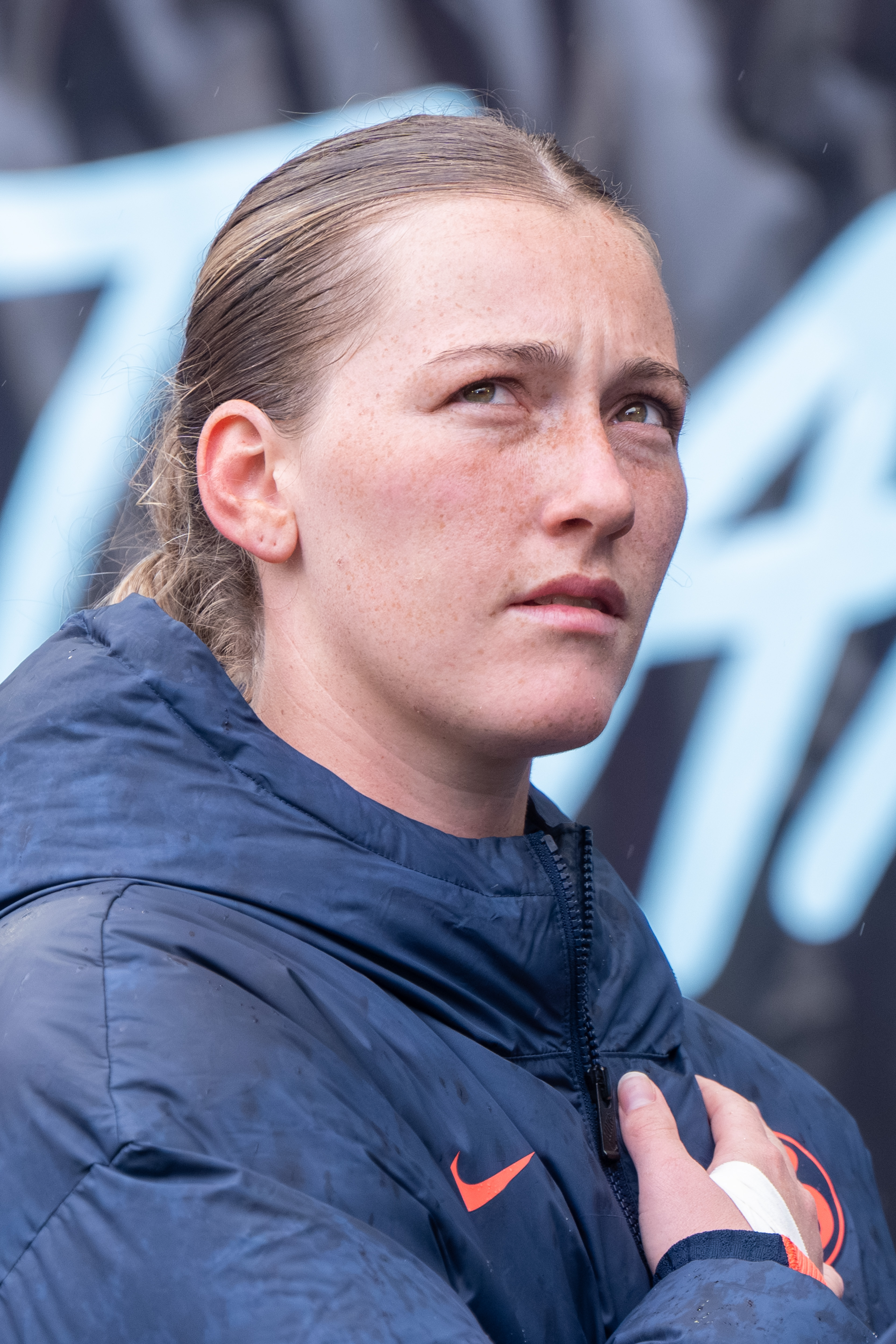
- Miller with Bay FC in 2026

Personal information
- Date of birth: August 7, 2002 (age 24)
- Place of birth: Glen Allen, Virginia, U.S.
- Height: 5 ft 9 in (1.75 m)
- Position: Goalkeeper

Youth career
- Richmond United

College career
| Years | Team | Apps | (Gls) |
| 2021–2024 | Virginia Cavaliers | 4 | (0) |
| 2025 | Cincinnati Bearcats | 19 | (0) |

Senior career*
| Years | Team | Apps | (Gls) |
| 2026 | Bay FC | 0 | (0) |
- * Club domestic league appearances and goals as of August 1, 2026

Camryn Miller (born August 7, 2002) is an American professional soccer player who plays as a goalkeeper She played college soccer for the Virginia Cavaliers and the Cincinnati Bearcats.

== Early life ==
Miller grew up in Glen Allen, Virginia, where she attended Deep Run High School. She played club soccer for Richmond United, serving as team captain during the 2018–19 season. She also played for the school's soccer team, where she was named the 2021 Regional Player of the Year, earned first-team All-Region honors, and served as team captain during her senior season. Miller was also named the team's Most Valuable Player in 2021, received the Coach's Award in 2019, and was a four-year letter winner.

== College career ==
Miller played college soccer for the Virginia Cavaliers from 2021 to 2024 and the Cincinnati Bearcats in 2025. She redshirted as a freshman in 2021 and did not appear in any matches. In 2022, she again did not make an appearance but was named to the 2022–23 ACC Academic Honor Roll. Miller made her collegiate debut in 2023, appearing in one match, and was named to the 2023–24 ACC Academic Honor Roll.

In 2024, Miller appeared in three matches, including one start. She made her first collegiate start against the Howard Bison and recorded her first career save against the NC State Wolfpack. She transferred to the Cincinnati Bearcats for the 2025 season, her graduate season. Miller started all 19 matches for Cincinnati, recording 74 saves, the fourth-most in the Big 12, and eight shutouts, which ranked fifth in the conference.

== Club career ==
Miller joined Bay FC ahead of the club's 2026 National Women's Soccer League season as a non-roster invitee to preseason camp. On March 10, 2026, she signed her first professional contract with Bay FC through the 2026 season. Miller made her club and debut on April 17, 2026, appearing as a substitute in an international friendly against Ottawa Rapid FC and playing the final 20 minutes of a 1–0 victory. She did not go on to make a competitive appearance for Bay FC in her rookie year.
