= Molly Walker (footballer) =

English footballer

Personal information
- Full name: Mary Alice Walker
- Date of birth: 1898
- Place of birth: Lancaster, Lancashire, England

Senior career*
Years	Team	Apps	(Gls)
1917–1918	Lancaster Ladies		
1918–?	Dick, Kerr Ladies		
- * Club domestic league appearances and goals

Mary Alice Walker (1898 – ?) was an English women's association football player and the earliest known women's player to be transferred between clubs for a fee. She was one of four players who moved from Lancaster Ladies to Dick, Kerr Ladies F.C. after a match between the clubs in December 1917, and the only of the four offered compensation specific to her transfer. She debuted for Dick, Kerr Ladies against Barrow-in-Furness at Deepdale on Good Friday of 1918, in which Walker scored the match-winning goal.

== Club career ==
In two matches arranged by Lancaster Ladies against Dick, Kerr Ladies in December 1917, Walker played for Lancaster. In one match, Lancaster drew against Dick, Kerr 1–1. Dick, Kerr manager Alfred Frankland then offered Walker a position with his club, including compensation for expenses and time lost from work.

During the team's nine-week tour of the United States in 1922, Walker joined teammates Florie Haslam, Jennie Harris, and Lily Parr in a race against an American Olympic Games women's relay team at the Philadelphia Baseball Grounds before 45,000 spectators.

== Personal life ==
Walker's relationship with her boyfriend's family suffered due to her matchday attire of shorts, which revealed her legs.
