= Karlie Lema =

American soccer player (born 2003)

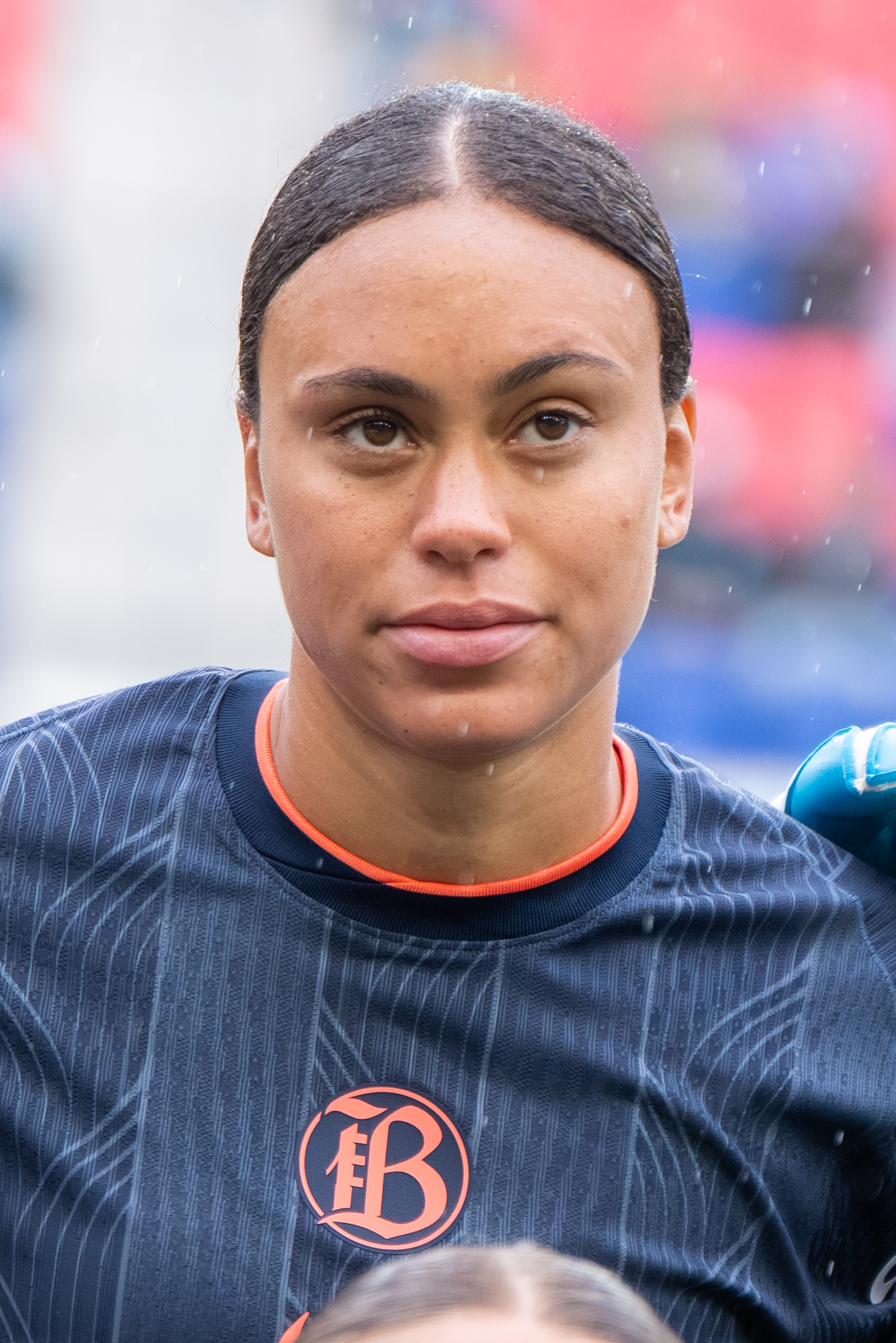
- Lema with Bay FC in 2026

Personal information
- Date of birth: June 29, 2003 (age 23)
- Place of birth: Morgan Hill, California, U.S.
- Height: 5 ft 10 in (1.78 m)
- Position: Striker

Team information
- Current team: Bay FC
- Number: 5

College career
| Years | Team | Apps | (Gls) |
| 2021–2024 | California Golden Bears | 76 | (31) |

Senior career*
| Years | Team | Apps | (Gls) |
| 2024 | San Francisco Glens | 2 | (1) |
| 2025– | Bay FC | 54 | (10) |

International career^{‡}
| 2018 | United States U-15 | | |
| 2019 | United States U-17 | | |
| 2025– | United States U-23 | 2 | (0) |
- * Club domestic league appearances and goals as of 05:09, November 2, 2026 (UTC) ‡ National team caps and goals as of December 2, 2025

Karlie Lema (born June 29, 2003) is an American professional soccer player who plays as a striker for Bay FC of the National Women's Soccer League (NWSL). She played college soccer for the California Golden Bears, where she was named the Atlantic Coast Conference (ACC) Offensive Player of the Year after scoring 16 goals in her senior season.

== Early life ==
Lema was born and raised in Morgan Hill, California, with four siblings. Her father, Dave Lema, played football at San Jose City College, and her mother, Annie Bergholz, ran track at Northern Colorado. Lema grew up doing track and gymnastics before starting soccer at the relatively late age of ten. She played ECNL club soccer for MVLA Soccer Club and committed to University of California, Berkeley, in eighth grade at Martin Murphy Middle School. She then attended Live Oak High School, where she competed in track and volleyball in addition to starring on the soccer team, being named the Blossom Valley Athletic League most valuable player three times. Hip issues kept her out of action for an 18-month period before college. She was rated a four-star recruit by TopDrawerSoccer and part of California's incoming class that was rated the best of 2020.

== College career ==
Lema was a four-year starter for the California Golden Bears. She led the team with 6 goals in 18 games as a freshman in 2021, being named to the Pac-12 Conference all-freshman team. After the season, she had surgery for her hip which repaired her labrum, and she returned to score a team-second-high 5 goals in 21 games in her sophomore season. Resting that spring helped resolve her hip issues before her junior season, when she scored 4 goals with a team-high 4 assists in 16 games, earning third-team All-Pac-12 honors.

She opened her final season with a prolific amount of scoring, ranking first in the nation with 13 goals over her first 10 games of 2024. California finished seventh in the Atlantic Coast Conference in their first season in the league, missing the six-team ACC tournament but making the NCAA tournament, where they lost in the second round. Lema ended the 2024 season with 16 goals (fourth-most in program history) and 6 assists in 21 appearances and was named the ACC Offensive Player of the Year and first-team All-ACC.

== Club career ==
=== San Francisco Glens ===
Before her senior season at Cal, Lema played for the San Francisco Glens in the pre-professional USL W League during the summer.

=== Bay FC ===
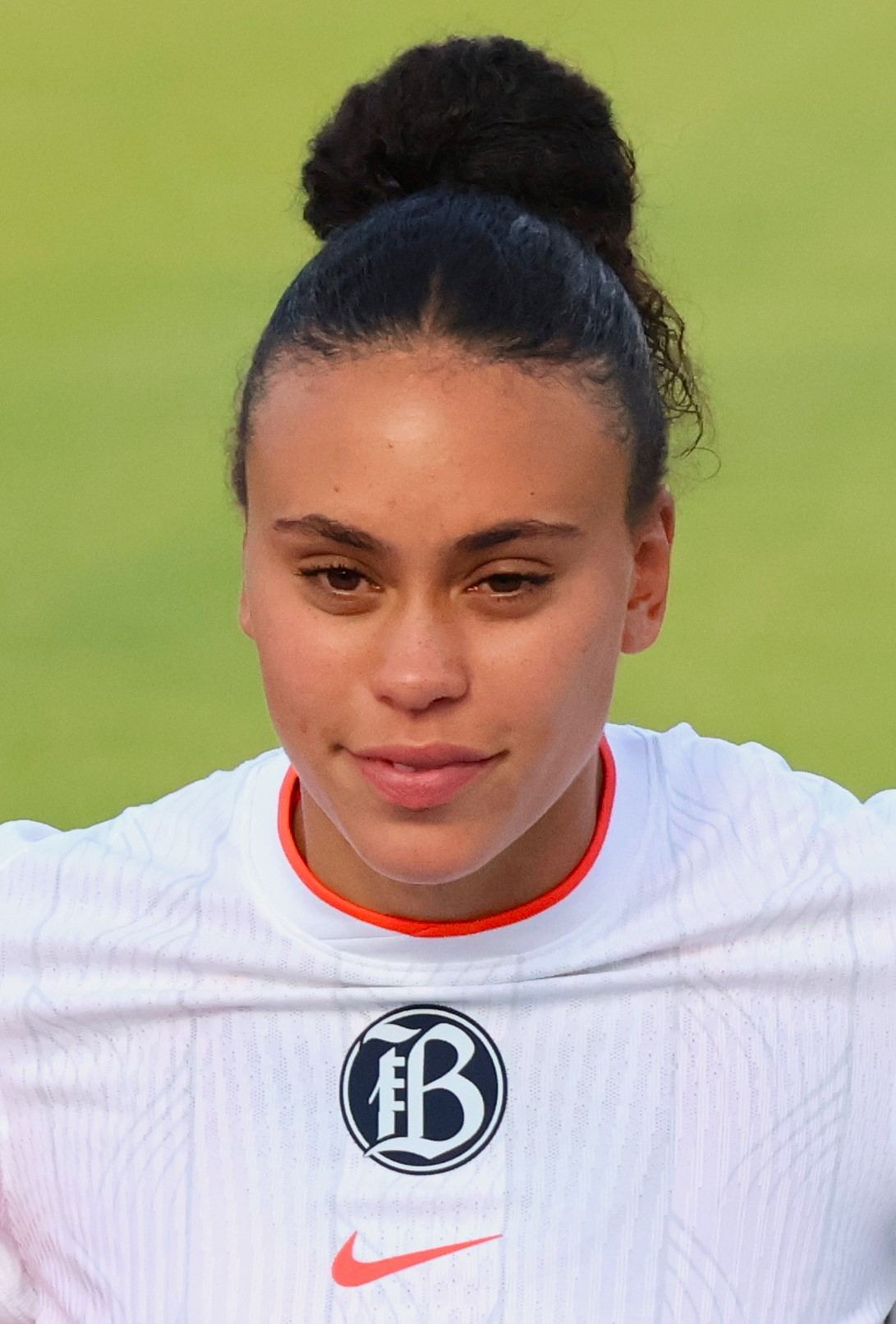
Lema with Bay FC in 2025

Bay FC announced on December 30, 2024, that they had signed Lema to her first professional contract, a three-year deal with an option for an additional year. She made her professional debut on March 15, coming on as a second-half substitute for Asisat Oshoala in the season opener, a 1–1 draw against the Utah Royals. The following week, she made her first start and scored her first professional goal in a 2–0 win against Racing Louisville on March 22. In first-half stoppage time, she won the ball and dribbled about 70 yards before unleashing a shot from the edge of the penalty box.

== International career ==
Lema played for the United States youth national team at the under-15 and under-17 levels from 2018 to 2020. She scored in all three games at the UEFA Development Tournament in 2019, including a hat trick against Czechia. She was called up to the under-23 team, training concurrently with the senior national team, in October 2025.

== Honors and awards ==
Individual

- ACC Offensive Player of the Year: 2024
- First-team All-ACC: 2024
- Third-team All-Pac-12: 2023
- Pac-12 all-freshman team: 2021
