= Diego Restrepo =

American soccer player (born 1988)

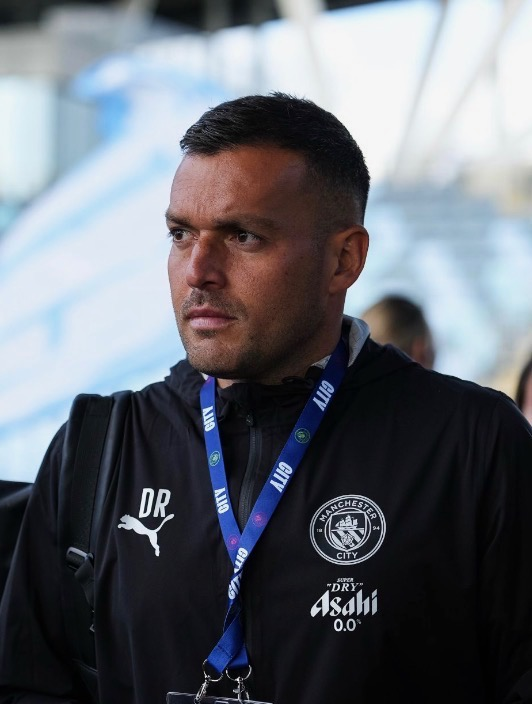
- Restrepo in 2026

Personal information
- Full name: Diego Alejandro Restrepo Garcia
- Date of birth: February 25, 1988 (age 38)
- Place of birth: Merida, Venezuela
- Height: 6 ft 0 in (1.83 m)
- Position: Goalkeeper

Team information
- Current team: Manchester City Women (Goalkeeping Coach)

Youth career
- 2004–2005: IMG Academy
- 2006–2008: South Florida Bulls
- 2009–2010: Virginia Cavaliers

Senior career*
Years	Team	Apps	(Gls)
2011	América de Cali	2	(0)
2012	Deportivo Táchira	3	(0)
2013	Tampa Bay Rowdies	18	(0)
2014	Charlotte Independence	12	(0)
2015	Metropolitanos	6	(0)
2016	Fort Lauderdale Strikers	15	(0)
2016	Tampa Bay Rowdies	0	(0)
2017–2018	San Antonio FC	43	(0)
2019–2020	Austin Bold FC	49	(0)
Total		148	(0)

International career
2005	United States U17	5	(0)

Managerial career
- 2020–2021: Austin FC (Academy GK Coach)
- 2022–2023: D.C. United (Head of Goalkeeping)
- 2024: Bay FC (Head of Goalkeeping)
- 2024–: Manchester City Women (GK Coach)
- 2024–: Wales Women (GK Coach)
- * Club domestic league appearances and goals

Diego Alejandro Restrepo García (born February 25, 1988) is a soccer coach and former player who played as a goalkeeper. He is currently the goalkeeping coach for Manchester City Women in the Women's Super League and the Wales women's national football team. Born in Venezuela, he is a youth international for the United States.

As a player, Restrepo was named the USL Goalkeeper of the Year in 2017 while playing for San Antonio FC.

== Early life ==
Restrepo was born in Mérida, Venezuela, and grew up in Colombia and the United States. He played college soccer at the University of South Florida for two years before transferring to the University of Virginia. In 2009, he helped lead the Cavaliers to the NCAA National Championship, earning Defensive MVP honors for the tournament.

During the '09 championship season, Restrepo broke school records previously held by Tony Meola for games played (25), minutes played (2348), shutouts (16), consecutive shutouts (11) and consecutive scoreless minutes (1176). He was named the Most Valuable Player (MVP) of the ACC Tournament and Defensive Most Valuable Player of the NCAA Tournament.

During his college years Restrepo also played for the Bradenton Academics in the USL Premier Development League.

== Club Career ==
In January 2011, Restrepo signed a professional contract with Colombian soccer club América de Cali. He made his professional debut on Wednesday, August 31, 2011, in America's 1–1 tie vs. Pereira.

Restrepo moved to Venezuelan club Deportivo Táchira on December 30, 2011. He played 8 competitive matches for Tachira, 4 in the Venezuelan Cup, and 4 in the Venezuelan First Division. He finished the season as Tachira's starter.

On March 20, 2013, the Tampa Bay Rowdies announced that Restrepo had signed a two-year contract with the club. He excelled after being named the Rowdies starting goalkeeper, playing in 26 matches in all competitions. He was named the "NASL Player Of The Week" 3 times and to the "NASL Team Of the Week" 7 times in 2013.

During the Rowdies' 2014 preseason training, Restrepo tore his Achilles tendon and was sidelined for the entirety of the 2014 season. On November 6, Restrepo announced he would be moving on from Tampa Bay.

Restrepo signed with USL club Charlotte Independence on February 24, 2015. During his short stay with Charlotte, he played in 3 matches, 2 in the U.S. Open Cup and 1 in USL league play.

In June 2015, Restrepo is transferred to Metropolitanos FC, returning to the Venezuelan First Division. On August 1, 2015, Restrepo takes over the starting role at Metropolitanos, helping the team snap a 3-game losing streak. Restrepo stays as Metropolitanos starting goalkeeper, making 16 starts in all competitions, including 12 league starts.

Restrepo joined NASL side Fort Lauderdale Strikers on December 31, 2015. He helped the Strikers earn their first win of the season, on the road in his club debut on May 7, 2016, 3-1 vs. the league leading Carolina Railhawks. The following week, he cemented his starting role with his first shutout of the season, in a 0–0 draw vs. the Indy Eleven. With Restrepo in goal, the Strikers improved from 9th place in the league standings, to 1 point away from the Spring Season title. Restrepo helped the Strikers reach the final 8 of the 2016 US Open Cup, and for his heroics is named lower division player of the tournament.

Due to the dire financial situation of the Strikers, Restrepo was transferred briefly back to the Tampa Bay Rowdies to finish the 2016 North American Soccer League season. He served as the backup goalkeeper for the last month of the Rowdies season.

On March 9, 2017, San Antonio FC of the USL announces the signing of Restrepo for the 2017 season. After week 5, when starting keeper Matt Cardone was lost for the season due to injury, Restrepo establishes himself as SAFC's starter and goes on to have a record breaking season, leading the club to the best collective defensive performance in the league, recording just four losses and conceding 24 goals (21 individually). Restrepo led the USL with 12 clean sheets, recording 69 saves, posting a 76.7 percent save success rate, and finishing as runner-up in the race for the USL Golden Glove with a 0.80 goals against average. For his performance, Restrepo was named the 2017 United Soccer League Goalkeeper Of The Year, and to the 2017 United Soccer League Best Eleven.

In 2018 Restrepo lost his starting role due to injury, and he signed with Austin Bold FC on 17 January 2019.

== U.S. Open Cup ==
Restrepo has had much success in the Lamar Hunt U.S. Open Cup throughout his career. In 2013, he helped the Tampa Bay Rowdies knock out Seattle Sounders FC, saving an Obafemi Martins penalty kick in the 84th minute to preserve the 1–0 result. In 2015, Restrepo helped the Charlotte Independence attain their first win versus a higher division opponent, coming on in the 40th minute to preserve the shutout and 1–0 victory versus the NASL's Carolina Railhawks.

In 2016, Restrepo was the star of the Fort Lauderdale Strikers run to the Open Cup's final 8. He tallied a shutout and stopped 3 penalty kicks during the shootout win vs. the Richmond Kickers, earning U.S. Open Cup player of the round. In the round of 36, he held D.C. United scoreless during 120 minutes of play, and stopped a penalty kick during the shootout, helping the Strikers advance to the round of 16. Restrepo was also a key performer in the Strikers 2–1 win vs. Orlando City SC making several vital saves in the match, and earning a reputation as an "MLS killer" in the tournament. For his impressive performances in the 2016 Tournament, Restrepo was the "U.S. Open Cup Lower Division Player of the Tournament".

== International Career ==
Despite being born in Venezuela, Restrepo has represented the United States at the youth level. He is a graduate of the U.S. U-17 Residency Program. In 2005, he was a member of the U.S. U-17 World Cup squad that participated in the 2005 Youth World Cup in Peru. He has also been a member of the U.S. U-20 National Team.

== Coaching career ==
Following his retirement from playing in 2020, Restrepo transitioned into coaching.

=== Austin FC ===
Restrepo started his club coaching career in 2020 as the academy goalkeeping coach for Major League Soccer side Austin FC.

=== D.C. United ===
In February 2022, Restrepo was hired as the Head of Goalkeeping for D.C. United, joining the staff of head coach Hernán Losada and later working under Wayne Rooney. On December 14, 2023, Restrepo was announced as Head of Goalkeeper for Bay FC of the National Women's Soccer League. He was reunited with general manager Lucy Rushton, who worked in the same position while Restrepo was at D.C. United.

=== Bay FC ===
In December 2023, Restrepo was appointed as the Head of Goalkeeping for Bay FC ahead of their inaugural season in the National Women's Soccer League (NWSL). "Bay FC Announces Coaching Staff Ahead of Inaugural Season". Bay FC. December 14, 2023.

=== Manchester City ===
In September 2024, Restrepo joined Manchester City Women of the English Women's Super League as the first-team goalkeeping coach. "Diego Restrepo named Goalkeeper Coach for Manchester City". Ignite Talent. September 1, 2024.

=== Wales National Team ===
Concurrent with his club duties, Restrepo currently serves as the goalkeeping coach for the Wales women's national football team.

== Honors ==
Virginia Cavaliers

- NCAA Men's Division I Soccer Championship (1): 2009

America De Cali

- Copa Cafam (1): 2011

Individual

- 2017 USL Goalkeeper Of The Year
- 2017 USL Best Eleven
