= Desiree Scott =

Canadian soccer player (born 1987)

Desiree Scott OM
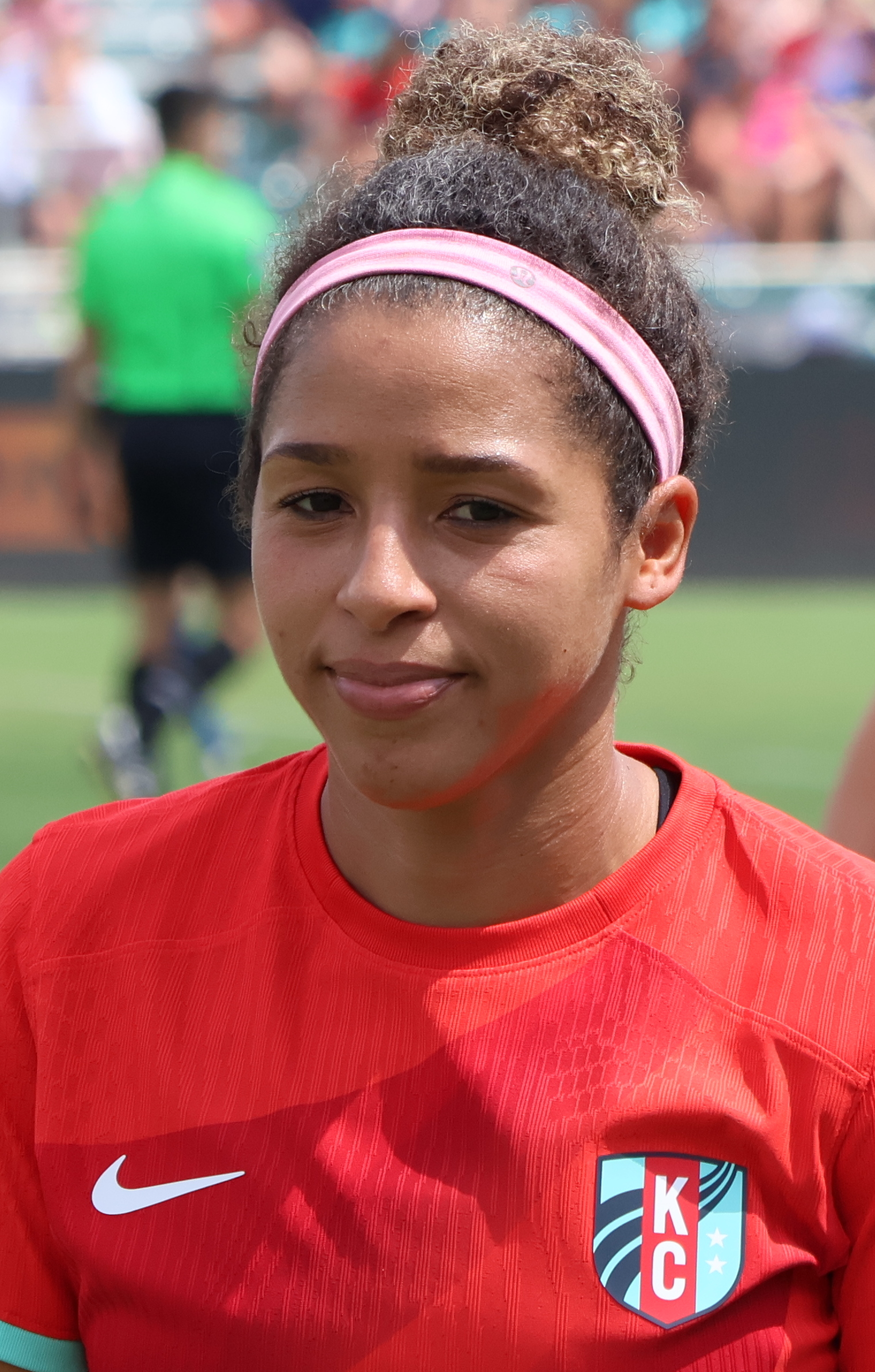
- Scott with the Kansas City Current in 2024

Personal information
- Full name: Desiree Rose Marie Scott
- Date of birth: July 31, 1987 (age 39)
- Place of birth: Winnipeg, Manitoba, Canada
- Height: 1.60 m (5 ft 3 in)
- Position: Midfielder

Youth career
- Maples Cougars
- FC Northwest

College career
Years	Team	Apps	(Gls)
2005–2009	Manitoba Bisons		

Senior career*
Years	Team	Apps	(Gls)
2006	Vancouver Whitecaps FC	5	(0)
2010–2012	Vancouver Whitecaps FC	8	(1)
2013	FC Kansas City	21	(0)
2014–2015	Notts County	20	(0)
2016–2017	FC Kansas City	35	(0)
2018–2020	Utah Royals	38	(0)
2021–2024	Kansas City Current	44	(0)
2025	Ottawa Rapid FC	22	(1)

International career^{‡}
2003	Canada U16	4	(0)
2005–2006	Canada U19	21	(0)
2010–2025	Canada	188	(0)
Medal record
Women's soccer
Representing Canada
Olympic Games
Gold medal – first place	2020	Team
Bronze medal – third place	2012	Team
Bronze medal – third place	2016	Team
Pan American Games
Gold medal – first place	2011	Team
- * Club domestic league appearances and goals as of October 17, 2025 ‡ National team caps and goals as of May 31, 2025

Desiree Rose Marie Scott (born July 31, 1987) is a Canadian former professional soccer player who played for Canada national team. Nicknamed "the destroyer", she won gold at the 2020 Olympics in Tokyo, which was her third Olympic medal following bronze medals in 2012 in London and in 2016 in Rio.

== Early life ==
Scott was born and raised in Winnipeg, Manitoba. Her father was born in Kingston, Jamaica, while her mother was also born in Winnipeg. She grew up participating in soccer, volleyball, track and field, and basketball. She began playing soccer at the age of eight.

== University career ==
From 2005 to 2009, Scott played Canadian Interuniversity Sport (CIS) soccer for the University of Manitoba. During her tenure with the Bisons, she was named a first team CIS All-Canadian in 2009. She earned Canada West All-Star honours twice and won the Canada West Rookie of the Year award in 2005.

== Club career ==
=== Early career ===
Scott played for the Vancouver Whitecaps FC from 2006 to 2012. In 2006, Scott appeared in five matches for the Caps (450 minutes), contributing to the team winning their second W-League title that season.

In 2010, she appeared in seven games and two playoff games for the team contributing one goal and one assist. Scott helped carry the Whitecaps to the W-League Championship where they eventually fell to Buffalo in the final.

=== FC Kansas City ===
In 2013, as part of the NWSL Player Allocation, Scott joined FC Kansas City in the new National Women's Soccer League. Notts County Ladies of the English FA WSL announced that they had signed Scott in January 2014, but she was subsequently included on the list of Canadian players allocated to the NWSL for 2014.

=== Notts County ===
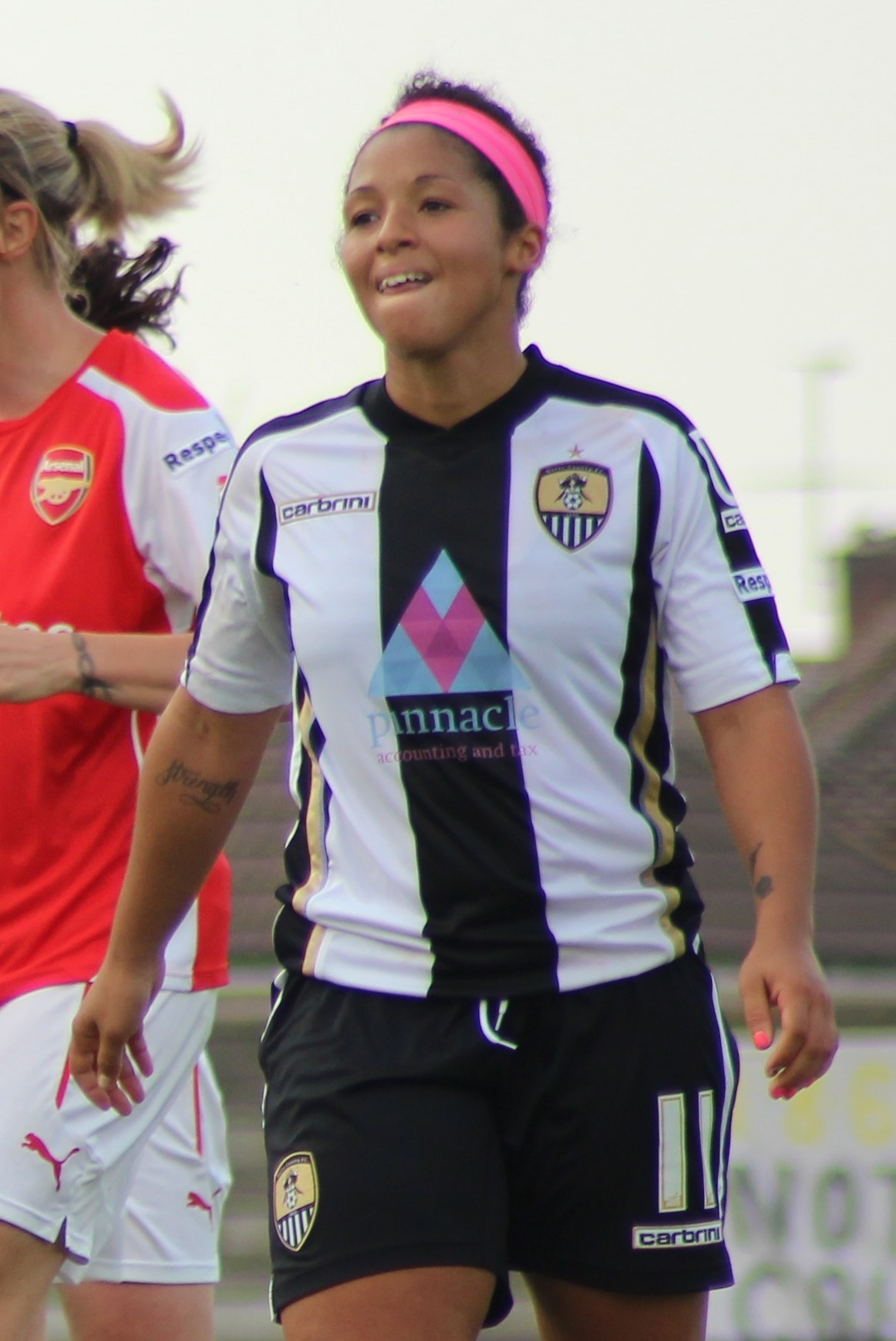
Playing for Notts County in 2014

In February 2014, after more than a month of speculation and legal delays, Scott was officially signed by Notts County of the FA WSL. She missed the first half of the 2015 season while preparing for the World Cup with Canada, but returned in time for the 2015 FA Women's Cup Final at Wembley Stadium, which County lost 1–0 to Chelsea. She left the club in February 2016 after making 20 league appearances.

=== Return to FC Kansas City ===
In February 2016, it was announced that Scott would play for FC Kansas City for the 2016 season of the National Women's Soccer League via the NWSL Player Allocation.

=== Utah Royals FC ===
In February 2018, the Canadian Soccer Association announced that Scott would play for the Utah Royals FC during the 2018 season of the National Women's Soccer League via the NWSL Player Allocation. She opted out of play during the 2020 NWSL Challenge Cup and the NWSL Fall Series.

=== Kansas City Current ===
Utah Royals FC folded in December 2020 and her playing rights were transferred to the Kansas City Current.

In October 2024, Scott announced that she would retire from the NWSL at the end of the 2024 season.

=== Ottawa Rapid FC ===
In January 2025, she signed with Northern Super League club Ottawa Rapid FC. Scott scored her first professional goal, in the club's first ever match on April 27, 2025 against AFC Toronto.

On September 22, 2025, Scott announced that she would retire from playing professional soccer following the end of the 2025 season. Speaking about her final season, she said "I only hope that in my time playing for the Ottawa Rapid, I’ve helped inspire those around me through my play and my tenacious yet joyful spirit on the pitch," and that “Closing out the final chapter of my playing career here on Canadian soil, in front of incredible fans in a professional league once dreamed of, has been my honour.”

With her team having already clinched a spot in the playoffs, Scott's career was celebrated during the Rapid's final regular season game at home in the 2025 season, at which the Ottawa mayor Mark Sutcliffe declared October 8 in the city to be "Desiree Scott Day" and fans in the crowd of 2906 donned pink headbands in her honour.

== International career ==
Scott has previously represented Canada on the U-16 and U-19 youth teams. After being called up to the senior squad by Carolina Morace, she debuted at the 2010 Cyprus Cup and participated in her first FIFA Women's World Cup at the 2011 event, making two substitute appearances. Under coach John Herdman, Scott became a regular pick and won a gold medal at the 2011 Pan American Games.

At the 2012 London Olympics, Scott won praise for her performances in the defensive midfield role, drawing comparison to the male player Edgar Davids. She had a major contribution for the team in the bronze medal game, clearing a ball off the line in defence of the goal to keep the score even at zero. Upon return to her native Winnipeg, Scott was serenaded with chants of her name and outbursts of song consisting of the Canadian national anthem at the Winnipeg airport. Scott took note of the welcome with pride saying that "I'm a very emotional person. To come home and hear my name being screamed... I'm holding back tears right now."

On February 11, 2016 Scott became the 15th women's player to make 100 appearances for Canada.

In May 2019 Scott was named to the roster for the 2019 FIFA Women's World Cup.

Scott was called up to the Canada squad for the delayed 2020 Summer Olympics.

Scott was called up to the Canada squad for the 2022 CONCACAF W Championship, where Canada finished as runners-up.

Scott was an alternate at the 2024 Summer Olympics.

In April 2025, Scott announced she would retire from international play, and that a friendly against Haiti on May 31, 2025, hosted in Winnipeg, would serve as a celebration of her career and her final international appearance.

== Coaching career ==
Scott is an assistant coach at her alma mater, University of Manitoba. She was an assistant coach for the West Kildonan Collegiate from 2003 until 2005. She also coached at the South End United Soccer Academy, and ran camps for kids while playing with the Vancouver Whitecaps and the Canadian women's national team. Scott has also run soccer clinics and camps, and was presenter and instructor for a number of different high school clubs in Winnipeg.

Scott has been an ambassador for the Homeless World Cup since 2014. She is also an athlete ambassador for KidSport Winnipeg, a charity that aims to remove the financial barriers to playing sport, and runs an annual soccer camp for girls on behalf of KidSport Winnipeg.

== Post-playing career ==
Following her retirement from professional play, on January 12, 2026, Scott was announced as Director of Technical Development and Initiatives for FC Northwest, a club she had played for in her youth.

On July 14, 2026, it was announced that the NSL's expansion team for the 2027 season would be based in Winnipeg, later named Winnipeg Ember FC, with Scott as its co-founder alongside Rob Gale.

== Honours ==
Kansas City Current

- NWSL x Liga MX Femenil Summer Cup: 2024

Canada

- Summer Olympics: 2021; bronze medal: 2012, 2016
- Pan American Games: 2011

Individual

- Canada West Hall of Fame Inductee: 2019

== Civilian honours ==
Ribbon	Description	Post-nominal letters	Notes
	Order of Manitoba	OM	
	Queen Elizabeth II Platinum Jubilee Medal		

== See also ==
- List of women's footballers with 100 or more caps
