= Emma Coates =

English football manager (born 1991)

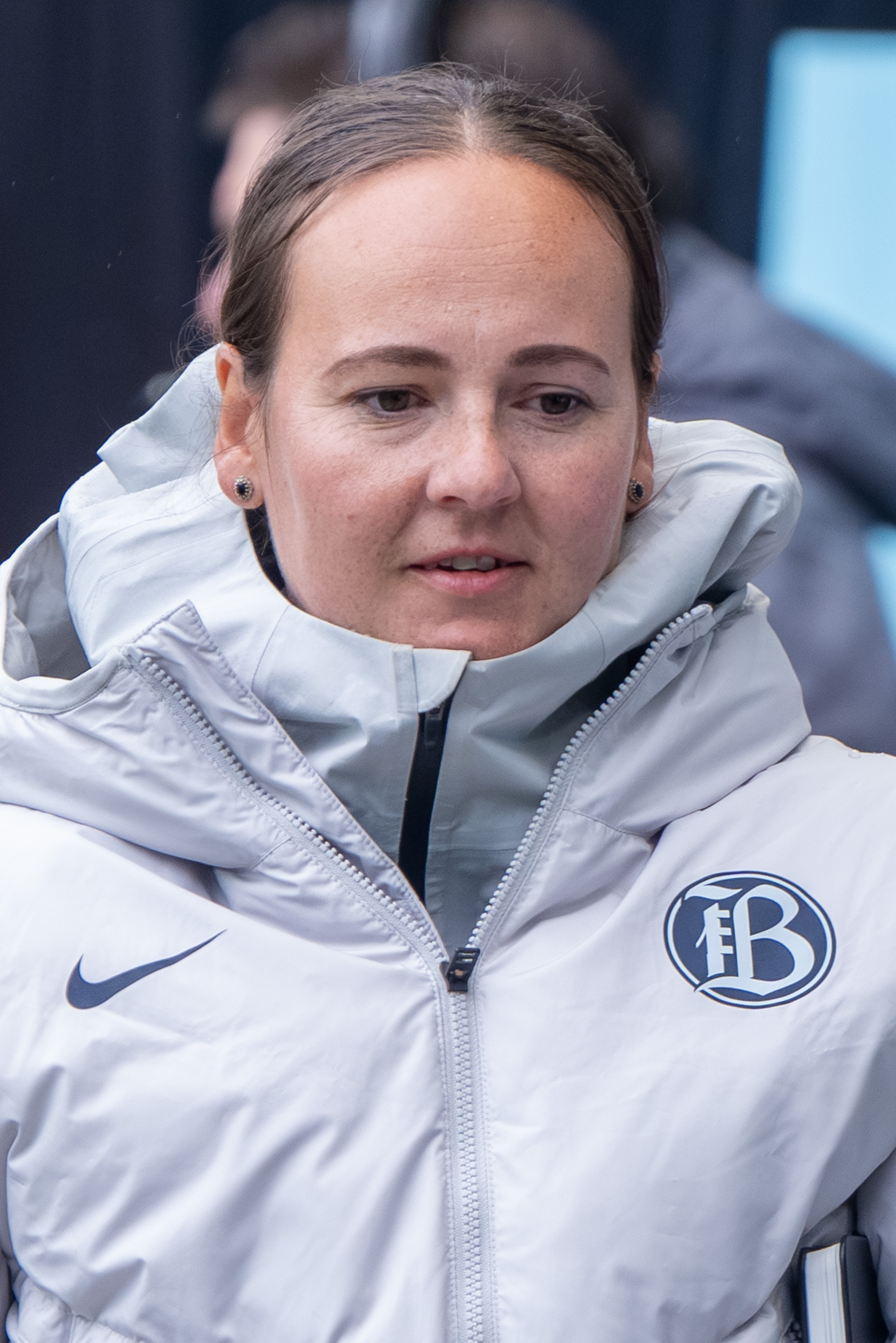
- Coates with Bay FC in 2026

Personal information
- Date of birth: 29 April 1991 (age 35)
- Place of birth: England
- Position: Defender

Team information
- Current team: Bay FC (head coach)

Senior career*
Years	Team	Apps	(Gls)
2011–2012	Leeds United		

Managerial career
- 2016–2017: Doncaster Rovers Belles
- 2022–2023: England U19
- 2023–2025: England U23
- 2026–: Bay FC
- * Club domestic league appearances and goals

Emma Coates (born 29 April 1991) is an English football manager and former player who is the head coach of Bay FC of the National Women's Soccer League (NWSL). She previously managed Doncaster Rovers Belles and England international youth teams.

== Club career ==
She played for Leeds United between 2011 and 2012 at the age of 20.

== Managerial career ==
=== Doncaster Rovers Belles ===
Coates joined the at the time struggling Women's Super League club Doncaster Belles as a coach in 2014, becoming the head coach in June 2016. In October 2017 she become a specialist coach with England women's youth teams. Her final game as manager for the Belles resulted in a 6–0 win over Aston Villa on 31 October.

=== England youth teams ===
In February 2023, Coates was appointed head coach of the England women's under-23 team. In joint training sessions with the senior team she coordinates with Lioness manager Sarina Wiegman. In April 2024, the under-23 team ended the U23 European League unbeaten, while competing against eight national teams. Under Coates BBC Sport described the squad as thriving. Goal.com described Coates as "one of the brightest young coaches in the women’s game", with over 25 players being called up to the senior team from the under-23 squad under her tenure, including Lucia Kendall, Michelle Agyemang, Aggie Beever-Jones, Anouk Denton, Freya Godfrey, Katie Reid, Grace Clinton and Jess Park.

=== Bay FC ===
On 4 December 2025, American National Women's Soccer League club Bay FC announced Coates as the club's new head coach. She replaced Albertin Montoya who resigned in September after the team finished second from bottom in the 2025 season.

== Managerial honours ==
Doncaster Rovers Belles

- FA WSL 2: 2017 runner-up
