= NWSL playoffs =

U.S. women's professional soccer championships

The National Women's Soccer League playoffs (or NWSL playoffs) are a single-elimination tournament among eight teams in the National Women's Soccer League (NWSL) of the United States. The final round of the playoffs is the NWSL Championship.

Since playoff games cannot end in draws, they are broken by two consecutive 15-minute extra time periods, followed by penalty shoot-outs of best-of-five rounds with additional rounds as required.

== Format ==
Since the 2024 season, the top eight teams in the final standings at the end of the regular season qualify for the playoffs and are seeded in order of their record. The top-seed hosts the eighth seed and the fourth hosts the fifth in one arm of the quarterfinals bracket, and the runner-up hosts the seventh seed and the third hosts the sixth in the other arm. In the semifinals, teams are not reseeded and the winners within each quarterfinals arm play each other.

From 2021 to 2023, the top 6 teams qualified for a three-round playoff, and the top two seeds had a first-round bye. From 2013 to 2019, the top 4 teams qualified for a two-round playoff.

In 2013 and 2014, the higher seeded team to reach the championship hosted the match. Since 2015, the championship has been hosted at a predetermined site.

Playoff formats and championship hosts
Year	Qualifiers	Rounds	Championship host		
Year	Qualifiers	Rounds	Determination	Stadium	City
2013	Top 4	2	Higher seed	Sahlen's Stadium	Rochester, New York
2014	Top 4	2	Higher seed	Starfire Sports Stadium	Tukwila, Washington
2015	Top 4	2	Predetermined site	Providence Park	Portland, Oregon
2016	Top 4	2	Predetermined site	BBVA Compass Stadium	Houston, Texas
2017	Top 4	2	Predetermined site	Orlando City Stadium	Orlando, Florida
2018	Top 4	2	Predetermined site	Providence Park	Portland, Oregon
2019	Top 4	2	Predetermined site	Sahlen's Stadium at WakeMed Soccer Park	Cary, North Carolina
2020	No NWSL season or playoffs; 2020 NWSL Challenge Cup and 2020 NWSL Fall Series				
2021	Top 6	3 (bye for top 2 seeds)	Predetermined site	Lynn Family Stadium	Louisville, Kentucky
2022	Top 6	3 (bye for top 2 seeds)	Predetermined site	Audi Field	Washington, D.C.
2023	Top 6	3 (bye for top 2 seeds)	Predetermined site	Snapdragon Stadium	San Diego, California
2024	Top 8	3	Predetermined site	CPKC Stadium	Kansas City, Missouri
2025	Top 8	3	Predetermined site	PayPal Park	San Jose, California
2026	Top 8	3	Predetermined site	Audi Field	Washington, D.C.

=== Tiebreakers ===
The initial determining factor for a team's position in the standings is most points earned, with three points earned for a win, one point for a draw, and none for a loss. Since the 2022 season, if at least two teams tie in point total, when determining rank and playoff qualification and seeding, the NWSL uses the following tiebreaker rules, going down the list until all teams are ranked.

1. Overall goal difference
2. Most total wins (regular season only)
3. Most goals scored (regular season only)
4. Head-to-head results (total points accumulated)
5. Head-to-head most goals scored
6. Fewest disciplinary points accumulated:
  - First yellow card: -1 point
  - Indirect red card (second yellow card): -3 points
  - Direct red card: -4 points
  - Yellow card and direct red card: -5 points
  - Only one of the above point totals shall be applied to a player in a single game.
7. Coin flip (2 teams)/Drawing of lots (3+ teams)

If two clubs remain tied after another club with the same number of points advances during any step, the tie breaker reverts to step 1 of the two-club format.

Prior to the 2022 season, the first tiebreaker was head-to-head record.

== Playoff series history ==
=== 2013 season ===
Semifinals
1	Western NY Flash	2
4	Sky Blue FC (Note: Known as Sky Blue FC until 2020, NJ/NY Gotham FC 2021–2024.)	0
2	FC Kansas City	2
3	Portland Thorns FC (a.e.t.)	3

Championship
1	Western NY Flash	0
3	Portland Thorns FC	2

=== 2014 season ===
Semifinals
1	Seattle Reign FC	2
4	Washington Spirit	1
2	FC Kansas City	2
3	Portland Thorns FC	0

Championship
1	Seattle Reign FC	1
2	FC Kansas City	2

=== 2015 season ===
Semifinals
1	Seattle Reign FC	3
4	Washington Spirit	0
2	Chicago Red Stars	0
3	FC Kansas City	3

Championship
1	Seattle Reign FC	0
3	FC Kansas City	1

=== 2016 season ===
Semifinals
1	Portland Thorns FC	3
4	Western NY Flash (a.e.t.)	4
2	Washington Spirit (a.e.t.)	2
3	Chicago Red Stars	1

Championship
4	Western NY Flash (p)	2 (3)
2	Washington Spirit	2 (2)

=== 2017 season ===
Semifinals
1	NC Courage	1
4	Chicago Red Stars	0
2	Portland Thorns FC	4
3	Orlando Pride	1

Championship
1	NC Courage	0
2	Portland Thorns FC	1

=== 2018 season ===
Semifinals
1	NC Courage	2
4	Chicago Red Stars	0
2	Portland Thorns FC	2
3	Seattle Reign FC	1

Championship
1	NC Courage	3
2	Portland Thorns FC	0

=== 2019 season ===
Semifinals
1	NC Courage (a.e.t.)	4
4	Reign FC (Note: Seattle Reign FC was previously known as Reign FC (2019) and OL Reign (2020–2023).)	1
2	Chicago Red Stars	1
3	Portland Thorns FC	0

Championship
1	NC Courage	4
2	Chicago Red Stars	0

=== 2020 season ===
The NWSL canceled its regular season and playoffs in 2020 due to the impact of the COVID-19 pandemic on sports.

=== 2021 season ===
First round
4	Chicago Red Stars	1
5	NJ/NY Gotham FC	0
3	Washington Spirit (a.e.t.)	1
6	NC Courage	0

Semifinals
1	Portland Thorns FC	0
4	Chicago Red Stars	2
2	OL Reign	1
3	Washington Spirit	2

Championship
4	Chicago Red Stars	1
3	Washington Spirit (a.e.t.)	2

=== 2022 season ===
First round
4	Houston Dash	1
5	Kansas City Current	2
3	San Diego Wave FC	2
6	Chicago Red Stars	1

Semifinals
1	OL Reign	0
5	Kansas City Current	2
2	Portland Thorns FC	2
3	San Diego Wave FC	1

Championship
5	Kansas City Current	0
2	Portland Thorns FC	2

=== 2023 season ===
Quarterfinals
4	OL Reign	1
5	Angel City FC	0
3	North Carolina Courage	0
6	NJ/NY Gotham FC	2

Semifinals
1	San Diego Wave FC	0
4	OL Reign	1
2	Portland Thorns FC	0
6	NJ/NY Gotham FC (a.e.t.)	1

Championship
4	OL Reign	1
6	NJ/NY Gotham FC	2

=== 2024 season ===
Quarterfinals
1	Orlando Pride	4
8	Chicago Red Stars	1
4	Kansas City Current	1
5	North Carolina Courage	0
2	Washington Spirit	2
7	Bay FC	1
3	NJ/NY Gotham FC	2
6	Portland Thorns FC	1

Semifinals
1	Orlando Pride	3
4	Kansas City Current	2
2	Washington Spirit (p)	1 (3)
3	NJ/NY Gotham FC	1 (0)

Championship
1	Orlando Pride	1
2	Washington Spirit	0

=== 2025 season ===
Quarterfinals
1	Kansas City Current	1
8	Gotham FC (a.e.t.)	2
4	Orlando Pride	2
5	Seattle Reign FC	0
2	Washington Spirit (p)	1 (3)
7	Racing Louisville FC	1 (1)
3	Portland Thorns FC (a.e.t.)	1
6	San Diego Wave FC	0

Semifinals
8	Gotham FC	1
4	Orlando Pride	0
2	Washington Spirit	2
3	Portland Thorns FC	0

Championship
8	Gotham FC	1
2	Washington Spirit	0

=== 2026 season ===
Quarterfinals
1	Gotham FC	1
8	Seattle Reign FC	0
4	Kansas City Current	1 (a.e.t.)
5	Angel City FC	0
3	Washington Spirit	4
6	Portland Thorns FC	1
2	San Diego Wave FC	0
7	Utah Royals	1

Semifinals
1	Gotham FC	1
4	Kansas City Current	2
3	Washington Spirit	2
7	Utah Royals	1

Championship
3	Washington Spirit	1
4	Kansas City Current	2

== Records and statistics ==
As of November 14, 2026

Italics indicates a defunct team.

=== Playoff results ===
Club	Won	Runner-up	Years won	Years runner-up
Portland Thorns FC	3	1	2013, 2017, 2022	2018
North Carolina Courage	2	1	2018, 2019	2017
FC Kansas City	2	0	2014, 2015	
Gotham FC	2	0	2023, 2025	
Washington Spirit	1	3	2021	2016, 2024, 2025
Western New York Flash	1	1	2016	2013
Kansas City Current	1	1	2026	2022
Orlando Pride	1	0	2024	
Seattle Reign FC	0	3		2014, 2015, 2023
Chicago Stars FC (Note: Known as Chicago Red Stars until 2025.)	0	2		2019, 2021

=== Playoff records ===
Team	GP	W	L	Last playoff	Last title
Portland Thorns FC	17	8	9	2026	2022
Washington Spirit	14	10	4	2026	2021
Seattle Reign FC	13	4	9	2026	–
Chicago Stars FC	11	3	8	2024	–
Gotham FC	11	8	3	2026	2025
North Carolina Courage	9	5	4	2024	2019
Kansas City Current	7	4	3	2026	–
Orlando Pride	6	4	2	2025	2024
FC Kansas City	5	4	1	2015	2015
San Diego Wave FC	5	1	4	2026	–
Western New York Flash	4	3	1	2016	2016
Angel City FC	2	0	2	2026	–
Utah Royals	2	1	1	2026	–
Houston Dash	1	0	1	2022	–
Bay FC	1	0	1	2024	–
Racing Louisville FC	1	0	1	2025	–
Boston Breakers	0	0	0	–	–
Boston Legacy FC	0	0	0	–	–
Denver Summit FC	0	0	0	–	–

=== Appearances by team ===
Team	App.	Last
Portland Thorns FC	12	2026
Chicago Stars FC	8	2024
Seattle Reign FC	9	2026
North Carolina Courage	6	2024
Washington Spirit	6	2026
Gotham FC	6	2026
San Diego Wave FC	4	2026
FC Kansas City	3	2015
Kansas City Current	4	2026
Orlando Pride	3	2025
Western New York Flash	2	2016
Angel City FC	2	2026
Houston Dash	1	2022
Bay FC	1	2024
Racing Louisville FC	1	2025
Utah Royals	1	2026
Boston Breakers	No playoff appearances	
Boston Legacy FC	No playoff appearances	
Denver Summit FC	No playoff appearances	
