= Winnipeg Ember FC =

Women's soccer team in Winnipeg, Manitoba

- Full name: Winnipeg Ember Football Club
- Founded: July 14, 2026; 4 months ago
- Ground: Ralph Cantafio Soccer Complex; Winnipeg, Manitoba
- Capacity: 2,000 (current); 4,500 (planned)
- Co-founders: Desiree Scott; Rob Gale
- President: Dayna Spiring
- Manager: TBA
- League: Northern Super League
- Website: emberfc.ca

Winnipeg Ember FC is a professional women's soccer club based in Winnipeg, Manitoba, that will compete in the Northern Super League (NSL), the top women's flight of the Canadian soccer league system. The team will be the seventh NSL franchise, and the first expansion club since league's establishment in 2025, contesting their inaugural season in 2027.

== Identity ==
=== Name ===
The club's name, Winnipeg Ember FC, was unveiled on November 4, 2026, at The Forks in Winnipeg. The name was chosen to reflect the city's resilience, community spirit, and prairie light that "shows up early, stays late and never lets the light dim." The term "ember" refers to the glow at the edge of the day; specifically, the first light over the horizon in the morning and the last light before sunset.

=== Crest ===
A stylized Sundog is at the centre of the crest, which the club describes as a guardian of the light that runs the horizon at first and last light. The design also contains a subtle "W" for Winnipeg, and a star representing the morning star and its connection to the first light of day. The Sundog and star are rendered in the same sharp, angular style.

=== Colours ===
The club's colour palette is inspired by the Manitoba prairie sky at sunrise and sunset. It consists of five official colours:

- Midnight Dusk: Deep colour of the sky after the last light and before the first.
- Violet Haze: Band of violet that settles over the horizon before sunrise and after sunset.
- Destroyer Pink: Boldest moment of a prairie sky when the whole sky lights up; also a reference to co-founder Desiree Scott's nickname, "the Destroyer".
- Sunset Blush: Soft pink that catches clouds and snow at the edges of the day.
- Ember Glow: Gold on the horizon line, where the sun meets the land; described as the ember itself.

=== Tagline ===
The club's tagline is "Let Them Howl." The phrase has two meanings: first, as a reference to the Sundog—"when the Sundog howls, Winnipeg answers"—and second, as a reference to Manitoba suffragist Nellie McClung, who led the movement that first gave women in Manitoba the right to vote in 1916, who said: "Never retract, never explain, never apologize; get the thing done and let them howl."

== History ==
In 2025, Valour FC, Winnipeg's men's professional soccer team folded after seven seasons in the Canadian Premier League. Also in 2025, the NSL announced it had launched an expansion process, considering locations in Central and Western Canada, with a targeted entry date of 2027.

In early 2026, Winnipeg-born former Canadian international, who played in the NSL for Ottawa Rapid, Desiree Scott, and former head coach of Valour FC Rob Gale told media they were working to bring a pro women's franchise to Winnipeg. On July 14, 2026, the league announced that the city had been awarded the seventh NSL franchise, with Scott and Gale announced as co-founders and that they would be part of the club's backroom setup.

On September 22, 2026, Dayna Spiring, former chair of the Winnipeg Blue Bombers, was named as the club's first president. Originally referred to as simply "NSL Winnipeg", the club's name, crest, colours, and identity were announced on November 4, 2026. The club held local tryouts the following weekend.

== Stadium ==
In September 2026, it was confirmed that the team will play their home games at the Ralph Cantafio Soccer Complex in south Winnipeg, which previously had a capacity of 2,000 the time of the announcement. The club is building a soccer-dedicated stadium on the site that will hold 4,500 people, including 900 in standing room. This was jointly funded by the NSL, who are contributing the majority of funding, with support from municipal, provincial, and federal governments. The stadium project is led by SixFive Sports & Entertainment, the ownership group behind Canadian Premier League sides Pacific FC and Vancouver FC and the constructor of Willoughby Stadium. The stadium will be built with a modular design, allowing the stadium to be expanded should the club and league's popularity increase.

== Organization ==
As of September 22, 2026

Executive
President	(Canada) Dayna Spiring
Vice president, community and player experience	(Canada) Desiree Scott
Chief sporting officer	(England) Rob Gale
