= Rob Gale =

English footballer and coach (born 1977)

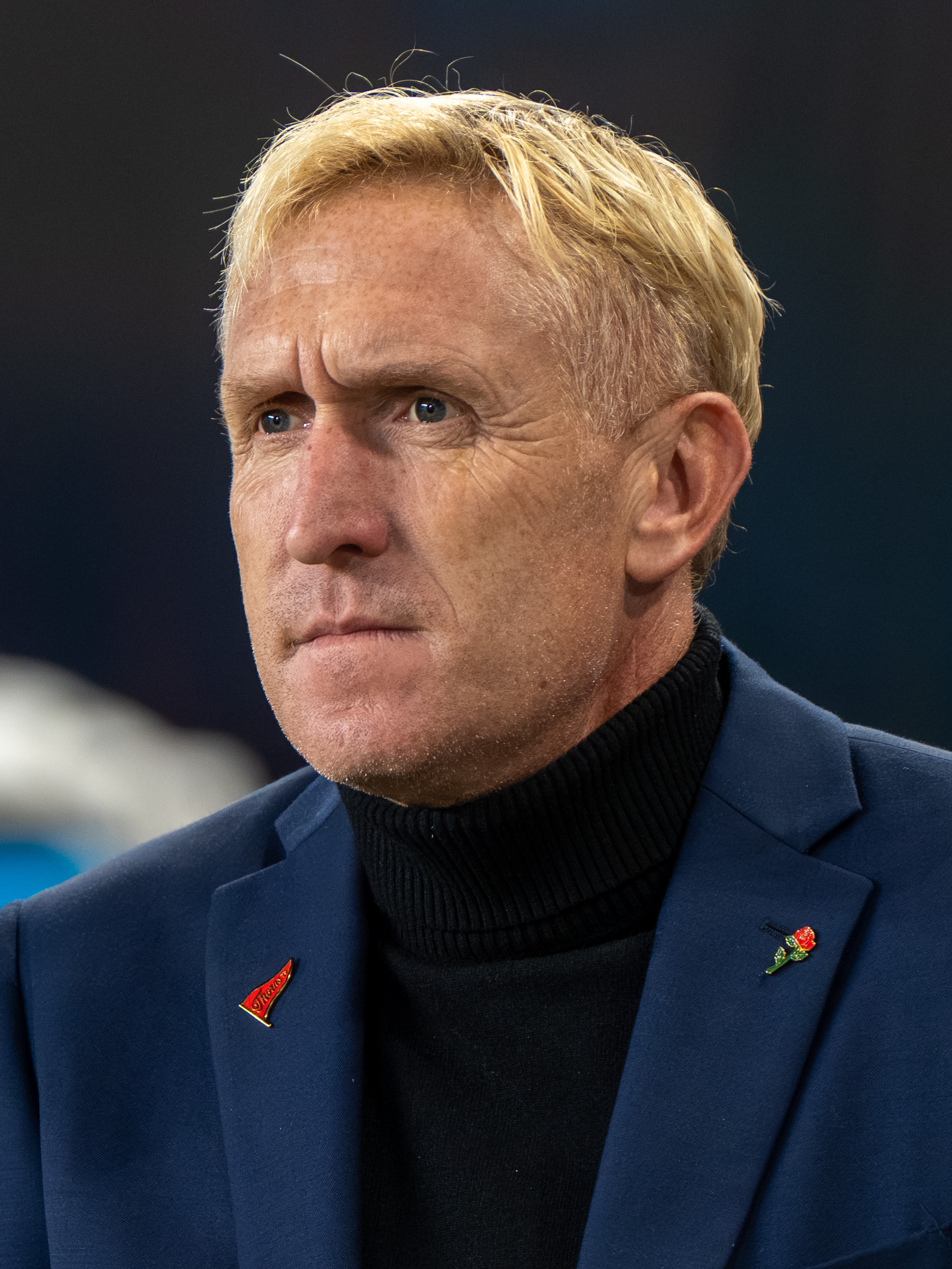
- Gale with the Portland Thorns in 2025

Personal information
- Full name: Robert Peter Tabo Gale
- Date of birth: 3 August 1977 (age 49)
- Place of birth: Zambia
- Position: Midfielder

Youth career
- 1991–1994: Fulham

Senior career*
Years	Team	Apps	(Gls)
2001	Winnipeg Alliance		
2002–2008	Winnipeg Lucania		
2009–2012	Sons of Italy		

Managerial career
- 2010–2013: Canada U17 (assistant)
- 2011–2013: Canada U16
- 2012–2015: Canada U18
- 2014–2018: Canada U20
- 2018–2021: Valour FC
- 2023–2024: Portland Thorns FC (assistant)
- 2024–2025: Portland Thorns FC
- * Club domestic league appearances and goals

Robert Peter Tabo Gale (born 3 August 1977) is an English former professional footballer and coach. He served as the head coach for Portland Thorns FC in the American National Women's Soccer League (NWSL).

As a player, Gale began his career in England with Fulham before taking a break to focus on his coaching qualifications. He later appeared for Canadian clubs Winnipeg Alliance, Winnipeg Lucania and Sons of Italy. Gale has also coached the Canada national team from Under-16 to Under-20, and became the first head coach and general manager of Valour FC in June 2018. On 23 September 2021, the club announced that Gale would be relieved of his duties. He then served as a coach with New York City FC's academy. On July 14, 2026, it was announced that the Northern Super League's expansion team for the 2027 season would be based in Winnipeg, with Gale as its co-founder alongside Desiree Scott.

== Playing career ==
Gale was signed by Football League Third Division club Fulham as an associate schoolboy aged 14. After moving to Bedfordshire to study at university, he trained with Football League Second Division side Wycombe Wanderers for a year.

After an injury ruled Gale out for a full season and he graduated from university, he turned his attention to coaching and earned qualifications in England and the United States. Upon moving to Canada in 2001, Gale resumed his playing career and was named captain of indoor professional club the Winnipeg Alliance. He later played for Winnipeg Lucania and the Sons of Italy before retiring in 2012.

== Coaching career ==
=== Early career ===
Initially working as a director for summer camps across the United States and the Ian Rush Finishing Schools, Gale became the director of soccer at Spencer High School in Iowa in 2001. After two years, he became director for a North American academy run by Fulham, and later became the Canada national director for Charlton Athletic's sports academy.

=== Canada Soccer ===
In 2006, Gale was named technical director for the Manitoba Soccer Association. In 2010, he became assistant coach for the Canada U17 men's national team and saw the team qualify for successive FIFA Under-17 World Cup tournaments. In 2011, he came up against brother-in-law John Peacock, who was managing the England U17 national team. Later that year, he was named head coach for the Canada U16 men's national team, and in 2012 and became head coach of the Canada U18 men's national team.

In March 2014, Gale took over as the head coach of the Canada U20 men's national team.

=== Valour FC ===
On 26 June 2018, Gale was announced as the first head coach and general manager of Canadian Premier League club Valour FC. He was relieved from his duties on 23 September 2021.

=== Portland Thorns FC ===
On 23 March 2023, Portland Thorns FC appointed Gale as an assistant coach under head coach Mike Norris. In April 2024, the Thorns named Gale interim head coach following Norris's promotion to technical director of the Thorns. On 19 July 2024, the Thorns appointed Gale as the permanent head coach after winning eight of his twelve games as interim coach.

The Thorns proceeded to win only two of the following ten regular season matches after Gale's permanent appointment, losing seven of them, to finish tied with the club's lowest league finish at sixth place. The club qualified for the NWSL playoffs but were eliminated in the first round by NJ/NY Gotham FC. The Thorns also finished second in Group B of the 2024-25 CONCACAF W Champions Cup group stage under Gale and qualified for the semifinals.

On Nov. 25, 2025, the Thorns announced that Gale and the club had agreed to part ways, with assistant coach Sarah Lowdon to serve as interim head coach.

=== Winnipeg NSL Franchise ===
In July 2026, it was announced that Winnipeg had been awarded an expansion franchise, later named Winnipeg Ember FC, in the Northern Super League, with Gale as a co-founder alongside fromer Canadian international Desiree Scott. Gale was announced to be the team's Chief Sporting Officer.

== Personal life ==
Gale was born in Zambia to English parents while his father was working as a football coach. He also spent part of his childhood growing up in Tanzania before moving to England aged five. Living in Horley, Surrey, he attended Oakwood School and Reigate College before studying media production and broadcast journalism at the University of Luton.

In 2000, Gale visited Winnipeg, Manitoba for work and met his future wife Erin. After moving to Winnipeg permanently a year later, Gale and his partner married in 2003 and now have two daughters. Five members of his family have UEFA coaching licences, including brother-in-law John Peacock.

He is a lifelong Arsenal supporter.

== Managerial statistics ==
As of 25 November 2025

Managerial record by team and tenure
Team	From	To	Record							
Team	From	To	P	W	D	L	GF	GA	GD	Win %
Valour FC	26 June 2018	23 September 2021	57	18	8	31	62	84	−22	31.58
Portland Thorns FC	16 April 2024	25 November 2025	64	28	11	25	98	78	+20	43.75
Total			121	46	19	56	169	162	+7	38.02
