= Lucy Rushton =

English football manager and sports analyst (born 1985)

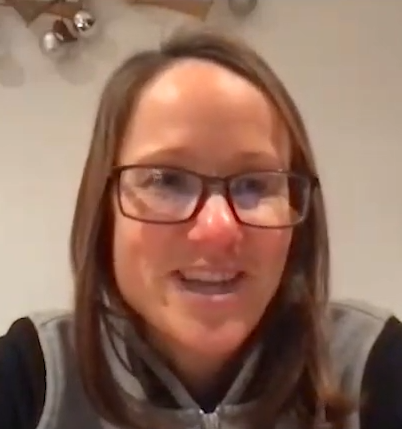
- Rushton in 2023

Personal information
- Date of birth: June 1, 1985 (age 41)

Team information
- Current team: Portland Thorns (special advisor to general manager)

Managerial career
- Years: Team
- 2021–2022: D.C. United (general manager)
- 2023–2024: Bay FC (general manager)
- 2025–: Portland Thorns (special advisor to general manager)

Lucy Rushton (born 1 June 1985) is an English football manager and sports analyst who serves as a special advisor to National Women's Soccer League (NWSL) club Portland Thorns FC. She previously served as general manager of NWSL club Bay FC and Major League Soccer (MLS) team D.C. United, where she was the league's second-ever woman to hold the title, and as head of technical recruitment and sports analysis for MLS team Atlanta United FC, first-team analyst and head of technical scouting for EFL Championship and Premier League club Reading F.C., and a player recruitment analyst Premier League club Watford F.C.

== Early life ==
Rushton grew up in Reading, Berkshire, England, and attended Waingels College in Woodley. She had been a season-ticket holder of Reading F.C. She earned a bachelor's degree in sports leadership from University of Reading on a dissertation about the notational analysis of football matches, and a master's degree in sports performance analysis from the University of Wales Institute.

== Analyst career ==
Rushton worked as a player recruitment analyst for Watford during its time in the Premier League in 2007, where she worked alongside scout Mick Court, later chief technical scout of Manchester United. She also worked as a part-time team analyst for The FA.

=== Reading, 2008–2016 ===
Rushton moved to Reading to serve as a first-team sports analyst in 2008, providing analysis of match actions and player performances by both Reading and its opponents to the club's players, coaches, and managers. She also provided video analysis to players and assumed scouting duties. The team won the 2011–12 Football League Championship and earned promotion to the Premier League, but were relegated after the 2012–13 Premier League season. She later became head of technical scouting at the club.

While at Reading, Rushton worked alongside Nick Hammond, who was later appointed head of football operations at Celtic F.C.

=== Atlanta United, 2016–2020 ===
MLS club Atlanta United FC hired Rushton in January 2016 as the team's head of technical recruitment and analysis, in order to prepare for its inaugural season as an expansion team. She reported to team president Darren Eales and technical director Carlos Bocanegra. Her analysis contributed to the club signing Hector Villalba as its first Designated Player and also credited with scouting Miguel Almirón. She was also credited with recruiting players Emerson Hyndman and Brad Guzan. Atlanta became the third expansion side to reach the MLS Cup Playoffs in its first season, and won the MLS Cup in its second season. She also provided analysis before and after matches for both the first-team and academy.

She was the only woman on the team's 20-person technical staff as of 2020. Initially also tasked with scouting, by 2020 Atlanta had narrowed Rushton's focus to data analysis, including creating player recruitment profiles by performance on club targets, contract status, and transfer value.

== Management career ==
=== D.C. United, 2021–2022 ===
In 2021, MLS team D.C. United hired Rushton as its general manager. The hiring was the second of a woman to the role in league history, and considered the first such hiring in the league on football management merit; Lynne Meterparel, the first woman hired as a MLS general manager for San Jose Clash in 1999, was primarily tasked with the club's business responsibilities. Rushton was hired to work alongside club sporting director Dave Kasper, who had served as the team's general manager since 2007.

D.C. United fired Rushton in October 2022 after the team finished in last place.

=== Bay FC, 2023–2024 ===
On 15 June 2023, NWSL expansion club Bay FC hired Rushton as its first general manager. Her tenure ended in June 2024, 14 games into the club's inaugural season, for undisclosed reasons.

=== Portland Thorns FC, 2025– ===
On 7 January 2025, NWSL club Portland Thorns FC announced Rushton's hiring as a special advisor to new general manager Jeff Agoos.

== Style of management ==
Rushton adapts her analysis to align with club or manager priorities, including designing systems based on statistical data and video analysis that weigh player performances according to their styles and coaches' preferences. As a general manager, her MLS clubs adopted aggressively attacking football. Atlanta's team included Josef Martínez, who won the MLS Golden Boot as top goalscorer in 2018.
