= 2024 National Women's Soccer League season =

12th season of the National Women's Soccer League

National Women's Soccer League
- Season: 2024
- Dates: March 16 – November 23
- Champions: Orlando Pride (1st title)
- NWSL Shield: Orlando Pride (1st shield)
- Challenge Cup: San Diego Wave FC (1st cup)
- CONCACAF W Champions Cup: NJ/NY Gotham FC; Orlando Pride; Washington Spirit
- Matches: 182
- Goals: 484 (2.66 per match)
- Top goalscorer: Temwa Chawinga (20)
- Biggest home win: 6 goals ORL 6–0 UTA (Jun 21)
- Biggest away win: 3 goals POR 1–4 KC (Jun 23); SD 0–3 CHI (Jun 28); LA 0–3 ORL (Jun 30); SD 1–4 NC (Sep 8)
- Highest scoring: 9 goals KC 5–4 POR (Mar 16)
- Longest winning run: 8 wins Orlando Pride (April 12 – June 7)
- Longest unbeaten run: 23 matches Orlando Pride (Mar 16 – Oct 11)
- Longest winless run: 12 matches San Diego Wave FC (May 12 – Sep 8)
- Longest losing run: 6 losses Utah Royals (May 3 – Jun 16)
- Highest attendance: 35,038; CHI 1–2 BAY (June 8)
- Lowest attendance: 2,137; LOU 1–3 SD (Nov 3)
- Total attendance: 2,044,848
- Average attendance: 11,235
- All statistics correct as of November 3, 2024.

The 2024 National Women's Soccer League season was the twelfth season of the National Women's Soccer League, the top division of women's soccer in the United States. Including the NWSL's two professional predecessors, Women's Professional Soccer (2009–2011) and the Women's United Soccer Association (2001–2003), it was the 18th overall season of FIFA and USSF-sanctioned top division women's soccer in the United States. The league had 14 teams following the addition of expansion teams Bay FC and Utah Royals—the latter being the revival of a team that had played in the league from 2018 to 2020.

The season began with the 2024 NWSL Challenge Cup, a supercup match between the reigning playoff champion (NJ/NY Gotham FC) and NWSL Shield winner San Diego Wave FC, on March 15, 2024. The regular season began the following day and ran until November 3; it paused for a month between July 8 and August 18 for the 2024 Summer Olympics. Each team played 26 matches during the regular season, an increase of four from the 2023 season. The playoffs comprised the top eight teams and ran from November 9 to November 23. The Orlando Pride finished in first place during the regular season, accumulating a record 60 points, and also won the playoffs, defeating the Washington Spirit in the final.

In addition to league play, 2024 marked the debut of the NWSL x Liga MX Femenil Summer Cup, an international competition between clubs from the NWSL and Liga MX Femenil of Mexico. The inaugural edition was played from July to October and won by the Kansas City Current.

The 2024 season was the first under new broadcast agreements with CBS Sports, ESPN, Amazon Prime Video and Scripps Sports; 118 of the total 182 matches were televised or streamed nationally. Attendance averaged 11,235 per game, a record, and total attendance for the year was just over two million, also a record.

== Teams, stadiums, and personnel ==
=== Stadiums and locations ===
Team	Stadium	Capacity
Angel City FC	BMO Stadium	22,000
Bay FC	PayPal Park	18,000
Chicago Red Stars	SeatGeek Stadium	20,000
Houston Dash	Shell Energy Stadium	22,039
Kansas City Current	CPKC Stadium	11,500
NJ/NY Gotham FC	Red Bull Arena	25,000
North Carolina Courage	WakeMed Soccer Park	10,000
Orlando Pride	Inter&Co Stadium	25,500
Portland Thorns FC	Providence Park	25,218
Racing Louisville FC	Lynn Family Stadium	11,700 (Note: Seated capacity; full capacity with standing room is 15,304.)
San Diego Wave FC	Snapdragon Stadium	35,000
Seattle Reign FC	Lumen Field	10,000 (Note: Lumen Field has a capacity of 68,740; standard configuration for Reign games seats 10,000 but can expand based on demand for individual games.)
Utah Royals	America First Field	20,213
Washington Spirit	Audi Field	20,000

Locations of the National Women's Soccer League teams in 2024.

=== Personnel and sponsorship ===
Note: All teams use Nike as their kit manufacturer as part of a league-wide sponsorship agreement renewed in November 2021.

Team	Head coach	Captain(s)	Shirt sponsor
Angel City FC	(England) Becki Tweed	(New Zealand) Ali Riley	DoorDash
Bay FC	(United States) Albertin Montoya	(United States) Emily Menges	Sutter Health
Chicago Red Stars	(Jamaica) Lorne Donaldson	(United States) Alyssa Naeher	Wintrust
Houston Dash	(England) Ricky Clarke (interim)	(Canada) Sophie Schmidt	MD Anderson Cancer Center
Kansas City Current	(North Macedonia) Vlatko Andonovski	(United States) Lo'eau LaBonta	United Way of Greater Kansas City
NJ/NY Gotham FC	(Spain) Juan Carlos Amorós	(United States) Lynn Williams	CarMax
North Carolina Courage	(United States) Sean Nahas	(Republic of Ireland) Denise O'Sullivan	Merz Aesthetics
Orlando Pride	(England) Seb Hines	(Brazil) Marta	Orlando Health
Portland Thorns FC	(England) Rob Gale	(United States) Becky Sauerbrunn	Providence Health & Services
Racing Louisville FC	(United States) Bev Yanez	(New Zealand) Abby Erceg	GE Appliances
San Diego Wave FC	(United States) Landon Donovan (interim)		Kaiser Permanente
Seattle Reign FC	(England) Laura Harvey	(United States) Lauren Barnes	Black Future Co-op Fund
Utah Royals	(Belgium) Jimmy Coenraets	(United States) Paige Monaghan	America First Credit Union
Washington Spirit	(Spain) Jonatan Giráldez	(United States) Aubrey Kingsbury	CVS Health

=== Coaching changes ===
Team	Outgoing coach	Manner of departure	Date of vacancy	Position in table	Incoming coach	Date of appointment	Ref.
Utah Royals	—N/a	—N/a	—N/a	Preseason	(United States) Amy Rodriguez	April 19, 2023	
Bay FC	—N/a	—N/a	—N/a	Preseason	(United States) Albertin Montoya	September 27, 2023	
Chicago Red Stars	(United States) Ella Masar (interim)	End of interim period	October 16, 2023	Preseason	(Jamaica) Lorne Donaldson	December 20, 2023	
Houston Dash	(England) Sarah Lowdon (interim)	End of interim period	October 16, 2023	Preseason	(Spain) Fran Alonso	December 22, 2023	
Kansas City Current	(Finland) Caroline Sjöblom (interim)	End of interim period	October 16, 2023	Preseason	(North Macedonia) Vlatko Andonovski	October 23, 2023	
Washington Spirit	(England) Mark Parsons	Fired	October 17, 2023	Preseason	(Spain) Adrián González (interim)	January 23, 2024	
Angel City FC	(England) Becki Tweed (interim)	End of interim period	October 21, 2023	Preseason	(England) Becki Tweed	November 2, 2023	
Racing Louisville FC	(Sweden) Kim Björkegren	Mutual separation	October 27, 2023	Preseason	(United States) Bev Yanez	November 30, 2023	
Portland Thorns FC	(England) Mike Norris	Promoted to technical director	April 16, 2024	14th	(England) Rob Gale (interim)	April 16, 2024	
San Diego Wave FC	(England) Casey Stoney	Fired	June 24, 2024	9th	(England) Paul Buckle (interim)	June 24, 2024	
Utah Royals	(United States) Amy Rodriguez	Fired	June 30, 2024	14th	(Belgium) Jimmy Coenraets (interim)	June 30, 2024	
Washington Spirit	(Spain) Adrián González (interim)	End of interim period	July 7, 2024 (Note: Although Giráldez was appointed on January 9, he would not join the Spirit until after the conclusion of the 2023–24 FC Barcelona Femení season. Giráldez officially assumed head-coaching duties on July 7, and González would remain on the Spirit's coaching staff as an assistant.)	3rd	(Spain) Jonatan Giráldez	January 9, 2024	
Portland Thorns FC	(England) Rob Gale (interim)	End of interim period	July 19, 2024	5th	(England) Rob Gale	July 19, 2024	
San Diego Wave FC	(England) Paul Buckle (interim)	End of interim period	August 16, 2024	10th	(United States) Landon Donovan (interim)	August 16, 2024	
Houston Dash	(Spain) Fran Alonso	Mutual separation	October 1, 2024	14th	(England) Ricky Clarke (interim)	June 28, 2024 (Note: Although the Dash and Alonso only agreed to part ways on October 1, Alonso had been absent and Clarke had been leading the team since June 28. However, the Dash did not make Clarke's interim appointment official until October 1.)	
Utah Royals	(Belgium) Jimmy Coenraets (interim)	End of interim period	October 24, 2024	10th	(Belgium) Jimmy Coenraets	October 24, 2024	

== Regular season ==
=== Standings ===
Pos	Team	Pld	W	D	L	GF	GA	GD	Pts	Qualification
1	Orlando Pride (C, S)	26	18	6	2	46	20	+26	60	NWSL Shield, playoffs, and CONCACAF W Champions Cup
2	Washington Spirit	26	18	2	6	51	28	+23	56	Playoffs, and CONCACAF W Champions Cup
3	NJ/NY Gotham FC	26	17	5	4	41	20	+21	56	Playoffs, and CONCACAF W Champions Cup (Note: With Orlando Pride winning both the 2024 National Women's Soccer League Championship and 2024 National Women's Soccer League Shield, the third qualifying spot for the United States went to the next best club in 2024 National Women's Soccer League Shield standings not already qualified, Gotham FC.)
4	Kansas City Current	26	16	7	3	57	31	+26	55	Playoffs
5	North Carolina Courage	26	12	3	11	34	28	+6	39	Playoffs
6	Portland Thorns FC	26	10	4	12	37	35	+2	34	Playoffs
7	Bay FC	26	11	1	14	31	41	−10	34	Playoffs
8	Chicago Red Stars	26	10	2	14	31	38	−7	32	Playoffs
9	Racing Louisville FC	26	7	7	12	33	39	−6	28	
10	San Diego Wave FC	26	6	7	13	24	35	−11	25	
11	Utah Royals	26	7	4	15	22	40	−18	25	
12	Angel City FC	26	7	6	13	29	42	−13	24 (Note: Angel City FC were deducted three points for breaching spending cap rules.)	
13	Seattle Reign FC	26	6	5	15	27	44	−17	23	
14	Houston Dash	26	5	5	16	20	42	−22	20	

Source: NWSL
Rules for classification: Tiebreakers
(C) Champions and W Champions Cup; (S) NWSL Shield

==== Tiebreakers ====
The initial determining factor for a team's position in the standings is most points earned, with three points earned for a win, one point for a draw, and zero points for a loss. If two or more teams tie in total points total when determining rank, playoff qualification, and seeding, the NWSL uses the following tiebreaker criteria, going down the list until all teams are ranked.

1. Greater goal difference across the entire regular season (against all teams, not just tied teams).
2. Most total wins across the entire regular season (against all teams, not just tied teams).
3. Most goals scored across the entire regular season (against all teams, not just tied teams).
4. Head-to-head results (total points) between the tied teams.
5. Head-to-head most goals scored between the tied teams.
6. Fewest disciplinary points accumulated across the entire regular season (against all teams, not just tied teams).
7. Coin flip (if two teams are tied) or drawing of lots (if three or more teams are tied).

=== Results ===
Home \ Away	BAY	CHI	HOU	KC	LA	LOU	NC	NJY	ORL	POR	SD	SEA	UTA	WAS
Bay FC	—	1–2	2–3	0–1	1–0	1–0	1–0	0–2	0–1	2–3	2–1	3–2	0–1	0–3
Chicago Red Stars	1–2	—	1–0	1–3	0–1	0–1	1–3	0–2	0–1	0–2	1–0	2–1	3–1	2–4
Houston Dash	2–3	0–2	—	1–1	0–0	0–0	3–0	0–1	0–1	0–2	0–0	1–0	1–3	1–3
Kansas City Current	5–2	2–2	2–0	—	4–2	3–3	1–0	1–1	1–2	5–4	4–1	5–2	1–0	3–0
Angel City FC	0–1	2–1	0–1	1–3	—	3–2	2–1	1–2	0–3	2–2	0–0	2–3	1–1	1–2
Racing Louisville FC	0–1	3–1	2–0	0–2	2–1	—	2–1	0–2	2–2	1–0	0–0	2–3	5–1	1–2
North Carolina Courage	1–1	3–1	5–1	2–1	1–1	3–1	—	1–0	0–0	2–0	2–1	1–0	1–0	0–1
NJ/NY Gotham FC	5–1	2–1	2–1	1–1	2–1	1–1	1–0	—	3–1	2–0	2–1	1–1	1–0	0–2
Orlando Pride	1–0	1–1	3–1	0–0	1–1	1–0	4–1	2–0	—	2–1	1–0	3–2	6–0	2–0
Portland Thorns FC	1–3	0–1	4–1	1–4	3–0	2–2	1–0	0–1	2–0	—	1–0	4–0	1–2	2–1
San Diego Wave FC	2–1	0–3	0–2	1–2	1–2	3–1	1–4	1–1	1–1	2–0	—	1–0	2–0	1–1
Seattle Reign FC	0–1	1–2	2–1	0–0	0–1	1–1	1–0	0–2	2–3	0–0	2–1	—	1–1	1–0
Utah Royals	2–1	0–2	0–0	0–1	1–2	1–0	2–1	1–4	0–1	0–0	1–2	3–0	—	0–1
Washington Spirit	2–1	2–0	3–0	4–1	4–2	4–1	0–1	2–0	2–3	2–1	1–1	3–2	2–1	—

Source: NWSL
Legend: Blue = home team win; Yellow = draw; Red = away team win.

=== Positions by week ===
Considering each week to end when the NWSL releases their weekly standing tweet

Team \ Week	1	2	3	4	5	6	7	8	9	10	11	12	13	14	15	16	17	18	19	20	21	22	23	24	25	26
Orlando Pride	6	9	8	5	5	4	1	2	1	1	2	2	2	2	2	1	1	1	1	1	1	1	1	1	1	1
Washington Spirit	12	6	4	3	2	3	3	3	3	3	3	3	3	3	3	3	2	2	2	2	2	2	2	2	2	2
NJ/NY Gotham FC	8	4	7	7	11	11	9	7	7	5	5	4	4	4	4	4	4	4	4	3	3	3	3	3	3	3
Kansas City Current	3	2	1	1	1	1	2	1	2	2	1	1	1	1	1	2	3	3	3	4	4	4	4	4	4	4
North Carolina Courage	1	3	3	2	4	2	6	6	6	7	8	7	6	6	6	6	6	5	5	5	5	5	5	5	5	5
Portland Thorns FC	10	14	13	14	9	7	4	4	4	4	4	5	5	5	5	5	5	6	6	6	7	7	7	7	7	6
Bay FC	5	7	10	6	8	10	12	13	11	12	10	12	11	11	8	8	10	8	7	8	9	8	8	8	8	7
Chicago Red Stars	2	1	2	4	3	5	5	5	5	6	6	6	7	7	7	7	7	7	8	7	6	6	6	6	6	8
Racing Louisville FC	7	10	9	9	6	6	8	11	10	8	7	8	8	8	9	9	8	10	11	9	8	9	9	9	9	9
San Diego Wave FC	9	13	6	8	10	8	10	8	8	9	9	9	9	9	10	10	11	12	12	12	12	10	10	12	13	10
Utah Royals	13	8	12	13	14	13	14	14	14	14	14	14	14	14	14	14	14	13	13	13	14	13	12	10	10	11
Angel City FC	11	11	14	10	7	9	7	9	9	11	12	11	10	10	11	11	9	9	9	10	10	11	11	11	11	12
Seattle Reign FC	4	5	11	12	13	14	11	12	13	13	13	13	13	13	13	13	12	11	10	11	11	12	13	13	12	13
Houston Dash	14	12	5	11	12	12	13	10	12	10	11	10	12	12	12	12	13	14	14	14	13	14	14	14	14	14

Legend: Gold = first place; green = playoff position; Red = last place.

== Attendance ==
=== Average home attendances ===
Ranked from highest to lowest average attendance.

Regular season
Team	GP	Attendance	High	Low	Average
San Diego Wave FC	12 (Note: San Diego's final home match on November 3 was moved to Louisville due to poor field conditions at Snapdragon Stadium.)	234,896	32,066	10,289	19,575
Angel City FC	13	251,073	22,000	16,023	19,313
Portland Thorns FC	13	243,428	23,212	16,688	18,725
Washington Spirit	13	181,187	19,897	8,182	13,937
Bay FC	13	177,027	18,000	10,367	13,617
Kansas City Current	13	149,500	11,500	11,500	11,500
Utah Royals	13	133,949	20,370	7,491	10,304
NJ/NY Gotham FC	13	111,660	11,662	5,883	8,589
Seattle Reign FC	13	110,536	16,598	5,083	8,503
Orlando Pride	13	108,424	17,087	4,702	8,340
Chicago Red Stars	13	93,030	35,038	2,999	7,156
Racing Louisville FC	14	86,916	11,365	2,137	6,208
North Carolina Courage	13	82,702	10,026	4,528	6,362
Houston Dash	13	80,520	8,600	4,438	6,194
Total	182	2,044,848	35,038	2,137	11,235

Updated through November 3

=== Highest attendances ===
Regular season
Rank	Home team	Score	Away team	Attendance	Date	Stadium
1	Chicago Red Stars	1–2	Bay FC	35,038	June 8, 2024	Wrigley Field
2	San Diego Wave FC	1–2	Kansas City Current	32,066	March 23, 2024	Snapdragon Stadium
3	San Diego Wave FC	1–4	North Carolina Courage	26,516	September 8, 2024	Snapdragon Stadium
4	San Diego Wave FC	3–0	Chicago Red Stars	24,115	June 28, 2024	Snapdragon Stadium
5	San Diego Wave FC	1–1	Washington Spirit	23,541	September 1, 2024	Snapdragon Stadium
6	Portland Thorns FC	3–0	Angel City FC	23,212	November 1, 2024	Providence Park
7	Angel City FC	0–1	Bay FC	22,000	March 17, 2024	BMO Stadium
7	Angel City FC	2–1	North Carolina Courage	22,000	April 21, 2024	BMO Stadium
7	Angel City FC	0–3	Orlando Pride	22,000	June 30, 2024	BMO Stadium
7	Angel City FC	2–2	Portland Thorns FC	22,000	September 23, 2024	BMO Stadium

Updated through November 2

== Statistical leaders ==
As of November 3, 2024.

=== Top scorers ===
Rank	Player	Club	Goals
1	(Malawi) Temwa Chawinga	Kansas City Current	20
2	(Zambia) Barbra Banda	Orlando Pride	13
3	(United States) Sophia Smith	Portland Thorns FC	12
4	(Spain) Esther González	NJ/NY Gotham FC	9
4	(Brazil) Marta	Orlando Pride	9
6	(United States) Bethany Balcer	2 teams	8
6	(United States) Trinity Rodman	Washington Spirit	8
6	(France) Ouleymata Sarr	Washington Spirit	8
9	(Scotland) Claire Emslie	Angel City FC	7
9	(United States) Ashley Hatch	Washington Spirit	7
9	(United States) Rose Lavelle	NJ/NY Gotham FC	7
9	(United States) Sydney Leroux	Angel City FC	7
9	(Nigeria) Asisat Oshoala	Bay FC	7
9	(United States) Ally Schlegel	Chicago Red Stars	7
9	(United States) Ella Stevens	NJ/NY Gotham FC	7
9	(United States) Mallory Swanson	Chicago Red Stars	7

=== Top assists ===
Rank	Player	Club	Assists
1	(United States) Croix Bethune	Washington Spirit	10
2	(United States) Alyssa Thompson	Angel City FC	7
3	(Zambia) Barbra Banda	Orlando Pride	6
3	(Malawi) Temwa Chawinga	Kansas City Current	6
3	(Brazil) Debinha	Kansas City Current	6
3	(United States) Vanessa DiBernardo	Kansas City Current	6
3	(United States) Trinity Rodman	Washington Spirit	6
3	(United States) Sophia Smith	Portland Thorns FC	6
9	(United States) Yazmeen Ryan	NJ/NY Gotham FC	5
9	(Mexico) María Sánchez	2 teams	5

=== Clean sheets ===
Rank	Player	Club	Clean sheets
1	(England) Anna Moorhouse	Orlando Pride	13
2	(United States) Shelby Hogan	Portland Thorns FC	9
3	(Germany) Ann-Katrin Berger	NJ/NY Gotham FC	8
3	(United States) Jane Campbell	Houston Dash	8
5	(United States) Aubrey Kingsbury	Washington Spirit	7
6	(United States) Casey Murphy	North Carolina Courage	6
6	(United States) Alyssa Naeher	Chicago Red Stars	6
6	(Canada) Kailen Sheridan	San Diego Wave FC	6
9	(United States) Katie Lund	Racing Louisville FC	5
9	(United States) Katelyn Rowland	Bay FC	5
9	(Germany) Almuth Schult	Kansas City Current	5

=== Hat-tricks ===
Player	For	Against	Score	Date	Ref.
(Canada) Cloé Lacasse	Utah Royals	vs. Seattle Reign FC	3–0	October 13, 2024	

== Playoffs ==
The NWSL increased the number of teams eligible for the NWSL playoffs from the top six teams to the top eight in the 2024 season. In the semifinals, teams were not reseeded and the winners within each quarterfinals arm played each other.

=== Bracket ===
Quarterfinals
1	Orlando Pride	4
8	Chicago Red Stars	1
4	Kansas City Current	1
5	North Carolina Courage	0
2	Washington Spirit	2
7	Bay FC	1
3	NJ/NY Gotham FC	2
6	Portland Thorns FC	1

Semifinals
1	Orlando Pride	3
4	Kansas City Current	2
2	Washington Spirit (p)	1 (3)
3	NJ/NY Gotham FC	1 (0)

Championship
1	Orlando Pride	1
2	Washington Spirit	0

=== Quarterfinals ===
November 8, 2024
8:00 pm EST

Orlando Pride	4–1	Chicago Red Stars
McCutcheon 25'; Banda 38', 45+3'; Marta 56' (pen.); Doyle (yellow card) 58'; Dyke (yellow card) 66'	Report	Joseph 59'

Inter&Co Stadium, Orlando, Florida
Attendance: 11,496
Referee: Alyssa Nichols
November 9, 2024
12:00 pm EST

Kansas City Current	1–0	North Carolina Courage
Chawinga 8'; LaBonta (yellow card) 28'; Wheeler (yellow card) 90+8'	Report	O'Sullivan (yellow card) 36'; St-Georges (yellow card) 90+8'

CPKC Stadium, Kansas City, Missouri
Attendance: 11,500
Referee: Brad Jensen
November 10, 2024
12:30 pm EST

Washington Spirit	2–1 (a.e.t.)	Bay FC
Hershfelt (yellow card) 46'; McKeown 86'; Dydasco 96' (o.g.)	Report	Oshoala (yellow card) 52'; Malonson (yellow card) 59'; Oshoala 82'; Pickett (yellow card) 99'

Audi Field, Washington, District of Columbia
Attendance: 19,215
Referee: Katja Koroleva
November 10, 2024
3:00 pm EST

NJ/NY Gotham FC	2–1	Portland Thorns FC
Davidson 67'; Carter (yellow card) 74'; Lavelle 90+7'	Report	Turner 75'

Red Bull Arena, Harrison, New Jersey
Attendance: 15,540
Referee: Danielle Chesky

=== Semifinals ===
November 16, 2024
12:00 pm EST

Washington Spirit	1–1 (a.e.t.)	NJ/NY Gotham FC
Hershfelt 90+3'; Krueger (yellow card) 97'; Rodman (yellow card) 102'	Report	Carter (yellow card) 17'; Sheehan (yellow card) 23'; González 56'; Bruninha (yellow card) 72' (yellow-red card) 101'; Nighswonger (yellow card) 90+2'; Zerboni (yellow card) 116'
Penalties
Hatch (penalty scored); Silano (penalty scored); McKeown (penalty scored)	3–0	(penalty missed) González; (penalty missed) Zerboni; (penalty missed) Nighswonger

Audi Field, Washington, District of Columbia
Attendance: 19,365
Referee: Matthew Thompson
November 17, 2024
3:00 pm EST

Orlando Pride	3–2	Kansas City Current
Angelina (yellow card) 28'; McCutcheon 41' (yellow card) 90+13'; Banda 53'; Moorhouse (yellow card) 81'; Marta 82'	Report	Debinha 33'; Mace (yellow card) 55'; Sharples (yellow card) 90+9'; DiBernardo 90+13' (pen.)

Inter&Co Stadium, Orlando, Florida
Attendance: 14,524
Referee: Danielle Chesky

=== Championship ===
November 23, 2024
8:00 pm EST

Orlando Pride	1–0	Washington Spirit
Banda 37'	Report

CPKC Stadium, Kansas City, Missouri
Attendance: 11,500
Referee: Alyssa Nichols

== Challenge Cup ==
In a change of format, the Challenge Cup will be played as a one-off super cup, contested by the winners of the previous season's NWSL Championship, NJ/NY Gotham FC, and NWSL Shield, San Diego Wave FC.

March 15, 2024
8:00 pm EDT

NJ/NY Gotham FC	0–1	San Diego Wave FC
	Report	Morgan 88'

Red Bull Arena, Harrison, New Jersey
Attendance: 14,241
Referee: Danielle Chesky

== NWSL x Liga MX Femenil Summer Cup ==
The inaugural Summer Cup was played from July to October. Kansas City Current defeated NJ/NY Gotham FC 2-0 in the final.

== Individual awards ==
As of November 24, 2024

=== Annual awards ===
Award	Winner		Nominees	Ref.
Golden Boot	(Malawi) Temwa Chawinga	Kansas City Current	N/A	
Most Valuable Player	(Malawi) Temwa Chawinga	Kansas City Current	(Zambia) Barbra Banda, Orlando Pride (Brazil) Marta, Orlando Pride (United States) Trinity Rodman, Washington Spirit (United States) Sophia Smith, Portland Thorns FC	
Defender of the Year	(United States) Emily Sams	Orlando Pride	(United States) Kaleigh Kurtz, North Carolina Courage (United States) Tara McKeown, Washington Spirit (United States) Naomi Girma, San Diego Wave FC (United States) Kylie Strom, Orlando Pride	
Midfielder of the Year	(United States) Croix Bethune	Washington Spirit	(United States) Vanessa DiBernardo, Kansas City Current (United States) Lo'eau LaBonta, Kansas City Current (Brazil) Marta, Orlando Pride (United States) Ashley Sanchez, North Carolina Courage	
Goalkeeper of the Year	(Germany) Ann-Katrin Berger	NJ/NY Gotham FC	(England) Anna Moorhouse, Orlando Pride (United States) Mandy Haught, Utah Royals	
Rookie of the Year	(United States) Croix Bethune	Washington Spirit	(United States) Ally Sentnor, Utah Royals (United States) Claire Hutton, Kansas City Current	
Coach of the Year	(England) Seb Hines	Orlando Pride	(Spain) Juan Carlos Amorós, NJ/NY Gotham FC; Vlatko Andonovski, Kansas City Current	

==== Teams of the Year ====
Best XI

Pos.	Player	Team
GK	Ann-Katrin Berger	NJ/NY Gotham FC
DF	Jenna Nighswonger	NJ/NY Gotham FC
DF	Kaleigh Kurtz	North Carolina Courage
DF	Emily Sams	Orlando Pride
DF	Casey Krueger	Washington Spirit
MF	Marta	Orlando Pride
MF	Croix Bethune	Washington Spirit
FW	Trinity Rodman	Washington Spirit
FW	Temwa Chawinga	Kansas City Current
FW	Barbra Banda	Orlando Pride
FW	Sophia Smith	Portland Thorns FC

Second XI

Pos.	Player	Team
GK	Anna Moorhouse	Orlando Pride
DF	Kerry Abello	Orlando Pride
DF	Naomi Girma	San Diego Wave FC
DF	Tara McKeown	Washington Spirit
DF	Ryan Williams	North Carolina Courage
MF	Lo'eau LaBonta	Kansas City Current
MF	Hal Hershfelt	Washington Spirit
MF	Vanessa DiBernardo	Kansas City Current
MF	Rose Lavelle	NJ/NY Gotham FC
MF	Yazmeen Ryan	NJ/NY Gotham FC
FW	Esther González	NJ/NY Gotham FC

=== Monthly awards ===
==== Player of the Month ====
Month	Player	Team	Ref.
March/April	(Brazil) Bia Zaneratto	Kansas City Current	
May	(Zambia) Barbra Banda	Orlando Pride	
June	(Malawi) Temwa Chawinga	Kansas City Current	
July	(United States) Ally Sentnor	Utah Royals	
August	(United States) Ella Stevens	NJ/NY Gotham FC	
September	(Malawi) Temwa Chawinga (2)	Kansas City Current	
October/November	(Malawi) Temwa Chawinga (3)	Kansas City Current	

==== Rookie of the Month ====
Month	Player	Team	Ref.
March/April	(United States) Croix Bethune	Washington Spirit	
May	(United States) Croix Bethune (2)	Washington Spirit	
June	(United States) Croix Bethune (3)	Washington Spirit	
July	(United States) Ally Sentnor	Utah Royals	
August	(United States) Croix Bethune (4)	Washington Spirit	
September	(United States) Kennedy Wesley	San Diego Wave FC	
October/November	(United States) Makenna Morris	Washington Spirit	

==== Team of the Month ====
Month	Goalkeeper	Defenders	Midfielders	Forwards	Ref.
March/April	(United States) Alyssa Naeher, CHI	(United States) Malia Berkely, NC; (United States) Naomi Girma, SD; (United States) Casey Krueger, WAS; (United States) Sam Staab, CHI	(United States) Croix Bethune, WAS; (United States) Vanessa DiBernardo, KC; (United States) Taylor Flint, LOU	(Malawi) Temwa Chawinga, KC; (United States) Sophia Smith, POR; (Brazil) Bia Zaneratto, KC	
May	(Germany) Ann-Katrin Berger, NJY	(United States) Jenna Nighswonger, NJY; (United States) Carson Pickett, LOU; (United States) Emily Sams, ORL; (United States) Sam Staab, CHI; (2)	(United States) Croix Bethune, WAS (2); (United States) Sam Coffey, POR; (United States) Savannah DeMelo, LOU	(Zambia) Barbra Banda, ORL; (France) Ouleymata Sarr, WAS; (United States) Sophia Smith, POR; (2)	
June	(England) Anna Moorhouse, ORL	(United States) Elizabeth Ball, KC; (United States) Casey Krueger, WAS (2); (United States) Jenna Nighswonger, NJY (2); (United States) Izzy Rodriguez, KC	(United States) Croix Bethune, WAS (3); (United States) Lo'eau LaBonta, KC; (United States) Rose Lavelle, NJY	(Zambia) Barbra Banda, ORL (2); (Malawi) Temwa Chawinga, KC (2); (United States) Mallory Swanson, CHI	
July	(United States) Cassie Miller, NJY	(United States) Kerry Abello, ORL; (United States) Madison Curry, LA; (United States) Sarah Gorden, LA; (United States) Meghan Klingenberg, POR	(Brazil) Debinha, KC; (United States) Lo'eau LaBonta, KC (2); (United States) Meredith Speck, NC	(United States) Kristen Hamilton, KC; (United States) Ashley Sanchez, NC; (United States) Ally Sentnor, UTA	
August	(Bosnia and Herzegovina) DiDi Haračić, LA	(United States) Kerry Abello, ORL (2); (United States) Abby Dahlkemper, BAY; (United States) Sarah Gorden, LA (2); (United States) Kylie Strom, ORL	(Brazil) Debinha, KC (2); (United States) Kayla Fischer, LOU; (United States) Lo'eau LaBonta, KC (3)	(Malawi) Temwa Chawinga, KC (3); (United States) Ella Stevens, NJY; (United States) Alyssa Thompson, LA	
September	(England) Anna Moorhouse, ORL (2)	(United States) Malia Berkely, NC (2); (United States) Abby Dahlkemper, BAY (2); (United States) Naomi Girma, SD (2); (United States) Emily Sams, ORL (2)	(United States) Lo'eau LaBonta, KC (4); (Brazil) Marta, ORL; (United States) Yazmeen Ryan, NJY	(Malawi) Temwa Chawinga, KC (4); (United States) Trinity Rodman, WAS; (United States) Alyssa Thompson, LA (2)	
October/ November	(Germany) Almuth Schult, KC	(United States) Abby Dahlkemper, BAY (3); (United States) Kaleigh Kurtz, NC; (United States) Emily Sams, ORL (3); (United States) Kayla Sharples, KC	(United States) Rose Lavelle, NJY (2); (United States) Yazmeen Ryan, NJY (2); (Spain) Claudia Zornoza, UTA	(Malawi) Temwa Chawinga, (5)KC; (Spain) Esther González, NJY; (United States) Makenna Morris, WAS	

=== Weekly awards ===
Week	Goal of the Week		Impact Save of the Week		Ref.
Week	Player	Club	Player	Club	Ref.
1	(Nigeria) Asisat Oshoala	Bay FC	(United States) Alyssa Naeher	Chicago Red Stars	
2	(South Korea) Ji So-yun	Seattle Reign FC	(Austria) Sarah Puntigam	Houston Dash	
3	(United States) Sam Coffey	Portland Thorns FC	(United States) Aubrey Kingsbury	Washington Spirit	
4	(United States) Alex Loera	Bay FC	(United States) Tatumn Milazzo	Chicago Red Stars	
5	(United States) Tziarra King	Seattle Reign FC	(United States) Tatumn Milazzo (2)	Chicago Red Stars	
6	(United States) Sophia Smith	Portland Thorns FC	(United States) Carson Pickett	Racing Louisville FC	
7	(United States) Veronica Latsko	Seattle Reign FC	(United States) Laurel Ivory	Seattle Reign FC	
8	(United States) Ella Stevens	NJ/NY Gotham FC	(United States) Kelli Hubly	Portland Thorns FC	
9	(United States) Emma Sears	Racing Louisville FC	(United States) Kiki Pickett	Bay FC	
10	(United States) Emma Sears (2)	Racing Louisville FC	(United States) Lauren Flynn	Utah Royals	
11	(United States) Rose Lavelle	NJ/NY Gotham FC	(United States) Mandy Haught	Utah Royals	
12	(United States) Croix Bethune	Washington Spirit	(Canada) Kailen Sheridan	San Diego Wave	
13	(United States) Trinity Rodman	Washington Spirit	(Bosnia and Herzegovina) DiDi Haračić	Angel City FC	
14	(United States) Mallory Swanson	Chicago Red Stars	(United States) Alyssa Naeher (2)	Chicago Red Stars	
15	(United States) Mallory Swanson (2)	Chicago Red Stars	(United States) Claudia Dickey	Seattle Reign FC	
16	(United States) Jameese Joseph	Chicago Red Stars	(Bosnia and Herzegovina) DiDi Haračić (2)	Angel City FC	
17	(South Korea) Ji So-yun (2)	Seattle Reign FC	(Australia) Mackenzie Arnold	Portland Thorns FC	
18	(Brazil) Marta	Orlando Pride	(Finland) Natalia Kuikka	Chicago Red Stars	
19	(United States) Trinity Rodman (2)	Washington Spirit	(Germany) Ann-Katrin Berger	NJ/NY Gotham FC	
20	(Japan) Yūki Nagasato	Houston Dash	(England) Anna Moorhouse	Orlando Pride	
21	(Spain) Ana Tejada	Utah Royals	(United States) Aubrey Kingsbury (2)	Washington Spirit	
22	(Japan) Manaka Matsukubo	North Carolina Courage	(United States) Kaleigh Kurtz	North Carolina Courage	
23	(United States) Christen Press	Angel City FC	(United States) Kayla Sharples	Kansas City Current	
24	(United States) Sydney Leroux	Angel City FC	(United States) Alyssa Naeher (3)	Chicago Red Stars	
25	(United States) Mandy Freeman	NJ/NY Gotham FC	(United States) Katie Lund	Racing Louisville FC	
