= Bay FC =

National Women's Soccer League team

- Full name: Bay Football Club
- Founded: April 4, 2023
- Stadium: PayPal Park; San Jose, California
- Capacity: 18,000
- Majority owner: Sixth Street Partners
- Co-Chairs: Alan Waxman; Aly Wagner
- General manager: Matt Potter
- Coach: Emma Coates
- League: NWSL
- 2026: Regular season: 14th of 16; Playoffs: DNQ
- Website: bayfc.com
| Home colors | Away colors | Third colors |

Bay Football Club is an American professional soccer team based in the San Francisco Bay Area that competes in the National Women's Soccer League (NWSL). The team began play in the NWSL as an expansion team in the 2024 season. Their home stadium is PayPal Park in San Jose, California, a soccer-specific stadium with 18,000 seats that is also home to the San Jose Earthquakes of Major League Soccer (MLS).

The ownership group, which is led by investment firm Sixth Street Partners and four former United States women's national team players, was awarded an expansion franchise on April 4, 2023. It is the first women's professional soccer team based in the Bay Area since the San Jose CyberRays and FC Gold Pride, who both played in previous leagues. Sixth Street CEO Alan Waxman and former national team player Aly Wagner were named the club's co-chairpersons. The team's name, Bay FC, and logo were announced on June 1, 2023.

== History ==
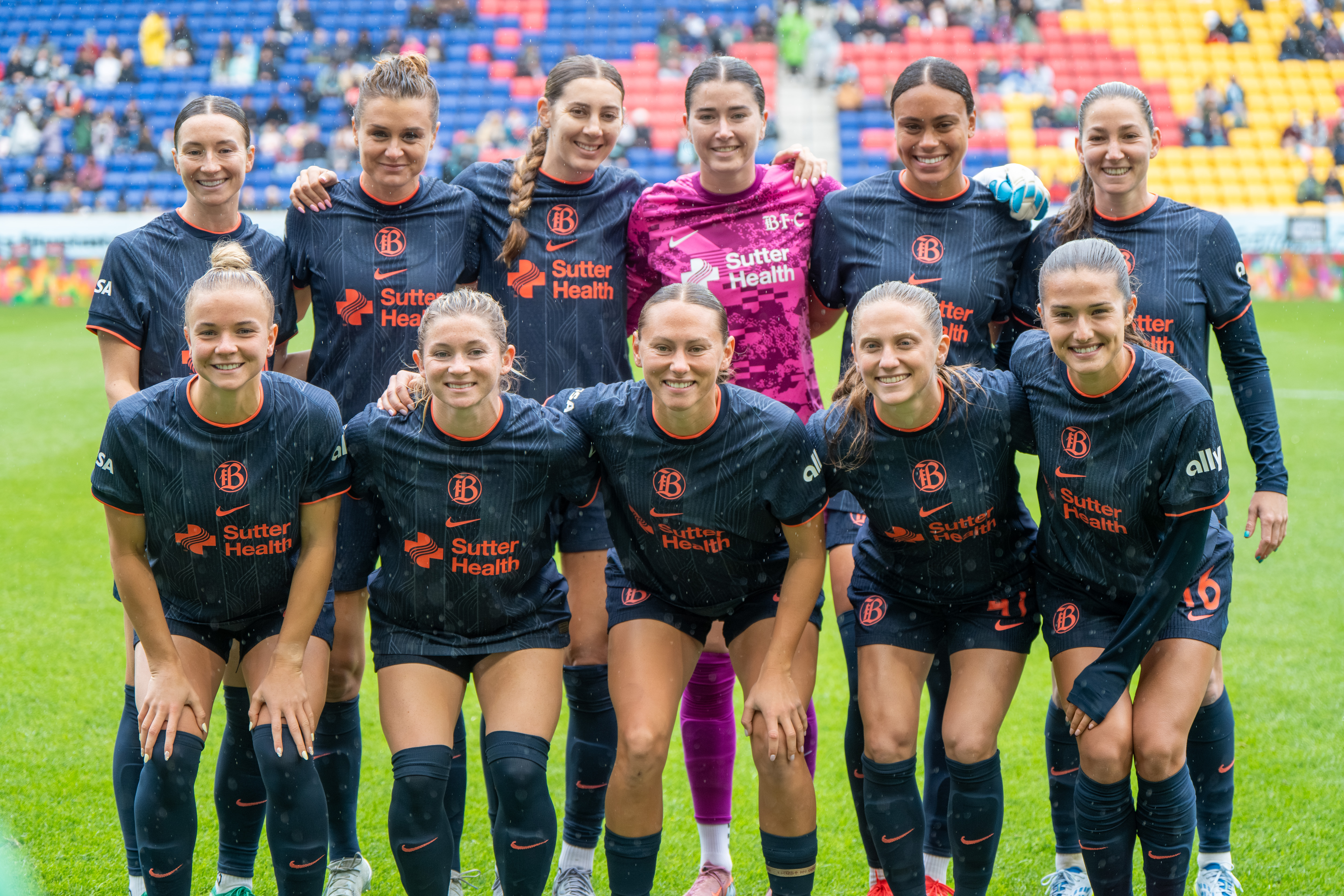
Bay FC Starting XI in 2026

=== Formation and expansion bid ===
The San Francisco Bay Area had previously hosted two professional women's soccer teams: the San Jose CyberRays of the Women's United Soccer Association and FC Gold Pride of Women's Professional Soccer.

In 2022, former United States women's national team (USWNT) and professional club players Brandi Chastain, Leslie Osborne, Danielle Slaton, and Aly Wagner announced the founding of a group called "NWSL to the Bay" that would lobby the NWSL for an expansion team in the San Francisco Bay Area. Their efforts to bring NWSL to the Bay started in 2020 just after Angel City in Los Angeles was founded by Kara Nortman, Natalie Portman, and Julie Uhrman. The groups bid would compete from groups in other cities, including Columbus, Ohio; Atlanta, Georgia; Austin, Texas; Cincinnati, Ohio; Toronto, Ontario; St. Louis, Missouri; and Nashville, Tennessee. In late 2022 that the NWSL had narrowed the second of its two 2024 expansion selections to the Bay Area bid, another bid in the former Boston Breakers market of Boston, Massachusetts, and a third bid in Tampa, Florida. By January 2023, further reports suggested that Tampa had been eliminated and that the Bay Area and Boston would both be awarded expansion teams, with expansion fees estimated at $50 million each. The league declined to confirm any reports prior to an official announcement. On April 4, 2023, the league formally awarded one of its two planned 2024 expansion teams to the Bay Area group at a reported $53 million expansion fee. Sixth Street committed an additional $72 million toward the club's launch, bringing its planned initial investment to approximately $125 million.

On September 27, 2023, Albertin Montoya was announced as the team's first head coach. On November 15, defender Alex Loera was revealed as the club's first ever signing, joining from the Kansas City Current for $175,000 in allocation money and protection from Bay FC in the 2024 Expansion Draft. Six days later, the club welcomed the 2021 Defender of the Year Caprice Dydasco as their second signing, the right back joining from the Houston Dash. On December 13, 2023, the club announced their full coaching staff, with Angela Salem and Jason Goodson brought in as assistant coaches, and Diego Restrepo as head of goalkeeping. Head coach Montoya had worked with Salem during his interim head coaching stint with the Washington Spirit in the 2022 NWSL season, and Restrepo had been head of goalkeeping at D.C. United while Bay FC general manager Lucy Rushton served as GM of the club.

On February 13, 2024, Bay FC signed Zambian forward Racheal Kundananji from Madrid CFF for $860,000, setting a new record for most expensive transfer in women's soccer history. The deal lasts until 2027, with an option to extend for another year.

On December 4, 2025, the club announced former England women's under-23 team manager Emma Coates as the new head coach. She replaced Albertin Montoya who announced in September he would resign at the end of the season. Bay had finished second from bottom in the 2025 season.

== Stadium ==
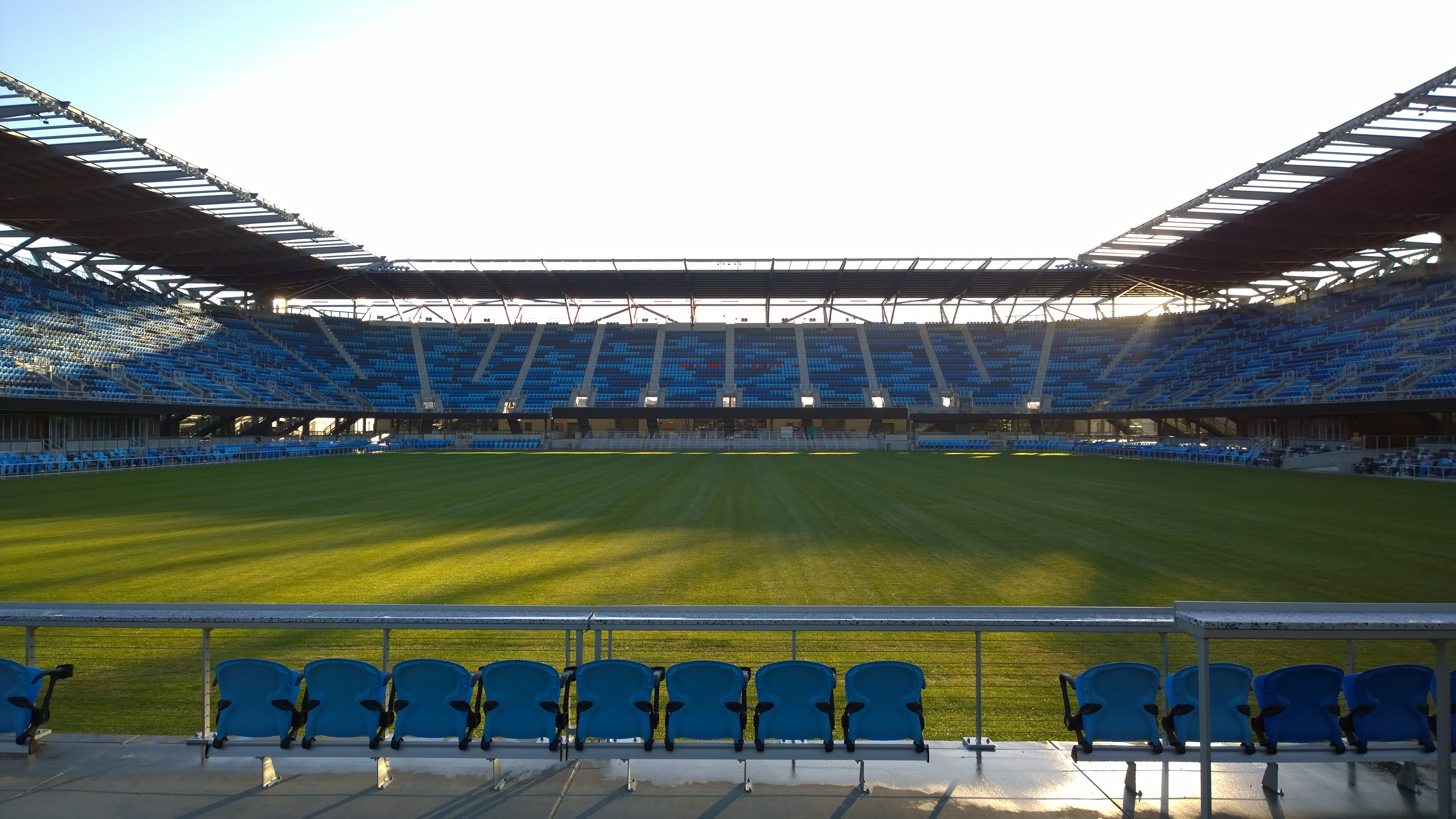
PayPal Park in 2015

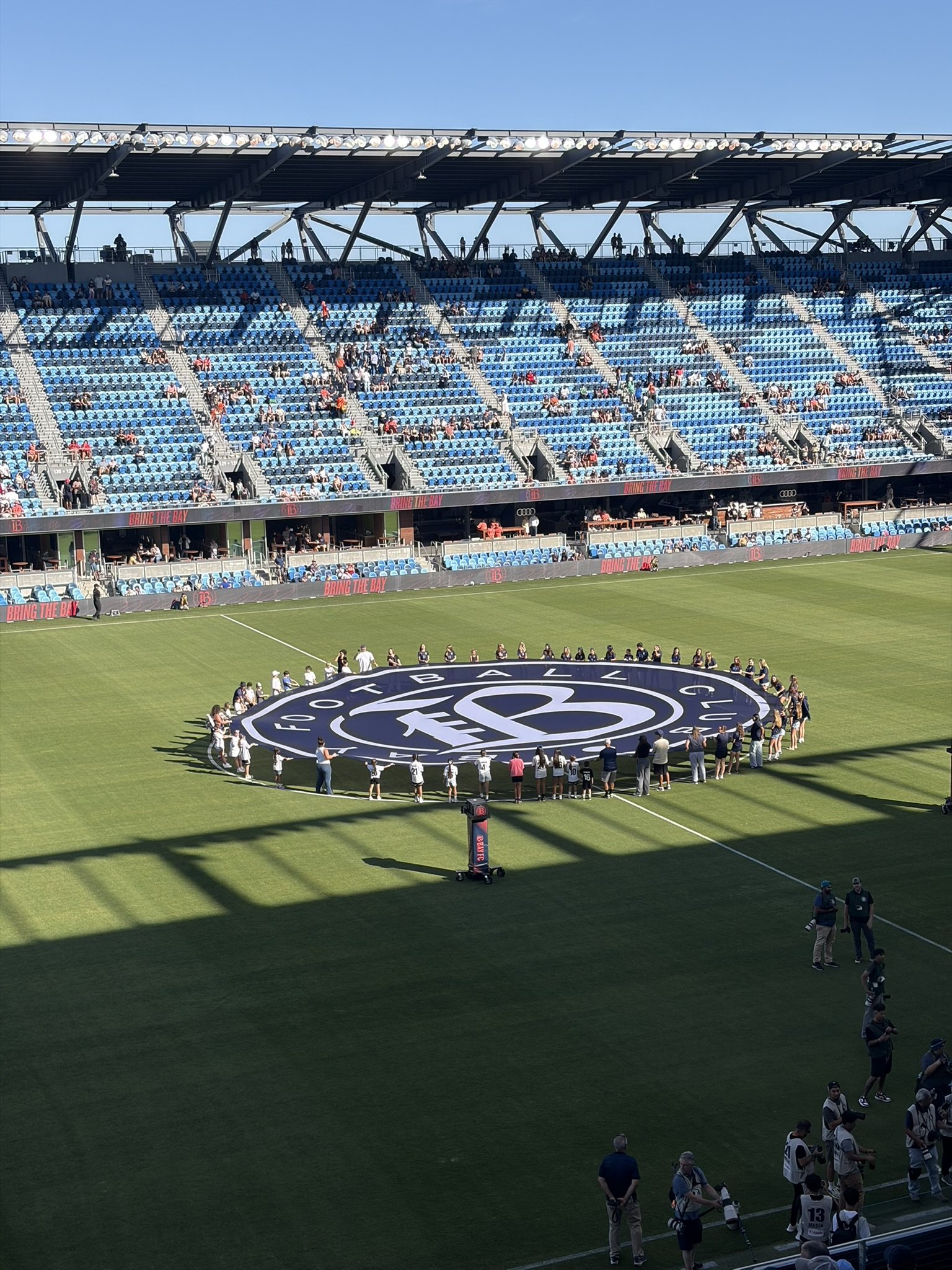
Start of a game in 2026

Bay FC was initially announced without a permanent stadium and drew interest from several cities in the Bay Area looking to host the team. A separate stadium for Bay FC has been proposed by the San Francisco government at several sites, including Pier 70 and the Westfield San Francisco Centre shopping mall.

On July 21, 2023, the team announced that they had signed a five-year agreement to play at PayPal Park in San Jose, the home of MLS's San Jose Earthquakes, while planning construction of their own stadium. A new, 3,600-square-foot (330 m^{2}) facility at the stadium would house the team's locker room and office spaces. Bay FC CEO Brady Stewart also suggested some of the team's matches might be played in other stadiums to make the team more accessible outside of the South Bay. In September 2025, the team broke ground on their performance center on Treasure Island.

== Ownership and investment group ==
The expansion announcement confirmed the involvement of Sixth Street Partners as the Bay Area group's lead investor. Chastain, Osborne, Slaton, and Wagner were named as founding board members alongside Sixth Street CEO Alan Waxman, former San Francisco Giants executive Staci Slaughter, former Facebook executive Sheryl Sandberg, and Golden State Warriors president and chief operating officer Rick Welts. Wagner and Waxman were announced as the club's co-chairpersons. Sandberg's husband Tom Bernthal was also listed as a club investor. At a launch event on June 3, Waxman announced that Andre Iguodala was also a minority owner.

The expansion fee was the league's largest to date, and 10 times the fee charged in the league's previous round of expansion in 2021. After the announcement, the Bay Area group also announced an additional $72 million in planned startup investment in the club, and Waxman said Sixth Street was committed to owning the franchise for at least 10 years.

The club would be the first professional sports team in the United States to have an institutional investor as a majority owner, in contrast to rules established by other United States sports leagues that restricted or prohibited such ownership. NWSL commissioner Jessica Berman noted that the investment did not have a target hold period, and was funded from Sixth Street Tao Partners, a balance sheet fund with no requirement to be liquidated, which the league intended to treat like an individual owner with a large net worth. The Tao fund also covered Sixth Street's purchase of a 20-percent stake in the NBA's San Antonio Spurs.

To mitigate the risks of a premature exit of Sixth Street, the league required as part of the expansion deal that Waxman provide assurances that he can allocate money to the club and also required him to represent the club on the NWSL board of governors. The club also named co-chair Wagner as an alternate representative to the league board.

Prior to Sixth Street, the original ownership group raised the initial capital adding Motley Fool and Anne Hoge to the board of directors. They joined Jen Vescio, Tim Connors, Ward Bullard, CJ Napolitano and David Aufhauser alongside the four former USWNT players to lead the early efforts to bring NWSL to the Bay.

=== Front office ===
On June 14, 2023, Bay FC announced the hiring of Brady Stewart, who had led direct-to-consumer business for Levi Strauss & Co., as the team's chief executive officer and first front-office hire. On June 15, the club announced the hiring of Lucy Rushton as the club's first general manager. Rushton had most recently been fired as general manager of Major League Soccer club D.C. United in October 2022. On July 18, the club announced the hiring of Golden State Warriors chief marketing officer Jen Millet as its chief operating officer.

== Colors and crest ==
The club revealed its colors and crest on June 1, 2023. The crest is a circle with a blackletter monographic B integrating a support of the Golden Gate Bridge. The club's primary colors are blue and warm red, described as Bay and Poppy, respectively. Its secondary colors are two shades of gray, described as Fog Gray and Steel.

Advertising agency Goodby Silverstein & Partners consulted on the club's identity and logo design. On the unveiling of the club's branding, Wagner noted that the club intentionally avoided nicknames and mascots in favor of a conceptual timelessness and simplicity.

== Players ==
=== Current squad ===
As of November 18, 2026

| No. | Pos. | Nation | Player |
|---|---|---|---|
| 2 | DF | USA | Heather Gilchrist |
| 4 | DF | ENG | Jess Carter |
| 5 | FW | USA | Karlie Lema |
| 7 | MF | USA | Taylor Huff |
| 8 | MF | USA | Claire Hutton |
| 10 | FW | ITA | Cristiana Girelli (on loan from Juventus) |
| 16 | DF | CAN | Sydney Collins |
| 17 | FW | USA | Alex Pfeiffer |
| 18 | MF | USA | Joelle Anderson |
| 19 | MF | USA | Dorian Bailey |
| 20 | DF | USA | Alyssa Malonson |
| 21 | DF | ARG | Aldana Cometti |
| 23 | MF | USA | Caroline Conti |
| 24 | DF | USA | Maddie Moreau |
| 25 | DF | ENG | Anouk Denton |
| 27 | FW | ENG | Keira Barry |
| 29 | GK | USA | Jordan Silkowitz |
| 30 | FW | ARG | Agostina Holzheier |
| 31 | DF | USA | Jenna Nighswonger |
| 32 | GK | USA | Emmie Allen |
| 41 | MF | USA | Hannah Bebar |
| 47 | MF | USA | Kennedy Fuller |

==== Out on loan ====
| No. | Pos. | Nation | Player |
|---|---|---|---|
| 6 | FW | USA | Onyeka Gamero (on loan to Dallas Trinity FC through December 31, 2026) |
| 14 | MF | USA | Jamie Shepherd (on loan to Dallas Trinity FC through December 31, 2026) |
| 22 | DF | CAN | Brooklyn Courtnall (on loan to San Diego Wave FC through December 31, 2026) |

=== Former players ===
For details of former players, see Category:Bay FC players and List of Bay FC players.

== Records ==
=== Year-by-year ===
| Season | League | Regular season | | | | | | | | | Playoffs | Challenge Cup | Average attendance | Total attendance |
| Season | League | P | W | D | L | GF | GA | GD | Pts | Pos | Playoffs | Challenge Cup | Average attendance | Total attendance |
|---|---|---|---|---|---|---|---|---|---|---|---|---|---|---|
| 2024 | NWSL | 26 | 11 | 1 | 14 | 31 | 41 | -10 | 34 | 7th | Quarter-final | DNQ | 13,617 | 177,027 |
| 2025 | NWSL | 26 | 4 | 8 | 14 | 26 | 41 | -15 | 20 | 13th | DNQ | DNQ | 14,823 | 192,695 |
| 2026 | NWSL | 30 | 7 | 6 | 17 | 30 | 47 | -17 | 27 | 14th | DNQ | DNQ | 12,126 | 181,896 |

=== Team records ===
As of November 20, 2026. Current players in bold. Statistics are updated once a year after the conclusion of the NWSL season.

Most appearances
| Player | | | | | Appearances | | | | |
| # | Name | Nat. | Pos. | Bay FC career | NWSL | Playoffs | Cup | Other | Total |
|---|---|---|---|---|---|---|---|---|---|
| 1 | **Dorian Bailey** | (United States) | MF | 2024– | 69 | 1 | 2 | 3 | 75 |
| 2 | **Joelle Anderson** | (United States) | MF | 2024– | 63 | 0 | 3 | 3 | 69 |
| 3 | Racheal Kundananji | (Zambia) | FW | 2024–2026 | 63 | 1 | 0 | 1 | 65 |
| 4 | **Maddie Moreau** | (United States) | DF | 2024– | 54 | 1 | 3 | 4 | 62 |
| 5 | **Caroline Conti** | (United States) | FW | 2024- | 53 | 0 | 2 | 4 | 59 |
| 6 | Caprice Dydasco | (United States) | DF | 2024–2026 | 51 | 1 | 3 | 3 | 58 |
| 7 | **Karlie Lema** | (United States) | FW | 2025- | 54 | 0 | 0 | 2 | 56 |
| 8 | **Alyssa Malonson** | (United States) | DF | 2024– | 48 | 1 | 3 | 3 | 55 |
| 9 | **Jordan Silkowitz** | (United States) | GK | 2024- | 53 | 0 | 0 | 1 | 54 |
| 10 | Tess Boade | (United States) | MF | 2024-2026 | 46 | 1 | 1 | 4 | 52 |

Top goalscorers
| Player | | | | | Goals | | | | |
| # | Name | Nat. | Pos. | Bay FC career | NWSL | Playoffs | Cup | Other | Total |
|---|---|---|---|---|---|---|---|---|---|
| 1 | Racheal Kundananji | (Zambia) | FW | 2024–2026 | 12 | 0 | 0 | 1 | 13 |
| 2 | **Karlie Lema** | (United States) | FW | 2025– | 10 | 0 | 0 | 0 | 10 |
| 3 | Asisat Oshoala | (Nigeria) | FW | 2024–2025 | 7 | 1 | 0 | 1 | 9 |
| 4 | Penelope Hocking | (United States) | FW | 2024–2025 | 6 | 0 | 0 | 2 | 8 |
| 5 | **Caroline Conti** | (United States) | MF | 2024– | 5 | 0 | 0 | 2 | 7 |
| 6 | **Taylor Huff** | (United States) | MF | 2025– | 6 | 0 | 0 | 0 | 6 |
| 7 | **Joelle Anderson** | (United States) | MF | 2024– | 5 | 0 | 0 | 0 | 5 |
| 8 | **Dorian Bailey** | (United States) | MF | 2024- | 3 | 0 | 1 | 0 | 4 |
| 9 | **Alex Pfeiffer** | (United States) | FW | 2026- | 3 | 0 | 0 | 0 | 3 |
| 9 | Tess Boade | (United States) | MF | 2024–2026 | 3 | 0 | 0 | 0 | 3 |
| 9 | Rachel Hill | (United States) | FW | 2024–2025 | 3 | 0 | 0 | 0 | 3 |
| 9 | Kiki Pickett | (United States) | MF | 2024–2025 | 3 | 0 | 0 | 0 | 3 |

== Managers ==
As of April 4, 2026:

| Name | Tenure | Refs |
|---|---|---|
| (United States) Albertin Montoya | September 27, 2023 – November 2, 2025 | |
| (England) Emma Coates | December 4, 2025 – | |

== See also ==
- NWSL expansion
