= Albertin Montoya =

Cuban soccer player (born 1975)

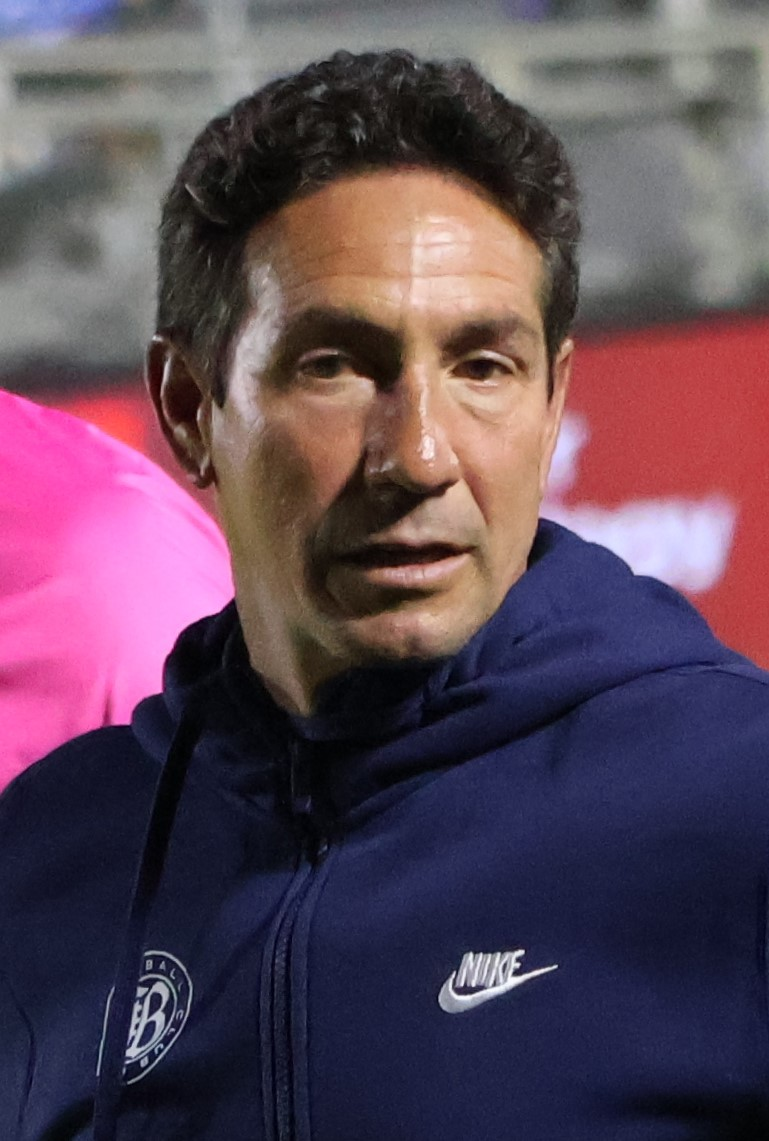
- Montoya with Bay FC in 2024

Personal information
- Full name: Alberto Montoya
- Date of birth: February 19, 1975 (age 51)
- Place of birth: Camagüey, Cuba
- Height: 5 ft 6 in (1.68 m)
- Position: Midfielder

Youth career
- MVLA SC

College career
Years	Team	Apps	(Gls)
1993–1995	NC State Wolfpack		
1996	Santa Clara Broncos		

Senior career*
Years	Team	Apps	(Gls)
1995	San Francisco United All Blacks		
1997–1998	San Jose Clash	1	(0)
1997	→ Raleigh Flyers (loan)	24	(3)

International career
1991	United States U17	1	(1)
- United States U20
- United States U23

Managerial career
- 1999–2006: California Storm (co-head coach)
- 2005–2007: Santa Clara (assistant)
- 2008: United States U18 (assistant)
- 2008–2009: Stanford (assistant)
- 2009–2010: FC Gold Pride
- 2011–2012: United States U17
- 2022: Washington Spirit (interim)
- 2024–2025: Bay FC
- * Club domestic league appearances and goals

Albertin Montoya (born February 19, 1975) is a soccer coach and former player. He was a midfielder in his playing career. Born in Cuba, he represented the United States internationally at youth levels.

== Youth and college ==
Montoya played at Mountain View Los Altos Soccer Club for a decade, coached by his father. Montoya played for North Carolina State for his first three college seasons, earning Atlantic Coast Conference First Team selections in 1994 and 1995. He transferred to Santa Clara University for the 1996 school year, earning West Coast Conference First Team selection as well as finalist nominations for the Hermann Trophy and Missouri Athletic Club player of the year awards for his senior season, where he led the Broncos to their first ever outright WCC Championship.

== Club career ==
In 1995, Montoya started his playing career with the San Francisco United All Blacks in the 1995 USISL Premier League season. After his time in college, Montoya was selected fourth overall in the 1997 MLS College Draft by the San Jose Clash. He spent two seasons with the club, the first on loan in the 1997 USISL A-League season with the Raleigh Flyers. Albertin was out of contract after his initial season, but was picked up by the Clash in the 1998 MLS Supplemental Draft. In his second Clash season he made his first MLS appearance, though he suffered a serious knee injury in the match which effectively ended his career, taking three years of recovery and multiple surgeries.

== International career ==
Montoya featured for multiple United States youth national teams, earning call ups at the U17, U20, and U23 levels. Montoya was part of the United States squad at the 1991 FIFA U-17 World Championship. He had one appearance in the tournament, starting and scoring in a 3–1 win over China in the United States' final group stage match.

== Coaching career ==
=== Early coaching career ===
Montoya's club coaching career began in 1999 when he became co-head coach of the Sacramento Storm, a role which he held until 2006. In 2003, he gained his introduction to professional women's soccer as an assistant trainer with the San Jose CyberRays of the WUSA, in the league's final season. Montoya would take on his first collegiate coaching role in 2005 at his alma mater Santa Clara University, joining as an assistant coach for the Santa Clara Broncos women's soccer team.

=== Professional coaching career ===
Montoya's first professional head coaching role was with FC Gold Pride in Women's Professional Soccer. The club joined the league as a late founding club, having initially been planned to join as an expansion the following year. The team finished the 2009 WPS season in last place out of seven clubs. The following year the team reversed their fortunes by winning the double, finishing first place in the regular season as well as winning the 2010 WPS Championship. Montoya earned a finalist nomination for 2010 FIFA Women's World Coach of the Year. The club folded just a couple months after the season ended, and Montoya was free to find another coaching position.

As head coach, Montoya led the United States women's national under-17 soccer team from 2011 to 2012.

He was the interim head coach of the Washington Spirit late in the National Women's Soccer League 2022 season.

On September 27, 2023, NWSL expansion team Bay FC announced Montoya had been appointed as the team's first head coach. Montoya had initially been a consultant in finding a head coach but was ultimately selected by the organization for the role. In the 2024 season, his first as head coach, Montoya guided Bay FC to a 7th-place finish out of 14 teams. This put them into the NWSL playoffs, where they lost in the first round to the Washington Spirit.

On September 8, 2025, Bay FC announced that Montoya would leave at the end of the 2025 season after two seasons as head coach.

== Personal life ==
Montoya is married to Erin Montoya, a former player in the Women's United Soccer Association and alumna of Santa Clara University. They have two children, Allie and Mikey. Allie currently plays for Stanford Cardinal women's soccer.
