= 2024 Houston Dash season =

Houston Dash
2024 season
- Majority owner: Ted Segal
- President: Jessica O'Neill
- Head coach: Fran Alonso
- Stadium: Shell Energy Stadium, Houston
- NWSL: 14th
- 2024 NWSL Playoffs: DNQ
- 2024 Copa Tejas Shield: 6th
- Summer Cup: Group stage
- Top goalscorer: League: Diana Ordóñez (5); All: Diana Ordóñez (5)
- Highest home attendance: 8,600
- Lowest home attendance: 4,438
- Average home league attendance: 6,329
- Biggest win: HOU 3–0 NCC (5/24) (NWSL)
- Biggest defeat: NC 5–1 HOU (3/16) (NWSL)
Home colors	Away colors
- All statistics correct as of 15:49, November 3, 2024 (UTC).

The 2024 Houston Dash season was the team's eleventh season as an American professional women's soccer team in the National Women's Soccer League.

== Season ==
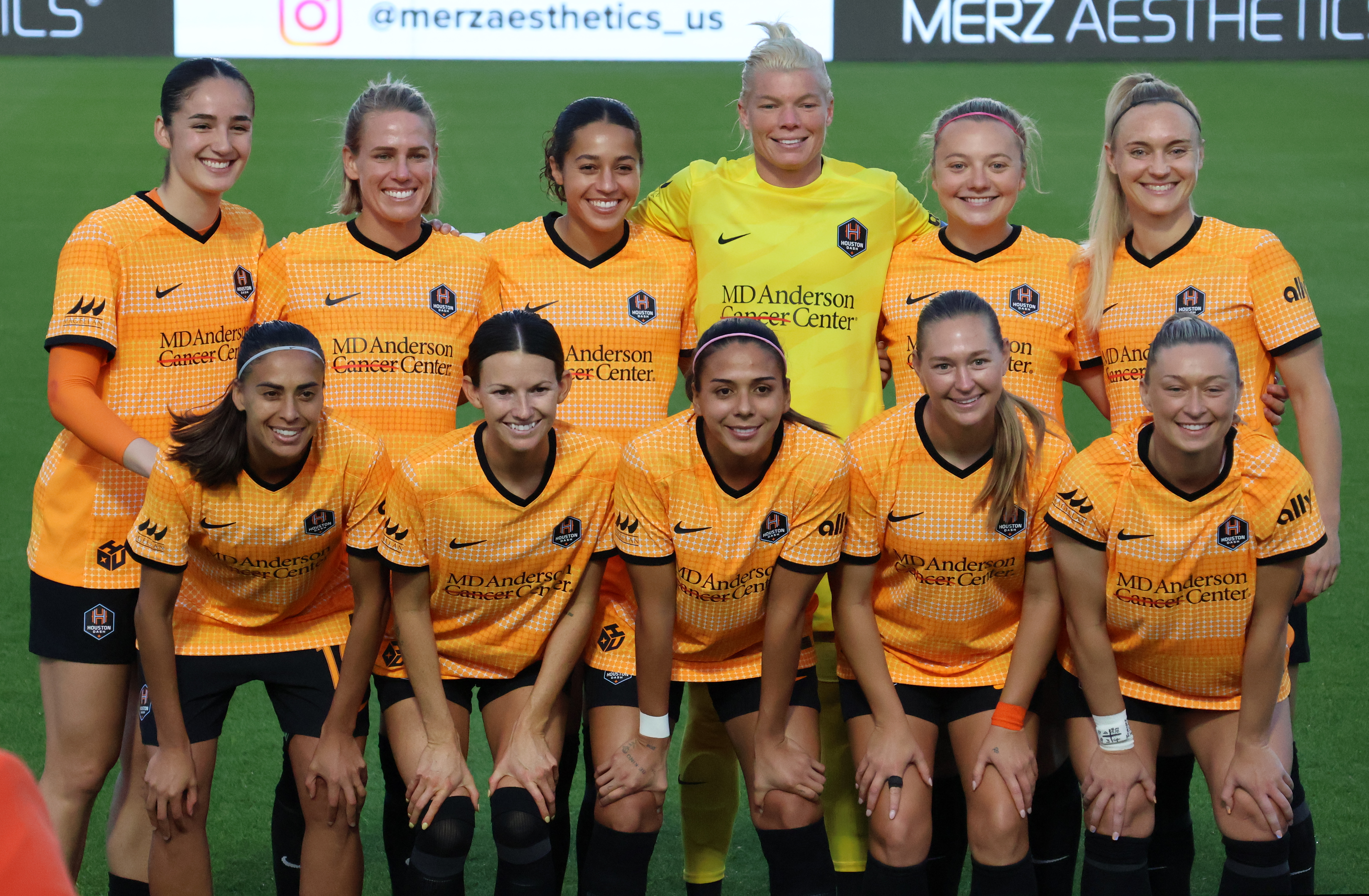
Starting lineup for the season opener Back: Ordóñez, Schmidt, Harris, Campbell, Patterson, Puntigam Front: Andressa, Kizer, Sánchez, Briede, Petersen

=== Pre-season ===
Immediately following the 2023 Houston Dash season, Houston Dash started their preparation for the 2024 NWSL Season. On November 20, 2023, the Dash announced their roster decisions headed into the 2024 season. Houston exercised contract options on Emily Alvarado, Madelyn Desiano, Jyllissa Harris, Sophie Hirst, Savannah Madden, Bárbara Olivieri, Sarah Puntigam, Cameron Tucker and Paulina Gramaglia, who will stay on loan for the 2024 season. The club will also exercise the option for Allysha Chapman, who is on maternity leave at the time of the announcement. Lindsi Jennings' option was not picked up. Joelle Anderson is out of contract. New contracts were not offered to Ella Dederick, Makamae Gomera-Stevens, and Devon Kerr and they leave the club as restricted free-agents. Caprice Dydasco, Shea Groom, Emily Curran, María Sánchez, and Marisa Viggiano are also released as free agents. On December 12, 2023, the Dash traded Joelle Anderson to Bay FC for $25,000 and protection in the 2024 NWSL Expansion Draft. The Dash also traded Cameron Tucker to Utah Royals FC for $50,000 and protection in the 2024 NWSL Expansion Draft. On December 18, 2023, the Dash traded $50,000 to the Utah Royals FC for Sierra Enge, before trading her to San Diego Wave FC in exchange for Belle Briede, the natural third round draft pick in the 2024 NWSL Draft, and $60,000. The following day, the Dash continued their offseason moves by resigning María Sánchez to a three-year contract with an option for a fourth for a record breaking 1.5 million dollars.

On January 12, 2023, the Dash announced the signing of free agent Yūki Nagasato, a veteran forward who spent the last season with the Chicago Red Stars. Later that day, the Dash drafted five players in the 2024 NWSL Draft. In the second round the team drafted forward Avery Patterson from North Carolina and midfielder Kiki Van Zanten from Notre Dame. In the third round the team drafted forward Amanda West from Pittsburgh and goalkeeper Heather Hinz from South Carolina. In the fourth round the team drafted defender Alyssa Bourgeois from Santa Clara. On January 17, 2024, Houston Dash announced they had made a trade to acquire forward Cece Kizer from the Kansas City Current in addition to a 2024 international roster spot in exchange for Nichelle Prince. On February 23, 2024, the Dash announced they had agreed to a contract extension through the 2025 season. On February 27, 2024, the Dash announced they had added three Under-18 signings. Goalkeeper Olivia Geller, a high school senior signed with Texas Christian University and forwards Ayva Jordan, a U.S. Youth international, and Zoe Miles, a Houston native. In addition, the team signed goalkeeper Alia Skinner, who spent last season with Virginia Tech. Along with the signings, the Dash came to terms with Ally Prisock to terminate her final year with the team. On March 13, Houston announced the signing Swedish international Elin Rubensson from BK Häcken.

=== March/April ===
Houston started the season on the road suffering a 5–1 loss to the North Carolina Courage. Houston's first home game of the season saw a record breaking crowd of 8,600 fans and ended in a 0–0 draw against Racing Louisville on the back of Jane Campbell's career high 10 saves. In their next game, the Dash picked up their first win af the season against Bay FC in a 3–2 road win against the expansion team. On April 3, Houston announced they had signed Swiss international forward Ramona Bachmann form Paris Saint–Germain for an undisclosed amount. On April 12, Houston fell 3–1 to the Washington Spirit after a pre-game celebration to commemorate their 10th anniversary. On the trade deadline day, Houton made multiple changes to their squad. In the biggest move, Houston traded María Sánchez to San Diego Wave FC for $300,000 in Intra-League fund, $200,000 in Allocation Money, and international slots for the 2024 and 2025 seasons. In addition to Sánchez, Houston traded Emily Alvarado to Portland Thorns FC for $35,000 in Allocation Money and a potential $50,000 more based on certain metrics achieved. Houston also added Paige Nielsen to their team, bringing veteran leadership to their back line. After the flurry of moves, Houston faced Portland Thorns, losing on the road 4–1. On April 23, the Dash signed another Defender, getting Tarciane from Corinthians. Houston ended the month of April with a 0–0 draw against Utah Royals.

=== May/June ===
The Dash started the month of May with a 1–1 draw against the Kansas City Current on a goal by Amanda West, after a 4-hour weather delay. In a midweek game on 8 May, Houston dropped three points to NJ/NY Gotham FC on a 8th minute goal by Lynn Williams. On May 12, Houston went on the road to California to capture a 1–0 win against Angel City FC on a goal by the Angel City player Paige Nielsen. In a shortened turn around, Houston returned home to play the Portland Thorns FC on May 17, losing 2–0. In their sixth home match of the season, Houston earned their first home win, in a impressive 3–0 over North Carolina Courage. Coming out of the international break, Houston faced RAcing Louisville, falling 2–0 on the road. Houston returned home to face Angel City and earned a 0–0 draw in a hard fought game, that ended with Jane Campbell making a double save on the goal line that concern about lack of goal line technology in the NWSL. On 20 June, Houston announced Jane Campbell (soccer) had signed a contract extension through the 2027 season, with an option for the 2028 season. Earning their sixth clean sheet of the season, Houston played San Diego Wave to a 0–0 draw. Houston closed out the month by losing 2–0 on the road to the Kansas City Current.

=== July/August ===
Houston started the month of July by closing out a two-game road trip with a loss to the Red Stars 1–0. Returning to NWSL play, Houston hosted the Orlando Pride, who come in on a 17-game unbeaten streak. Houston failed to end that streak, falling 0–1 against the Pride. Houston closed out the month of August, falling 1–3 to the Utah Royals, and dropping to the bottom of the table.

==== Summer Cup ====
Houston started the 2024 NWSL x Liga MX Femenil Summer Cup with a road loss against Kansas City Currant, 3–1. Returning home to play two games against Mexican sides, Houston captured a 2–1 win over Tigres UANL on goals from Sarah Puntigam and Babera Olivieri. Securing their second win of the Summer Cup, Houston earned a 2–0 win against C.F. Pachuca on goals from Andressa and Diana Ordóñez.

=== September/October ===
Houston fell 2–1 o NJ/NY Gotham on he road, giving up a late goal. Diana Ordóñez scoring Houston's only goal in he 17th minute. In their next game, Houston lost 3–0 in a dominating performance by the Washington Spirit. Houston earned a 1–0 victory a home against he Seattle Reign on a 50th minute goal by Yuki Nagasato. Houston went on the road to Orlando falling 3–1 to the Pride. The loan goal for Houston was scored by Nagasato. On October 1, 2024, Houston announced that they had reached an agreement with head coach Fran Alonso to part ways. The team also announced that Rickey Clarke would serve as interim coach as the new General Manager works to hire a new coach. Facing Chicago at home, Houston fell 0–2, officially becoming eliminated from post season changes. Houston went on the road and earned a 2–0 win against San Diego Wave. Houston split the series on the road with a 2–1 loss to the Seattle Reign. Houston fell 2–3 to playoff bound Bay FC in the final game of the season. Houston had goals by Olivieri and Patterson, but Bay FC put three in the back of the net on a brace by Racheal Kundananji.

== Roster ==
As of October 4, 2024.

No.	Name	Nationality	Position(s)	Date of birth (age)	Signed in	Previous club	Apps	Goals
Goalkeepers
1	Jane Campbell	(United States)	GK	February 17, 1995 (age 31)	2017	(United States) Stanford Cardinal	25	0
18	Heather Hinz	(United States)	GK	July 27, 2001 (age 24)	2024	(United States) Virginia Tech Hokies	4	0
23	Savannah Madden	(United States)	GK	February 2, 1999 (age 27)	2023	(United States) Texas Longhorns	0	0
40	Erin McKinney	(United States)	GK		2024	(United States) Wisconsin	1	0
99	Emily Alvarado	(Mexico)	GK	June 9, 1998 (age 28)	2023	(France) Stade de Reims Féminines	0	0
	Olivia Geller (Note: Under-18 Entry Mechanism)	(United States)	GK	January 4, 2007 (age 19)	2024	(United States) Southlake Carroll High School	0	0
	Alia Skinner	(United States)	GK	April 2, 2002 (age 24)	2024	(United States) Virginia Tech Hokies	0	0
Defenders
2	Allysha Chapman	(Canada)	DF	January 25, 1989 (age 37)	2018	(United States) North Carolina Courage	10	0
3	Tarciane	(Brazil)	DF	May 27, 2003 (age 23)	2024	(Brazil) Corinthians	12	0
4	Natalie Jacobs	(United States)	DF	August 16, 1997 (age 28)	2022	(Spain) Real Betis Féminas	19	1
7	Paige Nielsen	(United States)	DF	October 14, 1993 (age 32)	2024	(United States) Angel City FC	23	1
22	Croix Soto	(United States)	DF	January 2, 2001 (age 25)	2024	(United States) Kansas City Current	3	0
25	Katie Lind	(United States)	DF	February 15, 1994 (age 32)	2020	(Australia) Perth Glory	0	0
33	Jyllissa Harris	(United States)	DF	April 8, 2000 (age 26)	2023	(United States) South Carolina Gamecocks	14	0
50	Gabriela Guillén	(Costa Rica)	DF	March 1, 1992 (age 34)	2024	(United States) Dallas Trinity FC	0	0
	Madelyn Desiano	(United States)	DF	February 18, 2000 (age 26)	2023	(United States) UCLA Bruins	0	0
	Courtney Petersen	(United States)	DF	October 28, 1997 (age 28)	2023	(Spain) Orlando Pride	18	0
Midfielders
6	Havana Solaun	(Jamaica)	MF	February 23, 1993 (age 33)	2023	(United States) North Carolina Courage	6	1
10	Andressa	(Brazil)	MF	November 10, 1992 (age 33)	2023	(Italy) Roma	25	2
12	Kiki Van Zanten	(Jamaica)	MF	August 25, 2001 (age 24)	2024	(United States) Notre Dame Fighting Irish	4	0
13	Sophie Schmidt	(Canada)	MF	June 28, 1998 (age 28)	2019	(Germany) FFC Frankfurt	26	0
15	Bárbara Olivieri	(Venezuela)	MF	February 24, 2002 (age 24)	2023	(Mexico) Monterrey	26	5
17	Sarah Puntigam	(Austria)	MF	October 13, 1992 (age 33)	2023	(Germany) FC Köln	23	0
19	Belle Briede	(United States)	MF	October 3, 1998 (age 27)	2024	(United States) San Diego Wave FC	19	0
20	Sophie Hirst	(United States)	MF	February 25, 2000 (age 26)	2023	(United States) Harvard Crimson	9	0
26	Madison Ayson	(United States)	MF		2024	(United States) Xavier	3	0
31	Elin Rubensson	(Sweden)	MF	May 11, 1993 (age 33)	2024	(Sweden) BK Häcken	15	0
51	Gracie Brian	(United States)	MF	August 28, 2001 (age 24)	2024	(United States) Dallas Trinity FC	0	0
Forwards
5	Cece Kizer	(United States)	FW	August 7, 1997 (age 28)	2024	(United States) Kansas City Current	7	0
9	Diana Ordóñez	(Mexico)	FW	September 26, 2001 (age 24)	2023	(United States) North Carolina Courage	26	7
11	Michelle Alozie	(Nigeria)	FW	April 28, 1997 (age 29)	2021	(United States) Tennessee Volunteers	24	0
14	Yūki Nagasato	(Japan)	FW	July 15, 1987 (age 39)	2024	(United States) Chicago Red Stars	26	3
16	Amanda West	(Canada)	FW	February 11, 2001 (age 25)	2024	(United States) Pittsburgh Panthers	18	1
21	Ryan Gareis	(United States)	FW	November 13, 1998 (age 27)	2022	(United States) South Carolina Gamecocks	7	0
27	Zoe Matthews	(Jamaica)	FW	May 25, 2007 (age 19)	2024	(United States) Solar SC	2	0
28	Ramona Bachmann	(Switzerland)	FW	December 25, 1990 (age 35)	2024	(France) Paris Saint-Germain F.C. (women)	12	2
29	Madison Wolfbauer	(United States)	FW	August 1, 1999 (age 26)	2024	(Iceland) Keflavík ÍF	1	0
30	Avery Patterson	(United States)	FW	June 14, 2002 (age 24)	2024	(United States) North Carolina Tar Heels	29	1
	María Sánchez	(Mexico)	FW	February 20, 1996 (age 30)	2021	(Mexico) UANL	4	0
	Ayva Jordan	(United States)	FW	October 24, 2007 (age 18)	2024	(United States) Slammers FC HB Koge (ECNL)	0	0

== Transactions ==
=== 2024 NWSL Draft ===
Draft picks are not automatically signed to the team roster. The 2024 NWSL Draft will be held on January 12, 2024.

Round	Pick	Nat.	Player	Pos.	College	Status	Ref.
1	5 (Note: Houston Dash → North Carolina Courage. North Carolina Courage acquired the No. 8 pick in the 2023 NWSL Draft, the natural first-round pick in the 2024 NWSL Draft, a 2023 international spot, and $100,000 in allocation money from Houston Dash in exchange for Diana Ordóñez and the No. 30 pick in the 2023 NWSL Draft.)		N/A				
2	5 (19)	(United States)	Avery Patterson	FW	North Carolina	Signed three-year deal through 2026	
2	7 (21) (Note: Washington Spirit → Utah Royals FC → Houston Dash. Houston Dash acquired the No. 21 pick from Utah Royals FC for $120,000. Utah Royals FC has previously received the Washington Spirit's natural second round pick for protection in the 2024 expansion draft protection.)	(Jamaica)	Kiki Van Zanten	MF	Notre Dame		
3	5 (33) (Note: Houston Dash → Portland Thorns FC. Portland Thorns FC acquired the natural third-round pick in the 2024 NWSL Draft and $10,000 in allocation money from Houston Dash in exchange for the No. 48 pick in the 2024 NWSL Draft.)		N/A				
3	8 (36) (Note: Orlando Pride → Houston Dash. Houston Dash acquired Courtney Petersen and the natural third-round pick in the 2024 NWSL Draft from Orlando Pride in exchange for $65,000 allocation money.)	(Canada)	Amanda West	FW	Pittsburgh	Signed one-year agreement with one year option	
3	10 (38) (Note: North Carolina Courage → Houston Dash. Houston Dash acquired the No.38 pick in the 2024 NWSL Draft, from North Carolina Courage in exchange for the No. 40 pick in the 2024 NWSL Draft and $10,000 in allocation money.)	(United States)	Heather Hinz	GK	South Carolina		
3	12 (40) (Note: San Diego Wave FC → Houston Dash → North Carolina Courage. North Carolina Courage acquired the No. 40 pick and $10,000 from Houston Dash in exchange for the No 38 pick. Previously, Houston Dash acquired Belle Briede, the natural third-round pick in the 2024 NWSL Draft, and $60,000 allocation money from San Diego Wave FC in exchange for Sierra Enge.)		N/A				
4	5 (47)	(United States)	Alyssa Bourgeois	DF	Santa Clara		

=== Transfers in ===
Date	Nat.	Player	Pos.	Previous club	Fee/notes	Ref.
December 17, 2023	(United States)	Sierra Enge	MF	(United States) Bay FC	$50,000	
December 17, 2023	(United States)	Belle Briede	MF	(United States) San Diego Wave FC	Traded with San Diego Wave FC for Sierra Enge	
December 18, 2023	(Mexico)	María Sánchez	FW	(United States) Houston Dash	Free agent	
January 12, 2024	(Japan)	Yūki Nagasato	FW	(United States) Chicago Red Stars	Free agent	
January 17, 2024	(United States)	Cece Kizer	FW	(United States) Kansas City Current	Trade for Nichelle Prince	
February 27, 2024	(United States)	Olivia Geller	GK	(United States) Southlake Carroll High School	Under-18 Entry Mechanism	
February 27, 2024	(United States)	Ayva Jordan	FW	(United States) Slammers FC HB Koge (ECNL)	Under-18 Entry Mechanism	
February 27, 2024	(United States)	Zoe Miles	FW	(United States) Solar SC	Under-18 Entry Mechanism	
February 27, 2024	(United States)	Alia Skinner	GK	(United States) Virginia Tech		
March 13, 2024	(Sweden)	Elin Rubensson	MF	(Sweden) BK Häcken		
March 13, 2024	(United States)	Croix Soto	DF	(United States) Kansas City Current		
April 2, 2024	(Switzerland)	Ramona Bachmann	FW	(France) Paris Saint-Germain	Undisclosed	
April 20, 2024	(United States)	Paige Nielsen	DF	(United States) Angel City FC	$50,000 in Allocation Money $50,000 in Intra-League Transfer Funds	
April 23, 2024	(Brazil)	Tarciane	DF	(Brazil) Corinthians	Undisclosed	
June 6, 2024	(United States)	Erin McKinney	GK	(United States) Wisconsin	Undisclosed	
July 19, 2024	(United States)	Madison Wolfbauer	FW	(Iceland) Keflavík ÍF	National Team Replacement Contract	

=== Loan in ===
No.	Pos.	Player	Loaned from	Start	End	Source
50	DF	(Costa Rica) Gabriela Guillén	(United States) Dallas Trinity FC	September 21, 2024		
51	MF	(United States) Gracie Brian	(United States) Dallas Trinity FC	September 21, 2024		

=== Transfers out ===
Date	Nat.	Player	Pos.	Destination club	Fee/notes	Ref.
November 20, 2023	(United States)	Lindsi Jennings	DF		Option not exercised	
November 20, 2023	(United States)	Ella Dederick	GK		Not offered contracts - Restricted Free Agent	
November 20, 2023	(United States)	Makamae Gomera-Stevens	MF		Not offered contracts - Restricted Free Agent	
November 20, 2023	(Canada)	Devon Kerr	DF		Not offered contracts - Restricted Free Agent	
November 20, 2023	(United States)	Caprice Dydasco	DF	(United States) Bay FC	Free Agent	
November 20, 2023	(United States)	Shea Groom	MF	(United States) Chicago Red Stars	Free Agent	
November 20, 2023	(United States)	Emily Curran	MF		Free Agent	
November 20, 2023	(Mexico)	María Sánchez	FW	(United States) Houston Dash	Free Agent	
November 20, 2023	(United States)	Marisa Viggiano	MF	(United States) Racing Louisville FC	Free Agent	
December 12, 2023	(United States)	Joelle Anderson	FW	(United States) Bay FC	$25,000	
December 12, 2023	(United States)	Cameron Tucker	FW	(United States) Utah Royals FC	$50,000	
December 17, 2023	(United States)	Sierra Enge	MF	(United States) San Diego Wave FC	$60,000 and Third round draft pick and Belle Briede	
January 17, 2024	(Canada)	Nichelle Prince	FW	(United States) Kansas City Current	Trade for Cece Kizer	
February 27, 2024	(United States)	Ally Prisock	DF		Agreed to mutually terminate contract	
April 20, 2024	(Mexico)	María Sánchez	FW	(United States) San Diego Wave FC	$300,000 in Intra-League Transfer Fund $200,000 in Allocation Money; 2024 and 2025 international slots	
April 20, 2024	(Mexico)	Emily Alvarado	GK	(United States) Portland Thorns FC	$35,000 in Allocation Money $50,000 in money if metrics met	
August 30, 2024	(United States)	Courtney Petersen	DF	(United States) Racing Louisville FC	$45,000 in Allocation Money	

=== Loan out ===
No.	Pos.	Player	Loaned to	Start	End	Source
	FW	(Argentina) Paulina Gramaglia	(Brazil) Red Bull Bragantino	January 1, 2024	December 31, 2024	
18	GK	(United States) Heather Hinz	(United States) Fort Lauderdale United FC	November 9, 2024	February 16, 2025	

=== New contracts ===
Date	Pos.	No.	Player	Contract until	Ref.
December 18, 2023	FW	7	(Mexico) María Sánchez	2026 + 1yr option	
February 24, 2024	FW	5	(United States) Cece Kizer	2025	
June 20, 2024	GK	1	(United States) Jane Campbell	2027 + 1yr option	
August 27, 2024	DF	7	(United States) Paige Nielsen	2028	

== Staff ==
As of 1 October 2023

Role	Name
President	(United States) Jessica O'Neill
General manager	Vacant
Head coach	(United States) Ricky Clarke (interim)
Goalkeeping coach	(United States) Eric Klenofsky
Assistant coach Video analyst	(United States) Hiro Suzuki
Technical Director	(Sweden) Pablo Piñones Arce
Equipment manager	(United States) Paloma Paez

== Non-competitive fixtures ==
=== Preseason ===
February 16	Houston Dash	0–2	Costa Rica	Houston, Texas
		Report

== Competitive fixtures ==
=== 2024 National Women's Soccer League season ===
==== Regular-season standings ====
Pos	Team	Pld	W	D	L	GF	GA	GD	Pts
10	San Diego Wave FC	26	6	7	13	24	35	−11	25
11	Utah Royals	26	7	4	15	22	40	−18	25
12	Angel City FC	26	7	6	13	29	42	−13	24 (Note: Angel City FC were deducted three points for breaching spending cap rules.)
13	Seattle Reign FC	26	6	5	15	27	44	−17	23
14	Houston Dash	26	5	5	16	20	42	−22	20

Source: NWSL
Rules for classification: Tiebreakers

===== Results summary =====
Overall								Home						Away					
Pld	W	D	L	GF	GA	GD	Pts	W	D	L	GF	GA	GD	W	D	L	GF	GA	GD
26	4	5	17	20	45	−25	17	1	4	6	7	12	−5	3	1	11	13	33	−20

Last updated: November 2, 2024.
Source: NWSLsoccer.com

Matchday	1	2	3	4	5	6	7	8	9	10	11	12	13	14	15	16	17	18	19	20	21	22	23	24	25	26
Stadium	A	H	A	H	A	A	H	H	A	H	H	A	H	H	A	A	A	H	A	A	H	A	H	A	A	H
Result	L	D	W	L	L	D	D	L	W	L	W	L	D	D	L	L	L	L	L	L	W	L	L	W	L	L
Position	14	11	4	9	12	11	13	13	10	11	9	10	10	12	12	12	12	14	14	14	13	14	14	14	14	14

Updated to match(es) played on November 2, 2024. Source: NWSL
A = Away; H = Home; W = Win; D = Draw; L = Loss

==== Legend ====
Win	Draw	Loss	Postponed

=== League ===
Matchday	Date	Opponent	Venue	Location	Result (Note: Houston Dash score written first)	Scorers	Attendance	Referee	Position
1	March 16	North Carolina Courage	WakeMed Soccer Park	Cary, North Carolina	1–5		5,878	Anya Voigt	14th
2	March 23	Racing Louisville	Shell Energy Stadium	Houston, Texas	0–0		8,600	Brandon Stevis	11th
3	March 30	Bay FC	PayPal Park	San Jose, California	3–2	Ordóñez 66', 87'; Solaun 90+10	18,000	Abdou Ndiaya	4th
4	April 12	Washington Spirit	Shell Energy Stadium	Houston, Texas	1–3	Jacobs 1'	7,767	Filip Dunic	9th
5	April 20	Portland Thorns	Providence Park	Portland, Oregon	1–4	Ordóñez 49'	17,580	Danielle Chesky	12th
6	April 27	Utah Royals	America First Field	Sandy, Utah	0–0		10,349	Shawn Tehini	11th
7	May 5	Kansas City Current	Shell Energy Stadium	Houston, Texas	1–1	West 71'	5,099	Calin Radosav	13th
8	May 8	NJ/NY Gotham FC	Shell Energy Stadium	Houston, Texas	0–1		4,438	Laura Rodriguez	13th
9	May 12	Angel City FC	BMO Stadium	Los Angeles, California	1-0	Nielsen 90+8'	18,037	Thomas Snyder	10th
10	May 17	Portland Thorns	Shell Energy Stadium	Houston, Texas	0-2		5,726	Rebecca Pagan	11th
11	May 24	North Carolina Courage	Shell Energy Stadium	Houston, Texas	3–0	Bachmann 44'; Olivieri 68'; Ordóñez 78'	4,732	Matthew Corrigan	9th
12	June 7	Racing Louisville FC	Lynn Family Stadium	Louisville, Kentucky	0–2		6,061	Ekaterina Koroleva	10th
13	June 15	Angel City FC	Shell Energy Stadium	Houston, Texas	0–0		6,147	Eric Tattersall	10th
14	June 22	San Diego Wave FC	Shell Energy Stadium	Houston, Texas	0–0		6,437	JC Griggs	12th
15	June 28	Kansas City Current	CPKC Stadium	Kansas City, Missouri	0–2		11,500	Greg Dopka	12th
16	July 6	Chicago Red Stars	SeatGeek Stadium	Bridgeview, Illinois	0–1		5,566	Abdou Ndiaye	12th
17	August 23	Orlando Pride	Shell Energy Stadium	Houston, Texas	0–1		6,514	Alex Billeter	12th
18	August 31	Utah Royals	Shell Energy Stadium	Houston, Texas	1–3	Andressa 73'	5,171	Gerald Flores	14th
19	September 8	NJ/NY Gotham FC	Red Bull Arena	Harrison, New Jersey	1-2	Ordóñez 17'	5,883	Joshua Encarnación	14th
20	September 15	Washington Spirit	Audi Field	Washington D.C.	0–3		11,792	Matthew Corrigan	14th
21	September 21	Seattle Reign FC	Shell Energy Stadium	Houston, Texas	1–0	Nagasato 50'	5,807	Jamie Padilla	13th
22	September 28	Orlando Pride	Inter&Co Stadium	Orlando, Florida	1–3	Nagasato 53'	17,087	Iryna Petrunok	14th
23	October 4	Chicago Red Stars	Shell Energy Stadium	Houston, Texas	0–2		5,870	Katja Koroleva	14th
24	October 13	San Diego Wave FC	Snapdragon Stadium	San Diego, California	2–0	Olivieri 30'; Bachmann 72'		Jaclyn Metz	14th
25	October 18	Seattle Reign FC	Lumen Field	Seattle, Washington	1–2	Olivieri 25' (p)		Brad Jensen	14th
26	November 2	Bay FC	Shell Energy Stadium	Houston, Texas	2–3	Olivieri 14', Patterson 46'	8,176	Matthew Thompson	14th

=== NWSL x Liga MX Femenil Summer Cup ===
Pos	Team	Pld	W	PW	PL	L	GF	GA	GD	Pts	Qualification	KC	HOU	TIG	PAC
1	(United States Soccer Federation) Kansas City Current	3	3	0	0	0	10	2	+8	9	Advances to knockout stage	—	3–1	4–1	3–0
2	(United States Soccer Federation) Houston Dash	3	2	0	0	1	5	4	+1	6		1–3	—	2–1	2–0
3	(Mexican Football Federation) Tigres UANL	3	1	0	0	2	6	8	−2	3		1–4	1–2	—	4–2
4	(Mexican Football Federation) Pachuca	3	0	0	0	3	2	9	−7	0		0–3	0–2	2–4	—

Source: NWSL
Rules for classification: tiebreakers

Matchday	Date	Opponent	Venue	Location	Result (Note: Houston Dash score written first)	Scorers	Attendance	Referee
1	July 20	(United States) Kansas City Current	CPKC Stadium	Kansas City, Missouri	1–3	Nagasato 20'		Corbyn May
2	July 27	(Mexico) Tigres UANL	Shell Energy Stadium	Houston, Texas	2–1			
3	August 1	(Mexico) C.F. Pachuca	Shell Energy Stadium	Houston, Texas	2–0			

== Awards and honors ==
=== Save of the week ===
Week	Player	Ref.
2	(Austria) Sarah Puntigam	

=== Goal of the week ===
Week	Player	Ref.
20	(Japan) Yūki Nagasato	

=== End-of-season awards ===
Award	Winner	Ref
Most Valuable Player	(United States) Jane Campbell	
Players’ Player of the Year	(United States) Jane Campbell	
Golden Boot	(Mexico) Diana Ordóñez	
Defender of the Year	(United States) Paige Nielsen	
Newcomer of the Year	(United States) Avery Patterson	
Young Player of the Year	(Venezuela) Bárbara Olivieri	

== See also ==
- 2024 National Women's Soccer League season
- 2024 in American soccer
