= 2023 Houston Dash season =

Houston Dash
2023 season
- Majority owner: Ted Segal
- President: Jessica O'Neill
- Head coach: Sam Laity (until Sep 6); Sarah Lowdon (interim since Sep 6)
- Stadium: Shell Energy Stadium, Houston
- NWSL: 10th
- 2023 NWSL Playoffs: DNQ
- 2023 Shield: 10th
- 2023 NWSL Challenge Cup: Central Division: 3rd
- 2023 Copa Tejas Shield: 6th
- Top goalscorer: María Sánchez (4) & Michelle Alozie (4)
- Highest home attendance: 9,175
- Lowest home attendance: 4,124
- Average home league attendance: 5,910
- Biggest win: HOU 2–0 ORL (6/3) (NWSL); HOU 2–0 CHI (5/3) (Cup)
- Biggest defeat: HOU 0–3 SD (5/20) (NWSL); RAC 3–0 HOU (6/13) (Cup)
| Home colors | Away colors |
- All statistics correct as of 15:03, October 16, 2023 (UTC).

The 2023 Houston Dash season was the team's tenth season as an American professional women's soccer team in the National Women's Soccer League.

== Season ==
=== Pre-season ===
Immediately following the 2022 Houston Dash season, Houston Dash started their preparation for the 2023 NWSL Season. On November 15, 2022, the team announced that it was 14 players as worked to build their 2023 roster. The declined Valérie Gauvin's option, released Elizabeth Eddy, Cali Farquharson to free agency, and Michelle Alozie, Michaela Abam, Makamae Gomera-Stevens, Kelcie Hedge, Emily Ogle, Ally Prisock, Annika Schmidt, Natalie Jacobs, Lindsey Harris, Tiernny Wiltshire, and Brianna Visalli were all out of contract. On the same day the team announced it was purchasing Paulina Gramaglia option, after her loan. On December 8, 2022, the Dash announced that they had resigned Michelle Alozie to a new contract, adding depth to attack. December 14, 2022, the team continued to build its attacking capabilities by signing Natalie Jacobs to a new contract. Houston started working on rebuilding their defensive presence on December 19, 2022, by resigning Ally Prisock to the team. On December 21, 2022, the Houston Dash announced they had chosen the fourth coach in team history, hiring Sam Laity after his term as interim coach with the OL Reign. Houston continued to work on their defensive depth for 2023 by re-signing Annika Creel (formerly Schmidt) on January 5, 2023. Continuing to shape their 2023 roster, Houston signed Devon Kerr on January 6, 2023. Kerr is a Goalkeeper who started with the Dash in their 2019 season, and has spent the last three seasons with the Washington Spirit. Houston continued to re-sign players on January 9, 2023, when they added Emily Curran (formerly Ogle) to the midfield. On January 11, 2023, the Dash announced the signing of Jamaican international midfielder Havana Solaun. Just prior to the 2023 NWSL draft, Houston announced they had traded for Diana Ordóñez and the 2023 NWSL draft 30th pick from the North Carolina Courage for their 2023 and 2024 first round pick, 2023 international slot and $100,000 in allocation money. On February 1, 2023, the Dash announced they had acquired the rights for Courtney Petersen from the Orlando Pride in addition to the Pride's natural third round pick in the 2024 NWSL draft.

=== Challenge Cup ===
The 2023 version of the NWSL Challenge Cup will be held interspersed throughout the season, rather than being before the start of the season. The first Challenge Cup round for Houston was held on April 19, 2023, a midweek match against the Kansas City Current, which ended in a 2–0 defeat. Houston topped the Chicago Red Stars 2–0 in the second round of the Challenge Cup, with goals from Bárbara Olivieri and Diana Ordóñez. In their third round of the Challenge Cup, the Dash went on the road and lost 3–0 to Racing Louisville FC.

=== March/April ===
Starting their season at home, the Houston Dash earned a draw against Racing Louisville FC in the first game of the season. In their second game of the season, the Dash picked up the first win of the season, winning 2–1 against the Chicago Red Stars. The Dash managed to stay undefeated through the third game of the season by earning a draw against the league leading Portland Thorns FC. María Sánchez earned a first half equalizer, allowing the Dash to fight for a point in the game. April ended in the worst way possible, with a 1–0 loss to the North Carolina Courage due to a, weather induced, game abandonment in the 52nd minute of play.

=== May/June ===
The Dash started May off on the road at OL Reign, losing their second game of the season 2–0 to the league leaders. Houston bounced back in their second NWSL match of the month defeating the Portland Thorns FC 2–1 at home on goals from Ebony Salmon and Joelle Anderson. On May 20, 2023, Houston suffered their worse loss of the season to date by falling to San Diego Wave FC 3–0. In their next match, the Dash went on the road and secured a 2–0 win against the Kansas City Current and Jane Campbell (soccer) went over the 10,000 minute mark in the NWSL. As June started Houston kept up their winning ways by defeating the Orlando Pride 2–0 at home, with Hirst and Alozie both scoring their first goals of the season. On June 11 Houston drew with NJ/NY Gotham FC 1–1 at home, earning a point, but falling to 7th half way through the season.

=== July/August ===
To start the month of July, the Dash faced North Carolina Courage earning loss on the road 1–0 in North Carolina, after weather delayed start. On July 7, 2023, the Dash returned home to face the Chicago Red Stars, again suffering a 1–0 loss and extending their winless streak to five games. The Dash had 7 players selected to their national teams for the 2023 FIFA Women's World Cup that started on July 20, 2023, and goes until August 20, 2023. After a two-week break, Houston returned to the 2023 NWSL Challenge Cup against Kansas City Current, losing 3–1 and extending their losing streak to three games and winless streak to six games in all competitions. On July 26, 2023, Houston signed Sarah Puntigam to the squad for the rest of the 2023 season. The Dash managed a 1–0 win against Racing Louisville FC in the 2023 NWSL Challenge Cup on a goal by Ebony Salmon. The Dash closed out their Challenge Cup competition with a 3–0 loss to the Chicago Red Stars. In their first game back for the international break, Houston grabbed a late point on a stoppage time goal by Sanchez, drawing with the Washington Spirit 1–1. On August 26, the Dash earned another point at home against Chicago Red Star on a 1–1 draw on a goal from Michelle Alozie.

=== September ===
The Dash started September by falling to the San Diego Wave 1–0 after falling to 10 players on a Michelle Alozie was given a red card for DOGSO in the 33rd minute. On September 6, the Dash fired Laity. Two days later the team announced that Sarah Lowdon will serve as the interim head coach for the remainder of the 2023 season. On the same day the Dash announced they had completed the transfer of Ebony Salmon to Aston Villa W.F.C. for an undisclosed amount. Returning to play after the release of Laity, Houston secured three points beating Racing Louisville FC 1-0, keeping their slim chance at a play-off position alive. The Dash continued to push for a play-off spot by earning their eight clean sheet of the season in a 2–0 defeat of NJ/NY Gotham FC on two goals by Michelle Alozie. In front of the largest home crowd of the season Houston fell late to Angel City FC 2–1. The Dash finished the season with a 1–0 loss to the Orlando Pride, ending the season 6–8–8.

== Roster ==
As of October 15, 2023.

| No. | Name | Nationality | Position(s) | Date of birth (age) | Signed in | Previous club | Apps | Goals |
Goalkeepers
| 1 | Jane Campbell | (United States) | GK | February 17, 1995 (aged 28) | 2017 | (United States) Stanford Cardinal | 24 | 0 |
| 20 | Devon Kerr^{EA} | (Canada) | GK | July 3, 1997 (aged 26) | 2023 | (United States) Washington Spirit | 0 | 0 |
| 33 | Ella Dederick^{SEI} | (United States) | GK | July 27, 1996 (aged 27) | 2021 | (United States) OL Reign | 0 | 0 |
| 35 | Savannah Madden | (United States) | GK | February 2, 1999 (aged 24) | 2023 | (United States) Texas Longhorns | 0 | 0 |
| 99 | Emily Alvarado | (Mexico) | GK | June 9, 1998 (aged 25) | 2023 | (France) Stade de Reims Féminines | 2 | 0 |
Defenders
| 2 | Allysha Chapman | (Canada) | DF | January 25, 1989 (aged 34) | 2018 | (United States) North Carolina Courage | 13 | 0 |
| 3 | Caprice Dydasco | (United States) | DF | August 19, 1993 (aged 30) | 2022 | (United States) NJ/NY Gotham FC | 24 | 0 |
| 4 | Natalie Jacobs | (United States) | DF | August 16, 1997 (aged 26) | 2022 | (Spain) Real Betis Féminas | 21 | 0 |
| 5 | Courtney Petersen | (United States) | DF | October 28, 1997 (aged 25) | 2023 | (Spain) Orlando Pride | 16 | 0 |
| 23 | Ally Prisock | (United States) | DF | January 18, 1997 (aged 26) | 2021 | (United States) USC Trojans | 11 | 1 |
| 25 | Katie Lind | (United States) | DF | February 15, 1994 (aged 29) | 2020 | (Australia) Perth Glory | 19 | 0 |
| 31 | Madelyn Desiano | (United States) | DF | February 18, 2000 (aged 23) | 2023 | (United States) UCLA Bruins | 6 | 1 |
| 36 | Lindsi Jennings | (United States) | DF | age (23) | 2023 | (United States) LSU Tigers | 4 | 0 |
| 37 | Jyllissa Harris | (United States) | DF | April 8, 2000 (aged 23) | 2023 | (United States) South Carolina Gamecocks | 6 | 0 |
Midfielders
| 6 | Havana Solaun | (Jamaica) | MF | February 23, 1993 (aged 30) | 2023 | (United States) North Carolina Courage | 10 | 0 |
| 10 | Shea Groom^{SEI} | (United States) | MF | May 4, 1993 (aged 30) | 2020 | (United States) Reign FC | 1 | 0 |
| 13 | Sophie Schmidt | (Canada) | MF | June 28, 1998 (aged 25) | 2019 | (Germany) FFC Frankfurt | 20 | 0 |
| 14 | Marisa Viggiano | (United States) | MF | February 5, 1997 (aged 26) | 2022 | (United States) Orlando Pride | 22 | 0 |
| 15 | Bárbara Olivieri | (United States) | MF | February 24, 2002 (aged 21) | 2023 | (Mexico) Monterrey | 9 | 1 |
| 17 | Sarah Puntigam | (Austria) | MF | October 13, 1992 (aged 31) | 2023 | (Germany) FC Köln | 7 | 0 |
| 18 | Emily Curran^{SEI} | (United States) | MF | August 5, 1996 (aged 27) | 2021 | (United States) Portland Thorns FC | 0 | 0 |
| 26 | Makamae Gomera-Stevens^{SEI} | (United States) | MF | March 17, 1999 (aged 24) | 2021 | (United States) Washington State Cougars | 0 | 0 |
| 30 | Sophie Hirst | (United States) | MF | February 25, 2000 (aged 23) | 2023 | (United States) Harvard Crimson | 11 | 1 |
| 55 | Hope Breslin | (United States) | MF | March 10, 1999 (aged 24) | 2023 | (United States) Angel City FC | 1 | 0 |
| 77 | Andressa | (Brazil) | MF | November 10, 1992 (aged 30) | 2023 | (Italy) Roma | 5 | 1 |
| | Kelcie Hedge | (United States) | MF | September 19, 1997 (aged 26) | 2021 | (United States) OL Reign | 1 | 0 |
Forwards
| 7 | María Sánchez | (Mexico) | FW | February 20, 1996 (aged 27) | 2021 | (Mexico) UANL | 24 | 5 |
| 8 | Nichelle Prince | (Canada) | FW | February 15, 1995 (aged 28) | 2017 | (United States) Ohio State Buckeyes | 7 | 0 |
| 9 | Ebony Salmon | (England) | FW | January 27, 2001 (aged 22) | 2022 | (United States) Racing Louisville FC | 20 | 1 |
| 11 | Diana Ordóñez | (Mexico) | FW | September 26, 2001 (aged 22) | 2023 | (United States) North Carolina Courage | 23 | 3 |
| 21 | Ryan Gareis | (United States) | FW | November 13, 1998 (aged 24) | 2022 | (United States) South Carolina Gamecocks | 12 | 1 |
| 22 | Michelle Alozie | (Nigeria) | FW | April 28, 1997 (aged 26) | 2021 | (United States) Tennessee Volunteers | 18 | 4 |
| 29 | Joelle Anderson | (United States) | FW | October 6, 1998 (aged 25) | 2022 | (United States) Pepperdine Waves | 17 | 1 |
| 39 | Cameron Tucker | (United States) | FW | July 15, 1999 (aged 24) | 2023 | (United States) BYU Cougars | 15 | 0 |

- EA=Excused absence
- SEI=Season ending injury

== Transactions ==
=== 2023 NWSL Draft ===
Draft picks are not automatically signed to the team roster. The 2023 NWSL Draft was held on January 12, 2023.

| Round | Pick | Nat. | Player | Pos. | College | Status | Ref. |
|---|---|---|---|---|---|---|---|
| 2 | 8 (20) | (United States) | Sophie Hirst | MF | Harvard | Signed with team | |
| 2 | 10 (22) (Note: OL Reign → Orlando Pride → Houston Dash. Houston Dash acquired a second-round pick in the 2023 NWSL Draft and $75,000 in allocation money from Orlando Pride in exchange for Haley Hanson. Orlando Pride had previously acquired the natural second-round pick in the 2023 NWSL Draft, the No. 10 pick in the 2022 NWSL Draft, Celia, and Leah Pruitt from OL Reign in exchange for Phoebe McClernon.) | (United States) | Jyllissa Harris | DF | South Carolina | Signed with team | |
| 3 | 6 (30) (Note: Houston Dash → North Carolina Courage. North Carolina Courage acquired the No. 8 pick in the 2023 NWSL Draft, the natural first-round pick in the 2024 NWSL Draft, a 2023 international spot, and $100,000 in allocation money from Houston Dash in exchange for Diana Ordóñez and the No. 30 pick in the 2023 NWSL Draft.) | | N/A | | | | |
| 3 | 8 (32) (Note: OL Reign → Houston Dash. Washington Spirit acquired the No. 30 pick from the Houston Dash for $30,000 in allocation money and the No. 32 pick.) | | N/A | | | | |
| 3 | 12 (36) (Note: Portland Thorns FC → Houston Dash. Portland Thorns FC acquired the No. 32 pick from the Houston Dash for $20,000 in allocation money and the No. 36 pick.) | (United States) | Lindsi Jennings | DF | LSU | Signed with team | |
| 4 | 12 (48) (Note: Portland Thorns FC → Houston Dash . Houston Dash acquired the No. 48 pick in the 2023 NWSL Draft from Portland Thorns FC in exchange for the natural third-round pick of 2024 NWSL Draft and $10,000 in allocation money.) | (United States) | Madelyn Desiano | DF | UCLA | Signed with team | |

=== Transfers in ===
| Date | Nat. | Player | Pos. | Previous club | Fee/notes | Ref. |
|---|---|---|---|---|---|---|
| November 15, 2022 | (Argentina) | Paulina Gramaglia | FW | (Argentina) UAI Urquiza | Purchase Option from Loan | |
| December 8, 2022 | (Nigeria) | Michelle Alozie | FW | (United States) Houston Dash | Free Agent | |
| December 14, 2022 | (United States) | Natalie Jacobs | FW | (United States) Houston Dash | Free Agent | |
| December 19, 2022 | (United States) | Ally Prisock | DF | (United States) Houston Dash | Free Agent | |
| January 5, 2023 | (United States) | Annika Creel | DF | (United States) Houston Dash | Free Agent | |
| January 6, 2023 | (Canada) | Devon Kerr | GK | (United States) Washington Spirit | Free Agent | |
| January 9, 2023 | (United States) | Emily Curran | MF | (United States) Houston Dash | Free Agent | |
| January 11, 2023 | (Jamaica) | Havana Solaun | MF | (United States) North Carolina Courage | Free Agent | |
| January 12, 2023 | (Mexico) | Diana Ordóñez | FW | (United States) North Carolina Courage | 2023 & 2024 first round draft pick, 2023 International Slot, $100,000 allocation money | |
| February 1, 2023 | (United States) | Courtney Petersen | DF | (United States) Orlando Pride | $65,000 allocation money | |
| February 7, 2023 | (Venezuela) | Bárbara Olivieri | MF | (Mexico) Monterrey | Contract for 2023 season with an option for 2024 | |
| April 7, 2023 | (Mexico) | Emily Alvarado | GK | (France) Reims | Contract for 2023 season with an option for 2024 | |
| June 28, 2023 | (Brazil) | Andressa | MF | (Italy) Roma | Free agent signed through 2024 with an option for an additional year. | |
| July 21, 2023 | (United States) | Susanna Friedrichs | DF | (Iceland) UMF Selfoss | National Team Replacement Player | |
| July 26, 2023 | (Australia) | Sarah Puntigam | MF | (Germany) FC Köln | Free agent signed through 2023 with an option for an additional year. | |

=== Transfers out ===
| Date | Nat. | Player | Pos. | Destination club | Fee/notes | Ref. |
|---|---|---|---|---|---|---|
| November 15, 2022 | (France) | Valérie Gauvin | FW | FC Fleury 91 | Option Declined | |
| November 15, 2022 | (United States) | Elizabeth Eddy | MF | | Free Agent | |
| November 15, 2022 | (United States) | Cali Farquharson | MF | | Free Agent | |
| November 15, 2022 | (Nigeria) | Michelle Alozie | FW | Houston Dash | Out of Contract | |
| November 15, 2022 | (Cameroon) | Michaela Abam | FW | Linköping FC | Out of Contract | |
| November 15, 2022 | (United States) | Makamae Gomera-Stevens | MF | Houston Dash | Out of Contract | |
| November 15, 2022 | (United States) | Kelcie Hedge | MF | Houston Dash | Out of Contract | |
| November 15, 2022 | (United States) | Emily Ogle | MF | Houston Dash | Out of Contract | |
| November 15, 2022 | (United States) | Ally Prisock | DF | Houston Dash | Out of Contract | |
| November 15, 2022 | (United States) | Annika Schmidt | DF | Houston Dash | Out of Contract | |
| November 15, 2022 | (United States) | Natalie Jacobs | DF | Natalie Jacobs | Out of Contract | |
| November 15, 2022 | (United States) | Lindsey Harris | GK | | Out of Contract and Not Returning in 2023 | |
| November 15, 2022 | (Jamaica) | Tiernny Wiltshire | MF | | Out of Contract and Not Returning in 2023 | |
| November 15, 2022 | (United States) | Brianna Visalli | MF | Brighton & Hove Albion | Out of Contract and Not Returning in 2023 | |
| February 19, 2023 | (United States) | Julia Ashley | DF | | Waived | |
| June 10, 2023 | (United States) | Annika Creel | DF | | Waived | |
| June 16, 2023 | (United States) | Kelcie Hedge | MF | | Mutual Agreement | |
| September 8, 2023 | (England) | Ebony Salmon | FW | Aston Villa W.F.C. | Undisclosed | |

=== Loan out ===
| No. | Pos. | Player | Loaned to | Start | End | Source |
|---|---|---|---|---|---|---|
| 24 | FW | (Argentina) Paulina Gramaglia | (Brazil) Red Bull Bragantino | February 10, 2023 | December 31, 2023 | |

== Staff ==
As of 8 September 2023

| Role | Name |
|---|---|
| President | (United States) Jessica O'Neill |
| General manager | (United States) Alex Singer |
| Head coach | (England) Sarah Lowdon (interim) |
| Assistant coach | (Nigeria) Michael Balogun |
| Assistant coach | (United States) Ricky Clarke |
| Goalkeeping coach | (United States) Matt Lampson |
| Assistant coach Video analyst | (United States) Hiro Suzuki |
| Assistant general manager | (United States) Carlos Martinez-Gloria |
| Equipment manager | (United States) Paloma Paez |
| Head athletic trainer | (United States) Frances Gilbert-Carlson |
| High performance coach | (United States) Corey Ashe |

== Non-competitive fixtures ==
| San Diego Wave FC | v | Houston Dash |

| Houston Dash | v | Kansas City Current |

| March 11, 2023 | Houston Dash | v | TCU | Houston, Texas |
| | | | | Stadium: Shell Energy Stadium |

| April 11 Mexico Women's Tour | Houston Dash | 1–5 | Mexico | Houston, United States |
| 19:00 UTC−5 | | | | Stadium: Shell Energy Stadium |

== Competitions ==
=== 2023 National Women's Soccer League season ===
==== Regular-season standings ====
| Pos | Team | Pld | W | D | L | GF | GA | GD | Pts |
|---|---|---|---|---|---|---|---|---|---|
| 8 | Washington Spirit | 22 | 7 | 9 | 6 | 26 | 29 | −3 | 30 |
| 9 | Racing Louisville FC | 22 | 6 | 9 | 7 | 25 | 24 | +1 | 27 |
| 10 | Houston Dash | 22 | 6 | 8 | 8 | 16 | 18 | −2 | 26 |
| 11 | Kansas City Current | 22 | 8 | 2 | 12 | 30 | 36 | −6 | 26 |
| 12 | Chicago Red Stars | 22 | 7 | 3 | 12 | 28 | 50 | −22 | 24 |

Source: NWSL
Rules for classification: Tiebreakers

===== Results summary =====
| Overall | | | | | | | | Home | | | | | | Away | | | | | |
| Pld | W | D | L | GF | GA | GD | Pts | W | D | L | GF | GA | GD | W | D | L | GF | GA | GD |
|---|---|---|---|---|---|---|---|---|---|---|---|---|---|---|---|---|---|---|---|
| 22 | 6 | 8 | 8 | 16 | 18 | −2 | 26 | 2 | 5 | 4 | 8 | 11 | −3 | 4 | 3 | 4 | 8 | 7 | +1 |

Last updated: October 16, 2023.
Source: NWSLsoccer.com

===== Results by matchday =====
| Matchday | 1 | 2 | 3 | 4 | 5 | 6 | 7 | 8 | 9 | 10 | 11 | 12 | 13 | 14 | 15 | 16 | 17 | 18 | 19 | 20 | 21 | 22 |
|---|---|---|---|---|---|---|---|---|---|---|---|---|---|---|---|---|---|---|---|---|---|---|
| Stadium | H | A | A | A | H | A | H | H | A | H | H | H | A | A | H | H | H | A | A | A | H | A |
| Result | D | W | D | D | L | L | W | L | W | W | D | D | D | L | L | D | D | L | W | W | L | L |
| Position | 6 | 4 | 3 | 6 | 6 | 8 | 6 | 10 | 7 | 6 | 7 | 7 | 7 | 7 | 9 | 8 | 9 | 10 | 10 | 8 | 10 | 10 |

Updated to match(es) played on October 16, 2023. Source: NWSL
A = Away; H = Home; W = Win; D = Draw; L = Loss

==== Season results ====
| March 26, 2023 1 | Houston Dash | 0–0 | Racing Louisville FC | Houston, Texas |
| 6:00 pm CDT | Anderson (yellow card) 15'; Jacobs (yellow card) 55'; Schmidt (yellow card) 58'; Viggiano (yellow card) 63' | Report | Borges (yellow card) 62'; Holloway (yellow card) 71' | Stadium: Shell Energy Stadium; Attendance: 5,722; Referee: Danielle Chesky |

| April 1, 2023 2 | Chicago Red Stars | 1–2 | Houston Dash | Bridgeview, Illinois |
| 1:00 pm CDT | Jacobs 19' (o.g.) | Report | Sánchez 4'; Schmidt (yellow card) 51'; Ordóñez 60' (pen.) | Stadium: SeatGeek Stadium; Attendance: 4,065; Referee: Karen Callado |

| April 14, 2023 3 | Portland Thorns FC | 1–1 | Houston Dash | Portland, Oregon |
| 9:30 pm CDT | Dunn 9' | Report | Sánchez 24' | Stadium: Providence Park; Attendance: 15,657; Referee: Alexandra Billeter |

| April 22, 2023 4 | Washington Spirit | 0–0 | Houston Dash | Washington, D.C. |
| 6:00 pm CDT | Brooks (yellow card) 39'; Staab (yellow card) 64' | Report | | Stadium: Audi Field; Attendance: 7,073; Referee: Elton Garcia |

| April 28, 2023 5 | Houston Dash | 0–1 | North Carolina Courage | Houston, Texas |
| 7:30 pm CDT | Sánchez (yellow card) 20' | Report | Lussi 33' | Stadium: Shell Energy Stadium; Referee: Thomas Snyder |
Note: Game abandoned in 52nd minute due to weather concerns, result based on league rules

| May 6, 2023 6 | OL Reign | 2–0 | Houston Dash | Seattle, Washington |
| 9:00 pm CDT | Latsko 53' (Rapinoe); Huitema 68' (Latsko); Stanton (yellow card) 90+3' | Report | | Stadium: Lumen Field; Attendance: 6,132; Referee: Brandon Stevis |

| May 12, 2023 7 | Houston Dash | 2–1 | Portland Thorns FC | Houston, Texas |
| 7:30 pm CDT | Anderson 59'; Salmon 71' | Report | Rodríguez 34'; Nally (yellow card) 90' | Stadium: Shell Energy Stadium; Attendance: 4,638; Referee: Ekaterina Koroleva |

| May 20, 2023 8 | Houston Dash | 0–3 | San Diego Wave FC | Houston, Texas |
| 7:30 pm CDT | Jacobs (yellow card) 13'; Dydasco (yellow card) 39'; Anderson (yellow card) 89' | Report | Morgan 2'; Colaprico (yellow card) 35'; Enge 58'; Pogarch 79' | Stadium: Shell Energy Stadium; Attendance: 5,966; Referee: Elijio Arreguin |

| May 26, 2023 9 | Kansas City Current | 0–2 | Houston Dash | Kansas City, Kansas |
| 7:00 pm CDT | | Report | Ordóñez 42'; Prisock 54' | Stadium: Children's Mercy Park; Attendance: 9,897; Referee: Alyssa Nichols |

| June 3, 2023 10 | Houston Dash | 2–0 | Orlando Pride | Houston, Texas |
| 7:30 pm CDT | Hirst 6'; Anderson (yellow card) 11'; Alozie 41'; Tucker (yellow card) 75' | Report | Madril (yellow card) 61' | Stadium: Shell Energy Stadium; Attendance: 4,863; Referee: Adam Kilpatrick |

| June 11, 2023 11 | Houston Dash | 1–1 | NJ/NY Gotham FC | Houston, Texas |
| 6:00 pm CDT | María Sánchez 36'; Laity (yellow card) 65'; Chapman (yellow card) 79'; Jacobs (yellow card) 88'; Dydasco (yellow card) 90+12' | Report | Lynn Williams 52' (pen.); O'Hara (yellow card) 85' | Stadium: Shell Energy Stadium; Attendance: 5,827; Referee: Alexandra Billeter |

| June 17, 2023 12 | Houston Dash | 0–0 | OL Reign | Houston, Texas |
| 7:30 pm CDT | Jacobs (red card) 45+1'; Laity (yellow card) 45+7' | Report | | Stadium: Shell Energy Stadium; Attendance: 8,128; Referee: Danielle Chesky |

| June 25, 2023 13 | Angel City FC | 0–0 | Houston Dash | Los Angeles, California |
| 7:00 pm CDT | Weatherholt (yellow card) 62'; Vignola (yellow card) 88' | Report | Lind (red card) 58' | Stadium: BMO Stadium; Attendance: 22,000; Referee: Sergii Demianchuk |

| July 1, 2023 14 | North Carolina Courage | 1–0 | Houston Dash | Cary, North Carolina |
| 7:30 pm CDT | Lussi 59' | Report | Dydasco (yellow card) 45+3'; Anderson (yellow card) 81'; Olivieri (yellow card) 90+2' | Stadium: WakeMed Soccer Park; Attendance: 4,387; Referee: Rebecca Pagan |
Note: Kickoff delayed from 6:30 p.m. by thunderstorms in the area.

| July 7, 2023 15 | Houston Dash | 0–1 | Chicago Red Stars | Houston, Texas |
| 7:30 pm CDT | Petersen (yellow card) 86'; Olivieri (yellow card) 90+7' | Report | Hocking 69' | Stadium: Shell Energy Stadium; Attendance: 4,892; Referee: Alyssa Nichols |

| August 19, 2023 16 | Houston Dash | 1–1 | Washington Spirit | Houston, Texas |
| 7:30 pm CDT | Alozie (yellow card) 21'; Sánchez 90+1' | Report | Sanchez 63' | Stadium: Shell Energy Stadium; Attendance: 4,822; Referee: Eric Tattersall |

| August 26, 2023 17 | Houston Dash | 1–1 | Kansas City Current | Houston, Texas |
| 7:30 pm CDT | Jacobs (yellow card) 4'; Alozie 67' | Report | LaBonta 51'; Cooper (yellow card) 61'; Rodriguez (yellow card) 90+7' | Stadium: Shell Energy Stadium; Attendance: 4,536; Referee: Shawn Tehini |

| September 3, 2023 18 | San Diego Wave FC | 1–0 | Houston Dash | San Diego, California |
| 7:00 pm CDT | Shaw 57' (Westphal); Jakobsson (yellow card) 83' | Report | Alozie (red card) 33'; Schmidt (yellow card) 49' | Stadium: Snapdragon Stadium; Attendance: 24,936; Referee: Katja Koroleva |

| September 15, 2023 19 | Racing Louisville FC | 0–1 | Houston Dash | Louisville, Kentucky |
| 6:30 pm CDT | | Report | DiGrande (yellow card) 2'; Sánchez 54' (yellow card) 51'; Puntigam (yellow card) 83' | Stadium: Lynn Family Stadium; Attendance: 5,526; Referee: Elvis Osmanovic |

| October 1, 2023 20 | NJ/NY Gotham FC | 0–2 | Houston Dash | Harrison, New Jersey |
| 5:30 pm CDT | Purce (yellow card) 49'; Farrelly (yellow card) 54'; Haught (yellow card) 68' | Report | Alozie 45+4', 67' | Stadium: Red Bull Arena; Attendance: 6,001; Referee: Elijio Arreguin |

| October 8, 2023 21 | Houston Dash | 1–2 | Angel City FC | Houston, Texas |
| 6:00 pm CDT | Andressa 44' | Report | Nielsen (yellow card) 39'; Thompson 68'; McCaskill 90+1' | Stadium: Shell Energy Stadium; Attendance: 9,175; Referee: Katja Koroleva |

| October 15, 2023 22 | Orlando Pride | 1–0 | Houston Dash | Orlando, Florida |
| 4:00 pm CDT | Marta 87' (pen.); Watt (yellow card) 89' | Report | Puntigam (yellow card) 29'; Sánchez (yellow card) 81' | Stadium: Exploria Stadium; Attendance: 8,504; Referee: Natalie Simon |

=== 2023 NWSL Challenge Cup ===
==== Divisional standings ====
| Pos | Team | Pld | W | T | L | GF | GA | GD | Pts | Qualification | KC | LOU | HOU | CHI |
|---|---|---|---|---|---|---|---|---|---|---|---|---|---|---|
| 1 | Kansas City Current | 6 | 4 | 1 | 1 | 14 | 4 | +10 | 13 | Advance to knockout stage | — | 3–0 | 3–1 | 4–0 |
| 2 | Racing Louisville FC | 6 | 4 | 0 | 2 | 10 | 6 | +4 | 12 | Advance to knockout stage based on ranking | 3–2 | — | 3–0 | 2–0 |
| 3 | Houston Dash | 6 | 2 | 0 | 4 | 4 | 11 | −7 | 6 | | 0–2 | 1–0 | — | 2–0 |
| 4 | Chicago Red Stars | 6 | 1 | 1 | 4 | 3 | 10 | −7 | 4 | | 0–0 | 0–2 | 3–0 | — |

Source: NWSL

==== Group stage ====
| April 19, 2023 1 | Houston Dash | 0–2 | Kansas City Current | Houston, Texas |
| 6:30 pm CST | Jennings (yellow card) 83' | Report | Kizer 36', 66'; Weber (yellow card) 84'; Merrick (yellow card) 88' | Stadium: Shell Energy Stadium; Attendance: 4,124; Referee: Laura Rodriguez |

| May 3, 2023 2 | Houston Dash | 2–0 | Chicago Red Stars | Houston, Texas |
| 8:00 pm CST | Olivieri 5', (yellow card) 86'; Desiano (yellow card) 68'; Ordóñez 72' (pen.) | Report | Nagasato (yellow card) 33' | Stadium: Shell Energy Stadium; Attendance: 3,696; Referee: Adorae Monroy |

| June 14, 2023 3 | Racing Louisville FC | 3–0 | Houston Dash | Louisville, Kentucky |
| 8:00 pm CST | Kanu (yellow card) 8'; Fischer 45+4'; DeMelo 45+6'; Goins 73' | Report | Jennings (yellow card) 41' | Stadium: Lynn Family Stadium; Attendance: 4,983; Referee: JC Grigs |

| July 22, 2023 4 | Kansas City Current | 3–1 | Houston Dash | Kansas City, Kansas |
| 8:00 pm CST | Cooper (yellow card) 35'; Hamilton 45+1', 45+4', 68' | Report | Desiano 17'; Salmon (yellow card) 57'; Harris (yellow card) 90+4' | Stadium: Children's Mercy Park; Attendance: 11,014 |

| July 29, 2023 5 | Houston Dash | 1–0 | Racing Louisville FC | Houston, Texas |
| 8:30 pm CST | Salmon 26'; Lind (yellow card) 44'; Jane Campbell (yellow card) 90+5' | Report | Pickett (yellow card) 60' | Stadium: Shell Energy Stadium; Referee: Gerald Flores |

| August 5, 2023 6 | Chicago Red Stars | 3–0 | Houston Dash | Bridgeview, Illinois |
| 8:00 pm CST | Hocking 37', 43'; Nagasoto 50' | Report | Petersen (yellow card) 72' | Stadium: SeatGeek Stadium; Attendance: 3,137 |

== Awards and honors ==
=== NWSL Best XI ===
| Team | Player | Position | Ref. |
|---|---|---|---|
| First Team | (United States) Jane Campbell | GK | |

=== NWSL Goalkeeper of the Year ===
| Player | Ref. |
|---|---|
| (United States) Jane Campbell | |

=== Best XI of the month ===
| Month | Player | Position | Ref. |
|---|---|---|---|
| September/October | (United States) Jane Campbell | GK | |
| September/October | (United States) Caprice Dydasco | DF | |

== See also ==
- 2023 National Women's Soccer League season
- 2023 in American soccer
