= 2022 Houston Dash season =

Houston Dash
2022 season
- Majority owner: Ted Segal
- President: Jessica O'Neill
- Acting Head Coach Interim head coach: Sarah Lowdon; Juan Carlos Amorós
- Stadium: PNC Stadium, Houston
- NWSL: 4th
- Playoffs: 1st Round
- Challenge Cup: Group stage
- Copa Tejas Shield: 3rd
- Top goalscorer: Ebony Salmon (9)
- Highest home attendance: 7,798 (Sept. 24 vs. SEA)
- Lowest home attendance: 4,637 (July 16 vs. CHI)
- Average home league attendance: 5,644
- Biggest win: 5-0 vs ORL (6/3)
- Biggest defeat: 0–4 vs POR (6/12)
Home colors	Away colors
- All statistics correct as of October 16, 2023.

The 2022 Houston Dash season was the team's ninth season as an American professional women's soccer team in the National Women's Soccer League.

The 2022 NWSL season ran from May 7, 2022, to October 2, 2022, following the 2022 NWSL Challenge Cup.

== Season ==
The Dash started the season taking part in the 2022 NWSL Challenge Cup. Houston finished in 4th place in Central Division with 2 wins and 4 losses. On April 27, 2022, the team suspended coach James Clarkson for allegations of discrimination, harassment, and abuse, based on an investigation started by the NWSL and NWSLPA the prior season. The Houston Dash appointed assistant coach Sarah Lowdon as acting head coach. The Dash went on a six-game unbeaten streak during Lowdon's tenure including a 2–0 away win at the Portland Thorns and a 5–0 win at home against the Orlando Pride with Nichelle Prince scoring the club's first hat trick. On June 15, 2022, the Dash appointed Amorós as the club's new interim head coach pending visa approval. Amorós would not join the team until July 12 while waiting for his visa. In his first match managing the dash on 16 July, with newly acquired striker Ebony Salmon scoring a hat-trick, the Dash under Amorós defeated the Chicago Red Stars 4–1.

On August 24, 2022, the Dash hired former NWSL player Alex Singer as general manager.

== Roster ==
As of October 16, 2022.

No.	Name	Nationality	Position(s)	Date of birth (age)	Signed in	Previous club	Apps	Goals
Goalkeepers
1	Jane Campbell	(United States)	GK	February 17, 1995 (age 31)	2017	(United States) Stanford Cardinal	23	0
20	Lindsey Harris	(United States)	GK	November 19, 1993 (age 32)	2020	(Norway) Klepp	1	0
33	Ella Dederick	(United States)	GK	July 27, 1996 (age 30)	2021	(United States) OL Reign	0	0
Defenders
2	Allysha Chapman	(Canada)	DF	January 25, 1989 (age 37)	2018	(United States) North Carolina Courage	14	0
5	Caprice Dydasco	(United States)	DF	August 19, 1993 (age 33)	2022	(United States) NJ/NY Gotham	8	0
9	~~Haley Hanson~~	(United States)	DF	February 2, 1996 (age 30)	2018	(United States) Nebraska Cornhuskers	15	0
12	Julia Ashley	(United States)	DF	November 11, 1996 (age 30)	2022	(United States) Racing Louisville	5	0
23	Ally Prisock	(United States)	DF	January 18, 1997 (age 29)	2021	(United States) USC Trojans	24	0
25	Katie Naughton	(United States)	DF	February 15, 1994 (age 32)	2020	(Australia) Perth Glory	24	0
27	Annika Schmidt	(United States)	DF	May 4, 1993 (age 33)	2022	(United States) Butler Bulldogs	0	0
30	Natalie Jacobs	(United States)	DF	August 16, 1997 (age 29)	2022	(Spain) Real Betis	15	0
41	Machaela George	(United States)	DF	October 3, 1997 (age 29)	2022	(Portugal) SC Braga	0	0
44	Tiernny Wiltshire	(Jamaica)	DF	May 8, 1998 (age 28)	2022	(Finland) Kuopion Palloseura	0	0
Midfielders
7	María Sánchez	(Mexico)	MF	February 20, 1996 (age 30)	2021	(Mexico) Tigres UANL	22	1
10	Shea Groom	(United States)	MF	May 4, 1993 (age 33)	2020	(United States) Reign FC	20	1
13	Sophie Schmidt	(Canada)	MF	June 28, 1998 (age 28)	2019	(Germany) FFC Frankfurt	20	4
14	Brianna Visalli	(United States)	MF	April 17, 1995 (age 31)	2020	(England) Birmingham City	16	1
15	Marisa Viggiano	(United States)	MF	February 5, 1997 (age 29)	2022	(United States) Orlando Pride	22	3
17	Kelcie Hedge	(United States)	MF	September 19, 1997 (age 29)	2021	(United States) OL Reign	3	0
18	Emily Ogle	(United States)	MF	August 5, 1996 (age 30)	2021	(United States) Portland Thorns	16	0
26	Makamae Gomera-Stevens	(United States)	MF	March 17, 1999 (age 27)	2021	(United States) Washington State Cougars	3	0
31	~~Kayla Hamric~~	(Canada)	MF	December 8, 1998 (age 27)	2022	(Iceland) UF Fjölnir	0	0
44	~~Maegan Rosa~~	(Canada)	MF	February 19, 1992 (age 34)	2022	(United States) Houston Dash	0	0
66	~~Haley Berg~~	(United States)	MF	September 23, 1998 (age 28)	2022	(Spain) Zaragoza CFF	0	0
Forwards
3	~~Rachel Daly~~	(England)	FW	December 6, 1991 (age 34)	2016	(United States) SoCal fC	6	4
8	Nichelle Prince	(Canada)	FW	February 15, 1995 (age 31)	2017	(United States) Ohio State Buckeyes	20	6
11	Ebony Salmon	(England)	FW	January 27, 2001 (age 25)	2022	(United States) Racing Louisville	14	9
19	Elizabeth Eddy	(United States)	FW	September 13, 1991 (age 35)	2022	(United States) NJ/NY Gotham	15	2
21	Ryan Gareis	(United States)	FW	November 13, 1998 (age 28)	2022	(United States) South Carolina Gamecocks	15	0
22	Michelle Alozie	(Nigeria)	FW	April 28, 1997 (age 29)	2021	(United States) Tennessee Lady Volunteers	12	2
24	Paulina Gramaglia	(Argentina)	FW	March 21, 2003 (age 23)	2022	(Argentina) UAI Urquiza	1	0
28	Cali Farquharson	(United States)	FW	December 17, 1993 (age 32)	2022	(Sweden) KIF Örebro	6	0
29	Joelle Anderson	(United States)	FW	October 6, 1998 (age 28)	2022	(United States) Pepperdine Waves	9	1
34	Michaela Abam	(Cameroon)	FW	June 12, 1997 (age 29)	2021	(Spain) Real Betis	13	0
89	Valérie Gauvin	(France)	FW	June 1, 1996 (age 30)	2022	(United States) North Carolina Courage	2	0

~~Struck~~ players are no longer with the team.

== Staff ==
As of 24 August 2022

Role	Name
President	(United States) Jessica O'Neill
General manager	(United States) Alex Singer
Interim head coach	(Spain) Juan Carlos Amorós
Acting Head Coach/First Assistant Coach	(England) Sarah Lowdon
Assistant coach	(Nigeria) Michael Balogun
Assistant coach Video analyst	(United States) Hiro Suzuki
Assistant general manager	(United States) Carlos Martinez-Gloria
Equipment manager	(United States) Paloma Paez
Head athletic trainer	(United States) Frances Gilbert-Carlson
High performance coach	(United States) Corey Ashe

== Competitions ==
=== 2022 NWSL Challenge Cup ===
March 20, 2022	Houston Dash	1–3	Chicago Red Stars	Houston, TX
	Naughton 19'; Visalli (yellow card) 65'; Schmidt (yellow card) 88'	Report	St-Georges (yellow card) 18'; Pugh 27', 60'; Morse (yellow card) 45+2'; Wright 58' (pen.)	Stadium: PNC Stadium; Attendance: 4,087

March 25, 2022	Racing Louisville FC	2–3	Houston Dash	Louisville, KY
	Davis 16'; McDonald 40'; Olofsson (yellow card) 61'	Report	Viggiano (yellow card) 4' (goal) 58'; Chapman (yellow card) 19'; Sánchez 56'; Daly 65' (pen.)	Stadium: Lynn Family Stadium; Attendance: 3,800

March 30, 2022	Houston Dash	0–3	Kansas City Current	Houston, TX
	Gomera-Stevens (yellow card) 31'; Priscock (yellow card) 56'	Report	Leach 2'; Hamilton 28'; Miller (yellow card) 45+1'; Mace (yellow card) 50'; LaBonta 60'	Stadium: PNC Stadium; Attendance: 2,229

April 2, 2022	Chicago Red Stars	2–0	Houston Dash	Bridgeview, IL
	St-Georges (yellow card) 6'; Pugh 32', 82'	Report		Stadium: SeatGeek Stadium; Attendance: 1,721; Referee: Katja Koroleva

April 15, 2022	Kansas City Current	2–1	Houston Dash	Kansas City, KS
	Hamilton 4'; Ball (yellow card) 36'; Pickett 80'	Report	Groom 59'; Hedge (yellow card) 75'; Abam (yellow card) 79'	Stadium: Children's Mercy Park; Attendance: 5,022

April 24, 2022	Houston Dash	2–1	Racing Louisville	Houston, TX
6:00 pm CDT	Prince 24'; Eddy (yellow card) 29'; Prisock 35'; Anderson (yellow card) 61'	Report	Milliet (yellow card) 10'; Howell 29'; Martin (yellow card) 67'	Stadium: PNC Stadium; Attendance: 3,073

==== Divisional standings ====
Pos	Team	Pld	W	T	L	GF	GA	GD	Pts	Qualification	KC	CHI	LOU	HOU
1	Kansas City Current	6	4	1	1	10	7	+3	13	Advance to knockout stage	—	2–1	0–3	2–1
2	Chicago Red Stars	6	2	2	2	8	6	+2	8		1–2	—	0–0	2–0
3	Racing Louisville FC	6	1	3	2	8	7	+1	6		1–1	1–1	—	2–3
4	Houston Dash	6	2	0	4	7	13	−6	6		0–3	1–3	2–1	—

Source: NWSL
Rules for classification: 1) Total points; 2) Total goal differential; 3) Total number of goals scored; 4) Head-to-head points record; 5) Head-to-head goal differential; 6) Head-to-head number of goals scored; 7) Fewest disciplinary points; 8) Drawing of lots

=== 2022 National Women's Soccer League season ===
==== Season results ====
May 1, 2022 1	Houston Dash	0–1	San Diego Wave FC	Houston, TX
6:00 pm	Groom (yellow card) 90+4'	Report	van Egmond (yellow card) 45+1'; Taylor 86'	Stadium: PNC Stadium; Attendance: 7,722

May 8, 2022 2	Kansas City Current	0–2	Houston Dash	Kansas City, KS
4:00 pm	Scott (yellow card) 67'; Loera (yellow card) 90+2'	Report	Daly 40' (pen.); Sánchez (yellow card) 75'; Visalli 90+6'	Stadium: Children's Mercy Park; Attendance: 6,140

May 14, 2022 3	Racing Louisville FC	1–1	Houston Dash	Louisville, KY
7:00 pm CT	Martin (yellow card) 67'; McDonald 82'	Report	Hanson (yellow card) 60'; Prince 77'; Hedge (yellow card) 79'; Daly (yellow card) 89'	Stadium: Lynn Family Stadium; Attendance: 5,271; Referee: Samantha Martinez

May 21, 2022 4	Portland Thorns FC	0–2	Houston Dash	Portland, OR
5:00 pm CDT	Porter (yellow card) 64'	Report	Daly 45+3'; Schmidt 66'	Stadium: Providence Park; Attendance: 14,842; Referee: Michael Radchuk

May 29, 2022 5	Houston Dash	1–1	North Carolina Courage	Houston, TX
6:00 pm CDT	Daly 45+6'	Report	Ordoñez 24'; Kurtz (yellow card) 80'	Stadium: PNC Stadium; Attendance: 4,852

June 3, 2022 6	Houston Dash	5–0	Orlando Pride	Houston, TX
7:30 pm CDT	Prince 27', 39', 49'; Daly 32'; Campbell (yellow card) 63'; Alozie 87'	Report		Stadium: PNC Stadium; Attendance: 6,073

June 7, 2022 7	Angel City FC	0–0	Houston Dash	Los Angeles
19:00 PDT		Report	Hanson (yellow card) 58'	Stadium: Banc of California Stadium; Attendance: 16,739

June 12, 2022 8	Houston Dash	0–4	Portland Thorns FC	Houston, TX
18:00 CDT	Groom (yellow card) 22'	Report	Naughton 1' (o.g.); Smith 23' (pen.), 82'; Pogarch (yellow card) 67'; Moultrie 74'; Bixby (yellow card) 88'	Stadium: PNC Stadium; Attendance: 5,006; Referee: Karen Callado

June 19, 2022 9	North Carolina Courage	3–4	Houston Dash	Cary, NC
4:00 pm CDT	O'Sullivan 6'; Ordoñez 57'; Debinha 59'	Report	Sánchez 15' (yellow card) 76'; Eddy 47', 50'; Prince 51'	Stadium: WakeMed Soccer Park; Attendance: 4,117

July 1, 2022 10	Houston Dash	1–2	Kansas City Current	Houston, TX
7:30 pm CDT	Groom (yellow card) 42'; Eddy (yellow card) 54'; Hanson (yellow card) 71'; Salmon (yellow card) 90+2'; Prisock (yellow card) 90+7'; Ball 90+10' (o.g.)	Report	Loera (yellow card) 9'; LaBonta 42' (pen.); Mace 46'; Ball 90+10' (o.g.)	Stadium: PNC Stadium; Attendance: 5,007

July 8, 2022 11	Orlando Pride	1–0	Houston Dash	Orlando, FL
6:00 pm CDT	Prisock 79' (o.g.); Washington (yellow card) 90+1'	Report	Viggiano (yellow card) 88'	Stadium: Exploria Stadium; Attendance: 3,520; Referee: Natalie Simon

July 16, 2022 12	Houston Dash	4–1	Chicago Red Stars	Houston, TX
7:30 pm CDT	Salmon 11', 45+1', 55'; Anderson 90+3'	Report	Fisher 88'	Stadium: PNC Stadium; Attendance: 4,637

July 31, 2022 13	NJ/NY Gotham FC	2–4	Houston Dash	Harrison, NJ
4:00 pm CDT	Monaghan, (yellow card) 45+2'; Purce 82' (Jean)	Report	Freeman 18' (o.g.); Groom 36' (Sánchez); Schmidt 70' (Viggiano); Salmon 73' (pen.)	Stadium: Red Bull Arena; Attendance: 5,631; Referee: Adorae Monroy

August 7, 2022 14	OL Reign	1–2	Houston Dash	Seattle, WA
5:00 pm CDT	Rapinoe 16' (Little); Huitema (yellow card) 40'; Quinn (yellow card) 52'; Barnes (yellow card) 64'; López (yellow card) 85'	Report	Prisock (yellow card) 18'; Chapman (yellow card) 36'; Salmon 53' (pen.), 55' (Groom); Groom (yellow card) 65'	Stadium: Lumen Field; Attendance: 7,252; Referee: Danielle Chesky

August 12, 2022 15	Houston Dash	0–0	Racing Louisville FC	Houston, TX
7:30 pm CDT	Prince (yellow card) 59'	Report	Murray (yellow card) 33' (yellow-red card) 42'	Stadium: PNC Stadium; Attendance: 5,279; Referee: Katja Koroleva

August 17, 2022 16	Houston Dash	2–1	NJ/NY Gotham FC	Houston, TX
7:30 pm CDT	Salmon 73'; Viggiano 76' (Schmidt); Campbell (yellow card) 79'	Report	Purce (yellow card) 24' (yellow-red card) 58'; Onumonu (yellow card) 58'; Zerboni 80' (Mewis)	Stadium: PNC Stadium; Attendance: 4,753; Referee: Alex Billeter

August 20, 2022 17	San Diego Wave FC	3–1	Houston Dash	San Diego, CA
9:00 pm CDT	Morgan 13'; Kornieck (yellow card) 53'; Ali 67' (Morgan); Jakobsson 90' (Doniak)	Report	Salmon 7' (Jacobs)	Stadium: Torero Stadium; Attendance: 5,281; Referee: Brad Jensen

August 27, 2022 18	Houston Dash	2–2	Washington Spirit	Houston, TX
7:30 pm CDT	Schmidt 22'; Dydasco (yellow card) 45+3'; Jacobs (yellow card) 55'; Alozie 90+1'	Report	Brooks (yellow card) 42'; Hatch 53', 55'; Biegalski (yellow card) 85'	Stadium: PNC Stadium; Attendance: 5,031

September 11, 2022 19	Houston Dash	1–1	Angel City FC	Houston, TX
6:00 pm CDT	Sánchez 43' (Jacobs); Prince (yellow card) 69'	Report	Charley 49'	Stadium: PNC Stadium; Attendance: 5,927

September 17, 2022 20	Chicago Red Stars	0–1	Houston Dash	Bridgeview, IL
7:00 pm CDT	St-Georges (yellow card) 56'	Report	Salmon 25' (Prince); Prince (yellow card) 38'	Stadium: SeatGeek Stadium; Attendance: 5,488

September 24, 2022 21	Houston Dash	0–2	OL Reign	Houston, TX
7:30 pm CDT	Schmidt (yellow card) 60'; Visalli (yellow card) 78'; Groom (yellow card) 87'	Report	Balcer 29'; Fishlock (yellow card) 60'; Rapinoe (yellow card) 67'; Latsko 76'	Stadium: PNC Stadium; Attendance: 7,798; Referee: Matthew Franz

October 1, 2022 22	Washington Spirit	1–2	Houston Dash	District of Columbia
6:00 pm CDT	Sullivan 36' (pen.), (yellow card) 47'; Stabb (yellow card) 73'	Report	Viggiano 14'; Chapman (yellow card) 42'; Rodder 58' (o.g.); Schmidt (yellow card) 77'; Prisock (yellow card) 84'	Stadium: Audi Field; Attendance: 9,141

==== Post Season ====
October 16, 2022 1st Round	Houston Dash	1–2	Kansas City Current	Houston, TX
4:00 pm CDT	S. Schmidt 21'; Priscock (yellow card) 28'; Eddy (yellow card) 88'; Alozie (yellow card) 89'; Sánchez (yellow card) 90+1'	Report	Labonta 5' (pen.); Lavogez (yellow card) 10'; Mace (yellow card) 90+6'; Del Fava 90+10'	Stadium: PNC Stadium; Attendance: 21,284; Referee: Elijio Arreguin

==== Regular-season standings ====
Pos	Team	Pld	W	D	L	GF	GA	GD	Pts	Qualification
2	Portland Thorns FC (C)	22	10	9	3	49	24	+25	39	Playoffs – semi-finals
3	San Diego Wave FC	22	10	6	6	32	21	+11	36	Playoffs – first round
4	Houston Dash	22	10	6	6	35	27	+8	36	Playoffs – first round
5	Kansas City Current	22	10	6	6	29	29	0	36	Playoffs – first round
6	Chicago Red Stars	22	9	6	7	34	28	+6	33	Playoffs – first round

Source: NWSL
Rules for classification: Tiebreakers
(C) Champions

===== Results summary =====
Overall								Home						Away					
Pld	W	D	L	GF	GA	GD	Pts	W	D	L	GF	GA	GD	W	D	L	GF	GA	GD
22	10	6	6	35	27	+8	36	3	4	4	16	15	+1	7	2	2	19	12	+7

Last updated: October 1, 2022.
Source: NWSLsoccer.com

===== Results by matchday =====
Matchday	1	2	3	4	5	6	7	8	9	10	11	12	13	14	15	16	17	18	19	20	21	22
Stadium	H	A	A	A	H	H	A	H	A	H	A	H	A	A	H	H	A	H	H	A	H	A
Result	L	W	D	W	D	W	D	L	W	L	L	W	W	W	D	W	L	D	D	W	L	W
Position	10	5	4	4	4	2	2	5	4	5	6	4	5	3	2	2	3	2	4	2	5	4

Updated to match(es) played on October 1, 2022. Source: NWSL
A = Away; H = Home; W = Win; D = Draw; L = Loss

== Transactions ==
=== 2022 NWSL Expansion Draft ===
The 2022 NWSL Expansion Draft was an expansion draft held by the NWSL on December 16, 2021, for two expansion teams, Angel City FC and San Diego Wave FC, to select players from existing teams in the league.

On December 10, 2021, the NWSL released the protected lists from teams participating in the draft.

- **Bold** indicates players selected in the Expansion Draft
- Blue highlights indicate United States federation players
- Italics indicate players who are not under contract but whose NWSL playing rights remain with the team

Of the Houston Dash's unprotected player list, San Diego selected Kristie Mewis and Angel City selected Jasmyne Spencer.

Protected	Unprotected
Jane Campbell	Michaela Abam
Rachel Daly	Michelle Alozie
Makamae Gomera-Stevens	Joelle Anderson
Shea Groom	Bridgette Andrzejewski
Haley Hanson	Allysha Chapman
Katie Naughton	Taylor Comeau
Nichelle Prince	Niki Cross
Maria Sanchez	Amanda Dennis
Gabby Seiler	Hannah Diaz
	Marissa Diggs
	Lindsey Harris
	Melissa Henderson
	Bianca Henninger
	Savannah Jordan
	Veronica Latsko
	**Kristie Mewis**
	Christine Nairn
	Emily Ogle
	Megan Oyster
	Ally Prisock
	Annika Schmidt
	Sophie Schmidt
	**Jasmyne Spencer**
	Bri Visalli

=== 2022 NWSL Draft ===
Draft picks are not automatically signed to the team roster. The 2022 NWSL Draft was held on December 18, 2021.

Round	Pick	Nat.	Player	Pos.	College	Status	Ref.
4	46	(United States)	Ryan Gareis	FW	South Carolina	Signed a two-year contract.	

=== Transfers in ===
Date	Nat.	Player	Pos.	Previous club	Fee/notes	Ref.
December 17, 2021	(United States)	Julia Ashley	DF	(United States) Racing Louisville FC	Acquired in exchange for the 26th overall pick in the 2022 NWSL Draft.	
December 18, 2021	(United States)	Kelcie Hedge	MF	(United States) OL Reign	Acquired in exchange for the 22nd-overall pick in the 2022 NWSL Draft and $15,000 in allocation money.	
December 20, 2021	(Argentina)	Paulina Gramaglia	FW	(Argentina) UAI Urquiza	Acquired on loan from January 1, 2022, to December 31, 2022.	
December 22, 2021	(United States)	Ella Dederick	GK	(United States) OL Reign	Acquired in exchange for the Dash's natural third-round pick in the 2023 NWSL Draft.	
January 6, 2022	(Mexico)	María Sánchez	FW	(Mexico) Tigres UANL	Signed a two-year contract.	
January 28, 2022	(United States)	Marisa Viggiano	DF	(United States) Orlando Pride	Acquired in exchange for Megan Montefusco, $30,000 in allocation money, and OL Reign's natural third-round pick in the 2023 NWSL Draft.	
April 5, 2022	(United States)	Natalie Jacobs	MF	(Spain) Real Betis Féminas	Signed a National Team Replacement player contract.	
May 7, 2022	(United States)	Natalie Jacobs	MF	(United States) Houston Dash	Signed an Injury Replacement player contract.	
June 27, 2022	(England)	Ebony Salmon	FW	(United States) Racing Louisville FC	Acquired in exchange for up to $190,000 of allocation money, depending on performance-related conditions.	
August 19, 2022	(United States)	Caprice Dydasco	DF	(United States) NJ/NY Gotham FC	Acquired in exchange for $120,000 in allocation money, and up to $150,000, increasing by $10,000 per playoff appearance.	
August 23, 2022	(France)	Valérie Gauvin	FW	(United States) North Carolina Courage	Acquired in exchange for $25,000 in allocation money and a conditional second-round pick in the 2024 NWSL Draft.	
August 25, 2022	(Jamaica)	Tiernny Wiltshire	DF	(Finland) Kuopion Palloseura	Signed to a contract until the end of the 2022 season.	

=== Transfers out ===
Date	Nat.	Player	Pos.	Destination club	Fee/notes	Ref.
January 14, 2022	(United States)	Veronica Latsko	FW	(United States) OL Reign	Traded in exchange for $30,000 in allocation money and OL Reign's natural third-round pick in the 2023 NWSL Draft.	
January 28, 2022	(United States)	Megan Montefusco	DF	(United States) Orlando Pride	Traded with $30,000 in allocation money and OL Reign's natural third-round pick in the 2023 NWSL Draft in exchange for Marisa Viggiano.	
January 31, 2022	(United States)	Gabby Kessler	MF	None	Retired.	
April 22, 2022	(United States)	Natalie Jacobs	MF	None	National Team Replacement player contract expired.	
August 9, 2022	(England)	Rachel Daly	FW	(England) Aston Villa W.F.C.	Transferred for an undisclosed fee.	
August 18, 2022	(United States)	Haley Hanson	DF	(United States) Orlando Pride	Traded in exchange for $75,000 in allocation money and a second-round pick in the 2023 NWSL Draft.	

== Awards and honors ==
=== NWSL Best XI ===
Award	Awardee	Position	Ref
NWSL Best XI Second Team	Ebony Salmon	FW	

=== End-of-season Team awards ===
Award	Winner	Position	Ref
Most Valuable Player	Sophie Schmidt	MF	
Player's Player of the Year	Sophie Schmidt	MF	
Golden Boot	Ebony Salmon	FW	
Defender of the Year	Jane Campbell	GK	
Newcomer of the Year	Marisa Viggiano	MF	
Young Player of the Year	Ryan Gareis	FW	

== See also ==
- 2022 National Women's Soccer League season
- 2022 in American soccer
