= María Sánchez (footballer) =

Mexican footballer (born 1996)

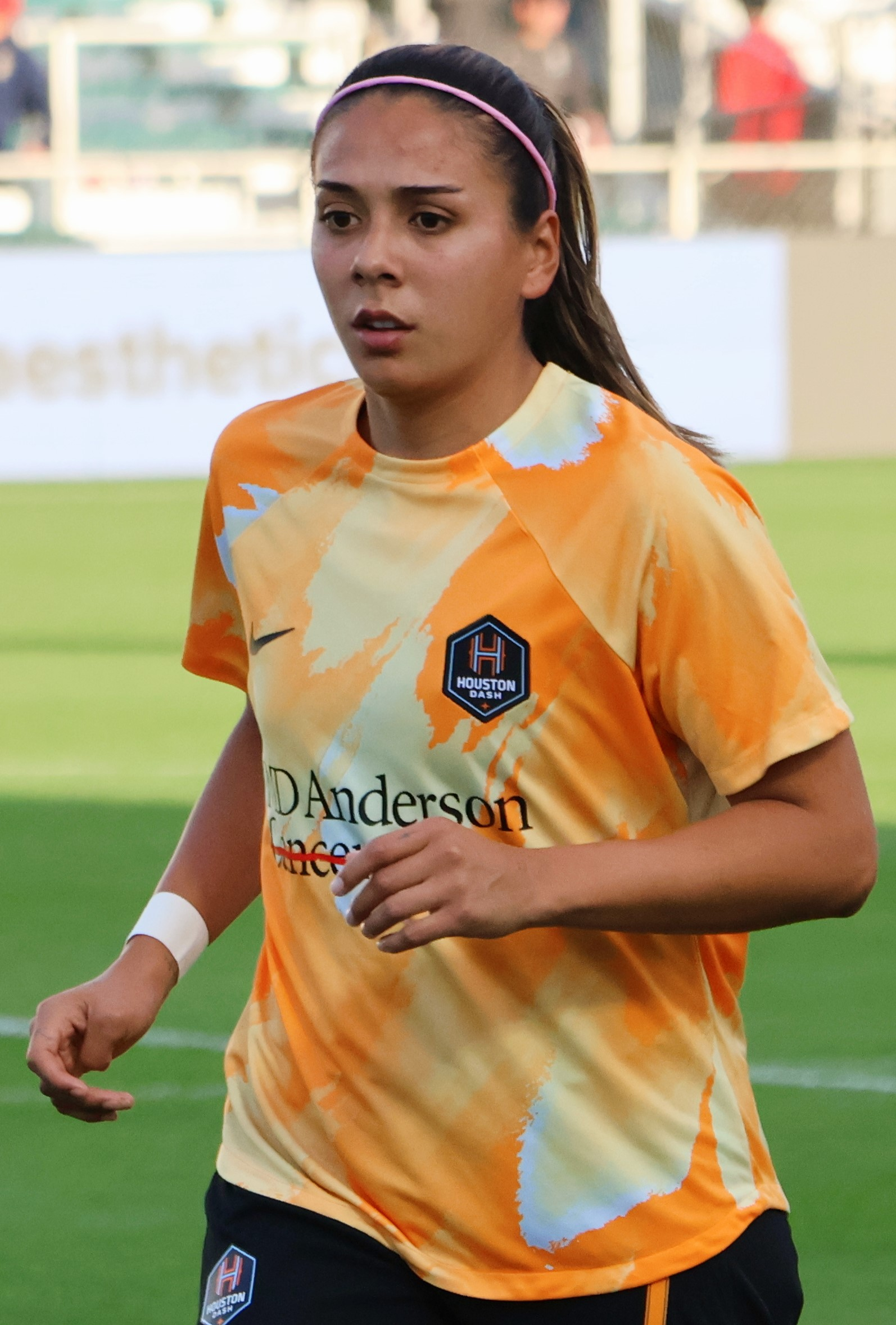
- Sánchez with the Houston Dash in 2024

Personal information
- Full name: María Guadalupe Sánchez Morales
- Date of birth: 20 February 1996 (age 30)
- Place of birth: Nampa, Idaho, U.S.
- Height: 1.65 m (5 ft 5 in)
- Position: Winger

Team information
- Current team: UANL
- Number: 7

Youth career
- 2010–2013: American Falls HS

College career
Years	Team	Apps	(Gls)
2014–2015	Idaho State Bengals	37	(22)
2017–2018	Santa Clara Broncos	42	(13)

Senior career*
Years	Team	Apps	(Gls)
2019	Chicago Red Stars	7	(0)
2020	Guadalajara	21	(5)
2021	UANL	34	(9)
2021	→ Houston Dash (loan)	3	(1)
2022–2024	Houston Dash	48	(7)
2024–2025	San Diego Wave	34	(4)
2025–	UANL	28	(8)

International career^{‡}
2010	Mexico U17		
2015–2016	Mexico U20	9	(3)
2015–	Mexico	63	(14)
Medal record
Women's football
Representing Mexico
Pan American Games
Gold medal – first place	2023 Santiago	Team
- * Club domestic league appearances and goals as of 2 September 2025 ‡ National team caps and goals as of 20 April 2024

María Guadalupe Sánchez Morales (born 20 February 1996) is a professional footballer who plays as a forward for Liga MX Femenil club Tigres UANL. Born in the United States, she plays for the Mexico national team.

Sánchez played college soccer at Idaho State University before leaving in April 2016. She subsequently concluded her collegiate career at Santa Clara University in 2018.

Sánchez began her professional career with American club Chicago Red Stars, who selected Sánchez with the fifteenth overall pick in the 2019 NWSL College Draft. After the 2019 NWSL season, Sánchez signed with Guadalajara of the Liga MX Femenil for 2020. In 2021, she moved to Tigres UANL and won the 2021 Clausura title. In the summer of 2021, she had a month-long loan to NWSL club Houston Dash, who later signed her permanently. In 2024, she signed with the San Diego Wave.

A senior and former youth Mexican international, Sánchez played at the 2015 FIFA Women's World Cup and the 2016 FIFA U-20 Women's World Cup.

== Early life ==
Sánchez is the daughter of Mexican-born Roberto Sánchez and Irene Morales, who as of 2015 were employed at a potato processing plant in American Falls, Idaho, United States. No club team was locally available, nor could her parents afford the costs of enrolling her on an elite club team, so Sánchez played only high school soccer. Sánchez was a four-year letter-winner at American Falls High School. She was the scoring leader in the state of Idaho in all four years, scoring 26, 34, 50, and 78 goals in her freshman, sophomore, junior, and senior years, respectively. Her number was later retired by American Falls High School.

== College career ==
=== Idaho State University ===
Despite her high school record, Idaho State Bengals was the only collegiate program that offered Sánchez a scholarship because she did not play elite club soccer. Sánchez played for Idaho State in 2014 and 2015. As a freshman in 2014, Sánchez scored seven goals and led the team and conference with 8 assists. She was named to the Big Sky Conference All-Academic team. In her sophomore year, for a team that had a record of one win, one tie, and 15 losses, Sánchez scored 15 goals and had 4 assists in 17 games. She was named to the All-Conference team.

==== Controversy ====
In April 2016, Sánchez announced she was leaving Idaho State University to seek a more "competitive environment." Idaho State denied her permission to contact other universities and alleged that a third party was assisting her contrary to NCAA rules. About 50 university teams had expressed interest in her, but Idaho State denied her request to communicate with five universities, all major women's soccer powers. Idaho State further alleged that those five schools had communicated with Sánchez without permission. Sánchez denied the allegations and responded that Idaho State was blocking her soccer career. Idaho State subsequently granted her request to contact Santa Clara University and University of South Florida.

=== Santa Clara University ===
Sánchez enrolled at Santa Clara in January 2017 and began playing for the Santa Clara Broncos. She appeared in all 23 games in 2017, scored five goals, and tied for the West Coast Conference lead with six assists. In 2018, Sánchez appeared in 19 games and scored eight goals. She had 16 assists, first among players in all NCAA Division I programs.

== Club career ==
=== Chicago Red Stars ===
On 11 January 2019, Sánchez was drafted by the Chicago Red Stars of the National Women's Soccer League (NWSL). She made seven appearances with the club in 2019.

=== Guadalajara ===
On 13 December 2019, Sánchez was announced by Liga MX Femenil club CD Guadalajara as their next signing on loan for the Clausura 2020. She wore number 7 for Chivas. At the end of the Apertura 2020, it was announced that Sánchez was one of several players who would leave the club.

=== Tigres UANL ===
Sánchez signed with Tigres UANL for 2021 and helped the team win the Clausura 2021. After a loan to the Houston Dash for June, Sánchez returned for the Apertura 2020 in which UANL reached the final and lost in a shootout. The club posted a farewell video on 22 December, and Sánchez replied with gratitude for her to fulfill her "dreams."

=== Houston Dash ===
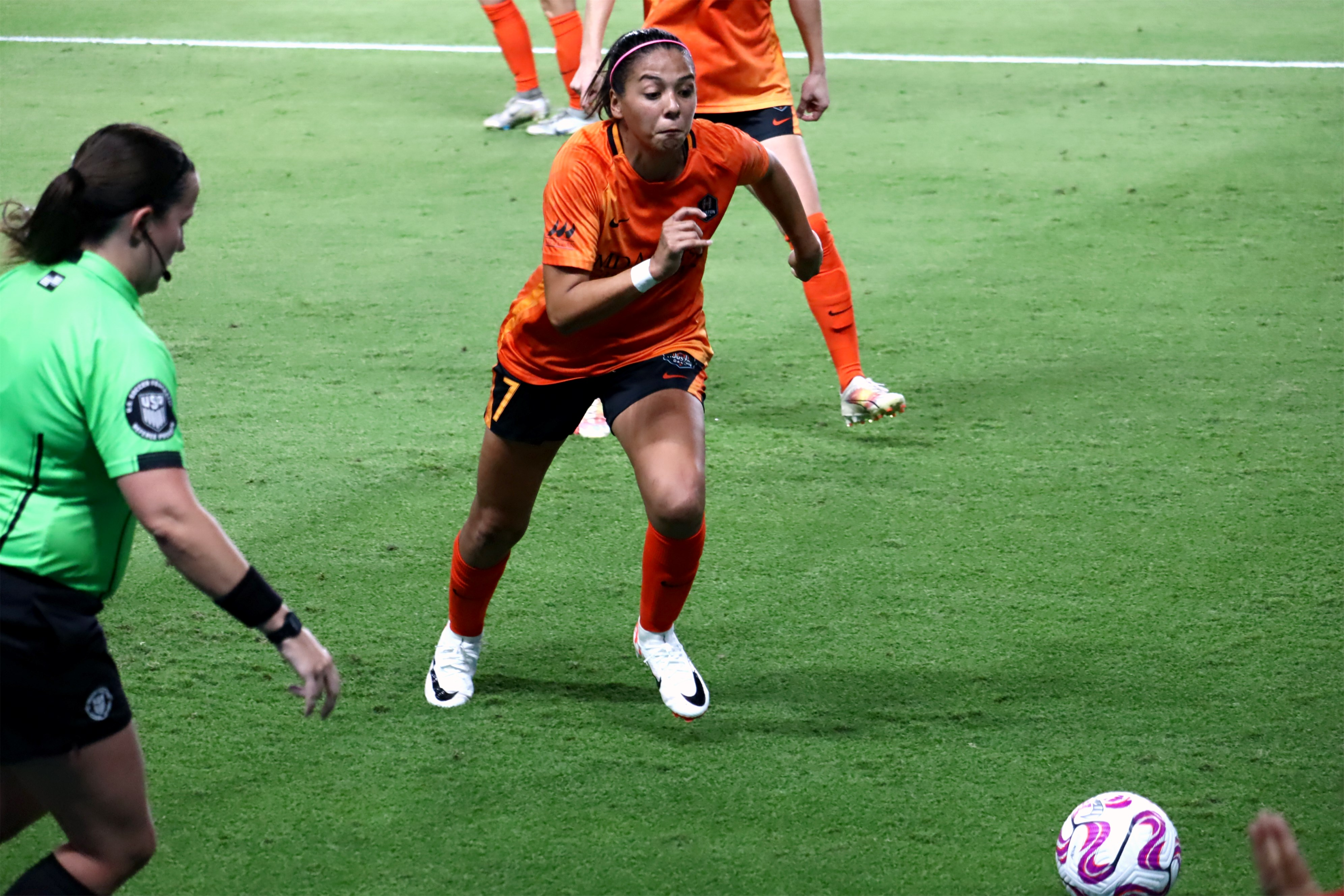
Sánchez playing for the Houston Dash in 2023

In March 2021, Houston Dash acquired Sánchez's NWSL rights from Chicago in exchange for Houston's second-round pick in the 2022 NWSL Draft. She signed for a month-long loan from Tigres in June 2021 and scored her first goal in the league in a 2–1 victory over the Orlando Pride. Although her loan ended, Houston retained her NWSL rights.

Before the 2022 NWSL Expansion Draft, the Dash released a list of nine protected players that included "a contracted international player who has not yet been announced." The NWSL released the same list but named Sánchez as that player, although her contract signing would not be officially announced until 2022. On 6 January 2022, the Dash announced that Sánchez had been signed to a two-year contract. "Joining the Dash is such a privilege for me," Sánchez said. "It's getting another shot at my dream, and I couldn't be more excited to do it with a team and coaching staff that I have tremendous respect for!" In December 2023, Sánchez signed a three-year contract with the Dash reportedly worth almost US$1.5 million, the richest contract in NWSL history.

=== San Diego Wave ===
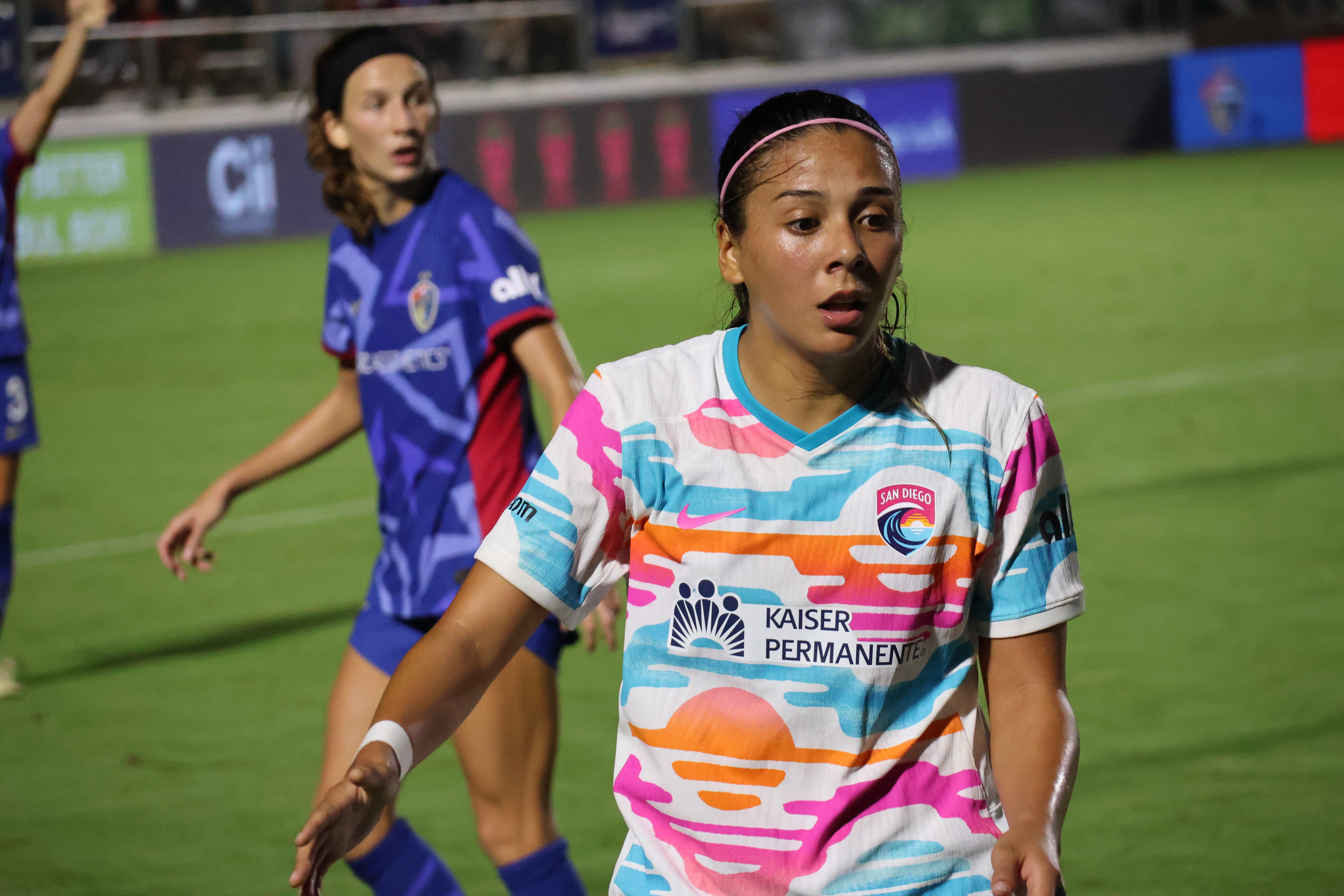
Sánchez playing for the San Diego Wave in 2024

The Dash went 1–2–1 to start the 2024 season. ESPN reported on 14 April 2024 that Sánchez wanted to be immediately traded from the Dash, which she confirmed on social media on 18 April. The Dash traded Sánchez to San Diego Wave FC on 20 April for $300,000 in intra-league transfer funds, $200,000 in allocation money, and an international slot for 2024 and 2025. Sánchez made her debut for the Wave one week later in a home victory over Bay FC. She scored her first goal with San Diego against the same opponent during an NWSL x Liga MX Femenil Summer Cup match in July, tallying an assist in the same match. On 18 September 2024, Sánchez scored a hat-trick against Portland Thorns FC in the CONCACAF W Champions Cup. Sánchez's three second-half goals lifted the Wave to a comeback victory after facing a two-goal deficit.

=== Return to Tigres UANL ===
On 23 June 2025, Sánchez returned to Tigres UANL for an undisclosed fee.

== International career ==
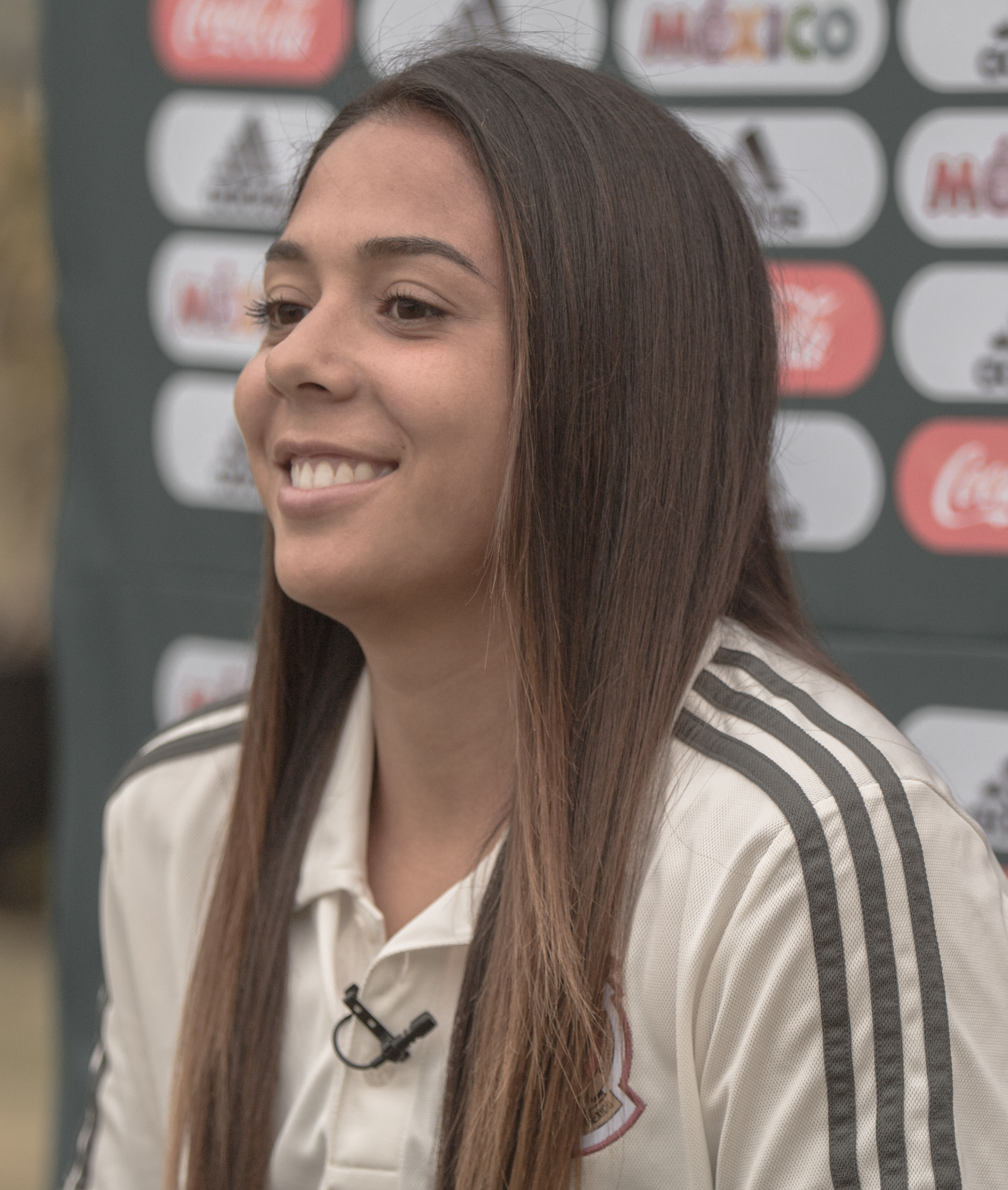
Sánchez in 2016

Sánchez was eligible to represent Mexico and the United States at the international level.

In 2015, Sánchez's coach at Idaho State told her about a tryout for the Mexico women's national under-20 football team. She made the team and, after good performances, was named to join the senior Mexico women's national football team for the 2015 FIFA Women's World Cup. She was the second youngest player on the World Cup team. Sánchez played as a midfielder in one match, a loss to England, in the World Cup.

Sánchez was selected to represent Mexico at the 2023 Pan American Games held in Santiago, Chile, where the Mexican squad went undefeated to won the gold medal for the first time in their history at the Pan American Games, defeating Chile 1–0.

== Personal life ==
In 2024, Sánchez appeared in the first season of The Offseason, a reality television series following a group of NWSL players training before the new season.

== Honours ==
Tigres UANL

- Liga MX Femenil: Guardianes 2021, Apertura 2025

Mexico

- Pan American Games: 2023, gold medal

== Career statistics ==
=== Club ===
As of 27 June 2025

Club	Season	League			Cup (Note: Includes the NWSL Challenge Cup)		Playoffs (Note: Includes NWSL Playoffs and Liga MX Femenil Liguilla phase)		Continental (Note: Includes CONCACAF W Champions Cup)		Other		Total	
Club	Season	Division	Apps	Goals	Apps	Goals	Apps	Goals	Apps	Goals	Apps	Goals	Apps	Goals
Chicago Red Stars	2019	NWSL	7	0	—		0	0	—		—		7	0
Guadalajara	2019–20	Liga MX Femenil	4	0	—		0	0	—		—		4	0
Guadalajara	2020–21	Liga MX Femenil	17	5	—		2	0	—		—		19	5
Guadalajara	Total		21	5	—		2	0	—		—		23	5
Tigres UANL	2020–21	Liga MX Femenil	17	3	—		6	0	—		—		23	3
Tigres UANL	2021–22	Liga MX Femenil	17	6	—		6	5	—		—		23	11
Tigres UANL	Total		34	9	—		12	5	—		—		46	14
Houston Dash	2021	NWSL	3	1	0	0	—		—		—		3	1
Houston Dash	2022	NWSL	20	2	6	1	1	0	—		—		27	3
Houston Dash	2023	NWSL	22	4	6	0	—		—		—		28	4
Houston Dash	2024	NWSL	4	0	—		—		—		—		4	0
Houston Dash	Total		49	7	12	1	1	0	—		—		62	8
San Diego Wave	2024	NWSL	22	1	0	0	—		4	4	3 (Note: Includes NWSL x Liga MX Femenil Summer Cup)	1	29	6
San Diego Wave	2025	NWSL	12	3	—		—		—		—		12	3
San Diego Wave	Total		34	4	0	0	0	0	4	4	3	1	41	9
Tigres UANL	2025	Liga MX Femenil	0	0	—		—		—		—		0	0
Career total			145	25	12	1	15	5	4	4	3	1	179	36

=== International goals ===
Scores and results list Mexico's goal tally first, score column indicates score after each Sánchez goal.

List of international goals scored by María Sánchez
No.	Date	Venue	Opponent	Score	Result	Competition
1	24 July 2018	Estadio Moderno Julio Torres, Barranquilla, Colombia	Nicaragua	1–0	4–0	2018 Central American and Caribbean Games
2	27 July 2018	Estadio Moderno Julio Torres, Barranquilla, Colombia	Venezuela	2–1	3–1	2018 Central American and Caribbean Games
3	7 October 2018	Sahlen's Stadium, Cary, North Carolina, U.S.	Trinidad and Tobago	4–1	4–1	2018 CONCACAF Women's Championship
4	21 September 2021	Estadio Azteca, Mexico City, Mexico	Colombia	1–0	2–0	Friendly
5	23 October 2021	Estadio Gregorio "Tepa" Gómez, Tepatitlán, Mexico	Argentina	4–1	6–1	Friendly
6	12 April 2022	Estadio Nemesio Díez, Toluca, Mexico	Puerto Rico	6–0	6–0	2022 CONCACAF W Championship qualification
7	25 June 2022	Estadio Corona, Torreón, Mexico	Peru	2–1	5–1	Friendly
8	22 September 2023	Estadio Azteca, Mexico City, Mexico	Puerto Rico	1–1	2–1	2024 CONCACAF W Gold Cup qualification
9	26 September 2023	Estadio Hidalgo, Pachuca, Mexico	Trinidad and Tobago	1–0	6–0	2024 CONCACAF W Gold Cup qualification
10	22 October 2023	Estadio Elías Figueroa Brander, Valparaíso, Chile	Jamaica	1–0	7–0	2023 Pan American Games
11	22 October 2023	Estadio Elías Figueroa Brander, Valparaíso, Chile	Jamaica	6–0	7–0	2023 Pan American Games
12	25 October 2023	Estadio Sausalito, Viña del Mar, Chile	Chile	2–1	3–1	2023 Pan American Games
13	28 October 2023	Estadio Sausalito, Viña del Mar, Chile	Paraguay	3–1	4–1	2023 Pan American Games
14	27 October 2025	Estadio Olímpico Benito Juárez, Ciudad Juárez, Mexico	New Zealand	2–0	2–0	Friendly
15	10 April 2026	Estadio Carlos Vega Villalba, Zacatecas, Mexico	U.S. Virgin Islands	1–0	9–0	2026 CONCACAF W Championship qualification
16	10 April 2026	Estadio Carlos Vega Villalba, Zacatecas, Mexico	U.S. Virgin Islands	3–0	9–0	2026 CONCACAF W Championship qualification
17	10 April 2026	Estadio Carlos Vega Villalba, Zacatecas, Mexico	U.S. Virgin Islands	6–0	9–0	2026 CONCACAF W Championship qualification
18	10 April 2026	Estadio Carlos Vega Villalba, Zacatecas, Mexico	U.S. Virgin Islands	8–0	9–0	2026 CONCACAF W Championship qualification
