= Makamae Gomera-Stevens =

American professional soccer player

Personal information
- Full name: Kapuamakamaemalamaonalani Rachel-May Gomera-Stevens
- Date of birth: March 17, 1999 (age 27)
- Place of birth: Kapolei, Hawaii, United States
- Height: 5 ft 5 in (1.65 m)
- Position: Midfielder

College career
Years	Team	Apps	(Gls)
2017–2021	Washington State Cougars	76	(13)

Senior career*
Years	Team	Apps	(Gls)
2021–2023	Houston Dash	16	(0)
- * Club domestic league appearances and goals as of July 8, 2022

Kapuamakamaemalamaonalani Rachel-May Gomera-Stevens (born March 17, 1999), known as Kapuamakamae or simply Makamae Gomera-Stevens, is an American former professional soccer player who played as a midfielder.

== Club career ==
Gomera-Stevens was selected by the Houston Dash in the third round of the 2021 NWSL Draft. After returning to Washington State to play the spring 2021 season, she was announced to have signed a two-year deal with Houston on May 21, 2021.

== Career statistics ==
Club	Season	League			Cup (Note: Includes the NWSL Challenge Cup)		Playoffs (Note: Includes NWSL Playoffs)		Total	
Club	Season	Division	Apps	Goals	Apps	Goals	Apps	Goals	Apps	Goals
Houston Dash	2021	NWSL	13	0	0	0	—		13	0
Houston Dash	2022	NWSL	3	0	6	0	0	0	9	0
Houston Dash	2023	NWSL	0	0	0	0	—		0	0
Career total			16	0	6	0	0	0	22	0
