= Michelle Alozie =

Nigerian footballer (born 1997)

Michelle Alozie OON
- Alozie with the Chicago Stars in 2026

Personal information
- Full name: Michelle Chinwendu Alozie
- Date of birth: 28 April 1997 (age 29)
- Place of birth: La Jolla, California, U.S.
- Height: 1.68 m (5 ft 6 in)
- Positions: Right-back; forward

Team information
- Current team: Chicago Stars
- Number: 5

Youth career
- 2011–2014: Legends FC
- 2011–2014: Granite Hills Cougars

College career
Years	Team	Apps	(Gls)
2015–2018	Yale Bulldogs	49	(19)
2019	Tennessee Volunteers	17	(3)

Senior career*
Years	Team	Apps	(Gls)
2020	BIIK Kazygurt		
2021–2025	Houston Dash	73	(6)
2026–	Chicago Stars	22	(0)

International career^{‡}
2021–	Nigeria	57	(4)
- * Club domestic league appearances and goals as of 05:34, 2 November 2026 (UTC) ‡ National team caps and goals as of 16 October 2026

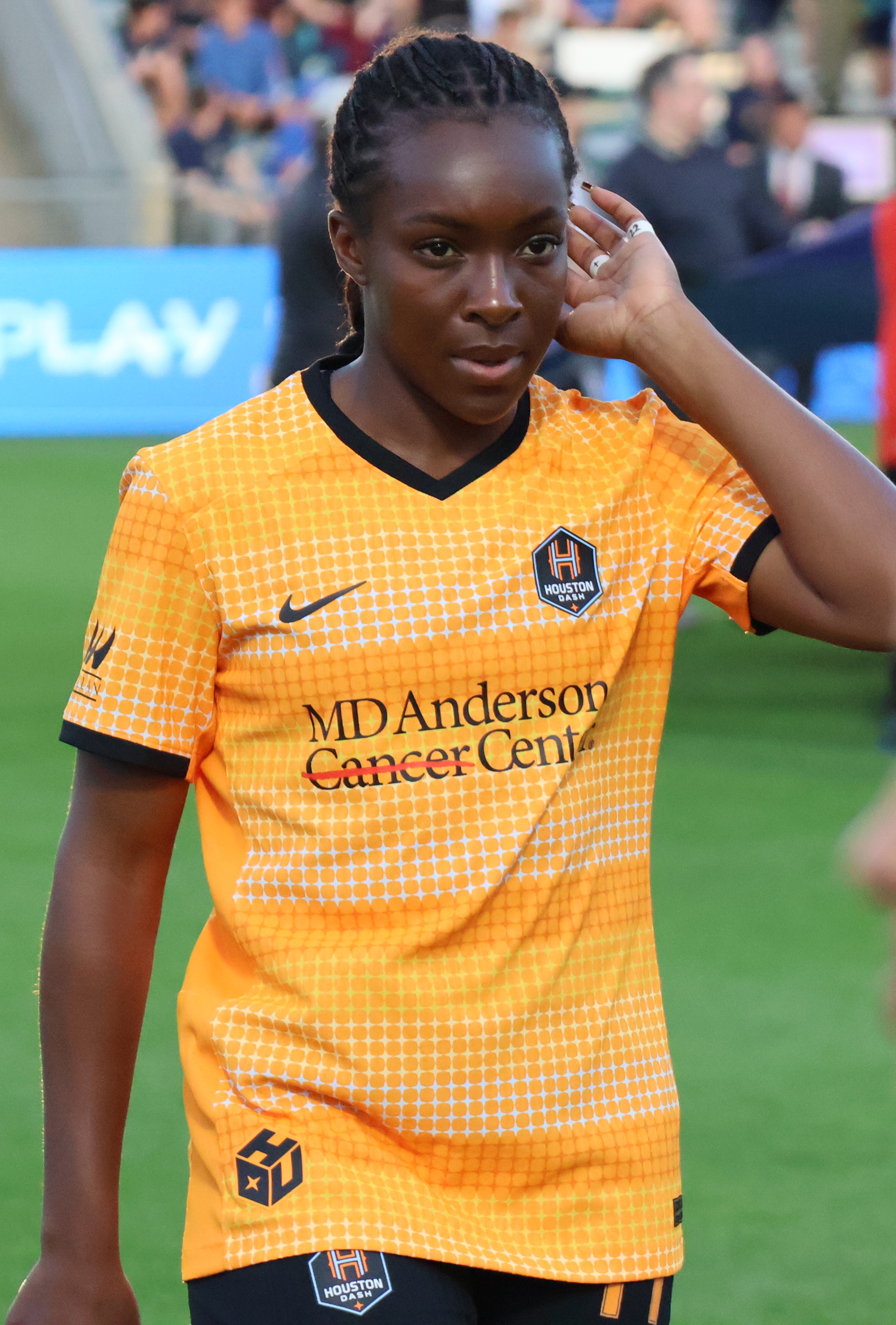
Alozie with the Houston Dash in 2024

Michelle Chinwendu Alozie OON (born 28 April 1997) is a professional footballer who plays as a right-back or forward for Chicago Stars FC of the National Women's Soccer League (NWSL). Born in the United States, she plays for the Nigeria national team.

== Early life ==
Alozie was born in La Jolla, California, to Nigerian parents from Imo State, Nigeria. She was raised in Apple Valley and attended the Granite Hills High School in her hometown.

== College career ==
Alozie attended Yale University and played soccer for the Yale Bulldogs from 2015 to 2018. She suffered a torn anterior cruciate ligament in her senior season. Alozie transferred as a graduate to the University of Tennessee to continue playing for the Tennessee Volunteers.

== Club career ==
=== BIIK Kazygurt ===
Alozie registered for the 2019 National Women's Soccer League (NWSL) College Draft but was not selected. Instead, in January 2020, she signed her first professional contract with BIIK Kazygurt, the defending champions of the Kazakhstani women's football championship. She trained with the team for three months before COVID-19 ended the season, and she returned to California.

=== Houston Dash ===
Alozie joined the Houston Dash, where Alozie's childhood friend Ally Prisock was playing, as a preseason trialist without a contract in 2021. Dash assistant Twila Kilgore had previously recruited Alozie when Kilgore was head coach of the Pepperdine Waves. Alozie signed a national team replacement contract during the 2021 Houston Dash season, then signed a full contract for the remainder of the season in August 2021. In the 2022 season, Alozie made her first postseason start in the Dash's NWSL Playoffs appearance.

In December 2022, Alozie signed a two-year contract extension with the Dash. She went on to play for Houston through the end of the 2025 season, making a total of 80 appearances (37 starts) across all competitions for the Dash.

=== Chicago Stars ===
On 23 December 2025, the Dash announced that they had traded Alozie to the Chicago Stars in exchange for $40,000 in NWSL allocation money. The Stars subsequently signed Alozie to a three-year contract through 2028.

== International career ==
Alozie made her international debut for Nigeria on 10 June 2021 as a 65th-minute substitution in a 0–1 friendly loss to Jamaica. The game was part of the 2021 US Summer Series taking place in Houston where Alozie was training with the Dash. She was named to Nigeria's roster by national team manager Randy Waldrum after one training session with the team the day prior. In Nigeria's second game of the series against Portugal, Alozie scored her first goal for Nigeria in an enthralling 3-3 draw.

On 16 June 2023, Alozie was named to the 23-player Nigerian squad for the 2023 FIFA Women's World Cup. She played every minute of the tournament for the Super Falcons with Nigeria eventually losing to England on penalties after a 0–0 draw in the Round of 16. In the 87th minute of that game, Alozie was involved in an infamous incident that went viral. She had successfully won the ball off England forward Lauren James but was fouled and stamped on by James, who was subsequently sent off for violent conduct after a VAR intervention, receiving a two-game ban.

In December 2023, Alozie was named to the CAF Women's Africa Best XI as one of the world's best African players.

Alozie was called up to the Nigeria squad for the 2024 Summer Olympics.

She was part of the Nigerian women national team squad that won the 2025 Women's Africa Cup of Nations and was awarded the national honour Officer of the Order of the Niger, one hundred thousand dollars and a three-bedroom apartments at the renewed hope estate in Abuja

== Off-field medical career ==
Alozie obtained a Bachelors Degree in Molecular Biology from Yale University. She works part-time as a cancer research technician at the Texas Children's Hospital in Houston, Texas.

== Personal life ==
In 2024, Alozie appeared in the first season of The Offseason, a reality television series following a group of NWSL players training before the new season.

List of International Goals by Michelle Alozie
No.	Date	Venue	Opponent	Score	Result	Competition
1	13 June 2021	Shell Energy Stadium, Houston, Texas	Portugal	1−2	3−3	Friendly
2	22 July 2025	Larbi Zaouli Stadium, Casablanca, Morocco	South Africa	2−1	2−1	2024 Women's Africa Cup of Nations
3	3 March 2026	Military Stadium, Yaounde, Cameroon	Cameroon	3−1	3−1	Friendly
4	9 October 2026	Remo Stars Stadium, Ikenne, Nigeria	Comoros	1−0	2−0	2028 CAF Women's Olympic qualifying tournament

== Honours ==
Nigeria

- Women's Africa Cup of Nations: 2024

Individual

- Women's Africa Cup of Nations Team of the Tournament: 2024
- CAF Team of the Year Women's XI: 2023, 2024

Orders

- Officer of the Order of the Niger
