= Sarah Lowdon =

English football manager

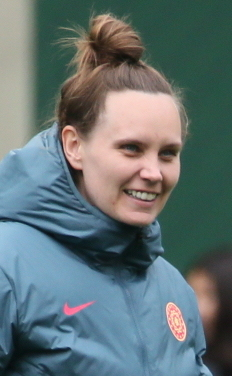
- Lowdon with the Portland Thorns in 2024

Personal information
- Place of birth: Gateshead, England

Team information
- Current team: Portland Thorns (first assistant)

Managerial career
- Years: Team
- 2023: Houston Dash
- 2025–2026: Portland Thorns (interim Head Coach)
- 2024–: Portland Thorns (first assistant)

Sarah Lowdon is an English football manager who is an assistant coach of Portland Thorns FC of the National Women's Soccer League (NWSL).

== Early life ==
Lowdon started playing football at the age of six.

== Career ==
Lowdon managed American side Houston Dash, where she was described as "placed a heavy emphasis on team defense".

Lowdon was hired as an assistant coach by the Portland Thorns before the 2024 season. After Rob Gale was fired prior to the 2026 season, Lowdon was instated as the club's interim head coach..

== Personal life ==
Lowdon is a native of Newcastle upon Tyne, England.
