= Kelcie Hedge =

American soccer player (born 1997)

Personal information
- Full name: Kelcie Lee Anne Hedge
- Date of birth: September 19, 1997 (age 29)
- Height: 5 ft 7 in (1.70 m)
- Position: Midfielder

Youth career
- Washington Premier FC

College career
Years	Team	Apps	(Gls)
2015–2016	Washington Huskies	21	(4)
2017–2019	Santa Clara Broncos	64	(13)

Senior career*
Years	Team	Apps	(Gls)
2020–2021	OL Reign	1	(0)
2022–2023	Houston Dash	4	(0)

International career
- United States U17
2016	United States U20	3	(1)
2019	United States U23	2	(0)
- * Club domestic league appearances and goals as of 22:42, March 27, 2023 (UTC)

Kelcie Lee Anne Hedge (born September 19, 1997) is an American former professional soccer player who played as a midfielder. She played for the OL Reign and Houston Dash of the National Women's Soccer League (NWSL).

== Club career ==
OL Reign selected Hedge with the ninth overall pick in the 2020 NWSL College Draft, and she signed a three-year contract with the team on March 6, 2020. However, Hedge suffered an ACL injury on July 1 and subsequently missed the entire season. Hedge made her professional debut on July 18, 2021.

Hedge was traded to the Houston Dash in December 2021. Her contract with the Dash was mutually terminated in June 2023.

== International career ==
Hedge is a United States youth international and played at the 2016 FIFA U-20 Women's World Cup.
