= Ally Prisock =

American soccer player (born 1997)

Personal information
- Full name: Ally Samantha Prisock
- Date of birth: January 18, 1997 (age 29)
- Place of birth: Fontana, California, United States
- Height: 5 ft 8 in (1.73 m)
- Position: Defender

Youth career
- 2011–2014: Rancho Cucamonga High School
- 2018: SoCal FC
- Legends FC
- Arsenal FC

College career
Years	Team	Apps	(Gls)
2015–2018	USC Trojans	90	(1)

Senior career*
Years	Team	Apps	(Gls)
2019–2023	Houston Dash	52	(1)
2021–2022	→ Issy (loan)	18	(0)

International career^{‡}
2016	United States U-19	3	(1)
- * Club domestic league appearances and goals as of 15:29, October 16, 2023 (UTC) ‡ National team caps and goals as of April 23, 2019

Ally Samantha Prisock (born January 18, 1997) is an American former professional soccer player who played as a defender. She played college soccer for the USC Trojans, earning first-team All-American honors in 2018, before being selected in the second round of the 2019 NWSL College Draft by the Houston Dash. She spent five years playing professionally with the Dash, including a stint on loan with French club GPSO 92 Issy.

== Early years ==
Prisock was born to Aaron Prisock and Nickie Jennings and grew up in Fontana, California alongside sisters Ashley and Alyssa. She attended Rancho Cucamonga High School and after committing to USC her junior year she took summer classes in order to graduated early from high school, December of her senior year, in order to be able to attend spring training at USC.

== College career ==
Prisock played four years for the University of Southern California Trojans, including their 2016 NCAA Tournament Championship year. During her time at USC she made 90 appearances, starting in every game of her college career. She set appearance records for most appearances by a Trojan player and became one of only three players in program history to start every game in their freshman year. During her time at USC she was known for her dedication and commitment to training every day. She also helped lead the Trojans to four consecutive NCAA tournament appearances, finishing her career being named a first-team All-American and a semifinalist for the MAC Hermann Trophy.

== Club career ==
Prisock entered the 2019 NWSL College Draft and was selected in the second round with the 12th overall pick by the Houston Dash. She attended the Dash's 2019 preseason and started in their preseason game against Texas A&M. Prisock was signed by the Dash in April 2019. She made her regular season debut on June 15, 2019.

Her contract with the Dash was mutually terminated in February 2024.

== International career ==
Prisock was first called up to United States national team camps at the U-14 NDP, U-15 GNT and U-17 WNT level. She made her debut for the United States with the U-19 national team against the New Zealand WNT. On her second appearance, this time against the New Zealand U-20 WNT, Prisock scored a goal.

== Career statistics ==
=== Club ===
Club	Season	League			Cup (Note: Includes the NWSL Challenge Cup and Coupe de France féminine)		Playoffs (Note: Includes NWSL Playoffs)		Other		Total	
Club	Season	Division	Apps	Goals	Apps	Goals	Apps	Goals	Apps	Goals	Apps	Goals
SoCal FC	2018	WPSL	2	0	—		—		—		2	0
Houston Dash	2019	NWSL	15	0	—		—		—		15	0
Houston Dash	2020	NWSL	—		5	0	—		4 (Note: Includes the NWSL Fall Series)	0	9	0
Houston Dash	2021	NWSL	6	0	3	0	—		—		9	0
Houston Dash	2022	NWSL	22	0	3	1	1	0	—		26	1
Houston Dash	2023	NWSL	9	1	4	0	—		—		13	1
Issy (loan)	2021–22	D1F	18	0	0	0	—		—		18	0
Career total			72	1	15	1	1	0	4	0	92	2

== Honors ==
USC Trojans

- NCAA Division I Women's Soccer Championship: 2016

Houston Dash

- NWSL Challenge Cup: 2020
