= Allysha Chapman =

Canadian professional soccer player

- Chapman with the Houston Dash in 2026

Personal information
- Full name: Allysha Lyn Chapman
- Date of birth: January 25, 1989 (age 37)
- Place of birth: Oshawa, Ontario, Canada
- Height: 1.60 m (5 ft 3 in)
- Position: Left-back

Team information
- Current team: Houston Dash
- Number: 2

College career
Years	Team	Apps	(Gls)
2007	UAB Blazers	18	(0)
2009–2011	LSU Tigers	67	(1)

Senior career*
Years	Team	Apps	(Gls)
2006–2010	Toronto Lady Lynx	43	(4)
2008	Vancouver Whitecaps FC	2	(0)
2012–2013	IK Sirius FK	39	(2)
2014	Eskilstuna United DFF	19	(3)
2015–2016	Houston Dash	14	(0)
2017	Boston Breakers	19	(0)
2018	North Carolina Courage	1	(0)
2018–	Houston Dash	123	(0)

International career^{‡}
2008	Canada U-20	8	(0)
2014–2026	Canada	100	(2)
Medal record
Women's football
Representing Canada
CONCACAF W Championship
Runner-up	2018
Olympic Games
Gold medal – first place	2020	Team
Bronze medal – third place	2016	Team
- * Club domestic league appearances and goals as of 03:12, November 8, 2026 (UTC) ‡ National team caps and goals as of October 12, 2026

Allysha Lyn Chapman (born January 25, 1989) is a Canadian professional soccer player who plays as a left-back for National Women's Soccer League club Houston Dash and the Canada national team.

== Club career ==
After graduating from Courtice Secondary School, Chapman played college soccer for UAB in 2007 and for LSU from 2009 to 2011. Chapman joined the Dash in 2015 after playing the previous three seasons in Sweden. After two seasons in Houston, she was traded to the Boston Breakers on November 28, 2016.

Chapman appeared in 19 games in what would be her only season in Boston, as the team would fold ahead of the 2018 season.

Chapman was selected by the Courage with the 10th pick in the 2018 Dispersal Draft. After seeing very minimal playing time with the Courage, she was traded to the Houston Dash on May 9.

Chapman made her return to the Dash on May 15, 2018, against the Chicago Red Stars. Chapman was part of the team which won the 2020 NWSL Challenge Cup. Upon the announcement of her contract extension in October 2022, the club's General Manager Alex Singer said of Chapman "She is the definition of grit and determination and embodies everything this club stands for. We are elated she chose to stay with the club". On December 10, 2024, Chapman signed a contract extension with the dash that runs through the 2026 season, with the mutual option for a further one-year extension. On September 14, 2025, she made her 100th league appearance for the Dash, becoming the fifth player to reach a century of league appearances for the club.

== International career ==
Chapman was part of the Canada national under-20 team that won the 2008 CONCACAF Women's U-20 Championship.

Chapman was called up to a senior national team camp in early 2009, at the time where the team was transitioning coaches from Even Pellerud to Carolina Morace, but her first cap at the senior level would not come for over five more years.

She made her debut for the Canada national team on October 25, 2014 in Edmonton, a 3-0 loss against Japan. Chapman's performance was described as "one of the few bright spots for" the Canadian side. After her debut, Chapman said that she had previously considered representing Scotland as she held a British passport and qualified through her mother.

Chapman scored her first goal for Canada against Italy at the 2015 Cyprus Women's Cup, helping the team to a 1-0 victory and taking the team to the final. Later that year, Chapman was named to Canada's roster for the 2015 FIFA Women's World Cup. She played every minute of Canada's five matches. Canada was eliminated by England in the quarterfinals.

Chapman was named to Canada's roster for the 2016 CONCACAF Olympic Qualifier, where Canada finished second and qualified for the 2016 Summer Olympics. She won the 2016 Algarve Cup and was named to Canada's Olympic Team. Chapman played in five of Canada's six games at the Olympic Games, winning the Bronze Medal.

On May 25, 2019, she was named to the roster for the 2019 FIFA Women's World Cup.

Chapman was named to the roster for Canada's 2020 Olympic Team. Chapman played in four of Canada's six games at the Olympic Games, winning the Gold Medal.

In August 2023, during the 2023 FIFA Women's World Cup against Australia, a live microphone picked up an exchange between Chapman and Matildas coach Tony Gustavsson after Chapman collided with Australian forward Hayley Raso. Chapman said: "She fucking jumped into me, you twat." BBC sports commentator Robyn Cowen quickly apologized to viewers, saying, "Apologies there if any language was picked up on the very sensitive pitch-side microphones it seems."

== Career statistics ==
=== College ===
Club	Season	Apps	Goals
UAB	2007	18	0
LSU	2009	24	0
LSU	2010	21	0
LSU	2011	22	1
Career totals		85	1

=== Club ===
As of August 4, 2026

Club	Season	League			League Cup (Note: Includes NWSL Challenge Cup)		National Cup (Note: Includes Svenska cupen)		Other		Total	
Club	Season	League	Apps	Goals	Apps	Goals	Apps	Goals	Apps	Goals	Apps	Goals
IK Sirius FK	2012	Norrettan	22	1	—		1	0	—		23	1
IK Sirius FK	2013	Elitettan	17	1	—		1	0	—		18	1
Eskilstuna United DFF	2014	Damallsvenskan	19	3	—		1	0	—		20	3
Houston Dash	2015	NWSL	5	0	—		—		—		5	0
Houston Dash	2016	NWSL	9	0	—		—		—		9	0
Boston Breakers	2017	NWSL	19	0	—		—		—		19	0
North Carolina Courage	2018	NWSL	1	0	—		—		—		1	0
Houston Dash	2018	NWSL	15	0	—		—		—		15	0
Houston Dash	2019	NWSL	14	0	—		—		—		14	0
Houston Dash	2020	NWSL	0	0	—		—		9 (Note: Includes 2020 Fall Series)	0	9	0
Houston Dash	2021	NWSL	16	0	2	0	—		0	0	18	0
Houston Dash	2022	NWSL	14	0	6	0	—		0	0	20	0
Houston Dash	2023	NWSL	12	0	2	0	—		0	0	14	0
Houston Dash	2024	NWSL	8	0	0	0	—		0	0	8	0
Houston Dash	2025	NWSL	11	0	0	0	—		0	0	11	0
Houston Dash	2026	NWSL	11	0	0	0	—		0	0	11	0
Houston Dash	Total		101	0	10	0	0	0	9	0	119	0
Career totals			193	5	10	0	3	0	9	0	215	5

=== International ===
As of October 12, 2026

Canada
Year	Apps	Goals
2014	3	0
2015	18	1
2016	18	0
2017	8	0
2018	10	0
2019	12	0
2020	6	0
2021	11	0
2022	7	1
2023	6	0
2024	0	0
2025	0	0
2026	1	0
Total	100	2

=== International goals ===
Scores and results list Canada's goal tally first.

#	Date	Venue	Opponent	Score	Result	Competition
1.	March 9, 2015	Nicosia, Cyprus	Italy	1–0	1–0	2015 Cyprus Women's Cup
2.	July 14, 2022	San Nicolas de los Garza, Mexico	Jamaica	2-0	3-0	2022 CONCACAF W Championship

== Honours ==
Houston Dash

- NWSL Challenge Cup: 2020

Canada U20

- CONCACAF Women's U-20 Championship: 2008

Canada

- Summer Olympics: 2021; bronze medal: 2016
- CONCACAF Women's Olympic Qualifier runner-up: 2016
- Algarve Cup: 2016; runner-up 2017
