= Diana Ordóñez =

Mexican footballer (born 2001)

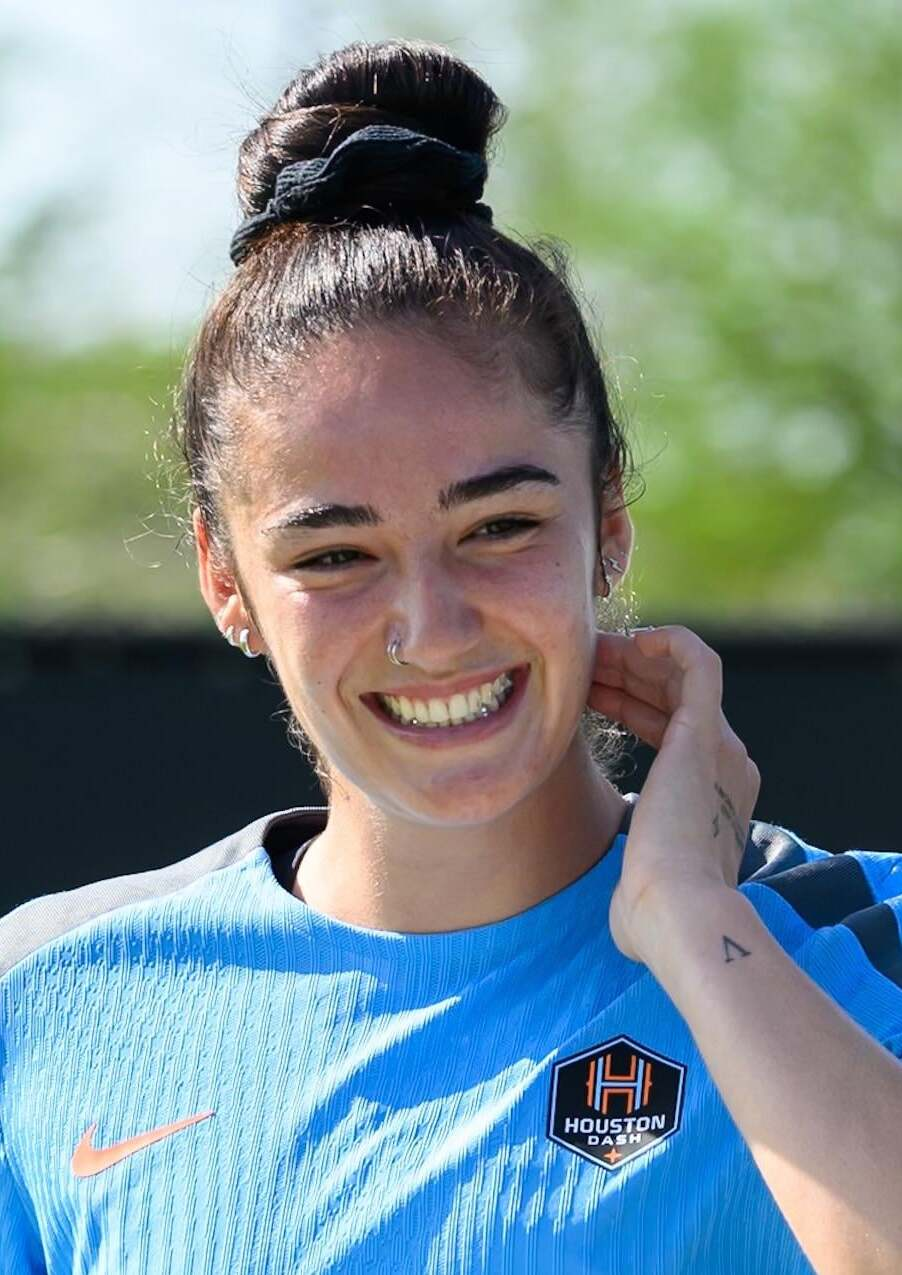
- Ordóñez with the Houston Dash in 2025

Personal information
- Full name: Diana Rosario Ordóñez Torres
- Date of birth: 26 September 2001 (age 25)
- Place of birth: Riverside, California, U.S.
- Height: 1.80 m (5 ft 11 in)
- Position: Forward

Team information
- Current team: UANL
- Number: 12

Youth career
- 2010–2019: FC Dallas Girls

College career
Years	Team	Apps	(Gls)
2019–2021	Virginia Cavaliers	62	(45)

Senior career*
Years	Team	Apps	(Gls)
2022	North Carolina Courage	19	(11)
2023–2025	Houston Dash	47	(8)
2025–	UANL	26	(24)

International career^{‡}
2017–2018	United States U17	7	(4)
2019	United States U20	2	(0)
2020	United States U19	3	(1)
2022–	Mexico	40	(16)
Medal record
Women's football
Representing Mexico
Pan American Games
Gold medal – first place	2023 Santiago	Team
- * Club domestic league appearances and goals as of 6:41, 2 September 2025 (UTC) ‡ National team caps and goals as of 9 June 2026

Diana Rosario Ordóñez Torres (born 26 September 2001) is a professional footballer who plays as a forward for Liga MX Femenil club Tigres UANL. Born in the United States, she plays for the Mexico national team. Ordóñez played college soccer for the Virginia Cavaliers, being named first-team All-American in 2021. She was drafted sixth overall by the North Carolina Courage in the 2022 NWSL Draft and broke the league's rookie scoring record in her first season.

== Early life ==
Ordóñez was born in Riverside, California, United States, to an Ecuadorian father and an American mother of Mexican descent. She was the youngest of five children. While still a small child, the family moved to Frisco, Texas, a suburb of Dallas. She played soccer for the FC Dallas youth team from 2010 to 2019, winning the Elite Clubs National League U-16 championship in 2017. Ordóñez played for Prosper High School, where she was named the Gatorade Texas Girls Soccer Player of the Year in 2017.

== College career ==
Ordóñez initially committed to play college soccer at Texas A&M University, but was urged instead to play at the University of Virginia by a friend, fellow soccer player Taryn Torres. She finished high school a semester early and enrolled at Virginia in January 2019, barely 17 years old. During her Virginia career (2019–2021) she scored 45 goals, tied for third most all time at the university, although she only played three years of her four-year eligibility. In 2021 she was a first-team All-American and a semifinalist for the MAC Hermann Trophy.

== Club career ==
On 18 December 2021, the North Carolina Courage selected Ordóñez sixth overall in the 2022 National Women's Soccer League Draft. Ordóñez made her first appearance for the Courage in the 2022 NWSL Challenge Cup on 19 March and scored her first goal on 4 May. On 13 August, Ordóñez eighth goal broke the NWSL record for goals scored in a rookie season. She came second in voting for NWSL Rookie of the Year.

Following the 2022 season, on January 12, 2023, Ordóñez was traded to the Houston Dash along with a third-round 2023 NWSL Draft pick for a first-round pick and $100,000 in allocation funds.

On 30 May 2025, the Houston Dash announced that they had transferred Ordóñez to Tigres UANL for an undisclosed fee. Ordóñez scored 14 goals in her first season at Tigres, and later won her first trophy with the club as part of the Apertura 2025 championship team. In the second leg of the final against Club America, Ordóñez scored the decisive goal in a game that ended 1–0.

== International career ==
Ordóñez made her senior debut for Mexico women's national team on 9 April 2022.

Ordóñez was selected to represent Mexico at the 2023 Pan American Games held in Santiago, Chile, where the Mexican squad went undefeated to win the gold medal for the first time in their history at the Pan American Games, defeating Chile 1–0.

== Career statistics ==
=== International goals ===
No.	Date	Venue	Opponent	Score	Result	Competition
1.	9 April 2022	Raymond E. Guishard Technical Centre, The Valley, Anguilla	Anguilla	7–0	11–0	2022 CONCACAF W Championship qualification
2.	9 April 2022	Raymond E. Guishard Technical Centre, The Valley, Anguilla	Anguilla	9–0	11–0	2022 CONCACAF W Championship qualification
3.	12 April 2022	Estadio Nemesio Díez, Toluca, Mexico	Puerto Rico	5–0	6–0	2022 CONCACAF W Championship qualification
4.	28 June 2022	Cancha de Entrenamiento TSM, Torreón, Mexico	Peru	2–0	3–0	Friendly
5.	10 October 2022	Cancha Centenario No. 5, Mexico City, Mexico	Chile	1–1	1–1	Friendly
6.	22 October 2023	Estadio Elías Figueroa Brander, Valparaíso, Chile	Jamaica	4–0	7–0	2023 Pan American Games
7.	25 October 2023	Estadio Sausalito, Viña del Mar, Chile	Chile	3–1	3–1	2023 Pan American Games
8.	28 October 2023	Estadio Sausalito, Viña del Mar, Chile	Paraguay	2–1	4–1	2023 Pan American Games
9.	23 February 2024	Dignity Health Sports Park, Carson, United States	Dominican Republic	6–0	8–0	2024 CONCACAF W Gold Cup
10.	3 June 2025	Estadio Tlahuicole, Tlaxcala City, Mexico	Uruguay	1–0	1–0	Friendly
11.	2 July 2025	Estadio Agustín "Coruco" Díaz, Zacatepec, Mexico	Colombia	1–0	1–0	Friendly
12.	27 October 2025	Estadio Olímpico Benito Juárez, Ciudad Juárez, Mexico	New Zealand	1–0	2–0	Friendly
13.	2 December 2025	Complejo Deportivo FCRF-Plycem, San José, Costa Rica	Costa Rica	2–0	2–0	Friendly
14.	2 March 2026	Daren Sammy Cricket Ground, Gros Islet, Saint Lucia	Saint Lucia	7–0	7–0	2026 CONCACAF W Championship qualification
15.	6 June 2026	McDonald Jones Stadium, Newcastle, Australia	Australia	1–0	1–0	Friendly
16.	9 June 2026	CommBank Stadium, Sydney, Australia	Australia	1–1	1–3	Friendly
