= List of Houston Dash players =

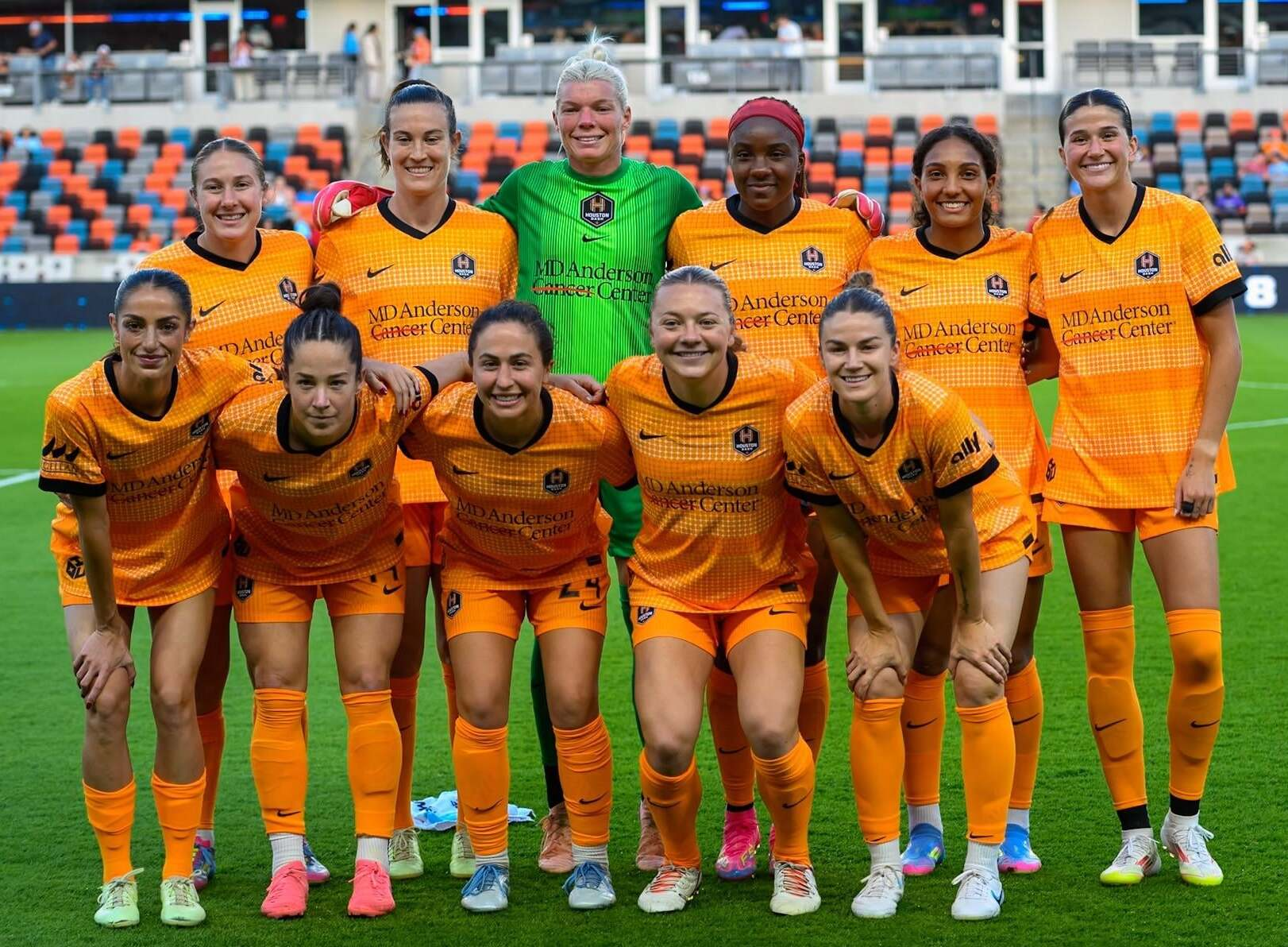
Houston Dash lineup, week 6 of 2025: Sheehan, Lind, Campbell, Bright, Ryan, Graham Gareis, Nielsen, Colaprico, Patterson, Westphal

The Houston Dash is an American professional women's soccer club which began play in the National Women's Soccer League (NWSL) in 2014 as an expansion team. All players who have made at least one competitive appearance for the Houston Dash are listed below.

== Key ==
- The list is ordered alphabetically.
- Appearances as a substitute are included.
- Statistics are correct as of November 1, 2026, the end of the 2026 NWSL season, and are updated once a year after the conclusion of the NWSL season.
- Players whose names are highlighted in **bold** were active players on the Houston Dash roster as of the list's most recent update.

Positions key
GK	Goalkeeper
DF	Defender
MF	Midfielder
FW	Forward

Nationality
Unless otherwise noted, the nationality of a player is determined by the country they most recently represented in international play, or if said player has not played international football then by their country of birth.
Position
Playing positions are listed according to the player's roster designation as of the list's most recent update.
Years
Years are defined as the first and last calendar years in which the player was rostered for the club in any of the competitions listed below.
Appearances and goals
This list counts appearances and goals in the National Women's Soccer League, NWSL Playoffs, NWSL Challenge Cup, NWSL Fall Series, and NWSL x Liga MX Femenil Summer Cup.

== Players ==
Yrs	No.	Pos	Nat	Player	Total		NWSL		Playoffs		Cup		Other	
Yrs	No.	Pos	Nat	Player	Apps	Goals	Apps	Goals	Apps	Goals	Apps	Goals	Apps	Goals
2021–2022	34	FW	(Cameroon) CMR	Michaela Abam	23	1	19	1	0	0	4	0	0	0
2018–2019	20	FW	(Canada) CAN	Lindsay Agnew	19	0	19	0	0	0	0	0	0	0
2021–	35, 22, 11	FW	(Nigeria) NGR	Michelle Alozie	80	7	75	7	1	0	4	0	0	0
2023–2024	99	GK	(Mexico) MEX	Emily Alvarado	2	0	0	0	0	0	2	0	0	0
2023–2024	77, 10	MF	(Brazil) BRA	Andressa Alves	31	3	29	2	0	0	0	0	2	1
2022–2023	29	FW	(United States) USA	Joelle Anderson	30	2	26	2	0	0	4	0	0	0
2015–2017	2, 17	MF	(Brazil) BRA	Andressinha	43	3	43	3	0	0	0	0	0	0
2020–2021	26	FW	(United States) USA	Bridgette Andrzejewski	1	0	0	0	0	0	0	0	1	0
2022	12	DF	(United States) USA	Julia Ashley	8	0	5	0	0	0	3	0	0	0
2015	26	DF	(United States) USA	Jazmyne Avant	2	0	2	0	0	0	0	0	0	0
2015	40	MF	(England) ENG	Rachael Axon	15	1	15	1	0	0	0	0	0	0
2024	26	DF	(United States) USA	Madison Ayson	3	0	1	0	0	0	0	0	2	0
2024–2025	28	FW	(Switzerland) SUI	Ramona Bachmann	14	2	14	2	0	0	0	0	0	0
2015	3	FW	(United States) USA	Allie Bailey	7	1	7	1	0	0	0	0	0	0
2016–2017	11, 16	FW	(Canada) CAN	Janine Beckie	38	5	38	5	0	0	0	0	0	0
2017	4	DF	(Brazil) BRA	Bruna Benites	14	0	14	0	0	0	0	0	0	0
2025–	10	DF	(United States) USA	Malia Berkely	23	1	23	1	0	0	0	0	0	0
2021	21	DF	(Jamaica) JAM	Deneisha Blackwood	2	0	1	0	0	0	1	0	0	0
2025–	27	DF	(Italy) ITA	Lisa Boattin	30	1	30	1	0	0	0	0	0	0
2014–2015	11	MF	(United States) USA	Brittany Bock (Note: Bock was the first-ever player to join the Houston Dash, drafted first overall in the 2014 NWSL expansion draft on January 10, 2014.)	5	0	5	0	0	0	0	0	0	0
2019	27	MF	(United States) USA	Betsy Brandon	1	0	1	0	0	0	0	0	0	0
2015–2017	6	MF	(United States) USA	Morgan Brian	33	0	33	0	0	0	0	0	0	0
2024–2025	19	MF	(United States) USA	Belle Briede	19	0	17	0	0	0	0	0	2	0
2025–	6	FW	(United States) USA	Messiah Bright	37	3	37	3	0	0	0	0	0	0
2016–2019	12, 22	DF	(United States) USA	Amber Brooks	91	4	91	4	0	0	0	0	0	0
2015–2016	24	DF	(Australia) AUS	Ellie Brush	30	1	30	1	0	0	0	0	0	0
2014	19	FW	(Austria) AUT	Nina Burger	17	4	17	4	0	0	0	0	0	0
2019	25	FW	(Mexico) MEX	Ariana Calderón	8	0	8	0	0	0	0	0	0	0
2015	9	DF	(Brazil) BRA	Camila	12	0	12	0	0	0	0	0	0	0
2017–	24, 1	GK	(United States) USA	Jane Campbell	221	0	197	0	1	0	19	0	4	0
2015–2016, 2018–	15, 4, 2	DF	(Canada) CAN	Allysha Chapman	144	0	123	0	0	0	16	0	5	0
2025–	24	MF	(United States) USA	Danielle Colaprico	54	2	54	2	0	0	0	0	0	0
2018–2019	21	MF	(United States) USA	Taylor Comeau	13	0	13	0	0	0	0	0	0	0
2017	11	DF	(United States) USA	Meghan Cox	1	0	1	0	0	0	0	0	0	0
2015	19	DF	(United States) USA	Niki Cross	15	0	15	0	0	0	0	0	0	0
2016	25	MF	(United States) USA	Megan Crosson	4	0	4	0	0	0	0	0	0	0
2021–2023	18	MF	(United States) USA	Emily Curran	27	0	25	0	0	0	2	0	0	0
2021	23	DF	(United States) USA	Abby Dahlkemper	8	0	8	0	0	0	0	0	0	0
2016–2022	3	FW	(England) ENG	Rachel Daly	116	42	101	37	0	0	15	5	0	0
2026–	40	GK	(United States) USA	Caroline DeLisle	2	0	2	0	0	0	0	0	0	0
2020–2021	99, 33	GK	(United States) USA	Amanda Dennis	1	0	1	0	0	0	0	0	0	0
2023–2024	31	DF	(United States) USA	Madelyn Desiano	8	1	4	0	0	0	4	1	0	0
2021–2022	16	FW	(United States) USA	Hannah Diaz	2	0	2	0	0	0	0	0	0	0
2014	23	DF	(United States) USA	Marissa Diggs	13	1	13	1	0	0	0	0	0	0
2025–	7	MF	(Sweden) SWE	Evelina Duljan	14	1	14	1	0	0	0	0	0	0
2022–2023	5, 3	DF	(United States) USA	Caprice Dydasco	33	0	27	0	1	0	5	0	0	0
2022	19	FW	(United States) USA	Elizabeth Eddy	19	2	13	2	1	0	5	0	0	0
2014	14	MF	(United States) USA	Becky Edwards	23	0	23	0	0	0	0	0	0	0
2026	11	MF	(Bosnia and Herzegovina) BIH	Emina Ekić	5	0	5	0	0	0	0	0	0	0
2014	13	FW	(United States) USA	Lindsay Elston	5	0	5	0	0	0	0	0	0	0
2014	3	DF	(United States) USA	Whitney Engen	11	0	11	0	0	0	0	0	0	0
2026–	23	FW	(United States) USA	Kate Faasse	27	4	27	4	0	0	0	0	0	0
2017–2018	8	MF	(United States) USA	Claire Falknor	9	0	9	0	0	0	0	0	0	0
2022	28	FW	(United States) USA	Cali Farquharson	6	0	6	0	0	0	0	0	0	0
2019–2021	24	FW	(United States) USA	Jamia Fields	30	0	24	0	0	0	3	0	3	0
2016	19	MF	(United States) USA	Tessa Florio-Gavilsky	3	0	3	0	0	0	0	0	0	0
2022–2025	21	FW	(United States) USA	Ryan Gareis	61	1	53	1	0	0	8	0	0	0
2022	89	FW	(France) FRA	Valérie Gauvin	3	0	3	0	0	0	0	0	0	0
2021–2023	33, 26	MF	(United States) USA	Makamae Gomera-Stevens	22	0	16	0	0	0	6	0	0	0
2025–	23, 19	MF	(United States) USA	Maggie Graham	50	7	50	7	0	0	0	0	0	0
2023–2025	24	FW	(Argentina) ARG	Paulina Gramaglia	1	0	1	0	0	0	0	0	0	0
2020–2023	6, 10	MF	(United States) USA	Shea Groom	66	12	46	4	0	0	16	5	4	3
2017	9	FW	(United States) USA	Sarah Hagen	18	2	18	2	0	0	0	0	0	0
2026–	8	DF	(United States) USA	Natalie Hammond	9	0	9	0	0	0	0	0	0	0
2018–2022	9	MF	(United States) USA	Haley Hanson	100	1	80	1	0	0	16	0	4	0
2026–	18	DF	(United States) USA	Cate Hardin	18	0	18	0	0	0	0	0	0	0
2026–	34	FW	(United States) USA	Khyah Harper	14	0	14	0	0	0	0	0	0	0
2023–	37, 33	DF	(United States) USA	Jyllissa Harris	21	0	12	0	0	0	6	0	3	0
2020–2022	20	GK	(United States) USA	Lindsey Harris	9	0	6	0	0	0	3	0	0	0
2016–2017	27	MF	(United States) USA	Caity Heap	19	0	19	0	0	0	0	0	0	0
2022–2023	17	MF	(United States) USA	Kelcie Hedge	9	0	4	0	0	0	5	0	0	0
2025	42	DF	(United States) USA	Anna Heilferty	5	0	5	0	0	0	0	0	0	0
2014	21	DF	(United States) USA	Holly Hein	8	0	8	0	0	0	0	0	0	0
2014–2017	21	FW	(United States) USA	Melissa Henderson	37	0	37	0	0	0	0	0	0	0
2014–2019	18, 1, 30	GK	(Mexico) MEX	Bianca Henninger	20	0	20	0	0	0	0	0	0	0
2024–2025	18	GK	(United States) USA	Heather Hinz	3	0	1	0	0	0	0	0	2	0
2023–2024	30, 20	MF	(United States) USA	Sophie Hirst	23	1	19	1	0	0	2	0	2	0
2018–2019	23, 11	MF	(United States) USA	Sofia Huerta	36	10	36	10	0	0	0	0	0	0
2026–	47	FW	(Serbia) SRB	Miljana Ivanović	12	2	12	2	0	0	0	0	0	0
2014–2015	8	MF	(United States) USA	Jordan Jackson	29	2	29	2	0	0	0	0	0	0
2022–2025	30, 4	DF	(United States) USA	Natalie Jacobs	73	1	66	1	1	0	3	0	3	0
2023	36	DF	(United States) USA	Lindsi Jennings	8	0	3	0	0	0	5	0	0	0
2018	13	FW	(United States) USA	Savannah Jordan	10	0	10	0	0	0	0	0	0	0
2018	18	DF	(United States) USA	Kimberly Keever	11	1	11	1	0	0	0	0	0	0
2018	11	FW	(South Africa) RSA	Thembi Kgatlana	16	2	16	2	0	0	0	0	0	0
2019–2020, 2024	15, 5	FW	(United States) USA	CeCe Kizer	29	0	21	0	0	0	6	0	2	0
2014–2015	25	DF	(United States) USA	Meghan Klingenberg	19	0	19	0	0	0	0	0	0	0
2026–	4	DF	(United States) USA	Leah Klenke	30	1	30	1	0	0	0	0	0	0
2014	9	MF	(Canada) CAN	Kaylyn Kyle	19	0	19	0	0	0	0	0	0	0
2014–2015	13	DF	(United States) USA	Jen LaPonte	6	0	6	0	0	0	0	0	0	0
2025–	9	FW	(Canada) CAN	Clarissa Larisey	36	4	36	4	0	0	0	0	0	0
2018–2021	12	FW	(United States) USA	Veronica Latsko	62	10	47	7	0	0	11	0	4	3
2017	22	DF	(United States) USA	Camille Levin	22	0	22	0	0	0	0	0	0	0
2020–2025	25	DF	(United States) USA	Katie Lind	105	4	79	3	1	0	21	1	4	0
2015–2017	10	MF	(United States) USA	Carli Lloyd	27	11	27	11	0	0	0	0	0	0
2021	36	MF	(United States) USA	Amber Marshall	2	0	0	0	0	0	2	0	0	0
2014–2015	30	DF	(United States) USA	Ella Masar (Note: Masar scored the Dash's first-ever goal, which came against the Boston Breakers on April 20, 2014.)	37	5	37	5	0	0	0	0	0	0
2024–2026	27, 5	DF	(United States) USA	Zoe Matthews	2	0	2	0	0	0	0	0	0	0
2014–2015	12	FW	(United States) USA	Tiffany McCarty	37	5	37	5	0	0	0	0	0	0
2014	5	MF	(United States) USA	Tori McCombs	1	0	1	0	0	0	0	0	0	0
2019–2020	16	FW	(Jamaica) JAM	Kayla McCoy	1	0	1	0	0	0	0	0	0	0
2015	14	FW	(United States) USA	Jessica McDonald	20	7	20	7	0	0	0	0	0	0
2014	24	MF	(United States) USA	Kelly McFarlane	13	0	13	0	0	0	0	0	0	0
2024	40	GK	(United States) USA	Erin McKinney	1	0	0	0	0	0	0	0	1	0
2014–2015	1	GK	(Canada) CAN	Erin McLeod	31	0	31	0	0	0	0	0	0	0
2017–2021	19	MF	(United States) USA	Kristie Mewis	67	14	54	9	0	0	9	3	4	2
2016	4	DF	(United States) USA	Becca Moros	17	0	17	0	0	0	0	0	0	0
2018	10	MF	(South Africa) RSA	Linda Motlhalo	21	1	21	1	0	0	0	0	0	0
2018	21	MF	(Republic of Ireland) IRL	Alli Murphy	1	0	1	0	0	0	0	0	0	0
2019	44	DF	(Jamaica) JAM	Satara Murray	9	0	9	0	0	0	0	0	0	0
2024	14	FW	(Japan) JPN	Yūki Nagasato	24	3	21	2	0	0	0	0	3	1
2019–2021	10	MF	(United States) USA	Christine Nairn	35	1	27	1	0	0	4	0	4	0
2015	16	MF	(United States) USA	Ashley Nick	3	0	3	0	0	0	0	0	0	0
2024–	7, 14	DF	(United States) USA	Paige Nielsen	76	2	74	2	0	0	0	0	2	0
2014	10	MF	(Mexico) MEX	Teresa Noyola	10	3	10	3	0	0	0	0	0	0
2016–2017	13	MF	(Republic of Ireland) IRL	Denise O'Sullivan	29	2	29	2	0	0	0	0	0	0
2014–2017	22	DF	(United States) USA	Stephanie Ochs	39	0	39	0	0	0	0	0	0	0
2014–2019	7	FW	(United States) USA	Kealia Ohai	114	28	114	28	0	0	0	0	0	0
2014	20	DF	(Nigeria) NGR	Osinachi Ohale	19	1	19	1	0	0	0	0	0	0
2023–2025	15, 10	MF	(Venezuela) VEN	Bárbara Olivieri	50	8	44	6	0	0	3	1	3	1
2023–2025	11, 9	FW	(Mexico) MEX	Diana Ordóñez	56	11	47	8	0	0	6	1	3	2
2020–2021	11	DF	(United States) USA	Megan Oyster	32	0	21	0	0	0	9	0	2	0
2024–	30, 15	DF	(United States) USA	Avery Patterson	76	4	73	4	0	0	0	0	3	0
2023–2024	5	DF	(United States) USA	Courtney Petersen	38	0	29	0	0	0	6	0	3	0
2016–2017	2	DF	(Brazil) BRA	Poliana	37	5	37	5	0	0	0	0	0	0
2018–2019	8	DF	(Australia) AUS	Clare Polkinghorne	18	0	18	0	0	0	0	0	0	0
2015	5	DF	(United States) USA	Toni Pressley	15	0	15	0	0	0	0	0	0	0
2017–2023	14, 8	FW	(Canada) CAN	Nichelle Prince	107	14	88	12	1	0	14	1	4	1
2019–2023	23	DF	(United States) USA	Ally Prisock	89	2	69	1	1	0	15	1	4	0
2015–2017, 2019–2021	23, 28	MF	(United States) USA	Cami Privett	40	0	39	0	0	0	1	0	0	0
2023–	17	MF	(Austria) AUT	Sarah Puntigam	71	1	67	1	0	0	2	0	2	0
2026–	22	FW	(United States) USA	Kat Rader	30	10	30	10	0	0	0	0	0	0
2014	15	MF	(United States) USA	Domi Richardson	2	0	2	0	0	0	0	0	0	0
2025	89	MF	(United States) USA	Chloe Ricketts	1	0	1	0	0	0	0	0	0	0
2026–	25	FW	(United States) USA	Makenzy Robbe	3	1	3	1	0	0	0	0	0	0
2016–2017	5	DF	(United States) USA	Cari Roccaro	33	0	33	0	0	0	0	0	0	0
2015	9	FW	(Republic of Ireland) IRL	Stephanie Roche	2	0	2	0	0	0	0	0	0	0
2014, 2019	2	DF	(Mexico) MEX	Arianna Romero	31	0	31	0	0	0	0	0	0	0
2020–2022	4	MF	(Canada) CAN	Maegan Rosa	8	0	4	0	0	0	2	0	2	0
2024	31	MF	(Sweden) SWE	Elin Rubensson	15	0	15	0	0	0	0	0	0	0
2025–2026	11	FW	(United States) USA	Yazmeen Ryan	25	4	25	4	0	0	0	0	0	0
2022–2023	11, 9	FW	(England) ENG	Ebony Salmon	36	11	29	10	1	0	6	1	0	0
2021–2024	7	FW	(Mexico) MEX	María Sánchez	62	8	49	7	1	0	12	1	0	0
2019–	23, 13	MF	(Canada) CAN	Sophie Schmidt	146	10	121	5	1	1	17	1	7	3
2021–2022	5	MF	(United States) USA	Gabby Seiler	28	2	24	2	0	0	4	0	0	0
2014–2015	4	DF	(Canada) CAN	Lauren Sesselmann	1	0	1	0	0	0	0	0	0	0
2025–2026	8	MF	(United States) USA	Delanie Sheehan	26	1	26	1	0	0	0	0	0	0
2018–2019	6	MF	(United States) USA	Meleana Shim	8	0	8	0	0	0	0	0	0	0
2020	17	DF	(United States) USA	Erin Simon	6	0	0	0	0	0	5	0	1	0
2018–2019	17	FW	(Australia) AUS	Kyah Simon	25	4	25	4	0	0	0	0	0	0
2025	35	GK	(United States) USA	Abby Smith	9	0	9	0	0	0	0	0	0	0
2021	29	MF	(Iceland) ISL	Andrea Rán Snæfeld Hauksdóttir	1	0	1	0	0	0	0	0	0	0
2023–2024	6	MF	(Jamaica) JAM	Havana Solaun	16	1	14	1	0	0	2	0	0	0
2024	22	DF	(United States) USA	Croix Soto	3	0	3	0	0	0	0	0	0	0
2014	6	FW	(Brazil) BRA	Rafaelle Souza	16	0	16	0	0	0	0	0	0	0
2021	22	FW	(United States) USA	Jasmyne Spencer	18	1	18	1	0	0	0	0	0	0
2020–2021	7	FW	(United States) USA	Katie Stengel	11	0	1	0	0	0	6	0	4	0
2024	3	DF	(Brazil) BRA	Tarciane	11	0	11	0	0	0	0	0	0	0
2014	16	DF	(United States) USA	Kika Toulouse	7	0	7	0	0	0	0	0	0	0
2023	39	FW	(United States) USA	Cameron Tucker	17	0	12	0	0	0	5	0	0	0
2016	9	FW	(England) ENG	Chioma Ubogagu	15	1	15	1	0	0	0	0	0	0
2026–	30	MF	(United States) USA	Linda Ullmark	26	3	26	3	0	0	0	0	0	0
2017–2018	55	DF	(South Africa) RSA	Janine van Wyk	37	0	37	0	0	0	0	0	0	0
2024–	12	MF	(Jamaica) JAM	Kiki Van Zanten	46	7	46	7	0	0	0	0	0	0
2022–2023	15, 14	MF	(United States) USA	Marisa Viggiano	52	3	40	2	1	0	11	1	0	0
2020–2022	14	MF	(United States) USA	Brianna Visalli	47	3	32	3	0	0	12	0	3	0
2014	26	MF	(United States) USA	Nikki Washington	3	0	3	0	0	0	0	0	0	0
2024–	16	FW	(Canada) CAN	Amanda West	18	0	16	0	0	0	0	0	2	0
2025–2026	20	DF	(United States) USA	Christen Westphal	9	0	9	0	0	0	0	0	0	0
2015	2	DF	(United States) USA	Carleigh Williams	2	0	2	0	0	0	0	0	0	0
2016–2017	18	GK	(Australia) AUS	Lydia Williams	23	0	23	0	0	0	0	0	0	0
2024	29	FW	(United States) USA	Madison Wolfbauer	1	0	0	0	0	0	0	0	1	0

== By nationality ==
In total, 175 players representing 22 different countries have appeared for the Houston Dash.

Note: Countries indicate national team as defined under FIFA eligibility rules. Players may hold more than one non-FIFA nationality.

Country	Total players
Argentina	1
Australia	4
Austria	2
Bosnia and Herzegovina	1
Brazil	8
Canada	11
Cameroon	1
England	4
France	1
Iceland	1
Italy	1
Jamaica	5
Japan	1
Mexico	7
Nigeria	2
Republic of Ireland	3
Serbia	1
South Africa	3
Sweden	2
Switzerland	1
United States	114
Venezuela	3

== See also ==
- 2014 NWSL Expansion Draft
- List of top-division football clubs in CONCACAF countries
- List of professional sports teams in the United States and Canada
