= 2026 Houston Dash season =

National Women's Soccer League season

Houston Dash
2026 season
- Owners: List of Houston Dash owners
- President of Women's Soccer: Angela Hucles Mangano
- Head Coach: Jaime Frias (interim, Sep 13–Nov 17); Fabrice Gautrat (until Sep 13)
- Stadium: Shell Energy Stadium (capacity: 20,656)
- League: 12th
- NWSL Playoffs: DNQ
- Top goalscorer: Kat Rader (10)
- Highest home attendance: 10,259 (Mar 21 vs BOS)
- Lowest home attendance: 5,168 (May 20 vs SD)
- Average home league attendance: 6,917
- Biggest win: 5–0 (vs CHI (H), NWSL, Aug 19)
- Biggest defeat: 0–3 (vs KC (A), NWSL, May 15)
Home colors	Away colors	Third colors
- All statistics correct as of November 17, 2026.

The 2026 Houston Dash season was the team's thirteenth season as an American professional women's soccer team in the National Women's Soccer League (NWSL).

== Background ==
In head coach Fabrice Gautrat's first season leading the club, the Dash finished in 10th place out of 14 teams and failed to qualify for the 2025 NWSL playoffs. The team's scoring offense was second to last, with 27 goals scored in the regular season, and its defense conceded 39 goals. Yazmeen Ryan led the team in scoring with 4 goals, and goalkeeper Jane Campbell reached 600 career saves and 15,000 career minutes played.

In the offseason, the Dash traded Michelle Alozie to Chicago Stars FC, lost free agent and 2025 assists leader Ryan Gareis to Chicago, and lost backup goalkeeper Abby Smith to Denver Summit FC. Centerback Katie Lind also retired.

Houston acquired former San Diego Wave FC forward Makenzy Robbe, and also signed several rookies, including 2024 Hermann Trophy winner Kate Faasse from the North Carolina Tar Heels, Kat Rader from Duke, Linda Ullmark from the Tar Heels, and Leah Klenke from Notre Dame.

== Players and staff ==
=== Current squad ===
As of August 9, 2026.

No.	Pos.	Nation	Player
1	GK	USA	Jane Campbell
2	DF	CAN	Allysha Chapman
4	DF	USA	Leah Klenke
6	FW	USA	Messiah Bright
7	MF	SWE	Evelina Duljan
8	DF	USA	Natalie Hammond
9	FW	CAN	Clarissa Larisey
10	DF	USA	Malia Berkely
12	MF	JAM	Kiki Van Zanten
13	MF	CAN	Sophie Schmidt
14	DF	USA	Paige Nielsen
15	DF	USA	Avery Patterson
17	MF	AUT	Sarah Puntigam
18	DF	USA	Cate Hardin
19	MF	USA	Maggie Graham
21	GK	USA	Hillary Beall
22	FW	USA	Kat Rader
23	FW	USA	Kate Faasse
24	MF	USA	Danielle Colaprico
25	FW	USA	Makenzy Robbe (SEI)
27	DF	ITA	Lisa Boattin
30	MF	USA	Linda Ullmark
34	MF	USA	Khyah Harper
40	GK	USA	Caroline DeLisle
47	FW	SRB	Miljana Ivanović

==== Out on loan ====
No.	Pos.	Nation	Player
3	GK	USA	Liz Beardsley (at Tampa Bay Sun FC)
16	FW	CAN	Amanda West (at FC Rosengård)
29	DF	BRA	Rebeca Costa Da Silva (at Dux Logroño)
33	DF	USA	Jyllissa Harris (at Ottawa Rapid FC)

=== Current staff ===
On February 14, the Dash announced the hiring of Twila Kilgore as technical director. On September 13, the Dash announced the firing of both Kilgore and head coach Fabrice Gautrat, and the appointment of assistant coach Jaime Frias as interim head coach.

As of September 13, 2026.

Executive
President of Women's Soccer	Angela Hucles Mangano
Assistant General Manager	Jason Lowe
Coaching
Interim Head Coach	Jaime Frias
Assistant Coach	Oscar Rivero
Goalkeeper Coach	Matt Pickens
Assistant Goalkeeper Coach	Megan Kinneman
Player Development Coach	Marina Schachowskoj
Technical Staff
Technical Director	Vacant
Director of Recruitment and Analytics	Michael Poma
Recruitment Analyst	Adelaide Gilley
Data and Video Analyst	Chloe Dhillon
Head of Performance	Bethan Lloyd
Performance Coach	Jeffery Duarte
Applied Sport Scientist	Ariana Dinberg
Medical Director	Wafaa Chatila
Head Athletic Trainer	Matthew Hutton
Assistant Athletic Trainer	Jill Davis
Physical Therapist	Dorcas Copa
Team Dietitian	Bianca Paulus
Dietitian Fellow	Hannah Mitroff
Head of Equipment	Matthew Hickman
Equipment Manager	Gina Monaco
Front Office
Player Care Coordinator	Emily Perez Velez
Team Administrator	Claire Quaasdorff
Security Manager	Martha Sanchez

== Competitions ==
=== Regular season ===
==== Regular season standings ====
Pos	Team	Pld	W	D	L	GF	GA	GD	Pts
10	Denver Summit FC	30	11	8	11	53	42	+11	41
11	Orlando Pride	30	11	3	16	39	47	−8	36
12	Houston Dash	30	9	6	15	38	44	−6	33
13	Boston Legacy FC	30	9	6	15	41	53	−12	33
14	Bay FC	30	7	6	17	30	47	−17	27

Source: NWSL
Rules for classification: 1) points; 2) total goal difference; 3) total wins; 4) total goals scored; 5) head-to-head points; 6) head-to-head goal goals scored; 7) fewest disciplinary points; 8) coin toss (if 2 clubs tied) or drawing of lots (if ≥3 clubs tied).

==== Results summary ====
Overall								Home						Away					
Pld	W	D	L	GF	GA	GD	Pts	W	D	L	GF	GA	GD	W	D	L	GF	GA	GD
30	9	6	15	38	44	−6	33	5	3	7	22	21	+1	4	3	8	16	23	−7

Last updated: November 1, 2026.
Source: NWSLsoccer.com

==== Results by matchday ====
Matchday	1	2	3	4	5	6	7	8	9	10	11	12	13	14	15	16	17	18	19	20	21	22	23	24	25	26	27	28	29	30
Ground	A	H	A	H	H	H	A	H	A	H	H	A	A	A	A	H	H	H	A	H	A	A	A	H	A	A	H	H	A	H
Result	W	W	L	W	L	D	L	L	L	D	W	L	L	D	D	W	L	D	W	W	L	L	L	L	W	D	L	L	W	L
Position	2	2	5	5	8	6	7	9	10	12	12	12	12	12	13	12	13	13	11	9	9	10	12	12	12	12	12	12	12	12

Updated to match(es) played on November 1, 2026. Source: NWSLsoccer.com
A = Away; H = Home; W = Win; D = Draw; L = Loss; P = Postponed; = NWSL Shield; = NWSL Playoffs

==== Matches ====
Win Draw Loss

March 14, 2026 1	San Diego Wave FC	1–0	Houston Dash	San Diego, California
5:45 p.m. PDT (UTC-7)		Report	Robbe 45+7'; Larisey (yellow card) 80'; Van Zanten (yellow card) 88'	Stadium: Snapdragon Stadium; Attendance: 14,078; Referee: Muhammad Hassan

March 21, 2026 2	Houston Dash	3–0	Boston Legacy FC	Houston, Texas
3:00 p.m. CDT (UTC-5)	Berkely (penalty missed) 13'; Van Zanten 43', 59'; Colaprico (yellow card) 57'; Rader 65'	Report	Gutierres (yellow card) 29'; Carabalí (yellow card) 75'	Stadium: Shell Energy Stadium; Attendance: 10,259; Referee: Joe Suchoski

March 27, 2026 3	Angel City FC	2–1	Houston Dash	Los Angeles, California
7:00 p.m. PDT (UTC-7)	Shores (yellow card) 14'; Jónsdóttir 47', (yellow card) 69'; Tiernan 49'	Report	Graham 10'; Colaprico (yellow card) 25'; Van Zanten (yellow card) 88'	Stadium: BMO Stadium; Attendance: 13,896; Referee: Mark Verso

April 3, 2026 4	Houston Dash	4–3	Racing Louisville FC	Houston, Texas
7:30 p.m. CDT (UTC-5)	Rader 39' (pen.); Nielsen (yellow card) 45+5'; Van Zanten 50', 67'; Campbell (yellow card) 78'; Puntigam 90+9' (pen.); Patterson (yellow card) 90+12'	Report	Flint 23' (pen.), 81' (pen.); Weber 48'; Hodge (yellow card) 56'; O'Kane (yellow card) 69'	Stadium: Shell Energy Stadium; Attendance: 5,442; Referee: Alex Billeter

April 25, 2026 5	Houston Dash	0–1	North Carolina Courage	Houston, Texas
7:00 p.m. CDT (UTC-5)	Patterson (yellow card) 58'; Nielsen (yellow card) 90+2'	Report	Shiragaki (yellow card) 19'; Sanchez 42'; Schlegel (red card) 77'	Stadium: Shell Energy Stadium; Attendance: 6,811; Referee: Matthew Corrigan

May 1, 2026 6	Houston Dash	0–0	Seattle Reign FC	Houston, Texas
7:00 p.m. CDT (UTC-5)		Report	McCammon (yellow card) 28'; Mercado (yellow card) 39'; Huerta (yellow card) 51'; Curry (yellow card) 68'	Stadium: Shell Energy Stadium; Attendance: 5,465; Referee: Abdou Ndiaye

May 6, 2026 7	Utah Royals	2–0	Houston Dash	Sandy, Utah
8:00 p.m. MDT (UTC-6)	Lacasse 38'; Tejada (yellow card) 71'; Brown 88'; Pierre-Louis (yellow card) 90+7'	Report	Ekić (yellow card) 28'	Stadium: America First Field; Attendance: 6,789; Referee: Natalie Simon

May 9, 2026 8	Houston Dash	1–4	Denver Summit FC	Houston, Texas
7:00 p.m. CDT (UTC-5)	Graham 45' (pen.); Colaprico (yellow card) 51'; Ullmark (yellow card) 74'	Report	Sonis 15', 72'; Flint 34'; Sheehan 49'	Stadium: Shell Energy Stadium; Attendance: 7,111; Referee: Laadi Issaka

May 15, 2026 9	Kansas City Current	3–0	Houston Dash	Kansas City, Missouri
7:00 p.m. CDT (UTC-5)	Campbell 15' (o.g.); Chawinga 17', 68'	Report	Ullmark (yellow card) 21'	Stadium: CPKC Stadium; Attendance: 11,500; Referee: Shawn Tehini

May 20, 2026 10	Houston Dash	2–2	San Diego Wave FC	Houston, Texas
7:00 p.m. CDT (UTC-5)	Patterson (yellow card) 23'; Faasse 70'; Rader 89'	Report	Dudinha 20'; M. Van Zanten (yellow card) 24'; Morroni (yellow card) 32'; Byars (yellow card) 83', (goal) 90+5'; Fazer (yellow card) 90+8'	Stadium: Shell Energy Stadium; Attendance: 5,168; Referee: Gerald Flores

May 23, 2026 11	Houston Dash	2–1	Angel City FC	Houston, Texas
7:45 p.m. CDT (UTC-5)	Hardin (yellow card) 10'; Rader 17'; Klenke (yellow card) 25'; Graham (yellow card) 31', (goal) 90+1'; Patterson (yellow card) 74'	Report	Niehues 26' (pen.); Sams (yellow card) 28'; Phair (yellow card) 77'	Stadium: Shell Energy Stadium; Attendance: 6,207; Referee: Muhammad Kaleia

May 31, 2026 12	Gotham FC	1–0	Houston Dash	Harrison, New Jersey
3:00 p.m. EDT (UTC-4)	Dudley 18'; Howell (yellow card) 90'	Report		Stadium: Sports Illustrated Stadium; Attendance: 10,549; Referee: Joshua Encarnacion

July 3, 2026 13	Washington Spirit	2–1	Houston Dash	Washington, D.C.
8:00 p.m. EDT (UTC-4)	Kouassi (penalty missed) 35'; Rodman 50', 90+4'; Abiodun (yellow card) 66'	Report	Patterson (yellow card) 33'; Schmidt (yellow card) 87'; Faasse 89'	Stadium: Audi Field; Attendance: 15,792; Referee: Danielle Chesky

July 12, 2026 14	Denver Summit FC	2–2	Houston Dash	Commerce City, Colorado
5:00 p.m. MDT (UTC-6)	Ryan 14'; Sonis 45+3' (pen.)	Report	Rader 15'; Ullmark 48'	Stadium: Dick's Sporting Goods Park; Attendance: 15,131; Referee: Muhammad Hassan

July 18, 2026 15	Racing Louisville FC	1–1	Houston Dash	Louisville, Kentucky
8:00 p.m. EDT (UTC-4)	Fischer 19', (yellow card) 28'; Sears (yellow card) 71'; Hodge (yellow card) 81'; Flint (yellow card) 90+7'	Report	Ullmark (yellow card) 8'; Chapman (yellow card) 23'; Rader 90+5'	Stadium: Lynn Family Stadium; Attendance: 4,728; Referee: Matthew Thompson

July 24, 2026 16	Houston Dash	1–0	Bay FC	Houston, Texas
7:00 p.m. CDT (UTC-5)	Patterson (yellow card) 39'; Ullmark 90+1'; Larisey (yellow card) 90+5'	Report	Conti (yellow card) 66'	Stadium: Shell Energy Stadium; Attendance: 7,270; Referee: Shawn Tehini

August 1, 2026 17	Houston Dash	0–1	Gotham FC	Houston, Texas
7:00 p.m. CDT (UTC-5)	Boattin (yellow card) 4'; Larisey (yellow card) 90+1'	Report	Kerr (penalty missed) 22', 46'	Stadium: Shell Energy Stadium; Attendance: 7,512; Referee: Lauren Aldrich

August 8, 2026 18	Houston Dash	1–1	Kansas City Current	Houston, Texas
7:45 p.m. CDT (UTC-5)	Rader (yellow card) 70', (goal) 81' (pen.)	Report	Debinha 44'; Scott (yellow card) 72'; Robinson (yellow card) 79'; Hocking (yellow card) 87'	Stadium: Shell Energy Stadium; Attendance: 7,112; Referee: Marie Durr

August 16, 2026 19	North Carolina Courage	2–3	Houston Dash	Cary, North Carolina
7:00 p.m. EDT (UTC-4)	Schlegel 37'; Ijeh 51'	Report	Faasse 42'; Larisey 80', 90+3'; Colaprico (yellow card) 86'	Stadium: WakeMed Soccer Park; Attendance: 7,031; Referee: Jamie Padilla

August 19, 2026 20	Houston Dash	5–0	Chicago Stars FC	Houston, Texas
7:00 p.m. CDT (UTC-5)	Rader 5', 42'; Ullmark 45+2'; Faasse 79'; Colaprico (yellow card) 62'; Boattin 90+1'	Report	Staab (yellow card) 45+2'	Stadium: Shell Energy Stadium; Attendance: 5,214; Referee: John Matto

August 23, 2026 21	Bay FC	1–0	Houston Dash	San José, California
3:00 p.m. PDT (UTC-7)	Collins (yellow card) 84'; Girelli 89'	Report		Stadium: PayPal Park; Attendance: 12,548; Referee: Abdou Ndiaye

August 30, 2026 22	Seattle Reign FC	1–0	Houston Dash	Seattle, Washington
4:00 p.m. PDT (UTC-7)	Dahlien 52'; Ratcliffe (yellow card) 90+3'	Report	Van Zanten (yellow card) 11'; Ivanović (yellow card) 90+1'	Stadium: Lumen Field; Attendance: 7,878; Referee: Laura Rodriguez

September 6, 2026 23	Orlando Pride	3–1	Houston Dash	Orlando, Florida
7:00 p.m. PDT (UTC-7)	Klenke 14' (o.g.); Banda 44' (pen.); McCutcheon 64', (yellow card) 86'; Lekven (yellow card) 89'	Report	Van Zanten 72'; Graham (yellow card) 81'	Stadium: Inter.co Stadium; Attendance: 7,156; Referee: Rodrigo Albuquerque

September 12, 2026 24	Houston Dash	0–1	Utah Royals	Houston, Texas
7:00 p.m. CDT (UTC-5)	Patterson (yellow card) 52'; Colaprico (yellow card) 58'; Nielsen (yellow card) 88'	Report	Tanaka 69'	Stadium: Shell Energy Stadium; Attendance: 6,637; Referee: Servando Berna Rico

September 20, 2026 25	Boston Legacy FC	1–2	Houston Dash	Foxboro, Massachusetts
2:00 p.m. EDT (UTC-4)	Traoré (yellow card) 24', (goal) 59'	Report	Colaprico 44'; Bright 85'	Stadium: Gillette Stadium; Attendance: 9,739; Referee: Brad Jensen

September 26, 2026 26	Portland Thorns FC	1–1	Houston Dash	Portland, Oregon
5:45 p.m. PDT (UTC-7)	Müller (yellow card) 77', (goal) 85'	Report	Rader 10'; Van Zanten (yellow card) 39'	Stadium: Providence Park; Attendance: 18,247; Referee: Trevor Wiseman

October 4, 2026 27	Houston Dash	2–3	Washington Spirit	Houston, Texas
6:00 p.m. CDT (UTC-5)	Ivanović 44', 59'; Larisey (yellow card) 86'	Report	Rudd 11'; Cantore 51'; Luvanga 84'	Stadium: Shell Energy Stadium; Attendance: 7,917; Referee: Jaclyn Metz

October 18, 2026 28	Houston Dash	1–2	Orlando Pride	Houston, Texas
12:00 p.m. CDT (UTC-5)	Colaprico 55'; Nielsen (yellow card) 46'	Report	Luana 16' (pen.); Washington 31'	Stadium: Shell Energy Stadium; Attendance: 7,248; Referee: Shawn Tehini

October 23, 2026 29	Chicago Stars FC	1–3	Houston Dash	Evanston, Illinois
7:00 p.m. CDT (UTC-5)	Dellarose (yellow card) 87'; Staab 90+3'	Report	Klenke 4', (yellow card) 51'; Graham 54'; Puntigam (yellow card) 77'; Larisey 79'	Stadium: Martin Stadium; Attendance: 5,961; Referee: Adorae Monroy

November 1, 2026 30	Houston Dash	0–2	Portland Thorns FC	Houston, Texas
4:00 p.m. CDT (UTC-5)		Report	Wilson 34', 70' (pen.); Perry (yellow card) 41'	Stadium: Shell Energy Stadium; Attendance: 8,375; Referee: Joshua Encarnación

== Statistics ==
As of August 16, 2026

=== Appearances and goals ===
Starting appearances are listed first, followed by substitute appearances after the + symbol where applicable.

No.	Pos	Nat	Player	Total		NWSL	
No.	Pos	Nat	Player	Apps	Goals	Apps	Goals
Goalkeepers
1	GK	(United States) USA	Jane Campbell	18	0	18	0
21	GK	(United States) USA	Hillary Beall	0	0	0	0
40	GK	(United States) USA	Caroline DeLisle	2	0	1+1	0
Defenders
2	DF	(Canada) CAN	Allysha Chapman	13	0	5+8	0
4	DF	(United States) USA	Leah Klenke	19	0	18+1	0
8	DF	(United States) USA	Natalie Bain	2	0	0+2	0
10	DF	(United States) USA	Malia Berkely	17	0	9+8	0
14	DF	(United States) USA	Paige Nielsen	19	0	18+1	0
15	DF	(United States) USA	Avery Patterson	17	0	17	0
18	DF	(United States) USA	Cate Hardin	12	0	6+6	0
27	DF	(Italy) ITA	Lisa Boattin	15	0	9+6	0
Midfielders
7	MF	(Sweden) SWE	Evelina Duljan	0	0	0	0
11	MF	(Bosnia and Herzegovina) BIH	Emina Ekić	5	0	1+4	0
12	MF	(Jamaica) JAM	Kiki Van Zanten	14	4	11+3	4
13	MF	(Canada) CAN	Sophie Schmidt	10	0	0+10	0
17	MF	(Austria) AUT	Sarah Puntigam	14	1	5+9	1
19	MF	(United States) USA	Maggie Graham	19	3	18+1	3
24	MF	(United States) USA	Danielle Colaprico	19	0	17+2	0
30	MF	(United States) USA	Linda Ullmark	19	2	19	2
34	MF	(United States) USA	Khyah Harper	3	0	1+2	0
Forwards
6	FW	(United States) USA	Messiah Bright	8	0	2+6	0
9	FW	(Canada) CAN	Clarissa Larisey	16	2	2+14	2
22	FW	(United States) USA	Kat Rader	19	7	18+1	7
23	FW	(United States) USA	Kate Faasse	16	3	11+5	3
47	FW	(Serbia) SRB	Miljana Ivanović	1	0	0+1	0
Other players (departed during season, out on loan, season-ending injury etc.)
3	GK	(United States) USA	Liz Beardsley	0	0	0	0
16	FW	(Canada) CAN	Amanda West	0	0	0	0
18	FW	(United States) USA	Yazmeen Ryan	1	0	0+1	0
25	FW	(United States) USA	Makenzy Robbe	3	1	3	1
29	DF	(Brazil) BRA	Rebeca Costa Da Silva	0	0	0	0
33	DF	(United States) USA	Jyllissa Harris	0	0	0	0

== Transactions ==
=== Re-signings ===
Date	Nat.	Player	Pos.	Notes	Ref.
December 9, 2025	(Sweden)	Evelina Duljan	MF	Signed contract through the 2026 season with a 2027 club option.	
March 3, 2026	(United States)	Avery Patterson	FW	Signed a contract extension through 2028.	
June 5, 2026	(United States)	Maggie Graham	MF	Signed a contract extension through 2029.	

=== Transfers in ===
Date	Nat.	Player	Pos.	Previous club	Notes	Ref.
December 8, 2025	(United States)	Hillary Beall	GK	(United States) San Diego Wave FC	Signed contract through the 2027 season.	
January 7, 2026	(United States)	Kat Rader	FW	(United States) Duke Blue Devils	Signed contract through the 2028 season.	
January 8, 2026	(United States)	Leah Klenke	DF	(United States) Notre Dame Fighting Irish	Signed contract through the 2028 season.	
January 13, 2026	(United States)	Linda Ullmark	MF	(United States) North Carolina Tar Heels	Signed contract through the 2029 season.	
January 14, 2026	(United States)	Kate Faasse	FW	(United States) North Carolina Tar Heels	Signed contract through the 2028 season.	
January 22, 2026	(United States)	Caroline DeLisle	GK	(Sweden) IFK Norrköping	Signed contract through the 2026 season.	
January 26, 2026	(United States)	Makenzy Robbe	FW	(United States) San Diego Wave FC	Signed contract through the 2026 season.	
March 5, 2026	(United States)	Cate Hardin	DF	(United States) Georgia Bulldogs	Signed contract through the 2026 season.	
April 10, 2026	(United States)	Natalie Bain	DF	(United States) Xavier Musketeers	Signed contract through the 2026 season.	
April 28, 2026	(Bosnia and Herzegovina)	Emina Ekić	MF	(United States) Lexington SC	Signed contract through the 2027 season with a mutual option for 2028.	
June 25, 2026	(Serbia)	Miljana Ivanović	FW	(Sweden) Malmö FF	Signed contract through the 2028 season.	
July 28, 2026	(United States)	Khyah Harper	MF	(United States) Gotham FC	Free transfer	

=== Transfers out ===
Date	Nat.	Player	Pos.	Destination club	Notes	Ref.
November 17, 2025	(United States)	Anna Heilferty	MF	(United States) Tampa Bay Sun FC	Free agent; short-term contract expired.	
December 23, 2025	(Nigeria)	Michelle Alozie	DF	(United States) Chicago Stars FC	Traded in exchange for $40,000 of allocation money.	
March 19, 2026	(United States)	Yazmeen Ryan	FW	(United States) Denver Summit FC	Traded with $150,000 in allocation funds, in exchange for $800,000 in Intra-League Transfer funds and $200,000 in Expansion Allocation funds, as well as up to $100,000 in conditional transfer funds and an additional conditional sell-on fee.	
March 19, 2026	(United States)	Delanie Sheehan	MF	(United States) Denver Summit FC	Traded with $150,000 in allocation funds, in exchange for $800,000 in Intra-League Transfer funds and $200,000 in Expansion Allocation funds, as well as up to $100,000 in conditional transfer funds and an additional conditional sell-on fee.	
April 24, 2026	(United States)	Christen Westphal	DF		Contract mutually terminated.	
July 1, 2026	(United States)	Zoe Matthews	DF/MF		Contract mutually terminated.	
August 17, 2026	(Bosnia and Herzegovina)	Emina Ekić	MF	(Italy) Parma	Traded in exchange for an undisclosed fee.	
