= Cate Hardin =

American soccer player (born 2003)

- Hardin with the Houston Dash in 2026

Personal information
- Full name: Mary Catherine Hardin
- Date of birth: March 20, 2003 (age 23)
- Height: 5 ft 8 in (1.73 m)
- Positions: Defender; midfielder

Team information
- Current team: Houston Dash
- Number: 18

Youth career
- Concorde Fire

College career
| Years | Team | Apps | (Gls) |
| 2022–2025 | Georgia Bulldogs | 81 | (2) |

Senior career*
| Years | Team | Apps | (Gls) |
| 2026– | Houston Dash | 18 | (0) |
- * Club domestic league appearances and goals as of 03:13, November 8, 2026 (UTC)

Mary Catherine Hardin (born March 20, 2003) is an American professional soccer player who plays as a defender or midfielder for the Houston Dash of the National Women's Soccer League (NWSL). She played college soccer for the Georgia Bulldogs, where she set the program record for career appearances.

== Early life ==
Hardin grew up in Marietta, Georgia. Both of her parents and her brother are former collegiate athletes. Hardin attended Fellowship Christian School for high school, scoring 102 goals in 45 matches with the soccer team. She was a three-year team captain and one-time all-state honoree. In 2022, she won both her school's Female Athlete of the Year award, in addition to a spot on the all-region soccer team. Hardin also captained her club team, Concorde Fire, leading the team to a 2021 Elite Clubs National League conference championship.

== College career ==
Hardin played four years of college soccer at the University of Georgia. She tallied her first career goal for the Bulldogs on September 16, 2022, opening the scoring in Georgia's Southeastern Conference (SEC) season-opener against Texas A&M. As a rookie, she played primarily at center back and combined with the Bulldogs' backline to allow only 12 goals on the season. The following year, Hardin started in all but one of her 22 appearances and ranked third on Georgia's squad in minutes played. She helped the Bulldogs win their first-ever SEC tournament title and subsequently reach the NCAA tournament Round of 16, where she registered an assist to Croix Bethune as Georgia were ultimately knocked out by Clemson.

Despite making only 16 appearances as a junior in 2024, the lowest in her career, Hardin bounced back in 2025, captaining the Bulldogs, starting all 21 matches and racking up the most minutes of any field player on her team. Despite operating from the backline, Hardin also managed to become an attacking threat in her senior year, leading the Bulldogs in assists and ranking third in shots. Her performances earned her a spot on the All-SEC second team, her first-ever conference honor. She finished her collegiate career at Georgia having set program records in appearances, starts, and minutes played.

== Club career ==
Hardin was invited to the Houston Dash's 2026 preseason camp as a non-rostered trialist. She participated in multiple of the Dash's preseason games, including in the Coachella Valley Invitational. On March 5, 2026, the Dash announced that they had signed Hardin to her first professional contract, a one-year deal. Hardin made her pro debut on March 21, 2026, coming on as a late-game substitute for Maggie Graham in Houston's home-opening victory over expansion team Boston Legacy FC. On May 6, she made her first professional start, playing all 90 minutes of a 2–0 loss to the Utah Royals. In October 2026, Hardin signed a new contract with the Dash, lasting through the 2028 NWSL season.

== Career statistics ==
=== Club ===
As of June 11, 2026

Appearances and goals by club, season and competition
| Club | Season | League | | | Cup | | Playoffs | | Total | |
| Club | Season | Division | Apps | Goals | Apps | Goals | Apps | Goals | Apps | Goals |
|---|---|---|---|---|---|---|---|---|---|---|
| Houston Dash | 2026 | NWSL | 10 | 0 | — | | — | | 10 | 0 |
| Career total | | | 10 | 0 | 0 | 0 | 0 | 0 | 10 | 0 |

== Honors and awards ==
Georgia Bulldogs

- SEC women's soccer tournament: 2023

Individual

- Second-team All-SEC: 2025
