= Caroline DeLisle =

American soccer player (born 2000)

- DeLisle with the Houston Dash in 2026

Personal information
- Full name: Caroline Marie DeLisle
- Date of birth: March 22, 2000 (age 26)
- Height: 5 ft 10 in (1.78 m)
- Position: Goalkeeper

Team information
- Current team: Houston Dash
- Number: 40

Youth career
- West Florida Flames

College career
Years	Team	Apps	(Gls)
2018–2023	UCF Knights	77	(0)

Senior career*
Years	Team	Apps	(Gls)
2024	San Diego Wave	0	(0)
2024–2025	IFK Norrköping	19	(0)
2026–	Houston Dash	2	(0)
- * Club domestic league appearances and goals as of 03:12, November 8, 2026 (UTC)

Caroline Marie DeLisle (born March 22, 2000) is an American professional soccer player who plays as a goalkeeper for the Houston Dash of the National Women's Soccer League (NWSL). She played college soccer for the UCF Knights, where she set the program record for career shutouts. She has previously played for IFK Norrköping in Sweden.

== Early life ==
DeLisle was raised in Tampa, Florida, where she attended Paul R. Wharton High School. After playing center back in her youth, DeLisle switched positions to goalkeeper due to her lack of speed and the opportunity to make diving plays. A former multi-sport athlete, DeLisle played varsity soccer, volleyball, and flag football in high school before dedicating herself completely to soccer at age sixteen. She won MVP honors in her sophomore year and was a team captain in her last two years at Wharton. DeLisle also was part of the all-state team as a Junior and twice named to the all-conference first team. She completed her high school career with 76 appearances and as the record-holder in saves. Outside of school, DeLisle also played club soccer for the West Florida Flames.

== College career ==
DeLisle played college soccer for the UCF Knights. After redshirting her freshman year, she rose to a starting position following the departure of starter Vera Varis. In both 2021 and 2022, DeLisle was named the AAC goalkeeper of the year and was recognized on the all-conference first team. In 2022, she was the starting goalkeeper for UCF as the team advanced to the NCAA tournament. She saved two penalty kicks in a first-round shootout against NC State, helping the team progress to the next stage of the competition, where they faced eventual champions UCLA; DeLisle made several saves during the game before UCF were eventually defeated in the ensuing penalty shootout. In her final year with the Knights, DeLisle became the program record holder in shutouts, tallying a total of 31 over her five seasons of soccer. She left the program having played in 77 games and named as the conference goalkeeper of the week on 8 different occasions.

== Club career ==
=== San Diego Wave ===
After her final year of college eligibility, DeLisle registered for the 2024 NWSL Draft but was ultimately not selected. Instead, she trained as a non-rostered invitee with San Diego Wave FC in the 2024 preseason. After spending several months with the Wave, DeLisle signed a short-term national team replacement contract on July 18. She did not make any appearances with San Diego before she was released on August 9.

=== IFK Norrköping ===
In September 2024, DeLisle signed with IFK Norrköping in the Damallsvenskan. With former Norrköping goalkeeper Emma Lind having departed during the summer, DeLisle quickly began to compete for minutes. She made her professional debut on September 23, 2024, in a 2–2 draw with Djurgårdens IF. She then proceeded to start five more Damallsvenskan matches in a row, taking her total number of appearances in her first season with Norrköping to 6.

In her second season in Sweden, DeLisle split playing time in goal with teammate Sofia Hjern. She made 13 Damallsvenskan appearances and recorded four clean sheets. On November 6, 2025, the club announced that DeLisle would be departing from the team upon the expiration of her contract.

=== Houston Dash ===
On January 22, 2026, DeLisle was announced to have returned stateside to the National Women's Soccer League, signing a one-year contract with the Houston Dash. She made her NWSL debut on May 20, 2026, coming on as a second-half substitute for injured starter Jane Campbell in a draw with DeLisle's former club, the San Diego Wave. The following match, she started in place of Campbell and helped the Dash beat Angel City FC, 2–1, for her only other appearance of the year.

== Career statistics ==
=== Club ===
As of November 8, 2026

Appearances and goals by club, season and competition
Club	Season	League			Cup (Note: Includes the Svenska Cupen)		Playoffs (Note: Includes NWSL Playoffs)		Other		Total	
Club	Season	Division	Apps	Goals	Apps	Goals	Apps	Goals	Apps	Goals	Apps	Goals
San Diego Wave FC	2024	NWSL	0	0	0	0	—		0 (Note: Includes the NWSL x Liga MX Femenil Summer Cup)	0	0	0
IFK Norrköping	2024	Damallsvenskan	6	0	3	0	—		—		9	0
IFK Norrköping	2025	Damallsvenskan	13	0	0	0	—		—		13	0
IFK Norrköping	Total		19	0	3	0	0	0	0	0	22	0
Houston Dash	2026	NWSL	2	0	—		—		—		2	0
Career total			21	0	3	0	0	0	0	0	24	0
