= Houston Dash =

American professional soccer club

- Founded: December 11, 2013; 12 years ago
- Stadium: Shell Energy Stadium; Houston, Texas
- Capacity: 20,656
- Majority owner: Ted Segal
- President: Jessica O'Neill
- General Manager: Angela Hucles Mangano
- Coach: Seb Hines
- League: National Women's Soccer League
- 2026: Regular season: 12th of 16; Playoffs: DNQ
- Website: houstondynamofc.com/houstondash
| Home colors | Away colors | Third colors |

The Houston Dash are an American professional soccer team based in Houston that competes in the National Women's Soccer League (NWSL). The Dash began play in the 2014 season. The team plays its home games at Shell Energy Stadium.

== History ==
=== Establishment ===
On November 19, 2013, MLS team Houston Dynamo began the initial stages of bringing a top flight women's professional soccer franchise to Houston. A week later, the effort was bolstered when the Dynamo began accepting refundable deposits for a potential NWSL expansion team. On December 11, 2013, the National Women's Soccer League awarded the Houston Dynamo and the city of Houston an expansion franchise.

=== Team name, crest, and colors ===
Former logo used from 2013 to 2020.

During a press conference on December 12, 2013, then-Houston Dynamo president Chris Canetti announced that the club would be named the Houston Dash and would share similar colors to the Dynamo: orange, black, and sky blue. The crest featured a soccer ball along with the words "Houston Dash" with sky blue lines in the background. The name Dash refers to the fast running speed of a horse, which was a historical mode of transportation for Texans in the 1800s.

=== Mascot ===
In 2007, Houston started a search for a mascot by asking members of The Art Institute of Houston to submit drawings, from which several finalists were selected and an official mascot would be decided through an online poll, both for the mascot design and name. The winning design, by Eric Hulsey and Leslie Lopez, was of an orange-haired fox and named Dynamo Diesel. He was unveiled at Houston Zoo on April 3, 2007. Dynamo Diesel began working alongside the Houston Dynamo marketing and community outreach programs.

Diesel also became the official mascot of the Houston Dash when the team began play in 2014. Dash Diesel is present at every Houston Dash match and brings an electric energy to the gameday atmosphere at Shell Energy Stadium.

== Ownership and team management ==
Houston Dash is owned by the same ownership group as Houston Dynamo FC, including majority owner Ted Segal and minority owner and current NBA Player James Harden. Former United States men's national soccer team goalkeeperTim Howard joined the ownership as a minority owner on July 16, 2024.

On December 23, 2013, Former Houston Dynamo player Brian Ching was named managing director, in charge of day-to-day operations on both the business and technical sides of under the supervision of then-Houston Dash and Dynamo team president Chris Canetti.

On January 3, 2014, Randy Waldrum was named as the Dash's first head coach, having previously coached the Notre Dame Fighting Irish women's soccer team to two national titles since joining the team in 1999.

On May 29, 2017, Waldrum and Houston Dash agreed to part ways. Assistant coach Omar Morales was named interim coach.

On November 27, 2017, Vera Pauw was hired as the new head coach. On September 20, 2018, Pauw departed from the club.

On December 11, 2018, James Clarkson was hired as the new head coach.

Ted Segal completed the acquisition of the Houston Dynamo FC and Houston Dash on June 22, 2021. The deal was reportedly worth $400 million. Since acquiring the team, Segal has invested significantly into the club, both the Dynamo and Dash and Shell Energy Stadium.

One of Segal's first changes as the new majority owner of the Dash to was bring in more dedicated staff focused on elevating the Dash. On February 2, 2022, the Segal and Dash announced the hiring of Jessica O'Neill as the team's first president, a role tasked with increasing revenue and serving as the team's spokesperson to the NWSL on league matters.

On April 26, 2022, the NWSL and NWSLPA recommended coach James Clarkson should be suspended while they conducted "an investigation into alleged violations of the NWSL Policy to Prevent and Eliminate Workplace Discrimination, Harassment, and Bullying". On April 27, 2022, the Houston Dash announced that it was immediately suspending James Clarkson pending the conclusion of the joint investigation by the NWSL and NWSLPA that was launched in 2021.

On April 29, 2022, the Houston Dash announced that Sarah Lowdon would serve as the acting head coach while the club conducted its search for an interim head coach. On June 15, 2022, the Dash named former Real Betis Féminas and Tottenham Hotspur coach Juan Carlos Amorós as its interim head coach. Lowdon continued as acting head coach pending Amorós's visa approval.

Houston Dash named former NWSL player and sports executive Alex Singer as the General Manager on August 24, 2022. Singer began her managerial duties on September 6 and was brought in to oversee all soccer operations including player personnel and roster management for the team and work closely with the coaching staff to build and construct the roster. She was fired on July 25, 2024, after the team had secured only three wins in sixteen matches during the 2024 season.

On August 25, 2022, the Dash announced that majority owner Ted Segal bought out the stakes of minority owners Gabriel Brener, Oscar De La Hoya, and Ben Guill.

On December 14, 2022, the Dash released a public statement declaring the club would not renew the contract with James Clarkson, which had an expiration date of the end of 2022, after reports concluded that his "actions constituted emotional misconduct." Sam Laity was hired as the next head coach on December 21, 2022, and fired on September 6, 2023.

Fran Alonso was appointed the head coach of the Dash on December 22, 2023 following an extensive search led by general manager, Alex Singer. Alonso joined Houston after being at the helm Celtic FC Women, who compete in the Scottish Women's Premier League (SWPL). While with Celtic, Alonso led the team to a 76-11-9 (WLD) record in the league and won three of the four cup competitions the team competed in. Alonso began a leave of absence on June 28, and was later replaced by interim coach Ricky Clarke in lieu of returning to the club.

Segal's commitment to continuing to grow the Houston Dash was once again evident at the start of 2024 when the club announced on March 14, 2024, the addition of Pablo Pinones Arce as the club's first Technical Director in team history. Pinones Arce was brought in to work alongside general manager Alex Singer and to establish a robust soccer operation framework for the Dash. His responsibilities include talent identification, roster construction, overseeing various aspects of soccer operations, and contributing to the development of a comprehensive youth strategy.

Houston Dynamo Football Club announced the addition of former United States men's national soccer team goalkeeper Tim Howard to its ownership group on July 16, 2024. Howard said joining the HDFC ownership grants him the opportunity to "further contribute to the growth of the game in the United States and connect with the passionate soccer fans who call Houston home”.

On December 9, 2024, the Houston Dash announced Angela Hucles Mangano as President of Women’s Soccer and Chief Soccer Officer for the team. Hucles Mangano was previously the General Manager for Angel City FC.

On January 3, 2025, the Dash then announced Fabrice Gautrat as the team's new head coach, their tenth overall. Gautrat spent the 2023 and 2024 NWSL seasons as an assistant coach at the North Carolina Courage. On September 13, 2026, the Dash announced Gautrat's firing (along with Twila Kilgore as technical director); Jaime Frias was appointed as interim head coach for the rest of the season.

On November 17, 2026, following the end of the 2026 Houston Dash season, the Dash announced the hiring of former Orlando Pride head coach Seb Hines as the club's new permanent head coach.

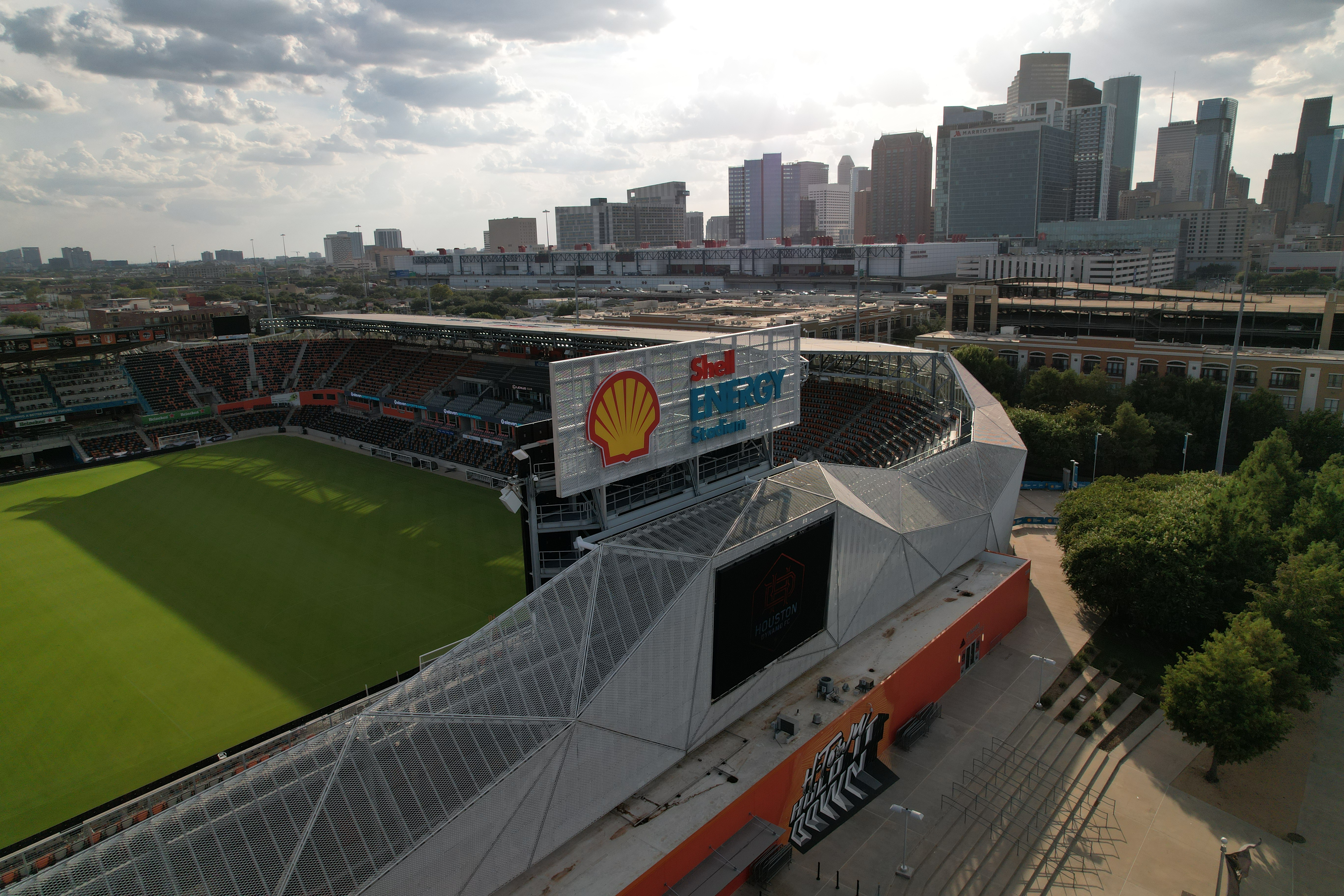
Shell Energy Stadium is the current home of the Houston Dash and Dynamo.

== Shell Energy Stadium ==
The Dash play their games at Shell Energy Stadium, formerly known as BBVA Stadium, which opened in May 2012, and features a 20,656-seat capacity. For the team's inaugural season, 7,000 seats in the lower seating bowl are available for home games. When the stadium opened in 2012, it became the first soccer-specific stadium in Major League Soccer located in a city's downtown district.

On June 22, 2022, Houston Dynamo Football Club (HDFC) announced plans for major upgrades to Shell Energy Stadium. The renovation project began immediately following the conclusion of the 2022 MLS and NWSL seasons and was ready in time for the 2023 season. The project was headlined by the installation of all-new mesh seats throughout the entire seating bowl and made Shell Energy Stadium the first soccer-specific stadium in America with mesh seating throughout the building. A portion of the east side of the stadium was reconfigured to create a new club area. The East Club, includes the three centermost sections of the east sideline lower level and hold a capacity of 824 guests.

The East Club features nine loge boxes, which offer individuals and companies the opportunity to entertain guests.

Aside from Major League Soccer, National Women's Soccer League and international soccer matches, the stadium also hosts Texas Southern University football, concerts, and much more. With its downtown location, the stadium is now a part of a true Stadium District, which features Minute Maid Park and Toyota Center, as well as other amenities and attractions such as the George R. Brown Convention Center, the Hilton Americas, Discovery Green, and Houston Pavilions.

On June 13, 2019, it was announced that BBVA Compass Stadium was changing its name to BBVA Stadium following the sponsor's rebrand.

During the second half of the 2021 season, BBVA Stadium was rebranded as PNC Stadium following PNC Financial Services' acquisition of BBVA USA in June 2021.

On January 17, 2023, PNC Stadium became Shell Energy Stadium following Shell Energy and the Dynamo agreeing on a stadium naming rights deal reportedly worth $40 million over 8 years.

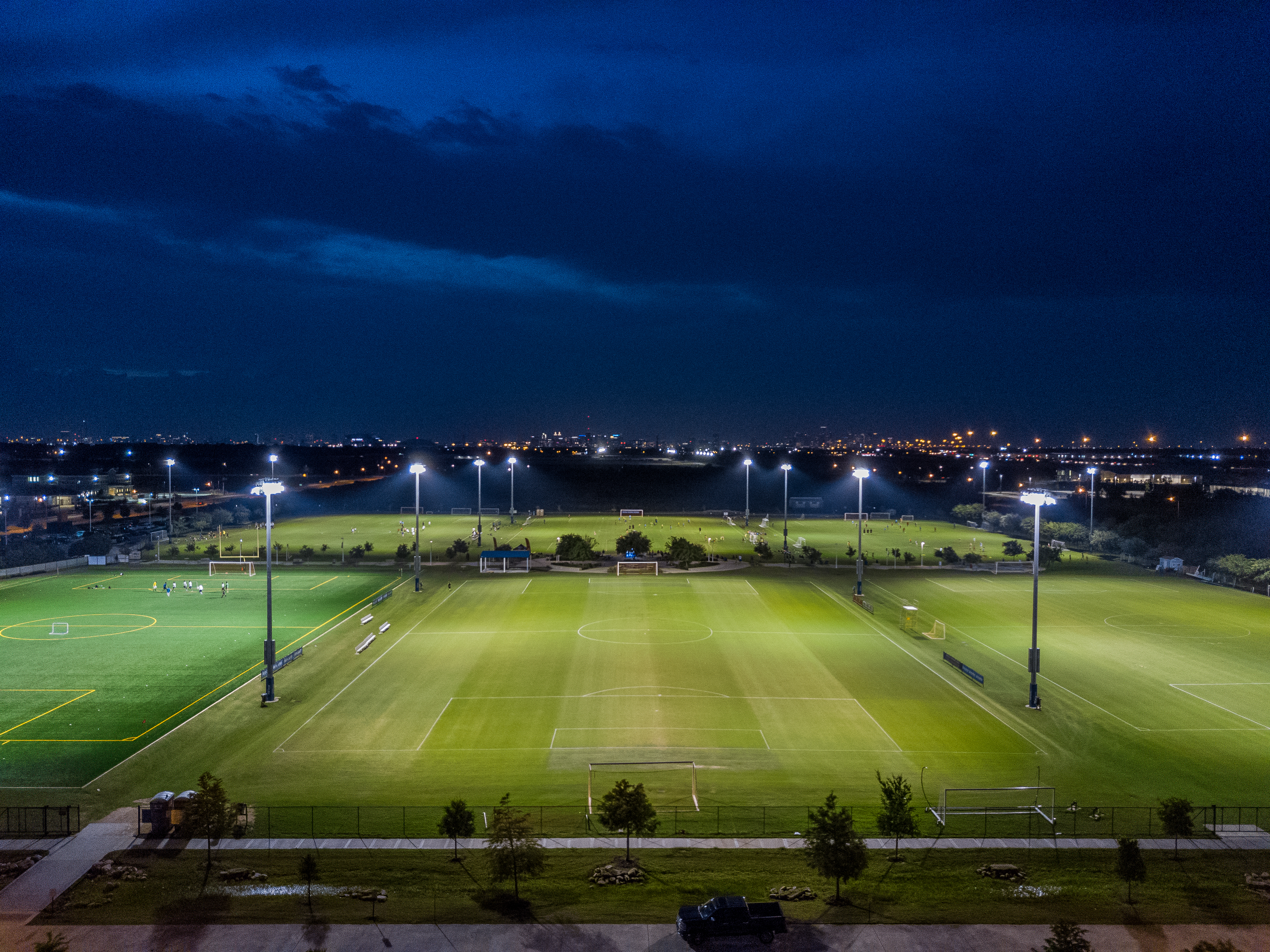
Houston Sports Park is the official training facility of the Houston Dash.

=== Houston Sports Park ===
The training facility for Houston Dynamo FC, Houston Dash and academy teams is located at the Houston Sports Park (HSP). Opened in 2011, the complex features seven soccer fields, field lighting, and parking. All of the fields feature Bermuda grass, except one that contains FieldTurf. Four fields are reserved exclusively for use by the Dynamo, Dash and visiting professional teams. The remaining fields are available for public rental. The training facility is located 10 miles south of Shell Energy Stadium and was built through a partnership with the City of Houston.

== Players and staff ==
=== Current squad ===
As of November 1, 2026

| No. | Pos. | Nation | Player |
|---|---|---|---|
| 1 | GK | USA | Jane Campbell (Captain) |
| 2 | DF | CAN | Allysha Chapman |
| 4 | DF | USA | Leah Klenke |
| 6 | FW | USA | Messiah Bright |
| 7 | MF | SWE | Evelina Duljan |
| 8 | DF | USA | Natalie Hammond |
| 9 | FW | CAN | Clarissa Larisey |
| 10 | DF | USA | Malia Berkely |
| 12 | MF | JAM | Kiki Van Zanten |
| 13 | MF | CAN | Sophie Schmidt |
| 14 | DF | USA | Paige Nielsen |
| 15 | FW | USA | Avery Patterson |
| 16 | FW | CAN | Amanda West |
| 17 | MF | AUT | Sarah Puntigam |
| 18 | DF | USA | Cate Hardin |
| 19 | MF | USA | Maggie Graham |
| 21 | GK | USA | Hillary Beall |
| 22 | FW | USA | Kat Rader |
| 23 | FW | USA | Kate Faasse |
| 24 | MF | USA | Danielle Colaprico |
| 25 | FW | USA | Makenzy Robbe |
| 27 | DF | ITA | Lisa Boattin |
| 30 | MF | USA | Linda Ullmark |
| 34 | FW | USA | Khyah Harper |
| 40 | GK | USA | Caroline DeLisle |
| 47 | FW | SRB | Miljana Ivanović |
| 99 | DF | USA | Jordan Brewster |

==== Out on loan ====
| No. | Pos. | Nation | Player |
|---|---|---|---|
| 3 | GK | USA | Liz Beardsley (at Tampa Bay Sun FC until December 31, 2026) |
| 29 | DF | BRA | Rebeca Costa da Silva (at Dux Logroño until June 30, 2027) |
| 33 | DF | USA | Jyllissa Harris (at Ottawa Rapid FC until December 31, 2026) |

For details of former players, see Category:Houston Dash players and List of Houston Dash players.

=== Staff ===
As of November 17, 2026

Executive
| Majority Owner & Chairman | Ted Segal |
| Vice Chairman | Lyle Ayes |
| Minority Owner | James Harden |
| Minority Owner | Tim Howard |
| President of Women's Soccer | Angela Hucles Mangano |
| Assistant General Manager | Jason Lowe |
| Technical Director | Vacant |
Technical
| Head Coach | (England) Seb Hines |
| Assistant Coach | (United States) Jaime Frias |
| Assistant Coach | (United States) Oscar Rivero |
| Goalkeeping Coach | (United States) Matt Pickens |
| Assistant Goalkeeping Coach | (United States) Megan Kinneman |
| Player Development Coach | (United States) Marina Schachowskoj |
| Director of Recruitment & Analytics | Michael Poma |
| Recruitment Analyst | Adelaide Gilley |
| Data and Video Analyst | Chloe Dhillon |
| Head of Performance | Bethan Lloyd |
| Recruitment Analyst | (United States) Adelaide Gilley |
| Performance Coach | (United States) Jeffery Duarte |
| Applied Sport Scientist | (United States) Ariana Dinberg |
| Medical Director | (United States) Wafaa Chatila |
| Head Athletic Trainer | (United States) Matthew Hutton |
| Assistant Athletic Trainer | (United States) Jill Davis |
| Physical Therapist | (United States) Dorcas Copa |
| Team Dietician | (United States) Bianca Paulus |
| Dietician Fellow | (United States) Hannah Mitroff |
| Head of Equipment | (United States) Matthew Hickman |
| Equipment Manager | (United States) Gina Monaco |
| Equipment Coordinator | (United States) Paloma Paez |
| Director of Operations & Player Experience | (United States) Jessie Vilkofsky |
| Player Care Coordinator | (Mexico) Emily Perez Velez |
| Team Administrator | (United States) Claire Quaasdorff |
| Security Manager | (United States) Martha Sanchez |

=== Head coach history ===
| Name | Tenure |
|---|---|
| Randy Waldrum | January 3, 2014 – May 29, 2017 |
| Omar Morales (interim) | May 29, 2017 – November 27, 2017 |
| Vera Pauw | November 27, 2017 – September 20, 2018 |
| James Clarkson | December 11, 2018 – April 26, 2022 |
| Sarah Lowdon (acting) | April 29, 2022 – July 12, 2022 |
| Juan Carlos Amorós (interim) | July 12, 2022 – October 28, 2022 |
| Sam Laity | December 21, 2022 – September 6, 2023 |
| Sarah Lowdon (interim) | September 6, 2023 – December 4, 2023 |
| Fran Alonso | December 22, 2023 – October 1, 2024 |
| Ricky Clarke (interim) | October 1, 2024 – December 4, 2024 |
| Fabrice Gautrat | January 3, 2025 – September 13, 2026 |
| Jaime Frias (interim) | September 13, 2026 – November 17, 2026 |
| Seb Hines | November 17, 2026 – present |

== Records ==
=== Year-by-year ===
As of November 1, 2026

| Season | NWSL regular season | | | | | | | Position | NWSL Playoffs | NWSL Challenge Cup | Femenil Summer Cup |
| Season | P | W | L | D | GF | GA | Pts | Position | NWSL Playoffs | NWSL Challenge Cup | Femenil Summer Cup |
|---|---|---|---|---|---|---|---|---|---|---|---|
| 2014 | 24 | 5 | 16 | 3 | 23 | 44 | 18 | 9th | DNQ | – | — |
| 2015 | 20 | 6 | 8 | 6 | 21 | 26 | 24 | 5th | DNQ | – | — |
| 2016 | 20 | 6 | 10 | 4 | 29 | 29 | 22 | 8th | DNQ | – | — |
| 2017 | 24 | 7 | 14 | 3 | 23 | 39 | 24 | 8th | DNQ | – | — |
| 2018 | 24 | 9 | 10 | 5 | 35 | 39 | 32 | 6th | DNQ | – | — |
| 2019 | 24 | 7 | 12 | 5 | 21 | 36 | 26 | 7th | DNQ | – | — |
| 2020 | 4 | 3 | 1 | 0 | 12 | 7 | 9 | Community Shield | Cancelled | Champions | — |
| 2021 | 24 | 9 | 10 | 5 | 21 | 31 | 32 | 7th | DNQ | Group Stage | — |
| 2022 | 22 | 10 | 6 | 6 | 35 | 27 | 36 | 4th | First Round | Group Stage | — |
| 2023 | 22 | 6 | 8 | 8 | 16 | 18 | 26 | 10th | DNQ | Group Stage | — |
| 2024 | 24 | 5 | 14 | 5 | 17 | 37 | 21 | 14th | DNQ | DNP | Group Stage |
| 2025 | 26 | 8 | 12 | 6 | 26 | 42 | 30 | 10th | DNQ | DNP | |
| 2026 | 30 | 9 | 15 | 6 | 38 | 44 | 33 | 12th | DNQ | DNP | – |
| Overall | 288 | 90 | 136 | 62 | 317 | 419 | – | – | – | – | – |

Notes

- **DNQ** = Did not qualify
- **DNP** = Did not participate

=== Team records ===
As of November 2, 2026. Current players in bold. Statistics are updated once a year after the conclusion of the NWSL season.

Most appearances
| Player | | | | | Appearances | | | | |
| # | Name | Nat. | Pos. | Dash career | NWSL | Playoffs | Cup | Other | Total |
|---|---|---|---|---|---|---|---|---|---|
| 1 | **Jane Campbell** | (United States) | GK | 2017– | 197 | 1 | 19 | 4 | 221 |
| 2 | **Sophie Schmidt** | (Canada) | MF | 2019– | 121 | 1 | 17 | 7 | 146 |
| 3 | **Allysha Chapman** | (Canada) | DF | 2015–2016, 2018– | 123 | 0 | 16 | 5 | 144 |
| 4 | Rachel Daly | (England) | FW | 2016–2022 | 101 | 0 | 15 | 0 | 116 |
| 5 | Kealia Ohai | (United States) | FW | 2014–2019 | 114 | 0 | 0 | 0 | 114 |
| 6 | Nichelle Prince | (Canada) | FW | 2017–2023 | 88 | 1 | 14 | 4 | 107 |
| 7 | Katie Lind | (United States) | DF | 2020–2025 | 79 | 1 | 21 | 4 | 105 |
| 8 | Haley Hanson | (United States) | MF | 2018–2022 | 80 | 0 | 16 | 4 | 100 |
| 9 | Amber Brooks | (United States) | DF | 2016–2019 | 91 | 0 | 0 | 0 | 91 |
| 10 | Ally Prisock | (United States) | DF | 2019–2023 | 69 | 1 | 15 | 4 | 89 |

Top goalscorers
| Player | | | | | Appearances | | | | |
| # | Name | Nat. | Pos. | Dash career | NWSL | Playoffs | Cup | Other | Total |
|---|---|---|---|---|---|---|---|---|---|
| 1 | Rachel Daly | (England) | FW | 2016–2022 | 37 | 0 | 5 | 0 | 42 |
| 2 | Kealia Ohai | (United States) | FW | 2014–2019 | 28 | 0 | 0 | 0 | 28 |
| 3 | Kristie Mewis | (United States) | MF | 2017–2021 | 9 | 0 | 3 | 2 | 14 |
| 3 | Nichelle Prince | (Canada) | FW | 2017–2023 | 12 | 0 | 1 | 1 | 14 |
| 5 | Shea Groom | (United States) | DF | 2020–2023 | 4 | 0 | 5 | 3 | 12 |
| 6 | Carli Lloyd | (United States) | FW | 2015–2017 | 11 | 0 | 0 | 0 | 11 |
| 6 | Diana Ordóñez | (United States) | MF | 2023–2025 | 8 | 0 | 1 | 2 | 11 |
| 6 | Ebony Salmon | (United States) | FW | 2022–2023 | 10 | 0 | 1 | 0 | 11 |
| 9 | Sofia Huerta | (United States) | MF | 2018–2019 | 10 | 0 | 0 | 0 | 10 |
| 9 | Veronica Latsko | (United States) | FW | 2018–2021 | 7 | 0 | 0 | 3 | 10 |
| 9 | **Kat Rader** | (United States) | FW | 2026– | 10 | 0 | 0 | 0 | 10 |
| 9 | **Sophie Schmidt** | (Canada) | MF | 2019– | 5 | 1 | 1 | 3 | 10 |

== Honors ==
- NWSL Challenge Cup
  - Winners: 2020
- NWSL Community Shield
  - Runners-up: 2020

== Broadcasting ==
During the 2014 season, games were broadcast locally on CSN TV in Houston. It was the second local television broadcast agreement in the NWSL's history. On August 6, 2014, DirecTV and AT&T proposed a reorganization plan, in which it would acquire CSN Houston in a 60/40 joint venture. At the time, AT&T was in the process of acquiring DirecTV, pending regulatory approval. The reorganization offer was approved by the court on October 30, 2014, although Comcast appealed the decision in order to address a $100 million loan that had been given to the network. Attorneys from the companies involved reached an agreement to allow the deal to continue through Comcast's appeals process. The Rockets' general counsel Rafael Stone stated that the approval gave a "clear path" for the network to return to full-time service in November, and transition to DirecTV's Root Sports brand, and the network subsequently canceled all of its existing studio shows on October 22, 2014. Select Houston Dash matches continued to be aired on Root Sports through the 2015 and 2016 seasons.

As of the 2017 season, Dash games were streamed exclusively by Go90 for American audiences and via the NWSL website for international viewers. As part of a three-year agreement with A&E Networks, Lifetime broadcasts one NWSL Game of the Week on Saturday afternoons. For the 2017 season, the Dash were featured in five nationally broadcast Lifetime NWSL Game of the Week broadcasts on May 6, May 3, and September 23, 2017.

In July 2022, the club announced plans to broadcast matches locally on AT&T SportsNet Southwest (rebranded to Space City Home Network as of October 2023), the team's first local agreement since 2016.

On November 9, 2023, the National Women's Soccer League announced landmark agreements for its domestic media distribution with 118 national windows on CBS Sports, ESPN, Prime Video and Scripps Sports. The four-year contract with each partner will generate record-breaking distribution and revenue for the league while maximizing a mix of linear and digital streaming distribution.

Houston Dash and Houston-based PTS Media announced on April 12, 2024, that all remaining home matches for the 2024 season would stream in Spanish across the Deportes Nation digital platforms. The agreement marked the first time that Dash matches would be available to fans in Spanish. Coverage includes a 30-minute pregame show plus a 30-minute postgame show that will feature Dash players and staff.

On April 25, 2024, Houston Dash and Space City Home Network (SCHN) announced a broadcast agreement that brought select Dash matches to the local network during the 2024 season and marked the third consecutive year in which the Dash has prioritized providing local broadcast options through the network.

== See also ==
- List of top-division football clubs in CONCACAF countries
- List of professional sports teams in the United States and Canada
