= Emma Lind =

Swedish footballer (born 1995)

Personal information
- Full name: Malin Emma Kristin Lind
- Date of birth: 21 July 1995 (age 31)
- Place of birth: Vadstena, Sweden
- Position: Goalkeeper

Team information
- Current team: IFK Norrköping

Emma Lind (born 21 July 1995) is a Swedish footballer who plays as a goalkeeper for IFK Norrköping.

== Honours ==
AS Roma

- Serie A: 2022–23
