= Linda Ullmark =

American soccer player (born 2006)

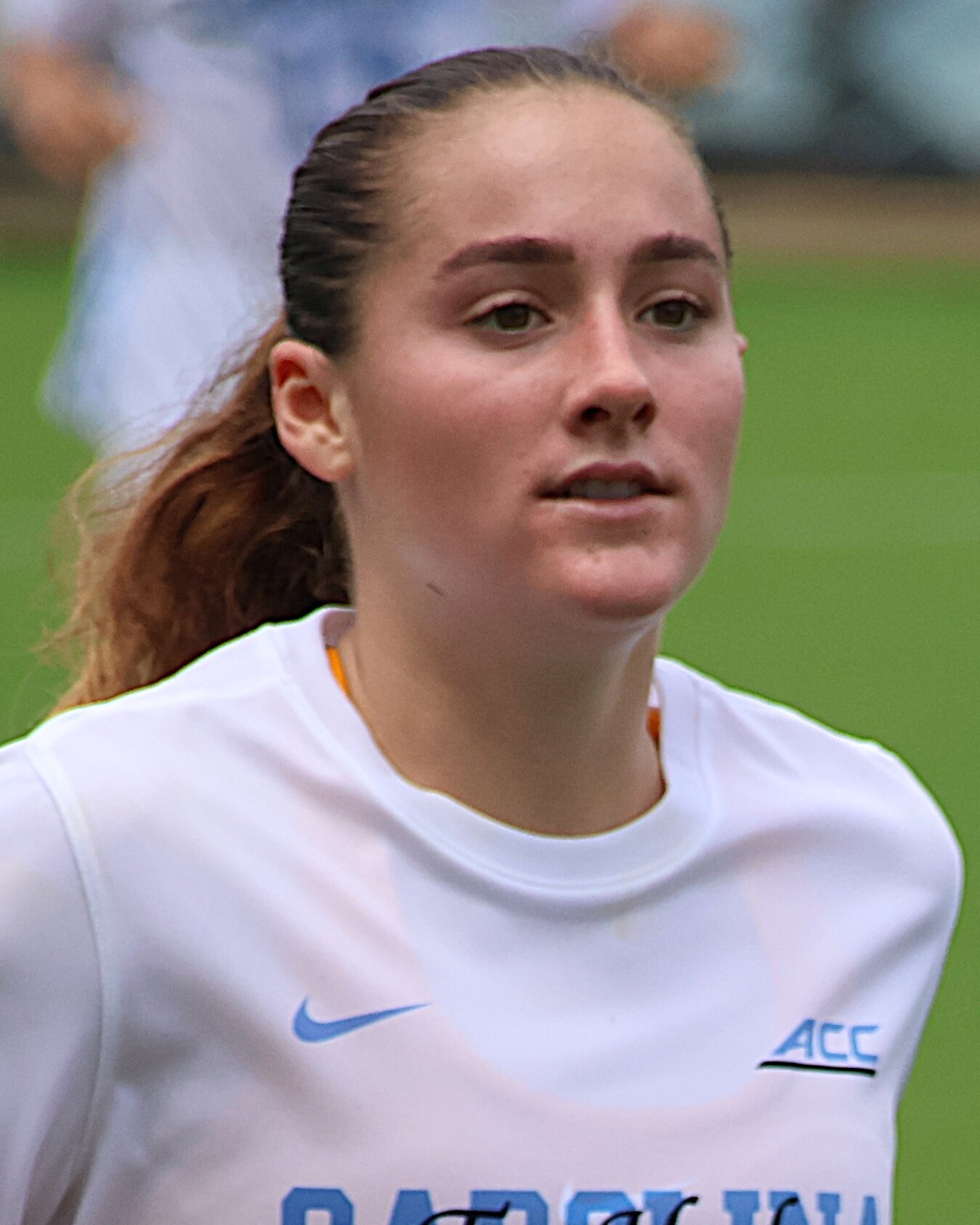
- Ullmark with North Carolina in 2025

Personal information
- Full name: Linda Helena Jade Ullmark
- Date of birth: April 21, 2006 (age 20)
- Place of birth: San Diego, California, United States
- Height: 5 ft 5 in (1.65 m)
- Position: Attacking midfielder

Team information
- Current team: Houston Dash
- Number: 30

Youth career
- Western New York Flash

College career
Years	Team	Apps	(Gls)
2024–2025	North Carolina Tar Heels	48	(13)

Senior career*
Years	Team	Apps	(Gls)
2024–2025	FC Buffalo	5	(4)
2026–	Houston Dash	26	(3)

International career^{‡}
2024	United States U-19	1	(0)
2025–	United States U-20	11	(7)
- * Club domestic league appearances and goals as of 03:18, November 8, 2026 (UTC) ‡ National team caps and goals as of September 16, 2026

Linda Helena Jade Ullmark (born April 21, 2006) is an American professional soccer player who plays as an attacking midfielder for the Houston Dash of the National Women's Soccer League (NWSL). She played college soccer for the North Carolina Tar Heels, winning the 2024 national championship and earning All-American honors in 2025.

== Early life ==
Ullmark was born in San Diego, California, the daughter of Jamie and William Ullmark. When she was two, her family moved to Okinawa, Japan, where her father was stationed with the United States Marine Corps for ten years. She later moved to Buffalo, New York, and attended the Nichols School, where she played on the soccer, lacrosse, basketball, and squash teams. She was named the New York Girls' Soccer Gatorade Player of the Year as a junior after scoring 42 goals in 16 games in 2022. She played club soccer for the Western New York Flash, earning multiple ECNL all-conference honors. She also played for FC Buffalo in the USL W League. She committed to North Carolina after being recruited by Damon Nahas over other offers including Harvard and Florida State.

== College career ==
Ullmark was the only freshman to start all 27 games for the North Carolina Tar Heels in 2024. She had a breakout performance against Virginia, scoring her first two career goals and assisting Kate Faasse in the 3–2 victory. In the ACC tournament semifinals, she equalized from long range in a 2–1 come-from-behind win over rivals Duke. In the NCAA tournament, she scored three goals in the first three rounds and was named in the all-tournament team after North Carolina won its 23rd national title and first since 2012. She finished her freshman season with 6 goals and 5 assists and was named to the ACC all-freshman team and TopDrawerSoccer first-team Freshman Best XI.

Ullmark scored 7 goals and led the team with 8 assists in 21 games as a sophomore in 2025, earning third-team All-ACC and fourth-team All-American honors. Unseeded in the NCAA tournament, the team went to the third round before losing to TCU on penalties. After two seasons, she decided to go professional and give up her remaining college eligibility.

== Club career ==
Ullmark with the Houston Dash in 2026

The Houston Dash announced on January 13, 2026, that they had signed Ullmark to her first professional contract on a four-year deal. She made her professional debut in the season opener, starting in a 1–0 win over the San Diego Wave. On July 12, she scored her first professional goal and added an assist in a 2–2 draw with expansion team Denver Summit. She scored the late 1–0 winner against Bay FC two weeks later and was named NWSL Rookie of the Month after recording two goals and two assists in July.

== International career ==
Ullmark was called up to the United States youth national team at the under-17 level in 2023. She played in a friendly for the under-19 team against Spain in 2024. She made her under-20 debut at the 2025 CONCACAF Women's U-20 Championship, scoring two goals with two assists in four games and being named in the tournament's Best XI. She started all four matches for the under-20s at the 2026 FIFA U-20 Women's World Cup in Poland, providing a goal and two assists. Brazil eliminated the United States on penalties in the round of 16.

== Honors and awards ==
North Carolina Tar Heels

- NCAA Division I women's soccer tournament: 2024

Individual

- NWSL Rookie of the Month: July 2026
- Fourth-team All-American: 2025
- Third-team All-ACC: 2025
- ACC all-freshman team: 2024
- NCAA tournament all-tournament team: 2024
- ACC tournament all-tournament team: 2024
- CONCACAF Women's U-20 Championship Best XI: 2025
