= Fabrice Gautrat =

American soccer coach (born 1987)

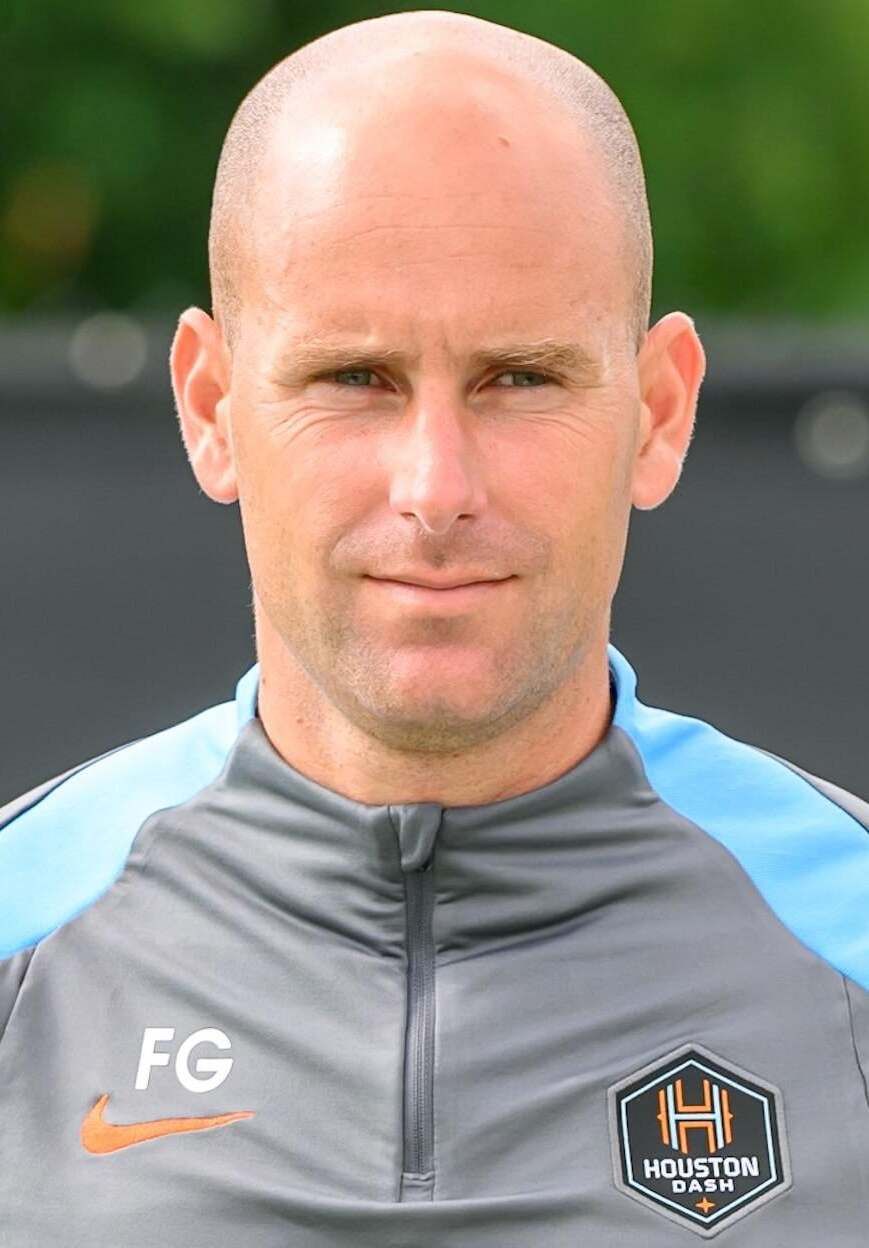
- Gautrat with the Houston Dash in 2025

Personal information
- Date of birth: November 4, 1987 (age 38)
- Place of birth: Santa Clarita, California, U.S.
- Height: 6 ft 1 in (1.85 m)
- Position: Defender

Youth career
- –2006: Hart Hawks

College career
Years	Team	Apps	(Gls)
2006–2007	San Diego Toreros	20	(3)
2009–2011	The Master's Mustangs		

Senior career*
Years	Team	Apps	(Gls)
2011	Southern California Seahorses	7	(0)
2011–2013	UJA Maccabi	27	(1)
2014	Orange County Blues	20	(0)
2015	Atlanta Silverbacks	3	(0)

Managerial career
- 2018–2022: Chicago FC United (USDA/Girls Academy)
- 2022: Chicago Red Stars (assistant)
- 2023–2024: North Carolina Courage (assistant)
- 2025–2026: Houston Dash
- * Club domestic league appearances and goals

Fabrice Gautrat (born November 4, 1987) is an American professional soccer coach and former player. He was previously head coach of the Houston Dash, and an assistant coach for the Chicago Red Stars and the North Carolina Courage of the National Women's Soccer League (NWSL).

== Playing career ==
Gautrat was a member of the San Diego Toreros soccer roster in 2006 and 2007. He later played for The Master's Mustangs from 2009 to 2011.

Gautrat spent four years with UJA Maccabi Paris Métropole, one year with Orange County Blues, and one year with the Atlanta Silverbacks FC. He retired at the end of the 2015 season.

== Coaching career ==
In August 2018, Gautrat was named Head Coach of Chicago FC United’s girls program in the U.S. Soccer Development Academy (USDA). He was promoted to Academy Director in February 2020 and led the program through a transition to the Girls Academy league after the USDA folded.

In February 2022, Gautrat was named a full-time assistant coach for the Chicago Red Stars. Gautrat previously served as a part-time assistant coach. In January 2023, he was named as an assistant coach for North Carolina Courage.

Gautrat became the head coach of the Houston Dash in January 2025. He spent one-and-a-half years with the Dash before the Dash announced that he had been removed from his position on September 13, 2026.

== Personal life ==
Gautrat is married to former United States women's national soccer team player Morgan Brian.
