= Miljana Ivanović =

Serbian footballer (born 2000)

- Ivanović with the Houston Dash in 2026

Personal information
- Date of birth: 17 May 2000 (age 26)
- Place of birth: Serbia, FR Yugoslavia
- Height: 1.61 m (5 ft 3 in)
- Position: Forward

Team information
- Current team: Houston Dash
- Number: 47

Senior career*
Years	Team	Apps	(Gls)
2016–2019	SD Vojvodina		
2019	IFK Kalmar		
2019–2021	ŽFK Mašinac		
2021–2023	Arna-Bjørnar	56	(14)
2023–2024	LSK	22	(9)
2024–2025	London City Lionesses	8	(1)
2025–2026	Malmö FF	23	(9)
2026–	Houston Dash	12	(2)

International career^{‡}
2017–	Serbia	24	(7)
- * Club domestic league appearances and goals as of 03:14, 8 November 2026 (UTC) ‡ National team caps and goals as of 22 April 2025

Miljana Ivanović (Serbian Cyrillic: Миљана Ивановић; born 17 May 2000) is a Serbian professional footballer who plays as a forward for the Houston Dash of the National Women's Soccer League (NWSL) and the Serbia national team.

== Club career ==
After starting her career with Vojvodina in Serbia, Ivanović signed with Elitettan club IFK Kalmar in February 2019, but the 18-year-old tore her anterior cruciate ligament (ACL) during preseason in Sweden.

After returning to fitness with ŽFK Mašinac in Serbia, Ivanović joined Toppserien club Arna-Bjørnar in May 2021. She spent two-and-a-half seasons with the Norwegian club, scoring 11 goals in 45 league games.

In August 2023, Ivanović made a midseason transfer to fellow Toppserien club LSK Kvinner, signing a four-year contract. She scored 9 goals in 22 league games during a year with the club.

In July 2024, Ivanović was sold by LSK Kvinner for a club record fee and signed a four-year contract with Women's Championship club London City Lionesses. She scored 1 goal in 8 league appearances as London City won the league, earning promotion to the Women's Super League.

In July 2025, Ivanović was transferred to Damallsvenskan club Malmö FF, signing a three-year contract. She scored 9 goals in 23 league games during a year with the Swedish club.

Ivanović was a record sale for Malmö when she signed a three-year contract with the Houston Dash of the National Women's Soccer League (NWSL) in June 2026.

== International career ==
Ivanović has been capped for the Serbia national team, appearing for the team during the 2019 FIFA Women's World Cup qualifying cycle.

== International goals ==
No.	Date	Venue	Opponent	Score	Result	Competition
1.	24 October 2020	Serbian FA Sports Center, Stara Pazova, Serbia	Kazakhstan	1–0	4–1	UEFA Women's Euro 2022 qualifying
2.	7 April 2022	Serbian FA Sports Center, Stara Pazova, Serbia	Israel	3–0	4–0	2023 FIFA Women's World Cup qualification
3.	26 September 2023	Serbian FA Sports Center, Stara Pazova, Serbia	Greece	1–0	4–0	2023–24 UEFA Women's Nations League
4.	26 September 2023	Serbian FA Sports Center, Stara Pazova, Serbia	Greece	3–0	4–0	2023–24 UEFA Women's Nations League
5.	31 May 2024	Čukarički Stadium, Belgrade, Serbia	Slovakia	2–1	2–1	UEFA Women's Euro 2025 qualifying
6.	4 June 2024	Anton Malatinský Stadium, Trnava, Slovakia	Slovakia	3–0	4–0	UEFA Women's Euro 2025 qualifying
7.	8 April 2025	Stadio Silvio Piola, Novara, Italy	Belarus	2–0	3–0	2025 UEFA Women's Nations League
8.	27 June 2025	Serbian FA Sports Center, Stara Pazova, Serbia	Iceland	1–3	1–3	Friendly

== Honors ==
London City Lionesses

- Women's Championship: 2024–25
