= Sophie Schmidt =

Canadian soccer player (born 1988)

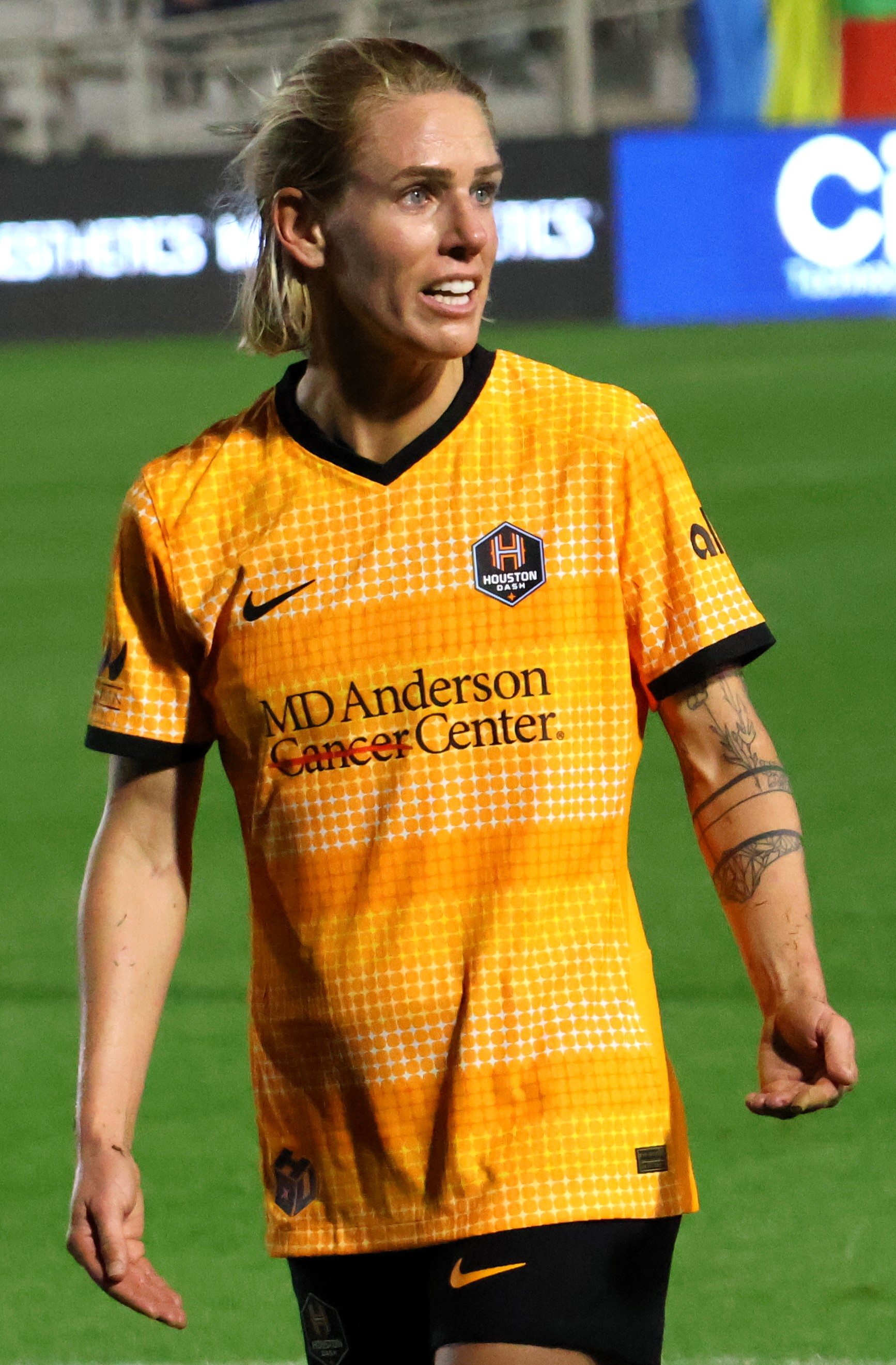
- Schmidt with the Houston Dash in 2024

Personal information
- Full name: Sophie Diana Schmidt
- Date of birth: 28 June 1988 (age 38)
- Place of birth: Winnipeg, Manitoba, Canada
- Height: 1.72 m (5 ft 7 1/2 in)
- Position: Midfielder

Team information
- Current team: Houston Dash
- Number: 13

Youth career
- Abbotsford Rush
- Vancouver Whitecaps
- Surrey United SC

College career
Years	Team	Apps	(Gls)
2007–2010	Portland Pilots	57	(33)

Senior career*
Years	Team	Apps	(Gls)
2005–2010	Vancouver Whitecaps	39	(6)
2011	MagicJack	11	(1)
2012	Kristianstads DFF	6	(0)
2013–2014	Sky Blue FC	41	(8)
2015–2018	FFC Frankfurt	52	(6)
2019–	Houston Dash	121	(5)

International career^{‡}
2004	Canada U19	4	(0)
2006–2008	Canada U20	12	(2)
2005–2023	Canada	226	(20)
Medal record
Women's football
Representing Canada
Olympic Games
Gold medal – first place	2020 Tokyo	Team
Bronze medal – third place	2012 London	Team
Bronze medal – third place	2016 Rio de Janeiro	Team
CONCACAF W Championship
Gold medal – first place	2010 Mexico
Silver medal – second place	2018 United States
Pan American Games
Gold medal – first place	2011 Guadalajara	Team
- * Club domestic league appearances and goals as of 03:18, November 8, 2026 (UTC) ‡ National team caps and goals as of December 5, 2023

Sophie Diana Schmidt (born 28 June 1988) is a Canadian professional soccer player who plays as a midfielder for National Women's Soccer League club Houston Dash. From 2005 until retiring from international football in 2023, she was a member of the Canadian national team, with whom she won an Olympic gold medal in 2020 and bronze in both 2012 and 2016. She previously played her club soccer for German club FFC Frankfurt and Sky Blue FC in the NWSL.

== Early life ==
Schmidt was born in Winnipeg, Manitoba, to Elmer and Cornelia Schmidt. Her parents immigrated to Canada from Paraguay before she was born, while her grandparents were originally from Germany. She speaks German fluently and studied German in Portland, Oregon. She attended W. J. Mouat Secondary School in Abbotsford, British Columbia and played for the Abbotsford Rush club team in 2004. She grew up in a Mennonite community and has described her faith as the most important thing to her.

== College career ==
Schmidt attended the University of Portland and played for the Portland Pilots from 2007 to 2009. She did not play during the 2006 season due to her Canadian national team commitments.

As a second-year student, Schmidt played forward for the Pilots despite having never played the position at a competitive level. She finished the season with seven goals and seven assists in 14 games. Schmidt was fourth in the West Coast Conference in total points (21), sixth in goals and third in assists. She scored the lone goal in a 1–0 NCAA second round win at Colorado. In 2009, Schmidt finished the season tied for first on the team with 12 assists and third on the team with 12 goals. She was named to the Soccer America MVP Team (All-America) First Team, NSCAA First Team All-American, NSCAA All-West Region First Team, and ll-WCC First Team. She ranked ninth in school history for career points per game (1.60) and assists per game (0.46) and tenth in Pilots' history in goals (33) and goals per game (0.58) in 57 matches. She graduated in December 2010 with a Bachelor of Arts in Life Science and German.

== Club career ==
=== Early career ===
Schmidt played for the Vancouver Whitecaps from 2005 to 2006, alongside former Pilots Christine Sinclair and Tiffeny Milbrett. She appeared and started in eight games for the Whitecaps, recording three assists. In 2011, she played for magicJack in the WPS, followed by a short-term contract with Kristianstads DFF in 2012.

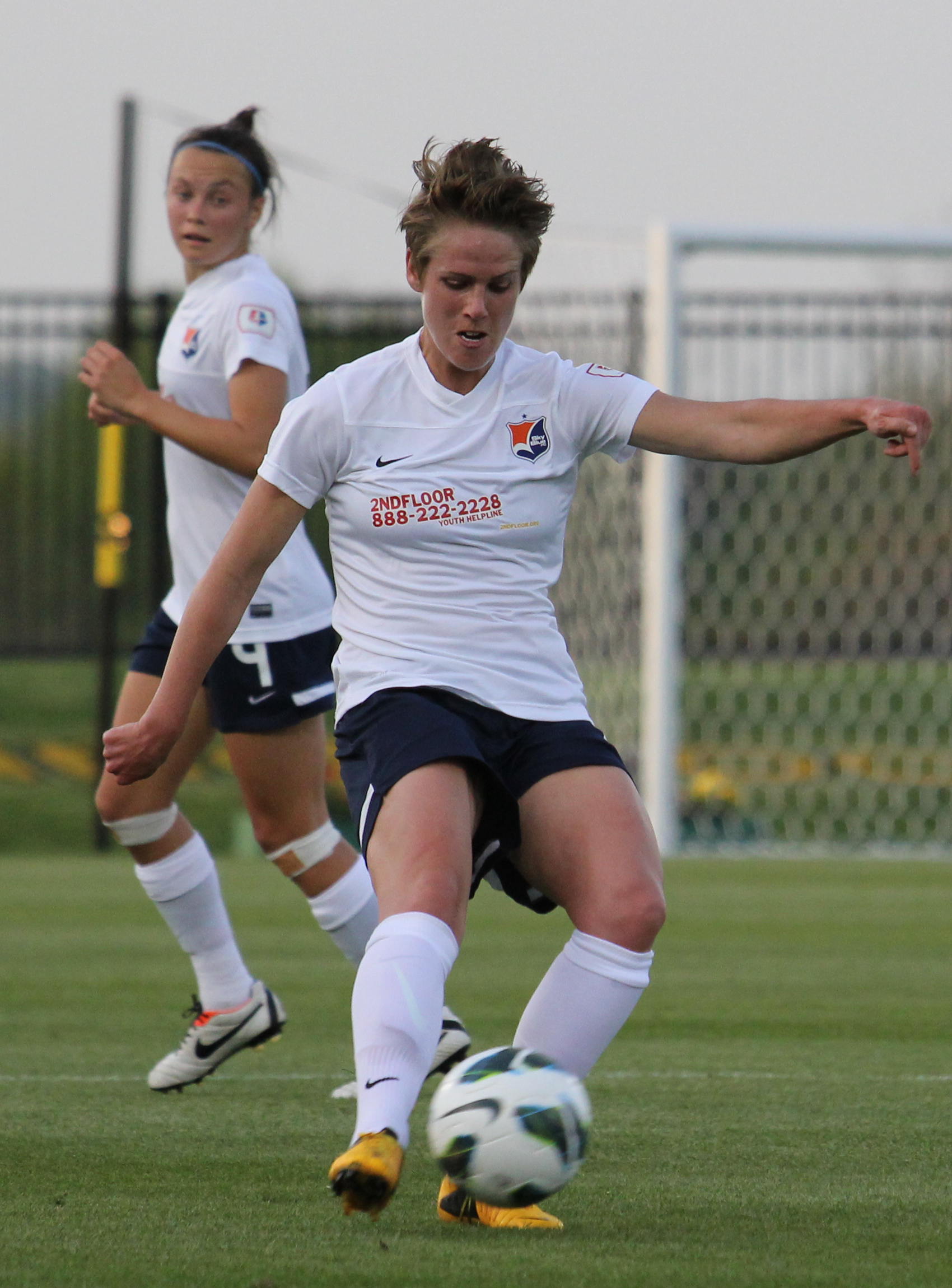
Schmidt playing for Sky Blue FC, 2013

=== Sky Blue FC ===
On 11 January 2013, she joined Sky Blue FC in the new National Women's Soccer League. Schmidt played two seasons with Sky Blue, making 42 appearances and scoring 8 goals.

=== FFC Frankfurt ===
Schmidt signed a one-year deal for German club 1. FFC Frankfurt of the Bundesliga on 31 July 2015. Schmidt left 1. FFC Frankfurt following the 2017–2018 Bundesliga season.

=== Houston Dash ===
Sophie Schmidt with the Houston Dash in 2026

After three seasons with Frankfurt, Schmidt would sign with NWSL club Houston Dash in 2019. She made her debut for the club on April 14, 2019, against Seattle Reign FC. During the 2020 NWSL Challenge Cup Final, she would score a penalty, helping the Dash defeat the Chicago Red Stars for the club's first major trophy. In December 2020, she would re-sign with the Dash through the 2022 season, with the Dash having an option for the 2023 season. In October 2022 she signed a new two-year contract with the Dash, having by then made 70 appearances overall for the club, with General Manager Alex Singer saying "Keeping Sophie with us in Houston was a top priority as she has consistently been one of the most impactful players on our roster". Featuring in a 2–1 victory over the Chicago Red Starsin April 2023, Schmidt made 23 ball recoveries as the Dash earned their first win of 2023. On October 4, 2024, Schmidt signed a two-year contract extension through 2026 , with a mutual option for 2027. On August 8, 2025, she scored the winning goal for Houston in the 95th minute of a 2–1 win over the North Carolina Courage, helping the Dash to break a six-game winless streak which had begun in May. After being injured in the second half of Houston's 3–0 win over the San Diego Wave, it was announced on September 13, 2025, that Schmidt had been placed on the season-ending injury list after undergoing knee surgery.

== International career ==
Schmidt has represented Canada at both the U-17 and U-20 level, and captained Canada at the 2006 FIFA U-20 Women's World Championship in Russia. She made her senior debut against Netherlands on 19 April 2005.

In her first World Cup she scored against Ghana on 15 September 2007. She subsequently started all four Olympic matches at Beijing 2008, and played at the 2011 FIFA Women's World Cup. Schmidt and her team won a 2011 Pan American Games gold medal.

On 28 February 2012, Schmidt made her 30th consecutive international appearance in a match against Scotland in Cyprus and had her first two-goal game. Schmidt and her teammates won an Olympic bronze medal at London 2012. She scored two goals in a 3–0 win over Finland at the 2014 Cyprus Cup on 5 March 2014, marking her 65th consecutive appearance for Canada, with head coach John Herdman saying of her goalscoring performance "We have been asking Sophie and the midfielders to start chipping in with goals. We really didn’t blow teams away in terms of the goals because we were either trigger-shy or players weren’t getting into the right areas early enough. So we’ve been working on that". In August 2016, she won the bronze medal in the 2016 Summer Olympics.

18 February 2021, she played her 200th match for Canada in a 1–0 defeat against the United States in the 2021 SheBelieves Cup. On August 6, 2021, she won the Olympic gold medal in the 2020 Summer Olympics with Canada, playing once by starting in a 1-1 draw against Great Britain, becoming one of three players in the national program to win 3 consecutive Olympic medals, alongside Christine Sinclair and Desiree Scott.

Schmidt was named Canada Soccer Player of the Month for August 2022.

Following the Tokyo Olympics, the Canadian women's team became enmeshed in disputes over compensation and funding with the Canadian Soccer Association. Schmidt, frustrated, contemplated immediate retirement in early 2023, but was persuaded by coach Bev Priestman to delay her retirement until after the 2023 FIFA Women's World Cup. As a sign that the team was playing under protest, during their November 2023 SheBelieves Cup match against the United States the Canadian players wore their training jerseys inside out and used purple wrist tape as a symbol of gender equality, with Schmidt saying "we are so proud and honoured to play for Canada. But right now we feel as though our federation has let us down". On March 9, 2023, Schmidt spoke before the House of Commons Standing Committee on Canadian Heritage alongside teammates Christine Sinclair, Quinn and Janine Sonis, criticizing Canada Soccer's treatment of the women's program. Named to the Canadian squad for the fifth time, Schmidt was used as a substitute in Canada's first two group stage matches, replacing Sinclair in the 71st minute of Canada's opening 0–0 draw against Nigeria, and playing a crucial role in victory over Ireland after setting up Adriana Leon's game-winning goal.

Following Canada's group stage exit from the 2023 World Cup, Schmidt initially followed through on her planned international retirement. However, once longtime teammate Christine Sinclair announced her own impending retirement for year's end, Schmidt was persuaded to return one final time for the second of two scheduled matches against Australia to be played in both women's home province of British Columbia. Following an injury to midfielder Julia Grosso, she agreed to feature in both matches. She was brought on as a substitute in Canada's 5–0 win over Australia on December 1, 2023. On December 5, 2023, Schmidt made her final international appearance, a 1–0 victory in a friendly match against Australia held at BC Place in Vancouver, entering as a second-half substitute for Sinclair. Before the game, Schmidt, along with Christine Sinclair and Erin McLeod, had their international careers celebrated.

== Personal life ==
Schmidt became engaged to Nic Kyle, an actor and singer, in September 2017. They married in New Zealand in December 2018.

Schmidt received an honorary degree from the University of the Fraser Valley in 2019.

== Career statistics ==
=== Club ===
As of Auugst 4, 2026

Club	League	Season	League		Playoffs		Cup		Continental		Total	
Club	League	Season	Apps	Goals	Apps	Goals	Apps	Goals	Apps	Goals	Apps	Goals
Sky Blue FC	NWSL	2013	20	7	0	0	0	0	0	0	20	7
Sky Blue FC	NWSL	2014	22	1	0	0	0	0	0	0	22	1
Sky Blue FC	Total		42	8	0	0	0	0	0	0	42	8
FFC Frankfurt	Bundesliga	2015–16	14	0	0	0	1	0	5	1	20	1
FFC Frankfurt	Bundesliga	2016–17	21	3	0	0	1	0	0	0	21	3
FFC Frankfurt	Bundesliga	2017–18	17	3	0	0	3	1	0	0	20	4
FFC Frankfurt	Total		52	6	0	0	4	1	5	1	61	8
Houston Dash	NWSL	2019	18	0	0	0	0	0	0	0	18	0
Houston Dash	NWSL	2020	4	3	0	0	7	1	0	0	11	4
Houston Dash	NWSL	2021	18	0	0	0	2	0	0	0	20	0
Houston Dash	NWSL	2022	18	3	1	1	6	0	0	0	25	4
Houston Dash	NWSL	2023	20	0	0	0	2	0	0	0	22	0
Houston Dash	NWSL	2024	23	0	0	0	0	0	3	0	26	0
Houston Dash	NWSL	2025	10	2	0	0	0	0	0	0	10	2
Houston Dash	NWSL	2026	9	0	0	0	0	0	0	0	9	0
Houston Dash	Total		120	8	1	1	17	1	3	0	141	10
Career total			215	22	1	1	20	2	8	1	244	26

=== International goals ===
Key (expand for notes on "international goals" and sorting)
Location	Geographic location of the venue where the competition occurred Sorted by country name first, then by city name
Lineup	Start – played entire match on minute (off player) – substituted on at the minute indicated, and player was substituted off at the same time off minute (on player) – substituted off at the minute indicated, and player was substituted on at the same time (c) – captain Sorted by minutes played
#	NumberOfGoals.goalNumber scored by the player in the match (alternate notation to Goal in match)
Min	The minute in the match the goal was scored. For list that include caps, blank indicates played in the match but did not score a goal.
Assist/pass	The ball was passed by the player, which assisted in scoring the goal. This column depends on the availability and source of this information.
penalty or pk	Goal scored on penalty-kick which was awarded due to foul by opponent. (Goals scored in penalty-shoot-out, at the end of a tied match after extra-time, are not included.)
Score	The match score after the goal was scored. Sorted by goal difference, then by goal scored by the player's team
Result	The final score. Sorted by goal difference in the match, then by goal difference in penalty-shoot-out if it is taken, followed by goal scored by the player's team in the match, then by goal scored in the penalty-shoot-out. For matches with identical final scores, match ending in extra-time without penalty-shoot-out is a tougher match, therefore precede matches that ended in regulation
aet	The score at the end of extra-time; the match was tied at the end of 90' regulation
pso	Penalty-shoot-out score shown in parentheses; the match was tied at the end of extra-time
	Green background color – exhibition or closed door international friendly match
	Yellow background color – match at an invitational tournament
	Red background color – Olympic women's football qualification match
	Blue background color – FIFA women's world cup final tournament
NOTE: some keys may not apply for a particular football player

Goal	Date	Location	Opponent	Lineup	#	Min	Score	Result	Competition
1	2005-04-27	Bischheim, France	France	Start	1.1	75	1–0	2–0	Friendly
2	2006-03-04	Vancouver, Canada	Netherlands	Start	1.1	71	3–1	3–1	Friendly
3	2007-09-15	Hangzhou, China	Ghana	Start	1.1	55	2–0	4–0	FIFA Women's World Cup
4	2012-01-23	Vancouver, Canada	Costa Rica	off 60' (on Timko)	1.1	10	2–0	4–2	Olympic qualifier
5	2012-02-28	Larnaca, Cyprus	Scotland	off 77' (on Buckland)	2.1	36	2–1	5–1	Cyprus Cup
6	2012-02-28	Larnaca, Cyprus	Scotland	off 77' (on Buckland)	2.2	51	3–1	5–1	Cyprus Cup
7	2012-03-31	Malmö, Sweden	Sweden	Start	1.1	87	1–3	1–3	Friendly
8	2013-03-06	Larnaca, Cyprus	Switzerland	off 86' (on Lawrence)	1.1	2	1–0	2–0	Cyprus Cup
9	2013-12-22	Brasília, Brazil	Scotland	Start	1.1	90	1–0	1–0	Brasília Tournament
10	2014-03-05	Nicosia, Cyprus	Finland	off 72' (on Ezurike)	2.1	35	1–0	3–0	Cyprus Cup
11	2014-03-05	Nicosia, Cyprus	Finland	off 72' (on Ezurike)	2.2	42	2–0	3–0	Cyprus Cup
12	2014-03-12	Nicosia, Cyprus	Republic of Ireland	Start	1.1	90	2–1	2–1	Cyprus Cup
13	2014-06-18	Vancouver, Canada	Germany	off 80' (on Leon)	1.1	54	1–1	1–2	Friendly
14	2014-06-18	Vancouver, Canada	Japan	Start	2.1	58	1–1	2–3	Friendly
15	2014-06-18	Vancouver, Canada	Japan	Start	2.2	90+1	2–2	2–3	Friendly
16	2015-05-29	Hamilton, Canada	England	Start	1.1	23	1–0	1–0	Friendly
17	2016-08-12	São Paulo, Brazil	France	off 81' (on Quinn)	1.1	55	1–0	1–0	Olympics: quarterfinal
18	2017-03-03	Almancil, Portugal	Russia	off 78' (on Carle)	1.1	9	1–0	2–1	Algarve Cup
19	2019-04-08	San Pedro del Pinatar, Spain	Nigeria	on 46' (off Grosso)	1.1	53	1–0	2–1	Friendly
20	2022-07-12	Guadalupe, Mexico	Costa Rica	on 61' (off Quinn)	1.1	70	2–0	2–0	Concacaf W Championship

== Honours ==
Houston Dash

- NWSL Challenge Cup: 2020

Canada U20

- CONCACAF Women's U-20 Championship: 2008

Canada

- CONCACAF Women's Championship: 2010
- Summer Olympics: 2021; bronze medal: 2012, 2016
- Pan American Games: 2011
- CONCACAF Women's U-20 Championship: 2008
- Algarve Cup: 2016
- Four Nations Tournament: 2015
- Cyprus Cup: 2008, 2011

Individual

- Canadian U-20 Player of the Year: 2007
- BC Soccer Youth Player of the Year: 2005
- BC Soccer Adult Player of the Year: 2007

== See also ==
- List of women's footballers with 100 or more caps
