= Maggie Graham =

American soccer player (born 2002)

- Graham with Houston Dash in 2026

Personal information
- Full name: Margaret Isabel Graham
- Date of birth: July 10, 2002 (age 24)
- Height: 5 ft 9 in (1.75 m)
- Position: Midfielder

Team information
- Current team: Houston Dash
- Number: 19

College career
| Years | Team | Apps | (Gls) |
| 2020–2024 | Duke Blue Devils | 101 | (22) |

Senior career*
| Years | Team | Apps | (Gls) |
| 2025– | Houston Dash | 50 | (7) |

International career
| 2018 | United States U-16 | | |
| 2020 | United States U-18 | 3 | (1) |
- * Club domestic league appearances and goals as of 03:13, November 8, 2026 (UTC)

Margaret Isabel Graham (born July 10, 2002) is an American professional soccer player who plays as a midfielder for the Houston Dash of the National Women's Soccer League (NWSL). She played college soccer for the Duke Blue Devils, earning first-team All-American honors in 2024.

== Early life ==
Raised in Atlanta, Graham played multiple sports at the Westminster Schools, including soccer, basketball, track, and cross country, and won state championships in soccer and cross country as a freshman. She played DA club soccer for NTH Tophat, serving as captain for four years. She committed to play college soccer for Duke as a sophomore. She was ranked by TopDrawerSoccer as the 40th-best recruit of the 2020 class.

== College career ==
Graham made 21 appearances (10 starts) for the Duke Blue Devils as a freshman in 2020, a shortened season due to the COVID-19 pandemic. She started all three games for Duke in the NCAA tournament, assisting Sophie Jones's golden goal against Arizona State in the second round and making her penalty kick in a quarterfinal shootout loss to Florida State. She appeared in 20 games (4 starts) in her sophomore season. She provided the winning assist to her sister, Delaney, in against Memphis in the second round of the NCAA tournament as Duke returned the quarterfinals, falling to Santa Clara.

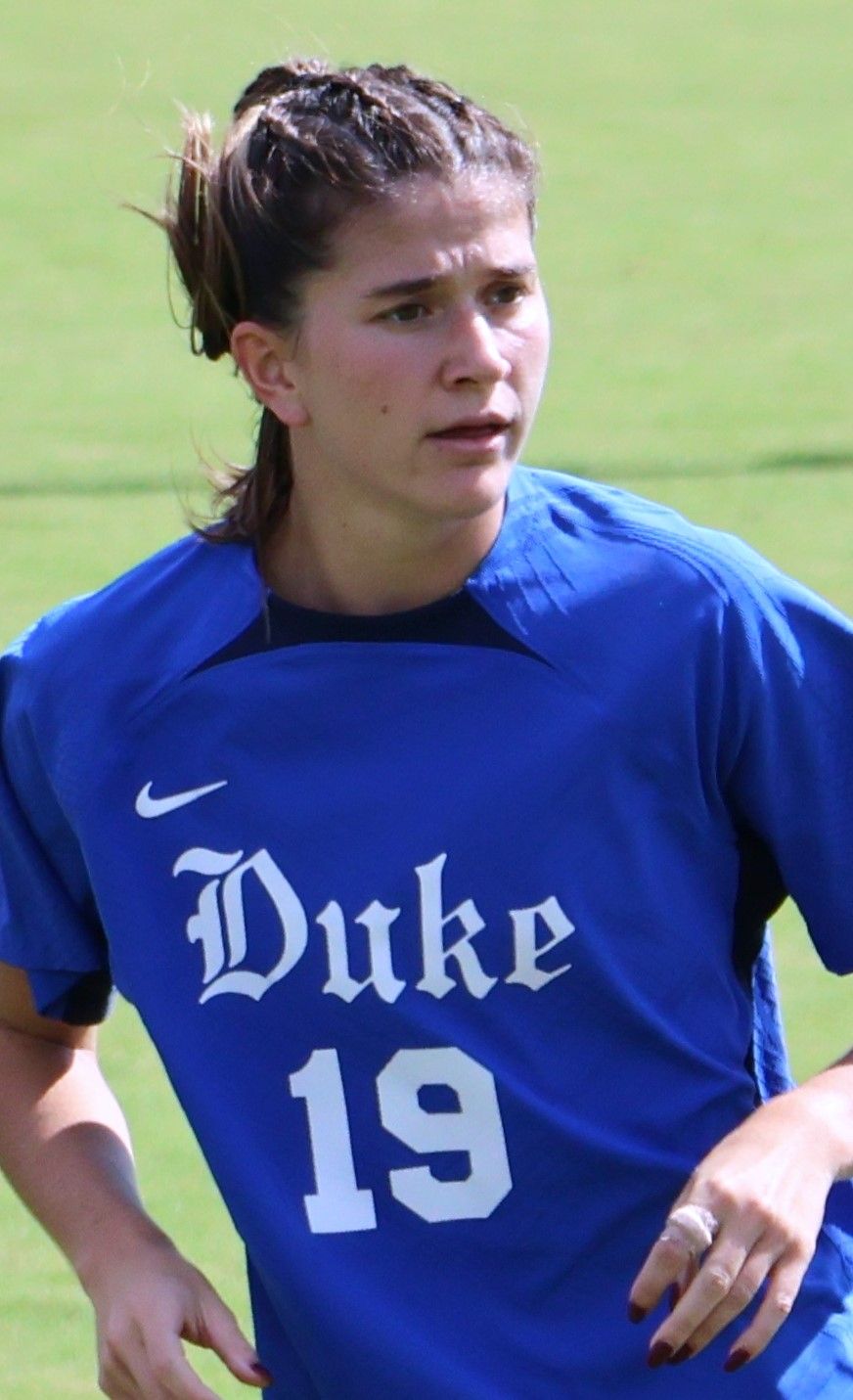
Graham playing for Duke in 2024

Graham played a bigger role in her junior season in 2022, making 22 appearances (20 starts) and scoring 4 goals with 6 assists, with all of her assists in conference play. In the semifinals of the ACC tournament, she was sent off with a straight red card after showing two middle fingers to her North Carolina opponent; Duke lost on penalties after a 0–0 draw. After sitting out the opening round of the NCAA tournament, she started three games as Duke returned to the national quarterfinals, where they lost to Alabama in overtime. In her senior year, she started 16 games and scored one goal with one assist in a down season for Duke, who failed to qualify for the NCAA tournament.

Graham returned to play a fifth season in 2024, using her extra year of eligibility granted by the NCAA due to the pandemic. She started 22 games, led the team with 14 goals (more than doubling her career total), and had 5 assists. She scored the only goal in a 1–0 win against North Carolina during non-conference play, Duke's first-ever home win against the Tar Heels, and scored Duke's third in a 3–2 win against the same opponents during the ACC regular season. She scored a hat trick and had an assist in a 4–1 away win against Stanford. Duke went undefeated in conference play to claim the ACC regular-season title. In the NCAA tournament, Graham scored twice in each of the first two rounds. Duke went on to the semifinals, where they lost 3–0 to North Carolina. After the 2024 season, she was named first-team All-ACC, the ACC Midfielder of the Year, and first-team All-American. She was one of three Duke players to make more than 100 career appearances alongside her sister Delaney and Mackenzie Pluck.

== Club career ==
The Houston Dash announced on January 21, 2025, that they had signed Graham to her first professional contract on a three-year deal. She was the team's first college signing after the abolition of the college draft. She made her professional debut against the Washington Spirit on March 14, replacing Sophie Schmidt as a substitute and scoring with her stomach in the season-opening 2–1 loss. The following week, she scored a minute after entering the game as the Dash came from behind to win 2–1 against the Chicago Stars. She was the first NWSL player to score off the bench in her first two regular-season appearances. She was named the NWSL Rookie of the Month after her performances in March. On May 11, she scored the lone goal in a 1–0 win against the Seattle Reign. On September 14, she sustained a season-ending shoulder injury toward the end of the game against the Utah Royals. She had appeared in all 20 games up to that point, starting 16, and scored 3 goals. She finished the season tied for second on the team in goals and tied for first with three assists. She was named the club's Young Player of the Year at the end of the season.

Graham made her return from injury in the season opener on March 14, 2026, starting and assisting Makenzy Robbe's goal in a 1–0 win over the San Diego Wave.

== International career ==
Graham appeared in friendlies for the United States youth national team at the under-16 and under-18 level, scoring against China U18 in 2020. In June 2025, she was called into training with the United States under-23 team at a camp held concurrently with the senior national team.

== Personal life ==
Graham is the younger of two daughters born to Chris and Marie Graham. She is of Cuban descent. Her father rowed crew at Cornell. Her sister, Delaney, played soccer alongside her at Duke.

== Career statistics ==
As of April 4, 2026

Appearances and goals by club, season and competition
| Club | Season | League | | | Playoffs | | Total | |
| Club | Season | Division | Apps | Goals | Apps | Goals | Apps | Goals |
|---|---|---|---|---|---|---|---|---|
| Houston Dash | 2025 | NWSL | 20 | 3 | — | | 20 | 3 |
| Houston Dash | 2026 | NWSL | 4 | 1 | | | 4 | 1 |
| Career total | | | 24 | 4 | 0 | 0 | 24 | 4 |

== Honors and awards ==
Duke Blue Devils

- Atlantic Coast Conference: 2024

Individual

- NWSL Rookie of the Month: March 2025
- First-team All-American: 2024
- First-team All-ACC: 2024
- ACC Midfielder of the Year: 2024
- Houston Dash Young Player of the Year: 2025
