= Avery Patterson =

American soccer player (born 2002)

- Patterson inspires Young Players at Pro Player Series with the Houston Dash, 2026

Personal information
- Full name: Avery Jean Patterson
- Date of birth: June 14, 2002 (age 24)
- Place of birth: Jacksonville, Florida, U.S.
- Height: 5 ft 6 in (1.68 m)
- Positions: Right back; wingback; winger

Team information
- Current team: Houston Dash
- Number: 15

College career
Years	Team	Apps	(Gls)
2021–2023	North Carolina Tar Heels	72	(27)

Senior career*
Years	Team	Apps	(Gls)
2024–	Houston Dash	72	(4)

International career^{‡}
2022	United States U-20	7	(6)
2025–	United States	15	(1)
- * Club domestic league appearances and goals as of 03:17, November 8, 2026 (UTC) ‡ National team caps and goals as of October 10, 2026

Avery Jean Patterson (born June 14, 2002) is an American professional soccer player who plays as a right back, wingback, or winger for the Houston Dash of the National Women's Soccer League (NWSL) and the United States national team. Patterson played college soccer for the North Carolina Tar Heels and was selected by the Dash in the second round of the 2024 NWSL Draft.

== Early life ==
Born and raised in Jacksonville, Florida, Patterson began playing soccer at age four. Mostly a central midfielder growing up, she played club soccer for Florida Elite Soccer Academy was named the ECNL Southeast Player of the Year in 2018. She played high school soccer at the Bolles School, winning three straight FHSAA championships from 2018 to 2020. She committed to play college soccer at North Carolina as a sophomore. She also ran varsity cross country and track in high school.

== College career ==
Patterson missed her freshman regular season with the North Carolina Tar Heels due to injury in fall 2020. In the spring portion of the season (postponed due to the COVID-19 pandemic), she started 7 games at center back as the team reached the NCAA tournament semifinals. In her sophomore season in 2021, she featured at outside back and scored 5 goals with 3 assists in 17 games.

Patterson moved to right wing and started all 26 games in her junior year in 2022. She led the team with 13 goals and added 8 assists, earning second-team All-ACC honors. North Carolina topped the ACC regular-season standings. In the ACC tournament, she opened scoring in the final, a 2–1 loss to Florida State. In the NCAA tournament, she provided a tournament-high five assists, helping the team advance to the final against UCLA. She scored twice in the title game to give the Tar Heels a 2–0, but the Bruins came back late to win 3–2 in overtime. Patterson became a team captain in her senior season in 2023. She scored 9 goals with 2 assists in 22 games, earning first-team All-ACC and third-team All-American honors.

== Club career ==
The Houston Dash selected Patterson with the 19th overall pick in the second round of the 2024 NWSL Draft. She was signed to a three-year contract. She made her professional debut on March 16, starting and playing the entire match in a season-opening 5–1 loss to the North Carolina Courage. She played multiple positions from winger to midfielder to right wingback, settling there by the end of the season. On November 2, she scored her first professional goal in the season finale, a 3–2 loss to Bay FC. She finished her rookie season with 2 assists and 1 goal in 28 appearances in all competitions, logging the most minutes of any Dash field player. She was named the club's Newcomer of the Year. After the season, she signed a new three-year contract through the 2027 season.

Patterson solidified her position at right back in the 2025 season. She played and started in 22 games and scored 3 goals, tied with Maggie Graham for second on the team. She was nominated for NWSL Defender of the Year, the first Dash finalist for an NWSL award since Jane Campbell in 2023, and was named the club's Most Valuable Player. Patterson was also named to the 2025 NWSL Best XI.

== International career ==
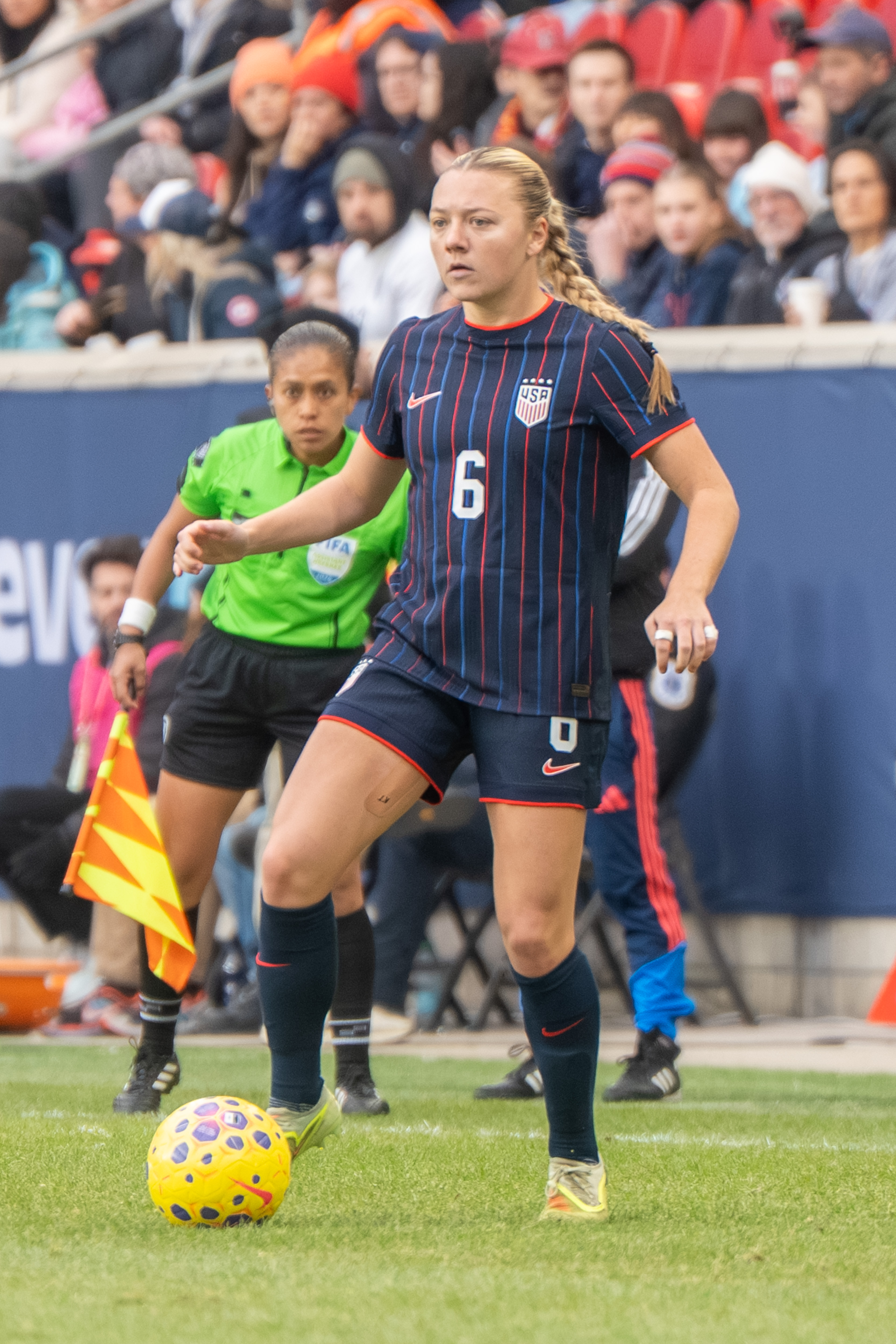
Avery Patterson during USWNT vs Colombia on March 7, 2026

Patterson trained with the United States under-14 team in 2016. She scored four goals on under-20 debut at the 2022 CONCACAF Women's U-20 Championship, all in the first half against Puerto Rico. She finished the tournament with six goals in five games as the United States won the competition, but she was not selected to the subsequent 2022 FIFA U-20 Women's World Cup. She played friendlies with the under-23 team against NWSL teams in the 2023 preseason.

Patterson was called up by Emma Hayes into Futures Camp, practicing concurrently with the senior national team, in January 2025. Two months later, she received her first call-up to the senior team before a pair of friendlies against Brazil. Her senior international debut came on April 5, 2025, as an 88th-minute substitute for Emily Fox in a 2–0 victory over Brazil at SoFi Stadium. Earlier in the day, she had been stuck in a hotel elevator with Becky Sauerbrunn and Alana Cook for over an hour. Three days later, she made her first start and played 67 minutes before leaving the game with a black eye after the ball hit her in the face. She scored her first senior goal in her fifth international appearance, heading in a cross from Rose Lavelle to open the scoring in a 4–0 win over the Republic of Ireland on June 26.

== Personal life ==
Patterson is the daughter of Lori and Andrew Patterson. Many members of her family played American football, including her father who played sprint football for Navy; and one of her great uncles was inducted into the Pro Football Hall of Fame.

== Career statistics ==
=== Club ===
As of November 2, 2025

Appearances and goals by club, season and competition
Club	Season	League			Playoffs		Cup		Continental		Total	
Club	Season	Division	Apps	Goals	Apps	Goals	Apps	Goals	Apps	Goals	Apps	Goals
Houston Dash	2024	NWSL	25	1	—		—		—		25	1
Houston Dash	2025	NWSL	21	3	—		—		—		21	3
Career total			46	4	0	0	0	0	0	0	46	4

=== International ===
As of match played June 9, 2026

Appearances and goals by national team and year
National team	Year	Apps	Goals
United States	2025	9	1
United States	2026	6	0
Total		15	1

Scores and results list United States's goal tally first, score column indicates score after each Patterson goal.

List of international goals scored by Avery Patterson
No.	Date	Venue	Opponent	Score	Result	Competition	Ref.
1	June 26, 2025	Commerce City, Colorado	Republic of Ireland	1–0	4–0	Friendly	

== Honors and awards ==
United States

- SheBelieves Cup: 2026

United States U-20

- CONCACAF Women's U-20 Championship: 2022

Individual

- National Women's Soccer League Best XI First Team: 2025
- Houston Dash Most Valuable Player: 2025
- Houston Dash Newcomer of the Year: 2024
- Third-team All-American: 2023
- First-team All-ACC: 2023
- Second-team All-ACC: 2022
