= Kate Faasse =

American soccer player (born 2004)

- Faasse with the Houston Dash in 2026

Personal information
- Full name: Kate Louis Faasse
- Date of birth: June 4, 2004 (age 22)
- Place of birth: Phoenix, Arizona, United States
- Height: 5 ft 7 in (1.70 m)
- Positions: Forward; midfielder

Team information
- Current team: Houston Dash
- Number: 23

Youth career
- SC del Sol
- Phoenix Rising
- 2019–2022: Pinnacle Pioneers

College career
Years	Team	Apps	(Gls)
2022–2025	North Carolina Tar Heels	88	(35)

Senior career*
Years	Team	Apps	(Gls)
2026–	Houston Dash	27	(4)
- * Club domestic league appearances and goals as of 03:13, November 8, 2026 (UTC)

Kate Louis Faasse (born June 4, 2004) is an American professional soccer player who plays as a forward for the Houston Dash of the National Women's Soccer League (NWSL). She played college soccer for the North Carolina Tar Heels, winning the national championship and the Hermann Trophy in 2024.

== Early life ==
Faasse was born in Phoenix, Arizona, the daughter of Shelley and Adrian Faasse. She played high school soccer at Pinnacle High School in Phoenix, scoring 28 goals with 10 assists as a sophomore. After missing her junior year due to injury, she captained Pinnacle in her senior year and led the team with 31 goals and 12 assists, earning the conference offensive player of the year award. She committed to play college soccer for North Carolina as a freshman. She played club soccer for SC del Sol before moving to ECNL club Phoenix Rising.

== College career ==
Faasse was a deep reserve for the North Carolina Tar Heels as a freshman in 2022, playing in 17 games and scoring 2 goals. She was unused in the national championship game as the Tar Heels lost to UCLA. She gained more minutes as a sophomore in 2023, scoring 2 goals in 23 games.

Following the departure of forwards including Ally Sentnor and Avery Patterson, Faasse stepped into a starting role in her junior year in 2024. In the second game of the season, she scored twice in the final three minutes to pull off a 3–2 come-from-behind win over Colorado. She scored 7 goals in 10 games during the Atlantic Coast Conference (ACC) regular season. In the ACC tournament first round, she scored her third brace of the season by way of one penalty and one header as the Tar Heels won 2–0 against Virginia Tech. She did the same thing in the ACC tournament final, giving the Tar Heels a 2–1 lead over Florida State before losing 3–2. She scored four goals in the NCAA tournament, including a golden goal in the 2–1 quarterfinal win against Penn State and a penalty in the 3–0 semifinal win against Duke. North Carolina defeated Wake Forest 1–0 in the final, winning its 23rd national title and first since 2012.

Faasse with North Carolina in 2025

Faasse finished her junior season as NCAA Division I's leading scorer with 20 goals in 27 games, the most by a Tar Heel since Casey Nogueira in 2008. Her eight game-winning goals also led the nation. She was named first-team All-ACC and first-team All-American; won the TopDrawerSoccer National Player of the Year award, the Hermann Trophy (the first Tar Heel winner since Crystal Dunn in 2012), and the Honda Sports Award for soccer; and was nominated for the Best Female College Athlete ESPY Award.

Faasse scored 11 goals in 21 games in her senior year in 2025, ranking second on the team in scoring while leading the Tar Heels in minutes played. Unseeded in the NCAA tournament, she scored twice in a 3–1 win over Tennessee in the first round. The team lost to TCU in the third round on penalties, with Faasse missing hers. She was named third-team All-ACC after the season.

== Club career ==
Faasse with the Houston Dash in 2026

The Houston Dash announced on January 14, 2026, that they had signed Faasse to her first professional contract on a three-year deal. She made her professional debut in the season opener on March 14, starting in a 1–0 win over the San Diego Wave. On May 20, she scored her first professional goal with a low strike from outside the box, and added an assist to fellow rookie Kat Rader, as the Dash drew 2–2 against the same opponents.

== International career ==
Faasse was called into training camp with the United States under-14 team in 2018 and virtual training with the under-18 team in 2021. She was called up by Emma Hayes into Futures Camp, training concurrently with the senior national team, in January 2025.

== Honors and awards ==
North Carolina Tar Heels

- NCAA Division I women's soccer tournament: 2024
- Atlantic Coast Conference: 2022

Individual

- Hermann Trophy: 2024
- TopDrawerSoccer National Player of the Year: 2024
- First-team All-American: 2024
- First-team All-ACC: 2024
- Third-team All-ACC: 2025
- ACC tournament all-tournament team: 2024
