= 2023 Kansas City Current season =

Kansas City Current's third season

Kansas City Current
2023 season
- Owners: Angie Long; Chris Long; Brittany Mahomes; Patrick Mahomes
- General manager: Camille Levin Ashton
- Head coach: Matt Potter (until Apr 19); Caroline Sjöblom (since Apr 19)
- Stadium: Children's Mercy Park (capacity: 18,467)
- Top goalscorer: League: Debinha (9); All: Debinha (9)
- Highest home attendance: 15,671 (Oct 7 vs CHI)
- Lowest home attendance: 4,590 (Sep 6 vs NCC)
- Average home league attendance: 10,535
- Biggest win: 4–0 (Jun 14 vs CHI)
- Biggest defeat: 1–4 (Apr 1 vs POR)
Home colors	Away colors
- All statistics correct as of October 7, 2023.

The 2023 Kansas City Current season was the team's third season as a professional soccer team. The Current played in the National Women's Soccer League (NWSL), the top tier of women's soccer in the United States.

== Background ==
The Current were finalists in the 2022 season, losing 2–0 to Portland Thorns FC in the championship match. This was a vast turnaround from the 2021 season, in which the Current finished last in the regular season.

== Summary ==
=== Ownership changes ===
In January 2023, the club announced Kansas City Chiefs quarterback Patrick Mahomes as a new club co-owner.

=== Coaching changes ===
On January 25, 2023, the Current announced that it had hired Sweden under-19 national team manager Caroline Sjöblom as an assistant to head coach Matt Potter on a contract until 2024. In an interview with Aftonbladet, she said the offer was for more money than any club in Sweden could provide and praised the Current's facilities, staff, and ambitions.

=== Injuries ===
On October 16, 2022, midfielder Claire Lavogez suffered a torn anterior cruciate ligament (ACL) during the Current's NWSL playoffs quarter-finals match against Houston Dash. On January 30, 2023, the Current announced that she would remain on the team's season-ending injury list while recovering, though she was expected to recover during the summer.

In January 2023, midfielder Sam Mewis underwent a second surgery for a knee injury that she had been rehabilitating since 2021, and Kansas City announced that she would remain on the season-ending injury list as she had been in 2022. The team also bought out her contract and re-signed her to a one-year deal toward her recovery. She had not yet made a regular-season appearance since her acquisition.

During the Current's April 19, 2023, match against the Houston Dash, defender Mallory Weber tore her right ACL. The match had been Weber's first since tearing her ACL in the same knee a year prior. The Current announced on April 27 that it had added Weber to the season-ending injury list.

The Current also dealt with early-season injuries to defenders Elizabeth Ball and Alex Loera, and midfielder and co-captain Desiree Scott, forcing the club to rely on defensive rookies Gabrielle Robinson, a draft pick, and Croix Soto, a preseason trialist.

=== Draft, trades, and transfers ===
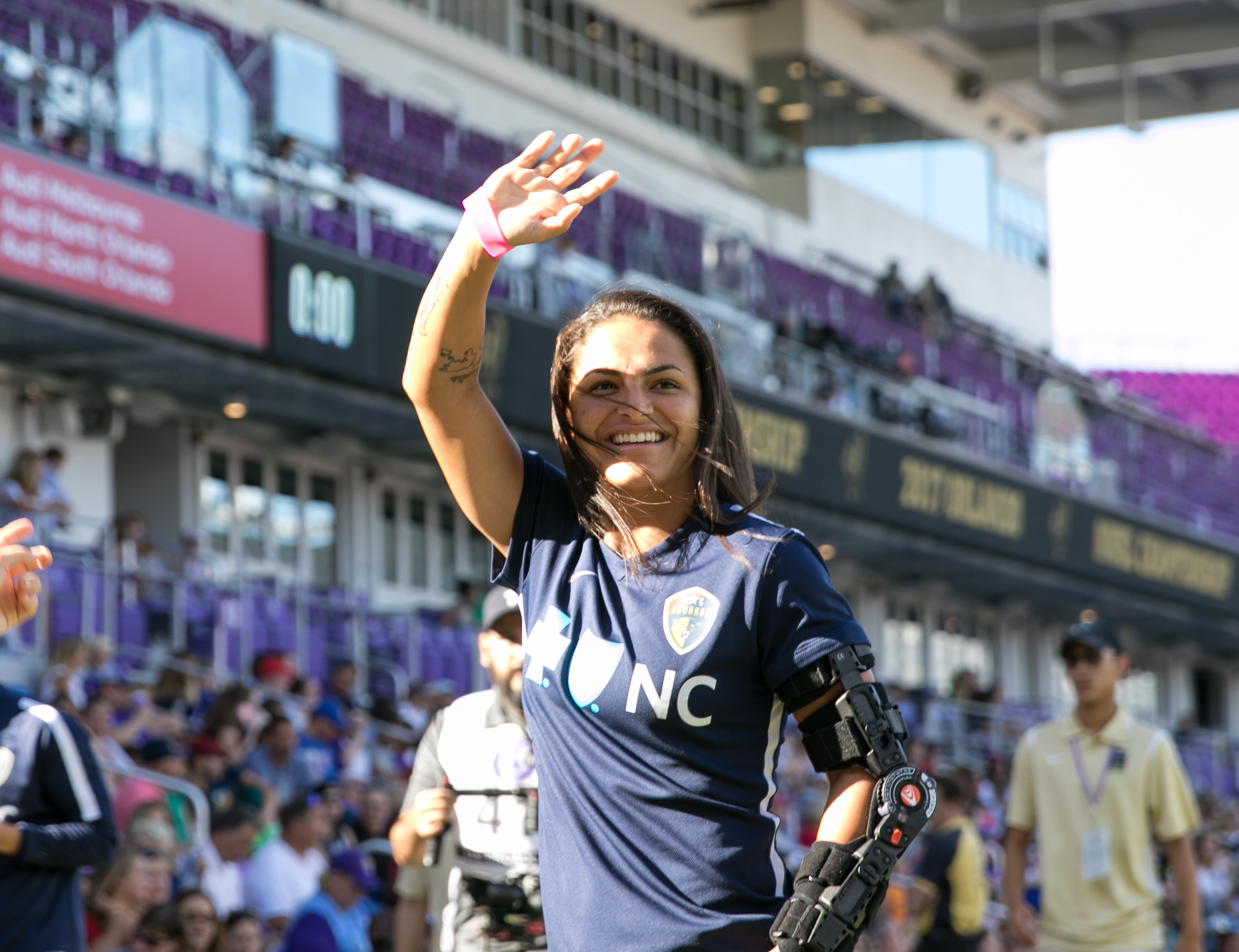
The Current signed Debinha as a free agent from the North Carolina Courage

==== Free agent signings ====
The NWSL introduced free agency after the 2022 NWSL season as part of its newly signed collective bargaining agreement with the NWSL Players Association, and the Current acquired free agents Vanessa DiBernardo and Morgan Gautrat from the Chicago Red Stars, and Debinha from the North Carolina Courage.

Orlando Pride, FC Barcelona Femení, Paris Saint-Germain Féminine, Manchester United W.F.C., and unnamed clubs in Brazil were all reportedly pursuing Debinha, with the Pride confirmed to have extended a contract offer.

On July 3, the Current announced the transfer of Danish international Stine Ballisager Pedersen from Norwegian Toppserien club Vålerenga, signing a contract to play for the club through the 2024 season with an option for an additional year. Ballisager had been named to the Danish squad for the 2023 FIFA Women's World Cup and was expected to join the team after the tournament. Neither club disclosed the transfer fee, but Vålerenga described it as the largest in club history.

==== NWSL Draft ====
On January 12, 2023, the Current traded forward Lynn Williams to NJ/NY Gotham FC in exchange for the second-overall pick in the 2023 NWSL Draft, which Kansas City used to select Michelle Cooper. The trade was a surprise to Williams, who was at United States national team camp in New Zealand when it happened. The North Carolina Courage had traded Williams to the Current on January 10, 2022, but she suffered a season-ending hamstring injury in the 2022 NWSL Challenge Cup and had not appeared for Kansas City in a regular-season match.

On April 1, draft pick Mykiaa Minniss's mother claimed that Minniss had been treated poorly by the team. Current general manager Camille Ashton denied knowledge of Minniss's claims, which Minniss subsequently contested.

=== March/April ===
The Current started the regular season with three consecutive losses, conceding nine goals, including a 1–4 loss in its April 1 home opener against Portland Thorns FC that featured a Sophia Smith hat-trick. The match against Portland drew 11,301, which set a club record for attendance to a home opener.

On April 19, Kansas City fired Potter after opening the season with three losses, citing "issues around his leadership and employment responsibilities" as reasons in a statement. The firing occurred hours before the Current were to play Houston Dash in the 2023 NWSL Challenge Cup. The club appointed Sjöblom as interim head coach. Sjöblom learned of Potter's firing and her appointment hours before it occurred and led the Current to a 2–0 victory in her debut as manager, comparing the short turnaround to the limited preparation she had as a youth international coach.

The Current subsequently won two more matches to close out April, both 2–0 victories over Orlando Pride and NJ/NY Gotham FC. Free-agent signing Debinha scored three of her first four goals with the Current in these two matches, including both match-winning tallies.

=== June ===
On June 14, 2023, the Kansas City Current announced the hiring of former Washington Spirit assistant coach Lee Nguyen as an assistant coach under Sjöblom.

== Style of play ==
The Current began the 2023 season under head coach Matt Potter in a 4–3–3 formation before returning to a three-center-back formation used in the 2022 season. After Potter's firing, interim head coach Caroline Sjöblom expressed a preference for a four-back, possession-based system but noted difficulties implementing it without the benefit of a full preseason, and with injuries to starting defender Elizabeth Ball and midfielder Morgan Gautrat.

== Stadium and facilities ==
The team currently plays at Children's Mercy Park in Kansas City, Kansas, sharing it with Sporting Kansas City of Major League Soccer. In October 2021, the team announced plans to build its own 11,500-capacity venue on the Berkley Riverfront of Kansas City, which is expected to open in late 2023 or early 2024, in time for the 2024 NWSL regular season.

The Current continued to train in their dedicated practice facility in Riverside, Missouri, which opened in June 2022. It was the first purpose-built practice facility for an NWSL team.

== Team ==
=== Technical staff ===
As of June 14, 2023.

General manager	Camille Levin Ashton
Head coach	Caroline Sjöblom (interim)
Assistant coach	Lee Nguyen
Assistant coach	Lucas Rodríguez
Assistant coach	Lloyd Yaxley
High performance director	Ben Donachie
Lead analyst	Donna Newberry

=== Squad ===
As of July 3, 2023.

No.	Pos.	Nation	Player
2	MF	USA	Morgan Gautrat
3	DF	SWE	Hanna Glas
4	DF	USA	Hailie Mace
5	FW	USA	Cece Kizer
6	MF	USA	Rylan Childers
7	DF	USA	Elizabeth Ball
8	DF	USA	Kate Del Fava
9	FW	SWE	Mimmi Larsson
10	MF	USA	Lo'eau LaBonta
11	MF	CAN	Desiree Scott (co-captain)
12	DF	DEN	Stine Ballisager Pedersen
14	MF	USA	Chardonnay Curran
15	MF	USA	Sam Mewis (co-captain)
16	MF	USA	Vanessa DiBernardo
17	FW	USA	Michelle Cooper
18	DF	USA	Izzy Rodriguez
19	DF	USA	Jenna Winebrenner
20	DF	USA	Mallory Weber
21	GK	USA	Adrianna Franch
22	DF	USA	Alex Loera
23	DF	USA	Croix Soto
24	DF	USA	Gabrielle Robinson
25	FW	USA	Kristen Hamilton
26	DF	USA	Addisyn Merrick
29	GK	USA	Jordan Silkowitz
38	GK	USA	Cassie Miller
77	FW	USA	Alexa Spaanstra
94	FW	FRA	Claire Lavogez
99	MF	BRA	Debinha

== Competitions ==
=== Challenge Cup ===
==== Group stage ====
April 19, 2023 1	Houston Dash	0–2	Kansas City Current	Houston, Texas
6:30 p.m. CDT (UTC-5)	Jennings (yellow card) 83'	Report	Kizer 36' (LaBonta); Lind 66' (o.g.); Weber (yellow card) 84'	Stadium: Shell Energy Stadium; Attendance: 4,124; Referee: Laura Rodriguez
Note: First match with Caroline Sjöblom as interim head coach.

May 17, 2023 2	Racing Louisville FC	3–2	Kansas City Current	Louisville, Kentucky
7:30 p.m. EDT (UTC-4)	Erceg (yellow card) 20'; DeMelo 25' (Baggett), 30'; Fischer (yellow card) 70'; Kgatlana (yellow card) 83'; Borges 86' (Kgatlana) (yellow card) 90+5'	Report	Cooper 17' (Spaanstra); Mace (yellow card) 61'; Debinha 89' (Spaanstra); Merrick (yellow card) 90+3'	Stadium: Lynn Family Stadium; Attendance: 4,303; Referee: Alexandra Billeter

June 14, 2023 3	Kansas City Current	4–0	Chicago Red Stars	Kansas City, Kansas
7:00 p.m. CDT (UTC-5)	Cooper (yellow card) 20'; Debinha 54' (Mace), 70' (DiBernardo); Mace (yellow card) 55'; DiBernardo 60'; Kizer 62' (Larsson)	Report	Malham (yellow card) 82'	Stadium: Children's Mercy Park; Attendance: 8,226; Referee: Shawn Tehini

July 22, 2023 4	Kansas City Current	3-1	Houston Dash	Kansas City, Kansas
7:00 p.m. CDT (UTC-5)	Hamilton 45+1' 45+4' 68'	Report	Desiano 17'	Stadium: Children's Mercy Park; Attendance: 11,014

July 29, 2023 5	Chicago Red Stars	0-0	Kansas City Current	Bridgeview, Illinois
7:00 p.m. CDT (UTC-5)		Report		Stadium: SeatGeek Stadium; Attendance: 2,959

August 5, 2023 6	Kansas City Current	3-0	Racing Louisville FC	Kansas City, Kansas
7:00 p.m. CDT (UTC-5)	Hamilton 3' 81'; Winebrenner (yellow card) 76'; Mace 90+1'	Report	Millet (yellow card) 25'; Fischer (yellow card) 31'; Alymer (yellow card) 45' (red card) 49'; Nadim (yellow card) 61'	Stadium: Children's Mercy Park; Attendance: 9,321
Note: Postponed from August 4.

==== West Division standings ====
Pos	Team	Pld	W	T	L	GF	GA	GD	Pts	Qualification	KC	LOU	HOU	CHI
1	Kansas City Current	6	4	1	1	14	4	+10	13	Advance to knockout stage	—	3–0	3–1	4–0
2	Racing Louisville FC	6	4	0	2	10	6	+4	12	Advance to knockout stage based on ranking	3–2	—	3–0	2–0
3	Houston Dash	6	2	0	4	4	11	−7	6		0–2	1–0	—	2–0
4	Chicago Red Stars	6	1	1	4	3	10	−7	4		0–0	0–2	3–0	—

Source: NWSL

==== Results by matchday ====
Matchday	1	2	3	4	5	6
Stadium	A	H	H	H	A	A
Result	W	L	W	W	D	W
Position	1	2	2	1	1	1

Updated to match(es) played on August 9, 2022. Source: NWSL
A = Away; H = Home; W = Win; D = Draw; L = Loss

=== Regular season ===
==== Matches ====
March 25, 2023 1	North Carolina Courage	1–0	Kansas City Current	Cary, North Carolina
1:00 p.m. CDT	Gejl 23'	Report		Stadium: WakeMed Soccer Park; Attendance: 4,948; Referee: Alexandra Billeter

April 1, 2023 2	Kansas City Current	1–4	Portland Thorns FC	Kansas City, Kansas
11:50 a.m. CDT	Kizer 58'	Report	Crystal Dunn 3'; Sophia Smith 18' (pen.), 83', 88'	Stadium: Children's Mercy Park; Attendance: 11,301; Referee: Natalie Simon

April 15, 2023 3	Chicago Red Stars	4–2	Kansas City Current	Chicago, Illinois
7:00 p.m. CDT	Stevens 4'; Hocking 49', 67' (yellow card) 77'; Franch 60' (o.g.); Roccaro (yellow card) 90+6'	Report	Cooper (yellow card) 72'; Debinha 74'; Mace (yellow card) 81'; Larsson 90+7'	Stadium: SeatGeek Stadium; Attendance: 2,356; Referee: Elijio Arreguin

April 23, 2023 4	Kansas City Current	2–0	Orlando Pride	Kansas City, Kansas
2:00 p.m. CDT	Debinha 64'; Kizer 68'	Report	Watt (yellow card) 58'	Stadium: Children's Mercy Park; Attendance: 9,808; Referee: Karen Callado

April 30, 2023 5	Kansas City Current	2–0	NJ/NY Gotham FC	Kansas City, Kansas
5:00 p.m. CDT	Debinha 57', 61'; Rodriguez (yellow card) 81'	Report	Krieger (yellow card) 20'; Ryan (yellow card) 47'	Stadium: Children's Mercy Park; Attendance: 9,409; Referee: Adorae Monroy

May 7, 2023 6	Angel City FC	3–2	Kansas City Current	Los Angeles, California
5:00 p.m. PDT	McCaskill (yellow card) 18'; Thompson 31'; Emslie 43'; Endo 45+2'	Report	Rodriguez 57'; Kizer 61'	Stadium: BMO Stadium; Attendance: 19,219; Referee: Tori Penso

May 14, 2023 7	Kansas City Current	0–2	San Diego Wave FC	Kansas City, Kansas
5:00 p.m. CDT	Robinson (yellow card) 74'	Report	Franch 26' (o.g.); Briede 44' (Westphal); Enge (yellow card) 56'; McNabb (yellow card) 59'	Stadium: Children's Mercy Park; Attendance: 12,969; Referee: Danielle Chesky

May 20, 2023 8	Kansas City Current	0–2	Racing Louisville FC	Kansas City, Kansas
7:00 p.m. CDT	LaBonta (yellow card) 73'; DiBernardo (yellow card) 82'	Report	DeMelo 12'; Davis 27'; Howell (yellow card) 36'; Björkegren (yellow card) 61'	Stadium: Children's Mercy Park; Attendance: 10,603; Referee: Brad Jensen

May 26, 2023 9	Kansas City Current	0–2	Houston Dash	Kansas City, Kansas
7:00 p.m. CDT		Report	Ordóñez 42'; Prisock 54'	Stadium: Children's Mercy Park; Attendance: 9,897; Referee: Alyssa Nichols

June 3, 2023 10	Kansas City Current	1–0	North Carolina Courage	Kansas City, Kansas
7:30 p.m. CDT	Hamilton 8'; Mace (yellow card) 90+1'	Report	Kerolin (yellow card) 68'; Speck (yellow card) 75'; Pinto (yellow card) 88'	Stadium: Children's Mercy Park; Attendance: 10,294; Referee: JC Griggs

June 10, 2023 11	OL Reign	2–1	Kansas City Current	Seattle, Washington
7:00 p.m. PDT	Sonnett (yellow card) 16'; Cook (yellow card) 19'; Huerta 36' (pen.); Huitema 68'	Report	Rodriguez 90+1'; Debinha (yellow card) 90+6'	Stadium: Lumen Field; Attendance: 8,271; Referee: Elijio Arreguin

June 18, 2023 12	Kansas City Current	2–3	Washington Spirit	Kansas City, Kansas
6:00 p.m. CDT	Cooper 1'; Debinha 23' (pen.)	Report	Parsons (yellow card) 24'; Sanchez 36'; Metayer 82'; McKeown 87'	Stadium: Children's Mercy Park; Attendance: 9,644; Referee: Natalie Simon

June 24, 2023 13	Orlando Pride	1–2	Kansas City Current	Orlando, Florida
7:00 p.m. EDT	McCutcheon (yellow card) 45+6'; Marta 58' (pen.); Bright (yellow card) 90+2'	Report	Debinha 29' (DiBernardo); Kizer 45+1' (DiBernardo); Gautrat (yellow card) 54'; Hamilton (yellow card) 56'; Del Fava (yellow card) 73'; Miller (yellow card) 88'; Cooper (yellow card) 89'	Stadium: Exploria Stadium; Attendance: 6,473; Referee: Eric Tattersall

July 1, 2023 14	Portland Thorns FC	0–1	Kansas City Current	Portland, Oregon
7:00 p.m. PDT	Klingenberg (yellow card) 35'	Report	Cooper 36' (pen.)	Stadium: Providence Park; Attendance: 17,796; Referee: Tori Penso

July 7, 2023 15	Racing Louisville FC	2–1	Kansas City Current	Louisville, Kentucky
8:00 p.m. EDT	Pikkujämsä 20'; Monaghan 46' (Fischer)	Report	Cooper 7' (pen.) (yellow card) 83'; Ball (yellow card) 34'; Childers (yellow card) 89'	Stadium: Lynn Family Stadium; Attendance: 5,097; Referee: Anya Voigt

August 18, 2023 16	Kansas City Current	1-0	OL Reign	Kansas City, Kansas
7:00 p.m. CDT	Kizer 61' (Izzy Rodriguez); Franch (yellow card) 73'; LaBonta (yellow card) 90+11'	Report	McClernon (yellow card) 49'; Quinn (yellow card) 73'	Stadium: Children's Mercy Park; Attendance: 13,455

August 26, 2023 17	Houston Dash	1-1	Kansas City Current	Houston, Texas
7:30 p.m. CDT	Jacobs (yellow card) 4'; Alozie 67'	Report	LaBonta 51'; Cooper (yellow card) 61'; Rodriguez (yellow card) 90+7'	Stadium: Shell Energy Stadium; Attendance: 4,536

September 1, 2023 18	Kansas City Current	0-1	Angel City FC	Kansas City, Kansas
7:00 p.m. CDT	Cooper (yellow card) 40'; Del Fava (yellow card) 90+7'	Report	Spencer 66'	Stadium: Children's Mercy Park; Attendance: 11,827

September 16, 2023 19	San Diego Wave FC	1-2	Kansas City Current	San Diego, California
7:00 p.m. PDT	Enge 50'; van Egmond (yellow card) 52'	Report	Debinha 3'; Hamilton 22'; Loera (yellow card) 73'	Stadium: Snapdragon Stadium; Attendance: 15,832; Referee: Matthew Corrigan

September 30, 2023 20	Washington Spirit	2-1	Kansas City Current	Washington, D.C.
7:00 p.m. EDT	Staab (yellow card) 20'; Sarr 52'; Rodman 90+1'	Report	Debinha 21'; Mace (yellow card) 39'; Rodriguez (yellow card) 58'; Robinson (yellow card) 87'	Stadium: Audi Field; Attendance: 11,607

October 7, 2023 21	Kansas City Current	6-3	Chicago Red Stars	Kansas City, Kansas
7:00 p.m. CDT	Rodriguez 14'; LaBonta 22'; Spaanstra 44'; Debhina 52'; Kizer 90+2'; Larsson 90+6'	Report	Sharples 20', (yellow card) 90+6'; Nagasato (yellow card) 38'; Pedersen 45+1'; St-Georges 63', (yellow card) 81'	Stadium: Children's Mercy Park; Attendance: 15,671

October 15, 2023 22	NJ/NY Gotham FC	2-2	Kansas City Current	Harrison, New Jersey
5:00 p.m. EDT	Purce 6'; Ryan 15'; Edmonds (yellow card) 45+1'; Nighswonger (yellow card) 90+3'	Report	Spaanstra 26'; Nighswonger 36'	Stadium: Red Bull Arena; Attendance: 9,005

==== Regular season standings ====
Pos	Team	Pld	W	D	L	GF	GA	GD	Pts
8	Washington Spirit	22	7	9	6	26	29	−3	30
9	Racing Louisville FC	22	6	9	7	25	24	+1	27
10	Houston Dash	22	6	8	8	16	18	−2	26
11	Kansas City Current	22	8	2	12	30	36	−6	26
12	Chicago Red Stars	22	7	3	12	28	50	−22	24

Source: NWSL
Rules for classification: Tiebreakers

==== Results summary ====
Overall								Home						Away					
Pld	W	D	L	GF	GA	GD	Pts	W	D	L	GF	GA	GD	W	D	L	GF	GA	GD
22	8	2	12	30	36	−6	26	5	0	6	15	17	−2	3	2	6	15	19	−4

Last updated: October 16, 2023.
Source: NWSLsoccer.com

==== Results by matchday ====
Matchday	1	2	3	4	5	6	7	8	9	10	11	12	13	14	15	16	17	18	19	20	21	22
Stadium	A	H	A	H	H	A	H	H	H	H	A	H	A	A	A	H	A	H	A	A	H	A
Result	L	L	L	W	W	L	L	L	L	W	L	L	W	W	L	W	D	L	W	L	W	D
Position	10	11	11	11	7	9	11	11	12	12	12	12	11	10	12	11	11	12	11	12	11	11

Updated to match(es) played on October 16, 2023. Source: NWSL
A = Away; H = Home; W = Win; D = Draw; L = Loss

== Awards ==
As of July 5, 2023.

=== NWSL monthly awards ===
Best XI of the Month
Month	Pos.	Nat.	Player	Ref.
March/April	MF	(Brazil) BRA	Debinha	
June	MF	(Brazil) BRA	Debinha (2)	

=== NWSL weekly awards ===
Player of the Week
Wk.	Pos.	Nat.	Player	Won	Ref.
4	DF	(United States) USA	Hailie Mace	Nom.	
5	MF	(Brazil) BRA	Debinha	Won	
13	MF	(United States) USA	Vanessa DiBernardo	Nom.	
14	GK	(United States) USA	Cassie Miller	Nom.	

Save of the Week
Wk.	Pos.	Nat.	Player	Won	Ref.
5	GK	(United States) USA	Cassie Miller	Nom.	
14	GK	(United States) USA	Cassie Miller	Nom.	

== Transactions ==
=== 2023 NWSL Draft ===
2023 NWSL Draft selections, by round
R	P	Nat.	Player	Pos.	College	Status	Ref.
1	2	(United States) USA	Michelle Cooper	FW	Duke University	Signed a three-year contract.	
1	10	(United States) USA	Alexa Spaanstra	FW	University of Virginia	Signed a two-year contract.	
2	15	(United States) USA	Gabrielle Robinson	DF	West Virginia	Signed a one-year contract with a one-year option.	
2	18	(United States) USA	Jordan Silkowitz	GK	Iowa State University	Signed a two-year contract.	
3	35	(United States) USA	Mykiaa Minniss	DF	Washington State University	Was not signed; rights waived.	
4	38	(United States) USA	Ella Shamburger	DF	Vanderbilt University	Opted to finish college.	
4	42	(United States) USA	Rylan Childers	MF	University of Kansas	Signed a one-year contract.	
4	48	(United States) USA	Ashley Orkus	GK	University of Mississippi	Was not signed; rights waived.	

=== Contract operations ===
Contract options
Date	Nat.	Player	Pos.	Notes	Ref.
November 15, 2022	(United States) USA	Addisyn Merrick	DF	Option exercised.	
November 15, 2022	(United States) USA	Izzy Rodriguez	DF	Option exercised.	
November 15, 2022	(United States) USA	Jenna Winebrenner	DF	Option exercised.	

Re-signings
Date	Nat.	Player	Pos.	Notes	Ref.
November 15, 2022	(United States) USA	Cece Kizer	FW	Re-signed to a two-year contract.	
December 19, 2022	(United States) USA	Hailie Mace	DF	Re-signed to a three-year contract.	
December 20, 2022	(United States) USA	Kate Del Fava	DF	Re-signed to a two-year contract.	
January 5, 2023	(United States) USA	Alex Loera	DF	Re-signed to a three-year contract.	
January 24, 2023	(Canada) CAN	Desiree Scott	MF	Free agent re-signed to a one-year contract.	
January 30, 2023	(United States) USA	Sam Mewis	MF	Previous contract bought out; re-signed to a one-year contract.	

=== Transfers ===
Transfers in
Date	Nat.	Player	Pos.	Previous team	Fee/notes	Ref.
December 7, 2022	(United States) USA	Vanessa DiBernardo	MF	(United States) Chicago Red Stars	Free agent signed to a two-year contract.	
December 7, 2022	(United States) USA	Morgan Gautrat	MF	(United States) Chicago Red Stars	Free agent signed to a two-year contract.	
December 22, 2022	(Sweden) SWE	Mimmi Larsson	FW	(Sweden) FC Rosengård	Signed a two-year contract.	
January 9, 2023	(Brazil) BRA	Debinha	MF	(United States) North Carolina Courage	Free agent signed a two-year contract with an option for a third year.	
February 7, 2023	(Sweden) SWE	Hanna Glas	DF	(Germany) Bayern Munich	Signed a two-year contract with mutual option for a third year.	
April 14, 2023	(United States) USA	Croix Soto	DF	(United States) University of Oregon	Preseason trialist signed to a one-year contract.	
July 3, 2023	(Denmark) DEN	Stine Ballisager Pedersen	DF	(Norway) Vålerenga	Transferred for an undisclosed fee and signed through the 2024 season with an option for an additional year.	

Transfers out
Date	Nat.	Player	Pos.	Destination team	Fee/notes	Ref.
November 15, 2022	(United States) USA	Jaycie Johnson	FW	None.	Waived.	
November 15, 2022	(United States) USA	Sydney Schneider	GK	(Czech Republic) AC Sparta Prague	Waived.	
December 23, 2022	(United States) USA	Addie McCain	MF	(United States) Chicago Red Stars	Waived.	
January 11, 2023	(United States) USA	Elyse Bennett	FW	(United States) OL Reign	Traded with the 23rd-overall pick in the 2023 NWSL Draft in exchange for $150,000 in allocation money.	
January 12, 2023	(United States) USA	Lynn Williams	FW	(United States) NJ/NY Gotham FC	Traded in exchange for the second-overall pick in the 2023 NWSL Draft.	

=== Retirements ===
Date	Nat.	Player	Pos.	Ref.
November 29, 2022	(United States) USA	Taylor Leach	DF	

=== Injury listings ===
Date	Nat.	Player	Pos.	Injury list	Notes	Ref.
January 30, 2023	(France) FRA	Claire Lavogez	MF	Anterior cruciate ligament tear suffered in 2022 NWSL quarter-finals.	Season-ending injury	
January 30, 2023	(United States) USA	Sam Mewis	MF	Progressive right leg injury.	Season-ending injury	
April 26, 2023	(United States) USA	Mallory Weber	DF	Right knee anterior cruciate ligament tear.	Season-ending injury	
