= Tantillo =

Tantillo is a surname of Italian origin. Notable people with the surname include:

- Rosie Tantillo (born 1984), American soccer player
