= Iliana Hocking =

American soccer player (born 1999)

Personal information
- Date of birth: December 29, 1999 (age 26)
- Place of birth: Anaheim, California, U.S.
- Height: 5 ft 4 in (1.63 m)
- Position: Midfielder

Youth career
- SoCal Blues

College career
Years	Team	Apps	(Gls)
2018–2022	Arizona Wildcats	84	(5)

Iliana Hocking (born December 29, 1999) is an American former soccer player who played as a midfielder. She played college soccer for the Arizona Wildcats before being selected by NJ/NY Gotham FC in the fourth round of the 2023 NWSL Draft. She is the twin sister of professional soccer player Penelope Hocking.

== Early life ==
Hocking was born and raised in Anaheim, California. She started playing soccer in a local Orange County recreational league before moving to Anaheim Hills and joining club team SoCal Blues. With the Blues, she contributed to the club's first-ever ECNL National Championship in program history. However, she was forced to miss the entirety of her penultimate and the first half of her final year of club soccer after breaking her tibia and fibula in a match. Hocking attended Canyon High School, where she was a three-time all-conference honoree. She helped Canyon reach two playoff appearances and earn one league title. Hocking also participated in multiple track and field events at her school. As a junior, she was part of Canyon's 4 × 100 meter relay team that won a league championship.

== College career ==
Hocking played five seasons of college soccer at the University of Arizona. As a freshman in 2018, she came on as a substitute in almost all of the Wildcats' games, tallying 3 assists in approximately 500 minutes. In her sophomore year, she scored her first collegiate goal in a 6–0 season-opening win over Weber State. Hocking then went on to start in all but one of her appearances in each of her respective junior, senior, and fifth-year seasons; she also appeared in all of her team's games in the 2021 spring season and in 2022. In her final year at Arizona, she cemented herself as a defensive leader from the midfield. She ended her collegiate career having made 84 appearances, the second-highest in Wildcats program history.

== Club career ==
Hocking was selected by NJ/NY Gotham FC in the fourth round of the 2023 NWSL Draft (44th overall). She became the first-ever Arizona Wildcats player to be drafted into the National Women's Soccer League. Hocking reported to Gotham's preseason training camp, but was ultimately waived ahead of the club's season-opening roster announcement.

== Personal life ==
Hocking's parents are former Cypress College basketball player Venetta Dorlis and former Major League Baseball player Denny Hocking. Hocking has a fraternal twin sister, Penelope, and they were the first twins born to a member of the Minnesota Twins. Iliana and Penelope played together at Canyon High School.

Iliana and Penelope were the first sisters selected in the same NWSL Draft. Penelope played collegiately as a forward for the USC Trojans, a Pac-12 rival of Arizona that pitted the sisters against each other. Penelope was drafted by the Chicago Red Stars with the seventh overall pick.
