= 2026 USC Trojans women's soccer team =

American college soccer season

2026 USC Trojans women's soccer
- Conference: Big Ten Conference
- Record: 0-0-0 (0-0-0 Big Ten)
- Head coach: Jane Alukonis (4th season)
- Assistant coaches: Sugar Shinohara (4th season); Ahmad Brown (4th season); Megan Hinz (2nd season)
- Home stadium: Rawlinson Stadium

The 2026 USC Trojans women's soccer team will represent the University of Southern California (USC) during the 2026 NCAA Division I women's soccer season. The Trojans will be led by 4th year head coach Jane Alukonis. The Trojans will try to return to the NCAA Tournament after not being selected last year.

== Squad ==
=== Roster ===
As of 22 June 2026

=== Team management ===
Position	Staff
Athletic Director	Jennifer Cohen
Head coach	Jane Alikonis
Assistant Coach	Sugar Shinohara
Assistant Coach	Ahmad Brown
Assistant/Goalkeepers Coach	Megan Hinz
Director of Operations	Spencer Williams
Assistant Sports Performance Coach	Aleksander Beljic

== Schedule ==
Date Time, TV	Rank^{#}	Opponent^{#}	Result	Record	Site (Attendance) City, State
Exhibition
August 5 p.m., TBD		at San Diego State		-- (--)	SDSU Sports Deck; San Diego, California
Non-conference regular season
August 12; TBD p.m., TBD		Duke		(--)	Rawlinson Stadium; Los Angeles, California
August 16; TBD p.m., TBD		at Pepperdine		(--)	Tari Frahm Rokus Field; Malibu, California
August 22; TBD p.m., TBD		at BYU		(--)	South Field; Provo, Utah
August 27; TBD p.m., TBD		New Mexico State		(--)	Rawlinson Stadium; Los Angeles, California
August 30; TBD p.m., TBD		Saint Mary's		(--)	Rawlinson Stadium; Los Angeles, California
September 3 TBD p.m., TBD		at Stanford		(--)	Laird Q. Cagan Stadium; Stanford, California
Big Ten Conference Regular season
Big Ten Tournament
NCAA tournament
*Non-conference game. ^{#}Rankings from United Soccer Coaches. (#) Tournament seedings in parentheses. All times are in Pacific.

== Rankings ==
Ranking movements
	Week																	
Poll	Pre	1	2	3	4	5	6	7	8	9	10	11	12	13	14	15	16	Final
United Soccer													Not released					
TopDrawer Soccer																		
