= Croix Soto =

American soccer player (born 2001)

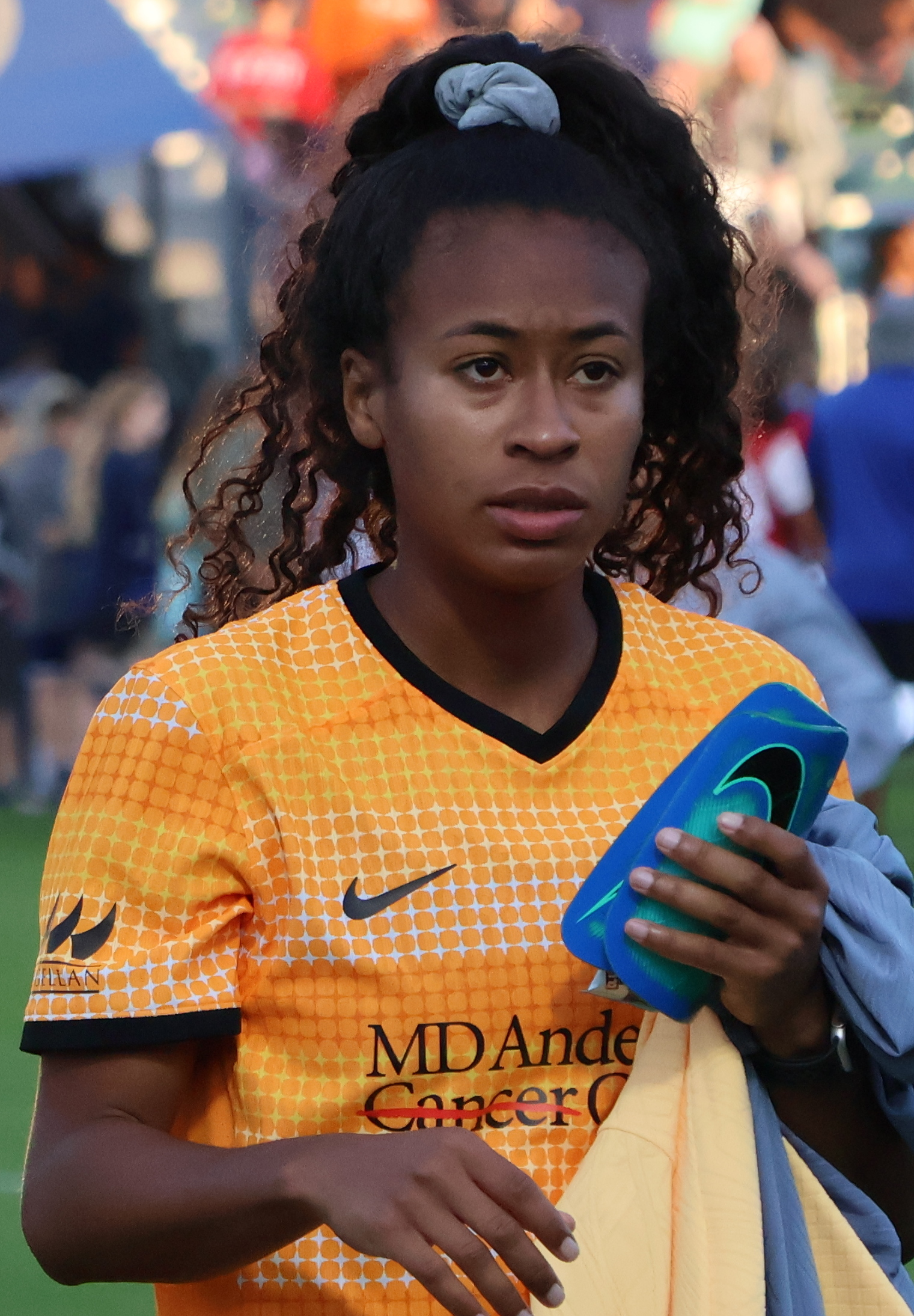
- Soto with the Houston Dash in 2024

Personal information
- Full name: Croix Bratton Soto
- Date of birth: January 2, 2001 (age 25)
- Place of birth: Pasadena, California, United States
- Height: 5 ft 10 in (1.78 m)
- Position: Defender

Team information
- Current team: AFC Toronto
- Number: 5

College career
Years	Team	Apps	(Gls)
2019–2022	Oregon Ducks	62	(0)

Senior career*
Years	Team	Apps	(Gls)
2023	Kansas City Current	12	(0)
2024	Houston Dash	3	(0)
2025–	AFC Toronto	23	(0)
- * Club domestic league appearances and goals as of October 28, 2026

Croix Bratton Soto (born January 2, 2001) is an American professional soccer player who plays as a defender for Canadian club AFC Toronto in the Northern Super League.

== Early life ==
A native of Pasadena, California, Soto is African American, Puerto Rican and German. Her great-grandfather was born in Puerto Rico. She grew up participating in the sports of track and field, basketball, cheer, gymnastics and soccer, which her mother also played.

Soto grew up a fan of the Los Angeles Sol, especially Marta, and Sydney Leroux of the UCLA Bruins.

== College career ==
Soto started all four years she attended University of Oregon She played every minute of the Ducks' 2021 season, during which Oregon held nine clean sheets in 18 games. Soto was a two-time All-Pac 12 selection.

== Club career ==
After graduating from Oregon, Soto went undrafted in the 2023 NWSL Draft. She then practiced with the North Carolina Courage on a trial basis.

Soto signed a one-year deal in 2023 with the Kansas City Current, who had several defenders out for injuries. Soto made eight starts in 12 appearances for the Current.

Soto signed with the Houston Dash for the 2024 season with an option for 2025.

In November 2024, she signed with Canadian club AFC Toronto in the Northern Super League for the 2025 season.

== Career statistics ==
As of match played October 20, 2025

Appearances and goals by club, season and competition
Club	Season	League			Playoffs (Note: Includes NWSL Playoffs)		Cup (Note: Includes the NWSL Challenge Cup)		Total			
Club	Season	Division	Apps	Goals	Apps	Goals	Apps	Goals	Apps	Goals		
Kansas City Current	2023	NWSL	12	0	—		3	0	15	0		
Houston Dash	2024	NWSL	3	0	—		—		3	0		
AFC Toronto	2025	Northern Super League	19	0	0	0	—		19	0		
AFC Toronto	2026	Northern Super League	4	0	0	0	–		–		4	0
AFC Toronto	Total		23	0	0	0	0	0	0	0	23	0
Career total			38	0	3	0	0	0	41	0		
