= Rylan Childers =

American soccer player (born 2000)

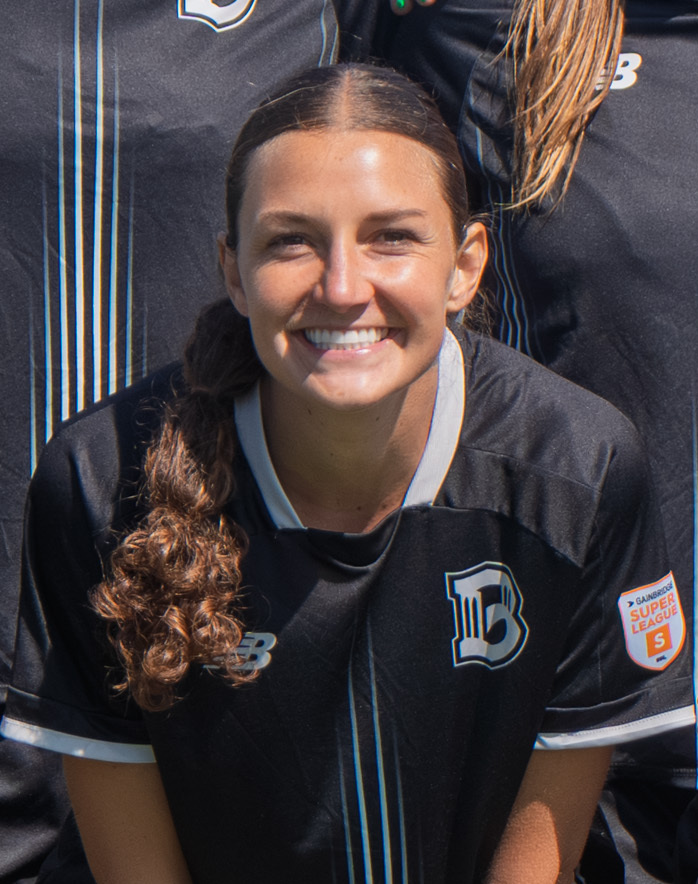
- Childers with Brooklyn FC in 2026

Personal information
- Full name: Rylan Savannah Childers
- Date of birth: June 19, 2000 (age 26)
- Height: 5 ft 7 in (1.70 m)
- Position: Midfielder

College career
Years	Team	Apps	(Gls)
2018–2019	Kansas City Roos	42	(21)
2020–2022	Kansas Jayhawks	52	(14)

Senior career*
Years	Team	Apps	(Gls)
2023	Kansas City Current	4	(0)
2024–2025	Odense Boldklub Q	23	(1)
2026	Brooklyn FC	8	(1)
- * Club domestic league appearances and goals as of 20:14, May 17, 2026 (UTC)

Rylan Savannah Childers (born June 19, 2000) is an American professional soccer player who plays as a midfielder. She played college soccer for the Kansas City Roos and Kansas Jayhawks before being drafted by the Kansas City Current in the 2023 NWSL Draft. She has also previously played for Danish Women's League club Odense Boldklub Q and USL Super League club Brooklyn FC.

== Early life ==
Childers grew up in Grain Valley, Missouri, alongside six other siblings. She was raised in a soccer-involved household, with her father coaching the sport and her siblings playing at various levels (Childers later ended up playing collegiately alongside her sisters). She played soccer for Grain Valley High School, where she broke the school's record for single-season goals and the Missouri state record for career assists.

== College career ==
=== Kansas City Roos ===
Childers played her first stint of college soccer with the Kansas City Roos. She quickly found success as a freshman, operating as a forward and setting the program record in both single season points and assists. She also led the Western Athletic Conference with 11 goals. For her efforts, Childers was named to the All-WAC First Team, the All-Region Second Team, and was recognized as the conference's Freshman of the Year.

The Roos got off to a positive start in 2019, with Childers helping the team go undefeated in their first 6 games. Once again, Childers was a statistical leader, topping the league in points, assists, and the team in terms of goalscoring. She was named to the All-Region Third Team and to the WAC First Team for the second year in a row. She left Kansas City after two seasons, setting the school record in assists and scoring 21 goals.

=== Kansas Jayhawks ===
For her junior season, Childers transferred schools and joined the Kansas Jayhawks, linking up with her younger sister Raena. She scored her first goal with the Jayhawks on October 30, 2020, in a loss to West Virginia. In her first season with Kansas, Childers was the team's top goalscorer. During her next two years of college, Childers was a team captain and was named to the Academic All-Big 12 First Team in both seasons. She departed from the team having started all 52 of the Jayhawks' matches and scored 14 goals.

== Club career ==
=== Kansas City Current ===
Childers was selected by the Kansas City Current as the 42nd overall pick of the 2023 NWSL Draft. She signed a one-year contract with the club on March 20, 2023. Childers made her NWSL debut on April 1, entering Kansas City's home opener as a substitute for Lo'eau LaBonta. On May 17, Childers recorded her first professional start in an NWSL Challenge Cup defeat to Racing Louisville FC. She also made 5 other Challenge Cup appearances as the Current advanced to the semifinals of the competition. At the end of the season, Childers' contract expired and she was waived by the club.

=== Odense Boldklub Q ===
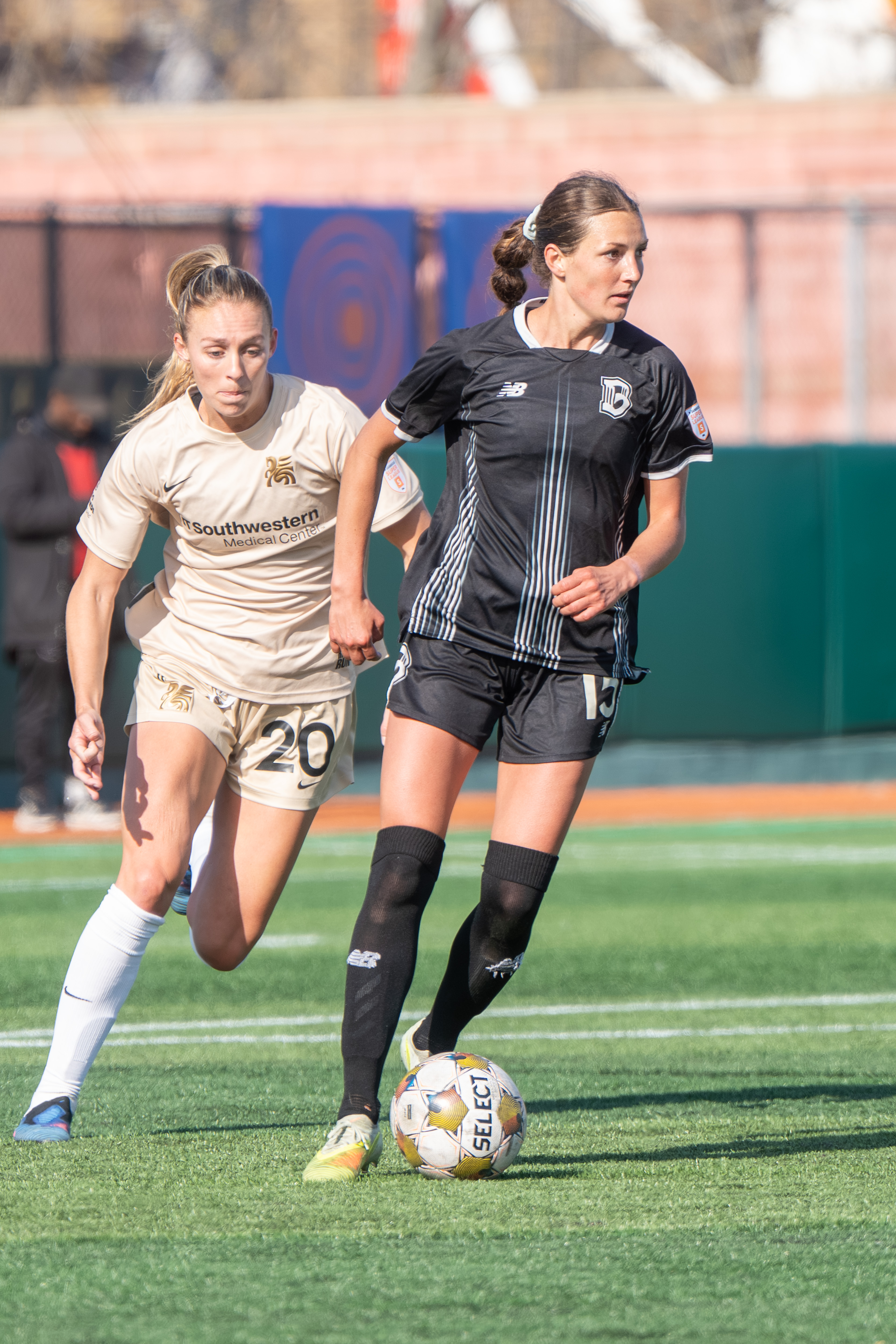
Childers with Brooklyn FC in 2026

On January 26, 2024, Childers signed an 18-month contract with Odense Boldklub Q in the Danish Women's 1st Division. In her first few months with the club, Childers helped Odense gain promotion to the Danish Women's League. She made her league debut on August 10, in a 2–0 victory over AGF. She went on to appear in every single match available to OB Q in the 2024–25 season, cementing herself in the crux of the club's midfield. She scored a total of 4 goals with the club, with her lone league goal coming as a long-range strike that helped OB Q beat Fortuna Hjørring in April 2025, 2–1.

=== Brooklyn FC ===
In March 2026, Childers joined USL Super League club Brooklyn FC. She made her Super League debut on March 22, coming on as a second-half substitute for Jennifer Cudjoe in a 2–0 loss to the Carolina Ascent. On April 25, she scored her first goal for Brooklyn, striking from outside the box with her left foot to open the scoring against the Dallas Trinity. She made 8 appearances in her first season with the club as Brooklyn finished in seventh place, below the playoff line. On July 9, 2026, Childers was revealed to be among the contingent of players departing from Brooklyn FC ahead of the upcoming season.

== Career statistics ==
=== Club ===
As of May 21, 2026

Appearances and goals by club, season and competition
Club	Season	League			Cup (Note: Includes the NWSL Challenge Cup and the Danish Women's 1st division Play-offs)		Playoffs (Note: Includes NWSL Playoffs.)		Total	
Club	Season	Division	Apps	Goals	Apps	Goals	Apps	Goals	Apps	Goals
Kansas City Current	2023	NWSL	4	0	6	0	—		10	0
Odense Boldklub Q	2023–2024	Danish Women's 1st Division	0	0	10	3	—		10	3
Odense Boldklub Q	2024–2025	Danish Women's League	23	1	—		—		23	1
Odense Boldklub Q	Total		23	1	10	3	—		33	4
Brooklyn FC	2025–2026	USL Super League	8	1	—		—		8	1
Career total			35	2	16	3	—		51	5
