= Denny Hocking =

American baseball player (born 1970)

- Utility player
- Born: April 2, 1970 (age 56); Torrance, California, U.S.
- Batted: Switch Threw: Right

MLB debut
- September 10, 1993, for the Minnesota Twins

Last MLB appearance
- September 28, 2005, for the Kansas City Royals

MLB statistics
- Batting average: .251
- Home runs: 25
- Runs batted in: 226
- Stats at Baseball Reference

Teams
- Minnesota Twins (1993–2003); Colorado Rockies (2004); Kansas City Royals (2005)

Dennis Lee "Denny" Hocking (born April 2, 1970) is an American professional baseball manager and former utility player. Hocking played for the Minnesota Twins (1993–2003), Colorado Rockies (2004), and Kansas City Royals (2005). He was a utility player for his entire career, playing every position except pitcher and catcher. Hocking's best year was 2000 when he had a .298 batting average with 4 home runs and 47 RBI, a year where he also played in 10 or more games at 7 different positions. Hocking was never a regular starter at any one position, but played over 100 games at shortstop, second base, third base, and right field.

== Professional career ==
After playing at El Camino College in California, he was drafted in the 52nd round of the 1989 Major League Baseball draft by the Minnesota Twins and made his major league debut in 1993. He played with the Minnesota Twins until 2004 when he went to the Colorado Rockies as a free agent.

When the Twins clinched the 2002 American League Division Series against the heavily-favored Oakland Athletics, Hocking broke his hand in the ensuing celebration. Hocking caught the final out of Game 5 and players piled on top of him. A player he believed to be teammate Jacque Jones stepped on the middle finger of his right hand and split the nail in two places. This injury forced Hocking to miss the entire 2002 American League Championship Series.

== Managerial career ==
In January 2010, Hocking was named hitting coach of the single-A Frederick Keys, a Baltimore Orioles affiliate. He was promoted to the AA Bowie Baysox in 2012 as hitting coach.

In December 2013, the Los Angeles Angels announced that Hocking would be the manager of the Inland Empire 66ers for the 2014 season. The Inland Empire 66ers were the Class A – Advanced affiliate of the Los Angeles Angels.

In 2016, Denny Hocking was working as the Los Angeles Angels minor league infield coordinator.

In 2017, Hocking joined the Seattle Mariners organization and worked as an outfield and baserunning coach with the Triple-A Tacoma Rainiers. Hocking was named the 56th manager for the Clinton LumberKings for the 2018 season and managed the West Virginia Power in 2019.

In 2021, he was the manager for 2021 with the Modesto Nuts.

In January 2022, Hocking was named as the manager of the 18U United States national baseball team.

== Broadcast career ==
Hocking served as an analyst and reporter for MLB.com and teamed with Rob Dibble on Fox Sports Radio. in 2008. He co-hosted with Derrick Deese on Saturdays from 5pm to 8pm Pacific Time.

== Personal life ==
In February 1987, Hocking hit a full-court shot right before halftime in a basketball game for West Torrance High, his hometown team.

In 2000, Hocking's wife Venetta gave birth to fraternal twins, Iliana and Penelope, making him the first player in Twins franchise history to become the father of a set of twins. In 2023, the twins were the first sisters both selected in a National Women's Soccer League draft.
