= 2023 NWSL Draft =

Soccer draft

General information
- Sport: Soccer
- Date: January 12, 2023
- Time: 18:00 ET
- Location: Pennsylvania Convention Center, Philadelphia, Pennsylvania
- Network: CBS Sports

Overview
- 48 total selections in 4 rounds
- League: National Women's Soccer League
- First selection: Alyssa Thompson, Angel City FC
- Most selections: Kansas City Current (8)
- Fewest selections: Angel City FC, NJ/NY Gotham FC, OL Reign (2)

The 2023 NWSL Draft presented by Ally was the eleventh annual meeting of National Women's Soccer League (NWSL) franchises to select amateur players above the age of 18 playing in the United States who exhausted, lost, or renounced any remaining collegiate eligibility, as well as select players that the NWSL had already signed in advance. It was held on January 12, 2023, at the 2023 United Soccer Coaches Convention in Philadelphia and covered by various linear and online platforms of CBS Sports.

Angel City FC selected Alyssa Thompson of the Harvard-Westlake School with the first overall pick. She was the first player ever to be picked in an NWSL draft directly out of high school.

== Format ==
- All 12 teams of the National Women's Soccer League (NWSL) took turns making their selections over four rounds. Draft order in each round was determined by the reverse order of the final 2022 regular season standings, except that the 2022 champions picked last and the runners-up picked second-to-last in each round.
- The list of players eligible for selection was released on January 10, 2023.
- CBS Sports covered the draft on various platforms, including CBS Sports Network, Paramount+, and CBS Sports HQ. International broadcast was available on the NWSL's YouTube channel.

== Results ==
As of May 30, 2025

=== Key ===
^{+}	Denotes player who has been selected as NWSL Most Valuable Player
^{*}	Denotes player who has been selected for an NWSL Best XI or NWSL Second XI team
^{^}	Denotes player who has been selected as NWSL Rookie of the Year
^{#}	Denotes player who has never appeared in a competitive NWSL game (regular season, playoff, or Challenge Cup)

=== Picks ===
Round	Pick	Nat.	Player	Pos.	NWSL team	Notes	College
Round 1	1	(United States)	Alyssa Thompson	F	Angel City FC	(Note: NJ/NY Gotham FC → Angel City FC. Angel City FC acquired the No. 1 pick of the 2023 NWSL Draft from NJ/NY Gotham FC, pending conditions met, in exchange for Yazmeen Ryan and $250,000 in allocation money. The conditions were met on January 7, 2023, when Alyssa Thompson declared for the 2023 NWSL Draft.)	N/A
Round 1	2	(United States)	Michelle Cooper	F	Kansas City Current	(Note: Washington Spirit → Orlando Pride → NJ/NY Gotham FC → Kansas City Current. Kansas City Current acquired the No. 2 pick of the 2023 NWSL Draft from NJ/NY Gotham FC in exchange for Lynn Williams. NJ/NY Gotham FC had previously acquired the No. 2 pick of the 2023 NWSL Draft from Orlando Pride, pending conditions met, in exchange for $350,000 in allocation money and the natural fourth-round pick in the 2024 NWSL Draft. The conditions were met on January 7, 2023, when Alyssa Thompson declared for the 2023 NWSL Draft. Orlando Pride had previously acquired the natural first-round pick in the 2023 NWSL Draft as well as the No. 9 pick in the 2021 NWSL Draft, $140,000 in allocation money, and Meggie Dougherty Howard from Washington Spirit in exchange for Emily Sonnett.)	Duke
Round 1	3	(United States)	Emily Madril *	D	Orlando Pride		Florida State
Round 1	4	(United States)	Jenna Nighswonger *^	M	NJ/NY Gotham FC	(Note: Racing Louisville FC → NJ/NY Gotham FC. NJ/NY Gotham FC acquired the No. 4 pick of the 2023 NWSL Draft from Racing Louisville FC in exchange for the rights to Paige Monaghan, $150,000 in allocation money, and a 2023 international slot.)	Florida State
Round 1	5	(Mexico)	Reyna Reyes	D	Portland Thorns FC	(Note: Angel City FC → Portland Thorns FC. Portland Thorns FC acquired the No. 5 pick in the 2023 NWSL Draft, the natural second-round pick in the 2024 NWSL Draft, and $200,000 in allocation money from Angel City FC in exchange for Yazmeen Ryan.)	Alabama
Round 1	6	(United States)	Olivia Wingate	F	North Carolina Courage		Notre Dame
Round 1	7	(United States)	Penelope Hocking	F	Chicago Red Stars		Penn State
Round 1	8	(Canada)	Sydney Collins	D	North Carolina Courage	(Note: Houston Dash → North Carolina Courage. North Carolina Courage acquired the No. 8 pick in the 2023 NWSL Draft, the natural first-round pick in the 2024 NWSL Draft, a 2023 international spot, and $100,000 in allocation money from Houston Dash in exchange for Diana Ordoñez and the No. 30 pick in the 2023 NWSL Draft.)	California
Round 1	9	(United States)	Clara Robbins	M	North Carolina Courage	(Note: San Diego Wave FC → North Carolina Courage. North Carolina Courage acquired the natural first-round pick in the 2023 NWSL Draft and $190,000 in allocation money from San Diego Wave FC in exchange for the rights to Abby Dahlkemper.)	Florida State
Round 1	10	(United States)	Alexa Spaanstra	F	Kansas City Current	(Note: OL Reign → NJ/NY Gotham FC → Kansas City Current. Kansas City Current acquired either OL Reign's natural first-round pick in the 2023 NWSL Draft, or the second-highest first-round pick held by NJ/NY Gotham FC in the 2023 NWSL Draft and $200,000 in allocation money in exchange for Victoria Pickett. The exact draft pick Kansas City Current acquired was confirmed at 17:00 ET on January 11, 2023, to be the No. 10 pick. NJ/NY Gotham FC had previously acquired the natural first-round pick in the 2023 NWSL Draft and $40,000 in allocation money from OL Reign in exchange for the No. 8 pick in the 2022 NWSL Draft.)	Virginia
Round 1	11	(United States)	Haley Hopkins	F	North Carolina Courage	(Note: Kansas City Current → North Carolina Courage. North Carolina Courage acquired the natural first-round pick in the 2023 NWSL Draft, Katelyn Rowland, and $200,000 in allocation money from Kansas City Current in exchange for the natural second-round pick and fourth-round pick in the 2023 NWSL Draft as well as Lynn Williams.)	Virginia
Round 1	12	(United States)	Izzy D'Aquila	F	Portland Thorns FC		Santa Clara
Round 2	13	(United States)	Sierra Enge	M	San Diego Wave FC	(Note: NJ/NY Gotham FC → San Diego Wave FC. San Diego Wave FC acquired the No. 13 pick of the 2023 NWSL Draft from NJ/NY Gotham FC in exchange for $100,000 in allocation money.)	Stanford
Round 2	14	(United States)	Grace Yochum ^{#}	M	Chicago Red Stars	(Note: Washington Spirit → Chicago Red Stars. Chicago Red Stars acquired Washington Spirit's highest second-round pick in the 2023 NWSL Draft and $25,000 in allocation money in exchange for the No. 23 pick in the 2022 NWSL Draft. The exact draft pick Chicago Red Stars acquired was confirmed at 17:00 ET on January 11, 2023, to be the No. 14 pick.)	Oklahoma State
Round 2	15	(United States)	Gabrielle Robinson	D	Kansas City Current	(Note: Orlando Pride → Kansas City Current. Kansas City Current acquired the natural second-round pick in the 2023 NWSL Draft and $75,000 in allocation money from Orlando Pride in exchange for Darian Jenkins.)	West Virginia
Round 2	16	(United States)	Kayla Fischer	F	Racing Louisville FC		Ohio State
Round 2	17	(United States)	Brianna Martinez	D	Racing Louisville FC	(Note: Angel City FC → OL Reign → Racing Louisville FC. Racing Louisville FC acquired a second- and a fourth-round pick in the 2023 NWSL Draft, along with $50,000 in allocation money, in exchange for the rights to Tobin Heath. OL Reign had previously acquired the natural second-round pick in the 2023 NWSL Draft and $45,000 in allocation money from Angel City FC in exchange for Madison Hammond.)	Notre Dame
Round 2	18	(United States)	Jordan Silkowitz	G	Kansas City Current	(Note: North Carolina Courage → Kansas City Current. Kansas City Current acquired the natural second- and fourth-round picks in the 2023 NWSL Draft as well as Lynn Williams from North Carolina Courage in exchange for the natural first-round pick in the 2023 NWSL Draft, $200,000 in allocation money, and Katelyn Rowland.)	Iowa State
Round 2	19	(United States)	Shae Holmes	D	OL Reign	(Note: Chicago Red Stars → OL Reign. OL Reign acquired the No. 19 pick of the 2023 NWSL Draft from the Chicago Red Stars in exchange for the No. 23 pick of the 2023 NWSL Draft, a 2023 international slot, and the natural third-round pick of the 2024 NWSL Draft.)	Washington
Round 2	20	(United States)	Sophie Hirst	M	Houston Dash		Harvard
Round 2	21	(United States)	Messiah Bright	F	Orlando Pride	(Note: San Diego Wave FC → Orlando Pride. Orlando Pride had acquired the natural second- or third-round pick in the 2023 NWSL Draft, or allocation money, pending conditions met, from San Diego Wave FC in exchange for Jodie Taylor. The Pride met the trade conditions and acquired the Wave's natural second-round pick in the 2023 NWSL Draft accordingly.)	TCU
Round 2	22	(United States)	Jyllissa Harris	D	Houston Dash	(Note: OL Reign → Orlando Pride → Houston Dash. Houston Dash acquired a second-round pick in the 2023 NWSL Draft and $75,000 in allocation money from Orlando Pride in exchange for Haley Hanson. Orlando Pride had previously acquired the natural second-round pick in the 2023 NWSL Draft, the No. 10 pick in the 2022 NWSL Draft, Celia, and Leah Pruitt from OL Reign in exchange for Phoebe McClernon.)	South Carolina
Round 2	23	(United States)	Ally Schlegel	F	Chicago Red Stars	(Note: Kansas City Current → OL Reign → Chicago Red Stars. Chicago Red Stars acquired the No. 23 pick of the 2023 NWSL Draft, a 2023 international slot, and the natural third-round pick of the 2024 NWSL Draft from OL Reign in exchange for the No. 19 pick of the 2023 NWSL Draft. OL Reign had previously acquired the No. 23 pick in the 2023 NWSL Draft and Elyse Bennett from Kansas City Current in exchange for $150,000 in allocation money.)	Penn State
Round 2	24	(United States)	Lauren DeBeau ^{#}	F	Portland Thorns FC		Michigan State
Round 3	25	(United States)	Tori Hansen	D	Orlando Pride	(Note: NJ/NY Gotham FC → Orlando Pride. Orlando Pride acquired the natural third-round pick in the 2023 NWSL Draft, a first-round pick in the 2022 NWSL Draft, and $50,000 in allocation money from NJ/NY Gotham FC in exchange for the rights to Ashlyn Harris and Ali Krieger.)	North Carolina
Round 3	26	(England)	Nicole Douglas	F	Washington Spirit		Arizona State
Round 3	27	(United States)	Angelina Anderson	G	Angel City FC	(Note: Orlando Pride → Angel City FC. Angel City FC acquired the natural third-round pick in the 2023 NWSL Draft and Brittany Wilson from Orlando Pride in exchange for the natural fourth-round pick in the 2023 NWSL Draft.)	California
Round 3	28	(United States)	Lyza Bosselmann	G	Washington Spirit	(Note: Racing Louisville FC → Washington Spirit. Washington Spirit acquired the No. 28 pick in the 2023 NWSL Draft from Racing Louisville FC in exchange for the No. 29 pick in the 2023 NWSL Draft and $30,000 in allocation money.)	Gonzaga
Round 3	29	(United States)	Jadyn Edwards	M	Racing Louisville FC	(Note: Angel City FC → Orlando Pride → Washington Spirit → Racing Louisville FC. Racing Louisville FC acquired the No. 29 pick of the 2023 NWSL Draft and $30,000 in allocation money from Washington Spirit in exchange for the No. 28 pick of the 2023 NWSL Draft. Washington Spirit acquired the No. 29 and No. 34 picks of the 2023 NWSL Draft from Orlando Pride in exchange for $75,000 in allocation money. Orlando Pride acquired the natural third-round pick in the 2023 NWSL Draft and $15,000 in allocation money from Angel City FC in exchange for Ali Riley.)	New Mexico
Round 3	30	(Panama)	Riley Tanner	F	Washington Spirit	(Note: North Carolina Courage → Houston Dash → Washington Spirit. Washington Spirit acquired the No. 30 pick from Houston Dash in exchange for the No. 32 pick and $30,000 in allocation money. Houston Dash acquired Diana Ordoñez and the No. 30 pick in the 2023 NWSL Draft from North Carolina Courage in exchange for the No. 8 pick in the 2023 NWSL Draft, the natural first-round pick in the 2024 NWSL Draft, a 2023 international spot, and $100,000 in allocation money.)	Alabama
Round 3	31	(United States)	Riley Parker ^{#}	F	Racing Louisville FC	(Note: Chicago Red Stars → Racing Louisville FC. Racing Louisville FC acquired the natural third-round pick in the 2023 NWSL Draft and an international slot in 2022 and 2023 from Chicago Red Stars in exchange for Yūki Nagasato.)	Alabama
Round 3	32	(United States)	Lauren Kozal ^{#}	G	Portland Thorns FC	(Note: Houston Dash → OL Reign → Washington Spirit → Houston Dash → Portland Thorns FC. Portland Thorns FC acquired the No. 32 pick from Houston Dash in exchange for the No. 36 pick and $20,000 in allocation money. Houston Dash acquired No. 32 pick and $30,000 in allocation money from Washington Spirit in exchange for the No. 30 pick. Washington Spirit acquired the No. 32 pick of the 2023 NWSL Draft and the natural first-round pick of the 2024 NWSL Draft from OL Reign in exchange for Emily Sonnett. OL Reign acquired the natural third-round pick in the 2023 NWSL Draft from Houston Dash in exchange for the rights to Ella Dederick.)	Michigan State
Round 3	33	(Hungary)	Lauren Brzykcy ^{#}	G	San Diego Wave FC		UCLA
Round 3	34	(United States)	Lena Silano	F	Washington Spirit	(Note: OL Reign → Houston Dash → Orlando Pride → Washington Spirit. Washington Spirit acquired the No. 29 and No. 34 picks of the 2023 NWSL Draft from Orlando Pride in exchange for $75,000 in allocation money. Orlando Pride acquired a third-round pick in the 2023 NWSL Draft, Megan Montefusco, and $30,000 in allocation money from Houston Dash in exchange for Marisa Viggiano. Houston Dash had previously acquired the natural third-round pick in the 2023 NWSL Draft and $30,000 in allocation money from OL Reign in exchange for the rights to Veronica Latsko.)	Long Beach State
Round 3	35	(United States)	Mykiaa Minniss ^{#}	D	Kansas City Current		Washington State
Round 3	36	(United States)	Lindsi Jennings	D	Houston Dash	(Note: Portland Thorns FC → Houston Dash. Houston Dash acquired the No. 36 pick of the 2023 NWSL Draft and $20,000 in allocation money from Portland Thorns FC in exchange for the No. 32 pick of the 2023 NWSL Draft.)	LSU
Round 4	37	(United States)	Civana Kuhlmann	F	Washington Spirit	(Note: NJ/NY Gotham FC → Washington Spirit. Washington Spirit acquired the natural fourth-round pick in the 2023 NWSL Draft from NJ/NY Gotham FC in exchange for Kumi Yokoyama.)	Colorado
Round 4	38	(United States)	Ella Shamburger ^{#}	D	Kansas City Current	(Note: Washington Spirit → Kansas City Current. Kansas City Current acquired the natural fourth-round pick in the 2023 NWSL Draft and $25,000 in allocation money from Washington Spirit in exchange for Gaby Vincent.)	Vanderbilt
Round 4	39	(United States)	Summer Yates	M	Orlando Pride		Washington
Round 4	40	(United States)	Delaney Graham ^{#}	D	Washington Spirit	(Note: Racing Louisville FC → Washington Spirit. Washington Spirit acquired the 40th overall pick in the 2023 NWSL Draft from Racing Louisville FC in exchange for $25k in allocation money.)	Duke
Round 4	41	(United States)	Kristen Scott ^{#}	F	Orlando Pride	(Note: Angel City FC → Orlando Pride. Orlando Pride acquired the natural fourth-round pick in the 2023 NWSL Draft from Angel City FC in exchange for Brittany Wilson and the natural third-round pick in the 2023 NWSL Draft.)	UCF
Round 4	42	(United States)	Rylan Childers	M	Kansas City Current	(Note: North Carolina Courage → Kansas City Current. Kansas City Current acquired the natural second- and fourth-round picks in the 2023 NWSL Draft as well as Lynn Williams from North Carolina Courage in exchange for the natural first-round pick in the 2023 NWSL Draft, $200,000 in allocation money, and Katelyn Rowland.)	Kansas
Round 4	43	(United States)	Sophie Jones	M	Chicago Red Stars		Duke
Round 4	44	(United States)	Iliana Hocking ^{#}	M	NJ/NY Gotham FC	(Note: Houston Dash → NJ/NY Gotham FC. NJ/NY Gotham FC acquired the natural fourth-round pick in the 2023 NWSL Draft from Houston Dash in exchange for Elizabeth Eddy.)	Arizona
Round 4	45	(United States)	Giovanna DeMarco	M	San Diego Wave FC		Wake Forest
Round 4	46	(United States)	Natalie Viggiano	M	OL Reign	(Note: OL Reign → Racing Louisville FC → OL Reign. OL Reign acquired a fourth-round pick in the 2023 NWSL Draft, along with $30,000 in allocation money, from Racing Louisville FC in exchange for the rights to Wang Shuang. Racing Louisville FC had acquired a second- and a fourth-round pick in the 2023 NWSL Draft, along with $50,000 in allocation money, from OL Reign in exchange for the rights to Tobin Heath.)	Wisconsin
Round 4	47	(United States)	Ashley Orkus ^{#}	G	Kansas City Current		Ole Miss
Round 4	48	(United States)	Madelyn Desiano	D	Houston Dash	(Note: Portland Thorns FC → Houston Dash . Houston Dash acquired the No. 48 pick in the 2023 NWSL Draft from Portland Thorns FC in exchange for the natural third-round pick of 2024 NWSL Draft and $10,000 in allocation money.)	UCLA

=== Notable undrafted players ===
Below is a list of undrafted rookies who appeared in a competitive NWSL game in 2023.

Nat.	Player	Pos.	Original NWSL team	College
(United States)	Chai Cortez	D	San Diego Wave FC	Oregon
(United States)	Sami Feller	D	Chicago Red Stars	Denver
(United States)	Paige Metayer	M	Washington Spirit	California
(United States)	Mackenzie Pluck	M	Angel City FC	Duke
(United States)	Croix Soto	D	Kansas City Current	Oregon
(United States)	McKenzie Weinert	F	OL Reign	Oregon State

== Trades ==
Round 1:

Round 2:

Round 3:

Round 4:

== Summary ==
In 2023, a total of 34 colleges had players selected. Of these, three had a player drafted to the NWSL for the first time: Arizona, Iowa State and New Mexico.

=== Schools with multiple draft selections ===
Selections	Schools
3	Alabama, Duke, Florida State
2	California, Michigan State, Notre Dame, Penn State, UCLA, Virginia, Washington

=== Selections by college athletic conference ===
Conference	Round 1	Round 2	Round 3	Round 4	Total
ACC	7	1	1	3	12
Big Ten	1	3	1	1	6
Big West	0	0	1	0	1
Big 12	0	4	0	1	5
Ivy League	0	1	0	0	1
Mountain West	0	0	1	0	1
Pac-12	1	2	4	4	11
SEC	1	1	3	2	7
The American	0	0	0	1	1
West Coast	1	0	1	0	2
Non-college athlete	1	0	0	0	1

=== Selections by position ===
Position	Round 1	Round 2	Round 3	Round 4	Total
Goalkeeper	0	1	4	1	6
Defender	3	4	3	3	13
Midfielder	2	3	1	6	12
Forward	7	4	4	2	17

== See also ==
- List of drafts held by the NWSL
- List of National Women's Soccer League draftees by college team
- 2023 National Women's Soccer League season
