= 2023 National Women's Soccer League season =

11th season of the National Women's Soccer League

National Women's Soccer League
- Season: 2023
- Dates: March 25 – November 11
- Champions: NJ/NY Gotham FC (1st title)
- NWSL Shield: San Diego Wave FC (1st shield)
- Challenge Cup: North Carolina Courage (2nd cup)
- CONCACAF W Champions Cup: NJ/NY Gotham FC; San Diego Wave FC; Portland Thorns FC
- Matches: 132
- Goals: 339 (2.57 per match)
- Top goalscorer: Sophia Smith (11 goals)
- Best goalkeeper: Casey Murphy (7 shutouts)
- Biggest home win: 5 goals ORL 5–0 CHI (Aug 20)
- Biggest away win: 5 goals CHI 0–5 NC (June 11)
- Highest scoring: 7 goals RGN 5–2 CHI (Apr 22)
- Longest winning run: 4 wins North Carolina Courage (Jun 10 – Jul 1)
- Longest unbeaten run: 7 matches Washington Spirit (Mar 26 – May 13)
- Longest winless run: 6 matches Racing Louisville FC (Mar 26 – May 6)
- Longest losing run: 4 losses Orlando Pride (Mar 26 – Apr 23); Kansas City Current (May 7 – 26)
- Highest attendance: 42,054; RGN 0–2 POR (Jun 5)
- Lowest attendance: 2,356; CHI 4–2 KC (Apr 15)
- Total attendance: 1,423,846
- Average attendance: 10,869
- All statistics correct as of October 15, 2023.

The 2023 National Women's Soccer League season was the eleventh season of the National Women's Soccer League, the top division of women's soccer in the United States. Including the NWSL's two professional predecessors, Women's Professional Soccer (2009–2011) and the Women's United Soccer Association (2001–2003), it was the 17th overall season of FIFA and USSF-sanctioned top division women's soccer in the United States. Twelve teams compete in the league.

The NWSL regular season, comprising 22 games for each team, began on March 25 and ended on October 15, 2023. The playoffs followed from October 22 and ended with the championship match on November 11. For the first time, the NWSL Challenge Cup ran entirely concurrent with the regular season from April to September 9, 2023. NJ/NY Gotham FC won their first league championship by defeating OL Reign in the NWSL Championship at Snapdragon Stadium in San Diego, California.

== Teams, stadiums, and personnel ==
=== Stadiums and locations ===
Team	Stadium	Capacity
Angel City FC	BMO Stadium	22,000
Chicago Red Stars	SeatGeek Stadium	20,000
Houston Dash	Shell Energy Stadium	7,000 (Note: Shell Energy Stadium has a capacity of 22,039, but the maximum capacity for Dash games is restricted to 7,000.)
Kansas City Current	Children's Mercy Park	18,467
NJ/NY Gotham FC	Red Bull Arena	25,000
North Carolina Courage	WakeMed Soccer Park	10,000
OL Reign	Lumen Field	10,000 (Note: Lumen Field has a capacity of 68,740; standard configuration for Reign games seats 10,000 but can expand based on demand for individual games.)
Orlando Pride	Exploria Stadium	25,500
Portland Thorns FC	Providence Park	25,218
Racing Louisville FC	Lynn Family Stadium	11,700 (Note: Seated capacity; full capacity with standing room is 15,304.)
San Diego Wave FC	Snapdragon Stadium	35,000
Washington Spirit	Audi Field	20,000

Locations of the National Women's Soccer League teams in 2023.

=== Personnel and sponsorship ===
Note: All teams use Nike as their kit manufacturer as part of a league-wide sponsorship agreement renewed in November 2021.

Team	Head coach	Captain	Shirt sponsor
Angel City FC	(England) Becki Tweed (interim)	(New Zealand) Ali Riley	DoorDash
Chicago Red Stars	(United States) Ella Masar (interim)	(United States) Alyssa Naeher	CIBC
Houston Dash	(England) Sarah Lowdon (interim)	(Canada) Sophie Schmidt	MD Anderson Cancer Center
Kansas City Current	(Finland) Caroline Sjöblom (interim)	(United States) Lo'eau LaBonta	Saint Luke's Health System
NJ/NY Gotham FC	(Spain) Juan Carlos Amorós	(United States) Ali Krieger	Algorand
North Carolina Courage	(United States) Sean Nahas	(Republic of Ireland) Denise O'Sullivan	Merz Aesthetics
OL Reign	(England) Laura Harvey	(United States) Lauren Barnes	Black Future Co-op Fund
Orlando Pride	(England) Seb Hines	(Brazil) Marta	Orlando Health
Portland Thorns FC	(England) Mike Norris	(Canada) Christine Sinclair	Providence Health & Services
Racing Louisville FC	(Sweden) Kim Björkegren	(United States) Jaelin Howell	GE Appliances
San Diego Wave FC	(England) Casey Stoney	(United States) Alex Morgan	Kaiser Permanente
Washington Spirit	(England) Mark Parsons	(United States) Aubrey Kingsbury	CVS Health

=== Coaching changes ===
Team	Outgoing coach	Manner of departure	Date of vacancy	Position in table	Incoming coach	Date of appointment	Ref.
NJ/NY Gotham FC	(England) Hue Menzies (interim)	End of interim period	October 2, 2022	Preseason	(Spain) Juan Carlos Amorós	November 1, 2022	
Orlando Pride	(England) Seb Hines (interim)	End of interim period	October 2, 2022	Preseason	(England) Seb Hines	November 11, 2022	
Washington Spirit	(United States) Albertin Montoya (interim)	End of interim period	October 2, 2022	Preseason	(England) Mark Parsons	November 21, 2022	
Houston Dash	(Spain) Juan Carlos Amorós (interim)	Resigned	October 28, 2022	Preseason	(England) Sam Laity	December 21, 2022	
Portland Thorns FC	(Canada) Rhian Wilkinson	Resigned	December 2, 2022	Preseason	(England) Mike Norris	January 9, 2023	
Kansas City Current	(England) Matt Potter	Fired	April 19, 2023	11th	(Finland) Caroline Sjöblom (interim)	April 19, 2023	
Angel City FC	(England) Freya Coombe	Fired	June 15, 2023	11th	(England) Becki Tweed (interim)	June 15, 2023	
Houston Dash	(England) Sam Laity	Fired	September 6, 2023	10th	(England) Sarah Lowdon (interim)	September 8, 2023	
Chicago Red Stars	(United States) Chris Petrucelli	Fired	October 10, 2023	12th	(United States) Ella Masar (interim)	October 10, 2023	

== Regular season ==
=== Standings ===
Pos	Team	Pld	W	D	L	GF	GA	GD	Pts	Qualification
1	San Diego Wave FC (S)	22	11	4	7	31	22	+9	37	NWSL Shield, Playoff semifinals, and CONCACAF W Champions Cup
2	Portland Thorns FC	22	10	5	7	42	32	+10	35	Playoff semifinals and W Champions Cup
3	North Carolina Courage	22	9	6	7	29	22	+7	33	Playoff quarterfinals
4	OL Reign	22	9	5	8	29	24	+5	32	Playoff quarterfinals
5	Angel City FC	22	8	7	7	31	30	+1	31	Playoff quarterfinals
6	NJ/NY Gotham FC (C)	22	8	7	7	25	24	+1	31	Playoff quarterfinals
7	Orlando Pride	22	10	1	11	27	28	−1	31	
8	Washington Spirit	22	7	9	6	26	29	−3	30	
9	Racing Louisville FC	22	6	9	7	25	24	+1	27	
10	Houston Dash	22	6	8	8	16	18	−2	26	
11	Kansas City Current	22	8	2	12	30	36	−6	26	
12	Chicago Red Stars	22	7	3	12	28	50	−22	24	

Source: NWSL
Rules for classification: Tiebreakers
(C) Champions and W Champions Cup; (S) NWSL Shield

==== Tiebreakers ====
The initial determining factor for a team's position in the standings is most points earned, with three points earned for a win, one point for a draw, and zero points for a loss. If two or more teams tie in total points total when determining rank, playoff qualification, and seeding, the NWSL uses the following tiebreaker criteria, going down the list until all teams are ranked.

1. Greater goal difference across the entire regular season (against all teams, not just tied teams).
2. Most total wins across the entire regular season (against all teams, not just tied teams).
3. Most goals scored across the entire regular season (against all teams, not just tied teams).
4. Head-to-head results (total points) between the tied teams.
5. Head-to-head most goals scored between the tied teams.
6. Fewest disciplinary points accumulated across the entire regular season (against all teams, not just tied teams).
7. Coin flip (if two teams are tied) or drawing of lots (if three or more teams are tied).

=== Results ===
Home \ Away	CHI	HOU	KC	LA	LOU	NC	NJY	ORL	POR	RGN	SD	WAS
Chicago Red Stars	—	1–2	4–2	2–2	1–0	0–5	1–2	1–0	2–3	0–3	1–0	1–1
Houston Dash	0–1	—	1–1	1–2	0–0	0–1 (Note: Match abandoned at the 52nd minute due to severe thunderstorms in the area.)	1–1	2–0	2–1	0–0	0–3	1–1
Kansas City Current	6–3	0–2	—	0–1	0–2	1–0	2–0	2–0	1–4	1–0	0–2	2–3
Angel City FC	1–2	0–0	3–2	—	2–2	2–1	1–2	0–1	5–1	2–1	0–2	0–1
Racing Louisville FC	3–0	0–1	2–1	1–1	—	1–2	2–0	3–2	2–1	2–2	0–0	2–2
North Carolina Courage	1–1	1–0	1–0	0–0	1–0	—	3–3	3–0	3–3	1–0	0–0	1–2
NJ/NY Gotham FC	2–1	0–2	2–2	0–0	0–0	1–0	—	0–0	2–1	0–2	0–1	2–0
Orlando Pride	5–0	1–0	1–2	1–2	1–0	2–1	0–2	—	3–1	1–0	1–2	2–1
Portland Thorns FC	4–0	1–1	0–1	3–3	2–0	2–1	1–0	4–0	—	2–0	0–2	4–2
OL Reign	5–2	2–0	2–1	4–1	2–2	1–1	1–4	1–0	0–2	—	1–0	0–0
San Diego Wave FC	3–2	1–0	1–2	1–2	2–0	3–1	2–1	1–3	1–1	1–2	—	2–2
Washington Spirit	0–3	0–0	2–1	2–1	1–1	0–1	1–1	0–3	1–1	1–0	3–1	—

Source: NWSL
Legend: Blue = home team win; Yellow = draw; Red = away team win.

== Attendance ==
=== Average home attendances ===
Ranked from highest to lowest average attendance.

Regular season
Team	GP	Attendance	High	Low	Average
San Diego Wave FC	11	227,893	30,854	14,362	20,718
Angel City FC	11	217,313	22,000	16,682	19,756
Portland Thorns FC	11	208,094	25,218	14,972	18,918
OL Reign	11	149,704	42,054	6,132	13,609
Kansas City Current	11	124,878	15,671	9,409	11,353
Washington Spirit	11	119,748	15,479	7,073	10,886
Orlando Pride	11	69,878	8,504	4,290	6,353
NJ/NY Gotham FC	11	69,223	15,058	3,200	6,293
Racing Louisville FC	11	65,989	10,214	4,143	5,999
Houston Dash (Note: The April 28, 2023, match between HOU and NC was abandoned at the 52nd minute before attendance could be reported.)	10	58,569	9,175	4,536	5,857
North Carolina Courage	11	59,225	10,434	4,000	5,384
Chicago Red Stars	11	53,332	8,961	2,356	4,848
Total	131	1,423,846	42,054	2,356	10,869

Updated through 2023 Season

=== Highest attendances ===
Regular season
Rank	Home team	Score	Away team	Attendance	Date	Stadium
1	OL Reign	0–2	Portland Thorns FC	42,054 (Note: The June 3 match between OL Reign and Portland Thorns FC was part of a doubleheader with Seattle Sounders FC. The attendance figure reflects the tickets counted for the Sounders match.)	June 3, 2023	Lumen Field
2	OL Reign	0–0	Washington Spirit	34,130	October 6, 2023	Lumen Field
3	San Diego Wave FC	3–2	Chicago Red Stars	30,854	March 25, 2023	Snapdragon Stadium
4	San Diego Wave FC	2–0	Racing Louisville FC	30,312	October 15, 2023	Snapdragon Stadium
5	San Diego Wave FC	1–2	Angel City FC	25,515	June 17, 2023	Snapdragon Stadium
6	Portland Thorns FC	2–0	OL Reign	25,218	September 16, 2023	Providence Park
7	San Diego Wave FC	1–0	Houston Dash	24,936	September 3, 2023	Snapdragon Stadium
8	San Diego Wave FC	1–2	OL Reign	22,682	June 24, 2023	Snapdragon Stadium
9	Portland Thorns FC	2–1	North Carolina Courage	22,107	August 20, 2023	Providence Park
10	Angel City FC	1–2	NJ/NY Gotham FC	22,000	March 26, 2023	BMO Stadium

Updated through 2023 Season

== Statistical leaders ==
As of October 14, 2023.

=== Top scorers ===
Rank	Player	Club	Goals
1	(United States) Sophia Smith	Portland Thorns FC	11
2	(Brazil) Kerolin	North Carolina Courage	10
3	(Brazil) Debinha	Kansas City Current	9
3	(United States) Ashley Hatch	Washington Spirit	9
5	(United States) Alex Morgan	San Diego Wave FC	7
5	(United States) Morgan Weaver	Portland Thorns FC	7
5	(United States) Lynn Williams	NJ/NY Gotham FC	7
8	(United States) Bethany Balcer	OL Reign	6
8	(United States) Messiah Bright	Orlando Pride	6
8	(United States) Cece Kizer	Kansas City Current	6
8	(Brazil) Adriana Leal da Silva	Orlando Pride	6
8	(United States) Tyler Lussi	North Carolina Courage	6
8	(United States) Jaedyn Shaw	San Diego Wave FC	6
8	(Japan) Hina Sugita	Portland Thorns FC	6

=== Top assists ===
Rank	Player	Club	Assists
1	(United States) Sam Coffey	Portland Thorns FC	8
2	(Brazil) Julia Bianchi	Chicago Red Stars	5
2	(Scotland) Claire Emslie	Angel City FC	5
2	(United States) Alex Morgan	San Diego Wave FC	5
2	(United States) Megan Rapinoe	OL Reign	5
2	(United States) Sophia Smith	Portland Thorns FC	5
7	(Brazil) Adriana Leal da Silva	Orlando Pride	4
7	(France) Clarisse Le Bihan	Angel City FC	4
7	(United States) Alex Loera	Kansas City Current	4
7	(Brazil) Marta	Orlando Pride	4
7	(Mexico) María Sánchez	Houston Dash	4
7	(United States) Morgan Weaver	Portland Thorns FC	4
7	(United States) Christen Westphal	San Diego Wave FC	4

=== Clean sheets ===
Rank	Player	Club	Clean sheets
1	(United States) Casey Murphy	North Carolina Courage	9
1	(Canada) Kailen Sheridan	San Diego Wave FC	9
3	(United States) Jane Campbell	Houston Dash	8
4	(England) Anna Moorhouse	Orlando Pride	7
5	(United States) Bella Bixby	Portland Thorns FC	6
5	(United States) Katie Lund	Racing Louisville FC	6
7	(United States) Aubrey Kingsbury	Washington Spirit	4
7	(United States) Cassie Miller	Kansas City Current	4
7	(United States) Abby Smith	NJ/NY Gotham FC	4
7	(United States) Phallon Tullis-Joyce	OL Reign	4

=== Hat-tricks ===
Player	For	Against	Score	Date	Ref.
(United States) Sophia Smith	Portland Thorns FC	at Kansas City Current	1–4	April 1, 2023	
(Brazil) Kerolin	North Carolina Courage	at Chicago Red Stars	0–5	June 10, 2023	
(United States) Sophia Smith	Portland Thorns FC	vs. Washington Spirit	4–2	June 23, 2023	

== Playoffs ==
The top six teams from the regular season will qualify for the NWSL Championship playoffs, with the top two teams receiving a quarterfinal bye. The playoffs begin with the quarterfinals on October 20, with semifinals scheduled for November 5 and the championship finals match on November 11 at Snapdragon Stadium in San Diego, California.

=== Bracket ===
Quarterfinals
4	OL Reign	1
5	Angel City FC	0
3	North Carolina Courage	0
6	NJ/NY Gotham FC	2

Semifinals
1	San Diego Wave FC	0
4	OL Reign	1
2	Portland Thorns FC	0
6	NJ/NY Gotham FC (a.e.t.)	1

Championship
4	OL Reign	1
6	NJ/NY Gotham FC	2

=== Quarterfinals ===
October 20, 2023
19:00 PDT

OL Reign	1–0	Angel City FC
Latsko 87'	Report

Lumen Field, Seattle, Washington
Attendance: 12,152
Referee: Brad Jensen
October 22, 2023
19:00 EDT

North Carolina Courage	0–2	NJ/NY Gotham FC
	Report	Sheehan 45'; Ryan 90+1'

WakeMed Soccer Park, Cary, North Carolina
Attendance: 4,612
Referee: Katja Koroleva

=== Semifinals ===
November 5, 2023
16:00 PST

Portland Thorns FC	0–1 (a.e.t.)	NJ/NY Gotham FC
	Report	Stengel 107'

Providence Park, Portland, Oregon
Attendance: 25,218
Referee: Danielle Chesky
November 5, 2023
18:30 PST

San Diego Wave FC	0–1	OL Reign
	Report	Latsko 47'

Snapdragon Stadium, San Diego, California
Attendance: 32,262
Referee: Natalie Simon

=== Championship ===
November 11, 2023
17:00 PST

OL Reign	1–2	NJ/NY Gotham FC
Lavelle 29'	Report	Williams 24'; González 45+2'

Snapdragon Stadium, San Diego, California
Attendance: 25,011
Referee: Katja Koroleva

Championship Game MVP: Midge Purce (NJNY)

== Individual awards ==
As of July 10, 2023

=== Annual awards ===
Award	Winner		Nominees	Ref.
Golden Boot	(United States) Sophia Smith (11 G)	Portland Thorns FC	N/A	
Most Valuable Player	(Brazil) Kerolin	North Carolina Courage	(United States) Sam Coffey, POR (Brazil) Debinha, KC (United States) Naomi Girma, SD (United States) Sophia Smith, POR	
Defender of the Year	(United States) Naomi Girma	San Diego Wave FC	(United States) Sarah Gorden, LA (United States) Ali Krieger, NJNY (United States) Kaleigh Kurtz, NCC (United States) Sam Staab, WAS	
Goalkeeper of the Year	(United States) Jane Campbell	Houston Dash	(United States) Katie Lund, LOU (Canada) Kailen Sheridan, SD	
Rookie of the Year	(United States) Jenna Nighswonger	NJ/NY Gotham FC	(United States) Messiah Bright, ORL (United States) Alyssa Thompson, LA	
Coach of the Year	(Spain) Juan Carlos Amorós	NJ/NY Gotham FC	(England) Casey Stoney, SD (England) Becki Tweed, LA	

==== Teams of the Year ====
Announced November 6, 2023

Best XI

POSITION	PLAYER	CLUB
Goalkeeper	(United States) Jane Campbell	Houston Dash
Defender	(United States) Naomi Girma	San Diego Wave FC
Defender	(United States) Ali Krieger	NJ/NY Gotham FC
Defender	(United States) Sarah Gorden	Angel City FC
Defender	(United States) Sam Staab	Washington Spirit
Midfielder/Forward	(United States) Sam Coffey	Portland Thorns FC
Midfielder/Forward	(Brazil) Debinha	Kansas City Current
Midfielder/Forward	(United States) Jaedyn Shaw	San Diego Wave FC
Midfielder/Forward	(Brazil) Kerolin	North Carolina Courage
Midfielder/Forward	(United States) Sophia Smith	Portland Thorns FC
Midfielder/Forward	(United States) Lynn Williams	NJ/NY Gotham FC

Second XI

POSITION	PLAYER	CLUB
Goalkeeper	(Canada) Kailen Sheridan	San Diego Wave FC
Defender	(United States) Emily Fox	North Carolina Courage
Defender	(United States) Kaleigh Kurtz	North Carolina Courage
Defender	(United States) Jenna Nighswonger	NJ/NY Gotham FC
Defender	(United States) M.A. Vignola	Angel City FC
Midfielder/Forward	(United States) Savannah DeMelo	Racing Louisville FC
Midfielder/Forward	(United States) Savannah McCaskill	Angel City FC
Midfielder/Forward	(Republic of Ireland) Denise O'Sullivan	North Carolina Courage
Midfielder/Forward	(United States) Ashley Hatch	Washington Spirit
Midfielder/Forward	(United States) Alex Morgan	San Diego Wave FC
Midfielder/Forward	(United States) Trinity Rodman	Washington Spirit

=== Monthly awards ===
==== Player of the Month ====
Month	Player	Team	Ref.
March/April	(United States) Sophia Smith	Portland Thorns FC	
May	(United States) Savannah DeMelo	Racing Louisville FC	
June	(United States) Sophia Smith (2)	Portland Thorns FC	
July	(United States) Savannah McCaskill	Angel City FC	
August	(United States) Messiah Bright	Orlando Pride	
September/October	(United States) Savannah McCaskill (2)	Angel City FC	

==== Rookie of the Month ====
Month	Player	Team	Ref.
March/April	(United States) Alyssa Thompson	Angel City FC	
May	(United States) Jenna Nighswonger	NJ/NY Gotham FC	
June	(United States) Paige Metayer	Washington Spirit	
July	(United States) Jenna Nighswonger (2)	NJ/NY Gotham FC	
August	(United States) Messiah Bright	Orlando Pride	
September/October	(United States) Alexa Spaanstra	Kansas City Current	

==== Team of the Month ====
Month	Goalkeeper	Defenders	Midfielders	Forwards	Ref.
March/April	(United States) Phallon Tullis-Joyce, RGN	(United States) Emily Fox, NC; (United States) Naomi Girma, SD; (United States) Becky Sauerbrunn, POR; (United States) Sam Staab, WAS	(Brazil) Debinha, KC (3); (United States) Crystal Dunn, POR; (Wales) Jess Fishlock, RGN	(United States) Bethany Balcer, RGN; (United States) Sophia Smith, POR; (United States) Lynn Williams, NJY	
May	(United States) Abby Smith, NJY	(Brazil) Bruninha, NJY; (United States) Naomi Girma (2), SD; (United States) Sam Staab (2), WAS; (United States) Kylie Strom, ORL	(United States) Savannah DeMelo, LOU; (United States) Crystal Dunn (2), POR; (United States) Jenna Nighswonger, NJY	(United States) Veronica Latsko, RGN; (United States) Megan Rapinoe, RGN; (United States) Lynn Williams (2), NJY	
June	(United States) Casey Murphy, NC	(New Zealand) Abby Erceg, LOU; (United States) Sofia Huerta, OL; (United States) Kaleigh Kurtz, NC; (United States) M.A. Vignola, LA	(United States) Sam Coffey, POR; (Brazil) Debinha, KC (2); (United States) Savannah DeMelo, LOU (2)	(Brazil) Kerolin, NC; (United States) Sophia Smith, POR (2); (United States) Lynn Williams, NJY (3)	
July	(United States) Emily Boyd, CHI	(United States) Malia Berkely, NC; (New Zealand) Abby Erceg, LOU (2); (United States) Sarah Gorden, LA; (United States) Paige Monaghan, LOU	(United States) Savannah McCaskill, LA; (Japan) Narumi Miura, NC; (United States) Jenna Nighswonger, NJY (2)	(United States) Ashley Hatch, WAS; (United States) Kristen Hamilton, KC; (United States) Midge Purce, NJY	
August	(United States) Adrianna Franch, KC	(United States) Abby Dahlkemper, SD; (United States) Casey Krueger, CHI; (United States) Jenna Nighswonger, NJY (3); (United States) Kylie Strom, ORL	(United States) Kerry Abello, ORL; (United States) Sam Coffey, POR (2); (United States) Lo'eau LaBonta, KC	(United States) Messiah Bright, ORL; (United States) Kristen Hamilton, KC (2); (United States) Morgan Weaver, POR	
September / October	(United States) Jane Campbell, HOU	(United States) Caprice Dydasco, HOU; (United States) Naomi Girma, SD (3); (United States) Sarah Gorden, LA (2); (United States) M.A. Vignola, LA	(United States) Sam Coffey, POR (3); (Brazil) Debinha, KC (3); (United States) Savannah McCaskill, LA (2)	(Spain) Esther González, NJY; (Brazil) Kerolin, NC (2); (United States) Jaedyn Shaw, SD	

=== Weekly awards ===
Week	Player of the Week		Save of the Week		Ref.
Week	Player	Club	Player	Club	Ref.
1	(United States) Lynn Williams	NJ/NY Gotham FC	Not awarded		
2	(United States) Sophia Smith	Portland Thorns FC	Not awarded		
3	(United States) Phallon Tullis-Joyce	OL Reign	Not awarded		
4	(United States) Lynn Williams (2)	NJ/NY Gotham FC	(United States) Abby Smith	NJ/NY Gotham FC	
5	(Brazil) Debinha	Kansas City Current	(United States) Abby Smith (2)	NJ/NY Gotham FC	
6	(United States) Crystal Dunn	Portland Thorns FC	(United States) Katie Lund	Racing Louisville FC	
7	(United States) Abby Smith	NJ/NY Gotham FC	(United States) Abby Smith (3)	NJ/NY Gotham FC	
8	(United States) Lynn Williams (3)	NJ/NY Gotham FC	(United States) Alyssa Naeher	Chicago Red Stars	
9	(Brazil) Bruninha	NJ/NY Gotham FC	(United States) Alyssa Naeher (2)	Chicago Red Stars	
10	(United States) Sydney Leroux	Angel City FC	(Brazil) Bruninha (United States) Abby Smith (4)	NJ/NY Gotham FC	
11	(Brazil) Kerolin	North Carolina Courage	(United States) Phallon Tullis-Joyce	OL Reign	
12	(United States) Tara McKeown	Washington Spirit	(United States) Phallon Tullis-Joyce (2)	OL Reign	
13	(United States) Sophia Smith (2)	Portland Thorns FC	(United States) Phallon Tullis-Joyce (3)	OL Reign	
14	(United States) Julie Doyle	Orlando Pride	(United States) Abby Smith (5)	NJ/NY Gotham FC	
15	(United States) Messiah Bright	Orlando Pride	(United States) Abby Smith (6)	NJ/NY Gotham FC	
