= Cassie Miller =

American soccer player (born 1995)

- Miller with the Seattle Reign in 2026

Personal information
- Full name: Carissa Xenia Miller
- Date of birth: April 28, 1995 (age 31)
- Place of birth: Cave Creek, Arizona, United States
- Height: 5 ft 11 in (1.80 m)
- Position: Goalkeeper

Team information
- Current team: Seattle Reign
- Number: 38

Youth career
- 2002–2004: Gilbert SC
- 2005: Tempe Pros SC
- 2005: SC del Sol
- 2006–2012: Sereno SC

College career
Years	Team	Apps	(Gls)
2013–2017	Florida State Seminoles	94	(0)

Senior career*
Years	Team	Apps	(Gls)
2014	Toronto Lady Lynx		
2015	Colorado Rush		
2016	Seattle Sounders Women		
2017	Chicago Red Stars Reserves		
2018–2019	PSV	8	(0)
2019–2020	Apollon Limassol	0	(0)
2020–2021	Chicago Red Stars	15	(0)
2020	→ Apollon Ladies (loan)	0	(0)
2022–2023	Kansas City Current	12	(0)
2024	NJ/NY Gotham FC	4	(0)
2025–	Seattle Reign	5	(0)

International career
2012	United States U17	1	(0)
2013–2017	United States U20		
- * Club domestic league appearances and goals as of 16:37, November 8, 2026 (UTC)

Carissa Xenia Miller (born April 28, 1995) is an American professional soccer player who plays as a goalkeeper for Seattle Reign FC of the National Women's Soccer League (NWSL). She previously played in the NWSL for the Chicago Red Stars, Kansas City Current, and NJ/NY Gotham FC. She played college soccer for the Florida State Seminoles and helped the team win their first national championship in 2014.

== Youth career ==
Miller grew up in Arizona and played youth soccer with Sereno Soccer Club, where she was teammates with Julie Johnston.

== College career ==
Miller played for the Florida State Seminoles women's soccer team from 2014 to 2017. Playing every minute in goal for the 2014 Seminoles team, Florida State recorded a 24–1–1 record and won the program's first College Cup. As of 2022, her 19 solo shutouts in the 2014 season were tied for the NCAA Division I all-time record with Katelyn Rowland and Casey Murphy.

== Club career ==
Miller played for teams in the pro-am USL W-League and Women's Premier Soccer League, including the Toronto Lady Lynx in 2014, Colorado Rush in 2015, Seattle Sounders Women in 2016, and Chicago Red Stars Reserves in 2017.

Miller declined to register for the 2018 NWSL College Draft and instead sought to begin her professional career in Europe.

In January 2018, Miller signed an 18-month contract to play for Dutch team PSV Eindhoven.

After her contract expired at PSV, Miller signed with Cypriot club Apollon Ladies FC, where she sought to compete in the 2019–20 UEFA Women's Champions League.

On June 23, 2020, NWSL club Chicago Red Stars signed Miller for the 2020 NWSL Challenge Cup, where she made her NWSL debut on July 1, 2020. After finishing as runners-up in the cup, the Red Stars loaned Miller back to Apollon Ladies for the NWSL offseason. The Red Stars rostered Miller as the team's third keeper before the 2021 season, but injuries to backup Emily Boyd while on loan and to starter Alyssa Naeher at the 2020 Summer Olympics resulted in Miller becoming the team's starting goalkeeper for the end of the season. The Red Stars qualified for the playoffs, and Miller recorded two post-season shutouts against NJ/NY Gotham FC and Portland Thorns FC before drawing 1–1 against Washington Spirit in regulation time of the championship match and losing 2–1 after extra time.

In February 2022, the Red Stars traded Miller to Kansas City Current in exchange for $75,000 in NWSL allocation money. Miller served as the backup keeper to Adrianna Franch in the 2022 season, making two appearances and recording one shutout. In the 2023 season, Franch was benched by interim head coach Caroline Sjöblom in favor of Miller.

On January 23, 2024, Miller was traded to Gotham FC in exchange for $70,000 in allocation money as well as a $30,000 intra-league transfer fee.

On December 20, 2024, Miller joined Seattle Reign as part of a trade that also saw Lynn Williams move to Seattle and Jaelin Howell join Gotham. She debuted for the Reign on July 4, 2026, starting against the North Carolina Courage in place of injured starter Claudia Dickey.

== International career ==
Miller was a member of the United States women's national under-17 soccer team that won the 2012 CONCACAF Women's U-17 Championship, and was named to the team's roster for the 2012 FIFA U-17 Women's World Cup.
