= Isabelle Harvey =

Canadian soccer player

Personal information
- Date of birth: 27 March 1975 (age 51)
- Place of birth: Hauterive, Quebec, Canada
- Height: 1.58 m (5 ft 2 in)
- Position: Forward

College career
Years	Team	Apps	(Gls)
1996–2000	USC Trojans		(48)

International career^{‡}
1998–2004	Canada	44	(3)
- ‡ National team caps and goals as of 19 June 1999 (before the 1999 FIFA Women's World Cup)

Isabelle Harvey (born 27 March 1975) is a Canadian soccer player who played as a forward for the Canada women's national soccer team. She was part of the team at the 1999 FIFA Women's World Cup.

== Collegiate career ==
Harvey scored 48 career goals for the USC Trojans women's soccer team from 1996 to 2000, a program record that stood until it was broken by Penelope Hocking in 2022.
