= Mykiaa Minniss =

American soccer player (born 2000)

Personal information
- Full name: Mykiaa Nichole Minniss
- Date of birth: June 11, 2000 (age 26)
- Height: 5 ft 11 in (1.80 m)
- Position: Center back

Youth career
- Real Colorado
- Real National
- Pride Predators

College career
Years	Team	Apps	(Gls)
2018–2022	Washington State Cougars	104	(1)

Mykiaa Nichole Minniss (born June 11, 2000) is an American former soccer player who played as a center back. She played college soccer for the Washington State Cougars before being selected by the Kansas City Current in the third round of the 2023 NWSL Draft.

== Early life ==
Minniss grew up in Colorado Springs, Colorado, as the youngest of five siblings. Her brother, Xavier Ford, played basketball professionally in Europe, while one of her parents played soccer collegiately at Dana College. Minniss played club soccer for Real Colorado's development academy in addition to Real National and Pride Predators 99. She attended Doherty High School, where she earned three varsity letters each for soccer and basketball and won league championships in both sports. With the soccer team, she picked up all-league and all-state honors across multiple years. Despite entering college as a defender, Minniss was also an offensive threat for Doherty, earning two Golden Boot awards.

== College career ==
As a freshman in 2018, Minniss quickly inserted herself into the Washington State Cougars' starting lineup at central defense. Two weeks into her rookie season, she scored her first collegiate goal and also earned Pac-12 Defensive Player of the Week honors. She went on to be named to the Pac-12 All-Freshman team after making 19 starts and playing every minute of the campaign before a brief injury midway through the season. The following year, Minniss continued to be a defensive leader for the Cougars. On November 29, 2019, she scored the overtime game-winner against South Carolina to send Washington State to its first-ever NCAA College Cup.

In the 2021 spring season, Minniss was named to the All-Pac-12 third team after leading all Cougars field players in minutes. Once the fall came around, she earned All-Pac-12 first team and all-region first team honors after leading the entire team in minutes en route to 13 shutouts, the second-best single-season figure in program history. In 2022, Minniss returned to Washington State for a fifth year, taking advantage of the extra season of NCAA eligibility offered to student-athletes following the COVID-19 pandemic. She started the year on the preseason Mac Hermann Trophy watchlist, and ended it on the All-Pac-12 and all-region third teams. She departed from Washington State having played over 8,300 minutes. She also recorded 92 career starts, setting a program record for field players.

== Club career ==
The Kansas City Current selected Minniss in the third round of the 2023 NWSL Draft (35th overall). Minniss reported to the Current's preseason training camp, but was removed from the squad ahead of Kansas City's roster update in March 2023. Minniss then spent a brief stint as a trialist with the Orlando Pride.

In April 2023, Minniss' mother shared a social media post claiming that Minniss had been mistreated by the Kansas City Current. She alleged that Minniss had to pay for her own flight and provide for her own meals in her first week at camp, before being abruptly waived without any reasoning or feedback, in addition to other instances of sub-professional treatment. Minniss' mother alleged that the experience caused both Minniss' physical and mental health to suffer, leading her to no longer enjoy soccer.

== International career ==
In December 2019, Minniss received a call-up to the United States under-20 national team for a training camp in Lakewood Ranch, Florida.

== Honors and awards ==
Individual

- First-team All-Pac 12: 2021
- Third-team All-Pac 12: 2020, 2022
- Pac-12 All-Freshman team: 2018
