= Gabrielle Robinson =

American soccer player (born 2001)

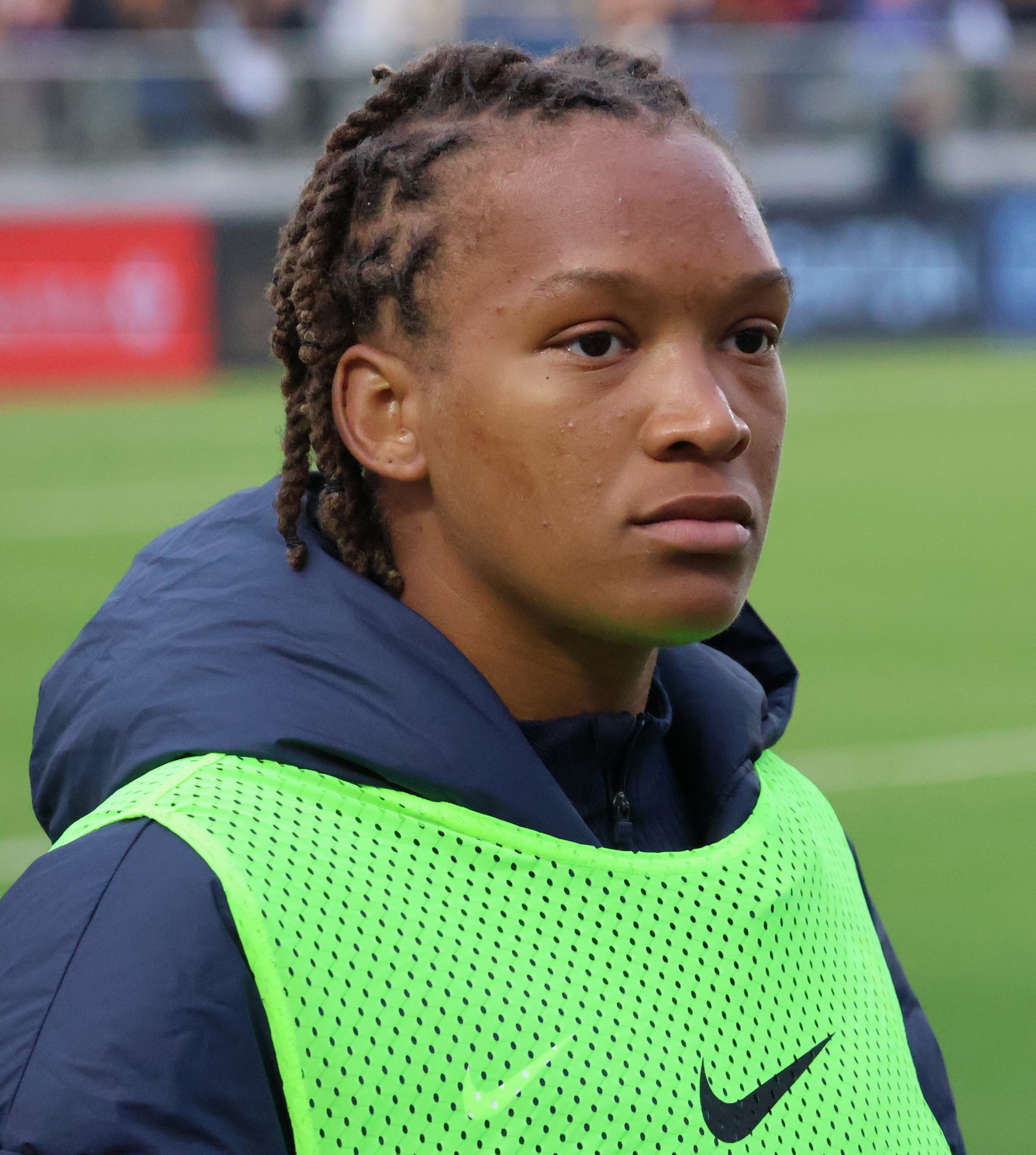
- Robinson with the Kansas City Current in 2026

Personal information
- Date of birth: June 18, 2001 (age 25)
- Height: 5 ft 8 in (1.73 m)
- Position: Center back

Team information
- Current team: Kansas City Current
- Number: 24

College career
Years	Team	Apps	(Gls)
2019–2022	West Virginia Mountaineers	78	(2)

Senior career*
Years	Team	Apps	(Gls)
2023–	Kansas City Current	62	(1)

International career
2016	United States U-15		
- * Club domestic league appearances and goals as of 16:49, November 14, 2026 (UTC)

Gabrielle Robinson (born June 18, 2001) is an American professional soccer player who plays as a center back for the Kansas City Current of the National Women's Soccer League (NWSL). She played college soccer for the West Virginia Mountaineers and was selected by the Current in the second round of the 2023 NWSL Draft.

== Early life ==
Robinson was raised in Springfield, Virginia, the daughter of Don and Rita Robinson, and has two siblings. She is black. Her mother was a cheerleader and her father played baseball. She followed her brother into soccer and eventually chose to focus on soccer over basketball. She attended South County High School, where she ran track and played basketball. She played club soccer for Braddock Road Youth Club, where she appeared for the club's under-20 side at age 13, and then joined the Washington Spirit Academy in the Girls' Development Academy in 2017. She committed to play at West Virginia University that year.

== College career ==
Robinson was a four-year starter for the West Virginia Mountaineers from 2019 to 2022, starting all 78 games. She was named the team's Defensive Player of the Year as a freshman in 2019. She was twice recognized as the Big 12 Conference Defensive Player of the Week and was named second-team All-Big 12 in her senior year, when she helped win the 2022 Big 12 tournament.

== Club career ==
Robinson with the Kansas City Current in 2026

Robinson was selected by the Current with the 15th overall pick in the second round of the 2023 NWSL Draft, the team's third pick of the night. She was signed to a one-year contract with a one-year option. She made her professional debut starting in the opening matchday against the North Carolina Courage on March 25, 2023. She played a large role in the Current's season, appearing in 20 of 22 regular-season games and all 7 of the Current's games in the NWSL Challenge Cup. She finished her debut season as the leader among NWSL rookies in shots blocked, interceptions, and clearances. After the season, she signed a new three-year contract with the Current.

Robinson scored her first career goal in a 3–3 draw to Racing Louisville on May 18, 2024. The following week, however, she suffered an anterior cruciate ligament injury during the game against the Utah Royals, ending her season after 11 games started.

After rehabbing for over a year, Robinson was taken off the injury list and signed a new three-year contract with the Current on August 22, 2025. She returned to the field the next day against the Portland Thorns, entering the game during stoppage time and being ejected minutes later for a hard foul.

== International career ==
Robinson trained with the United States youth national team at the under-15 and under-17 levels. She won the 2016 CONCACAF Girls' U-15 Championship and was named to the tournament's Best XI roster as a left winger.

== Honors ==
West Virginia Mountaineers

- Big 12 tournament: 2022

Kansas City Current

- NWSL Championship: 2026
- NWSL Shield: 2025
- NWSL x Liga MX Femenil Summer Cup: 2024

Individual

- Second-team All-Big 12: 2022
- Big 12 tournament all-tournament team: 2022
