= USC Trojans women's soccer =

American college soccer team

- 2026 USC Trojans women's soccer team
- Founded: 1993; 33 years ago
- University: University of Southern California
- Athletic director: Jennifer Cohen
- Head coach: Jane Alukonis (1st season)
- Conference: Big Ten
- Location: Los Angeles, California, US, US
- Stadium: Rawlinson Stadium (capacity: 2,500)
- Nickname: Trojans
- Colors: Cardinal and gold
Home	Away

NCAA tournament championships
- 2007, 2016

NCAA tournament College Cup
- 2007, 2016

NCAA tournament Quarterfinals
- 2007, 2016, 2019

NCAA tournament Round of 16
- 2007, 2008, 2015, 2016, 2018, 2019

NCAA tournament Round of 32
- 1998, 1999, 2000, 2002, 2005, 2006, 2007, 2008, 2010, 2015, 2016, 2017, 2018, 2019

NCAA tournament appearances
- 1998, 1999, 2000, 2001, 2002, 2003, 2005, 2006, 2007, 2008, 2009, 2010, 2014, 2015, 2016, 2017, 2018, 2019, 2020, 2021

The USC Trojans women's soccer team represents the University of Southern California in National Collegiate Athletic Association Division I women's soccer. The team competes in the Big Ten Conference. The Trojans won national championships in 2007 and 2016.

== History ==
Former USC women's soccer coaches Ali Khosroshahin and Laura Janke were indicted as part of the 2019 college admissions bribery scandal, for allegedly accepting bribes totaling hundreds of thousands of dollars to facilitate the admission of students to USC as soccer players recruited to the USC women's soccer team, despite their never having played soccer, and pled guilty.

== Players ==
=== Current squad ===
As of November 21, 2025

Note: Flags indicate national team as defined under FIFA eligibility rules; some limited exceptions apply. Players may hold more than one non-FIFA nationality.

No.	Pos.	Nation	Player
1	GK	USA	Bella Grust
2	DF	USA	Alyssa Gonzalez
4	DF	USA	Molly McDougal
5	FW	USA	Muphy Walsh
6	MF	USA	Eleanor Morrissey
7	MF	USA	Jaiden Rodriguez
8	MF	USA	Sophia Cavaliere
9	FW	USA	Charlotte Ward
10	MF	ESP	Lauder Headrick
11	FW/DF	USA	Lily Biddulph
12	FW	USA	Faith George
13	GK	USA	Lana Gibbs
14	GK	USA	Phoebe Carver

No.	Pos.	Nation	Player
15	FW	MEX	Maribel Flores
16	DF	USA	Kensington Morgan
18	MF	USA	Ines Derrien
19	FW	JPN	Hana Mizumoto
20	MF	POR	Ines Simas
21	FW	USA	Amalie Pianim
22	DF	USA	Edra Bello
23	MF	SWE	Alexandra Larsson
24	DF	USA	Alison Hou
27	F/MF	USA	Katie Park
28	DF	USA	Peyton Nakagawara
30	DF	USA	Cassie Bibby
33	DF	USA	Tanna Schornstein
54	FW	USA	Jaiden Anderson

=== All-time records ===
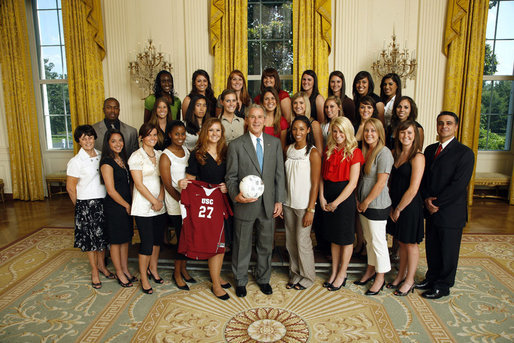
The 2008 NCAA champions with President George W. Bush at the White House

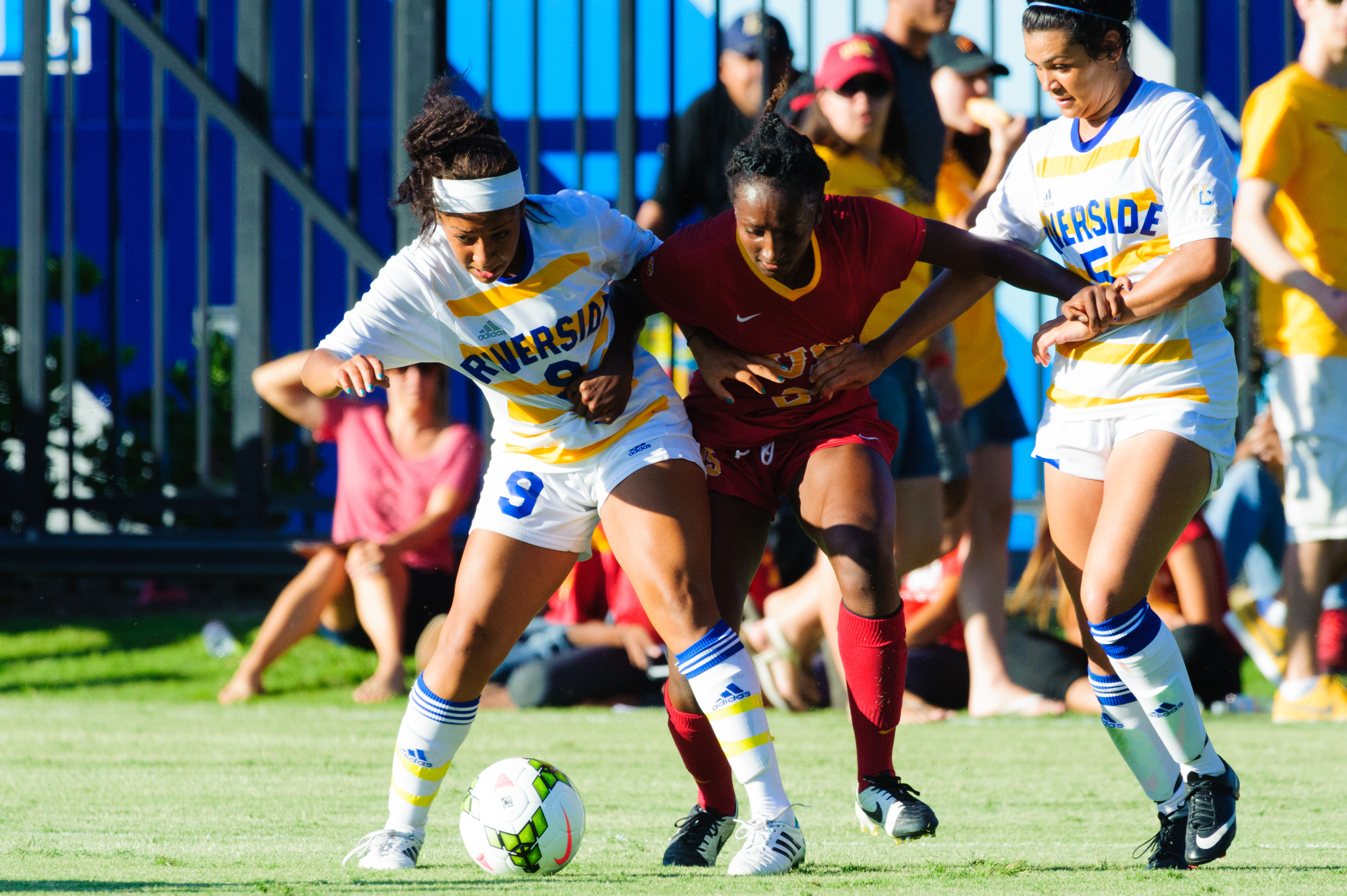
USC v Riverside in 2014

Years	Coach	Records
1993–1995	Karen Stanley	21–30–6 (.421)
1996–2006	Jim Millinder	136–70–21 (.645)
2007–2013	Ali Khosroshahin	82–53–15 (.597)
2014–2021	Keidane McAlpine	61–19–9 (.736)
2022–	Jane Alukonis	14-1-2 (.882)

=== Year-by-year statistical leaders ===
Year-by-Year Statistical Leaders
Year	Goals Leader	G	Assists Leader	A
1993	Amy Peterson	8	Maggie Merritt	6
1994	Erin Bailey	10	Maggie Merritt	5
1995	Tara Koleski	11	Tara Koleski	10
1996	Isabelle Harvey	20	Isabelle Harvey	11
1997	Courtney Barham	14	Kim Clark	17
1998	Kim Clark	10	Isabelle Harvey	12
1999	Isabelle Harvey	11	Kim Clark	9
2000	Jessica Edwards	11	Jessica Edwards	7
2000	Jessica Edwards	11	Isabelle Harvey	7
2001	Shannon Cross	4	Kelly Blais	3
2001	Brittany Savelkoul	4	Ali Fennell	3
2002	Ali Fennell	9	Ashley Casas	3
2003	Rosie Tantillo	7	Ashley Casas	4
2004	Rosie Tantillo	9	Jocelyn Leche	5
2005	Amy Rodriguez	9	Rosie Tantillo	11
2006	Rosie Tantillo	5	Rosie Tantillo	9
2007	Amy Rodriguez	10	Ashli Sandoval	11
2008	Amy Rodriguez	8	Ashli Sandoval	9
2009	Alyssa Dávila	9	Carly Butcher	5
2009	Alyssa Dávila	9	Alyssa Dávila	5
2010	Ashli Sandoval	6	Karter Haug	6
2011	Elizabeth Eddy	4	Brittany Kerridge	9
2012	Samantha Johnson	5	Marlee Carrillo	5
2012	Jordan Marada	5	Jordan Marada	5
2013	Elizabeth Eddy	6	Kayla Mills	8
2014	Alex Quincey	10	Jamie Fink	6
2015	Morgan Andrews	12	Mandy Freeman	6
2015	Morgan Andrews	12	Kayla Mills	6
2016	Morgan Andrews	10	Leah Pruitt	6
2016	Alex Anthony	10	Leah Pruitt	6
2016	Katie Johnson	10	Leah Pruitt	6
2017	Alex Anthony	8	Savannah DeMelo	5
2017	Alex Anthony	8	Tara McKeown	5
2018	Penelope Hocking	14	Savannah DeMelo	10
2019	Penelope Hocking	18	Natalie Jacobs	9
2020	Penelope Hocking	10	Tara McKeown	8
2021	Croix Bethune	16	Croix Bethune	10
2022	Croix Bethune	8	Croix Bethune	9
2023	Kayla Colbert	6	Kayla Colbert	6
2023	Maribel Flores	6	Izzy Kimberly	6
2023	Helena Sampaio	6	Zoe Burns	6
2024	Maile Hayes	11	Helena Sampaio	7

== Coaches ==
=== Current staff ===
Years	Coach
Head coach	Jane Alukonis
Assistant coach	Sugar Shinohara
Assistant coach	Ahmad Brown
Goalkeepers coach	Megan Hinz
