= Penelope Hocking =

American soccer player (born 1999)

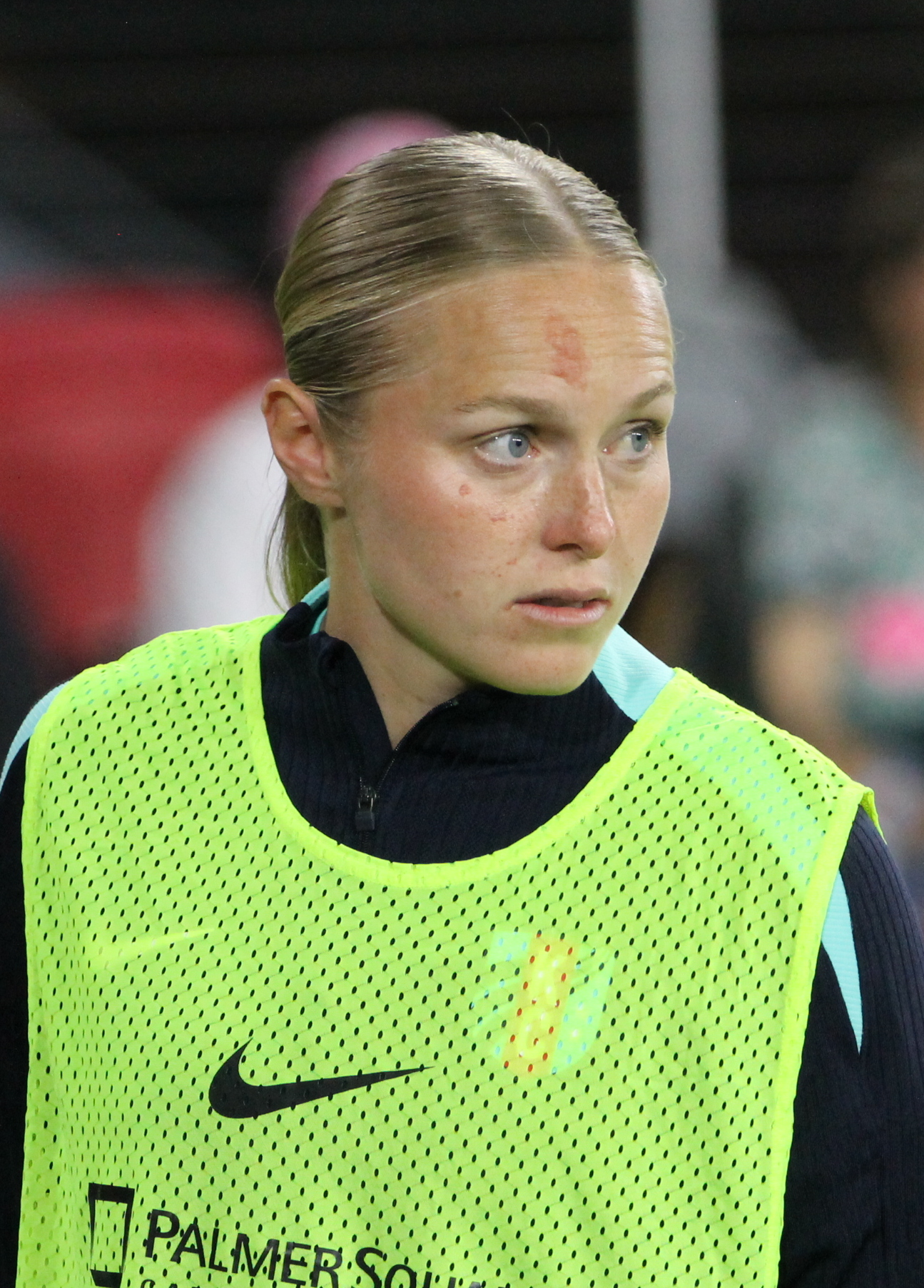
- Hocking with the Kansas City Current in 2026

Personal information
- Full name: Penelope Elizabeth Hocking
- Date of birth: December 29, 1999 (age 26)
- Place of birth: Anaheim, California, United States
- Height: 5 ft 5 in (1.65 m)
- Position: Forward

Team information
- Current team: Kansas City Current
- Number: 55

Youth career
- So Cal Blues

College career
Years	Team	Apps	(Gls)
2018–2021	USC Trojans	72	(54)
2022	Penn State Nittany Lions	23	(7)

Senior career*
Years	Team	Apps	(Gls)
2023–2024	Chicago Red Stars	29	(7)
2024–2025	Bay FC	26	(6)
2026–	Kansas City Current	18	(0)

International career^{‡}
2018	United States U20		
2022	United States U23		
- * Club domestic league appearances and goals as of 16:48, November 14, 2026 (UTC) ‡ National team caps and goals as of April 15, 2023

Penelope Elizabeth Hocking (born December 29, 1999) is an American professional soccer player who plays as a forward for the Kansas City Current of the National Women's Soccer League (NWSL). She played college soccer for the USC Trojans and the Penn State Nittany Lions, setting the Trojans career scoring record and earning first-team All-American honors. She was selected by the Chicago Red Stars in the first round of the 2023 NWSL Draft. She also played for Bay FC.

== Early life ==
Hocking grew up in Anaheim, California, and played high school soccer for Canyon High School. She played youth soccer for SoCal Blues, with which she won the 2015 ECNL U15 National Championship.

== College career ==
=== USC Trojans ===
Hocking played NCAA Division I women's soccer for the USC Trojans from 2018 to 2021. She was named the Pac-12 Conference freshman of the year in 2018, three-time All-Pac-12 from 2019 to 2021, two-time Pac 12 forward of the year in 2020 and 2021, and first-team All-American in 2020. She set a program record for career goals scored on October 7, 2021, with her 49th, surpassing the previous record held by Isabelle Harvey since 2000. She finished her career with the Trojans with 54 goals scored, at the time the 12th most in Pac-12 history, in her 72 career games played.

=== Penn State Nittany Lions ===
In 2022, Hocking transferred to Penn State to play her extra year of NCAA eligibility granted by the COVID-19 pandemic. She scored seven goals, and her 11 assists tied for the Big Ten Conference lead for the season.

== Club career ==
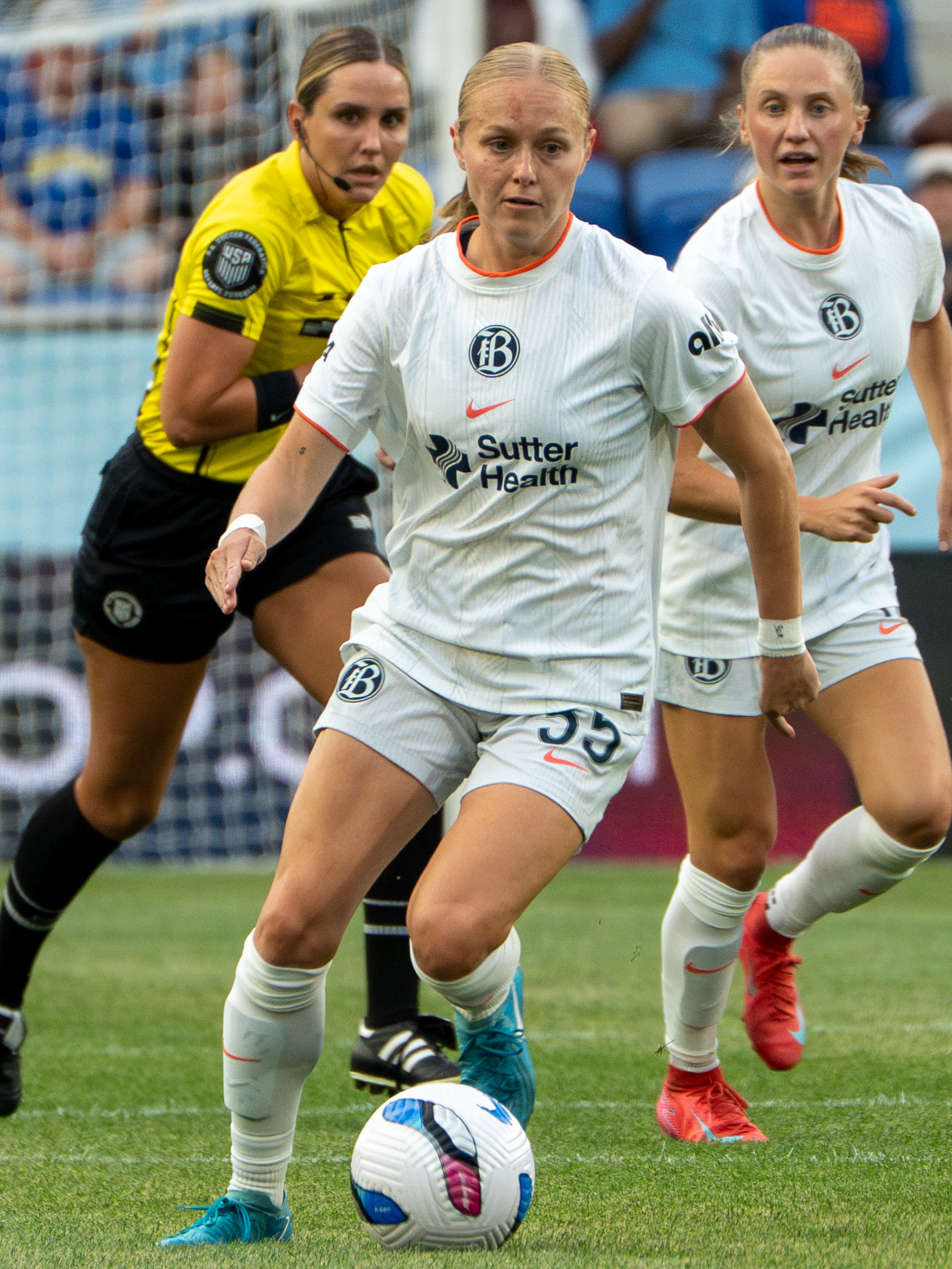
Hocking with Bay FC in 2025

=== Chicago Red Stars ===
National Women's Soccer League (NWSL) club Chicago Red Stars selected Hocking with the seventh overall pick in the 2023 NWSL Draft. On March 20, 2023, Hocking signed a three-year contract with the Red Stars, with an option for a fourth year.

On March 25, 2023, Hocking made her debut for the Red Stars in a 3–2 loss against San Diego Wave FC as a starter. On April 15, in her third start and appearance, Hocking scored her first professional goals as a brace against Kansas City Current in a 4–2 victory.

=== Bay FC ===
On August 31, 2024, Chicago traded Hocking to fellow NWSL side Bay FC for a $350,000 transfer fee, one of the largest in women's soccer history. The trade was made so that Hocking could play for a team closer to her home.

=== Kansas City Current ===
On March 11, 2026, Hocking was traded to the Kansas City Current in exchange for $350,000 in intraleague transfer funds. She made her debut for the club in their opening game of the 2026 season, coming on as a substitute in a 2–1 win over the Utah Royals on March 14, 2026. On March 23, 2026, it was announced that Hocking had signed a three-year contract with the Current, with a club option for a further one-year extension.

== International career ==
Hocking played for the United States women's national under-20 soccer team and competed in the 2018 FIFA U-20 Women's World Cup. She was also named to the under-23 roster for training camp in January 2022 and also for the 2022 Thorns Spring Invitational pre-season tournament against NWSL teams in March 2022.

== Personal life ==
Hocking's parents are former Cypress College basketball player Venetta Dorlis and former Major League Baseball player Denny Hocking. Her paternal grandmother was a youth soccer coach. Hocking has a fraternal twin sister, Iliana, and they were the first twins born to a member of the Minnesota Twins. Penelope and Iliana played together at Canyon High School.

Penelope and Iliana were the first sisters selected in the same NWSL Draft. Iliana played collegiate soccer as a midfielder for the Arizona Wildcats, a Pac-12 rival of USC that pitted the sisters against each other. Iliana was drafted by NJ/NY Gotham FC with the 44th overall pick.

At the University of Southern California, Hocking majored in computer science.

== Career statistics ==
As of match played August 2, 2025

Appearances and goals by club, season and competition
Club	Season	League			Cup (Note: Includes the NWSL Challenge Cup)		Playoffs (Note: Includes NWSL Playoffs)		Total	
Club	Season	Division	Apps	Goals	Apps	Goals	Apps	Goals	Apps	Goals
Chicago Red Stars	2023	NWSL	16	3	3	2	—		19	5
Chicago Red Stars	2024	NWSL	13	4	—		—		13	4
Bay FC	2024	NWSL	7	0	—		1	0	8	0
Bay FC	2025	NWSL	12	5	—		—		12	5
Career total			48	12	3	2	1	0	52	14

== Honors and awards ==
Penn State Nittany Lions

- Big Ten women's soccer tournament: 2022

Kansas City Current

- NWSL Championship: 2026

Individual

- Pac-12 Conference Forward of the Year: 2020, 2021
- Hermann Trophy semifinalist: 2020
