= Rosie Tantillo =

American soccer player

Personal information
- Full name: Rosa Anna Tantillo
- Date of birth: August 6, 1984 (age 42)
- Place of birth: San Diego, California, United States
- Height: 5 ft 6 in (1.68 m)
- Position: Midfielder

Team information
- Current team: FC Gold Pride
- Number: 16

Youth career
- 1994–2002: FC Bratz
- 1999–2003: La Jolla High School
- 2003–2004: Santa Anita Strikers

College career
Years	Team	Apps	(Gls)
2003–2006	USC Trojans		

Senior career*
Years	Team	Apps	(Gls)
2008	Pali Blues	12	(4)
2009	Buffalo Flash		
2010	FC Gold Pride	2	(0)
2011–	San Diego WFC SeaLions		

International career
2004–2007	United States U-21		

Managerial career
- 2007: USC Trojans (assistant)
- * Club domestic league appearances and goals

Rosa Anna Tantillo (born August 6, 1984) is an American soccer player from San Diego, California. She is a midfielder for the San Diego WFC SeaLions and previously played for Women's Professional Soccer club FC Gold Pride.

She served as an undergraduate assistant coach for USC in 2007.
