= Caroline Sjöblom =

Finnish soccer coach (born 1989)

Personal information
- Date of birth: 16 October 1989 (age 37)
- Place of birth: Saltvik, Åland, Finland
- Position: Defender

Senior career*
Years	Team	Apps	(Gls)
2008–2011	Åland United	41	
2011	Djurgårdens IF	22	

Managerial career
- 2016–2018: Tyresö FF
- 2018–2020: AIK
- 2020–2022: Sweden U17
- 2020–2022: Sweden U19
- 2023: Kansas City Current (assistant)
- 2023: Kansas City Current (interim)
- * Club domestic league appearances and goals

Caroline Sjöblom (born 16 October 1989) is the technical director at Chelsea FC women. She was a Finnish women's football manager and former player. As a player, she won the 2009 Naisten Liiga with Åland United. and participated in the 2010–11 UEFA Women's Champions League.

Sjöblom was most recently interim head coach of Kansas City Current in the American top-flight National Women's Soccer League.

== Early life ==
Sjöblom was born in the municipality of Saltvik in the autonomous region of Åland, Finland. She studied behavioural science in university.

== Club career ==
=== Åland United, 2008–2011 ===
Sjöblom joined Åland United in the Naisten Liiga in 2008.

In 2009, she won the Naisten Liiga with Åland United, then participated in the 2010–11 UEFA Women's Champions League, where Åland fell to 1. FFC Turbine Potsdam 15–0 on aggregate in the round of 32.

=== Djugårdens IF, 2011 ===
In 2011, she transferred to Djurgårdens IF in Sweden's Damallsvenskan, where she played centre-back. The club competed for the Svenska Cupen.

Sjöblom retired as a player after the 2011 Damallsvenskan season at the age of 22.

== Coaching career ==
In 2012, Sjöblom joined Stockholm-based AIK as an assistant coach for its academy, then in 2014 for its women's under-19 team.

=== Tyresö FF, 2016–2018 ===
In 2016, she was appointed manager of Tyresö FF competing in Sweden's Division 2. The team won the division, earning promotion to Division 1, and the club appointed Sjöblom sports director in addition to manager.

=== AIK, 2018–2020 ===
On 21 November 2018, AIK appointed Sjöblom as managers of AIK's women's side. In 2020, the club won the Elitettan with a record 72 points, winning 24 of 26 matches, and was promoted to the top-flight Damallsvenskan in 2021.

=== The Swedish FA, 2020–2022 ===
On 1 October 2020, Sjöblom left AIK to accept an appointment from the Swedish Football Association to manage its under-15 and under-17 teams.

In 2021, Sjöblom served as an analyst for the senior team during the 2020 Summer Olympics in Tokyo, Japan.

Sjöblom led the Sweden women's national under-19 football team to qualify for the 2022 UEFA Women's Under-19 Championship, Sweden's first since 2015, where Sweden lost to Spain in the semi-finals and finished third. Her tactics in the tournament were praised by Jarmo Matikainen in UEFA's technical review.

Sjöblom departed the role on 14 December 2022.

=== Kansas City Current, 2023 (interim) ===
On 25 January 2023, American National Women's Soccer League club Kansas City Current announced that it had hired Sjöblom as an assistant coach to head coach Matt Potter on a contract until 2024. In an interview with Aftonbladet, she said the offer was for more resources than any club in Sweden could provide and praised the Current's facilities, staff, and ambitions.

On 19 April 2023, Kansas City fired Potter hours before a match against Houston Dash in the 2023 NWSL Challenge Cup, and Sjöblom was appointed the club's interim manager. Sjöblom learned of Potter's firing and her appointment hours before it occurred and led the Current to a 2–0 victory in her debut as manager, comparing the short turnaround to the limited preparation she had as an international coach.

Sjöblom was not retained as the full-time head coach of the Current for the 2024 season when the franchise hired former United States women's national team and FC Kansas City manager Vlatko Andonovski to lead the team.

== Licensing ==
Sjöblom served as district association captain for the Stockholm Football Association, and completed the UEFA A Licence diploma course for former elite players. In November 2021, Sjöblom graduated from the UEFA Pro Licence program.

== Honours ==
=== Player ===
Åland United

- Naisten Liiga: 2009

=== Manager ===
Tyresö FF

- Sweden's Division 2: 2016

AIK Fotboll Dam

- Elitettan: 2020

Individual

- Åland Sports Awards Silver Ball: 2006
- Åland Sports Awards Manager of the Year nominee: 2022
