= 2022 Kansas City Current season =

Kansas City Current's second season

Kansas City Current
2022 season
- Owners: Angie Long; Chris Long; Brittany Mahomes
- General manager: Camille Levin Ashton
- Head coach: Matt Potter
- Stadium: Children's Mercy Park (capacity: 18,467)
- 2022: 5th
- 2022 NWSL Challenge Cup: Semifinalists; 1st, Central Division
- Playoffs: Finalists
- Top goalscorer: League: Lo'eau LaBonta (7); Cece Kizer (7); All: Kristen Hamilton (12)
- Highest home attendance: 10,395 (Aug. 19 vs. LA)
- Lowest home attendance: 5,695 (June 11 vs. NJ/NY)
- Average home league attendance: 7,657
Home colors	Away colors
- All statistics correct as of October 23, 2022.

The 2022 Kansas City Current season was the team's second season as a professional women's soccer team. The Current plays in the National Women's Soccer League, the top tier of women's soccer in the United States. The team was previously known as Kansas City NWSL.

== Background ==
After finishing in last place during the 2021 season, Kansas City moved head coach Huw Williams into a front-office role. On January 11, 2022, the team hired former United States women's national team assistant coach and U-23 head coach Matt Potter as the team's new head coach for 2022.

== Stadium and facilities ==
In September 2021, the team announced that it was moving from its 2021 season venue, Legends Field baseball park, to Children's Mercy Park in Kansas City, Kansas, sharing it with Sporting Kansas City of Major League Soccer. In October 2021, the team also announced plans to build its own 11,500-capacity venue on the Berkley Riverfront of Kansas City, which was expected to open in 2024.

In June 2022, the Current opened its own dedicated practice facility in Riverside, Missouri. It is the first purpose-built facility for an NWSL team.

== Team ==
=== Technical staff ===
As of July 20, 2022.

General manager	Camille Levin Ashton
Head coach	Matt Potter
Assistant coach	Lucas Rodríguez
Goalkeeper coach	Lloyd Yaxley
High performance director	Ben Donachie
Lead analyst	Donna Newberry

=== Squad ===
As of September 20, 2022.

No.	Pos.	Nation	Player
3	MF	USA	Kristen Edmonds
4	DF	USA	Hailie Mace
5	FW	USA	Cece Kizer
6	FW	USA	Lynn Williams (SEI)
7	DF	USA	Elizabeth Ball
8	DF	USA	Kate Del Fava
10	MF	USA	Lo'eau LaBonta
11	MF	CAN	Desiree Scott (co-captain)
14	MF	USA	Chardonnay Curran
15	MF	USA	Sam Mewis (co-captain; SEI)
16	FW	USA	Jaycie Johnson
18	DF	USA	Izzy Rodriguez
19	DF	USA	Jenna Winebrenner
20	DF	USA	Mallory Weber (SEI)
21	GK	USA	Adrianna Franch
22	DF	USA	Alex Loera
23	FW	USA	Elyse Bennett
24	DF	USA	Taylor Leach
25	FW	USA	Kristen Hamilton
26	DF	USA	Addisyn Merrick
28	MF	USA	Addie McCain
31	GK	JAM	Sydney Schneider
38	GK	USA	Cassie Miller
66	MF	AUS	Chloe Logarzo
94	MF	FRA	Claire Lavogez

== Competitions ==
=== Challenge Cup ===
==== Group stage ====
March 18, 2022 1	Racing Louisville FC	1–1	Kansas City Current	Louisville, Kentucky
EDT	Kizer 20' (McDonald); Bonner (yellow card) 60'	Report	McCain 78' (Williams), (yellow card) 83'	Stadium: Lynn Family Stadium; Attendance: 5,332

March 25, 2022 2	Chicago Red Stars	1–2	Kansas City Current	Bridgeview, Illinois
CDT	DiBernardo 22'; Wright (yellow card) 54'; Cook (yellow card) 90+2'	Report	Mace 58' (LaBonta); Winebrenner (yellow card) 68'; Bennett (yellow card) 77'; Hamilton 86' (Mace)	Stadium: SeatGeek Stadium; Attendance: 2,604

March 30, 2022 3	Houston Dash	0–3	Kansas City Current	Houston, Texas
CDT	Gomera-Stevens (yellow card) 32'; Prisock (yellow card) 56'	Report	Leach 2' (Mace); Hamilton 28' (Bennett); Mace (yellow card) 50'; LaBonta 60' (Bennett)	Stadium: PNC Stadium; Attendance: 2,229

April 2, 2022 4	Kansas City Current	0–3	Racing Louisville FC	Kansas City, Kansas
CDT		Report	Mace 9' (o.g.); DeMelo (yellow card) 50'; Milliet 60'; Bonner 65' (Ekic); Simon (yellow card) 90+6'	Stadium: Children's Mercy Park; Attendance: 6,310

April 15, 2022 5	Kansas City Current	2–1	Houston Dash	Kansas City, Kansas
CDT	Hamilton 4' (Rodriguez); Ball (yellow card) 36'; Pickett 80'	Report	Groom 59' (Sánchez); Hedge (yellow card) 75'; Abam (yellow card) 79'	Stadium: Children's Mercy Park; Attendance: 5,022

April 24, 2022 6	Kansas City Current	2–1	Chicago Red Stars	Kansas City, Kansas
14:00 CDT	Loera 50' (Bennett); Edmonds (yellow card) 74'; Hamilton 76' (Bennett)	Report	Wright (yellow card) 45+2'; St-Georges 52' (Stevens)	Stadium: Children's Mercy Park; Attendance: 5,107; Referee: Adorae Monroy

==== Central Division standings ====
Pos	Team	Pld	W	T	L	GF	GA	GD	Pts	Qualification	KC	CHI	LOU	HOU
1	Kansas City Current	6	4	1	1	10	7	+3	13	Advance to knockout stage	—	2–1	0–3	2–1
2	Chicago Red Stars	6	2	2	2	8	6	+2	8		1–2	—	0–0	2–0
3	Racing Louisville FC	6	1	3	2	8	7	+1	6		1–1	1–1	—	2–3
4	Houston Dash	6	2	0	4	7	13	−6	6		0–3	1–3	2–1	—

Source: NWSL
Rules for classification: 1) Total points; 2) Total goal differential; 3) Total number of goals scored; 4) Head-to-head points record; 5) Head-to-head goal differential; 6) Head-to-head number of goals scored; 7) Fewest disciplinary points; 8) Drawing of lots

==== Knockout stage ====
May 4, 2022 Semifinal	Kansas City Current	1–2	North Carolina Courage	Kansas City, Kansas
19:30 CDT	Winebrenner (yellow card) 18'; Hamilton (yellow card) 68', (goal) 79' (McCain)	Report	Debinha 19' (pen.); Ordoñez 36', (yellow card) 59'; Gray (yellow card) 55'; Mathias (yellow card) 90+2'	Stadium: Children's Mercy Park; Attendance: 4,093; Referee: Natalie Simon

=== Regular season ===
==== Matches ====
April 30, 2022 1	Portland Thorns FC	3–0	Kansas City Current	Portland, Oregon
PDT	Weaver 8'; Sinclair 34'; Smith 51' (Klingenberg)	Report		Stadium: Providence Park; Attendance: 13,672

May 8, 2022 2	Kansas City Current	0–2	Houston Dash	Kansas City, Kansas
CDT	Scott (yellow card) 64'; Loera (yellow card) 90+2'	Report	Daly 40'; Sánchez (yellow card) 75'; Visalli 90+6' (Daly)	Stadium: Children's Mercy Park; Attendance: 6,140

May 14, 2022 3	Orlando Pride	2–2	Kansas City Current	Orlando, Florida
EDT	Pruitt (yellow card) 45+2'; Jónsdóttir 51' (Leroux); Strom (yellow card) 56'; Cluff (yellow card) 74'	Report	Loera (yellow card) 32'; Bennett 78' (LaBonta); Hamilton 90+1' (Bennett); Scott (yellow card) 90+4'; Ball (yellow card) 90+7'	Stadium: Exploria Stadium; Attendance: 3,511

May 21, 2022 4	Angel City FC	1–0	Kansas City Current	Los Angeles, California
PDT	McCaskill (yellow card) 11'; Charley (yellow card) 30'; Leach 70' (o.g.)	Report	Pickett (yellow card) 64'; Ball (yellow card) 90+1'	Stadium: Banc of California Stadium; Attendance: 18,514

May 25, 2022 5	OL Reign	1–0	Kansas City Current	Seattle, Washington
PDT	McClernon (yellow card) 6'; Angelina (yellow card) 62'; Balcer 80' (Huerta)	Report	Nolf (yellow card) 28'	Stadium: Lumen Field; Attendance: 3,944

May 30, 2022 6	Kansas City Current	1–0	Racing Louisville FC	Kansas City, Kansas
CDT	LaBonta 3' (pen.)	Report		Stadium: Children's Mercy Park; Attendance: 6,484

June 4, 2022 7	Kansas City Current	2–2	San Diego Wave FC	Kansas City, Kansas
CDT	Hamilton 11' (LaBonta); Bennett 63' (Loera)	Report	Morgan 37' (pen.), 90' (Jakobsson); Kornieck (yellow card) 45+3'	Stadium: Children's Mercy Park; Attendance: 7,954

June 11, 2022 8	Kansas City Current	1–0	NJ/NY Gotham FC	Kansas City, Kansas
CDT	Hamilton 84' (Rodriguez)	Report	Torres (yellow card) 53'	Stadium: Children's Mercy Park; Attendance: 5,695

June 18, 2022 9	Kansas City Current	2–2	Chicago Red Stars	Kansas City, Kansas
CDT	Hamilton 8' (Mace); Kizer 68' (Bennett)	Report	DiBernardo (yellow card) 3'; Kowalski 53' (Pugh); Pugh 58' (pen.); Colaprico (yellow card) 88'	Stadium: Children's Mercy Park; Attendance: 6,848

July 1, 2022 10	Houston Dash	1–2	Kansas City Current	Houston, Texas
CDT	Groom (yellow card) 42'; Eddy (yellow card) 54'; Hanson (yellow card) 71'; Salmon (yellow card) 90+2'; Prisock (yellow card) 90+7'; Ball 90+10' (o.g.)	Report	LaBonta 43' (pen.); Mace 46' (Kizer)	Stadium: PNC Stadium; Attendance: 5,007

July 10, 2022 11	Washington Spirit	0–1	Kansas City Current	Leesburg, Virginia
EDT		Report	Bennett (yellow card) 59'; Kizer 68'	Stadium: Segra Field; Attendance: 2,932

July 17, 2022 12	Kansas City Current	1–0	OL Reign	Kansas City, Kansas
CDT	LaBonta 18' (pen.); Loera (yellow card) 90'	Report	Hiatt (yellow card) 74'	Stadium: Children's Mercy Park; Attendance: 7,246; Referee: Alex Billeter

July 31, 2022 13	Kansas City Current	2–2	Orlando Pride	Kansas City, Kansas
18:00 CDT	Bennett 57' (Mace); Mace (yellow card) 64'; Scott (yellow card) 68'; Kizer 82' (LaBonta); Pickett (yellow card) 83'	Report	Celia 25' (Tymrak); Dougherty Howard (yellow card) 38'; Listro (yellow card) 39'; Doyle 46' (Dougherty Howard)	Stadium: Children's Mercy Park; Attendance: 7,192; Referee: Greg Dopka

August 7, 2022 14	San Diego Wave FC	1–2	Kansas City Current	San Diego, California
14:00 PDT	Sheridan (yellow card) 67'; Ali 88' (Doniak)	Report	Pickett (yellow card) 26'; Kizer 27' (Hamilton); Ball (yellow card) 33'; Mace 39'	Stadium: Torero Stadium; Attendance: 4,471; Referee: Samantha Martinez

August 13, 2022 15	North Carolina Courage	3–4	Kansas City Current	Cary, North Carolina
18:00 EDT	Ordoñez 17' (Debinha); Debinha 36' (Kerolin); Kurtz 56' (Pinto); Daniels (yellow card) 90+1'	Report	Hamilton 20' (LaBonta); LaBonta 45'; Kizer 60' (Lavogez); Lavogez 79' (Ball)	Stadium: WakeMed Soccer Park; Attendance: 5,092; Referee: Anya Voigt

August 19, 2022 16	Kansas City Current	1–1	Angel City FC	Kansas City, Kansas
19:00 CDT	Del Fava (yellow card) 62'; LaBonta 82' (pen.)	Report	Roccaro (yellow card) 28', (goal) 78' (Ali Riley); Lussi (yellow card) 76'; Nielsen (yellow card) 81'; Weatherholt (yellow card) 88'	Stadium: Children's Mercy Park; Attendance: 10,395; Referee: Ricardo Fierro

August 28, 2022 17	Kansas City Current	3–2	North Carolina Courage	Kansas City, Kansas
18:00 CDT	LaBonta 5' (pen.); Kizer 56' (Loera); Hamilton 59' (Del Fava); Ball (yellow card) 87'	Report	Kerolin 28' (Mathias), 48' (Kurtz); Speck (yellow card) 65'	Stadium: Children's Mercy Park; Attendance: 7,395; Referee: Malik Badawi

September 11, 2022 18	NJ/NY Gotham FC	0–1	Kansas City Current	Harrison, New Jersey
20:00 EDT		Report	Merrick (yellow card) 2'; Mace 78' (pen.)	Stadium: Red Bull Arena; Attendance: 2,130

September 14, 2022 19	Chicago Red Stars	4–0	Kansas City Current	Bridgeview, Illinois
19:00 CDT	Milazzo 5'; Pugh 8' (Morse), 60', (yellow card) 26'; DiBernardo (yellow card) 47'; Kowalski 72' (Pugh), (yellow card) 75'	Report	Leach (yellow card) 42'; Ball (yellow card) 90'	Stadium: SeatGeek Stadium; Attendance: 2,135; Referee: Katja Koroleva

September 18, 2022 20	Kansas City Current	1–1	Portland Thorns FC	Kansas City, Kansas
16:00 CDT	Bennett (yellow card) 73'; Mace 90+4' (Edmonds)	Report	Rodriguez 84'; Sauerbrunn (yellow card) 90+3'	Stadium: Children's Mercy Park; Attendance: 9,281

September 25, 2022 21	Kansas City Current	3–0	Washington Spirit	Kansas City, Kansas
16:00 CDT	LaBonta 18' (Del Fava); Kizer 38' (Loera); Lavogez 41' (Hamilton)	Report	Roddar (yellow card) 8'; Staab (yellow card) 27'	Stadium: Children's Mercy Park; Attendance: 9,593; Referee: Alyssa Nichols; Assistant referees: Tiffini Turpin, Seth Barton; Fourth official: Laura Rodriguez

October 1, 2022 22	Racing Louisville FC	1–0	Kansas City Current	Louisville, Kentucky
18:30 CDT	Ekic (yellow card) 72'; McDonald 90+2'	Report	Scott (yellow card) 74' (yellow-red card) 78'; Del Fava (yellow card) 90+1'	Stadium: Lynn Family Stadium; Attendance: 6,622; Referee: Karen Callado

==== Regular season standings ====
Pos	Team	Pld	W	D	L	GF	GA	GD	Pts	Qualification
1	OL Reign	22	11	7	4	32	19	+13	40	NWSL Shield, Playoffs – semi-finals
2	Portland Thorns FC (C)	22	10	9	3	49	24	+25	39	Playoffs – semi-finals
3	San Diego Wave FC	22	10	6	6	32	21	+11	36	Playoffs – first round
4	Houston Dash	22	10	6	6	35	27	+8	36	Playoffs – first round
5	Kansas City Current	22	10	6	6	29	29	0	36	Playoffs – first round
6	Chicago Red Stars	22	9	6	7	34	28	+6	33	Playoffs – first round
7	North Carolina Courage	22	9	5	8	46	33	+13	32	
8	Angel City FC	22	8	5	9	23	27	−4	29	
9	Racing Louisville FC	22	5	8	9	23	35	−12	23	
10	Orlando Pride	22	5	7	10	22	45	−23	22	
11	Washington Spirit	22	3	10	9	26	33	−7	19	
12	NJ/NY Gotham FC	22	4	1	17	16	46	−30	13	

Source: NWSL
Rules for classification: Tiebreakers
(C) Champions

==== Results summary ====
Overall								Home						Away					
Pld	W	D	L	GF	GA	GD	Pts	W	D	L	GF	GA	GD	W	D	L	GF	GA	GD
22	10	6	6	29	29	0	36	5	5	1	17	12	+5	5	1	5	12	17	−5

Last updated: October 1, 2022.
Source: NWSLsoccer.com

==== Results by matchday ====
Matchday	1	2	3	4	5	6	7	8	9	10	11	12	13	14	15	16	17	18	19	20	21	22
Stadium	A	H	A	A	A	H	H	H	H	A	A	H	H	A	A	H	H	A	A	H	H	A
Result	L	L	D	L	L	W	D	W	D	W	W	W	D	W	W	D	W	W	L	D	W	L
Position	12	12	11	11	11	11	11	10	10	7	7	5	6	5	4	3	3	1	1	3	3	5

Updated to match(es) played on October 1, 2022. Source: NWSL
A = Away; H = Home; W = Win; D = Draw; L = Loss

=== NWSL Playoffs ===
The top six teams from the regular season qualified for the NWSL Championship playoffs, with the top two teams receiving a first-round bye.

October 16, 2022 1st Round	Houston Dash	1–2	Kansas City Current	Houston, Texas
16:00 CDT	Schmidt 21'; Prisock (yellow card) 26'; Eddy (yellow card) 88'; Alozie (yellow card) 89'; Sánchez (yellow card) 90+1'	Report	LaBonta 5' (pen.); Lavogez (yellow card) 10'; Mace (yellow card) 90+6'; Del Fava 90+10'	Stadium: PNC Stadium; Attendance: 21,284; Referee: Elijio Arreguin

October 23, 2022 Semi-finals	OL Reign	0–2	Kansas City Current	Seattle, Washington
16:30 PDT		Report	Loera 4'; Hamilton 63'	Stadium: Lumen Field; Attendance: 21,491; Referee: Alex Billeter; Assistant referees: Tiffini Turpin, Jeremy Smith; Fourth official: Brad Jensen

October 29, 2022 Finals	Portland Thorns FC	2–0	Kansas City Current	Washington, D.C.
20:00 EDT	Smith 4'; Merrick 56' (o.g.)	Report		Stadium: Audi Field; Attendance: 17,624; Referee: Natalie Simon

== Awards ==
=== NWSL weekly awards ===
==== Player of the Week ====
Competition	Week	Nat.	Player	Won	Ref.
Challenge Cup	5	(United States)	Elyse Bennett	Won	
Regular season	3	(United States)	Elyse Bennett	Nom.	
Regular season	10	(United States)	Adrianna Franch	Won	
Regular season	14	(France)	Claire Lavogez	Won	

==== Save of the Week ====
Competition	Week	Nat.	Player	Won	Ref.
Challenge Cup	5	(United States)	Kristen Edmonds	Won	
Regular season	1	(United States)	Adrianna Franch	Nom.	
Regular season	2	(United States)	Adrianna Franch	Nom.	
Regular season	3	(United States)	Adrianna Franch	Nom.	
Regular season	5	(United States)	Adrianna Franch	Nom.	
Regular season	6	(United States)	Adrianna Franch	Nom.	
Regular season	9	(United States)	Adrianna Franch	Nom.	
Regular season	10	(United States)	Adrianna Franch	Won	
Regular season	11	(United States)	Adrianna Franch	Won	
Regular season	12	(United States)	Adrianna Franch	Nom.	

== Transactions ==
=== 2022 NWSL Expansion Draft ===
The 2022 NWSL Expansion Draft was an expansion draft held by the NWSL on December 16, 2021, for two expansion teams, Angel City FC and San Diego Wave FC, to select players from existing teams in the league. Kansas City Current were exempt from the draft.

=== 2022 NWSL Draft ===
Draft picks are not automatically signed to the team roster. The 2022 NWSL Draft was held on December 18, 2021. The NWSL awarded Kansas City all of the defunct Utah Royals FC team's player rights and draft picks upon its dissolution in 2020.

Round	Pick	Nat.	Player	Pos.	College	Status	Ref.
1	7	(United States)	Elyse Bennett	FW	Washington State	Signed to two-year contract	
2	17	(United States)	Chardonnay Curran	MF	Oregon	Signed to two-year contract	
4	41	(United States)	Jenna Winebrenner	DF	Notre Dame	Signed to one-year contract with one-year option	
4	43	(United States)	Izzy Rodriguez	DF	Ohio State	Signed to one-year contract with one-year option	

=== Transfers in ===
Date	Nat.	Player	Pos.	Previous club	Fee/notes	Ref.
November 30, 2021	(United States)	Sam Mewis	MF	(United States) North Carolina Courage	Acquired in exchange for the third-overall pick in the 2023 NWSL Draft and Kiki Pickett.	
January 10, 2022	(United States)	Lynn Williams	FW	(United States) North Carolina Courage	Acquired with North Carolina's natural second- and fourth-round picks in the 2023 NWSL Draft, in exchange for $200,000 in allocation money, Kansas City's natural first-round pick in the 2023 NWSL Draft, and Katelyn Rowland.	
February 18, 2022	(United States)	Cassie Miller	GK	(United States) Chicago Red Stars	Acquired in exchange for $75,000 in allocation money.	
March 23, 2022	(Jamaica)	Sydney Schneider	GK	(United States) Washington Spirit	Signed off waivers to a one-year contract with one-year option.	
June 9, 2022	(United States)	Cece Kizer	FW	(United States) Racing Louisville FC	Acquired in exchange for an international spot in 2022 and 2023 and $150,000 in allocation money, as well as a conditional $25,000 of allocation money based on Kizer's performance.	
June 9, 2022	(United States)	Addisyn Merrick	DF	(United States) Racing Louisville FC	Acquired in exchange for an international spot in 2022 and 2023 and $150,000 in allocation money, as well as a conditional $25,000 of allocation money based on Kizer's performance.	
July 20, 2022	(France)	Claire Lavogez	FW	(France) FC Girondins de Bordeaux	Signed to one-year contract with one-year option.	

=== Transfers out ===
Date	Nat.	Player	Pos.	Destination club	Fee/notes	Ref.
November 30, 2021	(United States)	Kiki Pickett	DF	(United States) North Carolina Courage	Traded with the third-overall pick in the 2023 NWSL Draft for Sam Mewis.	
January 10, 2022	(United States)	Katelyn Rowland	GK	(United States) North Carolina Courage	Traded with $200,000 in allocation money and Kansas City's natural first-round pick in the 2023 NWSL Draft, in exchange for North Carolina's natural second- and fourth-round picks in the 2023 NWSL Draft and Lynn Williams.	
July 19, 2022	(United States)	Carly Nelson	GK	(Denmark) FC Nordsjælland	Permanently acquired during loan.	
August 22, 2022	(Canada)	Victoria Pickett	MF	(United States) NJ/NY Gotham FC	Traded in exchange for $200,000 in allocation money and a conditional first-round draft pick in the 2023 NWSL Draft.	
September 20, 2022	(United States)	Maddie Nolf	DF	(Scotland) Rangers W.F.C.	Transferred for an undisclosed fee.	
