= 2022 NWSL Challenge Cup =

Third edition of top women's soccer league cup in the United States

2022 National Women's Soccer League Challenge Cup

Tournament details
- Country: United States
- Dates: March 18–May 7
- Teams: 12

Final positions
- Champions: North Carolina Courage (1st title)
- Runners-up: Washington Spirit

Tournament statistics
- Matches played: 39
- Goals scored: 106 (2.72 per match)
- Top goal scorer: Ashley Hatch (6 goals)

Awards
- MVP: Debinha

The 2022 NWSL Challenge Cup was a league cup competition that took place during the 2022 National Women's Soccer League season. It was the third iteration of the NWSL Challenge Cup tournament. In the 2022 championship game, the North Carolina Courage won their first title, defeating the Washington Spirit 2–1.

== Format ==
The 2022 NWSL Challenge Cup was a multi-stage tournament. All 12 NWSL teams participated in the Challenge Cup, an increase of two from the previous edition due to the addition of expansion franchises Angel City FC and San Diego Wave FC during the offseason. As a result, the competition was split into three regional groups of four teams each; East, Central and West. Each team played a six-game double round-robin in which every team played all others in its division at home and away. The winner from each of the three divisions along with the highest-ranked group stage runner-up progressed to the knockout stage, which consisted of three single-elimination matches: two semifinals and one final. As a result of the expanded group stage, teams played a minimum of six games, two more than in 2021, and a maximum of eight, three more than in 2021. A total of 39 matches were played, 18 more than the 21 matches played during the 2021 NWSL Challenge Cup.

No matches had extra time. In the group stage, matches could end in a tie at the end of normal playing time. In the knockout stage, if a match was tied at the end of normal playing time, the game was decided by a penalty shoot-out.

Teams were required to have a minimum of 18 players and a maximum of 20 players on a matchday roster. A maximum of nine players could be named as substitutes with a maximum of five substitutions in three stoppages (excluding half-time) permitted to be used during a match. No substitutes could be made after the end of normal playing time (except if a goalkeeper was unable to continue before or during the penalty shoot-out). Two "concussion substitutes" could also be used in accordance with IFAB rules.

=== Tiebreakers ===
A team's position in the divisional standings was determined by points, with three points awarded for a win, one point for a tie, and zero points for a loss. If two or more teams in the same group were tied on points at the end of the group stage, the following tiebreaking criteria were applied to determine the final group standings:

1. Greatest goal difference across all group stage matches.
2. Most goals scored across all group stage matches.
3. Direct head-to-head points record with teams involved in the tie.
4. Direct head-to-head goal difference in matches between teams involved in the tie.
5. Direct head-to-head number of goals scored in matches between teams involved in the tie.
6. Fewest disciplinary points accrued. Points were awarded as follows (players could receive only one disciplinary points assessment per match, with the highest taking precedent):
  1. yellow card: 1 point;
  2. (yellow card) (yellow-red card) indirect red card (as a result of two yellow cards): 3 points;
  3. (red card) direct red card: 4 points;
  4. (yellow card) (red card) yellow card and direct red card: 5 points.
7. If teams still could not be separated using the tiebreaking procedures, the NWSL would decide ranking using the random drawing of lots.

In the case of two or more teams from different divisions being tied on points at the end of the group stage, the same procedure was followed except for the use of the head-to-head scenarios by virtue of the fact teams from different divisions would not have played each other during the group stage.

== Group stage ==
=== East Division ===
==== Standings ====
Pos	Team	Pld	W	T	L	GF	GA	GD	Pts	Qualification	NC	WAS	NJY	ORL
1	North Carolina Courage	6	3	3	0	12	7	+5	12	Advance to knockout stage	—	2–2	2–0	1–0
2	Washington Spirit	6	2	4	0	12	7	+5	10	Advance to knockout stage based on ranking	2–2	—	1–1	4–1
3	NJ/NY Gotham FC	6	1	3	2	5	8	−3	6		1–1	1–3	—	1–1
4	Orlando Pride	6	0	2	4	4	11	−7	2		2–4	0–0	0–1	—

Source: NWSL
Rules for classification: 1) Total points; 2) Total goal differential; 3) Total number of goals scored; 4) Head-to-head points record; 5) Head-to-head goal differential; 6) Head-to-head number of goals scored; 7) Fewest disciplinary points; 8) Drawing of lots

==== Matches ====
March 19
19:00 ET

Orlando Pride	0–0	Washington Spirit
	Report

Exploria Stadium, Orlando, Florida
Attendance: 3,534
Referee: Laura Rodriguez

March 19
19:00 ET

North Carolina Courage	2–0	NJ/NY Gotham FC
Pinto 22'; Erceg 51'	Report

WakeMed Soccer Park, Cary, North Carolina
Attendance: 2,537
Referee: Karen Callado

March 25
19:30 ET

Washington Spirit	1–1	NJ/NY Gotham FC
Hatch 61'	Report	Mewis 23' (pen.)

Segra Field, Leesburg, Virginia
Attendance: 3,421
Referee: Alyssa Nichols

March 26
19:00 ET

North Carolina Courage	1–0	Orlando Pride
Mathias 61' (pen.)	Report

WakeMed Soccer Park, Cary, North Carolina
Attendance: 3,328
Referee: Joshua Encarnación

March 30
19:00 ET

Orlando Pride	0–1	NJ/NY Gotham FC
	Report	Purce 83'

Exploria Stadium, Orlando, Florida
Attendance: 3,351
Referee: Anya Voigt

March 30
19:30 ET

Washington Spirit	2–2	North Carolina Courage
Rodman 58'; Hatch 67'	Report	Debinha 5'; Smith 26'

Audi Field, Washington, D.C.
Attendance: 2,155
Referee: Danielle Chesky

April 3
15:00 ET

NJ/NY Gotham FC	1–1	North Carolina Courage
Onumonu 84'	Report	Debinha 25'

Red Bull Arena, Harrison, New Jersey
Referee: Laura Rodriguez

April 3
16:00 ET

Washington Spirit	4–1	Orlando Pride
Sanchez 43'; Sullivan 45'; Hatch 49'; Rodman 87'	Report	Jonsdottir 54'

Audi Field, Washington, D.C.
Attendance: 5,656
Referee: Sergii Demianchuk

April 16
19:00 ET

Orlando Pride	2–4	North Carolina Courage
Jenkins 15', 56'	Report	Montefusco 3' (o.g.); Daniels 6'; Smith 9'; Debinha 89'

Exploria Stadium, Orlando, Florida
Attendance: 3,601
Referee: Alyssa Nichols

April 17
15:00 ET

NJ/NY Gotham FC	1–3	Washington Spirit
Kawasumi 4'	Report	Sanchez 24'; Rodman 39', 75'

Red Bull Arena, Harrison, New Jersey
Attendance: 2,061
Referee: Elvis Osmanovic

April 23
13:00 ET

North Carolina Courage	2–2	Washington Spirit
Debinha 45+4' (pen.); Berkely 52'	Report	Hatch 15', 75' (pen.)

WakeMed Soccer Park, Cary, North Carolina
Attendance: 3,905
Referee: Eric Tattersall

April 23
19:00 ET

NJ/NY Gotham FC	1–1	Orlando Pride
Mewis 45+1' (pen.)	Report	Jónsdóttir 10'

Red Bull Arena, Harrison, New Jersey
Attendance: 2,734
Referee: Jeremy Scheer

=== Central Division ===
==== Standings ====
Pos	Team	Pld	W	T	L	GF	GA	GD	Pts	Qualification	KC	CHI	LOU	HOU
1	Kansas City Current	6	4	1	1	10	7	+3	13	Advance to knockout stage	—	2–1	0–3	2–1
2	Chicago Red Stars	6	2	2	2	8	6	+2	8		1–2	—	0–0	2–0
3	Racing Louisville FC	6	1	3	2	8	7	+1	6		1–1	1–1	—	2–3
4	Houston Dash	6	2	0	4	7	13	−6	6		0–3	1–3	2–1	—

Source: NWSL
Rules for classification: 1) Total points; 2) Total goal differential; 3) Total number of goals scored; 4) Head-to-head points record; 5) Head-to-head goal differential; 6) Head-to-head number of goals scored; 7) Fewest disciplinary points; 8) Drawing of lots

==== Matches ====
March 18
19:30 ET

Racing Louisville FC	1–1	Kansas City Current
Kizer 20'	Report	McCain 78'

Lynn Family Stadium, Louisville, Kentucky
Attendance: 5,532
Referee: Danielle Cheskey

March 20
19:00 ET

Houston Dash	1–3	Chicago Red Stars
Naughton 19'	Report	Pugh 27', 60'; Wright 58' (pen.)

PNC Stadium, Houston, Texas
Attendance: 4,087
Referee: Joshua Encarnación

March 25
19:30 ET

Racing Louisville FC	2–3	Houston Dash
Davis 16'; McDonald 40'	Report	Viggiano 58'; Sánchez 56'; Daly 65' (pen.)

Lynn Family Stadium, Louisville, Kentucky
Attendance: 3,800
Referee: Sergii Demianchuk

March 25
20:30 ET

Chicago Red Stars	1–2	Kansas City Current
DiBernardo 22'	Report	Mace 58'; Hamilton 86'

SeatGeek Stadium, Bridgeview, Illinois
Attendance: 2,604
Referee: Greg Dopka

March 30
19:30 ET

Chicago Red Stars	0–0	Racing Louisville FC
	Report

SeatGeek Stadium, Bridgeview, Illinois
Referee: Calin Radosav

March 30
20:30 ET

Houston Dash	0–3	Kansas City Current
	Report	Leach 2'; Hamilton 28'; LaBonta 60'

PNC Stadium, Houston, Texas
Attendance: 2,229
Referee: Laura Rodriguez

April 2
15:00 ET

Kansas City Current	0–3	Racing Louisville FC
	Report	Mace 9' (o.g.); Milliet 60'; Bonner 65'

Children's Mercy Park, Kansas City, Kansas
Attendance: 6,310
Referee: Alyssa Nichols

April 2
20:00 ET

Chicago Red Stars	2–0	Houston Dash
Pugh 32', 82'	Report

SeatGeek Stadium, Bridgeview, Illinois
Attendance: 1,741
Referee: Katja Koroleva

April 15
20:00 ET

Kansas City Current	2–1	Houston Dash
Hamilton 4'; Pickett 80'	Report	Groom 59'

Children's Mercy Park, Kansas City, Kansas
Attendance: 5,022
Referee: Jeremy Scheer

April 16
19:30 ET

Racing Louisville FC	1–1	Chicago Red Stars
Ekic 76'	Report	Kowalski 7'

Lynn Family Stadium, Louisville, Kentucky
Attendance: 4,409
Referee: Laura Rodriguez

April 24
17:00 ET

Kansas City Current	2–1	Chicago Red Stars
Loera 50'; Hamilton 76'	Report	St. Georges 52'

Children's Mercy Park, Kansas City, Kansas
Attendance: 5,107
Referee: Adorae Monroy

April 24
19:00 ET

Houston Dash	2–1	Racing Louisville FC
Prince 24'; Prisock 35'	Report	Howell 29'

PNC Stadium, Houston, Texas
Attendance: 3,073
Referee: Brad Jensen

=== West Division ===
==== Standings ====
Pos	Team	Pld	W	T	L	GF	GA	GD	Pts	Qualification	RGN	POR	SD	LA
1	OL Reign	6	4	2	0	11	5	+6	14	Advance to knockout stage	—	1–1	3–1	2–1
2	Portland Thorns FC	6	3	1	2	8	5	+3	10		0–1	—	3–2	3–0
3	San Diego Wave FC	6	1	2	3	9	11	−2	5		1–1	0–1	—	4–2
4	Angel City FC	6	1	1	4	6	13	−7	4		1–3	1–0	1–1	—

Source: NWSL
Rules for classification: 1) Total points; 2) Total goal differential; 3) Total number of goals scored; 4) Head-to-head points record; 5) Head-to-head goal differential; 6) Head-to-head number of goals scored; 7) Fewest disciplinary points; 8) Drawing of lots

==== Matches ====
March 18
22:00 ET

OL Reign	1–1	Portland Thorns FC
Huerta 18'	Report	Sinclair 28'

Lumen Field, Seattle, Washington
Attendance: 7,343
Referee: Kevin Broadley

March 19
21:00 ET

Angel City FC	1–1	San Diego Wave FC
McCaskill 49'	Report	Riehl 82'

Titan Stadium, Fullerton, California
Attendance: 6,307
Referee: Elvis Osmanovic

March 26
16:00 ET

Angel City FC	1–3	OL Reign
Lussi 67'	Report	Latsko 12'; Cook 18'; Angelina 50'

Titan Stadium, Fullerton, California
Attendance: 4,156
Referee: Katja Koroleva

March 26
22:00 ET

San Diego Wave FC	0–1	Portland Thorns FC
	Report	S. Smith 5'

Torero Stadium, San Diego, California
Attendance: 6,000
Referee: Luis Guardia

March 30
22:00 ET

Portland Thorns FC	3–0	Angel City FC
S. Smith 31'; Ryan 53'; Weaver 78'	Report

Providence Park, Portland, Oregon
Attendance: 9,902
Referee: Mark Allatin

April 2
16:00 ET

San Diego Wave FC	4–2	Angel City FC
Taylor 19'; Morgan 45+3', 72'; Ali 81'	Report	McGrady 38' (o.g.); Press 59'

Torero Stadium, San Diego, California
Attendance: 5,158
Referee: Brad Jensen

April 2
22:00 ET

Portland Thorns FC	0–1	OL Reign
	Report	Lavelle 74'

Providence Park, Portland, Oregon
Attendance: 12,034
Referee: Elijio Arreguin

April 14
22:00 ET

OL Reign	3–1	San Diego Wave FC
Stanton 2'; Balcer 8'; Hiatt 11'	Report	Morgan 24'

Lumen Field, Seattle, Washington
Attendance: 4,803
Referee: Adorae Monroy

April 17
18:00 ET

OL Reign	2–1	Angel City FC
Balcer 34'; Van der Jagt 90+4'	Report	Charley 83'

Lumen Field, Seattle, Washington
Attendance: 5,660
Referee: Brandon Stevis

April 17
19:00 ET

Portland Thorns FC	3–2	San Diego Wave FC
S. Smith 4'; Sugita 21', 41'	Report	Briede 46'; Kornieck 67'

Providence Park, Portland, Oregon
Attendance: 12,440
Referee: Ricardo Fierro

April 23
22:00 ET

San Diego Wave FC	1–1	OL Reign
Morgan 45+1' (pen.)	Report	Watt 13'

Torero Stadium, San Diego, California
Attendance: 6,000
Referee: Samantha Martinez

April 24
21:00 ET

Angel City FC	1–0	Portland Thorns FC
Press 29' (pen.)	Report

Titan Stadium, Fullerton, California
Referee: JC Griggs

=== Ranking of second-placed teams ===
The best second-placed team from the group stage advanced to the knockout stage.

Pos	Grp	Team	Pld	W	T	L	GF	GA	GD	Pts	Qualification
1	East	Washington Spirit	6	2	4	0	12	7	+5	10	Advance to knockout stage
2	West	Portland Thorns FC	6	3	1	2	8	5	+3	10	
3	Central	Chicago Red Stars	6	2	2	2	8	6	+2	8	

Source: NWSL
Rules for classification: 1) Total points; 2) Total goal differential; 3) Total number of goals scored; 4) Fewest disciplinary points; 4) Drawing of lots

== Knockout stage ==
The seeding of the division winners was determined by points accumulated in the group stage, followed if necessary by any applicable tiebreakers. The advancing second-place team was automatically made the #4 seed.

=== Bracket ===
Semifinals
1	OL Reign	0 (8)
4	Washington Spirit (p)	0 (9)
2	Kansas City Current	1
3	North Carolina Courage	2

Championship
4	Washington Spirit	1
3	North Carolina Courage	2

=== Semifinals ===
May 4
20:00 ET

OL Reign	0–0	Washington Spirit
	Report
Penalties
Lavelle (penalty scored); Cook (penalty scored); Miramontez (penalty scored); Rapinoe (penalty scored); Balcer (penalty scored); Huerta (penalty scored); Watt (penalty scored); Stanton (penalty missed); Hiatt (penalty scored); Fishlock (penalty missed)	8–9	(penalty scored) Hatch; (penalty scored) Sonnett; (penalty scored) Kingsbury; (penalty scored) Sanchez; (penalty scored) Rodman; (penalty scored) Bailey; (penalty scored) Roddar; (penalty missed) Alexander; (penalty scored) Heilferty; (penalty scored) Staab

Audi Field, Washington, D.C.
Attendance: 3,015
Referee: Greg Dopka

May 4
20:30 ET

Kansas City Current	1–2	North Carolina Courage
Hamilton 79'	Report	Debinha 19' (pen.); Ordoñez 36'

Children's Mercy Park, Kansas City, Kansas
Attendance: 4,093
Referee: Natalie Simon

=== Championship ===
May 7
13:00 ET

North Carolina Courage	2–1	Washington Spirit
Kerolin 10'; Aylmer 70' (o.g.)	Report	Hatch 35'

WakeMed Soccer Park, Cary, North Carolina
Attendance: 3,163
Referee: Katja Koroleva

== Statistics ==
=== Goalscorers ===
There were 106 goals scored in 39 matches, for an average of 2.72 goals per match.

6 goals

- (United States) Ashley Hatch, WAS

5 goals

- (Brazil) Debinha, NC
- (United States) Kristen Hamilton, KC

4 goals

- (United States) Mallory Pugh, CHI
- (United States) Alex Morgan, SD
- (United States) Trinity Rodman, WAS

3 goals

- (United States) Sophia Smith, POR

2 goals

- (United States) Christen Press, LA
- (United States) Taylor Smith, NC
- (United States) Kristie Mewis, NJY
- (United States) Darian Jenkins, ORL
- (Iceland) Gunny Jonsdottir, ORL
- (Japan) Hina Sugita, POR
- (United States) Bethany Balcer, RGN
- (United States) Ashley Sanchez, WAS

1 goal

- (United States) Vanessa DiBernardo, CHI
- (United States) Amanda Kowalski, CHI
- (Canada) Bianca St-Georges, CHI
- (United States) Arin Wright, CHI
- (England) Rachel Daly, HOU
- (United States) Shea Groom, HOU
- (United States) Katie Naughton, HOU
- (Canada) Nichelle Prince, HOU
- (United States) Ally Prisock, HOU
- (Mexico) María Sánchez, HOU
- (United States) Marisa Viggiano, HOU
- (United States) Lo'eau LaBonta, KC
- (United States) Taylor Leach, KC
- (United States) Alex Loera, KC
- (United States) Hailie Mace, KC
- (United States) Addie McCain, KC
- (Canada) Victoria Pickett, KC
- (United States) Simone Charley, LA
- (United States) Tyler Lussi, LA
- (United States) Savannah McCaskill, LA
- (England) Gemma Bonner, LOU
- (United States) Kirsten Davis, LOU
- (United States) Emina Ekic, LOU
- (United States) Jaelin Howell, LOU
- (United States) Cece Kizer, LOU
- (United States) Jessica McDonald, LOU
- (United States) Lauren Milliet, LOU
- (United States) Malia Berkely, NC
- (United States) Jaelene Daniels, NC
- (New Zealand) Abby Erceg, NC
- (Brazil) Kerolin, NC
- (United States) Merritt Mathias, NC
- (Mexico) Diana Ordoñez, NC
- (United States) Brianna Pinto, NC
- (Japan) Nahomi Kawasumi, NJY
- (Nigeria) Ifeoma Onumonu, NJY
- (United States) Midge Purce, NJY
- (United States) Yazmeen Ryan, POR
- (Canada) Christine Sinclair, POR
- (United States) Morgan Weaver, POR
- (Brazil) Angelina, RGN
- (United States) Alana Cook, RGN
- (United States) Sam Hiatt, RGN
- (United States) Sofia Huerta, RGN
- (United States) Veronica Latsko, RGN
- (United States) Rose Lavelle, RGN
- (United States) Nikki Stanton, RGN
- (United States) Olivia Van der Jagt, RGN
- (United States) Ally Watt, RGN
- (United States) Amirah Ali, SD
- (United States) Belle Briede, SD
- (United States) Taylor Kornieck, SD
- (United States) Kaleigh Riehl, SD
- (England) Jodie Taylor, SD
- (United States) Andi Sullivan, WAS

1 own goal

- (United States) Hailie Mace, KC (against LOU)
- (United States) Megan Montefusco, ORL (against NC)
- (United States) Tegan McGrady, SD (against LA)
- (United States) Taylor Aylmer, WAS (against NC)

Source: NWSL

Statistics do not include penalty-shootout goals.

=== Discipline ===
A player was automatically suspended for the next match in the tournament for the following offenses:

- Receiving a red card (red card suspensions may be extended for serious offenses);
- Receiving two yellow cards in two matches, unless the second yellow card was accumulated in the final match of group play;
- Direct red card suspensions were carried over to the 2022 NWSL regular season. Suspensions as a result of indirect red cards were not carried over.

The following suspensions were served during the tournament:

Player / Coach	Offense(s)	Suspension
(United States) Amber Brooks, WAS	(yellow card) (yellow-red card) vs. NJY, March 25	vs. NC, March 30
(United States) Savannah McCaskill, LA	(red card) vs. RGN, March 26	vs. POR, March 30
(United States) Lauren Barnes, RGN	(yellow card) vs. POR, March 18; (yellow card) vs. LA, March 26	vs. POR, April 2
(United States) Kylie Strom, ORL	(yellow card) vs. WAS, March 19; (yellow card) vs. NJY, March 30	vs. WAS, April 3
(United States) McCall Zerboni, NJY	(yellow card) vs. WAS, March 25; (yellow card) vs. ORL, March 30	vs. NC, April 3
(United States) Tegan McGrady, SD	(yellow card) vs. LA, March 19; (yellow card) vs. LA, April 2	vs. RGN, April 14
(Canada) Bianca St-Georges, CHI	(yellow card) vs. HOU, March 20; (yellow card) vs. HOU, April 2	vs. LOU, April 16
(United States) Malia Berkely, NC	(yellow card) vs. WAS, March 30; (yellow card) vs. NJY, April 3	vs. ORL, April 16
(Ghana) Jennifer Cudjoe, NJY	(yellow card) vs. NCC, March 19; (yellow card) vs. NCC, April 3	vs. WAS, April 17
(United States) Taylor Aylmer, WAS	(yellow card) vs. ORL, March 19; (yellow card) vs. NJY, April 17	vs. NCC, April 23
(United States) Kristen McNabb, SD	(yellow card) vs. LA, March 19; (yellow card) vs. POR, April 17	vs. RGN, April 23
(United States) Kelcie Hedge, HOU	(yellow card) vs. LOU, March 25; (yellow card) vs. KCC, April 15	vs. LOU, April 24
(United States) Ava Cook, CHI	(yellow card) vs. KCC, March 25; (yellow card) vs. LOU, April 16	vs. KCC, April 24
(Sweden) Freja Olofsson, LOU	(yellow card) vs. HOU, March 25; (yellow card) vs. CHI, April 16	vs. HOU, April 24

== Awards ==
=== All-Tournament Team ===
Debinha was named the MVP for the second consecutive Challenge Cup.

Pos.	Player	Club
GK	(United States) Phallon Tullis-Joyce	OL Reign
DF	(United States) Carson Pickett	North Carolina Courage
DF	(New Zealand) Abby Erceg	North Carolina Courage
DF	(United States) Alana Cook	OL Reign
DF	(United States) Sofia Huerta	OL Reign
MF	(United States) Rose Lavelle	OL Reign
MF	(United States) Ashley Sanchez	Washington Spirit
MF	(Brazil) Debinha ^{#}	North Carolina Courage
FW	(United States) Kristen Hamilton	Kansas City Current
FW	(United States) Ashley Hatch	Washington Spirit
FW	(United States) Trinity Rodman	Washington Spirit

^{#} Tournament MVP

=== Weekly awards ===
Week	Player of the Week		Save of the Week		Ref.
Week	Player	Club	Player	Club	Ref.
1	(United States) Mallory Pugh	Chicago Red Stars	(Canada) Kailen Sheridan	San Diego Wave FC	
2	(Mexico) María Sánchez	Houston Dash	(United States) Phallon Tullis-Joyce	OL Reign	
3	(United States) Alex Morgan	San Diego Wave FC	(United States) Phallon Tullis-Joyce (2)	OL Reign	
4	(Japan) Hina Sugita	Portland Thorns FC	(United States) Phallon Tullis-Joyce (3)	OL Reign	
5	(United States) Elyse Bennett	Kansas City Current	(United States) Kristen Edmonds	Kansas City Current	
