= Kristen Hamilton =

American soccer player (born 1992)

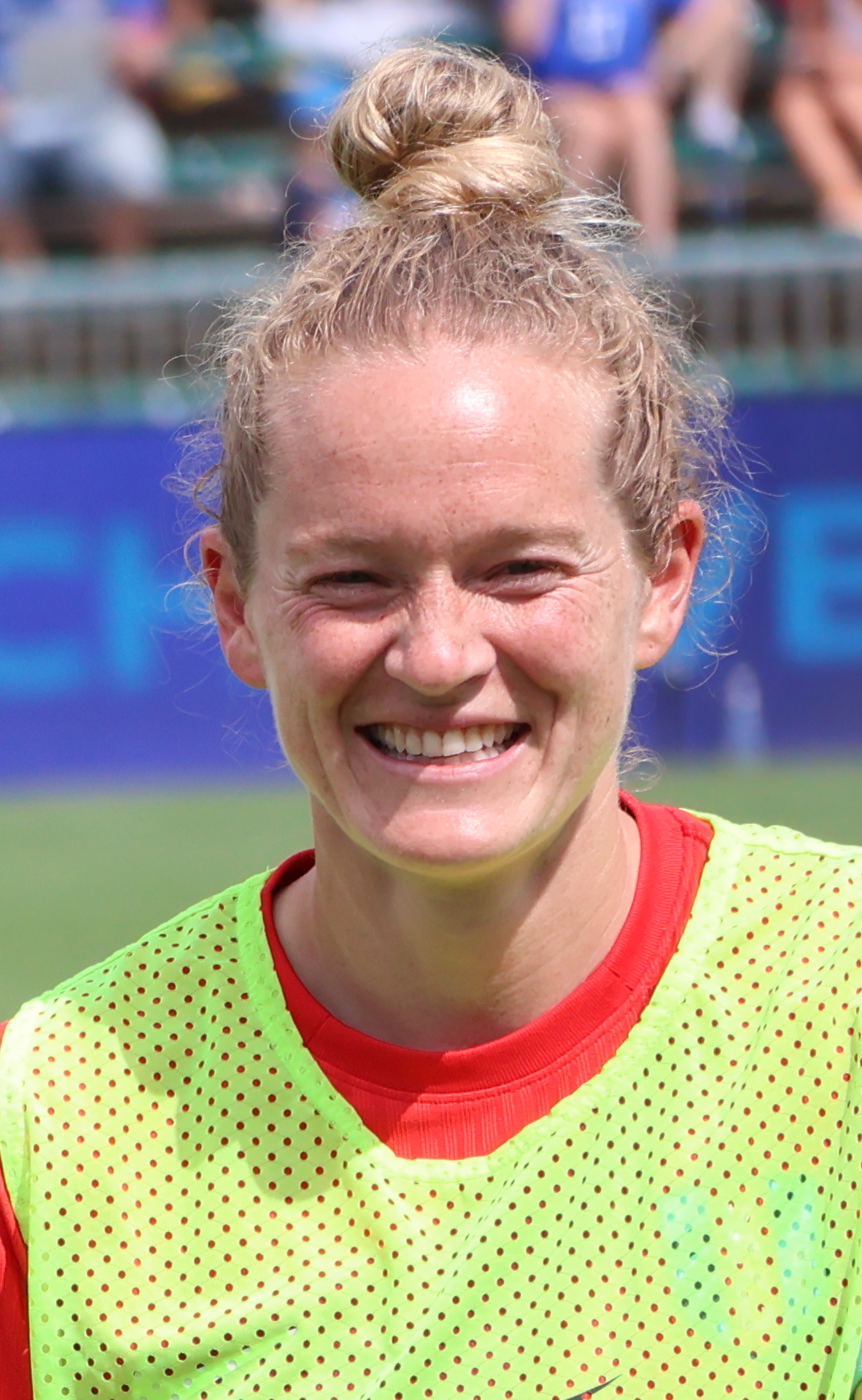
- Hamilton with the Kansas City Current in 2024

Personal information
- Full name: Kristen Marie Hamilton
- Date of birth: April 17, 1992 (age 34)
- Place of birth: Littleton, Colorado, U.S.
- Height: 1.62 m (5 ft 4 in)
- Position: Forward

College career
Years	Team	Apps	(Gls)
2010–2013	Denver Pioneers	88	(51)

Senior career*
Years	Team	Apps	(Gls)
2012–2014	Colorado Rapids Women	20	(12)
2014–2016	Western New York Flash	25	(0)
2017–2021	North Carolina Courage	67	(15)
2019–2020	→ Western Sydney Wanderers (loan)	12	(7)
2021–2025	Kansas City Current	53	(10)
Total		177	(44)

International career^{‡}
2019	United States	1	(0)
- * Club domestic league appearances and goals as of February 23, 2026 ‡ National team caps and goals as of February 29, 2020

Kristen Marie Hamilton (born April 17, 1992) is an American former professional soccer player who played as a forward. Hamilton played college soccer for the Denver Pioneers in her home state of Colorado, where she set multiple program records. She was selected with the last pick of the 2014 NWSL College Draft by the Western New York Flash (which later became the North Carolina Courage). During her stint with the Flash / Courage, the team won three NWSL Championships and three NWSL Shields.

In the NWSL offseason in 2019–20, Hamilton played for the Western Sydney Wanderers of the W-League in Australia and received the Julie Dolan Medal as the league's best player. She was traded to the Kansas City Current in 2021, where she played the remaining five seasons of her professional career and won her fourth NWSL Shield in 2025. Hamilton has also made one appearance for the United States national team.

== Early life ==
Hamilton grew up in Littleton, Colorado, and played club soccer for the Colorado Storm. She attended Columbine High School from 2006 to 2010, where she was a varsity soccer player from her freshman year and committed to the University of Denver as a sophomore.

== College career ==
=== University of Denver Pioneers, 2010–2013 ===
Hamilton attended the University of Denver from 2010 to 2013 where she played NCAA Division I soccer for the Denver Pioneers and became the school's all-time leader in points (138), goals (51), and game-winning goals (18). Hamilton finished her career ranked third at Denver in all-time assists with 36 and fifth nationally, and was the first player in NCAA history to win player of the year honors in three different leagues: the Sun Belt Conference, the Summit League, and the Western Athletic Conference. She was also named a MAC Hermann Trophy semifinalist in 2013.

She was one 25 NCAA players, in all divisions, to have 30+ goals and 20+ assists in their career and the only NCAA Division I athlete in history to be named player of the year in three different conferences. She ranked fourth in career points and sixth in goals. Starting all 88 games in the forward position, she averaged 0.58 goals and 0.41 assists per game, ranking No. 21 in goals and No. 5 in assists per game nationally.

In 2011, Hamilton was named Female Athlete of the year by the University of Denver and the team's Most Valuable Player. The following year in 2012, she was named NSCAA Third Team All-American and to the First Team All-West Region. She was named WAC Player of the Year and was a First Team All-WAC selection. The same year, she was twice named WAC Offensive Player of the Week for the weeks of September 10 and 24. She was also named College Sports 360's National Player of the week for Week 6.

In 2013, Hamilton was named NSCAA First Team All-American, First Team All-Great Lakes Region, and Summit League Offensive Player of the Year. She was also a MAC Hermann Trophy Semifinalist and 2013 Senior CLASS Award Finalist. She was named to the First Team All-Summit League, Summit League All-Tournament Team and was the Summit League Tournament MVP. Hamilton earned 2013 Summit League All-Academic Team honors and was named Capital One Academic All-American as well as NSCAA Scholar All-American. She was the Summit League's Player of the Week twice for the weeks of August 26 and September 16, 2013. She was named to the Top Drawer Soccer National Team of the Week on September 18, 2013.

== Club career ==
=== Colorado Rapids Women, 2012–2014 ===
Hamilton played for two seasons for the Colorado Rapids Women in the W-League under Coach Daniel Clitnovici. In 2012 the USL W-League was the highest tier of professional women's soccer in the US and Hamilton enjoyed a great season scoring 6 times in 10 games against some of the best players in the country. Hamilton was able to lead the Colorado Rapids to a successful Inaugural season finishing 4th of 8 teams in the Western Conference, arguably the strongest conference in the USL W-League.

=== Western New York Flash, 2014–2016 ===
Hamilton was selected by the Western New York Flash as the 36th overall pick of the 2014 NWSL College Draft. She was the first University of Denver graduate to be selected in an NWSL draft. She did not play the 2014 season due to an ACL injury suffered in a collision with an opposing goalkeeper during a pre-season match.

Hamilton was part of the Flash team that won the 2016 NWSL Championship, entering the match as a substitute in extra time.

=== North Carolina Courage, 2017–2021 ===
Following the 2016 season, the Western New York Flash was sold and relocated to North Carolina. She appeared in 16 regular season games for the Courage during the 2017 season, scoring 4 goals. She appeared in North Carolina's semi-final match as a first-half substitute, replacing the injured Debinha. Hamilton was in the starting line-up for the 2017 NWSL Championship game but was substituted out in the 39th minute after sustaining an injury. The Courage went on to lose the championship game 1–0 to Portland Thorns FC.

In 2018, Hamilton played in 23 regular season games for North Carolina, starting 8 games. She scored 3 goals as North Carolina won the 2018 NWSL Shield. Hamilton appeared in the semi-final game as a second-half substitute as North Carolina defeated the Chicago Red Stars to advance to their second straight final. She was a second-half substitute in the championship match, which North Carolina won 3–0 over Portland to secure the 2018 NWSL Championship.

In 2019, Hamilton played in 22 games and scored 9 goals for North Carolina. While several Courage players participated in the 2019 FIFA Women's World Cup during June and July, Hamilton scored her first career NWSL hat-trick against Orlando Pride in June, followed by a four-goal match against Houston Dash in July that tied the league record for most goals scored by a player in a single match. She was subsequently named to the league's Team of the Month in both months and featured on SportsCenter's Top 10 plays. By the end of the season, she was one of three Courage players nominated for the league's Most Valuable Player award alongside Debinha and Jaelene Daniels, and was also named to the league's annual Second Best XI roster.

Hamilton was a 75th-minute substitute in the 2019 NWSL Championship match, which North Carolina won 4–0 over Chicago.

In 2020, the Courage extended Hamilton's contract through 2022.

==== Loan to Western Sydney Wanderers, 2019–2020 ====
North Carolina Courage loaned Hamilton to Western Sydney Wanderers of the Australian W-League following the 2019 NWSL season. Her seven-goal performance tied her for the W-League Golden Boot and earned her the season's Julie Dolan Medal as the league's top player as selected by a panel of voters. Hamilton was the first Wanderers player to win either award.

=== Kansas City Current, 2021–2025 ===
On July 22, 2021, the Courage announced that it had traded Hamilton, defender Hailie Mace, and goalkeeper Katelyn Rowland to Kansas City NWSL in exchange for Amy Rodriguez. The transaction occurred in the middle of the 2021 season and less than a day prior to the Courage playing against Kansas City. The July 23 match would be Hamilton's debut with Kansas City, and Hamilton expressed surprise at the trade and disappointment with how it was handled during the post-match press conference. A later story reported that Hamilton and the other traded players had reported to Courage practice on July 21, were individually informed of the trade, and then asked to leave the practice facility after informing the rest of the team in order to comply with league policies. Hamilton said the Courage players had received no other advance warning of the trade, and described the process as being "blindsided".

In 2021, Hamilton played 14 games and scored 1 goal for Kansas City. On August 25, 2021, Hamilton made her 100th NWSL appearance against Racing Louisville FC, where she scored the match-winning goal in the 40th minute.

In December 2021, the newly renamed Kansas City Current announced that it had re-signed Hamilton to a three-year contract.

In 2022, Hamilton played 32 games and scored 12 goals across all competitions. Her five goals in the 2022 NWSL Challenge Cup, seven regular season goals, and one playoff goal set a Current record for most total goals scored across official NWSL competitions in a single season. With Kansas City's appearance in the 2022 NWSL Championship, Hamilton made her fifth appearance in a league championship match, setting an NWSL career record.

Hamilton was the top scorer in the 2023 NWSL Challenge Cup, scoring 5 goals en route to winning the overall MVP of the tournament. Hamilton scored the first hat-trick in Kansas City Current history and NWSL Challenge Cup history on July 22, 2023, securing a 3–1 victory over the Houston Dash.

On March 16, 2024, Hamilton came off the bench to notch a goal in the 64th minute for the Kansas City Current, who edged out the Portland Thorns 5–4 in the inaugural match at CPKC Stadium.

On January 27, 2025, the Current announced that Hamilton had signed a one-year contract extension with the club. She was part of the Current's historic 2025 season, which saw the club win its first NWSL Shield and break league single-season records for most wins (21), points (65), and shutouts (16). In October 2025, Hamilton announced her plans to retire from professional soccer at the conclusion of the season.

== International career ==
Hamilton was called up as an overaged player to the United States U23 team on August 21, 2019. Five days later, she received her first call-up to the senior team due to a number of injuries.

On September 3, 2019, Hamilton earned her first cap with the United States senior team, coming on in the second half for fellow Courage teammate Jessica McDonald in a friendly against Portugal.

== Personal life ==
Hamilton was previously in a relationship with former New Zealand international Abby Erceg. She is currently engaged to her former Current teammate Elizabeth Ball.

Hamilton has experience in remodeling residential homes, including a bathroom renovation in Colorado. In 2024, Hamilton founded Pitchside Coffee along with Kansas City Current teammates Elizabeth Ball, Vanessa DiBernardo, Hailie Mace, Desiree Scott, and Mallory Weber. Pitchside Coffee became an official restaurant partner of CPKC Stadium in 2025.

== Honors ==
Western New York Flash

- NWSL Championship: 2016

North Carolina Courage

- NWSL Championship: 2018, 2019
- NWSL Shield: 2017, 2018, 2019

Kansas City Current

- NWSL Shield: 2025
- NWSL x Liga MX Femenil Summer Cup: 2024

Individual

- 2013 MAC Hermann Trophy semifinalist
- 2013 Senior CLASS Award finalist
- 2019 NWSL Most Valuable Player finalist
- 2019 NWSL Second XI
- 2019–20 Julie Dolan Medal, voted best player in the 2019–20 W-League
- 2019–20 W-League Golden Boot (tied)
- 2022 NWSL Challenge Cup All-Tournament Team
- 2023 NWSL Challenge Cup All-Tournament Team
- 2023 NWSL Challenge Cup Most Valuable Player
