= 2022 National Women's Soccer League season =

Tenth season of the National Women's Soccer League

National Women's Soccer League
- Season: 2022
- Dates: April 29–October 29
- Champions: Portland Thorns FC (3rd title)
- NWSL Shield: OL Reign (3rd shield)
- Challenge Cup: North Carolina Courage (1st cup)
- Matches: 132
- Goals: 367 (2.78 per match)
- Top goalscorer: Alex Morgan (15 goals)
- Best goalkeeper: Bella Bixby, Phallon Tullis-Joyce (9 clean sheets)
- Biggest home win: POR 6–0 ORL (June 19)
- Biggest away win: LOU 0–4 CHI (August 27); HOU 0–4 POR (June 12)
- Highest scoring: NC 3–4 HOU (June 19); NC 3–4 KC (August 13); WAS 4–3 SD (September 10)
- Longest winning run: 3 games SD (May 1 – May 18); KC (July 1 – July 31); HOU (July 16 – August 12)
- Longest unbeaten run: 13 games KC (May 30 – Sept 14)
- Longest winless run: 16 games WAS (May 15 – September 10)
- Longest losing run: 12 games NJY (July 16 – October 1)
- Highest attendance: 32,000; SD vs. LA (Sept 17)
- Lowest attendance: 1,961; WAS vs. CHI (June 1)
- Total attendance: 1,045,095
- Average attendance: 7,917

The 2022 National Women's Soccer League season was the tenth season of the National Women's Soccer League, the top division of women's soccer in the United States. Including the NWSL's two professional predecessors, Women's Professional Soccer (2009–2011) and the Women's United Soccer Association (2001–2003), it was the 16th overall season of FIFA and USSF-sanctioned top division women's soccer in the United States. Twelve teams competed in the league, including two expansion teams, San Diego Wave FC and Angel City FC.

The NWSL regular season, comprising 22 games for each team, began on April 29 and ended on October 2, 2022. OL Reign topped the standing with 40 points and thus won the NWSL Shield. The championship playoffs were held from October 16–29 and were won by Portland Thorns FC, who defeated the Kansas City Current 2-0 in the final and thus became the NWSL champions. The year also included the 2022 NWSL Challenge Cup, which was played from March 18 to May 7 and overlapped with the start of the regular season. It was won by the North Carolina Courage, who defeated the Washington Spirit 2-1 in the final.

This season was the first in which the total attendance exceeded one million.

== Teams, stadiums, and personnel ==
=== Team names ===
On October 21, 2020, the Los Angeles expansion team announced its name as Angel City FC.

On October 30, 2021, the NWSL franchise in Kansas City announced its new name as Kansas City Current.

On November 9, 2021, the San Diego expansion team announced its name as San Diego Wave FC.

=== Stadiums and locations ===
Capacities listed here are full capacities, and do not reflect COVID-19 restrictions.

Team	Stadium	Capacity
Angel City FC	Banc of California Stadium	22,000
Angel City FC	Titan Stadium (Note: Angel City FC played its Challenge Cup home games at Titan Stadium.)	10,000
Chicago Red Stars	SeatGeek Stadium	20,000
Houston Dash	PNC Stadium	7,000 (Note: PNC Stadium has a capacity of 22,039, but the maximum capacity for Dash games is restricted to 7,000.)
Kansas City Current	Children's Mercy Park	18,467
NJ/NY Gotham FC	Red Bull Arena	25,000
North Carolina Courage	WakeMed Soccer Park	10,000
OL Reign	Lumen Field	10,000 (Note: Lumen Field has a capacity of 68,740; standard configuration for Reign games seats 10,000 but can expand based on demand for individual games.)
Orlando Pride	Exploria Stadium	25,500
Portland Thorns FC	Providence Park	25,218
Racing Louisville FC	Lynn Family Stadium	11,700 (Note: Seated capacity; full capacity with standing room is 15,304.)
San Diego Wave FC	Torero Stadium	6,000
San Diego Wave FC	Snapdragon Stadium (Note: Wave FC played its first match at Snapdragon Stadium on September 17, 2022.)	35,000
Washington Spirit	Audi Field	20,000
Washington Spirit	Segra Field (Note: Since 2020 the Spirit, in a partnership with Major League Soccer franchise D.C. United, divides its home matches between two venues operated by D.C. United: Audi Field in Washington, D.C., and Segra Field in Leesburg, Virginia.)	5,000

Locations of the National Women's Soccer League teams in 2022.

=== Personnel and sponsorship ===
Note: All teams use Nike as their kit manufacturer as part of a league-wide sponsorship agreement renewed in November 2021.

Team	Head coach	Captain	Shirt sponsor
Angel City FC	(England) Freya Coombe	(New Zealand) Ali Riley	DoorDash
Chicago Red Stars	(United States) Chris Petrucelli	(United States) Vanessa DiBernardo	CIBC
Houston Dash	(Spain) Juan Carlos Amorós (interim)	(United States) Jane Campbell (United States) Katie Naughton	MD Anderson Cancer Center
Kansas City Current	(England) Matt Potter	(United States) Sam Mewis (Canada) Desiree Scott	Saint Luke's Health System
NJ/NY Gotham FC	(England) Hue Menzies (interim)	(United States) McCall Zerboni	Algorand
North Carolina Courage	(United States) Sean Nahas	(New Zealand) Abby Erceg	Continental AG
OL Reign	(England) Laura Harvey	(United States) Lauren Barnes (United States) Megan Rapinoe	Black Future Co-op Fund
Orlando Pride	(England) Seb Hines (interim)	(Brazil) Marta	Orlando Health
Portland Thorns FC	(Canada) Rhian Wilkinson	(Canada) Christine Sinclair	Providence Health & Services
Racing Louisville FC	(Sweden) Kim Björkegren	(England) Gemma Bonner (United States) Emily Fox (United States) Jessica McDonald (Denmark) Nadia Nadim	GE Appliances
San Diego Wave FC	(England) Casey Stoney	(United States) Alex Morgan	Kaiser Permanente
Washington Spirit	(United States) Albertin Montoya (interim)	(United States) Tori Huster (United States) Andi Sullivan	The Kennedy Center (home); CVS Health (away)

=== Coaching changes ===
Team	Outgoing coach	Manner of departure	Date of vacancy	Position in table	Incoming coach	Date of appointment	Ref.
Washington Spirit	(England) Richie Burke	Re-assigned (Note: The Spirit initially re-assigned Burke to the front office but suspended him one day later pending an investigation by the league. He was terminated for cause on September 28, 2021, after the league concluded its investigation.)	August 10, 2021	7th in 2021	(United States) Kris Ward	December 20, 2021	
San Diego Wave FC				Preseason	(England) Casey Stoney	July 14, 2021	
Angel City FC				Preseason	(England) Freya Coombe	August 23, 2021	
Orlando Pride	(United States) Becky Burleigh (interim)	End of interim period	October 30, 2021	Preseason	(United States) Amanda Cromwell	December 7, 2021	
Racing Louisville FC	(United States) Mario Sanchez (interim)	End of interim period	November 1, 2021	Preseason	(Sweden) Kim Björkegren	December 9, 2021	
North Carolina Courage	(United States) Sean Nahas (interim)	End of interim period	November 8, 2021	Preseason	(United States) Sean Nahas	December 1, 2021	
Portland Thorns FC	(England) Mark Parsons	Resigned	November 15, 2021	Preseason	(Canada) Rhian Wilkinson	November 29, 2021	
Kansas City Current	(Wales) Huw Williams	Re-assigned	November 18, 2021	Preseason	(England) Matt Potter	January 11, 2022	
Chicago Red Stars	(United States) Rory Dames	Resigned	November 22, 2021	Preseason	(United States) Chris Petrucelli	February 18, 2022	
Houston Dash	(England) James Clarkson	Suspended	April 26, 2022	Preseason	(England) Sarah Lowdon (acting)	April 29, 2022	
Orlando Pride	(United States) Amanda Cromwell	Placed on administrative leave (Note: The league terminated Cromwell's employment on October 10, 2022, after an investigation found that she "engaged in retaliation and attempted retaliation against [certain] Pride players.")	June 7, 2022	9th	(England) Seb Hines (interim)	June 7, 2022	
Houston Dash	(England) Sarah Lowdon (acting)	End of acting period	July 12, 2022 (Note: Although the Dash appointed Amorós on June 15, 2022, Lowdon remained the acting head coach until Amorós's arrival on July 12, 2022.)	6th	(Spain) Juan Carlos Amorós (interim)	June 15, 2022	
NJ/NY Gotham FC	(England) Scott Parkinson	Mutual separation	August 11, 2022	11th	(United States) Beverly Goebel Yanez (acting) (Note: Although Gotham FC appointed Menzies on August 13, 2022, he did not join the team in time and Goebel Yanez acted as de facto head coach for one game on August 14, 2022.)	August 14, 2022	
NJ/NY Gotham FC	(United States) Beverly Goebel Yanez (acting)	End of acting period	August 15, 2022	11th	(England) Hue Menzies (interim)	August 13, 2022	
Washington Spirit	(United States) Kris Ward	Fired	August 22, 2022	11th	(United States) Angela Salem (acting) (Note: After firing Ward, the Spirit had identified an interim head coach but could not complete the appointment before their next game. Therefore, Salem acted as de facto head coach for one game on August 27, 2022.)	August 27, 2022	
Washington Spirit	(United States) Angela Salem (acting)	End of acting period	August 28, 2022	11th	(United States) Albertin Montoya (interim)	September 2, 2022	

== Regular season ==
=== Standings ===
Pos	Team	Pld	W	D	L	GF	GA	GD	Pts	Qualification
1	OL Reign	22	11	7	4	32	19	+13	40	NWSL Shield, Playoffs – semi-finals
2	Portland Thorns FC (C)	22	10	9	3	49	24	+25	39	Playoffs – semi-finals
3	San Diego Wave FC	22	10	6	6	32	21	+11	36	Playoffs – first round
4	Houston Dash	22	10	6	6	35	27	+8	36	Playoffs – first round
5	Kansas City Current	22	10	6	6	29	29	0	36	Playoffs – first round
6	Chicago Red Stars	22	9	6	7	34	28	+6	33	Playoffs – first round
7	North Carolina Courage	22	9	5	8	46	33	+13	32	
8	Angel City FC	22	8	5	9	23	27	−4	29	
9	Racing Louisville FC	22	5	8	9	23	35	−12	23	
10	Orlando Pride	22	5	7	10	22	45	−23	22	
11	Washington Spirit	22	3	10	9	26	33	−7	19	
12	NJ/NY Gotham FC	22	4	1	17	16	46	−30	13	

Source: NWSL
Rules for classification: Tiebreakers
(C) Champions

==== Tiebreakers ====
The initial determining factor for a team's position in the standings is most points earned, with three points earned for a win, one point for a draw, and zero points for a loss. If two or more teams tie in total points total when determining rank, playoff qualification, and seeding, the NWSL uses the following tiebreaker criteria, going down the list until all teams are ranked.

1. Greater goal difference across the entire regular season (against all teams, not just tied teams).
2. Most total wins across the entire regular season (against all teams, not just tied teams).
3. Most goals scored across the entire regular season (against all teams, not just tied teams).
4. Head-to-head results (total points) between the tied teams.
5. Head-to-head most goals scored between the tied teams.
6. Least disciplinary points accumulated across the entire regular season (against all teams, not just tied teams).
7. Coin flip (if two teams are tied) or drawing of lots (if three or more teams are tied).

=== Results ===
Home \ Away	CHI	HOU	KC	LA	LOU	NC	NJY	ORL	POR	RGN	SD	WAS
Chicago Red Stars	—	0–1	4–0	2–0	2–1	2–2	2–0	1–0	2–2	1–0	0–1	0–0
Houston Dash	4–1	—	1–2	1–1	0–0	1–1	2–1	5–0	0–4	0–2	0–1	2–2
Kansas City Current	2–2	0–2	—	1–1	1–0	3–2	1–0	2–2	1–1	1–0	2–2	3–0
Angel City FC	1–0	0–0	1–0	—	1–3	2–1	0–1	0–1	1–1	2–3	2–1	2–1
Racing Louisville FC	0–4	1–1	1–0	2–3	—	0–3	1–2	2–0	1–2	1–1	1–0	1–1
North Carolina Courage	4–0	3–4	3–4	1–0	5–1	—	3–0	1–2	3–1	1–2	0–1	3–3
NJ/NY Gotham FC	0–3	2–4	0–1	1–3	0–1	0–1	—	1–2	3–3	0–1	0–3	1–0
Orlando Pride	2–4	1–0	2–2	2–2	2–2	0–3	0–3	—	0–2	1–2	2–2	2–2
Portland Thorns FC	3–0	0–2	3–0	3–0	3–0	3–3	5–0	6–0	—	0–0	0–2	1–1
OL Reign	2–2	1–2	1–0	1–0	2–2	2–0	4–1	3–0	2–2	—	1–0	0–0
San Diego Wave FC	2–1	3–1	1–2	1–0	0–0	0–0	4–0	0–1	2–2	1–1	—	2–1
Washington Spirit	1–1	1–2	0–1	0–1	2–2	2–3	2–0	0–0	1–2	2–1	4–3	—

Source: NWSL
Legend: Blue = home team win; Yellow = draw; Red = away team win.

=== Positions by week ===
Considering each week to end when the NWSL releases their weekly standing tweet

Team \ Week	1	2	3	4	5	6	7	8	9	10	11	12	13	14	15	16	17	18	19	20
OL Reign	8	10	10	9	3	6	6	5	4	4	6	5	6	5	5	5	5	5	2	1
Portland Thorns FC	2	2	3	7	8	4	3	2	3	3	2	2	1	1	1	4	3	4	1	2
San Diego Wave FC	6	1	1	1	1	1	1	1	1	1	1	1	2	3	2	1	2	1	4	3
Houston Dash	10	5	4	4	4	2	5	4	5	6	4	3	3	2	3	2	4	2	5	4
Kansas City Current	12	12	11	11	11	11	10	10	7	7	5	6	5	4	4	3	1	3	3	5
Chicago Red Stars	4	4	5	6	7	3	2	3	2	2	3	4	4	6	6	6	6	6	7	6
North Carolina Courage	7	11	12	12	12	12	12	12	12	12	12	12	12	12	10	9	8	8	6	7
Angel City FC	3	6	2	2	2	7	4	6	6	5	7	7	7	7	7	7	7	7	8	8
Racing Louisville FC	9	9	9	3	5	8	9	9	8	10	10	11	9	9	9	10	11	11	10	9
Orlando Pride	11	8	6	5	6	9	11	11	11	9	8	8	8	8	8	8	9	9	9	10
Washington Spirit	5	3	7	8	9	10	8	7	9	11	11	10	10	10	11	11	10	10	11	11
NJ/NY Gotham FC	1	7	8	10	10	5	7	8	10	8	9	9	11	11	12	12	12	12	12	12

Legend: Gold = first place; green = playoff position; Red = last place.

== Attendance ==
=== Average home attendances ===
Ranked from highest to lowest average attendance.

Regular season

Team	GP	Attendance	High	Low	Average
Angel City FC	11	210,153	22,000	16,112	19,105
Portland Thorns FC	11	170,976	19,127	9,876	15,543
San Diego Wave FC	11	96,017	32,000	4,418	8,729
Kansas City Current	11	84,223	10,395	5,695	7,657
OL Reign	11	75,289	10,746	3,944	6,844
Washington Spirit	11	68,441	10,177	1,961	6,222
Racing Louisville FC	11	66,529	8,729	5,107	6,048
Chicago Red Stars	11	64,588	23,951	2,135	5,872
Houston Dash	11	62,085	7,798	4,637	5,644
North Carolina Courage	11	49,991	6,398	3,084	4,545
NJ/NY Gotham FC	11	48,563	7,145	2,130	4,415
Orlando Pride	11	48,240	7,573	3,015	4,385
Total	132	1,045,095	32,000	1,961	7,917

Updated through October 2, 2022

=== Highest attendances ===
Regular season

Rank	Home team	Score	Away team	Attendance	Date	Stadium
1	San Diego Wave FC	1–0	Angel City FC	32,000	September 17, 2022	Snapdragon Stadium
2	Chicago Red Stars	0–1	San Diego Wave FC	23,951	July 30, 2022	Soldier Field
3	Angel City FC	2–1	North Carolina Courage	22,000	April 29, 2022	Banc of California Stadium
3	Angel City FC	2–1	San Diego Wave FC	22,000	July 9, 2022	Banc of California Stadium
3	Angel City FC	2–3	OL Reign	22,000	July 30, 2022	Banc of California Stadium
3	Angel City FC	1–3	Racing Louisville FC	22,000	September 25, 2022	Banc of California Stadium
7	Angel City FC	0–1	NJ/NY Gotham FC	18,784	May 29, 2022	Banc of California Stadium
8	Portland Thorns FC	0–2	San Diego Wave FC	18,624	August 27, 2022	Providence Park
9	Angel City FC	1–0	Kansas City Current	18,514	May 21, 2022	Banc of California Stadium
10	San Diego Wave FC	0–0	North Carolina Courage	18,000	September 30, 2022	Snapdragon Stadium

Updated through October 2, 2022.

== Statistical leaders ==
As of October 2, 2022.

=== Top scorers ===
Rank	Player	Club	Goals
1	(United States) Alex Morgan	San Diego Wave FC	15
2	(United States) Sophia Smith	Portland Thorns FC	14
3	(Brazil) Debinha	North Carolina Courage	12
4	(Mexico) Diana Ordoñez	North Carolina Courage	11
4	(United States) Mallory Pugh	Chicago Red Stars	11
6	(United States) Ashley Hatch	Washington Spirit	9
6	(England) Ebony Salmon	2 teams	9
8	(United States) Bethany Balcer	OL Reign	7
8	(United States) Cece Kizer	2 teams	7
8	(United States) Lo'eau LaBonta	Kansas City Current	7
8	(United States) Savannah McCaskill	Angel City FC	7
8	(United States) Megan Rapinoe	OL Reign	7
8	(United States) Morgan Weaver	Portland Thorns FC	7

=== Top assists ===
Rank	Player	Club	Assists
1	(United States) Carson Pickett	North Carolina Courage	6
1	(United States) Mallory Pugh	Chicago Red Stars	6
3	(United States) Yazmeen Ryan	Portland Thorns FC	5
3	(United States) Ashley Sanchez	Washington Spirit	5
5	(Brazil) Debinha	North Carolina Courage	4
5	(United States) Shea Groom	Houston Dash	4
5	(United States) Sofia Huerta	OL Reign	4
5	(Brazil) Kerolin	North Carolina Courage	4
5	(United States) Lo'eau LaBonta	Kansas City Current	4
5	(United States) Jessica McDonald	Racing Louisville FC	4
5	(United States) Olivia Moultrie	Portland Thorns FC	4
5	(United States) Megan Rapinoe	OL Reign	4
5	(Mexico) María Sánchez	Houston Dash	4
5	(Japan) Hina Sugita	Portland Thorns FC	4

=== Clean sheets ===
Rank	Player	Club	Clean sheets
1	(United States) Bella Bixby	Portland Thorns FC	9
1	(United States) Phallon Tullis-Joyce	OL Reign	9
3	(Canada) Kailen Sheridan	San Diego Wave FC	8
4	(United States) Alyssa Naeher	Chicago Red Stars	7
5	(United States) Jane Campbell	Houston Dash	6
5	(United States) Katie Lund	Racing Louisville FC	6
5	(United States) Casey Murphy	North Carolina Courage	6
8	(United States) Adrianna Franch	Kansas City Current	5
9	(Bosnia and Herzegovina) DiDi Haračić	Angel City FC	4
9	(Canada) Erin McLeod	Orlando Pride	4

=== Hat-tricks ===
Player	For	Against	Score	Date
(United States) Alex Morgan ^{4}	San Diego Wave FC	NJ/NY Gotham FC	4–0	May 7
(Canada) Nichelle Prince	Houston Dash	Orlando Pride	5–0	June 3
(England) Ebony Salmon	Houston Dash	Chicago Red Stars	4–1	July 16
(Brazil) Debinha	North Carolina Courage	NJ/NY Gotham FC	3–0	September 24

^{4} Player scored 4 goals

== Playoffs ==
The top six teams from the regular season qualified for the NWSL Championship playoffs, with the top two teams receiving a first-round bye. On August 23, 2022, the league announced that the championship match would be held on October 29, 2022, at Audi Field in Washington, D.C., with domestic broadcast on CBS and a prime-time kickoff at 8 p.m. EDT.

First round
4	Houston Dash	1
5	Kansas City Current	2
3	San Diego Wave FC (a.e.t.)	2
6	Chicago Red Stars	1

Semi-finals
1	OL Reign	0
5	Kansas City Current	2
2	Portland Thorns FC	2
3	San Diego Wave FC	1

Championship
5	Kansas City Current	0
2	Portland Thorns FC	2

=== First round ===
October 16, 2022
17:00 EDT

Houston Dash	1–2	Kansas City Current
Schmidt 21'	Report	LaBonta 5' (pen.); Del Fava 90+10'

PNC Stadium, Houston, Texas
Attendance: 21,284
Referee: Elijio Arreguin
October 16, 2022
22:30 EDT

San Diego Wave FC	2–1 (a.e.t.)	Chicago Red Stars
van Egmond 67'; Morgan 110'	Report	Nagasato 10'

Snapdragon Stadium, San Diego, California
Attendance: 26,215
Referee: Mark Allatin

=== Semi-finals ===
October 23, 2022
17:00 EDT

Portland Thorns FC	2–1	San Diego Wave FC
Rodríguez 20'; Dunn 90+3'	Report	Kornieck 8'

Providence Park, Portland, Oregon
Attendance: 22,035
Referee: Kevin Broadley
October 23, 2022
19:30 EDT

OL Reign	0–2	Kansas City Current
	Report	Loera 4'; Hamilton 63'

Lumen Field, Seattle, Washington
Attendance: 21,491
Referee: Alex Billeter

=== Championship ===
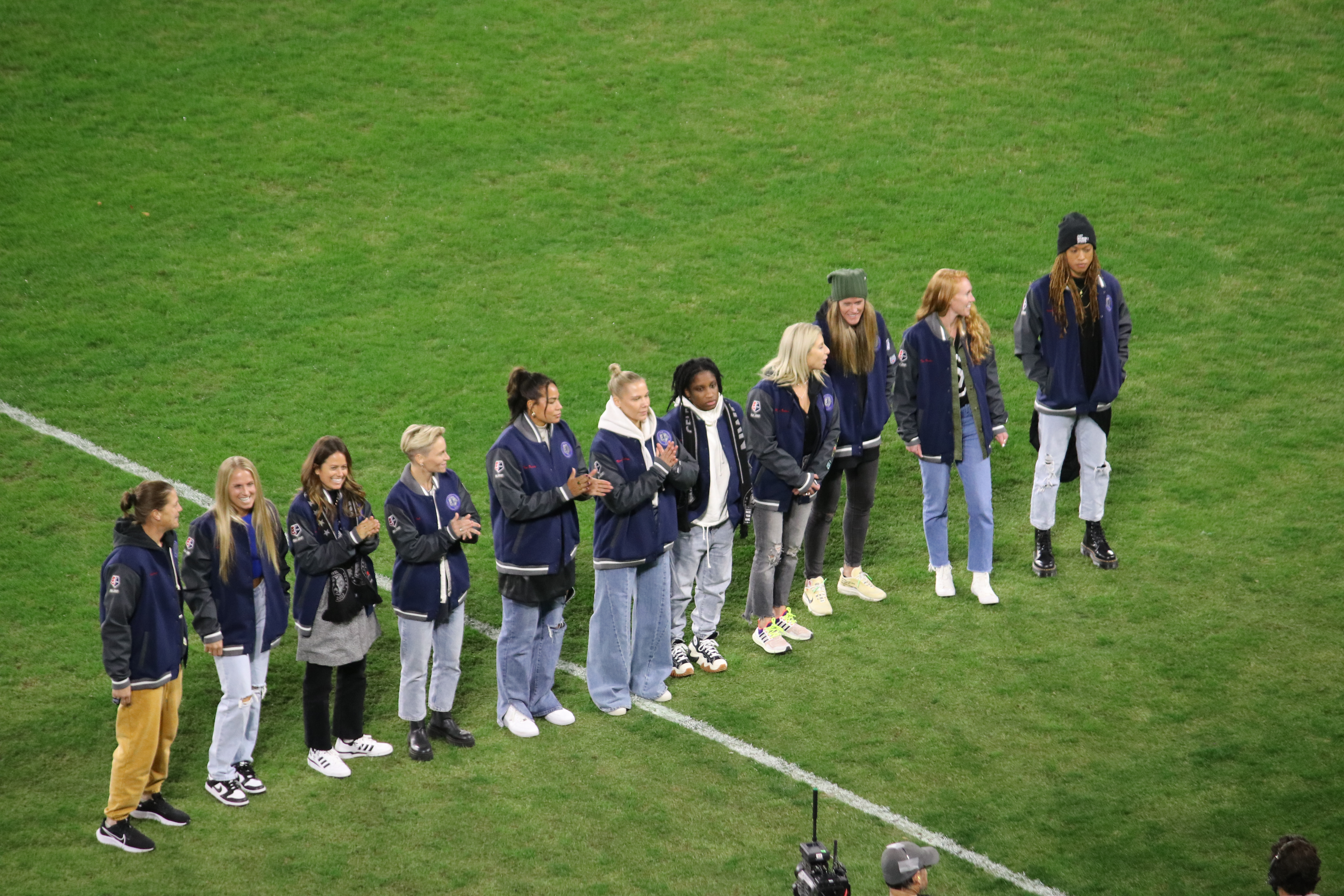
Players who had competed in all 10 NWSL seasons. Left to right: Nicole Barnhart, Alyssa Mautz, Lauren Barnes, Jess Fishlock, Toni Pressley, Merritt Mathias, Jasmyne Spencer, McCall Zerboni, Alyssa Naeher, Tori Huster, Jessica McDonald. Not shown: Ashlyn Harris, Ali Krieger, Sydney Leroux, Allie Long, Kristie Mewis, Alex Morgan, Kelley O'Hara, Megan Rapinoe, Becky Sauerbrunn, Christine Sinclair.

Before the championship game, the NWSL recognized the 21 players who had been in the league for all 10 years of its existence.

October 29, 2022
20:00 EDT

Portland Thorns FC	2–0	Kansas City Current
Smith 4'; Merrick 56' (o.g.)	Report

Audi Field, Washington, D.C.
Attendance: 17,624
Referee: Natalie Simon

Championship Game MVP: Sophia Smith (POR)

== Challenge Cup ==
=== Championship ===
May 7
13:00 ET

North Carolina Courage	2–1	Washington Spirit
Kerolin 10'; Aylmer 70' (o.g.)	Report	Hatch 35'

WakeMed Soccer Park, Cary, North Carolina
Attendance: 3,163
Referee: Katja Koroleva

== Individual awards ==
As of October 27, 2022

=== Annual awards ===
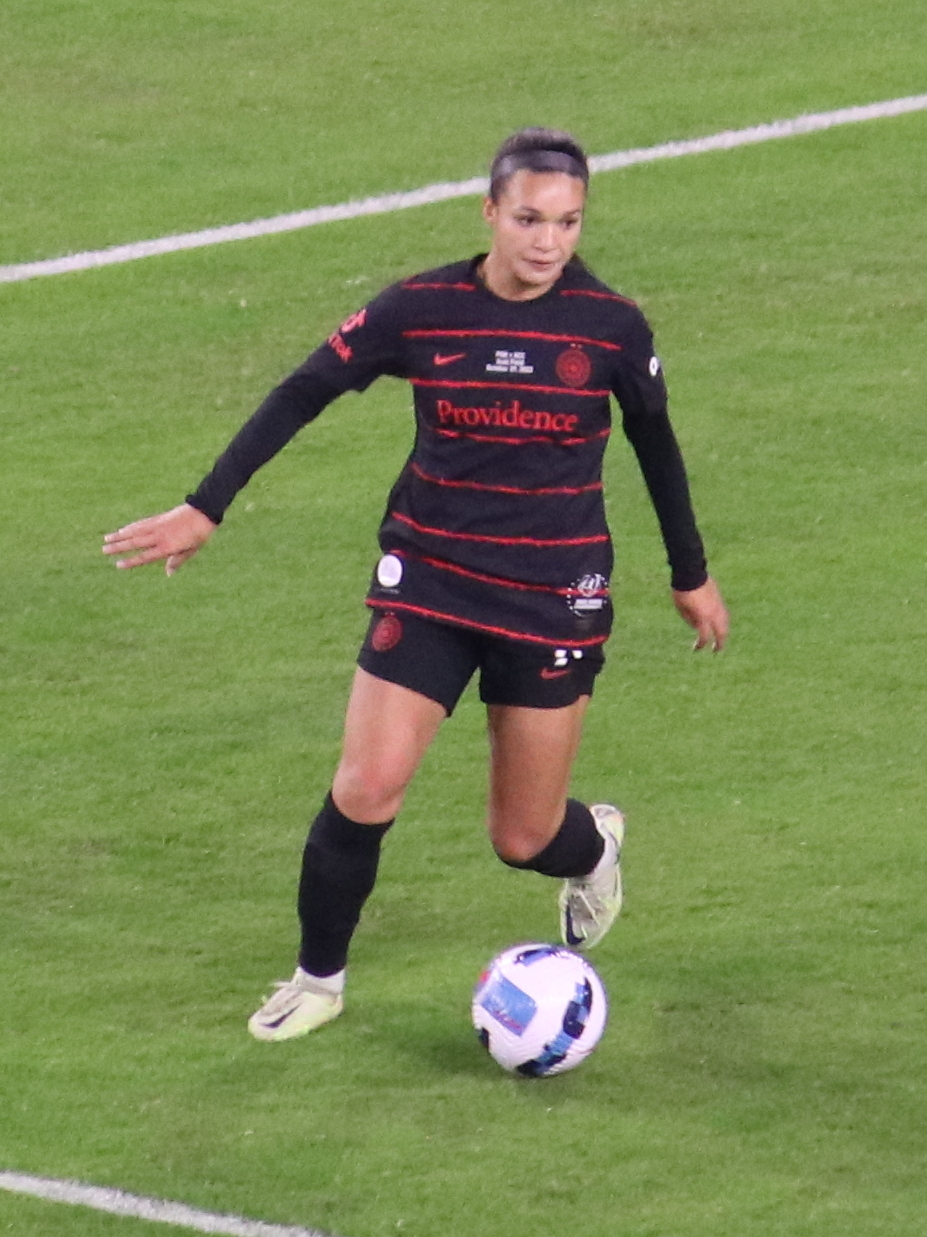
Portland Thorns FC forward Sophia Smith was recognized as the league's Most Valuable Player.

Award	Winner		Nominees	Ref.
Golden Boot	(United States) Alex Morgan (15 G)	San Diego Wave FC	N/A	
Most Valuable Player	(United States) Sophia Smith	Portland Thorns FC	(Brazil) Debinha, NC (United States) Naomi Girma, SD (United States) Alex Morgan, SD (United States) Mallory Pugh, CHI	
Defender of the Year	(United States) Naomi Girma	San Diego Wave FC	(United States) Alana Cook, RGN (United States) Sofia Huerta, RGN (United States) Carson Pickett, NC (United States) Becky Sauerbrunn, POR	
Goalkeeper of the Year	(Canada) Kailen Sheridan	San Diego Wave FC	(United States) Adrianna Franch, KC (United States) Phallon Tullis-Joyce, RGN	
Rookie of the Year	(United States) Naomi Girma	San Diego Wave FC	(United States) Sam Coffey, POR (Mexico) Diana Ordóñez, NC	
Coach of the Year	(England) Casey Stoney	San Diego Wave FC	(England) Laura Harvey, RGN (England) Matt Potter, KC	

==== Teams of the Year ====
Announced October 25, 2022

Best XI

Position	Player	Club
Goalkeeper	(Canada) Kailen Sheridan	San Diego Wave FC
Defender	(United States) Alana Cook	OL Reign
Defender	(United States) Naomi Girma	San Diego Wave FC
Defender	(United States) Sofia Huerta	OL Reign
Defender	(United States) Carson Pickett	North Carolina Courage
Midfielder/Forward	(United States) Sam Coffey	Portland Thorns FC
Midfielder/Forward	(United States) Lo'eau LaBonta	Kansas City Current
Midfielder/Forward	(United States) Alex Morgan	San Diego Wave FC
Midfielder/Forward	(Brazil) Debinha	North Carolina Courage
Midfielder/Forward	(United States) Mallory Pugh	Chicago Red Stars
Midfielder/Forward	(United States) Sophia Smith	Portland Thorns FC

Second XI

Position	Player	Club
Goalkeeper	(United States) Adrianna Franch	Kansas City Current
Defender	(United States) Kelli Hubly	Portland Thorns FC
Defender	(United States) Hailie Mace	Kansas City Current
Defender	(United States) Tatumn Milazzo	Chicago Red Stars
Defender	(United States) Becky Sauerbrunn	Portland Thorns FC
Midfielder/Forward	(Brazil) Kerolin	North Carolina Courage
Midfielder/Forward	(Wales) Jess Fishlock	OL Reign
Midfielder/Forward	(United States) Rose Lavelle	OL Reign
Midfielder/Forward	(Mexico) Diana Ordóñez	North Carolina Courage
Midfielder/Forward	(United States) Megan Rapinoe	OL Reign
Midfielder/Forward	(England) Ebony Salmon	Houston Dash

=== Monthly Awards ===
==== Player of the Month ====
Month	Player	Club	Ref.
May	(United States) Alex Morgan	San Diego Wave FC	
June	(United States) Sophia Smith	Portland Thorns FC	
July	(England) Ebony Salmon	Houston Dash	
August	(United States) Megan Rapinoe	OL Reign	
September/October	(Brazil) Debinha	North Carolina Courage	

==== Rookie of the Month ====
Month	Player	Club	Ref.
May	(United States) Naomi Girma	San Diego Wave FC	
June	(United States) Sam Coffey	Portland Thorns FC	
July	(United States) Savannah DeMelo	Racing Louisville FC	
August	(Mexico) Diana Ordoñez	North Carolina Courage	
September/October	(United States) Naomi Girma (2)	San Diego Wave FC	

==== Team of the Month ====
Month	Goalkeeper	Defenders	Midfielders	Forwards	Ref.
May	(United States) Phallon Tullis-Joyce, RGN	(United States) Alana Cook, RGN (Canada) Vanessa Gilles, LA (United States) Naomi Girma, SD (United States) Sofia Huerta, RGN	(United States) Savannah DeMelo, LOU (United States) Taylor Kornieck, SD (United States) Rose Lavelle, RGN	(England) Rachel Daly, HOU (United States) Alex Morgan, SD (United States) Mallory Pugh, CHI	
June	(United States) Bella Bixby, POR	(United States) Naomi Girma (2), SD (Finland) Natalia Kuikka, POR (United States) Tatumn Milazzo, CHI (United States) Carson Pickett, NC	(United States) Sam Coffey, POR (Brazil) Debinha, NC (United States) Taylor Kornieck (2), SD	(United States) Alex Morgan (2), SD (United States) Mallory Pugh (2), CHI (United States) Sophia Smith, POR	
July	(United States) Adrianna Franch, KC	(United States) Kristen Edmonds, KC (United States) Kelli Hubly, POR (United States) Hailie Mace, KC (United States) Carson Pickett (2), NC	(Wales) Jess Fishlock, RGN (United States) Lo'eau LaBonta, KC (Japan) Hina Sugita, POR	(United States) Bethany Balcer, RGN (England) Ebony Salmon, HOU (United States) Morgan Weaver, POR	
August	(United States) Adrianna Franch (2), KC	(United States) Elizabeth Ball, KC (United States) Naomi Girma (3), SD (United States) Sofia Huerta (2), RGN (United States) Carson Pickett (3), NC	(United States) Meggie Dougherty Howard, ORL (United States) Lo'eau LaBonta (2), KC (United States) Cari Roccaro, LA	(Mexico) Diana Ordoñez, NC (United States) Megan Rapinoe, RGN (England) Ebony Salmon (2), HOU	
September/October	(United States) Katie Lund, LOU	(United States) Alana Cook (2), RGN (United States) Naomi Girma (4), SD (United States) Hailie Mace (2), KC (United States) Carson Pickett (4), NC	(United States) Sam Coffey (2), POR (United States) Vanessa DiBernardo, CHI (United States) Rose Lavelle (2), RGN	(Brazil) Debinha (2), NC (United States) Megan Rapinoe (2), RGN (United States) Sophia Smith (2), POR	

=== Weekly awards ===
Week	Player of the Week		Save of the Week		Ref.
Week	Player	Club	Player	Club	Ref.
1	(Japan) Jun Endo	Angel City FC	(Bosnia and Herzegovina) DiDi Haračić	Angel City FC	
2	(United States) Alex Morgan	San Diego Wave FC	(United States) Phallon Tullis-Joyce	OL Reign	
3	(United States) Christen Press	Angel City FC	(United States) Phallon Tullis-Joyce (2)	OL Reign	
4	(United States) Mallory Pugh	Chicago Red Stars	(Bosnia and Herzegovina) DiDi Haračić (2)	Angel City FC	
5	(United States) Sofia Huerta	OL Reign	(United States) Ashlyn Harris	NJ/NY Gotham FC	
6	(Canada) Nichelle Prince	Houston Dash	(Bosnia and Herzegovina) DiDi Haračić (3)	Angel City FC	
7	(United States) Taylor Kornieck	San Diego Wave FC	(United States) Jane Campbell	Houston Dash	
8	(United States) Alex Morgan (2)	San Diego Wave FC	(United States) Bella Bixby	Portland Thorns FC	
9	(Wales) Jess Fishlock	OL Reign	(United States) Shelby Hogan	Portland Thorns FC	
10	(United States) Adrianna Franch	Kansas City Current	(United States) Adrianna Franch	Kansas City Current	
11	(England) Ebony Salmon	Houston Dash	(United States) Adrianna Franch (2)	Kansas City Current	
12	(United States) Sofia Huerta (2)	OL Reign	(Canada) Kailen Sheridan	San Diego Wave FC	
13	(United States) Sophia Smith	Portland Thorns FC	(United States) Katie Lund	Racing Louisville FC	
14	(France) Claire Lavogez	Kansas City Current	(United States) Michelle Betos	NJ/NY Gotham FC	
15	(United States) Makenzy Doniak	San Diego Wave FC	(United States) Michelle Betos (2)	NJ/NY Gotham FC	
16	(United States) Megan Rapinoe	OL Reign	(United States) Abby Smith	Portland Thorns FC	
17	(United States) Amber Brooks	Washington Spirit	(United States) Paige Monaghan	NJ/NY Gotham FC	
18	(Canada) Kailen Sheridan	San Diego Wave FC	(Canada) Kailen Sheridan (2)	San Diego Wave FC	
19	(Brazil) Debinha	North Carolina Courage	(United States) Bella Bixby (2)	Portland Thorns FC	
