= Hailie Mace =

American soccer player (born 1997)

- Mace with the Kansas City Current in 2025

Personal information
- Full name: Hailie Jenae Mace
- Date of birth: March 24, 1997 (age 29)
- Place of birth: Ventura, California, United States
- Height: 5 ft 7 in (1.70 m)
- Position: Defender

Team information
- Current team: Orlando Pride
- Number: 5

Youth career
- Ventura FC
- Buena High School
- Eagles SC

College career
Years	Team	Apps	(Gls)
2015–2018	UCLA Bruins	79	(24)

Senior career*
Years	Team	Apps	(Gls)
2019	Melbourne City	2	(1)
2019	FC Rosengård	16	(4)
2020–2021	North Carolina Courage	6	(2)
2020	→ Kristianstads DFF (loan)	10	(5)
2021–2025	Kansas City Current	95	(5)
2026–	Orlando Pride	28	(0)

International career^{‡}
2017–2019	United States U23		
2018–	United States	9	(0)
- * Club domestic league appearances and goals as of November 1, 2026 ‡ National team caps and goals as of October 30, 2024

Hailie Jenae Mace (born March 24, 1997) is an American professional soccer player who plays as a defender for the Orlando Pride of the National Women's Soccer League (NWSL) and the United States national team.

Mace played college soccer for the UCLA Bruins, earning first-team All-American honors after helping the team to the 2017 national title game. She was the second overall pick in the 2019 NWSL College Draft but instead began her career with Melbourne City and Rosengård. In 2020, she joined the North Carolina Courage before being traded to the Kansas City Current one year later. She was named to the NWSL Best XI Second Team twice with the Current and helped the club win the NWSL Shield in 2025.

Mace made her senior debut for the United States while in college in 2018.

== Early life ==
Mace was born and raised in Ventura, California, where she attended Buena High School and played soccer as a forward and also played volleyball. She played youth club soccer for Ventura FC, then moved to Eagles SC of the Elite Clubs National League (ECNL) in her senior year of high school.

=== UCLA, 2015–2018 ===
Mace lacked recruitment offers during high school, and drew the attention of the University of California, Los Angeles (UCLA) only after her mother created and sent a highlight tape for them. The tape impressed UCLA coach Amanda Cromwell, who traveled to a tournament in San Diego, California, to scout Mace in person. UCLA then offered Mace a soccer scholarship.

Mace played as a center back during her first two seasons with the UCLA Bruins. In 2015, Mace led all Bruin freshmen in games played at 19. In 2016, she started all 22 games for UCLA and helped the team record 9 shutouts.

In 2017, Mace moved from defense to forward. Playing as an attacker, Mace led the Bruins with four game-winning goals, led the Pac-12 Conference with 13 goals, and once again started every game for the Bruins. UCLA advanced to the 2017 College Cup final, where they would lose 3–2 to rival Stanford. Mace was named a Hermann Trophy semifinalist, first-team All-American, All-West Region, and All-Pac-12.

== Club career ==
=== Melbourne City, 2019 ===
Mace was drafted by Sky Blue FC with the second overall pick in the 2019 NWSL College Draft. However, she did not sign with the team and instead joined Australian club Melbourne City FC on a guest-player contract. In her professional debut, Mace scored twelve minutes after subbing on and helped Melbourne City win 4–0 against the Newcastle Jets.

=== FC Rosengård, 2019 ===
In February 2019, Mace signed a contract with Swedish club FC Rosengård of the Damallsvenskan for the summer with an option to extend to November, and would wear the No. 16 jersey. She debuted for the club on March 8, 2019. In June 2019, FC Rosengård announced that they had extended Mace's contract through the rest of the season to November.

On October 30, 2019, FC Rosengård won the Damallsvenskan.

=== North Carolina Courage, 2020–2021 ===
On January 10, 2020, Mace's NWSL rights were traded to the North Carolina Courage in exchange for McCall Zerboni. She made her debut in the 2020 NWSL Challenge Cup against Portland Thorns FC. Mace had an assist to North Carolina's first goal which was scored by Debinha, and the Courage won the match 2–1.

Mace scored her first NWSL goal on May 28, 2021, against Racing Louisville FC in the 75th minute of play, then scored again in the 89th minute to help North Carolina win 5–0.

=== Kristianstads DFF (loan), 2020 ===
North Carolina loaned Mace to Swedish club Kristianstads DFF from August 2020 to November 2020. Kristianstads finished the season in third place and qualified for the UEFA Women's Champions League.

=== Kansas City Current, 2021–2025 ===
On July 22, 2021, the Courage traded Mace to NWSL club Kansas City NWSL with teammates Kristen Hamilton and Katelyn Rowland, in exchange for Amy Rodriguez and $60,000 in allocation money. She debuted with Kansas City on July 23, 2021, against her former team in the North Carolina Courage. The game ended in a scoreless draw.

Mace scored 4 goals in 18 league games, starting 17, playing primarily at left wing in the 2022 season. After finishing fifth in the league, she played the entirety of the playoffs as the renamed Kansas City Current reached the 2022 NWSL Championship, losing 2–0 to the Portland Thorns. She was named to the NWSL Best XI Second Team at the end of the season. On December 19, 2022, the club announced that they signed Mace to a three-year contract.

Mace played in 23 regular-season games, starting 15, in the 2025 season, covering both right back and center back. She helped the Current win the NWSL Shield with the best record in the league, setting multiple NWSL records including most points, most wins, and fewest goals allowed in a season. In the playoffs, the Current were upset 2–1 by Gotham FC in the quarterfinals. She was named to the NWSL Best XI Second Team for the second time in her career. On November 11, 2025, she announced on Instagram that she would not be re-signing with the Current as a free agent.

=== Orlando Pride, 2026– ===
On December 2, 2025, the Orlando Pride announced that they had signed Mace to a three-year contract. Mace made her Pride debut on March 15, 2026, earning the start in Orlando's season-opening defeat to the Seattle Reign.

== International career ==
=== Youth national teams ===
Mace has participated in U.S. Youth National Team camps with the under-20 and under-23 national teams.

=== Senior national team ===
In February 2018, Mace received her first call-up to the United States women's national team ahead of the 2018 SheBelieves Cup but did not play. The following month, she was called up for two friendlies against Mexico as a replacement for injured defender Casey Short. She earned her first cap on April 8 during the team's 6–2 win over Mexico. In August of the same year, she was named to the roster for two friendlies against Chile. She made her second appearance for the national team on September 1 during the team's 3–0 win over Chile.

In September 2018, Mace was named to the team's 20-player roster for the 2018 CONCACAF Women's Championship, the qualification tournament for the 2019 FIFA Women's World Cup. She was the only college player named to the squad. Mace started and played 90 minutes during the team's 5–0 shutout against Panama on October 17.

During the September 2022 FIFA international window, Mace was called up to replace the injured Kelley O'Hara during two friendlies against Nigeria. She was called up once again in October 2022 for the friendlies against the English and Spanish women's national teams.

== Personal life ==
On October 4, 2026, Mace married Brazilian professional footballer Rafaelle Souza.

== Career statistics ==
=== International ===
As of October 24, 2024

National team	Year	Apps	Goals
United States
United States	2018	3	0
United States	2019	–	–
United States	2020	–	–
United States	2021	–	–
United States	2022	5	0
United States	2023	–	–
United States	2024	1	0
Total		9	0

== Honors ==
Rosengård

- Damallsvenskan: 2019

Kansas City Current

- NWSL Shield: 2025
- NWSL x Liga MX Femenil Summer Cup: 2024

United States

- CONCACAF Women's Championship: 2018

Individual

- NWSL Best XI Second Team: 2022, 2025
