= Taylor Leach =

American soccer player

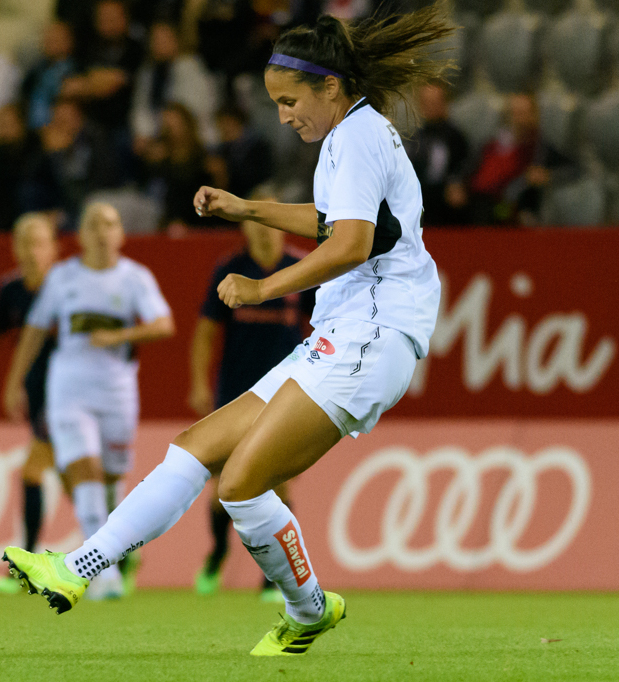
- Leach in 2019

Personal information
- Full name: Taylor Maree Leach
- Date of birth: January 19, 1992 (age 34)
- Place of birth: Toledo, Ohio, United States
- Height: 5 ft 10 in (1.78 m)
- Position: Defender

Youth career
- –2010: Cleveland Internationals

College career
Years	Team	Apps	(Gls)
2010–2014	South Carolina Gamecocks	86	(6)

Senior career*
Years	Team	Apps	(Gls)
2016	Sunnanå SK	13	(2)
2017	Östersunds DFF	14	(2)
2017–2019	BK Häcken	53	(4)
2020	Utah Royals	2	(0)
2021–2022	Kansas City Current	34	(1)

Managerial career
- 2015: South Carolina Gameocks (assistant)
- 2024–2025: South Carolina Gameocks (assistant)
- 2025–: Lexington SC (assistant)
- * Club domestic league appearances and goals as of 17 October 2020

Taylor Maree Leach (born January 19, 1992) is an American former professional soccer player who last played as a defender for Kansas City Current in the National Women's Soccer League (NWSL). She is currently an assistant coach for USL Super League club Lexington SC.

== Club career ==
Leach played for Swedish club Kopparbergs/Göteborg FC.

Leach made her NWSL debut in the 2020 NWSL Challenge Cup on July 8, 2020, for Utah Royals FC. She later played for Kansas City Current and retired after the 2022 NWSL season.

== Coaching ==
After graduation, Leach briefly served as a volunteer assistant coach for her alma, the South Carolina Gameocks. She returned to South Carolina after the conclusion of her playing career. In September 2025, Leach joined Masaki Hemmi's staff at Lexington SC in the USL Super League.
