= Alex Loera =

American soccer player (born 1999)

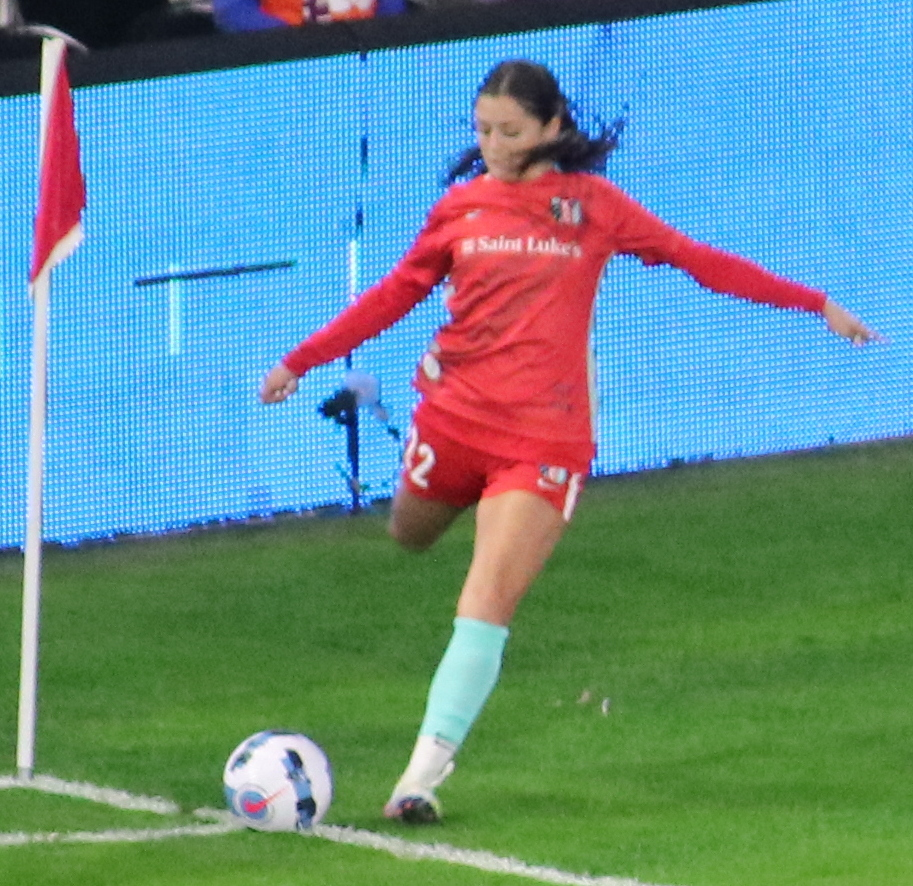
- Loera with the Kansas City Current in 2022

Personal information
- Full name: Alexis Alycia Loera
- Date of birth: June 19, 1999 (age 27)
- Place of birth: Thornton, Colorado, United States
- Height: 5 ft 7 in (1.70 m)
- Position: Defender

Team information
- Current team: Utah Royals
- Number: 12

Youth career
- Colorado Storm
- The Academy

College career
Years	Team	Apps	(Gls)
2017–2021	Santa Clara Broncos	98	(7)

Senior career*
Years	Team	Apps	(Gls)
2022–2023	Kansas City Current	30	(0)
2024	Bay FC	4	(1)
2025–	Utah Royals	0	(0)

International career^{‡}
- United States U17
2022	United States U23		
- * Club domestic league appearances and goals as of November 30, 2024 ‡ National team caps and goals as of April 6, 2023

Alexis Alycia Loera (born June 19, 1999) is an American professional soccer player who plays as a defender or as a midfielder for the Utah Royals of the National Women's Soccer League (NWSL).

== Youth career ==
Loera grew up in Thornton, Colorado, and began playing soccer among other sports when she was three years old. She eventually selected soccer over playing softball. She played high school soccer for The Academy of Charter Schools in Westminster, Colorado, and also played for Colorado Storm of the Elite Clubs National League.

== College career ==
Loera played NCAA Division I women's soccer for the Santa Clara Broncos. Loera was a captain for the Broncos team that won the 2020 NCAA Division I women's soccer tournament, resulting in Santa Clara's second national championship. Loera was also named the tournament's Most Outstanding Defensive player.

== Club career ==
Expansion team Kansas City NWSL selected Loera with the 36th-overall pick in the 2021 NWSL Draft, though she opted to return to Santa Clara for an additional year of eligibility due to the COVID-19 pandemic. She joined the then-renamed Current in 2022.

=== Kansas City Current, 2022–2023 ===
On March 18, 2022, Loera made her professional debut for Kansas City as a starter in a 1–1 Challenge Cup draw against Racing Louisville FC. She scored her first professional goal on April 24, 2022, against Chicago Red Stars in a 2–1 Challenge Cup victory, and the goal was featured on SportsCenter as a Top 10 play.

In the 2022 NWSL Playoffs semifinal match against OL Reign, Loera—moving from the backline to defensive midfield in place of suspended Desiree Scott—scored the fastest goal in NWSL Playoffs history with a 4th-minute tally. The goal was Loera's first in the regular season or postseason, and was also the eventual match-winner as Kansas City won 2–0 and advanced to the NWSL Championship match. Kansas City fell in the championship to Portland Thorns FC by a final score of 0–2; Loera started and played the full 90 minutes.

On January 5, 2023, Kansas City Current announced that it had re-signed Loera to a three-year contract through the 2025 season.

=== Bay FC, 2023–2024 ===
On November 15, 2023, the Current traded Loera to NWSL expansion team Bay FC in exchange for $175,000 in allocation money and immunity in the 2024 NWSL Expansion Draft. The transaction made Loera the first player signed in Bay FC's history.

=== Utah Royals, 2025– ===
On December 19, 2024, Loera joined Utah Royals from Bay for $25,000 in intra-league transfer fees and a 15% sell-on fee. The contract will keep her in Utah through the 2027 season. Loera made her first appearance for Utah on Friday May 9, 2025 in their match against Angel City FC, returning from an ACL tear injury. On May 21, 2025, Loera announced that she had sustained another ACL tear.

== International career ==
Loera was called into camps for the United States under-17 and under-23 national soccer teams.

== Personal life ==
She is a Christian. She announced that she got engaged on July 3, 2026 and got married August 3, 2026

== Honors ==
Santa Clara Broncos

- NCAA Division I Women's Soccer Championship: 2020
