= Matt Potter =

English football manager

Personal information
- Full name: Matthew James Potter
- Date of birth: 23 January 1970 (age 56)
- Place of birth: Mere, England
- Position: Central midfielder

Youth career
- Watford

Senior career*
Years	Team	Apps	(Gls)
- Watford

International career
- England U19

Managerial career
- 1995–2003: Sereno Soccer Club
- 2002–2003: Scottsdale Fighting Artichokes
- 2003: Washington State Cougars (assistant)
- 2003–2011: Washington State Cougars
- 2011–2019: Oklahoma Sooners
- 2020–2022: United States U23
- 2022–2023: Kansas City Current
- * Club domestic league appearances and goals

Matthew James Potter (born 23 January 1970) is an English former footballer and current sporting director of Bay FC in the National Women's Soccer League.

== Playing career ==
From age 14 to 19 Potter was at Watford, where he played professionally as a central midfielder. He also played for the England under-19 national team. While at Brunel University London, he helped lead the team to a national college title in 1991.

== Managerial career ==
In 1992, Potter moved to Long Island and joined Noga Soccer, where he coached, developed a curriculum and coordinated clinics and camps. From 1995 to 2003, he worked as a head coach and trainer at Sereno Soccer Club in Phoenix, Arizona. From 1998 he also worked on the coaching staff for the Regional IV (West) of the United States Youth Soccer Association Olympic Development Program. He was the head coach of the Scottsdale Community College women's team for one season in 2002, leading them to the ACCAC play-offs with a winning record.

As of 2022, Potter held a USSF Pro, USSF Talent Scout, USSF "A" and United Soccer Coaches Premier licenses.

=== NCAA Division I ===
In February 2003, Potter was named as the assistant coach for the Washington State Cougars women's team. However, prior to the start of the season, he was promoted to head coach in July 2003, taking over from Dan Tobias who left for the Arizona Wildcats. He coached the team for nine seasons, including three seasons with an appearance in the NCAA Division I Women's Soccer Championship (2008, 2009 and 2011). In December 2011, Potter became the head coach of the Oklahoma Sooners women's program, where he remained for eight seasons. Twice the team qualified for the NCAA Division I Women's Soccer Championship, in 2014 and 2016. In November 2019, it was announced that Potter would leave Oklahoma at the end of the season.

=== United States women's national under-23 soccer team, 2020–2022 ===
In January 2020, the United States Soccer Federation hired Potter as the head coach of the under-23 women's national team. He previously had served as an opponent scout for the U.S. women's program, including at the 2019 FIFA Women's World Cup in France.

=== Kansas City Current, 2022–2023 ===
On 11 January 2022, Potter was announced as the head coach of Kansas City Current in the National Women's Soccer League. The 2022 Current went unbeaten for 13 consecutive matches during the season, finished with a 10–6–6 record, and reached the NWSL Playoffs finals before losing to Portland Thorns FC in the championship match. Potter was a finalist for the league's coach of the year award.

On 19 April 2023, Kansas City fired Potter, citing in a statement "issues around his leadership and employment responsibilities". The firing occurred three matches into the season, all losses, and occurred hours before the Current were to play Houston Dash in the 2023 NWSL Challenge Cup.

=== Bay FC ===
On December 12, 2023, Potter was announced as Technical Director of expansion side Bay FC in the NWSL. After the resignation of Bay FC General Manager Lucy Rushton, Potter took on the interim role of sporting director.

== Personal life ==
Potter is a native of Mere, and graduated from West London College of Brunel University London in 1992 with an honors degree in physical education and religious, social and moral education. He is married to Olga and has one daughter and three stepdaughters.
