= Debinha =

Brazilian footballer (born 1991)

- Debinha with the Kansas City Current in 2026

Personal information
- Full name: Débora Cristiane de Oliveira
- Date of birth: 20 October 1991 (age 35)
- Place of birth: Brasópolis, Minas Gerais, Brazil
- Height: 1.57 m (5 ft 2 in)
- Positions: Forward; midfielder; winger

Team information
- Current team: Kansas City Current
- Number: 99

Senior career*
Years	Team	Apps	(Gls)
2006–2007	Lorena		
2008–	Saad Esporte Clube		
2010	Portuguesa		
2011	Foz Cataratas		
2011–2013	Centro Olímpico		
2013–2015	Avaldsnes IL	30	(23)
2014	→ São José (loan)		
2016	Dalian Quanjian		
2017–2022	North Carolina Courage	115	(42)
2023–	Kansas City Current	86	(28)

International career^{‡}
2010	Brazil U-20	3	(1)
2011–	Brazil	136	(59)
- * Club domestic league appearances and goals as of 16:47, 14 November 2026 (UTC) ‡ National team caps and goals as of 29 July 2023

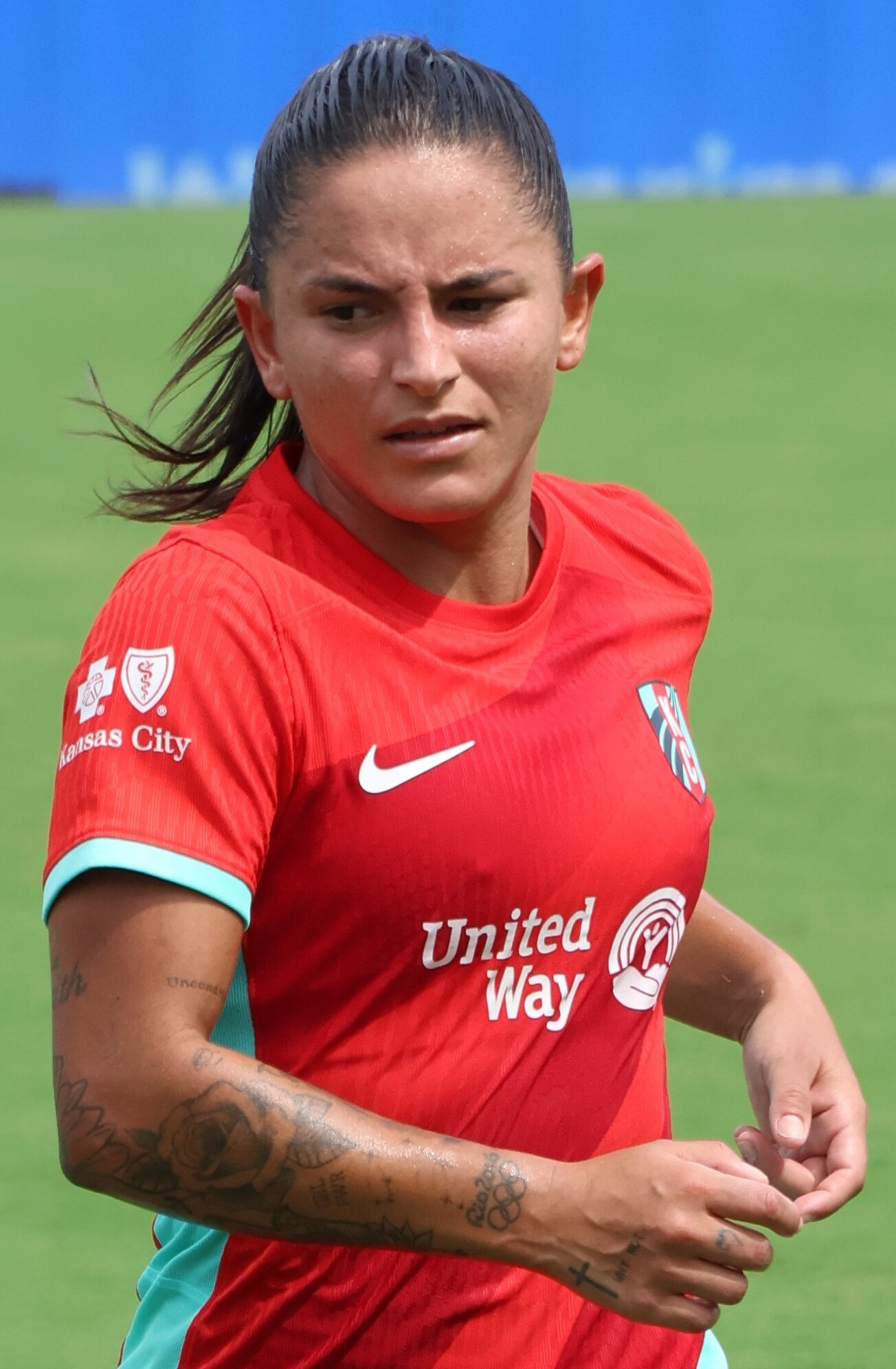
Debinha with the Kansas City Current in 2024

Débora Cristiane de Oliveira (born 20 October 1991), known as Debinha Miri or simply Debinha, is a Brazilian professional footballer who plays as a midfielder or forward for the Kansas City Current of the National Women's Soccer League (NWSL) and the Brazil national team.

Debinha began her career in Brazil before playing overseas in Norway and China. In 2017, she joined the North Carolina Courage, where she won three NWSL Shields, two NWSL Championships, and one NWSL Challenge Cup. She was named MVP of the 2019 championship game and twice named MVP of the Challenge Cup. After six seasons in North Carolina, she signed with the Current as a free agent in 2023. She helped Kansas City win the NWSL Shield in 2025 and the NWSL Championship in 2026.

Debinha made her senior debut for Brazil in 2011. She was included on her country's squads at the 2016 Olympics, 2019 World Cup, 2020 Olympics, and 2023 World Cup.

== Club career ==
=== Early career (2013–2016) ===
When Rosana transferred to Avaldsnes in August 2013, she asked the Norwegian club to sign Debinha too. Debinha became top-scorer of the 2014 Toppserien.

At the end of 2014, she had a short loan spell between November and December together with Rosana at São José during the club's successful attempt to win both Copa Libertadores Femenina and International Women's Club Championship during that year. She returned to Norway at the beginning of 2015.

From February 2016 to January 2017, she played for Dalian Quanjian in the Chinese Women's Super League.

=== North Carolina Courage (2017–2022) ===
Debinha signed with the Western New York Flash of the United States–based National Women's Soccer League on 5 January 2017, days before the franchise announced that it had been sold and would be moved from Rochester, New York, to Cary, North Carolina. Debinha reportedly wasn't informed of the franchise's plans to move when she was signed. She reported to North Carolina and was made a starting midfielder from the start of their season, and scored the Courage's first goal in their home stadium.

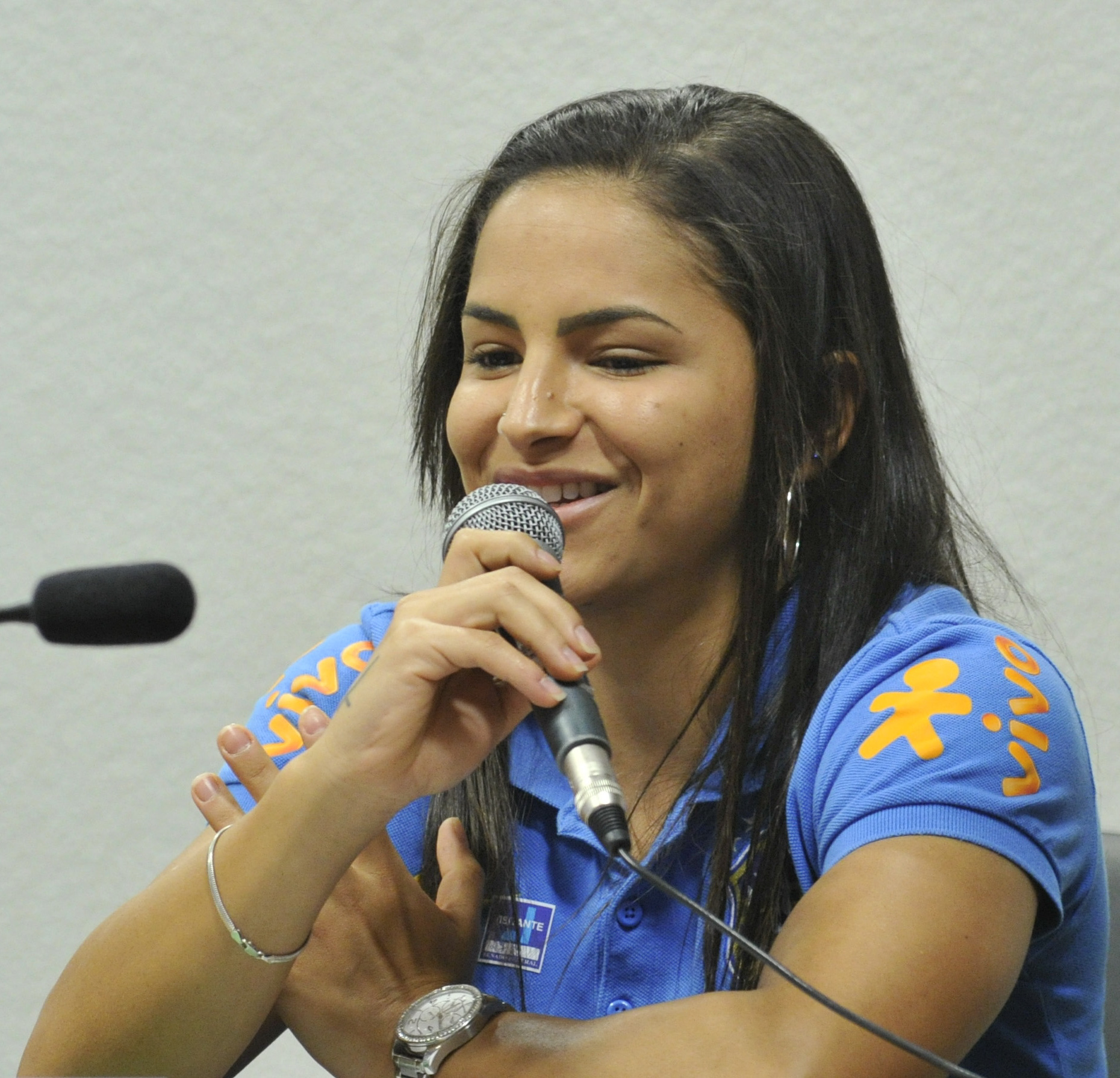
Debinha in 2015

Debinha appeared in every regular season game for the Courage in 2017 and scored four goals. She started the semi-final game against the Chicago Red Stars but was forced to leave the game after dislocating her elbow in the 10th minute. This injury forced her to miss the Championship game, which the Courage lost 1–0 to the Portland Thorns.

In 2018, Debinha was named to the NWSL Team of the Month for March. She scored eight goals during the regular season, helping the Courage win their second straight NWSL Shield. Debinha was named to the 2018 NWSL Second XI. During the playoffs, she was in the starting line-up for the semi-final and final. Debinha scored in the 13th minute of the Championship game as North Carolina beat the Portland Thorns 3–0 to win the 2018 NWSL Championship.

During the 2019 season, Debinha played 21 games throughout the regular season and playoffs. During this span, she scored ten goals (eight regular season and two postseason) and tallied seven assists. She was named to the NWSL Team of the Month for July, August, and September. During the first round of the playoffs, Debinha scored the game-winning goal in extra time to help The Courage advance past Reign FC. In the final, Debinha scored the first goal (and eventual game winner) against the Chicago Red Stars, with her performance earning her the Championship Game MVP Award.

She scored a tournament-high three goals in four games of the 2021 NWSL Challenge Cup and was named the tournament's MVP, though the Courage placed second to NJ/NY Gotham FC in their division. She scored in five games in a row during the 2022 NWSL Challenge Cup, including the opening goal in a 2–1 win against the Kansas City Current in the semifinals. She assisted Kerolin for first goal of the final, a 2–1 victory over the Washington Spirit. She was named the MVP of the tournament for a second time. She scored a team-high 12 goals in the 2022 regular season, good for third in the league, and was named to the NWSL Best XI. She left the Courage at the end of the year.

=== Kansas City Current (2023–present) ===
In January 2023, it was announced that she had signed a two-year contract with the Kansas City Current. She made her club debut off the bench against the Portland Thorns on 1 April 2023. She scored a club-record 9 goals in her first season with the Current, being named to the NWSL Team of the Month three times and the NWSL Best XI at the end of the season.

On 10 November 2025, it was announced that Debinha was one of five finalists for the NWSL Midfielder of the Year award, along with midfield teammate Claire Hutton. Players from the Current made up one-third of all NWSL award nominees.

On 29 July 2026, Debinha scored twice in a 5–1 win over Racing Louisville, equaling Lynn Biyendolo as the NWSL's all-time top scorer with 82 goals in all competitions (including 58 in the regular season, sixth all-time). On 21 November 2026, she put the Current up 2–0 in added time of the 2026 NWSL Championship, helping the Current win their first NWSL title after a 2–1 victory over the Washington Spirit.

== International career ==
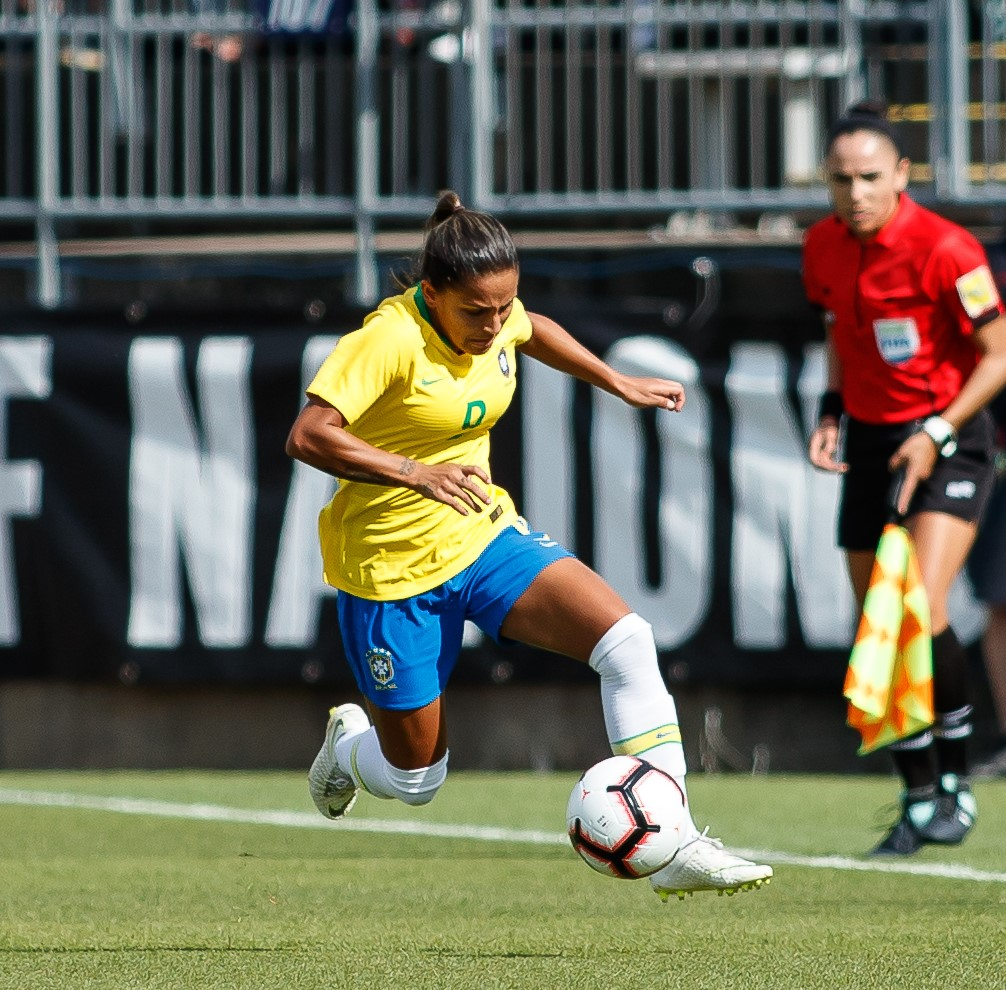
Debinha playing for Brazil in 2018

After representing Brazil in the 2010 FIFA U-20 Women's World Cup, Debinha made her senior debut on 18 October 2011 in a 2–0 win over Argentina at the 2011 Pan American Games in Guadalajara. She was named as an alternate for the Brazil squad at the 2012 London Olympics.

In December 2013, Debinha scored twice in a 3–1 win over Scotland at the 2013 International Women's Football Tournament of Brasília.

She also represented Brazil at the 2016 and 2020 editions of the Olympic Games.

Debinha was one of four NWSL players called up to represent Brazil in the 2019 FIFA Women's World Cup held in France.

On 18 February 2021, Debinha played her 100th match for Brazil in a 4–1 win over Argentina in the 2021 SheBelieves Cup.

Debinha continued to represent Brazil in the 2023 FIFA Women's World Cup held in Australia and New Zealand. Debinha scored in Brazil's group stage match against France.

== Career statistics ==
=== International goals ===
Scores and results list Brazil's goal tally first, score column indicates score after each Debinha goal.

List of international goals scored by Debinha
No.	Date	Venue	Opponent	Score	Result	Competition	Ref.
1	20 October 2011	Guadalajara, Mexico	Costa Rica	1–0	2–1	Pan American Games 2011	
2	27 October 2011	Guadalajara, Mexico	Canada	1–0	1–1	Pan American Games 2011	
3	16 December 2012	São Paulo, Brazil	Denmark	2–0	2–1	International Tournament 2012	
4	25 September 2013	Savièse, Switzerland	Mexico	2–0	4–0	Valais Cup 2013	
5	25 September 2013	Savièse, Switzerland	Mexico	3–0	4–0	Valais Cup 2013	
6	15 December 2013	Brasília, Brazil	Scotland	2–0	3–1	International Tournament 2013	
7	15 December 2013	Brasília, Brazil	Scotland	3–0	3–1	International Tournament 2013	
8	22 December 2013	Brasília, Brazil	Chile	5–0	5–0	International Tournament 2013	
9	6 April 2014	Brisbane, Australia	Australia	1–0	1–0	Friendly game	
10	10 December 2014	Brasília, Brazil	Argentina	1–0	4–0	International Tournament 2014	
11	18 December 2014	Brasília, Brazil	China	3–0	4–1	International Tournament 2014	
12	1 December 2015	Cuiabá, Brazil	New Zealand	5–1	5–1	Friendly game	
13	9 December 2015	Natal, Brazil	Trinidad and Tobago	5–0	11–0	International Tournament 2015	
14	13 December 2015	Natal, Brazil	Mexico	3–0	6–0	International Tournament 2015	
15	16 December 2015	Natal, Brazil	Canada	2–0	2–1	International Tournament 2015	
16	2 March 2016	Lagos, Portugal	New Zealand	1–0	1–0	2016 Algarve Cup	
17	23 July 2016	Fortaleza, Brazil	Australia	1–1	3–1	Friendly game	
18	11 December 2016	Manaus, Brazil	Russia	2–0	4–0	International Tournament 2016	
19	11 December 2016	Manaus, Brazil	Russia	4–0	4–0	International Tournament 2016	
20	14 December 2016	Manaus, Brazil	Italy	3–1	3–1	International Tournament 2016	
21	18 December 2016	Manaus, Brazil	Italy	5–3	5–3	International Tournament 2016	
22	16 September 2017	Penrith, Australia	Australia	1–2	1–2	Friendly game	
23	28 November 2017	La Serena, Chile	Chile	3–0	3–0	Friendly game	
24	5 April 2018	Coquimbo, Chile	Argentina	3–1	3–1	Copa América 2018	
25	7 April 2018	Coquimbo, Chile	Ecuador	7–0	8–0	Copa América 2018	
26	19 April 2018	La Serena, Chile	Argentina	3–0	3–0	Copa América 2018	
27	26 July 2018	Kansas City, United States	Australia	1–3	1–3	2018 Tournament of Nations	
28	2 March 2019	Nashville, Tennessee, United States	Japan	1–3	1–3	2019 SheBelieves Cup	
29	29 August 2019	São Paulo, Brazil	Argentina	3–0	5–0	International Tournament 2019	
30	5 October 2019	Middlesbrough, England	England	1–0	2–1	Friendly game	
31	5 October 2019	Middlesbrough, England	England	2–0	2–1	Friendly game	
32	8 October 2019	Kielce, Poland	Poland	1–1	3–1	Friendly game	
33	12 December 2019	São Paulo, Brazil	Mexico	2–0	6–0	Friendly game	
34	15 December 2019	Araraquara, Brazil	Mexico	2–0	4–0	Friendly game	
35	27 November 2020	São Paulo, Brazil	Ecuador	1–0	6–0	Friendly game	
36	27 November 2020	São Paulo, Brazil	Ecuador	2–0	6–0	Friendly game	
37	27 November 2020	São Paulo, Brazil	Ecuador	5–0	6–0	Friendly game	
38	1 December 2020	São Paulo, Brazil	Ecuador	1–0	8–0	Friendly game	
39	18 December 2021	Orlando, Florida, United States	Argentina	2–0	4–0	2021 SheBelieves Cup	
40	24 February 2021	Orlando, Florida, United States	Canada	1–0	2–0	2021 SheBelieves Cup	
41	21 July 2021	Rifu, Japan	China	2–0	5–0	2020 Summer Olympics	
42	24 July 2021	Rifu, Japan	Netherlands	1–1	3–3	2020 Summer Olympics	
43	17 September 2021	Campina Grande, Brazil	Argentina	1–0	3–1	Friendly game	
44	20 September 2021	Joáo Pessoa, Brazil	Argentina	3–0	4–1	Friendly game	
45	26 October 2021	Sydney, Australia	Australia	2–2	2–2	Friendly game	
46	26 November 2021	Manaus, Brazil	India	1–0	6–1	2021 International Women's Football Tournament of Manaus	
47	28 November 2021	Manaus, Brazil	Venezuela	4–1	4–1	2021 International Women's Football Tournament of Manaus	
48	24 June 2022	Copenhagen, Denmark	Denmark	1–1	1–2	Friendly game	
49	28 June 2022	Stockholm, Sweden	Sweden	1–0	1–3	Friendly game	
50	9 July 2022	Armenia, Colombia	Argentina	4–0	4–0	2022 Copa America Femenina	
51	12 July 2022	Armenia, Colombia	Uruguay	2–0	3–0	2022 Copa America Femenina	
52	18 July 2022	Armenia, Colombia	Venezuela	3–0	4–0	2022 Copa America Femenina	
53	18 July 2022	Armenia, Colombia	Venezuela	4–0	4–0	2022 Copa America Femenina	
54	30 July 2022	Bucaramanga, Colombia	Colombia	1–0	1–0	2022 Copa America Femenina	
55	5 September 2022	Durban, South Africa	South Africa	2–0	6–0	Friendly game	
56	5 September 2022	Durban, South Africa	South Africa	6–0	6–0	Friendly game	
57	11 November 2022	Santos, Brazil	Canada	1–2	1–2	Friendly game	
58	16 February 2023	Orlando, Florida, United States	Japan	1–0	1–0	2023 SheBelieves Cup	
59	29 July 2023	Brisbane, Australia	France	1–2	1–2	2023 FIFA Women's World Cup	
60	28 October 2023	Montréal, Canada	Canada	1–0	1–0	Friendly game	
61	22 February 2024	San Diego, United States	Panama	4–0	5–0	2024 CONCACAF W Gold Cup	

== Honours ==
North Carolina Courage

- NWSL Championship: 2018, 2019
- NWSL Shield: 2017, 2018, 2019
- NWSL Challenge Cup: 2022

Kansas City Current

- NWSL Championship: 2026
- NWSL Shield: 2025
- NWSL x Liga MX Femenil Summer Cup: 2024

Brazil

- Copa América Femenina: 2018, 2022

Individual

- NWSL Best XI: 2022, 2023
- NWSL Second XI: 2018
- NWSL Championship Most Valuable Player: 2019
- NWSL Challenge Cup MVP: 2021, 2022
- NWSL Challenge Cup top scorer: 2021
- IFFHS CONMEBOL Woman Team of the Decade 2011–2020

== See also ==
- List of women's footballers with 100 or more international caps
