= 2024 CONCACAF W Gold Cup final =

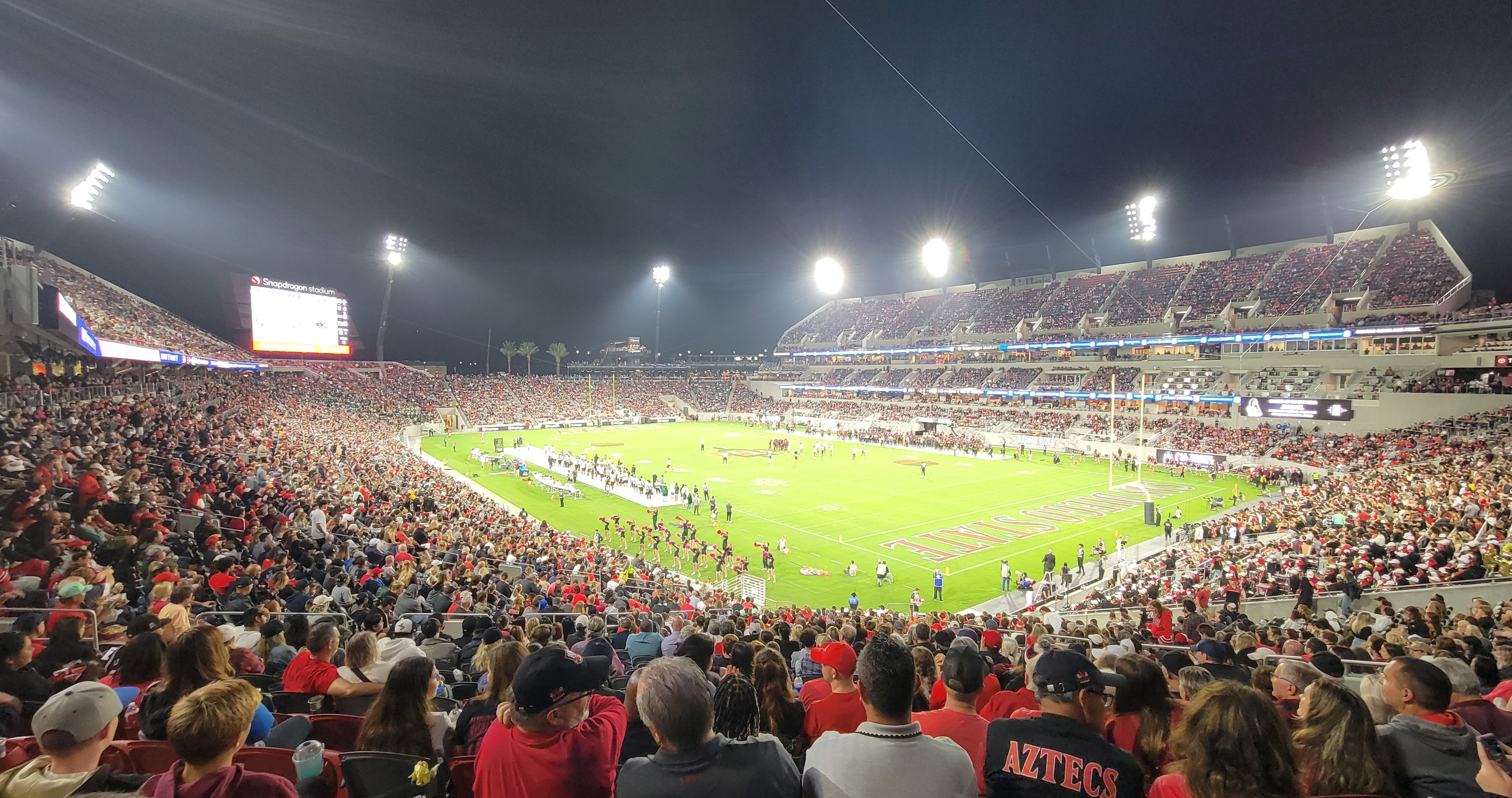
- Snapdragon Stadium hosted the final
- Event: 2024 CONCACAF W Gold Cup
United States	Brazil
(United States)	(Brazil)
1	0
- Date: March 10, 2024
- Venue: Snapdragon Stadium, San Diego, California
- Referee: Melissa Borjas (Honduras)
- Attendance: 31,528

The 2024 CONCACAF W Gold Cup final was a soccer match to determine the winner of the 2024 CONCACAF W Gold Cup. The match was the first final of the CONCACAF W Gold Cup, a biennial tournament contested by the women's national teams representing the member associations of CONCACAF and invited guests to decide the champion of North America, Central America, and the Caribbean. The match was played at Snapdragon Stadium in San Diego, California, United States, on March 10, 2024.

The United States won the inaugural title by defeating Brazil 1–0. The lone goal of the match was scored in first half stoppage time by captain Lindsey Horan.

== Route to the final ==
United States		Round	Brazil	
Opponent	Result	Group stage	Opponent	Result
Dominican Republic	5–0	Match 1	Puerto Rico	1–0
Argentina	4–0	Match 2	Colombia	1–0
Mexico	0–2	Match 3	Panama	5–0
Group A runners-up: Pos / Team / Pld / Pts; 1 / Mexico / 3 / 7; 2 / United States (H) / 3 / 6; 3 / Argentina / 3 / 4; 4 / Dominican Republic / 3 / 0; Source: CONCACAF (H) Hosts		Final standings	Group B winners: Pos / Team / Pld / Pts; 1 / Brazil / 3 / 9; 2 / Colombia / 3 / 6; 3 / Puerto Rico / 3 / 3; 4 / Panama / 3 / 0; Source: CONCACAF	
Opponent	Result	Knockout stage	Opponent	Result
Colombia	3–0	Quarter-finals	Argentina	5–1
Canada	2–2 (3–1 p)	Semi-finals	Mexico	3–0

=== United States ===
The United States qualified for the 2024 CONCACAF W Gold Cup by winning the 2022 CONCACAF W Championship and hosted the tournament. They were placed in Group A along with Argentina and Mexico, as well as the winner from the qualification playoff between Dominican Republic and Guyana, which was later confirmed as Dominican Republic. The team is managed by Twila Kilgore, who is acting as an interim coach, following Vlatko Andonovski's resignment.

The United States opened the group stage by easily beating Dominican Republic 5–0, with Olivia Moultrie scoring a brace in her first international start. In their second match, they beat Argentina 4–0, securing their place in the knockout stage. In the last group match, the Americans suffered a shock 2–0 loss to Mexico who pipped them to the top spot.

United States responded to the loss by dominating Colombia in the quarterfinal, beating them 3–0, with goalkeeper Alyssa Naeher recording a clean sheet in her 100th senior international appearance. In the semifinal, the Americans faced their neighbor from the north, Canada. The game ended 1–1 at the end of regular time and each team scored another goal in extra time to reach a 2–2 result. In the penalty shoot-out the United States won 3–1, with Naeher making three saves and converting a goal, advancing to the final.

=== Brazil ===
Brazil were invited to the 2024 CONCACAF W Gold Cup as one of the top four teams placing in the 2022 Copa América Femenina. They were placed in Group B along with Colombia and Panama, as well as the winner from the qualification playoff between Puerto Rico and Haiti, which was later confirmed as Puerto Rico. The team is managed by Arthur Elias.

Brazil opened the group stage by scraping past Puerto Rico 1–0 with their goal scored in the 81st minute. In their second match, they narrowly beat Colombia with an early goal setting a 1–0 scoreline. The Brazilians finished the group by recording a third win, this time easily beating Panama 5–0 and advancing to the knockout stage as group winners.

In the knockout stage, Brazil continued their high scoring, thrashing Argentina 5–1 in the quarterfinal. In the semifinal, they had another easy win, beating Mexico 3–0 and advancing to the final.

== Match ==
=== Details ===
March 10, 2024
20:15 (17:15 UTC−8)

United States	1–0	Brazil
Horan 45+1'	Report

Snapdragon Stadium, San Diego, California
Attendance: 31,528
Referee: Melissa Borjas (Honduras)

GK	1	Alyssa Naeher
RB	23	Emily Fox
CB	4	Naomi Girma
CB	12	Tierna Davidson
LB	19	Crystal Dunn	(substituted off) 86'
CM	17	Sam Coffey	(substituted off) 71'
CM	15	Korbin Albert
CM	10	Lindsey Horan
RW	22	Trinity Rodman	(substituted off) 71'
LW	16	Rose Lavelle	(substituted off) 46'
CF	7	Alex Morgan	(yellow card) 55' (substituted off) 59'
Substitutions:
FW	6	Lynn Williams	(substituted on) 46'
FW	11	Sophia Smith	(substituted on) 59'
FW	8	Jaedyn Shaw	(substituted on) 71'
FW	9	Midge Purce	(substituted on) 71'
DF	20	Casey Krueger	(substituted on) 86'
Manager:
Twila Kilgore

GK	1	Luciana
CB	2	Antônia
CB	3	Tarciane
CB	5	Thaís
RM	11	Adriana
CM	21	Duda Santos	(substituted off) 57'
CM	20	Duda Sampaio	(substituted off) 80'
LM	6	Yasmim
RW	18	Gabi Portilho
LW	10	Bia Zaneratto	(substituted off) 79'
CF	9	Gabi Nunes	(substituted off) 65'
Substitutions:
MF	16	Vitória Yaya	(substituted on) 57'
FW	19	Geyse	(substituted on) 65'
FW	7	Debinha	(substituted on) 79'
MF	15	Julia Bianchi	(substituted on) 80'
Manager:
Arthur Elias
