= Casey Krueger =

American soccer player (born 1990)

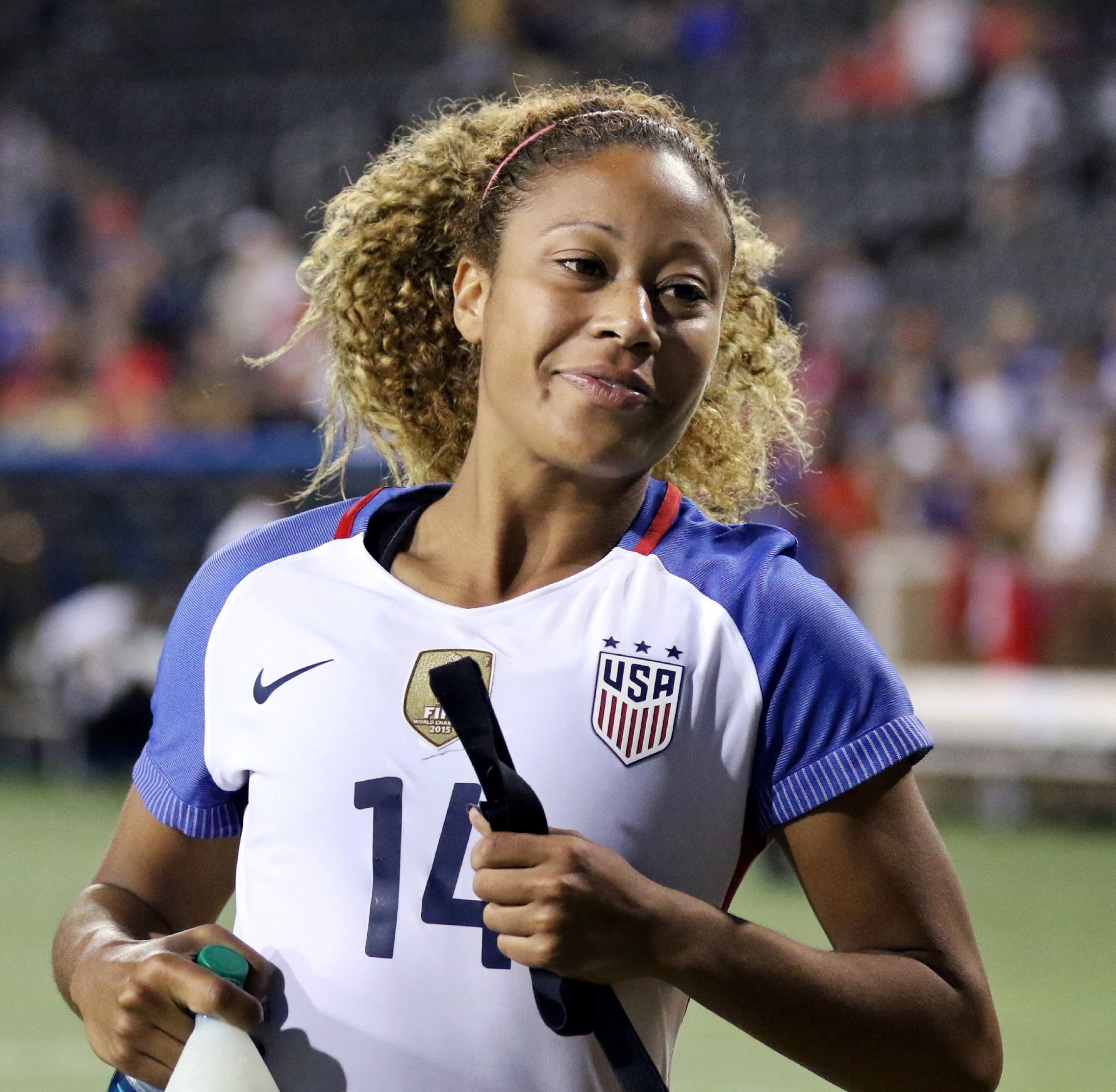
- Krueger with the United States in 2017

Personal information
- Full name: Casey Marie Krueger
- Birth name: Casey Marie Short
- Date of birth: August 23, 1990 (age 36)
- Place of birth: Naperville, Illinois, United States
- Height: 5 ft 8 in (1.73 m)
- Position: Left back

Team information
- Current team: Washington Spirit
- Number: 3

College career
Years	Team	Apps	(Gls)
2008–2012	Florida State Seminoles	81	(7)

Senior career*
Years	Team	Apps	(Gls)
2013	Boston Breakers	0	(0)
2014	Chicago Red Stars	0	(0)
2015	Avaldsnes IL	27	(0)
2016–2023	Chicago Red Stars	110	(7)
2024–	Washington Spirit	31	(2)

International career^{‡}
2010	United States U20		
2013	United States U23		
2016–	United States	60	(0)
Medal record
Women's soccer
Representing the United States
Olympic Games
Gold medal – first place	2024 Paris	Team
Bronze medal – third place	2020 Tokyo	Team
CONCACAF W Gold Cup
Winner	2024 United States
CONCACAF W Championship
Winner	2018 United States
- * Club domestic league appearances and goals as of October 19, 2025 ‡ National team caps and goals as of November 30, 2024

Casey Marie Krueger (/ˈkruːɡər/ KROO-ghər; née Short; born August 23, 1990) is an American professional soccer player who plays as a left back for the Washington Spirit of the National Women's Soccer League (NWSL) and the United States national team.

Krueger played collegiate soccer for the Florida State Seminoles and was the fifth overall pick in the 2013 NWSL College Draft. She was named to two NWSL Best XI and one Second XI during her eight seasons with the Chicago Red Stars.

Krueger made her senior international debut for the United States in 2016. She has won two Olympic medals with the team, bronze at the Tokyo 2020 and gold at Paris 2024.

== Early life and education ==
Raised in the Chicago suburb of Naperville, Illinois by her parents Kerrwin and LeeShelle Short, Krueger attended Naperville Central High School, where she earned 4.0 honor roll recognition and was named an Illinois State Scholar. She was named PARADE All-American in 2008 and was twice named NSCAA/adidas Youth All-American in 2016 and 2017. Krueger helped Naperville to four Illinois state cup championships. In 2008, she was ranked a top-rated soccer recruit by the Chicago Sun-Times.

Krueger also ran track and won three state championships: two in the 800m run and one in the 400m dash. She was the first girl in Illinois history to win both runs Class AA track in the same year. She was named Chicago Tribune Toyota Athlete of the Week in May 2007.

Krueger played club soccer for the Chicago Magic. In 2009, she played for the Chicago Red Eleven of the USL W-League.

=== Florida State Seminoles, 2008–2012 ===
Krueger attended Florida State University, where she played for the Florida State Seminoles women's soccer team, earned her bachelor's degree in Criminology with a minor in Sociology, and was a six-time member of the Dean's list. She also earned a master's degree in Sports Management.

During Krueger's freshman season, she was a starting player in 18 of the 23 games in which she played, scored two goals and provided six assists. Her six assists tied for third on the team and she ranked fifth in shots with 39. Krueger was one of two freshman to play in every game of the season. During the team's season opener against the University of Central Florida, Krueger scored a brace in the team's 5–0 win. Krueger played in all four games of the 2008 NCAA College Cup before being eliminated in the quarterfinals by Notre Dame.

As a sophomore in 2009, Krueger ranked sixth in assists in the Atlantic Coast Conference (ACC) despite missing the first six games of the season due to injury. She was a starting player in 7 of the 13 games she played. Her eighth career assist in just 13 ACC career games, made her Florida State's all-time leader for assists in ACC play. In 2010, Krueger finished her junior season ranked fourth on the team in assists with three. She ranked third on the team in goals with five. She was one of six players on the team to start every game during the regular season and during the NCAA College Cup. Krueger was named to the All-ACC Second Team.

In 2011, Krueger suffered a season-ending injury and red-shirted the season. During her final season with the Seminoles in 2012, Krueger transitioned into playing as an outside back and was a key part defensive line that set multiple school records, including shutouts (17), GAA (0.62) and fewest goals allowed in ACC play (4). She helped set a new NCAA record for the 13th longest streak of shutouts (9). Krueger started in all of the team's five games at the 2012 NCAA College Cup and notched two assists. She was named to the NSCAA Southeast All-Region First Team, NSCAA Scholar All-American Second Team, NSCAA South Scholar All-Region First Team, Capital One/CoSIDA Academic All-District IV First Team, All-ACC Second Team. Krueger earned ACC Academic Honor Roll four times and was named to FSU's President's List twice. Her 11 career assists tied the school record in assists in ACC games.

== Club career ==
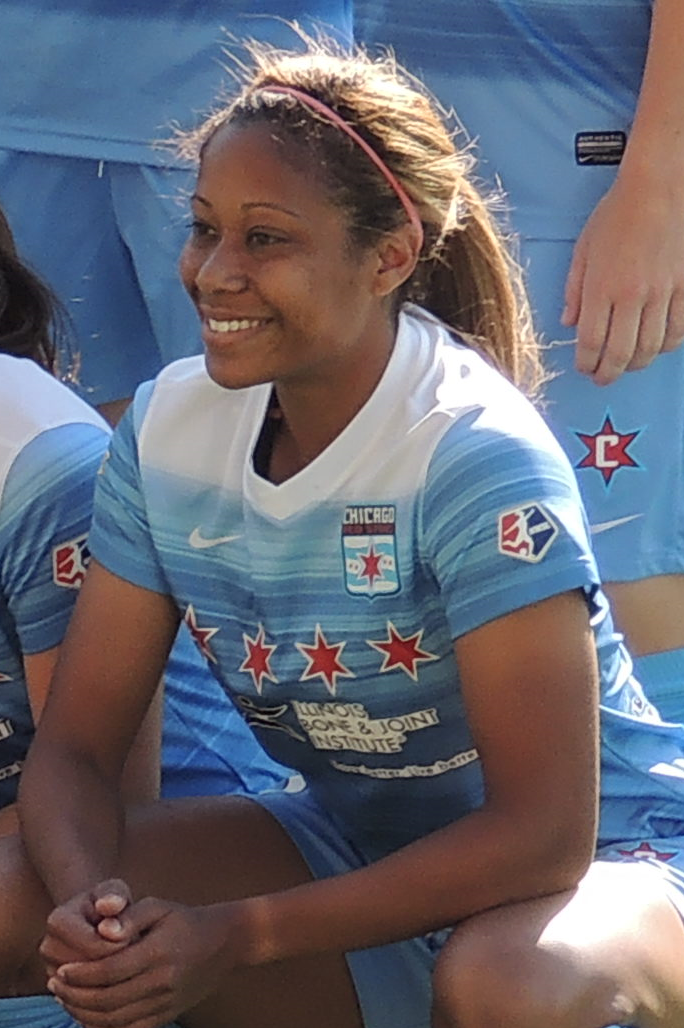
Krueger in the Red Stars starting lineup, June 2016

=== Avaldsnes Football Club, 2015 ===
Due to two season-ending injuries Krueger did not play in the National Women's Soccer League during the league's initial two seasons despite being selected by the Boston Breakers as the fifth overall pick in the 2013 NWSL College Draft. In 2015, Krueger played successfully for Avaldsnes IL of the Norwegian Toppserien league and was honored as one of the Top XI in the Toppserien at the 2015 NISO Awards.

=== Chicago Red Stars, 2016–2023 ===
Krueger was the fifth overall pick at the 2013 NWSL College Draft by the Boston Breakers but did not compete due during the 2013 season due to knee injury. She was acquired by the Chicago Red Stars ahead of the 2014 season. Krueger suffered another season-ending injury before the 2014 season started.

After a successful stint in 2015 with Avaldsnes in Norway, Chicago Red Stars signed Krueger to compete in 2016 NWSL season.

Krueger was a starting defender in every match of the 2016 season and scored two goals. She was named to the league's Second XI team for the season.

In 2017, Krueger competed in 22 regular season games for the Red Stars. She was named to the NWSL Team of the Month for May, June and July. At the end of the season, she was named to the 2017 NWSL Best XI and nominated for Defender of the Year.

Krueger missed the first 10 games of the 2018 NWSL season after sustaining an ankle injury while playing for the national team in the 2018 SheBelieves Cup.

Krueger was nominated for Defender of the Year for a second time in the 2019 season.

=== Washington Spirit, 2024– ===
Krueger left the Red Stars, signing a three-year deal with the Washington Spirit, in January 2024.

== International career ==
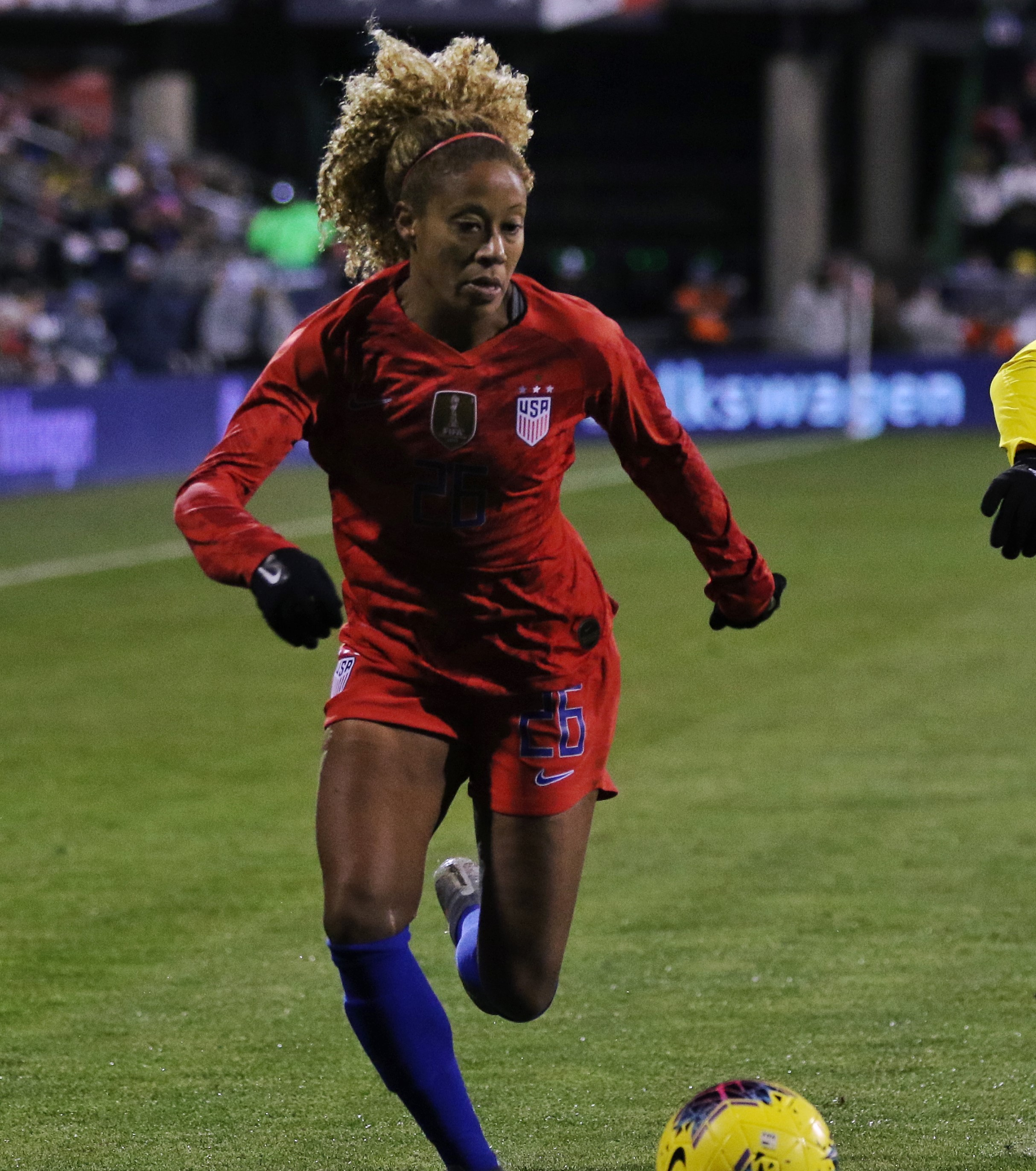
Krueger playing in an international friendly against Sweden, November 2019

Krueger has represented the United States on the senior national team as well as numerous youth national teams, including: under-16, under-17, under-20 and under-23. She competed with the United States under-20 team at the 2010 FIFA U-20 Women's World Cup in Germany.

Krueger received her first international call up to the senior team on October 6, 2016, by head coach Jill Ellis. She made her senior international debut on October 19, 2016, playing all 90 minutes against Switzerland women's national football team. Four days later, she played another 90 minutes against Switzerland in the same series of friendly matches.

In 2018, Krueger competed with the national team at the Tournament of Nations, where she played in eight matches, starting two. She played in two games during the 2018 CONCACAF Women's Championship and served one assist, helping the U.S. qualify for the 2019 FIFA Women's World Cup in France.

In May 2019, Krueger was surprisingly not included on the 23-player roster for the World Cup. Following the US World Cup win in August, Short was named to the roster for Victory Tour games against Portugal.

After Vlatko Andonovski was named head coach of the national team in October 2019, Krueger was named to his first training camp roster and first friendly matches against Sweden and Portugal. During the Sweden match on November 8, Krueger was a starting outside back and played for the full length of the 3–2 win. Six minutes into the game, her pass to Christen Press resulted in the game-opening goal.

In February 2020, Krueger was named to the roster for the 2020 SheBelieves Cup. During the U.S.' final match against Japan, Krueger was a substitute in the 61st minute and helped the team win 3–1.

On June 23, 2021, Krueger was included on the roster for the senior national team at the 2020 Tokyo Olympics.

On February 7, 2024, Kruger was selected for the roster for the 2024 CONCACAF W Gold Cup and appeared in three of the six matches including the final against Brazil as the U.S. won the inaugural edition of the competition.

Casey Krueger earned a spot on the 2024 U.S Women’s Soccer National Team competing in the 2024 Olympics in Paris. She appeared as a substitute in the gold medal game against Brazil, which the United States won 1–0 on a goal from Mallory Swanson.

== Personal life ==
In May 2020, Krueger announced her engagement to her long-term boyfriend and emergency medicine physician, Cody Krueger. They married on December 5, 2020.

In December 2021, Krueger announced she was pregnant with their first child. Krueger gave birth in July 2022 to a son, named Caleb.

== Career statistics ==
=== International ===
As of match played November 30, 2024

National Team	Year	Apps	Goals
United States
United States	2016	4	0
United States	2017	15	0
United States	2018	8	0
United States	2019	4	0
United States	2020	1	0
United States	2021	5	0
United States	2022	0	0
United States	2023	5	0
United States	2024	18	0
Total		60	0

== Honors ==
Washington Spirit

- NWSL Challenge Cup: 2025

United States

- Summer Olympic Games Gold Medal: 2024
- Summer Olympic Games Bronze Medal: 2020
- CONCACAF Women's Championship: 2018
- CONCACAF W Gold Cup: 2024
- SheBelieves Cup: 2018, 2020, 2021, 2024

Individual

- Toppserien Best XI: 2015
- NWSL Best XI: 2017, 2019, 2024
- NWSL Second XI: 2016
- NWSL Team of the Month: April 2019, June 2019
