= Twila Kilgore =

American soccer coach (born 1980)

Personal information
- Full name: Twila Argo Kilgore
- Birth name: Twila Argo Kaufman
- Date of birth: January 18, 1980 (age 46)
- Place of birth: Downey, California, U.S.
- Height: 5 ft 1 in (1.55 m)
- Positions: Midfielder; forward

Youth career
- –1998: Harvard-Westlake Wolverines
- Las Virgenes Blazers
- So Cal Blues

College career
Years	Team	Apps	(Gls)
1998–2001	Arizona Wildcats	74	(7)

Senior career*
Years	Team	Apps	(Gls)
- Arizona Heatwave

Managerial career
- 2004: Northern Arizona Lumberjacks (vol. asst.)
- 2004–2013: Pepperdine Waves (assistant)
- 2009: Los Angeles Legends
- 2014–2019: UC Davis Aggies
- 2019–2022: Houston Dash (assistant)
- 2019: United States U19
- 2022–2024: United States (assistant)
- 2022: United States U23
- 2023–2024: United States (interim)
- 2026: Houston Dash (technical director)
- * Club domestic league appearances and goals

Twila Argo Kilgore (née Kaufman; born January 18, 1980) is an American soccer coach and former player. She was appointed as assistant coach for the United States women's national team, initially under Vlatko Andonovski, and later served as interim head coach after Andonovski's resignation. She stepped down from coaching in September 2024 and most recently served as the technical director of National Women's Soccer League club Houston Dash from February to September 2026.

== Playing career ==
Kilgore was born in Downey, California, to Patricia Kaufman. In her youth, she played for the club side Las Virgenes Blazers, before later joining the Southern California Blues, with whom she won two state titles. In high school, she played soccer at Harvard-Westlake School, where she earned first team All-CIF honors during her senior year. In college, Kilgore played four years with the Arizona Wildcats from 1998 to 2001. She made 74 appearances during her career, scoring seven goals and recording three assists. After college, Kilgore joined the Arizona Heatwave and played in the USL W-League before becoming a coach.

== Coaching career ==
In 2004, Kilgore joined the Pepperdine University coaching staff as an assistant coach and associate coach. During her time at Pepperdine, Kilgore earned her USSF National "A" license. After spending 10 years with Pepperdine University, Kilgore took over as the head coach for the University of California, Davis women's team.

In 2019, Kilgore joined the Houston Dash as an assistant coach. During her time with the Houston Dash, Kilgore also served as a member of U.S. Soccer coaching staff, taking the United States U-19 Women's National Team (USWNT U-19) to the La Manga Tournament in 2020.

While serving as a member of the Houston Dash technical staff, Kilgore became the first American-born woman to earn the U.S. Soccer's top-level Pro License. After earning this license, Kilgore was named to lead the January 2022 USWNT U-23 camp. Kilgore was named as an assistant coach for the senior USWNT in February 2022.

On August 17, 2023, Kilgore was named the interim head coach for the senior USWNT following the resignation of Vlatko Andonovski, under whom Kilgore served as the assistant coach. Kilgore has served as assistant coach since the arrival of permanent head coach Emma Hayes in May 2024. Kilgore coached the team to victories during both the 2024 CONCACAF W Gold Cup and the 2024 SheBelieves Cup. Upon the arrival of Hayes, Kilgore resumed her role as an assistant coach to help the USWNT win Gold at the 2024 Summer Olympics. On September 24, 2024, U.S. Soccer announced the departure of Kilgore from the national coaching team, stating she would pursue other coaching opportunities.

On February 14, 2026, the Houston Dash announced the hiring of Kilgore as the club's technical director. On September 13, 2026, the Dash announced that they had fired both Kilgore and head coach Fabrice Gautrat.

== Personal life ==
Kilgore graduated from the University of Arizona in 2003 with a Bachelor of Arts in secondary education. She later earned a master's degree in coaching and athletic administration from Concordia University Irvine in 2009.

She married Jeremiah Kilgore in September 2021.

== Coaching statistics ==
As of April 6, 2024

Coaching record by team and tenure
Team	From	To	Record				
Team	From	To	G	W	D	L	Win %
Los Angeles Legends	2009	2009	12	2	3	7	16.67
UC Davis Aggies	2014	2019	200	108	29	63	54.00
United States U-19	March 2020	March 2020	3	2	0	1	66.67
United States	August 17, 2023	May 18, 2024	13	10	2	1	76.92
Career totals			228	122	34	72	53.51

== Managerial honors ==
=== United States Women ===
As assistant coach of women's senior national team

- CONCACAF W Championship: 2022
- SheBelieves Cup: 2023
- Summer Olympic Games Gold Medal: 2024

As Interim coach of women's senior national team

- CONCACAF W Gold Cup: 2024
- SheBelieves Cup: 2024
