= Katia Itzel García =

Mexican football referee (born 1992)

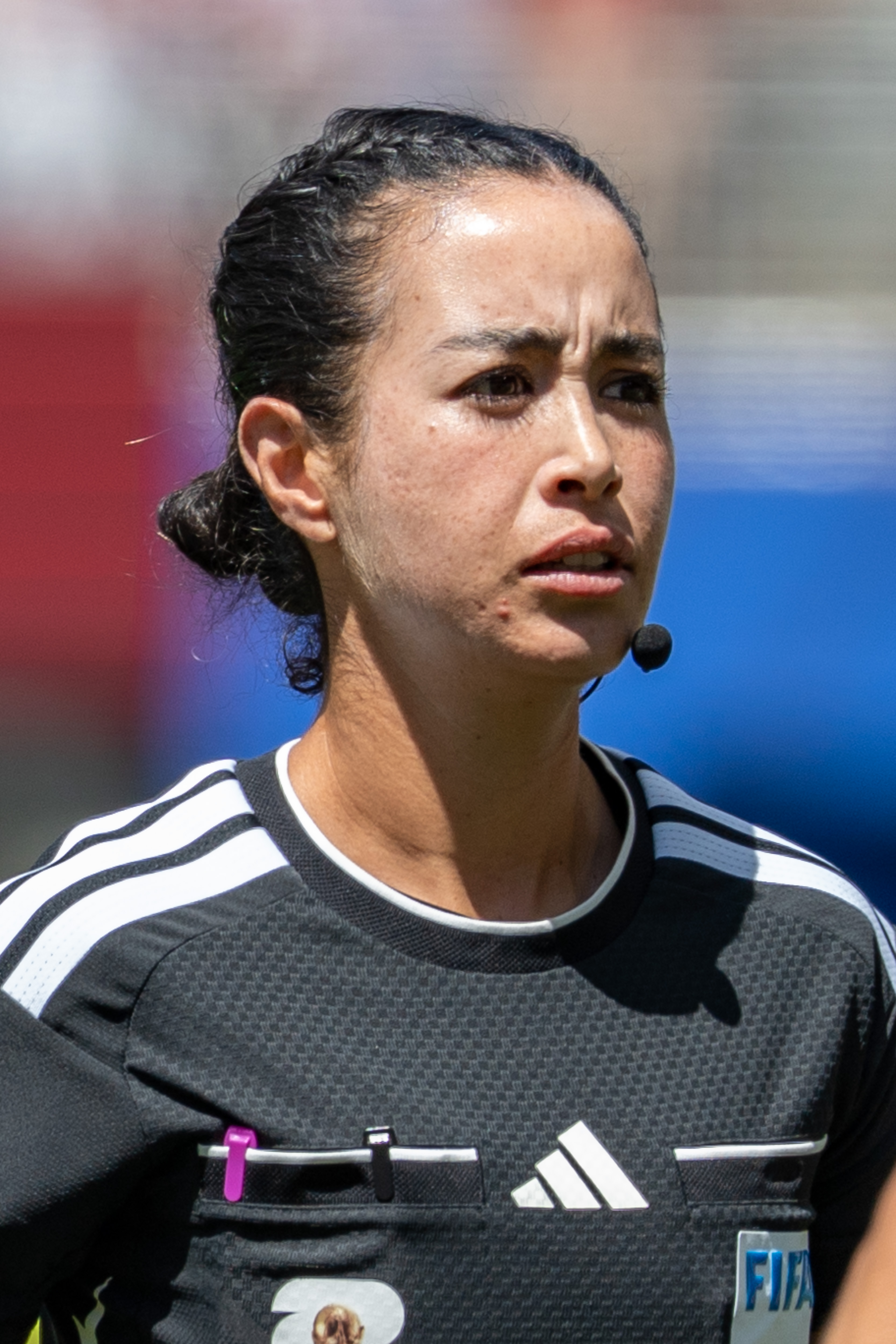
- García in 2026
- Full name: Katia Itzel García Mendoza
- Born: 1 September 1992 (age 34); Mexico City, Mexico

Domestic
Years	League	Role
2017–2025	Liga MX Femenil	Referee
2020–2024	Liga de Expansión MX	Referee
2024–present	Liga MX	Referee

International
Years	League	Role
2019–present	FIFA listed	Referee

Katia Itzel García Mendoza (born 1 September 1992) is a Mexican professional football referee. She has been a full international for FIFA since 2019. She began her professional refereeing career in 2017 and has since officiated matches both domestically and internationally. In March 2024, she became the first female referee in twenty years to officiate a Liga MX match.

== Early life ==
García graduated in Political Science from the National Autonomous University of Mexico and previously attended Escuela Nacional Preparatoria 6 "Antonio Caso".

== Refereeing career ==
=== Domestic career ===
García began her career in amateur refereeing in 2015 and entered the professional sector a year later. On 3 May 2017, Garcia made her professional debut as an assistant referee in a Copa MX Femenil match between Toluca and Morelia. García would spend the next years as an assistant referee in the Liga MX Femenil as well as the Liga Premier, Liga TDP and various other Mexican youth leagues. On 15 July 2018, García made her debut as a referee in a Liga MX Femenil between Puebla and Veracruz at Estadio Cuauhtémoc. In her first season she officiated a total of 17 matches in the regular season and two in the final phase. García would continue refereeing Liga MX Femenil matches as well as various youth leagues.

On 15 February 2020, García was the fourth official for the Zacatepec and Oaxaca match at Estadio Agustín "Coruco" Díaz, the first time she was part of an officiating crew of a Mexican second division match. García was the referee for the second leg of the Guardianes 2020 Liga MX Femenil final between UANL and Monterrey at Estadio Universitario, the first league final she officiated, García has gone onto officiate multiple league finals as well as one Campeón de Campeones.

On 22 July 2022, García was the fourth official of the Necaxa and Juárez at Estadio Victoria, the first time she was part of an officiating crew for a Liga MX match. On 26 July 2022, García was the referee for a match between Atlético La Paz and Celaya, making her the first woman to officiate a Liga de Expansión MX match. On 9 March 2024, she refereed a match between Pachuca and Querétaro at Estadio Hidalgo, this was the first time in over twenty years that a woman officiated a Liga MX match. Four weeks later, García officiated a match between Puebla and Cruz Azul at Estadio Cuauhtémoc, she awarded a penalty to Cruz Azul in the final minutes after checking the VAR.

=== International career ===
García has been a FIFA listed referee since 2019. She officiated her first international match on 24 February 2020, a CONCACAF U-20 Championship match between the Dominican Republic U-20 and the United States U-20 in Santo Domingo. The following month, García was appointed to be an official at the 2020 SheBelieves Cup, where she refereed the match between the United States and Spain. She was part of a men's official international match for the first time on 8 June 2021, she was the fourth official of the match between Saint Vincent and the Grenadines and Cuba in St. George's, Grenada. The following year she was the referee for the 2022–23 CONCACAF Nations League C match between Bonaire and the U.S. Virgin Islands.

García would referee various CONCACAF 2023 FIFA Women's World Cup qualifiers including the 2022 CONCACAF W Championship final between the United States and Canada. García was appointed to be an official at the 2022 FIFA U-17 Women's World Cup in India where she officiated three matches, including the final. On January 9, 2023, FIFA appointed her to the officiating pool for the 2023 FIFA Women's World Cup in Australia and New Zealand. She officiated two matches in the group stage and was the fourth official in two knockout stage matches.

García was appointed to officiate at the inaugural 2024 CONCACAF W Gold Cup where she was in charge for three matches. García officiated the semi-final between the United States and Canada at Snapdragon Stadium where she dealt with a rain-soaked pitch that was deemed as "unplayable" by Canada manager Bev Priestman. United States interim manager Twila Kilgore, former players and members of the media also criticized the decision. Former referee Christina Unkel refuted that it was solely García's decision and that a match commissioner appeared to indicate to her to continue the waterlogged game.

On 3 April 2024, FIFA announced that García was appointed to be a referee for the 2024 Summer Olympics in Paris. She was assigned the opening round Group B match between Australia and Germany.

García served in 2026 as a referee at the 2026 FIFA World Cup. Her first service included serving as fourth official in a match between Netherlands and Japan on 14 June. On 19 June, García was co-officiating the World Cup match between USA and Australia when the match referee Felix Zwayer got muscle cramp in his legs during stoppage time. Garcia ran on to the pitch with pickle juice, in a moment that was later widely shared on social media.

García later made her debut as a World Cup head official on 25 June in Kansas City, having been appointed as the main referee for the Group F match between the Netherlands and Tunisia. This appointment marked a landmark moment in football history, making her the third woman ever to referee a men's World Cup match—following France's Stéphanie Frappart and the United States' Tori Penso.
