= Leigh Ann Brown =

American soccer player (born 1986)

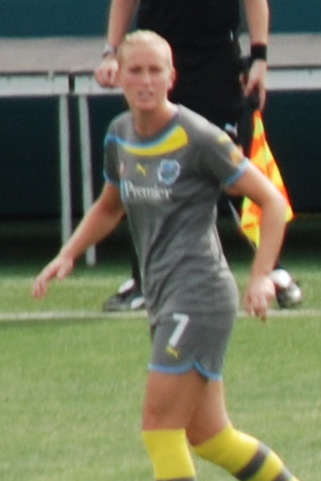
- August 2011

Personal information
- Full name: Leigh Ann Brown
- Birth name: Leigh Ann Robinson
- Date of birth: August 17, 1986 (age 40)
- Place of birth: Poway, California, United States
- Height: 5 ft 9 in (1.75 m)
- Positions: Midfielder; defender

College career
| Years | Team | Apps | (Gls) |
| 2004–2007 | San Diego Toreros | | |

Senior career*
| Years | Team | Apps | (Gls) |
| 2007 | San Diego Sunwaves | 11 | (4) |
| 2008 | SD United | | |
| 2009 | FC Gold Pride | 18 | (1) |
| 2010 | Atlanta Beat | 24 | (0) |
| 2011 | Philadelphia Independence | 17 | (0) |
| 2012 | Rossiyanka | | |
| 2012 | New York Fury | | |
| 2013–2015 | FC Kansas City | 65 | (1) |

International career
| 2013 | United States | 2 | (0) |
- * Club domestic league appearances and goals

Leigh Ann Brown (née Robinson; born August 17, 1986) is an American former soccer defender. She previously played for FC Kansas City of the National Women's Soccer League, FC Gold Pride, Atlanta Beat, and the Philadelphia Independence of the Women's Professional Soccer (WPS) and earned two caps with the United States women's national soccer team.

== Early life ==
Born in Poway, California, Brown attended Mt. Carmel High School where she led her team to two league championships and two second-place finishes. As a freshman, she was named Second Team Palomar League while winning the CIF San Diego section championship. She was named Second Team North County and First Team Palomar League during her sophomore year and earned All-North County and First Team Avocado League honors her junior and senior seasons. She also played for the 2003 National Champion and 2001 Regional Finalist San Diego Surf teams.

=== University of San Diego, 2004–2007 ===
Brown attended the University of San Diego where she played for the Toreros from 2004 to 2007. During her freshman season, she started 17 games. She was named second-team All-WCC her sophomore season before being named to the first-team the subsequent two seasons. After her senior season, she earned a fourth-team All-American selection by Soccerbuzz Magazine. Brown played in 75 of the team's 81 games throughout her career at San Diego.

== Playing career ==
=== Club ===
==== WPS, 2009–2011 ====
Brown was selected by FC Gold Pride during the sixth round (40th overall) of the 2009 WPS Draft for the inaugural season of the WPS. She scored her only goal of her WPS tenure on May 3, 2009 in a 1–0 home win versus Sky Blue FC. At the end of the season, Brown was deemed surplus to requirements by Albertin Montoya and was subsequently chosen by Atlanta Beat as the first overall choice in the 2009 WPS Expansion Draft.

Brown signed with the Atlanta Beat after being selected first overall in the 2009 WPS Expansion Draft in preparation for the 2010 season. She made 24 appearances for the Beat with 21 starts playing for a total of 1,972 minutes.

In 2011, Brown played for the Philadelphia Independence. She started in all 19 of her appearances and played a total of 1,740 minutes. She re-signed with the Independence for the 2012 season; however the WPS suspended operations before the season began.

==== NWSL: FC Kansas City, 2013–2015 ====
In February 2013, Brown signed with FC Kansas City for the inaugural season of the NWSL. During the team's first defeat in regular season play, Brown provided the assist on Kansas City's lone goal against the Western New York Flash. She came third in voting for NWSL Defender of the Year behind Becky Sauerbrunn and Christie Rampone in the 2013 season.

She retired at the end of the 2015 season.

=== International ===
On August 22, 2013, Leigh Ann Brown received her first call up to the United States senior team by US Head Coach Tom Sermanni.

== Honors and awards ==
=== Individual ===
- NWSL Best XI: 2013
- NWSL Second XI: 2015

=== Team ===
with FC Kansas City:

- NWSL championship: 2014, 2015
