= NWSL Best XI =

Annual awards in US women's soccer

NWSL Best XI and Second XI are annual awards presented to the best and second-best eleven players in the National Women's Soccer League (NWSL).

As of 2024, the teams of the season awards are voted on by players (40%), owners/general managers/coaches (25%), media (25%), and fans (10%). Voters for the teams of the season awards are required to name one goalkeeper, four defenders, and a combination of six midfielders and forwards.

== 2013 ==
Best XI

POSITION	PLAYER	CLUB	NOTE
Goalkeeper	(United States) Nicole Barnhart	FC Kansas City	10 shutouts
Defender	(United States) Christie Rampone	Sky Blue FC	1.20 GAA
Defender	(United States) Leigh Ann Robinson	FC Kansas City	5 assists
Defender	(United States) Becky Sauerbrunn	FC Kansas City	1.00 GAA
Defender	(United States) Brittany Taylor	Western New York Flash	3 goals, 4 assists
Midfielder	(United States) Lori Chalupny	Chicago Red Stars	5 goals, 4 assists
Midfielder	(Wales) Jess Fishlock	Seattle Reign FC	4 goals
Midfielder	(United States) Lauren Holiday	FC Kansas City	12 goals, 9 assists
Midfielder	(Canada) Diana Matheson	Washington Spirit	8 goals, 3 assists
Forward	(United States) Sydney Leroux	Boston Breakers	11 goals, 2 assists
Forward	(United States) Abby Wambach	Western New York Flash	11 goals, 8 assists

Second XI

POSITION	PLAYER	CLUB
Goalkeeper	(United States) Adrianna Franch	Western New York Flash
Defender	(United States) Rachel Buehler	Portland Thorns
Defender	(Australia) Caitlin Foord	Sky Blue FC
Defender	(United States) Ali Krieger	Washington Spirit
Defender	(Canada) Lauren Sesselmann	FC Kansas City
Midfielder	(United States) Megan Rapinoe	Seattle Reign FC
Midfielder	(Canada) Desiree Scott	FC Kansas City
Midfielder	(United States) Erika Tymrak	FC Kansas City
Forward	(United States) Alex Morgan	Portland Thorns
Forward	(England) Lianne Sanderson	Boston Breakers
Forward	(Canada) Christine Sinclair	Portland Thorns

== 2014 ==
Best XI

POSITION	PLAYER	CLUB	NOTE
Goalkeeper	(United States) Alyssa Naeher	Boston Breakers	106 saves
Defender	(United States) Kendall Fletcher	Seattle Reign FC	.83 team GAA
Defender	(United States) Ali Krieger	Washington Spirit	1 goal
Defender	(United States) Christie Rampone	Sky Blue FC	1 goal, 2 assists
Defender	(United States) Becky Sauerbrunn	FC Kansas City	8 shutouts
Midfielder	(Spain) Verónica Boquete	Portland Thorns FC	4 goals, 6 assists
Midfielder	(Wales) Jess Fishlock	Seattle Reign FC	4 goals, 8 assists
Midfielder	(Scotland) Kim Little	Seattle Reign FC	16 goals, 7 assists
Forward	(United States) Lauren Holiday	FC Kansas City	8 goals, 7 assists
Forward	(Japan) Nahomi Kawasumi	Seattle Reign FC	9 goals, 5 assists
Forward	(United States) Amy Rodriguez	FC Kansas City	13 goals, 3 assists

Second XI

POSITION	PLAYER	CLUB	NOTE
Goalkeeper	(United States) Hope Solo	Seattle Reign FC	5 shutouts
Defender	(United States) Lauren Barnes	Seattle Reign FC	.83 team GAA
Defender	(Australia) Stephanie Catley	Portland Thorns FC	5 assists
Defender	(United States) Stephanie Cox	Seattle Reign FC	.83 team GAA
Defender	(United States) Julie Johnston	Chicago Red Stars	Rookie of the Year
Midfielder	(United States) Carli Lloyd	Western New York Flash	8 goals, 5 assists
Midfielder	(United States) Allie Long	Portland Thorns FC	9 goals, 3 assists
Midfielder	(United States) Heather O'Reilly	Boston Breakers	9 goals, 5 assists
Forward	(United States) Christen Press	Chicago Red Stars	6 goals
Forward	(United States) Jessica McDonald	Portland Thorns FC	11 goals, 1 assist
Forward	(England) Jodie Taylor	Washington Spirit	11 goals, 2 assists

== 2015 ==
Announced September 24, 2015

Best XI

POSITION	PLAYER	CLUB	NOTE
Goalkeeper	(United States) Michelle Betos	Portland Thorns FC	45 saves
Defender	(United States) Lauren Barnes	Seattle Reign FC	1,800 minutes
Defender	(United States) Julie Johnston	Chicago Red Stars	1.10 team GAA
Defender	(United States) Amy LePeilbet	FC Kansas City	1,800 minutes
Defender	(United States) Becky Sauerbrunn	FC Kansas City	1.00 GAA
Midfielder	(Wales) Jess Fishlock	Seattle Reign FC	8 goals, 2 assists
Midfielder	(Scotland) Kim Little	Seattle Reign FC	10 goals, 7 assists
Midfielder	(United States) Allie Long	Portland Thorns FC	10 goals, 4 assists
Forward	(United States) Crystal Dunn	Washington Spirit	15 goals, 3 assists
Forward	(United States) Christen Press	Chicago Red Stars	10 goals, 2 assists
Forward	(United States) Beverly Yanez	Seattle Reign FC	9 goals

Second XI

POSITION	PLAYER	CLUB	NOTE
Goalkeeper	(United States) Nicole Barnhart	FC Kansas City	8 shutouts
Defender	(United States) Stephanie Cox	Seattle Reign FC	1,800 minutes
Defender	(United States) Kendall Fletcher	Seattle Reign FC	2 goals, 2 assists
Defender	(United States) Arin Gilliland	Chicago Red Stars	1.10 team GAA
Defender	(United States) Leigh Ann Robinson	FC Kansas City	1,800 minutes
Midfielder	(United States) Danielle Colaprico	Chicago Red Stars	1,776 minutes
Midfielder	(United States) Lauren Holiday	FC Kansas City	2 goals, 2 assists
Midfielder	(United States) Carli Lloyd	Houston Dash	4 goals
Midfielder	(United States) Keelin Winters	Seattle Reign FC	1,654 minutes
Forward	(United States) Sofia Huerta	Chicago Red Stars	6 goals, 3 assists
Forward	(United States) Megan Rapinoe	Seattle Reign FC	5 goals, 5 assists

== 2016 ==
Announced October 7, 2016

Best XI

POSITION	PLAYER	CLUB	NOTE
Goalkeeper	(United States) Ashlyn Harris	Orlando Pride	62 saves
Defender	(United States) Lauren Barnes	Seattle Reign FC	1,775 minutes
Defender	(United States) Arin Gilliland	Chicago Red Stars	1.00 team GAA
Defender	(United States) Emily Menges	Portland Thorns FC	0.95 team GAA
Defender	(United States) Becky Sauerbrunn	FC Kansas City	1.00 team GAA
Midfielder	(United States) Tobin Heath	Portland Thorns FC	Goal, 10 assists
Midfielder	(United States) Allie Long	Portland Thorns FC	6 goals, 2 assists
Forward	(United States) Jessica McDonald	Western New York Flash	10 goals, 7 assists
Forward	(United States) Kealia Ohai	Houston Dash	11 goals, 4 assists
Forward	(United States) Christen Press	Chicago Red Stars	8 goals
Forward	(United States) Lynn Williams	Western New York Flash	11 goals, 5 assists

Second XI

POSITION	PLAYER	CLUB	NOTE
Goalkeeper	(United States) Alyssa Naeher	Chicago Red Stars	1.00 GAA
Defender	(United States) Julie Johnston	Chicago Red Stars	1.00 team GAA
Defender	(United States) Ali Krieger	Washington Spirit	1.05 team GAA
Defender	(United States) Christie Rampone	Sky Blue FC	1,800 minutes
Defender	(United States) Casey Short	Chicago Red Stars	1,781 minutes
Midfielder	(United States) Danielle Colaprico	Chicago Red Stars	Goal, 2 assists
Midfielder	(United States) Vanessa DiBernardo	Chicago Red Stars	7 assists
Midfielder	(Wales) Jess Fishlock	Seattle Reign FC	Goals, 4 assists
Midfielder	(Scotland) Kim Little	Seattle Reign FC	6 goals, 2 assists
Forward	(United States) Crystal Dunn	Washington Spirit	2 goals, 5 assists
Forward	(United States) Shea Groom	FC Kansas City	8 goals

== 2017 ==
Announced October 12, 2017

Best XI

POSITION	PLAYER	CLUB	NOTE
Goalkeeper	(United States) Adrianna Franch	Portland Thorns FC	11 shutouts, 80 saves, .83 GAA
Defender	(United States) Casey Short	Chicago Red Stars	1 goal, 3rd-best defense in NWSL
Defender	(United States) Abby Dahlkemper	North Carolina Courage	121 corner kicks taken, 2 assists
Defender	(United States) Becky Sauerbrunn	FC Kansas City	157 clearances, 24 blocks, 1 goal, 2 assists
Defender	(United States) Ali Krieger	Orlando Pride	99 clearances, 49 interceptions, 2 assists
Midfielder	(Wales) Jess Fishlock	Seattle Reign FC	7 goals, 2 assists
Midfielder	(United States) Sam Mewis	North Carolina Courage	6 goals, 3 assists
Midfielder	(United States) McCall Zerboni	North Carolina Courage	3 goals, 1 assist
Forward	(Brazil) Marta	Orlando Pride	13 goals, 6 assists, 64 chances created
Forward	(Australia) Sam Kerr	Sky Blue FC	17 goals, 4 assists, 2 hattricks, 1 4-goal game
Forward	(United States) Christen Press	Chicago Red Stars	11 goals, 4 assists

Second XI

Announced October 10, 2017

POSITION	PLAYER	CLUB	NOTE
Goalkeeper	(United States) Katelyn Rowland	North Carolina Courage	39 saves, 8 shutouts
Defender	(Australia) Steph Catley	Orlando Pride	2,032 minutes played
Defender	(New Zealand) Abby Erceg	North Carolina Courage	1 goal, 2 assists
Defender	(United States) Meghan Klingenberg	Portland Thorns FC	6 assists
Defender	(United States) Emily Menges	Portland Thorns FC	2,063 minutes played
Midfielder	(United States) Danielle Colaprico	Chicago Red Stars	1,903 minutes played
Midfielder	(United States) Julie Ertz	Chicago Red Stars	4 goals, 3 assists
Midfielder	(United States) Lindsey Horan	Portland Thorns FC	4 goals, 2 assists
Midfielder	(United States) Sofia Huerta	Chicago Red Stars	6 goals, 4 assists
Forward	(United States) Alex Morgan	Orlando Pride	9 goals, 4 assists
Forward	(United States) Megan Rapinoe	Seattle Reign FC	12 goals, 1 assist

== 2018 ==
Announced September 20, 2018

Best XI

POSITION	PLAYER	CLUB
Goalkeeper	(United States) Adrianna Franch	Portland Thorns FC
Defender	(United States) Emily Sonnett	Portland Thorns FC
Defender	(United States) Abby Dahlkemper	North Carolina Courage
Defender	(United States) Becky Sauerbrunn	Utah Royals FC
Defender	(New Zealand) Abby Erceg	North Carolina Courage
Midfielder	(United States) Tobin Heath	Portland Thorns FC
Midfielder	(United States) Lindsey Horan	Portland Thorns FC
Midfielder	(United States) McCall Zerboni	North Carolina Courage
Forward	(United States) Crystal Dunn	North Carolina Courage
Forward	(Australia) Sam Kerr	Chicago Red Stars
Forward	(United States) Megan Rapinoe	Seattle Reign

Second XI

POSITION	PLAYER	CLUB
Goalkeeper	(Australia) Lydia Williams	Seattle Reign
Defender	(United States) Emily Menges	Portland Thorns FC
Defender	(United States) Merritt Mathias	North Carolina Courage
Defender	(Australia) Steph Catley	Seattle Reign
Defender	(United States) Julie Ertz	Chicago Red Stars
Midfielder	(United States) Carli Lloyd	Sky Blue FC
Midfielder	(Canada) Christine Sinclair	Portland Thorns FC
Midfielder	(Brazil) Debinha	North Carolina Courage
Forward	(United States) Lynn Williams	North Carolina Courage
Forward	(United States) Sofia Huerta	Houston Dash
Forward	(England) Rachel Daly	Houston Dash

== 2019 ==
Announced October 24, 2019

Best XI

POSITION	PLAYER	CLUB
Goalkeeper	(United States) Aubrey Bledsoe	Washington Spirit
Defender	(United States) Abby Dahlkemper	North Carolina Courage
Defender	(United States) Ali Krieger	Orlando Pride
Defender	(United States) Becky Sauerbrunn	Utah Royals FC
Defender	(United States) Casey Short	Chicago Red Stars
Midfielder	(United States) Julie Ertz	Chicago Red Stars
Midfielder	(United States) Lindsey Horan	Portland Thorns FC
Midfielder	(United States) Rose Lavelle	Washington Spirit
Forward	(United States) Tobin Heath	Portland Thorns FC
Forward	(Australia) Sam Kerr	Chicago Red Stars
Forward	(United States) Christen Press	Utah Royals FC

Second XI

POSITION	PLAYER	CLUB
Goalkeeper	(United States) Alyssa Naeher	Chicago Red Stars
Defender	(United States) Lauren Barnes	Reign FC
Defender	(New Zealand) Abby Erceg	North Carolina Courage
Defender	(United States) Kelley O'Hara	Utah Royals FC
Defender	(United States) Emily Sonnett	Portland Thorns FC
Midfielder	(United States) Bethany Balcer	Reign FC
Midfielder	(United States) Crystal Dunn	North Carolina Courage
Midfielder	(Japan) Yūki Nagasato	Chicago Red Stars
Forward	(United States) Kristen Hamilton	North Carolina Courage
Forward	(United States) Carli Lloyd	Sky Blue FC
Forward	(United States) Megan Rapinoe	Reign FC

== 2020 ==
The 2020 NWSL regular season was cancelled due to the COVID-19 pandemic.

== 2021 ==
Announced November 17, 2021

Best XI

POSITION	PLAYER	CLUB
Goalkeeper	(Canada) Kailen Sheridan	NJ/NY Gotham FC
Defender	(United States) Caprice Dydasco	NJ/NY Gotham FC
Defender	(United States) Alana Cook	OL Reign
Defender	(United States) Sarah Gorden	Chicago Red Stars
Defender	(United States) Carson Pickett	North Carolina Courage
Midfielder/Forward	(United States) Ashley Hatch	Washington Spirit
Midfielder/Forward	(Wales) Jess Fishlock	OL Reign
Midfielder/Forward	(France) Eugénie Le Sommer	OL Reign
Midfielder/Forward	(United States) Margaret Purce	NJ/NY Gotham FC
Midfielder/Forward	(United States) Trinity Rodman	Washington Spirit
Midfielder/Forward	(United States) Angela Salem	Portland Thorns FC

Second XI

POSITION	PLAYER	CLUB
Goalkeeper	(United States) Bella Bixby	Portland Thorns FC
Defender	(United States) Sofia Huerta	OL Reign
Defender	(United States) Emily Menges	Portland Thorns FC
Defender	(United States) Emily Fox	Racing Louisville FC
Defender	(United States) Meghan Klingenberg	Portland Thorns FC
Midfielder/Forward	(United States) Bethany Balcer	OL Reign
Midfielder/Forward	(United States) Lindsey Horan	Portland Thorns FC
Midfielder/Forward	(United States) Mallory Pugh	Chicago Red Stars
Midfielder/Forward	(England) Rachel Daly	Houston Dash
Midfielder/Forward	(United States) Sydney Leroux	Orlando Pride
Midfielder/Forward	(Nigeria) Ifeoma Onumonu	NJ/NY Gotham FC

== 2022 ==
Announced October 25, 2022

Best XI

POSITION	PLAYER	CLUB
Goalkeeper	(Canada) Kailen Sheridan	San Diego Wave FC
Defender	(United States) Alana Cook	OL Reign
Defender	(United States) Naomi Girma	San Diego Wave FC
Defender	(United States) Sofia Huerta	OL Reign
Defender	(United States) Carson Pickett	North Carolina Courage
Midfielder/Forward	(United States) Sam Coffey	Portland Thorns FC
Midfielder/Forward	(United States) Lo'eau LaBonta	Kansas City Current
Midfielder/Forward	(United States) Alex Morgan	San Diego Wave FC
Midfielder/Forward	(Brazil) Debinha	North Carolina Courage
Midfielder/Forward	(United States) Mallory Pugh	Chicago Red Stars
Midfielder/Forward	(United States) Sophia Smith	Portland Thorns FC

Second XI

POSITION	PLAYER	CLUB
Goalkeeper	(United States) Adrianna Franch	Kansas City Current
Defender	(United States) Kelli Hubly	Portland Thorns FC
Defender	(United States) Hailie Mace	Kansas City Current
Defender	(United States) Tatumn Milazzo	Chicago Red Stars
Defender	(United States) Becky Sauerbrunn	Portland Thorns FC
Midfielder/Forward	(Brazil) Kerolin	North Carolina Courage
Midfielder/Forward	(Wales) Jess Fishlock	OL Reign
Midfielder/Forward	(United States) Rose Lavelle	OL Reign
Midfielder/Forward	(Mexico) Diana Ordóñez	North Carolina Courage
Midfielder/Forward	(United States) Megan Rapinoe	OL Reign
Midfielder/Forward	(England) Ebony Salmon	Houston Dash

== 2023 ==
Announced November 6, 2023

Best XI

POSITION	PLAYER	CLUB
Goalkeeper	(United States) Jane Campbell	Houston Dash
Defender	(United States) Naomi Girma	San Diego Wave FC
Defender	(United States) Ali Krieger	NJ/NY Gotham FC
Defender	(United States) Sarah Gorden	Angel City FC
Defender	(United States) Sam Staab	Washington Spirit
Midfielder/Forward	(United States) Sam Coffey	Portland Thorns FC
Midfielder/Forward	(Brazil) Debinha	Kansas City Current
Midfielder/Forward	(United States) Jaedyn Shaw	San Diego Wave FC
Midfielder/Forward	(Brazil) Kerolin	North Carolina Courage
Midfielder/Forward	(United States) Sophia Smith	Portland Thorns FC
Midfielder/Forward	(United States) Lynn Williams	NJ/NY Gotham FC

Second XI

POSITION	PLAYER	CLUB
Goalkeeper	(Canada) Kailen Sheridan	San Diego Wave FC
Defender	(United States) Emily Fox	North Carolina Courage
Defender	(United States) Kaleigh Kurtz	North Carolina Courage
Defender	(United States) Jenna Nighswonger	NJ/NY Gotham FC
Defender	(United States) M.A. Vignola	Angel City FC
Midfielder/Forward	(United States) Savannah DeMelo	Racing Louisville FC
Midfielder/Forward	(United States) Savannah McCaskill	Angel City FC
Midfielder/Forward	(Republic of Ireland) Denise O'Sullivan	North Carolina Courage
Midfielder/Forward	(United States) Ashley Hatch	Washington Spirit
Midfielder/Forward	(United States) Alex Morgan	San Diego Wave FC
Midfielder/Forward	(United States) Trinity Rodman	Washington Spirit

== 2024 ==
Announced November 18, 2024

Best XI

POSITION	PLAYER	CLUB
Goalkeeper	(Germany) Ann-Katrin Berger	NJ/NY Gotham FC
Defender	(United States) Emily Sams	Orlando Pride
Defender	(United States) Casey Krueger	Washington Spirit
Defender	(United States) Kaleigh Kurtz	North Carolina Courage
Defender	(United States) Jenna Nighswonger	NJ/NY Gotham FC
Midfielder/Forward	(Malawi) Temwa Chawinga	Kansas City Current
Midfielder/Forward	(Zambia) Barbra Banda	Orlando Pride
Midfielder/Forward	(Brazil) Marta	Orlando Pride
Midfielder/Forward	(United States) Croix Bethune	Washington Spirit
Midfielder/Forward	(United States) Trinity Rodman	Washington Spirit
Midfielder/Forward	(United States) Sophia Smith	Portland Thorns FC

Second XI

POSITION	PLAYER	CLUB
Goalkeeper	(England) Anna Moorhouse	Orlando Pride
Defender	(United States) Naomi Girma	San Diego Wave FC
Defender	(United States) Tara McKeown	Washington Spirit
Defender	(United States) Kerry Abello	Orlando Pride
Defender	(United States) Ryan Williams	North Carolina Courage
Midfielder/Forward	(United States) Vanessa DiBernardo	Kansas City Current
Midfielder/Forward	(United States) Lo'eau LaBonta	Kansas City Current
Midfielder/Forward	(United States) Hal Hershfelt	Washington Spirit
Midfielder/Forward	(Spain) Esther González	NJ/NY Gotham FC
Midfielder/Forward	(United States) Rose Lavelle	NJ/NY Gotham FC
Midfielder/Forward	(United States) Yazmeen Ryan	NJ/NY Gotham FC

== 2025 ==
Announced November 19, 2025

Best XI

POSITION	PLAYER	CLUB
Goalkeeper	(Brazil) Lorena	Kansas City Current
Defender	(United States) Tara McKeown	Washington Spirit
Defender	(United States) Avery Patterson	Houston Dash
Defender	(United States) Izzy Rodriguez	Kansas City Current
Defender	(United States) Kayla Sharples	Kansas City Current
Midfielder/Forward	(Malawi) Temwa Chawinga	Kansas City Current
Midfielder/Forward	(United States) Sam Coffey	Portland Thorns
Midfielder/Forward	(Spain) Esther González	Gotham FC
Midfielder/Forward	(United States) Claire Hutton	Kansas City Current
Midfielder/Forward	(Japan) Manaka Matsukubo	North Carolina Courage
Midfielder/Forward	(United States) Olivia Moultrie	Portland Thorns FC

Second XI

POSITION	PLAYER	CLUB
Goalkeeper	(United States) Claudia Dickey	Seattle Reign
Defender	(United States) Jordyn Bugg	Seattle Reign
Defender	(United States) Hailie Mace	Kansas City Current
Defender	(United States) Lilly Reale	Gotham FC
Defender	(United States) Emily Sonnett	Gotham FC
Midfielder/Forward	(United States) Croix Bethune	Washington Spirit
Midfielder/Forward	(France) Delphine Cascarino	San Diego Wave
Midfielder/Forward	(France) Kenza Dali	San Diego Wave
Midfielder/Forward	(United States) Taylor Flint	Racing Louisville FC
Midfielder/Forward	(United States) Emma Sears	Racing Louisville FC
Midfielder/Forward	(Brazil) Bia Zaneratto	Kansas City Current

== 2026 ==
Announced November 18, 2026

Best XI

POSITION	PLAYER	CLUB
Goalkeeper	(Germany) Ann-Katrin Berger	Gotham FC
Defender	(Canada) Janine Sonis	Denver Summit FC
Defender	(United States) Tierna Davidson	Gotham FC
Defender	(United States) Kate Del Fava	Utah Royals
Defender	(Jamaica) Mimi Van Zanten	San Diego Wave FC
Midfielder	(France) Kenza Dali	San Diego Wave FC
Midfielder	(United States) Jaelin Howell	Gotham FC
Midfielder	(United States) Croix Bethune	Kansas City Current
Forward	(United States) Sophia Wilson	Portland Thorns FC
Forward	(United States) Ashley Sanchez	North Carolina Courage
Forward	(United States) Trinity Rodman	Washington Spirit

Second XI

POSITION	PLAYER	CLUB
Goalkeeper	(United States) Jane Campbell	Houston Dash
Defender	(United States) Gisele Thompson	Angel City FC
Defender	(United States) Sarah Gorden	Angel City FC
Defender	(United States) Kennedy Wesley	San Diego Wave FC
Defender	(United States) Evelyn Shores	Angel City FC
Midfielder	(Japan) Mina Tanaka	Utah Royals
Midfielder	(United States) Rose Lavelle	Gotham FC
Midfielder	(United States) Kimmi Ascanio	San Diego Wave FC
Forward	(Malawi) Temwa Chawinga	Kansas City Current
Forward	(Zambia) Barbra Banda	Orlando Pride
Forward	(Iceland) Sveindís Jane Jónsdóttir	Angel City FC

== Most selections ==
As of November 20, 2025. Only players with multiple total selections are included.

	Players active in the NWSL as of 2025 season
Bold*	Players on most recent Best XI or Second XI list

Nat.	Player	Best XI	Second XI	Total
(United States)	Becky Sauerbrunn	7	1	8
(Wales)	Jess Fishlock	5	2	7
(United States)	Ali Krieger	4	2	6
(United States)	Julie Ertz	2	4	6
(United States)	Megan Rapinoe	1	5	6
(United States)	Christen Press	4	1	5
(United States)	Sofia Huerta	1	4	5
(United States)	Casey Krueger	3	1	4
(United States)	Crystal Dunn	2	2	4
(United States)	Adrianna Franch	2	2	4
(United States)	Lauren Holiday	2	2	4
(United States)	Lindsey Horan	2	2	4
(United States)	Emily Menges	1	3	4
(United States)	Alex Morgan	1	3	4
(United States)	Carli Lloyd	0	4	4
(United States)	Sam Coffey*	3	0	3
(United States)	Abby Dahlkemper	3	0	3
(United States)	Tobin Heath	3	0	3
(Australia)	Sam Kerr	3	0	3
(United States)	Sophia Smith	3	0	3
(United States)	Lauren Barnes	2	1	3
(Brazil)	Debinha	2	1	3
(United States)	Naomi Girma	2	1	3
(Scotland)	Kim Little	2	1	3
(United States)	Allie Long	2	1	3
(United States)	Christie Pearce	2	1	3
(United States)	Trinity Rodman	2	1	3
(Canada)	Kailen Sheridan	2	1	3
(United States)	Lynn Williams	2	1	3
(New Zealand)	Abby Erceg	1	2	3
(United States)	Rose Lavelle	1	2	3
(United States)	Alyssa Naeher	1	2	3
(United States)	Emily Sonnett*	1	2	3
(United States)	Danielle Colaprico	0	3	3
(Australia)	Steph Catley	0	3	3
(United States)	Alana Cook	2	0	2
(Malawi)	Temwa Chawinga*	2	0	2
(United States)	Sarah Gorden	2	0	2
(United States)	Marta	2	0	2
(United States)	Carson Pickett	2	0	2
(United States)	McCall Zerboni	2	0	2
(United States)	Nicole Barnhart	1	1	2
(United States)	Croix Bethune*	1	1	2
(United States)	Leigh Ann Brown	1	1	2
(United States)	Kendall Fletcher	1	1	2
(Spain)	Esther González*	1	1	2
(United States)	Ashley Hatch	1	1	2
(Brazil)	Kerolin	1	1	2
(United States)	Kaleigh Kurtz	1	1	2
(United States)	Sydney Leroux	1	1	2
(United States)	Jessica McDonald	1	1	2
(United States)	Tara McKeown*	1	1	2
(United States)	Jenna Nighswonger	1	1	2
(United States)	Mallory Swanson	1	1	2
(United States)	Arin Wright	1	1	2
(United States)	Bethany Balcer	0	2	2
(United States)	Stephanie Cox	0	2	2
(England)	Rachel Daly	0	2	2
(United States)	Vanessa DiBernardo	0	2	2
(United States)	Emily Fox	0	2	2
(United States)	Meghan Klingenberg	0	2	2
(United States)	Hailie Mace*	0	2	2
(Canada)	Christine Sinclair	0	2	2

== See also ==
- List of sports awards honoring women
- NWSL Players' Awards
- NWSL awards
- NWSL records and statistics
- Women's soccer in the United States
