= Melissa Borjas =

Honduran football referee

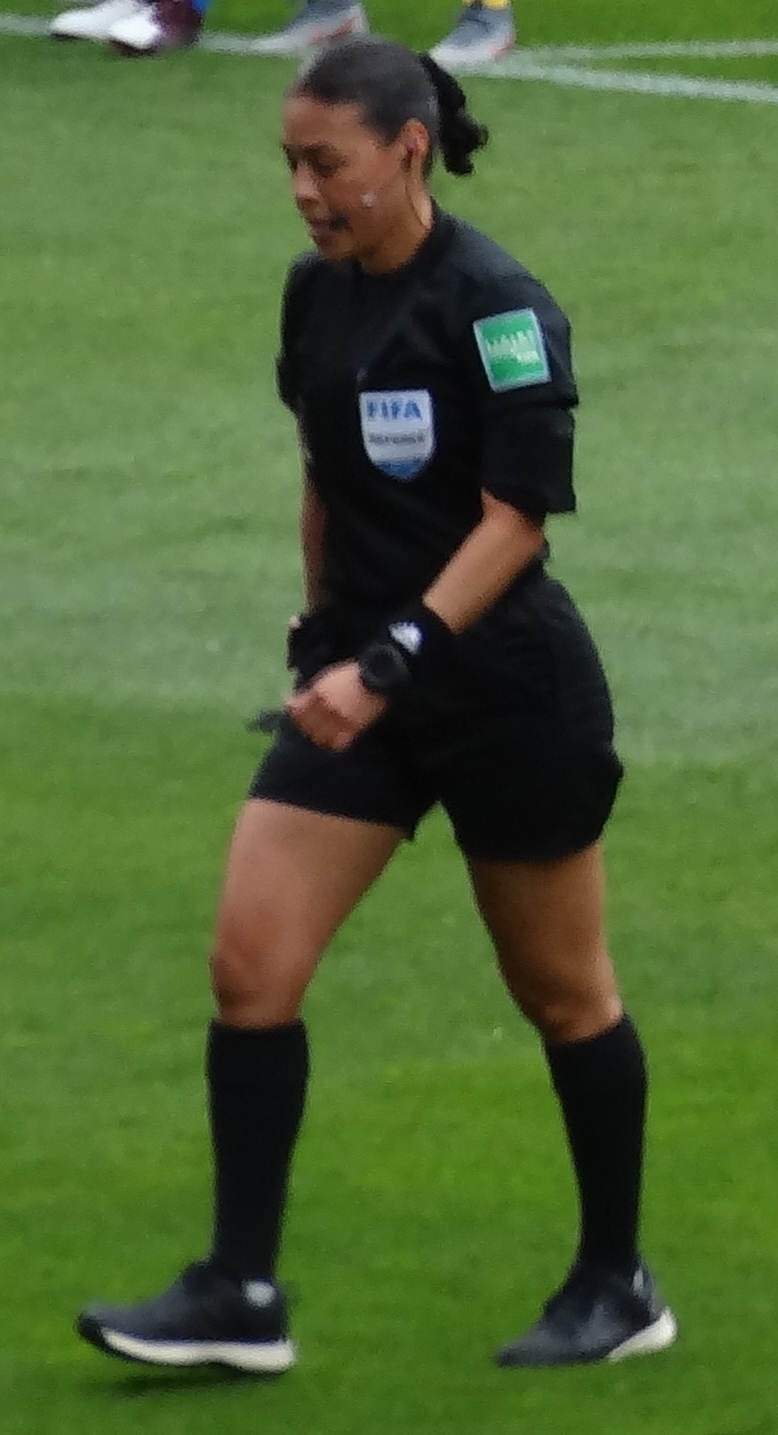
- Borjas in 2019
- Full name: Melissa Paola Borjas Pastrana
- Born: 20 October 1986 (age 40); Tegucigalpa, Honduras
- Other occupation: Manager of NWSL Referees
Years		Role
2013–2025		Referee

International
Years	League	Role
2013–2025	FIFA listed	Referee

Melissa Paola Borjas Pastrana (born 20 October 1986) is a Honduran football referee. She earned a degree in finance at Universidad Nacional Autónoma de Honduras, and has been a professional referee since 2011. She has been on the FIFA International Referees List since 2013.

== Career ==
Borjas was the first female referee to officiate a match in Liga Nacional de Fútbol Profesional de Honduras, the top flight of men's football in the country. She then became the first female official to referee a final match in Liga Nacional de Fútbol Profesional de Honduras when she officiated the first leg of the 2019 spring final between local teams Olimpia and Motagua on 26 May 2019.

In 2015, she became the first Honduran woman to referee at the FIFA Women's World Cup when she officiated a match between Japan and Ecuador. She was again appointed as a referee for the 2019 FIFA Women's World Cup in France. After the conclusion of the round of 16, she was selected as one of 11 referees who would officiate during the knockout stages.

On 9 January 2023, FIFA appointed her to the officiating pool for the 2023 FIFA Women's World Cup in Australia and New Zealand.

Borjas was appointed to the officiating pool at the 2024 CONCACAF W Gold Cup and was also chosen to officiate the final between the United States and Brazil in San Diego on March 10, 2024.

Borjas retired from the field in 2025 to become the manager of NWSL referees for the Professional Referees Organization.
