= Yasmim =

Brazilian footballer

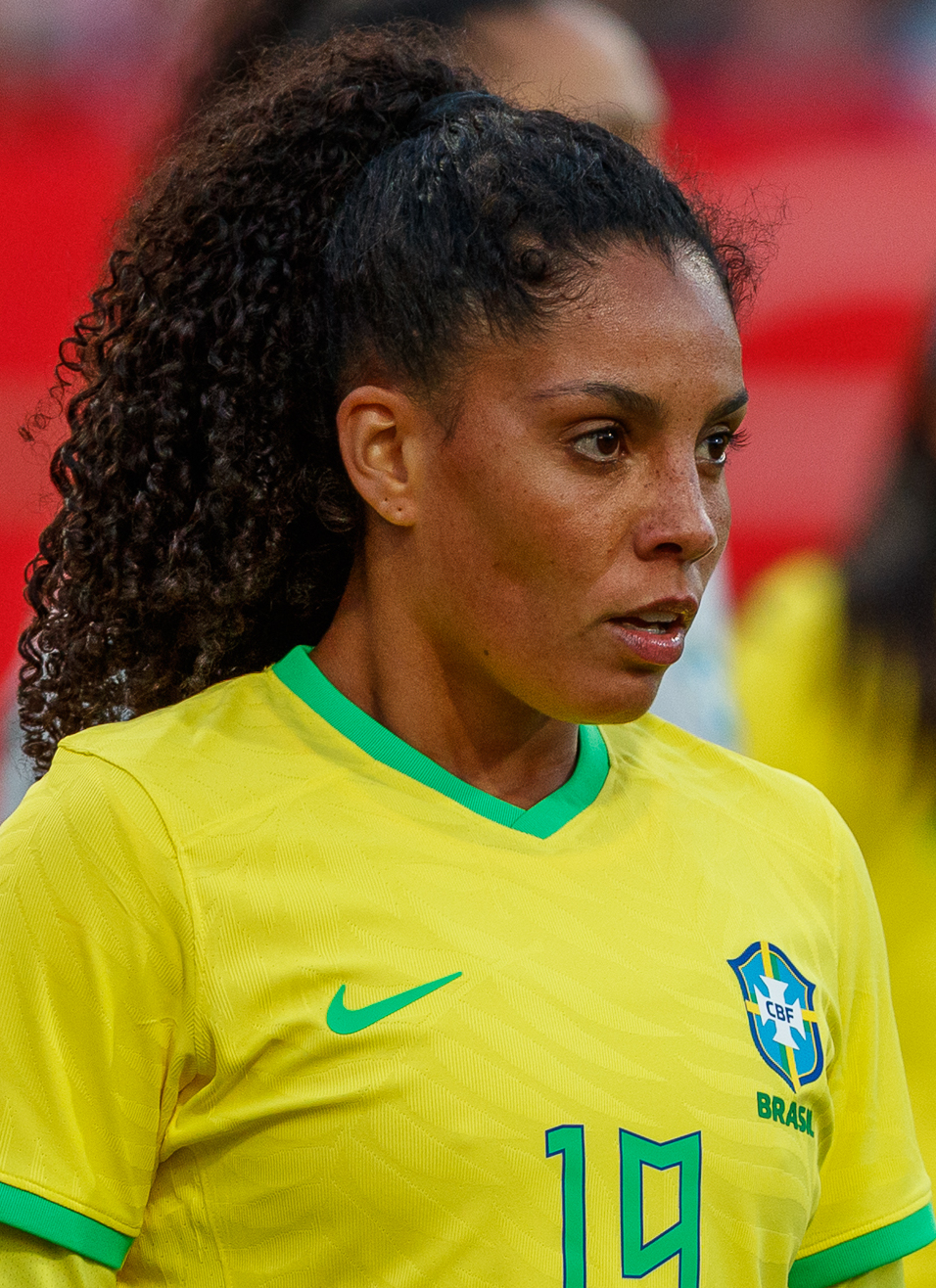
- Yasmim with Brazil in 2023

Personal information
- Full name: Yasmim Assis Ribeiro
- Date of birth: 28 October 1996 (age 30)
- Place of birth: Governador Valadares, Minas Gerais, Brazil
- Position: Defender

Senior career*
Years	Team	Apps	(Gls)
2014–2016	São José	24	(3)
2017–2018	Corinthians	31	(1)
2018–2019	Benfica	25	(12)
2020–2024	Corinthians	68	(7)
2025–2026	Real Madrid	25	(0)

International career^{‡}
2014–2016	Brazil U20	4+	(2+)
2021–	Brazil	13	(3)
Medal record
Women's football
Representing Brazil
Copa América Femenina
Gold medal – first place	2025 Ecuador
Olympic Games
Silver medal – second place	2024 Paris
- * Club domestic league appearances and goals as of 02:05, 7 May 2026 (UTC) ‡ National team caps and goals as of 02:05, 1 May 2024 (UTC)

Yasmim Assis Ribeiro (born 28 October 1996) is a Brazilian professional footballer who plays as a defender for the Brazil women's national team.

== Club career ==
Yasmim made her league debut against Ferroviária on 10 September 2014. She scored her first league goal against Vasco da Gama on 1 October 2014, scoring in the 32nd minute.

Yasmim made her league debut for Corinthians against São Francisco on 12 March 2017. She scored her first league goal against Rio Preto on 27 October 2018, scoring in the 7th minute. Yasmim's performances saw her win the Brasileirão 2018 award at left back.

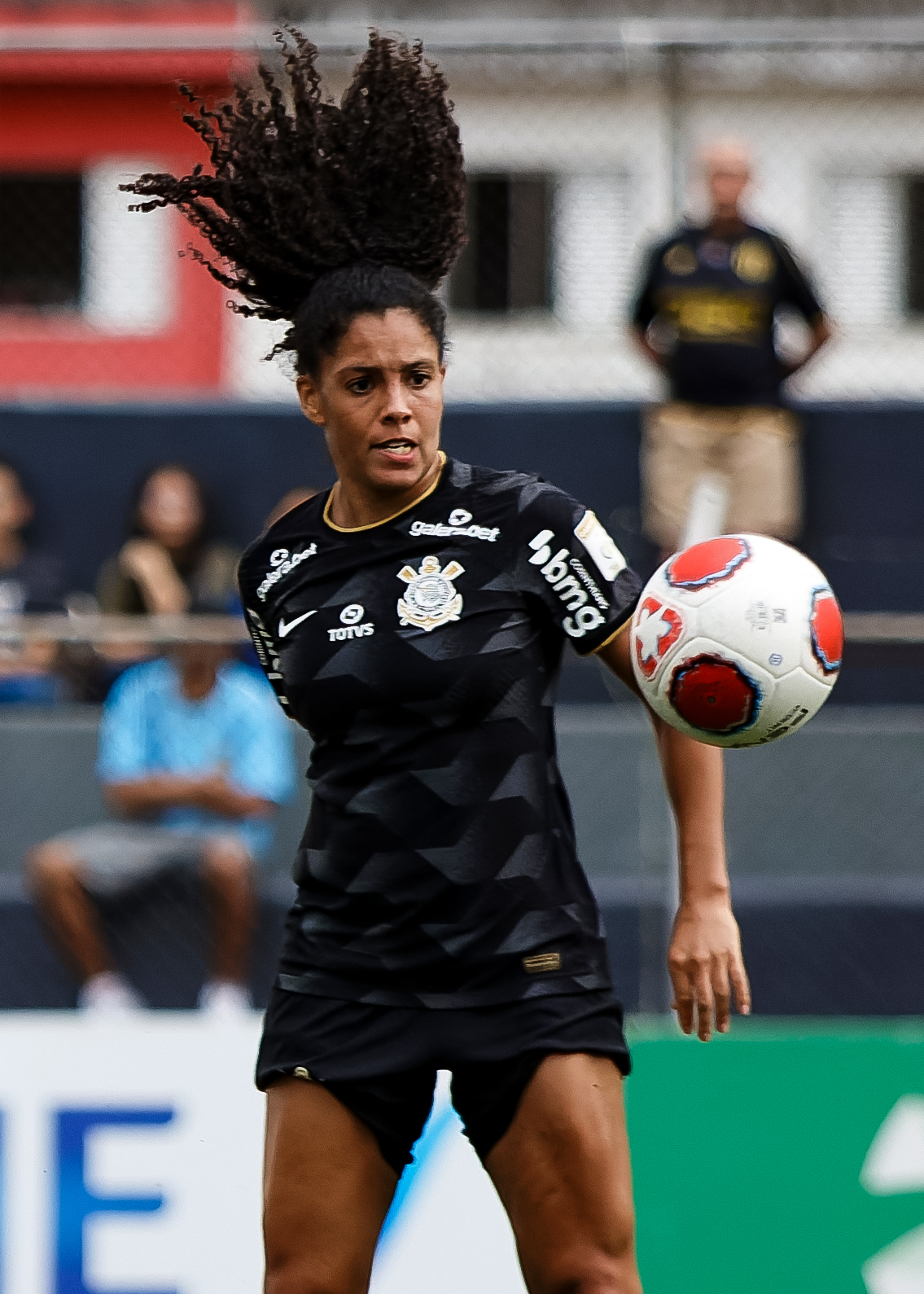
Yasmim with Corinthians in 2022

After scoring 17 goals in 37 appearances for Portuguese club Benfica, Yasmim returned to Brazil to play for Corinthians again in August 2020. She made her league debut against SC Internacional on 10 September 2020. Yasmim scored her first league goal against EC Vitória on 26 September 2020, scoring in the 58th minute.

On 2 January 2025, Yamim signed with Spanish club Real Madrid. She spent one-and-a-half years in Madrid before departing from the club on a mutual contract termination in June 2026.

== International career ==
Yasmim was called up to the Brazil U20s in August 2015. She scored on her U20 debut against Papua New Guinea U20s on 13 November 2016, scoring in the 45th and 66th minute.

Yasmim made her debut for the Brazil national team on 20 September 2021 against Argentina, coming on as a substitute for Tamires and scoring a goal in the second half of the match.

On 1 February 2024, Yasmim was called up to the Brazil squad for the 2024 CONCACAF W Gold Cup. On 2 July 2024, Yasmim was called up to the Brazil squad for the 2024 Summer Olympics.

== Career statistics ==
=== International goals ===
Goal	Date	Location	Opponent	Score	Result	Competition
1	2021-09-20	João Pessoa, Brazil	Argentina	4–1	4–1	Friendly
2	2024-03-02	Los Angeles, United States	Argentina	2–0	5–1	2024 CONCACAF W Gold Cup
3	2024-03-06	San Diego, United States	Mexico	3–0	3–0	2024 CONCACAF W Gold Cup
4	2025-07-23	Quito, Ecuador	Paraguay	1–0	4–1	2025 Copa América Femenina
5	2025-07-23	Quito, Ecuador	Paraguay	2–0	4–1	2025 Copa América Femenina
6	2026-04-14	Cuiabá, Brazil	Zambia	1–0	6–1	2026 FIFA Series

== Honours ==
Brazil

- Summer Olympics silver medal (1): 2024
- Copa América Femenina — Winner (1): 2025
- CONCACAF W Gold Cup — runner-up (1): 2024

Individual

- CONCACAF W Gold Cup — Best XI (1): 2024
- Prêmio Craque do Brasileirão — Team of the Year (1): 2021
- Bola de Prata (Brazil) (2): 2021, 2023
