= 2024 SheBelieves Cup =

Tournament details
- Host country: United States
- Dates: April 6–9
- Teams: 4 (from 3 confederations)
- Venues: 2 (in 2 host cities)

Final positions
- Champions: United States (7th title)
- Runners-up: Canada
- Third place: Brazil
- Fourth place: Japan

Tournament statistics
- Matches played: 4
- Goals scored: 11 (2.75 per match)
- Attendance: 132,338 (33,085 per match)
- Top scorer(s): (Canada) Adriana Leon (United States) Sophia Smith (2 goals each)
- Best player: (United States) Sophia Smith

The 2024 SheBelieves Cup, named the 2024 SheBelieves Cup Presented by Visa for sponsorship reasons, was the ninth edition of the SheBelieves Cup, an invitational women's soccer tournament held in the United States. Featuring national teams from Brazil, Canada, Japan, and the United States, the tournament was held from April 6 to 9, 2024.

The United States emerged as champions, their fifth consecutive win at the SheBelieves Cup and seventh overall, beating second-place Canada in a seven-round penalty shootout after a 2–2 draw in regulation time. Brazil won the third-place game in a penalty shootout after a 1–1 draw, while Japan finished fourth.

== Format ==
Due to the change in FIFA window and scheduling of the CONCACAF W Gold Cup, the format for this tournament format was different from previous years. The four invited teams played in a four-game format that consisted of two semi-finals followed by a third-place game and a final. Each game lasted the usual 90 minutes, followed immediately by a penalty shoot-out in the case of a tie.

== Venues ==
The USSF installed grass at Mercedes-Benz Stadium, which hosted the semi-finals and will also be used for the 2026 FIFA World Cup. The third-place match and final took place at Lower.com Field.

Atlanta, Georgia	Columbus, Ohio
Mercedes-Benz Stadium	Lower.com Field
Capacity: 42,500	Capacity: 20,371
2024 SheBelieves Cup is located in the United States

== Teams ==
Team	FIFA Ranking (March 2024)
United States	4
Japan	7
Canada	9
Brazil	10

== Bracket ==
Semi-finals
April 6 – Atlanta, Georgia
United States	2
Japan	1
April 6 – Atlanta, Georgia
Brazil	1 (2)
Canada (p)	1 (4)

Final
April 9 – Columbus, Ohio
United States (p)	2 (5)
Canada	2 (4)
Third place
April 9 – Columbus, Ohio
Japan	1 (0)
Brazil (p)	1 (3)

== Results ==
All times are local. (UTC−4)

=== Semifinals ===
April 6, 2024
12:30

United States	2–1	Japan
Shaw 21'; Horan 77' (pen.)	Report	Seike 1'

Mercedes-Benz Stadium, Atlanta, Georgia
Attendance: 50,644
Referee: Myriam Marcotte (Canada)

April 6, 2024
15:30

Brazil	1–1	Canada
Tarciane 22' (pen.)	Report	Gilles 77'
Penalties
Marta (penalty missed); Cristiane (penalty scored); Antônia (penalty missed); Tarciane (penalty scored)	2–4	(penalty missed) Lawrence; (penalty scored) Leon; (penalty scored) J. Rose; (penalty scored) Awujo; (penalty scored) Grosso

Mercedes-Benz Stadium, Atlanta, Georgia
Attendance: 50,644
Referee: Tori Penso (United States)

=== Third place match ===
April 9, 2024
16:00

Japan	1–1	Brazil
Tanaka 35'	Report	Cristiane 71'
Penalties
Seike (penalty missed); Nagano (penalty missed); Hasegawa (penalty missed)	0–3	(penalty scored) Cristiane; (penalty scored) Tarciane; (penalty scored) Angelina

Lower.com Field, Columbus, Ohio
Attendance: 12,001
Referee: Danielle Chesky (United States)

=== Final ===
April 9, 2024
19:00

United States	2–2	Canada
Smith 50', 68'	Report	Leon 40', 86' (pen.)
Penalties
Rodman (penalty missed); Smith (penalty scored); Naeher (penalty scored); Horan (penalty scored); Sonnett (penalty missed); Dahlkemper (penalty scored); Fox (penalty scored)	5–4	(penalty scored) Fleming; (penalty scored) Leon; (penalty missed) J. Rose; (penalty missed) Lacasse; (penalty scored) Grosso; (penalty scored) Lawrence; (penalty missed) Viens

Lower.com Field, Columbus, Ohio
Attendance: 19,049
Referee: Crystal Sobers (Trinidad and Tobago)

== Goalscorers ==
There were 11 goals scored in 4 matches, for an average of 2.75 goals per match.

2 goals

- (Canada) Adriana Leon
- (United States) Sophia Smith

1 goal

- (Brazil) Cristiane
- (Brazil) Tarciane
- (Canada) Vanessa Gilles
- (Japan) Kiko Seike
- (Japan) Mina Tanaka
- (United States) Lindsey Horan
- (United States) Jaedyn Shaw

== Honors ==
Most Valuable Player: (United States) Sophia Smith

Woman of the Match (Final): (United States) Alyssa Naeher

== See also ==
- 2024 Pinatar Cup
- 2024 Turkish Women's Cup
