= Jaedyn Shaw =

American soccer player (born 2004)

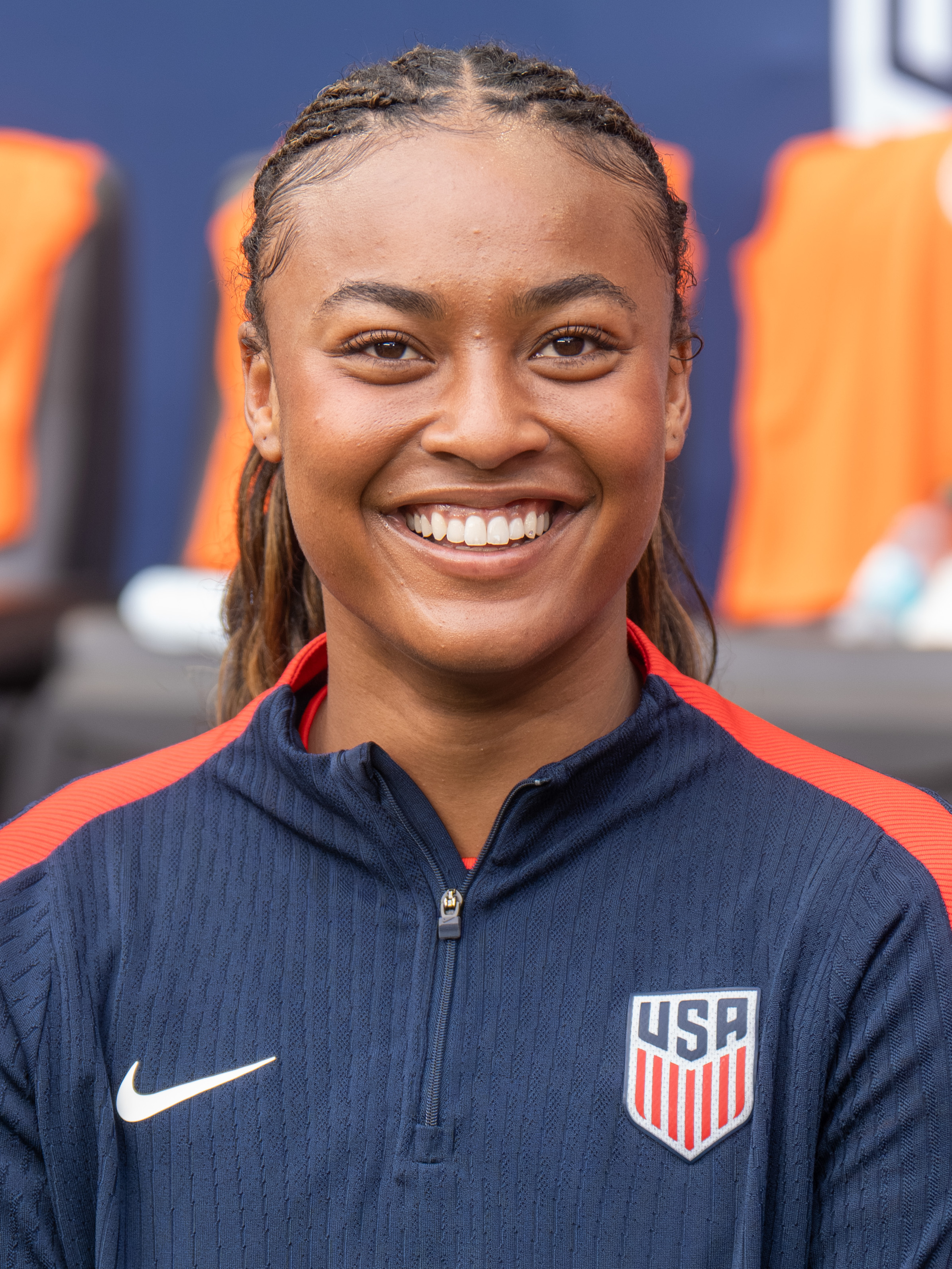
- Shaw with the United States in 2026

Personal information
- Full name: Jaedyn Reese Shaw
- Date of birth: November 20, 2004 (age 21)
- Place of birth: Frisco, Texas, United States
- Height: 5 ft 6 in (1.68 m)
- Positions: Forward; attacking midfielder

Team information
- Current team: Gotham FC
- Number: 10

Youth career
- FC Dallas
- Solar SC

Senior career*
| Years | Team | Apps | (Gls) |
| 2022–2024 | San Diego Wave | 52 | (13) |
| 2025 | North Carolina Courage | 19 | (3) |
| 2025– | Gotham FC | 32 | (11) |

International career^{‡}
| 2018–2019 | United States U15 | 6 | (2) |
| 2022 | United States U20 | 6 | (2) |
| 2025– | United States U23 | 1 | (0) |
| 2023– | United States | 37 | (10) |
Medal record
Women's soccer
Representing the United States
Olympic Games
| Gold medal – first place | 2024 Paris | Team |
CONCACAF W Gold Cup
| Winner | 2024 United States |
- * Club domestic league appearances and goals as of November 1, 2026 ‡ National team caps and goals as of June 6, 2026

Jaedyn Reese Shaw (born November 20, 2004) is an American professional soccer player who plays as a forward or attacking midfielder for Gotham FC of the National Women's Soccer League (NWSL) and the United States national team.

Shaw signed with the San Diego Wave at age 17 in 2022, becoming the NWSL's second-youngest player at the time. In 2023, she helped the club win the NWSL Shield and was named to the NWSL Best XI. After three seasons in San Diego, she moved to the North Carolina Courage before joining Gotham FC in a record intraleague trade, winning the 2025 NWSL Championship in her first season with the Bats.

After representing the United States on the under-17, under-19 and under-20 teams, she made her senior debut in 2023. She won gold with the team at the 2024 Paris Olympics. She was named the U.S. Soccer Young Female Player of the Year in 2022.

== Early life ==
Born and raised in Frisco, Texas, Shaw, her older sister, and younger brother were born to their Vietnamese-born mother, Ann and Black father, Lance. As a two-year-old, she would try playing while attending her older sister's games.

Jaedyn had goals of becoming a professional soccer player from a young age. Her parents sacrificed a lot in order to support Jaedyn's goal. Her mother noted, "Just being really transparent, there was a year or two where all four of us lived in a one bedroom apartment to be able to afford for her to go out of town, out of state, out of the country. My husband and I set our lives on the backburner - no vacations, no honeymoon, no nothing - in order for us to be able to handle the financial burdens that came with the opportunity. I knew this was God's purpose for her so a lot of it, as well, came with trainers, elite trainers, that charged us nothing because they knew she was so special. They knew that she would eventually build their business rather than take away from it. It was a mix of a lot of people's kindness and a mix of our sacrifices, financially." For part of her youth, she lived two blocks away from Toyota Stadium where the United States Soccer Hall of Fame resides and FC Dallas plays and has many memories of the stadium.

Shaw played for ECNL club Solar SC from age five to eight. She later played for FC Dallas’ youth academy team and helped the club win the under-15 championship in 2018. Shaw also played futsal and credits it for a lot of growth in her game, "I played strictly futsal until I was pushing maybe 12. I think that it helped me a lot technically and being able to see the game differently."

== Club career ==
=== Early career ===
In April 2019, at the age of 14, Shaw verbally committed to joining the Tar Heels of the University of North Carolina at Chapel Hill starting in the 2024 season. At the age of 15, Shaw was also invited to train with the French first-division club, Paris Saint-Germain. At the youth level, she played for FC Dallas and Solar SC. In 2022, Shaw was rated as the second ranked top prospect for the high school class of 2023 by Top Drawer Soccer.

In spring 2022, she joined Washington Spirit for pre-season and was named in the club's initial preseason roster.

=== San Diego Wave ===
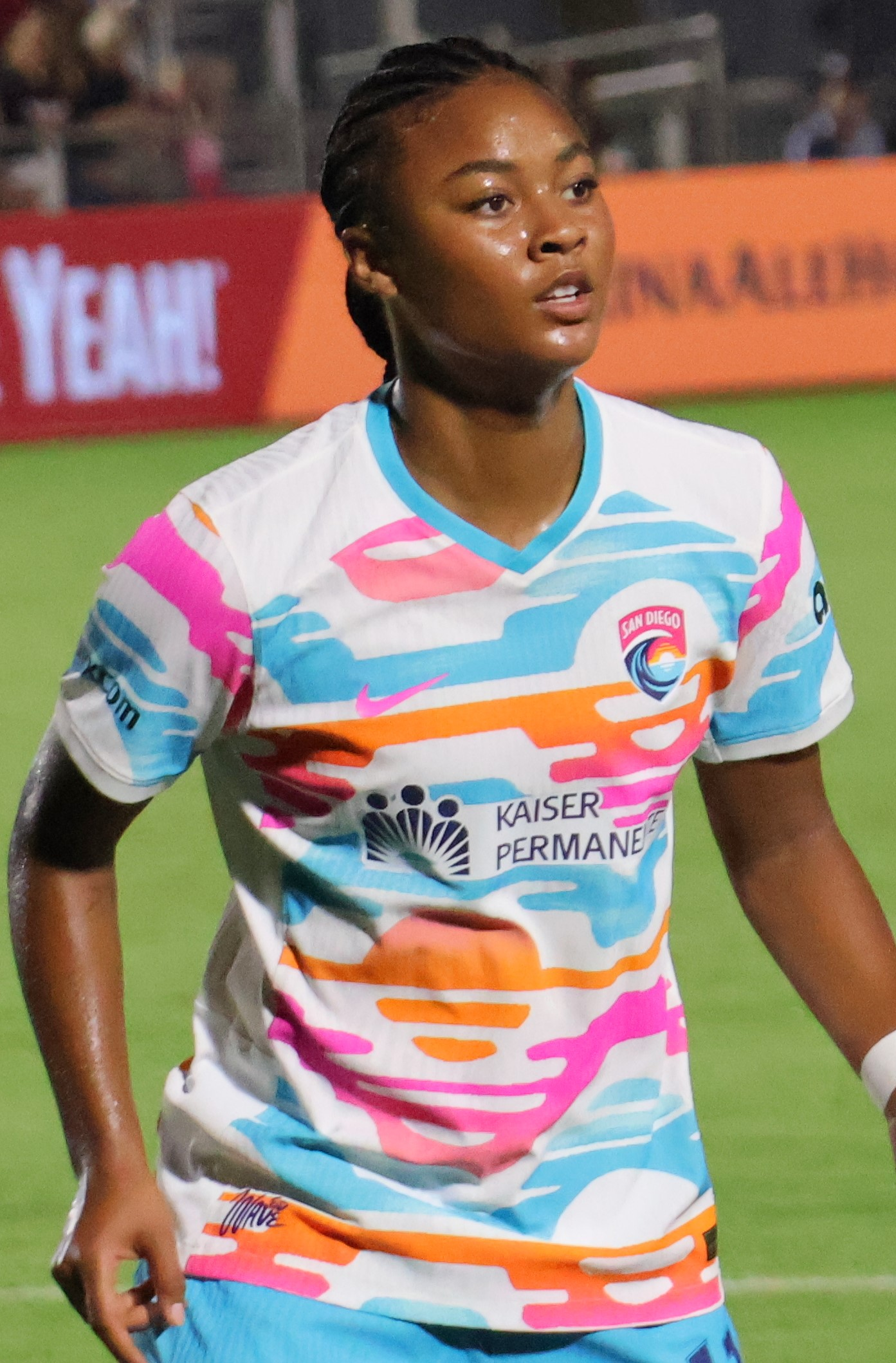
Shaw with the San Diego Wave in 2024

In July 2022, Shaw signed for National Women's Soccer League (NWSL) club San Diego Wave FC after she was permitted to enter the NWSL through a discovery process which allowed for an amendment of the leagues age restrictions.

Thirteen days after signing with the club, on July 30, Shaw started the Wave's NWSL match against Chicago Red Stars. She was the second-youngest player to compete in NWSL at the time at the age of 17 years, eight months. After scoring the game winner for her team in the 27th minute, she became the youngest NWSL player to score in their debut. Shaw went on to score goals against the Washington Spirit and Angel City in September, bringing her tally to three goals in three matches. She became the second player in NWSL history to score in each of their first three league appearances. Shaw finished off her first season with 3 goals in 7 matches.

In August 2023, Shaw signed a multi-year contract with the Wave through the 2026 season. During the 2023 season, Shaw scored the most goals as a teenager in NWSL history and helped the Wave win its first-ever NWSL Shield.

=== North Carolina Courage ===
On January 14, 2025, Shaw was traded to the North Carolina Courage for $300,000 in allocation money, $150,000 in intraleague transfer fees, and an international spot in the 2025 and 2026 seasons, with potential further add-ons. She had previously trained with the NC Courage Academy under now head coach Sean Nahas, who advocated for the signing. On March 15, she made her Courage debut on the first day of the season in a 1–1 draw with Racing Louisville, also her 50th career regular-season appearance. Despite expectations for Shaw to combine well with teammates Ashley Sanchez and Manaka Matsukubo, she struggled to adjust to the new club and was rotated in and out of the starting lineup. On June 21, she came off the bench to score her first Courage goal, equalizing in a 2–1 win over the Houston Dash. On September 6, a month after Nahas was fired, she played her last game for the Courage, scoring a penalty in a 1–1 draw with the Utah Royals. She made 19 appearances and scored 3 goals for the club.

=== Gotham FC ===
On September 11, 2025, Shaw was traded to Gotham FC for $1.25m in intraleague transfer fees, setting a new intraleague transfer record. She made a goalscoring debut the next day in a 2–0 win over former club San Diego Wave. On November 9, she recorded a goal and an assist in the playoff quarterfinals, lifting Gotham to a 2–1 win over NWSL Shield champions Kansas City Current in extra time. In the semifinals, she scored a bouncing free kick in the last seconds to secure a 1–0 win over the defending champion Orlando Pride. She became an NWSL champion after Gotham won 1–0 against the Washington Spirit in the final, becoming the first eight seed to win the championship.

On November 1, 2026, the last day of the season, Shaw scored the second goal in a 2–0 victory over the Utah Royals as Gotham secured their first NWSL Shield, Shaw's second.

== International career ==
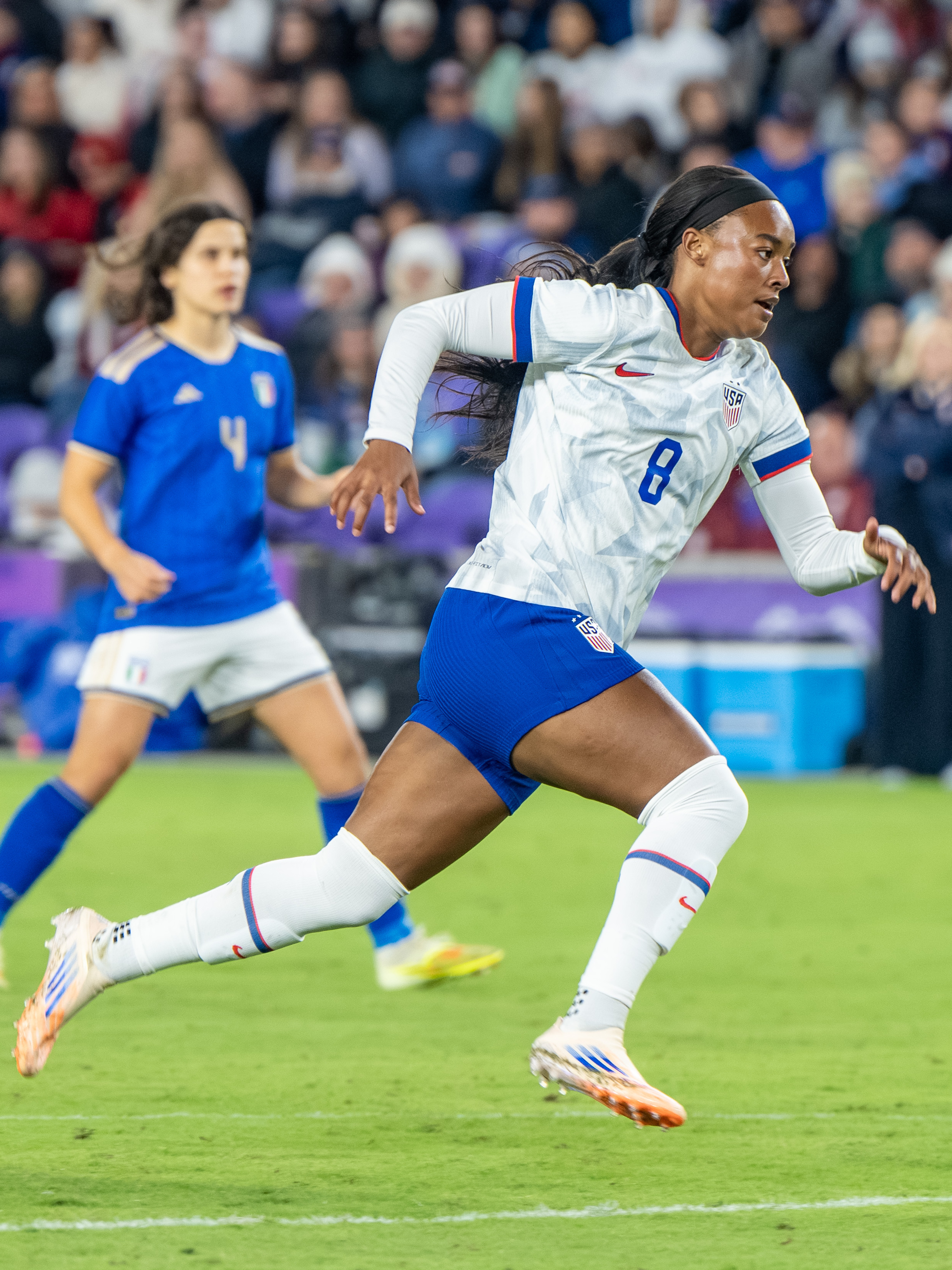
Shaw with the United States in 2025

Shaw was part of the U-15 team at the CONCACAF Girls' Under-15 Championship in 2018. She played a key role in helping the team to the title and winning the golden ball award as the best player of the tournament. She scored two goals in the final of the tournament leading the team to a 3–0 victory over Mexico.

In early 2020, Shaw became a starter for the U-20, where she scored two goals in three matches to help the squad to win the Sud Ladies Cup in Aubagne, France. Afterwards, Shaw was named to the USA U-20 roster for the 2022 FIFA U-20 Women's World Cup. She was one of two NWSL players to play for the U20 USWNT in the U20 World Cup.

Shaw received her first call up to the senior team in September 2023 and made her debut a month later on October 26, 2023, in a friendly against Colombia in Sandy, Utah. A few days later, she scored her first goal for the USWNT in San Diego, California, in her second cap on October 29, 2023, in another friendly against Colombia which ended in a 3–0 victory. She scored her second goal in her hometown of Frisco, Texas a month later on December 5, 2023, which was a game winner in a comeback against China that finished as a 2–1 victory.

Shaw was named to the 23-player roster for the inaugural 2024 CONCACAF W Gold Cup. During the tournament Shaw played in all 6 matches and scored 4 goals, becoming the first player in the USWNT's history to score in their first four starts for the team. Her performance earned her the Golden Ball, given to the best player of the tournament as the USWNT defeated Brazil 1–0 in the final and lifted the first Gold Cup in San Diego on March 10, 2023.

On March 26, 2024, Shaw was called up for the 2024 SheBelieves Cup and scored the first goal, an equalizer in a 2–1 comeback victory against Japan on April 6, 2024, extending her record to become the first player to score in their first five starts. Shaw also started the final against Canada who the team defeated after a penalty shootout to win their 7th title at the SheBelieves Cup.

On June 26, 2024, Shaw was named to the United States roster for the 2024 Summer Olympics. The United States defeated Brazil 1–0 in the Olympic final on a goal from Mallory Swanson.

== Style of play ==
Shaw has played across all attacking roles, including as a winger, center forward, and attacking midfielder, and prefers to play as a forward. She is known for seeking and recognizing openings to receive the ball and for her creativity under pressure, possessing both the physical strength and technical control to protect possession as well as the agility to turn defenders. Her signature move is to drag the ball back under her foot to force defenders off balance. Shaw is also an ambidextrous passer. For the Wave under Casey Stoney, Shaw has featured as a hybrid 10 or as a center forward capable of rotating to either wing with Sofia Jakobsson. For Gotham FC, she has played as a winger or an attacking midfielder role alongside teammate Rose Lavelle.

== Personal life ==
Shaw's father and mother are Black and Vietnamese respectively. She is the first Vietnamese-American to ever represent the United States Women's National Team.

== Career statistics ==
=== Club ===
As of May 25, 2026

Appearances and goals by club, season and competition
| Club | Season | League | | | Cup (Note: Includes the NWSL Challenge Cup) | | Playoffs (Note: Includes NWSL Playoffs) | | Continental (Note: Includes CONCACAF W Champions Cup) | | Other | | Total | |
| Club | Season | Division | Apps | Goals | Apps | Goals | Apps | Goals | Apps | Goals | Apps | Goals | Apps | Goals |
|---|---|---|---|---|---|---|---|---|---|---|---|---|---|---|
| San Diego Wave FC | 2022 | NWSL | 5 | 3 | 0 | 0 | 2 | 0 | — | | — | | 7 | 3 |
| San Diego Wave FC | 2023 | NWSL | 22 | 6 | 6 | 1 | 1 | 0 | — | | — | | 29 | 7 |
| San Diego Wave FC | 2024 | NWSL | 22 | 4 | 1 | 0 | — | | 2 | 0 | 0 (Note: Includes NWSL x Liga MX Femenil Summer Cup) | 0 | 25 | 4 |
| North Carolina Courage | 2025 | NWSL | 9 | 0 | — | | — | | — | | — | | 9 | 0 |
| Gotham FC | 2025 | NWSL | 7 | 1 | — | | 3 | 2 | — | | — | | 10 | 3 |
| Gotham FC | 2026 | NWSL | 26 | 11 | 0 | 0 | 0 | 0 | 4 | 0 | 2 | 1 | 27 | 11 |
| Career total | | | 91 | 25 | 7 | 1 | 6 | 2 | 2 | 0 | 0 | 0 | 113 | 29 |

=== International ===
As of match played June 6, 2026

Appearances and goals by national team and year
| National team | Year | Apps | Goals |
|---|---|---|---|
| United States | 2023 | 4 | 2 |
| United States | 2024 | 17 | 6 |
| United States | 2025 | 10 | 1 |
| United States | 2026 | 6 | 1 |
| Total | | 37 | 10 |

Scores and results list United States's goal tally first, score column indicates score after each Shaw goal.

List of international goals scored by Jaedyn Shaw
| No. | Date | Venue | Opponent | Score | Result | Competition | Ref. |
|---|---|---|---|---|---|---|---|
| 1 | October 29, 2023 | San Diego, California | Colombia | 3–0 | 3–0 | Friendly | |
| 2 | December 5, 2023 | Frisco, Texas | China | 2–1 | 2–1 | Friendly | |
| 3 | February 23, 2024 | Carson, California | Argentina | 1–0 | 4–0 | 2024 CONCACAF W Gold Cup | |
| 4 | February 23, 2024 | Carson, California | Argentina | 2–0 | 4–0 | 2024 CONCACAF W Gold Cup | |
| 5 | March 3, 2024 | Los Angeles, California | Colombia | 3–0 | 3–0 | 2024 CONCACAF W Gold Cup | |
| 6 | March 6, 2024 | San Diego, California | Canada | 1–0 | 2–2 | 2024 CONCACAF W Gold Cup | |
| 7 | April 6, 2024 | Atlanta, Georgia | Japan | 1–1 | 2–1 | 2024 SheBelieves Cup | |
| 8 | October 24, 2024 | Austin, Texas | Iceland | 2–1 | 3–1 | Friendly | |
| 9 | December 1, 2025 | Fort Lauderdale, Florida | Italy | 2–0 | 2–0 | Friendly | |
| 10 | March 1, 2026 | Nashville, Tennessee | Argentina | 2–0 | 2–0 | 2026 SheBelieves Cup | |

== Honors ==
San Diego Wave

- NWSL Shield: 2023
- NWSL Challenge Cup: 2024

Gotham FC

- NWSL Championship: 2025
- NWSL Shield: 2026
- NWSL Challenge Cup: 2026

United States U15

- CONCACAF Girls' Under-15 Championship: 2018

United States U20

- Sud Ladies Cup: 2022

United States

- Summer Olympic Games Gold Medal: 2024
- CONCACAF W Gold Cup: 2024
- SheBelieves Cup: 2024, 2026

Individual

- CONCACAF Girls' Under-15 Championship Golden Ball: 2018
- Sud Ladies Cup Best XI: 2022
- US Soccer Young Female Player of the Year: 2022
- NWSL Best XI: 2023
- CONCACAF W Gold Cup Golden Ball: 2024
- CONCACAF W Gold Cup Best XI: 2024
