= 2024 CONCACAF W Gold Cup =

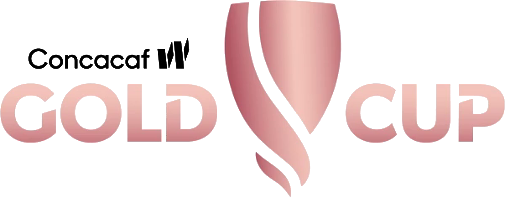
- Our Legacy, Our Cup

Tournament details
- Host country: United States
- Dates: February 20 – March 10
- Teams: 12 (from 2 confederations)
- Venues: 4 (in 4 host cities)

Final positions
- Champions: United States (1st title)
- Runners-up: Brazil

Tournament statistics
- Matches played: 25
- Goals scored: 84 (3.36 per match)
- Attendance: 123,018 (4,921 per match)
- Top scorer(s): (Canada) Adriana Leon (6 goals)
- Best player: (United States) Jaedyn Shaw
- Best young player: (Canada) Olivia Smith
- Best goalkeeper: (United States) Alyssa Naeher
- Fair play award: United States

The 2024 CONCACAF W Gold Cup was the inaugural edition of the CONCACAF W Gold Cup, an international women's soccer competition contested by the senior women's national teams of the member associations of CONCACAF. The tournament was contested by twelve teams from February 20 to March 10, 2024 in the United States. Eight CONCACAF national teams qualified for the tournament, joined by four guest teams from CONMEBOL.

The hosts United States won the inaugural W Gold Cup title by defeating Brazil 1-0 in the final. The match was played at Snapdragon Stadium in San Diego, California, on March 10.

== Format ==
On December 10, 2020, the CONCACAF Council approved the structure and calendar of the competition. The qualification competition, known as the "Road to Concacaf W Gold Cup", began with the group stage, featuring 33 women's national teams of CONCACAF split into three leagues (A, B and C). Each league featured three groups, containing three teams each in League A, and four teams each in Leagues B and C. The teams in each group played against each other home-and-away in a round-robin format. The top three teams in League A qualified directly for the W Gold Cup. The group runners-up of League A and the League B group winners participated in a play-in in April 2024 to compete for the final three spots at the W Gold Cup. The two CONCACAF women's national teams that qualified for the Summer Olympics in 2024 (the United States and Canada) received a bye directly to the W Gold Cup, skipping qualification.

The final tournament was held from February 20 to March 10, 2024. Originally, CONCACAF announced the tournament would be played in June 2024, the month prior to the start of the 2024 Olympic women's soccer tournament, but on March 8, 2023, announced it would be moved up to February and March. The W Gold Cup featured twelve teams, including the two teams that qualified for the Summer Olympics, the six teams that qualified from the group stage and play-in, and four guest national teams from South America. The twelve teams were split into three groups of four that competed in a single round-robin. Eight teams, comprising the top two teams of each group and the two best third-placed teams, advanced to the knockout stage. The knockout stage consisted of quarter-finals, semi-finals and a final to determine the champion.

On January 27, 2023, the United States were confirmed as the tournament hosts. In addition, the top four teams from CONMEBOL's 2022 Copa América Femenina – Brazil, Colombia, Argentina, and Paraguay – were confirmed as guests for the tournament.

== Venues ==
The host cities and stadiums were announced on November 29, 2023.

Location of the host cities of the 2024 CONCACAF W Gold Cup.

- 1 Carson, CA
- 2 Houston, TX
- 3 Los Angeles, CA
- 4 San Diego, CA

List of host cities and stadiums
San Diego, California	Carson, California (Los Angeles Area)
Snapdragon Stadium	Dignity Health Sports Park
Capacity: 35,000	Capacity: 30,510
Houston, Texas	Los Angeles, California
Shell Energy Stadium	BMO Stadium
Capacity: 22,039	Capacity: 22,000

== Qualification ==
The league stage of qualification took place in September through December 2023, while the play-in took place in February 2024.

=== Qualified teams ===
Team	Method of qualification	Date of qualification	FIFA ranking at start of event
United States (host)	2022 CONCACAF W Championship winner	July 18, 2022	2
Canada	CONCACAF Olympic play-off winner	September 26, 2023	10
Mexico	Qualification League A Group A winner	December 1, 2023	35
Panama	Qualification League A Group B winner	December 3, 2023	55
Costa Rica	Qualification League A Group C winner	December 4, 2023	43
Puerto Rico	Qualification play-off winner	February 17, 2024	103
El Salvador	Qualification play-off winner	February 17, 2024	104
Dominican Republic	Qualification play-off winner	February 17, 2024	107
Brazil	2022 Copa América Femenina winners	January 27, 2023 (Note: While the semi-finalists of the 2022 Copa América Femenina were confirmed on July 18 (Brazil), July 20 (Colombia and Paraguay) and July 21, 2022 (Argentina), their invitation to participate in the W Gold Cup was not confirmed until January 27, 2023.)	11
Colombia	2022 Copa América Femenina runners-up	January 27, 2023	23
Argentina	2022 Copa América Femenina third place	January 27, 2023	31
Paraguay	2022 Copa América Femenina fourth place	January 27, 2023	50

== Draw ==
The final draw for the tournament took place on December 11, 2023 in Miami, Florida, United States at 7:00 p.m. EST.

Pot 1	Pot 2	Pot 3	Pot 4
United States; Brazil; Canada	Costa Rica; Mexico; Panama	Colombia; Argentina; Paraguay	Puerto Rico (Note: Team was competing in the qualifying play-offs and was not known at the time of the draw); El Salvador; Dominican Republic

== Match officials ==
Referees	Assistant referees	
(Canadian Soccer Association) Marie-Soleil Beaudoin (Canadian Soccer Association) Myriam Marcotte (Costa Rican Football Federation) Marianela Araya (National Football Federation of Guatemala) Astrid Gramajo (National Autonomous Federation of Football of Honduras) Melissa Borjas (Jamaica Football Federation) Odette Hamilton (Mexican Football Federation) Katia García (Mexican Football Federation) Karen Hernández (United States Soccer Federation) Tori Penso (United States Soccer Federation) Natalie Simon	(Canadian Soccer Association) Chantal Boudreau (Canadian Soccer Association) Gabrielle Lemieux (Canadian Soccer Association) Marie-Han Gagnon-Chretien (Canadian Soccer Association) Melissa Snedden (Football Association of Cuba) Ivett Santiago (National Football Federation of Guatemala) Sherly Socop (National Football Federation of Guatemala) Iris Vail (National Autonomous Federation of Football of Honduras) Shirley Perelló (National Autonomous Federation of Football of Honduras) Lourdes Noriega (Jamaica Football Federation) Stephanie-Dale Yee Sing	(Mexican Football Federation) Enedina Caudillo (Mexican Football Federation) Karen Díaz (Mexican Football Federation) Jéssica Morales (Mexican Football Federation) Sandra Ramírez (Surinamese Football Association) Mijensa Rensch (Trinidad and Tobago Football Association) Carissa Douglas-Jacob (United States Soccer Federation) Felisha Mariscal (United States Soccer Federation) Brooke Mayo (United States Soccer Federation) Meghan Mullen (United States Soccer Federation) Kathryn Nesbitt

Video assistant referee (VAR)

(Canadian Soccer Association) Drew Fischer
(Costa Rican Football Federation) Ricardo Montero
(Costa Rican Football Federation) Benjamín Pineda
(Jamaica Football Federation) Daneon Parchment
(Mexican Football Federation) Lizzet García
(Mexican Football Federation) Francia González
(Mexican Football Federation) Diana Pérez
(Nicaraguan Football Federation) Tatiana Guzmán
(United States Soccer Federation) Ekaterina Koroleva

Support referees

(Canadian Soccer Association) Carly Shaw-MacLaren
(Salvadoran Football Federation) Sandra Benítez
(National Football Federation of Guatemala) Mayary Cartagena
(National Autonomous Federation of Football of Honduras) Merlin Soto
(Mexican Football Federation) Priscila Pérez
(Trinidad and Tobago Football Association) Crystal Sobers

== Group stage ==
=== Tiebreakers ===
The teams were ranked according to points (3 points for a win, 1 point for a draw, and 0 points for a loss). If tied on points, the following criteria were used to determine the ranking:

1. Goal difference in all group matches;
2. Number of goals scored in all group matches;
3. If two or more teams were equal on the basis of the above criteria
  1. Points obtained in the matches played between the teams in question;
  2. Goal difference in the matches played between the teams in question;
  3. Number of goals scored in the matches played between the teams in question;
4. Highest-performing in the Fair play ranking;
5. Drawing of lots.

=== Group A ===
Pos	Team	Pld	W	D	L	GF	GA	GD	Pts	Qualification
1	Mexico	3	2	1	0	10	0	+10	7	Advance to knockout stage
2	United States (H)	3	2	0	1	9	2	+7	6	Advance to knockout stage
3	Argentina	3	1	1	1	3	4	−1	4	Advance to knockout stage
4	Dominican Republic	3	0	0	3	0	16	−16	0	

Source: CONCACAF
Rules for classification: Tiebreakers
(H) Hosts
February 20, 2024
19:30 (16:30 UTC−8)

Mexico	0–0	Argentina
	Report

Dignity Health Sports Park, Carson, California
Attendance: 2,521
Referee: Myriam Marcotte (Canada)
February 20, 2024
22:15 (19:15 UTC−8)

United States	5–0	Dominican Republic
Moultrie 8', 58'; Williams 30'; Nighswonger 86' (pen.); Morgan 90+2' (pen.)	Report

Dignity Health Sports Park, Carson, California
Attendance: 3,242
Referee: Astrid Gramajo (Guatemala)

February 23, 2024
19:30 (16:30 UTC−8)

Dominican Republic	0–8	Mexico
	Report	Hernández 12'; Ovalle 14', 27' (pen.); Luna 21'; Bernal 44'; Ordóñez 45+4'; Casarez 70'; Pelayo 90+3'

Dignity Health Sports Park, Carson, California
Attendance: 5,300
Referee: Marianela Araya (Costa Rica)
February 23, 2024
22:15 (19:15 UTC−8)

Argentina	0–4	United States
	Report	Shaw 10', 18'; Morgan 19'; Horan 77' (pen.)

Dignity Health Sports Park, Carson, California
Attendance: 8,315
Referee: Marie-Soleil Beaudoin (Canada)

February 26, 2024
19:00 (16:00 UTC−8)

Argentina	3–0	Dominican Republic
Ippólito 30'; Dos Santos 76'; Pereyra 90+4'	Report

Dignity Health Sports Park, Carson, California
Attendance: 4,100
Referee: Odette Hamilton (Jamaica)
February 26, 2024
22:15 (19:15 UTC−8)

United States	0–2	Mexico
	Report	Ovalle 38'; Pelayo 90+2'

Dignity Health Sports Park, Carson, California
Attendance: 11,612
Referee: Melissa Borjas (Honduras)

=== Group B ===
Pos	Team	Pld	W	D	L	GF	GA	GD	Pts	Qualification
1	Brazil	3	3	0	0	7	0	+7	9	Advance to knockout stage
2	Colombia	3	2	0	1	8	1	+7	6	Advance to knockout stage
3	Puerto Rico	3	1	0	2	2	4	−2	3	
4	Panama	3	0	0	3	1	13	−12	0	

Source: CONCACAF
Rules for classification: Tiebreakers
February 21, 2024
19:30 (16:30 UTC−8)

Panama	0–6	Colombia
	Report	Paví 26', 34'; Usme 36'; Vanegas 72'; Caicedo 84'; Baltrip-Reyes 89' (o.g.)

Snapdragon Stadium, San Diego, California
Attendance: 815
Referee: Katia García (Mexico)
February 21, 2024
22:15 (19:15 UTC−8)

Brazil	1–0	Puerto Rico
Gabi Nunes 81'	Report

Snapdragon Stadium, San Diego, California
Attendance: 935
Referee: Natalie Simon (United States)

February 24, 2024
19:30 (16:30 UTC−8)

Puerto Rico	2–1	Panama
Cox 73'; Marcano 90+3'	Report	Mills 27'

Snapdragon Stadium, San Diego, California
Referee: Karen Hernández (Mexico)
February 24, 2024
22:15 (19:15 UTC−8)

Colombia	0–1	Brazil
	Report	Duda Santos 6'

Snapdragon Stadium, San Diego, California
Attendance: 4,799
Referee: Tori Penso (United States)

February 27, 2024
19:00 (16:00 UTC−8)

Colombia	2–0	Puerto Rico
Usme 16'; Caicedo 53'	Report

Snapdragon Stadium, San Diego, California
Referee: Marie-Soleil Beaudoin (Canada)
February 27, 2024
22:15 (19:15 UTC−8)

Brazil	5–0	Panama
Geyse 4', 74'; Beatriz 10'; Rafaelle 23'; Debinha 51'	Report

Snapdragon Stadium, San Diego, California
Referee: Myriam Marcotte (Canada)

=== Group C ===
Pos	Team	Pld	W	D	L	GF	GA	GD	Pts	Qualification
1	Canada	3	3	0	0	13	0	+13	9	Advance to knockout stage
2	Paraguay	3	2	0	1	4	6	−2	6	Advance to knockout stage
3	Costa Rica	3	1	0	2	2	4	−2	3	Advance to knockout stage
4	El Salvador	3	0	0	3	2	11	−9	0	

Source: CONCACAF
Rules for classification: Tiebreakers
February 22, 2024
18:15 (17:15 UTC−6)

Costa Rica	0–1	Paraguay
	Report	Chamorro 51'

Shell Energy Stadium, Houston, Texas
Referee: Odette Hamilton (Jamaica)
February 22, 2024
21:00 (20:00 UTC−6)

Canada	6–0	El Salvador
Lacasse 3'; Huitema 24'; Leon 28', 59' (pen.); Buchanan 62'; Smith 86'	Report

Shell Energy Stadium, Houston, Texas
Attendance: 4,421
Referee: Melissa Borjas (Honduras)

February 25, 2024
17:00 (16:00 UTC−6)

Paraguay	0–4	Canada
	Report	Leon 25', 49', 57'; Smith 39'

Shell Energy Stadium, Houston, Texas
Attendance: 3,482
Referee: Katia García (Mexico)
February 25, 2024
20:00 (19:00 UTC−6)

El Salvador	0–2	Costa Rica
	Report	Chinchilla 8', 49'

Shell Energy Stadium, Houston, Texas
Attendance: 5,079
Referee: Natalie Simon (United States)

February 28, 2024
18:00 (17:00 UTC−6)

Canada	3–0	Costa Rica
Huitema 11'; Zadorsky 27', 57'	Report

Shell Energy Stadium, Houston, Texas
Referee: Tori Penso (United States)
February 28, 2024
21:00 (20:00 UTC−6)

Paraguay	3–2	El Salvador
J. Martínez 18' (pen.), 86' (pen.), 90+1'	Report	Fisher 69'; Fuentes 83'

Shell Energy Stadium, Houston, Texas
Referee: Karen Hernández (Mexico)

=== Ranking of third-placed teams ===
Pos	Grp	Team	Pld	W	D	L	GF	GA	GD	Pts	Qualification
1	A	Argentina	3	1	1	1	3	4	−1	4	Advance to knockout stage
2	C	Costa Rica	3	1	0	2	2	4	−2	3 (Note: Tied on points, goal difference, goals scored and lowest disciplinary points (+4). Costa Rica were selected over Puerto Rico in a drawing of lots on February 28 by CONCACAF, according to the regulations of the tournament.)	Advance to knockout stage
3	B	Puerto Rico	3	1	0	2	2	4	−2	3	

Source: CONCACAF
Rules for classification: 1) Points; 2) Goal difference; 3) Goals scored; 4) Fair play ranking; 5) Drawing of lots.

== Knockout stage ==
=== Format ===
Starting from the quarter-finals, the teams played a single-elimination tournament with the following rules:

- If tied, extra time was played.
  - If extra time was played, each team was allowed to make an extra substitution.
- If the score was still tied after extra time, a penalty shoot-out was used to determine the winners.

=== Ranking of qualified teams ===
The top two teams from each group and the two best third-place teams advanced to the quarter-finals. The bracket was decided by means of a ranking based on the standings of the eight teams in the group stage, as follows: 1−8, 2−7, 3−6, 4−5.

Seed	Grp	Team	Pld	W	D	L	GF	GA	GD	Pts
1	C	Canada	3	3	0	0	13	0	+13	9
2	B	Brazil	3	3	0	0	7	0	+7	9
3	A	Mexico	3	2	1	0	10	0	+10	7
4	A	United States	3	2	0	1	9	2	+7	6
5	B	Colombia	3	2	0	1	8	1	+7	6
6	C	Paraguay	3	2	0	1	4	6	−2	6
7	A	Argentina	3	1	1	1	3	4	−1	4
8	C	Costa Rica	3	1	0	2	2	4	−2	3

Source: CONCACAF
Rules for classification: 1) Points; 2) Goal difference; 3) Goals scored; 4) Fair play ranking; 5) Drawing of lots.

=== Bracket ===
Quarter-finals
March 2 – Los Angeles, CA
1 Canada (a.e.t.)	1
8 Costa Rica	0
March 3 – Los Angeles, CA
4 United States	3
5 Colombia	0
March 2 – Los Angeles, CA
2 Brazil	5
7 Argentina	1
March 3 – Los Angeles, CA
3 Mexico	3
6 Paraguay	2

Semi-finals
March 6 – San Diego, CA
1 Canada	2 (1)
4 United States (p)	2 (3)
March 6 – San Diego, CA
2 Brazil	3
3 Mexico	0

Final
March 10 – San Diego, CA
4 United States	1
2 Brazil	0

=== Quarter-finals ===
March 2, 2024
19:00 (16:00 UTC−8)

Canada	1–0 (a.e.t.)	Costa Rica
Viens 104'	Report

BMO Stadium, Los Angeles, California
Attendance: 2,054
Referee: Odette Hamilton (Jamaica)

March 2, 2024
22:15 (19:15 UTC−8)

Brazil	5–1	Argentina
Yaya 19'; Yasmim 36'; Bia Zaneratto 54', 90+5'; Gabi Nunes 62'	Report	Dos Santos 82'

BMO Stadium, Los Angeles, California
Attendance: 2,824
Referee: Myriam Marcotte (Canada)

March 3, 2024
17:00 (14:00 UTC−8)

Mexico	3–2	Paraguay
Ovalle 31', 69'; Luna 49'	Report	Barbosa 64'; Fernández 72'

BMO Stadium, Los Angeles, California
Referee: Tori Penso (United States)

March 3, 2024
20:15 (17:15 UTC−8)

United States	3–0	Colombia
Horan 13' (pen.); Nighswonger 22'; Shaw 45+2'	Report

BMO Stadium, Los Angeles, California
Attendance: 16,746
Referee: Marianela Araya (Costa Rica)

=== Semi-finals ===
March 6, 2024
19:00 (16:00 UTC−8)

Brazil	3–0	Mexico
Adriana 21'; Antônia 32'; Yasmim 48'	Report

Snapdragon Stadium, San Diego, California
Referee: Tori Penso (United States)

March 6, 2024
22:15 (19:15 UTC−8)

Canada	2–2 (a.e.t.)	United States
Huitema 82'; Leon 120+7' (pen.)	Report	Shaw 20'; Smith 99'
Penalties
Leon (penalty missed); Huitema (penalty missed); Quinn (penalty scored); Fleming (penalty missed)	1–3	(penalty scored) Smith; (penalty missed) Albert; (penalty scored) Naeher; (penalty scored) Horan

Snapdragon Stadium, San Diego, California
Attendance: 15,245
Referee: Katia García (Mexico)

=== Final ===
March 10, 2024
20:15 (17:15 UTC−8)

United States	1–0	Brazil
Horan 45+1'	Report

Snapdragon Stadium, San Diego, California
Attendance: 31,528
Referee: Melissa Borjas (Honduras)

2024 CONCACAF W Gold Cup champions

United States
1st title

== Awards ==
The following players and team earned top distinctions:

Golden Ball	Golden Boot	Golden Glove
(United States) Jaedyn Shaw	(Canada) Adriana Leon	(United States) Alyssa Naeher
Young Player Award
(Canada) Olivia Smith
CONCACAF Fair Play Trophy
United States

Best XI
Goalkeeper	Defenders	Midfielders	Forwards
(United States) Alyssa Naeher	(Brazil) Rafaelle; (Canada) Ashley Lawrence; (Mexico) Rebeca Bernal; (Mexico) Karen Luna	(Brazil) Yasmim; (Canada) Jessie Fleming; (United States) Lindsey Horan	(Canada) Adriana Leon; (Mexico) Jacqueline Ovalle; (United States) Jaedyn Shaw

== Goalscorers ==
There were 84 goals scored in 25 matches, for an average of 3.36 goals per match.

6 goals

- (Canada) Adriana Leon

5 goals

- (Mexico) Jacqueline Ovalle

4 goals

- (United States) Jaedyn Shaw

3 goals

- (United States) Lindsey Horan
- (Canada) Jordyn Huitema
- (Paraguay) Jessica Martínez

2 goals

- (Argentina) Celeste Dos Santos
- (Brazil) Bia Zaneratto
- (Brazil) Gabi Nunes
- (Brazil) Geyse
- (Brazil) Yasmim
- (Canada) Olivia Smith
- (Canada) Shelina Zadorsky
- (Colombia) Linda Caicedo
- (Colombia) Manuela Paví
- (Colombia) Catalina Usme
- (Costa Rica) Priscila Chinchilla
- (Mexico) Karen Luna
- (Mexico) Mayra Pelayo
- (United States) Alex Morgan
- (United States) Olivia Moultrie
- (United States) Jenna Nighswonger

1 goal

- (Argentina) Dalila Ippólito
- (Argentina) Maricel Pereyra
- (Brazil) Adriana
- (Brazil) Antônia
- (Brazil) Beatriz
- (Brazil) Debinha
- (Brazil) Duda Santos
- (Brazil) Rafaelle
- (Brazil) Vitória Yaya
- (Canada) Kadeisha Buchanan
- (Canada) Cloé Lacasse
- (Canada) Evelyne Viens
- (Colombia) Manuela Vanegas
- (El Salvador) Samantha Fisher
- (El Salvador) Danielle Fuentes
- (Mexico) Rebeca Bernal
- (Mexico) Jasmine Casarez
- (Mexico) Nicolette Hernández
- (Mexico) Diana Ordóñez
- (Panama) Natalia Mills
- (Paraguay) Camila Barbosa
- (Paraguay) Lice Chamorro
- (Paraguay) Rebeca Fernández
- (Puerto Rico) Madison Cox
- (Puerto Rico) Danielle Marcano
- (United States) Sophia Smith
- (United States) Lynn Williams

1 own goal

- (Panama) Carina Baltrip-Reyes (against Colombia)

Source: CONCACAF

== Marketing ==
=== Broadcasting rights ===
In the United States, games were broadcast in English by CBS Sports through the Paramount+ streaming service. In Spanish, games were broadcast by ESPN Deportes and ESPN+. In Mexico, Central America, the Caribbean, and South America (including Brazil), the broadcast rights were held by ESPN. In India, games were streamed live by Fancode. In Nordic countries (Denmark, Finland, Norway, and Sweden), games were broadcast by Viaplay.

=== Sponsorship ===
The following were announced as founding partners of the tournament:

- Aramco
- Bodyarmor
- Hilton
- Cerveza Modelo
- Molten
- Neau Water
- Qatar Airways
- Toyota
- Valvoline

== Symbols ==
=== Match ball ===
Vantaggio by Molten was used as the tournament's official match ball.

=== Music ===
"Woke Up This Morning" by British band A3 served as the main official song of the tournament, using an edited version of the Chosen One Mix, which censored the “got yourself a gun” lyrics.

"Vamos" by Latin American singers Sofía Castro, Fiamma, Alexis Gomez and Pitizion served as the official Spanish-language song of the tournament. They also performed the song live at the final match.

"Natural Born Winners" by American musician Ziggy Sullivin, "Run" by Canadian rock band Our Lady Peace and "One in a Million" by Swedish singer-songwriter Bosson served as secondary theme songs of the tournament, the latter being used for the final match.

== Controversies ==
On March 6, before the semi-final match between Canada and the United States, heavy torrential rain rendered the pitch at Snapdragon Stadium extremely muddy and waterclogged, but the referee Katia García neither suspended nor abandoned the match. ESPN reached out to the CONCACAF federation, which responded that the referee alone would decide if the pitch was unplayable. However, during an interview with CBS, Christina Unkel, a retired USSF referee, implied that the referee would need to consult with the match commissioner. Unkel further stated that García has attempted to show the match commissioner, Monique André of Haïti, that the pitch was indeed unplayable.
