= Antônia (footballer) =

Brazilian footballer (born 1994)

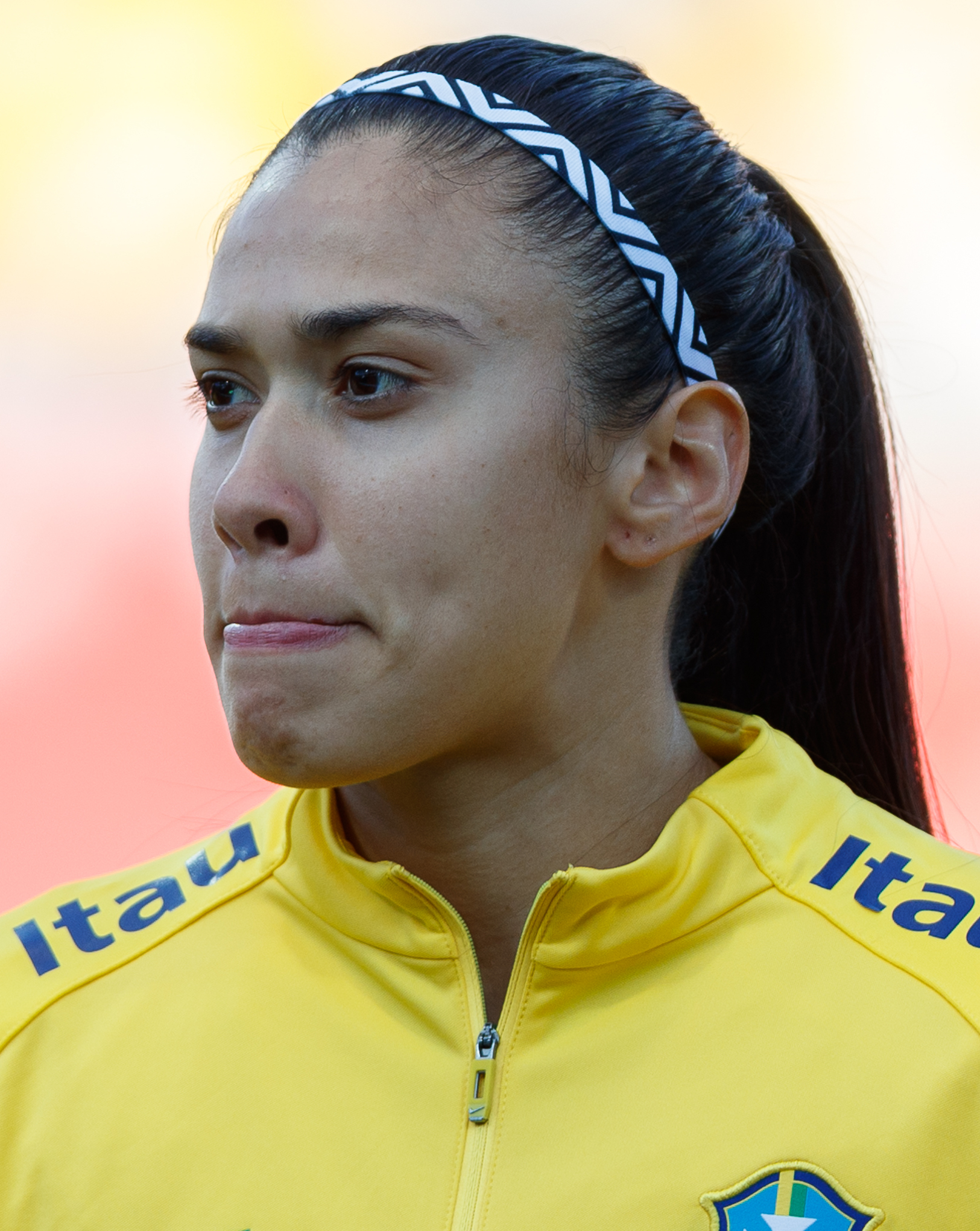
- Antônia with Brazil in 2023

Personal information
- Full name: Antônia Ronnycleide da Costa Silva
- Date of birth: 26 April 1994 (age 32)
- Place of birth: Pau dos Ferros, Rio Grande do Norte, Brazil
- Height: 1.67 m (5 ft 6 in)
- Positions: Centre-back; right-back

Team information
- Current team: Palmeiras

Senior career*
Years	Team	Apps	(Gls)
- ABC
2017	Ponte Preta	14	(1)
2018	Audax	13	(0)
2019	Iranduba	9	(0)
2020–2022	Madrid CFF	44	(1)
2022–2024	Levante	41	(1)
2024–2026	Real Madrid	23	(0)
2026–	Palmeiras	0	(0)

International career^{‡}
2020–	Brazil	50	(1)
Medal record
Women's football
Representing Brazil
Copa América Femenina
Gold medal – first place	2025 Ecuador
Olympic Games
Silver medal – second place	2024 Paris
- * Club domestic league appearances and goals as of 18:24, 7 May 2026 (UTC) ‡ National team caps and goals as of 18:24, 3 August 2025 (UTC)

Antônia Ronnycleide da Costa Silva (born 26 April 1994), simply known as Antônia, is a Brazilian professional footballer who plays as a centre-back or right-back for Campeonato Brasileiro de Futebol Feminino Série A1 club Palmeiras and the Brazil national team.

== Club career ==
Antônia has played for ABC FC, AA Ponte Preta, Grêmio Osasco Audax EC and EC Iranduba da Amazônia in Brazil and for Madrid CFF in Spain.

On 24 June 2022, Antônia was announced at Levante.

On 8 July 2024, Antônia was announced at Real Madrid.

== International career ==
Antônia was called up to the Brazil squad for the 2022 Copa América, which Brazil finished as winners.

Antônia was called up to the Brazil squad for the 2023 FIFA World Cup.

On 1 February 2024, Antônia was called up to the Brazil squad for the 2024 CONCACAF W Gold Cup.

On 2 July 2024, Antônia was called up to the Brazil squad for the 2024 Summer Olympics. Antônia won a silver medal with Brazil at the 2024 Summer Olympics.

== International goals ==
As of match played 31 July 2024

No.	Date	Location	Opponent	Score	Result	Competition
1.	6 March 2024	San Diego, United States	Mexico	2–0	3–0	2024 CONCACAF W Gold Cup

== Honours ==
- Summer Olympics silver medal: 2024
