= CONCACAF W Gold Cup =

International women's football tournament

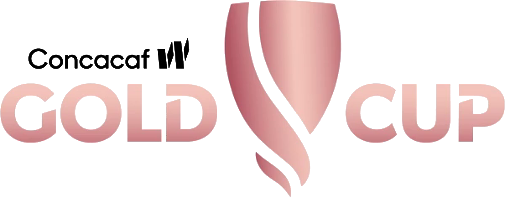
- Organiser(s): CONCACAF
- Founded: 10 December 2020; 5 years ago
- Region: North America, Central America and the Caribbean
- Teams: 12 (final tournament); 33 (qualification)
- Current champions: United States (1st title) (2024)
- Most championships: United States (1 title)
- 2024 CONCACAF W Gold Cup

The CONCACAF W Gold Cup is an international women's football competition contested by the senior women's national teams of the member associations of CONCACAF, the regional governing body of North America, Central America, and the Caribbean. It was announced in December 2020, initially unnamed though referred to as a "Women's CONCACAF Nations League". The branding was announced in August 2021, with CONCACAF describing the tournament as their "flagship women's international competition".

== Adoption ==
On 10 December 2020, the CONCACAF Council approved the structure and calendar of a "Women's CONCACAF Nations League". However, the naming and branding of the tournament had yet to be determined. The competition is intended to provide more national team matches for all CONCACAF member associations. On 19 August 2021, it was announced that the competition would be known as the CONCACAF W Gold Cup, with the branding also revealed.

== Format ==
The qualification competition, known as the "Road to CONCACAF W Gold Cup", begins with the group stage, featuring 33 women's national teams of CONCACAF split into three leagues (A, B and C). Each league features three groups, containing three teams each in League A, and four teams each in Leagues B and C. The teams in each group play against each other home-and-away in a round-robin format. The three group winners in League A qualify directly for the W Gold Cup. The group runners-up of League A and the League B group winners participate in a play-in to compete for the final three spots at the W Gold Cup. The two CONCACAF women's national teams that qualify for the Summer Olympics receive a bye directly to the W Gold Cup, skipping the group stage.

The W Gold Cup features twelve teams, including the two teams that qualified for the Summer Olympics, the six teams that qualified from the group stage and play-in, and four guest national teams from other confederations. The twelve teams are split into three groups of four, and compete in a single round-robin. Eight teams, the top two teams of each group and the two-best third-placed teams, advance to the knockout stage. The knockout stage consists of quarter-finals, semi-finals and a final to determine the champion.

== Results ==
| Ed. | Year | Host | Final | | | Semi-finalists | | Teams |
| Ed. | Year | Host | Champions | Score | Runners-up | Semi-finalists | | Teams |
|---|---|---|---|---|---|---|---|---|
| 1 | 2024 | United States | United States | 1–0 | Brazil | Canada | Mexico | 12 |

=== Performance by country ===
Teams reaching the semi-finals
| Team | Champions | Runners-up | Semi-finalists |
|---|---|---|---|
| United States | 1 (2024) | – | – |
| Brazil | – | 1 (2024) | – |
| Canada | – | – | 1 (2024) |
| Mexico | – | – | 1 (2024) |

== Comprehensive team results by tournament ==
Legend

- 1st – Champions
- 2nd – Runners-up
- SF – Semi-finals
- QF – Quarter-finals
- GS – Group stage
- Q – Qualified for upcoming tournament
- • – Did not qualify
- × – Did not enter / Withdrew / Banned
- – Hosts

For each tournament, the number of teams in each finals tournament are shown (in parentheses).

| Team (12) | (United States) 2024 (12) | Total |
|---|---|---|
| Canada | SF | 1 |
| Costa Rica | QF | 1 |
| Dominican Republic | GS | 1 |
| El Salvador | GS | 1 |
| Mexico | SF | 1 |
| Panama | GS | 1 |
| Puerto Rico | GS | 1 |
| United States | 1st | 1 |
Non-CONCACAF Invitees
| Argentina | QF | 1 |
| Brazil | 2nd | 1 |
| Colombia | QF | 1 |
| Paraguay | QF | 1 |

== Awards ==
- Best Player – for most valuable player.
- Top Goalscorer – for most prolific goal scorer.
- Best Goalkeeper – for most outstanding goalkeeper.
- Best Young Player – for the best young player.
- Fair Play Award – for the team with the best record of fair play.

| Tournament | Golden Ball | Golden Boot | Goals | Golden Glove | Young Player Award | CONCACAF Fair Play Trophy |
|---|---|---|---|---|---|---|
| United States 2024 | (United States) Jaedyn Shaw | (Canada) Adriana Leon | 6 | (United States) Alyssa Naeher | (Canada) Olivia Smith | United States |

== See also ==
- CONCACAF Gold Cup
- CONCACAF Nations League
- CONCACAF W Championship
