= 2024 Washington Spirit season =

Washington Spirit soccer season

Washington Spirit
2024 season
- Owner: Y. Michele Kang
- General manager: Mark Krikorian
- Head coach: Jonatan Giráldez (since June); Adrián González (interim, until June)
- Stadium: Audi Field (capacity: 20,000)
- League: 2nd
- 2024 NWSL x Liga MX Femenil Summer Cup: Group stage
- Playoffs: Runners-up
- Top goalscorer: Trinity Rodman, Ouleymata Sarr (8)
- Highest home attendance: 19,897 (Jun 15 vs. SD)
- Lowest home attendance: 8,182 (Mar 31 vs. UTA)
- Average home league attendance: 13,934
- Biggest win: 3 goals (4 times)
- Biggest defeat: 0–3 (Sep 20 vs. KC)
Home colors	Away colors
- All statistics correct as of November 16, 2024.

The 2024 Washington Spirit season is the team's twelfth season as a professional women's soccer team. The Spirit play in the National Women's Soccer League (NWSL), the top tier of women's soccer in the United States.

== Background ==
The Spirit finished the 2023 National Women's Soccer League season in 8th place of 12 teams. The top six teams qualified for the NWSL playoffs, and the Spirit ended one point out of playoff contention. On October 17, 2023, two days following the team's final defeat against North Carolina Courage, the team released head coach Mark Parsons from his duties after one season.

=== Hirings ===
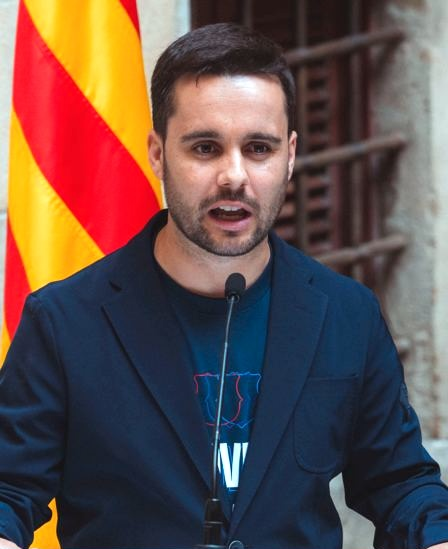
Jonatan Giráldez joined the Washington Spirit as head coach in June 2024.

On January 9, 2024, the Spirit announced the hiring of FC Barcelona Femení manager Jonatan Giráldez as the club's head coach, to arrive in June following the conclusion of the 2023–24 UEFA Women's Champions League, which Barcelona won. Adrián González, formerly manager of RCD Espanyol Femení, served as interim head coach until Giráldez's arrival and remained with the staff as an assistant coach.

== Stadium and facilities ==
The Spirit continued to play in Audi Field, their full-time home since the team's 2022 season, and trained at the United Performance Center in Leesburg, Virginia, a facility shared with D.C. United, D.C. United's youth academy, and Loudoun United FC.

== Broadcasting ==
In addition to the league's national and international broadcast agreements, ten Spirit matches of the 2024 season aired on the regional Monumental Sports Network.

== Team ==
=== Staff ===
As of October 21, 2024.

Sporting operations staff
General manager President of soccer operations	Mark Krikorian
Senior director of soccer administration	Nathan Minion

Sporting staff
Head coach	Jonatan Giráldez
Assistant coach	Adrián González
Assistant coach Director of player personnel	Mike Bristol
Player development coach	Morinao Imaizumi
Assistant coach Player development coach	Mami Yamaguchi

Performance staff
Vice president of performance, medical, and innovation	Dawn Scott
Director of performance and innovation	Kirsty Hicks
Director of data and analytics	Seungbeum Lee
Director of medical	Eric Marchek
Head athletic trainer	Alessandro Ciarla

=== Players ===
As of August 24, 2024

No.	Pos.	Player	Nation
1	GK	USA	Aubrey Kingsbury (Captain)
2	FW	USA	Trinity Rodman
3	DF	USA	Casey Krueger
4	FW	USA	Lena Silano
5	DF	FRA	Annaïg Butel
6	DF	USA	Kate Wiesner
7	MF	USA	Croix Bethune
8	MF	USA	Makenna Morris
9	DF	USA	Tara McKeown
10	MF	COL	Leicy Santos
11	FW	FRA	Ouleymata Sarr
12	MF	USA	Andi Sullivan
13	FW	USA	Brittany Ratcliffe
14	DF	CAN	Gabby Carle
16	MF	USA	Courtney Brown
17	MF	USA	Hal Hershfelt
18	GK	USA	Lyza Bosselmann
19	FW	CIV	Rosemonde Kouassi
20	FW	USA	Civana Kuhlmann
21	DF	USA	Anna Heilferty
22	MF	USA	Heather Stainbrook
24	DF	ENG	Esme Morgan
26	MF	USA	Paige Metayer
28	GK	USA	Nicole Barnhart
31	GK	USA	Kaylie Collins
32	DF	USA	Jenna Butler
33	FW	USA	Ashley Hatch
35	DF	USA	Waniya Hudson
39	FW	USA	Chloe Ricketts

== Competitions ==
Win Draw Loss

=== Regular season ===
==== Standings ====
Pos	Team	Pld	W	D	L	GF	GA	GD	Pts	Qualification
1	Orlando Pride (C, S)	26	18	6	2	46	20	+26	60	NWSL Shield, playoffs, and CONCACAF W Champions Cup
2	Washington Spirit	26	18	2	6	51	28	+23	56	Playoffs, and CONCACAF W Champions Cup
3	NJ/NY Gotham FC	26	17	5	4	41	20	+21	56	Playoffs, and CONCACAF W Champions Cup (Note: With Orlando Pride winning both the 2024 National Women's Soccer League Championship and 2024 National Women's Soccer League Shield, the third qualifying spot for the United States went to the next best club in 2024 National Women's Soccer League Shield standings not already qualified, Gotham FC.)
4	Kansas City Current	26	16	7	3	57	31	+26	55	Playoffs
5	North Carolina Courage	26	12	3	11	34	28	+6	39	Playoffs

Source: NWSL
Rules for classification: Tiebreakers
(C) Champions and W Champions Cup; (S) NWSL Shield

==== Results summary ====
Overall								Home						Away					
Pld	W	D	L	GF	GA	GD	Pts	W	D	L	GF	GA	GD	W	D	L	GF	GA	GD
26	18	2	6	51	28	+23	56	10	1	2	31	14	+17	8	1	4	20	14	+6

Last updated: November 2, 2024.
Source: NWSLsoccer.com

==== Matches ====
March 17, 2024 1	Seattle Reign FC	1–0	Washington Spirit	Seattle, Washington
3:00 p.m. PDT (UTC-7)	Balcer 3' (pen.)	Report	Wiesner (yellow card) 13'; Krueger (yellow card) 83'; Kingsbury (red card) 90+1'	Stadium: Lumen Field; Attendance: 8,557; Referee: Natalie Simon (Florida)

March 23, 2024 2	Washington Spirit	2–1	Bay FC	Washington, D.C.
7:30 p.m. EDT (UTC-5)	Hershfelt 23'; Rodman (yellow card) 59'; Bethune 90+5'	Report	Bailey 11'; Camberos (yellow card) 48'	Stadium: Audi Field; Attendance: 11,734; Referee: Danielle Chesky (Virginia)

March 31, 2024 3	Washington Spirit	2–1	Utah Royals	Washington, D.C.
1:00 p.m. EDT (UTC-5)	Sullivan 21' (pen.); Sarr 30'	Report	Foederer (yellow card) 29'; Del Fava (yellow card) 49'	Stadium: Audi Field; Attendance: 8,182; Referee: Nabil Bensalah (Indiana)

April 12, 2024 4	Houston Dash	1–3	Washington Spirit	Houston, Texas
7:00 p.m. CDT (UTC-5)	Jacobs 1'; Rubensson (yellow card) 77'	Report	Bethune (yellow card) 24' (goal) 84'; Hershfelt 52'; Ratcliffe 82'	Stadium: Shell Energy Stadium; Attendance: 7,767; Referee: Alyssa Nichols (Mississippi)

April 20, 2024 5	Washington Spirit	2–0	NJ/NY Gotham FC	Washington, D.C.
1:00 p.m. EDT (UTC-5)	Bethune 41'; Hatch 69' (pen.); Butel (yellow card) 86'	Report	Sonnett (yellow card) 55'; Nighswonger (yellow card) 70'	Stadium: Audi Field; Attendance: 15,004; Referee: Katja Koroleva (California)

April 26, 2024 6	Washington Spirit	2–3	Orlando Pride	Washington, D.C.
7:30 p.m. EDT (UTC-5)	Sarr 40'; Sullivan (yellow card) 45+5'; Hatch 65'	Report	Angelina 22'; Banda 51'; Yates 57' (pen.); Martinez (yellow card) 71' (yellow-red card) 90'; Lawrence (yellow card) 89'	Stadium: Audi Field; Attendance: 11,636; Referee: Rebecca Pagan (Illinois)

May 1, 2024 7	Chicago Red Stars	2–4	Washington Spirit	Bridgeview, Illinois
7:00 p.m. CDT (UTC-5)	Roccar (yellow card) 53'; Schlegel 79'; Nesbeth 90+2'	Report	Rodman 28' (yellow card) 58'; Sarr 30'; Butel (yellow card) 45'; Ratcliffe 83', 86'	Stadium: SeatGeek Stadium; Attendance: 2,999; Referee: Alex Billeter (Florida)

May 4, 2024 8	Portland Thorns FC	2–1	Washington Spirit	Portland, Oregon
7:00 p.m. PDT (UTC-7)	Coffey 4'; Sinclair 22'	Report	Silano 86'; Rodman (yellow card) 90+8'	Stadium: Providence Park; Attendance: 17,039; Referee: Elvis Osmanovic (Florida)

May 10, 2024 9	Racing Louisville FC	1–2	Washington Spirit	Louisville, Kentucky
8:00 p.m. EDT (UTC-5)	Demelo 45+6'; Fischer (yellow card) 59'; Sears (yellow card) 68'	Report	Sarr 5'; Milliet 34' (o.g.); Sullivan (yellow card) 45+9'; Hershfelt (yellow card) 53'; Metayer (yellow card) 87'	Stadium: Lynn Family Stadium; Attendance: 6,222; Referee: Shawn Tehini (North Carolina)

May 18, 2024 10	Washington Spirit	4–2	Angel City FC	Washington, D.C.
7:30 p.m. EDT (UTC-5)	Rodman 9', 30'; Krueger 34'; Sarr 36'	Report	Butel 20' (o.g.); Leroux 23'; Nabet (yellow card) 43'; Curry (yellow card) 45+2'; Spencer (yellow card) 61'; G. Thompson (yellow card) 65'; Emslie (yellow card) 90+4'	Stadium: Audi Field; Attendance: 13,342; Referee: Anya Voigt (Florida)

May 24, 2024 11	Washington Spirit	3–2	Seattle Reign FC	Washington, D.C.
7:30 p.m. EDT (UTC-5)	Bethune 21'; Sullivan 39' (pen.); Sarr 45'	Report	Ivory (yellow card) 38'; Van der Jagt (yellow card) 43'; Latsko 45+5'; Adames 90+6'	Stadium: Audi Field; Attendance: 11,551; Referee: Joshua Encarnación (Pennsylvania)

June 8, 2024 12	Utah Royals	0–1	Washington Spirit	Sandy, Utah
5:30 p.m. MDT (UTC-6)	Flynn (yellow card) 9'	Report	Wiesner 26'; Carle (yellow card) 85'	Stadium: America First Field; Attendance: 8,486; Referee: Laura Rodriguez (Colorado)

June 15, 2024 13	Washington Spirit	1–1	San Diego Wave FC	Washington, D.C.
7:30 p.m. EDT (UTC-5)	Hershfelt (yellow card) 46'; Rodman (yellow card) 82'; Bethune 90+6'	Report	Shaw 20'; Dahlkemper (yellow card) 21'; Colaprico (yellow card) 48'; Morgan (yellow card) 66'; Torpey (yellow card) 87'	Stadium: Audi Field; Attendance: 19,897; Referee: Katja Koroleva (California)

June 23, 2024 14	NJ/NY Gotham FC	0–2	Washington Spirit	Harrison, New Jersey
6:00 p.m. EDT (UTC-5)	Martin (yellow card) 35'; Ryan (yellow card) 39' (yellow-red card) 45+9'; Dunn (yellow card) 86'	Report	Sarr (yellow card) 15'; Brown 27'; Rodman 47'; Wiesner (yellow card) 77'	Stadium: Red Bull Arena; Attendance: 8,396; Referee: Jeremy Scheer (Connecticut)

June 29, 2024 15	Washington Spirit	0–1	North Carolina Courage	Washington, D.C.
7:30 p.m. EDT (UTC-5)	Hershfelt (yellow card) 80'	Report	Sanchez 19'; Speck (yellow card) 75'	Stadium: Audi Field; Attendance: 15,717; Referee: Rebecca Pagan (Illinois)

July 6, 2024 16	Bay FC	0–3	Washington Spirit	San Jose, California
7:00 p.m. PDT (UTC-7)	Rowland (yellow card) 3'; Sharples (yellow card) 81'	Report	Morris 4'; Rodman 21' (pen.); Sarr 57'; Carle (yellow card) 83'	Stadium: PayPal Park; Attendance: 11,384; Referee: Matthew Corrigan (Oklahoma)
Note: First match led by head coach Jonatan Giráldez.

August 25, 2024 17	Washington Spirit	4–1	Kansas City Current	Washington, D.C.
12:00 p.m. EDT (UTC-5)	Metayer 9'; Sarr 14'; Rodman 51'; Santos 73'; Ratcliffe (yellow card) 90+6'	Report	DiBernardo (yellow card) 49'; Chawinga 64'; Cook (yellow card) 72'; LaBonta (yellow card) 85'	Stadium: Audi Field; Attendance: 17,130; Referee: Brad Jensen (Utah)

September 1, 2024 18	San Diego Wave FC	1–1	Washington Spirit	San Diego, California
5:00 p.m. PDT (UTC-7)	McNabb 68'	Report	McNabb 30' (o.g.)	Stadium: Snapdragon Stadium; Attendance: 23,541; Referee: Joshua Encarnación (Pennsylvania)

September 7, 2024 19	Washington Spirit	2–1	Portland Thorns FC	Washington, D.C.
12:30 p.m. EDT (UTC-5)	Rodman 60'; Santos 90+6'	Report	Sugita 49'	Stadium: Audi Field; Attendance: 14,306; Referee: Greg Dopka (Illinois)

September 15, 2024 20	Washington Spirit	3–0	Houston Dash	Washington, D.C.
1:00 p.m. EDT (UTC-5)	Hatch 7' (pen.), 26'; Rodman 46'	Report	Chapman (yellow card) 45+9'	Stadium: Audi Field; Attendance: 11,792; Referee: Mathew Corrigan (Oklahoma)

September 20, 2024 21	Kansas City Current	3–0	Washington Spirit	Kansas City, Missouri
7:00 p.m. CDT (UTC-5)	Prince 4'; Cooper (yellow card) 30'; LaBonta 31'; Chawinga 69'	Report	Silano (red card) 90+8'	Stadium: CPKC Stadium; Attendance: 11,500; Referee: Matthew Thompson (Mississippi)

September 27, 2024 22	Angel City FC	1–2	Washington Spirit	Los Angeles, California
7:00 p.m. PDT (UTC-7)	Bright 51'	Report	Morgan (yellow card) 14'; Santos (yellow card) 28'; Metayer (yellow card) 35'; Hatch 39'; McKeown (yellow card) 69'; Morris 78'; Hershfelt (yellow card) 90+6'	Stadium: BMO Stadium; Attendance: 19,257; Referee: Alyssa Nichols (Mississippi)

October 6, 2024 23	Orlando Pride	2–0	Washington Spirit	Orlando, Florida
5:00 p.m. EDT (UTC-5)	Marta 56' (pen.); McKeown 73' (o.g.)	Report	Butel (yellow card) 3'; Stainbrook (yellow card) 39'; McKeown (yellow card) 54'	Stadium: Inter&Co Stadium; Attendance: 7,729; Referee: Danielle Chesky (Virginia)

October 13, 2024 24	Washington Spirit	4–1	Racing Louisville FC	Washington, D.C.
5:00 p.m. EDT (UTC-5)	Morris 36', 43'; Kouassi (yellow card) 42'; Hatch 56' (pen.); Silano 90+7'	Report	Sears 72'	Stadium: Audi Field; Attendance: 13,781; Referee: Abdou Ndiaye (Louisiana)

October 20, 2024 25	Washington Spirit	2–0	Chicago Red Stars	Washington, D.C.
5:00 p.m. EDT (UTC-5)	Stainbrook 31' (yellow card) 90+4'; Hershfelt (yellow card) 47'; Kouassi (red card) 70'; Morris 83'	Report	Ludmila (red card) 72'	Stadium: Audi Field; Attendance: 17,065; Referee: Adam Kilpatrick (Massachusetts)

November 2, 2024 26	North Carolina Courage	0–1	Washington Spirit	Cary, North Carolina
7:30 p.m. EDT (UTC-5)		Report	Hatch 37'	Stadium: WakeMed Soccer Park; Attendance: 10,026; Referee: Elvis Osmanovic (Florida)

==== Results by matchday ====
Matchday	1	2	3	4	5	6	7	8	9	10	11	12	13	14	15	16	17	18	19	20	21	22	23	24	25	26
Stadium	A	H	H	A	H	H	A	A	A	H	H	A	H	A	H	A	H	A	H	H	A	A	A	H	H	A
Result	L	W	W	W	W	L	W	L	W	W	W	W	D	W	L	W	W	D	W	W	L	W	L	W	W	W
Position	12	6	4	3	2	3	3	3	3	3	3	3	3	3	3	2	2	2	2	2	2	2	2	2	2	2

Updated to match(es) played on November 2, 2024. Source: NWSL
A = Away; H = Home; W = Win; D = Draw; L = Loss

=== Playoffs ===
The Spirit finished the regular season in 2nd place and qualified for the NWSL playoffs as the second-seeded of eight teams.

==== Matches ====
November 10, 2024 Quarterfinals	Washington Spirit	2–1 (a.e.t.)	Bay FC	Washington, District of Columbia
12:30 p.m. EST (UTC−5)	Hershfelt (yellow card) 46'; McKeown 86'; Dydasco 96' (o.g.)	Report	Oshoala (yellow card) 52'; Malonson (yellow card) 59'; Oshoala 82'; Pickett (yellow card) 99'	Stadium: Audi Field; Attendance: 19,215; Referee: Katja Koroleva (California)

November 16, 2024 Semifinals	Washington Spirit	1–1 (a.e.t.) (3–0 p)	NJ/NY Gotham FC	Washington, District of Columbia
12:00 p.m. EST (UTC−5)	Hershfelt 90+3'; Krueger (yellow card) 97'; Rodman (yellow card) 102'	Report	Carter (yellow card) 17'; Sheehan (yellow card) 23'; González 56'; Bruninha (yellow card) 72' (yellow-red card) 101'; Nighswonger (yellow card) 90+2'; Zerboni (yellow card) 116'	Stadium: Audi Field; Attendance: 19,365; Referee: Matthew Thompson (Mississippi)
	Penalties
	Hatch (penalty scored); Silano (penalty scored); McKeown (penalty scored)		(penalty missed) González; (penalty missed) Zerboni; (penalty missed) Nighswonger

November 23, 2024 Championship	Orlando Pride	1–0	Washington Spirit	Kansas City, Missouri
8:00 p.m. EST (UTC−5)	Abello (yellow card) 31'; Banda 37', (yellow card) 70'	Report	Kouassi (yellow card) 28'; Hershfelt (yellow card) 42'; Metayer (yellow card) 50'; Carle (yellow card) 90+7'	Stadium: CPKC Stadium; Attendance: 11,500; Referee: Alyssa Nichols

=== NWSL x Liga MX Femenil Summer Cup ===
The Spirit finished last in Group D of the Summer Cup and failed to advance to the tournament knockout stage.

==== Group stage standings ====
Pos	Team	Pld	W	PW	PL	L	GF	GA	GD	Pts	Qualification	NYJ	CHI	WAS	GUA
1	(United States Soccer Federation) NJ/NY Gotham FC	3	2	1	0	0	4	0	+4	8	Advances to knockout stage	—	0–0	1–0	3–0
2	(United States Soccer Federation) Chicago Red Stars	3	1	0	1	1	3	3	0	4		0–0	—	3–2	0–1
3	(United States Soccer Federation) Washington Spirit	3	1	0	0	2	4	5	−1	3		0–1	2–3	—	2–1
4	(Mexican Football Federation) Guadalajara	3	1	0	0	2	2	5	−3	3		0–3	1–0	1–2	—

Source: NWSL
Rules for classification: tiebreakers

==== Group stage matches ====
July 21, 2024	Washington Spirit	2–1	Guadalajara	Chester, United States
4:30 p.m.	Metayer 13'; Silano 47'	Report	Cervantes 68'	Stadium: Subaru Park; Attendance: 1,101

July 28, 2024	NJ/NY Gotham FC	1–0	Washington Spirit	Chester, United States
6:00 p.m.	Ryan 62' (pen.)	Report		Stadium: Subaru Park; Attendance: 3,523; Referee: Sergii Demianchuk

July 31, 2024	Washington Spirit	2–3	Chicago Red Stars	Richmond, United States
7:30 p.m.	Sullivan 55' (pen.); Silano 83'	Report	Bike 48'; Joseph 60'; Griffith 89'	Stadium: City Stadium; Referee: Melinda Homa

== Transactions ==
=== 2024 NWSL Draft ===
Draft picks are not automatically signed to the team roster. The 2024 NWSL Draft was held on January 12, 2024.

R	P	Player	Pos.	College	Status	Ref.
1	3	(United States) Croix Bethune	MF	(United States) University of Georgia	Signed to a three-year contract with an option on March 11, 2024.	
1	5	(United States) Hal Hershfelt	MF	(United States) Clemson University	Signed to a three-year contract on March 11, 2024.	
1	7	(United States) Kate Wiesner	DF	(United States) Pennsylvania State University	Signed to a three-year contract on March 11, 2024.	
1	13	(United States) Makenna Morris	DF	(United States) Clemson University	Signed to a one-year contract on March 11, 2024.	
3	35	(United States) Anna Podojil	FW	(United States) University of Arkansas	Not signed.	
4	49	(United States) Courtney Brown	MF	(United States) University of Utah	Signed to a three-year contract on March 11, 2024.	

=== Contract operations ===
Contract options
Date	Player	Pos.	Notes	Ref.
November 20, 2023	(United States) Ashley Hatch	FW	2024 option exercised.	
November 20, 2023	(United States) Aubrey Kingsbury	GK	2026 option exercised.	
November 20, 2023	(United States) Trinity Rodman	FW	2024 option exercised.	
November 20, 2023	(United States) Andi Sullivan	MF	2026 option exercised.	

Re-signings
Date	Player	Pos.	Notes	Ref.
September 7, 2023	(United States) Ashley Sanchez	MF	Re-signed to a three-year contract through 2026.	
December 20, 2023	(United States) Lyza Bosselmann	GK	Re-signed to a three-year contract with an option.	
December 20, 2023	(United States) Paige Metayer	MF	Re-signed to a three-year contract with an option.	
January 5, 2024	(United States) Nicole Barnhart	GK	Re-signed to a one-year contract.	
March 5, 2024	(United States) Ashley Hatch	FW	Re-signed to a three-year contract with an option.	
September 19, 2024	(United States) Tara McKeown	DF	Re-signed to a four-year contract through 2027 with an option.	

=== Loans in ===
Date	Player	Pos.	Previous club	Fee/notes	Ref.
July 27, 2024	(Puerto Rico) Jill Aguilera	MF	(United States) Carolina Ascent FC	Loaned through the 2024 summer FIFA international window.	
July 27, 2024	(United States) Maya Gordon	DF	(United States) Dallas Trinity FC	Loaned through the 2024 summer FIFA international window.	

=== Loans out ===
Date	Player	Pos.	Destination club	Fee/notes	Ref.
September 23, 2024	(United States) Waniya Hudson	DF	(United States) Dallas Trinity FC	Loaned through the end of the 2024 calendar year.	

=== Transfers in ===
Date	Player	Pos.	Previous club	Fee/notes	Ref.
January 10, 2024	(United States) Casey Krueger	DF	(United States) Chicago Red Stars	Free agent signed to a three-year contract.	
January 11, 2024	(United States) Brittany Ratcliffe	FW	(United States) North Carolina Courage	Free agent signed to a three-year contract.	
March 11, 2024	(United States) Heather Stainbrook	MF	(United States) Utah Valley Wolverines	Preseason trialist signed to a three-year contract.	
April 2, 2024	(Colombia) Leicy Santos	MF	(Spain) Atlético Madrid	Signed to a three-year contract.	
May 22, 2024	(United States) Waniya Hudson	DF	(United States) Notre Dame Fighting Irish	Signed to a one-year contract.	
June 13, 2024	(England) Esme Morgan	DF	(England) Manchester City	Acquired in exchange for an undisclosed fee and signed to a four-year contract.	
July 10, 2024	(Ivory Coast) Rosemonde Kouassi	FW	(France) FC Fleury 91	Acquired in exchange for an undisclosed fee and signed to a four-year contract.	
July 18, 2024	(United States) Jenna Butler	DF	(United States) NC State Wolfpack	Signed to short-term national team replacement contracts.	
July 18, 2024	(United States) Kaylie Collins	MF	(United States) Seattle Reign FC	Signed to short-term national team replacement contracts.	
July 18, 2024	(United States) Olivia Stone	FW	(United States) San Diego Toreros	Signed to short-term national team replacement contracts.	

=== Transfers out ===
Date	Player	Pos.	Destination club	Fee/notes	Ref.
November 20, 2023	(United States) Camryn Biegalski	DF	(United States) Chicago Red Stars	Free agent signing.	
November 20, 2023	(United States) Amber Brooks	DF	(United States) Dallas Trinity FC	Free agent signing.	
November 20, 2023	(United States) Bayley Feist	MF	(United States) Kansas City Current	Free agent signing.	
November 20, 2023	(United States) Tori Huster	DF	Retired	Free agent signing.	
November 20, 2023	(Republic of Ireland) Marissa Sheva	MF	(United States) Portland Thorns FC	Free agent signing.	
November 20, 2023	(England) Nicole Douglas	MF	(England) London City Lionesses	Waived.	
November 20, 2023	(United States) Maddie Elwell	DF		Waived.	
November 20, 2023	(France) Inès Jaurena	MF	(France) FC Fleury 91	Waived.	
December 12, 2023	(United States) Dorian Bailey	DF	(United States) Bay FC	Traded in exchange for roster protection in the 2024 NWSL expansion draft.	
December 12, 2023	(United States) Sam Staab	DF	(United States) Chicago Red Stars	Traded in exchange for the 3rd overall pick of the 2024 NWSL Draft.	
December 12, 2023	(United States) Ashley Sanchez	MF	(United States) North Carolina Courage	Traded in exchange for the 5th overall pick of the 2024 NWSL Draft and $250,000 in allocation money.	
April 8, 2024	(Panama) Riley Tanner	FW	(United States) Spokane Zephyr FC	Waived.	

=== Injury listings ===
Date	Player	Pos.	List	Injury	Ref.
July 12, 2023	(United States) Civana Kuhlmann	FW	Season-ending injury	Knee injury sustained in 2023.	
April 30, 2024	(United States) Anna Heilferty	DF	Season-ending injury	Torn ACL sustained in a match against the Orlando Pride.	
August 8, 2024	(United States) Lyza Bosselmann	GK	Season-ending injury	Torn wrist ligament.	
September 4, 2024	(United States) Croix Bethune	MF	Season-ending injury	Torn meniscus.	
October 9, 2024	(United States) Andi Sullivan	MF	Season-ending injury	Torn ACL sustained in a match against the Orlando Pride.	

=== Preseason trialists ===
Trialists are non-rostered invitees during preseason and are not automatically signed. The Spirit released their preseason roster on January 25, 2024.

Player	Pos.	Previous club	Status	Ref.
(Canada) Maya Antoine	DF	(United States) Vanderbilt Commodores	Not signed.	
(United States) Heather Stainbrook	MF	(United States) Utah Valley Wolverines	Signed to a three-year contract on March 11, 2024.	

== Awards ==
As of November 19, 2024

=== NWSL annual awards ===
- 2024 NWSL Rookie of the Year: Croix Bethune
- 2024 NWSL Best XI: Casey Krueger, Croix Bethune, Trinity Rodman
- 2024 NWSL Second XI: Tara McKeown, Hal Hershfelt

=== NWSL monthly awards ===
style="text-align:left"|Best XI of the Month
Month	Pos.	Nat.	Player	Ref.
March/ April	DF	(United States) USA	Casey Krueger	
March/ April	MF	(United States) USA	Croix Bethune	
May	DF	(United States) USA	Croix Bethune (2)	
May	FW	(France) FRA	Ouleymata Sarr	
June	DF	(United States) USA	Casey Krueger (2)	
June	MF	(United States) USA	Croix Bethune (3)	
September	FW	(United States) USA	Trinity Rodman	
October/ November	FW	(United States) USA	Makenna Morris	

==== Rookie of the Month ====
NWSL Rookie of the Month
Month	Pos.	Rookie of the Month		Statline	Ref.
March/April	MF	(United States) USA	Croix Bethune	Led rookies with 3 goals, 2 assists in 5 matches	
May	MF	(United States) USA	Croix Bethune	1 goal, 7 assists in 5 matches; set rookie record for assists in a season; first rookie to score 3 assists in a match	
June	MF	(United States) USA	Croix Bethune	1 goal, 1 assist; first rookie to win award in three consecutive months	
August	MF	(United States) USA	Croix Bethune	1 assist, tying all-time record for assists in a season; first rookie to win award four times in one season	
October/November	FW	(United States) USA	Makenna Morris	3 goals, 1 assist; brace vs. LOU was only multi-goal match for a rookie during the season	

=== Weekly awards ===
NWSL Goal of the Week
Week	Winner	Ref.
12	(United States) Croix Bethune	
13	(United States) Trinity Rodman	
19	(United States) Trinity Rodman (2)	

NWSL Save of the Week
Week	Winner	Ref.
3	(United States) Aubrey Kingsbury	
21	(United States) Aubrey Kingsbury (2)	
