= 2023 Washington Spirit season =

Washington Spirit soccer season

Washington Spirit
2023 season
- Owner: Y. Michele Kang
- General manager: Mark Krikorian
- Head coach: Mark Parsons
- Stadium: Audi Field (capacity: 20,000)
- League: 8th
- Challenge Cup: Group Stage
- Top goalscorer: Ashley Hatch (8)
- Highest home attendance: 12,232 (May 6 vs. SD)
- Lowest home attendance: 7,073 (Apr 22 vs. HOU)
- Average home league attendance: 9,940
- Biggest win: 3–1 (May 6 vs. SD)
- Biggest defeat: 0–3 (Jul 1 vs. ORL)
| Home colors | Away colors |
- All statistics correct as of July 8, 2023.

The 2023 Washington Spirit season was the team's eleventh season as a professional women's soccer team. The Spirit played in the National Women's Soccer League (NWSL), the top tier of women's soccer in the United States.

== Background ==
The Spirit failed to defend their 2021 championship during the 2022 season, and also failed to qualify for the NWSL Playoffs, finishing in 11th place of 12 teams. The team fired championship-winning Kris Ward after a 1–6–9 start and allegations of misconduct toward players, leaving Albertin Montoya to finish the season as interim head coach. Ward was later banned indefinitely by the NWSL following a league investigation into the allegations. The team also hired Mark Krikorian, formerly head coach of the Florida State Seminoles women's soccer team, as its new general manager in June 2022.

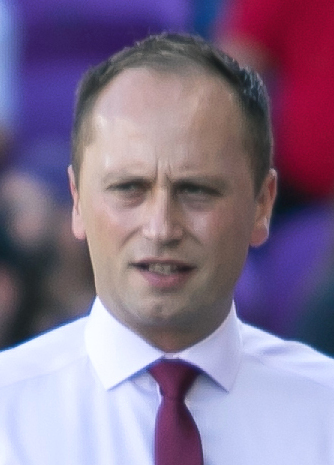
The Spirit hired former manager Mark Parsons as the team's new head coach in November 2022

=== Hirings ===
In November 2022, the Spirit announced several technical and front-office hirings, including:

- Dawn Scott, formerly of The Football Association and United States Soccer Federation and most recently of Inter Miami CF, to staff and lead the Spirit's new performance and medical division, on November 1
- Morinao Imaizumi, formerly of Florida State University and most recently with Chicago Red Stars, as a player development coach on November 8
- Mark Parsons, its former head coach and most recently manager of the Netherlands women's national football team, as its new permanent head coach on November 21

=== Offseason transactions ===
On February 7, 2023, the Spirit signed Olympique Lyon midfielder Inès Jaurena, who had ended her contract with Lyon by mutual consent on January 29.

On March 3, 2023, the Spirit signed midfielder Chloe Ricketts, who at 15 years and 283 days old had signed her NWSL contract at an age three days' younger than Olivia Moultrie in June 2021, setting a new NWSL record for youngest signing. The record was broken again 18 days later, when San Diego Wave FC signed Melanie Barcenas at 15 years and 138 days old. Rickett was signed using the league's new under-18 entry mechanism added by the collective bargaining agreement signed near the start of the NWSL preseason.

=== Change in colors ===
The Spirit abandoned its red, white, and blue color scheme for monochromatic white and black kits with a metallic chrome crest. The team debuted the kits and crest to premium season ticket holders, supporters' group members, and sponsors at the Penn Social event space on March 1, 2023. Spirit owner Y. Michele Kang said the changes represent a clean-slate transition toward a planned club rebranding.

== Summary ==
=== March/April ===
The Spirit went undefeated in its first five league matches and did not trail an opponent during that span, but lost its 2023 NWSL Challenge Cup opener to NJ/NY Gotham FC 1–0 on April 19. The unbeaten stretch included the professional debut of Ricketts on April 15 against North Carolina Courage.

On April 7, the Spirit announced the hiring of Mami Yamaguchi, a former Japan national team player and former player and assistant coach to Mark Krikorian at Florida State, as an assistant coach. She had most recently served as an assistant coach and player-coach at Detroit City FC and AFC Ann Arbor.

=== May ===
The Spirit continued winning through the start of May, with wins of 3–1 against San Diego Wave FC on May 6, 4–2 against Orlando Pride in the second match of Challenge Cup group play, and 1–0 against Angel City FC on May 13 to move to the top of the NWSL table. The team's time atop the standings ended with its next match on May 20, its first league loss of the season, falling 2–1 at Orlando Pride. The Spirit finished May tied for second with 16 points with OL Reign, San Diego Wave FC, and Portland Thorns FC after a 1–1 draw against leaders NJ/NY Gotham FC on May 28, equalizing on a Paige Metayer goal in the 69th minute.

==== Kang bids for OL Féminin ====
On May 13, Olympique Lyon won the Coupe de France féminine 2–1 over Paris Saint-Germain, its 10th victory in the competition, on a brace by Ada Hegerberg. The match was attended by Spirit owner Y. Michele Kang, who also raised the trophy with Lyon. On May 16, Olympique Lyon holding company OL Groupe and Kang announced the formation of a separate entity that would be composed of the Spirit and Olympique Lyon Féminin. OL Groupe would retain a 48% stake in the resulting new entity, and Kang would become the club's majority owner and CEO, pending regulatory approval.

=== June ===
The Spirit opened June with a 1–1 draw at home against Racing Louisville FC, scoring through Trinity Rodman in the 3rd minute. Louisville equalized on a 51st-minute penalty kick by Savannah DeMelo, then lost Elli Pikkujämsä to a straight red card in the 77th minute. Despite the advantage, the Spirit failed to convert again.

On June 10, the Spirit ended a three-match winless streak by defeating Angel City FC 2–1 at home on goals by Ashley Hatch and Ashley Sanchez, while the defense limited Angel City to one shot on goal in the second half. Goalkeeper Aubrey Kingsbury suffered a head injury in the 90th minute and was substituted out for backup Nicole Barnhart.

On June 14, the Spirit lost to North Carolina Courage 2–1 at home in a Challenge Cup match, conceding the losing goal in second-half stoppage time. The team played without starters Hatch, Rodman, Sanchez, and Andi Sullivan, while Kingsbury remained out while recovering from the head injury sustained against Angel City. Barnhart was team captain for the match, making her 151st appearance across competitions and passing Ashley Harris for second-most appearances by a goalkeeper in league history. Her start alongside 16-year-old Chloe Ricketts resulted in the largest age gap between starting players in a league match, at 25 years, 7 months, and 13 days. Riley Tanner also made her first career start for the Spirit in the match.

On June 18, the Spirit rallied from a two-goal deficit to defeat Kansas City Current 3–2 on the road. The first concession was by Michelle Cooper 22 seconds into the match, setting a new league record for the fastest goal scored in a match, followed by a second goal conceded in the 23rd minute by Debinha on a penalty kick called for a Spirit handball foul in the penalty area. The Spirit's rally began with a Sanchez goal in the 37th minute, a Metayer equalizer in the 82nd minute, and an 88th-minute match winner by Tara McKeown, a defender who played as a forward until the start of the 2023 season.

The Spirit then lost 4–2 on the road to Portland Thorns FC on June 23, conceding a hat-trick to Sophia Smith. The Spirit equalized twice, through Hatch in the 13th minute and Sanchez in the 46th minute.

On June 30, the Spirit signed French forward Ouleymata Sarr, whose contract with Paris FC had expired, to a three-year contract.

=== World Cup period ===
Six Spirit players left the team in late June to play for their national teams in the 2023 Women's World Cup:

- MF Aubrey Kingsbury for United States
- FW Trinity Rodman for United States
- MF Ashley Sanchez for United States
- MF Andi Sullivan for United States
- FW Marissa Sheva for Republic of Ireland
- FW Riley Tanner for Panama

On June 28, the Spririt signed Mariana Speckmaier and Jordan Thompson to cap-exempt short-term national team replacement player contracts allowed by league rules.

In the Spirit's first regular-season match without its World Cup callups on July 1, the team lost 3–0 at home against Orlando Pride. Nicole Barnhart started in goal for Kingsbury, Hatch took on captaincy of the team, Amber Brooks moved into the midfield, and Nicole Douglas and Lena Silano took on starting roles.

On July 6, the Spirit signed French defender Annaïg Butel, formerly of Paris FC, to a two-year contract with an option for an additional year. The Spirit's last match before the World Cup came on July 8th in San Diego against the Wave, who also had several players called up to national teams for the World Cup. They would score first on a Hatch penalty kick which was awarded after a VAR review, and in the second half they found themselves 2-1 up after Cheyenne Shorts scored at both ends of the pitch. That lead would last until second-half stoppage time when Taylor Flint headed in an equalizer, ensuring the points would be shared.

With the regular season paused until late August, the Spirit still had their last three Challenge Cup group stage games left to play, the first of which was against familiar rivals North Carolina Courage. They conceded six goals in a 22-minute span in the second half, all but knocking them out of contention for the semifinals of the midseason tournament. The following week against NJ/NY Gotham, they would fall behind 2-0 inside 10 minutes, but following a weather delay, they came back to win 4-2, with Hatch scoring a brace and Ricketts and defender Camryn Biegalski scoring their first professional goals. They'd end their Challenge Cup campaign in winning fashion against the Pride a week later on a goal from distance by national team replacement player (NTRP) Mariana Speckmaier, who was in her second stint with the Spirit. Barnhart made seven saves in the match, earning her 56th career clean sheet in the process.

=== August/September ===
Regular season play resumed on August 19th on the road for the Spirit against Houston Dash, which marked the 100th appearance for Hatch and Kingsbury with the Spirit, joining Tori Huster as the only members of the Spirit to reach that milestone. After a scoreless first half, Ouleymata Sarr made her Spirit debut and had an impact just moments later, assisting on Ashley Sanchez's 63rd-minute opening goal after the latter made her return from World Cup duty. However, for the second regular season game in a row, the Spirit would concede a stoppage time equalizer, this time to Maria Sánchez, sending both teams home with a point. The Spirit would be the ones to get a stoppage time equalizer the following week as Hatch's penalty in second-half stoppage time cancelled out Morgan Weaver's opener for the Portland Thorns. However, the Spirit would lose their next two games by an 0-2 scoreline, at home to Chicago and away at NJ/NY Gotham, and after being firmly in playoff position for the first three quarters of the season, that began to slip.

On September 30, the Spirit faced Kansas City Current, the last team they won against in regular-season play. Debinha gave the visitors the lead from the penalty spot in the first half, before Sarr scored her first goal for the Spirit in the 52nd minute. After several chances in the last few minutes of the game, Trinity Rodman got on the end of a long ball from Gabrielle Carle and slotted home the eventual game winner in the first minute of second half stoppage time, sending the crowd of over 11,000 home ecstatic. This was the Spirit's first league win since June 18th, against the same opponents and was much-needed in the context of the playoff race.

=== October ===
The win over Kansas City set up a "win and in" scenario for the Spirit ahead of their game in Seattle against OL Reign, which was to be the final regular season home game for Reign and U.S. women's national team star Megan Rapinoe. Despite playing in front of what was at the time a record-setting crowd of over 34,000, both teams struggled to break through, but it was the Spirit who had several chances to win in the end. Dorian Bailey and Rodman both saw chances saved by Reign goalkeeper Claudia Dickey, the latter coming deep into second-half stoppage time, and the points would ultimately be shared. However, Tara McKeown would be booked in the waning moments of the match, earning her 5th yellow card of the season and thus a 1-match ban for card accumulation. The Spirit bench was issued a yellow card in the 44th minute, which was attributed to head coach Mark Parsons, giving him a 1-match ban for his third booking of the season. Both would miss the season finale as a result.

For the first time ever, all NWSL teams would play their final matches simultaneously on "Decision Day," as is customary in other leagues around the world, and the Spirit would face North Carolina Courage at home in the crucial match on October 15th. With Parsons suspended, assistant coach Mike Bristol served as acting head coach. The Courage would maintain possession early in the match, but things turned even more in their favor in the 20th minute when Rodman was shown a yellow card by the referee for a reckless challenge on Courage captain Denise O'Sullivan. The video assistant referee recommended an on-field review to upgrade the card to red for serious foul play, and Rodman was given her marching orders after the referee cancelled the yellow and showed red. Two minutes later, Tyler Lussi gave the Courage the lead, and despite suspicions of offside, the goal stood. For the rest of the match, the Spirit would struggle to create chances down a player, and would ultimately lose 1-0, which combined with other results dropped them out of playoff contention and ended their season.

Two days later, the Spirit fired Parsons.

== Style of play ==

The Spirit's 4–4–2 diamond formation as deployed against Racing Louisville FC on June 3

Under newly appointed head coach Mark Parsons, the Spirit deployed a 4–4–2 diamond formation and a fast-paced, direct style of play that relied in the first half of the season on shorter passing sequences than any other team in the NWSL.

== Stadium and facilities ==
The Spirit continued to play in Audi Field, their full-time home since the team's 2022 season. The Spirit moved its training to a temporary facility shared with Major League Soccer franchise D.C. United at Segra Field. As of 26 March 2023, Spirit ownership continued searching for available land for plans toward a permanent, stand-alone Spirit training facility.

== Broadcasting ==
On March 30, 2023, Monumental Sports & Entertainment announced a partnership to broadcast nine Spirit road matches on NBC Sports Washington and provide social media coverage of the team.

== Team ==
=== Staff ===
As of May 12, 2023.

Sporting operations staff
| General manager President of soccer operations | Mark Krikorian |
| Senior director of soccer operations | Nathan Minion |

Technical staff
| Head coach | Mark Parsons |
| Assistant coach | Angela Salem |
| Assistant coach Director of player personnel | Mike Bristol |
| Player development coach | Morinao Imaizumi |
| Assistant coach Player development coach | Mami Yamaguchi |

Performance staff
| Vice president of performance, medical, and innovation | Dawn Scott |
| Athletic trainer | Alessandro Ciarla |
| Athletic trainer | Rylee Learn |

=== Players ===
As of July 6, 2023.

First-team roster
| No. | Pos. | Nation | Name | Birthday (age) | Since | Previous team | Notes |
|---|---|---|---|---|---|---|---|
| 1 | GK | (United States) USA | Aubrey Kingsbury | November 20, 1991 (aged 31) | 2018 | (United States) Orlando Pride | |
| 18 | GK | (United States) USA | Lyza Bosselmann | July 27, 2001 (aged 21) | 2023 | (United States) Gonzaga | |
| 28 | GK | (United States) USA | Nicole Barnhart | October 10, 1981 (aged 41) | 2022 | (United States) Kansas City Current | |
| 3 | DF | (United States) USA | Sam Staab | March 28, 1997 (aged 25) | 2019 | (United States) Clemson | |
| 5 | DF | (France) FRA | Anaïg Butel | February 15, 1992 (aged 31) | 2023 | (France) Paris FC | INT (Note: INT: International player) |
| 9 | DF | (United States) USA | Tara McKeown | July 2, 1999 (aged 23) | 2021 | (United States) University of Southern California | |
| 14 | DF | (Canada) CAN | Gabrielle Carle | October 12, 1998 (aged 24) | 2022 | (Sweden) Kristianstads DFF | INT |
| 16 | DF | (United States) USA | Maddie Elwell | August 1, 1999 (aged 23) | 2023 | (United States) Vanderbilt | |
| 19 | DF | (United States) USA | Dorian Bailey | January 28, 1997 (aged 26) | 2019 | (United States) University of North Carolina | |
| 21 | DF | (United States) USA | Anna Heilferty | April 17, 1999 (aged 23) | 2021 | (United States) Boston University | SEI (Note: SEI: Season-ending injury list) |
| 22 | DF | (United States) USA | Amber Brooks | January 23, 1991 (aged 32) | 2022 | (United States) OL Reign | |
| 30 | DF | (United States) USA | Camryn Biegalski | August 11, 1998 (aged 24) | 2021 | (United States) Chicago Red Stars | |
| 37 | DF | (United States) USA | Jordan Thompson | September 8, 1998 (aged 24) | 2023 | (United States) Gonzaga Bulldogs | NTR (Note: NTR: Short-term National Team Replacement signing) |
| 7 | MF | (France) FRA | Inès Jaurena | May 14, 1991 (aged 31) | 2023 | (France) Olympique Lyon | INT |
| 10 | MF | (United States) USA | Ashley Sanchez | March 16, 1999 (aged 24) | 2020 | (United States) University of California, Los Angeles | |
| 12 | MF | (United States) USA | Andi Sullivan | December 20, 1995 (aged 27) | 2018 | (United States) Stanford | |
| 13 | MF | (United States) USA | Bayley Feist | March 14, 1997 (aged 26) | 2019 | (United States) Wake Forest | D45 (Note: D45: 45-day disabled list) |
| 17 | MF | (England) ENG | Nicole Douglas | July 31, 2000 (aged 22) | 2023 | (United States) Arizona State | INT |
| 23 | MF | (United States) USA | Tori Huster | September 23, 1989 (aged 33) | 2013 | (United States) Western New York Flash | SEI |
| 25 | MF | (Republic of Ireland) IRL | Marissa Sheva | April 22, 1997 (aged 25) | 2022 | (United States) Utah Royals FC | |
| 26 | MF | (United States) USA | Paige Metayer | September 23, 2000 (aged 22) | 2023 | (United States) University of California | |
| 27 | MF | (Panama) PAN | Riley Tanner | October 15, 1999 (aged 23) | 2023 | (United States) Alabama | |
| 39 | MF | (United States) USA | Chloe Ricketts | May 23, 2007 (aged 15) | 2023 | (United States) AFC Ann Arbor | U18 (Note: U18: Under-18 signing) |
| 2 | FW | (United States) USA | Trinity Rodman | May 20, 2002 (aged 20) | 2021 | (United States) Washington State | |
| 8 | FW | (France) FRA | Ouleymata Sarr | October 8, 1995 (aged 27) | 2023 | (France) Paris FC | INT |
| 20 | FW | (United States) USA | Civana Kuhlmann | April 14, 1999 (aged 23) | 2023 | (United States) University of Colorado Boulder | |
| 24 | FW | (United States) USA | Lena Silano | February 28, 2000 (aged 23) | 2023 | (United States) Long Beach State | |
| 33 | FW | (United States) USA | Ashley Hatch | May 25, 1995 (aged 27) | 2018 | (United States) North Carolina Courage | |
| 37 | FW | (Venezuela) VEN | Mariana Speckmaier | December 26, 1997 (aged 25) | 2023 | (Iceland) Valur | NTR |

== Competitions ==
=== NWSL Challenge Cup ===
==== Group stage ====
| April 19, 2023 1 | NJ/NY Gotham FC | 0–1 | Washington Spirit | Harrison, New Jersey |
| 7:30 p.m. EDT (UTC-4) | Lynn Williams 56' (Mewis); Nighswonger (yellow card) 90' | Report | Sanchez (yellow card) 74' | Stadium: Red Bull Arena; Attendance: 7,543; Referee: Shawn Tehini (North Carolina) |

| May 10, 2023 2 | Washington Spirit | 4–2 | Orlando Pride | Washington, D.C. |
| 7:30 p.m. EDT (UTC-4) | Silano 33'; Staab 37'; Sheva 42' (Ricketts); Hatch (yellow card) 81'; Jaurena (yellow card) 86'; Sanchez 90+4' (Tanner) | Report | Hansen 10' (Cosme); Martínez (yellow card) 37'; Watt 49' (Yates) | Stadium: Audi Field; Attendance: 4,991; Referee: Joshua Encarnacion (Pennsylvania) |

| June 14, 2023 3 | Washington Spirit | 1–2 | North Carolina Courage | Washington, D.C. |
| 7:30 p.m. EDT (UTC-4) | McKeown 54' (Silano); Biegalski (yellow card) 70' | Report | Ratcliffe 62' (Tagliaferri); Wingate 90+2' (Hopkins) | Stadium: Audi Field; Attendance: 5,778; Referee: Matthew Corrigan (Oklahoma) |

| July 22, 2023 4 | North Carolina Courage | 6–0 | Washington Spirit | Cary, North Carolina |
| 7:00 p.m. EDT (UTC-4) | Ratcliffe 61'; Tagliaferri 65'; Wingate 70'; Boade 72'; Pinto 80'; Miura 83' | Report | | Stadium: WakeMed Soccer Park; Attendance: 4,063; Referee: Thomas Snyder (New York) |

| July 28, 2023 5 | Washington Spirit | 4–2 | NJ/NY Gotham FC | Washington, D.C. |
| 7:00 p.m. EDT (UTC-4) | Hatch 25'; Biegalski 55'; Hatch 63'; Ricketts 70' | Report | Purce 4'; Nighswonger 8' | Stadium: Audi Field; Attendance: 4,732; Referee: Danielle Chesky (Virginia) |

| August 4, 2023 6 | Orlando Pride | 0–1 | Washington Spirit | Orlando, Florida |
| 7:00 p.m. EDT (UTC-4) | | Report | Speckmaier 90+8' | Stadium: Exploria Stadium; Attendance: 3,661; Referee: Brad Jensen (Utah) |

==== East Division standings ====
| Pos | Team | Pld | W | T | L | GF | GA | GD | Pts | Qualification | NC | NJY | WAS | ORL |
|---|---|---|---|---|---|---|---|---|---|---|---|---|---|---|
| 1 | North Carolina Courage | 6 | 3 | 2 | 1 | 15 | 5 | +10 | 11 | Advance to knockout stage | — | 1–1 | 6–0 | 0–0 |
| 2 | NJ/NY Gotham FC | 6 | 3 | 2 | 1 | 10 | 7 | +3 | 11 | | 2–0 | — | 1–0 | 1–1 |
| 3 | Washington Spirit | 6 | 3 | 0 | 3 | 10 | 13 | −3 | 9 | | 1–2 | 4–2 | — | 4–2 |
| 4 | Orlando Pride | 6 | 0 | 2 | 4 | 5 | 15 | −10 | 2 | | 1–1 | 1–3 | 0–1 | — |

Source: NWSL

==== Results by matchday ====
| Matchday | 1 | 2 | 3 | 4 | 5 | 6 |
|---|---|---|---|---|---|---|
| Stadium | A | H | H | H | A | A |
| Result | L | W | L | L | W | W |
| Position | 3 | 2 | | | | 3 |

Updated to match(es) played on June 14, 2023. Source: NWSL
A = Away; H = Home; W = Win; D = Draw; L = Loss

=== Regular season ===
==== Matches ====
| March 26, 2023 1 | Washington Spirit | 1–0 | OL Reign | Washington, D.C. |
| 4:00 p.m. EDT (UTC-4) | Hatch (yellow card) 20'; Sullivan (yellow card) 45+4'; Rodman 54' (Bailey); Sheva (yellow card) 88' | Report | Sonnett (yellow card) 42' | Stadium: Audi Field; Attendance: 11,281; Referee: Alyssa Nichols (Mississippi) |

| March 25, 2023 2 | Racing Louisville FC | 2–2 | Washington Spirit | Louisville, Kentucky |
| 3:00 p.m. EDT (UTC-4) | Erceg 46' (Wang); Ary Borges 65' | Report | Hatch 16' (Bailey), 32' (Rodman); Metayer (yellow card) 83' (yellow-red card) 90+3'; Parsons (yellow card) 89' | Stadium: Lynn Family Stadium; Attendance: 4,861; Referee: Sergii Demianchuk (Georgia) |

| April 15, 2023 3 | North Carolina Courage | 1–2 | Washington Spirit | Cary, North Carolina |
| 7:00 p.m. EDT (UTC-4) | Kerolin 43' (pen.); Nahas (yellow card) 52'; Lussi (yellow card) 69'; Pinto (yellow card) 81' | Report | Rodman 6' (yellow card) 78'; McKeown (yellow card) 41'; Hatch 50' (pen.) | Stadium: WakeMed Soccer Park; Attendance: 5,160; Referee: Adorae Monroy (Washington) |

| April 22, 2023 4 | Washington Spirit | 0–0 | Houston Dash | Washington, D.C. |
| 7:00 p.m. EDT (UTC-4) | Brooks (yellow card) 39'; Staab (yellow card) 64' | Report | | Stadium: Audi Field; Attendance: 7,073; Referee: Elton Garcia (Texas) |

| April 29, 2023 5 | Chicago Red Stars | 1–1 | Washington Spirit | Bridgeview, Illinois |
| 7:00 p.m. CDT (UTC-5) | St-Georges 33' (Schlegel); Stevens (yellow card) 69' | Report | McKeown (yellow card) 17'; Hatch 29' (pen.); Staab (yellow card) 67' | Stadium: SeatGeek Stadium; Attendance: 3,610; Referee: Matthew Corrigan (Oklahoma) |

| May 6, 2023 6 | Washington Spirit | 3–1 | San Diego Wave FC | Washington, D.C. |
| 1:00 p.m. EDT (UTC-4) | Carle (yellow card) 26'; Rodman 55'; Sanchez 70' (Rodman); Metayer 79' (Staab) | Report | Westphal (yellow card) 27'; Morgan 90' | Stadium: Audi Field; Attendance: 12,232; Referee: Matt Thompson (Mississippi) |

| May 13, 2023 7 | Angel City FC | 0–1 | Washington Spirit | Los Angeles, California |
| 7:00 p.m. PDT (UTC-7) | Nielsen (yellow card) 38'; McCaskill (yellow card) 62'; Hammond (yellow card) 75'; Vignola (yellow card) 90+1'; Haračić (yellow card) 90+4' | Report | Hatch 90+4' (pen.) | Stadium: BMO Stadium; Attendance: 17,427; Referee: JC Griggs (Virginia) |

| May 20, 2023 8 | Orlando Pride | 2–1 | Washington Spirit | Orlando, Florida |
| 7:00 p.m. EDT (UTC-4) | Marta 23' (pen.); Strom 77' (Marta); McCutcheon (yellow card) 90+5' | Report | Rodman (yellow card) 15'; Staab 28' (Jaurena); Sullivan (yellow card) 36'; McKeown (yellow card) 83' | Stadium: Exploria Stadium; Attendance: 4,290; Referee: Thomas Snyder (New York) |

| May 28, 2023 9 | Washington Spirit | 1–1 | NJ/NY Gotham FC | Washington, D.C. |
| 5:00 p.m. EDT (UTC-4) | Metayer 69' (Hatch) | Report | Bruninha; Nighswonger (yellow card) 62'; Onumonu (yellow card) 88' | Stadium: Audi Field; Attendance: 11,545; Referee: Karen Callado (California) |

| June 3, 2023 10 | Washington Spirit | 1–1 | Racing Louisville FC | Washington, D.C. |
| 8:00 p.m. EDT (UTC-4) | Rodman 3' (Hatch); Hatch (yellow card) 39'; Bailey (yellow card) 87' | Report | DeMelo (yellow card) 45' (goal) 51' (pen.); Pikkujämsä (red card) 77'; Kgatlana (yellow card) 90+8' | Stadium: Audi Field; Attendance: 8,515; Referee: Rebecca Pagan (Illinois) |

| June 10, 2023 11 | Washington Spirit | 2–1 | Angel City FC | Washington, D.C. |
| 7:00 p.m. EDT (UTC-4) | Hatch 33'; Sanchez 41' (Metayer); Parsons (yellow card) 90+11' | Report | Vignola 45+2' (Emslie) | Stadium: Audi Field; Attendance: 10,032; Referee: Alyssa Nichols (Mississippi) |

| June 18, 2023 12 | Kansas City Current | 2–3 | Washington Spirit | Kansas City, Kansas |
| 6:00 p.m. CDT (UTC-5) | Cooper 1'; Debinha 23' (pen.) | Report | Parsons (yellow card) 24'; Sanchez 36'; Metayer 82' (Silano); McKeown 87' (Bailey) | Stadium: Children's Mercy Park; Attendance: 9,644; Referee: Natalie Simon (Florida) |

| June 23, 2023 13 | Portland Thorns FC | 4–2 | Washington Spirit | Portland, Oregon |
| 7:30 p.m. PDT (UTC-7) | Smith 11' (Coffey), 23', 47' (Sugita); Weaver 64' (Coffey) | Report | Hatch 13' (Sanchez); Sanchez 46' | Stadium: Providence Park; Attendance: 20,254; Referee: Katja Koroleva (Washington) |

| July 1, 2023 14 | Washington Spirit | 0–3 | Orlando Pride | Washington, D.C. |
| 8:19 p.m. EDT (UTC-4) | Hatch (yellow card) 76' | Report | Doyle 8', 16' (Tymrak); Abello (yellow card) 46'; McKeown 61' (o.g.); Montefusco (yellow card) 67' | Stadium: Audi Field; Attendance: 8,901; Referee: Anya Voigt (Florida) |
Note: Kickoff delayed from 7:00 p.m. by thunderstorms in the area.

| July 8, 2023 15 | San Diego Wave FC | 2–2 | Washington Spirit | San Diego, California |
| 7:00 p.m. PDT (UTC-7) | Shorts 46'; Shaw (yellow card) 70'; Kornieck 90' (Turnbow) | Report | Jaurena (yellow card) 14'; Hatch 23' (pen.); Ricketts (yellow card) 45+3'; McKeown (yellow card) 51'; Shorts 54' (o.g.); Carle (yellow card) 89' | Stadium: Snapdragon Stadium; Attendance: 14,362; Referee: Adam Kilpatrick (Massachusetts) |

| August 19, 2023 16 | Houston Dash | 1–1 | Washington Spirit | Houston, Texas |
| 7:30 p.m. CDT (UTC-5) | Sanchez 90+1' | Report | Sanchez 63' | Stadium: Shell Energy Stadium; Attendance: 4,822; Referee: Eric Tattersall (Ohio) |

| August 27, 2023 17 | Washington Spirit | 1–1 | Portland Thorns FC | Washington, D.C. |
| 5:00 p.m. EDT (UTC-4) | Hatch 90+2' (pen.) | Report | Weaver 64' | Stadium: Audi Field; Attendance: 13,048; Referee: Jeremy Scheer (Connecticut) |

| September 3, 2023 18 | Washington Spirit | 0–2 | Chicago Red Stars | Washington, D.C. |
| 5:00 p.m. EDT (UTC-4) | | Report | St-Georges 48'; Nagasato 60' | Stadium: Audi Field; Attendance: 10,035; Referee: Brandon Stevis (California) |

| September 16, 2023 19 | NJ/NY Gotham FC | 2–0 | Washington Spirit | Harrison, New Jersey |
| 7:30 p.m. EDT (UTC-4) | González 65', 70' | Report | | Stadium: Red Bull Arena; Attendance: 6,202; Referee: Adorae Monroy (Washington) |

| September 30, 2023 20 | Washington Spirit | 2–1 | Kansas City Current | Washington, D.C. |
| 7:00 p.m. EDT (UTC-4) | Sarr 19'; Rodman 90+1' | Report | Debinha 21' (pen.) | Stadium: Audi Field; Attendance: 11,607; Referee: Eric Tattersall (Ohio) |

| October 6, 2023 21 | OL Reign | 0-0 | Washington Spirit | Seattle, Washington |
| 7:00 p.m. PDT (UTC-7) | | Report | | Stadium: Lumen Field; Attendance: 34,130; Referee: Thomas Snyder (New York) |

| October 15, 2023 22 | Washington Spirit | 0-1 | North Carolina Courage | Washington, D.C. |
| 5:00 p.m. EDT (UTC-4) | Rodman (red card) 23' | Report | Lussi 25' | Stadium: Audi Field; Attendance: 15,479; Referee: Ricardo Fierro (California) |

==== Regular season standings ====
| Pos | Team | Pld | W | D | L | GF | GA | GD | Pts | Qualification |
|---|---|---|---|---|---|---|---|---|---|---|
| 6 | NJ/NY Gotham FC (C) | 22 | 8 | 7 | 7 | 25 | 24 | +1 | 31 | Playoff quarterfinals |
| 7 | Orlando Pride | 22 | 10 | 1 | 11 | 27 | 28 | −1 | 31 | |
| 8 | Washington Spirit | 22 | 7 | 9 | 6 | 26 | 29 | −3 | 30 | |
| 9 | Racing Louisville FC | 22 | 6 | 9 | 7 | 25 | 24 | +1 | 27 | |
| 10 | Houston Dash | 22 | 6 | 8 | 8 | 16 | 18 | −2 | 26 | |

Source: NWSL
Rules for classification: Tiebreakers
(C) Champions and W Champions Cup

==== Results summary ====
| Overall | | | | | | | | Home | | | | | | Away | | | | | |
| Pld | W | D | L | GF | GA | GD | Pts | W | D | L | GF | GA | GD | W | D | L | GF | GA | GD |
|---|---|---|---|---|---|---|---|---|---|---|---|---|---|---|---|---|---|---|---|
| 22 | 7 | 9 | 6 | 26 | 29 | −3 | 30 | 4 | 4 | 3 | 11 | 12 | −1 | 3 | 5 | 3 | 15 | 17 | −2 |

Last updated: October 15, 2023.
Source: NWSLsoccer.com

==== Results by matchday ====
| Matchday | 1 | 2 | 3 | 4 | 5 | 6 | 7 | 8 | 9 | 10 | 11 | 12 | 13 | 14 | 15 | 16 | 17 | 18 | 19 | 20 | 21 | 22 |
|---|---|---|---|---|---|---|---|---|---|---|---|---|---|---|---|---|---|---|---|---|---|---|
| Stadium | H | A | A | H | A | H | A | A | H | H | H | A | A | H | A | A | H | H | A | H | A | H |
| Result | W | D | W | D | D | W | W | L | D | D | W | W | L | L | D | D | D | L | L | W | D | L |
| Position | 5 | 3 | 2 | 5 | 4 | 3 | 1 | 4 | 5 | 3 | 2 | 1 | 4 | 4 | 5 | 4 | 5 | 6 | 6 | 5 | 5 | 8 |

Updated to match(es) played on October 15, 2023. Source: NWSL
A = Away; H = Home; W = Win; D = Draw; L = Loss

== Statistics ==
As of matches played July 8, 2023.

Goalscorers, per competition
| Player | | | | Goals by competition | | | |
| Pos. | No. | Nat. | Name | NWSL | Cup | Playoffs | Total |
|---|---|---|---|---|---|---|---|
| FW | 33 | (United States) USA | Ashley Hatch | 8 | 0 | — | 8 |
| MF | 10 | (United States) USA | Ashley Sanchez | 4 | 1 | — | 5 |
| FW | 2 | (United States) USA | Trinity Rodman | 4 | 0 | — | 4 |
| MF | 26 | (United States) USA | Paige Metayer | 3 | 0 | — | 3 |
| DF | 3 | (United States) USA | Sam Staab | 1 | 1 | — | 2 |
| DF | 9 | (United States) USA | Tara McKeown | 1 | 1 | — | 2 |
| MF | 25 | (Republic of Ireland) IRL | Marissa Sheva | 0 | 1 | — | 1 |
| FW | 24 | (United States) USA | Lena Silano | 0 | 1 | — | 1 |
| Own goals | | | | 1 | 0 | — | 0 |
| Total | | | | 22 | 5 | — | 27 |

Assists by player, per competition
| Player | | | | Assists by competition | | | |
| Pos. | No. | Nat. | Name | NWSL | Cup | Playoffs | Total |
|---|---|---|---|---|---|---|---|
| DF | 19 | (United States) USA | Dorian Bailey | 3 | 0 | — | 3 |
| FW | 33 | (United States) USA | Ashley Hatch | 3 | 0 | — | 3 |
| FW | 2 | (United States) USA | Trinity Rodman | 2 | 0 | — | 2 |
| FW | 24 | (United States) USA | Lena Silano | 1 | 1 | — | 2 |
| MF | 7 | (France) FRA | Inès Jaurena | 1 | 0 | — | 1 |
| MF | 26 | (United States) USA | Paige Metayer | 1 | 0 | — | 1 |
| MF | 39 | (United States) USA | Chloe Ricketts | 0 | 1 | — | 1 |
| MF | 10 | (United States) USA | Ashley Sanchez | 1 | 0 | — | 1 |
| MF | 3 | (United States) USA | Sam Staab | 1 | 0 | — | 1 |
| MF | 27 | (Panama) PAN | Riley Tanner | 0 | 1 | — | 1 |
| Total | | | | 13 | 3 | — | 16 |

Clean sheets by goalkeeper, per competition
| Player | | | | Clean sheets by competition | | | |
| Pos. | No. | Nat. | Name | NWSL | Cup | Playoffs | Total |
|---|---|---|---|---|---|---|---|
| GK | 1 | (United States) USA | Aubrey Kingsbury | 3 | 0 | — | 3 |
| Total | | | | 3 | 0 | — | 3 |

Disciplinary cards by player, per competition
| Player | | | | NWSL | | Cup | | Playoffs | | Total | |
| Pos. | No. | Nat. | Name | Booked | Sent off (straight red) | Booked | Sent off (straight red) | Booked | Sent off (straight red) | Booked | Sent off (straight red) |
|---|---|---|---|---|---|---|---|---|---|---|---|
| FW | 33 | (United States) USA | Ashley Hatch | 3 | 0 | 1 | 0 | — | | 4 | 0 |
| DF | 9 | (United States) USA | Tara McKeown | 3 | 0 | 0 | 0 | — | | 3 | 0 |
| MF | 26 | (United States) USA | Paige Metayer | 2 | 1 | 0 | 0 | — | | 2 | 1 |
| MF | 12 | (United States) USA | Andi Sullivan | 3 | 0 | 0 | 0 | — | | 3 | 0 |
| DF | 14 | (Canada) CAN | Gabrielle Carle | 2 | 0 | 0 | 0 | — | | 2 | 0 |
| MF | 7 | (France) FRA | Inès Jaurena | 1 | 0 | 1 | 0 | — | | 2 | 0 |
| FW | 2 | (United States) USA | Trinity Rodman | 2 | 0 | 0 | 0 | — | | 2 | 0 |
| DF | 3 | (United States) USA | Sam Staab | 2 | 0 | 0 | 0 | — | | 2 | 0 |
| DF | 19 | (United States) USA | Dorian Bailey | 1 | 0 | 0 | 0 | — | | 1 | 0 |
| DF | 30 | (United States) USA | Camryn Biegalski | 0 | 0 | 1 | 0 | — | | 1 | 0 |
| DF | 22 | (United States) USA | Amber Brooks | 1 | 0 | 0 | 0 | — | | 1 | 0 |
| MF | 39 | (United States) USA | Chloe Ricketts | 1 | 0 | 0 | 0 | — | | 1 | 0 |
| MF | 25 | (Republic of Ireland) IRL | Marissa Sheva | 1 | 0 | 0 | 0 | — | | 1 | 0 |
| MF | 10 | (United States) USA | Ashley Sanchez | 0 | 0 | 1 | 0 | — | | 1 | 0 |
| Total (Note: Does not include three yellow cards issued to manager Mark Parsons.) | | | | 22 | 1 | 4 | 0 | — | | 26 | 1 |

== Awards ==
=== NWSL monthly awards ===
style="text-align:left"|Best XI of the Month
| Month | Pos. | Nat. | Player | Ref. |
|---|---|---|---|---|
| March/ April | DF | (United States) USA | Sam Staab | |
| May | DF | (United States) USA | Sam Staab (2) | |

style="text-align:left"|Rookie of the Month
| Month | Pos. | Rookie of the Month | | Statline | Ref. |
|---|---|---|---|---|---|
| June | MF | (United States) USA | Paige Metayer | 1 goal, 1 assist; tied for league scoring lead among rookies (3) | |

=== NWSL weekly awards ===
As of June 29, 2023

Player of the Week
| Wk. | Pos. | Nat. | Player | Won | Ref. |
|---|---|---|---|---|---|
| 6 | FW | (United States) USA | Ashley Hatch | Nom. | |
| 10 | FW | (United States) USA | Trinity Rodman | Nom. | |
| 11 | FW | (United States) USA | Ashley Sanchez | Nom. | |
| 12 | DF | (United States) USA | Tara McKeown | Won | |

Save of the Week
| Wk. | Pos. | Nat. | Player | Won | Ref. |
|---|---|---|---|---|---|
| 4 | GK | (United States) USA | Aubrey Kingsbury | Nom. | |

== Transactions ==
=== Draft selections ===
Draft selections are not automatically signed to the team roster. The 2023 NWSL Draft was held on January 12, 2023, in Philadelphia, Pennsylvania.

2023 NWSL Draft selections, by round
| Round | Pick | Pos. | Nat. | Player | College | Status | Ref. |
|---|---|---|---|---|---|---|---|
| 3 | 26 | FW | (England) ENG | Nicole Douglas | Arizona State | Signed to a two-year contract and rostered as a midfielder. | |
| 3 | 28 | GK | (United States) USA | Lyza Bosselmann | Gonzaga | Signed to a two-year contract with an option for a third year. | |
| 3 | 30 | FW | (Panama) PAN | Riley Tanner | Alabama | Signed to a two-year contract with an option for a third year and rostered as a midfielder. | |
| 3 | 34 | FW | (United States) USA | Lena Silano | Long Beach State | Signed to a two-year contract with an option for a third year. | |
| 4 | 37 | FW | (United States) USA | Civana Kuhlmann | Colorado | Signed to a two-year contract with an option for a third year. | |
| 4 | 40 | DF | (United States) USA | Delaney Graham | Duke | Not signed; recovering from surgery. | |

=== Contracts ===
Contract expirations
| Date | Pos. | Nat. | Player | Notes | Ref. |
|---|---|---|---|---|---|
| November 15, 2022 | MF | (United States) USA | Taylor Aylmer | Contract option declined. | |
| November 15, 2022 | DF | (United States) USA | Alia Martin | Contract option declined. | |
| November 15, 2022 | DF | (United States) USA | Averie Collins | Contract expired. | |
| November 15, 2022 | GK | (Canada) CAN | Devon Kerr | Contract expired. | |
| November 15, 2022 | DF | (Mexico) MEX | Karina Rodríguez | Contract expired. | |
| November 15, 2022 | FW | (United States) USA | Audrey Harding | Contract expired. | |

Contract re-signings
| Date | Pos. | Nat. | Player | Notes | Ref. |
|---|---|---|---|---|---|
| November 15, 2022 | DF | (United States) USA | Sam Staab | Contract option exercised. | |
| November 15, 2022 | MF | (United States) USA | Jordan Baggett | Contract option exercised. | |
| November 15, 2022 | MF | (United States) USA | Dorian Bailey | Contract option exercised. | |
| November 15, 2022 | MF | (United States) USA | Bayley Feist | Contract option exercised. | |
| November 15, 2022 | MF | (United States) USA | Anna Heilferty | Contract option exercised. | |
| November 15, 2022 | FW | (United States) USA | Maddie Elwell | Contract option exercised. | |
| November 15, 2022 | FW | (United States) USA | Tara McKeown | Contract option exercised. | |
| November 30, 2022 | MF | (Republic of Ireland) IRL | Marissa Sheva | Re-signed to a one-year contract. | |
| December 8, 2022 | MF | (United States) USA | Tori Huster | Re-signed to a one-year contract. | |
| December 12, 2022 | DF | (Canada) CAN | Gabrielle Carle | Re-signed to a two-year contract with an option for a third year. | |
| December 13, 2022 | DF | (United States) USA | Camryn Biegalski | Re-signed to a one-year contract. | |
| December 19, 2022 | DF | (United States) USA | Amber Brooks | Free agent re-signed to a one-year contract. | |
| December 22, 2022 | GK | (United States) USA | Nicole Barnhart | Free agent re-signed to a one-year contract. | |
| January 16, 2023 | DF | (United States) USA | Sam Staab | Signed to a new three-year contract, replacing her previous contract. | |
| January 17, 2023 | DF | (United States) USA | Anna Heilferty | Signed to a new two-year contract with a team option for an additional year, replacing her previous contract. | |
| January 18, 2023 | MF | (United States) USA | Jordan Baggett | Signed to a new two-year contract, replacing her previous contract. | |
| January 19, 2023 | DF | (United States) USA | Tara McKeown | Re-signed to a three-year contract with an option for a fourth year. | |
| January 30, 2023 | GK | (United States) USA | Aubrey Kingsbury | Signed to a new three-year contract with an option for a fourth year. | |
| February 17, 2023 | DF | (United States) USA | Dorian Bailey | Signed to a new three-year contract, replacing her existing contract expiring after the 2023 season. | |
| June 20, 2023 | DF | (Canada) CAN | Gabrielle Carle | Signed a new three-year contract with an option for an additional year, modifying her existing contract signed in 2022. | |
| June 20, 2023 | FW | (United States) USA | Ashley Hatch | Contract option for 2024 exercised. | |
| June 20, 2023 | MF | (United States) USA | Andi Sullivan | Signed a new three-year contract with an option for an additional year, replacing her previous contract expiring in 2023. | |

=== Transfers ===
Transfers in
| Date | Pos. | Nat. | Player | Former club | Fee/notes | Ref. |
|---|---|---|---|---|---|---|
| February 7, 2023 | MF | (France) FRA | Inès Jaurena | (France) Olympique Lyon | Signed a one-year contract as a free agent. | |
| March 3, 2023 | MF | (United States) USA | Chloe Ricketts | (United States) AFC Ann Arbor | Signed a three-year contract as an under-18 player, with an option for a fourth year. | |
| June 28, 2023 | FW | (Venezuela) VEN | Mariana Speckmaier | (Iceland) Valur | Signed a short-term national team replacement contract. | |
| June 28, 2023 | DF | (United States) USA | Jordan Thompson | (United States) Gonzaga Bulldogs | Signed a short-term national team replacement contract. | |
| June 30, 2023 | FW | (France) FRA | Ouleymata Sarr | (France) Paris FC | Signed a three-year contract as a free transfer. | |
| July 5, 2023 | DF | (France) FRA | Annaïg Butel | (France) Paris FC | Free transfer; Signed a two-year contract through 2024 with an option for an additional year. | |

Transfers out
| Date | Pos. | Nat. | Player | Destination club | Fee/notes | Ref. |
|---|---|---|---|---|---|---|
| April 25, 2023 | MF | (United States) USA | Jordan Baggett | (United States) Racing Louisville FC | Traded in exchange for a second-round pick and conditional third-round pick in the 2024 NWSL Draft. | |

=== Retirements ===
Player retirements
| Date | Pos. | Nat. | Player | Ref. |
|---|---|---|---|---|
| November 2022 | MF | (United States) USA | Gaby Vincent | |
