= Civana Kuhlmann =

American professional soccer player

Personal information
- Full name: Civana Grace Kuhlmann
- Date of birth: April 14, 1999 (age 27)
- Place of birth: Aurora, Colorado, US
- Height: 5 ft 6 in (1.68 m)
- Position: Forward

Youth career
- 2012–2016: Colorado Rush

College career
Years	Team	Apps	(Gls)
2017–2021	Stanford Cardinal	62	(20)
2022	Colorado Buffaloes	19	(12)

Senior career*
Years	Team	Apps	(Gls)
2023–2024	Washington Spirit	7	(0)

International career
2013–2016	United States U17	15	(13)
2017–2018	United States U20	12	(5)
2019	United States U23	3	(0)
- * Club domestic league appearances and goals as of March 7, 2025

Civana Grace Kuhlmann (born April 14, 1999) is an American former professional soccer player who played as a forward. She played college soccer for the Stanford Cardinal and the Colorado Buffaloes before being selected by the Washington Spirit in the fourth round of the 2023 NWSL Draft.

== Early life ==
Kuhlmann is originally from Centennial, Colorado. She played youth soccer for Colorado Rush.

== College career ==
=== Stanford Cardinal ===
She played college soccer for Stanford from 2017 to 2021. Stanford reached the finals of the 2017 NCAA Division I women's soccer tournament and defeated the UCLA Bruins 3–2 in the championship match.

Kuhlmann's collegiate career was impacted by multiple injuries. In August 2019, she tore her anterior cruciate ligament (ACL) and medial meniscus, and underwent knee surgery to repair her ACL. In March 2020, she underwent a second knee surgery to repair her meniscus. Her return to soccer was further impacted by the COVID-19 pandemic; on August 11, 2020, the Pac-12 announced the postponement of all sports through the end of 2020. She was cleared in November 2020, and made her return to the field on February 19, 2021, scoring a penalty kick goal in Stanford's season-opening win against Pepperdine. Kuhlmann underwent right hip surgery in July 2021 to repair a torn labrum and a microfracture, and underwent left hip surgery in February 2022. In total, she underwent four surgeries during her college career at Stanford.

=== Colorado Buffaloes ===
In July 2022, Kuhlmann transferred to Colorado. In the 2022 season, she recorded 12 goals and six assists, totaling 30 points that tied her for second in team history with Jorian Baucom and Taylor Kornieck.

== Club career ==
On January 12, 2023, Kuhlmann was selected by the Washington Spirit as the 37th overall pick of the 2023 NWSL Draft. On March 8, she signed with the Spirit on a two-year contract with a team option for 2025. Kuhlmann made her first professional start on April 19, 2023, in Washington's 2023 NWSL Challenge Cup match against NJ/NY Gotham FC. In July 2023, she suffered a season-ending knee injury during training. Kuhlmann did not make any appearances in 2024 as she rehabbed her knee. At the conclusion of the season, the Spirit declined Kuhlmann's 2025 contract option, rendering her an NWSL free agent.

== International career ==
Kuhlmann represented the United States under-17 team at the 2013 CONCACAF Women's U-17 Championship. On October 31, 2013, she became the youngest player to score for the U.S. under-17 team. She also represented the U.S. under-17 team at the 2016 CONCACAF Women's U-17 Championship, and the 2016 FIFA U-17 Women's World Cup, becoming the first U.S. player to score a hat-trick at a FIFA U-17 Women's World Cup.

Kuhlmann also represented the United States under-20 team at the 2018 CONCACAF Women's U-20 Championship, and the United States under-23 team at the 2019 La Manga Tournament.

== Personal life ==
Kuhlmann has an older sister, Ciara, who played college soccer for Midland.

== Career statistics ==
As of March 7, 2025

Appearances and goals by club, season and competition
Club	Season	League			Cup (Note: Includes the NWSL Challenge Cup)		Playoffs (Note: Includes NWSL Playoffs)		Total	
Club	Season	Division	Apps	Goals	Apps	Goals	Apps	Goals	Apps	Goals
Washington Spirit	2023	NWSL	7	0	3	0	—		10	0
Washington Spirit	2024	NWSL	0	0	0	0	0	0	0	0
Career total			7	0	3	0	0	0	10	0

== Honors ==
Stanford Cardinal

- NCAA Division I women's soccer tournament: 2017, 2019

United States U17

- CONCACAF Women's U-17 Championship: 2016
