= Camryn Biegalski =

American soccer player (born 1998)

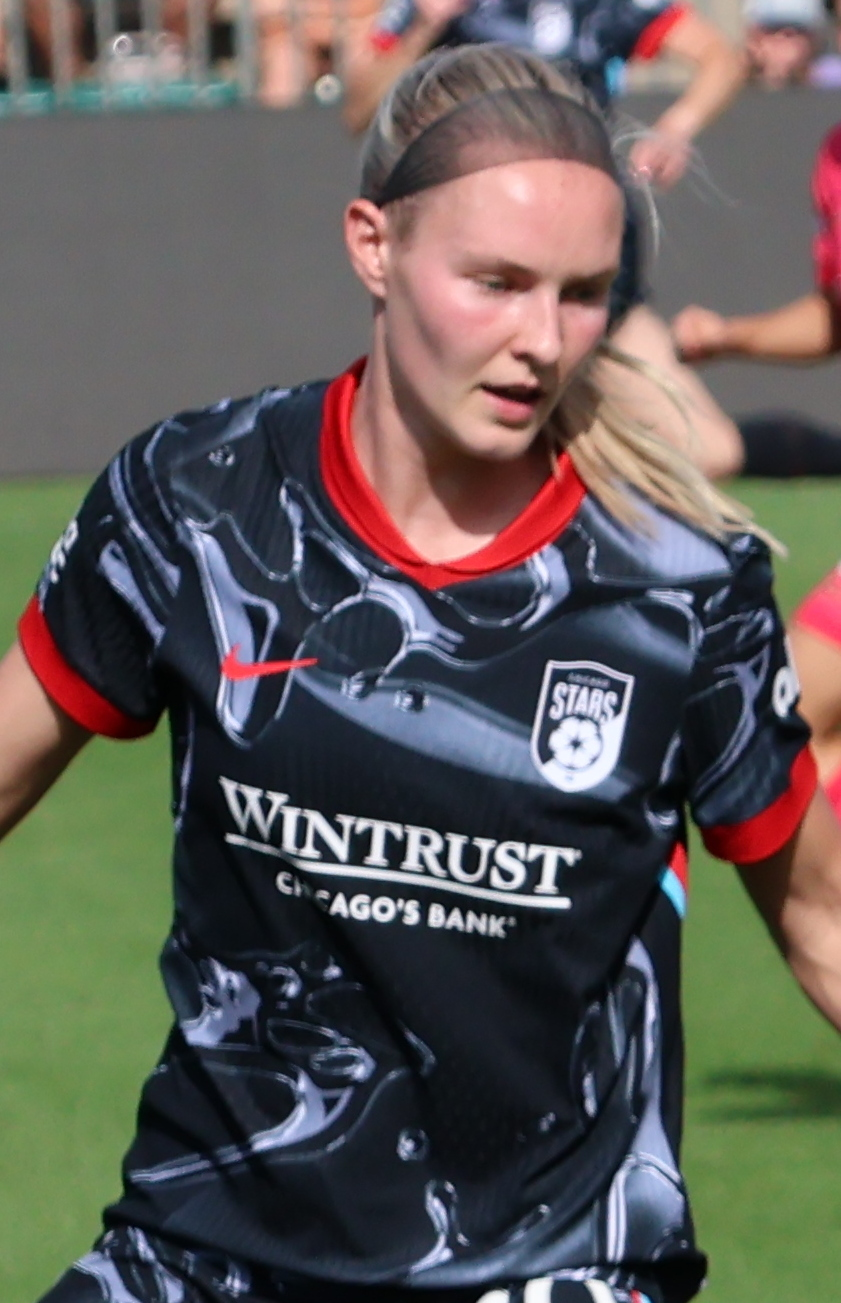
- Biegalski with the Chicago Stars in 2025

Personal information
- Full name: Camryn Ann Biegalski
- Date of birth: August 11, 1998 (age 28)
- Place of birth: Lombard, Illinois, U.S.
- Height: 5 ft 9 in (1.75 m)
- Position: Defender

Team information
- Current team: Denver Summit
- Number: 30

College career
Years	Team	Apps	(Gls)
2016–2019	Wisconsin Badgers	85	(2)

Senior career*
Years	Team	Apps	(Gls)
2020	Chicago Red Stars	0	(0)
2021–2023	Washington Spirit	35	(0)
2024–2025	Chicago Stars	27	(1)
2026–	Denver Summit	0	(0)
- * Club domestic league appearances and goals as of 04:58, November 4, 2025 (UTC)

Camryn Ann Biegalski (born August 11, 1998) is an American professional soccer player who plays as a defender for Denver Summit FC of the National Women's Soccer League (NWSL). She played college soccer for the Wisconsin Badgers and was selected by the Chicago Red Stars in the second round of the 2020 NWSL College Draft. She also previously played for the Washington Spirit.

== College career ==
Biegalski played college soccer at Wisconsin from 2016 to 2019. In 2019, she was named the Big Ten Defender of the Year.

== Club career ==
Biegalski was selected by the Chicago Red Stars in the 2020 NWSL College Draft. She made her NWSL debut on September 12, 2020.

On April 8, 2021, Biegalski signed a National Team Replacement Contract with the Washington Spirit. On May 6, she signed with Washington Spirit on a one-year contract with a one-year option. She re-signed with the Spirit in December 2022.

On January 22, 2024, after becoming a restricted free agent, Biegalski signed with the Chicago Red Stars (later named Chicago Stars FC) on a one-year contract with a mutual option. She made 27 regular season appearances across two seasons for the Stars.

In December 2025, Biegalski moved to Denver Summit FC as a free agent, penning a one-year contract with a mutual option for the expansion club.

== Career statistics ==
As of October 15, 2023

Appearances and goals by club, season and competition
Club	Season	League			Cup (Note: Includes the NWSL Challenge Cup)		Playoffs (Note: Includes NWSL Playoffs)		Other		Total	
Club	Season	Division	Apps	Goals	Apps	Goals	Apps	Goals	Apps	Goals	Apps	Goals
Chicago Red Stars	2020	NWSL	—		0	0	—		3 (Note: Includes the NWSL Fall Series)	0	3	0
Washington Spirit	2021	NWSL	9	0	3	0	0	0	—		12	0
Washington Spirit	2022	NWSL	17	0	8	0	—		—		25	0
Washington Spirit	2023	NWSL	9	0	5	1	—		—		14	1
Career total			35	0	16	1	0	0	3	0	54	1

== Honors ==
Washington Spirit

- NWSL Championship: 2021

Individual

- Big Ten Conference Defender of the Year: 2019
