= Adrián González (football manager, born 1989) =

Spanish football manager (born 1989)

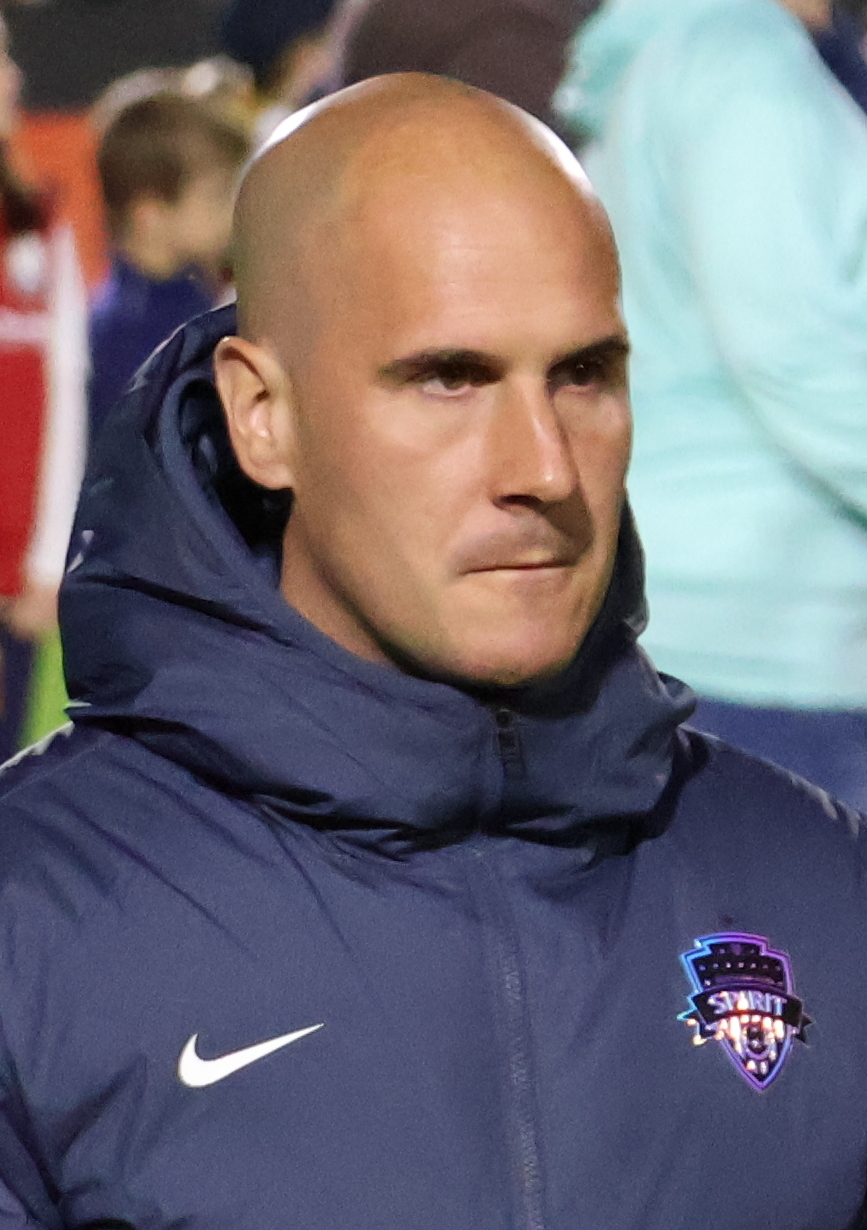
- González with the Washington Spirit in 2024

Personal information
- Date of birth: 8 July 1989 (age 37)

Team information
- Current team: Washington Spirit (head coach)

Managerial career
- Years: Team
- 2013–2017: RCD Espanyol Cadete (staff)
- 2017: Ventforet Kofu (Youth)
- 2018–2019: RCD Espanyol Juvenil A (assistant)
- 2019–2023: RCD Espanyol B (assistant)
- 2021: Xanthi F.C. (assistant)
- 2023–2024: RCD Espanyol Femení
- 2024: Washington Spirit (interim)
- 2024–2025: Washington Spirit (assistant)
- 2025–: Washington Spirit

Adrián González (born 8 July 1989) is a Spanish professional football manager who is the head coach of the Washington Spirit of the National Women's Soccer League (NWSL). He previously coached for RCD Espanyol at multiple levels, including as head coach of RCD Espanyol Femení.

== Career ==
=== RCD Espanyol ===
Having started as a youth coach for Lleida CF, González became youth coach for Cadete A in the academy of RCD Espanyol for four seasons beginning in 2013–14. Following one season overseas with Ventforet Kofu in Japan, González became an assistant coach for RCD Espanyol's Juvenil A academy team in 2018–19. He was then promoted to assist the RCD Espanyol B team led by José Aurelio Gay. He also assisted Xanthi F.C. of the Super League 2 in Greece.

On 20 July 2023, González was promoted to head coach of the RCD Espanyol women's side for the 2023–24 Primera Federación season. He announced his departure on 11 January 2024 to accept an international offer on short notice, with his last match on 21 January. The club was at the top of the Primera Federación standings when he left, with a record of 10–1–4, and went on to be promoted to the Liga F at the end of the season.

=== Washington Spirit ===
On 23 January 2024, González was announced to be the interim head coach for the Washington Spirit until incoming head coach Jonatan Giráldez would arrive from FC Barcelona after the European season ended. The Spirit won ten of its 15 games during González's stint as interim coach, which ended when Giráldez took the helm ahead of the win against Bay FC on July 6.

On 17 July 2025, González again became the Spirit's head coach, this time without the interim label, after Giráldez left to manage OL Lyonnes.

== Managerial statistics ==
As of 30 May 2026

Managerial record by team and tenure
| Team | From | To | Record | | | | | Ref. |
| Team | From | To | P | W | D | L | Win % | Ref. |
|---|---|---|---|---|---|---|---|---|
| RCD Espanyol Femení | 20 July 2023 | 22 January 2024 | 15 | 10 | 1 | 4 | 66.67 | |
| Washington Spirit (interim) | 23 January 2024 | 30 June 2024 | 15 | 10 | 1 | 4 | 66.67 | |
| Washington Spirit | 17 July 2025 | Present | 31 | 15 | 11 | 5 | 48.39 | |
| Total | | | 60 | 35 | 13 | 12 | 58.33 | |
