= Paige Metayer =

American soccer player (born 2000)

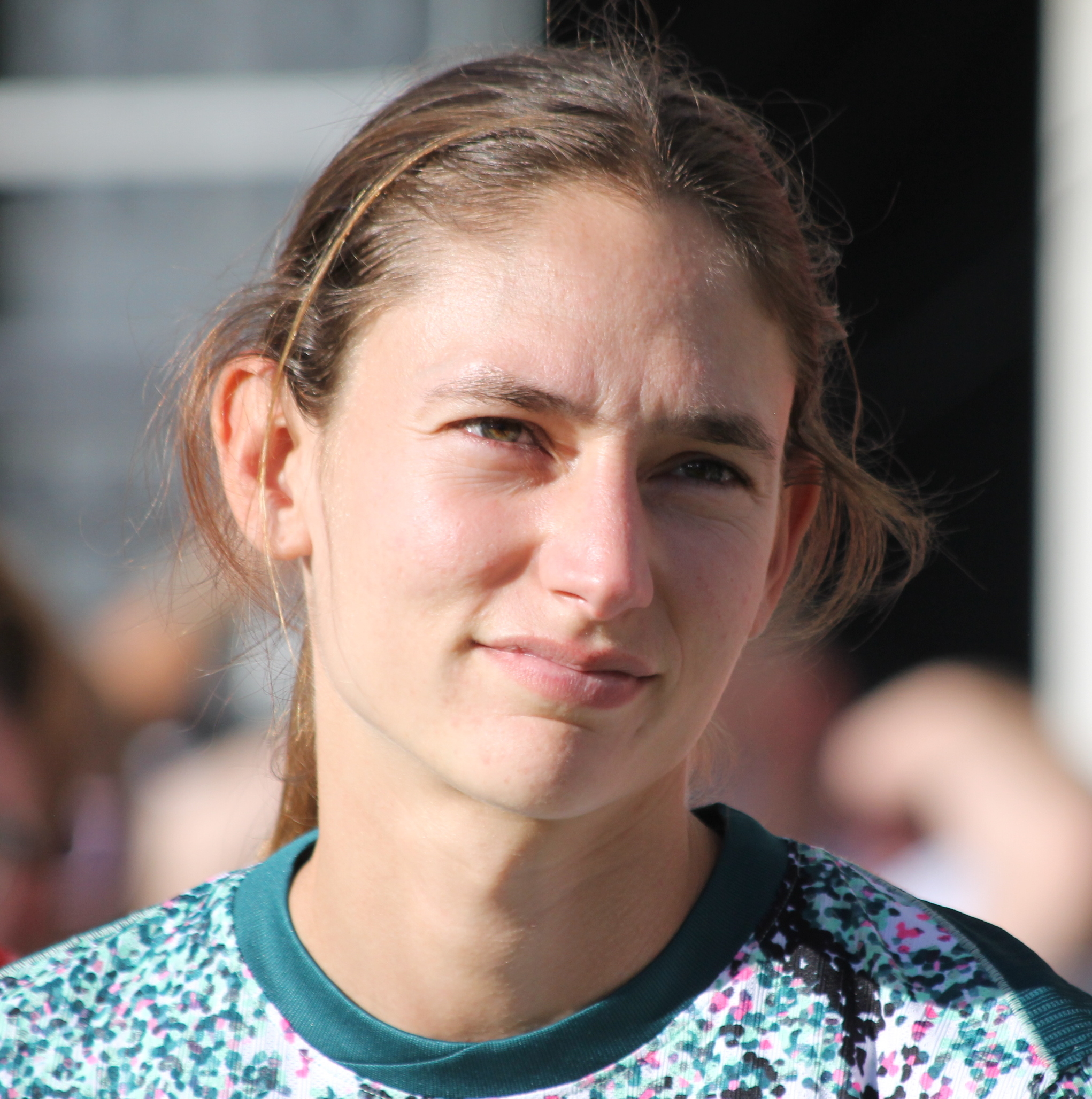
- Metayer with the Washington Spirit in 2026

Personal information
- Full name: Paige Marjorie Metayer
- Date of birth: September 23, 2000 (age 26)
- Place of birth: Irvine, California, United States
- Height: 5 ft 10 in (1.78 m)
- Positions: Right back; midfielder

Team information
- Current team: Washington Spirit
- Number: 26

Youth career
- So Cal Blues
- 2015–2018: University High School

College career
Years	Team	Apps	(Gls)
2018–2022	California Golden Bears	89	(9)

Senior career*
Years	Team	Apps	(Gls)
2023–	Washington Spirit	71	(5)
- * Club domestic league appearances and goals as of 05:27, November 15, 2026 (UTC)

Paige Marjorie Metayer (born September 23, 2000) is an American professional soccer player who plays as a right back or midfielder for the Washington Spirit of the National Women's Soccer League (NWSL). She played college soccer for the California Golden Bears and began her professional career with the Spirit in 2023.

== Early life ==
Metayer grew up in Irvine, California, and attended University High School, where she was twice named the girls' soccer team's most valuable player and set a school record in the 400-meter dash. In 2018, the school named her its girls' athlete of the year. Metayer also played youth soccer for Elite Clubs National League (ECNL) team So Cal Blues, where she appeared in three consecutive national playoffs and won the 2017 Surf Cup.

== College career ==
Metayer played NCAA Division I women's soccer for the California Golden Bears, where she scored nine goals and registered one assist in 89 matches played. She scored her first collegiate goal on September 17, 2018, against UC Davis.

At the University of California, Berkeley, Metayer studied data science and economics.

== Club career ==
After going undrafted in the 2023 NWSL Draft, Metayer joined the Washington Spirit during the 2023 preseason as a non-rostered invitee. On March 8, 2023, she signed a three-year contract with the team with an option for an additional year. She debuted for the Spirit in the team's first match of her rookie season on March 26 as a starter against OL Reign. After being the only rookie to start in the Spirit's first three matches of the season, she received a second yellow and red card ejection and one-match suspension on April 1 in a match against Racing Louisville FC.

On May 6, she scored her first professional goal in a 3–1 win against San Diego Wave FC. She also scored an equalizing header in a 1–1 draw against NJ/NY Gotham FC on May 28, assisted on Ashley Sanchez's match-winning goal against Angel City FC on June 10, and scored an equalizing goal in the Spirit's 3–2 win over Kansas City Current on June 18. On July 6, the NWSL named Metayer its June Rookie of the Month, citing her June 10 assist and June 18 goal as well as her shot-creating actions.

Metayer captained the Spirit for the first time in the club's continental debut on August 19, 2025, winning 7–0 away over Salvadoran club Alianza in the 2025–26 CONCACAF W Champions Cup group stage.

== Playing style ==
With the Washington Spirit, Metayer plays on the right side of the team's 4–4–2 diamond formation, covering defensively and serving as an aerial threat offensively. In May 2023, American women's soccer outlet The Equalizer described Metayer as a U.S. national team prospect as either a holding or box-to-box midfielder, citing her pace, positioning, footwork, and tackling.

== Career statistics ==
As of March 31, 2024

Appearances and goals by club, season and competition
Club	Season	League			Cup (Note: Includes the NWSL Challenge Cup)		Playoffs (Note: Includes NWSL Playoffs)		Total	
Club	Season	Division	Apps	Goals	Apps	Goals	Apps	Goals	Apps	Goals
Washington Spirit	2023	NWSL	21	3	6	0	—		27	3
Washington Spirit	2024	NWSL	1	0	—		—		1	0
Career total			22	3	6	0	0	0	28	3

== Honors and awards ==
Washington Spirit

- NWSL Challenge Cup: 2025

Individual

- NWSL Rookie of the Month: June 2023
