= Jenna Nighswonger =

American soccer player (born 2000)

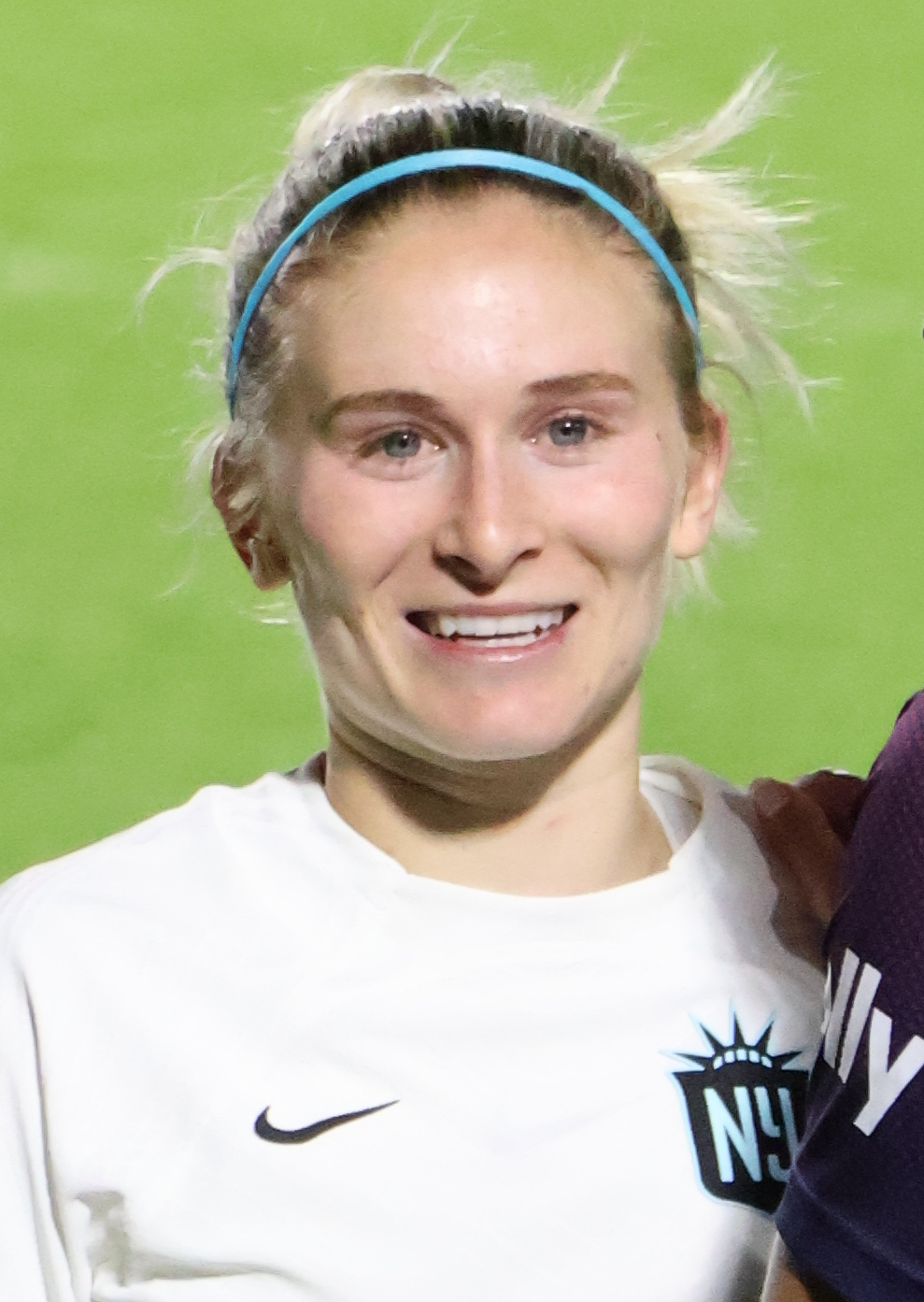
- Nighswonger with NJ/NY Gotham FC in 2023

Personal information
- Full name: Jenna Gray Nighswonger
- Date of birth: November 28, 2000 (age 25)
- Place of birth: Huntington Beach, California, United States
- Height: 1.60 m (5 ft 3 in)
- Position: Left back

Team information
- Current team: Bay FC
- Number: 31

Youth career
- 2014–2018: Slammers FC

College career
Years	Team	Apps	(Gls)
2019–2022	Florida State Seminoles	86	(19)

Senior career*
Years	Team	Apps	(Gls)
2019	LA Galaxy OC		
2023–2025	NJ/NY Gotham FC	51	(4)
2025–2026	Arsenal	5	(0)
2026	→ Aston Villa (loan)	9	(0)
2026–	Bay FC	12	(0)

International career^{‡}
2014	United States U14		
2016	United States U16		
2017–2018	United States U19	4	(1)
2019–2020	United States U20	9	(1)
2019–2022	United States U23	2	(1)
2023–	United States	20	(2)
Medal record
Women's soccer
Representing the United States
Olympic Games
Gold medal – first place	2024 Paris	Team
CONCACAF W Gold Cup
Winner	2024 United States
- * Club domestic league appearances and goals as of 16:18, 10 August 2026 (UTC) ‡ National team caps and goals as of February 26, 2025

Jenna Gray Nighswonger (/ˈnaɪswɒŋɡər/ NYE-swong-gər; born November 28, 2000) is an American professional soccer player who plays as a left back for Bay FC of the National Women's Soccer League (NWSL) and the United States national team.

Nighswonger played college soccer for the Florida State Seminoles, winning the 2021 national championship, before being drafted fourth overall by NJ/NY Gotham FC in the 2023 NWSL Draft. She was named the NWSL Rookie of the Year and lifted the NWSL Championship trophy with Gotham in her first season. She debuted for the United States senior national team in 2023. She won the gold medal with the United States at the 2024 Paris Olympics.

== Early life ==
Nighswonger played youth soccer for Slammers FC, winning a U14 ECNL National Championship. She also participated in the US Youth Soccer Olympic Development Program. Nighswonger graduated from Huntington Beach High School in December 2018. She played soccer for the school until her junior year, when she instead opted to play for a United States Soccer Development Academy club.

== College career ==
In May 2017, Nighswonger committed to play college soccer at Florida State. In 2019, she played for United Women's Soccer club LA Galaxy OC and played in the league's national championship, which LA Galaxy OC won in a 1–0 victory over Calgary Foothills WFC.

She played at Florida State from 2019 to 2022. Nighswonger made her Florida State debut on August 22, 2019, against TCU. She scored her first collegiate goal on September 1, 2019, against USC. She recorded her first brace on September 12, 2019, against Colorado.

The Seminoles reached the finals of the 2020 NCAA Division I women's soccer tournament, drawing in regulation against Santa Clara University 1–1 on Nighswonger's 63rd-minute goal before losing in a penalty shoot-out, and won the 2021 tournament. Nighswonger was especially noted for scoring Olympico goals directly from her left-footed corner kicks, including an equalizing Olympico goal in the 2022 ACC championship match, a Michigan own goal forced by an Olympico goal attempt in the 2021 NCAA Division I tournament quarterfinals, and two Olympico goals scored in separate September 2022 matches against Louisville and Boston College, the latter of which was featured on SportsCenter.

The Atlantic Coast Conference named Nighswonger the most valuable player of the 2022 ACC women's soccer tournament. Nighswonger was also voted as one of three finalists for the 2022 Hermann Trophy recognizing the nation's best collegiate players.

== Club career ==
=== NJ/NY Gotham FC ===
In November 2022, Nighswonger said she was eschewing the fifth year of NCAA eligibility granted by the association due to the COVID-19 pandemic and considering playing for a European club after finishing her career at Florida State.

Nighswonger was among the final registrants for the 2023 NWSL Draft and was considered by draft analysts as a top prospect as a midfielder. On January 13, 2023, NWSL club NJ/NY Gotham FC selected Nighswonger with the 4th overall pick in the draft.

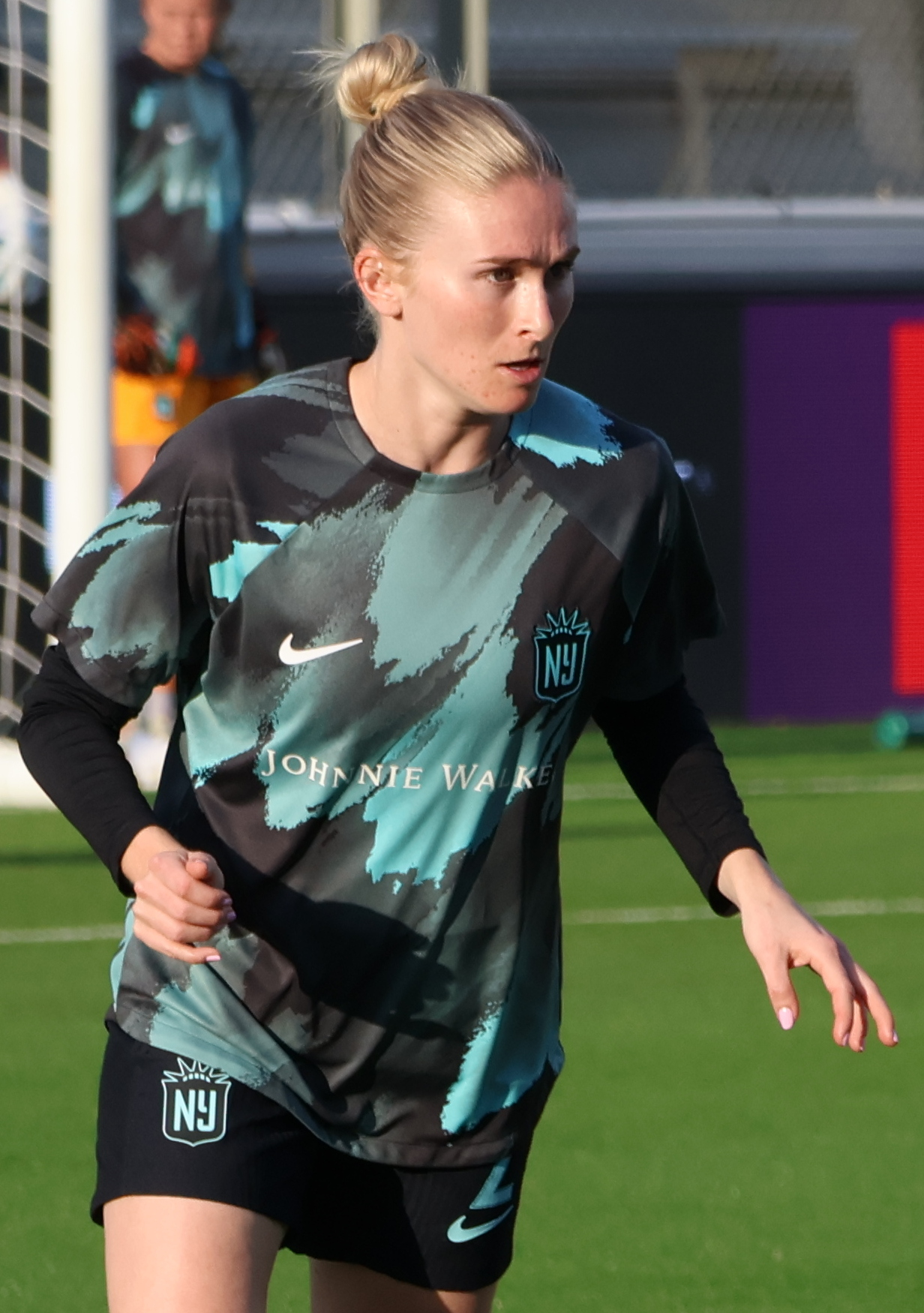
Nighswonger with Gotham in 2024

Nighswonger signed a three-year contract with Gotham FC on March 17, 2023. She made her NWSL regular-season debut with Gotham FC, substituting for an injured Ali Krieger during the club's 2023 NWSL season opener at Angel City. Though she primarily played as an attacker during her college career, head coach Juan Carlos Amorós played her at outside-back during her first professional season. She played in 20 league games, starting in 17. She scored three goals and played over 1,500 minutes during the regular season. The NWSL named Nighswonger its Rookie of the Month in May and July, making her the only player to earn the award twice. She was named Rookie of the Year on November 8, 2023. Nighswonger played in every game of the NWSL postseason, helping Gotham FC lift the NWSL Championship trophy on November 11, 2023.

=== Arsenal ===
On January 30, 2025, Nighswonger signed for Women's Super League club Arsenal. She made her debut for Arsenal in their Women's FA Cup match against London City Lionesses on February 9, participating in their 2–0 victory.

=== Aston Villa (loan) ===
On January 10, 2026, Nighswonger signed for fellow Women's Super League club Aston Villa on loan until the end of the 2025/26 season; the deal includes an option to buy. She made her debut for the club on January 25, 2026, coming on as a substitute in a 4–1 loss against Manchester United.

=== Bay FC ===
On August 10, 2026, Nighswonger returned to the NWSL, joining Bay FC for an undisclosed fee and signing a contract through 2028.

== International career ==
Nighswonger attended training camp with the United States under-14 team in 2014.

Nighswonger represented the United States under-20 team at the 2020 CONCACAF Women's U-20 Championship. She also appeared for the under-16, under-17, under-18, and under-23 teams. She was called into her first full women's national team camp November 20, 2023 and made her first appearance on December 2, 2023, in a 3–0 win against China PR. Though she was called up as a midfielder, Nighswonger played in her first national team games as an outside-back. Nighswonger earned her first start on December 5, 2023, against China PR. She scored her first goal on February 20, 2024, when she converted a penalty against the Dominican Republic during the 2024 CONCACAF W Gold Cup.

Nighswonger was selected to the 18-player roster for the 2024 Summer Olympics in France. Nighswonger played in the first five matches, coming on as substitute, and was on the bench during the gold medal match against Brazil, which the United States won 1–0 on a goal from Mallory Swanson.

== Personal life ==
Nighswonger has an older sister with whom she played recreational soccer as a child.

In 2022, Nighswonger donated $1,000 to the Breast Cancer Research Foundation, using money from her name, image, and likeness deal with Garnet & Gold.

== Career statistics ==
=== Club ===
As of match played May 16, 2026

Appearances and goals by club, season and competition
Club	Season	League			Cup (Note: Includes the NWSL Challenge Cup, Women's FA Cup)		Playoffs (Note: Includes NWSL Playoffs)		Continental (Note: Includes the CONCACAF W Champions Cup)		Total	
Club	Season	Division	Apps	Goals	Apps	Goals	Apps	Goals	Apps	Goals	Apps	Goals
NJ/NY Gotham FC	2023	NWSL	20	3	6	2	3	0	—		29	5
NJ/NY Gotham FC	2024	NWSL	26	1	1	0	2	0	4	2	33	3
NJ/NY Gotham FC	Total		46	4	7	2	5	0	4	2	62	8
Arsenal	2024–25	WSL	4	0	1	0	—		0	0	5	0
Arsenal	2025–26	WSL	1	0	0	0	—		0	0	1	0
Aston Villa (loan)	2025–26	WSL	9	0	—		—		—		9	0
Aston Villa (loan)	Total		14	0	1	0	0	0	0	0	15	0
Career total			60	4	8	2	5	0	4	2	77	8

=== International ===
As of match played February 26, 2025

Appearances and goals by national team and year
National team	Year	Apps	Goals
United States	2023	2	0
United States	2024	16	2
United States	2025	2	0
Total		20	2

Scores and results list United States's goal tally first, score column indicates score after each Nighswonger goal.

List of international goals scored by Jenna Nighswonger
No.	Date	Venue	Opponent	Score	Result	Competition	Ref.
1	February 20, 2024	Carson, California	Dominican Republic	4–0	5–0	2024 CONCACAF W Gold Cup	
2	March 3, 2024	Los Angeles, California	Colombia	2–0	3–0	2024 CONCACAF W Gold Cup	

== Honors ==
Florida State Seminoles

- NCAA Division I women's soccer tournament: 2021

NJ/NY Gotham FC

- NWSL Championship: 2023

Arsenal

- UEFA Women's Champions League: 2024–25

United States U20

- CONCACAF Women's U-20 Championship: 2020

United States

- Summer Olympic Games Gold Medal: 2024
- CONCACAF W Gold Cup: 2024
- SheBelieves Cup: 2024

Individual

- ACC women's soccer tournament MVP: 2022
- Hermann Trophy finalist: 2022
- NWSL Rookie of the Month: May 2023, July 2023
- NWSL Rookie of the Year: 2023
- NWSL Best XI Second Team: 2023
