= Ouleymata Sarr =

French footballer (born 1995)

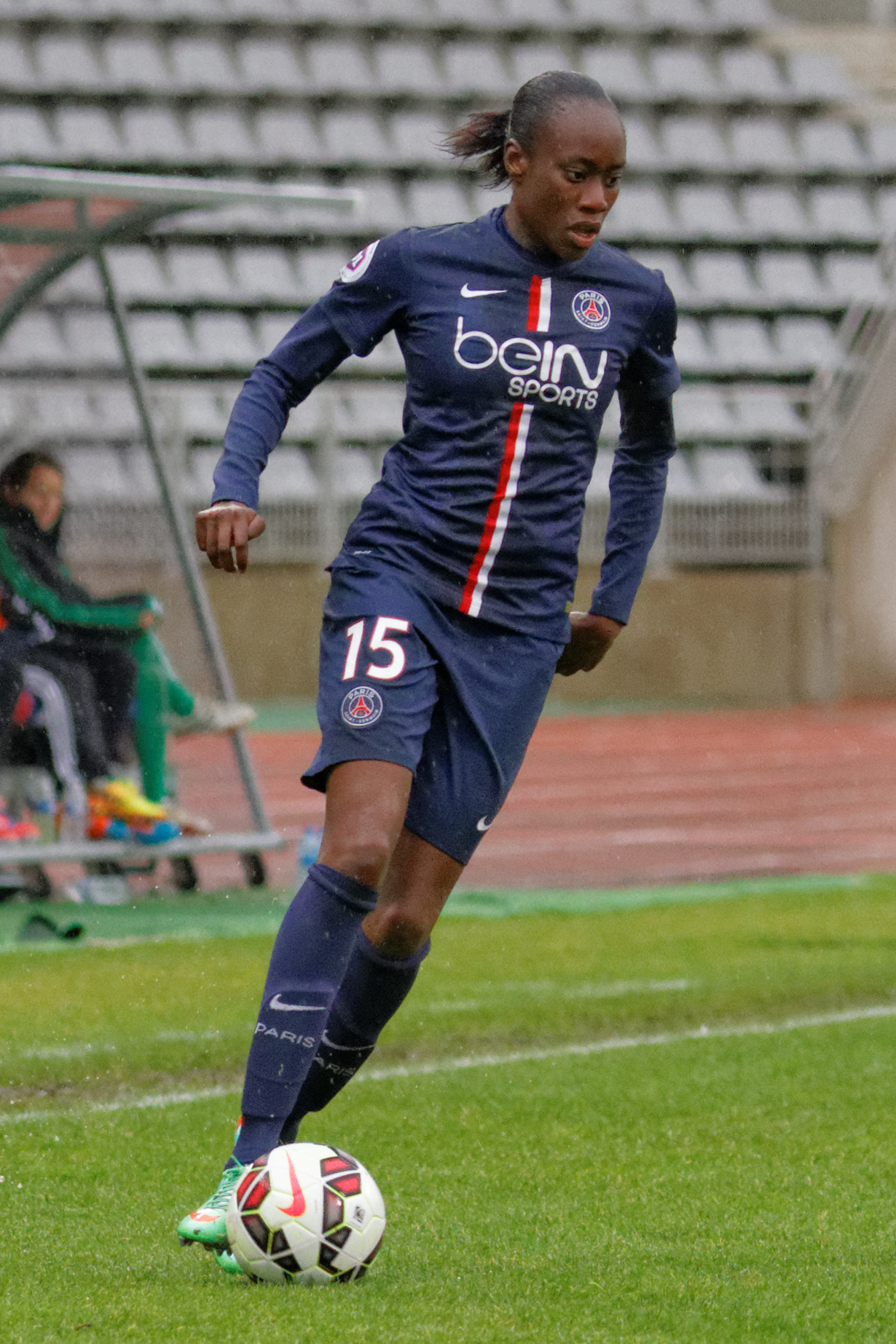
- Sarr with Paris Saint-Germain in 2014

Personal information
- Date of birth: 8 October 1995 (age 31)
- Place of birth: Cambrai, France
- Height: 1.75 m (5 ft 9 in)
- Position: Forward

Youth career
- 2005–2007: ESJM Évreux
- 2007–2011: ALM Évreux
- 2011–2013: Évreux FC 27

Senior career*
Years	Team	Apps	(Gls)
2013–2017	Paris Saint-Germain	37	(9)
2017–2019	Lille	38	(14)
2019–2021	Bordeaux	16	(6)
2021–2023	Paris FC	36	(16)
2023–2025	Washington Spirit	26	(9)

International career
2014	France U19	6	(2)
2014	France U20	8	(1)
2016–2017	France U23	8	(4)
2017–2023	France	28	(9)
- * Club domestic league appearances and goals as of 19 October 2025

Ouleymata Sarr (born 8 October 1995) is a French professional footballer who plays as a forward.

== Club career ==
Sarr spent four seasons at Paris Saint-Germain and scored in the 2014–15 UEFA Women's Champions League against Frankfurt. Prior to the 2017–18 season, Sarr transferred from PSG to Lille. She scored a hat-trick on her debut for Lille and scored a further 17 in the 2018–19 season. In 2019, Sarr signed for Bordeaux. Her 2020–21 season, which was also her last season with the Girondins, was plagued by injuries and she only played three matches. In June 2021, Sarr signed for Paris FC.

On 23 June 2023, it was announced that Sarr would transfer to the Washington Spirit after completing her contract with Paris FC. On 30 June, Sarr's contract expired, the free transfer was made official, and she signed a three-year contract with the Spirit.

== International career ==
In 2014, Sarr was called up to the French U19 team and later to the U20 team for the 2014 FIFA U-20 Women's World Cup. Sarr scored a goal in a group stage match against Costa Rica. In October 2017, Sarr scored the opening goal for the French senior team in a 8–0 win against Ghana. She was not selected for the 2019 FIFA Women's World Cup. Sarr played at UEFA Women's Euro 2022.

== Personal life ==
Sarr was born in Évreux, where she played football with boys until the age of 13 before she stopped playing for two years. She is of Mauritanian descent.

== Career statistics ==
=== International ===
As of match played 21 February 2023

Appearances and goals by national team and year
National team	Year	Apps	Goals
France	2017	6	2
France	2018	4	0
France	2019	0	0
France	2020	3	1
France	2021	0	0
France	2022	13	6
France	2023	2	0
Total		28	9

Scores and results list France's goal tally first, score column indicates score after each Sarr goal.

List of international goals scored by Ouleymata Sarr
No.	Date	Venue	Opponent	Score	Result	Competition
1	18 September 2017	Stade de l'Épopée, Calais, France	Spain	3–1	3–1	Friendly
2	23 October 2017	Stade Auguste-Delaune, Reims, France	Ghana	1–0	8–0	Friendly
3	10 March 2020	Stade du Hainaut, Valenciennes, France	Netherlands	3–3	3–3	2020 Tournoi de France
4	25 June 2022	Stade Pierre Brisson, Beauvais, France	Cameroon	3–0	4–0	Friendly
5	25 June 2022	Stade Pierre Brisson, Beauvais, France	Cameroon	4–0	4–0	Friendly
6	2 September 2022	Lilleküla Stadium, Tallinn, Estonia	Estonia	3–0	9–0	2023 FIFA Women's World Cup qualification
7	2 September 2022	Lilleküla Stadium, Tallinn, Estonia	Estonia	4–0	9–0	2023 FIFA Women's World Cup qualification
8	2 September 2022	Lilleküla Stadium, Tallinn, Estonia	Estonia	5–0	9–0	2023 FIFA Women's World Cup qualification
9	2 September 2022	Lilleküla Stadium, Tallinn, Estonia	Estonia	6–0	9–0	2023 FIFA Women's World Cup qualification

== Honors and awards ==
Washington Spirit

- NWSL Challenge Cup: 2025
