= Dawn Scott =

Association football performance coach (born 1972)

Dawn Scott (born 19 June 1972) is an English association football performance coach and sports scientist who works as director of performance for the Washington Spirit, a professional football club competing in the United States top-division National Women's Soccer League.

Scott is best known for her work with the United States women's national soccer team, where her tenure as the team's high-performance coach included two FIFA Women's World Cup victories and an Olympic gold medal. Scott was credited by player Christie Rampone as the team's "secret to everything", and by United States women's team general manager Kate Markgraf as instrumental to the team's 2012 Olympic gold medal victory. Scott has also previously worked for the England women's national football team and England's Football Association, and as performance director for Major League Soccer club Inter Miami CF.

== Early life ==
Scott was born in South Shields of Tyne and Wear county, England, and raised in the town of Washington. As a teenager, Scott played football for Whitley Bay Ladies. She initially studied physics with a goal of becoming a teacher, then played university football and studied accountancy at Sheffield Hallam before taking up sports science at Manchester Metropolitan University, where she graduated with a bachelor's of science degree in sport and exercise science. She also earned a master's degree in sports nutrition from the University of Aberdeen in 1997.

== Sports science career ==
=== Worcester University, 1997–2001 ===
Scott was a sports science lecturer and program leader on sports training, match analysis, and sports nutrition at Worcester University from 1997 to 2001.

=== The Football Association (FA), 2001–2010 ===
Scott was head of women's teams exercise science, later referred to as sports science, at The Football Association from 2001 to 2010, initially working with England women's national football team manager Hope Powell. In lieu of players having access to high-quality exercise facilities, Scott would accompany women's players to better-equipped local prisons to train.

Scott was part of the Great Britain women's football staff at the 2007 and 2009 World University Games, winning a bronze medal in the latter. She also served on the staff of England's teams in the 2002 FIFA U-19 Women's World Championship, UEFA Women's Euro 2005, 2007 FIFA Women's World Cup, 2008 FIFA U-17 Women's World Cup, and UEFA Women's Euro 2009.

=== United States national team, 2010–2019 ===
Scott joined the United States women's national soccer team in January 2010 as part of head coach Pia Sundhage's staff, and remained with the federation after the hiring of Sundhage's successors Tom Sermanni and Jill Ellis. She was part of the team's staff through the 2012 and 2016 Summer Olympics, and the 2011, 2015, and 2019 FIFA Women's World Cups.

Players, coaches, and United States Soccer Federation staff credited Scott's meticulous and detailed approach to physical fitness, recovery, injury prevention and nutrition as significant contributions to the United States's championships in the 2015 and 2019 World Cups and 2012 Olympics gold medal campaign. She championed intense measurement of player metrics toward marginal gains in performance and conditioning, the use of multi-stage fitness tests and Yo-Yo intermittent tests in elite fitness measurement, and menstruation-aware player management.

In 2016, after being prompted during a sports science conference, Scott began researching the effects of menstruation on elite athletes and worked with researcher Georgie Bruinvels. This included observations that athletes on their period suffered reduced performance, fatigue, and more severe muscular soreness. She introduced educational workshops, period tracking, reinforced by Scott with posters of phase-specific menstrual treatment strategies, was also credited as a directly contributing factor toward the United States's 2019 FIFA Women's World Cup championship as the team's second finals goal was scored by tournament Bronze Ball-winner Rose Lavelle the day after starting her period. Scott also called for increased research on potential connections between menstruation and serious injuries and advocated for more research specific to injuries among women athletes at all levels of play.

In 2017, the Journal of Sports Sciences and published Scott's first scientific research as a lead author, in a report on football training methods.

In her work with U.S. Soccer, Scott also advocated for standardized fitness testing and data collection for players in the United States top-division professional women's club league, the National Women's Soccer League (NWSL), and also added menstruation-aware educational workshops for club staff in 2019. The workshops included a focus on breaking cultural taboos around discussing menstruation, which had led to male staff sometimes leaving workshops in discomfort about the subject.

In November 2020, the Science and Medicine in Football journal published Scott's second report as a primary author, covering a two-year study of NWSL players performed in 2016 and 2017 that assessed differences in player performance between international- and domestic-level players.

Scott resigned from U.S. Soccer in November 2019 to rejoin The Football Association of her native England. Scott said she left to seek a role with more influence across youth and senior levels, which did not appear to be forthcoming in the United States.

=== FIFA (2015–) ===
Scott has served as a technical consultant to FIFA since 2015 and provided the organization with analysis of physical performances in the 2015 and 2019 Women's World Cups. As of 2019, Scott was pursuing a PhD at Western Sydney University, and by September 2021 FIFA sponsored a PhD scholarship study at Western Sydney into monitoring the effects of menstrual cycles in women's football.

=== The Football Association (2019–2020) ===
The FA re-hired Scott in November 2019 as its senior women's physical performance manager, with a stated goal of having her assist the England women's national football team, managed at the time by Phil Neville, in its preparations for the UEFA Women's Euro 2022 tournament. The FA also tasked her with managing interactions between national team players and their Women's Super League clubs.

Scott worked with Team Great Britain, which Neville also managed, at the 2020 Summer Olympics. Great Britain finished atop its group but failed to advance past the quarter-finals. At the FA, Scott also continued her work toward improving athlete awareness and fitness through menstruation-aware programs, anti-inflammatory diet, tracking, and performance analysis. England and Manchester City W.F.C. fullback Lucy Bronze credited Scott's work with improving her diet and recovery methods throughout her menstrual cycles.

Scott left The FA again in September 2020 to work with FIFA on women's physical performance strategies.

=== Inter Miami CF (2021–2022) ===
On 11 November 2021, Inter Miami CF of the United States top-division men's professional football league Major League Soccer announced that it had hired Scott as the club's performance director. Scott was charged with oversight of all levels within the club. The job reunited Scott with Phil Neville, who was now manager of Inter Miami. Scott left the role just shy of a year later.

=== Washington Spirit (2022–) ===
On 1 November 2022, National Women's Soccer League club Washington Spirit announced that it had hired Scott as its first director and vice president of performance, medical, and innovation. The club tasked Scott with developing and staffing the club's new performance department in time for the 2023 NWSL season.

== Influence in women's sport ==
Players she coached on fitness suggested Scott had guided them to their highest fitness levels of their careers, including Casey Stoney, Sue Smith, Jill Scott, and Heather O'Reilly.

United States forward Tobin Heath credited Scott with improving the United States national team's culture, and while accepting the 2019 The Best FIFA Women's Player award, United States forward Megan Rapinoe thanked Scott in her acceptance speech and said she "wouldn't have received this award without them". On the August 2021 announcement of Scott's second departure from The FA, England forward Nikita Parris predicted that should England win the UEFA Women's Euro 2022 tournament, Scott's influence would be a key reason for the victory; England would go on to win the UEFA Women's Euro 2022 final 11 months later.

In her initial tenure with The FA, Scott introduced many of her players to weight training. Scott helped to popularize the use of advanced bra-embedded GPS trackers, at the time used primarily by individual athletes and NBA and NFL teams, and other wearable activity trackers in women's football to capture and analyze match data and manage player load.

While the United States women's soccer team was not the first elite sports team to implement period tracking and tailor training around menstrual cycles, the United States's success at the 2019 Women's World Cup and corresponding coverage of Scott's menstruation-aware regimens inspired more women's sports teams to adopt the practice. Chelsea F.C. Women implemented menstruation-aware training schedules beginning in August 2019, with the club using technology developed by Georgie Bruinvels, Scott's collaborator with the United States national team. UEFA Women's Champions League winners Olympique Lyonnais Féminin followed suit, extending the practice into their youth system. AFL Women's Australian rules football team Brisbane Lions implemented menstrual cycle tracking toward managing diet and training in February 2020, citing the United States's association football success.

== Personal life ==
Scott was a season ticket holder for hometown club Newcastle United. As of 2015, her mother and sisters continued to live in Washington, Tyne and Wear. Her father died in 2012.

== In popular culture ==
In 2016, Scott trained Vogue fashion journalist and editor Hamish Bowles as a footballer for a feature story.

In 2020, Scott featured on the CBS science-focused television series Mission Unstoppable, where she demonstrated how the United States women's national soccer team trains.
