= Maddie Elwell =

American soccer player (born 1999)

Personal information
- Full name: Madison Sarah Elwell
- Date of birth: September 6, 1999 (age 27)
- Place of birth: Ambler, Pennsylvania
- Height: 5 ft 9 in (1.75 m)
- Position: Midfielder

College career
Years	Team	Apps	(Gls)
2017–2021	Vanderbilt Commodores	97	(12)

Senior career*
Years	Team	Apps	(Gls)
2022–2023	Washington Spirit	14	(1)
- * Club domestic league appearances and goals

Madison Sarah Elwell is an American former professional soccer player. She played college soccer for the Vanderbilt Commodores before selected by the Washington Spirit in the 2022 NWSL Draft.

== College career ==
A native of Ambler, Pennsylvania, Elwell attended Vanderbilt University from 2017 to 2022 before being drafted by the Washington Spirit. While at Vanderbilt, Elwell scored 12 goals and notched 29 assists during her five seasons. She earned Second Team All-SEC honors in her final three seasons at Vanderbilt.

== Club career ==
Elwell was drafted with the 15th overall pick by the Washington Spirit in the 2022 NWSL Draft. During the 2022 season, she appeared in 10 matches and played for 300 minutes. On June 17, 2022, Elwell scored her first NWSL goal against Racing Louisville.On November 20, 2023, Elwell was waived by the Spirit.
