= Alyssa Pennington =

American soccer referee (born 1996)

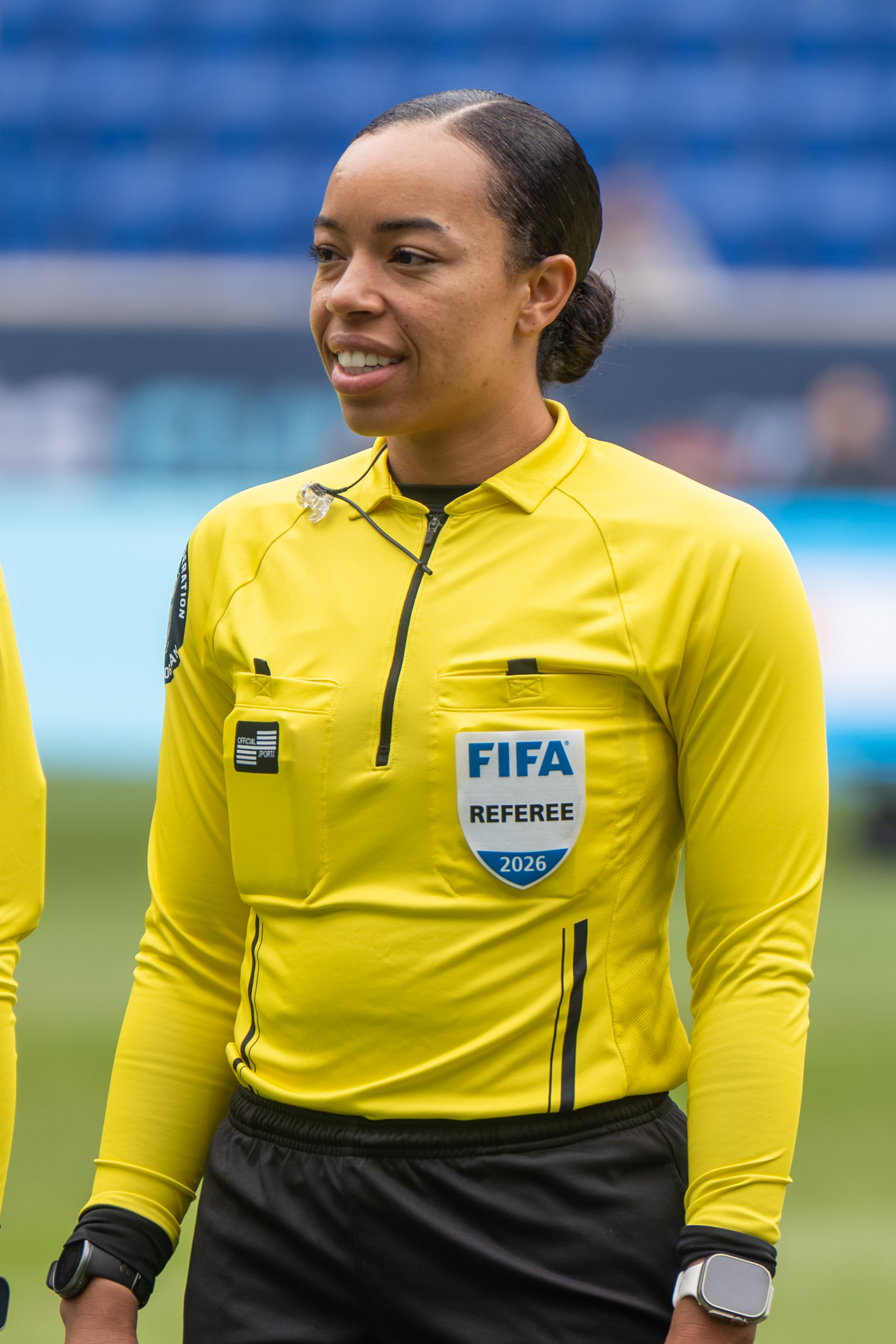
- Pennington in 2026
- Born: Alyssa Pennington; January 15, 1996 (age 30); Jackson, Mississippi, United States

Domestic
Years	League	Role

Alyssa Pennington (born January 15, 1996) is an American soccer referee.

== Early life ==
Pennington was born on January 15, 1996, in Jackson, Mississippi, to Pearl and Andrew Pennington. She attended Murrah High School in Jackson, where she was a member of the school soccer team. Pennington went on to earn her undergraduate degree in chemistry from Jackson State University, joining the Delta Sigma Theta sorority and graduating magna cum laude.

== Refereeing ==
Pennington started refereeing at the age of 17. She became the first woman from Mississippi to receive a national referee license from the United States Soccer Federation when she was 23 years old. In January 2023, Pennington became the youngest Black woman, as well as the first woman from Mississippi, to earn a FIFA referee badge. Pennington worked the 2024 NWSL Championship and was named the 2026 NWSL referee of the year.

== Personal life ==
Pennington has lived in Tampa, Florida, United States.
