= Annaïg Butel =

French footballer (born 1992)

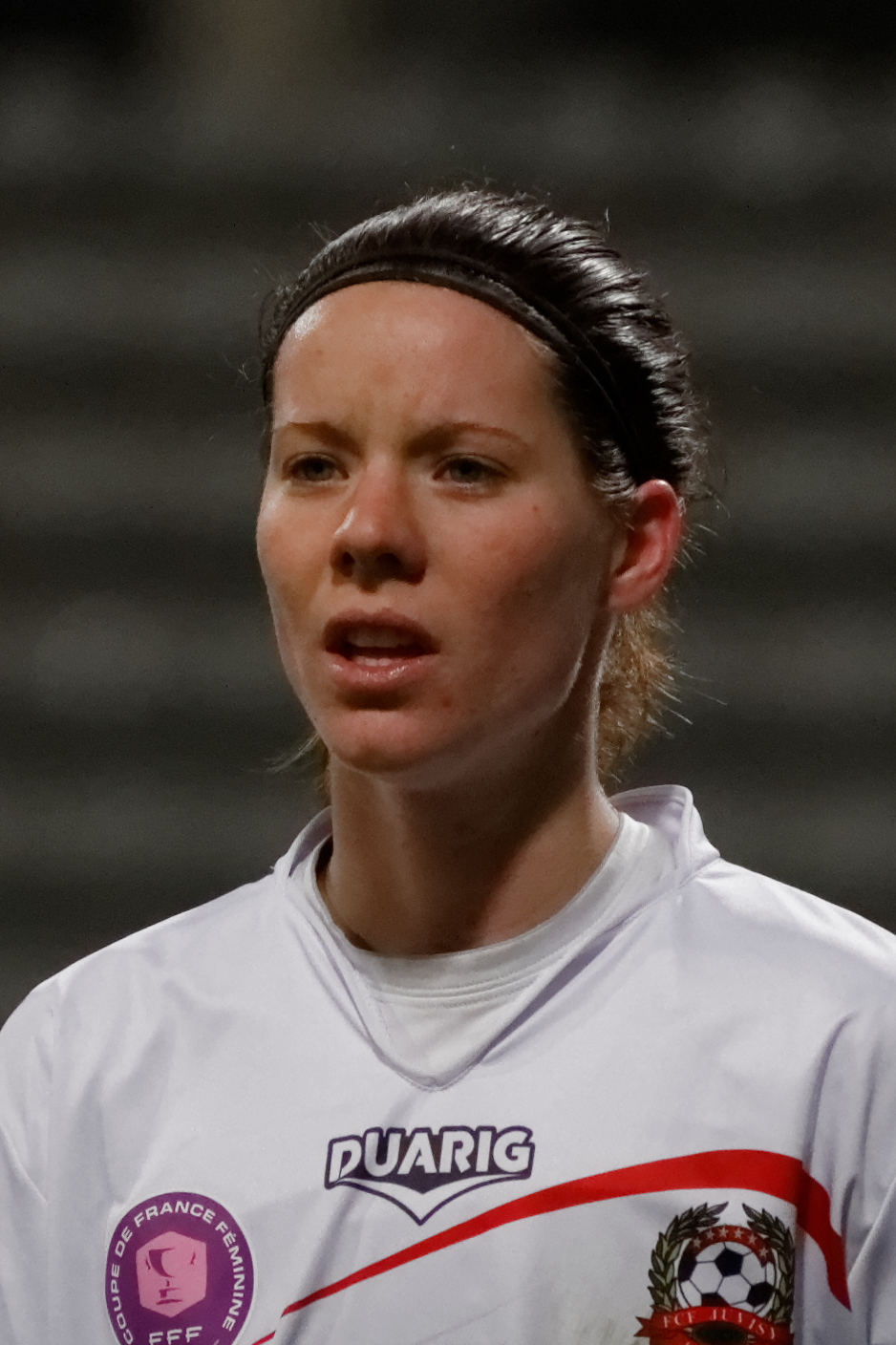
- Butel with Juvisy in 2013

Personal information
- Full name: Annaïg Charlotte Thérese Butel
- Date of birth: 15 February 1992 (age 34)
- Place of birth: Ivry-sur-Seine, France
- Height: 1.67 m (5 ft 6 in)
- Positions: Defender; midfielder

Team information
- Current team: FC Fleury 91
- Number: 10

Youth career
- 2000–2004: Château Landon
- 2004–2007: Bagneaux Nemours

Senior career*
Years	Team	Apps	(Gls)
2007–2008	Juvisy B	15	(5)
2008–2023	Paris FC (Note: Known as Juvisy till July 2017.)	272	(10)
2023–2024	Washington Spirit	32	(0)
2025–	FC Fleury 91	18	(1)

International career
2007–2009	France U17	23	(0)
2009–2011	France U19	20	(0)
2010	France U20	3	(0)
2014–2018	France U23	8	(2)
2013–2018	France	10	(0)
Medal record
Women's football
Representing France
UEFA Women's Under-19 Championship
Winner	2010 Macedonia
UEFA Women's Under-17 Championship
Third place	2009 Switzerland
- * Club domestic league appearances and goals as of 05:11, 13 June 2026 (UTC)

Annaïg Charlotte Thérese Butel (born 15 February 1992) is a French professional footballer who plays as a defender for FC Fleury 91 in the Première Ligue. She has formerly played for National Women's Soccer League club Washington Spirit and Paris FC.

== Club career ==
She previously played for French club Paris FC.

On 6 July 2023, National Women's Soccer League club Washington Spirit signed Butel until the end of 2024. She made her club debut on 4 August, substituting late against the Orlando Pride in the Challenge Cup group stage. The following year, Butel established herself as the primary center back partner of Tara McKeown as the Spirit finished the season in second place.

At the end of 2024, Butel's contract with the Spirit expired, rendering her a free agent. In January 2025, she returned to the Première Ligue and signed with FC Fleury 91.

== International career ==
She has starred for several youth women's international teams for France. In 2010, Butel played for the under-19 team that won the 2010 UEFA Women's Under-19 Championship.

== Personal life ==
Butel is the younger sister of fellow footballer Gwenaëlle Butel.

== Career statistics ==
=== International ===
As of match played 1 September 2018

Appearances and goals by national team and year
National team	Year	Apps	Goals
France	2013	1	0
France	2014	2	0
France	2015	5	0
France	2016	1	0
France	2017	0	0
France	2018	1	0
Total		10	0
