= NWSL Rookie of the Month =

The National Women's Soccer League Rookie of the Month is a monthly women's soccer award given to individual players in the National Women's Soccer League (NWSL) participating in their first season as a professional.

== Selection ==
In 2022, the winner was selected by the NWSL Media Association, an organization of journalists who regularly cover the league. Since 2023, the winner is selected by the NWSL Media Association and the league's broadcast talent.

== Winners ==
=== 2022 ===
Month	Pos.	Nat.	Player	Club	Statline	Ref.
May	DF	(United States) USA	Naomi Girma	San Diego Wave FC	85% passing, 27 clearances, 4 blocks, 9 interceptions	
June	MF	(United States) USA	Sam Coffey	Portland Thorns FC	85% passing led league in June; 6 shots, 1 assist	
July	MF	(United States) USA	Savannah DeMelo	Racing Louisville FC	2 goals; leads all rookies in minutes played through July 31	
August	FW	(Mexico) MEX	Diana Ordóñez	North Carolina Courage	5 goals, including 2 braces	
September/ October	DF	(United States) USA	Naomi Girma (2)	San Diego Wave FC	Two shutouts, captained team vs. NC	

=== 2023 ===
Month	Pos.	Nat.	Player	Club	Statline	Ref.
March/ April	FW	(United States) USA	Alyssa Thompson	Angel City FC	Scored 11' into debut; 2G in 6 matches	
May	MF/DF	(United States) USA	Jenna Nighswonger	NJ/NY Gotham FC	2 goals, 1 assist, 16 duels won	
June	MF	(United States) USA	Paige Metayer	Washington Spirit	1 goal, 1 assist; tied for league scoring lead among rookies (3)	
July	MF/DF	(United States) USA	Jenna Nighswonger (2)	NJ/NY Gotham FC	2 regular season goals; 2 Challenge Cup goals and assists	
August	FW	(United States) USA	Messiah Bright	Orlando Pride	Brace vs. NCC; 3 goals in 4 matches	
September/ October	FW	(United States) USA	Alexa Spaanstra	Kansas City Current	2 goals vs. NJY	

=== 2024 ===
Month	Pos.	Nat.	Player	Club	Statline	Ref.
March/ April	MF	(United States) USA	Croix Bethune	Washington Spirit	3 goals, 1 assist	
May	MF	(United States) USA	Croix Bethune (2)	Washington Spirit	1 goal, 7 assists	
June	MF	(United States) USA	Croix Bethune (3)	Washington Spirit	1 goal, 1 assists	
July	MF	(United States) USA	Ally Sentnor	Utah Royals	3 goals, 1 assist	
August	MF	(United States) USA	Croix Bethune (4)	Washington Spirit	Tied single-season assists record	
September	DF	(United States) USA	Kennedy Wesley	San Diego Wave FC	1 goal, 85.66% passing, 20 clearances	
October/ November	FW	(United States) USA	Makenna Morris	Washington Spirit	3 goals, 1 assist; only multi-goal match by a rookie this season	

=== 2025 ===
Month	Pos.	Nat.	Player	Club	Statline	Ref.
March	MF	(United States) USA	Maggie Graham	Houston Dash	2 goals	
April	FW	(United States) USA	Riley Tiernan	Angel City FC	2 goals	
May	FW	(United States) USA	Riley Tiernan (2)	Angel City FC	Brace vs. WAS; 3 goals	
June	FW	(United States) USA	Pietra Tordin	Portland Thorns	2 goals in 3 games	
August	FW	(United States) USA	Pietra Tordin (2)	Portland Thorns	1 goal, 1 assist	
September	MF	(Nigeria) NGA	Deborah Abiodun	Washington Spirit	Led club in tackles, duels won	
October/November	MF	(United States) USA	Taylor Huff	Bay FC	Started every game this season; led rookies in corners taken	

=== 2026 ===
Month	Pos.	Nat.	Player	Club	Statline	Ref.
March	MF	(United States) USA	Lia Godfrey	San Diego Wave FC	3 goals	
April	FW	(United States) USA	Jordynn Dudley	Gotham FC	1 goal, 1 assist	
May	MF	(United States) USA	Kat Rader	Houston Dash	2 goals	
July	MF	(United States) USA	Linda Ullmark	Houston Dash	2 goals, 2 assists	
August	MF	(United States) USA	Kat Rader (2)	Houston Dash	3 goals	

== Multiple winners ==
As of September 3, 2026

The below table lists players who have won on more than one occasion.

**Bold**	Indicates current NWSL player

Rank	N.	Player	Year	Team(s)	Wins
1	(United States)	**Croix Bethune**	2024	Washington Spirit	4
2	(United States)	Naomi Girma	2022	San Diego Wave FC	2
2	(United States)	**Jenna Nighswonger**	2023	NJ/NY Gotham FC	2
2	(United States)	**Riley Tiernan**	2025	Angel City FC	2
2	(United States)	**Kat Rader**	2026	Houston Dash	2
2	(United States)	**Pietra Tordin**	2025	Portland Thorns FC	2

== See also ==
- List of sports awards honoring women
- NWSL Player of the Week
- NWSL Player of the Month
- NWSL Team of the Month
- NWSL awards
- NWSL records and statistics
- Women's soccer in the United States
