= Lyza Jessee =

American soccer player (born 2001)

Personal information
- Birth name: Lyza Lyn Bosselmann
- Date of birth: July 27, 2001 (age 25)
- Place of birth: Flagstaff, Arizona, U.S.
- Height: 5 ft 10 in (1.78 m)
- Position: Goalkeeper

College career
| Years | Team | Apps | (Gls) |
| 2019–2022 | Gonzaga Bulldogs | 61 | (0) |

Senior career*
| Years | Team | Apps | (Gls) |
| 2023–2025 | Washington Spirit | 1 | (0) |
- * Club domestic league appearances and goals as of 02:31, January 18, 2026 (UTC)

Lyza Lyn Jessee (née Bosselmann; born July 27, 2001) is an American former professional soccer player who played as a goalkeeper. She played college soccer for the Gonzaga Bulldogs before spending three professional seasons with the Washington Spirit of the National Women's Soccer League (NWSL).

== College career ==
Jessee attended Gonzaga University where she played as goalkeeper for the university. In the 2022 season, she started all of Gonzaga's 18 matches and posted 10 shutouts. Over Bosselmann's four years, she allowed the fewest number of goals (47) in program history. She earned All-West Region and First Team All-WCC honors in her final season at Gonzaga and was also named Academic All-District and Academic All-WCC.

== Club career ==
In March 2023, Jessee was the 28th overall pick in the 2023 NWSL Draft by the Washington Spirit. She signed a two-year contract with an option for 2025 and is the backup keeper behind Aubrey Kingsbury. She spent three seasons at Washington before announcing her retirement on January 17, 2026. She had made one professional appearance, coming on as a substitute for Kingsbury after the latter received a red card in the Spirit's season-opening loss to the Seattle Reign on March 17, 2024.

== Personal life ==
She married her husband, professional baseball player Brody Jessee, on December 15, 2024.

== Honors and awards ==
Washington Spirit

- NWSL Challenge Cup: 2025

Individual

- WCC Goalkeeper of the Year: 2022
