= List of Denver Summit FC players =

Denver Summit FC is an American professional women's soccer club which began play in the National Women's Soccer League (NWSL) in 2026 as an expansion team. All rostered players during the NWSL season, including the playoffs, even if they did not make an appearance, are listed below.

== Key ==
- The list is ordered alphabetically.
- Appearances as a substitute are included.
- Statistics are correct as of November 1, 2026, the end of the 2026 NWSL season, and are updated once a year after the conclusion of the NWSL season.
- Players whose names are highlighted in **bold** were active players on the Denver Summit roster as of the list's most recent update.

Positions key
GK	Goalkeeper
DF	Defender
MF	Midfielder
FW	Forward

Nationality
Unless otherwise noted, the nationality of a player is determined by the country they most recently represented in international play, or if said player has not played international football then by their country of birth.
Position
Playing positions are listed according to the player's roster designation as of the list's most recent update.
Years
Years are defined as the first and last calendar years in which the player was rostered for the club in any of the competitions listed below.
Appearances and goals
This list counts appearances and goals in the National Women's Soccer League and NWSL Playoffs.

== Players ==
Yrs	No.	Pos	Nat	Player	Total		NWSL		Playoffs		Cup	
Yrs	No.	Pos	Nat	Player	Apps	Goals	Apps	Goals	Apps	Goals	Apps	Goals
2026–	12	FW	(United States) USA	Jasmine Aikey	0	0	0	0	0	0	0	0
2026–	36	GK	(United States) USA	Kat Asman	3	0	3	0	0	0	0	0
2026–	15	MF	(United States) USA	Jordan Baggett	0	0	0	0	0	0	0	0
2026–	30	DF	(United States) USA	Camryn Biegalski	0	0	0	0	0	0	0	0
2026–	34	MF	(United States) USA	Meg Boade	0	0	0	0	0	0	0	0
2026–	13	DF	(England) ENG	Gemma Bonner	0	0	0	0	0	0	0	0
2026	19	MF	(Mexico) MEX	Lourdes Bosch	0	0	0	0	0	0	0	0
2026–	11	FW	(United States) USA	Ally Brazier (Note: Brazier was the Summit's inaugural signing, announced on August 13, 2025.)	18	1	18	1	0	0	0	0
2026–	20	FW	(Cameroon) CMR	Naomi Eto	2	0	2	0	0	0	0	0
2026–	26	FW	(England) ENG	Natasha Flint	28	8	28	8	0	0	0	0
2026–	23	DF	(United States) USA	Eva Gaetino	24	1	24	1	0	0	0	0
2026–	79	FW	(Spain) ESP	Nahikari García	1	0	1	0	0	0	0	0
2026–	10	MF	(United States) USA	Lindsey Heaps	13	7	13	7	0	0	0	0
2026–	25	FW	(Germany) GER	Melissa Kössler (Note: Kössler scored the Summit's first-ever goal, in a match against Bay FC on March 14, 2026.)	28	8	28	8	0	0	0	0
2026–	3	DF	(United States) USA	Kaleigh Kurtz	30	1	30	1	0	0	0	0
2026–	5	MF	(United States) USA	Devin Lynch	29	0	29	0	0	0	0	0
2026–	14	MF	(United States) USA	Yuna McCormack	20	0	20	0	0	0	0	0
2026–	4	DF	(United States) USA	Natalie Means	26	1	26	1	0	0	0	0
2026–	17	GK	(United States) USA	Jordan Nytes	0	0	0	0	0	0	0	0
2026–	7	DF	(United States) USA	Ayo Oke	29	0	29	0	0	0	0	0
2026–	21	GK	(France) FRA	Pauline Peyraud-Magnin	0	0	0	0	0	0	0	0
2026–	16	DF	(United States) USA	Carson Pickett	14	0	14	0	0	0	0	0
2026–	8	MF	(Canada) CAN	Emma Regan	26	0	26	0	0	0	0	0
2026–	2	DF	(Canada) CAN	Megan Reid	13	0	13	0	0	0	0	0
2026–	9	FW	(United States) USA	Yazmeen Ryan	29	7	29	7	0	0	0	0
2026–	24	MF	(United States) USA	Delanie Sheehan	28	2	28	2	0	0	0	0
2026–	1	GK	(United States) USA	Abby Smith	27	0	27	0	0	0	0	0
2026–	6	DF	(Canada) CAN	Janine Sonis	29	12	29	12	0	0	0	0
2026–	33	FW	(United States) USA	Olivia Thomas	24	2	24	2	0	0	0	0
2026–	18	FW	(Japan) JPN	Yuzuki Yamamoto	14	3	14	3	0	0	0	0

== By nationality ==
In total, 30 players representing 8 countries have played for the Denver Summit.

Note: Countries indicate national team as defined under FIFA eligibility rules. Players may hold more than one non-FIFA nationality.

Country	Total players
Cameroon	1
Canada	3
England	2
France	1
Germany	1
Japan	1
Mexico	1
United States	19

== See also ==
- List of top-division football clubs in CONCACAF countries
- List of professional sports teams in the United States and Canada
