= List of foreign NWSL players =

This is a list of foreign players in the National Women's Soccer League (NWSL). The following players:

1. Have played at least one NWSL regular season game. Players who were signed by NWSL clubs but did not play in any competitive games, or played only in playoff, cup, friendly, or 2020 NWSL Fall Series matches are not included.
2. Are not eligible to play for the United States women's national soccer team.

More specifically,
- If a player has been capped on international level, the national team is used. If they have been capped by more than one country, the highest level (or the most recent) team is used. These include American players with dual citizenship.
- If a player has not been capped on international level, their country of birth is used, except for those who were born abroad to American parents or moved to the United States at a young age, and who also clearly indicated to have switched their nationality to another nation.

As of December 2025, players in the NWSL have represented 57 foreign national teams.

Players listed in bold are currently signed to an NWSL roster.

== Africa (CAF) ==
=== Algeria ===
- Ghoutia Karchouni – Boston Breakers (2016)
- **Mélissa Bethi** – **Washington Spirit (2026–)**

=== Angola ===
- **Flora Marta Lacho** – **Kansas City Current (2025–)**

=== Burkina Faso ===
- Alimata Bélem – Washington Spirit (2026)

=== Cameroon ===
- Michaela Abam – Sky Blue FC (2018), Houston Dash (2021–2023)
- Estelle Johnson – Western New York Flash (2013), Washington Spirit (2015–2018), Gotham FC (2019–2022), North Carolina Courage (2023–2024)
- Ajara Nchout – Western New York Flash (2015)
- **Monique Ngock** – **Washington Spirit (2026–)**
- **Maëva Nyadjou** – **Kansas City Current (2026–)**

=== Equatorial Guinea ===
- Genoveva Añonman – Portland Thorns FC (2015)

=== Ghana ===
- Elizabeth Addo – Seattle Reign FC (2018)
- Jennifer Cudjoe – Gotham FC (2020–2022)
- Princess Marfo – Bay FC (2024)
- Stella Nyamekye – Gotham FC (2025)

=== Ivory Coast ===
- **Rosemonde Kouassi** – **Washington Spirit (2024–)**

=== Kenya ===
- Mwanalima Adam Jereko – Kansas City Current (2024–2025)

=== Malawi ===
- **Temwa Chawinga** – **Kansas City Current (2024–)**

=== Mali ===
- **Aissata Traoré** – **Boston Legacy FC (2026–)**

=== Morocco ===
- Rosella Ayane – Chicago Red Stars (2024)

=== Nigeria ===
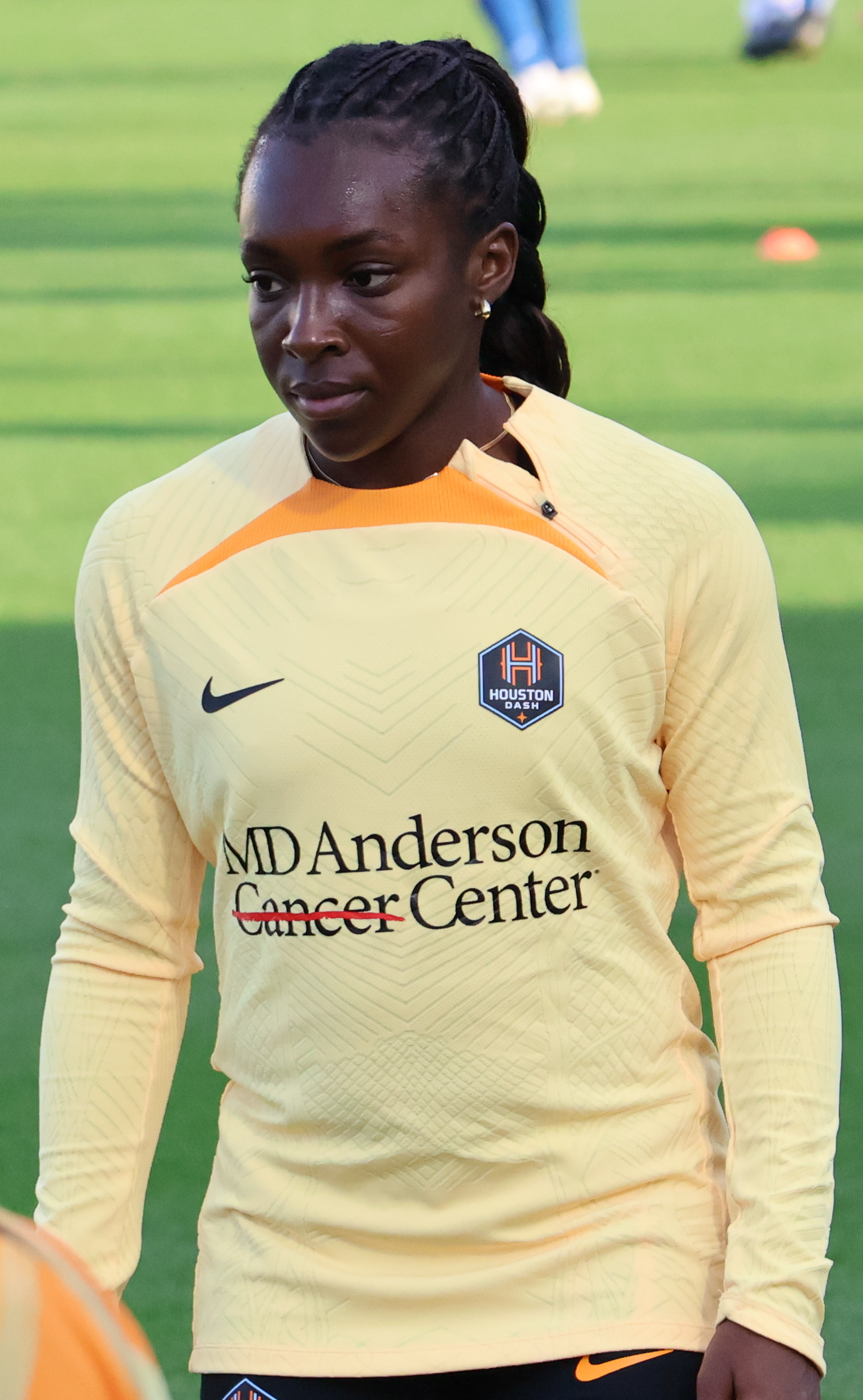
Michelle Alozie

- **Deborah Abiodun** – **Washington Spirit (2025–)**
- **Michelle Alozie** – Houston Dash (2021–2025), **Chicago Stars FC (2026–)**
- Halimatu Ayinde – Western New York Flash (2015–2016)
- Josephine Chukwunonye – Washington Spirit (2015)
- Favour Emmanuel – San Diego Wave FC (2025)
- Uchenna Kanu – Racing Louisville FC (2023–2025)
- **Gift Monday** – **Washington Spirit (2025–)**
- Osinachi Ohale – Houston Dash (2014)
- **Chioma Okafor** – **North Carolina Courage (2026–)**
- Ngozi Okobi – Washington Spirit (2015)
- Chiamaka Okwuchukwu – San Diego Wave FC (2025)
- Ifeoma Onumonu – Boston Breakers (2017), Portland Thorns FC (2018), Reign FC (2019), Gotham FC (2020–2023), Utah Royals (2024)
- Francisca Ordega – Washington Spirit (2015–2018)
- Asisat Oshoala – Bay FC (2024–2025)
- **Nicole Payne** – Portland Thorns FC (2024–2025), **Orlando Pride (2026–)**

=== South Africa ===
- Thembi Kgatlana – Houston Dash (2018), Racing Louisville FC (2023)
- Hildah Magaia – Kansas City Current (2024)
- Linda Motlhalo – Houston Dash (2018), Racing Louisville FC (2024)
- Janine van Wyk – Houston Dash (2017–2018)

=== Uganda ===
- **Fauzia Najjemba** – **Boston Legacy FC (2026–)**

=== Zambia ===
- **Barbra Banda** – **Orlando Pride (2024–)**
- Grace Chanda – Orlando Pride (2025)
- **Prisca Chilufya** – Orlando Pride (2025), **Angel City FC (2026–)**
- **Racheal Kundananji** – Bay FC (2024–2026), **Chicago Stars FC (2026–)**

== Asia (AFC) ==
=== Australia ===
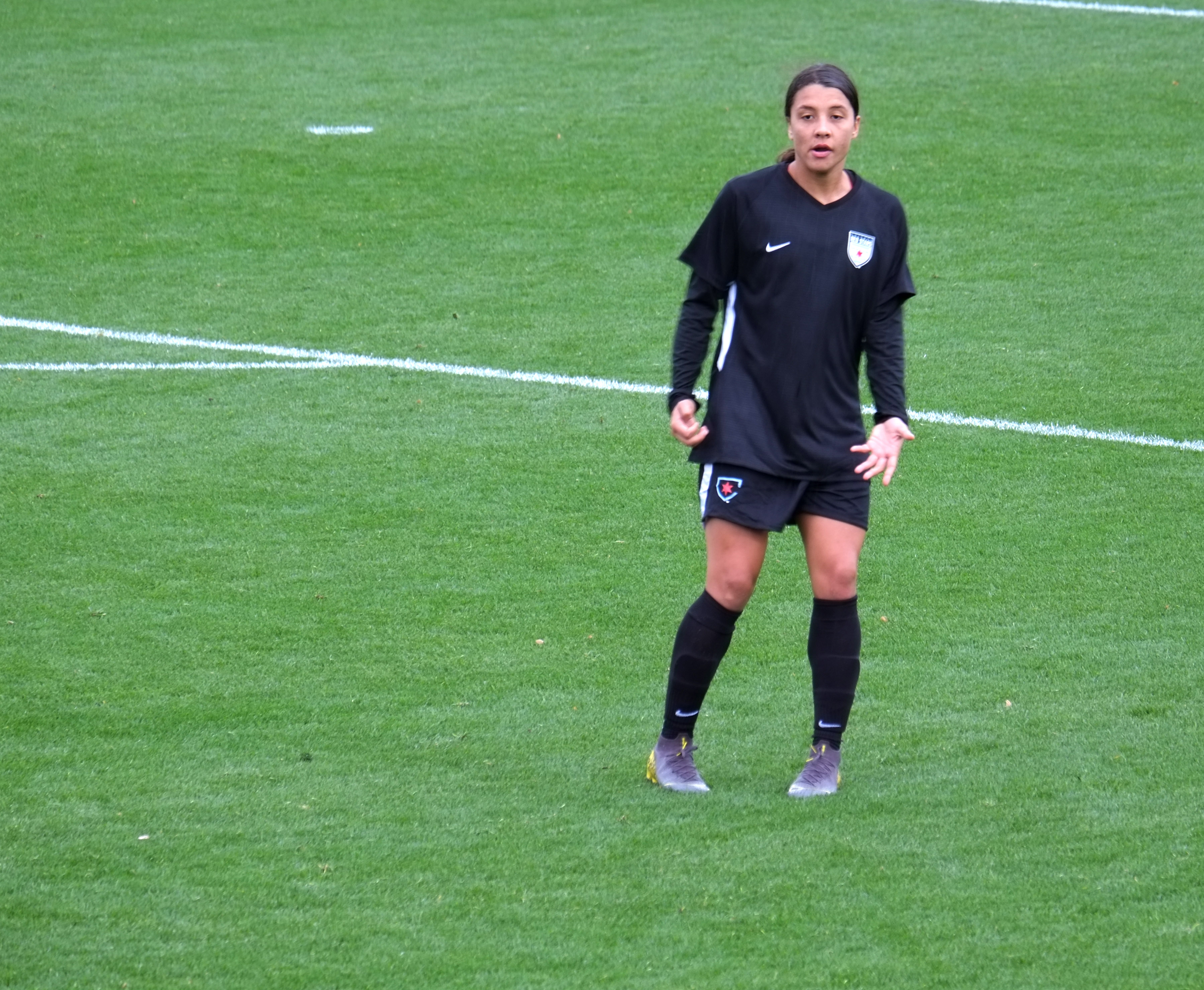
Sam Kerr

- Teigen Allen – Western New York Flash (2014)
- Laura Alleway – Orlando Pride (2016–2017)
- **Mackenzie Arnold** – **Portland Thorns FC (2024–)**
- Ellie Brush – Houston Dash (2015–2016)
- Ellie Carpenter – Portland Thorns FC (2018–2019)
- Steph Catley – Portland Thorns FC (2014–2015), Orlando Pride (2016–2017), Reign FC (2018–2019)
- Alex Chidiac – Racing Louisville FC (2022–2023)
- Larissa Crummer – Seattle Reign FC (2017)
- Chelsie Dawber – Chicago Red Stars (2022)
- Lisa De Vanna – Sky Blue FC (2013), Boston Breakers (2014), Washington Spirit (2014), Orlando Pride (2016)
- Caitlin Foord – Sky Blue FC (2013–2015), Portland Thorns FC (2018–2019)
- Katrina Gorry – FC Kansas City (2014), Utah Royals (2018)
- Amy Harrison – Washington Spirit (2019)
- Michelle Heyman – Western New York Flash (2015)
- Elise Kellond–Knight – Reign FC (2019), Washington Spirit (2019)
- Alanna Kennedy – Western New York Flash (2016), Orlando Pride (2017–2020), Angel City FC (2025)
- **Sam Kerr** – Western New York Flash (2013–2014), Sky Blue FC (2015–2017), Chicago Red Stars (2018–2019), **Gotham FC (2026–)**
- Chloe Logarzo (Berryhill) – Washington Spirit (2019), Kansas City Current (2021–2023)
- Charlotte McLean – North Carolina Courage (2024–2025)
- Clare Polkinghorne – Portland Thorns FC (2015), Houston Dash (2018–2019)
- Hayley Raso – Washington Spirit (2015), Portland Thorns FC (2016–2019)
- Kyah Simon – Boston Breakers (2013, 2015–2016), Houston Dash (2018–2019)
- Ashleigh Sykes – Portland Thorns FC (2017)
- Kaitlyn Torpey – San Diego Wave FC (2024–2025), Portland Thorns FC (2025)
- Emily van Egmond – Seattle Reign FC (2013), Chicago Red Stars (2014), Orlando Pride (2018–2021), San Diego Wave FC (2022–2024)
- Cortnee Vine – North Carolina Courage (2024–2026)
- Lydia Williams – Western New York Flash (2014), Houston Dash (2016–2017), Reign FC (2017–2019)

=== China ===
- Wang Shuang — Racing Louisville FC (2022–2023)

=== Japan ===
- **Jun Endō** – **Angel City FC (2022–)**
- Manaka Hayashi – Chicago Stars FC (2025–2026)
- Yuri Kawamura – North Carolina Courage (2017–2018)
- Nahomi Kawasumi – Seattle Reign FC (2014, 2016–2018), Gotham FC (2019–2023)
- Nanase Kiryu – Sky Blue FC (2014)
- **Shinomi Koyama** – **North Carolina Courage (2025–)**
- Manaka Matsukubo – North Carolina Courage (2023–2026)
- **Narumi Miura** – North Carolina Courage (2023–2024), Washington Spirit (2024–2025), **Utah Royals (2026–)**
- **Miyabi Moriya** – Angel City FC (2025), **Utah Royals (2026–)**
- Fūka Nagano – North Carolina Courage (2022)
- Yūki Nagasato – Chicago Red Stars (2017–2020), Racing Louisville FC (2021), Chicago Red Stars (2022–2023), Houston Dash (2024)
- **Uno Shiragaki** – **North Carolina Courage (2026–)**
- **Hannah Stambaugh** – Angel City FC (2024–2025), **Boston Legacy FC (2026–)**
- **Hina Sugita** – Portland Thorns FC (2022–2025), **Angel City FC (2025–)**
- Saori Takarada – Washington Spirit (2021)

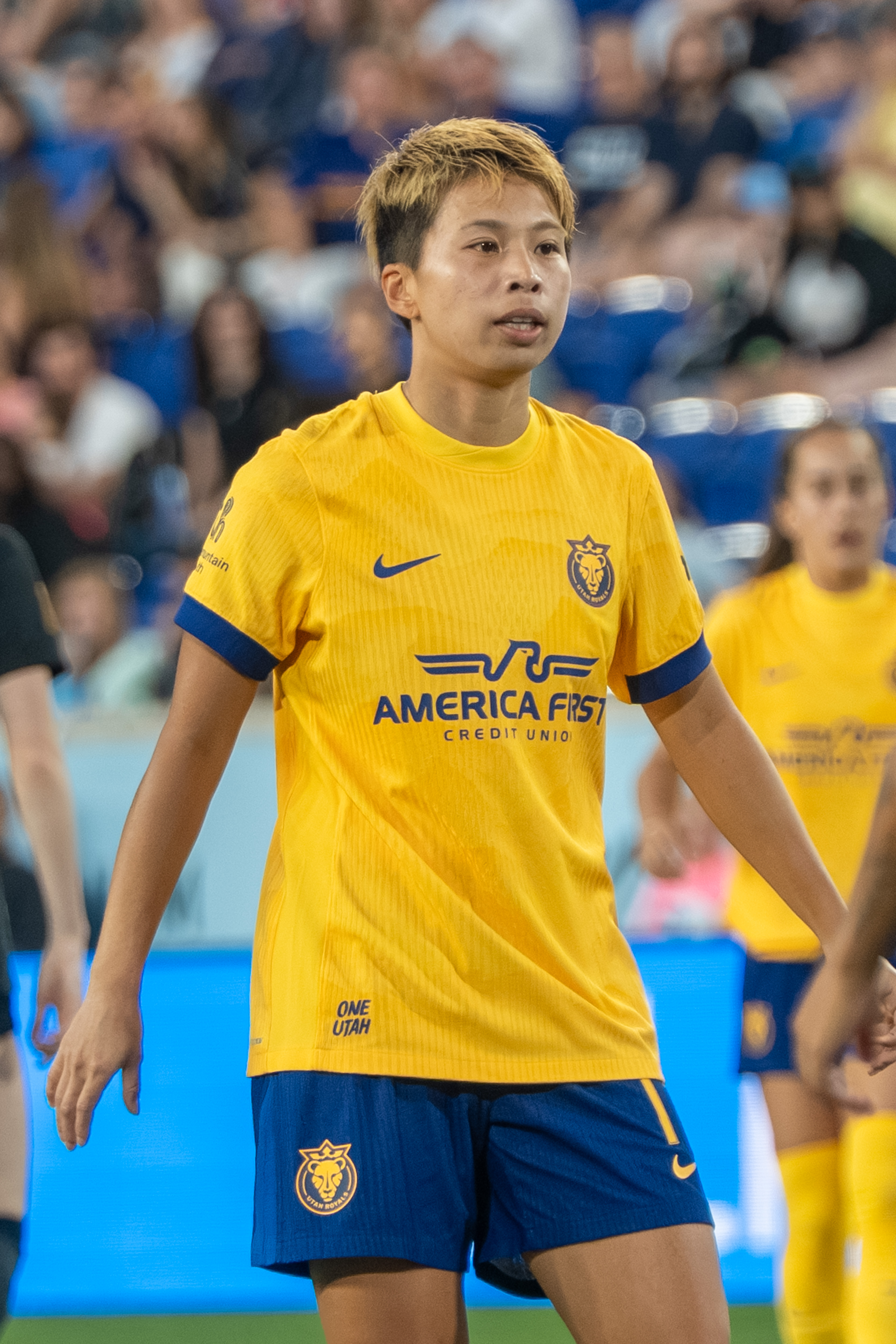
Mina Tanaka

- **Mina Tanaka** – **Utah Royals (2024–)**
- Rumi Utsugi – Reign FC (2016–2019)
- **Yuzuki Yamamoto** – **Denver Summit FC (2026–)**
- Kumi Yokoyama – Washington Spirit (2020–2021), Gotham FC (2022)

=== South Korea ===
- Jeon Ga-eul – Western New York Flash (2016)
- Ji So-yun – Seattle Reign FC (2024–2025)
- Lee So-dam – Gotham FC (2021)
- **Casey Phair** – **Angel City FC (2025–)**

== Europe (UEFA) ==
=== Austria ===
- Nina Burger – Houston Dash (2014)
- **Sarah Puntigam** – **Houston Dash (2023–)**

=== Belgium ===
- Janice Cayman – Western New York Flash (2016)

=== Bosnia and Herzegovina ===
- **DiDi Haračić** – Western New York Flash (2014), Washington Spirit (2017–2018), Sky Blue FC (2019–2021), Angel City FC (2022–2024), **San Diego Wave FC (2025–)**
- **Emina Ekić** – Racing Louisville FC (2021–2023), **Houston Dash (2026–)**

=== Denmark ===
- Stine Ballisager Pedersen – Kansas City Current (2023–2024)
- Mille Gejl – North Carolina Courage (2023)
- **Josefine Hasbo** – Gotham FC (2025–2026), **Boston Legacy FC (2026–)**
- Line Jensen – Washington Spirit (2016–2017)
- Camilla Kur Larsen – Western New York Flash (2015)
- Rikke Madsen – North Carolina Courage (2022–2023)
- Nadia Nadim – Sky Blue FC (2014–2015), Portland Thorns FC (2016–2017), Racing Louisville FC (2021–2023)
- Theresa Nielsen – Reign FC (2018–2019)
- **Isabella Bryld Obaze** – **Portland Thorns FC (2024–)**
- Cecilie Sandvej – Washington Spirit (2014)
- Janni Thomsen – Utah Royals (2025–2026)
- Katrine Veje – Seattle Reign FC (2015)

=== England ===
- **Princess Ademiluyi** – **Gotham FC (2025–)**
- Tinaya Alexander – Washington Spirit (2022)
- Rachael Axon – Houston Dash (2015)
- Ashley Baker – Sky Blue FC (2013)
- Karen Bardsley – OL Reign (2021)
- **Keira Barry** – **Bay FC (2026–)**
- **Gemma Bonner** – Racing Louisville FC (2021–2022), **Denver Summit FC (2026–)**

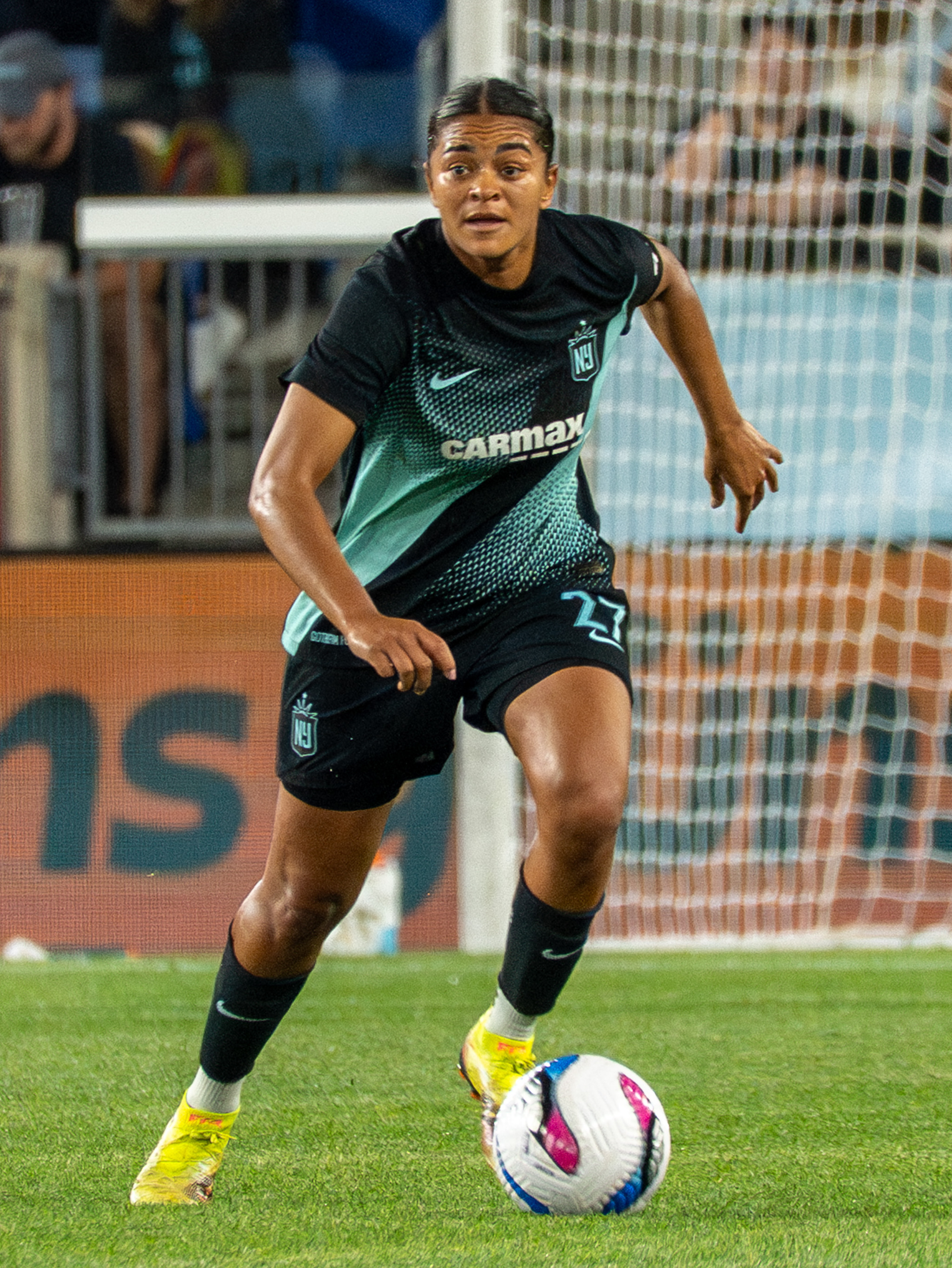
Jess Carter

- **Jess Carter** – **Gotham FC (2024–)**
- Rachel Daly – Houston Dash (2016–2022)
- **Anouk Denton** – **Bay FC (2026–)**
- Nicole Douglas – Washington Spirit (2023)
- Natasha Dowie – Boston Breakers (2016–2017)
- Millie Farrow – North Carolina Courage (2023)
- **Natasha Flint** – **Denver Summit FC (2026–)**
- Leah Galton – Sky Blue FC (2016–2017)
- **Laila Harbert** – Portland Thorns FC (2025), **San Diego Wave FC (2026–)**
- Anna Moorhouse – Orlando Pride (2022–2026)
- **Esme Morgan** – **Washington Spirit (2024–)**
- **Erica Parkinson** – **North Carolina Courage (2026–)**
- Ebony Salmon – Racing Louisville FC (2021–2022), Houston Dash (2022–2023)
- Lianne Sanderson – Boston Breakers (2013–2014), Portland Thorns FC (2015), Orlando Pride (2016), Western New York Flash (2016)
- Jodie Taylor – Washington Spirit (2014), Portland Thorns FC (2015), OL Reign (2018–2020), Orlando Pride (2021), San Diego Wave FC (2022)
- Carly Telford – San Diego Wave FC (2022)
- **Lauryn Thompson** – **North Carolina Courage (2026–)**
- Amy Turner – Orlando Pride (2021–2022)
- Chioma Ubogagu – Houston Dash (2016), Orlando Pride (2017–2019)
- Katie Zelem – Angel City FC (2024–2025)

=== Finland ===
- **Natalia Kuikka** – Portland Thorns FC (2021–2023), **Chicago Stars FC (2024–)**
- Elli Pikkujämsä – Racing Louisville FC (2023–2025)

=== France ===
- Sarah Bouhaddi – OL Reign (2021)
- Annaïg Butel – Washington Spirit (2023–2024)
- Delphine Cascarino – San Diego Wave FC (2024–2025)
- Daphné Corboz – Sky Blue FC (2017)
- **Kenza Dali** – **San Diego Wave FC (2025–)**
- Aminata Diallo – Utah Royals (2020)
- **Julie Dufour** – Angel City FC (2025), **Portland Thorns FC (2025–)**
- **Laurina Fazer** – **San Diego Wave FC (2025–)**
- Valérie Gauvin – Houston Dash (2022)
- Amandine Henry – Portland Thorns FC (2016–2017), Angel City FC (2023–2024), Utah Royals (2024)
- Inès Jaurena – Washington Spirit (2023)
- Claire Lavogez – Kansas City Current (2022–2024)
- Clarisse Le Bihan – Angel City FC (2022–2024)
- Eugénie Le Sommer – OL Reign (2021)
- **Perle Morroni** – **San Diego Wave FC (2024–)**
- **Pauline Peyraud-Magnin** – **Denver Summit FC (2026–)**
- Ouleymata Sarr – Washington Spirit (2023–2024)
- Kysha Sylla – Washington Spirit (2025)
- Gaëtane Thiney – Gotham FC (2021)

=== Germany ===
- Nadine Angerer – Portland Thorns FC (2014–2015)
- Eunice Beckmann – Boston Breakers (2016)
- **Ann-Katrin Berger** – **Gotham FC (2024–)**
- **Gia Corley** – **San Diego Wave FC (2025–)**
- **Melissa Kössler** – **Denver Summit FC (2026–)**
- Sara Doorsoun – Angel City FC (2025)
- Sonja Fuss – Chicago Red Stars (2013)
- Kerstin Garefrekes – Washington Spirit (2014)
- **Anna Gasper** – **Chicago Stars FC (2026–)**
- Inka Grings – Chicago Red Stars (2013)
- Kathrin Hendrich – Chicago Stars FC (2025–2026)
- Dzsenifer Marozsán – OL Reign (2021)
- **Marie Müller**– **Portland Thorns FC (2024–)**
- Conny Pohlers – Washington Spirit (2013)
- Maximiliane Rall – Chicago Red Stars (2024)
- **Felicitas Rauch** – **North Carolina Courage (2024–)**
- Marleen Schimmer – San Diego Wave FC (2022)
- Almuth Schult – Angel City FC (2022), Kansas City Current (2024)
- Sandra Starke – Chicago Red Stars (2023)

=== Iceland ===
- Dagný Brynjarsdóttir – Portland Thorns FC (2016–2017, 2019)
- Svava Rós Guðmundsdóttir – Gotham FC (2023)
- Andrea Rán Snæfeld Hauksdóttir – Houston Dash (2021)
- Gunnhildur Jónsdóttir – Utah Royals (2018–2020), Orlando Pride (2021–2022)
- **Sveindís Jane Jónsdóttir** – **Angel City FC (2025–)**

=== Israel ===
- Danielle Schulmann – Sky Blue FC (2016)
- **Talia Sommer** – **Gotham FC (2026–)**

=== Italy ===
- **Lisa Boattin – Houston Dash (2025–)**

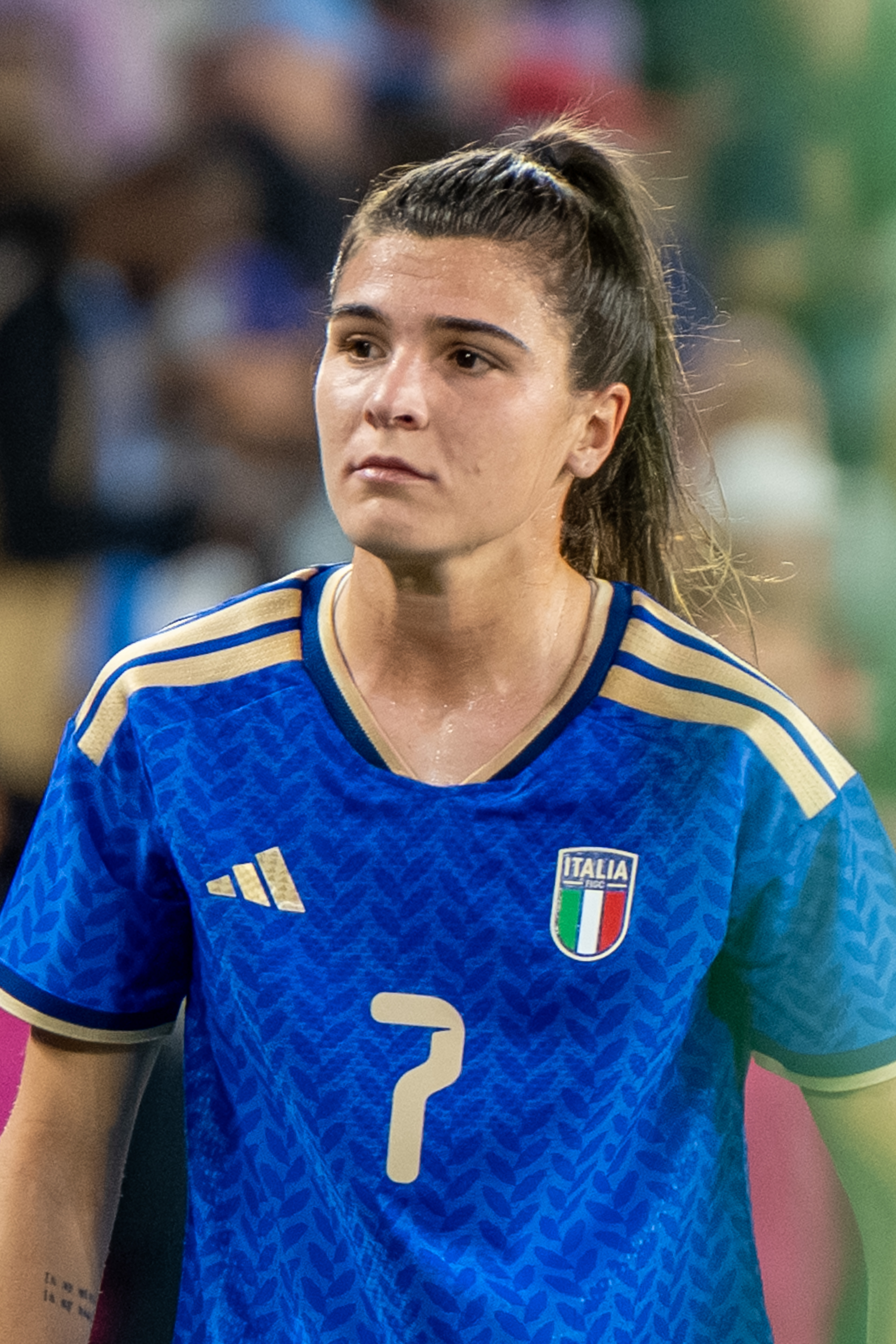
Sofia Cantore

- **Barbara Bonansea - San Diego Wave FC (2026–)**
- **Sofia Cantore – Washington Spirit (2025–)**
- **Lucia Di Guglielmo – Washington Spirit (2026–)**
- **Cristiana Girelli – Bay FC (2026–)**

=== Malta ===
- Haley Bugeja — Orlando Pride (2022–2023)

=== Netherlands ===
- Dana Foederer – Utah Royals (2024–2025)
- Manon Melis – Seattle Reign FC (2016)
- **Nina Nijstad** – **Portland Thorns FC (2026–)**
- Maruschka Waldus – Sky Blue FC (2015)

=== Northern Ireland ===
- Rebecca Holloway – Racing Louisville FC (2022–2023)

=== Norway ===
- Nora Holstad Berge – North Carolina Courage (2017)
- **Cassandra Bogere** – **Portland Thorns FC (2026–)**
- Emilie Haavi – Boston Breakers (2017)
- **Guro Reiten** – **Gotham FC (2026–)**
- **Vilde Bøe Risa** – **North Carolina Courage (2026–)**
- Elise Thorsnes – Utah Royals (2018)
- Lisa–Marie Woods – Boston Breakers (2013)

=== Poland ===
- Nikki Krzysik – FC Kansas City (2014)

=== Portugal ===
- Amanda DaCosta – Washington Spirit (2015), Chicago Red Stars (2016), Boston Breakers (2017)
- Ana Dias – Portland Thorns FC (2024)
- **Nádia Gomes** – **Chicago Stars FC (2024–)**
- Suzane Pires – Boston Breakers (2015)
- Jéssica Silva – Kansas City Current (2021), Gotham FC (2024–2025)

=== Republic of Ireland ===
- Diane Caldwell – North Carolina Courage (2021)
- Kyra Carusa – San Diego Wave FC (2023–2025), Kansas City Current (2026)
- Sinead Farrelly – FC Kansas City (2013), Portland Thorns FC (2014–2015), Gotham FC (2023–2024)
- Alli Murphy – Houston Dash (2018)

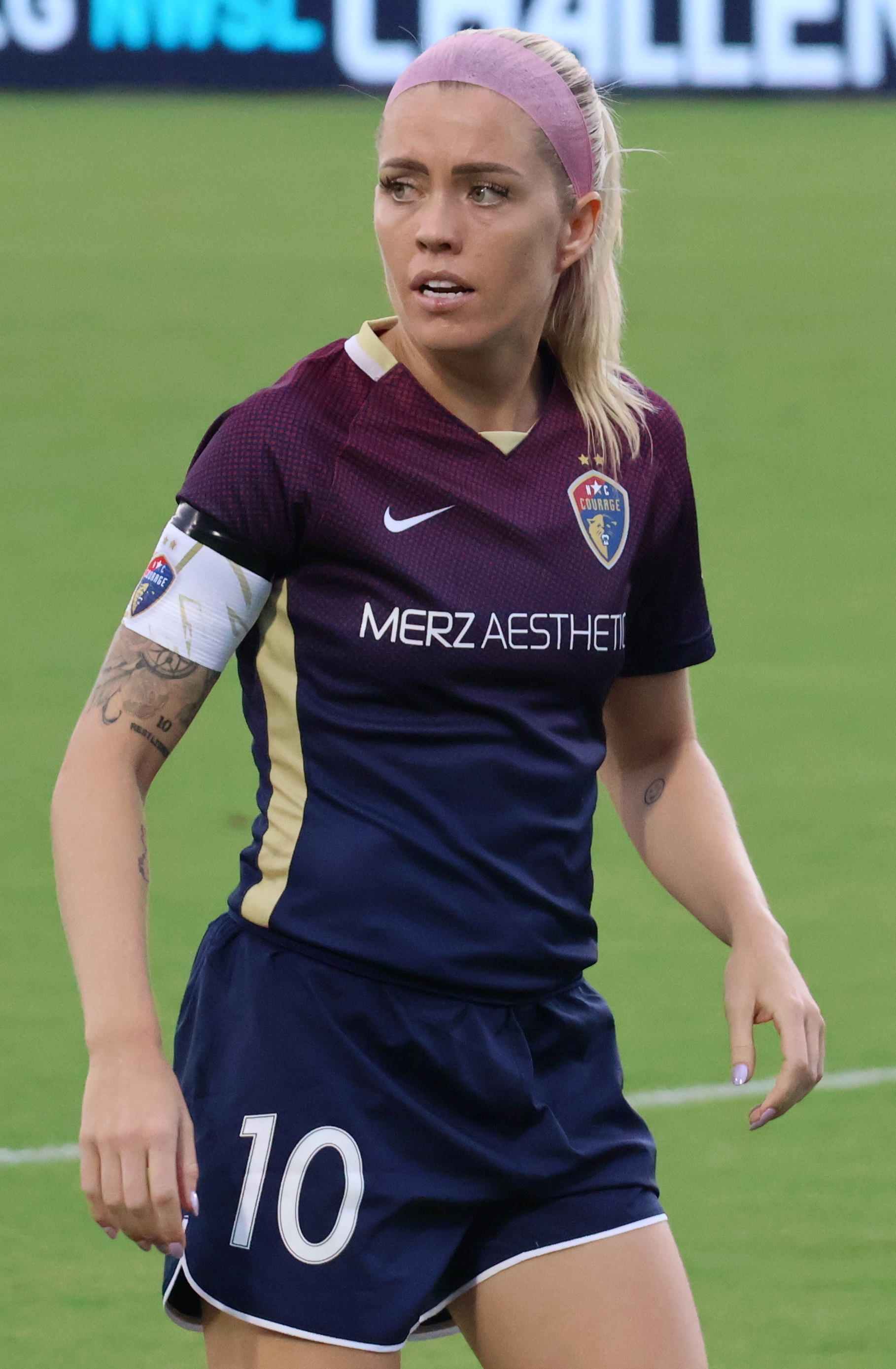
Denise O'Sullivan

- Denise O'Sullivan – Houston Dash (2016–2017), North Carolina Courage (2017–2025)
- Stephanie Roche – Houston Dash (2015)
- Marissa Sheva – Washington Spirit (2022–2023), Portland Thorns FC (2024)

=== Scotland ===
- Jen Beattie – Bay FC (2024)
- Rachel Corsie – Seattle Reign FC (2015–2017), Utah Royals (2018–2020), Kansas City Current (2021)
- **Claire Emslie** – Orlando Pride (2019–2020), **Angel City FC (2022–)**
- Kim Little – OL Reign (2014–2016, 2022)
- **Sandy MacIver – Washington Spirit (2025–)**
- Miri Taylor – Angel City FC (2022)

=== Serbia ===
- **Miljana Ivanoić – Houston Dash (2026–)**

=== Slovenia ===
- **Lara Prašnikar** – **Utah Royals (2025–)**

=== Spain ===
- Sonia Bermúdez – Western New York Flash (2014)
- Verónica Boquete – Portland Thorns FC (2014), Utah Royals (2019–2020)
- **Alba Caño** – **Boston Legacy FC (2026–)**
- Laura del Río – Washington Spirit (2015)
- **Nahikari García** – **Denver Summit FC (2026–)**
- Esther González – Gotham FC (2023–2026)
- **Oihane Hernández** – **Orlando Pride (2025–)**
- Celia Jiménez – OL Reign (2019–2021), Orlando Pride (2022–2024)
- Vicky Losada – Western New York Flash (2014)
- **Maitane López** – Gotham FC (2023–2024), **Chicago Stars FC (2024–)**
- Adriana Martín – Western New York Flash (2013–2014)
- **Leila Ouahabi** – Chicago Stars FC (2026), **Gotham FC (2026–)**
- **Sandra Paños** – **San Diego Wave FC (2026–)**
- **Nuria Rábano** – **Utah Royals (2025–)**
- **Ana Tejada** – **Utah Royals (2024–)**
- **Oihane Valdezate** – **Chicago Stars FC (2026–)**
- Claudia Zornoza – Utah Royals (2024–2025)

=== Sweden ===
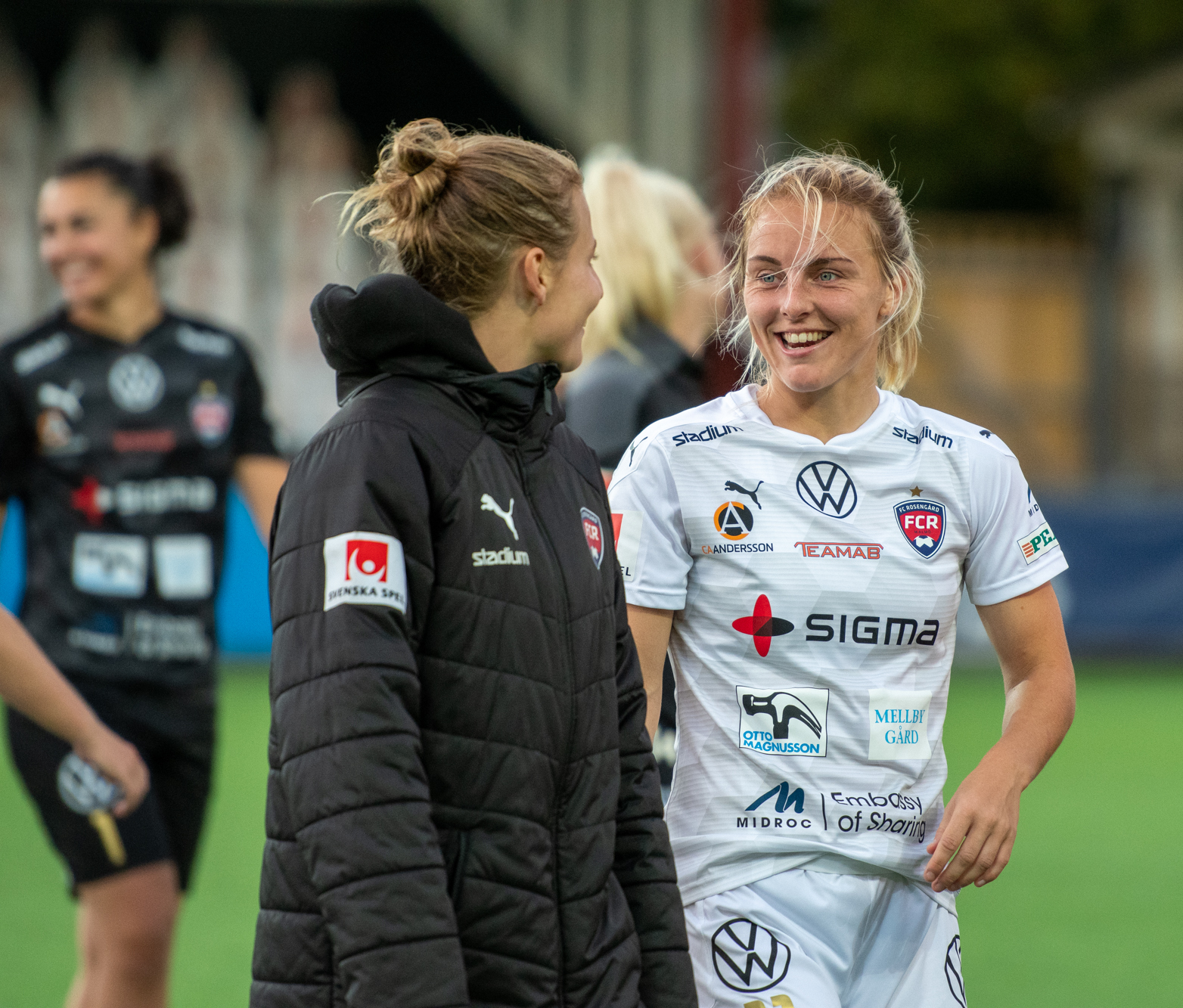
Mimmi Larsson

- **Evelina Duljan** – Orlando Pride (2024), **Houston Dash (2025–)**
- Hanna Glas – Kansas City Current (2023–2024), Seattle Reign FC (2024–2025)
- **Evelyn Ijeh** – **North Carolina Courage (2026–)**
- Sofia Jakobsson – San Diego Wave FC (2022–2024)
- Mimmi Larsson – Kansas City Current (2022–2023)
- Hanna Lundkvist – San Diego Wave FC (2024–2025)
- Agnes Nyberg – Utah Royals (2024)
- Freja Olofsson – Racing Louisville FC (2021–2022)
- Julia Roddar – Washington Spirit (2021–2022)
- Elin Rubensson – Houston Dash (2024)
- Louise Schillgard – Boston Breakers (2016)
- Julia Spetsmark – North Carolina Courage (2019)
- Hanna Terry – Portland Thorns FC (2014–2015)

=== Switzerland ===
- Ramona Bachmann – Houston Dash (2024–2025)
- Ana-Maria Crnogorčević – Portland Thorns FC (2018–2019), Seattle Reign FC (2024–2025)

=== Wales ===
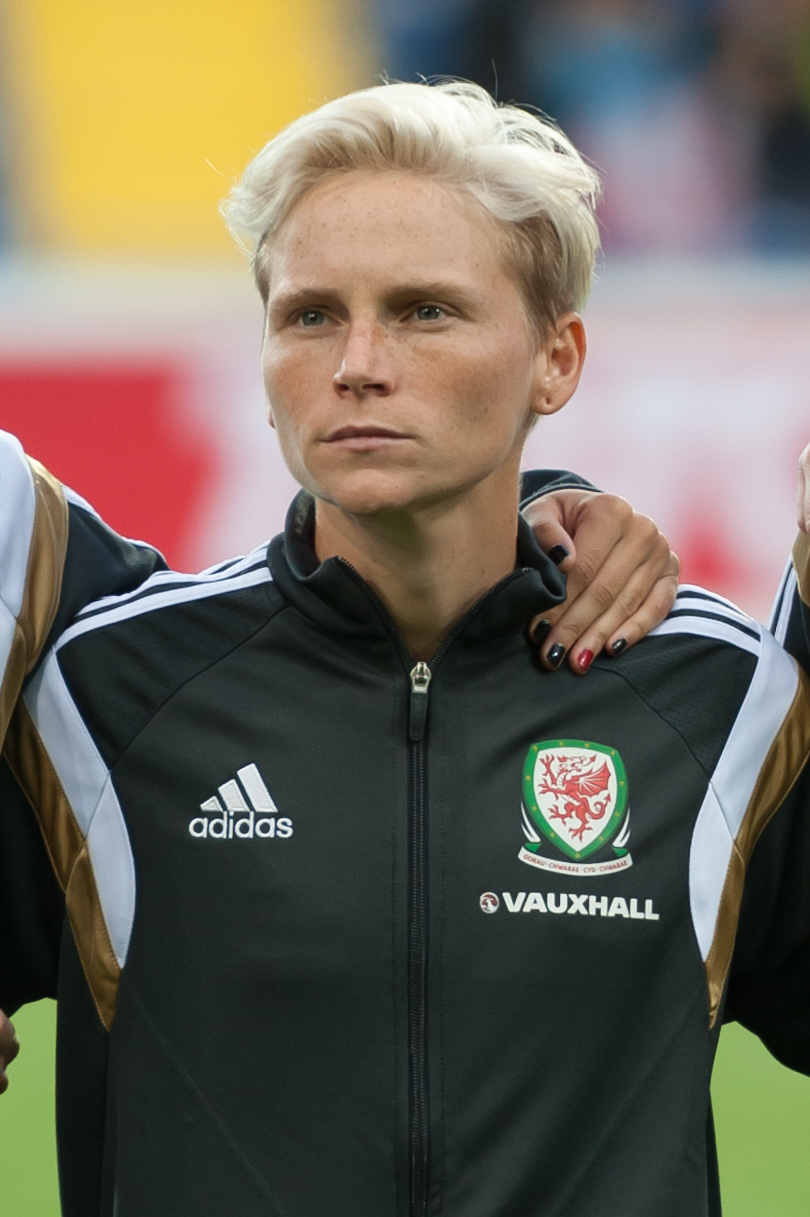
Jess Fishlock

- **Jess Fishlock** – **Seattle Reign FC (2013–)**
- **Angharad James** – North Carolina Courage (2021), Orlando Pride (2022), **Seattle Reign FC (2024–)**
- Lily Woodham – Seattle Reign FC (2024–2025)

== North and Central America, Caribbean (CONCACAF) ==
=== Bermuda ===
- Leilanni Nesbeth – Chicago Stars FC (2024–2026)

=== Canada ===
- Lindsay Agnew – Washington Spirit (2017), Houston Dash (2018–2019), North Carolina Courage (2020–2022)
- **Mimi Alidou** – **Portland Thorns FC (2025–2026)**
- **Amanda Allen** – Orlando Pride (2023–2025), **Boston Legacy FC (2026–)**
- Josée Bélanger – Orlando Pride (2016)
- Melanie Booth – Sky Blue FC (2013)
- Zoe Burns – Utah Royals (2024)
- **Gabrielle Carle** – **Washington Spirit (2023–)**
- **Allysha Chapman** – Houston Dash (2015–2016), Boston Breakers (2017), North Carolina Courage (2018), **Houston Dash (2018–)**
- Candace Chapman – Washington Spirit (2013)
- **Zara Chavoshi** – **Orlando Pride (2025–)**
- **Sydney Collins** – North Carolina Courage (2023–2025), **Bay FC (2025–)**
- **Brooklyn Courtnall** – North Carolina Courage (2025), Bay FC (2025–2026), **San Diego Wave FC (2026–)**
- Sabrina D'Angelo – Western New York Flash (2015–2016), North Carolina Courage (2017–2018)
- Nkem Ezurike – Boston Breakers (2014–2015)
- Jonelle Filigno – Sky Blue FC (2014–2015)
- **Jessie Fleming** – **Portland Thorns FC (2024–)**
- Robyn Gayle – Washington Spirit (2013–2014)
- Vanessa Gilles – Angel City FC (2022)
- **Julia Grosso** – **Chicago Stars FC (2024–)**
- **Jordyn Huitema** – Seattle Reign FC (2022–2026), **Chicago Stars FC (2026–)**
- Mya Jones – San Diego Wave FC (2024)

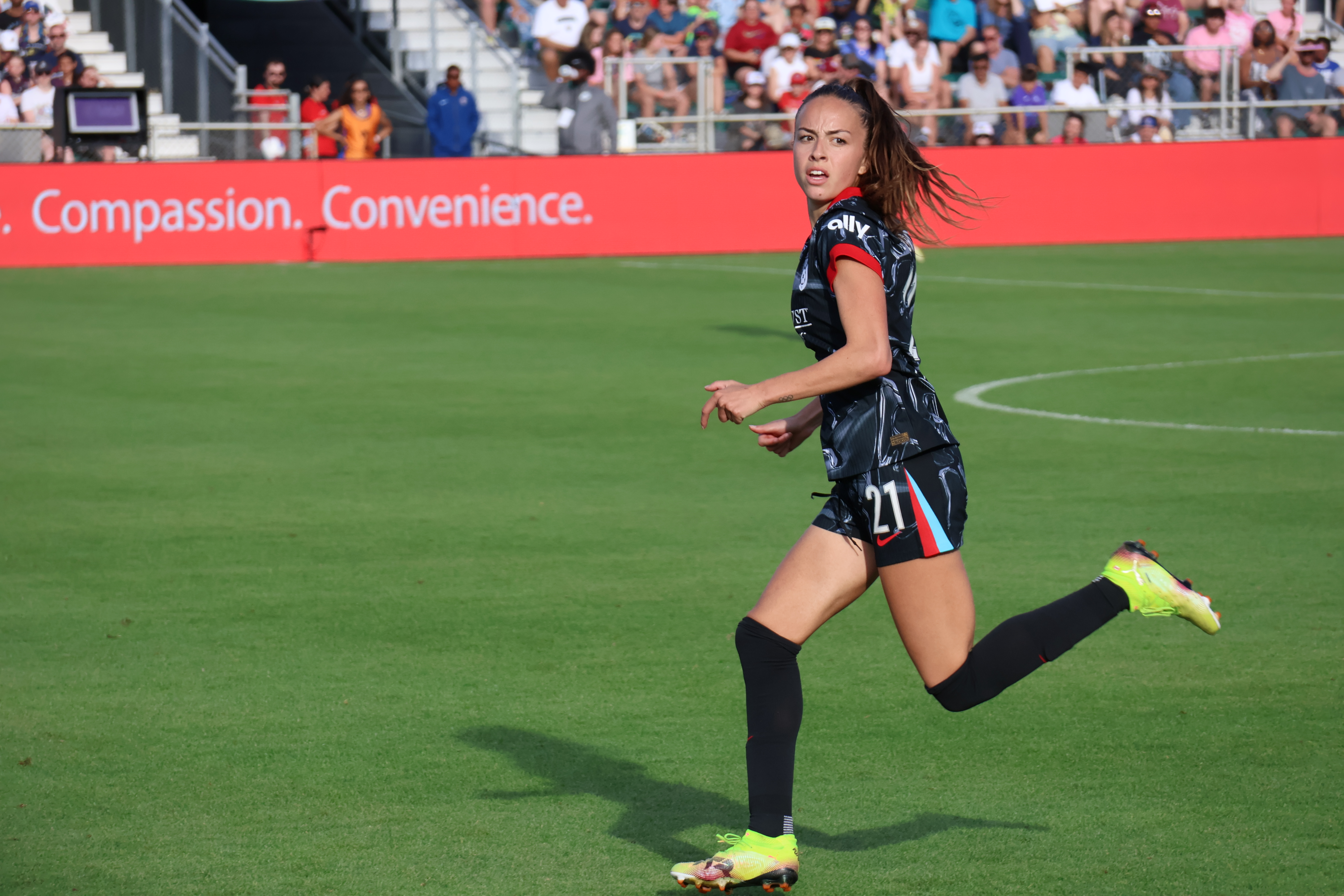
Julia Grosso

- Kaylyn Kyle – Seattle Reign FC (2013), Boston Breakers (2014), Houston Dash (2014), Portland Thorns FC (2015), Orlando Pride (2016)
- Stephanie Labbé –Washington Spirit (2016–2017), North Carolina Courage (2019–2020)
- Karina LeBlanc – Portland Thorns FC (2013), Chicago Red Stars (2014–2015)
- **Cloé Lacasse** – **Utah Royals (2024–)**
- **Clarissa Larisey** – **Houston Dash (2025–)**
- **Adriana Leon** – Boston Breakers (2013, 2017), Chicago Red Stars (2013–2015), Western New York Flash (2016), Sky Blue FC (2018), Seattle Reign FC (2018), Portland Thorns FC (2023), **San Diego Wave FC (2025–)**
- Jordyn Listro – Kansas City Current (2021), Orlando Pride (2022–2023)
- Diana Matheson – Washington Spirit (2013–2016), Seattle Reign FC (2017), Utah Royals (2018–2020)
- Bryanna McCarthy – Western New York Flash (2013)
- Erin McLeod – Chicago Red Stars (2013), Houston Dash (2014–2015), Orlando Pride (2020–2022)
- Carmelina Moscato – Chicago Red Stars (2013), Boston Breakers (2013), Seattle Reign FC (2014–2015)
- Victoria Pickett – Kansas City Current (2021–2023), North Carolina Courage (2023–2024)
- **Nichelle Prince** – Houston Dash (2017–2024), Kansas City Current (2024–2025), **Boston Legacy FC (2026–)**
- Lysianne Proulx – Bay FC (2024)
- Quinn – Washington Spirit (2018), OL Reign (2019–2024)
- Rachel Quon – Chicago Red Stars (2013–2015)
- **Emma Regan** – **Denver Summit FC (2026–)**
- **Megan Reid** – Angel City FC (2022–2025), **Denver Summit FC (2026–)**
- Sarah Robbins – Portland Thorns FC (2015)
- Jodi-Ann Robinson – Western New York Flash (2013)
- Maegan Rosa – FC Kansas City (2017), Utah Royals (2018), Reign FC (2019), Houston Dash (2020–2022)
- **Sophie Schmidt** – Sky Blue FC (2013–2014), **Houston Dash (2019–)**
- Desiree Scott – FC Kansas City (2013, 2016–2017), Utah Royals (2018–2020), Kansas City Current (2021–2024)
- Lauren Sesselmann – FC Kansas City (2013), Houston Dash (2014–2015)
- **Kailen Sheridan** – Sky Blue FC (2017–2021), San Diego Wave FC (2022–2025), **North Carolina Courage (2026–)**
- Christine Sinclair – Portland Thorns FC (2013–2024)
- **Janine Sonis** – Houston Dash (2016–2017), Sky Blue FC (2018), Portland Thorns FC (2022–2024), Racing Louisville FC (2024–2026), **Denver Summit FC (2026–)**
- Chelsea Stewart – Boston Breakers (2014), Western New York Flash (2015)
- **Bianca St-Georges** – Chicago Red Stars (2019–2024), North Carolina Courage (2024), Utah Royals (2025), **Boston Legacy FC (2026–)**
- Melissa Tancredi – Chicago Red Stars (2014–2015)
- **Élisabeth Tsé** – **Washington Spirit (2026–)**
- Evelyne Viens – Sky Blue FC (2020–2023)
- **Holly Ward** – **Seattle Reign FC (2026–)**
- **Amanda West** – **Houston Dash (2024–)**
- **Carly Wickenheiser** – **North Carolina Courage (2026–)**
- Rhian Wilkinson – Boston Breakers (2013), Portland Thorns FC (2015)
- Shelina Zadorsky – Washington Spirit (2016–2017), Orlando Pride (2018–2020)
- Emily Zurrer – Seattle Reign FC (2013)

=== Costa Rica ===
- Shirley Cruz – OL Reign (2020–2021)
- **Rocky Rodríguez** – Sky Blue FC (2016–2019), Portland Thorns FC (2020–2023), Angel City FC (2024), **Kansas City Current (2024–)**

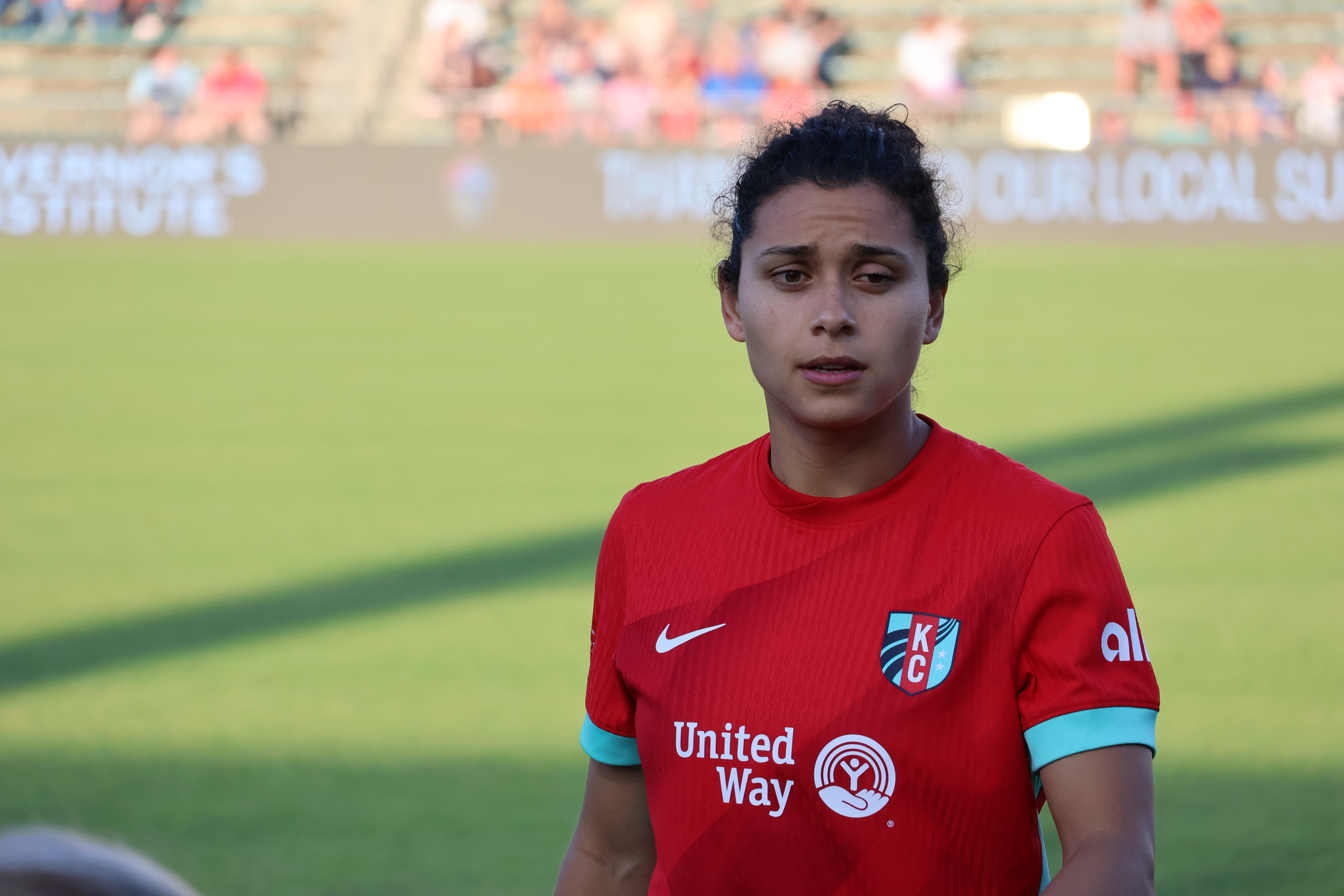
Rocky Rodriguez

=== Dominican Republic ===
- Vanessa Kara – Racing Louisville FC (2021)
- Brianne Reed – FC Kansas City (2016)

=== El Salvador ===
- Samantha Fisher – Chicago Red Stars (2022–2023)

=== Guatemala ===
- Aisha Solórzano – Utah Royals (2025)

=== Haiti ===
- Amandine Pierre-Louis – Sky Blue FC (2018–2019)
- **Nérilia Mondésir** – **Seattle Reign FC (2024–)**
- **Dayana Pierre-Louis** – **Utah Royals (2026–)**

=== Jamaica ===
- Chinyelu Asher – Washington Spirit (2021)
- Deneisha Blackwood – Houston Dash (2021)
- Tiffany Cameron – Seattle Reign FC (2013), FC Kansas City (2013)
- Cheyna Matthews – Washington Spirit (2016–2017, 2019), Racing Louisville FC (2021), Chicago Red Stars (2023)
- Kayla McCoy – Houston Dash (2019–2020)
- Satara Murray – Houston Dash (2019), Racing Louisville FC (2022)
- Konya Plummer – Orlando Pride (2020–2021)
- **Kameron Simmonds** – **Utah Royals (2026–)**
- Havana Solaun – Seattle Reign FC (2016), Washington Spirit (2017–2018), North Carolina Courage (2020–2022), Houston Dash (2023–2024)
- Allyson Swaby – Angel City FC (2022–2023)

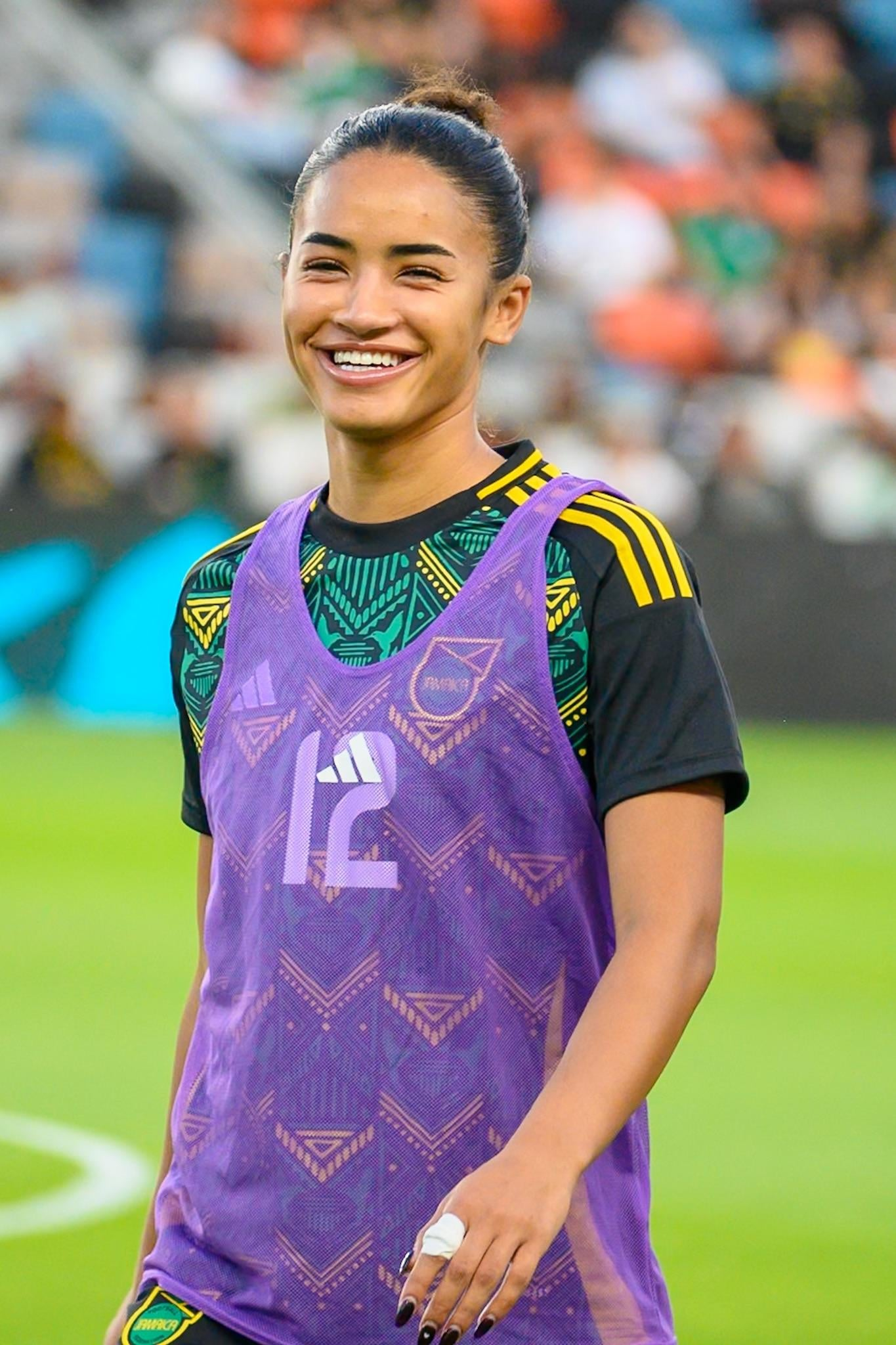
Kiki Van Zanten

- **Kiki Van Zanten** – **Houston Dash (2024–)**
- **Mimi Van Zanten** – **San Diego Wave FC (2026–)**
- **Solai Washington** – **Orlando Pride (2026–)**

=== Mexico ===
- Jackie Acevedo – Portland Thorns FC (2014)
- Emily Alvarado – Houston Dash (2023–2024), Portland Thorns FC (2024)
- Christina Burkenroad – Orlando Pride (2016–2017)
- Rebeca Bernal – Washington Spirit (2025–2026)
- **Lourdes Bosch** – **Denver Summit FC (2026–)**
- Ariana Calderón – Houston Dash (2019)
- Scarlett Camberos – Angel City FC (2023), Bay FC (2024)
- Renae Cuéllar – FC Kansas City (2013), Seattle Reign FC (2013), Washington Spirit (2014)
- Maribel Domínguez – Chicago Red Stars (2013)
- Sabrina Flores – Gotham FC (2019–2023)
- **Aaliyah Farmer** – **Chicago Stars FC (2026–)**
- Dinora Garza – Chicago Red Stars (2013)
- Bianca Henninger – FC Kansas City (2013), Houston Dash (2014–2019)
- **Nicolette Hernández** – **Boston Legacy FC (2026–)**
- Katie Johnson – Seattle Reign FC (2017), Sky Blue FC (2018), Chicago Red Stars (2019–2021), San Diego Wave FC (2022), Angel City FC (2023–2024)
- Jimena López – OL Reign (2021–2022)
- Teresa Noyola – Seattle Reign FC (2013), FC Kansas City (2013), Houston Dash (2014)
- Mónica Ocampo – Sky Blue FC (2013–2015)
- Diana Ordóñez – North Carolina Courage (2022), Houston Dash (2023–2025)
- **Lizbeth Ovalle** – **Orlando Pride (2025–)**
- **Kiana Palacios** – **Utah Royals (2026–)**
- Verónica Pérez – Western New York Flash (2013), Washington Spirit (2014)
- Nayeli Rangel – Sky Blue FC (2013)

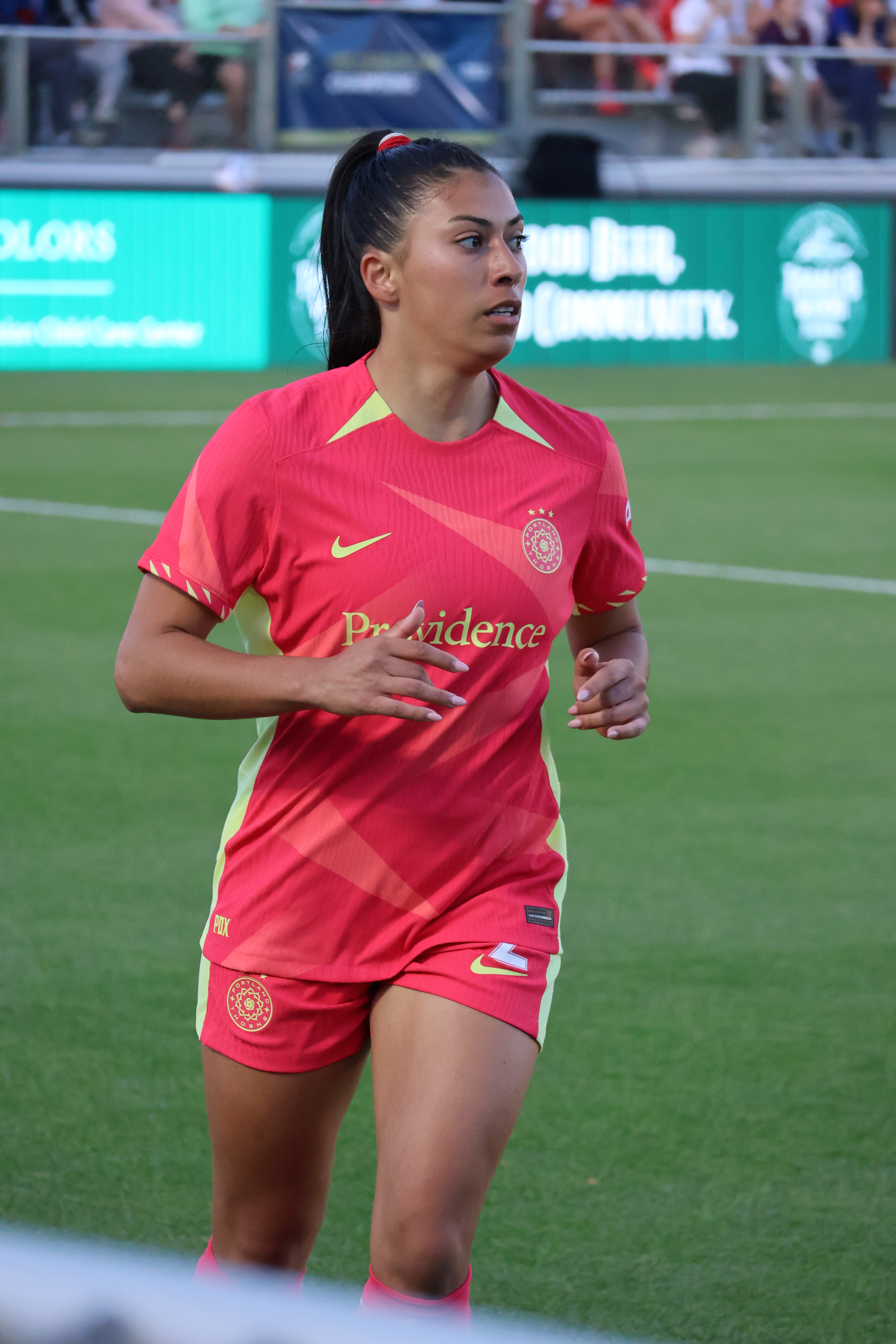
Reyna Reyes

- **Reyna Reyes** – **Portland Thorns FC (2023–)**
- Karina Rodríguez — Washington Spirit (2021–2022)
- Ari Romero – Houston Dash (2014, 2019)
- Jennifer Ruiz – Seattle Reign FC (2013)
- María Sánchez – Chicago Red Stars (2019), Houston Dash (2021–2024), San Diego Wave FC (2024–2025)
- Cecilia Santiago – Boston Breakers (2013)
- Bianca Sierra – Washington Spirit (2014), Boston Breakers (2014)
- Pamela Tajonar – Western New York Flash (2013)
- Guadalupe Worbis – Washington Spirit (2013)

=== Puerto Rico ===
- Jill Aguilera – Chicago Red Stars (2022–2023)
- Caitlin Cosme – Orlando Pride (2023)
- Nickolette Driesse – Orlando Pride (2017), Sky Blue FC (2018)
- Cristina Roque – Utah Royals (2024)
- **Ivy Younce** – **North Carolina Courage (2026–)**

=== Trinidad and Tobago ===
- Kennya Cordner – Seattle Reign FC (2013)

== Oceania (OFC) ==
=== New Zealand ===
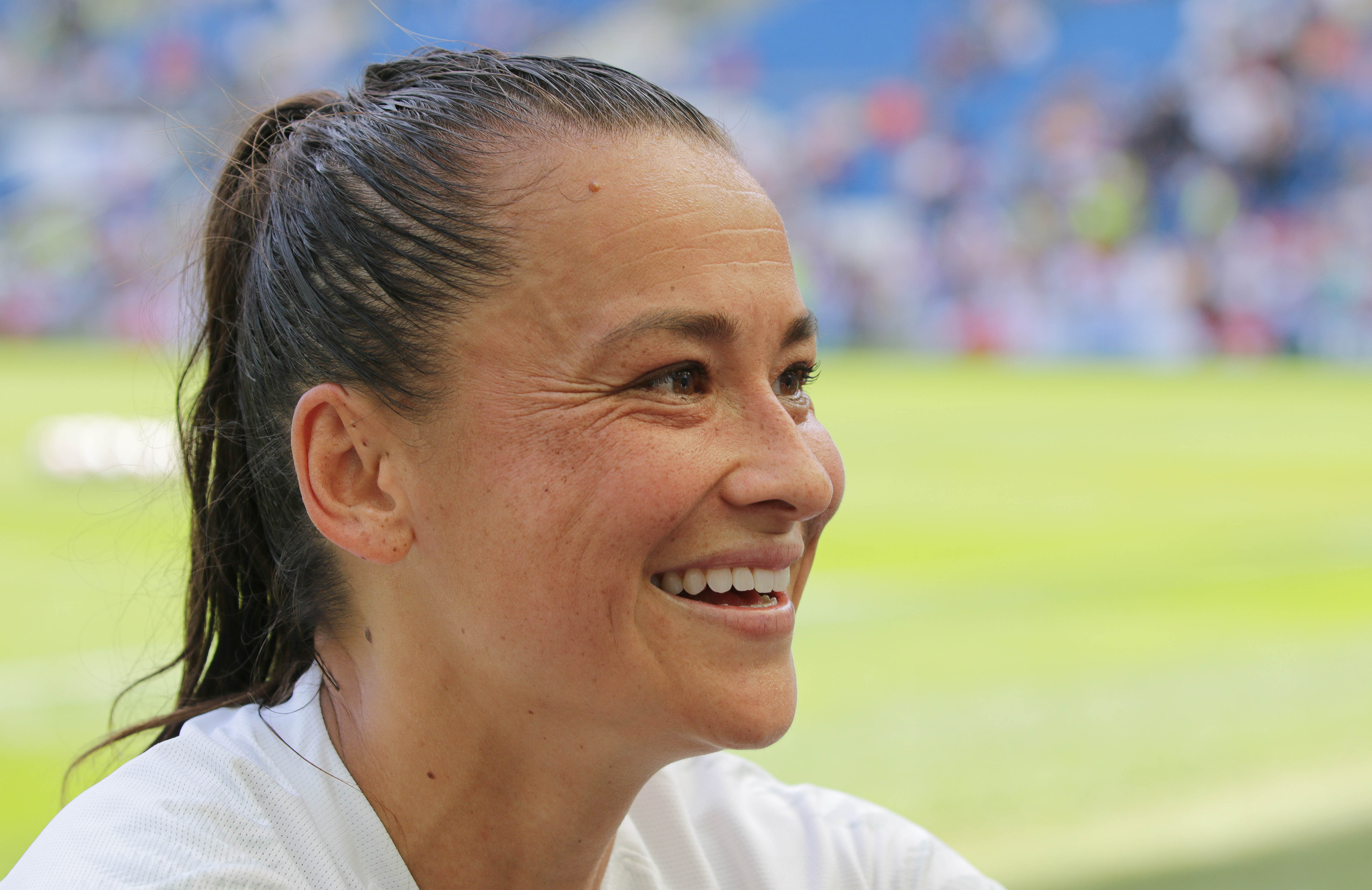
Ali Riley

- Katie Bowen – FC Kansas City (2016–2017), Utah Royals (2018–2020), Kansas City Current (2021), North Carolina Courage (2022)
- Milly Clegg – Racing Louisville FC (2024)
- Abby Erceg – Chicago Red Stars (2014–2015), Western New York Flash (2016), North Carolina Courage (2017–2022), Racing Louisville FC (2023–2024)
- Macey Fraser – Utah Royals (2024–2025)
- Emma Kete – Western New York Flash (2014)
- Ali Riley – Orlando Pride (2020–2021), Angel City FC (2022–2025)
- Rebekah Stott – Seattle Reign FC (2017), Sky Blue FC (2018)
- Rosie White – Boston Breakers (2017), Chicago Red Stars (2018), OL Reign (2019–2021)

=== Samoa ===
- Mariah Bullock – Boston Breakers (2013), Seattle Reign FC (2014–2015)

== South America (CONMEBOL) ==
=== Argentina ===
- Estefanía Banini – Washington Spirit (2015–2018)
- **Aldana Cometti** – **Bay FC (2026–)**
- Paulina Gramaglia – Houston Dash (2022)
- **Agostina Holzheier** – **Bay FC (2026–)**
- Mariana Larroquette – Kansas City Current (2021), Orlando Pride (2023–2024)

=== Brazil ===
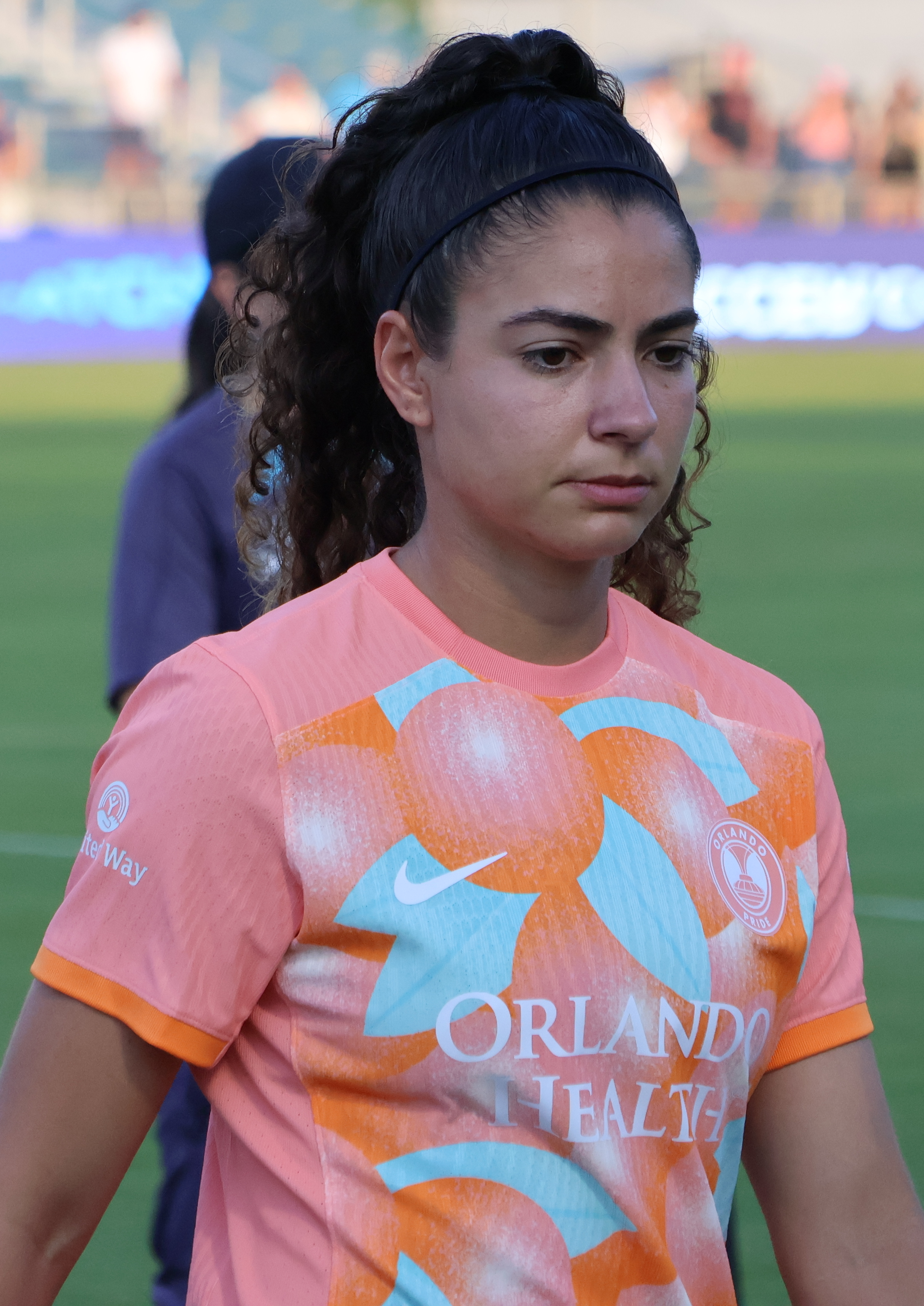
Angelina

- Adriana – Orlando Pride (2023–2024)
- Aline Gomes Amaro – North Carolina Courage (2024–2025)
- Andressa Alves – Houston Dash (2023–2024)
- Andressinha – Houston Dash (2015–2017), Portland Thorns FC (2018–2019)
- **Angelina** – OL Reign (2021–2023), **Orlando Pride (2024–)**
- **Laís Araújo** – **Boston Legacy FC (2026–)**
- Bruna Benites – Houston Dash (2017)
- **Bia Gomez Lopez** – **North Caroline Courage (2026–)**
- Bia Vaz – Boston Breakers (2015)
- Bia Zaneratto – Kansas City Current (2024–2025)
- Julia Bianchi – Chicago Red Stars (2023–2024)
- **Ary Borges** – Racing Louisville FC (2023–2026), **Angel City FC (2026–)**
- **Bruninha** – **Gotham FC (2022–)**
- Camila – Houston Dash (2015), Orlando Pride (2017–2019)
- Daiane Limeira – Portland Thorns FC (2025)
- **Debinha** – North Carolina Courage (2017–2022), **Kansas City Current (2023–)**
- **Dudinha** – **San Diego Wave FC (2025–)**
- Stefany Ferrer Van Ginkel – Angel City FC (2022)
- Geyse – Gotham FC (2025)
- **Amanda Gutierres** – **Boston Legacy FC (2026–)**

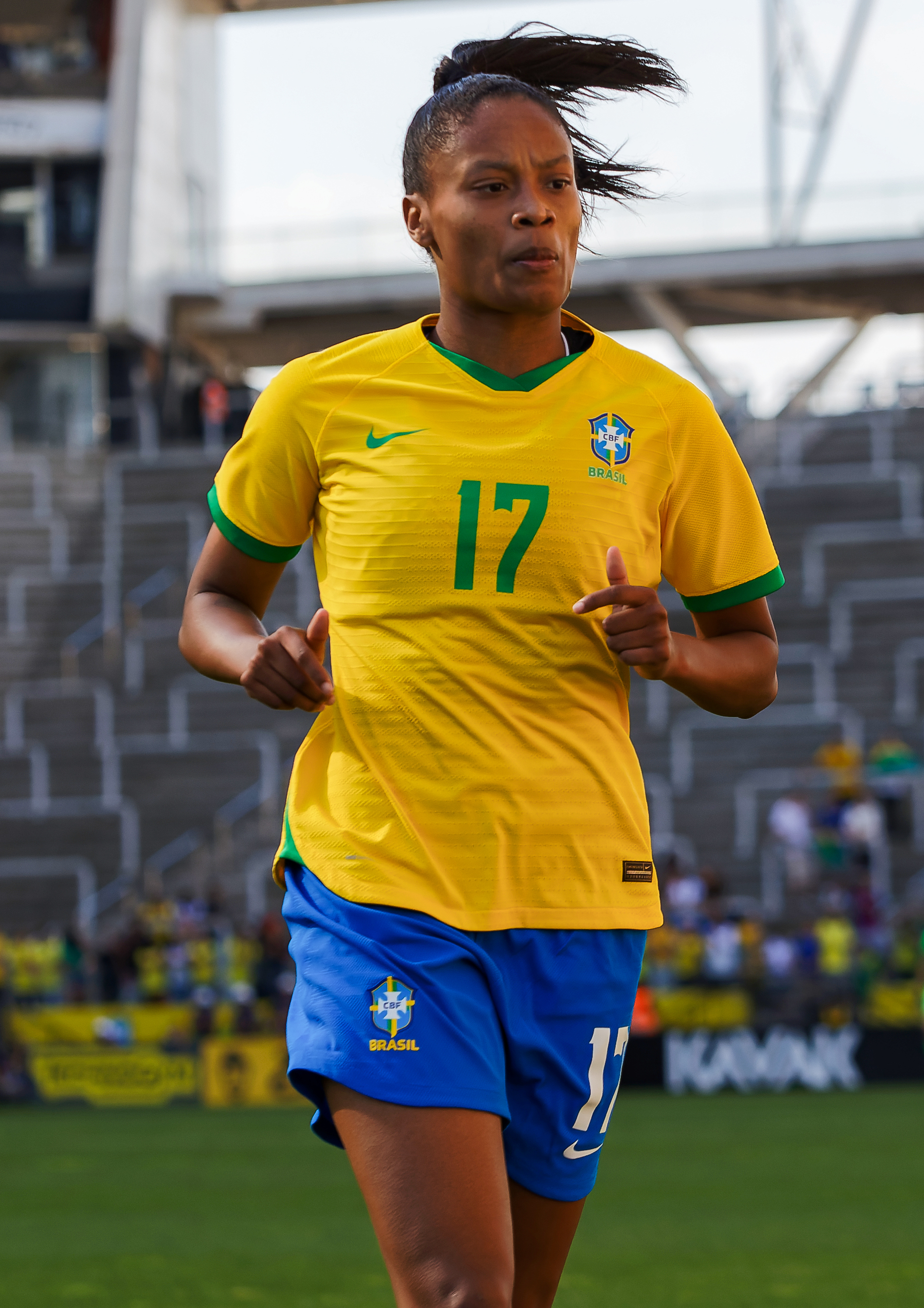
Ary Borges

- Kerolin – North Carolina Courage (2022–2024)
- **Kaká** — **Boston Legacy FC (2026–)**
- Ketlen – Boston Breakers (2015)
- Lauren – Kansas City Current (2023–2024)
- Leah Fortune – Orlando Pride (2016)
- **Lorena** – **Kansas City Current (2025–)**
- **Luana** – **Orlando Pride (2024–)**
- Luany — OL Reign (2023–2024)
- **Ludmila** – Chicago Stars FC (2024–2025), **San Diego Wave FC (2026–)**
- Gabi – Sky Blue FC (2019)
- **Marta** – **Orlando Pride (2017–)**
- Mônica – Orlando Pride (2016–2018)
- **Maiara Niehues – Angel City FC (2025–)**
- Gabi Nunes – Orlando Pride (2026)
- Poliana – Houston Dash (2016–2017), Orlando Pride (2018)
- **Gabi Portilho** – Gotham FC (2025), **San Diego Wave FC (2026–)**
- **Rafaelle** – Houston Dash (2014), **Orlando Pride (2023–)**
- Rafinha – Boston Breakers (2015)
- Thais Reiss – Orlando Pride (2022–2023)
- Rosana – North Carolina Courage (2017)
- **Tamara Bolt** – **Washington Spirit (2026–)**
- Thaisa – Sky Blue FC (2018)

=== Colombia ===
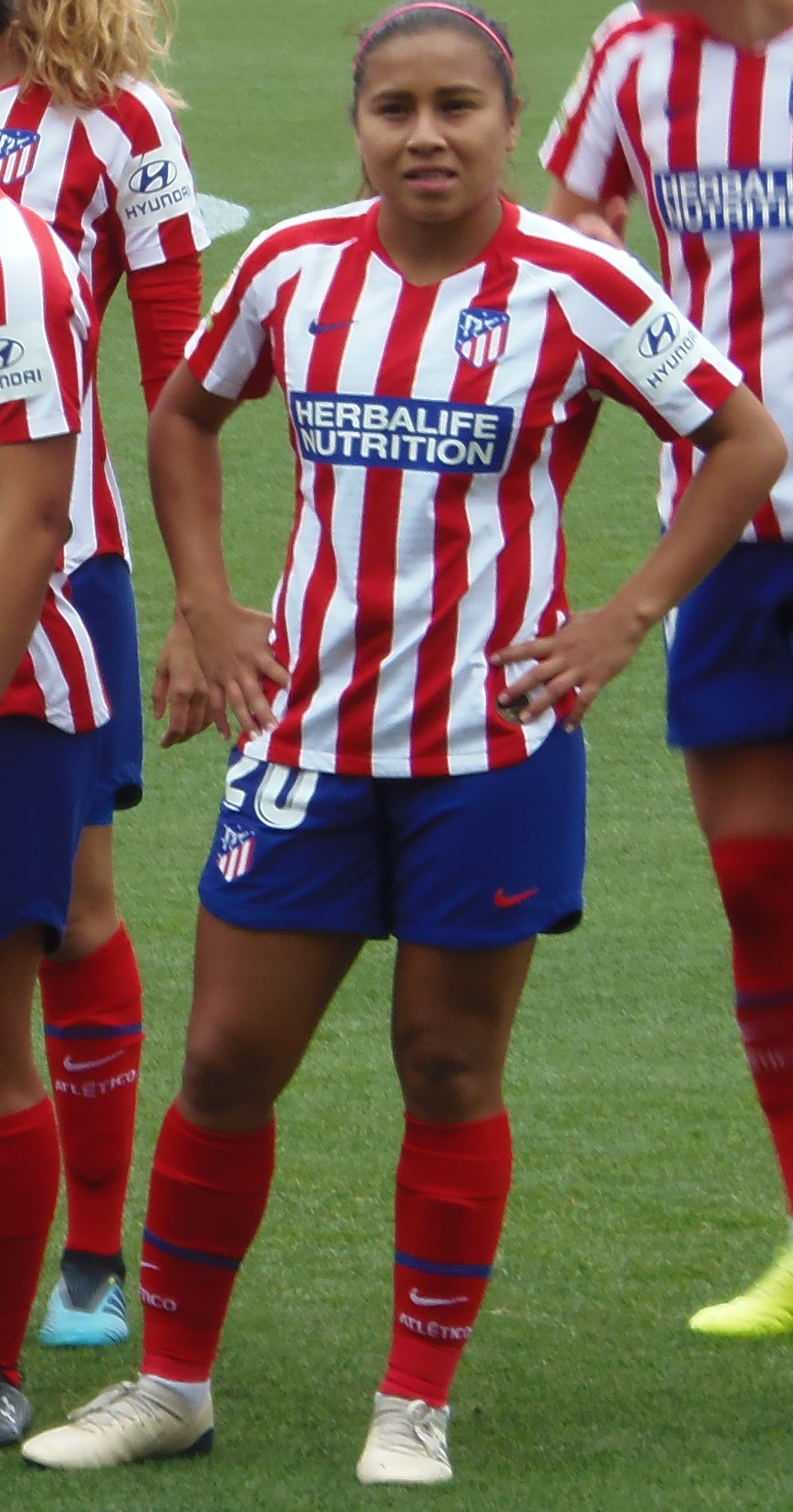
Leicy Santos

- **Luisa Agudelo** – **San Diego Wave FC (2026–)**
- Lady Andrade – Western New York Flash (2015–2016)
- Daniela Arias – San Diego Wave FC (2025)
- Elexa Bahr – Racing Louisville FC (2024)
- Ángela Barón – Racing Louisville FC (2024–2025)
- **Jorelyn Carabalí** – **Boston Legacy FC (2026–)**
- **Ivonne Chacón** – **Chicago Stars FC (2025–)**
- Ana María Guzmán – Utah Royals (2025)
- **Valerin Loboa** – **Portland Thorns FC (2025–)**
- **Leicy Santos – Washington Spirit (2024–)**

=== Paraguay ===
- **Claudia Martínez** – **Washington Spirit (2026–)**

=== Venezuela ===
- Deyna Castellanos – Bay FC (2024–2025), Portland Thorns FC (2025–2026)
- **Bárbara Olivieri** – Houston Dash (2023–2025), **Boston Legacy FC (2026–)**
- Mariana Speckmaier – Washington Spirit (2021, 2023)

== See also ==
- NWSL federation players

== Notes ==
Bold indicates current player and their team.

1. Born in Afghanistan
2. Born in Brazil
3. Born in Canada
4. Born in England
5. Born in France
6. Born in Hong Kong
7. Born in Hungary
8. Born in Jamaica
9. Born in Trinidad and Tobago
10. Born in the United Arab Emirates
11. Born in the United States
12. Capped for the Canada women's national soccer team
13. Capped for the Canada women's national under-20 soccer team
14. Capped for the France girls' national under-16 soccer team
15. Capped for the France women's national under-17 soccer team
16. Capped for the France women's national under-19 soccer team
17. Capped for the Honduras women's national under-20 soccer team
18. Capped for the United States women's national under-17 soccer team
19. Capped for the United States women's national under-19 soccer team
20. Capped for the United States women's national under-20 soccer team
21. Capped for the United States women's national under-23 soccer team
