= Robert L. Cohen =

American businessman

Robert Cohen
- Born: c. 1962 (age 63–64)
- Education: University of Texas at Austin
- Occupations: Chairman and CEO of IMA Financial Group
- Spouse: Molly Jenkins (m. 1990)
- Children: 4

Robert L. Cohen (born c. 1962) is an American businessman who is the chairman and chief executive officer (CEO) of IMA Financial Group. He is the primary owner of Denver Summit FC of the National Women's Soccer League (NWSL).

== Early life and education ==
Cohen was raised in a Jewish family in Wichita, Kansas. His father, William C. Cohen Jr., created the company Insurance Management Associates by merging his own father's William C. Cohen Insurance with two other Wichita insurers in 1973. Cohen's mother, Pennie (née Myers), was a psychologist. Cohen attended the University of Texas at Austin, where he received two bachelor's degrees, in finance and risk management, in 1984.

== Career ==
Cohen began his career with the Chubb Corporation working in Dallas, New York, and finally Denver in 1986. He briefly worked for Lowndes Lambert in London before returning to his family's Insurance Management Associates, opening a branch in Denver in 1989. In 1999, he became CEO and renamed the company IMA Financial Group, building a new headquarters in Denver to go along with the base in Wichita. He became chairman of the Denver Metro Chamber of Commerce in 2006.

Cohen has long been involved in sports in Denver. He was part of the group that secured funding for the Invesco Field at Mile High football stadium, which opened in 2001, housing the Denver Broncos of the National Football League (NFL). The same year, he co-founded the Metro Denver Sports Commission, through which he has attempted multiple bids to host the Winter Olympic Games. In 2023, he was involved in Denver's bid for a Women's National Basketball Association (WNBA) team. In 2024, he became the primary funder for Denver Summit FC in the National Women's Soccer League (NWSL).

== Personal life ==
Cohen and his wife, Molly (née Jenkins), married in 1990. They have four children.
