= Natalie Means =

American soccer player (born 2003)

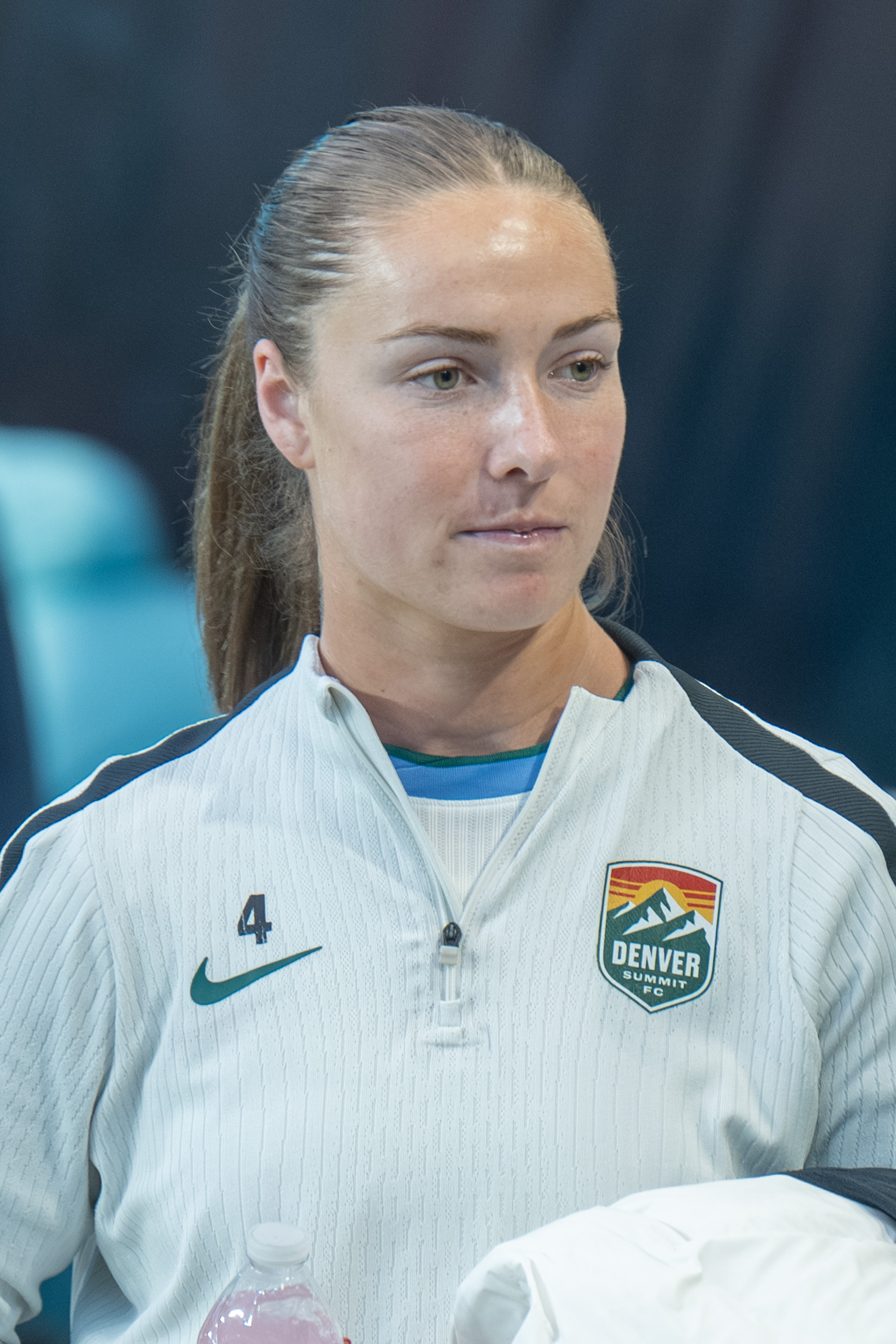
- Means with the Denver Summit in 2026

Personal information
- Date of birth: November 12, 2003 (age 22)
- Place of birth: Lafayette, California
- Height: 5 ft 6 in (1.68 m)
- Positions: Fullback; winger

Team information
- Current team: Denver Summit
- Number: 4

Youth career
- Lamorinda SC

College career
| Years | Team | Apps | (Gls) |
| 2022–2025 | Georgetown Hoyas | 79 | (21) |

Senior career*
| Years | Team | Apps | (Gls) |
| 2026– | Denver Summit | 26 | (1) |
- * Club domestic league appearances and goals as of 06:39, November 8, 2026 (UTC)

Natalie Means (born November 12, 2003) is an American professional soccer player who plays as a defender or winger for Denver Summit FC of the National Women's Soccer League (NWSL). She played college soccer for the Georgetown Hoyas.

== Early life ==
Means grew up in Lafayette, California, and attended Acalanes High School. She played club soccer for Lamorinda SC, where she competed in the Girls Academy and served as a team captain. She also participated in United States Youth National Team identification training.

== College career ==
Means played college soccer for the Georgetown Hoyas from 2022 to 2025. As a freshman in 2022, Means started all 22 matches for Georgetown, recording two goals and two assists and she was named to the All-BIG EAST Second Team and the All-BIG EAST Freshman Team. In 2023, Means made 21 appearances with 19 starts, scoring five goals. She was named to the All-BIG EAST First Team, the All-BIG EAST Tournament Team, and the United Soccer Coaches All-East Region Third Team, as Georgetown won the 2023 Big East Championship.

In 2024, Means started all 21 matches, recording five goals and seven assists. She earned All-BIG EAST First Team and United Soccer Coaches All-Region Second Team honors. In 2025, Means started all 23 matches, recording 10 goals and six assists. She was named a unanimous All-BIG EAST First Team selection and earned United Soccer Coaches All-Region First Team honors, as well as Scholar All-American recognition. She finished her collegiate career with 79 appearances and 21 goals.

== Club career ==
In January 2026, Means signed with Denver Summit FC ahead of the club's inaugural National Women's Soccer League season, agreeing to a two-year contract through 2027. She netted her first professional goal on July 18, 2026, scoring the late game-winner against the Portland Thorns from a tight angle.
