= Naomi Eto (footballer) =

Cameroonian footballer (born 2004)

- Eto with the Denver Summit in 2026

Personal information
- Full name: Naomi Leslie Ndjoah Eto
- Date of birth: 29 September 2004 (age 22)
- Place of birth: Yaoundé, Cameroon
- Position: Forward

Team information
- Current team: Denver Summit
- Number: 20

Senior career*
Years	Team	Apps	(Gls)
2021–2024	Amazones FAP		
2025	Guingamp	8	(0)
2025–2026	Paris Saint-Germain	0	(0)
2025–2026	→ Sassuolo (loan)	22	(3)
2026–	Denver Summit	2	(0)

International career
2023–2024	Cameroon U20	4	(1)
2024–	Cameroon	3	(1)
Medal record
Women's Africa Cup of Nations
Gold medal – first place	2026 Morocco
- * Club domestic league appearances and goals as of 1 November 2026

Naomi Leslie Ndjoah Eto (born 29 September 2004) is a Cameroonian professional footballer who plays as a forward for Denver Summit FC of the National Women's Soccer League (NWSL) and the Cameroon national team.

== Early life ==
Eto spent her childhood in the Science neighborhood—a modest area of the Cameroonian capital Yaoundé—and attended Etoug-Ebé High School.

== Club career ==
In 2020, Eto joined the Roger Milla Football Academy (RMFA) before moving to Amazones de FAP Yaoundé. In February 2025, she joined the French club En Avant Guingamp. In September 2025, Eto was signed by Paris Saint-Germain, who in turn loaned her to Sassuolo on a season long loan.

On 9 September 2026, the National Women's Soccer League (NWSL)'s Denver Summit FC announced the signing of Eto for an undisclosed transfer fee, signing the player to a two-year contract with the club option for another year.

== International career ==
Eto began to be called up by the Cameroonian Football Federation to wear the shirt of its youth teams. With the under 20 team, she played in the 2023 edition of the Sud Ladies Cup, an invitational tournament reserved for U20 teams that takes place in France, a competition that runs alongside the historic Maurice Revello Tournament reserved for men's teams. Here, she contributed to the Indomitable Lionesses reaching second place behind France. A year later, she participated, again with the U20 team, in the 2024 World Cup in Colombia, where Cameroon was making its debut in the FIFA competition. On that occasion, Eto particularly stood out despite her national team being eliminated in the round of 16, managing to score 4 goals.

In June 2026, Eto was included in Cameroon's squad for the 2026 Women's Africa Cup of Nations. Cameroon qualified for the 2027 FIFA Women's World Cup in Brazil and later won the entire tournament for the first time in their history.

== Honours ==
Cameroon

- Women's Africa Cup of Nations: 2026
