= Denver Summit FC =

Women's professional soccer club in Denver, Colorado

- Founded: January 30, 2025; 21 months ago
- Stadium: Centennial Stadium; Centennial, Colorado
- Owner(s): Robert L. Cohen; Peyton Manning; Mikaela Shiffrin
- President: Jen Millett
- Head coach: Nick Cushing
- League: National Women's Soccer League
- 2026: Regular season: 10th of 16; Playoffs: DNQ
- Website: denversummitfc.com
Home colors	Away colors

Denver Summit FC is an American professional soccer team based in the Denver metropolitan area that competes in the National Women's Soccer League (NWSL). It was announced as an expansion team by the league on January 30, 2025, and began play in the 2026 season. Summit FC play at a temporary stadium in Centennial, Colorado, and plan to build a soccer-specific stadium at Santa Fe Yards in Denver. The team's debut home match at Empower Field at Mile High set an NWSL attendance record with 63,004 spectators.

== History ==
In July 2023, an investment group called For Denver FC, led by former soccer player Jordan Angeli, sports executive Tom Dunmore, and insurance executive Ben Hubbard, announced their plans to bid for a franchise in the NWSL or USL Super League. They were joined by IMA Financial Group CEO Robert L. Cohen and venture capitalist Nicole Glaros. Other members of the ownership group included Mellody Hobson and Jason Wright of Ariel Investments. For Denver FC had been founded in 2022 as a grassroots group and organized outreach events, including watch parties for the United States women's national team during the 2023 FIFA Women's World Cup. In November 2024, the NWSL announced that Denver was one of three finalists, alongside Cincinnati and Cleveland, to become the league's 16th team which would begin play in 2026.

Denver was officially awarded the expansion bid by NWSL on January 30, 2025, and joined as the league's 16th team in the 2026 season. The ownership group, led by finance executive Rob Cohen, was reported by media outlets to have paid a league-record expansion fee of $110 million. The team is the first professional women's sports team in Colorado since the Colorado Xplosion of the American Basketball League folded in 1998.

On February 19, 2025, the ownership announced that the fans of the then-unnamed team would vote on the team's name with the following six names under consideration: Denver Peak FC, Colorado 14ers FC, Colorado Summit FC, Denver Elevate FC, Denver FC, and Denver Gold FC. On July 22, the team's ownership announced Denver Summit FC as the team's name.

On May 6, 2025, alpine skier and Vail native Mikaela Shiffrin joined the team's ownership group. On June 3, 2025, Pro Football Hall of Fame and former Denver Broncos quarterback Peyton Manning also joined the ownership group.

=== Inaugural season (2026) ===
Denver Summit played its first game on March 14, 2026, away at Bay FC losing 2–1. The Summit's home opener was played at Empower Field at Mile High on March 28, 2026, against Washington Spirit, setting a league attendance record of 63,004 spectators. The Summit would fail to qualify for the playoffs getting eliminated on the final day of the regular season with a 1-0 loss to North Carolina Courage. Denver would finish the season in 10th place with 41 points earned with a record of 11 wins, 8 draws, and 11 losses. Janine Sonis would be the top goalscorer on the team with 12 goals.

The team had an average attendance of 16,635 spectators—ranked second in the league overall. Summit FC played one match at Empower Field, four matches at Dick's Sporting Goods Park in Commerce City (home of the Colorado Rapids), and 10 matches at Centennial Stadium.

Empower Field at Mile High before the March 28, 2026, match

== Club identity ==
Secondary Logos

On July 22, 2025, the team ownership unveiled the team's name, crest, and secondary logos. The crest features a red sky and yellow sun, emblematic of Colorado's sunsets and red rock formations, and green mountains angled at 26º to commemorate the year 2026, the inaugural year for the team. Secondary logos include one featuring "5280" (Denver's elevation above sea level) and the letter "D." The crest and secondary logos were designed by Matthew Wolff who had created logos for numerous other NWSL teams.

== Stadium ==
The team plans to build its own 14,500-seat soccer-specific stadium at Santa Fe Yards in Denver's Baker neighborhood, which would be completed in 2028. Summit FC began construction of their stadium on October 1, 2026. The stadium is scheduled to open in either late 2028 or early 2029 with 12,500 fixed seats and additional standing room capacity to reach 13,000 spectators.

In March 2025, the team announced plans to build a temporary stadium at Potomac Street and Fremont Avenue in Centennial that would be used for their first two seasons. It would have 12,000 seats for use by the NWSL team before it is downsized into a 4,000-seat venue for school sports. The stadium would be on the grounds of the permanent training facilities in Centennial, which are planned to include eight soccer fields on 43 acres (17 ha), with $25 million in financing primarily provided by the Cherry Creek School District. The training center would be adjacent to the team headquarters and training facilities of the Denver Broncos. The home of the Colorado Rapids, Dick's Sporting Goods Park in Commerce City, was ruled out of serious consideration early in the process.

In November 2025, the team announced they were considering alternative locations for the stadium outside of the city of Denver amid delays in the approval of the stadium's public funding. Following the resolution of funding and zoning hurdles in December 2025, Denver Summit FC shifted focus to operational logistics for the inaugural 2026 season. The club announced it would execute a "three-stadium journey" while its permanent facilities remain under development.

== Players and staff ==
=== Current squad ===
As of October 5, 2026

No.	Pos.	Nation	Player
1	GK	USA	Abby Smith
2	DF	CAN	Megan Reid
3	DF	USA	Kaleigh Kurtz
4	DF	USA	Natalie Means
5	MF	USA	Devin Lynch
6	DF	CAN	Janine Sonis
7	DF	USA	Ayo Oke
8	MF	CAN	Emma Regan
9	FW	USA	Yazmeen Ryan
10	MF	USA	Lindsey Heaps
11	FW	USA	Ally Brazier
12	FW	USA	Jasmine Aikey
13	DF	ENG	Gemma Bonner
14	MF	USA	Yuna McCormack
15	MF	USA	Jordan Baggett
16	DF	USA	Carson Pickett
17	GK	USA	Jordan Nytes
18	FW	JPN	Yuzuki Yamamoto
20	FW	CMR	Naomi Eto
23	DF	USA	Eva Gaetino
24	MF	USA	Delanie Sheehan
25	FW	GER	Melissa Kössler
26	FW	ENG	Natasha Flint
30	DF	USA	Camryn Biegalski
33	FW	USA	Olivia Thomas
34	MF	USA	Meg Boade
36	GK	USA	Kat Asman (on loan from Orlando Pride)
79	FW	ESP	Nahikari García

==== Out on loan ====
No.	Pos.	Nation	Player
21	GK	FRA	Pauline Peyraud-Magnin (on loan to Crystal Palace until June 30, 2027)

=== Former players ===
For details of former players, see Category:Denver Summit FC players and List of Denver Summit FC players.

=== Coaching staff ===
As of August 20, 2025

Position	Staff
Head coach	Nick Cushing

== Records ==
=== Year-by-year ===
As of November 1, 2026

Season	Regular season									Playoffs	Top Scorer	Avg. attendance
Season	League	P	W	D	L	F	A	Pts	Pos	Playoffs	Top Scorer	Avg. attendance
2026	NWSL	30	11	8	11	53	42	41	10th	DNQ	Janine Sonis (12)	16,635

=== Team records ===
As of November 21, 2026. Current players in bold. Statistics are updated once a year after the conclusion of the NWSL season.

Most appearances
Player					Appearances				
#	Name	Nat.	Pos.	Summit career	NWSL	Playoffs	Cup	Other	Total
1	Kaleigh Kurtz	(United States)	DF	2026–	30	0	0	0	30
2	Devin Lynch	(United States)	MF	2026–	29	0	0	0	29
2	Ayo Oke	(United States)	DF	2026–	29	0	0	0	29
2	Yazmeen Ryan	(United States)	FW	2026–	29	0	0	0	29
2	Janine Sonis	(Canada)	DF	2026–	29	0	0	0	29
6	Natasha Flint	(England)	MF	2026–	28	0	0	0	28
6	Melissa Kössler	(Germany)	FW	2026–	28	0	0	0	28
6	Delanie Sheehan	(United States)	MF	2026–	28	0	0	0	28
9	Abby Smith	(United States)	GK	2026–	27	0	0	0	27
10	Natalie Means	(United States)	DF	2026–	26	0	0	0	26
10	Emma Regan	(Canada)	MF	2026–	26	0	0	0	26

Top goalscorers
Player					Appearances				
#	Name	Nat.	Pos.	Summit career	NWSL	Playoffs	Cup	Other	Total
1	Janine Sonis	(Canada)	DF	2026–	12	0	0	0	12
2	Natasha Flint	(England)	MF	2026–	8	0	0	0	8
2	Melissa Kössler	(Germany)	FW	2026–	8	0	0	0	8
4	Yazmeen Ryan	(United States)	FW	2026–	7	0	0	0	7
4	Lindsey Heaps	(United States)	MF	2026–	7	0	0	0	7
6	Yuzuki Yamamoto	(Japan)	MF	2026–	3	0	0	0	3
7	Delanie Sheehan	(United States)	MF	2026–	2	0	0	0	2
7	Olivia Thomas	(United States)	FW	2026–	2	0	0	0	2
