= Devin Lynch =

American soccer player (born 2003)

- Lynch with the Denver Summit in 2026

Personal information
- Date of birth: December 4, 2003 (age 22)
- Height: 5 ft 8 in (1.73 m)
- Position: Defensive midfielder

Team information
- Current team: Denver Summit
- Number: 5

Youth career
- Eclipse Select
- Sockers FC

College career
Years	Team	Apps	(Gls)
2022–2025	Duke Blue Devils	81	(13)

Senior career*
Years	Team	Apps	(Gls)
2024–2025	River Light FC	12	(6)
2026–	Denver Summit	29	(0)

International career^{‡}
2019	United States U17	4	(0)
- * Club domestic league appearances and goals as of 06:38, November 8, 2026 (UTC) ‡ National team caps and goals as of 05:26, April 2, 2026 (UTC)

Devin Lynch (born December 4, 2003) is an American professional soccer player who plays as a defensive midfielder for Denver Summit FC of the National Women's Soccer League (NWSL). She played college soccer for the Duke Blue Devils.

== Early life ==
Lynch is a native of Naperville, Illinois. She was introduced to soccer at the age of 5 and started playing for a club team three years later. In 2017, she helped youth team Eclipse Select SC reach the under-14 Elite Clubs National League final. She then moved to Sockers FC, where she contributed to a 2022 under-19 national finals appearance. Lynch also played basketball competitively through 8th grade, at which point she paused the sport due to the time commitment of soccer. As a senior at Waubonsie Valley High School, Lynch made the varsity basketball team after performing well at open gym sessions and was a consistent defensive contributor. Following her graduation, Lynch was listed on TopDrawerSoccer's Class of 2022 rankings as the 10th-best overall recruit and 3rd-best midfield recruit in the nation.

== College career ==
As a high school freshman, Lynch committed to a scholarship offer from Duke University. She officially signed for the Blue Devils in November 2021 and joined the team ahead of its 2022 season. In her freshman year, Lynch helped Duke reach the quarterfinals of the NCAA tournament, where she played 80 minutes, her second-highest total of the season, in the Blue Devils' loss to Alabama. As a sophomore in 2023, she played both as a forward and a midfielder as the Blue Devils failed to qualify for the NCAA tournament for the first time in nearly a decade. In both seasons, Lynch was a rotation player, starting in 16 of her 37 appearances. She made 5 assists, but failed to find the back of the net until her junior year.

Lynch had a breakout season in 2024. She helped Duke win the ACC regular season title after going undefeated in conference play and led the Blue Devils to the NCAA semifinals. She registered 7 goals and 10 assists, ranking second in the Atlantic Coast Conference for assists per game and tying for second in Duke program history with 7 regular season assists on the year. In September and October, she recorded 8 straight matches with either a goal or an assist. As a senior in 2025, Lynch started in all but 2 of her 22 appearances and helped the Blue Devils to yet another NCAA semifinal appearance. In November 2025, she earned a spot on the TopDrawerSoccer Team of the Week after tallying 2 assists in Duke's regular-season finale against Clemson and a game-winning goal in Duke's ACC quarterfinal win over Louisville. The accolade capped off an 8-match run in which Lynch recorded a goal contribution in 7 different games.

== Club career ==
During college, Lynch gained experience with River Light FC of the pre-professional USL W League. In the offseason before her junior season at Duke in 2024, she registered 6 goals, 2 assists, and 761 minutes played as she guided River Light to the USL W League playoffs in its first-ever season. Lynch returned to the team in 2025 and made 2 appearances in her second season.

On January 17, 2026, NWSL expansion club Denver Summit FC announced the signing of Lynch to her first professional contract, a one-year deal, ahead of the team's inaugural season of play. Lynch made her pro debut on March 14, 2026, starting and playing 87 minutes in Denver's first-ever match, a 2–1 loss to Bay FC. She soon became a regular piece for the Summit and was one of only three rookies in the NWSL to start every match of the first four months of the season. In July 2026, she extended her contract with Denver through 2028 with a mutual option for an extra season.

== International career ==
Lynch received her first invitation to the United States under-15 national team at age 13, earning a call-up to a 2017 training camp alongside Eclipse Select teammate Korbin Albert. She continued receiving youth national team invitations throughout her early years, including those to the under-16 and under-17 national teams. In 2019, she logged 4 appearances (2 starts) for the U17 national team.

== Personal life ==
Lynch is the daughter of Art and Jackie Lynch. Her father played soccer at Columbia University from 1984 to 1987. She also has three brothers, two of whom played college soccer as well; one of the two, Sean, played for the Northwestern Wildcats, while the other, Colin, played for the Ohio State Buckeyes and the Case Western Reserve Spartans.

== Honors and awards ==
Duke Blue Devils

- Atlantic Coast Conference: 2024
