= Yuzuki Yamamoto =

Japanese association football player

- Yamamoto with the Denver Summit in 2026

Personal information
- Full name: Yuzuki Yamamoto
- Date of birth: 1 September 2002 (age 24)
- Place of birth: Gifu Prefecture, Japan
- Height: 1.65 m (5 ft 5 in)
- Position: Forward

Team information
- Current team: Denver Summit
- Number: 18

Youth career
- JFC Kakegawa
- –2014: FC Persimmon
- 2015–2020: Tokyo Verdy Menina

Senior career*
Years	Team	Apps	(Gls)
2021–2025	Tokyo Verdy Beleza	86	(19)
2026–	Denver Summit	14	(3)

International career^{‡}
2018	Japan U17	4	(1)
2019	Japan U19	2	(0)
2022	Japan U20	6	(3)
2025–	Japan	10	(1)
- * Club domestic league appearances and goals as of 1 November 2026 ‡ National team caps and goals as of 07:28, 20 April 2026 (UTC)

Yuzuki Yamamoto (born 1 September 2002) is a Japanese professional footballer who plays as a forward for Denver Summit FC of the National Women's Soccer League (NWSL) and the Japan national team.

== Club career ==
Yamamoto made her WE League debut for Tokyo Verdy Beleza on 18 September 2021. In 2025, she helped Tokyo Verdy Beleza secure the WE League championship.

On 18 March 2026, National Women's Soccer League (NWSL) expansion club Denver Summit announced that they had signed Yamamoto to a two-year contract with a mutual option for a third year. On 29 August 2026, she scored her first goal for the club in a 6–1 win over the Chicago Stars.

== International career ==
Yamamoto has represented Japan at the youth international level. In 2018, she was a member of the Japanese squad that competed in the FIFA U-17 Women's World Cup. In 2022, she helped the under-20 national team finish the FIFA U-20 Women's World Cup as runners-up, contributing 3 goals and 3 assists along the way.

Yamamoto debuted for the Japan national team in 2025. The following year, she was named to Japan's squad for the 2026 AFC Women's Asian Cup. In the tournament group stage, she recorded a goal and two assists in a 11–0 win over India.

== International goals ==
No.	Date	Venue	Opponent	Score	Result	Competition
1	7 March 2026	Perth Rectangular Stadium, Perth, Australia	India	1–0	11–0	2026 AFC Women's Asian Cup
