= Melissa Kössler =

German footballer (born 2000)

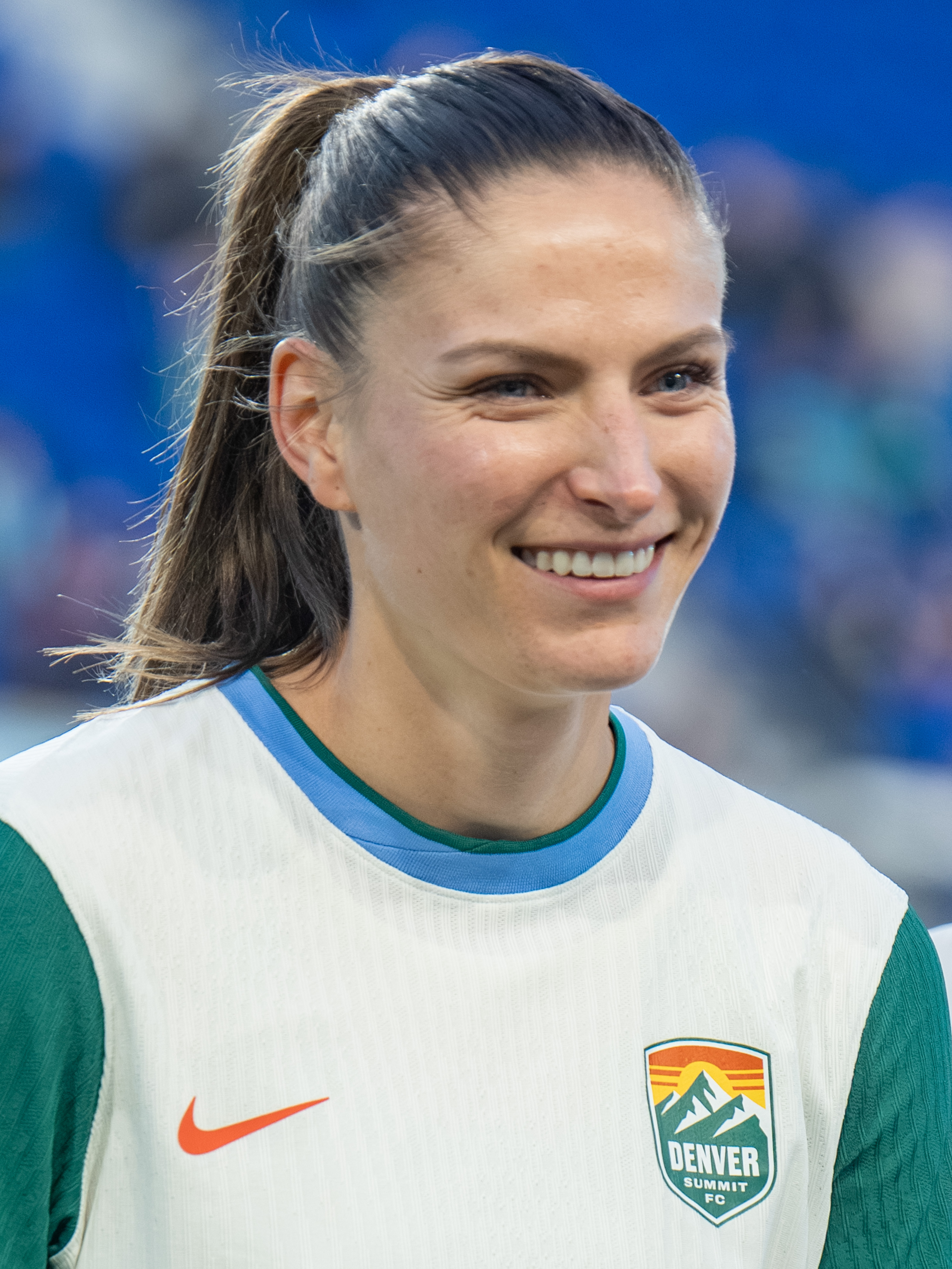
- Kössler with the Denver Summit in 2026

Personal information
- Full name: Klara Melissa Kössler
- Date of birth: 4 March 2000 (age 26)
- Place of birth: Potsdam, Germany
- Height: 1.78 m (5 ft 10 in)
- Position: Striker

Team information
- Current team: Denver Summit
- Number: 25

Youth career
- 2006–2017: Turbine Potsdam

College career
Years	Team	Apps	(Gls)
2019	UMass Minutewomen	16	(11)

Senior career*
Years	Team	Apps	(Gls)
2016–2019	Turbine Potsdam II	40	(27)
2017–2019	Turbine Potsdam	10	(0)
2020–2022	Turbine Potsdam	43	(14)
2022–2025	TSG Hoffenheim	58	(25)
2026–	Denver Summit	28	(8)

International career^{‡}
2016	Germany U16	1	(0)
2016–2017	Germany U17	16	(6)
2017–2019	Germany U19	26	(12)
2023–	Germany	6	(2)
Medal record
Women's football
Representing Germany
UEFA Women's Under-19 Championship
Runner-up	2018 Switzerland
Runner-up	2019 Scotland
UEFA Women's Under-17 Championship
Winner	2017 Czech Republic
- * Club domestic league appearances and goals as of 06:37, 8 November 2026 (UTC) ‡ National team caps and goals as of 21:21, 13 October 2026 (UTC)

Klara Melissa Kössler (born 4 March 2000) is a German professional footballer who plays as a striker for Denver Summit FC of the National Women's Soccer League (NWSL) and the Germany national team. She previously played for Turbine Potsdam and TSG Hoffenheim and played college soccer for the UMass Minutewomen.

== Club career ==
Kössler played from 2006 to 2017 for Turbine Potsdam, progressing through all youth teams from U7 to U17. She won the German Under-17 Championship in 2015 and 2016, and finished runners-up in 2017, while already mostly playing for the second team in the 2016–17 season of 2. Bundesliga North. Ahead of the following 2017–18 season she signed a two-year contract with the first team and made her debut in the 2018 German Cup semi-final. Just three days later she also made her league debut, starting in a home win against SC Freiburg. Despite further Bundesliga appearances, she mostly played for the second team through the following 2018–19 season.

In summer 2019, she moved to the United States to join the UMass Minutewomen at the University of Massachusetts Amherst for a dual career in academics and soccer. After one year with 11 goals in 16 games for the varsity team, she returned to Potsdam. On the first 2020–21 matchday she scored her first Bundesliga goal in a home win against her future club TSG Hoffenheim. She became a regular starter and finished her next and final season in Potsdam, 2021–22, with ten league goals and as German Cup 2022 runners-up to VfL Wolfsburg, who won their eighth consecutive title.

For the 2022–23 season she joined league rivals TSG Hoffenheim. She again scored on a season's first matchday in an away victory against FC Köln. She netted 25 goals across four Bundesliga seasons, started TSG Hoffenheim's second-ever German Cup semi-final in 2025, and finished in the upper half of the table in her eighth top-flight seasons.

On 15 January 2026, National Women's Soccer League (NWSL) expansion club Denver Summit FC announced the signing of Kössler on a two-year contract. She became the first player in NWSL history to score a new club's first three goals.

== International career ==
Kössler made her international debut for the U16 national team in a victory over Austria in May 2016. After one game she joined the U17 national team and qualified with the team for the 2017 UEFA European Under-17 Championship in Czechia. She scored three goals in the two opening victories and was named the tournament's top scorer. She then also scored in both the semi-final and final penalty shoot-outs, with her final penalty securing the U17 European championship against Spain.

In September 2017, the same year, she joined the U19 national team, with which she qualified for the 2018 UEFA European Under-19 Championship in Switzerland. She scored the opener in the semi-final and finished as runner-up after a 0–1 final defeat against Spain. She then again qualified with the team for the 2019 UEFA European Under-19 Championship in Scotland. As in 2017, she scored three goals: the first-match opener, the second-match goal against Belgium – voted second-most spectacular Goal of the Month (the only one by a woman among five nominees) – and the semi-final opener against the Netherlands. The 1–2 final defeat against France was her second consecutive runner-up and third consecutive final. Kössler also finished joint second in the tournament's scoring list and, as in the previous two championships, played in all tournament matches.

In June 2023, she made her senior international debut for Germany in the team's penultimate international before the 2023 FIFA World Cup. She has since appeared in a UEFA Euro 2025 qualifying match and two 2027 FIFA World Cup qualifying matches, all of which Germany won.

== Career statistics ==
=== International ===
As of match played 13 October 2026

Appearances and goals by national team and year
National team	Year	Apps	Goals
Germany	2023	1	0
Germany	2024	1	0
Germany	2026	4	2
Total		6	2

Scores and results list Germany's goal tally first, score column indicates score after each Kössler goal.

List of international goals scored by Melissa Kössler
No.	Date	Venue	Opponent	Score	Result	Competition
1	9 October 2026	Wildparkstadion, Karlsruhe, Germany	Australia	1–0	4–2	Friendly
2	9 October 2026	Wildparkstadion, Karlsruhe, Germany	Australia	2–0	4–2	Friendly

== Honours ==
Turbine Potsdam U17

- German Under-17 Championship: 2015, 2016; runner-up 2017

Turbine Potsdam

- DFB-Pokal runner-up: 2021–22

Germany U17

- UEFA Under-17 Championship: 2017

Germany U19

- UEFA Under-19 Championship runner-up: 2018, 2019

Individual

- UEFA Under-17 Championship top scorer: 2017
- UEFA Under-17 Championship Team of the Tournament: 2017
