= Emma Regan =

Canadian soccer player (born 2000)

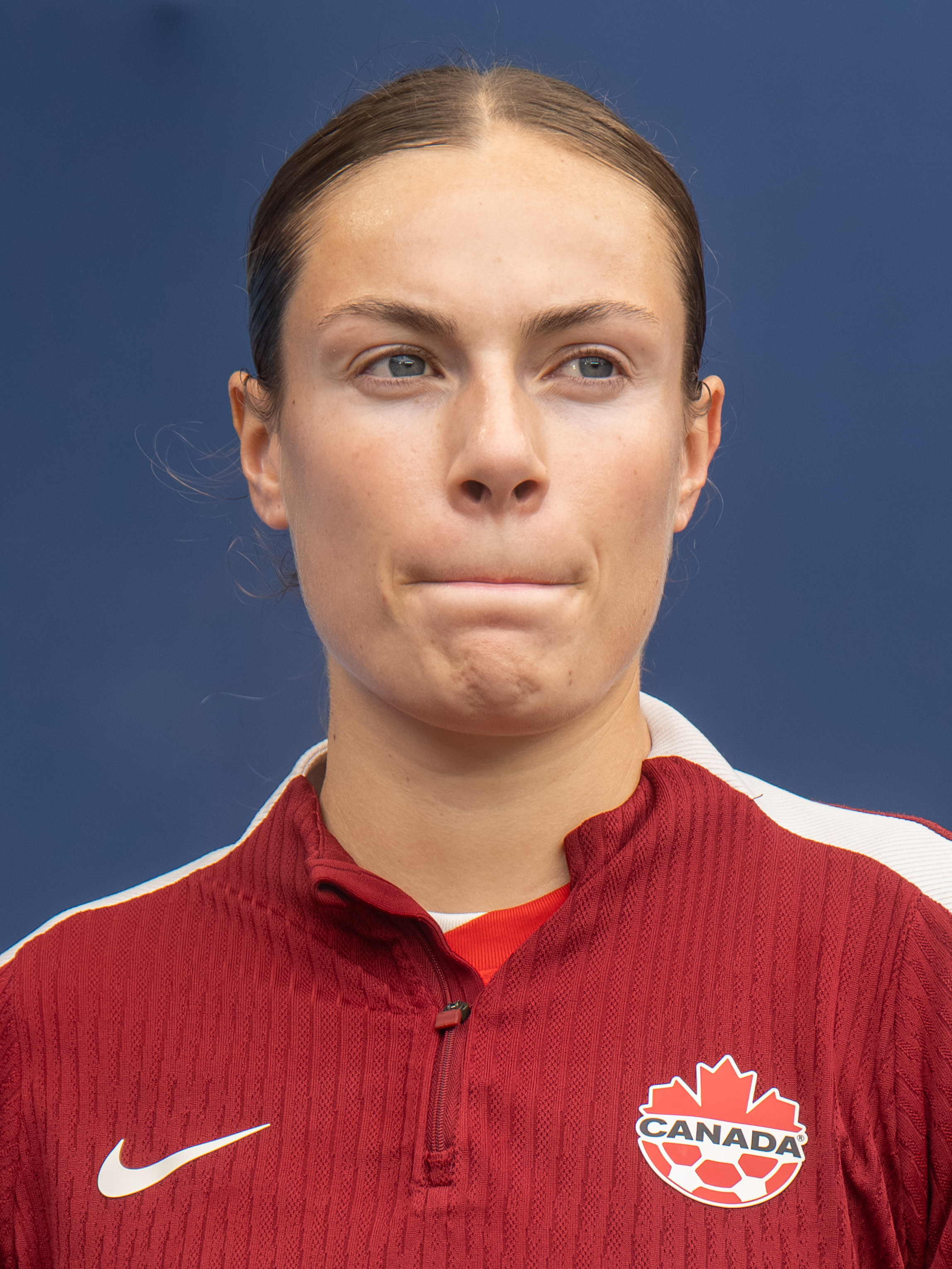
- Regan with Canada in 2026

Personal information
- Full name: Emma Rose Regan
- Date of birth: January 28, 2000 (age 26)
- Place of birth: North Vancouver, British Columbia, Canada
- Height: 1.69 m (5 ft 7 in)
- Positions: Midfielder; center back

Team information
- Current team: Denver Summit
- Number: 8

Youth career
- Burnaby Girls SC
- Mountain United SC
- Vancouver Whitecaps Girls Elite

College career
Years	Team	Apps	(Gls)
2018–2022	Texas Longhorns	90	(4)

Senior career*
Years	Team	Apps	(Gls)
2018	TSS FC Rovers		(2)
2022	Varsity FC		(2)
2023–2024	HB Køge	44	(3)
2025	AFC Toronto	25	(3)
2026–	Denver Summit	26	(0)

International career^{‡}
2014	Canada U15	6	(0)
2016	Canada U17	7	(0)
2015–2018	Canada U20	11	(0)
2018–	Canada	23	(1)
- * Club domestic league appearances and goals as of 06:40, November 8, 2026 (UTC) ‡ National team caps and goals as of October 12, 2026

Emma Rose Regan (born January 28, 2000) is a Canadian professional soccer player who plays as a midfielder or center back for Denver Summit FC of the National Women's Soccer League (NWSL) and the Canada national team.

== Early life ==
Regan began playing youth soccer at age six with Burnaby Girls SC. She later played for Mountain United FC, before joining the Vancouver Whitecaps REX program. She also played for the British Columbia provincial team. She also represented BC at the 2017 Canada Summer Games, where she was selected as the province's flag-bearer for the opening ceremonies. She served as the Vancouver Whitecaps captain since 2014 and was named "Most Promising Player" in 2015, also being named the BC Soccer Youth Player of the Year in 2015.

== College career ==
She began attending the University of Texas at Austin in 2018 playing for the women's soccer team. She was named to the 2018 Top Drawer Soccer National Preseason Best XI Freshman Team, the 2019 Preseason All-Big 12 Conference Team, and the 2019 All-Big 12 Conference Second Team. She scored her first goal on October 9, 2020, against the Kansas State Wildcats. In 2021 and 2022, she was again named to the All-Big 12 Conference Second Team and was named to the United Soccer Coaches All-Midwest Region Third Team in 2021. In 2022, she was named the 2022 Big 12 Conference Soccer Co-Scholar Athlete of the Year and was a four time Academic All-Big 12 First Team.

== Club career ==
In 2018, she played with TSS FC Rovers in the Women's Premier Soccer League, scoring two goals.

In 2022, she joined Varsity FC of League1 British Columbia. She won the league title that season with Varsity.

In January 2023, she signed her first professional contract with Danish club HB Køge. She made her debut on March 11, in a league cup match against FC Thy-Thisted Q. On May 5, 2023, she scored her first goal for the club against Kolding. She won the 2022-23 league title with the club in her first season. At the end of the 2024 season, she departed the club to return to North America.

In December 2024, Regan signed with AFC Toronto ahead of the inaugural Northern Super League season, becoming the first active Canadian national team player to join the new league. She was named the club's first ever captain. She scored her first goal in a 2–0 victory over Montreal Roses FC. At the end of the season, she won the league's Midfielder of the Year award and was named to the league's Team of the Season.

On January 14, 2026, NWSL expansion team Denver Summit FC announced that they had signed Regan to a three-year contract with a mutual option ahead of the club's inaugural season of play.

== International career ==
She debuted for the Canada U15 team at the 2014 CONCACAF Girls' U-15 Championship, helping Canada win the championship, being named a tournament all-star.

She has also represented the Canada U17 and Canada U20. She debuted with the U20 team as a 15 year old in 2015, and played as a 16 year old at the 2016 FIFA U-20 Women's World Cup. She was again called up for the 2020 CONCACAF Women's U-20 Championship.

Regan earned her first call-up to the Canada senior team in June 2018, ahead of a friendly against Germany. She was then called up for the 2018 CONCACAF Women's Championship, making her senior debut against Cuba on October 8, 2018. In October 2023, she was called up to the senior team again, for the first time since her last call-up five years earlier. On June 27, 2025, she scored her first international goal in a 4–1 victory over Costa Rica.

== Career statistics ==
=== International goals ===
Scores and results list Canada's goal tally first, score column indicates score after each Regan goal.

List of international goals scored by Emma Regan
No.	Date	Venue	Opponent	Score	Result	Competition
1	June 27, 2025	BMO Field, Toronto, Canada	Costa Rica	4–1	4–1	Friendly
