= 2025 Washington Spirit season =

Washington Spirit soccer season

Washington Spirit
2025 season
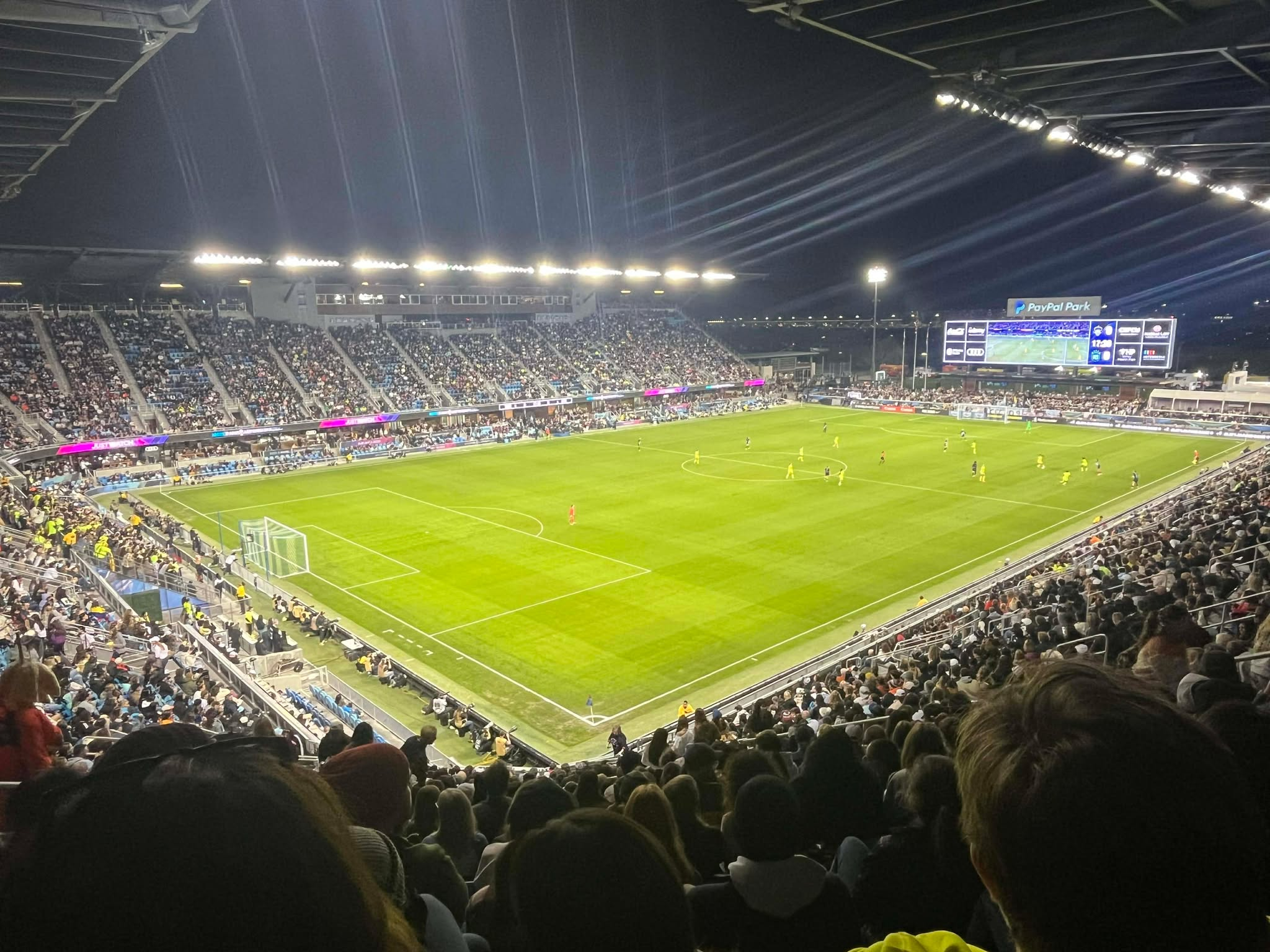
- The Spirit playing in the 2025 NWSL Championship game
- Owner: Y. Michele Kang
- General manager: Mark Krikorian
- Head coach: Adrián González (since June); Jonatan Giráldez (until June)
- Stadium: Audi Field (capacity: 20,000)
- League: 2nd
- 2025 NWSL Challenge Cup: Winner
- NWSL playoffs: Runners up
- CONCACAF W Champions Cup (25–26): Knockout stage
- Top goalscorer: Gift Monday (8)
- Highest home attendance: 19,365 (Nov 15 vs. POR)
- Lowest home attendance: 11,691 (Aug 15 vs. LOU)
- Average home league attendance: 15,796
- Biggest win: 4 goals (Sep 28 vs. HOU)
- Biggest defeat: 3 goals (Apr 26 vs. GFC)
| Home colors | Away colors |
- All statistics correct as of November 20, 2025.

The 2025 Washington Spirit season is the team's thirteenth season as a professional women's soccer team. The Spirit play in the National Women's Soccer League (NWSL), the top tier of women's soccer in the United States. They will also be participating in the 2025–26 CONCACAF W Champions Cup as a consequence of finishing as the regular season and playoff runners-up in the 2024 season; this marks the first time they have participated in a continental competition.

== Background ==
The Spirit finished the 2024 National Women's Soccer League season as runner-up in the NWSL playoffs, losing to Orlando Pride in the 2024 NWSL Championship. This was to be Jonatan Giráldez's first full year with the Spirit after joining the team midway through last season in June 2024; however, in June 2025, the Spirit announced that he would become the head coach of OL Lyonnes in time for the start of the 2025-26 Première Ligue. Both the Spirit and OL Lyonnes are owned by Michelle Kang. He was replaced by Adrián González.

== Stadium and facilities ==
The Spirit continue to play in Audi Field, their full-time home since the team's 2022 season, and train at the United Performance Center in Leesburg, Virginia, a facility shared with D.C. United, D.C. United's youth academy, and Loudoun United FC.

== Broadcasting ==
In addition to the league's national and international broadcast agreements, five Spirit matches of the 2025 season will air on the regional Monumental Sports Network, continuing last year's partnership when ten matches were broadcast on the channel.

== Team ==
=== Staff ===
As of March 29, 2025.

Sporting operations staff
| General manager President of soccer operations | James Hocke and Nathan Minion (acting) |
| Assistant general manager | Nathan Minion |

Sporting staff
| Head coach | Jonatan Giráldez |
| Assistant coach | Adrián González |
| Assistant coach Director of player personnel | Mike Bristol |
| Player development coach | Morinao Imaizumi |
| Assistant coach Player development coach | Mami Yamaguchi |

Performance staff
| Vice president of performance, medical, and innovation | Dawn Scott |
| Senior director of performance | Elisa Angeles |
| Director of data and analytics | Seungbeum Lee |
| Director of medical | Eric Marchek |
| Director of mental performance | David McHugh |
| Head athletic trainer | Alessandro Ciarla |

=== Players ===
As of March 26, 2025

| No. | Nat. | Name | Date of birth (age) | Since | Previous team | Notes (Note: denotes a season-ending injury.) |
Goalkeepers
| 1 | (United States) | Aubrey Kingsbury (captain) | November 20, 1991 (aged 33) | 2018 | (United States) Orlando Pride | |
| 18 | (United States) | Lyza Jessee | July 27, 2001 (aged 23) | 2023 | (United States) Gonzaga University | SEI |
| 28 | (Scotland) | Sandy MacIver | June 18, 1998 (aged 26) | 2025 | (England) Manchester City | INT |
| 31 | (United States) | Kaylie Collins | May 17, 1998 (aged 26) | 2024 | (United States) Orlando Pride | |
Defenders
| 3 | (United States) | Casey Krueger | August 23, 1990 (aged 34) | 2024 | (United States) Chicago Red Stars | |
| 4 | (Mexico) | Rebeca Bernal | August 31, 1997 (aged 27) | 2025 | (Mexico) C.F. Monterrey | INT |
| 6 | (United States) | Kate Wiesner | February 11, 2001 (aged 24) | 2024 | (United States) Penn State Nittany Lions | |
| 9 | (United States) | Tara McKeown | July 2, 1999 (aged 25) | 2021 | (United States) USC Trojans | |
| 21 | (Canada) | Gabrielle Carle | October 12, 1998 (aged 26) | 2022 | (Sweden) Kristianstads DFF | |
| 24 | (England) | Esme Morgan | October 18, 2000 (aged 24) | 2024 | (England) Manchester City | INT |
| 25 | (France) | Kysha Sylla | February 4, 2004 (aged 21) | 2025 | (France) Olympique Lyonnais | LIN, INT |
| 26 | (United States) | Paige Metayer | January 23, 2001 (aged 24) | 2023 | (United States) California Golden Bears | D45 |
| 34 | (United States) | Kiley Dulaney | | 2025 | (United States) Arkansas Razorbacks | STR |
| | (Uganda) | Shadia Nankya | November 25, 2001 (aged 23) | 2025 | (Egypt) FC Masar | LOA, INT |
Midfielders
| 5 | (Japan) | Narumi Miura | July 3, 1997 (aged 27) | 2025 | (United States) North Carolina Courage | INT |
| 7 | (United States) | Croix Bethune | March 14, 2001 (aged 24) | 2024 | (United States) Georgia Bulldogs | |
| 10 | (Colombia) | Leicy Santos | May 16, 1996 (aged 28) | 2024 | (Spain) Atlético Madrid | |
| 12 | (United States) | Andi Sullivan | December 20, 1995 (aged 29) | 2018 | (United States) Stanford Cardinal | SEI |
| 16 | (United States) | Courtney Brown | November 25, 2000 (aged 24) | 2024 | (United States) Utah Utes | |
| 17 | (United States) | Hal Hershfelt | October 3, 2001 (aged 23) | 2024 | (United States) Clemson Tigers | |
| 22 | (United States) | Heather Stainbrook | March 14, 2001 (aged 24) | 2024 | (United States) Utah Valley Wolverines | |
| 39 | (United States) | Chloe Ricketts | May 23, 2007 (aged 17) | 2023 | (United States) AFC Ann Arbor | U18 |
| 35 | (United States) | Meg Boade | | 2025 | (United States) UCLA Bruins | STR |
| | (Nigeria) | Deborah Abiodun | November 2, 2003 (aged 21) | 2025 | (United States) Pittsburgh Panthers | LOA, INT |
Forwards
| 2 | (United States) | Trinity Rodman | May 20, 2002 (aged 22) | 2021 | | |
| 8 | (United States) | Makenna Morris | April 26, 2002 (aged 22) | 2024 | (United States) Clemson Tigers | |
| 11 | (France) | Ouleymata Sarr | October 8, 1995 (aged 29) | 2024 | (France) Paris FC | INT, SEI |
| 13 | (United States) | Brittany Ratcliffe | February 7, 1994 (aged 31) | 2024 | (United States) North Carolina Courage | |
| 19 | (Ivory Coast) | Rosemonde Kouassi | December 26, 2001 (aged 23) | 2024 | (France) FC Fleury 91 Cœur d’Essonne | INT |
| 33 | (United States) | Ashley Hatch | May 25, 1995 (aged 29) | 2018 | (United States) North Carolina Courage | |
| | (United States) | Emma Gaines-Ramos | March 18, 2002 (aged 22) | 2025 | (United States) San Diego State Aztecs | SEI |
| | (Nigeria) | Gift Monday | December 9, 2001 (aged 23) | 2025 | (Spain) UD Tenerife | INT |
| 36 | (United States) | Margie Detrizio | September 17, 2001 (aged 23) | 2025 | (United States) Georgia Bulldogs | STR |
| | (Brazil) | Tamara Bolt | May 12, 2003 (aged 21) | 2025 | (Brazil) SC Internacional | LOA, INT |

(SEI) Season-Ending Injury, (INT) International Slot, (D45) 45-day injury list, (STR) Short-Term Injury Replacement, (LOA) Loaned out, (LIN) Loaned in

=== International slots ===
The Spirit currently possess nine international roster slots.

| No. | Status | Nat. | Player | Player/Slot Notes | Ref |
7 baseline slots
| 1 | Occupied | (Colombia) | Leicy Santos | | |
| 2 | Occupied | (England) | Esme Morgan | | |
| 3 | Occupied | (Mexico) | Rebeca Bernal | | |
| 4 | Occupied | (Ivory Coast) | Rosemonde Kouassi | | |
| 5 | Occupied | (Japan) | Narumi Miura | | |
| 6 | Occupied | (Scotland) | Sandy MacIver | | |
| 7 | Occupied | (France) | Kysha Sylla | | |
Acquired slots
| 8 | Occupied | (Nigeria) | Gift Monday | Jan 17, 2025 from Orlando Pride for $50,000, 2025 only | |
| 9 | Unoccupied | | | Mar 11, 2025 from Racing Louisville FC for $80,000, 2025 only | |
Rostered international players not using a slot
| | SEI | (France) | Ouleye Sarr | Season-ending injury from 2024 | |
| | Loaned out | (Uganda) | Shadia Nankya | On loan to Dallas Trinity FC through 2025 | |
| | Loaned out | (Nigeria) | Deborah Abiodun | On loan to Dallas Trinity FC through 2025 | |
| | Loaned out | (Brazil) | Tamara Bolt | On loan to Dallas Trinity FC through 2025 | |
| | US Resident | (Canada) | Gabrielle Carle | Established residency (Green Card) | |

== Competitions ==
Win Draw Loss

=== NWSL ===
==== Standings ====
| Pos | Team | Pld | W | D | L | GF | GA | GD | Pts | Qualification |
|---|---|---|---|---|---|---|---|---|---|---|
| 1 | Kansas City Current (S) | 26 | 21 | 2 | 3 | 49 | 13 | +36 | 65 | Playoffs and CONCACAF W Champions Cup |
| 2 | Washington Spirit | 26 | 12 | 8 | 6 | 42 | 33 | +9 | 44 | Playoffs and CONCACAF W Champions Cup |
| 3 | Portland Thorns FC | 26 | 11 | 7 | 8 | 36 | 29 | +7 | 40 | Playoffs |
| 4 | Orlando Pride | 26 | 11 | 7 | 8 | 33 | 27 | +6 | 40 | Playoffs |
| 5 | Seattle Reign FC | 26 | 10 | 9 | 7 | 32 | 29 | +3 | 39 | Playoffs |

Source: NWSL
Rules for classification: 1) points; 2) total goal difference; 3) total wins; 4) total goals scored; 5) head-to-head points; 6) head-to-head goals scored; 7) fewest disciplinary points; 8) coin toss (if 2 clubs tied) or drawing of lots (if ≥3 clubs tied).
(S) NWSL Shield

==== Results summary ====
| Overall | | | | | | | | Home | | | | | | Away | | | | | |
| Pld | W | D | L | GF | GA | GD | Pts | W | D | L | GF | GA | GD | W | D | L | GF | GA | GD |
|---|---|---|---|---|---|---|---|---|---|---|---|---|---|---|---|---|---|---|---|
| 9 | 5 | 1 | 3 | 16 | 15 | +1 | 16 | 1 | 1 | 3 | 8 | 12 | −4 | 4 | 0 | 0 | 8 | 3 | +5 |

Last updated: 17 May 2025.
Source: NWSLsoccer.com

==== Matches ====
| March 14, 2025 1 | Houston Dash | 1–2 | Washington Spirit | Houston, Texas |
| 7:00 p.m. CDT (UTC-5) | Graham 75' | Report | Morris 16'; Hatch 33'; Carle (yellow card) 35'; Bernal (yellow card) 90+8' | Stadium: Shell Energy Stadium; Referee: Matthew Thompson (Mississippi) |

| March 22, 2025 2 | Washington Spirit | 0-2 | Kansas City Current | Washington, DC |
| 7:30 p.m. EDT (UTC-4) | | Report | Hutton (yellow card) 33'; Labonta 56' (pen.); Rodriguez (yellow card) 83'; Labonta (yellow card) 90+6'; Chawinga 90+8' | Stadium: Audi Field; Attendance: 19,254; Referee: Elijio Arreguin (California) |

| March 28, 2025 3 | Washington Spirit | 2–0 | Bay FC | Washington, DC |
| 8:00 p.m. EDT (UTC-4) | Hatch 24', 27'; Santos (yellow card) 51'; Hatch (yellow card) 53' | Report | | Stadium: Audi Field; Referee: Natalie Simon (Florida) |

| April 12, 2025 4 | Racing Louisville FC | 0–2 | Washington Spirit | Louisville, KY |
| 5:00 p.m. CDT (UTC-5) | | Report | Santos 58'; Hatch 75' | Stadium: Lynn Family Stadium; Attendance: 7,886; Referee: Matthew Corrigan (Virginia) |

| April 19, 2025 5 | Orlando Pride | 0–1 | Washington Spirit | Orlando, FL |
| 5:00 p.m. EDT (UTC-4) | Lemos (yellow card) 90+4' | Report | Monday 64' | Stadium: Inter&Co Stadium; Attendance: 9,021; Referee: Elton Garcia (Texas) |

| April 26, 2025 6 | Washington Spirit | 0–3 | Gotham FC | Washington, DC |
| 1:00 p.m. EDT (UTC-4) | Miura (yellow card) 51' | Report | Schupansky 4'; Martin (yellow card) 11'; González 33' (pen.), 41'; Reale (yellow card) 45+6'; Howell (yellow card) 85' | Stadium: Audi Field; Attendance: 16,443; Referee: Abdou Ndiaye (Louisiana) |

| May 2, 2025 7 | Washington Spirit | 3–4 | Angel City FC | Washington, DC |
| 8:00 p.m. EDT (UTC-4) | Morgan 30', 89'; Monday (yellow card) 35' (goal) 40' | Report | Tiernan 8', 90+8'; G. Thompson 22'; Fuller (yellow card) 25'; Zelem 72'; King (yellow card) 83' | Stadium: Audi Field; Attendance: 13,738; Referee: Shawn Tehini (North Carolina) |

| May 10, 2025 8 | Chicago Stars | 2–3 | Washington Spirit | Bridgeview, IL |
| 11:50 a.m. CDT (UTC-5) | Grosso 36'; Staab 54' | Report | Schlegel 31' (o.g.); Kouassi 41'; Monday 83'; McKeown (yellow card) 90+9' | Stadium: SeatGeek Stadium; Attendance: 3,425; Referee: Trevor Wiseman (California) |

| May 17, 2025 9 | Washington Spirit | 3–3 | Utah Royals | Washington, DC |
| 7:30 p.m. EDT (UTC-4) | Hatch 17'; Boade 20'; Krueger 90+13' | Report | Mozingo 9'; Kizer 22'; Bernal 36' (o.g.) | Stadium: Audi Field; Attendance: 15,016; Referee: Danielle Chesky (Virginia) |

| May 23, 2025 10 | Seattle Reign | 1–2 | Washington Spirit | Seattle, Washington |
| 7:00 p.m. PDT (UTC-7) | Holmes 18' (yellow card) 55' | Report | Bethune 11'; Hatch 35'; Miura (yellow card) 50' | Stadium: Lumen Field; Attendance: 7,080; Referee: Brad Jensen (Utah) |

| June 8, 2025 11 | Washington Spirit | 3–1 | North Carolina Courage | Washington, DC |
| 4:00 p.m. EDT (UTC-4) | Brown 24'; Ratcliffe 27'; Monday 58' | Report | Matsukubo 32' | Stadium: Audi Field; Attendance: 17,626; Referee: Brandon Stevis (California) |

| June 15, 2025 12 | Portland Thorns | 2–0 | Washington Spirit | Portland, Oregon |
| 1:00 p.m. PDT (UTC-7) | Turner 38'; Tordin 81'; Coffey (yellow card) 87' | Report | Hershfelt (yellow card) 38'; Miura (yellow card) 73' | Stadium: Providence Park; Attendance: 21,268; Referee: Joshua Encarnación (Pennsylvania) |

| June 22, 2025 13 | San Diego Wave FC | 0–0 | Washington Spirit | San Diego, California |
| 7:00 p.m. PDT (UTC-7) | Corley (yellow card) 41' | Report | Hershfelt (yellow card) 49'; Sylla (yellow card) 71'; Kouassi (yellow card) 81' | Stadium: Snapdragon Stadium; Attendance: 12,011; Referee: Matthew Corrigan (Virginia) |

| August 3, 2025 14 | Washington Spirit | 2–1 | Portland Thorns | Washington, DC |
| 12:30 p.m. EDT (UTC-4) | Bethune (yellow card) 10'; Monday 18'; Morgan (yellow card) 41'; Rodman 90+2' | Report | Torpey (yellow card) 18'; Moultrie 45+3' | Stadium: Audi Field; Attendance: 16,007; Referee: Brad Jensen (Utah) |

| August 9, 2025 15 | Gotham FC | 0–0 | Washington Spirit | Harrison, NJ |
| 12:00 p.m. EDT (UTC-4) | Geyse (red card) 30'; Lavelle (yellow card) 59'; González (yellow card) 72' | Report | Wiesner (yellow card) 11'; Miura (yellow card) 61' | Stadium: Sports Illustrated Stadium; Attendance: 13,860; Referee: Jaclyn Metz (Washington) |

| August 15, 2025 16 | Washington Spirit | 2–2 | Racing Louisville FC | Washington, DC |
| 8:00 p.m. EDT (UTC-4) | Santos (yellow card) 26'; Cantore 40'; Hershfelt (yellow card) 58'; Kouassi 90+10' | Report | Petersen (yellow card) 32'; Bernal 53' (o.g.); DeMelo 80' (pen.); Hase (yellow card) 85'; Borges (yellow card) 90+6' | Stadium: Audi Field; Attendance: 11,691; Referee: John Matto (North Carolina) |

| August 23, 2025 17 | Bay FC | 2–3 | Washington Spirit | San Francisco, California |
| 1:00 p.m. PDT (UTC-7) | Kundananji 45+5' Hubly 54' | Report | Wiesner 7'; Bethune 39'; Hubly o.g. 45+2' | Stadium: Oracle Park; Referee: Jeremy Scheer (Connecticut) |

| August 31, 2025 18 | Washington Spirit | 1–1 | Chicago Stars FC | Washington, DC |
| 4:00 p.m. EDT (UTC-4) | Cantore 57' | Report | Ludmila 67' | Stadium: Audi Field; Attendance: 16,605; Referee: Marie Durr (Maryland) |

| September 7, 2025 19 | Washington Spirit | 2–0 | Seattle Reign | Washington, DC |
| 4:00 p.m. EDT (UTC-4) | Rodman 33' 81' | Report | | Stadium: Audi Field; Attendance: 12,668; Referee: JC Griggs (Virginia) |

| September 13, 2025 20 | Kansas City Current | 0–0 | Washington Spirit | Kansas City, Missouri |
| 6:30 p.m. CDT (UTC-5) | | Report | Hershfelt (yellow card) 21' (red card); Kouassi (yellow card) 79' | Stadium: CPKC Stadium; Attendance: 11,500; Referee: Thomas Snyder (New York) |

| September 18, 2025 21 | Angel City FC | 2–2 | Washington Spirit | Los Angeles, California |
| 7:30 p.m. PDT (UTC-7) | Shores 14'; Jónsdóttir (yellow card) 52'; McKeown 55' (o.g.); Gorden (yellow card) 84' | Report | Rodman 12'; Bethune 71' | Stadium: BMO Stadium; Attendance: 15,033; Referee: Calin Radosav (Illinois) |

| September 28, 2025 22 | Washington Spirit | 4–0 | Houston Dash | Washington, D.C. |
| 1:00 p.m. EDT (UTC-4) | Monday 18' 21' (yellow card) 30' (goal) 36'; Cantore 82' | Report | Ryan (yellow card) 45+2'; Alozie (yellow card) 50' | Stadium: Audi Field; Attendance: 12,715; Referee: Alex Billeter (Florida) |

| October 5, 2025 23 | Washington Spirit | 2–1 | San Diego Wave FC | Washington, D.C. |
| 1:00 p.m. EDT (UTC-4) | Kouassi 9', 90+8'; Abiodun (yellow card) 69' | Report | Robbe (yellow card) 38'; Lundkvist (yellow card) 62'; Cascarino (yellow card) 71', (goal) 90+5' | Stadium: Audi Field; Attendance: 17,422; Referee: Greg Dopka (Illinois) |

| October 11, 2025 24 | North Carolina Courage | 1–1 | Washington Spirit | Cary, North Carolina |
| 7:30 p.m. EDT (UTC-4) | Koyama 86' | Report | Rodman 52'; Abiodun (yellow card) 84' | Stadium: First Horizon Stadium at WakeMed Soccer Park; Attendance: 8,498; Referee: Servando Berna (California) |

| October 18, 2025 25 | Washington Spirit | 2–3 | Orlando Pride | Washington, DC |
| 12:30 p.m. EDT (UTC-4) | Abello (o.g.) Cantore 42' | Report | Abello 38' Miura (o.g.) Marta 72' | Stadium: Audi Field; Attendance: 17,038; Referee: Jeremy Scheer (Connecticut) |

| November 2, 2025 26 | Utah Royals | 1–0 | Washington Spirit | Sandy, Utah |
| 6:00 p.m. MDT (UTC-6) | Cronin 4' | Report | | Stadium: America First Field; Referee: Alex Billeter (Florida) |

==== Results by matchday ====
| Matchday | 1 | 2 | 3 | 4 | 5 | 6 | 7 | 8 | 9 | 10 | 11 | 12 | 13 | 14 | 15 | 16 | 17 | 18 | 19 | 20 | 21 | 22 | 23 | 24 | 25 | 26 |
|---|---|---|---|---|---|---|---|---|---|---|---|---|---|---|---|---|---|---|---|---|---|---|---|---|---|---|
| Stadium | A | H | H | A | A | H | H | A | H | A | H | A | A | H | A | H | A | H | H | A | A | H | H | A | H | A |
| Result | W | L | W | W | W | L | L | W | D | W | W | L | D | W | D | D | W | D | W | D | D | | | | | |
| Position | 3 | 6 | 3 | | | | | | | | | | | | | | | | | | 2 | | | | | |

Updated to match(es) played on March 29, 2025. Source: NWSL
A = Away; H = Home; W = Win; D = Draw; L = Loss

=== NWSL playoffs ===
==== Bracket ====
Quarterfinals
1 | Kansas City Current | 1
8 | Gotham FC (a.e.t.) | 2
4 | Orlando Pride | 2
5 | Seattle Reign FC | 0
2 | Washington Spirit (p) | 1 (3)
7 | Racing Louisville FC | 1 (1)
3 | Portland Thorns FC (a.e.t.) | 1
6 | San Diego Wave FC | 0

Semifinals
8 | Gotham FC | 1
4 | Orlando Pride | 0
2 | Washington Spirit | 2
3 | Portland Thorns FC | 0

Championship
8 | Gotham FC | 1
2 | Washington Spirit | 0

==== Results ====
| November 8, 2025 Quarterfinals | Washington Spirit | 1–1 (3–1 p) | Racing Louisville | Washington, D.C. |
| 12:00 pm EST | Monday 73' | Report | Fischer 90+2' | Stadium: Audi Field; Attendance: 19,215; Referee: Nabil Bensalah (Indiana) |
| | Penalties |
| | Bernal (penalty scored); Morgan (penalty scored); Hershfelt (penalty scored) | | (penalty scored) Balcer; (penalty missed) Jean; (penalty missed) DiGrande; (penalty missed) Borges |

| November 15, 2025 Semifinals | Washington Spirit | 2–0 | Portland Thorns | Washington, D.C. |
| 12:00 pm EST | Monday 27'; Bethune 83' | Report | | Stadium: Audi Field; Attendance: 19,365; Referee: Brad Jensen (Utah) |

Championship

November 22, 2025
5:00 PST

| Washington Spirit | 0–1 | Gotham FC |
|---|---|---|
| | Report | Lavelle 80' |

PayPal Park, San Jose, California
Attendance: 18,000
Referee: Natalie Simon (Florida)

=== 2025–26 CONCACAF W Champions Cup ===
==== Group B ====
| Pos | Team | Pld | W | D | L | GF | GA | GD | Pts | Qualification | WAS | GFC | MON | VNR | ALI |
|---|---|---|---|---|---|---|---|---|---|---|---|---|---|---|---|
| 1 | (United States) Washington Spirit | 4 | 3 | 1 | 0 | 15 | 0 | +15 | 10 | Advanced to knockout stage | — | — | 4–0 | 4–0 | — |
| 2 | (United States) Gotham FC | 4 | 3 | 1 | 0 | 8 | 2 | +6 | 10 | Advanced to knockout stage | 0–0 | — | 2–1 | — | — |
| 3 | (Mexico) Monterrey | 4 | 2 | 0 | 2 | 13 | 6 | +7 | 6 | | — | — | — | 4–0 | 8–0 |
| 4 | (Canada) Vancouver Rise Academy | 4 | 1 | 0 | 3 | 9 | 12 | −3 | 3 | | — | 1–4 | — | — | 8–0 |
| 5 | (El Salvador) Alianza | 4 | 0 | 0 | 4 | 0 | 25 | −25 | 0 | | 0–7 | 0–2 | — | — | — |

Source: CONCACAF
Rules for classification: Tiebreakers

===== Results =====
| August 19 Group Stage | Alianza (El Salvador) | 0–7 | (United States) Washington Spirit | Santa Tecla, El Salvador |
| 9:00 pm | | | Kouassi 21' (pen.), 52', 59'; Ricketts 24'; Ratcliffe 49'; Rodman 56'; Cantore 89' | Stadium: Estadio Las Delicias; Referee: Merlin Soto (Honduras) |

| September 3 Group Stage | Washington Spirit (United States) | 4–0 | (Canada) Vancouver Rise FC | Washington, D.C., United States |
| 7:00 pm | McKeown 31'; Stainbrook 41', (yellow card) 63'; Rodman 45'; Abiodun 81' | Report | | Stadium: Audi Field; Attendance: 1,191; Referee: Crystal Sobers (Trinidad and Tobago) |

| October 1 Group Stage | Gotham FC (United States) | 0–0 | (United States) Washington Spirit | Chester, United States |
| 7:00 pm | | Report | | Stadium: Subaru Park; Referee: Janeishka Caban (Puerto Rico) |

| October 15 Group Stage | Washington Spirit (United States) | 4–0 | (Mexico) Monterrey | Washington, D.C., United States |
| 6:15 pm | Bethune 6'; Kouassi 54'; Monday 57'; del Campo 67' (o.g.) | Report | Servín (yellow card) 61' | Stadium: Audi Field; Referee: Marianela Araya (Costa Rico) |

=== NWSL Challenge Cup ===
| April 7 | Orlando Pride | 1–1 (2–4 p) | Washington Spirit | Orlando, Florida |
| 8:00 pm EDT | Souza 41' | Report | Santos 72' | Stadium: Inter&Co Stadium; Attendance: 8,880; Referee: Alex Billeter |
| | Penalties |
| | Doyle (penalty scored); Angelina (penalty scored); Yates (penalty missed); Lemos (penalty missed) | | (penalty scored) Hatch; (penalty scored) Bernal; (penalty scored) Miura; (penalty scored) McKeown |

== Statistics ==
As of match played March 14, 2025

=== Appearances ===
Starting appearances are listed first, followed by substitute appearances after the + symbol where applicable.

| No. | Pos | Nat | Player | Total | | NWSL | | Challenge Cup | | Playoffs | |
| No. | Pos | Nat | Player | Apps | Goals | Apps | Goals | Apps | Goals | Apps | Goals |
Goalkeepers
| 1 | GK | (United States) USA | Aubrey Kingsbury | 2 | 0 | 1 | 0 | 1 | 0 | 0 | 0 |
| 18 | GK | (United States) USA | Lyza Jessee | 0 | 0 | 0 | 0 | 0 | 0 | 0 | 0 |
| 28 | GK | (Scotland) SCO | Sandy MacIver | 0 | 0 | 0 | 0 | 0 | 0 | 0 | 0 |
| 31 | GK | (United States) USA | Kaylie Collins | 0 | 0 | 0 | 0 | 0 | 0 | 0 | 0 |
Defenders
| 3 | DF | (United States) USA | Casey Krueger | 2 | 0 | 1 | 0 | 1 | 0 | 0 | 0 |
| 4 | DF | (Mexico) MEX | Rebeca Bernal | 2 | 0 | 1 | 0 | 0+1 | 0 | 0 | 0 |
| 6 | DF | (United States) USA | Kate Wiesner | 0 | 0 | 0 | 0 | 0 | 0 | 0 | 0 |
| 9 | DF | (United States) USA | Tara McKeown | 2 | 0 | 1 | 0 | 1 | 0 | 0 | 0 |
| 21 | DF | (Canada) CAN | Gabrielle Carle | 2 | 0 | 1 | 0 | 1 | 0 | 0 | 0 |
| 24 | DF | (England) ENG | Esme Morgan | 2 | 0 | 0+1 | 0 | 1 | 0 | 0 | 0 |
| 25 | DF | (France) FRA | Kysha Sylla | 0 | 0 | 0 | 0 | 0 | 0 | 0 | 0 |
| 26 | DF | (United States) USA | Paige Metayer | 0 | 0 | 0 | 0 | 0 | 0 | 0 | 0 |
| 34 | DF | (United States) USA | Kiley Dulaney | 0 | 0 | 0 | 0 | 0 | 0 | 0 | 0 |
Midfielders
| 5 | MF | (Japan) JPN | Narumi Miura | 2 | 0 | 1 | 0 | 1 | 0 | 0 | 0 |
| 7 | MF | (United States) USA | Croix Bethune | 0 | 0 | 0 | 0 | 0 | 0 | 0 | 0 |
| 10 | MF | (Colombia) COL | Leicy Santos | 2 | 1 | 1 | 0 | 1 | 1 | 0 | 0 |
| 12 | MF | (United States) USA | Andi Sullivan | 0 | 0 | 0 | 0 | 0 | 0 | 0 | 0 |
| 16 | MF | (United States) USA | Courtney Brown | 0 | 0 | 0 | 0 | 0 | 0 | 0 | 0 |
| 17 | MF | (United States) USA | Hal Hershfelt | 2 | 0 | 1 | 0 | 1 | 0 | 0 | 0 |
| 22 | MF | (United States) USA | Heather Stainbrook | 0 | 0 | 0 | 0 | 0 | 0 | 0 | 0 |
| 35 | MF | (United States) USA | Meg Boade | 1 | 0 | 0+1 | 0 | 0 | 0 | 0 | 0 |
| 39 | MF | (United States) USA | Chloe Ricketts | 2 | 0 | 1 | 0 | 1 | 0 | 0 | 0 |
Forwards
| 2 | FW | (United States) USA | Trinity Rodman | 1 | 0 | 0+1 | 0 | 0 | 0 | 0 | 0 |
| 8 | FW | (United States) USA | Makenna Morris | 2 | 1 | 1 | 1 | 0+1 | 0 | 0 | 0 |
| 11 | FW | (France) FRA | Ouleymata Sarr | 0 | 0 | 0 | 0 | 0 | 0 | 0 | 0 |
| 13 | FW | (United States) USA | Brittany Ratcliffe | 2 | 0 | 0+1 | 0 | 1 | 0 | 0 | 0 |
| 19 | FW | (Ivory Coast) CIV | Rosemonde Kouassi | 0 | 0 | 0 | 0 | 0 | 0 | 0 | 0 |
| 33 | FW | (United States) USA | Ashley Hatch | 2 | 1 | 1 | 1 | 1 | 0 | 0 | 0 |
| 36 | FW | (United States) USA | Margie Detrizio | 1 | 0 | 0+1 | 0 | 0 | 0 | 0 | 0 |
| — | FW | (United States) USA | Emma Gaines-Ramos | 0 | 0 | 0 | 0 | 0 | 0 | 0 | 0 |
Players away from the club on loan:
| — | MF | (Nigeria) NGR | Deborah Abiodun | 0 | 0 | 0 | 0 | 0 | 0 | 0 | 0 |
| — | FW | (Brazil) BRA | Tamara Bolt | 0 | 0 | 0 | 0 | 0 | 0 | 0 | 0 |
| — | DF | (Uganda) UGA | Shadia Nankya | 0 | 0 | 0 | 0 | 0 | 0 | 0 | 0 |

=== Goalscorers ===
| Rank | No. | Pos. | Nat. | Name | NWSL | Challenge Cup | Playoffs | Total |
|---|---|---|---|---|---|---|---|---|
| 1 | 33 | FW | (United States) | Ashley Hatch | 1 | 0 | 0 | 1 |
| 1 | 8 | FW | (United States) | Makenna Morris | 1 | 0 | 0 | 1 |
| 2 | 11 | MF | (Colombia) | Leicy Santos | 0 | 1 | 0 | 1 |
| Own goals | | | | | 0 | 0 | 0 | 0 |
| Total | | | | | 2 | 1 | 0 | 3 |

=== Disciplinary record ===
| No. | Pos. | Nat. | Name | NWSL | | | Challenge Cup | | | Playoffs | | | Total | | |
| No. | Pos. | Nat. | Name | Yellow card | (yellow card) (yellow-red card) | Red card | Yellow card | (yellow card) (yellow-red card) | Red card | Yellow card | (yellow card) (yellow-red card) | Red card | Yellow card | (yellow card) (yellow-red card) | Red card |
|---|---|---|---|---|---|---|---|---|---|---|---|---|---|---|---|
| 4 | DF | (Mexico) | Rebeca Bernal | 1 | 0 | 0 | 0 | 0 | 0 | 0 | 0 | 0 | 1 | 0 | 0 |
| 5 | MF | (Japan) | Narumi Miura | 0 | 0 | 0 | 1 | 0 | 0 | 0 | 0 | 0 | 1 | 0 | 0 |
| 9 | DF | (United States) | Tara McKeown | 0 | 0 | 0 | 1 | 0 | 0 | 0 | 0 | 0 | 1 | 0 | 0 |
| 21 | DF | (Canada) | Gabrielle Carle | 1 | 0 | 0 | 0 | 0 | 0 | 0 | 0 | 0 | 1 | 0 | 0 |
| Total | | | | 2 | 0 | 0 | 2 | 0 | 0 | 0 | 0 | 0 | 4 | 0 | 0 |

== Transactions ==
=== Contract operations ===
Contract options
| Date | Player | Pos. | Notes | Ref. |
|---|---|---|---|---|
| January 07, 2025 | (United States) Tara McKeown | DF | Exercised option for 2028 | |

Re-signings
| Date | Player | Pos. | Notes | Ref. |
|---|---|---|---|---|
| September 13, 2024 | (United States) Makenna Morris | FW | Resigned new contract through 2025 | |
| September 19, 2024 | (United States) Tara McKeown | DF | Resigned new contract through 2027 with 1 option year | |
| December 13, 2024 | (United States) Kaylie Collins | GK | Resigned new contract through 2025 | |

=== Loans in ===
| Date | Player | Pos. | Previous club | Fee/notes | Ref. |
|---|---|---|---|---|---|
| February 6, 2025 | (France) Kysha Sylla | DF | (France) Olympique Lyon | Loaned through the 2025 season. | |

=== Loans out ===
| Date | Player | Pos. | Destination club | Fee/notes | Ref. |
|---|---|---|---|---|---|
| February 7, 2025 | (Nigeria) Deborah Abiodun | MF | (United States) Dallas Trinity FC | Loaned through the end of the 2025 calendar year. | |
| February 7, 2025 | (Brazil) Tamara Bolt | FW | (United States) Dallas Trinity FC | Loaned through the end of the 2025 calendar year. | |
| March 8, 2025 | (Uganda) Shadia Nankya | DF | (United States) Dallas Trinity FC | Loaned through the end of the 2025 calendar year. | |

=== Transfers in ===
| Date | Player | Pos. | Previous club | Fee/notes | Ref. |
|---|---|---|---|---|---|
| December 17, 2024 | (Japan) Narumi Miura | MF | (United States) North Carolina Courage | Signed as free agent. | |
| January 6, 2025 | (United States) Emma Gaines-Ramos | FW | (United States) San Diego State Aztecs | Signed rookie contract, starting on season-ending injury (SEI) list, but eligible to play in 2025. | |
| January 6, 2025 | (Nigeria) Deborah Abiodun | MF | (United States) Pittsburgh Panthers | Signed rookie contract, will occupy international slot. | |
| January 9, 2025 | (Brazil) Tamara Bolt | FW | (Brazil) SC Internacional | Acquired in exchange for an undisclosed fee and signed to a one-year contract, with two option years. Will occupy an international slot. | |
| January 20, 2025 | (Scotland) Sandy MacIver | GK | (England) Manchester City | Acquired in exchange for an undisclosed fee and signed to a three-year contract, with one option year. Will occupy an international slot. | |
| February 13, 2025 | (Uganda) Shadia Nankya | DF | (Egypt) FC Masar | Acquired in exchange for an undisclosed fee and signed to a two-year contract, with two option years. Will occupy an international slot. | |
| February 25, 2025 | (Mexico) Rebeca Bernal | DF | (Mexico) C.F. Monterrey | Acquired in exchange for an undisclosed fee and signed to a three-year contract. Will occupy an international slot. | |
| March 5, 2025 | (United States) Meg Boade | MF | (United States) UCLA Bruins | Signed to short-term injury replacement contracts as rookies. | |
| March 5, 2025 | (United States) Margie Detrizio | FW | (United States) Georgia Bulldogs | Signed to short-term injury replacement contracts as rookies. | |
| March 5, 2025 | (United States) Kiley Dulaney | FW | (United States) Arkansas Razorbacks | Signed to short-term injury replacement contracts as rookies. | |
| March 25, 2025 | (Nigeria) Gift Monday | FW | (Spain) UD Tenerife | Acquired in exchange for an undisclosed fee and signed to a three-year contract with one option year. Will occupy an international slot. | |

=== Transfers out ===
| Date | Player | Pos. | Destination club | Fee/notes | Ref. |
|---|---|---|---|---|---|
| December 10, 2024 | (United States) Nicole Barnhart | GK | Retired | Out-of-contract, now full-time staff member | |
| December 10, 2024 | (France) Annaïg Butel | DF | (France) FC Fleury 91 | Out-of-contract | |
| December 10, 2024 | (United States) Jenna Butler | DF | (United States) Carolina Ascent | Out-of-contract | |
| December 10, 2024 | (United States) Anna Heilferty | DF | (United States) Tampa Bay Sun | Declined 2025 option | |
| December 10, 2024 | (United States) Civana Kuhlmann | FW | Retired | Declined 2025 option | |
| December 10, 2024 | (United States) Lena Silano | FW | (Spain) UD Tenerife | Declined 2025 option | |
| December 10, 2024 | (United States) Waniya Hudson | DF | (Sweden) Kristianstad | Declined 2025 option | |

=== Injury listings ===
| Date | Player | Pos. | List | Injury | Ref. |
|---|---|---|---|---|---|
| August 8, 2024 | (United States) Lyza Jessee | GK | Season-ending injury (SEI) | Wrist injury rehab | |
| October 9, 2024 | (United States) Andi Sullivan | MF | Season-ending injury (SEI) | Torn ACL suffered in October 6 match against Orlando Pride. | |
| November 27, 2024 | (France) Ouleye Sarr | FW | Season-ending injury (SEI) | Back injury suffered in September 7 home match against Portland Thorns. | |
| February, 2025 | (United States) Paige Metayer | FW | 45-day injury (D45) | Knee injury sustained during preaseason. | |

=== Preseason trialists ===
Trialists are non-rostered invitees during preseason and are not automatically signed. The Spirit released their preseason roster on February 19, 2025.

| Player | Pos. | Previous club | Status | Ref. |
|---|---|---|---|---|
| (United States) Lauren Gogal | DF | (United States) Virginia Tech Hokies | Not signed. | |
| (United States) Nylah Norris | DF | (United States) Florida Kraze Krush | U18; Not signed. | |
| (United States) Meg Boade | MF | (United States) UCLA Bruins | Signed to short-term contract. | |
| (United States) Abby Boyan | MF | (Iceland) Fylkir | Not signed. | |
| (United States) JuJu Harris | MF | (United States) Florida United | Not signed. | |
| (United States) Emily Morris | MF | (United States) Washington College Shorewomen | Not signed. | |
| (United States) Kiley Dulaney | FW | (United States) Arkansas Razorbacks | Signed to short-term contract. | |
| (United States) Meg Hughes | FW | (United States) Michigan State Spartans | Not signed. | |
