= 2025 NWSL rookie class =

First-year pros in US soccer

Overview
- League: National Women's Soccer League

The rookie class for the 2025 season of the National Women's Soccer League (NWSL) was the first since the abolition of the NWSL Draft. Instead of being selected in a draft, first-year professionals were able to sign with teams as free agents.

== List ==
=== Key ===
^{+}	Denotes player who has been selected as NWSL Most Valuable Player
^{*}	Denotes player who has been selected for an NWSL Best XI or NWSL Second XI team
^{^}	Denotes player who has been selected as NWSL Rookie of the Year
^{#}	Denotes player who has never appeared in a competitive NWSL game (regular season, playoff, or Challenge Cup)

=== Players ===
Date	Nat.	Player	Pos.	NWSL team	College	Ref.
Nov 7, 2024	(United States)	Trinity Byars	FW	San Diego Wave FC	Texas	
Dec 13, 2024	(United States)	Quincy McMahon	DF	San Diego Wave FC	UCLA	
Dec 19, 2024	(Canada)	Brooklyn Courtnall	DF	North Carolina Courage	USC	
Dec 23, 2024	(United States)	Sarah Schupansky	FW	Gotham FC	Pittsburgh	
Dec 23, 2024	(United States)	Macey Hodge	MF	Angel City FC	Mississippi State	
Dec 30, 2024	(United States)	Mia Justus	GK	Utah Royals	Texas	
Dec 30, 2024	(United States)	Karlie Lema	FW	Bay FC	California	
Jan 3, 2025	(United States)	Lilly Reale ^{*^}	DF	Gotham FC	UCLA	
Jan 6, 2025	(Nigeria)	Deborah Abiodun	MF	Washington Spirit	Pittsburgh	
Jan 6, 2025	(United States)	Emma Gaines-Ramos ^{#}	FW	Washington Spirit	San Diego State	
Jan 8, 2025	(United States)	Khyah Harper	FW	Gotham FC	Minnesota	
Jan 8, 2025	(United States)	Clare Gagne ^{#}	GK	Kansas City Current	North Carolina	
Jan 8, 2025	(United States)	Mary Long	FW	Kansas City Current	Duke	
Jan 8, 2025	(United States)	Katie Scott	DF	Kansas City Current	Penn State	
Jan 8, 2025	(United States)	Emily Mason	DF	Seattle Reign FC	Rutgers	
Jan 8, 2025	(United States)	Maddie Dahlien	FW	Seattle Reign FC	North Carolina	
Jan 8, 2025	(United States)	Pietra Tordin	FW	Portland Thorns FC	Princeton	
Jan 9, 2025	(United States)	Taylor Huff	MF	Bay FC	Florida State	
Jan 10, 2025	(United States)	Ryan Campbell	GK	Gotham FC	UCLA	
Jan 13, 2025	(Canada)	Zara Chavoshi	DF	Orlando Pride	Wake Forest	
Jan 15, 2025	(Japan)	Manaka Hayashi	MF	Chicago Stars FC	Santa Clara	
Jan 16, 2025	(United States)	Trinity Armstrong	DF	San Diego Wave FC	North Carolina	
Jan 16, 2025	(United States)	Ella Hase	DF	Racing Louisville FC	Duke	
Jan 17, 2025	(United States)	Sarah Weber	FW	Racing Louisville FC	Nebraska	
Jan 20, 2025	(United States)	Allie George ^{#}	DF	Racing Louisville FC	Virginia Tech	
Jan 21, 2025	(United States)	Maggie Graham	MF	Houston Dash	Duke	
Jan 22, 2025	(United States)	Jayden Perry	DF	Portland Thorns FC	UCLA	
Jan 29, 2025	(United States)	Sofia Cook	MF	Gotham FC	UCLA	
Feb 7, 2025	(United States)	Hannah Bebar	MF	Bay FC	Duke	
Feb 12, 2025	(United States)	DeAira Jackson ^{#}	GK	Orlando Pride	Grand Canyon	
Feb 12, 2025	(United States)	Aryssa Mahrt ^{#}	MF	Orlando Pride	Wisconsin	
Feb 16, 2025	(United States)	Carissa Boeckmann ^{#}	MF	Portland Thorns FC	Florida State	
Feb 21, 2025	(United States)	Katie O'Kane	MF	Racing Louisville FC	Utah	
Mar 3, 2025	(United States)	Riley Tiernan	FW	Angel City FC	Rutgers	
Mar 3, 2025	(United States)	Hannah Johnson	MF	Angel City FC	Mississippi State	
Mar 4, 2025	(United States)	Kayla Colbert ^{#}	DF	Utah Royals	USC	
Mar 4, 2025	(United States)	Sydney Jones	DF	Utah Royals	Ohio State	
Mar 4, 2025	(United States)	Aria Nagai	MF	Utah Royals	North Carolina	
Mar 5, 2025	(United States)	Meg Boade	MF	Washington Spirit	UCLA	
Mar 5, 2025	(United States)	Margie Detrizio	FW	Washington Spirit	Georgia	
Mar 5, 2025	(United States)	Kiley Dulaney	FW	Washington Spirit	Arkansas	
Mar 6, 2025	(United States)	Maddie Prohaska	GK	Seattle Reign FC	Auburn	
Mar 11, 2025	(United States)	Liz Beardsley ^{#}	GK	Houston Dash	Maryland	
Mar 12, 2025	(United States)	Caiya Hanks	FW	Portland Thorns FC	Wake Forest	
Mar 12, 2025	(United States)	Justina Gaynor	DF	Chicago Stars FC	Michigan State	
Mar 12, 2025	(United States)	Maddy Anderson ^{#}	GK	Racing Louisville FC	Mississippi State	
Mar 12, 2025	(United States)	Breanna Norris ^{#}	GK	Angel City FC	Portland	
Mar 12, 2025	(United States)	Nya Harrison	DF	San Diego Wave FC	Stanford	
Mar 12, 2025	(United States)	Jordan Fusco	MF	San Diego Wave FC	Penn State	
Mar 13, 2025	(United States)	Catherine Barry	FW	Chicago Stars FC	South Carolina	
Mar 14, 2025	(United States)	Moira Kelley ^{#}	DF	Portland Thorns FC	Virginia	
Mar 21, 2025	(United States)	Heather MacNab	FW	North Carolina Courage	Princeton	
Mar 21, 2025	(United States)	Avery Kalitta	MF	Racing Louisville FC	Michigan	
Mar 22, 2025	(United States)	Amber Nguyen ^{#}	MF	North Carolina Courage	Georgia	
Apr 12, 2025	(United States)	Emerson Elgin	DF	Gotham FC	North Carolina	
Apr 17, 2025	(United States)	Tyler McCamey ^{#}	GK	Gotham FC	Princeton	
May 16, 2025	(United States)	Sophia Mattice	DF	Angel City FC	Kentucky	
May 19, 2025	(United States)	Haley Craig ^{#}	GK	Portland Thorns FC	Stanford	
May 22, 2025	(United States)	Katie Cappelletti ^{#}	GK	North Carolina Courage	Saint Joseph's	
May 29, 2025	(United States)	Simone Jackson	FW	Orlando Pride	USC	
Jun 3, 2025	(United States)	Stephanie Sparkowski ^{#}	GK	Chicago Stars FC	Michigan	
Jun 10, 2025	(Denmark)	Josefine Hasbo	MF	Gotham FC	Harvard	
Jun 12, 2025	(United States)	Ellie Ospeck ^{#}	FW	Houston Dash	Notre Dame	
Jul 8, 2025	(United States)	Ashlyn Miller ^{#}	MF	San Diego Wave FC	Texas	
Jul 10, 2025	(United States)	Evelyn Shores	DF	Angel City FC	North Carolina	
Jul 11, 2025	(United States)	Grace Gordon ^{#}	GK	Kansas City Current	Oklahoma State	
Jul 14, 2025	(United States)	Kayla Duran	DF	Gotham FC	USC	
Jul 23, 2025	(United States)	Lauren Gogal ^{#}	DF	Washington Spirit	Virginia Tech	
Aug 23, 2025	(United States)	Nadia Cooper ^{#}	GK	Houston Dash	Washington State	
Sep 12, 2025	(United States)	Oli Peña ^{#}	MF	North Carolina Courage	TCU	

== See also ==
- NWSL Draft
- 2025 National Women's Soccer League season
