= Hal Hershfelt =

American soccer player (born 2001)

- Hershfelt with the Washington Spirit in 2025

Personal information
- Full name: Katherine Hailey Hershfelt
- Date of birth: October 3, 2001 (age 25)
- Place of birth: San Diego, California, U.S.
- Height: 5 ft 8 in (1.73 m)
- Position: Defensive midfielder

Team information
- Current team: Washington Spirit
- Number: 17

Youth career
- Concorde Fire

College career
| Years | Team | Apps | (Gls) |
| 2019–2023 | Clemson Tigers | 99 | (16) |

Senior career*
| Years | Team | Apps | (Gls) |
| 2022 | Greenville Liberty | 7 | (1) |
| 2023 | Indy Eleven | 8 | (1) |
| 2024– | Washington Spirit | 72 | (3) |

International career^{‡}
| 2024– | United States | 5 | (0) |
- * Club domestic league appearances and goals as of October 25, 2026 ‡ National team caps and goals as of January 27, 2026

Katherine Hailey Hershfelt (born October 3, 2001) is an American professional soccer player who plays as a defensive midfielder for the Washington Spirit of the National Women's Soccer League (NWSL) and the United States national team. She played college soccer for the Clemson Tigers and was selected fifth overall by the Spirit in the 2024 NWSL Draft. She earned second-team NWSL Best XI honors as a rookie and helped the Spirit to NWSL Championship appearances in both of her first two seasons. She was included as an alternate for the United States squad that won gold at the 2024 Paris Olympics.

== Early life ==
Hershfelt was born in San Diego, California, in a military family, and has a younger brother. Her family moved often, living in many states across the South, but she calls Hattiesburg, Mississippi, her hometown. During high school, she moved to Georgia to play for the Concorde Fire, reaching the ECNL semifinals in 2017. Shortly after the move, she tore the anterior cruciate ligament (ACL) and meniscus in her knee, injuries that limited her recruiting before she committed to Clemson as a sophomore. She graduated from Lassiter High School in Marietta, Georgia.

== College career ==
Hershfelt was an immediate starter for the Clemson Tigers as a freshman in 2019, playing in all 20 games and scoring 3 goals while being named to the Atlantic Coast Conference (ACC) all-freshman team. She started 17 games and scored 2 goals as a sophomore in 2020, earning third-team All-ACC honors and helping the Tigers to the NCAA tournament quarterfinals delayed to the spring due to the COVID-19 pandemic. She started all 20 games and scored a career-high 7 goals in her junior year in 2021, receiving a second-team All-ACC selection. She was again named second-team All-ACC in her senior year after starting all 18 games and scoring 3 goals in 2022. She returned for her fifth and final season as a graduate student in 2023, starting all but one match and scoring 1 goal in 24 appearances. That year, she was named first-team All-ACC after leading the Tigers to the ACC tournament final and the first NCAA tournament semifinal appearance in program history. She left Clemson as the program record holder for career starts (97). During college, she also played in the USL W League for Greenville Liberty and the 2023 champions Indy Eleven.

== Club career ==
The Washington Spirit selected Hershfelt with the fifth overall pick in the 2024 NWSL Draft. The pick was acquired from the North Carolina Courage (along with US$250,000 in allocation money) in a draft night trade for Ashley Sanchez. She was signed to a three-year contract. She made her professional debut on March 17, starting the entire match in a season-opening 1–0 loss to the Seattle Reign. The following week, she scored her first professional goal in a 2–1 win over expansion team Bay FC. Her strong early performances saw the rookie called up to the national team for the first time. She finished the season leading all rookies with over 2,000 minutes played, helping the Spirit place second in the league standings. In the playoff semifinals, she scored the 1–1 equalizer against NJ/NY Gotham FC in stoppage time, heading in Makenna Morris's free kick, as the Spirit advanced to the final on penalties. She played the entire match in the NWSL Championship, losing 1–0 to the Orlando Pride. She was named to the NWSL Best XI Second Team at the end of the season.

Hershfelt began the next season in the NWSL Challenge Cup against the Orlando Pride, winning her first professional trophy 4–2 on penalties after a 1–1 draw. The following week, on March 14, 2025, she sprained her ankle during the season opener against the Houston Dash and missed two months with the injury. On September 14, she was shown her first career red card for committing two bookable offenses in a 0–0 draw with the Kansas City Current. In the playoff quarterfinals against Racing Louisville, she converted her penalty in the 3–1 shootout win after a 1–1 draw in extra time. Washington advanced to their second consecutive NWSL Championship, losing 1–0 this time to Gotham FC. She injured her leg in the final colliding with Rose Lavelle but returned several minutes later, though with limited capacity, and was unable to stop Lavelle scoring the game-winner. She was subbed out after the goal, but head coach Adrián González later said that he should have subbed her out earlier.

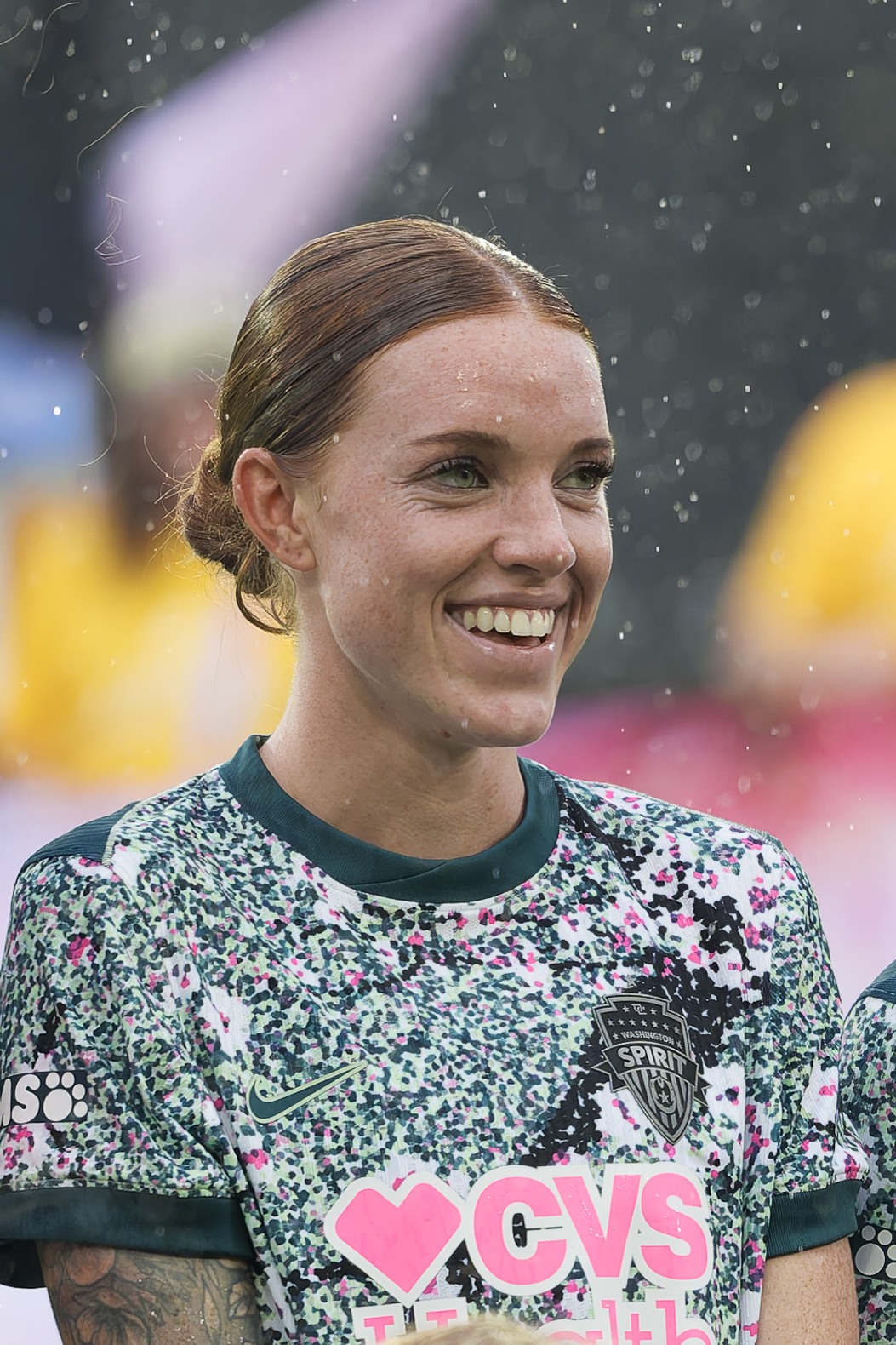
Hershfelt with the Washington Spirit in 2026

On May 24, 2026, Hershfelt played the full match in the CONCACAF W Champions Cup final, setting up Sofia Cantore's goal in the 5–3 defeat to Club América. The following week, she scored her first goal of the NWSL season with the 2–1 winner over the Seattle Reign. On October 25, she suffered an ACL tear during a 2–1 loss to the Kansas City Current, ending her season. She played more than 2,500 minutes in all competitions during the season.

== International career ==
Hershfelt was called into training camp with the United States national team in June 2024, her first national team call-up at any level. Later that month she was named as an alternate to the national team for the 2024 Summer Olympics in France. The United States won the gold medal, defeating Brazil 1–0 in the final on a goal from Mallory Swanson; however, Hershfelt did not receive a medal as an alternate.

Hershfelt made her debut for the United States in a 3–1 friendly victory over Iceland on October 24, 2024, replacing midfielder Sam Coffey in the 72nd minute.

== Style of play ==
A defensive midfielder, Hershfelt is known for her ability to disrupt play with good anticipation, smart positioning to make interceptions, and hard tackling.

== Career statistics ==
=== Club ===
As of May 23, 2025

Appearances and goals by club, season and competition
| Club | Season | League | | | Cup (Note: Includes the NWSL Challenge Cup) | | Playoffs (Note: Includes NWSL Playoffs) | | Total | | Ref. |
| Club | Season | Division | Apps | Goals | Apps | Goals | Apps | Goals | Apps | Goals | Ref. |
|---|---|---|---|---|---|---|---|---|---|---|---|
| Greenville Liberty | 2022 | USL W League | 7 | 1 | — | | — | | 7 | 1 | |
| Indy Eleven | 2023 | USL W League | 8 | 1 | — | | — | | 8 | 1 | |
| Washington Spirit | 2024 | NWSL | 25 | 2 | — | | 2 | 1 | 27 | 3 | |
| Washington Spirit | 2025 | NWSL | 3 | 0 | 1 | 0 | — | | 4 | 0 | |
| Career total | | | 43 | 4 | 1 | 0 | 2 | 1 | 46 | 5 | |

=== International ===
As of match played January 27, 2026

| National Team | Year | Apps | Goals |
|---|---|---|---|
| United States | 2024 | 3 | 0 |
| United States | 2025 | 0 | 0 |
| United States | 2026 | 2 | 0 |
| Total | | 5 | 0 |

== Honors and awards ==
Indy Eleven

- USL W League: 2023

Washington Spirit

- NWSL Challenge Cup: 2025

Individual

- NWSL Best XI Second Team: 2024
- First-team All-ACC: 2023
- Second-team All-ACC: 2021, 2022
- Third-team All-ACC: 2020
- ACC all-freshman team: 2019
- NCAA tournament all-tournament team: 2023
