= Makenna Morris =

American soccer player (born 2002)

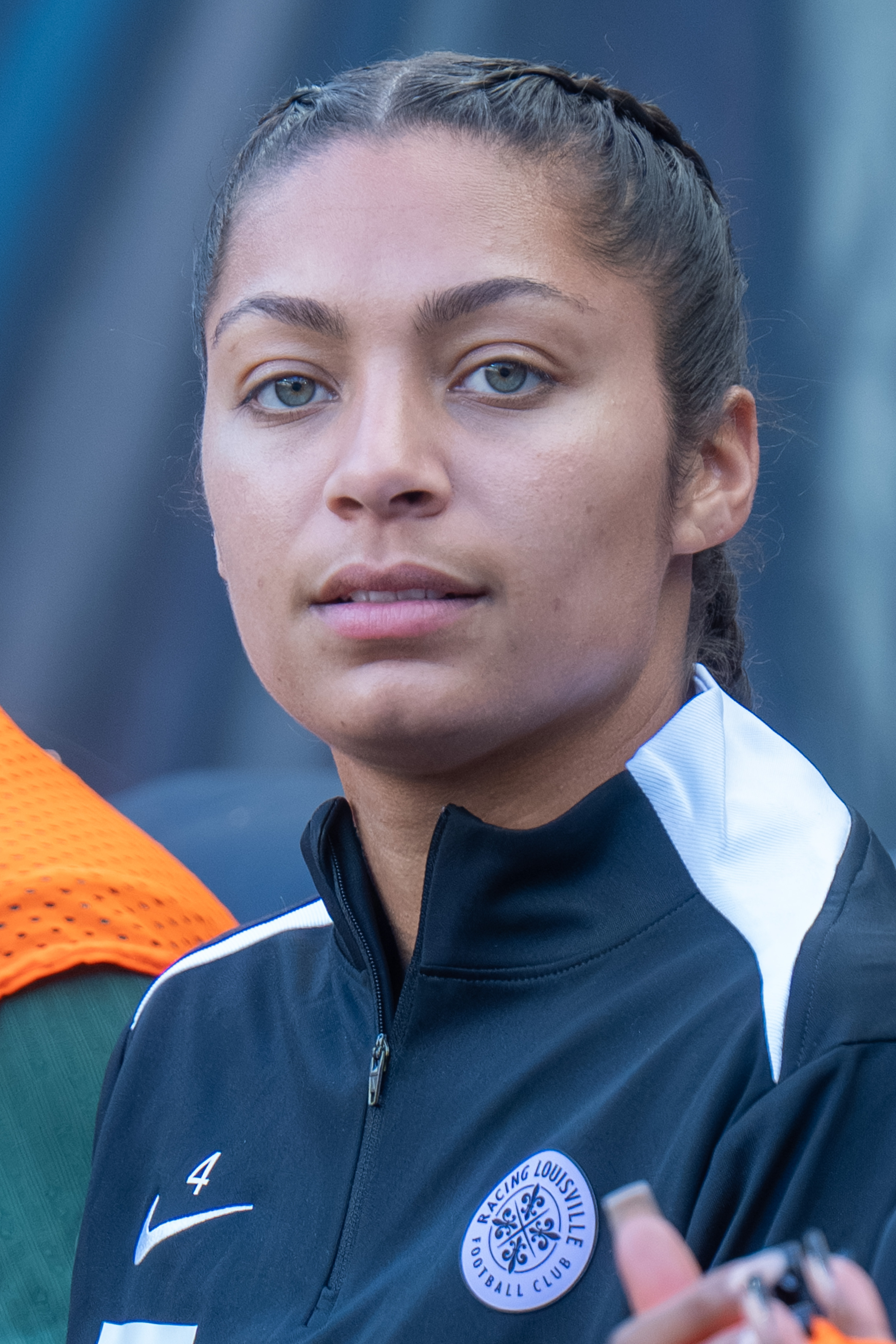
- Morris with Racing Louisville in 2026

Personal information
- Full name: Makenna Taylor Morris
- Date of birth: April 26, 2002 (age 24)
- Height: 5 ft 5 in (1.65 m)
- Positions: Fullback; midfielder; winger

Team information
- Current team: Racing Louisville
- Number: 4

College career
Years	Team	Apps	(Gls)
2020–2023	Clemson Tigers	80	(19)

Senior career*
Years	Team	Apps	(Gls)
2024–2025	Washington Spirit	28	(6)
2025–	Racing Louisville	29	(1)

International career^{‡}
2017–2018	United States U-17	19	(3)
2019–2022	United States U-20	7	(1)
2025–	United States U-23	1	(0)
- * Club domestic league appearances and goals as of 06:05, November 2, 2026 (UTC) ‡ National team caps and goals as of June 28, 2022

Makenna Taylor Morris (born April 26, 2002) is an American professional soccer player who plays for Racing Louisville FC of the National Women's Soccer League (NWSL). A versatile player, she can play as a fullback, midfielder, or winger. Morris played college soccer for the Clemson Tigers and was selected by the Washington Spirit in the first round of the 2024 NWSL Draft.

== Early life ==
Morris grew up in Germantown, Maryland. She has a sister, Maliah, who played with her at Clemson. The sisters grew up as fans of local NWSL club Washington Spirit, which played at Maryland SoccerPlex at the time. She played youth soccer for ECNL club Bethesda and played in high school for St. John's College High School.

== College career ==
Morris was a four-year starter for the Clemson Tigers, making 80 appearances and scoring 19 goals from 2020 to 2023. She converted penalty kicks in two NCAA tournament shootout wins in her freshman season, helping Clemson to the quarterfinals. She recorded six goals and a career-high nine assists as a sophomore. Though listed on the roster as a defender, she operated in her roles of outside back or box-to-box midfielder as one of the team's top contributors to the attack, especially in her senior year when she paced the team with ten goals and six assists. She scored two of her goals in the NCAA tournament, helping lead the team to the national semifinals.

== Club career ==
=== Washington Spirit ===
Morris was drafted by the Washington Spirit with the 13th overall pick in the first round of the 2024 NWSL Draft. She was signed to a one-year contract. She made her professional debut on the opening matchday on March 17, coming on for Brittany Ratcliffe and playing 26 minutes in the loss to the Seattle Reign. She then missed several months due to injury. On July 6, she made her first start and was involved in all three goals as Washington won 3–0 over Bay FC: scoring her first professional goal, drawing a penalty converted by Trinity Rodman, and assisting Ouleye Sarr. She was the first Spirit player to score a goal, assist a goal, and draw a penalty in a single game. On September 17, the Spirit extended her contract through the following season.

On October 13, 2024, she scored her first NWSL brace in a 4–1 win over Racing Louisville. She was named the NWSL Rookie of the Month for October/November with three goals and an assist in four games. She finished her rookie regular season with 5 goals in just 12 appearances as the Spirit placed second in the standings. In the playoffs, she assisted former college teammate Hal Hershfelt's late equalizing goal from a stoppage-time free kick, drawing 1–1 against NJ/NY Gotham FC; the Spirit advanced to the final on penalties. Morris started in the 2024 NWSL Championship against the Orlando Pride, losing 1–0.

=== Racing Louisville ===
On August 27, 2025, the Spirit traded Morris to Racing Louisville FC in exchange for $115,000 in allocation money.

== International career ==
Morris played with the United States youth national team at the under-15, under-17, and under-20 levels. She was called up by Emma Hayes into Futures Camp, practicing alongside the senior national team, in January 2025.

== Honors and awards ==
Washington Spirit

- NWSL Challenge Cup: 2025

Individual

- Second-team All-American: 2023
- All-ACC: 2023 (first team), 2020 (second team), 2021 (third team)
