= Tess Boade =

American soccer player (born 1999)

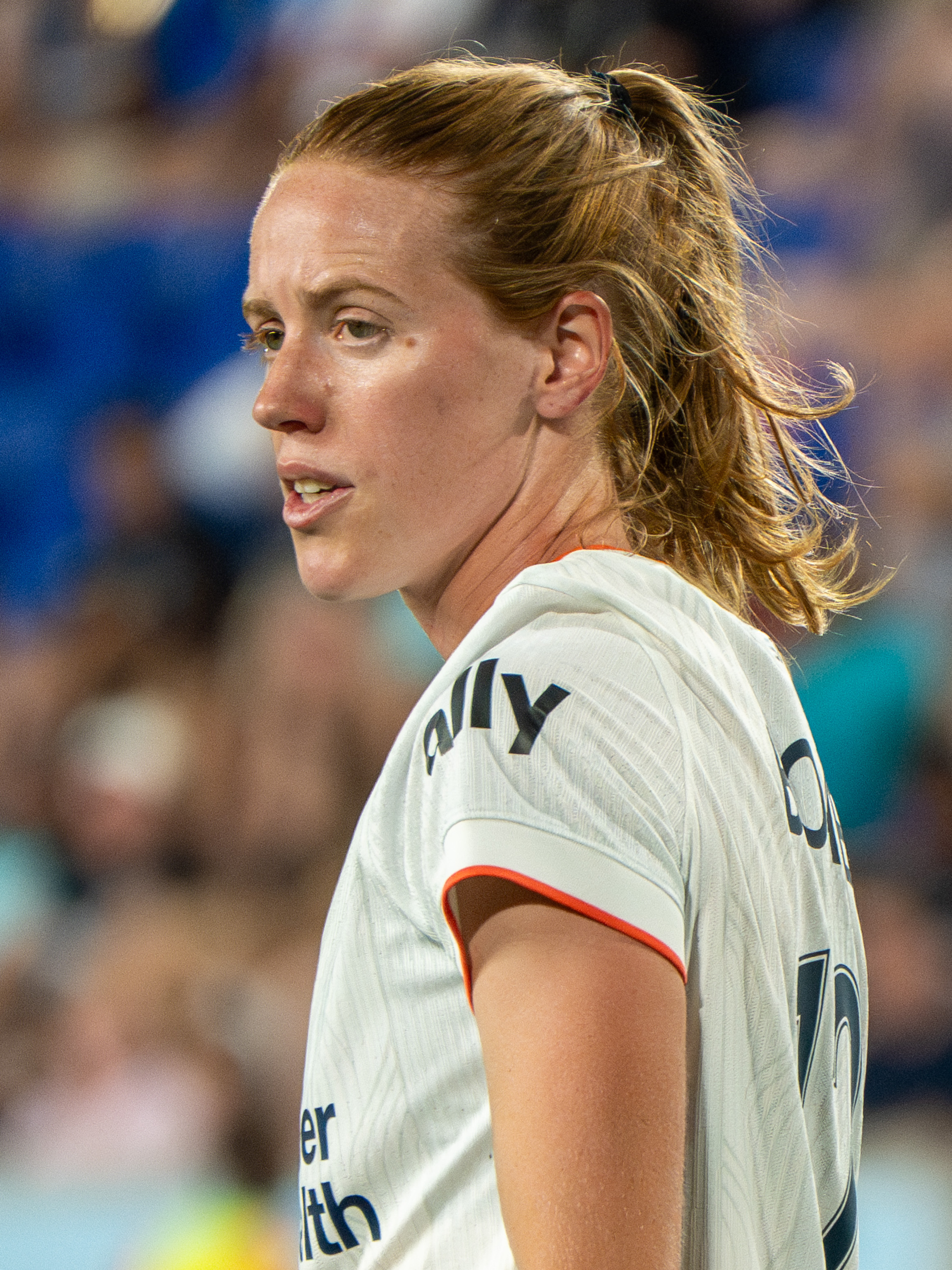
- Boade with Bay FC in 2025

Personal information
- Full name: Theresa Stephanie Boade
- Date of birth: February 3, 1999 (age 27)
- Place of birth: Dallas, Texas, U.S.
- Height: 5 ft 4 in (1.63 m)
- Position: Midfielder

Team information
- Current team: Gotham FC
- Number: 28

Youth career
- 2011–2015: Colorado Rush
- 2015–2016: Real Colorado

College career
| Years | Team | Apps | (Gls) |
| 2017–2021 | Duke Blue Devils | 93 | (22) |

Senior career*
| Years | Team | Apps | (Gls) |
| 2021 | NJ/NY Gotham FC | 0 | (0) |
| 2022–2023 | North Carolina Courage | 17 | (3) |
| 2022 | → Western Sydney Wanderers (loan) | 2 | (0) |
| 2024–2026 | Bay FC | 46 | (3) |
| 2026– | Gotham FC | 3 | (0) |

International career
| 2014 | United States U17 | | |
- * Club domestic league appearances and goals as of November 1, 2026

Theresa Stephanie Boade (born February 3, 1999) is an American professional soccer player who plays as a midfielder for Gotham FC of the National Women's Soccer League (NWSL). She played college soccer for the Duke Blue Devils. She has previously been a member of the North Carolina Courage and Bay FC.

== Early life ==
Boade was born in Dallas, Texas before moving to Golden, Colorado where she grew up. Her sister, Meg Boade, plays professionally for the Denver Summit. For high school she attended Valor Christian, where she competed in basketball, soccer and track. She played collegiately for the Duke Blue Devils, where she led the team to NCAA appearances in each of her 5 years, including her COVID year.

== Club career ==
=== North Carolina Courage ===
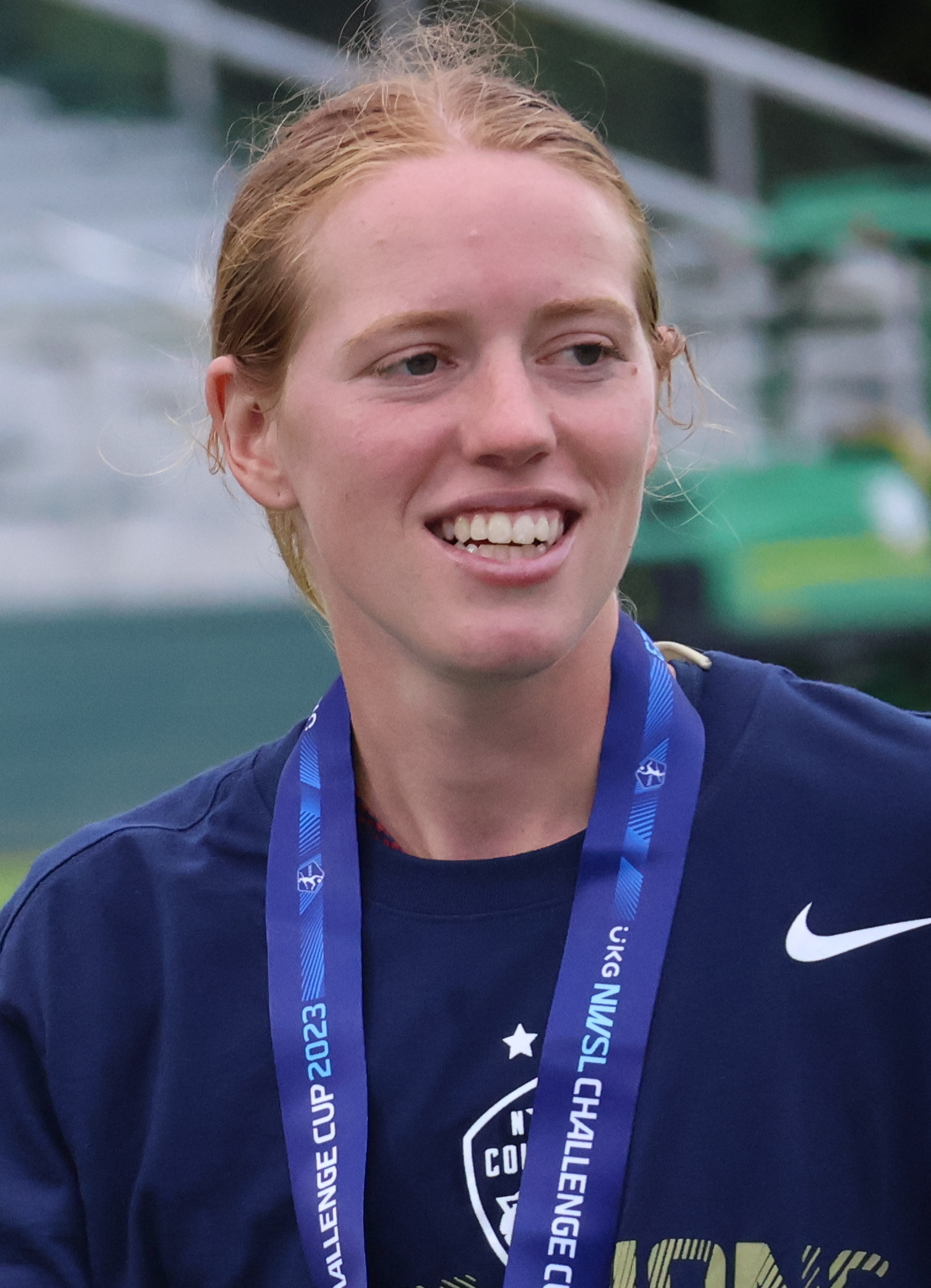
Boade with the North Carolina Courage at the 2023 NWSL Challenge Cup Final

Boade signed a two-year contract with the Courage on March 18, 2022. She then made her professional debut with the team the next day during a NWSL Challenge Cup match against the NJ/NY Gotham FC.

In November 2022, Boade joined Australian A-League Women club Western Sydney Wanderers on loan. Her loan was originally scheduled until February 2023, however a month later it ended early due to a shoulder injury she suffered during the Sydney Derby.

After surgery and rehab, Boade returned from injury on June 10, 2023 against the Chicago Red Stars where she started and recorded an assist in the 5–0 victory. She then started the remaining 13 regular season and playoff games for the North Carolina Courage as well as starting in the Semi-Finals and Finals of the NWSL Challenge Cup which was won by the Courage for the 2nd consecutive year.

=== Bay FC ===
In December 2023 she was drafted 3rd overall in the 2024 NWSL Expansion Draft by Bay FC. Boade wore the captain armband in Bay FC’s first ever home win on April 14, 2024. She scored the game winning goal in the 1–0 home victory against Angel City.

Boade was named captain of the 2025 Bay FC team, alongside Abby Dahlkemper. Early in the 2025 season, Boade competed against her sister, Meg Boade, when they played against the Washington Spirit. Prior to the match, Tess Boade conducted an interview with her sister. In the following game, Boade suffered a dirty tackle which sidelined her for several months.

On August 19, 2026, Boade departed from Bay FC on a mutual contract termination. She had made over 40 league appearances for the club across two-and-a-half years.

=== Gotham FC ===
The day after her contract with Bay FC was terminated, Boade was announced to have returned to her former club Gotham FC through the end of 2026.

== International career ==
In August 2014, Boade was named to the United States national under-17 team roster for friendly matches against South Korea.

== Honors ==
North Carolina Courage

- NWSL Challenge Cup: 2022, 2023

Gotham FC

- NWSL Shield: 2026

Individual

- First-team All-ACC: 2021
