= Kiley Dulaney =

American soccer player (born 2002)

Personal information
- Date of birth: June 24, 2002 (age 24)
- Height: 5 ft 9 in (1.75 m)
- Positions: Defender; forward

Team information
- Current team: Sydney FC
- Number: 11

Youth career
- Real Arkansas
- Oklahoma Energy

College career
Years	Team	Apps	(Gls)
2020–2024	Arkansas Razorbacks	78	(9)

Senior career*
Years	Team	Apps	(Gls)
2022	Asheville City SC	8	(4)
2025	Washington Spirit	1	(0)
2025–2026	Dallas Trinity	16	(0)
2026–	Sydney FC	0	(0)
- * Club domestic league appearances and goals as of 05:15, May 26, 2026 (UTC)

Kiley Dulaney (born June 24, 2002) is an American professional soccer player who plays as a defender or forward for A-League Women club Sydney FC. She played college soccer for the Arkansas Razorbacks before starting her professional career with the Washington Spirit of the National Women's Soccer League (NWSL) and USL Super League club Dallas Trinity FC.

== Early life ==
A native of Jacksonville, Arkansas, Dulaney started playing soccer at the age of 9. She played club soccer with Real Arkansas and Oklahoma Energy FC, advancing to the National Premier League Finals with Real Arkansas. Dulaney played two years of soccer with Cabot High School, where she was a Top 5 conference player in terms of points and goals in both years. She was homeschooled as a high school junior before playing one more year of high school soccer at the Jacksonville High.

== College career ==
Dulaney was signed by the Arkansas Razorbacks ahead of the 2020 college season, but due to the COVID-19 pandemic, play did not start until 2021. Dulaney kicked off her college career by playing in 12 freshman matches and registering 2 assists, both of which occurred in a game against Missouri State on February 23, 2021. She doubled her appearances the following season, playing in all 24 of Arkansas' matches, including all 4 NCAA tournament games.

In the offseason before her junior year at Arkansas, Dulaney played for Asheville City SC in the pre-professional USL W League. In her 8 games of action, Dulaney scored 4 times, including an 89th minute game-tying goal against the Charlotte Independence. Asheville City finished 5th in the South Atlantic Division and did not move on to the playoffs.

Dulaney missed her junior year of college due to injury. In her first game back in action, she scored a goal to help the Razorbacks earn a season-opening victory over Arkansas State. She repeated a similar feat the following year, scoring in Arkansas' 2024 season opener as well. She was named to the SEC Second Team after her fifth year, her first such honor as a Razorback. Dulaney also finished her college career as a two-time SEC Fall Academic Honor Roll honoree and a two-time SEC Preseason Watchlist member.

== Club career ==
=== Washington Spirit ===
Following the conclusion of her collegiate career, Dulaney trained with the Washington Spirit as a non-roster invitee in the 2025 NWSL preseason. On March 5, 2025, she signed a short-term contract with the Spirit. Three days later, she was an unused substitute as the Spirit claimed the 2025 NWSL Challenge Cup with a win over the Orlando Pride. Dulaney made her professional debut on May 24, coming into a match versus the Seattle Reign as a second-half substitute for Casey Krueger. She did not make any further appearances for the Spirit before her contract expired on June 25.

=== Dallas Trinity ===
Dallas Trinity FC of the USL Super League signed Dulaney ahead of its second full season of play. On August 23, 2025, Dulaney made her Dallas debut in the club's season-opening victory over Spokane Zephyr FC. The following week, she recorded her first professional start against Brooklyn FC. It would prove to be Dulaney's sole start of the season as she went on to come off the bench in all 16 of her subsequent appearances for the Trinity. She was also called on to participate in Dallas' semifinal defeat to Players' Shield winners Lexington SC on May 24, 2026. On June 4, 2026, the Trinity announced that Dulaney would be departing from the club at the end of the season.

=== Sydney FC ===
On September 3, 2026, Dulaney was announced to have signed for Australian club Sydney FC.

== Career statistics ==
=== Club ===
As of May 26, 2026

Appearances and goals by club, season and competition
Club	Season	League			Cup (Note: Includes the NWSL Challenge Cup)		Playoffs (Note: Includes USL Super League playoffs)		Total	
Club	Season	Division	Apps	Goals	Apps	Goals	Apps	Goals	Apps	Goals
Asheville City SC	2022	USL W League	8	4	—		—		8	4
Washington Spirit	2025	NWSL	1	0	0	0	—		1	0
Dallas Trinity FC	2025–26	USL Super League	16	0	—		1	0	17	0
Career total			25	4	0	0	1	0	26	4

== Honors ==
Washington Spirit

- NWSL Challenge Cup: 2025
