= Kysha Sylla =

French footballer (born 2004)

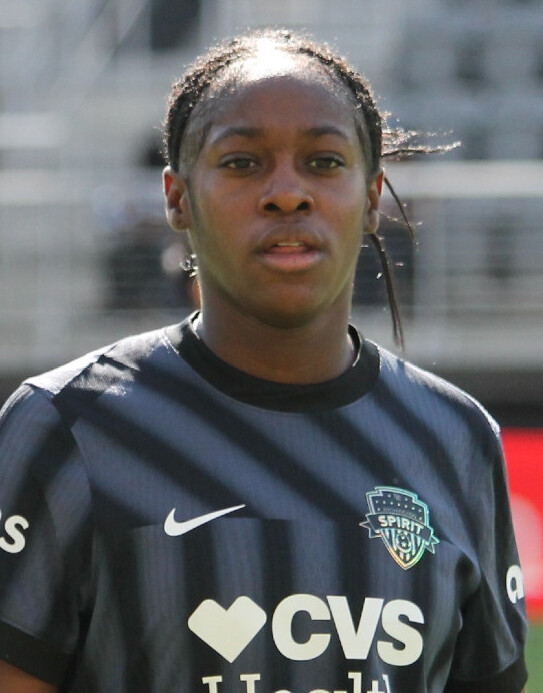
- Sylla with the Washington Spirit in 2025

Personal information
- Full name: Kysha Emilie Zéna Laurence Sylla
- Date of birth: 2 February 2004 (age 22)
- Height: 1.73 m (5 ft 8 in)
- Position: Center back

Team information
- Current team: Juventus
- Number: 4

Senior career*
Years	Team	Apps	(Gls)
2021–2026	OL Lyonnes	11	(0)
2022–2023	→ Dijon (loan)	8	(0)
2025	→ Washington Spirit (loan)	14	(0)
2026	→ Paris FC (loan)	5	(0)
2026–	Juventus	0	(0)

International career^{‡}
2022–2023	France U19	12	(1)
2022	France U20	6	(0)
2024	France U23	1	(0)
- * Club domestic league appearances and goals as of 05:19, 13 June 2026 (UTC) ‡ National team caps and goals as of 28 November 2024

Kysha Emilie Zéna Laurence Sylla (born 2 February 2004) is a French professional footballer who plays as a center back for Serie A club Juventus.

== Club career ==
Sylla grew up in Martigues, outside of Marseille, and began playing football with boys at CA Croix Sainte at age 10. Originally a defensive midfielder, she later trained at Martigues and Marseille, before joining Lyon's academy in 2019. On 8 October 2021, she signed her first professional contract with Lyon, signing a three-year deal. She helped Lyon win the national under-19 championship in 2022.

On 17 January 2023, Sylla went on loan to Dijon for the rest of the 2022–23 season. She made nine appearances for Dijon in all competitions, starting seven of them.

Sylla made her first league start for Lyon on 3 March 2024, playing the first half of their 3–1 win against Dijon. She totaled five appearances in the 2023–24 season, including three starts, after which she extended her contract with the club to 2026.

On 6 February 2025, Sylla joined National Women's Soccer League team Washington Spirit (like Lyon, owned by Michele Kang) on loan for the 2025 season, while re-signing her contract to 2027. She made her NWSL debut on 28 March 2025, coming on as a stoppage-time substitute for Narumi Miura in a 2–0 victory over Bay FC. On 29 August 2025, she made her first start for the Spirit in the club's continental debut, a 7–0 away win over Salvadoran club Alianza in the CONCACAF W Champions Cup group stage. In the playoff quarterfinals, she replaced an injured Tara McKeown in extra time against Racing Louisville, then was unused the rest of the playoffs as the Spirit reached the 2025 NWSL Championship, losing to Gotham FC. She made 18 appearances, starting 5, in all competitions during the loan.

On 2 January 2026, Sylla went out on loan again to Paris FC for the rest of the season.

On 15 July 2026, Sylla joined Italian club Juventus on a permanent transfer, signing a three-year contract. She scored her first UEFA Women's Champions League goal against FK Austria Wien on 29 October 2026.

== International career ==
Sylla played for France U-20 at the 2022 FIFA U-20 Women's World Cup, starting in their quarterfinal match against eventual finalists Japan.

== Honors ==
OL Lyonnes

- Première Ligue: 2021–22, 2022–23, 2023–24
- UEFA Women's Champions League: 2021–22
- Trophée des Championnes: 2022
- Women's International Champions Cup: 2022
- Coupe de France Féminine: 2022–23

Washington Spirit

- NWSL Challenge Cup: 2025

Juventus

- Serie A Women's Cup: 2026
