= Trinity Rodman =

American soccer player (born 2002)

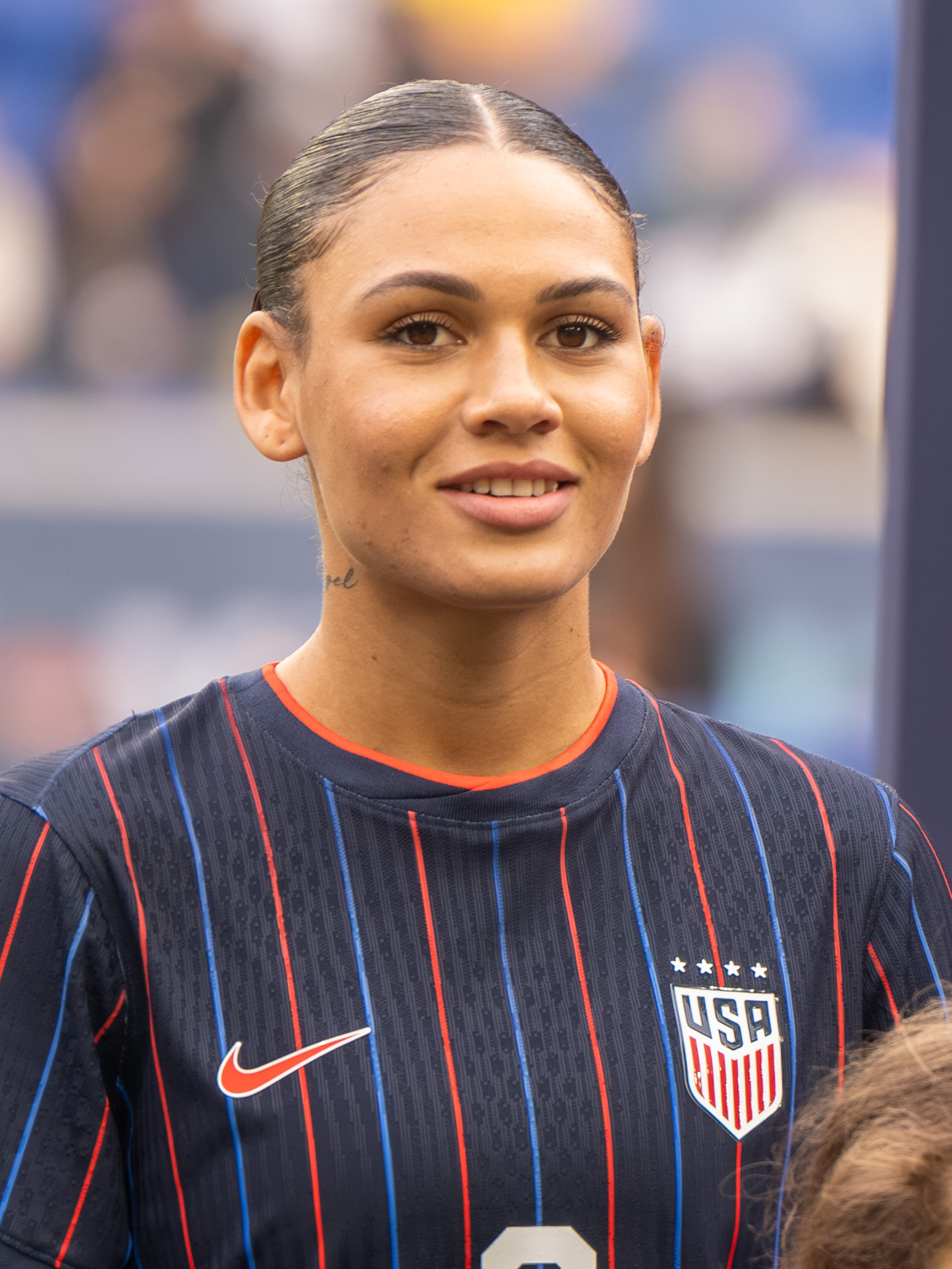
- Rodman with the United States in 2026

Personal information
- Full name: Trinity Rain Moyer-Rodman
- Date of birth: May 20, 2002 (age 24)
- Place of birth: Newport Beach, California, United States
- Height: 5 ft 8 in (1.73 m)
- Position: Forward

Team information
- Current team: Washington Spirit
- Number: 2

Youth career
- So Cal Blues

College career
Years	Team	Apps	(Gls)
2020	Washington State Cougars	0	(0)

Senior career*
Years	Team	Apps	(Gls)
2021–	Washington Spirit	127	(40)

International career^{‡}
2017–2018	United States U17		
2019–2020	United States U20		
2022–	United States	59	(13)
Medal record
Women's soccer
Representing the United States
Olympic Games
Gold medal – first place	2024 Paris	Team
CONCACAF W Championship
Winner	2022 Mexico
CONCACAF W Gold Cup
Winner	2024 United States
- * Club domestic league appearances and goals as of November 4, 2026 ‡ National team caps and goals as of October 13, 2026

Trinity Rain Moyer-Rodman (born May 20, 2002) is an American professional soccer player who plays as a forward for the Washington Spirit of the National Women's Soccer League (NWSL) and the United States national team.

Rodman was the second overall pick by the Spirit in the 2021 NWSL Draft, becoming the NWSL's youngest draftee at the time at age 18. She helped the club win the NWSL Championship and was named the NWSL Rookie of the Year and NWSL Best XI First Team in her debut season. She has been named to the NWSL Best XI three times with the Spirit.

Rodman was named the U.S. Soccer Young Female Player of the Year in 2021, making her senior debut for the United States the following year. She scored three goals at the 2024 Paris Olympics, where the United States won gold.

== Early life ==
Trinity Rain Moyer-Rodman was born on May 20, 2002, in Newport Beach, California, to Michelle Moyer and former professional basketball player Dennis Rodman. She and her brother, DJ Rodman, were raised primarily by their mother in southern California. Rodman has said she went through long stretches without speaking to her father, and she briefly lived with her mother in their car. She also has a half-sister.

Rodman began playing soccer at age four and said it "felt like home" to her as young as seven or eight. She was encouraged by her mother and sister to pursue her dream of becoming a professional soccer player.

Rodman began playing club soccer with the SoCal Blues at the age of ten. Her team won four national championships in the Elite Clubs National League (ECNL) and maintained a five-year undefeated streak. Rodman attended and played for Corona del Mar High School for one year as a freshman before transferring to JSerra Catholic High School in nearby San Juan Capistrano but did not play for the school.

Rodman initially committed to play collegiate soccer for the UCLA Bruins before deciding to follow her older brother to the Washington State Cougars beginning in the 2020 season. However, she never played a match in college, as her freshman season was canceled due to the COVID-19 pandemic and she decided to turn professional.

== Club career ==
=== Washington Spirit ===
==== 2021 ====
At age 18, Rodman became the youngest player to be drafted in NWSL history when the Washington Spirit selected her as their first draft pick (second overall) at the 2021 NWSL College Draft. Before being drafted by the Spirit, she had never been to Washington, D.C. Rodman made her professional debut on April 10, 2021, scoring a goal within five minutes of being subbed on against the North Carolina Courage in the 2021 NWSL Challenge Cup group stage. On April 15, she assisted Ashley Sanchez's stoppage-time winner in a 1–0 victory over Racing Louisville. She appeared in all four of the Spirit's matches during the Challenge Cup, where they finished in fourth place in the East Division with a 1–2–1 record.

Rodman was the Spirit's second-leading scorer with 6 goals (behind Ashley Hatch) and added 5 assists in 22 games in her rookie regular season. The team finished in third place during the regular season with a 11–7–6 record and advanced to the playoffs. After the Spirit defeated North Carolina Courage 1–0, Rodman scored in the Spirit's 2–1 win against OL Reign to advance to the final, where they faced the Chicago Red Stars. Rodman helped lift the Spirit to their first league championship with an assist Kelley O'Hara's winning goal. At age 19, Rodman became the youngest player in league history to record an assist in the playoffs.

On November 17, 2021, Rodman was named NWSL Rookie of the Year and to the NWSL Best XI. She earned U.S. Soccer Young Female Player of the Year honors the following month. On February 2, 2022, Rodman signed a contract extension with the Washington Spirit running until after the 2024 season, with an option for 2025. It was reported that the new contract was worth $1.1 million, making Rodman the highest paid player in NWSL history.

==== 2022 ====
On April 3, 2022, Rodman scored once and assisted twice in a 4–1 win against the Orlando Pride in the 2022 NWSL Challenge Cup group stage. In the following game, she scored a brace as the Spirit came back to defeat NJ/NY Gotham FC 3–1 on April 17. She recorded four goals and three assists in eight games in the Challenge Cup as Washington reached the final, a 2–1 losing effort against the North Carolina despite Rodman's game-tying assist to Ashley Hatch.

On August 13, 2022, Rodman was nominated for the Ballon d'Or Féminin. She was a nominee for the Best Breakthrough Athlete ESPY Award. She finished the 2022 regular season with 4 goals and 2 assists in 18 games as the defending champions crashed to 11th out of 12 teams in the league.

==== 2023 ====
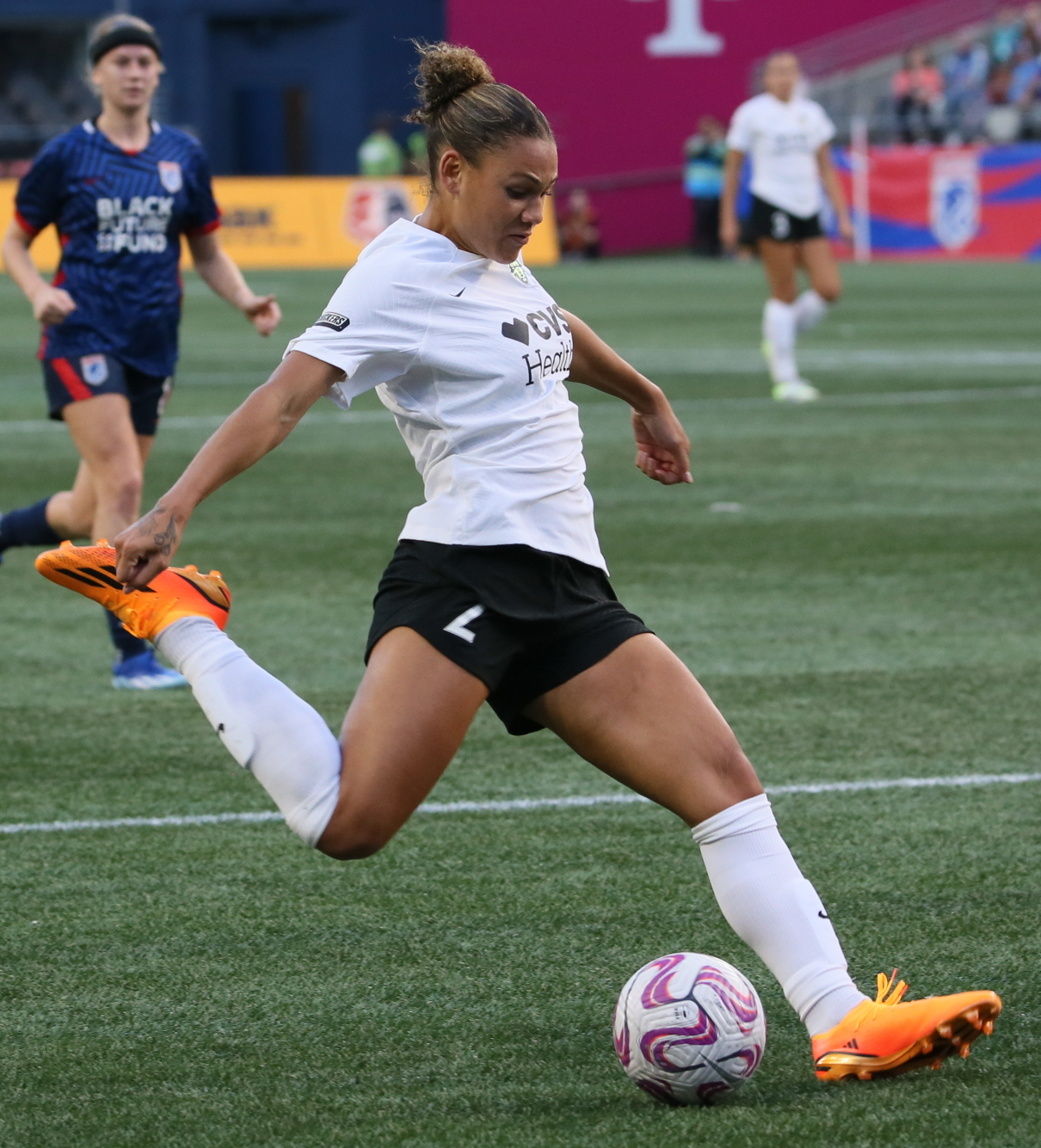
Rodman with the Spirit in 2023

Rodman opened the 2023 season with two goals and an assist in the first three games and helped the Spirit earn points from their first seven games. On May 6, 2023, she scored and assisted Ashley Sanchez in a 3–1 win against the San Diego Wave. She scored a third-minute goal against Racing Louisville on June 3. She finished the 2023 season with 5 goals and 2 assists in 19 games, with Washington finishing in eighth place and missing the playoffs. Rodman was named in the NWSL Best XI Second Team.

==== 2024 ====
Rodman was the Spirit's joint-leading scorer in the 2024 regular season with 8 goals (tied with Ouleymata Sarr) and 6 assists in 23 games. Two of her goals won NWSL Goal of the Week. On September 20, 2024, she left the game against the Kansas City Current in a wheelchair due to back spasms. She returned to action three games later and helped the team finish second in the regular-season standings. Despite still dealing with the back injury, she played all 330 minutes of the playoffs as Washington beat Bay FC in overtime, overcame NJ/NY Gotham FC on penalties, and fell one goal short to the Orlando Pride in the championship game. Rodman was named in the NWSL Best XI and was one of five nominees for NWSL Most Valuable Player, losing to Temwa Chawinga.

==== 2025 ====
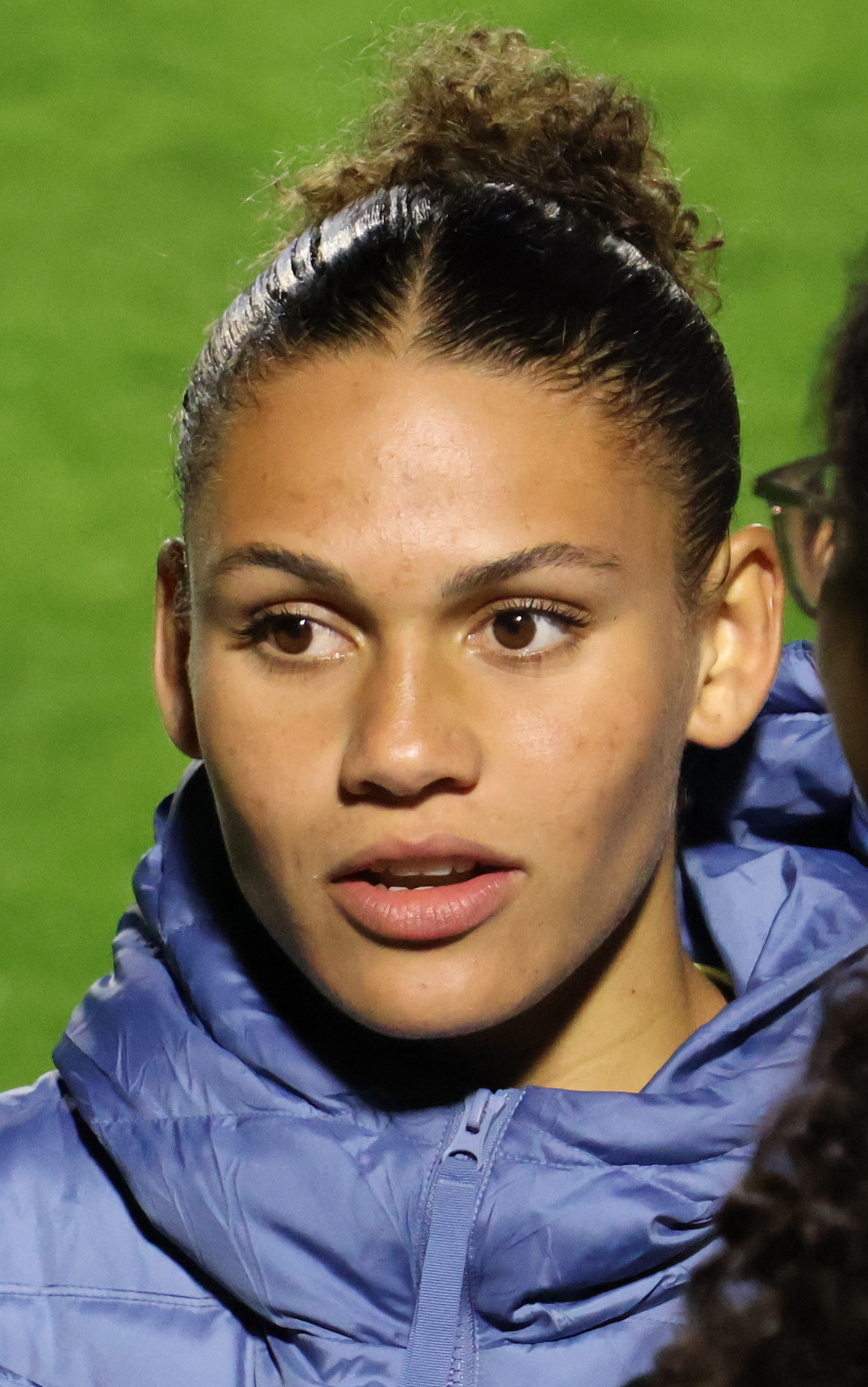
Rodman with the Washington Spirit in 2024

Rodman began the season as an unused substitute in the 2025 NWSL Challenge Cup before playing off the bench in the season-opening win over the Houston Dash. However, she continued to suffer from her back injury and took time off to rehab with a doctor in London. On August 3, after four months away, she returned to the NWSL and scored an emotional game-winner in a 2–1 victory over the Portland Thorns. She was named the NWSL Player of the Month for September after scoring three goals with two assists in four starts. On October 15, she suffered a Grade 1 medial collateral ligament (MCL) sprain in her right knee during a CONCACAF W Champions Cup match against Monterrey. She missed the rest of the regular season and finished with 5 goals in 15 league games as the Spirit placed second for a second consecutive year. She returned in the playoff semifinals on November 15, as a late substitute in a 2–0 win over the Portland Thorns. She then played in a second consecutive NWSL Championship but said she "definitely underperformed" as she recorded no shots in 33 minutes in the 1–0 loss to Gotham FC. Her impending free agency created much discussion, including questioning of the league's salary cap, and NWSL commissioner Jessica Berman said: "We want Trinity in our league and we will fight for her".

==== 2026 ====
On January 22, 2026, it was reported that the Washington Spirit had re-signed Rodman on a three-year contract, with an annual salary of over $2 million, reportedly making her "the highest-paid player in league history and the highest-paid female player in the world".

== International career ==
Rodman has represented the United States on the senior, under-20, and under-17 national teams. She competed at the 2018 FIFA U-17 Women's World Cup in Uruguay where she played 165 minutes and notched one assist. In 2020, she scored nine goals (including four against Honduras and two against Mexico in the final) and helped the United States win the 2020 CONCACAF Women's U-20 Championship. She was nominated for the U.S. Soccer Young Female Player of the Year award the same year, but did not win. She won the award in 2021.

In January 2022, Rodman was named to the senior national team's camp for the first time ahead of the 2022 SheBelieves Cup. She made her national team debut on February 17, 2022, in a 0–0 draw with Czech Republic at the tournament, and scored her first goal on April 12, 2022, in a friendly against Uzbekistan, in her third national team appearance. In June 2022, Rodman was named to the U.S. roster for the 2022 CONCACAF W Championship team.

External videos
- USWNT vs. Wales: Trinity Rodman Second Goal on July 9, 2023 retrieved July 10, 2023

In June 2023, Rodman was named to the U.S. squad for the 2023 FIFA Women's World Cup in Australia and New Zealand. During a World Cup send-off international friendly against Wales on July 9, she scored a brace leading the U.S. to a 2–0 win after subbing in for Alex Morgan during the 46th minute. Named Woman of the Match, Rodman is the youngest player to score a brace in team history. Head coach Vlatko Andonovski described her second goal as "world class".

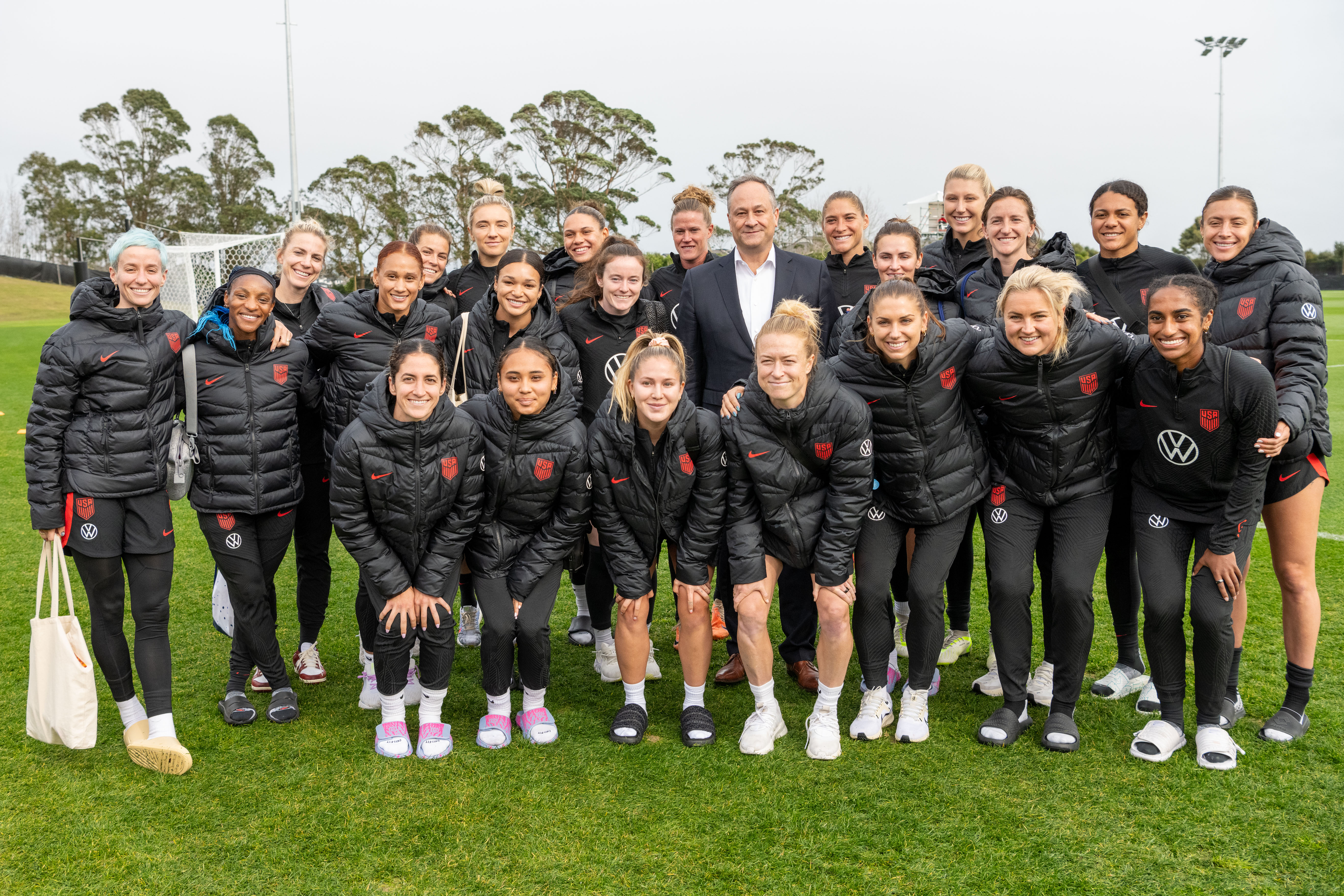
Rodman with the U.S. national team and then-U.S. Second Gentleman, Doug Emhoff, July 2023

Rodman made her World Cup debut during the team's first group stage match against Vietnam: a 3–0 win.

On June 26, 2024, Rodman was one of the 18 players named by Emma Hayes to represent the United States at the 2024 Summer Olympics. After scoring two goals in the group stage, she scored in extra time in the first knockout game against Japan on August 3 to advance to the semifinals. She started in the gold medal game against Brazil, which the United States won 1–0 on a goal from Mallory Swanson.

In December 2024 she was voted by The Guardian in 5th place among the top 100 women footballers in the world.

== Personal life ==
In July 2023, Rodman was in a relationship with Chris Kuzemka.

In May 2024, Rodman began dating former NFL wide receiver Trinity Benson.

In December 2024, Rodman appeared on the Call Her Daddy podcast and spoke about her relationship with her father, Dennis, saying, "He's not a dad. Maybe by blood, but nothing else." She described him as a controlling parent and said that, as a child, she gave up on living with him because of his party lifestyle. Rodman said she "lost hope in ever getting him back" after he attended one of her Washington Spirit matches unannounced in 2021 and then did not speak to her again until 2023.

In early 2025, Rodman began dating tennis player Ben Shelton.

== Other work ==
Rodman has endorsement deals with Red Bull, Oakley, and Adidas. She is the author of a children's book, entitled Wake Up and Kick It. In June 2022, Rodman was featured in ESPN SportsCenter's "Trinity Rodman" as part of ESPN's Fifty/50 month-long programming in honor of the 50th anniversary of Title IX in the United States. She has starred in television commercials for Verizon, Rexona, and Fox Soccer.

=== In popular culture ===
==== Print media ====
Rodman was featured on the June 2023 cover of Sports Illustrated along with national teammates Rose Lavelle, Alex Morgan, and Sophia Smith.

==== Television and film ====
Rodman co-starred in a television commercial for Adidas in June 2023 with Candace Parker, Patrick Mahomes, and Aliyah Boston, called "The Greatest Soccer Player". In July 2023, she co-starred in a commercial for Degree along with Sam Kerr and Estefanía Banini. Rodman appeared in another television commercial for Adidas in February 2024 which aired during the 2024 Super Bowl with Lionel Messi, Linda Caicedo, Rohit Sharma, and Jude Bellingham.

== Career statistics ==
=== Club ===
As of match played November 1, 2026

Appearances and goals by club, season and competition
Club	Season	League			Challenge Cup		Other		Total	
Club	Season	Division	Apps	Goals	Apps	Goals	Apps	Goals	Apps	Goals
Washington Spirit	2021	NWSL	22	6	4	1	3 (Note: Appearances in NWSL Playoffs)	1	29	8
Washington Spirit	2022	NWSL	18	4	8	4	—		26	8
Washington Spirit	2023	NWSL	19	5	0	0	—		19	5
Washington Spirit	2024	NWSL	23	8	—		2	0	25	8
Washington Spirit	2025	NWSL	15	5	0	0	2	0	17	5
Washington Spirit	2026	NWSL	30	12	—		0	0	30	12
Career total			127	40	12	5	7	1	146	46

=== International ===
As of match played October 13, 2026

Appearances and goals by national team and year
National team	Year	Apps	Goals
United States	2022	10	2
United States	2023	18	5
United States	2024	18	3
United States	2025	1	1
United States	2026	12	2
Total		59	13

Scores and results list United States's goal tally first, score column indicates score after each Rodman goal.

List of international goals scored by Trinity Rodman
No.	Date	Venue	Opponent	Score	Result	Competition	Ref.
1	April 12, 2022	Chester, Pennsylvania, United States	Uzbekistan	7–0	9–0	Friendly	
2	July 7, 2022	Guadalupe, Mexico	Jamaica	5–0	5–0	2022 CONCACAF W Championship	
3	July 9, 2023	San Jose, California, United States	Wales	1–0	2–0	Friendly	
4	July 9, 2023	San Jose, California, United States	Wales	2–0	2–0	Friendly	
5	September 21, 2023	Cincinnati, Ohio, United States	South Africa	2–0	3–0	Friendly	
6	September 24, 2023	Chicago, Illinois, United States	South Africa	1–0	2–0	Friendly	
7	December 2, 2023	Fort Lauderdale, Florida, United States	China	3–0	3–0	Friendly	
8	July 25, 2024	Nice, France	Zambia	1–0	3–0	2024 Summer Olympics	
9	July 31, 2024	Marseille, France	Australia	1–0	2–1	2024 Summer Olympics	
10	August 3, 2024	Paris, France	Japan	1–0	1–0	2024 Summer Olympics	
11	April 5, 2025	Inglewood, California, United States	Brazil	1–0	2–0	Friendly	
12	January 24, 2026	Carson, California, United States	Paraguay	4–0	6–0	Friendly	
13	January 27, 2026	Santa Barbara, California, United States	Chile	5–0	5–0	Friendly	

== Honors ==
Washington Spirit

- NWSL Championship: 2021
- NWSL Challenge Cup: 2025

United States

- Summer Olympic Games Gold Medal: 2024
- CONCACAF Women's Championship: 2022
- CONCACAF W Gold Cup: 2024
- SheBelieves Cup: 2022, 2023,2024
- CONCACAF Women's U-20 Championship: 2020

Individual

- U.S. Soccer Young Female Player of the Year: 2021
- NWSL Rookie of the Year: 2021
- NWSL Best XI: 2021, 2024, 2026
- NWSL Second XI: 2023
- ESPN FC Women's Rank: #8 on the 2024 list of 50 best women's soccer players 2024
- IFFHS Women's World Team: 2024
