= Rebeca Bernal =

Mexican footballer (born 1997)

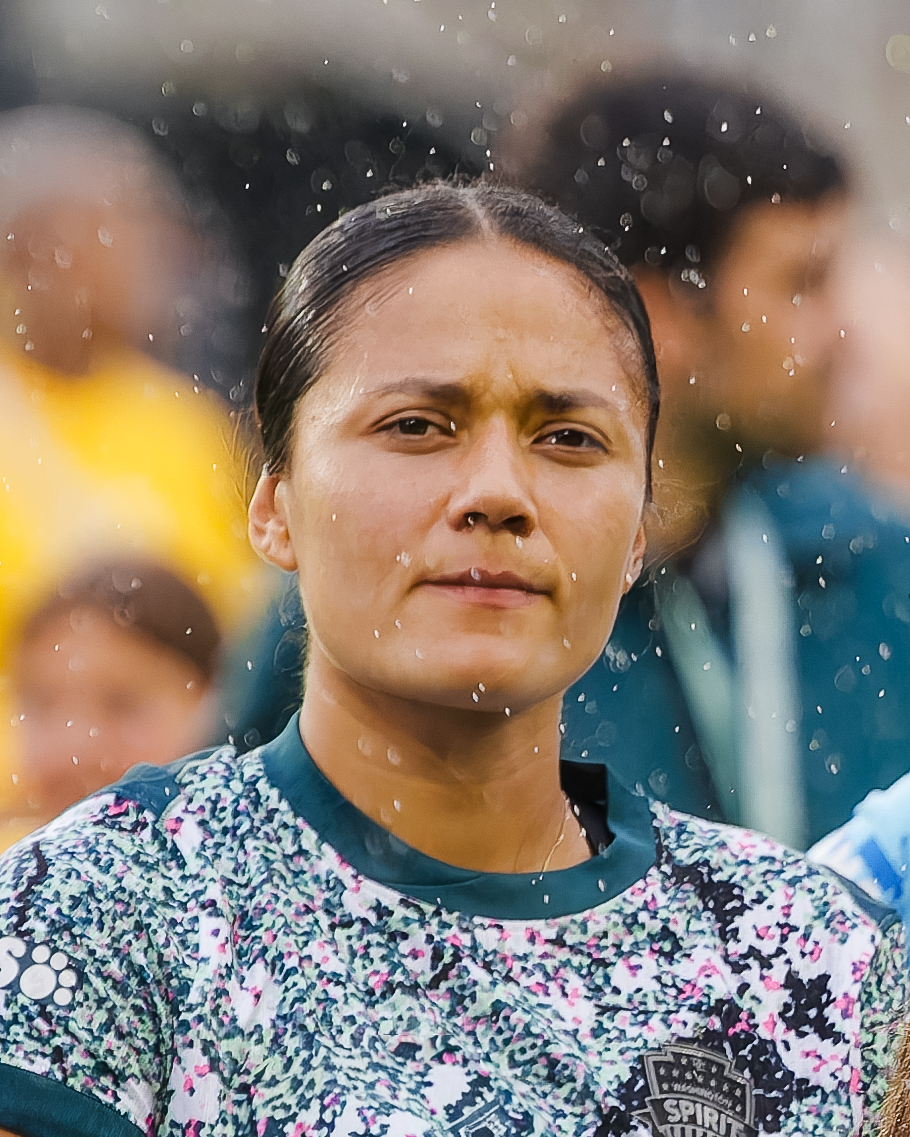
- Bernal with the Washington Spirit in 2026

Personal information
- Full name: Rebeca Bernal Rodríguez
- Date of birth: 31 August 1997 (age 29)
- Place of birth: Tampico, Tamaulipas, Mexico
- Height: 1.68 m (5 ft 6 in)
- Positions: Defensive midfielder; centre-back

Team information
- Current team: Manchester United
- Number: 16

Senior career*
Years	Team	Apps	(Gls)
2017–2025	Monterrey	274	(66)
2025–2026	Washington Spirit	44	(3)
2026–	Manchester United	5	(0)

International career^{‡}
2014–2015	Mexico U-17		
2015–2016	Mexico U-20		
2016–	Mexico	82	(10)
Medal record
Women's football
Representing Mexico
Pan American Games
Gold medal – first place	2023 Santiago	Team
Central American and Caribbean Games
Gold medal – first place	2023 San Salvador
- * Club domestic league appearances and goals as of 8 November 2026 ‡ National team caps and goals as of 13 October 2026

Rebeca Bernal Rodríguez (born 31 August 1997), is a Mexican professional footballer who plays as a defensive midfielder or centre back for Women's Super League team Manchester United and captains the Mexico women's national team.

== Early life ==
Bernal joined Escuela de Futbol Cruz Azul in Ciudad Madero, where she was the only girl, around the age of seven. When she was 14, she moved to Monterrey to study psychology at the Monterrey Institute of Technology and Higher Education.

== Club career ==
Bernal joined CF Monterrey at the formation of Liga MX Femenil in the Apertura 2017.

She joined NWSL club Washington Spirit on 25 February 2025, signing a three-year deal in exchange for an undisclosed transfer fee. She won a trophy on her debut for the Spirit on 7 March, defeating the Orlando Pride on penalties in the 2025 NWSL Challenge Cup. Bernal converted her penalty kick in the shootout.

On 2 September 2026, Bernal signed for English Women's Super League club Manchester United, signing a three-year contract for a reported fee of £300,000. She was the first Mexican player to feature in the WSL.

== International career ==
Bernal played for Mexico at youth level at the 2014 FIFA U-17 Women's World Cup and the 2016 FIFA U-20 Women's World Cup. She made her senior debut on 8 July 2017, starting in a 1–0 friendly loss to Sweden.

Bernal was selected to represent Mexico at the 2023 Pan American Games held in Santiago, Chile, where the Mexican squad went undefeated to win the gold medal for the first time in their history at the Pan American Games, defeating Chile 1–0. Bernal scored Mexico's winning goal.

== International career ==
As of match played 13 October 2026

Appearances and goals by national team and year
National team	Year	Apps	Goals
Mexico	2017	1	0
Mexico	2018	6	0
Mexico	2020	1	0
Mexico	2021	11	1
Mexico	2022	8	2
Mexico	2023	11	2
Mexico	2024	14	2
Mexico	2025	9	1
Mexico	2026	8	2
Total		70	10

=== International goals ===
No.	Date	Venue	Opponent	Score	Result	Competition
1.	20 February 2021	Estadio Azteca, Mexico City, Mexico	Costa Rica	3–1	3–1	Friendly
2.	17 February 2022	Estadio Universitario, San Nicolás de los Garza, Mexico	Suriname	6–0	9–0	2022 CONCACAF W Championship qualification
3.	20 February 2022	Estadio Olímpico Félix Sánchez, Santo Domingo Dominican Republic	Antigua and Barbuda	2–0	8–0	2022 CONCACAF W Championship qualification
4.	25 October 2023	Estadio Sausalito, Viña del Mar, Chile	Chile	1–1	3–1	2023 Pan American Games
5.	3 November 2023	Estadio Elías Figueroa Brander, Valparaíso, Chile	Chile	1–0	1–0	2023 Pan American Games
6.	23 February 2024	Dignity Health Sports Park, Carson, United States	Dominican Republic	5–0	8–0	2024 CONCACAF W Gold Cup
7.	30 November 2024	Estadio Andrés Quintana Roo, Cancún, Mexico	Costa Rica	3–1	4–1	Friendly
8.	5 April 2025	CPKC Stadium, Kansas City, United States	Jamaica	3–0	3–0	Friendly
9.	2 March 2026	Daren Sammy Cricket Ground, Gros Islet, Saint Lucia	Saint Lucia	1–0	7–0	2026 CONCACAF W Championship qualification
10.	9 October 2026	Estadio Victoria, Aguascalientes, Mexico	Jamaica	2–3	3–4	Friendly

== Honors ==
Washington Spirit

- NWSL Challenge Cup: 2025

Mexico U17

- CONCACAF Women's U-17 Championship: 2013

Individual

- CONCACAF W Gold Cup Best XI: 2024
