= Meg Boade =

American soccer player (born 2002)

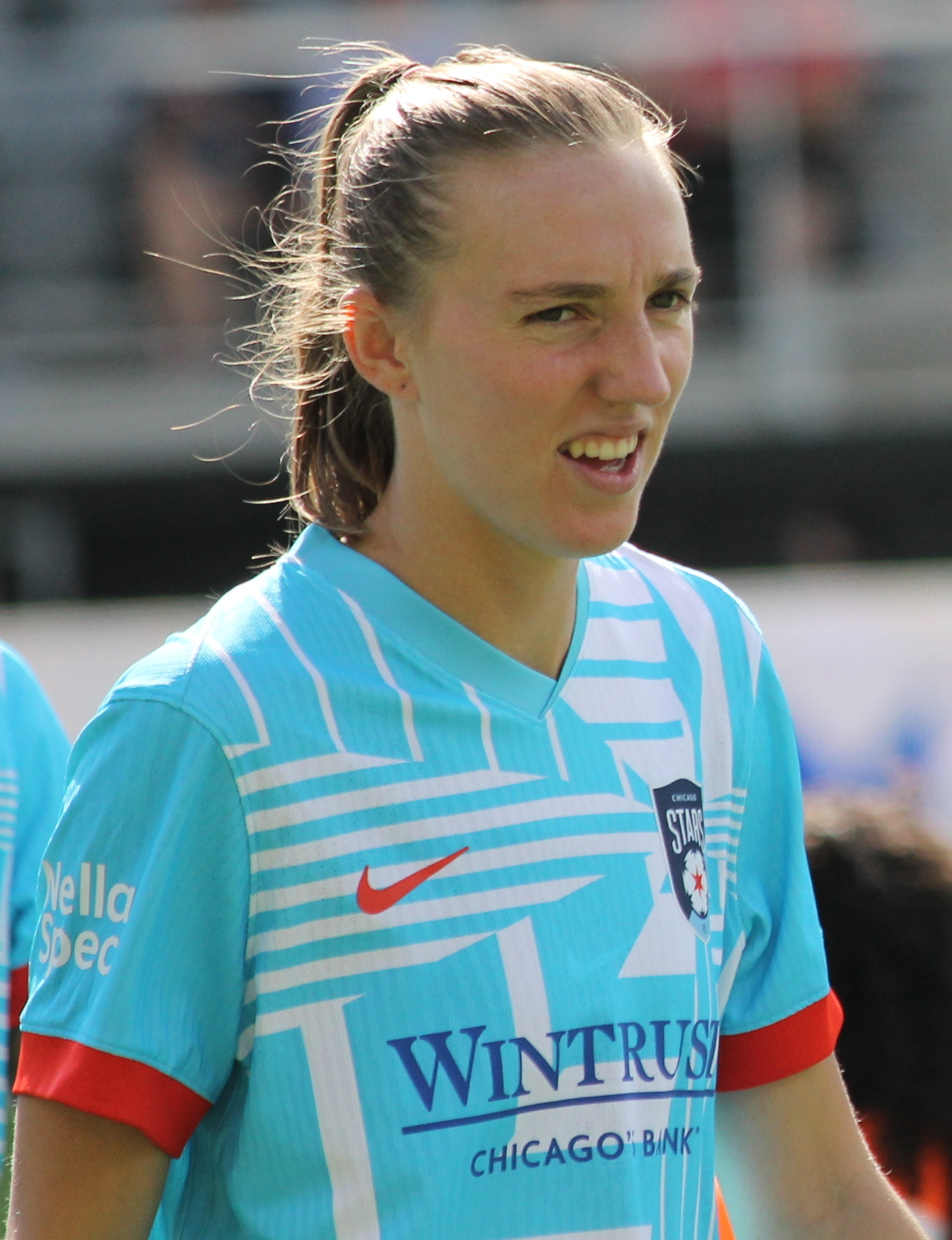
- Boade with the Chicago Stars in 2025

Personal information
- Full name: Margaret Diane Boade
- Date of birth: July 3, 2002 (age 24)
- Place of birth: Dallas, Texas, U.S.
- Height: 5 ft 8 in (1.73 m)
- Position: Midfielder

Team information
- Current team: Denver Summit
- Number: 34

Youth career
- 2016–2019: Real Colorado

College career
Years	Team	Apps	(Gls)
2020–2023	Northwestern Wildcats	66	(12)
2024	UCLA Bruins	24	(1)

Senior career*
Years	Team	Apps	(Gls)
2025	Washington Spirit	3	(1)
2025	Gotham FC	0	(0)
2025	Chicago Stars	0	(0)
2026–	Denver Summit	0	(0)
- * Club domestic league appearances and goals as of 16:15, December 31, 2025 (UTC)

Margaret Diane Boade (born July 3, 2002) is an American professional soccer player who plays as a midfielder for Denver Summit FC of the National Women's Soccer League (NWSL). She played college soccer for the Northwestern Wildcats and UCLA Bruins. She began her professional career with stints with the Washington Spirit, Gotham FC, and Chicago Stars in 2025. She is the sister of soccer player Tess Boade.

== Early life ==
Boade was born in Dallas, Texas, before moving to Golden, Colorado, where she grew up. She attended Valor Christian High School where she competed in basketball, soccer and track. In 2018, Boade led her U-16/U-17 Real Colorado team to the U.S. Soccer Development Academy National Championship.

== College career ==
=== Northwestern Wildcats ===
Boade started her college career with the Northwestern Wildcats. In 2022, she started all 23 matches and scored seven goals, leading Northwestern to match their best finish in school history. The following year, she secured the program record for assists in a season with 14 assists over the course of one season. Boade was also named to the Mac Hermann Trophy watchlist at the end of the year.

=== UCLA Bruins ===
Due to the COVID-19 pandemic, Boade was granted an extra year of college eligibility. For her 5th year, she attended UCLA, where she led them to a Big 10 Women's Soccer Championship. Despite the Bruins having 6 NWSL players signed after this season, they were upset in the round of 32 of the NCAA tournament.

== Club career ==
Boade started off 2025 by training with Racing Louisville FC as a non-rostered invitee. Racing Louisville ultimately did not sign Boade and later released her in February.

On March 5, 2025, Boade signed a short-term injury replacement contract with the Washington Spirit. Two days later, the Spirit secured the 2025 NWSL Challenge Cup title after beating the Orlando Pride on penalties. Boade was an unused substitute in the match. She made her professional debut on March 14, 2025, coming on as a substitute in the Spirit's 2–1 victory versus the Houston Dash. On May 10, she made her first career start in a road win against Chicago Stars FC. In the Spirit's next match, Boade earned another start and also scored her first professional goal as the Spirit drew with Utah Royals, 3–3. She did not make any further appearances before her contract expired in late June.

Gotham FC signed Boade to a national team replacement contract on July 14, 2025. She ultimately did not appear for Gotham before joining Chicago Stars FC on a roster relief contract on August 22. On October 8, the Stars extended Boade's contract through November 22.

On March 10, 2026, NWSL expansion team Denver Summit FC announced the signing of Boade before their inaugural season in her home state.

== International career ==
Boade was called into training camp with the United States under-23 team, practicing alongside the senior national team, in March 2025.

Boade was also previously invited to a U-18 Camp in October 2019.

== Personal life ==
Her sister, Tess Boade, plays professionally for Gotham FC.

== Honors and awards ==
Washington Spirit

- NWSL Challenge Cup: 2025

Individual

- First-team All-Big Ten: 2022, 2023
