= 2025 NWSL Challenge Cup =

- Event: NWSL Challenge Cup
Orlando Pride	Washington Spirit
1	1
- Washington Spirit won 4–2 on penalties
- Date: March 7, 2025
- Venue: Inter&Co Stadium, Orlando, Florida
- Most Valuable Player: Aubrey Kingsbury
- Referee: Alex Billeter
- Attendance: 8,880

The 2025 NWSL Challenge Cup, known as the Unwell Hydration x 2025 NWSL Challenge Cup for sponsorship reasons, was the sixth edition of the NWSL Challenge Cup, a women's soccer competition organized by the National Women's Soccer League (NWSL). The match was the second Challenge Cup to be played in the super cup format as a one-off game. It featured the Orlando Pride, champions of the 2024 National Women's Soccer League, and the Washington Spirit. The match was played on March 7, 2025, and hosted by the Orlando Pride at Inter&Co Stadium in Orlando, Florida. Washington won on penalties after a 1–1 draw in regulation time.

== Teams ==
Team	Qualification	Previous final appearances (bold indicates winners)
Orlando Pride	2024 NWSL champions 2024 NWSL Shield winners	none
Washington Spirit	2024 NWSL runners up	1 (2022)

== Match ==
=== Details ===
March 7, 2025
8:00 pm EDT

Orlando Pride	1–1	Washington Spirit
Souza 41'	Report	Santos 72'
Penalties
Doyle (penalty scored); Angelina (penalty scored); Yates (penalty missed); Lemos (penalty missed)	2–4	(penalty scored) Hatch; (penalty scored) Bernal; (penalty scored) Miura; (penalty scored) McKeown

Inter&Co Stadium, Orlando, Florida
Attendance: 8,880
Referee: Alex Billeter
