= 2024 USC Trojans women's soccer team =

American college soccer season

2024 USC Trojans women's soccer

Big Ten Conference Regular season champions
- Conference: Big Ten Conference
- U. Soc. Coaches poll: No. 4
- TopDrawerSoccer.com: No. 5
- Record: 14-1-2 (10-0-1 Big Ten)
- Head coach: Jane Alukonis (2nd season)
- Assistant coaches: Sugar Shinohara (2nd season); Ahmad Brown (2nd season)
- Home stadium: Dignity Health Sports Park; Los Angeles Memorial Coliseum

The 2024 USC Trojans women's soccer team will represent the University of Southern California (USC) during the 2024 NCAA Division I women's soccer season.

== Squad ==
=== Roster ===
As of 12 Sep 2024

Note: Flags indicate national team as defined under FIFA eligibility rules; some limited exceptions apply. Players may hold more than one non-FIFA nationality.

No.	Pos.	Nation	Player
0	GK	CAN	Lawrence Gladu
1	GK	USA	Bella Grust
2	DF	USA	Alyssa Gonzalez
3	FW	USA	Kayla Colbert
4	DF	USA	Molly McDougal
5	FW	USA	Maile Hayes
6	FW	USA	Eleanor Morrissey
7	MF	USA	Florianne Jourde
8	DF	USA	Brooklyn Courtnall
9	FW	USA	Angeles Escobar
10	MF	USA	Maria Alagoa
11	FW	USA	Lily Biddulph
12	FW	USA	Faith George
13	GK	USA	Lana Gibbs
14	GK	USA	Phoebe Carver

No.	Pos.	Nation	Player
15	FW	USA	Maribel Flores
17	FW	USA	Izzy Kimberly
18	MF	USA	Ines Derrien
19	FW	JPN	Hana Mizumoto
20	FW	USA	Hannah Griffin
21	DF	USA	Brooke Juncaj
22	MF	BRA	Helena Sampaio
23	FW	USA	BK Harris
25	MF	USA	Aaliyah Farmer
27	DF	USA	Katie Park
28	DF	USA	Peyton Nakagawara
30	DF	USA	Cassie Bibby
54	FW	USA	Jaiden Anderson
36	DF	USA	Savannah Kessler
80	FW	USA	Simone Jackson

=== Team management ===
Position	Staff
Athletic Director	Jennifer Cohen
Head coach	Jane Alikonis
Assistant Coach	Sugar Shinohara
Assistant Coach	Ahmad Brown
Goalkeepers Coach	Cyrus Mohseni
Director of Operations	Spencer Williams

== Schedule ==
Date Time, TV	Rank^{#}	Opponent^{#}	Result	Record	Site (Attendance) City, State
Exhibition
August 10th 7:00 p.m.	No. 23	Long Beach State	W 5-1	--	Dignity Health Sports Park; Carson, California
Non-conference regular season
August 15th 6:00 p.m., ESPN+	No. 23	at New Mexico State	T 2-2	0-0-1	NM State Soccer Athletic Complex (2,234); Las Cruces, New Mexico
August 18th 6:00 p.m., ESPN+	No. 23	at California Baptist	W 1-0	1-0-1	CBU Soccer Stadium (774); Riverside, California
August 25th 1:00 p.m., ESPN+	No. 23	at Pepperdine	W 3-1	2-0-1	Tari Frahm Rokus Field (640); Malibu, California
August 31st 4:00 p.m., ESPN+		at Portland	W 2-1	3-0-1	Merlo Field (1,487); Portland, Oregon
September 5th 6:00 p.m., ESPN+		at San Francisco	W 2-0	4-0-1	Negoesco Stadium (428); San Francisco, California
September 8th 1:00 p.m., ACCN		at Stanford	L 1-2	4-1-1	Maloney Field (1,887); Stanford, California
Big Ten Conference Regular season
September 13th 7:00 p.m., BTN		at Washington	W 1-0	5-1-1 (1-0-0)	Husky Soccer Stadium (1,027); Seattle, Washington
September 19th 4:00 p.m., BTN	No. 25	at Purdue	W 1-0	6-1-1 (2-0-0)	Folk Field (749); West Lafayette, Indiana
September 22nd 9:00 a.m., BTN+	No. 24	at Indiana	W 2-0	7-1-1 (3-0-0)	Bill Armstrong Stadium (318); Bloomington, Indiana
September 26th 6:00 p.m., BTN+	No. 24	Minnesota	T 2-2	7-1-2 (3-0-1)	Dignity Health Sports Park (310); Carson, California
September 29th 11:00 a.m., BTN+	No. 24	Wisconsin	W 3-0	8-1-2 (4-0-1)	Dignity Health Sports Park (576); Carson, California
October 5th 12:00 p.m., BTN+	No. 24	Oregon	W 2-0	9-1-2 (5-0-1)	Dignity Health Sports Park (297); Carson, California
October 10th 5:00 p.m., BTN+	No. 21	at Illinois	W 3-2	10-1-2 (6-0-1)	Demirjian Park (501); Urbaba-Champaign, Illinois
October 13th 12:00 p.m., BTN+	No. 21	at Northwestern	W 2-1	11-1-2 (7-0-1)	Martin Stadium (855); Evanston, Illinois
October 17th 6:00 p.m., BTN+	No. 19	No. 15 Ohio State	W 1-0	12-1-2 (8-0-1)	Los Angeles Memorial Coliseum (1,081); Los Angeles, California
October 20th 12:00 p.m., BTN+	No. 19	No. 16 Penn State	W 2-1	13-1-2 (9-0-1)	Dignity Health Sports Park (522); Carson, California
October 27th 12:00 p.m., BTN+	No. 4	No. 8 UCLA; Rivalry	W 1-0	14-1-2 (10-0-1)	Los Angeles Memorial Coliseum (6,281); Los Angeles, California
Big Ten Tournament
November 4th (Note: Due to Inclement Weather in St. Paul arena, the game is being rescheduled from Sunday, November 3rd to Monday, November 4th.); 10:00 a.m., BTN+	(1) No. 4	vs. (9) No. 10 Ohio State; Quarterfinals	W 1-0 ^{OT}	15-1-2	Elizabeth Lyle Robbie Stadium; St. Paul, Minnesota
November 7th 12:00 p.m., BTN	(1) No. 4	vs. (5) Rutgers; Semifinals	L 1-1 (0-3) ^{PK}	15-2-2	Energizer Park; St. Louis, Missouri
NCAA tournament
November 17th 2:00 p.m., ESPN+	(1) No. 4	vs. Sacramento State; First Round	W 5-0	16-2-2	Dignity Health Sports Park (541); Carson, California
November 22nd 5:00 p.m., ESPN+	(1) No. 4	vs. (8) Saint Louis; Second Round			Great Park Soccer Stadium; Irvine, California
*Non-conference game. ^{#}Rankings from United Soccer Coaches. (#) Tournament seedings in parentheses. All times are in Pacific.

=== Southern California Bracket ===
First round Campus Sites
1	USC*	5
Sacramento State	0
Kansas	0
8	Saint Louis*	1
5	Wisconsin*	3
Maine	1
Princeton	1
4	Virginia*	2
3	Ohio State*	4
James Madison	1
FIU	1
6	Auburn*	4
7	Georgia*	2
Colorado	3
Morehead State	0
2	Wake Forest*	4

Second round Regional Campus Sites
1	USC*
8	Saint Louis
5	Wisconsin
4	Virginia
3	Ohio State
6	Auburn
Colorado
2	Wake Forest*

Round of 16; Regional Campus Sites

Quarterfinal; Campus Sites

* Host institution

==== Schedule ====
===== First round =====
November 15	Colorado	3–2	#7 Georgia	Athens, GA
4:30 p.m. EST	Ava Priest 24' (pen.); Hope Leyba 55'; Shyra James 63'	Report	(yellow card) 19' Cate Hardin; 30' Margie Detrizio; 37' Hannah White; (yellow card) 49' Abby Unkraut	Stadium: Turner Soccer Complex; Attendance: 600; Referee: Dorian del Toro Urueta; Assistant referees: Carmen Serbio; Margaret Burkett; Fourth official: Logan Busby

November 15	James Madison	1–4	#3 Ohio State	Columbus, OH
6:00 p.m. EST	Amanda Attanasi 35'; JMU Team (yellow card) 63'	Report	1' Amanda Schlueter; 21' Jacinda Bonham; 63' Kailyn Dudukovich; 68' Jadin Bonham	Stadium: Jesse Owens Memorial Stadium; Attendance: 692; Referee: Erin Patterson; Assistant referees: Aaron Fong; Laura Snyder; Fourth official: Jeffrey Mellen

November 15	Morehead State	0–4	#2 Wake Forest	Winston-Salem, NC
6:00 p.m. EST		Report	2' Anna Swanson; 13', 15' Caiya Hanks; 26' Emily Murphy	Stadium: W. Dennie Spry Soccer Stadium; Attendance: 601; Referee: John Matto; Assistant referees: Rick Rogers; Jason Kent; Fourth official: Dustin Thorne

November 15	Princeton	1–2	#4 Virginia	Charlottesville, VA
7:00 p.m. EST	Pietra Tordin 6'; Zoe Markesini (yellow card) 66'	Report	14' Yuna McCormack; (yellow card) 32' Kiki Maki; 48' Maggie Cagle	Stadium: Klöckner Stadium; Attendance: 1120; Referee: Jude Carr; Assistant referees: Jeremy Smith; Sharon Gingrich; Fourth official: Alex Luttmann

November 15	FIU	1–4	#6 Auburn	Auburn, AL
7:00 p.m. EST	Catherine Rapp 80'	Report	4' LJ Knox; 24' Jessica Osborne; 78' Jordyn Crosby; 84' Hayden Colson	Stadium: Auburn Soccer Complex; Attendance: 551; Referee: Amin Hadzic; Assistant referees: Shevah Rezaee; Gunwan Park; Fourth official: Thomas Brigman

November 15	Kansas	0–1	#8 Saint Louis	Saint Louis, MO
7:00 p.m. CST		Report	20' Emily Gaebe	Stadium: Hermann Stadium; Attendance: 3,136; Referee: Shane Butler; Assistant referees: Zachary Richter; Joseph Macht; Fourth official: Braeden Frey

November 15	Maine	1–3	#5 Wisconsin	Madison, WI
7:00 p.m. CST	Julie Lossius (yellow card) 35'; Lara Kirkby 48'; Anna Phillips (yellow card) 52'	Report	2' Aryssa Mahrt; 4' Ashley Martinez; (yellow card) 35' Peighton Steffen; 57' Erin Connolly	Stadium: McClimon Soccer Complex; Attendance: 502; Referee: Katie McCormick; Assistant referees: Jared Kuehl; Adam Herges; Fourth official: Peter Bernardy

November 17	Sacramento State	0-5	#1 USC	Los Angeles, CA
2:00 p.m. PST	Abigail Lopez (yellow card) 65'; Dalen Lau (yellow card) 81'	Report	4' (pen.) Brooklyn Courtnall; 13' Helena Sampaio; 17' Simone Jackson; 50' Maria Alagoa; 90' Florianne Jourde	Stadium: McAlister Field; Attendance: 541; Referee: Joseph Salinas; Assistant referees: Shayan Afzali; Haily Morejon; Fourth official: Felix Granados

===== Second round =====
November 22	#6 Auburn	v	#3 Ohio State	Winston-Salem, NC
2:00 p.m. EST				Stadium: W. Dennie Spry Soccer Stadium

November 22	Colorado	v	#2 Wake Forest	Winston-Salem, NC
6:00 p.m. EST				Stadium: W. Dennie Spry Soccer Stadium

November 22	#8 Saint Louis	v	#1 USC	Los Angeles, CA
				Stadium: McAlister Field

November 22	#5 Wisconsin	v	#4 Virginia	Los Angeles, CA
				Stadium: McAlister Field

===== Round of 16 =====
November 24	v	Winston-Salem, NC
EST		Stadium: W. Dennie Spry Soccer Stadium

November 24	v	Los Angeles, CA
		Stadium: McAlister Field

===== Quarterfinals =====
v

Rankings shown are seeds in this bracket of the tournament.

== Game summaries ==
=== vs Long Beach State (Exhibition) ===
August 10th	Long Beach State	1-5	USC Trojans	Carson, California
7:00 p.m.	(goal)		(goal); (goal); (goal); (goal); (goal)	Stadium: Dignity Health Sports Park

=== at New Mexico State ===
August 15th 1 - Season and Road Opener	USC Trojans	2-2	New Mexico State	Las Cruces, New Mexico
6:00 p.m.	Maile Hayes (19:20); Maria Alagoa (58:45)	Report	Kennedy Herrera (76:38); Meredith Scott (89:24)	Stadium: NM State Soccer Athletic Complex; Attendance: 2,234; Referee: Cristian Hernandez; Assistant referees: Matthew Johnson; Jack Jaime; Fourth official: Agustin Arismendi

=== at California Baptist ===
August 18th 2	USC Trojans	v	Calfirnia Baptist	Riverside, California
6:00 p.m.				Stadium: CBU Soccer Stadium

=== at Pepperdine ===
August 5th 3	USC Trojans	v	Pepperdine	Malibu, California
1:00 p.m.				Stadium: Tari Frahm Rokus Field

=== at Portland ===
August 31st 4	USC Trojans	v	Portland	Portland, Oregon
4:00 p.m.				Stadium: Merlo Field

=== at San Francisco ===
September 5th 5	USC Trojans	v	San Francisco	San Francisco, California
6:00 p.m.				Stadium: Negoesco Stadium

=== at Stanford ===
September 8th 6	USC Trojans	v	Stanford	Stanford, California
1:00 p.m.				Stadium: Maloney Field

=== at Washington ===
September 13th 7	USC Trojans	v	Washington	Seattle, Washington
7:00 p.m.				Stadium: Husky Soccer Stadium

=== at Purdue ===
September 19th 8	USC Trojans	v	Purdue	West Lafayette, Indiana
4:00 p.m.				Stadium: Folk Field

=== at Indiana ===
September 22nd 9	USC Trojans	v	Indiana	Bloomington, Indiana
9:00 a.m.				Stadium: Bill Armstrong Stadium

=== vs Minnesota ===
September 26th 10	Minnesota	v	USC Trojans	Carson, California
6:00 p.m.				Stadium: Dignity Health Sports Park

=== vs Wisconsin ===
September 29th 11	Wisconsin	v	USC Trojans	Carson, California
11:00 a.m.				Stadium: Dignity Health Sports Park

=== vs Oregon ===
October 5th 12	Oregon	v	USC Trojans	Carson, California
12:00 p.m.				Stadium: Dignity Health Sports Park

=== at Illinois ===
October 10th 13	USC Trojans	v	Illinois	Urbana-Champaign, Illinois
5:00 p.m.				Stadium: Demirjian Park

=== at Northwestern ===
October 10th 14	USC Trojans	v	Northwestern	Evanston, Illinois
5:00 p.m.				Stadium: Martin Stadium

=== vs Ohio State ===
October 17th 15	Ohio State	v	USC Trojans	Los Angeles, California
6:00 p.m.				Stadium: Los Angeles Memorial Coliseum

=== vs Penn State ===
October 20th 16	Penn State	v	USC Trojans	Carson, California
12:00 p.m.				Stadium: Dignity Health Sports Park

=== vs UCLA (Rivalry) ===
October 27th 17	UCLA	v	USC Trojans	Los Angeles, California
12:00 p.m.				Stadium: Los Angeles Memorial Coliseum

== Big Ten Tournament ==
=== (#9) Ohio State ===
November 4th (Note: Due to Inclement Weather in St. Paul arena, the game is being rescheduled from Sunday, November 3rd to Monday, November 4th.) Quarterfinals	#9 Ohio State	0-1 (a.e.t.)	#1 USC	St. Paul Minnesota
10:00 a.m.		Report		Stadium: Elizabeth Lyle Robbie Stadium; Referee: Nicole Green; Assistant referees: Kip Jackson; Eric Wood; Fourth official: Matt Tiano

=== (#5) Rutgers ===
November 7th Semifinals	(#5) Rutgers	v	(#1) USC	St. Louis, Missouri
12:00 p.m.				Stadium: Energizer Park

=== (TBD) UCLA or Washington ===
November 10th Finals	#2 UCLA or #6 Washington	v	#1 USC	St. Louis, Missouri
TBD				Stadium: Energizer Park

=== NCAA Tournament ===
TBD TBD	TBD	v	TBD	TBD
TBD p.m.				Stadium: TBD

== Rankings ==
Ranking movements Legend: ██ Increase in ranking ██ Decrease in ranking — = Not ranked
	Week																
Poll	Pre	1	2	3	4	5	6	7	8	9	10	11	12	13	14	15	Final
United Soccer	23	—-	—-	—-	—-	—-	24	21	19	9	6	4	Not released				
TopDrawer Soccer	20	24	—-	—-	—-	—-	—-	—-	—-	—-	15	8	5				
