= 2024 Big Ten women's soccer tournament =

Postseason women's soccer tournament

- Classification: Division I
- Teams: 10
- Matches: 9
- Attendance: 2,704
- Quarterfinals site: Elizabeth Lyle Robbie Stadium; Falcon Heights, Minnesota
- Semifinals site: Energizer Park; St. Louis, Missouri
- Finals site: Energizer Park; St. Louis, Missouri
- Champions: UCLA (1st title)
- Winning coach: Margueritte Aozasa (1st title)
- MVP: Quincy McMahon (UCLA)
- Broadcast: BTN, B1G+

2024 Big Ten Conference women's soccer standings
	Conf.						Overall
Team	W		L		T	PCT	W		L		T	PCT
No. 5 USC ‍†‍‍^{y}	10	–	0	–	1	.955	18	–	1	–	4	.870
No. 18 UCLA ‍‍‡‍^{y}	8	–	1	–	2	.818	17	–	4	–	3	.771
No. 12 Iowa ‍‍‍^{y}	8	–	2	–	1	.773	15	–	3	–	4	.773
No. 14 Michigan St ‍‍‍^{y}	7	–	1	–	3	.773	14	–	3	–	5	.750
Rutgers ‍‍‍^{y}	6	–	2	–	3	.682	11	–	5	–	5	.643
Washington ‍‍‍^{y}	7	–	4	–	0	.636	10	–	7	–	4	.571
No. 17 Minnesota ‍‍‍^{y}	6	–	3	–	2	.636	14	–	5	–	3	.705
No. 11 Ohio St ‍‍‍^{y}	6	–	3	–	2	.636	14	–	6	–	3	.674
No. 19 Wisconsin ‍‍‍^{y}	5	–	3	–	3	.591	10	–	6	–	4	.600
No. 8 Penn St ‍‍‍^{y}	5	–	4	–	2	.545	15	–	7	–	3	.660
Illinois ‍‍‍	4	–	6	–	1	.409	8	–	8	–	2	.500
Purdue ‍‍‍	3	–	7	–	1	.318	7	–	9	–	2	.444
Nebraska ‍‍‍	3	–	7	–	1	.318	6	–	10	–	1	.382
Michigan ‍‍‍	2	–	8	–	1	.227	3	–	13	–	2	.222
Northwestern ‍‍‍	1	–	8	–	2	.182	6	–	10	–	3	.395
Maryland ‍‍‍	1	–	8	–	2	.182	4	–	10	–	5	.342
Oregon ‍‍‍	1	–	8	–	2	.182	5	–	11	–	2	.333
Indiana ‍‍‍	1	–	9	–	1	.136	6	–	9	–	2	.412
† – Conference champion ‡ – 2024 Big Ten Tournament champion y – Invited to the NCAA Tournament; As of December 10, 2024; Rankings from United Soccer Coaches Poll; Source:Big Ten

The 2024 Big Ten women's soccer tournament was the postseason women's soccer tournament for the Big Ten Conference held from November 1 through November 10, 2024. The tournament was hosted by the University of Minnesota at Elizabeth Lyle Robbie Stadium for the First Round and the Quarterfinals then at Energizer Park in St. Louis, Missouri for the Semifinals and Finals. The ten-team single-elimination tournament consisted of four rounds based on seeding from regular season conference play. Iowa were the defending champions. Iowa was unable to defend its title, falling to Washington in a penalty shoot-out in the Quarterfinals. League newcomers UCLA would go on to win the tournament title, defeating Rutgers 5–0 in the Final. The conference tournament title was the first for UCLA and first for Margueritte Aozasa. As tournament champions, UCLA earned the Big Ten's automatic bid to the 2024 NCAA Division I women's soccer tournament.

== Seeding ==
The top ten teams in the regular season earned a spot in the tournament. Teams were seeded based on regular season conference records. A tiebreaker was needed to determine the fifth and sixth seeds as both Rutgers and Washington finished with twenty-one conference points. The two teams met during the regular season on September 22, and Rutgers won 1–0. Therefore, Rutgers earned the fifth seed while Washington earned the sixth seed.

Seed	School	Conference	Points
1	USC	10–0–1	31
2	UCLA	8–1–2	26
3	Iowa	8–2–1	25
4	Michigan State	7–1–3	24
5	Rutgers	6–2–3	21
6	Washington	7–4–0	21
7	Minnesota	6–3–2	20
8	Ohio State	6-3-2	20
9	Wisconsin	5–3–3	18
10	Penn State	5–4–2	17

== Bracket ==
1st Round; Friday, Nov. 1st
8	Wisconsin	0
9	Ohio State	1
7	Minnesota	0
10	Penn State	1

Quarterfinals; Saturday, Nov 2nd Monday, Nov 4th
1	USC (a.e.t.)	1
9	Ohio State	0
4	Michigan State	1
5	Rutgers (a.e.t.)	2
2	UCLA	1
10	Penn State	0
3	Iowa	0 (4)
6	Washington (pen.)	0 (5)

Semifinals; Thursday, Nov 7th
1	USC	1 (0)
5	Rutgers (pen.)	1 (3)
2	UCLA	2
6	Washington	0

Final; Sunday, Nov 10th
5	Rutgers	0
2	UCLA	5

== Schedule ==
=== First Round ===
November 1	#8 Wisconsin	0–1	#9 Ohio State	Saint Paul, MN
3:30 p.m. CT	Dara Andringa (yellow card) 28'; Aidan McConnell (yellow card) 36'	Report	(yellow card) 33' Mirann Gacioch; (yellow card) 72' Ava Bramblett; 79' Kailyn Dudukovich	Stadium: Elizabeth Lyle Robbie Stadium; Attendance: 1 Referee: Calin Radosav; Assistant referees: Zack Johnson; Justin Leung; Fourth official: Matt Tiano

November 1	#7 Minnesota	0–1	#10 Penn State	Saint Paul, MN
6:30 p.m. CT	Kate Childres (yellow card) 88'	Report	(yellow card) 79' Kayleigh Herr; 88' Mieke Schiemann	Stadium: Elizabeth Lyle Robbie Stadium; Attendance: 462; Referee: Dimitar Chavdarov; Assistant referees: Anis Tahar; Koffi Ezekiel Agbossou; Fourth official: Jorge Oconitrillo

=== Quarterfinals ===
November 2	#4 Michigan State	1–2 (a.e.t.)	#5 Rutgers	Saint Paul, MN
3:30 p.m. CT	Own Goal 1'	Report	31' Gia Cirman; (yellow card) 87' Shaela Bradley; 95' Ashley Baran	Stadium: Elizabeth Lyle Robbie Stadium; Attendance: 414; Referee: Khalaf Al-Latayfeh; Assistant referees: Brian McKay; Sean Giza; Fourth official: Robert Kerwood

November 2	#3 Iowa	0–0 (a.e.t.) (4–5 p)	#6 Washington	Saint Paul, MN
6:30 p.m. CT	Eva Pattison (yellow card) 71'	Report		Stadium: Elizabeth Lyle Robbie Stadium; Attendance: 414; Referee: Alex Beehler; Assistant referees: Yugrid Ventrua; Connor Dunn; Fourth official: Sonar Dogan
	Penalties
	Meike Ingles (penalty missed); Berkley Binggeli (penalty scored); Lauren Geczik (penalty scored); Madison Wilson (penalty scored); Kellen Fife (penalty scored); Berit Parten (penalty missed); Miah Schueller (penalty missed)		(penalty scored) Ioanna Papatheodorou; (penalty scored) Tatum Thomason; (penalty scored) Jadyn Holdenried; (penalty missed) Kalea Eichenberger; (penalty scored) Lucy Newlin; (penalty missed) Kolo Suliafu; (penalty scored) Alex Buck

November 4	#1 USC	1–0 (a.e.t.)	#9 Ohio State	Saint Paul, MN
12:00 p.m. CT	Helena Sampaio (yellow card) 57'; Jaiden Anderson 92'	Report	(yellow card) 87' Berkley Mape	Stadium: Elizabeth Lyle Robbie Stadium; Referee: Nicole Green; Assistant referees: Kip Jackson; Eric Wood; Fourth official: Matt Tiano

November 4	#2 UCLA	1–0	#10 Penn State	Saint Paul, MN
3:00 p.m. CT	Nicki Fraser 36'; Bridgette Marin-Valencia (yellow card) 53'; Jayden Perry (yellow card) 87'	Report	(yellow card) 23' Molly Martin	Stadium: Elizabeth Lyle Robbie Stadium; Attendance: 215; Referee: Victor Borges; Assistant referees: Colby Johnson; Bryan Conetta; Fourth official: Ryan Farrell

=== Semifinals ===
November 7th	#1 USC	1–1 (a.e.t.) (0–3 p)	#5 Rutgers	St. Louis, MO
12:00 p.m. CT	Simone Jackson 47'	Report	(red card) 49' Riley Tiernan; 52' Ashley Baran; (yellow card) 53' Sydney Urban; (yellow card) 70' Kylie Diagle	Stadium: Energizer Park; Referee: Art Arustamyan; Assistant referees: Zachary Richter; Sean West; Fourth official: Anthony Sobolevsky

November 7th	#2 UCLA	2–0	#6 Washington	St. Louis, MO
1:30 p.m. CT	Washington Own Goal 3'; Ayo Oke 35'	Report	(yellow card) 42' Kate Cheldelin	Stadium: Energizer Park; Attendance: 835; Referee: Shane Butler; Assistant referees: Matthew Rodman; Michael Heath; Fourth official: Matthew Geringer

=== Final ===
November 10	#2 UCLA	0–5	#5 Rutgers	St. Louis, MO
12:00 p.m. CT	Val Vargas 7'; Sofia Cook (yellow card) 41'; Taylor Cheatham 41'; Jordan Geis 45'; Lily Boyden 69'; Sophie Reale 83'	Report		Stadium: Energizer Park; Attendance: 777; Referee: Dimitrios Katsimingos; Assistant referees: Adam Herges; Jas Zahirovic; Fourth official: Braeden Frey

== Statistics ==
=== Goalscorers ===
There were 16 goals scored in 9 matches, for an average of 1.78 goals per match (as of November 10, 2024).

2 goals

- Ashley Baran – Rutgers

1 goal

- Jaiden Anderson – USC
- Lily Boyden – UCLA
- Taylor Cheatham – UCLA
- Gia Cirman – Rutgers
- Kailyn Dudukovich – Ohio State
- Nicki Fraser – UCLA
- Jordan Geis – UCLA
- Simone Jackson – USC
- Ayo Oke – UCLA
- Sophie Reale – UCLA
- Mieke Schiemann – Penn State
- Val Vargas – UCLA

1 own goal

- Rutgers (vs Michigan State)
- Washington (vs UCLA)

== All-Tournament team ==
Player	Team
Macy Enneking	Iowa
Kaleigh McPherson	Michigan State
Sydney Jones	Ohio State
Mieke Schiemann	Penn State
Olivia Bodmer	Rutgers
**Quincy McMahon**	UCLA
Jayden Perry	UCLA
Aaliyah Farmer	USC
Mia Hamant	Washington
Hailey Baumann	Wisconsin

MVP in bold
