= 2024 Penn State Nittany Lions women's soccer team =

American college soccer season

2024 Penn State Nittany Lions women's soccer

NCAA Tournament
- Conference: Big Ten Conference
- Record: 15-6-3 (5-4-2 Big Ten)
- Head coach: Erica Dambach (18th season)
- Assistant coaches: Ann Cook; Tim Wassell; Declan Doherty
- Home stadium: Jeffrey Field

2024 Big Ten Conference women's soccer standings
	Conf.						Overall
Team	W		L		T	PCT	W		L		T	PCT
No. 5 USC ‍†‍‍^{y}	10	–	0	–	1	.955	18	–	1	–	4	.870
No. 18 UCLA ‍‍‡‍^{y}	8	–	1	–	2	.818	17	–	4	–	3	.771
No. 12 Iowa ‍‍‍^{y}	8	–	2	–	1	.773	15	–	3	–	4	.773
No. 14 Michigan St ‍‍‍^{y}	7	–	1	–	3	.773	14	–	3	–	5	.750
Rutgers ‍‍‍^{y}	6	–	2	–	3	.682	11	–	5	–	5	.643
Washington ‍‍‍^{y}	7	–	4	–	0	.636	10	–	7	–	4	.571
No. 17 Minnesota ‍‍‍^{y}	6	–	3	–	2	.636	14	–	5	–	3	.705
No. 11 Ohio St ‍‍‍^{y}	6	–	3	–	2	.636	14	–	6	–	3	.674
No. 19 Wisconsin ‍‍‍^{y}	5	–	3	–	3	.591	10	–	6	–	4	.600
No. 8 Penn St ‍‍‍^{y}	5	–	4	–	2	.545	15	–	7	–	3	.660
Illinois ‍‍‍	4	–	6	–	1	.409	8	–	8	–	2	.500
Purdue ‍‍‍	3	–	7	–	1	.318	7	–	9	–	2	.444
Nebraska ‍‍‍	3	–	7	–	1	.318	6	–	10	–	1	.382
Michigan ‍‍‍	2	–	8	–	1	.227	3	–	13	–	2	.222
Northwestern ‍‍‍	1	–	8	–	2	.182	6	–	10	–	3	.395
Maryland ‍‍‍	1	–	8	–	2	.182	4	–	10	–	5	.342
Oregon ‍‍‍	1	–	8	–	2	.182	5	–	11	–	2	.333
Indiana ‍‍‍	1	–	9	–	1	.136	6	–	9	–	2	.412
† – Conference champion ‡ – 2024 Big Ten Tournament champion y – Invited to the NCAA Tournament; As of December 10, 2024; Rankings from United Soccer Coaches Poll; Source:Big Ten

The 2024 Penn State Nittany Lions women's soccer team represents Pennsylvania State University during the 2024 NCAA Division I women's soccer season and the 2024 Big Ten Conference women's soccer season. It is the program's 31st season fielding a women's varsity soccer team and their 31st season in the Big Ten Conference. The 2024 season is Erica Dambach's 18th year as head coach.

== Background ==
The 2024 season is the Nittany Lions' 31st as a varsity soccer program, and their 31st in the Big Ten Conference. The team is led by 18th-year head coach Erica Dambach, a former head coach for the Harvard program.

== Player movement ==
=== Recruiting class ===
Name	Nationality	Hometown	Club	TDS Rating
Nicole Crane; F	(United States)	Glen Rock, New Jersey	World Class FC	3/5 stars
Riley Cross; MF	(United States)	Chatham, New Jersey	PDA	4/5 stars
Emma Fassora; D	(United States)	Louisville, Colorado	Real Colorado	3/5 stars
Hannah Jordan; MF	(United States)	Texas	Solar Soccer Club	4/5 stars
Lily Phillips; MF	(United States)	Wilmington, Delaware	Penn Fusion SA	4/5 stars
Kennedy Ring; F	(United States)	New York	World Class FC	4/5 stars
Anna Babcock; F	(United States)	Sedro-Woolley, Washington	Crossfire Premier SC	4/5 stars
Emma Johnson; MF	(United States)	Indiana	Indy Eleven Pro Academy	4/5 stars
Elayna Kocher; F	(United States)	Allentown, Pennsylvania	Penn Fusion	4/5 stars
Paige Pasinski; MF	(United States)	Phoenix, Arizona	SC del Sol	4/5 stars
Marlee Raymond; D	(United States)	Cumming, Georgia	United Futbol Academy (GA)	4/5 stars
Olivia Robinson; F	(United States)	Scotch Plains, New Jersey	STA	3/5 stars
Lily Selvy; GK	(United States)	OFallon, Missouri	Lou Fusz Athletic	3/5 stars
Layla Tomezak; MF	(United States)	Michigan	Nationals	3/5 stars

== Preseason ==
=== Preseason Big Ten poll ===
Penn State was predicted to finish 2nd in the Big Ten Conference.

Coaches' Poll
Predicted finish	Team
1	UCLA
2	Penn State
3	Michigan State
4	Nebraska
5	USC
6	Wisconsin
7	Rutgers
8	Iowa
9	Ohio State
10	Indiana
11	Michigan
12	Northwestern
13	Washington
14	Minnesota
15	Illinois
16	Purdue
17	Maryland
18	Oregon

== Squad ==
=== Roster ===
As of 8 Sep 2024

Note: Flags indicate national team as defined under FIFA eligibility rules; some limited exceptions apply. Players may hold more than one non-FIFA nationality.

No.	Pos.	Nation	Player
00	GK	USA	Amanda Poorbaugh
1	GK	USA	Mackenzie Gress
2	MF	USA	Molly Martin
3	MF	USA	Olivia Damico
4	DF	USA	Kayleigh Herr
5	DF	USA	Keegan Schmeiser
6	GK	USA	Kealey Titmuss
7	FW	USA	Amelia White
8	FW	USA	Jolie Farmer
9	FW	USA	Nicollette Kiorpes
10	MF	USA	Olivia Borgen
11	MF	USA	Jordan Fusco
12	DF	USA	Bella Ayscue
14	FW	USA	Kaitlyn MacBean
15	MF	USA	Devon Olive

No.	Pos.	Nation	Player
16	FW	USA	Awbrey Culpa
17	MF	USA	Ava Minnier
18	DF	USA	Kaelyn Wolfe
19	MF	USA	Katie Scott
20	MF	USA	Natalie Magnotta
21	FW	USA	Frankee Flesher
22	MF	USA	Rowan Lapi
24	FW	USA	Elle Kershner
25	DF	GER	Mieke Schiemann
27	FW	IRL	Rebecca Cooke
28	DF	USA	Ginger Fontenot
26	DF	USA	Kara Ogden
30	FW	USA	Addison Hess
31	MF	USA	Julia Raich
32	MF	USA	Natalie Wilson

=== Personnel ===
Front office
Athletic Director	Pat Kraft
Coaching staff
Head Coach	Erica Dambach
Associate Head Coach	Ann Cook
Associate Head Coach	Tim Wassell
Assistant Coach	Declan Doherty
Director of Operations and Performance Leadership	Kara Cook
Support staff
Associate Director of Athletic Training Services	Andra Thomas
Assistant Director of Athletic Performance	Brianna Kanz

== Schedule ==
Date Time, TV	Rank^{#}	Opponent^{#}	Result	Record	Team events	Opponent events	Site (Attendance) City, State
Exhibition
August 8*; 1:00 PM		St. John's	––	––	––	––	Jeffrey Field; University Park, PA
Pre-season
August 15*; 7:00 PM, BTN		No. 8 Texas Tech	W 4-0	1-0-0	J. Fusco 7'; K. MacBean 17'; R. Lapi 25' (penalty); A. Kulpa 44'	None	Jeffrey Field (1275); University Park, PA
August 22*; 5:30 PM, BTN+		No. 21 Virginia	L 1-2	1-1-0	K. MacBean 15'; K. MacBean (yellow card) 40'; L. Evans (yellow card) 72'	M. Cagle 54'; M. Cagle 66'	Jeffrey Field (1603); University Park, PA
August 25*; 1:00 PM, BTN+		West Chester	W 5-0	2-1-0	L. Evans 7'; K. MacBean 22'; J. Fusco 36'; O. Smith 51'; R. Lapi 78'	None	Jeffrey Field (1283); University Park, PA
August 29*; 6:00 PM, BTN+		West Virginia	W 3-1	3-1-0	J. Fusco 5'; K. MacBean 32'; A. Kulpa 67'; J. Fusco (yellow card) 59'	S. Brown 43'	Jeffrey Field (1450); University Park, PA
September 1*; 7:30 PM, BTN+		at No. 19 Saint Louis	W 2-1	4-1-0	K. MacBean 3'; K. MacBean 13'	E. Le 47' (penalty)	Hermann Stadium (1759); St. Louis, MO
September 5*; 4:00 PM, BTN+		at Princeton	W 1-0	5-1-0	J. Fusco 34'	None	Myslik Field at Roberts Stadium (982); Princeton, NJ
September 8*; 1:00 PM, BTN+		at No. 23 Georgetown	T 0-0	5-1-1	K. MacBean (yellow card) 45'	None	Shaw Field (1241); Washington, DC
Regular season
September 12; 7:00 PM, BTN+		Michigan	W 6-0	6-1-1	L. Evans 11'; J. Fusco 28'; R. Lapi 36'; O. Smith 47'; K. MacBean 54'; J. Fusco 71'; O. Smith (yellow card) 33'	None	Jeffrey Field (1103); University Park, PA
September 15*; 1:00 PM, BTN+		Columbia	W 2-1	7-1-1	K. MacBean 15'; O. Smith 42'; K. MacBean (yellow card) 55'	L. Gonzalez 52'	Jeffrey Field (987); University Park, PA
September 19; 8:00 PM, BTN+		Northwestern	W 1-0	8-1-1	J. Fusco 67'	None	Jeffrey Field (1194); University Park, PA
September 22; 2:00 PM, BTN		No. 5 Michigan State	L 0-1	8-2-1	L. Evans (yellow card) 30'	A. Young 76'	Jeffrey Field (1389); University Park, PA
September 26; 6:30 PM, BTN+		at No. 18 Iowa	L 1-2	8-3-1	K. MacBean 54'	M. Carter 15'; R. King 63'	Iowa Soccer Complex (345); Iowa City, IA
September 29; 8:00 PM, BTN		at Nebraska	W 1-0	9-3-1	R. Lapi 77'	None	Hibner Stadium (821); Lincoln, NE
October 4; 7:00 PM, BTN+		Rutgers	T 1-1	9-3-2	J. Fusco 38'; J. Fusco (yellow card) 50'	E. Hansen 62'	Jeffrey Field (1284); University Park, PA
October 10; 6:00 PM, BTN+		at Maryland	W 5-0	10-3-2	K. MacBean 7'; J. Fusco 19'; O. Smith 33'; L. Evans 59'; A. Kulpa 66'	None	Ludwig Field (672); College Park, MD
October 13; 3:00 PM, BTN+		Minnesota	W 3-2	11-3-2	J. Fusco 21'; O. Smith 49'; K. MacBean 79'; O. Smith (yellow card) 53'	S. Davis 12'; T. Carter 44'	Jeffrey Field (1011); University Park, PA
October 17; 9:00 PM, BTN		at No. 10 UCLA	T 0-0	11-3-3	K. MacBean (yellow card) 45'	None	Wallis Annenberg Stadium (2043); Los Angeles, CA
October 20; 6:00 PM, BTN+		at No. 9 USC	L 1-2	11-4-3	K. MacBean 57'; L. Evans (yellow card) 61'	N. Gray 33'; C. Wilson 70'	Dignity Health Sports Park (2030); Carson, CA
October 27; 12:00 PM, BTN		at No. 21 Ohio State	L 1-4	11-5-3	K. MacBean 73'; E. Dambach (yellow card) 85'	J. Bonham 18'; S. Jones 61'; A. Poremba 74'; K. Dudukovich 85'; K. Dudukovich (yellow card) 90'	Jesse Owens Memorial Stadium (1122); Columbus, OH
Big Ten Tournament
November 1*; 7:30 PM, BTN+	(10) No. 22	at (7) Minnesota; First Round	W 1-0	12-5-3	M. Schiemann 88'; K. Herr (yellow card) 79'	K. Childers (yellow card) 88'	Elizabeth Lyle Robbie Stadium (462); Saint Paul, MN
November 4*; 3:00 PM, BTN	(10) No. 22	vs. (2) No. 9 UCLA; Quarterfinals	L 0-1	12-6-3	M. Martin (yellow card) 22'	N. Fraser 35'; B. Marin-Valencia (yellow card) 52'; J. Perry (yellow card) 86'	Elizabeth Lyle Robbie Stadium (215); Saint Paul, MN
NCAA Tournament
November 16*; 6:00 PM, ESPN+	(4) No. 22	Stony Brook; First Round	W 8-1	13-6-3	K. Macbean 8'; B. Ayscue 16'; J. Raich 36'; R. Cooke 41'; K. Scott 51'; R. Cooke 63'; A. Kulpa 87'; A. Kulpa 87'	L. Setteducate 57'	Jeffrey Field (693); State College, PA
November 22*; 2:00 PM, ESPN+	(4) No. 22	vs. (5) No. 7 TCU; Second Round	W 1-0	14-6-3	K. Macbean 46'	none	Seminole Soccer Complex; Tallahassee, FL
November 24*; 2:30 PM, ESPN+	(4) No. 22	vs. (8) Vanderbilt; Sweet 16	W 3-1	15-6-3	A. Kulpa 41'; N. Wilson 58'; R. Lapi 65'	C. Betts 7'	Seminole Soccer Complex; Tallahassee, FL
November 29*; 12:00 PM, ESPN+	(4) No. 22	vs. (2) No. 8 North Carolina; Elite 8	*	*	*	*	Dorrance Field; Chapel Hill, NC
*Non-conference game. ^{#}Rankings from United Soccer Coaches. (#) Tournament seedings in parentheses.

== Awards and honors ==
Recipient	Award	Date	Ref.
Jordan Fusco	TopDrawerSoccer National Team of the Week	August 20, 2024	
Kaitlyn MacBean	TopDrawerSoccer National Player of the Week	September 3, 2024	
Kaitlyn MacBean	Big Ten Offensive Player of the Week	September 3, 2024	
Mieke Schiemann	Big Ten Defensive Player of the Week	September 17, 2024	
Mackenzie Gress	Big Ten Goalkeeper of the Week	October 15, 2024	
Erica Dambach	Pennsylvania Sports Hall of Fame	October 24, 2024	
Kaitlyn MacBean	First-Team All-Big Ten	October 31, 2024	
Jordan Fusco	Second-Team All-Big Ten	October 31, 2024	
Mieke Schiemann	Second-Team All-Big Ten	October 31, 2024	
Devon Olive	Big Ten Sportsmanship Award	October 31, 2024	

== Rankings ==
Ranking movements Legend: ██ Increase in ranking ██ Decrease in ranking
	Week																
Poll	Pre	1	2	3	4	5	6	7	8	9	10	11	12	13	14	15	Final
United Soccer	4	3	12	8	12	9	15	19	20	16	15	22		Not released			
Top Drawer Soccer	Not released	7	5	7	5	10	9	11	16	14	9	11	14	11	12		
