= Sydney Jones (soccer) =

American soccer player (born 2002)

Personal information
- Full name: Sydney Sienna Jones
- Date of birth: October 24, 2002 (age 24)
- Height: 5 ft 4 in (1.63 m)
- Position: Defender

Team information
- Current team: HB Køge
- Number: 5

Youth career
- Cincinnati DA

College career
Years	Team	Apps	(Gls)
2021–2024	Ohio State Buckeyes	82	(4)

Senior career*
Years	Team	Apps	(Gls)
2025	Utah Royals	1	(0)
2025–2026	Kansas City Current II	0	(0)
2026–	HB Køge	0	(0)

International career
2020	United States U-18	2	(0)
- * Club domestic league appearances and goals as of April 18, 2025

Sydney Sienna Jones (born October 24, 2002) is an American professional soccer player who plays as a defender for Danish A-Liga club HB Køge. She played college soccer for the Ohio State Buckeyes. After a brief stint with the Utah Royals, she joined the Kansas City Current's reserve team before moving to the Current's sister club HB Køge in Denmark.

== Early life ==
Jones grew up in Cincinnati, the daughter of Sarah Cornella and Sid Jones. She began playing soccer at a young age alongside her future high school and college teammate Kailyn Dudukovich. She attended Lakota West High School, winning the Division I state championship in 2019. She committed to Ohio State as a freshman over offers from Duke, Penn State, and Tennessee. She played club soccer for Cincinnati Development Academy.

== College career ==
Jones started all 82 games for the Ohio State Buckeyes from 2021 to 2024. She joined the team during the spring of 2021, but redshirted the half-season held then due to the COVID-19 pandemic. She played every minute of her freshman season that fall, featuring mostly at center back out of necessity and earning Big Ten Conference all-freshman honors. In the last game of the regular season, she drew and scored a penalty which secured Ohio State's berth in the Big Ten tournament. In her sophomore season in 2022, she moved to her natural position of outside back and helped the Buckeyes win one round at the NCAA tournament. She played every minute of her junior season besides the opening game, earning second-team All-Big Ten honors. In her senior season in 2024, she earned third-team All-Big Ten honors and helped Ohio State reach the third round of the NCAA tournament, assisting on the team's first goal of the tournament.

== Club career ==
Jones joined the Utah Royals as a non-roster invitee in the National Women's Soccer League (NWSL) preseason in January 2025. On March 4, she signed her first professional contract with Utah on a short-term deal. On April 18, she made her professional debut as an 84th-minute substitute for Bianca St-Georges in a 1–0 victory over the Chicago Stars, her only appearance for the Royals. She was released by the club on May 2.

After leaving Utah, Jones joined the newly established Kansas City Current II reserve team. In December 2025, she played for the Kansas City Current at the World Sevens Football tournament. In January 2026, she joined the Current first team for preseason training along with Current II teammate Kayla Colbert.

On May 29, 2026, Jones signed with the Current's sister club HB Køge in Denmark.

== International career ==
Jones trained with the United States youth national team at the under-16, under-18, and under-20 levels, appearing in two friendlies with the under-18 team in 2020.

== Honors and awards ==
HB Køge

- A-Liga: 2025–26

Individual

- Second-team All-Big Ten: 2023
- Third-team All-Big Ten: 2024
- Big Ten all-freshman team: 2021
