= Concordia Lutheran High School (Texas) =

School in Tomball, Texas, United States

Location
- 700 East Main Street; Tomball, Harris County, Texas 77375; United States; 30.099861°N 95.606225°W

Information
- School type: Private Christian
- Religious affiliation: Lutheran
- Opened: 1984
- Principal: Julie Kangas
- Head of school: Todd Eklund
- Chaplain: Rev. Kyle Blake
- Key people: Julie Kangas (Principal); Jenny Honeck (Asst. Prin.); Andrew Schultz (Director of Operations)
- Grades: 9-12
- Enrollment: 565
- Average class size: 19.2
- Schedule: Modified Block
- Campus size: 42 acres
- Colors: Navy, silver, and white
- Slogan: Building Lives of Excellence Upon the Foundation of Christ
- Athletics: Texas Association of Private and Parochial Schools (TAPPS 6A)
- Athletics conference: District 4
- Sports: Fall Sports: Football, Volleyball, Cheer, Cross Country (Boys & Girls). Winter Sports: Basketball (Boys & Girls), Soccer (Boys & Girls), Swimming (Boys & Girls), Cheer. Spring Sports: Baseball, Softball, Track & Field (Boys & Girls), Lacrosse (Boys), Tennis (Boys & Girls), Golf (Boys & Girls).
- Mascot: Crusaders
- Team name: Crusaders
- Accreditation: Texas Private School Accreditation Commission, National Lutheran School Accreditation, Texas District LCMS
- USNWR ranking: Winners of TAPPS 6A Henderson Cup in 2018-2019 as Top Private School in Texas
- Tuition: General Students: $21,500 per year, Tuition assistance vehicles for a variety of needs
- Feeder schools: Epiphany Lutheran School, Salem Lutheran School, Trinity Lutheran School
- Website: www.clhs-tx.org

Concordia Lutheran High School is a private Christian high school located in Tomball, Texas, in Northwest Houston.

Children associated with local Lutheran churches are eligible to receive lower tuition rates.

Concordia is accredited by National Lutheran School Accreditation, the Lutheran School Accreditation Commission - Texas, and the Texas Private School Accreditation Commission. It is recognized by the Texas Education Agency.

== History ==
It had 515 students in the 2014–2015 school year, and 585 in the 2015–2016 school year; at that time the school's capacity was maxed out and it used portable classrooms to house some of the students. The school's head, Joel Bode, stated that expansion of Texas State Highway 249 resulted in an increase of enrollment. Bode stated that while he knew some Exxon employees began sending their children to the school after the company opened offices in northern Harris County, the school so far had not experienced "tremendous growth directly from Exxon" although businesses related to Exxon moving to northern Harris County may be indirectly impacting the school's enrollment.

An expansion began construction in late March 2015, and was scheduled for completion in March 2016. In addition to classroom space this wing was to have classrooms, an art room, a green room, and four science laboratories. As of January 2017 the school had about 600 students. Around that month a 13 classroom wing was completed for $5.9 million, expanding the school's capacity.

== Campuses ==
The school has two campuses, a main campus and a south campus. The south campus has 8 acres (3.2 ha) of open land, but is mainly used as a parking lot for students and a place to house various sports fields.

The new education wing completed in 2017 features new classrooms including 4 double science labs, 7 multipurpose classrooms, a multimedia green room and production studio and a commons area for group events and banquets.

== Notable alumni ==
- Shane Baz, baseball pitcher
- Ke'Bryan Hayes, baseball third baseman
- Maile Hayes, soccer player
- Brynn King, pole vaulter
- Adam Oller, baseball pitcher
- Glenn Otto, baseball pitcher
