= Mia Hamant =

American soccer player (2004–2025)

Personal information
- Date of birth: July 30, 2004
- Place of birth: San Francisco, California, United States
- Date of death: November 6, 2025 (aged 21)
- Height: 5 ft 10 in (1.78 m)
- Position: Goalkeeper

Youth career
- Marin FC
- 2018–2022: Redwood Giants

College career
Years	Team	Apps	(Gls)
2022–2025	Washington Huskies	18	(0)

Mia Hamant (July 30, 2004 – November 6, 2025) was an American college soccer player who played as a goalkeeper for the Washington Huskies.

== Early life ==
Raised in Corte Madera, California, Hamant led Marin FC to two NorCal State Cup titles. She graduated from Redwood High School, where she "was named All-League First Team for three years and selected as team MVP her senior year" in soccer and also played third base on the softball team.

== College career ==
Hamant was a goalkeeper on the Washington Huskies women's soccer team at the University of Washington. An anterior cruciate ligament injury forced her to redshirt her first year of eligibility. In the 2024 season, she "was one of the Big Ten's best goalkeepers", ranking third nationally with a 0.882 save percentage. She was named to the Big Ten All-Tournament team for 2024 and received CSC Academic All-District honors. She was scheduled to be a debut member of West Seattle Rhodies FC in the USL W League.

== Illness and death ==
Hamant was diagnosed with stage 4 SMARCB1-deficient kidney cancer in April 2025, "only the 14th documented case". She was forced to miss her senior soccer season, although the Big Ten awarded her the 2025 postseason Sportsmanship Award. The Rhodies dedicated their kit to her, and $10 from each sale went to a GoFundMe to support her treatment. She died from the disease on November 6, 2025, at the age of 21. In 2026, the Big Ten Conference Goalkeeper of the Year award was renamed in honor of Hamant.
