= Katie Scott (soccer) =

American soccer player (born 2007)

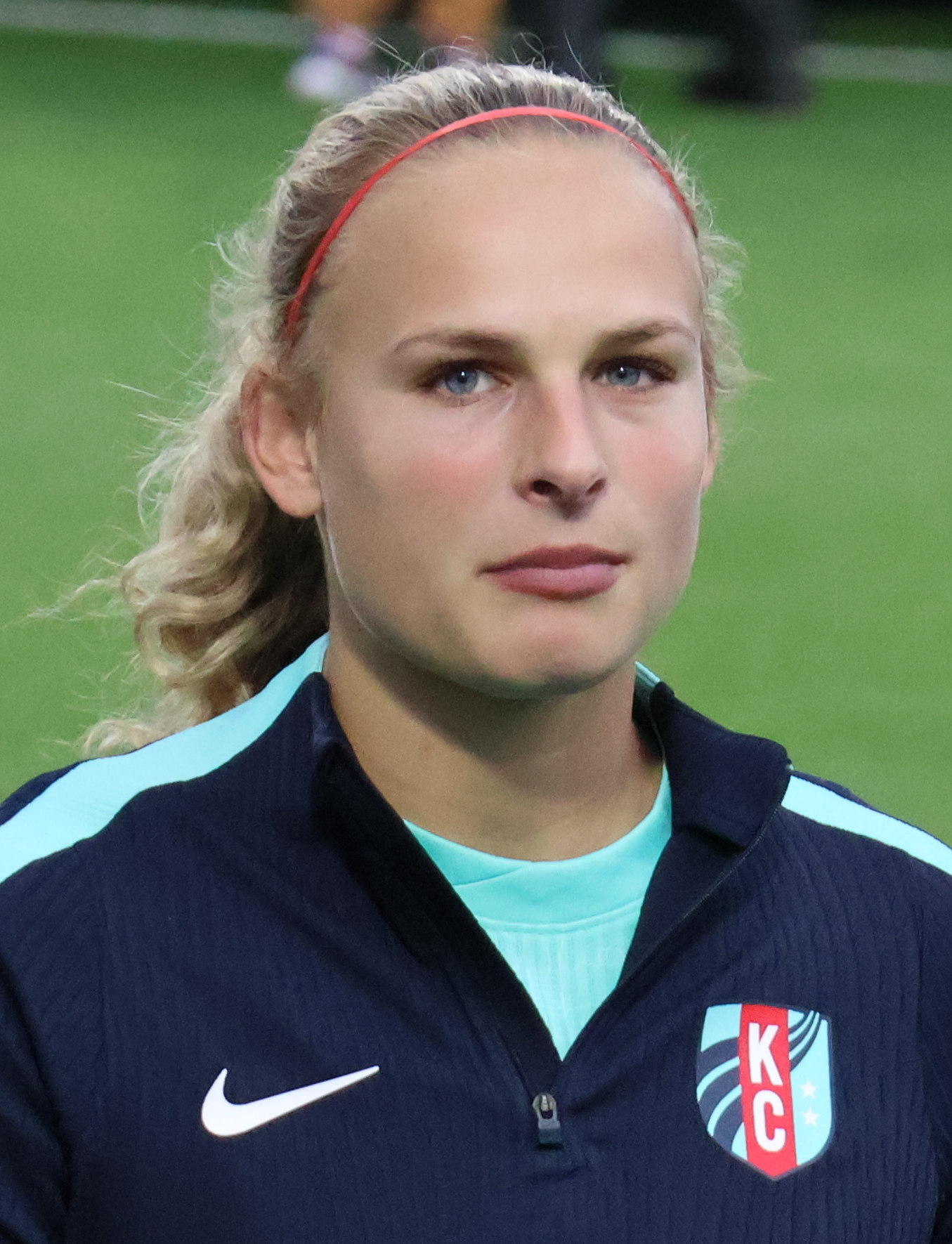
- Scott with the Kansas City Current in 2026

Personal information
- Full name: Katharine Lillian Scott
- Date of birth: June 20, 2007 (age 19)
- Height: 5 ft 3 in (1.60 m)
- Positions: Right back; defensive midfielder

Team information
- Current team: Kansas City Current
- Number: 31

Youth career
- Internationals SC

College career
Years	Team	Apps	(Gls)
2024	Penn State Nittany Lions	11	(2)

Senior career*
Years	Team	Apps	(Gls)
2025–	Kansas City Current	14	(0)
2025	→ Racing Louisville (loan)	0	(0)

International career^{‡}
2022	United States U-15		
2023	United States U-16	1	(1)
2024	United States U-17	13	(1)
2025–	United States U-20	14	(1)
Medal record
Women's soccer
FIFA U-17 Women's World Cup
Bronze medal – third place	Dominican Republic 2024
- * Club domestic league appearances and goals as of August 29, 2026 ‡ National team caps and goals as of September 16, 2026

Katharine Lillian Scott (born June 20, 2007) is an American professional soccer player who plays as a right back or midfielder for the Kansas City Current of the National Women's Soccer League (NWSL). She played college soccer for the Penn State Nittany Lions for one season. She won bronze with the United States at the 2024 FIFA U-17 Women's World Cup.

== Early life and college career ==
Scott was raised in Fairview, Pennsylvania, the only daughter of Karen and Nick Scott, and has three older brothers. She comes from a family of many Penn State alumni, including her parents who played for the men's soccer and women's gymnastics teams. Scott played club soccer as a right winger or center forward for Internationals SC, the nearest ECNL team despite being two hours away in Ohio, where she was a three-time ECNL All-American and two-time United Soccer Coaches All-American. She attended Fairview High School, where she played for the basketball team but not the soccer team. She committed to Penn State over offers from other top programs like North Carolina and Virginia and graduated from high school one year early to start college at the age of 17.

=== Penn State Nittany Lions ===
At age 17, Scott played for the Penn State Nittany Lions in the 2024 season. She had 2 goals and 2 assists in 11 appearances (4 starts), dealing with injury early in the season and missing about a month while at the 2024 FIFA U-17 Women's World Cup. She scored both goals and made all four starts during the NCAA tournament, helping Penn State reach the quarterfinals, where she scored in a 2–1 loss to eventual champions North Carolina. After one season, she chose to turn professional and forgo her remaining college eligibility.

== Club career ==
The Kansas City Current announced on January 8, 2025, that the club had signed Scott to her first professional contract on a one-year deal. In July, she made her debut in the Teal Rising Cup exhibition tournament, starting both matches.

On August 7, 2025, the Current announced that Scott would join Racing Louisville on loan until the end of the season, using the NWSL's newly introduced intraleague loan mechanism. On September 12, she was recalled without having made any appearances for Louisville.

On September 26, 2025, after the Current clinched the NWSL Shield, Scott made her NWSL debut with the start in a 4–1 win over the Chicago Stars. On December 3, she signed a two-year contract extension with the Current.

== International career ==
Scott was called into the United States national under-15 team by head coach Katie Schoepfer at the start of 2022. Despite being a natural forward for club, she established her place on the youth national team by showing versatility and moving to defensive midfielder or outside back. She helped lead the United States to victory at the 2022 CONCACAF Girls' U-15 Championship, captaining the squad in the semifinals against the Dominican Republic and appearing off the bench in the final against Canada. Two years later, Scott started for the United States as they defeated Mexico in the final of the 2024 CONCACAF Women's U-17 Championship. She appeared in all 6 games (4 starts) at the 2024 FIFA U-17 Women's World Cup, helping the United States place third, its best result since 2008.

Scott was part of the under-20 roster at the 2026 FIFA U-20 Women's World Cup in Poland, making three appearances and one start, as they lost to Brazil on penalties in the round of 16.

== Honors ==
Kansas City Current

- NWSL Championship: 2026
- NWSL Shield: 2025

United States U-17

- CONCACAF Women's U-17 Championship: 2024
- FIFA U-17 Women's World Cup bronze medal: 2024
