= Aaliyah Farmer =

Mexican footballer (born 2003)

- Farmer in 2026

Personal information
- Full name: Aaliyah Shiria Farmer
- Date of birth: 27 October 2003 (age 23)
- Height: 1.75 m (5 ft 9 in)
- Positions: Center back; defensive midfielder

Team information
- Current team: Chicago Stars
- Number: 25

College career
Years	Team	Apps	(Gls)
2021–2024	USC Trojans	80	(9)

Senior career*
Years	Team	Apps	(Gls)
2025–2026	Tigres UANL	26	(3)
2026–	Chicago Stars	23	(0)

International career^{‡}
2025–	Mexico	5	(1)
- * Club domestic league appearances and goals as of 05:37, 2 November 2026 (UTC) ‡ National team caps and goals as of 23 October 2025

Aaliyah Shiria Farmer (born 27 October 2003) is a professional footballer who plays as a defender or midfielder for Chicago Stars FC of the National Women's Soccer League (NWSL). Born in the United States, she plays for the Mexico national team. She played college soccer for the USC Trojans and began her professional career with Tigres UANL in 2025. With Tigres, she won the 2025 Apertura title.

== Early life ==
Farmer grew up in Tustin, California, with three sisters. She is of Mexican descent on her mother's side and African American on her father's side. She attended Villa Park High School in Villa Park, California, where she starred on the soccer team, being named the Orange County Register Player of the Year in 2021, and played volleyball for one season. She played club soccer for Slammers FC, earning ECNL All-American and Conference Player of the Year honors at the U16 level in 2019. She was ranked by TopDrawerSoccer as the 17th-best player of the 2021 class, part of USC's fourth-ranked recruiting class.

== College career ==
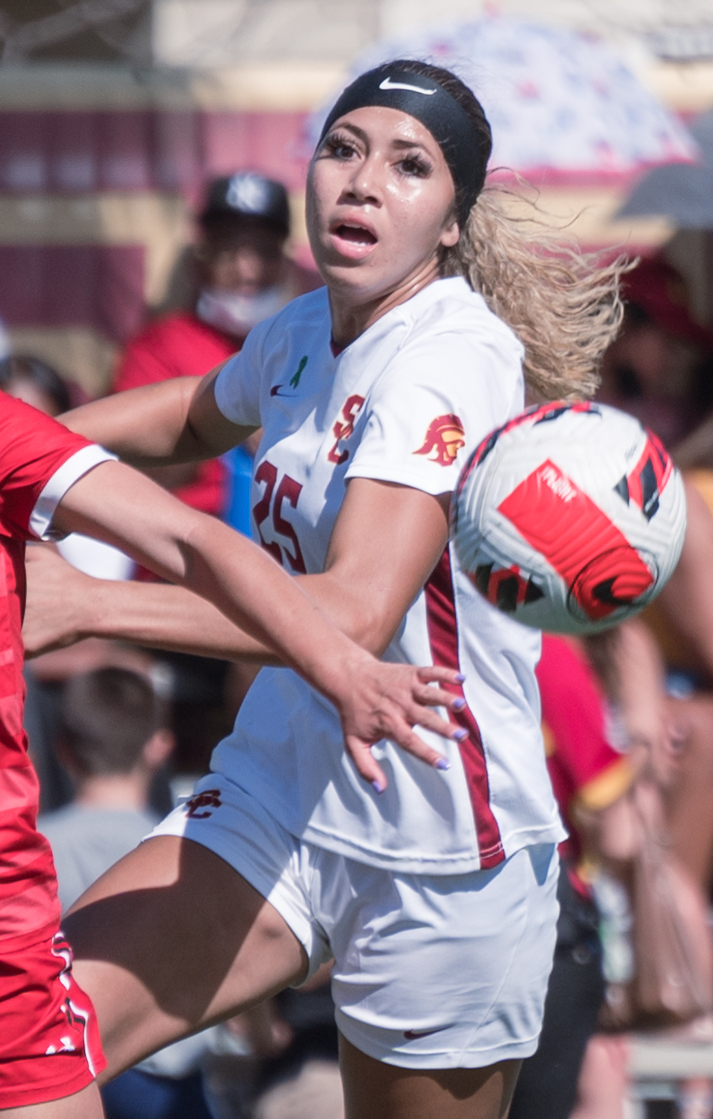
Farmer with USC in 2021

Farmer played four seasons for the USC Trojans, making 80 appearances (63 starts) and recording 9 goals and 9 assists. In her senior year in 2024, she helped lead the Trojans to the Big Ten Conference regular-season title in their first season in the conference. USC earned a program first one seed in the NCAA tournament, reaching the quarterfinals.

== Club career ==
=== Tigres UANL ===
On 14 January 2025, Liga MX Femenil club Tigres UANL announced that they had signed Farmer to her first professional contract. She made her professional debut two days later as a substitute in a 2–1 loss to Atlas. On 21 May, she scored her first professional goal in the CONCACAF W Champions Cup semifinals against the Portland Thorns, opening a 2–0 victory at the Estadio Universitario. She started in the final three days later as Tigres lost 1–0 to Gotham FC. On 12 September, she scored her first league goal in a 5–1 win over Pumas. She was a starter as Tigres won their record seventh league title in the 2025 Apertura, defeating Club América in the final 4–3 on aggregate. She left the club after a year, with head coach Pedro Losa commenting that she had requested a transfer due to harassment in Mexico.

=== Chicago Stars ===
On 3 February 2026, Farmer transferred to the NWSL's Chicago Stars FC, signing a three-year contract. She made her NWSL debut as a late substitute for Maitane López in a 4–0 loss to Angel City FC in the season opener on 15 March. On 25 April, she recorded her first start for the Stars, helping Chicago earn a home victory over NWSL expansion team Boston Legacy FC.

== International career ==
Mexico head coach Pedro López gave Farmer her first international call-up for the Pinatar Cup in February 2025, but she was unable to feature due to injury. She made her international debut on May 30, starting and playing the full 90 minutes in a 2–2 friendly draw against Uruguay. She scored her first international goal in a 1–0 friendly win over New Zealand on October 23.

== International goals ==
No.	Date	Venue	Opponent	Score	Result	Competition
1.	23 October 2025	Estadio Ciudad de los Deportes, Mexico City, Mexico	New Zealand	1–0	1–0	Friendly

== Honors and awards ==
USC Trojans

- Big Ten Conference: 2024

Tigres UANL

- Liga MX Femenil: 2025 Apertura

Individual

- Pac-12 Conference all-freshman team: 2021
- Big Ten tournament all-tournament team: 2024
