= Kailyn Dudukovich =

American soccer player (born 2002)

Personal information
- Full name: Kailyn Michelle Dudukovich
- Date of birth: November 16, 2002 (age 23)
- Height: 5 ft 11 in (1.80 m)
- Position: Forward

Team information
- Current team: Braga

College career
| Years | Team | Apps | (Gls) |
| 2021–2024 | Ohio State Buckeyes | 82 | (44) |

Senior career*
| Years | Team | Apps | (Gls) |
| 2025– | Braga | 6 | (0) |

International career
| 2018 | United States U-16 | | |
- * Club domestic league appearances and goals as of January 10, 2026

Kailyn Michelle Dudukovich (born November 16, 2002) is an American professional soccer player who plays as a forward for Campeonato Nacional Feminino club Braga. She played college soccer for the Ohio State Buckeyes, setting the program record for career goals and earning first-team All-American honors in 2024.

== Early life ==
Dudukovich grew up in West Chester, Ohio, one of three children born to Dan and Debbie Dudukovich. Her parents both played college basketball at Butler University, and her brother Nathan plays basketball for IU Indy. Dudukovich began playing soccer alongside her future high school and college teammate Sydney Jones at an early age. She played club soccer for Cincinnati Development Academy (previously Cincinnati United) and Ohio Elite.

Dudukovich committed to Ohio State over offers from Notre Dame, Duke, Michigan, Penn State, and others when she was a freshman. She played basketball at Lakota West High School before joining the soccer team as a junior in 2019. In her junior season, she scored 50 goals in 24 games as she led Lakota West to the Division I state championship. She braced in the final with her second goal coming in the closing seconds of the 2–1 victory. She was named Ohio's Ms. Soccer, the Ohio Gatorade Player of the Year, and United Soccer Coaches All-American. She followed that up with 46 goals in her senior season as Lakota West reached the regional final. TopDrawerSoccer rated Dudukovich the eight-best recruit of the 2021 class.

== College career ==
Dudukovich led the Ohio State Buckeyes with 7 goals in her freshman season in 2021, being named to the Big Ten Conference all-freshman team and third-team All-Big Ten. She repeated her total of 7 goals in her sophomore season in 2022, including a hat trick against Maryland with the help of two penalties. She scored a team-high 11 goals and dished a career-high 5 assists in her junior season in 2023, earning second-team All-Big Ten honors. In her senior season in 2024, she came within one goal of Ohio State's single-season scoring record, finishing with 19 goals, while she also broke Tiffany Cameron's 40-goal program career record with 44 herself in 82 appearances. In the postseason, she scored the winning goal in the first round of the Big Ten tournament and scored two times as Ohio State reached the third round of the NCAA tournament. She was named first-team All-Big Ten and first-team All-American.

== Club career ==
Portuguese club Braga announced on July 10, 2025, that they had signed Dudukovich to her first professional contract on a one-year deal. She made her professional debut on August 27, as a late substitute in a 3–1 win against Valur in the UEFA Women's Champions League second qualifying round. On October 12, she earned her first professional assist in a 5–2 victory over Torreense, Braga's first league win of the season. On November 23, she made her first start and scored her first professional goals – four of them – in a 10–0 rout of UDS Roriz in the Taça da Liga Feminina.

== International career ==
Dudukovich trained with the United States youth national team at the u-14 and under-16 levels from 2016 to 2018. She helped lead the United States to victory at the Tournament of Nations (Torneo delle Nazioni) in Gradisca d'Isonzo, Italy, in 2018, scoring four goals in an 8–0 win against Iran.

== Honors and awards ==
Individual

- First-team All-American: 2024
- First-team All-Big Ten: 2024
- Second-team All-Big Ten: 2023
- Third-team All-Big Ten: 2021
- Big Ten all-freshman team: 2021
