= Brynn King =

American athlete (born 2000)

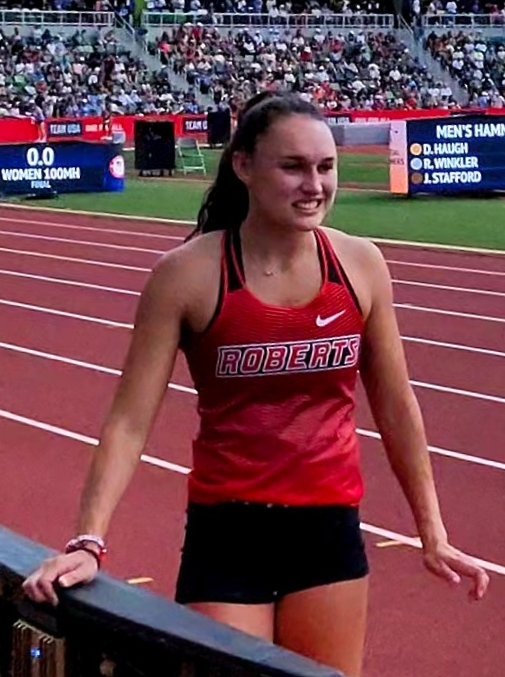
- King in 2024

Personal information
- Full name: Brynn Taylor King
- Nationality: American
- Born: August 22, 2000 (age 25)
- Home town: The Woodlands, Texas, U.S.
- Height: 5 ft 8 in (173 cm)

Sport
- Sport: Athletics
- Event: Pole Vault

Achievements and titles
- Personal bests: Pole Vault: 4.75m (Austin, 2025)

Brynn Taylor King (born August 22, 2000) is an American pole vaulter.

== Early life ==
King is from The Woodlands, Texas and attended Concordia Lutheran High School in Tomball. She ran track and was a flyer in her cheerleading team prior to starting pole vault in her senior year of high school. She attended Duke University and later transferred to Roberts Wesleyan University in Rochester, New York.

== Career ==
King is coached by Jenn Suhr. In February 2024, she set a new personal best of 4.61 metres in Allendale, Michigan. In 2024, she was the NCAA Division II indoor and outdoor champion in the pole vault. To win the indoor title she cleared a personal best height of 4.65 metres, becoming the fifth best all-time collegiate indoor competitor. She won the Division II outdoors title in May 2024 with a height of 4.60 metres.

King competed at the 2024 United States Olympic trials in Eugene, Oregon in June 2024 and cleared a personal best height of 4.73 metres to finish third overall, with the minimum standard for the 2024 Paris Olympics. She subsequently competed in the pole vault at the 2024 Paris Olympics.

In 2025 at the Texas Relays, she set the all-time collegiate outdoor record with a jump of 4.75 m.

In June 2026, she won the pole vault at the Josef Odložil Memorial in Prague.
