= Kaitlyn MacBean =

American soccer player (born 2001)

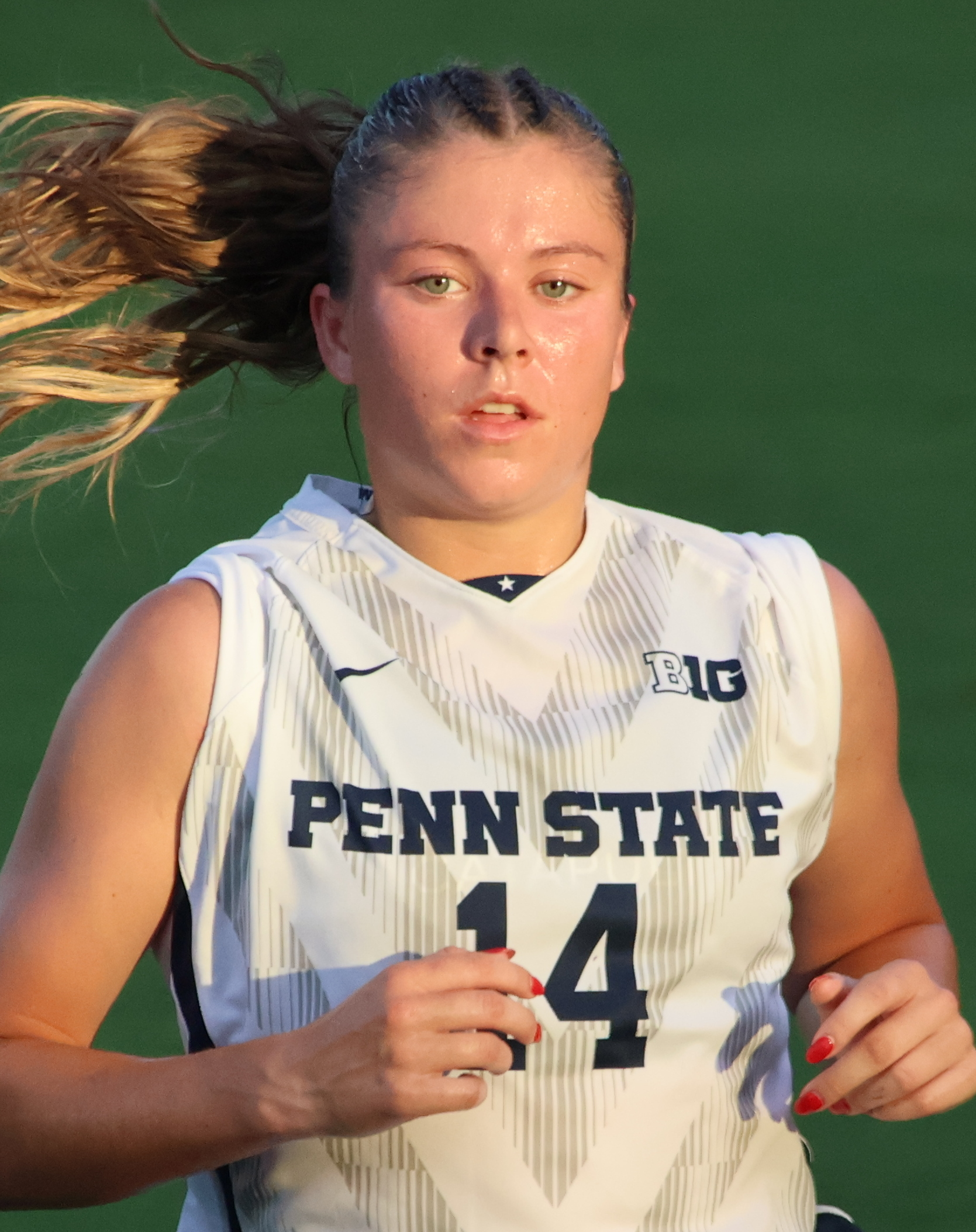
- MacBean with Penn State in 2025

Personal information
- Date of birth: September 5, 2001 (age 25)
- Place of birth: Minneapolis, Minnesota, U.S.
- Height: 5 ft 9 in (1.75 m)
- Position: Forward

Team information
- Current team: IFK Norrköping
- Number: 14

Youth career
- Minnesota Thunder

College career
Years	Team	Apps	(Gls)
2021–2025	Penn State Nittany Lions	88	(39)

Senior career*
Years	Team	Apps	(Gls)
2026–	IFK Norrköping	1	(0)
- * Club domestic league appearances and goals as of March 28, 2026

Kaitlyn MacBean (born September 5, 2001) is an American professional soccer player who plays as a forward for Damallsvenskan club IFK Norrköping. She played college soccer for the Penn State Nittany Lions, earning All-American honors twice.

== Early life ==
MacBean was born in Minneapolis, Minnesota, the daughter of Bridget and Craig MacBean, and has two brothers. She grew up in Excelsior, Minnesota, and played club soccer for Minnesota Thunder Academy, earning ECNL all-conference honors twice. She attended Breck School, where she was a four-time all-state selection in soccer, was named Ms. Soccer Minnesota in 2019, and also won a state track title in the 4 × 100 meters relay. She committed to play college soccer at Pennsylvania State University before her sophomore year.

== College career ==
MacBean took medical redshirts in her first two seasons with the Penn State Nittany Lions while recovering from an anterior cruciate ligament injury. She made her college debut in the 2022 season, playing in 19 games as a substitute and scoring 3 goals, and was named in the Big Ten Conference all-freshman team. In the 2022 Big Ten tournament final, she scored once and Ally Schlegel scored twice in the victory over Michigan State. She became a starter during her redshirt junior season in 2023, jointly leading the team with 10 goals and adding 6 assists in 23 games, and was named third-team All-Big Ten. She scored four goals in the 2023 NCAA tournament as she helped the Nittany Lions to their first quarterfinal appearance in five years.

MacBean carried a scoring streak into her redshirt senior season in 2024, which stretched to eight games including a hat trick against West Virginia. She finished the season with a career-high 16 goals in 25 games, the most by a Nittany Lion since Maya Hayes in 2013, and was named first-team All-Big Ten and fourth-team All-American. In the 2024 NCAA tournament, she scored twice and again helped the team to the quarterfinals. After undergoing surgery after the season, she opted to return for a sixth and final season as a graduate student in 2025, writing on social media: "I'm back". She scored 10 goals in 21 games in 2025, earning first-team All-Big Ten and fourth-team All-American honors for the second time.

== Club career ==
MacBean trained with National Women's Soccer League (NWSL) expansion team Denver Summit FC as a non-roster trialist in the preseason in January 2026. The following month, she signed her first professional contract with Swedish club IFK Norrköping.

== Honors and awards ==
Penn State Nittany Lions

- Big Ten women's soccer tournament: 2022

Individual

- Fourth-team All-American: 2024, 2025
- First-team All-Big Ten: 2024, 2025
- Third-team All-Big Ten: 2023
- Big Ten all-freshman team: 2022
