= Maile Hayes =

American soccer player (born 2003)

Personal information
- Full name: Maile Joy Hayes
- Date of birth: September 9, 2003 (age 23)
- Height: 5 ft 7 in (1.70 m)
- Position: Forward

Team information
- Current team: Torreense
- Number: 6

Youth career
- 2011–2021: Challenge SC

College career
Years	Team	Apps	(Gls)
2021–2023	Texas A&M Aggies	58	(21)
2024	USC Trojans	23	(11)

Senior career*
Years	Team	Apps	(Gls)
2025–	Torreense	28	(8)
- * Club domestic league appearances and goals as of September 13, 2026

Maile Joy Hayes (born September 9, 2003) is an American professional soccer player who plays as a forward for Campeonato Nacional Feminino club Torreense. She played college soccer for the Texas A&M Aggies and the USC Trojans. She began her professional career with Torreense in 2025, helping lead them to their first three trophies in club history.

== Early life ==
Hayes grew up in The Woodlands, Texas, outside of Houston. She attended Concordia Lutheran High School in Tomball, Texas, for one year before transferring to Klein Oak High School in Klein, Texas. She played high school soccer for two seasons, being named district MVP and first-team all-state as a sophomore in 2019. She joined Challenge SC from Southwest United SC when she was nine, earning ECNL Conference Player of the Year honors in 2017. She committed to play college soccer for the Texas A&M Aggies as a freshman.

== College career ==
Hayes played three seasons for the Texas A&M Aggies, scoring 21 goals and adding 13 assists in 58 games. She was named to the Southeastern Conference (SEC) all-freshman team and TopDrawerSoccer's top 100 freshmen list after leading the Aggies in scoring with 7 goals in 2021. She was named first-team All-SEC as a sophomore after again leading the team with 10 goals in 2022, including the lone goal for the team in their first-round NCAA tournament loss to Texas. She reached the SEC tournament semifinals and the NCAA tournament second round while scoring 4 goals as a junior in 2023.

After completing her bachelor's degree in three years and wanting to challenge herself after a less productive junior year, Hayes transferred to the USC Trojans for her fourth and final season in 2024. She returned to form and led the Trojans in scoring with 11 goals and 5 assists in 23 games, earning first-team All-Big Ten honors. She helped the Trojans win the Big Ten regular-season championship, scoring the title-clinching goal against UCLA, and earn a one seed in the NCAA tournament. She scored three goals in USC's run to the NCAA tournament quarterfinals.

== Club career ==
Portuguese club Torreense announced on January 12, 2025, they had signed Hayes to her first professional contract. She made her professional debut against Sporting CP on February 18, coming off the bench to score the 2–1 winner in stoppage time. She went on to help Torreense win their first-ever trophy – the Taça de Portugal Feminina – opening the scoring against Braga in the semifinals on April 19, and starting in the 2–1 victory over league champions Benfica in the final on May 17. She finished the 2024–25 season with 4 goals in 11 games in all competitions and re-signed with Torreense for the following season.

On September 7, 2025, Hayes began the 2025–26 season in the Supertaça de Portugal Feminina, putting on a title-winning player of the match performance in a 2–1 victory over Benfica. Two weeks later, she scored her first goal of the season in a 4–2 win over Marítimo. On March 28, 2026, she led Torreense to their third trophy in under a year – the Taça da Liga Feminina – earning player of the match after a 1–0 win over Valadares Gaia in the final. She finished the season with 3 goals in 25 appearances and was integral as Torreense placed an impressive third in the league, securing the club's continental debut. She again re-signed with the club after the season.

On August 5, 2026, Hayes and Torreense made their continental debuts in a 2–1 loss to Juventus in the second qualifying round of the UEFA Women's Champions League. She scored her first continental goal three days later in a 5–2 third-place playoff win against Apolonia Fier. On September 27, she scored her first professional hat trick in an 8–0 win over Marítimo.

== Honors and awards ==
USC Trojans

- Big Ten Conference: 2024

Torreense

- Taça de Portugal Feminina: 2024–25
- Taça da Liga Feminina: 2025–26
- Supertaça de Portugal Feminina: 2025

Individual

- Record Campeonato Nacional Feminino Best XI: 2025–26
- First-team All-Big Ten: 2024
- First-team All-SEC: 2023
- SEC all-freshman team: 2021
