= 2024 NCAA Division I women's soccer tournament =

2024 NCAA women's soccer tournament
Women's College Cup (Semifinals & Final)

Tournament details
- Country: United States
- Dates: November 15 – December 9, 2024
- Teams: 64

Final positions
- Champions: (2) North Carolina (22nd title)
- Runners-up: (2) Wake Forest
- Semifinalists: (1) Duke; (3) Stanford

Tournament statistics
- Matches played: 63
- Goals scored: 213 (3.38 per match)
- Attendance: 100,766 (1,599 per match)
- Top goal scorer(s): (Canada) Holly Ward, Texas (5 goals)

Awards
- Most Outstanding Player: Olivia Thomas (Offensive); Clare Gagne (Defensive)
- All statistics correct as of 12/10/2024.

The 2024 NCAA Division I women's soccer tournament was the 43rd edition of the NCAA Division I women's soccer tournament, a postseason tournament to determine the national champion of NCAA Division I women's college soccer. The College Cup was played on December 6 and December 9 at WakeMed Soccer Park in Cary, North Carolina, and televised on ESPNU.

Florida State were the defending national champion. Florida State was awarded a first seed but was unable to defend their title falling to Vanderbilt in penalties in the Second Round.

Four teams from the Atlantic Coast Conference (ACC) qualified for the college cup, and North Carolina prevailed, claiming their twenty-second college cup.

== Qualification ==
All Division I women's soccer programs were eligible to qualify for the tournament. 29 teams received automatic bids by winning their conference tournaments, 1 team received an automatic bid by claiming the conference regular season crown (West Coast Conference doesn't hold a conference tournament), and an additional 34 teams earned at-large bids based on their regular season records.

Automatic bids
Conference	Team	Date qualified	Record	Appearance	Last bid
American	East Carolina	November 10	10–3–7	1st	None
America East	Maine	November 10	13–1–3	2nd	2023
ACC	Florida State	November 10	14–2–3	25th	2023
Atlantic 10	Saint Louis	November 10	13–4–4	9th	2023
ASUN	Lipscomb	November 10	14–1–6	4th	2021
Big East	UConn	November 10	13–4–4	32nd	2016
Big Sky	Sacramento State	November 10	5–6–9	3rd	2010
Big South	USC Upstate	November 10	10–4–4	1st	None
Big Ten	UCLA	November 10	16–3–3	28th	2023
Big 12	Kansas	November 9	13–5–4	10th	2019
Big West	UC Santa Barbara	November 10	8–5–9	10th	2009
CAA	Stony Brook	November 9	14–3–3	5th	2020
C-USA	FIU	November 10	13–4–2	3rd	2011
Horizon	Milwaukee	November 9	12–6–2	18th	2023
Ivy	Princeton	November 10	14–4–0	16th	2023
MAAC	Fairfield	November 10	18–2–1	6th	2008
MAC	Western Michigan	November 10	13–1–6	4th	2015
Missouri Valley	Missouri State	November 10	13–4–3	4th	2022
Mountain West	Utah State	November 9	18–1–4	4th	2023
Northeast	Howard	November 10	11–4–5	3rd	2018
Ohio Valley	Morehead State	November 10	9–7–6	5th	2023
Patriot	Boston University	November 10	6–7–7	15th	2018
SEC	Texas	November 10	16–3–2	18th	2023
SoCon	Samford	November 10	11–6–3	8th	2022
Southland	Stephen F. Austin	November 10	14–3–2	4th	2012
Summit League	South Dakota State	November 10	15–4–2	8th	2023
Sun Belt	James Madison	November 9	12–3–5	13th	2023
SWAC	Southern	November 10	9–9–2	1st	None
WAC	California Baptist	November 9	10–6–3	1st	None
West Coast	Santa Clara	November 9	12–3–4	34th	2023

At-Large Bids
Conference	Team	Record	Appearance	Last bid
ACC	California	12–5–2	28th	2022
ACC	Duke	14–2–1	29th	2022
ACC	North Carolina	16–5–0	43rd	2023
ACC	Notre Dame	11–3–4	30th	2023
ACC	Stanford	13–4–1	33rd	2023
ACC	Virginia	12–5–0	36th	2022
ACC	Virginia Tech	11–5–3	13th	2022
ACC	Wake Forest	12–3–3	23rd	2022
Big East	Georgetown	13–3–2	15th	2023
Big Ten	Iowa	13–2–4	5th	2023
Big Ten	Michigan State	12–2–5	7th	2023
Big Ten	Minnesota	12–4–3	12th	2018
Big Ten	Ohio State	12–5–3	18th	2023
Big Ten	Penn State	12–6–3	30th	2023
Big Ten	Rutgers	11–4–5	19th	2023
Big Ten	USC	15–1–3	23rd	2023
Big Ten	Washington	10–6–3	16th	2020
Big Ten	Wisconsin	9–5–4	25th	2023
Big 12	BYU	9–6–5	25th	2023
Big 12	Colorado	11–4–5	14th	2023
Big 12	Oklahoma State	14–4–3	14th	2020
Big 12	TCU	16–3–2	8th	2021
Big 12	Texas Tech	14–4–2	9th	2023
Big 12	West Virginia	12–5–2	23rd	2020
SEC	Arkansas	14–2–2	11th	2023
SEC	Auburn	12–3–4	18th	2021
SEC	Georgia	8–6–6	12th	2023
SEC	Kentucky	11–4–4	12th	2014
SEC	Mississippi State	17–2–0	4th	2023
SEC	LSU	9–8–3	10th	2023
SEC	South Carolina	10–3–7	18th	2023
SEC	Tennessee	9–6–4	16th	2023
SEC	Vanderbilt	9–3–6	13th	2022
West Coast	Pepperdine	12–3–5	14th	2023

== Bracket ==
The bracket was announced on Monday, November 11, 2024. First round games are played on November 15, 16, and 17 at the campus site of the seeded team.

=== Duke Bracket ===
First round Campus Sites
1	Duke*	8
Howard	0
LSU	1
8	Texas Tech*	2
5	Michigan State*	3
Western Michigan	1
Boston University	1
4	Texas*	4
3	Iowa*	2
Missouri State	1
Fairfield	0
6	Georgetown*	3
7	Virginia Tech*	2
Tennessee	1
California Baptist	1
2	UCLA* (a.e.t.)	2

Second round Regional Campus Sites
1	Duke*	3
8	Texas Tech	0
5	Michigan State (a.e.t.)	3
4	Texas	2
3	Iowa	1
6	Georgetown	0
7	Virginia Tech	2
2	UCLA*	1

Round of 16; Regional Campus Sites
1	Duke*	2
5	Michigan State	0
3	Iowa	0
7	Virginia Tech	1

Quarterfinal; Campus Sites
1	Duke*	1
7	Virginia Tech	0

* Host institution

==== Schedule ====
===== First round =====
November 15	Howard	0–8	#1 Duke	Durham, NC
6:00 p.m. EST		Report	19', 27', 56', 61' Mia Minestrella; 48', 54' Maggie Graham; 70' Mary Long; 82' Sophia Recupero	Stadium: Koskinen Stadium; Attendance: 1,082; Referee: Brandon Marion; Assistant referees: Robert Dail; Raymond Thomas; Fourth official: Clive Edwards

November 15	Boston University	1–4	#4 Texas	Austin, TX
6:00 p.m. CST	Morgan Fagan 20'	Report	29', 62', 67', 77' Holly Ward	Stadium: Mike A. Myers Stadium; Attendance: 2,342; Referee: Michael Lavergne; Assistant referees: Janae Thompson; Edgar Garcia; Fourth official: Estefania Estrada Sanabria

November 15	Tennessee	1–2	#7 Virginia Tech	Blacksburg, VA
7:00 p.m. EST	Kennedy Price 5'; Dakota Brown (yellow card) 13'	Report	2' Anna Weir; 51' Natalie Mitchell	Stadium: Sandra D. Thompson Field; Attendance: 1,200; Referee: Nicole Green; Assistant referees: Kyle Trissel; Justin Weinstock; Fourth official: Kevin Maurer

November 15	Missouri State	1–2	#3 Iowa	Iowa City, IA
7:00 p.m. CST	Julia Kristensen (yellow card) 55'; Jenna Anderson 78'	Report	22' Meike Ingles; 48' Maggie Johnston; (yellow card) 55' Rielee Fetty	Stadium: Grant Field; Attendance: 2,267

November 15	LSU	1–2	#8 Texas Tech	Lubbock, TX
7:00 p.m. CST	Angelina Thoreson (yellow card) 25'; Amy Smith 46'	Report	23' Taylor Zdrojewski; 42' Skylar Haase	Stadium: John Walker Soccer Complex; Attendance: 1,788; Referee: Lorenzo Hernadez; Assistant referees: Ben Cuyler; Justin Werst; Fourth official: Muhammad Kaleia

November 15	California Baptist	1–2 (a.e.t.)	#2 UCLA	Los Angeles, CA
6:00 p.m. PST	Lauryn White 84'	Report	2' Kara Croone; (yellow card) 89' America Frias; 102' (pen.) Jayden Perry	Stadium: Wallis Annenberg Stadium; Attendance: 1,076; Referee: Jaclyn Metz; Assistant referees: Marissa Postlethwaite; Ana Valdez; Fourth official: Andie Reyes

November 16	Western Michigan	1–3	#5 Michigan State	East Lansing, MI
12:00 p.m. EST	Jen Blitchok 32'; Heidi Thomasma (yellow card) 45'; Brielle Gomez (red card) 50'; Abby Werthman (yellow card) 88'	Report	16' Emily Mathews; 18' Justina Gaynor; 83' Bella Najera	Stadium: DeMartin Soccer Complex; Attendance: 2,152; Referee: Alex Beehler; Assistant referees: Jacob Little; Fernando Pina; Fourth official: Steve Seward

November 16	Fairfield	0–3	#6 Georgetown	Washington, D.C.
12:00 p.m. EST		Report	27' Maja Lardner; 44' Jocelyn Lohmeyer; 72' Natalie Means	Stadium: Cooper Field; Attendance: 687; Referee: Cedric Cook; Assistant referees: Taylor Heemstra; Elena Dauphinais; Fourth official: Magda Zwierzchowski

===== Second round =====
November 22	#5 Michigan State	3–2 (a.e.t.)	#4 Texas	Durham, NC
4:00 p.m. EST	Mackenzie Anthony 8' 92'; Maggie Illig (yellow card) 44'; Renee Watson (yellow card) 62'; Bella Najera 73'	Report	33' Amalia Villarreal; 79' Holly Ward	Stadium: Koskinen Stadium; Referee: Kyle Johnston; Assistant referees: Carmen Serbio; Thomas Rutherford; Fourth official: Raymond Thomas

November 22	#8 Texas Tech	0–3	#1 Duke	Durham, NC
6:30 p.m. EST	Jillian Martinez (yellow card) 30'	Report	44', 53' Maggie Graham; 86' Mia Oliaro	Stadium: Koskinen Stadium; Attendance: 1,364; Referee: John Matto; Assistant referees: Jarred Mosher; Justin Howard; Fourth official: Richard Wells

November 22	#6 Georgetown	0–1	#3 Iowa	Los Angeles, CA
4:00 p.m. PST	Caroline Spengler (yellow card) 44'	Report	55' Meike Ingles	Stadium: Wallis Annenberg Stadium; Referee: Adrian Gonzalez; Assistant referees: Matthew Tanious; Philip Salu; Fourth official: Abdu razzaq Juma

November 22	#7 Virginia Tech	2–1	#2 UCLA	Los Angeles, CA
7:00 p.m. PST	Eden Skyers (yellow card) 17'; Team 51' (o.g.); Natalie Mitchell 53'	Report	(yellow card) 33' Bridgette Marin-Valencia; 60' Ayo Oke	Stadium: Wallis Annenberg Stadium; Attendance: 1,418; Referee: Samantha Martinez; Assistant referees: Pamela Gonzalez; Abdu razzaq Juma; Fourth official: Matthew Tanious

===== Round of 16 =====
November 24	#5 Michigan State	0–2	#1 Duke	Durham, NC
6:00 p.m. EST		Report	43' Carina Lageyre; 54' Devin Lynch	Stadium: Koskinen Stadium; Attendance: 1,274; Referee: Meghan Mullen; Assistant referees: John Rush; Rob Leonard; Fourth official: Esli Leon

November 24	#7 Virginia Tech	1–0	#3 Iowa	Los Angeles, CA
6:00 p.m. PST	Eden Skyers (yellow card) 54'; Allie George 80'	Report	(yellow card) 57' Meike Ingles	Stadium: Wallis Annenberg Stadium; Attendance: 467; Referee: Amber O'Connor; Assistant referees: Krystin Pahia; Hao Guo; Fourth official: Haily Morejon

===== Quarterfinals =====
November 30	#7 Virginia Tech	0–1	#1 Duke	Durham, NC
6:00 p.m. EST	Kylie Marschall (yellow card) 73'	Report	33' Katie Groff	Stadium: Koskinen Stadium; Attendance: 1,581; Referee: Brandon Marion; Assistant referees: Robert Dail; Rick Rogers; Fourth official: Thomas Rutherford

Rankings shown are seeds in this bracket of the tournament.

=== Florida State Bracket ===
First round Campus Sites
2	North Carolina*	8
USC Upstate	0
Santa Clara	1
7	BYU*	0
6	Minnesota*	2
South Dakota State	0
East Carolina	0
3	South Carolina*	6
4	Penn State*	8
Stony Brook	1
Stephen F. Austin	0
5	TCU*	1
8	Vanderbilt*	4
Lipscomb	1
Samford	0
1	Florida State*	8

Second round Regional Campus Sites
2	North Carolina*	1
Santa Clara	0
6	Minnesota	2
3	South Carolina	1
4	Penn State	1
5	TCU	0
8	Vanderbilt (pen.)	3 (4)
1	Florida State*	3 (3)

Round of 16; Regional Campus Sites
2	North Carolina*	3
6	Minnesota	0
4	Penn State	3
8	Vanderbilt	1

Quarterfinal; Campus Sites
2	North Carolina (a.e.t.)*	2
4	Penn State	1

* Host institution

==== Schedule ====
===== First round =====
November 15	Samford	0–8	#1 Florida State	Tallahassee, FL
5:00 p.m. EST		Report	8', 63' Jordynn Dudley; 14' Carissa Boeckmann; 37' Marianyela Jiménez; 50' Solai Washington; 66' Olivia Lebdaoui; 73' Wrianna Hudson; 84' Ashlyn Puerta	Stadium: Seminole Soccer Complex; Attendance: 1,668; Referee: Mario Maric; Assistant referees: Miriama Pinzon; Casie Anderson; Fourth official: Bruce Mattos

November 15	East Carolina	0–6	#3 South Carolina	Columbia, SC
6:00 p.m. EST		Report	31', 57', 76' Katie Shea Collins; 31' (pen.), 55' Catherine Barry; 82' (pen.) Taylor Fox	Stadium: Stone Stadium; Attendance: 1,800; Referee: Kayla Polonsky; Assistant referees: Kyle Johnston; Eric Usher; Fourth official: Steven Faria

November 15	USC Upstate	0–8	#2 North Carolina	Chapel Hill, NC
6:00 p.m. EST		Report	17' (pen.) Bella Sember; 19', 22' Kate Faasse; 60' Olivia Thomas; 67' Caitlin Mara; 74' Bella Gaetino; 76', 78' Linda Ullmark	Stadium: Dorrance Field; Attendance: 1,273; Referee: John Rush; Assistant referees: Thomas Rutherford; Marcus Moss; Fourth official: Howard Ash

November 15	South Dakota State	0–2	#6 Minnesota	Falcon Heights, MN
6:00 p.m. CST	Lauren Eckerle (yellow card) 32'	Report	(yellow card) 28' Caroline Birdsell; 48', 55' (pen.) Sophia Boman	Stadium: Robbie Stadium; Attendance: 992; Referee: Dimitar Chavdarov; Assistant referees: Connor Dunn; Samuel Cottington; Fourth official: Artem Sher

November 15	Lipscomb	1–4	#8 Vanderbilt	Nashville, TN
6:00 p.m. CST	Bella Carapazza (yellow card) 48'; Chloe Iliff 85'	Report	28', 68' Sydney Watts; 30' Maci Teater; 53' Courtney Jones; (yellow card) 56' Francesca Yanchuk; (yellow card) 77' Julianne Leskauskas	Stadium: Vanderbilt Soccer/Lacrosse Complex; Attendance: 1,005; Referee: Lila Remache; Assistant referees: Sarah Gaddes; Celeste Roberts; Fourth official: Jessica Medley

November 15	Stephen F. Austin	0–1	#5 TCU	Fort Worth, TX
7:00 p.m. CST	Ava Shannon (yellow card) 45'; Erin Morgan (yellow card) 57'; Cassidy Hoang (yellow card) 67'; SFA Team (yellow card) 67'	Report	57' (pen.) Caroline Kelly	Stadium: Garvey-Rosenthal Soccer Stadium; Attendance: 1,421; Referee: Brandon Gardner; Assistant referees: Reyes Vargas; Ethan Frie; Fourth official: Habeeb Hooshmand

November 15	Santa Clara	1–0	#7 BYU	Provo, UT
6:00 p.m. MST	Tori Powell 70'; Ava Weiland (yellow card) 81'	Report		Stadium: South Field; Attendance: 2,497; Referee: Nathan Boone; Assistant referees: Karsten Gillwald; Rachel Swett; Fourth official: Taylor Poulsen

November 16	Stony Brook	1–8	#4 Penn State	University Park, PA
6:00 p.m. EST	Luciana Setteducate 58'	Report	9' Kaitlyn MacBean; 17' Bella Ayscue; 37' Julia Raich; 42', 64' Rebecca Cooke; 52' Katie Scott; 88', 88' Aubrey Kulpa	Stadium: Jeffrey Field; Attendance: 693; Referee: Ashley Cedro; Assistant referees: Sharon Gingrich; Taylor Bombalski; Fourth official: Ashley Smyda

===== Second round =====
November 22	#6 Minnesota	2–1	#3 South Carolina	Chapel Hill, NC
2:00 p.m. EST	Sophia Boman 57' (pen.); Sophia Romine 70'	Report	9' Katie Shea Collins	Stadium: Dorrance Field; Referee: Danielle Chesky; Assistant referees: Lauren Aldrich; Hudson Owens; Fourth official: Kevin Uitto

November 22	#5 TCU	0–1	#4 Penn State	Tallahassee, FL
2:00 p.m. EST	Camryn Lancaster (yellow card) 68'	Report	Kaitlyn MacBean 47'; Team (yellow card) 60'	Stadium: Seminole Soccer Complex

November 22	Santa Clara	0–1	#2 North Carolina	Chapel Hill, NC
4:30 p.m. EST	Sally Menti (yellow card) 89'	Report	(yellow card) 84' Kate Faasse; 90' Tessa Dellarose; (yellow card) 90' Team	Stadium: Dorrance Field; Attendance: 1,893; Referee: Meghan Mullen; Assistant referees: Rick Rogers; Jeremy L.E. Smith; Fourth official: Aaron Hormuth

November 22	#8 Vanderbilt	3–3 (a.e.t.) (4–3 p)	#1 Florida State	Tallahassee, FL
5:30 p.m. EST	Rachel Deresky 10'; Caroline Betts 13', 79'; Abi Brighton (yellow card) 18'; Jessica Hinton (yellow card) 24'	Report	1' Marianyela Jiménez; 30' Jordynn Dudley; 81' Kameron Simmonds	Stadium: Seminole Soccer Complex; Attendance: 2,128; Referee: Richonne Clark; Assistant referees: Shevah Rezaee; Thomas Brigman; Fourth official: Mario Maric
	Penalties
	Courtney Jones (penalty scored); Hannah McLaughlin (penalty missed); Vivian Akyirem (penalty scored); Sydney Watts (penalty scored); Abi Brighton (penalty scored)		(penalty scored) Taylor Huff; (penalty scored) Solai Washington; (penalty scored) Heather Gilchrist; (penalty missed) Marianyela Jiménez; (penalty missed) Carissa Boeckmann

===== Round of 16 =====
November 24	#6 Minnesota	0–3	#2 North Carolina	Chapel Hill, NC
5:00 p.m. EST		Report	17' Linda Ullmark; 44' Evelyn Shores; 57' Olivia Thomas	Stadium: Dorrance Field; Attendance: 1,903; Referee: JC Griggs; Assistant referees: Nicholas Seymour; Chris Zuerner; Fourth official: Ross McKernan

November 24	#8 Vanderbilt	1–3	#4 Penn State	Tallahassee, FL
5:30 p.m. EST	Caroline Betts 8'	Report	42' Aubrey Kulpa; 59' Natalie Wilson; 66' (pen.) Rowan Lapi	Stadium: Seminole Soccer Complex; Attendance: 193; Referee: Elvis Osmanovic

===== Quarterfinals =====
November 29	#4 Penn State	1–2 (a.e.t.)	#2 North Carolina	Chapel Hill, NC
5:00 p.m. EST	Katie Scott 14'; Rowan Lapi (yellow card) 36'	Report	49' Bella Gaetino; (yellow card) 63' Aria Nagai; (yellow card) 74' Emerson Elgin; 98' Kate Faasse	Stadium: Dorrance Field; Attendance: 2,879; Referee: Amin Hadzic; Assistant referees: Sharon Gingrich; Marcus Moss; Fourth official: Dustin Thorne

Rankings shown are seeds in this bracket of the tournament.

=== Southern California Bracket ===
First round Campus Sites
1	USC*	5
Sacramento State	0
Kansas	0
8	Saint Louis*	1
5	Wisconsin*	3
Maine	1
Princeton	1
4	Virginia*	2
3	Ohio State*	4
James Madison	1
FIU	1
6	Auburn*	4
7	Georgia*	2
Colorado	3
Morehead State	0
2	Wake Forest*	4

Second round Regional Campus Sites
1	USC* (a.e.t.)	4
8	Saint Louis	3
5	Wisconsin (pen.)	0 (4)
4	Virginia	0 (2)
3	Ohio State	2
6	Auburn	1
Colorado	1
2	Wake Forest*	3

Round of 16; Regional Campus Sites
1	USC*	3
5	Wisconsin	1
3	Ohio State	0
2	Wake Forest (pen.)*	1

Quarterfinal; Campus Sites
1	USC*	2 (3)
2	Wake Forest	2 (4)

* Host institution

==== Schedule ====
===== First round =====
November 15	Colorado	3–2	#7 Georgia	Athens, GA
4:30 p.m. EST	Ava Priest 24' (pen.); Hope Leyba 55'; Shyra James 63'	Report	(yellow card) 19' Cate Hardin; 30' Margie Detrizio; 37' Hannah White; (yellow card) 49' Abby Unkraut	Stadium: Turner Soccer Complex; Attendance: 600; Referee: Dorian del Toro Urueta; Assistant referees: Carmen Serbio; Margaret Burkett; Fourth official: Logan Busby

November 15	James Madison	1–4	#3 Ohio State	Columbus, OH
6:00 p.m. EST	Amanda Attanasi 35'; JMU Team (yellow card) 63'	Report	1' Amanda Schlueter; 21' Jacinda Bonham; 63' Kailyn Dudukovich; 68' Jadin Bonham	Stadium: Jesse Owens Memorial Stadium; Attendance: 692; Referee: Erin Patterson; Assistant referees: Aaron Fong; Laura Snyder; Fourth official: Jeffrey Mellen

November 15	Morehead State	0–4	#2 Wake Forest	Winston-Salem, NC
6:00 p.m. EST		Report	2' Anna Swanson; 13', 15' Caiya Hanks; 26' Emily Murphy	Stadium: W. Dennie Spry Soccer Stadium; Attendance: 601; Referee: John Matto; Assistant referees: Rick Rogers; Jason Kent; Fourth official: Dustin Thorne

November 15	Princeton	1–2	#4 Virginia	Charlottesville, VA
7:00 p.m. EST	Pietra Tordin 6'; Zoe Markesini (yellow card) 66'	Report	14' Yuna McCormack; (yellow card) 32' Kiki Maki; 48' Maggie Cagle	Stadium: Klöckner Stadium; Attendance: 1,120; Referee: Jude Carr; Assistant referees: Jeremy Smith; Sharon Gingrich; Fourth official: Alex Luttmann

November 15	FIU	1–4	#6 Auburn	Auburn, AL
7:00 p.m. EST	Catherine Rapp 80'	Report	4' LJ Knox; 24' Jessica Osborne; 78' Jordyn Crosby; 84' Hayden Colson	Stadium: Auburn Soccer Complex; Attendance: 551; Referee: Amin Hadzic; Assistant referees: Shevah Rezaee; Gunwan Park; Fourth official: Thomas Brigman

November 15	Kansas	0–1	#8 Saint Louis	Saint Louis, MO
7:00 p.m. CST		Report	20' Emily Gaebe	Stadium: Hermann Stadium; Attendance: 3,136; Referee: Shane Butler; Assistant referees: Zachary Richter; Joseph Macht; Fourth official: Braeden Frey

November 15	Maine	1–3	#5 Wisconsin	Madison, WI
7:00 p.m. CST	Julie Lossius (yellow card) 35'; Lara Kirkby 48'; Anna Phillips (yellow card) 52'	Report	2' Ayrssa Mahrt; 4' Ashley Martinez; (yellow card) 35' Peighton Steffen; 57' Erin Connolly	Stadium: McClimon Soccer Complex; Attendance: 502; Referee: Katie McCormick; Assistant referees: Jared Kuehl; Adam Herges; Fourth official: Peter Bernardy

November 17	Sacramento State	0–5	#1 USC	Carson, CA
2:00 p.m. PST	Abigail Lopez (yellow card) 65'; Dalen Lau (yellow card) 81'	Report	4' (pen.) Brooklyn Courtnall; 13' Helena Sampaio; 17' Simone Jackson; 50' Maria Alagoa; 90' Florianne Jourde	Stadium: Dignity Health Sports Park; Attendance: 541; Referee: Joseph Salinas; Assistant referees: Shayan Afzali; Haily Morejon; Fourth official: Felix Granados

===== Second round =====
November 22	#6 Auburn	1–2	#3 Ohio State	Winston-Salem, NC
2:00 p.m. EST	Olivia Woodson 85'	Report	32' Kailyn Dudukovich; 43' Amanda Schlueter; (yellow card) 71' Anika Poremba	Stadium: W. Dennie Spry Soccer Stadium; Attendance: 167; Referee: Marie Durr; Assistant referees: Jude Carr; Sharon Gingrich; Fourth official: Robert Leonard

November 22	#5 Wisconsin	0–0 (a.e.t.) (4–2 p)	#4 Virginia	Irvine, CA
2:00 p.m. PST		Report	(yellow card) 36' Laughlin Ryan	Stadium: Great Park Soccer Stadium; Attendance: 178; Referee: Jaclyn Metz; Assistant referees: Kristin Patterson; Amanda Dibiasio; Fourth official: Jaclyn Reilman
	Penalties
	Hailey Baumann (penalty scored); Erin Connolly (penalty scored); Aryssa Mahrt (penalty scored); Ella Ottey (penalty scored)		(penalty missed) Maggie Cagle; (penalty scored) Yuna McCormack; (penalty scored) Lia Godfrey; (penalty missed) Linda Mittermair

November 22	Colorado	1–3	#2 Wake Forest	Winston-Salem, NC
6:00 p.m. EST	Hope Leyba (yellow card) 41'; Ava Priest (yellow card) 57' (goal) 74'	Report	6' Emily Colton; 61' Emily Morris; 88' Emily Murphy	Stadium: W. Dennie Spry Soccer Stadium; Attendance: 612; Referee: Michael Lavergne; Assistant referees: Jason White; Jason Kent; Fourth official: William Steffen

November 22	#8 Saint Louis	3–4 (a.e.t.)	#1 USC	Irvine, CA
5:00 p.m. PST	Hannah Larson 48'; Lyndsey Heckel (yellow card) 56'; Sophia Stram 64', 88'	Report	12', 98' (pen.) Maile Hayes; (yellow card) 58' (goal) 62' Simone Jackson; (yellow card) 71' Helena Sampaio; 87' Kayla Colbert	Stadium: Great Park Soccer Stadium; Attendance: 688; Referee: Irving Navarro; Assistant referees: Togayhan Tarim; Killian Richardson; Fourth official: Jaclyn Reilman

===== Round of 16 =====
November 24	#3 Ohio State	0–1	#2 Wake Forest	Winston-Salem, NC
2:00 p.m. EST		Report	(yellow card) 65', (goal) 76' Emily Murphy; (yellow card) 90' Emily Morris	Stadium: W. Dennie Spry Soccer Stadium; Attendance: 870; Referee: Kyle Johnston; Assistant referees: Raymond Thomas; Lauren Aldrich; Fourth official: John Matto

November 24	#5 Wisconsin	1–3	#1 USC	Irvine, CA
4:00 p.m. PST	Erin Connolly (yellow card) 63'; Dara Andringa 84'	Report	41' (pen.) BK Harris; 59' Helena Sampaio; 64' Maile Hayes	Stadium: Great Park Soccer Stadium; Attendance: 1,087; Referee: Jessica Peralta; Assistant referees: Mellisa Gonzalez; Andie Reyes

===== Quarterfinals =====
November 29	#2 Wake Forest	2–2 (a.e.t.) (4–3 p)	#1 USC	Carson, CA
2:00 p.m. PST	Caiya Hanks 22'; Malaika Meena (yellow card) 72'; Emily Murphy (yellow card) 75'; Alex Wood 80'	Report	47' Simone Jackson; 59' Kayla Colbert; (yellow card) 106' Angeles Escobar	Stadium: Dignity Health Sports Park; Attendance: 1,208; Referee: Amber O'Connor; Assistant referees: Jessica Peralta; Melissa Beck; Fourth official: Kristin Patterson
	Penalties
	Emily Murphy (penalty scored); Malaika Meena (penalty scored); Valentina Amaral (penalty missed); Sierra Sythe (penalty scored); Kristin Johnson (penalty scored)		(penalty missed) Helena Sampaio; (penalty scored) Katie Park; (penalty missed) BK Harris; (penalty scored) Simone Jackson; (penalty scored) Maile Hayes

Rankings shown are seeds in this bracket of the tournament.

=== Mississippi State Bracket ===
First round Campus Sites
2	Arkansas*	4
Oklahoma State	0
California (a.e.t.)	2
7	Pepperdine	1
6	Rutgers*	1
UConn	2
UC Santa Barbara	0
3	Stanford*	5
4	Notre Dame*	5
Milwaukee	1
West Virginia	1 (2)
5	Kentucky (pen.)*	1 (4)
8	Utah State*	0 (1)
Washington (pen.)	0 (3)
Southern	0
1	Mississippi State*	7

Second round Regional Campus Sites
2	Arkansas*	1
California	0
UConn	1
3	Stanford	2
4	Notre Dame	3
5	Kentucky	1
Washington	0
1	Mississippi State	1

Round of 16; Regional Campus Sites
2	Arkansas*	1 (2)
3	Stanford (pen.)	1 (4)
4	Notre Dame	2
1	Mississippi State*	0

Quarterfinal; Campus Sites
3	Stanford*	2
4	Notre Dame	0

* Host institution

==== Schedule ====
===== First round =====
November 15	Washington	0–0 (a.e.t.) (3–1 p)	#8 Utah State	Logan, UT
2:00 p.m. MST	Tatum Thomason (yellow card) 99'	Report		Stadium: Chuck & Gloria Bell Soccer Field; Attendance: 1,862; Referee: Brad Church; Assistant referees: Daniel Reading; Fernando Varini; Fourth official: Michael Anglin
	Penalties
	Ioanna Papatheodorou (penalty scored); Jadyn Holdenried (penalty scored); Alex Buck (penalty scored)		(penalty missed) Rine Yohana; (penalty scored) Alysia Butters; (penalty missed) Mia Mullenmeister; (penalty missed) Kylie Olsen

November 15	Milwaukee	1–5	#4 Notre Dame	Notre Dame, IN
7:00 p.m. EST	Savannah Sievert (yellow card) 42'; Jenni Andjelic 59'	Report	38' Reagan Pauwels; 54' Grace Restovich; 63' Izzy Engle; 70' Kaylie Ronan; 88' Paige Buchner	Stadium: Alumni Stadium; Attendance: 1,030; Referee: Nicholas Balcer; Assistant referees: Jake Brochu; Shane Richards; Fourth official: Grace Barrett

November 15	West Virginia	1–1 (a.e.t.) (2–4 p)	#5 Kentucky	Lexington, KY
7:00 p.m. EST	Lisa Schoppl (yellow card) 42'; Olivia Shertzer 52'; Ajanae Respass (yellow card) 61'; Bailey Herfurth (yellow card) 110'	Report	(yellow card) 27' Coach; 54' Madison Kemp	Stadium: Wendell & Vickie Bell Soccer Complex; Attendance: 1,360; Referee: Sorin Stoica; Assistant referees: Maggie Short; Noah Matos; Fourth official: Aaron Hernandez
	Penalties
	Nyima Ingleton (penalty scored); Chloe Adler (penalty missed); Annika Leslie (penalty scored); Ajanae Respass (penalty missed)		(penalty scored) Makala Woods; (penalty scored) Michelle Moskau; (penalty scored) Grace Hoytink; (penalty scored) Sophia Mattice

November 15	Oklahoma State	0–4	#2 Arkansas	Fayetteville, AR
6:30 p.m. CST	Logan Heausle (yellow card) 34'	Report	6', 18' Kate Doyle; 16' Anaiyah Robinson; 41' Kiley Dulaney	Stadium: Razorback Field; Attendance: 2,235; Referee: Daniel Radford; Assistant referees: Aaron Donahoe; Chris Thresher; Fourth official: Brook Weiss

November 15	UC Santa Barbara	0–5	#3 Stanford	Stanford, CA
6:00 p.m. PST	Gia Cimring (yellow card) 12'	Report	21' (o.g.) Emma Corcoran; 23' Charlotte Kohler; 53' Andrea Kitahata; 54' Lizzie Boamah; 78' Lumi Kostmayer	Stadium: Maloney Field at Laird Q. Cagan Stadium; Attendance: 1,904; Referee: Jamie Padilla; Assistant referees: Jessica Peralta; Roxana Guillen; Fourth official: Cecilia Chavez

November 16	California	2–1 (a.e.t.)	#7 Pepperdine	Malibu, CA
12:00 p.m. PST	Alexis Wright 33'; Courtney Boone 106'	Report	59' Peyton Leonard	Stadium: Tari Frahm Rokus Field; Attendance: 626; Referee: Brandon Stevis; Assistant referees: Kristin Patterson; Amanda Dibiasio; Fourth official: Matthew Tanions

November 16	UConn	2–1	#6 Rutgers	Piscataway, NJ
5:00 p.m. EST	Chioma Okafor 31'; Lucy Cappadona 37'	Report	70' Alyssa Martinez; (yellow card) 80' Sydney Urban	Stadium: Yurcak Field; Attendance: 1,637; Referee: Marie Durr; Assistant referees: Joseph Knoff; Zachary Rubinich; Fourth official: Danielle Cornetta

November 16	Southern	0–7	#1 Mississippi State	Starkville, MS
5:00 p.m. CST		Report	9' Maggie Wadsworth; 19' Price Loposer; 28' (pen.) Aitana Martinez-Montoya; (yellow card) 42' Ruthny Mathurin; 49' Rylie Combs; 52' Ally Perry; 55' Zoe Main; 71' Kara Harris	Stadium: MSU Soccer Field; Attendance: 3,461; Referee: Wes Caouette; Assistant referees: Ethan Wilson; Laadi Issaka; Fourth official: Laith Dahhan

===== Second round =====
November 22	#5 Kentucky	1–3	#4 Notre Dame	Starkville, MS
2:30 p.m. CST	Catherine DeRosa 53'; Katherine Truitt (yellow card) 80'; Madison Kemp (yellow card) 90'	Report	4' Izzy Engle; 13' (pen.), 60' Lily Joseph; (yellow card) 30' Annabelle Chukwu; (yellow card) 32' Grace Restovich	Stadium: MSU Soccer Field; Attendance: 290

November 22	UConn	1–2	#3 Stanford	Fayetteville, AR
3:00 p.m. CST	Anaya Johnson 11'	Report	86' Shae Harvey; 90' Allie Montoya	Stadium: Razorback Field; Attendance: 1,516; Referee: Lorenzo Hernandez; Assistant referees: Bryan Lemus; Chris Thresher; Fourth official: DeShun Beard

November 22	Washington	0–1	#1 Mississippi State	Starkville, MS
6:00 p.m. CST	Kate Cheldelin (yellow card) 64'; Kolo Suliafu (yellow card) 86' (yellow-red card) 88'	Report	(yellow card) 12' Alexis Gutierrez; 72' Zoe Main; (yellow card) 77' Ruthny Mathurin; (yellow card) 88' Hannah Johnson; (yellow card) 89' Macey Hodge	Stadium: MSU Soccer Field; Attendance: 4,022; Referee: Matthew Thompson; Assistant referees: Sam Bilbo; Michael Smith; Fourth official: Donovan Eubank

November 22	California	0–1	#2 Arkansas	Fayetteville, AR
6:30 p.m. CST	Skylar Briggs (yellow card) 65'; Velize King (yellow card) 90'	Report	(yellow card) 58' Ella Riley; 65' Bella Field	Stadium: Razorback Field; Attendance: 1,701; Referee: Matthew Corrigan; Assistant referees: Ryan Starr; Albert Kyei-Mensah; Fourth official: Brook Weiss

===== Round of 16 =====
November 24	#4 Notre Dame	2–0	#1 Mississippi State	Starkville, MS
5:00 p.m. CST	Izzy Engle 25'; Grace Restovich 30'	Report	(yellow card) 35' Ally Perry; (yellow card) 66' Ruthny Mathurin	Stadium: MSU Soccer Field; Attendance: 3,772; Referee: Dorian Del Toro Urueta; Assistant referees: Josh Hinkle; Celeste Roberts; Fourth official: Deny Kulasinac

November 24	#3 Stanford	1–1 (a.e.t.) (4–2 p)	#2 Arkansas	Fayetteville, AR
6:00 p.m. CST	Nya Harrison (yellow card) 7'; Allie Montoya (yellow card) 9'; Elise Evans (yellow card) 11'; Charlotte Kohler 56'	Report	(yellow card) 18' Ainsley Erzen; 28' Bella Field; (yellow card) 83' Avery Wren	Stadium: Razorback Field; Attendance: 2,214; Referee: Travis Haight; Assistant referees: Laura Chambers-Waliski; Daniel Ortega; Fourth official: Jose Lara
	Penalties
	Andrea Kitahata (penalty scored); Lumi Kostmayer (penalty scored); Haley Craig (penalty scored); Shae Harvey (penalty scored)		(penalty scored) Bella Field; (penalty missed) Ava Tankersley; (penalty missed) Taylor Berman; (penalty scored) Kate Doyle

===== Quarterfinals =====
November 29	#4 Notre Dame	0–2	#3 Stanford	Stanford, CA
2:00 p.m. PST		Report	25' Shae Harvey; 50' Andrea Kitahata	Stadium: Maloney Field at Laird Q. Cagan Stadium; Attendance: 2,042; Referee: Jaclyn Metz; Assistant referees: Andie Reyes; Krystin Pahia; Fourth official: Victor Mba

Rankings shown are seeds in this bracket of the tournament.

=== College Cup ===
Semi-finals; December 6 WakeMed Soccer Park; Cary, North Carolina
1	Duke	0
2	North Carolina	3
2	Wake Forest	1
3	Stanford	0

Final; December 9 WakeMed Soccer Park; Cary, North Carolina
2	North Carolina	1
2	Wake Forest	0

==== Schedule ====
===== Semi-finals =====
December 6	#3 Wake Forest	1–0	#14т Stanford	Cary, NC
5:00 p.m. EST	Emily Morris 73'	Report	(yellow card) 85' Joelle Jung	Stadium: WakeMed Soccer Park; Referee: Samantha Martinez; Assistant referees: James Duling; Shaye Lane; Fourth official: Kevin Maurer

December 6	#1 Duke	0–3	#8 North Carolina	Cary, NC
7:30 p.m. EST	Cameron Roller (yellow card) 80'	Report	10' (pen.) Kate Faasse; 24' Olivia Thomas; (yellow card) 35' Bella Gaetino; 59' Maddie Dahlien	Stadium: WakeMed Soccer Park; Attendance: 10,333; Referee: Ashley Cedro; Assistant referees: Jeremy L.B. Smith; Kristin Patterson; Fourth official: Kevin Maurer

===== Final =====
December 9	#3 Wake Forest	0–1	#8 North Carolina	Cary, NC
7:00 p.m. EST	Emily Murphy (yellow card) 61'; Dempsey Brown (yellow card) 62'; Emily Morris (yellow card) 73'	Report	(yellow card) 19' Bella Gaetino; 62' Olivia Thomas; (yellow card) 73' Team; (yellow card) 74' Maddie Dahlien	Stadium: WakeMed Soccer Park; Attendance: 9,475; Referee: Danielle Chesky; Assistant referees: Katarzyna Wasiak; Laura Chambers Waliski; Fourth official: John Rush

Rankings from United Soccer Coaches Final Regular Season Rankings

== Record by conference ==
Conference	Bids	Record	Pct.	R32	R16	E8	F4	CG	NC
ACC	9	26–6–4	.778	9	6	6	4	2	1
Big Ten	10	16–9–3	.625	9	7	2	–	–	–
SEC	10	8–9–3	.475	7	3	–	–	–	–
Big East	2	2–2	.500	2	–	–	–	–	–
Atlantic 10	1	1–1	.500	1	–	–	–	–	–
Big 12	7	3–6–1	.350	3	–	–	–	–	–
West Coast	2	1–2	.333	1	–	–	–	–	–
Other	23	0–22–1	.022	–	–	–	–	–	–

- The R32, S16, E8, F4, CG, and NC columns indicate how many teams from each conference were in the Round of 32 (second round), Round of 16 (third round), Quarterfinals (Elite Eight), Semi-finals (Final Four), Championship Game, and National Champion, respectively.
- The following conferences received one bid and failed to place a team into the round of 32: American, American East, ASUN, Big Sky, Big South, Big West, CAA, C-USA, Horizon, Ivy, Missouri Valley, MAAC, MAC, Mountain West, Northeast, Ohio Valley, Patriot, SoCon, Southland, Summit League, Sun Belt, SWAC, WAC. These conference's records have been consolidated in the "Other" row.

== Statistics ==
=== Goalscorers ===
There were 214 goals scored in 63 matches, for an average of 3.4 goals per match (as of December 9, 2024).

5 goals

- (Canada) Holly Ward – Texas

4 goals

- (United States) Maggie Graham – Duke
- (United States) Mia Minestrella – Duke
- (United States) Kate Faasse – North Carolina
- (United States) Olivia Thomas – North Carolina
- (United States) Katie Shea Collins – South Carolina

3 goals

- (United States) Jordynn Dudley – Florida State
- (United States) Sophia Boman – Minnesota
- (United States) Linda Ullmark – North Carolina
- (United States) Izzy Engle – Notre Dame
- (United States) Aubrey Kulpa – Penn State
- (United States) Maile Hayes – USC
- (United States) Simone Jackson – USC
- (United States) Caroline Betts – Vanderbilt
- (United States) Caiya Hanks – Wake Forest
- (Republic of Ireland) Emily Murphy – Wake Forest

2 goals

- (United States) Kate Doyle – Arkansas
- (United States) Bella Field – Arkansas
- (United States) Ava Priest – Colorado
- (Venezuela) Marianyela Jiménez – Florida State
- (United States) Meike Ingles – Iowa
- (United States) Mackenzie Anthony – Michigan State
- (United States) Bella Najera – Michigan State
- (United States) Zoe Main – Mississippi State
- (United States) Bella Gaetino – North Carolina
- (United States) Lily Joseph – Notre Dame
- (United States) Grace Restovich – Notre Dame
- (United States) Kailyn Dudukovich – Ohio State
- (United States) Amanda Schlueter – Ohio State
- (Republic of Ireland) Rebecca Cooke – Penn State
- (United States) Kaitlyn MacBean – Penn State
- (United States) Katie Scott – Penn State
- (United States) Sophia Stram – Saint Louis
- (United States) Catherine Barry – South Carolina
- (United States) Shae Harvey – Stanford
- (United States) Andrea Kitahata – Stanford
- (United States) Charlotte Kohler – Stanford
- (United States) Kayla Colbert – USC
- (Brazil) Helena Sampaio – USC
- (United States) Sydney Watts – Vanderbilt
- (United States) Natalie Mitchell – Virginia Tech
- (United States) Emily Morris – Wake Forest

1 goal

- (United States) Kiley Dulaney – Arkansas
- (United States) Anaiyah Robinson – Arkansas
- (United States) Hayden Colson – Auburn
- (United States) Jordyn Crosby – Auburn
- (United States) LJ Knox – Auburn
- (United States) Jessica Osborne – Auburn
- (United States) Olivia Woodson – Auburn
- (United States) Morgan Fagan – Boston University
- (United States) Courtney Boone – California
- (United States) Alexis Wright – California
- (United States) Lauryn White – California Baptist
- (United States) Shyra James – Colorado
- (United States) Hope Leyba – Colorado
- (United States) Katie Groff – Duke
- (United States) Carina Lageyre – Duke
- (United States) Mary Long – Duke
- (United States) Devin Lynch – Duke
- (United States) Mia Oliaro – Duke
- (United States) Sophia Recupero – Duke
- (United States) Catherine Rapp – FIU
- (United States) Carissa Boeckmann – Florida State
- (United States) Wrianna Hudson – Florida State
- (United States) Olivia Lebdaoui – Florida State
- (United States) Ashlyn Puerta – Florida State
- (Jamaica) Kameron Simmonds – Florida State
- (Jamaica) Solai Washington – Florida State
- (United States) Maja Lardner – Georgetown
- (United States) Jocelyn Lohmeyer – Georgetown
- (United States) Natalie Means – Georgetown
- (United States) Margie Detrizio – Georgia
- (United States) Hannah White – Georgia
- (United States) Maggie Johnston – Iowa
- (United States) Amanda Attanasi – James Madison
- (United States) Catherine DeRosa – Kentucky
- (United States) Madison Kemp – Kentucky
- (United States) Chloe Iliff – Lipscomb
- (United States) Amy Smith – LSU
- (Australia) Lara Kirkby – Maine
- (United States) Justina Gaynor – Michigan State
- (United States) Emily Mathews – Michigan State
- (China) Jenni Andjelic – Milwaukee
- (United States) Sophia Romine – Minnesota
- (United States) Rylie Combs – Mississippi State
- (United States) Kara Harris – Mississippi State
- (United States) Price Loposer – Mississippi State
- (Spain) Aitana Martinez-Montoya – Mississippi State
- (United States) Ally Perry – Mississippi State
- (United States) Maggie Wadsworth – Mississippi State
- (United States) Jenna Anderson – Missouri State
- (United States) Maddie Dahlien – North Carolina
- (United States) Tessa Dellarose – North Carolina
- (United States) Caitlin Mara – North Carolina
- (United States) Bella Sember – North Carolina
- (United States) Evelyn Shores – North Carolina
- (United States) Paige Buchner – Notre Dame
- (United States) Reagan Pauwels – Notre Dame
- (United States) Kaylie Ronan – Notre Dame
- (United States) Jacinda Bonham – Ohio State
- (United States) Jadin Bonham – Ohio State
- (United States) Bella Ayscue – Penn State
- (United States) Rowan Lapi – Penn State
- (United States) Julia Raich – Penn State
- (United States) Natalie Wilson – Penn State
- (United States) Peyton Leonard – Pepperdine
- (United States) Pietra Tordin – Princeton
- (United States) Alyssa Martinez – Rutgers
- (United States) Emily Gaebe – Saint Louis
- (United States) Hannah Larson – Saint Louis
- (United States) Tori Powell – Santa Clara
- (United States) Taylor Fox – South Carolina
- (United States) Lizzie Boamah – Stanford
- (United States) Lumi Kostmayer – Stanford
- (United States) Allie Montoya – Stanford
- (United States) Luciana Setteducate – Stony Brook
- (United States) Caroline Kelly – TCU
- (United States) Kennedy Price – Tennessee
- (United States) Amalia Villarreal – Texas
- (United States) Skylar Haase – Texas Tech
- (United States) Taylor Zdrojewski – Texas Tech
- (United States) Kara Croone – UCLA
- (United States) Ayo Oke – UCLA
- (United States) Jayden Perry – UCLA
- (United States) Lucy Cappadona – UConn
- (Canada) Anaya Johnson – UConn
- (Nigeria) Chioma Okafor – UConn
- (Portugal) Maria Alagoa – USC
- (Canada) Brooklyn Courtnall – USC
- (United States) BK Harris – USC
- (Canada) Florianne Jourde – USC
- (United States) Rachel Deresky – Vanderbilt
- (United States) Courtney Jones – Vanderbilt
- (United States) Maci Teater – Vanderbilt
- (United States) Maggie Cagle – Virginia
- (United States) Yuna McCormack – Virginia
- (United States) Allie George – Virginia Tech
- (United States) Anna Weir – Virginia Tech
- (United States) Emily Colton – Wake Forest
- (United States) Anna Swanson – Wake Forest
- (United States) Alex Wood – Wake Forest
- (United States) Olivia Shertzer – West Virginia
- (United States) Jen Blitchok – Western Michigan
- (United States) Dara Andringa – Wisconsin
- (United States) Erin Connolly – Wisconsin
- (United States) Aryssa Mahrt – Wisconsin
- (United States) Ashley Martinez – Wisconsin

1 own goal

- UC Santa Barbara (vs. Stanford)
- UCLA (vs. Virginia Tech)

== All-tournament team ==
- Trinity Armstrong, North Carolina
- Hannah Bebar, Duke
- Lizzie Boamah, Stanford
- Zara Chavoshi, Wake Forest
- Emily Colton, Wake Forest
- Clare Gagne, North Carolina (Most Outstanding Defensive Player)
- Ella Hase, Duke
- Allie Montoya, Stanford
- Emily Murphy, Wake Forest
- Olivia Thomas, North Carolina (Most Outstanding Offensive Player)
- Linda Ullmark, North Carolina
