= Minnesota Golden Gophers women's soccer =

American college soccer team

- University: University of Minnesota
- Head coach: Erin Chastain (6th season)
- Conference: Big Ten
- Location: Falcon Heights, Minnesota, US
- Stadium: Elizabeth Lyle Robbie Stadium (capacity: 1,000)
- Nickname: Golden Gophers
- Colors: Maroon and gold
Home	Away

NCAA tournament Round of 16
- 1997, 2008, 2010, 2024

NCAA tournament appearances
- 1995, 1996, 1997, 1998, 1999, 2008, 2010, 2013, 2015, 2016, 2018, 2024

Conference tournament championships
- 1995, 2016, 2018

Conference regular season championships
- 1995, 1997, 2008, 2016

The Minnesota Golden Gophers women's soccer team is the program who represents the University of Minnesota in the Big Ten Conference of NCAA Division I soccer. The current head coach is Erin Chastain who is in her first year as the Gopher head coach. As of 2023, the team is sponsored by an attorney and an internet personality, Darryl Isaacs.

== Current roster ==
As of 17 Sep 2024

Note: Flags indicate national team as defined under FIFA eligibility rules; some limited exceptions apply. Players may hold more than one non-FIFA nationality.

No.	Pos.	Nation	Player
00	GK	USA	Sarah Martin
1	GK	USA	Alex Isaacs
2	FW	USA	Grace Fogarty
3	MF	USA	Kate Childers
4	MF	USA	Taylor Heimerl
5	FW	USA	Paige Kalal
6	MF	USA	Alma Beaton
7	DF	USA	Madeline Raymond
8	MF	USA	Sophia Romine
9	MF	USA	Sophia Boman
10	FW	USA	Katie Krohn
11	FW	USA	Aaryn Gabriel
12	MF	USA	Jelena Zbiljic
13	DF	USA	Ally Childers

No.	Pos.	Nation	Player
14	FW	USA	Kendall Stadden
15	DF	USA	Karson Yon
16	MF	USA	Ashley Thurk
17	DF	USA	Fiona Skwierawski
18	DF	USA	Elizabeth Overberg
20	FW	USA	Grace Estby
22	FW	USA	Caroline Birdsell
23	FW	USA	Davy Mokelke
24	DF	GER	Teresa Buonarroti
25	MF	USA	Evelyn Calhoon
26	MF	USA	Avery Petty
34	FW	USA	Khyah Harper
88	GK	CAN	Camellia Xu

== Record by year ==
Record table
Season	Coach	Overall	Conference	Standing	Postseason
Minnesota (Independent) (1993–1993)
1993	Sue Patberg	13–6–0			
Minnesota (Big Ten Conference) (1994–present)
1994	Sue Patberg	10–6–4	3–2–2	5th	
1995	Sue Patberg	16–5–2	5–1–1	1st	NCAA 1st Round
1996	Sue Patberg	13–7–0	5–2–0	3rd	NCAA 1st Round
1997	Sue Patberg	18–3–2	9–0–0	1st	NCAA 2nd Round
1998	Sue Patberg	14–6–1	5–4–0	6th	NCAA 2nd Round
1999	Sue Patberg	13–9–0	6–4–0	4th	NCAA 2nd Round
2000	Barbara Wickstrand	8–10–1	5–5–0	T–6th	
2001	Barbara Wickstrand	5–12–0	3–7–0	10th	
2002	Barbara Wickstrand	7–11–1	1–9–0	11th	
2003	Barbara Wickstrand	6–10–2	2–7–1	10th	
2004	Mikki Denney Wright	8–10–0	2–8–0	10th	
2005	Mikki Denney Wright	9–8–2	6–4–0	5th	
2006	Mikki Denney Wright	8–9–2	1–8–1	T–10th	
2007	Mikki Denney Wright	9–8–2	5–5–0	T–5th	
2008	Mikki Denney Wright	22–4–0	8–2–0	T–1st	NCAA Sweet 16
2009	Mikki Denney Wright	12–5–3	5–3–2	T–4th	
2010	Mikki Denney Wright	14–6–3	4–4–2	6th	NCAA Sweet 16
2011	Mikki Denney Wright	9–10–2	5–4–2	T–5th	
2012	Stefanie Golan	11–7–2	6–4–1	T–4th	
2013	Stefanie Golan	11–8–2	4–5–2	T–8th	NCAA 2nd Round
2014	Stefanie Golan	11–9–1	7–5–1	T–5th	
2015	Stefanie Golan	12–7–3	6–4–1	6th	NCAA 2nd Round
2016	Stefanie Golan	16–3–4	7–1–3	T–1st	NCAA 1st Round
2017	Stefanie Golan	11–5–3	7–3–1	T–2nd	
Total:		286–184–42	117-101–20		
National champion Postseason invitational champion Conference regular season champion Conference regular season and conference tournament champion Division regular season champion Division regular season and conference tournament champion Conference tournament champion

School	Season	Record	Conf. record	Postseason
Total	25 years	286–184–42	(117-101–20)	10 Postseason bids

- Totals updated through the end of the 2017–2018 school year.
