= Elizabeth Lyle Robbie Stadium =

Soccer stadium in Minnesota, US

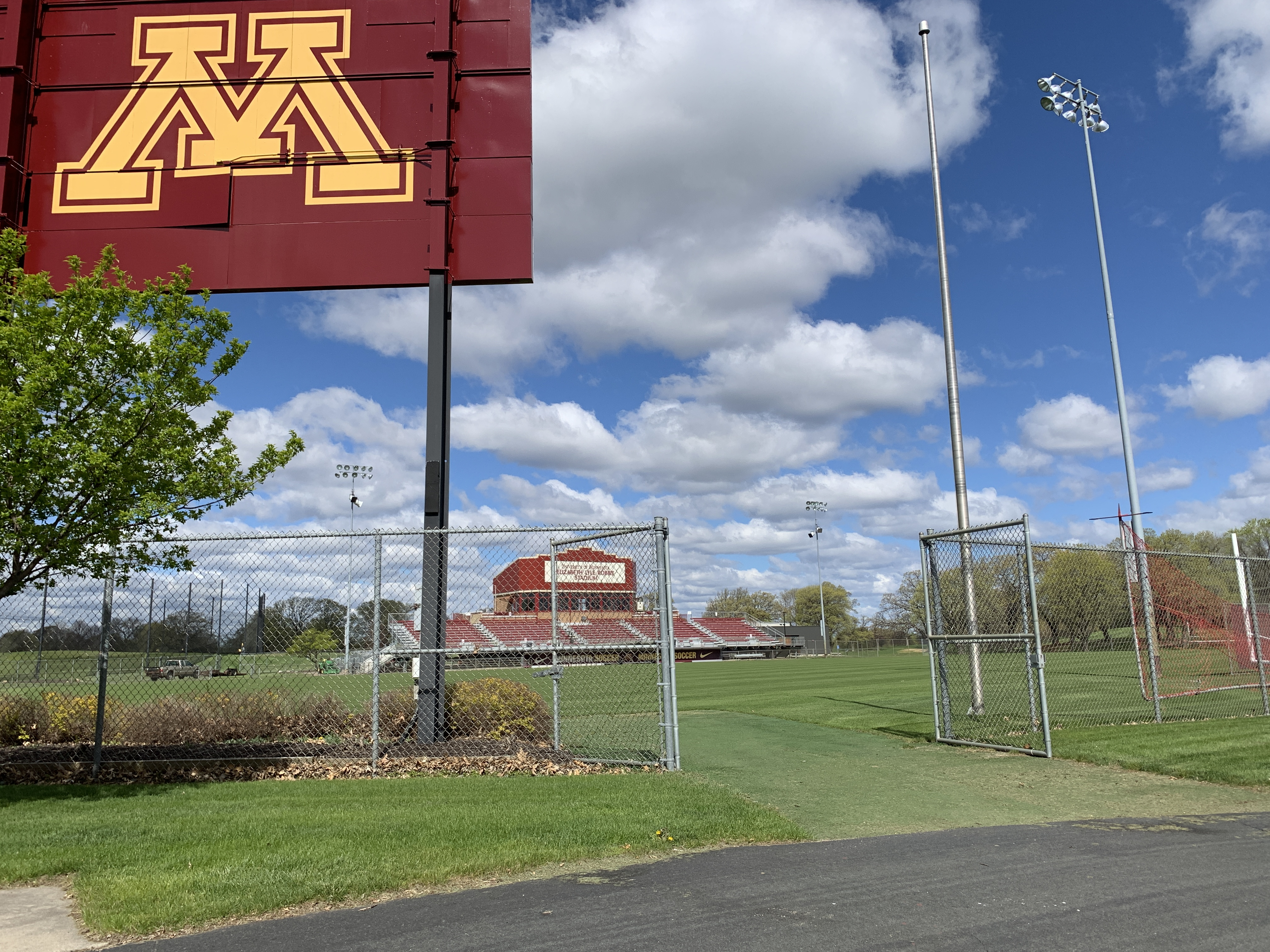
- View of the stadium in 2021
- Interactive map of Elizabeth Lyle Robbie Stadium
- Address: 1745 Cleveland Avenue; Falcon Heights, Minnesota; United States
- Coordinates: 44°59′40″N 93°11′19″W
- Owner: University of Minnesota
- Operator: University of Minnesota Athletics
- Capacity: 1,000
- Type: Stadium
- Record attendance: Soccer: 1,758

Construction
- Opened: 1999; 27 years ago
- Cost: $2,1 million

Tenants
- Minnesota Golden Gophers (NCAA) teams: women's soccer (1999-present)

Website
- gophersports.com/soccer-robbie-stadium

Elizabeth Lyle Robbie Stadium is a soccer-specific stadium located in Falcon Heights on the Saint Paul campus of the University of Minnesota. It is primarily used as the home of the Minnesota Golden Gophers' women's soccer team. The stadium opened in 1999 and seats 1,000.

The stadium is named after Elizabeth Lyle Robbie, who became the first female owner of a professional sports franchise in the United States after she purchased the Miami Toros team in the mid-'70s. Lyle was also the wife of Joe Robbie, former owner of the Miami Dolphins. The Robbie family was originally from South Dakota, but lived a number of years in Minneapolis. Elizabeth was the first female owner of a professional sports franchise in the United States, as she owned the Miami Toros / Minnesota Strikers soccer team in the 1970s and 1980s.

Prior to Robbie Stadium, the school played home games from 1993 to 1998 at the "St. Paul Campus Soccer Field", also located in Falcon Heights.
