= Ohio State Buckeyes women's soccer =

American college soccer team

- Founded: 1993
- University: Ohio State University
- Head coach: Lori Walker-Hock (30th season)
- Conference: Big Ten
- Location: Columbus, Ohio, US
- Stadium: Jesse Owens Memorial Stadium (capacity: 7,000)
- Nickname: Buckeyes
- Colors: Scarlet and gray

NCAA tournament College Cup
- 2010

NCAA tournament Quarterfinals
- 2004, 2010, 2025

NCAA tournament Round of 16
- 2004, 2010, 2011, 2015, 2024, 2025

NCAA tournament Round of 32
- 2003, 2004, 2010, 2011, 2015, 2016, 2020, 2022, 2024, 2025

NCAA tournament appearances
- 2002, 2003, 2004, 2007, 2009, 2010, 2011, 2012, 2013, 2015, 2016, 2017, 2018, 2020, 2021, 2022, 2023, 2024, 2025, 2026

Conference tournament championships
- 2002, 2004, 2012

Conference regular season championships
- 2010, 2017. 2026

The Ohio State Buckeyes women's soccer team represents Ohio State University in NCAA Division I college soccer. The Buckeyes are led by head coach Lori Walker-Hock.

== History ==
The Ohio State women's soccer program began in 1993.

The Buckeyes have been to the NCAA tournament 19 times in program history.

== Current squad ==
As of November 2026

Note: Flags indicate national team as defined under FIFA eligibility rules; some limited exceptions apply. Players may hold more than one non-FIFA nationality.

No.	Pos.	Nation	Player
0	GK	USA	Lizzie Rozmajzl
00	GK	USA	Pavitra Karnati
1	GK	USA	Peighton Northrup
2	MF	USA	Amanda Schlueter
3	DF	USA	Mia McSweeney
4	DF	USA	Ava Bramblett
5	MF	USA	Alexis Knisely
6	DF	FIN	Nette-Nina Hiltunen
7	FW	USA	Lily Danner
8	MF	CAN	Ava Greco
9	FW	USA	Jadin Bonham
10	MF	USA	Elle Britt
11	DF	USA	Jacinda Bonham
12	DF	USA	Micayla Decker

No.	Pos.	Nation	Player
14	DF	USA	Mai Ly Marella
15	MF	USA	Berkley Mape
16	MF	USA	Natalie Garcia
17	FW	USA	Maliyah Morrison
18	DF	USA	Anika Poremba
19	MF	USA	Andrea Lu
20	MF	USA	Riley Lijewski
21	FW	USA	Isla Eaton
22	FW	USA	Reese Brown
23	MF	USA	Sofia Goetter
24	FW	USA	Callie Tumilty
25	FW	USA	Mia Stevens
29	FW	USA	Sydney Bering

== Awards and honors ==
=== Big Ten Midfielder of the Year ===
- Nikki Walts – 2017

=== Big Ten Defender of the Year ===
- Morgan Wolcott – 2017
- Izzy Rodriguez – 2020

=== Big Ten Goaltender of the Year ===
- Devon Kerr – 2018

=== Big Ten Offensive Player of the Year ===
- Paige Maxwell – 2010

=== Big Ten Defensive Player of the Year ===
- Cassie Dickerson – 2010

=== Big Ten Freshman of the Year ===
- Jennifer Plante – 1995
- Lisa Grubb – 2001
- Lara Dickenmann – 2004
- Peyton McNamara – 2020

=== Big Ten Medal of Honor ===
- Becky Borchers – 1999
- Cassie Dickerson – 2010
- Izzy Rodriguez – 2022

=== Big Ten Coach of the Year ===
- Lori Walker – 2001, 2010, 2017
