= Macy Enneking =

American soccer player (born 2001)

Personal information
- Full name: Macy Elizabeth Enneking
- Date of birth: September 25, 2001 (age 25)
- Place of birth: Columbus, Ohio, U.S.
- Height: 5 ft 9 in (1.75 m)
- Position: Goalkeeper

Team information
- Current team: Michigan Wolverines (director of operations)

Youth career
- Ohio Premier SC

College career
Years	Team	Apps	(Gls)
2020–2024	Iowa Hawkeyes	67	(0)

Senior career*
Years	Team	Apps	(Gls)
2025	FH	13	(0)
- * Club domestic league appearances and goals

Macy Elizabeth Enneking (born September 25, 2001) is an American former professional soccer player. She played college soccer for the Iowa Hawkeyes, setting the program record for career shutouts. She played one season professionally for Icelandic club FH.

== Early life ==
Enneking was born in Columbus, Ohio, to Mike and Lisa Enneking, and has two siblings. She began playing soccer as a goalkeeper at age four. She attended Hilliard Bradley High School in Hilliard, Ohio, where she played as a forward on the soccer team, while playing in goal for ECNL club team Ohio Premier Soccer Club.

== College career ==
Enneking became the starting goalkeeper for the Iowa Hawkeyes in the second half of her freshman season in 2020, leading the Big Ten Conference in goals against average and keeping 6 clean sheets in 10 games. She made 14 saves to keep shutouts during the last two rounds of the Big Ten tournament, leading the Hawkeyes to their first conference title in program history, and was named the most outstanding defensive player of the tournament. Iowa won their opening match at the NCAA tournament for the first time. Enneking split duties with Monica Wilhelm during the next two seasons, recording 3 clean sheets in 11 starts. She missed a month and a half of her junior season due to nose and orbital fractures.

Enneking became team captain and started every game in her senior season in 2023, keeping a program-record 12.5 clean sheets in 22 games. She led Iowa to their second Big Ten tournament title, allowing only one goal in three games. That off-season, Iowa introduced virtual reality headsets for goalkeeper training. In her fifth season in Iowa City, Enneking made a career-high 59 saves and kept 11.5 clean sheets in 22 games, helping Iowa make the third round of the NCAA tournament for the first time and set a program record with 15 wins. She left Iowa as the program leader in career wins (41) and shutouts (33.5) and fifth in career saves (226).

== Club career ==
Enneking joined the NWSL's Seattle Reign FC as a non-roster trialist in the 2025 preseason, but was not signed to a contract. In June, she played for Austin Rise FC at the Soccer Tournament 2025. The following month, she signed her first professional contract with Icelandic club FH, who had brought Iceland legend Sandra Sigurðardóttir out of retirement after an injury crisis at the goalkeeper position. She immediately took the starting job and made her professional debut in a 3–1 win over Fram on July 25. She helped the club to their first appearance in the Icelandic Women's Football Cup final, losing 3–2 to Breiðablik in extra time. She made 15 appearances in all competitions as FH placed second in the league.

== Post-playing career ==
Enneking became the director of operations for the Michigan Wolverines in 2026, reuniting with former Iowa head coach Dave DiIanni in his first season at Michigan.

== Honors and awards ==
Iowa Hawkeyes

- Big Ten women's soccer tournament: 2020, 2023

Individual

- Big Ten all-freshman team: 2020
- Big Ten tournament Defensive MVP: 2020
- Big Ten tournament all-tournament team: 2020, 2023, 2024
