= 2023 Big Ten women's soccer tournament =

Postseason women's soccer tournament

- Classification: Division I
- Teams: 8
- Matches: 7
- Attendance: 4,504
- Quarterfinals site: Higher seeds Campus Sites
- Semifinals site: Lower.com Field; Columbus, Ohio
- Finals site: Lower.com Field; Columbus, Ohio
- Champions: Iowa (2nd title)
- Winning coach: Dave DiIanni (2nd title)
- MVP: Emma Jaskaniec (Offensive); Samantha Cary (Defensive) (Wisconsin; Iowa)
- Broadcast: BTN

2023 Big Ten Conference women's soccer standings
	Conf.						Overall
Team	W		L		T	PCT	W		L		T	PCT
No. 7 Nebraska ‍†‍‍^{y}	7	–	1	–	2	.800	14	–	3	–	3	.775
No. 12 Michigan State ‍†‍‍^{y}	7	–	1	–	2	.800	14	–	4	–	3	.738
No. 19 Wisconsin ‍‍‍^{y}	7	–	2	–	1	.750	14	–	4	–	4	.727
No. 5 Penn State ‍‍‍^{y}	6	–	1	–	3	.750	14	–	2	–	4	.800
Indiana ‍‍‍^{y}	6	–	2	–	2	.700	12	–	4	–	4	.700
Rutgers ‍‍‍^{y}	5	–	4	–	1	.550	9	–	7	–	4	.550
Ohio State ‍‍‍^{y}	5	–	4	–	1	.550	9	–	8	–	3	.525
No. 24 Iowa ‍‍‡‍^{y}	3	–	4	–	3	.450	13	–	4	–	4	.714
Northwestern ‍‍‍	3	–	5	–	2	.400	9	–	5	–	4	.611
Minnesota ‍‍‍	3	–	5	–	2	.400	7	–	6	–	4	.529
Michigan ‍‍‍^{y}	3	–	5	–	2	.400	7	–	7	–	4	.500
Illinois ‍‍‍	2	–	6	–	2	.300	6	–	8	–	3	.441
Purdue ‍‍‍	0	–	8	–	2	.100	3	–	13	–	2	.222
Maryland ‍‍‍	0	–	9	–	1	.050	3	–	10	–	5	.306
† – Conference champion ‡ – 2023 Big Ten Tournament champion y – Invited to the NCAA Tournament; As of December 5, 2023; Rankings from United Soccer Coaches Poll; Source: Big Ten

The 2023 Big Ten women's soccer tournament was the postseason women's soccer tournament for the Big Ten Conference held from October 29 through November 5, 2023. The tournament was hosted by the higher seeded team for the Quarterfinals and then at Lower.com Field in Columbus, Ohio for the Semifinals and Final. The eight team-team single-elimination tournament consisted of two rounds based on seeding from regular season conference play. Penn State were the defending champions, and they were unable to defend their crown, as they lost in the Semifinals to Iowa. Iowa went on to win the tournament with a 1–0 victory over Wisconsin in the Final. The conference tournament title was the second for the Iowa women's soccer program, both of which have come under head coach Dave DiIanni. As tournament champions, Iowa earned the Big Ten's automatic berth into the 2023 NCAA Division I women's soccer tournament.

== Seeding ==
The top eight teams in the regular season earned a spot in the tournament. Tiebreakers were required to determine the first and second seeds and the sixth and seventh seeds for the tournament. Michigan State and Nebraska tied for first place with 7–1–2 records during regular season conference play. The teams did not play during the regular season and both had seven wins in conference games so the third tiebreaker of best record versus mutually played conference teams was used. Michigan State earned the first seed and Nebraska earned the second seed. Rutgers and Ohio State tied for sixth as both finished with 5–4–1 conference records. Rutgers earned the sixth seed by virtue of their 1–0 win over Ohio State on October 19.

Seed	School	Conference	Points
1	Michigan State	7–1–2	23
2	Nebraska	7–1–2	23
3	Wisconsin	7–2–1	22
4	Penn State	6–1–3	21
5	Indiana	6–2–2	20
6	Rutgers	5–4–1	16
7	Ohio State	5–4–1	16
8	Iowa	3–4–3	12

== Bracket ==
Quarterfinals; October 29
1	Michigan State	1
8	Iowa	2
4	Penn State	3
5	Indiana	0
3	Wisconsin (pen.)	0 (4)
6	Rutgers	0 (1)
2	Nebraska	3
7	Ohio State	2

Semifinals; November 2
8	Iowa (a.e.t.)	1
4	Penn State	0
3	Wisconsin	3
2	Nebraska	1

Championship; November 5
8	Iowa	1
3	Wisconsin	0

== Schedule ==
=== Quarterfinals ===
October 29	#1 Michigan State	1–2	#8 Iowa	East Lansing, MI
1:00 p.m. ET	Emerson Sargeant 42'	Report	(yellow card) 24' Eva Pattison; 50', (yellow card) 89' Kelli McGroarty; 55' Sofia Bush; (yellow card) 73' Addoe Bundy	Stadium: DeMartin Soccer Complex; Attendance: 1,851; Referee: Nicole Green; Assistant referees: Jake Brochu; Steve Seward; Fourth official: Joshua Abts

October 29	#4 Penn State	3–0	#5 Indiana	State College, PA
1:00 p.m. ET	Eva Alonso 21'; Amelia White 25'; Kaitlyn MacBean 52'	Report	(yellow card) 70' Camille Hamm; (yellow card) 72' Olivia Rush	Stadium: Jeffrey Field; Attendance: 532; Referee: Sergio Gonzalez; Assistant referees: Max Campbell; Terrence Mull; Fourth official: Cody Hack

October 29	#2 Nebraska	3–2	#7 Ohio State	Lincoln, NE
2:00 p.m. ET	Eleanor Dale 33', 64'; Sarah Weber 36'	Report	35' Amanda Schlueter; 55' Ava Bramblett	Stadium: Barbara Hibner Field; Attendance: 1,227; Referee: Shane Butler; Assistant referees: Brittney Hageman; Bes Miloshi; Fourth official: TJ Bartels

October 29	#3 Wisconsin	0–0 (a.e.t.) (4–1 p)	#6 Rutgers	Madison, WI
3:30 p.m. ET		Report	(yellow card) 101' Kylie Daigle	Stadium: McClimon Field; Attendance: 894
	Penalties
	Aryssa Mahrt (penalty scored); Emma Jaskaniec (penalty scored); Hailey Baumann (penalty scored); Ashley Martinez (penalty scored)		(penalty missed) Sam Kroeger; (penalty missed) Kylie Diagle; (penalty scored) Allison Lowrey

=== Semifinals ===
November 2	#2 Nebraska	1–3	#3 Wisconsin	Columbus, OH
5:00 p.m. ET	Sarah Weber 27'	Report	16' Aryssa Mahrt; 52' Emma Jaskaniec; 83' Mia Richters	Stadium: Lower.com Field

November 2	#4 Penn State	0–1 (a.e.t.)	#8 Iowa	Columbus, OH
7:30 p.m. ET	Elle Kershner (yellow card) 86'	Report	(yellow card) 13' Maggie Johnston; 95' Kelli McGroarty	Stadium: Lower.com Field; Referee: Herbert Estrada; Assistant referees: Jacob Little; Christian Little; Fourth official: Kevin Fikar

=== Final ===
November 5	#3 Wisconsin	0–1	#8 Iowa	Columbus, OH
2:00 p.m. ET	Ashley Martinez (yellow card) 71'	Report	18' (pen.) Josie Durr	Stadium: Lower.com Field; Referee: Ceasar Ibarra; Assistant referees: Khalaf Al-Lafayeh Malkawi; Courtney Hayworth; Fourth official: Saki Atsas

== Statistics ==
=== Goalscorers ===
There were 17 goals scored in 7 matches, for an average of 2.43 goals per match (as of November 5, 2023).

2 goals

- Kelli McGroaty – Iowa
- Eleanor Dale – Nebraska
- Sarah Weber – Nebraska

1 goal

- Sofia Bush – Iowa
- Josie Durr – Iowa
- Emerson Sargeant – Michigan State
- Ava Bramblett – Ohio State
- Amanda Schlueter – Ohio State
- Eva Alonso – Penn State
- Kaitlyn MacBean – Penn State
- Amelia White – Penn State
- Emma Jaskaniec – Wisconsin
- Aryssa Mahrt – Wisconsin
- Mia Richters – Wisconsin

== All-Tournament team ==
Player	Team
Piper Coffield	Indiana
Samantha Cary^	Iowa
Macy Enneking	Iowa
Kelli McGroarty	Iowa
Sarah Weber	Nebraska
Peyton McNamara	Ohio State
Kate Wiesner	Penn State
Riley Tiernan	Rutgers
Emma Jaskaniec*	Wisconsin
Aryssa Mahrt	Wisconsin

* Offensive MVP
^ Defensive MVP
