= Lauren DeBeau =

American soccer player

Personal information
- Full name: Lauren Jacqueline DeBeau
- Height: 5 ft 4 in (1.63 m)
- Position: Forward

Youth career
- Vardar ECNL
- Carpathia Kickers

College career
| Years | Team | Apps | (Gls) |
| 2019–2021 | Central Michigan Chippewas | 24 | (4) |
| 2021–2022 | Michigan State Spartans | 40 | (13) |

Lauren Jacqueline DeBeau is an American former soccer player who played as a forward. She played college soccer for the Central Michigan Chippewas and the Michigan State Spartans, earning Big Ten Forward of the Year and second-team All-American honors at Michigan State in 2022. She was selected by Portland Thorns FC in the second round of the 2023 NWSL Draft.

== Early life ==
DeBeau grew up in Shelby Township, Michigan, where she began playing soccer at the age of 5. She played two years of Elite Clubs National League soccer with Vardar ECNL before joining the Carpathia Kickers for the next eight years. She attended Eisenhower High School, where she earned multiple all-county, all-region, and all-state honors; she recorded 63 goals and 41 assists across her Eisenhower career. DeBeau also played four years of varsity basketball in high school and had aspirations to take her basketball career to the collegiate level as well. She was a two-year team captain for both the soccer and basketball teams.

== College career ==
=== Central Michigan Chippewas ===
In her first season playing college soccer in 2019, DeBeau competed in the Mid-American Conference with the Central Michigan Chippewas. She was named to the conference's All-Freshman team after starting in all but one of her 17 appearances and ranking second in goals for the Chippewas. The following season, which was played in the spring of 2021 due to the COVID-19 pandemic, was a quieter campaign for DeBeau. Despite having the third-most shots on the team, she only recorded one goal contribution on the year. She entered the NCAA transfer portal ahead of the 2021 fall season, feeling Central Michigan "wasn't working out" for her on the pitch.

=== Michigan State Spartans ===
DeBeau soon transferred to Michigan State University, where her mother had graduated from previously. In the fall of 2021, she started all 18 of the Spartans' games and scored two goals (both of which were game-winners). As a senior, DeBeau had a breakout season. She led the team with 11 goals, including a hat-trick in eleven minutes against Illinois in September 2022. She helped Michigan State win the Big Ten regular season title and finish the ensuing Big Ten tournament as runners-up. In the Big Ten tournament championship match, DeBeau scored one of two goals for Michigan State as the Spartans were defeated by Penn State; she was then named to the Big Ten tournament all-tournament team for her efforts. Five days after the Penn State defeat, now in the NCAA tournament, DeBeau assisted Camryn Miller's double-overtime game-winner against Milwaukee to send Michigan State to the second round of the competition for the third time in history. At the end of the year, DeBeau was unanimously selected to the All-Big Ten first team. She was also named the Big Ten Forward of the Year and a second-team All-American.

== Club career ==
DeBeau, alongside Michigan State teammate Lauren Kozal, were selected by the Portland Thorns in the 2023 NWSL Draft. DeBeau was the final pick of the draft's second round, becoming the 24th overall selection. She attended the Thorns' preseason training camp, but was released ahead of the 2023 NWSL season.

== Personal life ==
DeBeau is a passionate fan of boy band Big Time Rush. She has posed with Big Time Rush's flag in multiple of her Michigan State Spartans official photos.

== Honors and awards ==
Michigan State Spartans

- Big Ten Conference: 2022

Individual

- Second-team All-American: 2022
- First-team All-Big Ten: 2022
- Mid-American All-Freshman team: 2019
- Big Ten tournament all-tournament team: 2022
- Big Ten Forward of the Year: 2022
