= 2012 Penn State Nittany Lions women's soccer team =

2012 Penn State Nittany Lions women's soccer

Big Ten Regular Season Champion

NCAA, Runner Up
- Conference: Big Ten Conference
- U. Soc. Coaches poll: No. 2
- Record: 21–4–2 (10–0–1 Big Ten)
- Head coach: Erica Dambach (6th season)
- Home stadium: Jeffrey Field

The 2012 Penn State Nittany Lions women's soccer team represented Pennsylvania State University during the 2012 NCAA Division I women's soccer season and the 2012 Big Ten Conference women's soccer season. It was the program's 19th season fielding a women's varsity soccer team, and their 19th season in the Big Ten Conference. The 2012 season was Erica Dambach's 6th year at the helm. During the season the Nittany Lions lifted their 15th consecutive Big Ten regular season title with a 10-0-1 record. The squad played in their first NCAA National Championship against North Carolina at Torero Stadium, losing 4–1. Erica Dambach was awarded with Coach of the Year from United Soccer Coaches and Soccer America; Maya Hayes and Christine Nairn were named first team All-Americans.

== Background ==
Penn State head coach Erica Dambach, who also served as an assistant coach to the United States Women's National team, won Gold in the 2012 Olympics before returning for the start of the season. In one of the opening matches of the 2012 season, hosting defending national champion No. 1 Stanford, Penn State set a Jeffrey Field attendance record seeing 5,117 fans in the crowd. Maya Hayes and Taylor Schram returned to the team in late September after winning the 2012 U-20 Women's World Cup with the United States. Finishing the Big Ten regular season 10-0-1 the Nittany Lions lifted their 15th consecutive Big Ten regular season title. Receiving the No. 1 bid in the Big Ten tournament the team would eventually fall in the semifinals to Illinois. Penn State received an at-large, 1st seed bid to the 2012 NCAA Tournament, opening the competition by defeating Long Island University Brooklyn. On the way to the finals, Penn State would face and defeat Boston College, Michigan, Duke and Florida State. Penn State played in their first NCAA National Championship against North Carolina at Torero Stadium. Tied 1–1 at half North Carolina went on to score three unanswered seeing the Nittany Lions fall 4–1. The Nittany Lions received 5 of 6 possible individual awards from the Big Ten: Maya Hayes named Forward of the Year, Erica Dambach named Coach of the Year, Christine Nairn named Midfielder of the Year, Whit Church named Defensive Player of the Year and Raquel Rodriguez named Freshman of the Year. Nationally, Erica Dambach was awarded with Coach of the Year from United Soccer Coaches and Soccer America; Maya Hayes and Christine Nairn were also named first team All-Americans.

== Squad ==
=== Roster ===
As of August 5, 2012

Note: Flags indicate national team as defined under FIFA eligibility rules; some limited exceptions apply. Players may hold more than one non-FIFA nationality.

No.	Pos.	Nation	Player
0	GK	(United States) USA	Kristin Hartmann
00	GK	(United States) USA	Erin McNulty
1	GK	(United States) USA	Tara Barr
2	MF	(United States) USA	Megan Ritchey
3	MF	(United States) USA	Emily Hurd
4	DF	(Canada) CAN	Lexi Marton
5	FW	(United States) USA	Maya Hayes
6	MF	(United States) USA	Jackie Molinda
7	MF	(United States) USA	Corey Persson
8	DF	(United States) USA	Jenna Kalwa
9	DF	(United States) USA	Bri Garcia
10	MF	(United States) USA	Christine Nairn
11	FW	(Costa Rica) CRC	Raquel Rodriguez

No.	Pos.	Nation	Player
12	MF	(United States) USA	Kindrah Kohne
14	FW	(United States) USA	Kori Chapic
15	DF	(United States) USA	Erin Kehoe
16	FW	(United States) USA	Mallory Weber
17	DF	(United States) USA	Whitney Church
18	MF	(United States) USA	Maddy Evans
19	FW	(United States) USA	Taylor Schram
20	GK	(United States) USA	Meghan Kaminski
21	DF	(United States) USA	Teddy Chase
22	FW	(United States) USA	Tani Costa
23	DF	(United States) USA	Bri Hovington
24	MF	(United States) USA	Amanda Dotten
25	MF	(United States) USA	Mallory Peterson
28	GK	(United States) USA	Britt Eckerstrom

== Schedule ==
Date Time, TV	Rank^{#}	Opponent^{#}	Result	Record	Site (Attendance) City, State
Pre-season
August 17*; 7:00 p.m.	No. 9	No. 7 Virginia	W 3–1	1–0–0 (0–0–0)	Klöckner Stadium (1130); Charlottesville, VA
August 19*; 7:30 p.m.	No. 9	St. John's	W 5–0	2–0–0 (0–0–0)	Jeffrey Field (709); State College, PA
August 24*; 2:30 p.m.	No. 6	No. 1 Stanford	L 2–3	2–1–0 (0–0–0)	Jeffrey Field (5117); State College, PA
August 26*; 2:30 p.m.	No. 6	Central Michigan	W 5–0	3–1–0 (0–0–0)	Jeffrey Field (843); State College, PA
August 31*; 7:00 p.m.	No. 6	at No. 24 West Virginia	W 1-1 ^{2-1}	4–1–0 (0–0–0)	Dick Dlesk Soccer Stadium (2057); Morgantown, WV
September 2*; 2:30 p.m.	No. 6	at vs. Pittsburgh	W 3-0	5–1–0 (0–0–0)	Dick Dlesk Soccer Stadium (702); Morgantown, WV
September 8*; 9:00 p.m.	No. 6	at No. 24 BYU	L 3–1	5–2–0 (0–0–0)	South Field (4922); Provo, UT
Regular season
September 16; 1:00 p.m.	No. 11	No. 13 Wisconsin	W 2–1	6–2–0 (1–0–0)	Jeffrey Field (994); State College, PA
September 21; 8:00 p.m.	No. 11	at Northwestern	W 4-1	7–2–0 (2–0–0)	Lanny and Sharon Martin Stadium (196); Evanston, IL
September 23; 1:00 p.m.	No. 11	at Illinois	W 4-0	8–2–0 (3–0–0)	Demirjian Park; Champaign, IL
September 27; 8:00 p.m.	No. 8	at Ohio State	W 3-0	9–2–0 (4–0–0)	Jesse Owens Memorial Stadium (419); Columbus, OH
September 30; 12:00 p.m.	No. 8	Minnesota	W 4-3	10–2–0 (5–0–0)	Jeffrey Field (1257); State College, PA
October 2*; 7:00 p.m.	No. 4	Bucknell	W 3-1	11–2–0 (5–0–0)	Jeffrey Field (623); State College, PA
October 7; 1:00 p.m.	No. 4	Indiana	W 5-2	12–2–0 (6–0–0)	Jeffrey Field (919); State College, PA
October 12; 5:00 p.m.	No. 4	at Nebraska	W 4-0	13–2–0 (7–0–0)	Hibner Stadium (322); Lincoln, NE
October 21; 7:00 p.m.	No. 4	at Iowa	W 2-1	14–2–0 (8–0–0)	UI Soccer Complex (250); Iowa City, IA
October 19; 7:00 p.m.	No. 4	Michigan State	W 5-1	15–2–0 (9–0–0)	Jeffrey Field (2606); State College, PA
October 21; 1:00 p.m.	No. 4	No. 17 Michigan	T 1-1	15–1–2 (9–0–1)	Jeffrey Field (2606); State College, PA
October 26; 7:00 p.m.	No. 4	at Purdue	W 2-0	16–2–1 (10–0–1)	Folk Field (2606); West Lafayette, IN
Big Ten Tournament
October 31; 1:30 p.m.	No. 4 (6)	vs. No. (8) Iowa; First Round	W 2-0	17–2–1 (10–0–1)	Armstrong Stadium; Bloomington, IN
November 2; 10:00 a.m.	No. 4 (1)	vs. No. (3) Illinois; Semi-final	L 0-1	17–3–2 (10–0–1)	Armstrong Stadium; Bloomington, IN
NCAA Tournament
November 10*; 6:00 p.m.	No. 4 (1)	LIU Brooklyn; First Round	W 4-0	18–2–2 (10–0–1)	Jeffrey Field (1438); State College, PA
November 16*; 6:00 p.m.	No. 5 (1)	Boston College; Second Round	W 5-2	19–2–2 (10–0–1)	Jeffrey Field (1258); State College, PA
November 18*; 7:00 p.m.	No. 5 (1)	Michigan; Round of 16	T 1-1 ^{2-0 PK}	19–3–2 (10–0–1)	Jeffrey Field (647); State College, PA
November 23*; 6:00 p.m.	No. 5 (1)	No. 19 (3) Duke; Quarterfinals	W 1-0	20–3–2 (10–0–1)	Jeffrey Field (1794); State College, PA
November 30*; 6:00 p.m.	No. 5 (1)	vs. No. 7 (1) Florida State; College Cup Semifinals	W 1-1 ^{2-1}	21–3–2 (10–0–1)	Torero Stadium; San Diego, CA
December 2*; 6:00 p.m.	No. 5 (1)	vs. No. 13 (2) North Carolina; College Cup Championship	L 1-4	21–4–2 (10–0–1)	Torero Stadium; San Diego, CA
*Non-conference game. ^{#}Rankings from United Soccer Coaches. (#) Tournament seedings in parentheses.

Source:Penn State Athletics
