= 2026 DC Power FC fall season =

American women's soccer team season

DC Power FC
2026 season
- Head coach: Omid Namazi
- Stadium: Audi Field, Washington, D.C.

The 2026 fall season of DC Power FC is the team's third season as a professional women's soccer team, being one of eight charter clubs in the USL Super League (USLS).

== Team ==
=== Current roster ===
As of October 11, 2026

Note: Flags indicate national team as defined under FIFA eligibility rules; some limited exceptions apply. Players may hold more than one non-FIFA nationality.

No.	Pos.	Nation	Player
1	GK	USA	Katie Cappelletti
2	MF	USA	Anna Bagley
3	DF	USA	Susanna Fitch
4	DF	USA	Sarah McCoy
5	MF	USA	Emily Colton
6	DF	GUY	Sydney Cummings
7	MF	USA	Tatum Thomason
8	MF	USA	Abby Boyan
9	FW	USA	Kayla Colbert
10	FW	USA	Tyler Lussi
11	FW	USA	Alyssa Walker
12	DF	HAI	Claire Constant

No.	Pos.	Nation	Player
13	FW	USA	Gianna Gourley
16	MF	USA	Ellie Gilbert
17	FW	USA	Mak Whitham (on loan from Gotham FC)
18	MF	USA	Emma Jaskaniec
21	MF	USA	Tati Fung (on loan from Lexington SC)
22	DF	USA	Paige Almendariz
23	MF	USA	Justina Gaynor
25	DF	USA	Sam Angel (on loan from Chicago Stars FC)
28	DF	USA	Hallie Augustyn
30	FW	ETH	Loza Abera
43	GK	USA	Makenna Gottschalk

=== Coaching staff ===
As of July 30, 2025

Front Office
Position	Name
Club President	(United States) Jordan Stuart
Sporting Director / General Manager	(United States) Steve Birnbaum
Chief Financial Officer	(United States) Dan Franceschini
Chief Legal Officer	(United States) Jessica Wright
Technical Staff
Position	Name
Head Coach	(United States) Omid Namazi
Assistant Coach	(United States) Zaneta Wyne
Assistant Coach	(El Salvador) Pablo Amaya
Head of Goalkeeping	(United States) Brian Periman
Performance Coach	(Peru) Tabitha Galliani
Vice President of Team Operations	(England) Bircan Mustafa
Head Athletic Trainer	(United States) Emily Gumowitz
Head of Equipment	(United States) Nicole Miller
Mental Performance	(United States) Gaelin Hirabayashi

== Competitions ==
Win Draw Loss

15 August 2026 1	DC Power	0–1	Carolina Ascent FC	Audi Field
		Report	Corbin 35'	Attendance: 1,519; Referee: Kaitlyn Trowbridge

22 August 2026 2	Brooklyn FC	1–4	DC Power FC	Maimonides Park
	Thompson 75'	Report	Jaskaniec 6'; Abera 8' 83' (pen.); Lussi 61' (pen.)	Attendance: 660; Referee: Jamie Padilla

29 August 2026 3	Lexington SC	1–2	DC Power FC	Lexington SC Stadium
	Midgley 90+4'	Report	Abera 45+2'; Colton 67'	Attendance: 4,311; Referee: Patricia McCracken

4 September 2026 4	DC Power FC	1–1	Sporting JAX	Washington, D.C.
7:00 PM ET	Constant 59' (yellow card) 86'	Report	Illig 63'	Stadium: Audi Field; Attendance: 1,381; Referee: Lauren Aldrich

13 September 2026 5	Dallas Trinity FC	2–1	DC Power	Cotton Bowl
	Gamero 42'; Hamid 56'	Report	Brewer 66' (o.g.)	Attendance: 1,451; Referee: Adorae Monroy

18 September 2026 6	DC Power	1–1	Tampa Bay Sun FC	Audi Field
	Jaskaniec 70'	Report	Connors 62'	Attendance: 1,399; Referee: Kelsey Harms

22 September 2026 7	DC Power FC	2–1	Fort Lauderdale United FC	Audi Field
	Thomason 62', 89'	Report	Hugh 67'	Attendance: 758; Referee: Marie Durr

16 October 2026 8	Carolina Ascent FC	1–0	DC Power	American Legion Memorial Stadium
	Baisden 8'	Report		Attendance: 2,400; Referee: Iryna Petrunok

25 October 2026 9	DC Power	1–0	Dallas Trinity FC	Audi Field
	Colton 10'	Report		Attendance: 1,403; Referee: Dorian Del Toro

1 November 2026 10	Tampa Bay Sun FC	1–2	DC Power	Suncoast Credit Union Field
	Waldeck 83'	Report	Abera 42'; Walker 87'	Attendance: 1,465; Referee: José Lara

8 November, 2026 11	DC Power FC	2–1	Lexington SC	Audi Field
	Abera 18'; Colton 90+1'	Report	Barry 90+2'	Attendance: 1,425; Referee: Laadi Issaka

12 November, 2026 12	DC Power FC	4–0	Brooklyn FC	Audi Field
	Jaskaniec 10'; Abera 27'; Colbert 33'; Lussi 69'	Report		Attendance: 1,429; Referee: Atahan Yaya

15 November 2026 13	Sporting JAX	v	DC Power

28 November 2026 14	Fort Lauderdale United FC	v	DC Power

== Transactions ==
=== Contract operations ===
Date	Player	Pos.	Fee/notes	Ref.
June 5, 2026	(United States) Ellie Gilbert	MF	2026 contract option exercised.	
June 5, 2026	(United States) Makenna Gottschalk	GK	2026 contract option exercised.	
July 1, 2026	(Ethiopia) Loza Abera	FW	Re-signed through 2026.	
July 1, 2026	(United States) Anna Bagley	MF	Re-signed through 2026.	
July 6, 2026	(United States) Justina Gaynor	MF	Re-signed through 2027.	
July 9, 2026	(United States) Ellie Gilbert	MF	Club option exercised; extended through 2027.	
July 9, 2026	(United States) Makenna Gottschalk	GK	Club option exercised; extended through 2027.	

=== Transfers in ===
Date	Player	Pos.	Previous club	Fee/notes	Ref.
July 7, 2026	(United States) Katie Cappelletti	GK	(United States) Kansas City Current		
July 7, 2026	(United States) Emma Jaskaniec	MF	(United States) Spokane Zephyr		
July 7, 2026	(United States) Tyler Lussi	FW	(United States) Carolina Ascent		
July 7, 2026	(United States) Sarah McCoy	DF	(United States) Spokane Zephyr		
July 7, 2026	(United States) Tatum Thomason	MF	(United States) Arizona State Sun Devils	College signing	
July 9, 2026	(United States) Kayla Colbert	FW	(United States) Utah Royals		
July 29, 2026	(United States) Sam Angel	DF	(United States) Chicago Stars FC	Loan	
August 4, 2026	(United States) Mak Whitham	FW	(United States) Gotham FC	Loan	
August 6, 2026	(United States) Hallie Augustyn	DF	(United States) Baylor Bears	College signing	
August 6, 2026	(United States) Abby Boyan	MF	(United States) Sporting Club Jacksonville		
October 13, 2026	(United States) Tati Fung	MF	(United States) Lexington SC	Loan	

=== Transfers out ===
Date	Player	Pos.	Destination club	Fee/notes	Ref.
June 5, 2026	(United States) Morgan Aquino	GK	(Australia) Central Coast Mariners	Contract options declined; out of contract.	
June 5, 2026	(Philippines) Carleigh Frilles	MF	(Australia) Western Sydney Wanderers	Contract options declined; out of contract.	
June 5, 2026	(United States) Hannah Harney	FW		Contract options declined; out of contract.	
June 5, 2026	(United States) Kiki Maki	DF	(Denmark) Kolding IF	Contract options declined; out of contract.	
June 5, 2026	(United States) Madison Murnin	DF	(Sweden) Piteå IF	Contract options declined; out of contract.	
June 5, 2026	(Jamaica) Chinyelu Asher	MF		Out of contract.	
June 5, 2026	(Puerto Rico) Jaydah Bedoya	FW		Out of contract.	
June 5, 2026	(United States) Lexi Fraley	MF	Retirement	Out of contract.	
June 5, 2026	(Philippines) Katrina Guillou	MF	(Australia) Brisbane Roar	Out of contract.	
June 5, 2026	(United States) Alexis Theoret	MF	(United States) Tampa Bay Sun	Out of contract.	
June 5, 2026	(United States) Dasia Torbert	MF	(United States) Tampa Bay Sun	Out of contract.	
June 5, 2026	(Cameroon) Jeannette Yango	MF		Out of contract.	
