= Rashida Beal =

American soccer player

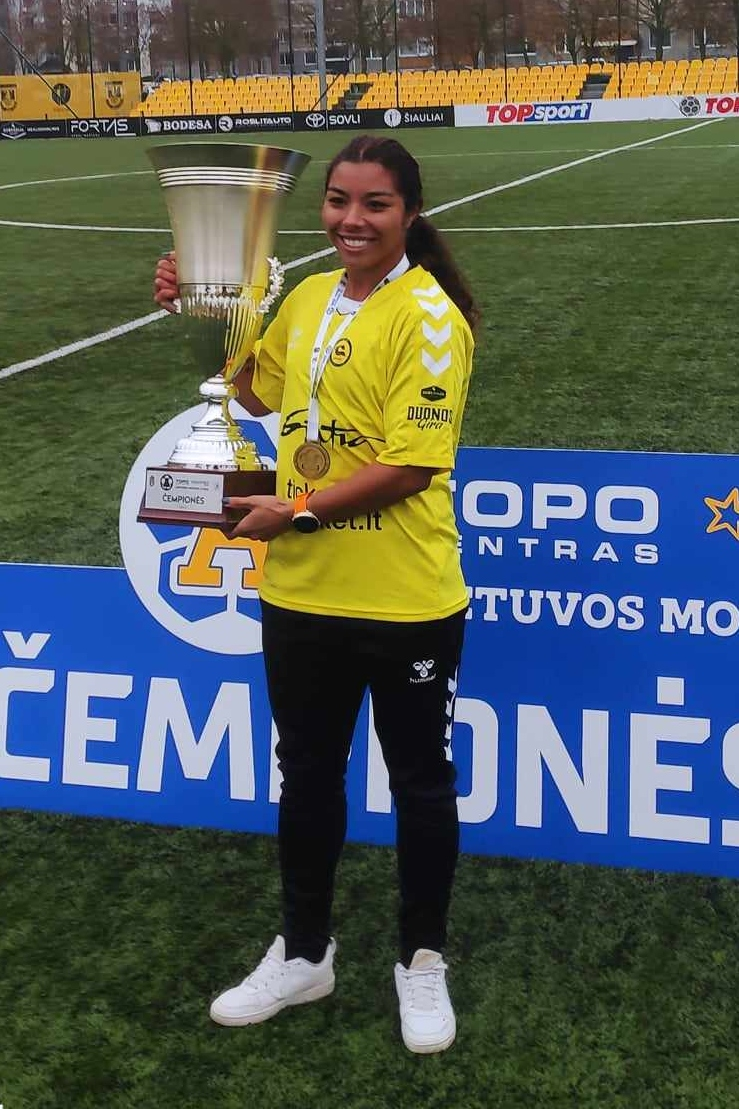

Personal information
- Full name: Rashida Marie Beal
- Date of birth: November 18, 1994 (age 31)
- Place of birth: Germantown, Wisconsin, U.S.
- Position: Defender

Team information
- Current team: KuPS

Youth career
- Germantown High School

College career
Years	Team	Apps	(Gls)
2013–2016	Minnesota Golden Gophers		

Senior career*
Years	Team	Apps	(Gls)
2017	FC Kansas City		
2020	BV Cloppenburg		
2021	FCU Olimpia Cluj		
2022–	Kdz. Ereğli Belediye Spor	39	(1)
2024–2025	FC Gintra	26	(1)
2026–	KuPS	0	(0)
- * Club domestic league appearances and goals as of 20 January 2026

Rashida Marie Beal (born November 18, 1994) is an American professional soccer player who plays as a defender for KuPS in the Kansallinen Liiga.

== Early years ==
Rashida Marie Beal was born in Germantown, Wisconsin, United States on November 18, 1994. She performed track athletics in the middle school. She finished Germantown High School in 2013. She studied Psychology with minor in Neuroscience at the University of Minnesota graduating in December 2016.

== Career ==
=== High school and college teams ===
Beal played two years for Germantown High School team, and four years for North Shore United AFC. She played college soccer for the Minnesota Golden Gophers. She was named Academic All-District in 2014 and 2015 and was selected to the NSCAA Scholar All-Region (Central) in 2015. In November 2016, she was named a First Team Academic All-American. She enjoyed the champion title of the Big Ten women's soccer tournament in 2016. She was named the 2016 Big Ten Defender of the Year.

=== FC Kansas City ===
After finishing the college, she was drafted by FC Kansas City in January 2017. Beal played soccer as a professional in her country 's National Women's Soccer League.

=== BV Cloppenburg (Germany) ===
Between February and June 2020, she was with the 2. Frauen-Bundesliga club BV Cloppenburg in Germany. By February 2021, she was called up to Kansas City NWSL for the 2021 Preseason.

=== FCU Olimpia Cluj (Romania) ===
In August 2021, she transferred to the Romanian league champion club FCU Olimpia Cluj to play in the 2021–22 UEFA Women's Champions League qualifying rounds. She appeared in two Champions League qualifying matches. She also appeared in several league games in the 2020/21 and 2021/22 season, including the 2020/21 Romanian Cup Championship.

=== Kdz. Ereğli Belediye Spor (Turkey) ===
In the beginning of 2022, she moved to Turkey and joined Kdz. Ereğli Belediye Spor to play in the second half of the 2021–22 Women's Super League. She played there for 2 more full seasons, appearing in nearly every match as a starting central defender.

=== Gintra (Lithuania) ===
In July 2024 she moved to lithuanian FC Gintra. where she competed in 2 Champions League Qualifying matches and several league games. She helped FC Gintra win the 2024 A Lyga Championship, marking their 20th championship in a row. In 2025 season also became 2025 A lyga champion.

=== KuPS ===
On 24 November 2025 Rashida Beal signed with KuPS (Finland) for 2026 season.

== Honors ==
Gintra

- moterų A lyga: 2024, 2025

Minnesota Golden Gophers

- Big Ten women's soccer tournament: 2016

Individual

- Academic All-District (2014, 2015)
- NSCAA Scholar All-Region (Central) (2015)
- First Team Academic All-American (2016)
- 2016 Big Ten Defender of the Year
- First Team All-Great Lakes Region
- First Team All-Big Ten
- Second Team All-American
