= Big Ten women's soccer tournament =

- Conference soccer championship
- Sport: College soccer
- Conference: Big Ten Conference
- Number of teams: 10
- Format: Single-elimination
- Current stadium: Energizer Park
- Current location: St. Louis, Missouri
- Played: 1994–2008; 2011–present
- Last contest: 2026
- Current champion: Purdue (2nd. title)
- Most championships: Penn State (9 titles)
- TV partner: BTN
- Official website: bigten.org/wsoc

The Big Ten women's soccer tournament is the conference championship tournament in soccer for the Big Ten Conference. The tournament is single-elimination format and seeding is based on regular season records. The top four highest-seeded teams host the quarterfinal matches and the highest remaining seed after the quarterfinal round. The highest remaining seeded teams following the quarterfinal round hosts the semifinals and likewise for the championship match.

The winner, declared conference champion, receives the conference's automatic bid to the NCAA Division I women's soccer championship. Penn State is the winningest team in championship history with 9 titles.

== Champions ==
Source: Big Ten (2023) and Big Ten (2025)

Key

- (1) – Title number
- a.e.t. – Match went to extra time
- p – Match decided by a penalty shootout after extra time
- – Winning team also won regular season

=== Finals ===
Ed.	Year	Champion	Score	Runner-up	Location	MVP (offensive)	MVP (defensive)
1	1994	Wisconsin (1)	3–0	Minnesota	McClimon Stadium • Madison, Wisconsin		
2	1995	Minnesota (1)	1–0	Wisconsin	Bill Armstrong Stadium • Bloomington, In		
3	1996	Indiana (1)	1–0	Wisconsin	Jesse Owens Stadium • Columbus, Oh		
4	1997	Michigan (1)	1–0 (a.e.t.)	Northwestern	National Sports Center • Blaine, Mn		
5	1998	Penn State (1)	2–0	Ohio State	Jeffrey Field • University Park, Pa		
6	1999	Michigan (2)	4–2	Penn State	Bill Armstrong Stadium • Bloomington, In		
7	2000	Penn State (2)	1–0 (a.e.t.)	Michigan	Demirjian Park • Champaign, Il		
8	2001	Penn State (3)	2–1 (a.e.t.)	Illinois	Folk Field • West Lafayette, In		
9	2002	Ohio State (1)	2–1	Wisconsin	DeMartin Complex • East Lansing, Mi		
10	2003	Illinois (1)	2–0	Michigan	McClimon Stadium • Madison, Wi		
11	2004	Ohio State (2)	2–0	Penn State	Jesse Owens Stadium • Columbus, Oh		
12	2005	Wisconsin (2)	3–1	Michigan	U-M Soccer Stadium • Ann Arbor, Mi		
13	2006	Penn State (4)	3–1	Illinois	Jeffrey Field • University Park, Pa		
14	2007	Purdue (1)	3–1	Ohio State	Elizabeth Lyle Stadium • Falcon Heights, Mn		
15	2008	Penn State (5)	2–1	Minnesota	Iowa Soccer Complex • Iowa City, Ia		
16	2011	Illinois (2)	2–1	Penn State	Lakeside Field • Evanston, Il		
17	2012	Ohio State (3)	2–1	Illinois	Bill Armstrong Stadium • Bloomington, In		
18	2013	Nebraska (1)	1–0	Iowa	Demirjian Park • Champaign, Il		
19	2014	Wisconsin (2)	1–0 (a.e.t.)	Iowa	Folk Field • West Lafayette, In		
20	2015	Penn State (6)	2–0	Rutgers	Jeffrey Field • University Park, Pa		
21	2016	Minnesota (2)	2–1	Rutgers	Elizabeth Lyle Stadium • Falcon Heights, Mn	Sydney Squires, Minnesota	Tori Burnett, Minnesota
22	2017	Penn State (7)	2–1	Northwestern	Grand Park • Westfield, In		
23	2018	Minnesota (3)	0–0 (5–4 p)	Penn State	Grand Park • Westfield, In	April Bockin, Minnesota	Maddie Nielsen, Minnesota
24	2019	Penn State (8)	2–1 (a.e.t.)	Michigan	Yurcak Field • Piscataway, NJ	Payton Linnehan, Penn State	Amanda Dennis, Penn State
25	2020	Iowa (1)	1–0	Wisconsin	Jeffrey Field • University Park, Pa		
26	2021	Michigan (3)	1–0	Rutgers	Yurcak Field • Piscataway, Nj	Raleigh Loughman, Michigan	Alia Martin, Michigan
27	2022	Penn State (9)	3–2	Michigan State	Lower.com Field • Columbus, Oh	Ally Schlegel, Penn State	Katherine Asman, Penn State
28	2023	Iowa (2)	1–0	Wisconsin	Lower.com Field • Columbus, Oh	Emma Jaskaniec, Wisconsin	Samantha Cary, Iowa
29	2024	UCLA (1)	5–0	Rutgers	Energizer Park • St. Louis, Missouri	Quincy McMahon, UCLA	
30	2025	Washington (1)	1–1 (4–1 p)	Michigan State	Energizer Park • St. Louis, Missouri	Samiah Shell, Washington	
31	2026	Purdue (2)	4–3 (a.e.t.)	Michigan State	Folk Field • West Lafayette, Indiana	Irene Campo, Purdue	

=== By school ===
As of 2026 Tournament

School	GP	W	L	T	Pct.	Finals	Titles	Title Years
Illinois	37	16	15	5	.514	5	2	2003, 2011
Indiana	20	5	14	1	.275	1	1	1996
Iowa	25	11	12	2	.480	4	2	2020, 2023
Maryland	1	0	1	0	.000	0	0	—
Michigan	46	24	18	4	.565	7	3	1997, 1999, 2021
Michigan State	28	8	17	3	.339	3	0	—
Minnesota	36	17	14	5	.542	5	3	1995, 2016, 2018
Nebraska	11	5	4	2	.545	1	1	2013
Northwestern	26	8	17	1	.327	2	0	—
Ohio State	38	14	19	5	.434	5	3	2002, 2004, 2012
Penn State	65	42	17	6	.692	13	9	1998, 2000, 2001, 2006, 2008, 2015, 2017, 2019, 2022
Purdue	23	11	9	3	.543	2	2	2007, 2026
Rutgers	22	9	9	4	.500	4	0	—
UCLA	6	4	2	0	.667	1	1	2024
USC	3	1	1	1	.500	0	0	—
Washington	6	2	2	2	.500	1	1	2025
Wisconsin	49	21	22	5	.490	8	3	1994, 2005, 2014

== Big Ten Medal of Honor ==
The Big Ten Medal of Honor is awarded to a player from the graduating class of a Big Ten Conference university who "demonstrated athletic and academic excellence throughout their college career." The recipients include:

Year	Player	Team
1991	Emily Coatney	Michigan State
1992	Heather Taggart	Wisconsin
1994	Susie Holt	Wisconsin
1998	Jennifer McElmury	Golden Gophers
1999	Shannon Brown	Wisconsin
2001	Kacy Beitel	Michigan
2003	Emily Oleksiuk	Penn State
2005	Joanna Lohman	Penn State
2006	Jessica Ring	Wisconsin
2006	Christen Karniski	Illinois
2006	Courtney O'Bryan	Indiana
2008	Mary Therese McDonnell	Illinois
2006	Lindsey Cottrell	Michigan
2008	Shauna Stapleton	Purdue
2009	Emily Zurrer	Illinois
2009	Zoe Bouchelle	Penn State
2011	Jenna Carosio	Illinois
2012	Laurie Nosbusch	Wisconsin
2014	Vanessa DiBernardo	Illinois
2016	Rachel Beanlands	Maryland
2016	Britt Eckerstrom	Penn State
2016	Brianne Reed	Rutgers
