= Kate Wiesner =

American soccer player (born 2001)

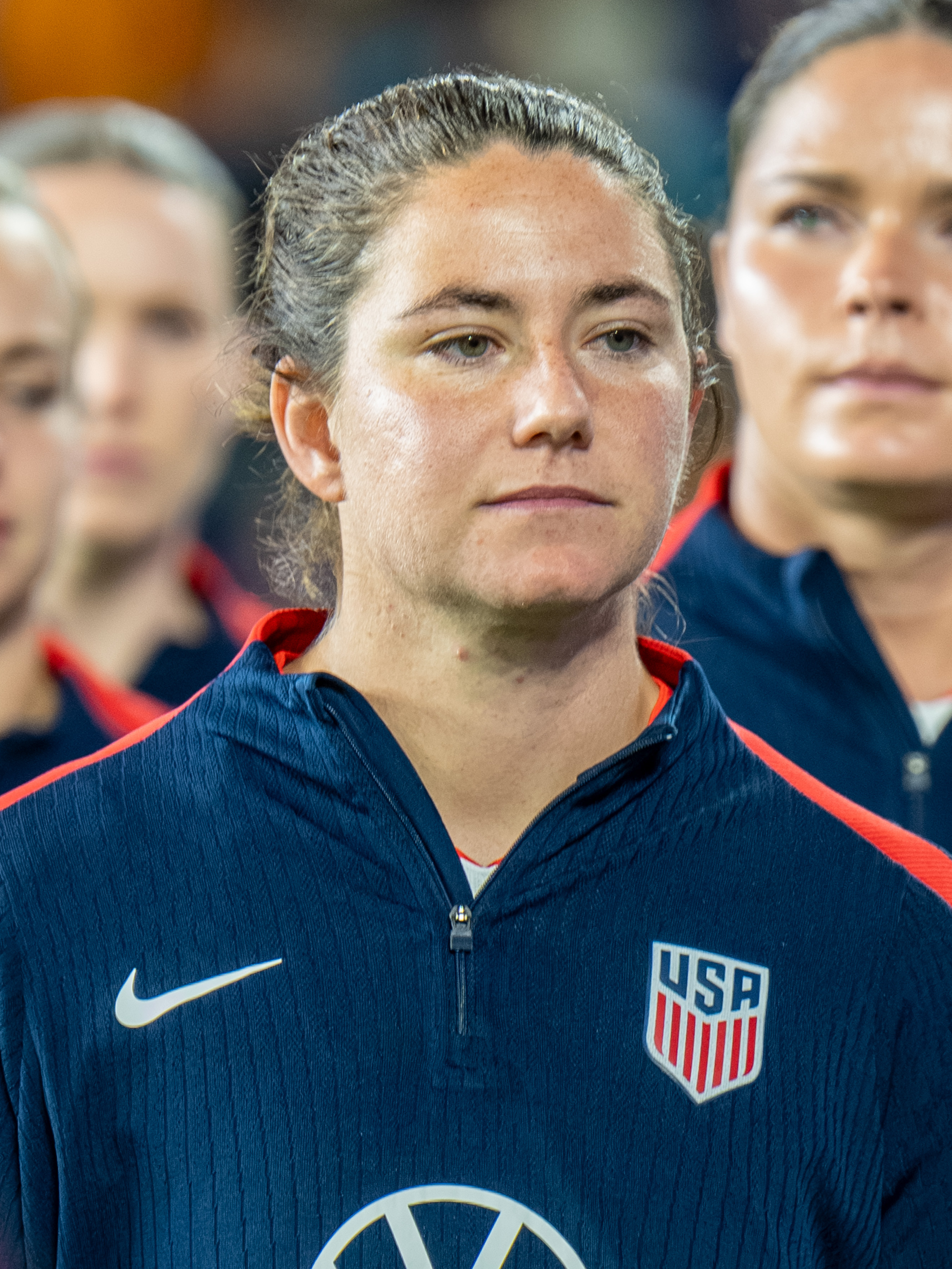
- Wiesner with the United States in 2025

Personal information
- Full name: Kate McGuire Wiesner
- Date of birth: February 11, 2001 (age 25)
- Height: 5 ft 7 in (1.70 m)
- Positions: Left back; winger

Team information
- Current team: Washington Spirit
- Number: 6

College career
Years	Team	Apps	(Gls)
2019–2023	Penn State Nittany Lions	71	(6)

Senior career*
Years	Team	Apps	(Gls)
2024–	Washington Spirit	46	(2)

International career^{‡}
2016–2018	United States U-17	34+	(1+)
2017	United States U-19	3	(0)
2019	United States U-20	1	(0)
2025–	United States	3	(0)
- * Club domestic league appearances and goals as of 05:30, November 15, 2026 (UTC) ‡ National team caps and goals as of January 27, 2026

Kate McGuire Wiesner (born February 11, 2001) is an American professional soccer player who plays as a left back or winger for the Washington Spirit of the National Women's Soccer League (NWSL). She played college soccer for the Penn State Nittany Lions and was selected by the Spirit in the first round of the 2024 NWSL Draft. She represented the United States at the 2016 FIFA U-17 Women's World Cup.

== Early life ==
Wiesner grew up in Monrovia, California, the daughter of Scott and Mary Wiesner. She joined Slammers FC at age 13, going on to win three ECNL national championships with the club. She sustained an anterior cruciate ligament injury in 2018. She was ranked by TopDrawerSoccer as the No. 1 prospect of the 2019 class, part of Penn State's top-ranked recruiting class. She graduated from Monrovia High School.

== College career ==
After becoming a starter for the Penn State and scoring a goal in her college debut against Stanford, Wiesner sustained a second anterior cruciate ligament injury in the eighth game of her freshman season in 2019. Her recovery took two years before she returned to the field in 2021, making 19 appearances and scoring 1 goals in her junior season. Back to starting regularly in 2022, she led the Big Ten Conference with 11 assists and scored 2 goals in 23 games. She scored the game winner against Northwestern in the Big Ten tournament semifinals as the Nittany Lions won the tournament. She was named co-captain for her fifth and final season in 2023, scoring 2 goals and adding 5 assists in 21 games, earning third-team All-Big Ten honors as part of the conference's best scoring defense.

== Club career ==
Wiesner was drafted by the Washington Spirit with the seventh overall pick in the first round of the 2024 NWSL Draft, the team's third pick of the night. She was signed to a three-year contract. She made her professional debut as a starter in the season-opening loss to the Seattle Reign on March 17. On June 8, she scored her first professional goal, striking the ball into the corner through traffic for the lone goal of the game against the Utah Royals. She made 15 regular-season appearances as a rookie, starting 5, as the Spirit finished second in the standings. In the playoff quarterfinals, she played 42 minutes including extra time after replacing Heather Stainbrook in a 2–1 win over Bay FC. She was unused for the rest of the playoffs as Washington reached the 2024 NWSL Championship, losing to the Orlando Pride.

After missing several months with a hip injury, Wiesner made her first appearance of the season in a 0–0 draw with the San Diego Wave on June 22, 2025. She scored her only goal of the season on August 23, lifting a cross that found its way into the net, in a 3–2 win over Bay FC before an NWSL record crowd at Oracle Park. She played in 13 league games, starting 10, as the Spirit again placed second in the table. In the playoffs, she played almost 90 minutes including extra time after replacing an injured Gabrielle Carle in the quarterfinals against Racing Louisville. Washington advanced on penalties after a 1–1 draw. With Carle still injured, Wiesner played the entire 2–0 semifinal win against the Portland Thorns.

== International career ==
Wiesner was called into training with the United States under-15 team in 2015, becoming team captain of that age level. Shen joined the under-17 team, initially playing up two age groups, and was part of the squads at the 2016 CONCACAF Women's U-17 Championship, the 2016 FIFA U-17 Women's World Cup, and the 2018 CONCACAF Women's U-17 Championship. She missed the 2018 FIFA U-17 Women's World Cup due to injury. She also played friendly tournaments at the under-19 and under-23 levels.

Wiesner was called up as a training player for head coach Emma Hayes's first senior national team camp in June 2024. In November 2025, she earned her second call-up before a pair of friendlies against Italy. On November 28, 2025, Wiesner made her international debut in a 3–0 victory over Italy.

== Career statistics ==
=== International ===
As of match played January 27, 2026

National Team	Year	Apps	Goals
United States	2025	2	0
United States	2026	1	0
Total		3	0

== Honors and awards ==
Penn State Nittany Lions

- Big Ten women's soccer tournament: 2019, 2022

Washington Spirit

- NWSL Challenge Cup: 2025

United States U-17

- CONCACAF Women's U-17 Championship: 2016, 2018

Individual

- Third-team All-Big Ten: 2023
- Big Ten tournament all-tournament: 2023
