= 2020 Big Ten women's soccer tournament =

- Classification: Division I
- Teams: 14
- Matches: 13 (total); 3 (main tournament)
- Attendance: 1,417
- Site: Various (Campus sites)
- Champions: Iowa (1st title)
- Winning coach: Dave DiIanni (1st title)
- Broadcast: BTN; BTN+

2020 Big Ten Conference women's soccer standings
	Conf.						Overall
Team	W		L		T	PCT	W		L		T	PCT
No. 4 Penn St ‍†‍‍	9	–	1	–	1	.864	12	–	3	–	1	.781
Ohio St ‍‍‍	6	–	1	–	3	.750	7	–	2	–	3	.708
No. 22 Rutgers ‍‍‍	6	–	2	–	3	.682	8	–	3	–	3	.679
Wisconsin ‍‍‍	6	–	3	–	2	.636	7	–	4	–	3	.607
Indiana ‍‍‍	6	–	4	–	1	.591	6	–	5	–	1	.542
Illinois ‍‍‍	6	–	4	–	1	.591	6	–	5	–	1	.542
Michigan ‍‍‍	5	–	3	–	3	.591	5	–	3	–	3	.591
Minnesota ‍‍‍	5	–	3	–	3	.591	5	–	4	–	3	.542
Northwestern ‍‍‍	5	–	6	–	0	.455	6	–	6	–	1	.500
Purdue ‍‍‍	4	–	5	–	2	.455	4	–	6	–	2	.417
Nebraska ‍‍‍	2	–	5	–	3	.350	2	–	5	–	3	.350
Iowa ‍‍‡‍^{y}	2	–	8	–	1	.227	6	–	8	–	1	.433
Michigan St ‍‍‍	1	–	9	–	1	.136	1	–	10	–	1	.125
Maryland ‍‍‍	0	–	9	–	2	.091	0	–	10	–	2	.083
† – Conference champion ‡ – 2020 Big Ten Tournament champion y – Invited to the NCAA tournament As of April 18, 2021; Rankings from United Soccer Coaches Poll; Source:2020 Women's Soccer Standings

The 2020 Big Ten women's soccer tournament was the postseason women's soccer tournament for the Big Ten Conference for the 2020 season. It was held from April 8 to April 18. As the tournament winner, Iowa earned the conference's automatic bid to the 2020 NCAA Division I Women's Soccer Tournament.

== Effects of the COVID-19 pandemic ==
The Big Ten tournament was originally set to be played in November 2020. However, the Big Ten postponed fall sports with the hope of playing them in the spring.

== Format ==
The tournament consist of all 14 teams in the conference, instead of 8 as in previous years.

Rather than a straightforward 14-team tournament, there will be four "mini-tournaments" based on region and seeding. Two of the regionals will have four teams, and the other two, consisting of the two division winners, will have three. The four regional winners will advance to the main tournament, consisting of a semi-final round and the final, with each game hosted by the higher seed.

== Regionals ==
=== East regional 1 ===
Semifinals
1	Ohio State	4
4	Maryland	2
3	Rutgers	1
2	Michigan State	0

Finals
Ohio State	0
Rutgers	1

==== Semifinals ====
April 8	Ohio State	4–2	Maryland	Columbus, Ohio
12:00 p.m. ET	Kayla Fischer 42'; Peyton McNamara 56', 80'; Alyssa Baumbick 62'	Report	Mikayla Dayes 9'; Alyssa Poarch 82'	Stadium: Jesse Owens Memorial Stadium; Attendance: 80

April 8	Michigan State	0–1 (a.e.t.)	Rutgers	Columbus, Ohio
3:00 p.m. ET		Report	Amirah Ali 106'	Stadium: Jesse Owens Memorial Stadium; Attendance: 44

==== Final ====
April 11	Ohio State	0–1	Rutgers	Columbus, Ohio
12:00 p.m. ET		Report	Ohio State own goal 80' (o.g.)	Stadium: Jesse Owens Memorial Stadium; Attendance: 120

=== East regional 2 ===
Semifinal			Final
			1	Penn State	3
2	Indiana	-		Indiana	1
3	Michigan	-

==== Semifinals ====
April 9	Indiana	Cancelled	Michigan	University Park, Pennsylvania
4:00 p.m. ET		Report		Stadium: Jeffrey Field

==== Final ====
April 11	Penn State	3–1	Indiana	University Park, Pennsylvania
	Ally Schlegel 12', 60'; Frankie Tagliaferri 45'	Report	Anna Bennett 73'	Stadium: Jeffrey Field; Attendance: 258

=== West regional 1 ===
Semifinals
1	Illinois	1
4	Iowa	2
3	Minnesota	-
2	Nebraska	-

Finals
Iowa	2
Minnesota	0

==== Semifinals ====
April 8	Illinois	1–2 (a.e.t.)	Iowa	Champaign, Illinois
8:00 p.m. ET	Kennedy Berschel 53'	Report	Josie Durr 48'; Meike Ingles 93'	Stadium: Demirjian Park; Attendance: 100

April 8	Nebraska	Cancelled	Minnesota	Champaign, Illinois
		Report		Stadium: Demirjian Park

==== Final ====
April 11	Minnesota	0–2	Iowa	Champaign, Illinois
		Report	Meike Ingles 2'; Samantha Tawharu 8'	Stadium: Demirjian Park; Attendance: 11

=== West regional 2 ===
Semifinal			Final
			1	Wisconsin	1 (4)
2	Northwestern	1		Northwestern	1 (2)
3	Purdue	0

==== Semifinals ====
April 8	Northwestern	1–0	Purdue	Madison, Wisconsin
6:00 p.m. ET	Regan Steigleder 67' (pen.)	Report		Stadium: Dan McClimon Memorial Track/Soccer Complex; Attendance: 50

==== Final ====
April 11	Wisconsin	1–1 (a.e.t.) (4–2 p)	Northwestern	Madison, Wisconsin
	Cameron Murtha 58'	Report	Lily Gilbertson 37'	Stadium: Dan McClimon Memorial Track/Soccer Complex; Attendance: 75
	Penalties
	Emma Jaskaniec (penalty scored); Lauren Rice (penalty scored); Sammy Kleedtke (penalty scored); Clare Odmark (penalty scored)		(penalty scored) Regan Steigleder; (penalty missed) Aurea Martin; (penalty scored) Rowan Lapi; (penalty missed) Chloe McGhee

== Final tournament ==
Semifinals
1	Penn State	0
4	Iowa	1
3	Rutgers	1
2	Wisconsin	2

Finals
Iowa	1
Wisconsin	0

=== Semifinals ===
April 15
5:00 p.m. ET

Penn State	0–1	Iowa
	Report	Meike Ingles 48'

Jeffrey Field, University Park
Attendance: 1
April 15
7:30 p.m. ET

Wisconsin	2–1	Rutgers
Lauren Rice 62'; Emma Jaskaniec 86'	Report	Nneka Moneme 24'

Jeffrey Field, University Park
Attendance: 406

=== Final ===
April 18
12:00 p.m. ET

Wisconsin	0–1	Iowa
		Jenny Cape 64'

Jeffrey Field, University Park
Attendance: 272
