= Sarah Webber =

Sarah Webber is the name of:

- Sarah Webber (General Hospital)
- Sarah Webber, character in 31 North 62 East

== See also ==
- Sarah Weber (born 2003), American soccer player
