= Sarah Weber =

American soccer player (born 2003)

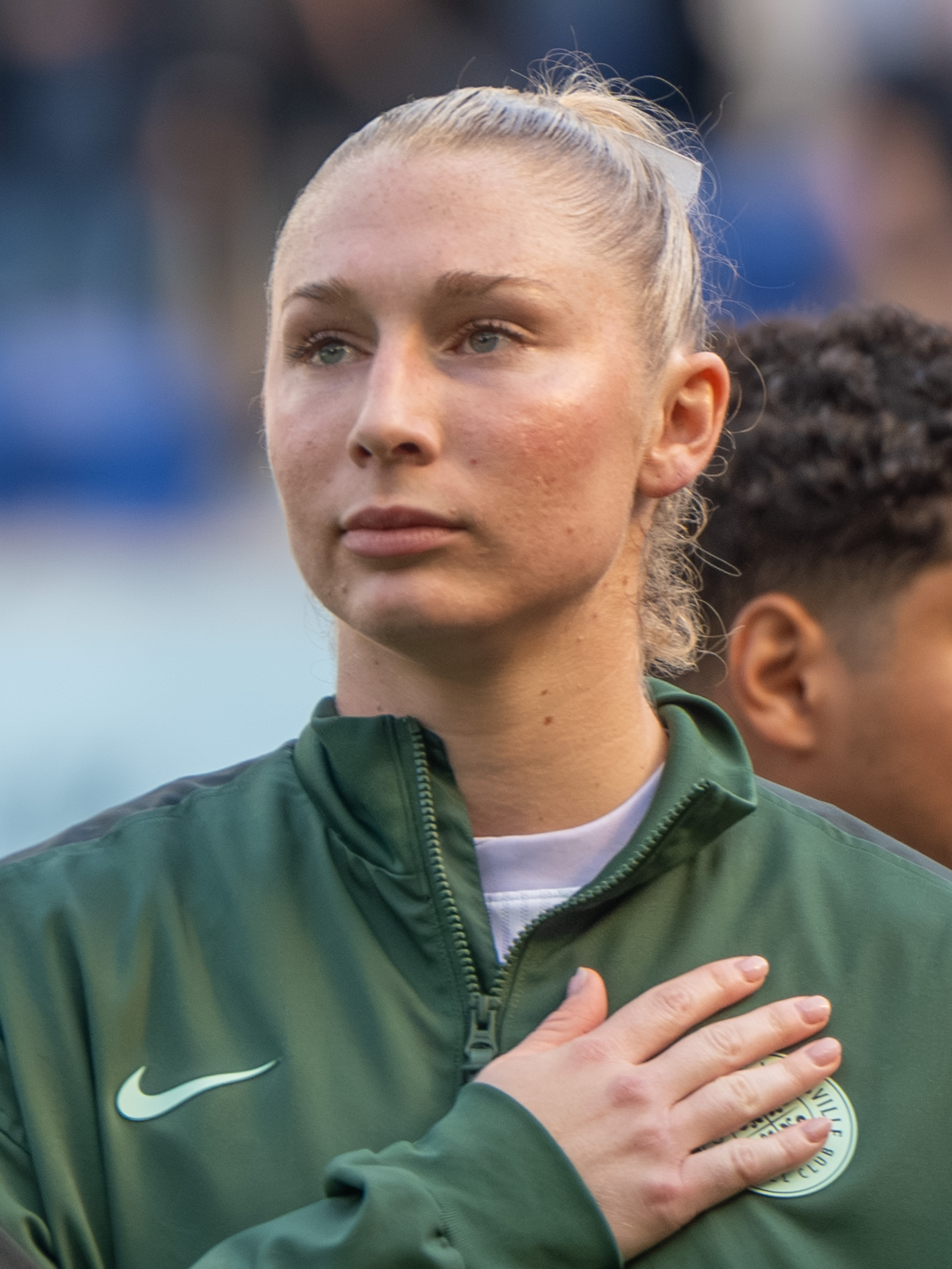
- Weber with Racing Louisville in 2025

Personal information
- Full name: Sarah Marie Weber
- Date of birth: February 14, 2003 (age 23)
- Height: 5 ft 6 in (1.68 m)
- Positions: Striker; midfielder

Team information
- Current team: Racing Louisville
- Number: 42

College career
Years	Team	Apps	(Gls)
2021–2024	Nebraska Cornhuskers	78	(43)

Senior career*
Years	Team	Apps	(Gls)
2025–	Racing Louisville	51	(6)

International career^{‡}
2025–	United States U23	3	(2)
- * Club domestic league appearances and goals as of 06:03, November 2, 2026 (UTC) ‡ National team caps and goals as of 14:22, March 8, 2026 (UTC)

Sarah Marie Weber (born February 14, 2003) is an American professional soccer player who plays as a striker for Racing Louisville FC of the National Women's Soccer League (NWSL). She played college soccer for the Nebraska Cornhuskers, earning first-team All-Big Ten honors three times.

== Early life ==
Weber grew up in Gretna, Nebraska, one of four children born to Kevin and Tammy Weber. She attended Gretna High School, where she scored 100 goals with 49 assists in three seasons. She was named all-state, All-American, and the Nebraska Gatorade Player of the Year two times. In her senior season, she had 48 goals and 29 assists as she led Gretna to the Class A state championship. She played club soccer for Gretna Sports Club and Sporting Nebraska FC.

== College career ==
Weber started all but one game for the Nebraska Cornhuskers from 2021 to 2024. In her freshman season, she scored 6 goals with 2 assists in 18 games and was named to the Big Ten Conference all-freshman team. She led the team with 10 goals and added 5 assists in 20 games in her sophomore season, including one goal and one assist in the Big Ten tournament as Nebraska made the semifinals.

In her junior season, she scored 16 goals with 6 assists in 23 games, helping Nebraska win a share of the Big Ten regular-season title and match their best-ever NCAA tournament performance. After scoring twice in two games of the Big Ten tournament, she scored four times in four games of the NCAA tournament, including in their 2–1 quarterfinal loss to eventual finalists Stanford. Weber scored 11 goals including two hat tricks with 3 assists in 17 games in her senior season. She was named first-team All-Big Ten each of her last three seasons and third-team All-American by TopDrawerSoccer after her junior season.

== Club career ==
=== Racing Louisville ===
Racing Louisville FC announced on January 17, 2025, that they had signed Weber to her first professional contract, a two-year deal. She made her professional debut on March 15, coming on as a second-half substitute for Kayla Fischer in the season opener, a 1–1 draw against the North Carolina Courage. She scored her first professional goal on June 6, netting a game-winning header in the 85th minute of a match versus the Utah Royals.

== International career ==
Weber was called up to the United States under-23 team for friendlies against NWSL teams in the 2023 preseason.

== Honors and awards ==
Individual

- First-team All-Big Ten: 2022, 2023, 2024
- Third-team TopDrawerSoccer All-American: 2023
- Big Ten all-freshman team: 2021
- Big Ten tournament all-tournament team: 2023
