= 2022 Big Ten women's soccer tournament =

Postseason women's soccer tournament

- Classification: Division I
- Teams: 8
- Matches: 7
- Attendance: 7,138
- Quarterfinals site: Higher seeds Campus Sites
- Semifinals site: Lower.com Field; Columbus, Ohio
- Finals site: Lower.com Field; Columbus, Ohio
- Champions: Penn State (9th title)
- Winning coach: Erica Dambach (9th title)
- MVP: Ally Schlegel (offensive); Katherine Asman (defensive) (Penn State)
- Broadcast: BTN

2022 Big Ten Conference women's soccer standings
	Conf.						Overall
Team	W		L		T	PCT	W		L		T	PCT
No. 15 Michigan State ‍†‍‍^{y}	9	–	0	–	1	.950	17	–	3	–	3	.804
No. 11 Northwestern ‍‍‍^{y}	7	–	2	–	1	.750	16	–	5	–	2	.739
Wisconsin ‍‍‍	6	–	3	–	1	.650	11	–	5	–	3	.658
Nebraska ‍‍‍	5	–	3	–	2	.600	8	–	7	–	5	.525
Ohio State ‍‍‍^{y}	5	–	3	–	2	.600	11	–	6	–	3	.625
No. 13 Penn St ‍‍‡‍^{y}	5	–	3	–	2	.600	15	–	5	–	3	.717
Rutgers ‍‍‍^{y}	5	–	3	–	2	.600	13	–	5	–	2	.700
Minnesota ‍‍‍	4	–	4	–	2	.500	8	–	8	–	3	.500
Iowa ‍‍‍	2	–	3	–	5	.450	5	–	6	–	7	.472
Illinois ‍‍‍	2	–	5	–	3	.350	7	–	7	–	4	.500
Maryland ‍‍‍	3	–	7	–	0	.300	4	–	8	–	5	.382
Michigan ‍‍‍	2	–	6	–	2	.300	7	–	8	–	3	.472
Indiana ‍‍‍	1	–	7	–	2	.200	3	–	7	–	7	.382
Purdue ‍‍‍	0	–	7	–	3	.150	3	–	11	–	3	.265
† – Conference champion ‡ – 2022 Big Ten Tournament champion y – Invited to the NCAA tournament As of December 6, 2022; Rankings from United Soccer Coaches Poll; Source:Big Ten

The 2022 Big Ten women's soccer tournament was the postseason women's soccer tournament for the Big Ten Conference for the 2022 season. It was held from October 30 to November 6, 2022. As the tournament champion, Penn State, earned the Big Ten Conference's automatic berth into the 2022 NCAA Division I women's soccer tournament.

== Seeding ==
Eight Big Ten schools will participate in the tournament. Teams are seeded by conference record.

Seed	School	Conference	Tiebreaker
1	Michigan State	9–0–1	
2	Northwestern	7–2–1	
3	Wisconsin	6–3–1	
4	Nebraska	5–3–2	
5	Ohio State	5–3–2	
6	Penn State	5–3–2	
7	Rutgers	5–3–2	
8	Minnesota	4–4–2	

== Bracket ==
Quarterfinals; October 30
1	Michigan State	2
8	Minnesota	1
4	Nebraska	4
5	Ohio State	0
3	Wisconsin	0
6	Penn State	1
2	Northwestern	2
7	Rutgers	1

Semifinals; November 3
1	Michigan State	2
4	Nebraska	1
6	Penn State	2
2	Northwestern	0

Championship; November 6
1	Michigan State	2
6	Penn State	3

== Schedule ==
=== Quarterfinals ===
October 30	#2 Northwestern	2–1	#7 Rutgers	Evanston, IL
1:00 p.m. ET	Rowan Lapi 22'; Nicole Doucette 53'	Report	8', (yellow card) 73' Riley Tiernan	Stadium: Martin Stadium; Attendance: 782; Referee: Chico Grajeda; Assistant referees: Adrian Werbicki; Vitali Hantsevich; Fourth official: Michael Kennedy

October 30	#4 Nebraska	4–0	#5 Ohio State	Lincoln, NE
1:00 p.m. ET	Eleanor Dale 9', 57'; Abbey Schwarz 19', (yellow card) 61'; Sarah Weber 63'; Sadie Waite (yellow card) 82'; Maggie Altman (yellow card) 86'	Report		Stadium: Hibner Field; Attendance: 1,519; Referee: Alex Beehler; Assistant referees: Brent Wilson; Matt Seem; Fourth official: Bobby Simetich

October 30	#1 Michigan State	2–1	#8 Minnesota	East Lansing, MI
4:00 p.m. ET	Jordyn Wickes 55', 67'; Camryn Evans (yellow card) 56'; Allie Mairn (yellow card) 87'	Report	5' McKenna Buisman	Stadium: DeMartin Soccer Complex; Attendance: 2,838; Referee: Scarlet Agrawal; Assistant referees: Andrew Bigelow; Sean West; Fourth official: Nicole Green

October 30	#3 Wisconsin	0–1	#6 Penn State	Madison, WI
5:00 p.m. ET	Ashley Martinez (yellow card) 29'	Report	75' Ally Schlegel	Stadium: McClimon Field; Attendance: 647; Referee: Christopher Koloffon; Assistant referees: Jas Zahirovic; Brian McKay; Fourth official: Maxwell Unger

=== Semifinals ===
November 3	#1 Michigan State	2–1	#4 Nebraska	Columbus, OH
2:00 p.m. ET	Camryn Evans 22'; Courtney Koehler 66'	Report	36' Eleanor Dale	Stadium: Lower.com Field; Referee: Sergio Gonzalez; Assistant referees: Max Campbell; Michael Gorsegner; Fourth official: Kevin Fikar

November 3	#2 Northwestern	0–2	#6 Penn State	Columbus, OH
4:30 p.m. ET		Report	3' Kate Wiesner; 19' Payton Linnehan; (yellow card) 62' Penelope Hocking; (yellow card) 84' Mieke Schiemann	Stadium: Lower.com Field; Attendance: 327; Referee: Nicole Green; Assistant referees: Maggie Short; Courtney Hayworth; Fourth official: Laura Snyder

=== Final ===
November 3	#1 Michigan State	2–3	#6 Penn State	Columbus, OH
2:00 p.m. ET	Penn State Own Goal 5' (o.g.); Lauren DeBeau 75'	Report	38' Kaitlyn MacBean; 54', 82' Ally Schlegel	Stadium: Lower.com Field; Attendance: 1,025; Referee: Donovan Noocha; Assistant referees: Adam Herges; Quinton McFarlen; Fourth official: Audra Fullen

== Statistics ==
=== Goalscorers ===
There were 21 goals scored in 7 matches, for an average of 3 goals per match (as of November 6, 2022).

3 goals

- Eleanor Dale – Nebraska
- Ally Schlegel – Penn State

2 goals

- Jordyn Wickes – Michigan State

1 goal

- Abbey Schwarz – Nebraska
- Sarah Weber – Nebraska
- Nicole Doucette – Northwestern
- Rowan Lapi – Northwestern
- Lauren DeBeau – Michigan State
- Camryn Evans – Michigan State
- Courtney Koehler – Michigan State
- McKenna Buisman – Minnesota
- Payton Linnehan – Penn State
- Kaitlyn MacBean – Penn State
- Kate Wiesner – Penn State
- Riley Tiernan – Rutgers

1 own goal

- Penn State (vs. Michigan State)

== All-Tournament team ==
Player	Team
Lauren DeBeau	Michigan State
Justina Gaynor	Michigan State
Gabbie Cesarone	Minnesota
Eleanor Dale	Nebraska
Rowan Lapi	Northwestern
Sydney Jones	Ohio State
Katherine Asman^	Penn State
Cori Dyke	Penn State
Ally Schlegel*	Penn State
Becci Fluchel	Rutgers
Aidan McConnell	Wisconsin

* Offensive MVP
^ Defensive MVP
