= 2024 NWSL Draft =

Soccer draft

General information
- Sport: Soccer
- Date: January 12, 2024
- Time: 8:00 pm (EST)
- Location: Anaheim Convention Center, Anaheim, California
- Network: ION
- Sponsored by: Ally

Overview
- 56 total selections in 4 rounds
- League: National Women's Soccer League
- Teams: 14
- First selection: Ally Sentnor, Utah Royals
- Most selections: Utah Royals and Washington Spirit (6)
- Fewest selections: NJ/NY Gotham FC (1)

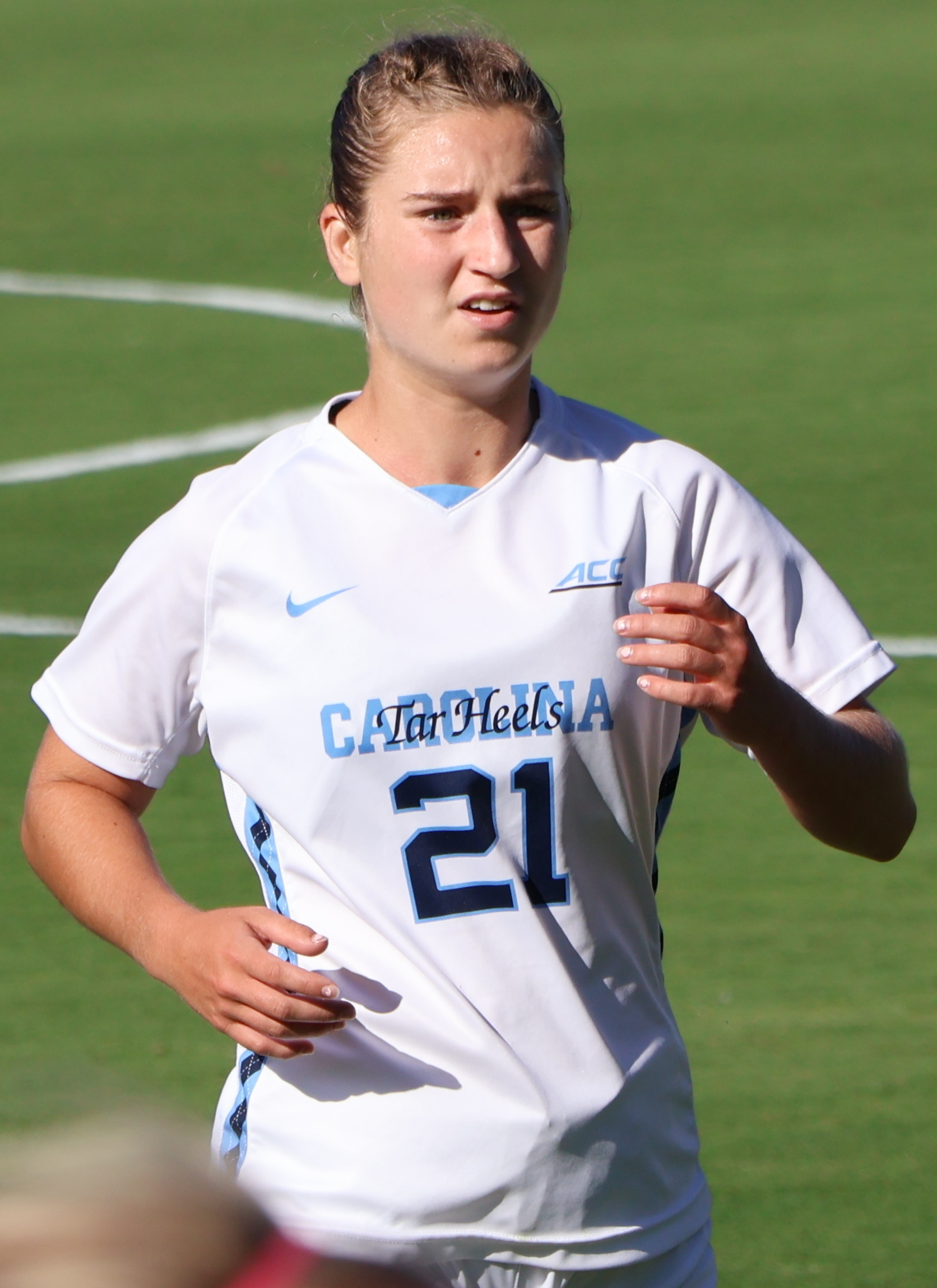
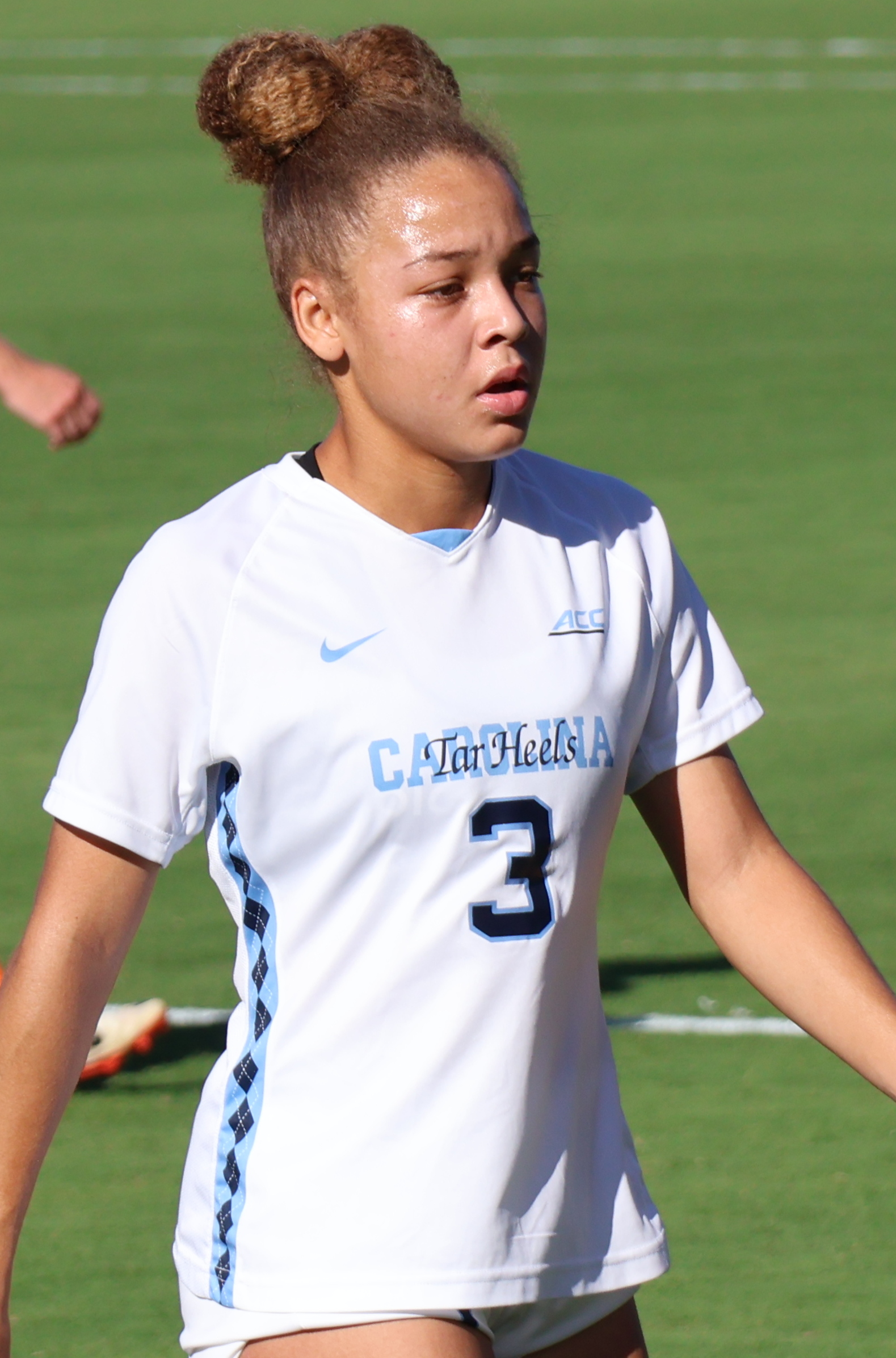
Ally Sentnor and Savy King, teammates at North Carolina, were selected first and second overall.

The 2024 NWSL Draft presented by Ally was the twelfth annual meeting of National Women's Soccer League (NWSL) franchises to select from a list of amateur players above the age of 18 playing in the United States who exhausted, lost, or renounced any remaining collegiate eligibility. It was held on January 12, 2024, at the 2024 United Soccer Coaches Convention in Anaheim, California, and broadcast by ION.

Expansion sides Utah Royals and Bay FC held the first and second overall picks respectively. Ally Sentnor was selected by Utah Royals with the first overall pick. It was the first time Utah Royals had selected first and the third time a player out of North Carolina was selected first.

It was the final NWSL college draft to be held prior to the draft's abolition as part of the new Collective Bargaining Agreement signed in August 2024, making the NWSL the first major professional sports league in the United States to eliminate the draft system. Beginning with the 2025 rookie class, first-year players could sign with teams as free agents.

== Format ==
- All 14 teams of the National Women's Soccer League (NWSL) took turns making their selections over four rounds, with 14 picks per round. Draft order in each round was determined by the reverse order of the final 2023 regular season standings, with the exceptions being Utah Royals and Bay FC taking the first two selections as expansion teams and the two teams that contested the 2023 Championship game, Seattle Reign FC (formerly OL Reign) and NJ/NY Gotham FC, taking the last two selections.
- The final list of players eligible for selection was released on January 9, 2024. 230 players representing 138 schools declared for the draft.
- Gaining the first choice in the asset selection process through a random generator, Utah Royals selected priority in the NWSL Draft. As a result, Utah received pick No. 1 in both the first and third rounds of the draft, while Bay will select first in rounds two and four. By virtue, Bay were given the first pick in the 2024 NWSL Expansion Draft.
- Ion Television covered the draft domestically. International broadcast was available on the NWSL website.

== Results ==
As of October 4, 2026

=== Key ===
^{+}	Denotes player who has been selected as NWSL Most Valuable Player
^{*}	Denotes player who has been selected for an NWSL Best XI or NWSL Second XI team
^{^}	Denotes player who has been selected as NWSL Rookie of the Year
^{#}	Denotes player who has never appeared in a competitive NWSL game (regular season, playoff, or Challenge Cup)

=== Picks ===
Round	Pick	Nat.	Player	Pos.	NWSL team	Notes	College
Round 1	1	(United States)	Ally Sentnor	M	Utah Royals		North Carolina
Round 1	2	(United States)	Savy King	D	Bay FC		North Carolina
Round 1	3	(United States)	Croix Bethune *^	M	Washington Spirit	(Note: Chicago Red Stars → Washington Spirit. Washington Spirit acquired the No. 3 overall pick in the 2024 NWSL Draft in exchange Chicago Red Stars acquired Sam Staab.)	Georgia
Round 1	4	(United States)	Brecken Mozingo	F	Utah Royals	(Note: Kansas City Current → Utah Royals. Utah Royals acquired the No. 4 overall pick in the 2024 NWSL Draft and Kate Del Fava in exchange Kansas City Current acquired protection in the 2024 NWSL Expansion Draft.)	BYU
Round 1	5	(United States)	Hal Hershfelt *	M	Washington Spirit	(Note: Houston Dash → North Carolina Courage → Washington Spirit.Washington Spirit acquired the No.5 pick in the 2024 NWSL Draft and $250,000 in allocation money in exchange for Ashley Sanchez. North Carolina Courage previously acquired the No. 8 pick in the 2023 NWSL Draft, the natural first-round pick in the 2024 NWSL Draft, a 2023 international spot, and $100,000 in allocation money from Houston Dash in exchange for Diana Ordoñez and the No. 30 pick in the 2023 NWSL Draft.)	Clemson
Round 1	6	(United States)	Reilyn Turner	F	Racing Louisville FC		UCLA
Round 1	7	(United States)	Kate Wiesner	D	Washington Spirit		Penn State
Round 1	8	(United States)	Maya Doms	M	Bay FC	(Note: Orlando Pride → Bay FC. Bay FC acquired Orlando Pride natural first round pick (No. 8) in the 2024 NWSL Draft in exchange for $50,000 in allocation money and protection in the 2024 NWSL Expansion Draft from Bay FC)	Stanford
Round 1	9	(United States)	Ally Lemos	M	Orlando Pride	(Note: Angel City FC → Orlando Pride. Orlando Pride acquired the natural first round pick in the 2024 draft, $75,000 in allocation money, and additional allocation money pending conditions met from Angel City FC in exchange for Sydney Leroux.)	UCLA
Round 1	10	(Bermuda)	Leilanni Nesbeth	M	Chicago Red Stars	(Note: North Carolina Courage → Chicago Red Stars. Chicago Red Stars acquired the No. 10 overall pick in the 2024 NWSL Draft in exchange North Carolina Courage acquired $175,000 in allocation money.)	Florida State
Round 1	11	(United States)	Payton Linnehan	F	Portland Thorns FC		Penn State
Round 1	12	(United States)	Kennedy Wesley	D	San Diego Wave FC		Stanford
Round 1	13	(United States)	Makenna Morris	D	Washington Spirit	(Note: Seattle Reign FC → Washington Spirit. Washington Spirit acquired the natural first round pick in the 2024 NWSL Draft and the No. 32 pick in the 2023 NWSL Draft from Seattle Reign FC in exchange for Emily Sonnett)	Clemson
Round 1	14	(United States)	Maycee Bell	D	NJ/NY Gotham FC		North Carolina
Round 2	15	(United States)	Jameese Joseph	F	Chicago Red Stars	(Note: Bay FC → Racing Louisville FC → Chicago Red Stars.Chicago Red Stars acquired the No. 15 pick and $125,000 in allocation money from Racing Louisville FC in exchange for Arin Wright. Racing Louisville FC previously acquired the natural second round pick for the 2024 NWSL Draft and 2024 NWSL Expansion Draft protection from Bay FC in exchange for its 2024 NWSL Draft natural third round pick and $235,000 in Alternate Allocation Money)	NC State
Round 2	16	(United States)	Lauren Flynn	D	Utah Royals		Florida State
Round 2	17	(United States)	Sam Meza	M	Seattle Reign FC	(Note: Chicago Red Stars → Seattle Reign FC. Seattle Reign FC acquired the No. 17 overall pick in the 2024 NWSL Draft in exchange Chicago Red Stars acquired $125,000 in allocation money.)	North Carolina
Round 2	18	(United States)	Ellie Wheeler	D	Kansas City Current		Penn State
Round 2	19	(United States)	Avery Patterson *	F	Houston Dash		North Carolina
Round 2	20	(United States)	Olivia Smith-Griffitts	D	Utah Royals	(Note: Racing Louisville FC → Washington Spirit → Utah Royals. Utah Royals acquired the natural second-round picks from Washington Spirit in exchange for 2024 expansion draft protection. Washington Spirit had previously acquired the natural second-round pick and a conditional third-round pick if she reaches 10 appearances in 2024, from Racing Louisville FC in exchange for Jordan Baggett.)	BYU
Round 2	21	(Jamaica)	Kiki Van Zanten	F	Houston Dash	(Note: Washington Spirit → Utah Royals → Houston Dash. Houston Dash acquired the No. 21 overall pick in the 2024 NWSL Draft from Utah Royals in exchange for $120,000 in allocation money. Utah Royals previously acquired the natural second-round picks from Washington Spirit in exchange for 2024 expansion draft protection.)	Notre Dame
Round 2	22	(United States)	Cori Dyke	M	Orlando Pride		Penn State
Round 2	23	(United States)	Olivia Wade-Katoa	M	Portland Thorns FC	(Note: Portland Thorns FC → Angel City FC. Portland Thorns FC acquired the natural second-round pick in the 2024 NWSL Draft the No. 5 pick in the 2023 NWSL Draft, and $200,000 in allocation money from Angel City FC in exchange for Yazmeen Ryan.)	BYU
Round 2	24	(United States)	Talia Staude	D	North Carolina Courage		Virginia
Round 2	25	(United States)	Kelsey Kaufusi ^{#}	D	Portland Thorns FC		Utah State
Round 2	26	(United States)	Emma Jaskaniec ^{#}	M	Utah Royals	(Note: San Diego Wave FC → Orlando Pride → Utah Royals.Utah Royals acquired the No. 26 overall pick in the 2024 NWSL Draft and Mikayla Cluff in exchange for giving Orlando Pride protection in the 2024 NWSL Expansion Draft and $90,000 in allocation money. Orlando Pride had previously acquired the natural second-round pick in the 2024 NWSL Draft and at least $125,000 in allocation money from San Diego Wave FC in exchange for Taylor Kornieck and the rights of Emily Van Egmond.)	Wisconsin
Round 2	27	(United States)	Maddie Mercado	F	Seattle Reign FC		Notre Dame
Round 2	28	(United States)	Emma Sears *	F	Racing Louisville FC	(Note: NJ/NY Gotham FC → Racing Louisville FC. Racing Louisville FC acquired the No. 28 and No. 42 overall picks in 2024 NWSL Draft from NJ/NY Gotham FC in exchange Racing Louisville FC sent $130,000 in allocation money to Bay FC and NJ/NY Gotham FC received protection in the 2024 NWSL Expansion Draft.)	Ohio State
Round 3	29	(Canada)	Zoe Burns	D	Utah Royals		USC
Round 3	30	(United States)	Jamie Shepherd	M	Bay FC		BYU
Round 3	31	(United States)	Hannah Anderson	D	Chicago Red Stars		Texas Tech
Round 3	32	(United States)	Halle Mackiewicz	G	Kansas City Current		Clemson
Round 3	33	(Puerto Rico)	Cristina Roque	G	Utah Royals	(Note: Houston Dash → Portland Thorns FC → Utah Royals. Utah Royals acquired the No. 33 pick in the 2024 NWSL Draft and Hannah Betfort from Portland Thorns in exchange for protection in the 2024 NWSL Expansion Draft. Portland Thorns FC had previously acquired the natural third-round pick in the 2024 NWSL Draft and $10,000 in allocation money from Houston Dash in exchange for the No. 48 pick in the 2024 NWSL Draft.)	Florida State
Round 3	34	(United States)	Caroline Conti	M	Bay FC	(Note: Racing Louisville FC → Bay FC. Bay FC acquired the natural third round pick of Racing Louisville in the 2024 NWSL Draft and $235,000 in Alternate Allocation Money for its natural second round pick in the 2024 NWSL Draft and protection in the 2024 NWSL Expansion Draft)	Clemson
Round 3	35	(United States)	Anna Podojil ^{#}	F	Washington Spirit		Arkansas
Round 3	36	(Canada)	Amanda West	F	Houston Dash	(Note: Orlando Pride → Houston Dash. Houston Dash acquired the natural third-round pick in the 2024 NWSL Draft from Orlando Pride and the rights to Courtney Petersen in exchange for $65,000 in allocation money.)	Pittsburgh
Round 3	37	(United States)	Felicia Knox ^{#}	M	Angel City FC		Alabama
Round 3	38	(United States)	Heather Hinz	G	Houston Dash	(Note: North Carolina Courage → Houston Dash. Houston Dash acquired the No.38 pick in the 2024 NWSL Draft, from North Carolina Courage in exchange for the No. 40 pick in the 2024 NWSL Draft and $10,000 in allocation money.)	South Carolina
Round 3	39	(United States)	Kat Asman	G	Portland Thorns FC		Penn State
Round 3	40	(United States)	Julia Dorsey ^{#}	D	North Carolina Courage	(Note: San Diego Wave FC → Houston Dash → North Carolina Courage. North Carolina Courage acquired the No. 40 pick and $10,000 in allocation money in exchange for the No. 38 pick. Houston Dash previously acquired a natural third round pick in the 2024 NWSL Draft for $60,000 in allocation money and Belle Briede in exchange San Diego Wave FC acquired Sierra Enge.)	North Carolina
Round 3	41	(United States)	Bea Franklin	M	Chicago Red Stars	(Note: Seattle Reign FC → Chicago Red Stars. Chicago Red Stars acquired the natural third-round pick in the 2024 NWSL Draft, a 2023 international roster spot, and the No. 23 pick in the 2023 NWSL Draft from Seattle Reign FC in exchange for the No. 19 pick in the 2023 NWSL Draft.)	Arkansas
Round 3	42	(Canada)	Mya Jones	F	San Diego Wave FC	(Note: NJ/NY Gotham FC → Racing Louisville FC → San Diego Wave FC. San Diego Wave FC acquired the No.42 pick in the 2024 NWSL Draft in exchange for $40,000 in allocation money and the No.54 overall pick. Racing Louisville FC had previously acquired the No. 28 and No. 42 overall picks in 2024 NWSL Draft from NJ/NY Gotham FC in exchange Racing Louisville FC sent $130,000 in allocation money to Bay FC and NJ/NY Gotham FC received protection in the 2024 NWSL Expansion Draft)	Memphis
Round 4	43	(United States)	Makena Carr ^{#}	M	Seattle Reign FC	(Note: Bay FC → Seattle Reign FC. Seattle Reign FC acquired the No.43 overall pick in the 2024 NWSL Draft from Bay FC in exchange for the No. 55 pick in the 2024 NWSL Draft and $75,000 in allocation money.)	Saint Mary's
Round 4	44	(United States)	Jessica Garziano ^{#}	M	Angel City FC	(Note: Utah Royals → Angel City FC. Angel City FC acquired the No.44 overall pick in the 2024 NWSL Draft from Utah Royals in exchange for $15,000 in allocation money.)	St. John's
Round 4	45	(United States)	Celia Gaynor ^{#}	M	Chicago Red Stars		Michigan State
Round 4	46	(United States)	Hope Hisey ^{#}	G	Kansas City Current		Arizona
Round 4	47	(United States)	Alyssa Bourgeois ^{#}	D	Houston Dash		Santa Clara
Round 4	48	(United States)	Sam Cary	D	Racing Louisville FC		Iowa
Round 4	49	(United States)	Courtney Brown	M	Washington Spirit		Utah
Round 4	50	(United States)	Alex Kerr	F	Orlando Pride		Texas Tech
Round 4	51	(United States)	Madison Curry	D	Angel City FC		Princeton
Round 4	52	(United States)	Landy Mertz	F	North Carolina Courage		Pittsburgh
Round 4	53	(United States)	Katie Duong ^{#}	M	Portland Thorns FC		Stanford
Round 4	54	(United States)	Madison White ^{#}	G	Racing Louisville FC	(Note: San Diego Wave FC → Racing Louisville FC . Racing Louisville FC acquired $40,000 in allocation money and the No.54 overall pick from San Diego Wave FC in exchange for the No.42 pick in the 2024 NWSL Draft.)	Texas Tech
Round 4	55	(Tonga)	Laveni Vaka ^{#}	D	Bay FC	(Note: Seattle Reign FC → Bay FC. Bay FC acquired the No.55 overall pick in the 2024 NWSL Draft and $75,000 in allocation money from Seattle Reign FC in exchange for the No. 43 pick in the 2024 NWSL Draft.)	BYU
Round 4	56	(United States)	Talia Gabarra ^{#}	M	Orlando Pride	(Note: NJ/NY Gotham FC → Orlando Pride. Orlando Pride acquired the natural fourth-round pick in the 2024 NWSL Draft and $350,000 in allocation money from NJ/NY Gotham FC in exchange for the No. 2 pick in the 2023 NWSL Draft.)	UCF

=== Notable undrafted players ===
Below is a list of undrafted rookies who appeared in a competitive NWSL game in 2024.

Nat.	Player	Pos.	Original NWSL team	College
(United States)	Madison Ayson	D	Houston Dash	Xavier
(United States)	Ally Cook	F	Chicago Red Stars	UCLA
(United States)	Mallie McKenzie	M	Portland Thorns FC	Georgia
(United States)	Maddie Moreau	D	Bay FC	West Virginia
(United States)	Heather Stainbrook	M	Washington Spirit	Utah Valley

== Trades ==
Round 1:

Round 2:

Round 3:

Round 4:

== Summary ==
In 2024, a total of 30 colleges had players selected. Of these, five had a player drafted to the NWSL for the first time: Iowa, Memphis, Pittsburgh, Saint Mary's and Utah State. The draft also saw North Carolina equal the record for most selections from a school in a draft with six.

=== Schools with multiple draft selections ===
Selections	Schools
6	North Carolina
5	BYU, Penn State
4	Clemson
3	Florida State, Stanford, Texas Tech
2	Arkansas, Notre Dame, Pittsburgh, UCLA

=== Selections by college athletic conference ===
Conference	Round 1	Round 2	Round 3	Round 4	Total
ACC	6	7	5	1	19
Big East	0	0	0	1	1
Big Ten	2	4	1	2	9
Big 12	1	2	2	4	9
Ivy League	0	0	0	1	1
Mountain West	0	1	0	0	1
Pac-12	4	0	1	3	8
SEC	1	0	4	0	5
The American	0	0	1	0	1
West Coast	0	0	0	2	2

=== Selections by position ===
Position	Round 1	Round 2	Round 3	Round 4	Total
Goalkeeper	0	0	4	2	6
Defender	5	5	3	4	17
Midfielder	6	4	4	6	20
Forward	3	5	3	2	13

== Future draft trades ==
2025 NWSL Draft trades

- Round 3 (conditional), Racing Louisville FC → Washington Spirit. Washington Spirit acquired the natural second-round pick in the 2024 NWSL Draft, and a conditional third-round draft pick in the 2025 NWSL Draft if she reaches 10 appearances in 2024, from Racing Louisville FC in exchange for Jordan Baggett.

== See also ==
- List of drafts held by the NWSL
- List of National Women's Soccer League draftees by college team
- 2024 National Women's Soccer League season
