= Tatum Thomason =

American soccer player (born 2004)

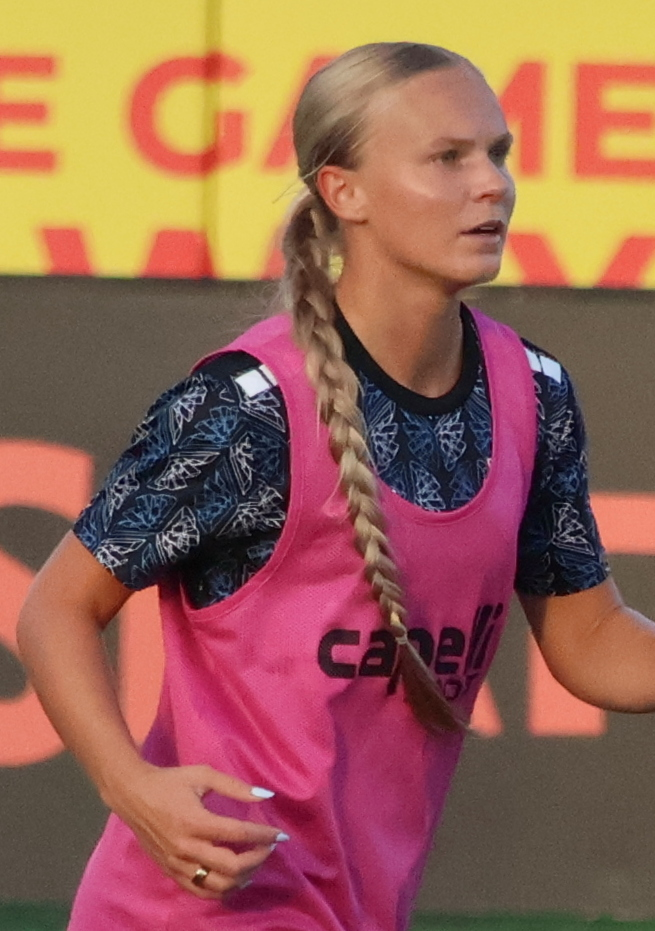
- Thomas with DC Power FC in 2026

Personal information
- Date of birth: March 30, 2004 (age 22)
- Place of birth: Peoria, Arizona, U.S.
- Height: 5 ft 5 in (1.65 m)
- Positions: Forward; midfielder

Team information
- Current team: DC Power FC
- Number: 7

Youth career
- SC del Sol

College career
Years	Team	Apps	(Gls)
2022–2024	Washington Huskies	51	(8)
2025	Arizona State Sun Devils	19	(7)

Senior career*
Years	Team	Apps	(Gls)
2024	SC del Sol	6	(14)
2026–	DC Power FC	7	(2)
- * Club domestic league appearances and goals as of 18:29, September 27, 2026 (UTC)

Tatum Thomason (born March 30, 2004) is an American professional soccer player who plays as a forward or midfielder for USL Super League club DC Power FC. She played college soccer for the Washington Huskies and the Arizona State Sun Devils.

== Early life ==
Thomason was born and raised in Peoria, Arizona, the daughter of parents Heidi and Jason Thomason. She spent her first few years of her soccer journey playing at her local church before eventually joining club team SC del Sol. She attended Liberty High School, where she recorded 54 goals and 36 assists over two seasons of prep soccer. Her Liberty career was decorated with two first-team all-state selections and one regional player of the year honor, as well as the 2022 Arizona Gatorade Player of the Year award.

== College career ==
=== Washington Huskies ===
As a freshman with the Washington Huskies in 2022, Thomason earned the starting nod in each of her first seven collegiate matches. She went on to total 11 appearances in her rookie year, though never earning over 70 minutes in a single match. On August 21, 2022, she scored her first college goal, contributing to a 5–0 win over Air Force. Thomason ascended to a more prominent role in 2023, participating in all of Washington's matches and starting all but one. She led the Huskies with 6 goals, including four game-winners. In November 2023, she registered her first career brace, striking twice in a shutout win over rivals Washington State.

In the offseason before her junior year of college, Thomason re-joined her former youth club, SC del Sol, as a member of the organization's Women's Premier Soccer League squad. She opened the 2024 season with a hat-trick and ended it with a six-goal performance in SC del Sol's season finale. She was twice awarded WPSL regional Player of the Week honors and ended the season tied for third on the overall league scoring leaderboard. Her efforts helped SC del Sol finish as conference champions for the second year in a row.

Thomason rounded out her Huskies career with a 2024 season during which she started all of her team's matches for the first time. While at Washington, Thomason was also a member of the school's Fellowship of Christian Athletes.

=== Arizona State Sun Devils ===
In 2025, Thomason returned to her native Arizona, transferring to Arizona State University. Across 19 appearances as a Sun Devil, she ranked highest on the team with 7 goals. In September 2024, she was included on TopDrawerSoccer's national Team of the Week as an honorable mention. She was named second-team All-Big 12 at the end of the year.

== Club career ==
Thomason spent time in early 2026 as a preseason trialist for National Women's Soccer League club Portland Thorns FC. Despite being called on as a substitute for Cassandra Bogere in a preseason friendly against Monterrey, she ultimately did not make the Thorns' final roster.

On July 10, 2026, Thomason was announced to have signed her first professional contract with USL Super League club DC Power FC. She made her professional debut on August 15, 2026, earning the start in DC Power's season-opening loss to the Carolina Ascent. On September 22, she scored her first two professional goals, including an 89th-minute game-winner, to help DC Power beat Fort Lauderdale United.

== Honors and awards ==
Individual

- Second-team All-Big 12: 2025
