= 2016 Big Ten women's soccer tournament =

- Classification: Division I
- Teams: 8
- Matches: 7
- Site: Robbie Stadium; St. Paul, Minnesota (Semifinals and Final)
- Champions: Minnesota (2nd title)
- Winning coach: Stefanie Golan (1st title)
- Broadcast: BTN (Semifinals and Final)

2016 Big Ten Conference women's soccer standings
| | Conf. | | | | | | Overall |
| Team | W | | L | | T | PCT | W | | L | | T | PCT |
|---|---|---|---|---|---|---|---|---|---|---|---|---|
| No. 18 Northwestern ‍†‍‍^{y} | 7 | – | 1 | – | 3 | .773 | 16 | – | 3 | – | 4 | .783 |
| No. 15 Minnesota ‍†‍‡‍^{y} | 7 | – | 1 | – | 3 | .773 | 16 | – | 3 | – | 4 | .783 |
| Penn State ‍†‍‍^{y} | 7 | – | 1 | – | 3 | .773 | 12 | – | 5 | – | 4 | .667 |
| Michigan ‍‍‍^{y} | 6 | – | 3 | – | 2 | .636 | 10 | – | 5 | – | 5 | .625 |
| Wisconsin ‍‍‍^{y} | 5 | – | 2 | – | 4 | .636 | 9 | – | 5 | – | 8 | .591 |
| Nebraska ‍‍‍^{y} | 5 | – | 3 | – | 3 | .591 | 11 | – | 6 | – | 5 | .614 |
| No. 25 Rutgers ‍‍‍^{y} | 4 | – | 2 | – | 5 | .591 | 12 | – | 5 | – | 6 | .652 |
| Ohio State ‍‍‍^{y} | 4 | – | 4 | – | 3 | .500 | 11 | – | 7 | – | 3 | .595 |
| Indiana ‍‍‍ | 4 | – | 4 | – | 3 | .500 | 7 | – | 9 | – | 4 | .450 |
| Michigan State ‍‍‍ | 4 | – | 7 | – | 0 | .364 | 7 | – | 10 | – | 1 | .417 |
| Illinois ‍‍‍ | 3 | – | 6 | – | 2 | .364 | 6 | – | 11 | – | 2 | .368 |
| Purdue ‍‍‍ | 2 | – | 8 | – | 1 | .227 | 4 | – | 12 | – | 1 | .265 |
| Iowa ‍‍‍ | 2 | – | 9 | – | 0 | .182 | 8 | – | 11 | – | 0 | .421 |
| Maryland ‍‍‍ | 1 | – | 10 | – | 0 | .091 | 3 | – | 15 | – | 1 | .184 |
† – Conference champion ‡ – 2016 Big Ten Tournament champion y – Invited to the NCAA tournament As of 2016-11-21; Rankings from NSCAA

The 2016 Big Ten Conference women's soccer tournament was the postseason women's soccer tournament for the Big Ten Conference. It was held from October 30 to November 6, 2016. The seven match tournament began with first round matches held at campus sites, before moving to Elizabeth Lyle Robbie Stadium in Saint Paul, Minnesota for the semifinals and final. The eight-team single-elimination tournament consisted of three rounds based on seeding from regular season conference play.

Minnesota Golden Gophers earned a number 4 seed at the NCAA women’s soccer tournament after defeating Rutgers Scarlet Knights 2–1 in the final.

== Bracket ==
Quarterfinals; Sunday, Oct 30
1 | Minnesota | 3
8 | Indiana | 1
4 | Michigan | 1 (4)
5 | Wisconsin | 1 (2)
2 | Penn State | 0
7 | Rutgers | 2
3 | Northwestern | 0 (4)
6 | Nebraska | 0 (3)

Semifinals; Friday, Nov 4
1 | Minnesota | 1
4 | Michigan | 0
7 | Rutgers | 1
3 | Northwestern | 0

Final; Sunday, Nov 6
1 | Minnesota | 2
7 | Rutgers | 1

== Schedule ==
=== Quarterfinals ===
| October 30, 2016 | #1 Minnesota | 3–1 | #8 Indiana | St. Paul, Minnesota |
| 3:00 p.m. EST | Julianna Gernes 3'; Josee Stiever 37'; Sydney Squires 84' | Report | Mykayla Brown 81' | Stadium: Elizabeth Lyle Robbie Stadium; Attendance: 370; Referee: Christopher Koloffon |

| October 30, 2016 | #2 Penn State | 0–2 | #7 Rutgers | State College, Pennsylvania |
| 1:00 p.m. EST | | Report | Erica Murphy 28'; Madison Tiernan 72' | Stadium: Jeffrey Field; Attendance: 701; Referee: Tori Penso |

| October 30, 2016 | #3 Northwestern | 0–0 (a.e.t.) (4–3 p) | #6 Nebraska | Evanston, Illinois |
| 4:00 p.m. EST | | Report | | Stadium: Martin Stadium; Attendance: 531; Referee: Josh Kelley |
| | Penalties |
| | Maddy Lucas (penalty scored); Nandi Mehta (penalty scored); Kim Jerantowski (penalty scored); Kayla Sharples (penalty missed); Marisa Viggiano (penalty scored) | | (penalty scored) Nikki Turney; (penalty scored) Jaycie Johnson; (penalty missed) Emily O'Neal; (penalty missed) Caroline Flynn; (penalty scored) Sami Reinhard |

| October 30, 2016 | #4 Michigan | 1–1 (a.e.t.) (4–2 p) | #5 Wisconsin | Ann Arbor, Michigan |
| 4:00 p.m. EST | Nicky Waldeck 26' | Report | Emily Borgmann 37' | Stadium: UM Soccer Stadium; Attendance: 605; Referee: Carmen Serbio |
| | Penalties |
| | Reilly Martin (penalty scored); Nicky Waldeck (penalty scored); Anna Soccorsi (penalty scored); Ani Sarkisian (penalty scored) | | (penalty missed) Micaela Powers; (penalty missed) Morgan Taylor; (penalty scored) Rose Lavelle; (penalty scored) Payton Wesley |

=== Semi-finals ===
| November 4, 2016 | #1 Minnesota | 1–0 | #4 Michigan | St. Paul, Minnesota |
| 3:00 p.m. EST | Julianna Gernes 8' | Report | | Stadium: Elizabeth Lyle Robbie Stadium; Attendance: 552; Referee: John McCloskey |

| November 4, 2016 | #7 Rutgers | 1–0 | #3 Northwestern | St. Paul, Minnesota |
| 5:30 p.m. EST | Colby Ciarrocca 7' | Report | | Stadium: Elizabeth Lyle Robbie Stadium; Attendance: 552; Referee: Rebecca Pagan |

=== Final ===
| November 6, 2016 | #1 Minnesota | 2–1 | #7 Rutgers | St. Paul, Minnesota |
| 2:00 p.m. EST | Sydney Squires 27'; Emily Heslin 85' | Report | Chantelle Swaby 84' | Stadium: Elizabeth Lyle Robbie Stadium; Attendance: 954; Referee: Peter Dhima |

== Awards ==
Individual Awards

- Offensive Player of the Tournament: Sydney Squires, Minnesota
- Defensive Player of the Tournament: Tori Burnett, Minnesota

2016 Big Ten Women's Soccer All-Tournament team

- Mykayla Brown, Indiana
- Nicky Waldeck, Michigan
- Tori Burnett, Minnesota
- Emily Heslin, Minnesota
- Sydney Squires, Minnesota
- Sydney Miramontez, Nebraska
- Nikia Smith, Northwestern
- Nickolette Driesse, Penn State
- Chantelle Swaby, Rutgers
- Madison Tiernan, Rutgers
- Rose Lavelle, Wisconsin
