= Peyton McNamara =

Jamaican footballer (born 2002)

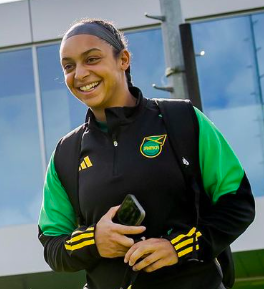

Personal information
- Full name: Peyton James McNamara
- Date of birth: 22 February 2002 (age 24)
- Place of birth: Norwalk, Connecticut, United States
- Height: 1.78 m (5 ft 10 in)
- Position: Midfielder

Team information
- Current team: Ohio State Buckeyes
- Number: 9

Youth career
- 2016–2019: McMahon Senators

College career
Years	Team	Apps	(Gls)
2020–2024	Ohio State Buckeyes	73	(15)

International career^{‡}
2020	Jamaica U20	6	(0)
2021–	Jamaica	7	(0)
- ‡ National team caps and goals as of 31 October 2024

Peyton James McNamara (born 22 February 2002) is a professional footballer who plays as a midfielder. Born in the United States, she represents Jamaica internationally. She played collegiately for the Ohio State Buckeyes.

== Club career ==
McNamara was invited to train as a non-roster player with Chicago Stars FC in the 2025 preseason.

== International career ==
Born in the United States, McNamara is eligible to represent Jamaica internationally through her mother's heritage, and she first played for the U20 team in 2020.

McNamara received her first call-up to the senior team in June 2021. She then made her senior international debut against Nigeria on 10 June 2021.
