= Emma Jaskaniec =

American soccer player (born 2001)

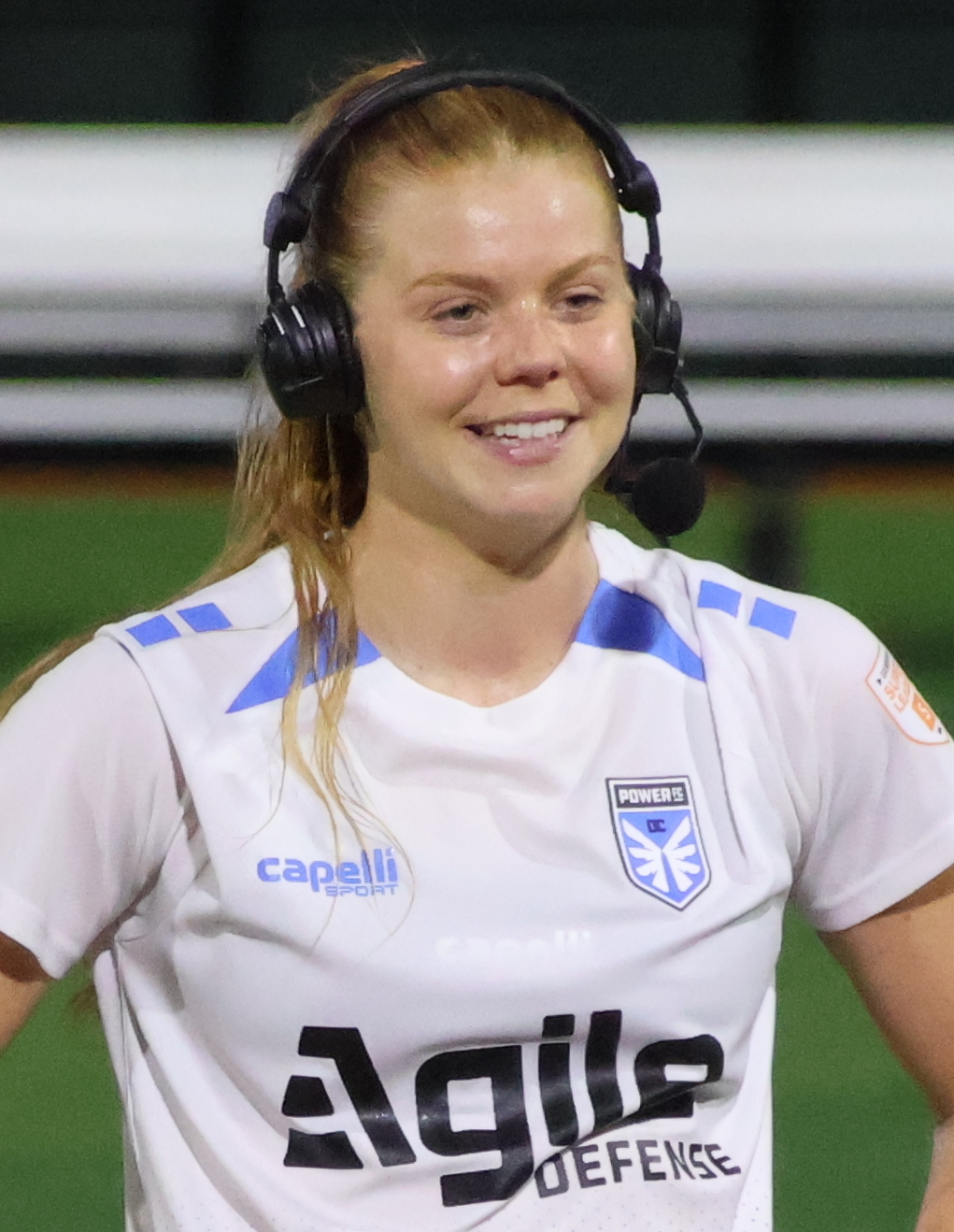
- Jaskaniec with DC Power FC in 2026

Personal information
- Full name: Emma Katherine Jaskaniec
- Date of birth: May 17, 2001 (age 25)
- Place of birth: Menomonee Falls, Wisconsin, U.S.
- Height: 5 ft 8 in (1.73 m)
- Position: Midfielder

Team information
- Current team: DC Power FC
- Number: 18

Youth career
- FC Wisconsin

College career
Years	Team	Apps	(Gls)
2019–2023	Wisconsin Badgers	91	(37)

Senior career*
Years	Team	Apps	(Gls)
2024–2026	Spokane Zephyr	55	(5)
2026–	DC Power FC	2	(1)
- * Club domestic league appearances and goals as of August 21, 2026

Emma Katherine Jaskaniec (born May 17, 2001) is an American professional soccer player who plays as a midfielder for USL Super League club DC Power FC. She played college soccer for the Wisconsin Badgers and was selected by the Utah Royals in the second round of the 2024 NWSL Draft.

== Early life ==
Jaskaniec was born and raised in Menomonee Falls, Wisconsin, where she attended Menomonee Falls High School. She began playing soccer at age five, eventually joining local club team FC Milwaukee (now FC Wisconsin) in the Elite Clubs National League. Jaskaniec was invited to ECNL national training camps in two separate years. She was also invited to train with Paris Saint-Germain and Manchester City in 2018 as part of the clubs' Integrated Training Camp. In 2018, Jaskaniec was named the ECNL U17 Midwest Conference Player of the Year.

== College career ==
At age 14, Jaskaniec committed to the University of Wisconsin–Madison. She graduated a year early and started playing with the Wisconsin Badgers in 2019. In her first year with the Bulldogs, she played in all but one of the team's games on their way to a Big Ten regular-season title. She scored her first college goal on September 29, 2019, in a 3–0 win over Penn State. Jaskaniec started all of Wisconsin's games in her sophomore and junior year. She was on track to continuing the streak in 2022 before picking up a season-ending injury during a match on October 13.

Despite being sidelined for the remainder of her senior year, Jaskaniec was named the Big Ten Midfielder of the Year and included in the All-American Second Team. In 2023, she returned to the field for her final college season as a redshirt senior. After leading the team in points and scoring 9 goals in the final 10 games of the season, Jaskaniec was named to the All-Big Ten and All-Region first teams. She left Wisconsin with 91 appearances and 37 goals recorded.

== Club career ==
=== Spokane Zephyr ===
Jaskaniec was selected in the 2024 NWSL Draft by the Utah Royals. She was picked in the second round and 26th overall after a hectic draft night that included a power outage. Although Jaskaniec was included in the Royals' 2024 preseason roster, the club ultimately did not sign her ahead of their return season to the NWSL.

On May 23, 2024, Jaskaniec signed her first professional contract with USL Super League club Spokane Zephyr FC. She scored her first goal with Spokane on October 13, 2024, in a 3–2 defeat at the hands of Lexington SC. She ended up making a total of 27 appearances (25 starts) in her rookie season with the Zephyr.

In Spokane's third match of the 2025–26 season, Jaskaniec scored a 90th-minute, long-distance goal against Brooklyn FC to tie the game, 1–1, and snatch a point for the Zephyr. Her goal was later named the USL Super League's goal of the month for September 2025. The Zephyr went on to experience some difficulties through the start of its second season as the club underwent a coaching change. On December 6, 2025, Jaskaniec scored Spokane's first goal in over a month against league leaders Lexington SC that nearly secured a victory before Addie McCain scored a late equalizer. At the end of the season, she was named to the USL Super League All-League Second Team. In May 2026, the Zephyr folded after two seasons. Jaskaniec is the club's all-time leader in appearances, with 55.

=== DC Power FC ===
On July 7, 2026, it was announced that Jaskaniec had joined fellow USL Super League club DC Power FC alongside former Zephyr teammate Sarah McCoy. She debuted for the club on August 15, 2026, earning the start in DC Power's season-opening loss to the Carolina Ascent. The following match, Jaskaniec scored her first goal for DC, contributing to a 4–1 win over Brooklyn FC. On September 18, she scored again, this time a backheel finish to tie up the game against the Tampa Bay Sun.

== Personal life ==
Jaskaniec has spoken openly about her struggles with mental health and anxiety. She has cited meditation as a key activity that has improved her mental health and playing performance.

== Career statistics ==
=== Club ===
As of May 27, 2026

Appearances and goals by club, season and competition
Club	Season	League			Playoffs		Total	
Club	Season	Division	Apps	Goals	Apps	Goals	Apps	Goals
Spokane Zephyr FC	2024–25	USL Super League	27	1	—		27	1
Spokane Zephyr FC	2025–26	USL Super League	28	4	—		28	4
Career total			55	5	0	0	55	5

== Honors and awards ==
Wisconsin Badgers

- Big Ten Conference: 2019

Individual

- USL Super League All-League Second Team: 2025–26
- Second-team All-American: 2022
- Big Ten Midfielder of the Year: 2022
- First-team All-Big Ten: 2022, 2023
- Big Ten all-freshman team: 2019
- Big Ten tournament Offensive MVP: 2023
