= Jeffrey Field =

Soccer stadium at Pennsylvania State University

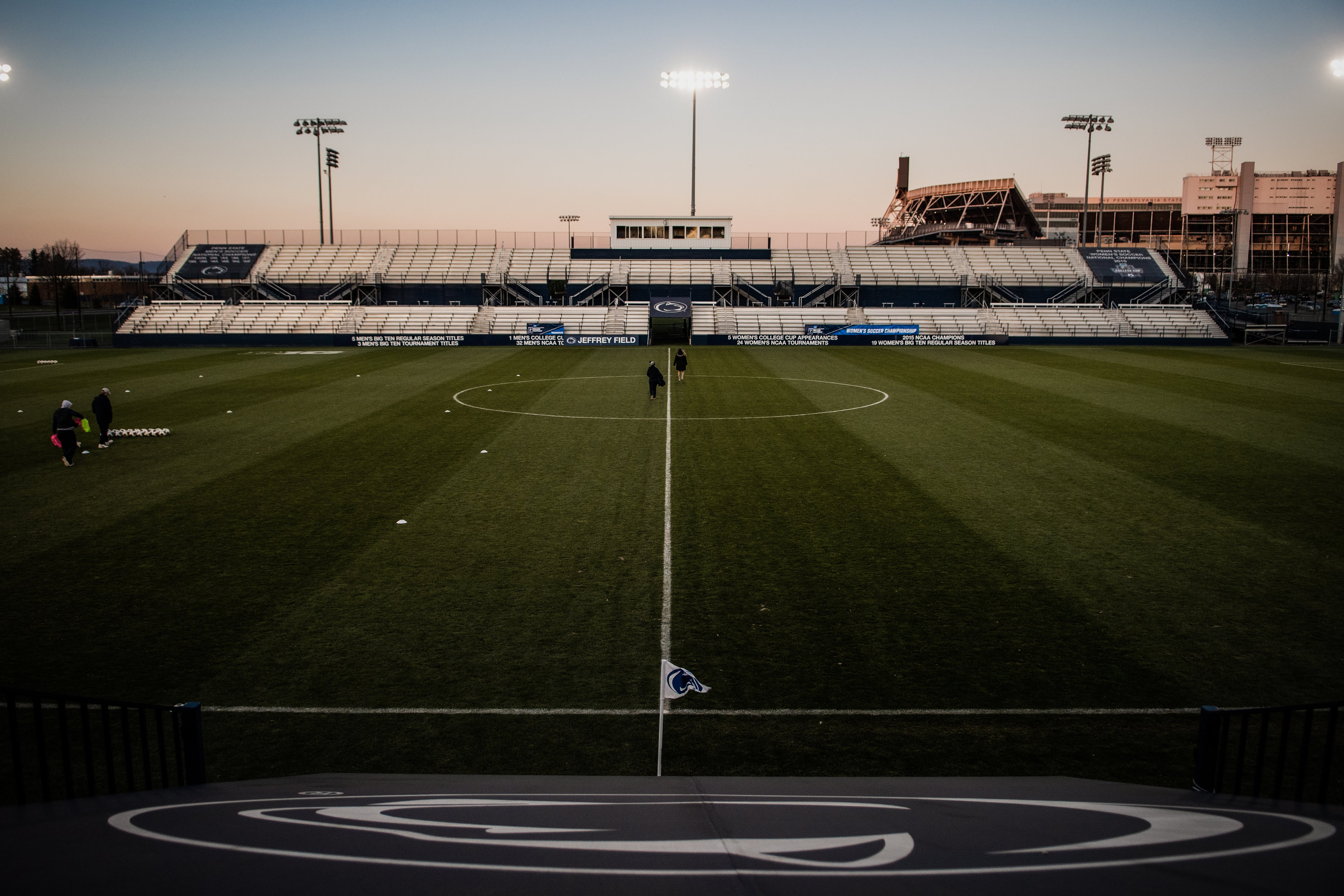
- Lateral view of the stadium in 2019

- Location in Pennsylvania
- Address: State College, PA; United States
- Coordinates: 40°48′37.6308″N 77°51′38.826″W
- Owner: Pennsylvania State University
- Operator: Pennsylvania State University Athletics
- Capacity: 5,000
- Surface: Perennial Ryegrass (natural grass)
- Record attendance: 5,117 (2012 vs. Stanford)
- Current use: Soccer

Construction
- Built: 1969
- Opened: Sept. 29 1972; 53 years ago
- Renovated: List: 1996 New lights installed; 2003 New field surface; 2003 Added press box; 2003 Added broadcast booth; 2007 Practice facility upgrade; 2011 New field surface; 2012 Added outdoor performance center; 2016 Storm drain replacement
- Expanded: 1978 Capacity 3,000; 2003 Capacity 5,000
- Architect: Dant Clayton

Tenants
- Penn State Nittany Lions (NCAA) teams: men's soccer (1972–present); women's soccer (1994–present); men's lacrosse (?–2008); women's lacrosse (?–2008)

Website
- gopsusports.com/jeffrey-field

Jeffrey Field is an outdoor soccer stadium on the campus of Pennsylvania State University in University Park, Pennsylvania. It has been home to Penn State Nittany Lions men's and women's soccer teams since 1972. In past years, the stadium also hosted games of Penn State's men's and women's lacrosse teams.

The stadium was dedicated and named after the late Bill Jeffrey, who was Penn State men's soccer head coach from 1926 until 1952. Jeffrey Field had an initial seating capacity of 2,500, but was later increased to 3,000 in 1978. The stadium's capacity was increased again in 2003 to meet rising ticket needs.

== History ==
Jeffrey Field hosted its first match on September 29, 1972 when Penn State men's soccer faced George Washington University in a pre-season match. 5,000 spectators were in attendance, exceeding the 2,000 person opening capacity of Jeffrey Field by nearly 3,000 spectators. Without seats as fans lined the sides of the field three or more spectators deep to watch the match. This opening game marked the first Penn State athletic event to ever be played at night under stadium floodlights. An opening ceremony was held before the match where the field was dedicated to the former Penn State men’s soccer head Bill Jeffrey, renaming the grounds from East Halls Soccer Fields to Jeffrey Field. The inaugural match ended in an 8-1 victory for the Nittany Lions.

Jeffrey Field was first remodeled in 1978, bleachers were added to expand the capacity to 3,500 along with fencing and a practice field. In 1996 the lights were updated prior to the season start. During the summer of 2003, Jeffrey Field again underwent a facelift. In addition to the installation of a new field surface, a press box and a video booth were also added, and the bleachers were expanded to a capacity of 5,000. Team locker rooms were added in 2013, and in August 2014 branding windscreens were installed.

Jeffrey Field received an upgrade to its practice facility in 2007 when the University replaced the stadium’s practice fields. The project constructed two new fenced practice fields adjacent to Jeffrey Field and Beaver Stadium where the former Penn State baseball field had been located. The project cost the Penn State Athletic department $2.9 million (equivalent to $4,502,889 in 2025) and were opened for use on September 1, 2008.

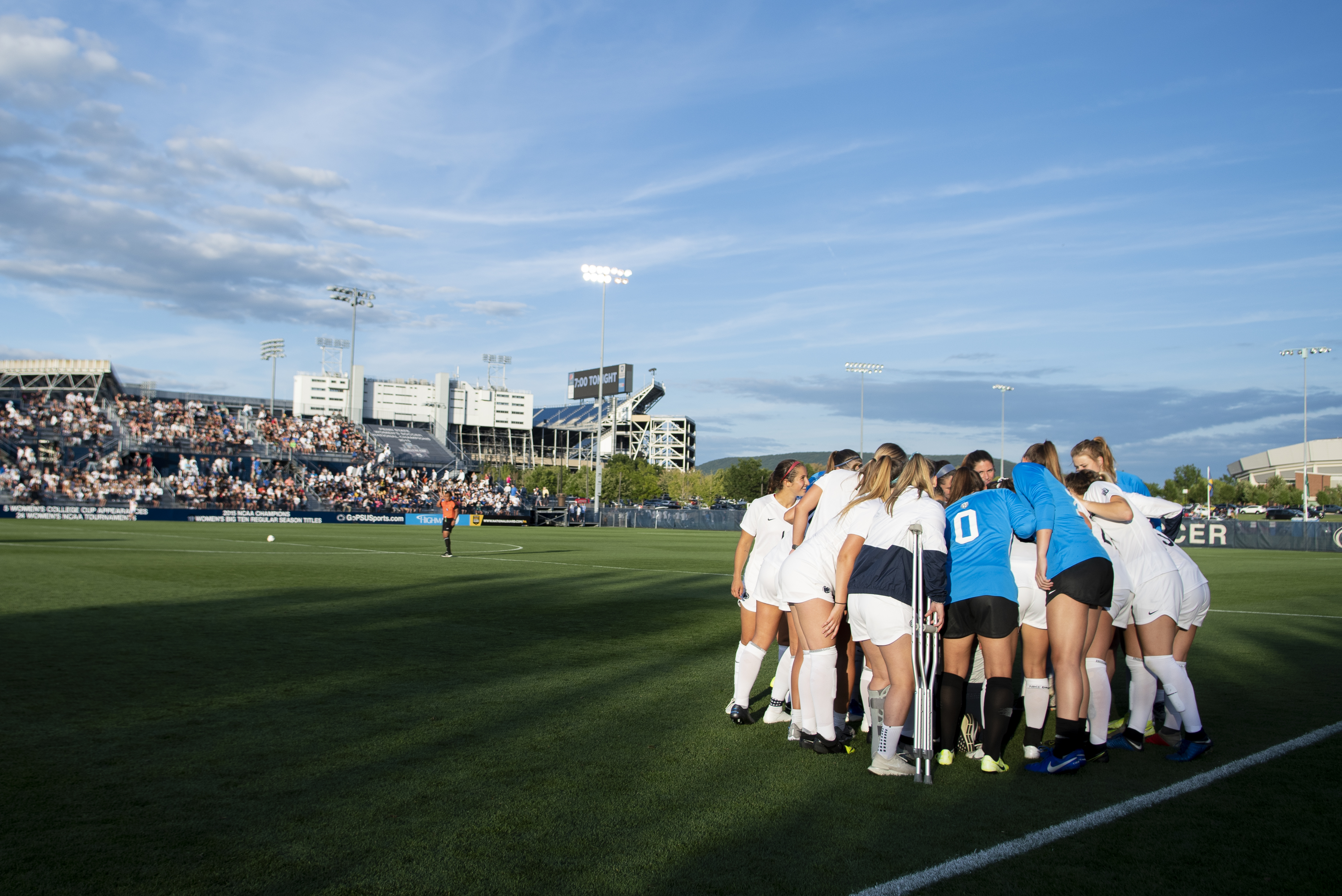
Penn State women's team at Jeffrey Field in 2019

Jeffrey Field was honored in 2006 as the Collegiate Soccer Field of the Year by the SportsTurf Managers Association.

Beginning in the spring of 2010 a renovation of the playing surface took place after a contamination of poa annua was found in the turf. The field surface was changed from Kentucky Bluegrass to Perennial Ryegrass to match the most common grass used in pitches across Europe.

Penn State released their 20-year plan to improve athletic facilities in 2017. Jeffrey Field was included in the renovation plans featuring a new home and visiting locker facilities, covered seating via overhang on the west side of the stadium, renovated restrooms and concessions, a videoboard, lighting around the complex and media facilities. Jeffrey Field’s capacity, will be about 4,000 after completion which will a downsize from the current 5000 person capacity.

Jeffrey Field hosted the semifinals and final of the 2020 Big Ten Women's Soccer Tournament.

Jeffrey Field is set to undergo a $21.25 million renovation that will feature a new soccer operations facility south of the stadium, as well as upgrades to the stadium structure, parking, concessions, and restrooms. Additionally, southeast of Jeffrey Field, Penn State Athletics plans to construct a $10 million air-supported indoor practice facility for Olympic sports programs, similar to the “bubble” practice facilities used by NFL teams. This project was initially projected for completion in October 2025 but is now slated for completion in early 2026.

== Supporters ==
The Park Avenue Army is a supporters group for Penn State men's soccer and Penn State women's soccer. The Park Avenue Army was founded as a Supporters' groups for Penn State Nittany Lions women's soccer team in 2011. The group was named after Park Avenue the street at which Jeffrey Field is located. Members of the group occupy the northwest stand of Jeffrey Field during home matches.
