= Michigan State Spartans women's soccer =

American college soccer team

- Founded: 1985
- University: Michigan State University
- Head coach: Jeff Hosler (6th season)
- Conference: Big Ten
- Location: East Lansing, Michigan, US
- Stadium: DeMartin Stadium (capacity: 2,500)
- Nickname: Spartans
- Colors: Green and white

NCAA tournament Quarterfinals
- 2025

NCAA tournament Round of 16
- 2023, 2024, 2025

NCAA tournament Round of 32
- 2005, 2008, 2022, 2023, 2024, 2025

NCAA tournament appearances
- 2002, 2005, 2008, 2009, 2022, 2023, 2024, 2025, 2026

The Michigan State Spartans women's soccer team represents Michigan State University in NCAA Division I college soccer.

== History ==
Women's soccer at Michigan State started in the fall semester of 1978 when two freshmen, Nancy Hanna and Jody Peebles, formed a women's team in the men's intramural soccer league with some friends. They won only a single game, but were competitive against the men's teams, and demonstrated that there was interest in women's soccer. The following semester, Hanna worked with the men's varsity soccer coach Joe Baum to promote establishing the women's club soccer team. They were able to gather 53 students to form two teams, a recreational squad and a competitive club team with an eight game schedule against other local women's club soccer teams. With Hanna as their goalkeeper and a co-captain, the women won their very first game, against the University of Michigan women's club team, 4-1 on April 22, 1979. The other co-captain, Julie Ebling, scored the team's first ever goal. Led by Coach Charlie Van Nederpelt, the team would go on to be undefeated in their first year.

In 1982, the team received an invitation to the NCAA women's soccer championships, but was ineligible since they did not have varsity status. Over the next few years, students including Annie Kurz and Julie Stachecki campaigned for elevating the team to varsity status. Despite their continued success on the field, the university was reluctant to do so, imposing new conditions and repeatedly rejecting the idea. Finally, in April 1985, Michigan State became the second Big Ten school to field a varsity women's soccer team. The team would begin playing in 1986, competing as an independent with men's soccer coach Joe Baum coaching the women's team as well, assisted by future head coach Tom Saxton.

The varsity team debuted on September 11, 1986 with a 5-0 home win over Kalamazoo. Baum coached both the men's and women's varsity teams concurrently for five seasons. His teams continued the success of the club era, never finishing with fewer than 12 wins over the next 5 years.

Tom Saxton was promoted to head coach in 1991, with Joe Baum continuing to coach the men's soccer team. Saxton coached the team for the next 30 years; his tenure included the program's first NCAA tournament appearance, but was also marked by struggles in conference play. In 1994, the Big Ten conference began sponsoring women's soccer, with Michigan State finishing first in the regular season before falling to Minnesota in the inaugural Big Ten women's soccer tournament. The following seasons saw a reversal of the team's fortunes as they experienced their first losing season, as well as multiple seasons without any conference wins. The 2000s saw a return to form, as the team once again turned in consecutive winning seasons, and made their first trip to the NCAA tournament in 2002, the first of four trips under Saxton. 2005 was the most successful season in the nearly a decade, with a third place finish in the Big Ten followed by the program's first NCAA tournament win. 2008 saw a fourth place finish in the Big Ten and another NCAA tournament win over Milwaukee. Following a third place finish in the Big Ten in 2011, the final decade of Saxton's tenure saw a prolonged drought as the team routinely finished near the bottom of the conference standings.

On June 14, 2021 Jeff Hosler was named the third head coach of the program.

Michigan State women's soccer has appeared in the NCAA tournament in 2002, 2005, 2008, 2009, 2022, 2023, 2024, 2025, and 2026.

== Season-by-Season Results ==
Year	Head Coach	Overall	Conference	Conference Standing	Notes
1986	Joe Baum	15-4-2	-	-	
1987	Joe Baum	14-5-1	-	-	
1988	Joe Baum	14-4-1	-	-	
1989	Joe Baum	14-4-1	-	-	
1990	Joe Baum	12-6-0	-	-	
Joe Baum:		69-23-5			
1991	Tom Saxton	14-6-0	-	-	
1992	Tom Saxton	10-6-2	-	-	
1993	Tom Saxton	12-8-0	-	-	Final year that the Big Ten did not sponsor women's soccer
1994	Tom Saxton	12-5-2	5-1-1	1st	In 1994 the regular season standings were used for Big Ten tournament seeding, and the tournament winner was declared as the conference champion
1995	Tom Saxton	8-8-3	1-3-3	7th	
1996	Tom Saxton	3-17-0	0-7-0	8th	
1997	Tom Saxton	9-10-1	3-5-0	T-7th	
1998	Tom Saxton	6-12-2	0-8-1	10th	
1999	Tom Saxton	6-12-3	3-6-1	T-8th	
2000	Tom Saxton	12-6-5	5-4-1	5th	
2001	Tom Saxton	10-8-2	4-5-1	7th	
2002	Tom Saxton	12-7-2	5-3-2	4th	
2003	Tom Saxton	12-8-0	4-6-0	T-7th	
2004	Tom Saxton	12-7-1	3-6-1	9th	
2005	Tom Saxton	12-6-5	6-2-2	3rd	
2006	Tom Saxton	8-9-1	4-6-0	9th	
2007	Tom Saxton	7-10-2	1-8-1	11th	
2008	Tom Saxton	14-7-3	5-4-1	4th	
2009	Tom Saxton	11-5-4	4-4-2	6th	
2010	Tom Saxton	9-6-4	3-4-3	7th	
2011	Tom Saxton	14-6-1	7-4-0	3rd	
2012	Tom Saxton	8-9-2	2-8-1	T-11th	
2013	Tom Saxton	9-8-2	3-8-0	T-10th	
2014	Tom Saxton	9-9-1	3-9-1	12th	
2015	Tom Saxton	8-6-4	4-5-2	T-9th	
2016	Tom Saxton	7-10-1	4-7-0	10th	
2017	Tom Saxton	6-11-1	2-8-1	12th	
2018	Tom Saxton	5-10-3	0-9-2	14th	
2019	Tom Saxton	8-10-1	1-9-1	14th	
2020	Tom Saxton	1-10-1	1-10-1	13th	Postponed to Spring 2021 due to COVID-19
Tom Saxton:		274-252-56	82-159-29		
2021	Jeff Hosler	10-5-3	5-4-1	4th	
2022	Jeff Hosler	17-3-3	9-0-1	1st	
2023	Jeff Hosler	14-5-3	7-1-2	T-1st	Co-champions with Nebraska
2024	Jeff Hosler	14-3-5	7-1-3	4th	
2025	Jeff Hosler	15-4-6	7-1-3	2nd	
2026	Jeff Hosler	15–4–2	9–3–0	4th	
Jeff Hosler:		84–24–22	43–10–10		
