= Southeastern Conference women's soccer awards =

The Southeastern Conference (SEC) presents several annual honors for the best soccer players of the season. The conference currently presents individual awards for Forward of the Year, Midfielder of the Year, Defender of the Year, Goalkeeper of the Year, and Freshman of the Year. It also presents an award for Coach of the Year.

== Key ==
*	Awarded a national player of the year award: Hermann Trophy (1988–present); Honda Sports Award (1988–present); TopDrawerSoccer National Player of the Year (2011–present)

== Player of the Year (1993–2004) ==
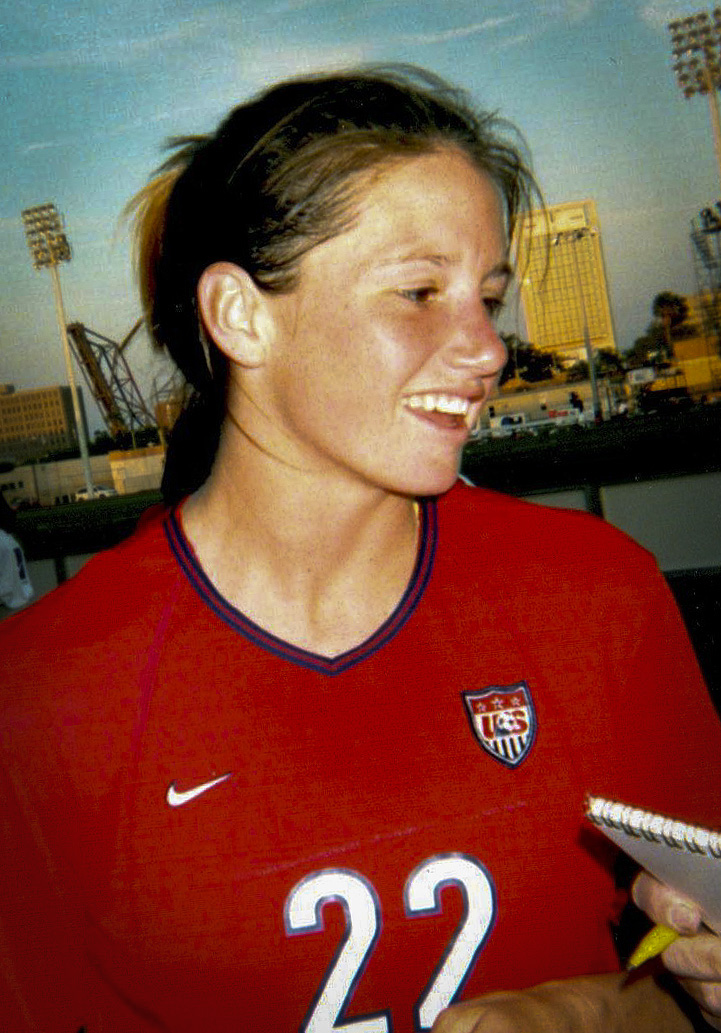
Danielle Fotopoulos, Florida, 2× SEC Player of the Year

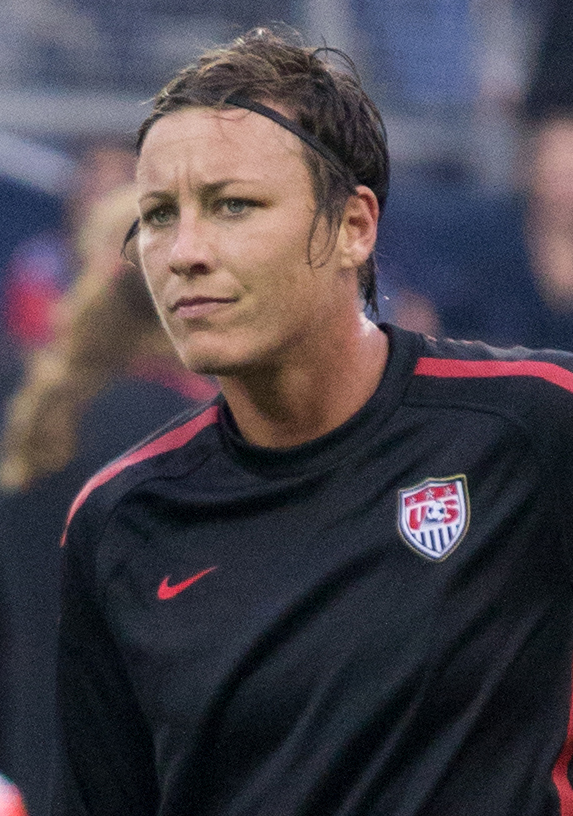
Abby Wambach, Florida, 2× SEC Player of the Year

Southeastern Conference Player of the Year
Season	Player	School	Position	Class	Ref.
1993	Honey Marsh	Arkansas	Midfielder	Junior	
1994	Christine Watson	Vanderbilt		Senior	
1995	Carrie Landrum	Kentucky	Midfielder	Junior	
1996	Danielle Fotopoulos	Florida	Forward	Junior	
1997	Erin Baxter	Florida	Midfielder	Junior	
1998	Danielle Fotopoulos (2) *	Florida	Forward	Senior	
1999	Sarah Yohe	Florida	Forward	Senior	
2000	Abby Wambach	Florida	Forward	Junior	
2001	Abby Wambach (2)	Florida	Forward	Senior	
2002	Sarah Steinmann	Auburn	Midfielder	Sophomore	
2003	Stephanie Freeman	Florida	Forward	Junior	
2004	Stephanie Freeman (2)	Florida	Forward	Senior	

== Offensive Player of the Year (2005–2018) ==
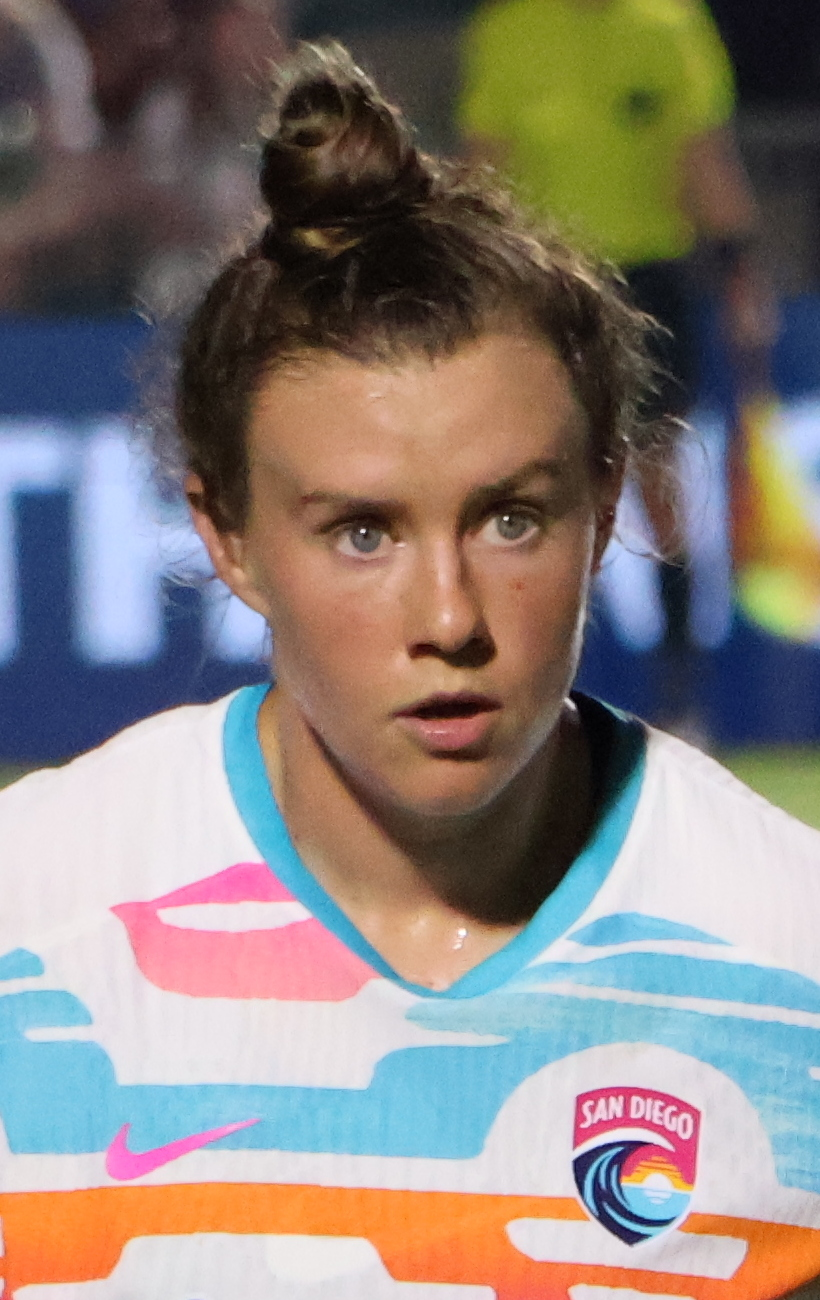
Savannah McCaskill, South Carolina, 2× SEC Offensive Player of the Year

Southeastern Conference Offensive Player of the Year
Season	Player	School	Position	Class	Ref.
2005	Ali Williams	Georgia	Forward	Junior	
2006	Kylee Rossi	Tennessee	Forward	Sophomore	
2007	Kylee Rossi (2)	Tennessee	Forward	Junior	
2008	Malorie Rutledge	LSU	Midfielder	Junior	
2009	Malorie Rutledge (2)	LSU	Midfielder	Senior	
2010	Kayla Grimsley	South Carolina	Midfielder/forward	Junior	
2011	Kayla Grimsley (2)	South Carolina	Forward	Senior	
2012	Erika Tymrak	Florida	Midfielder	Senior	
2013	Savannah Jordan	Florida	Forward	Freshman	
2014	Shea Groom	Texas A&M	Forward	Senior	
2015	Savannah Jordan (2)	Florida	Forward	Junior	
2016	Savannah McCaskill	South Carolina	Forward	Junior	
2017	Savannah McCaskill (2)	South Carolina	Forward	Senior	
2018	Bunny Shaw	Tennessee	Forward	Senior	

== Defensive Player of the Year (2003–2018) ==
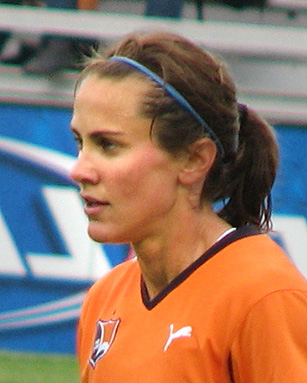
Keeley Dowling, Tennessee, 2× SEC Defensive Player of the Year

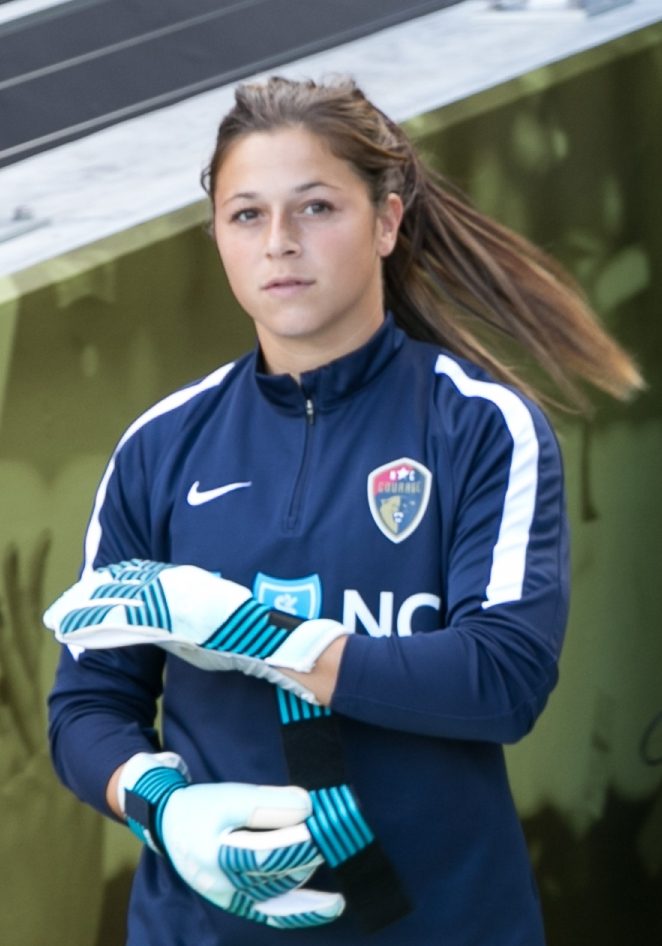
Sabrina D'Angelo, South Carolina, 2× SEC Defensive Player of the Year

Southeastern Conference Defensive Player of the Year
Season	Player	School	Position	Class	Ref.
2003	Keeley Dowling	Tennessee	Defender	Junior	
2004	Keeley Dowling (2)	Tennessee	Defender	Senior	
2005	Tyler Griffin	Vanderbilt	Goalkeeper	Junior	
2006	Ronda Brooks	Auburn	Defender	Senior	
2007	Blakely Mattern	South Carolina	Defender	Sophomore	
2008	Megan Tomlinson	Georgia	Defender	Senior	
2009	Lauren Hyde	Florida	Defender	Senior	
2010	Kat Williamson	Florida	Defender	Sophomore	
2011	Julie King	Auburn	Defender	Senior	
2011	Allysha Chapman	LSU	Midfielder/defender	Senior	
2011	Sabrina D'Angelo	South Carolina	Goalkeeper	Freshman	
2012	Holly King	Florida	Midfielder	Senior	
2013	Sabrina D'Angelo (2)	South Carolina	Goalkeeper	Junior	
2014	Arin Gilliland	Kentucky	Defender	Senior	
2015	Christen Westphal	Florida	Defender	Senior	
2016	Kaleigh Kurtz	South Carolina	Defender	Senior	
2017	Grace Fisk	South Carolina	Defender	Sophomore	
2018	Grace Fisk (2)	South Carolina	Defender	Junior	

== Forward of the Year (2019–present) ==
Southeastern Conference Forward of the Year
Season	Player	School	Class	Ref.
2019	Ally Watt	Texas A&M	Senior	
2020	Anna Podojil	Arkansas	Sophomore	
2021	Mollie Belisle	Georgia	Graduate	
2022	Riley Mattingly Parker	Alabama	Senior	
2023	Ava Tankersley	Arkansas	Senior	
2024	Ava Tankersley (2)	Arkansas	Graduate	
2025	Sydney Watts	Vanderbilt	Junior	
2026	Sydney Watts (2)	Vanderbilt	Senior	

== Midfielder of the Year (2019–present) ==
Southeastern Conference Midfielder of the Year
Season	Player	School	Class	Ref.
2019	Jimena López	Texas A&M	Junior	
2020	Addie McCain	Texas A&M	Senior	
2021	Parker Goins	Arkansas	Senior	
2022	Felicia Knox	Alabama	Junior	
2023	Bea Franklin	Arkansas	Graduate	
2024	Macey Hodge	Mississippi State	Graduate	
2025	Ally Perry	Mississippi State	Senior	
2026	Courtney Jones	Vanderbilt	Senior	

== Defender of the Year (2019–present) ==
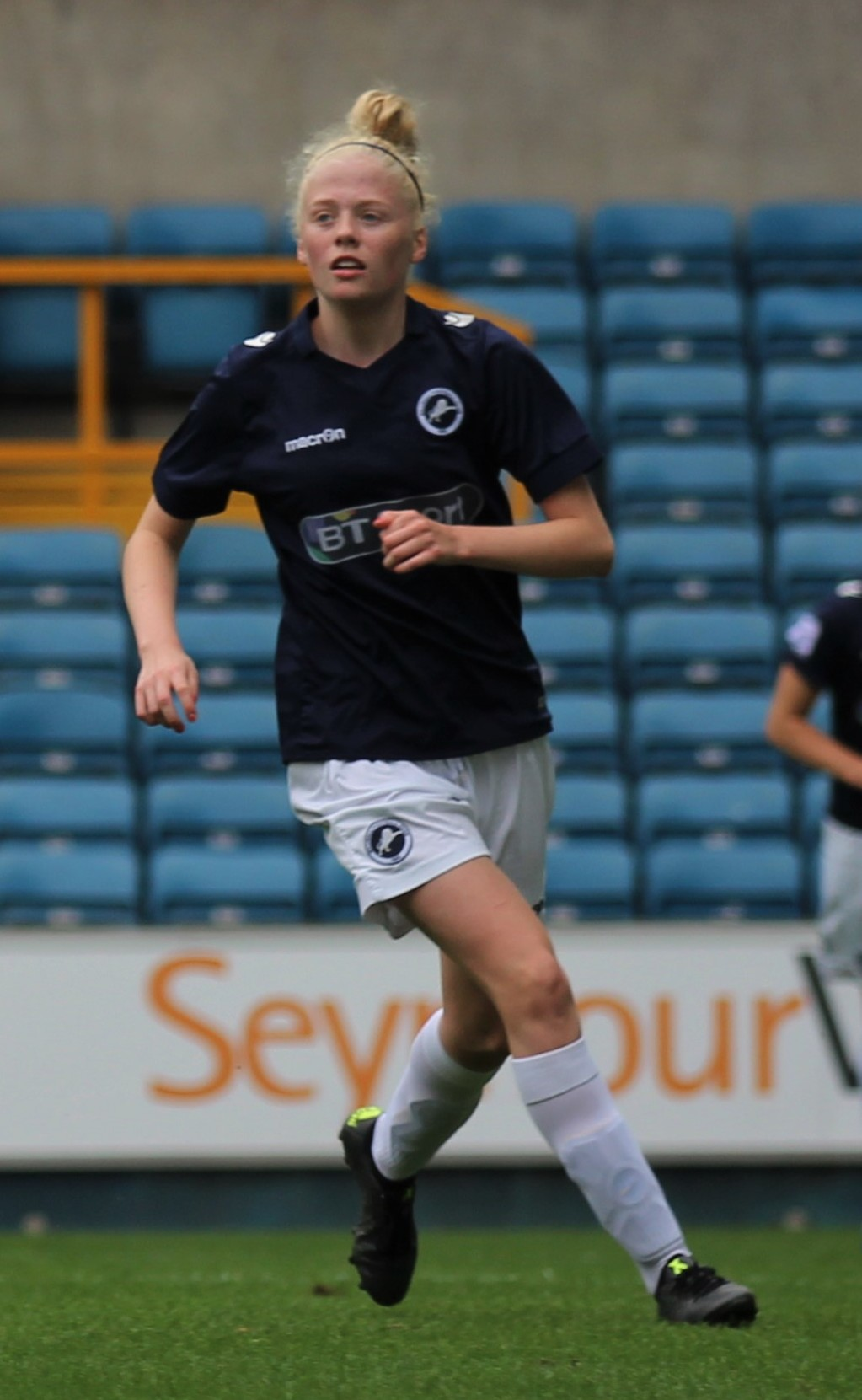
Grace Fisk, South Carolina, 2× SEC Defensive Player of the Year and 1× SEC Defender of the Year

Reagan Schubach, South Carolina, 2026

Southeastern Conference Defender of the Year
Season	Player	School	Class	Ref.
2019	Haley VanFossen	Arkansas	Junior	
2019	Grace Fisk	South Carolina	Senior	
2020	Jimena López	Texas A&M	Senior	
2020	Karlina Sample	Texas A&M	Junior	
2021	Alyssa Malonson	Auburn	Fifth-year	
2022	Reyna Reyes	Alabama	Senior	
2023	Gracie Falla	South Carolina	Sophomore	
2024	Rylie Combs	Mississippi State	Senior	
2025	Gracie Falla (2)	South Carolina	Senior	
2026	Reagan Schubach	South Carolina	Senior	

== Goalkeeper of the Year (2019–present) ==
Southeastern Conference Goalkeeper of the Year
Season	Player	School	Class	Ref.
2019	Mikayla Krzeczowski	South Carolina	Senior	
2020	Ashley Orkus	Ole Miss	Junior	
2021	Ashley Orkus (2)	Ole Miss	Senior	
2022	Ashley Orkus (3)	Ole Miss	Fifth-year	
2023	Heather Hinz	South Carolina	Fifth-year	
2024	Maddy Anderson	Mississippi State	Graduate	
2025	Sara Wojdelko	Vanderbilt	Graduate	
2026	Alexa Gianoplus	Vanderbilt	Graduate	

== Freshman of the Year (1997–present) ==
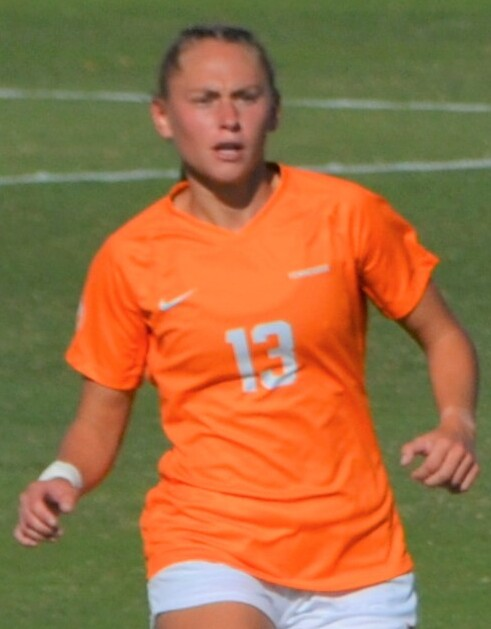
Taylor Huff, Tennessee, 2021

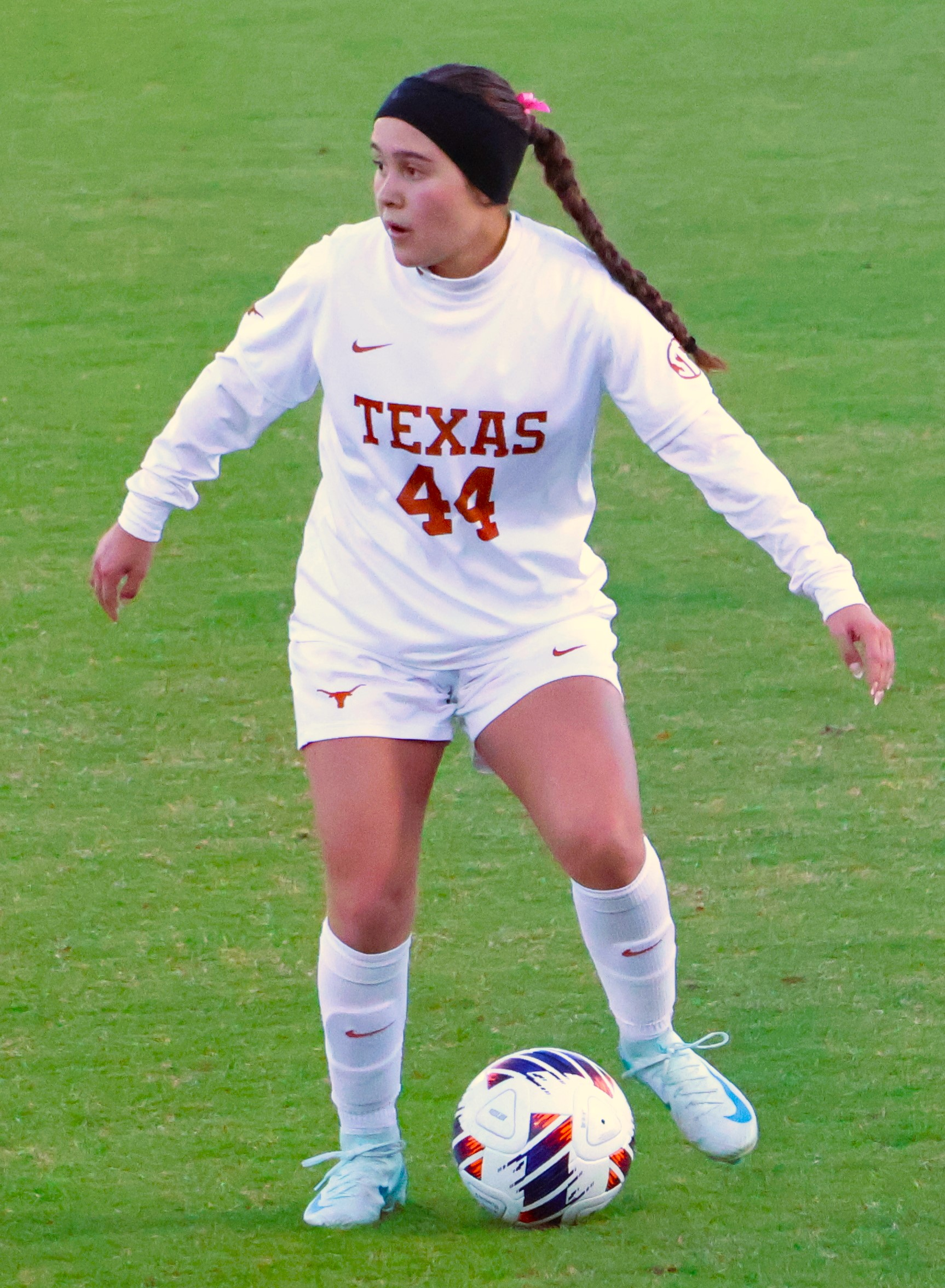
Amalia Villarreal, Texas, 2024

Southeastern Conference Freshman of the Year
Season	Player	School	Position	Ref.
1997	Andi Sellers	Florida	Midfielder	
1999	Keri Boyce	Kentucky	Forward	
2000	Rhian Wilkinson	Tennessee	Forward	
2001	Megan Rivera	Auburn	Goalkeeper	
2002	Kelly Renie	Ole Miss	Forward	
2003	Luisa Marzotto	Mississippi State	Goalkeeper	
2004	Ashley Kirk	South Carolina	Midfielder	
2004	Genna Gorman	Tennessee	Midfielder/forward	
2005	Jennifer Hance	Ole Miss	Midfielder	
2006	Carrie Patterson	Georgia	Forward	
2007	Kelli Corless	Georgia	Defender	
2008	Katy Frierson	Auburn	Midfielder	
2009	Laura Eddy	Georgia	Defender	
2010	Taylor Travis	Florida	Forward	
2011	Sabrina D'Angelo	South Carolina	Goalkeeper	
2012	Merel van Dongen	Alabama	Midfielder	
2013	Savannah Jordan	Florida	Forward	
2014	Savannah McCaskill	South Carolina	Forward	
2015	Cece Kizer	Ole Miss	Midfielder	
2016	Sarah Luebbert	Missouri	Forward	
2017	Deanne Rose	Florida	Forward	
2018	Haley Hopkins	Vanderbilt	Forward	
2019	Anna Podojil	Arkansas	Forward	
2020	Bárbara Olivieri	Texas A&M	Forward	
2021	Taylor Huff	Tennessee	Midfielder	
2022	Gianna Paul	Alabama	Forward	
2023	Megan Hinnenkamp	Florida	Forward	
2023	Summer Denigan	Georgia	Midfielder	
2024	Amalia Villarreal	Texas	Forward	
2025	Ava McDonald	Texas	Forward	
2026	Ireland Churchill	Texas A&M	Forward	

== Newcomer of the Year (2024–present) ==
Southeastern Conference Newcomer of the Year
Season	Player	School	Class	Position	Ref.
2024	Makala Woods	Kentucky	Graduate	Forward	
2025	Larkin Thomason	Alabama	Junior	Forward	
2026	Sydney Middaugh	South Carolina	Senior	Forward	

== Coach of the Year (1993–present) ==
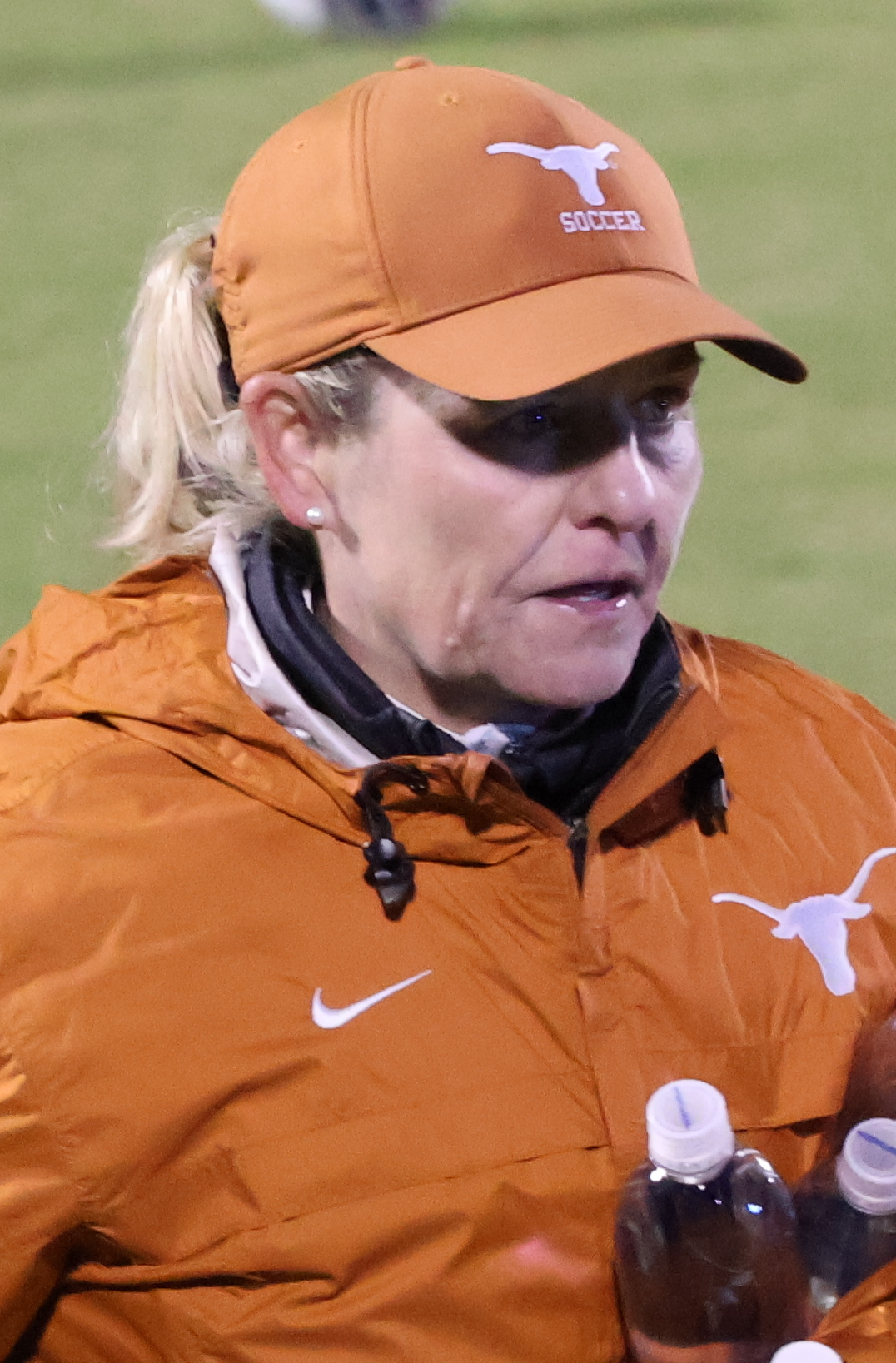
Angela Kelly, Texas, 3× SEC Coach of the Year

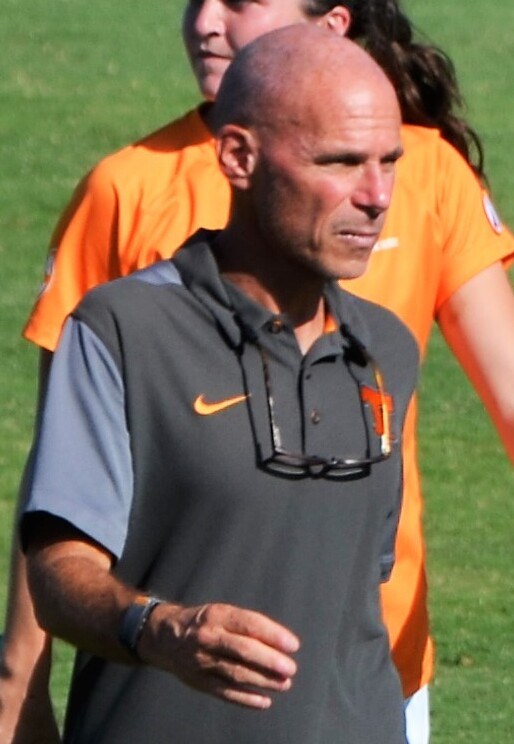
Brian Pensky, Tennessee, 2021

Southeastern Conference Coach of the Year
Season	Player	School	Ref.
1993	Ken McDonald	Vanderbilt	
1994	Don Staley	Arkansas	
1995	Warren Lipka	Kentucky	
1996	Becky Burleigh	Florida	
1997	Ken McDonald	Vanderbilt	
1998	Don Staley (2)	Arkansas	
1999	Warren Lipka (2)	Kentucky	
2000	Becky Burleigh (2)	Florida	
2001	Neil McGuire	Mississippi State	
2002	Karen Hoppa	Auburn	
2003	Angela Kelly	Tennessee	
2004	Angela Kelly (2)	Tennessee	
2005	Angela Kelly (3)	Tennessee	
2005	Ronnie Coveleskie	Vanderbilt	
2006	Warren Lipka (3)	Kentucky	
2007	Patrick Baker	Georgia	
2008	Becky Burleigh (3)	Florida	
2009	Shelley Smith	South Carolina	
2010	Becky Burleigh (4)	Florida	
2011	Shelley Smith (2)	South Carolina	
2012	Becky Burleigh (5)	Florida	
2013	G Guerrieri	Texas A&M	
2014	G Guerrieri (2)	Texas A&M	
2015	Bryan Blitz	Missouri	
2016	Shelley Smith (3)	South Carolina	
2017	Shelley Smith (4)	South Carolina	
2018	Darren Ambrose	Vanderbilt	
2019	Colby Hale	Arkansas	
2020	Colby Hale (2)	Arkansas	
2020	G Guerrieri (3)	Texas A&M	
2021	Brian Pensky	Tennessee	
2022	Wes Hart	Alabama	
2023	Colby Hale (3)	Arkansas	
2024	James Armstrong	Mississippi State	
2025	Colby Hale (4)	Arkansas	
2026	Darren Ambrose (2)	Vanderbilt	

== See also ==
- Atlantic Coast Conference women's soccer awards
- Big 12 Conference women's soccer awards
- Big Ten Conference women's soccer awards
- Pac-12 Conference women's soccer awards
