= List of NCAA Division I women's soccer First-Team All-America teams =

The Division I First-Team All-Americans is an annual list honoring the best performing NCAA Division I women's U.S. college soccer players of the season as selected by United Soccer Coaches (formerly known as the National Soccer Coaches Association of America (NSCAA)).

Throughout its history, the NSCAA All-America teams have not necessarily included exactly eleven players, nor has there been consistency with regards to the positions picked or number of players in each position. The selection was also open to Division II and Division III players until 1988 when it became exclusively for Division I players.

== Teams ==
=== 1980–1985 ===
From 1980 to 1985, the National Soccer Coaches Association of America (NSCAA) selected one All-America team that combined all three divisions.

* – Asterisks indicate number of previous All-America selections

Year	Goalkeeper	Defenders	Midfielders	Forwards
1980	Lori Kats (Lewis & Clark)	Adele Fairman (Texas A&M); Terry Febrey (SUNY Cortland); Deb McKinney (Cincinnati); Madeline Mangini (Massachusetts)	Nancy Clary (North Carolina); DiAnn Kimbrel (Northern Colorado); Nena Odim (Princeton)	Heather Brendel (SUNY Cortland); Jolly Colchetti (UCLA); Frances Fusco (Brown)
1981	Mary Lou Breen (Connecticut)	Terry Febrey* (SUNY Cortland); Dori Kovanen (North Carolina); Meg Metz (Oregon)	Felise Duffy (Connecticut); Joan Gettemeyer (Missouri–St. Louis); Nina Holmstron (Massachusetts); Carol Smith (Texas A&M)	Pam Boughman (UCF); Wendy Greenberg (North Carolina); Stephanie Zeh (North Carolina)
1982	Joan Shockow (SUNY Cortland)	Tracy Brooks (Boston College); Jackie Gaw (Massachusetts); Patty Kelley (Missouri–St. Louis); Helen Negrey (Radford); Lori Palmer (SUNY Cortland)		Joan Gettemeyer* (Missouri–St. Louis); Amy Machin (North Carolina); Megan MacKenzie (Rochester (NY)); Michelle Sedita (UCF); Stephanie Zeh* (North Carolina)
1983	Joan Shockow* (SUNY Cortland)	Suzy Cobb (North Carolina); Heidi Comeau (Vermont); Joan Gettemeyer** (Missouri–St. Louis); Karen Gollwitzer (SUNY Cortland); Lori Stukes (Massachusetts)		Pam Baughman (George Mason); Bettina Bernardi (Texas A&M); Moira Buckley (Connecticut); Stacey Flionis (Massachusetts); Lisa Gmitter (George Mason)
1984	Monica Hall (UC Santa Barbara)	Suzy Cobb* (North Carolina); Leslie Gallimore (California); Liza Grant (Colorado College); Lori Stukes* (Massachusetts); Harriet Tatro (Vermont)		Michelle Akers (UCF); Lori Bessmer (SUNY Cortland); April Heinrichs (North Carolina); Donna MacDougall (Connecticut); Catherine Shankweiler (Connecticut)
1985	Janine Szpara (Colorado College)	Debbie Belkin (Massachusetts); Sharon Hoag (Colorado College); Cathy Klein (SUNY Cortland); Megan McCarthy (William & Mary); Colleen O'Day (Brown)		Pam Baughman* (George Mason); Lori Bessmer* (SUNY Cortland); Kristin Bowsher (Massachusetts); Lisa Gmitter* (George Mason); April Heinrichs* (North Carolina)

=== 1986–1987 ===
From 1986 to 1987, Division I and Division II continued to select one combined team. Division III selected its own team.

* – Asterisks indicate number of previous All-America selections

Year	Goalkeeper	Defenders	Midfielders	Forwards
1986	Janine Szpara* (Colorado College)	Debbie Belkin* (Massachusetts); Marcia McDermott (North Carolina); Megan McCarthy* (William & Mary); Maria Montuori (Boston College); Denise Regas (Cal State East Bay)		Julie Angevine (Wisconsin); Laurie Collier (Cornell); Lisa Gmitter** (George Mason); April Heinrichs** (North Carolina); Jenni Symons (Santa Clara)
1987	Janine Szpara** (Colorado College)	Debbie Belkin** (Massachusetts); Kristin Bowsher* (Massachusetts); Lori Henry (North Carolina); Megan McCarthy** (William & Mary); Carla Werden (North Carolina)		Joy Biefeld (California); Julie Cunningham (William & Mary); Kim Prutting (Connecticut); Jenni Symons* (Santa Clara); Kerri Tashiro (Colorado College)

=== 1988–present ===
Starting in 1988, all three divisions selected their own teams.

* – Asterisks indicate number of previous All-America selections

Year	Goalkeeper	Defenders	Midfielders	Forwards
1988	Janine Szpara*** (Colorado College)	Linda Hamilton (NC State); Karen Nance (UC Santa Barbara); Kim Prutting* (Connecticut); Shelley Separovich (Colorado College); Carla Werden* (North Carolina)		Michelle Akers* (UCF); Joy Biefeld* (California); Shannon Higgins (North Carolina); April Kater (Massachusetts); Jennifer Smith (Cornell)
1989			Joy Biefeld** (California); Diane Hedin (George Mason); Shannon Higgins* (North Carolina); April Kater* (Massachusetts); Robin Lotze (William & Mary); MaryClaire Robinson (Colorado College)	Laura Anton (George Mason); Charmaine Hooper (NC State); Kristine Lilly (North Carolina); Kerri Tashiro* (Colorado College); Gina Vasallo (Boston College) Lori Wallace (University of Cincinnati)
1990	Heather Taggart (Wisconsin)	Julie Foudy (Stanford); Sandra Gaskill (William & Mary); Beth Grecco (Connecticut)		Suzanne Baily (Brown); Brandi Chastain (Santa Clara); Lisa Cole (SMU); Mia Hamm (North Carolina); Charmaine Hooper* (NC State); April Kater** (Massachusetts); Kristine Lilly* (North Carolina); Robin Lotze* (William & Mary)
1991	Heather Taggart* (Wisconsin)	Holly Hellmuth (Massachusetts)	Cathleen Cambria (Connecticut); Amanda Cromwell (Virginia); Karen Ferguson (Connecticut); Julie Foudy* (Stanford); Tisha Venturini (North Carolina)	Kim LeMere (Hartford); Kristine Lilly** (North Carolina); Kari Maijala (Wisconsin); Tiffeny Milbrett (Portland); Andrea Rubio (Virginia)
1992	Saskia Webber (Rutgers)	Holly Hellmuth* (Massachusetts); Jennifer Lewis (Duke)	Karen Ferguson* (Connecticut); Julie Foudy** (Stanford); Tisha Venturini* (North Carolina); Sue Wall (Santa Clara)	Mia Hamm* (North Carolina); Kim LeMere* (Hartford); Kristine Lilly*** (North Carolina); Tiffeny Milbrett* (Portland)
1993	Skye Eddy (George Mason)	Karen Ferguson** (Connecticut); Jessica Fischer (Stanford); Paula Wilkins (Massachusetts)	Cindy Daws (Notre Dame); Jennifer Lalor (Santa Clara); Tisha Venturini** (North Carolina); Kelly Walbert (Duke)	Mia Hamm** (North Carolina); Kara Lee (SMU); Shannon MacMillan (Portland); Sarah Rafanelli (Stanford)
1994	Jennifer Renola (Notre Dame)	Jessica Fischer* (Stanford); Heidi Kocher (Massachusetts); Thori Staples (NC State)	Cindy Daws* (Notre Dame); Jennifer Lalor* (Santa Clara); Jessica Reifer (Hartford); Tisha Venturini*** (North Carolina)	Shannon MacMillan* (Portland); Tiffeny Milbrett** (Portland); Natalie Neaton (William & Mary); Kelly Walbert* (Duke)
1995	Maja Hansen (New Hampshire)	Jessica Fischer** (Stanford); Erin Lynch (Massachusetts); Sara Whalen (Connecticut); Staci Wilson (North Carolina)	Holly Manthei (Notre Dame); Jessica Reifer* (Hartford); Emily Stauffer (Harvard)	Danielle Garrett (SMU); Debbie Keller (North Carolina); Shannon MacMillan** (Portland); Cindy Parlow (North Carolina)
1996	Jennifer Renola* (Notre Dame)	Erin Taylor (Maryland); Sara Whalen* (Connecticut); Staci Wilson* (North Carolina)	Justi Baumgardt (Portland); Cindy Daws** (Notre Dame); Jennifer Lalor** (Santa Clara); Emily Stauffer* (Harvard); Kari Uppinghouse (Nebraska)	Bryn Blalack (Texas A&M); Kerry Connors (Connecticut); Cindy Parlow* (North Carolina)
1997	LaKeysia Beene (Notre Dame)	Jennifer Grubb (Notre Dame); Kate Sobrero (Notre Dame); Stephanie Yarem (Georgia)	Erin Baxter (Florida); Ann Cook (William & Mary); Erica Iverson (Massachusetts); Jennifer McElmury (Minnesota); Laurie Schwoy (North Carolina)	Traci Arkenberg (UCLA); Cindy Parlow** (North Carolina); Sara Whalen** (Connecticut)
1998	Kristin Luckenbill (Dartmouth)	Suzanne Eastman (Dartmouth); Lorrie Fair (North Carolina); Michelle French (Portland)	Kelly Convey (Penn State); Ásthildur Helgadóttir (Vanderbilt); Nikki Serlenga (Santa Clara)	Mandy Clemens (Santa Clara); Danielle Fotopoulos (Florida); Mary-Frances Monroe (Connecticut); Cindy Parlow*** (North Carolina)
1999	Emily Oleksiuk (Penn State)	Danielle Slaton (Santa Clara); Heather Mitts (Florida); Sharolta Nonen (Nebraska)	Kaye Brownlee (Furman); Nikki Serlenga* (Santa Clara); Lorrie Fair* (North Carolina)	Christie Welsh (Penn State); Abby Wambach (Florida); Mandy Clemens* (Santa Clara); Maren Hendershot (BYU)
2000	Emily Oleksiuk* (Penn State)	Jenny Benson (Nebraska); Rhegan Hyypio (Marquette); Jaclyn Ravenia (Richmond); Danielle Slaton* (Santa Clara)	Meghan Anderson (Nebraska); Aleisha Cramer (BYU); Katherine Linder (Hartford); Anne Mäkinen (Notre Dame)	Andrea Cunningham (Miami (OH)); Laura Schott (California); Christie Welsh* (Penn State)
2001	Emily Oleksiuk** (Penn State)	Danielle Borgman (North Carolina); Danielle Slaton** (Santa Clara); Casey Zimny (Connecticut)	Joanna Lohman (Penn State); Mary-Frances Monroe* (UCLA); Aly Wagner (Santa Clara)	Katie Barnes (West Virginia); Christine Sinclair (Portland); Abby Wambach* (Florida); Christie Welsh** (Penn State)
2002	Nicole Barnhart (Stanford)	Lauren Orlandos (Portland); Catherine Reddick (North Carolina); Nandi Pryce (UCLA)	Callie Withers (Stanford); Joanna Lohman* (Penn State); Sarah Popper (Connecticut); Aly Wagner* (Santa Clara)	Chrissie Abbot (West Virginia); Marcia Wallis (Stanford); Courtney Crandell (Charlotte); Christine Sinclair* (Portland)
2003	Leisha Alcia (Illinois)	Keeley Dowling (Tennessee); Nandi Pryce* (UCLA); Catherine Reddick* (North Carolina); Becky Sauerbrunn (Virginia)	Joanna Lohman** (Penn State); Sarah Rahko (Boston College); Lisa Stoi (West Virginia)	Iris Mora (UCLA); Lindsay Tarpley (North Carolina); Amy Warner (Notre Dame); Tiffany Weimer (Penn State)
2004	Nicole Barnhart* (Stanford)	Keeley Dowling* (Tennessee); Holly Gault (Kansas); Natalie Jacobs (UCLA)	Lori Chalupny (North Carolina); Lindsey Huie (Portland); Diana Matheson (Princeton); Leslie Osborne (Santa Clara)	Esmeralda Negron (Princeton); Heather O'Reilly (North Carolina); Christine Sinclair** (Portland); Tiffany Weimer* (Penn State)
2005	Erin McLeod (Penn State)	Melanie Booth (Florida); Stephanie Lopez (Portland); Jill Oakes (UCLA)	Lori Chalupny* (North Carolina); Ali Christoph (Tennessee); Lindsey Huie* (Portland); Ali Krieger (Penn State); Megan Rapinoe (Portland)	Christine Sinclair*** (Portland); Katie Thorlakson (Notre Dame); Tiffany Weimer** (Penn State)
2006	Jillian Loyden (Villanova)	Ali Krieger* (Penn State); Kasey Moore (Texas); Kelly Rowland (Florida State)	Yael Averbuch (North Carolina); Christina DiMartino (UCLA); Yolanda Odenyo (Oklahoma State)	Lauren Cheney (UCLA); Kerri Hanks (Notre Dame); Heather O'Reilly* (North Carolina); India Trotter (Florida State)
2007	Alyssa Naeher (Penn State)	Nikki Krzysik (Virginia); Stephanie Lopez* (Portland); Becky Sauerbrunn* (Virginia); Brittany Taylor (Connecticut)	Yael Averbuch* (North Carolina); Tobin Heath (North Carolina); Meghan Schnur (Connecticut)	Brittany Bock (Notre Dame); Lauren Cheney* (UCLA); Parrissa Eyorokon (Purdue); Kerri Hanks* (Notre Dame); Mami Yamaguchi (Florida State)
2008	Alyssa Naeher* (Penn State)	Carrie Dew (Notre Dame); Becky Edwards (Florida State); Nikki Krzysik* (Virginia)	Amanda DaCosta (Florida State); Christina DiMartino* (UCLA); Teresa Noyola (Stanford)	Lauren Cheney** (UCLA); Kerri Hanks** (Notre Dame); Casey Nogueira (North Carolina); Lindsay Taylor (Stanford)
2009	Kristin Olsen (USC)	Becky Edwards* (Florida State); Whitney Engen (North Carolina); Blakely Mattern (South Carolina)	Mandi Bäck (Dayton); Courtney Barg (Notre Dame); Tobin Heath* (North Carolina); Sophie Schmidt (Portland)	Lauren Cheney*** (UCLA); Michelle Enyeart (Portland); Tiffany McCarty (Florida State); Kelley O'Hara (Stanford)
2010	Bianca Henninger (Santa Clara)	Cassie Dickerson (Ohio State); Crystal Dunn (North Carolina); CoCo Goodson (UC Irvine)	Sinead Farrelly (Virginia); Kristie Mewis (Boston College); Teresa Noyola* (Stanford); Ingrid Wells (Georgetown)	Sarah Hagen (Milwaukee); Melissa Henderson (Notre Dame); Alex Morgan (California); Christen Press (Stanford)
2011	Adrianna Franch (Oklahoma State)	Natasha Anasi (Duke); Camille Levin (Stanford); Melinda Mercado (Oklahoma State); Lizzy Simonin (Memphis)	Morgan Brian (Virginia); Julie Johnston (Santa Clara); Teresa Noyola** (Stanford); Mallory Schaffer (William & Mary); Ingrid Wells* (Georgetown)	Maya Hayes (Penn State); Sydney Leroux (UCLA); Katie Stengel (Wake Forest); Lindsay Taylor* (Stanford); Becca Wann (Richmond)
2012	Adrianna Franch* (Oklahoma State)	Alina Garciamendez (Stanford); Inès Jaurena (Florida State); Lindsi Cutshall (BYU); Rachel Quon (Stanford)	Daphné Corboz (Georgetown); Crystal Dunn* (North Carolina); Julie Johnston* (Santa Clara); Kristie Mewis* (Boston College); Christine Nairn (Penn State)	Zakiya Bywaters (UCLA); Maya Hayes* (Penn State); Caroline Miller (Virginia); Erika Tymrak (Florida)
2013	Sabrina D'Angelo (South Carolina)	Abby Dahlkemper (UCLA); Amanda Frisbie (Portland); Kassey Kallman (Florida State); Emily Menges (Georgetown)	Morgan Brian* (Virginia); Crystal Dunn** (North Carolina); Julie Johnston** (Santa Clara)	Makenzy Doniak (Virginia); Nkem Ezurike (Michigan); Kristen Hamilton (Denver); Jazmine Reeves (Virginia Tech)
2014	Sabrina D'Angelo* (South Carolina)	Kadeisha Buchanan (West Virginia); Whitney Church (Penn State); Abby Dahlkemper* (UCLA); Kristin Grubka (Florida State)	Morgan Brian** (Virginia); Dagný Brynjarsdóttir (Florida State); Shea Groom (Texas A&M); Sam Mewis (UCLA)	Janine Beckie (Texas Tech); Makenzy Doniak* (Virginia); Lynn Williams (Pepperdine)
2015	Sabrina D'Angelo** (South Carolina); Caroline Casey (William & Mary)	Kadeisha Buchanan* (West Virginia); Emily Sonnett (Virginia); Christen Westphal (Florida)	Megan Connolly (Florida State); Ashley Lawrence (West Virginia); Rose Lavelle (Wisconsin); Raquel Rodríguez (Penn State); Andi Sullivan (Stanford)	Rachel Daly (St. John's); Rachel Hill (Connecticut); Savannah Jordan (Florida); Rebecca Wilson (Cal State Fullerton)
2016	Cassie Miller (Florida State)	Maddie Bauer (Stanford); Kadeisha Buchanan** (West Virginia); Christina Gibbons (Duke); Kaleigh Kurtz (South Carolina)	Rachel Corboz (Georgetown); Ashley Lawrence* (West Virginia); Alexis Shaffer (Virginia); Andi Sullivan* (Stanford)	Ashley Hatch (BYU); Savannah McCaskill (South Carolina); Margaret Purce (Harvard); Stephanie Ribeiro (Connecticut)
2017	Casey Murphy (Rutgers)	Tierna Davidson (Stanford); Grace Fisk (South Carolina); Indigo Gibson (California)	Rachel Corboz* (Georgetown); Jessie Fleming (UCLA); Quinn (Note: Then known as Rebecca Quinn) (Duke); Andi Sullivan** (Stanford)	Imani Dorsey (Duke); Catarina Macario (Stanford); Hailie Mace (UCLA); Savannah McCaskill* (South Carolina)
2018	Arielle Schechtman (Georgetown)	Alana Cook (Stanford); Ally Prisock (USC); Kaleigh Riehl (Penn State)	Samantha Coffey (Boston College); Jordan DiBiasi (Stanford); Kelcie Hedge (Santa Clara); Julie James (Baylor); Victoria Pickett (Wisconsin)	Caitlin Farrell (Georgetown); Catarina Macario* (Stanford); Kayla McCoy (Duke); Alessia Russo (North Carolina); Ashley Sanchez (UCLA); Ally Watt (Texas A&M)
2019	Jordyn Bloomer (Wisconsin)	Malia Berkely (Florida State); Grace Fisk* (South Carolina); Emily Fox (North Carolina); Naomi Girma (Stanford); Stasia Mallin (Memphis)	Mikayla Colohan (BYU); Jessie Fleming* (UCLA); Catarina Macario** (Stanford); Brianna Pinto (North Carolina)	Amirah Ali (Rutgers); Kirsten Davis (Texas Tech); Elise Flake (BYU); Tara McKeown (USC); Alessia Russo* (North Carolina); Ally Watt* (Texas A&M)
2020	Emily Alvarado (TCU)	Malia Berkely* (Florida State); Jimena López (Texas A&M); Mijke Roelfsema (Rice)	Mikayla Colohan* (BYU); Jaelin Howell (Florida State); Brianna Pinto* (North Carolina); Lucy Porter (Hofstra); Yazmeen Ryan (TCU); Delanie Sheehan (UCLA)	Amirah Ali* (Rutgers); Penelope Hocking (USC); Ally Schlegel (Penn State); Sydny Nasello (South Florida); Anna Podojil (Arkansas)
2021	Ashley Orkus (Ole Miss)	Naomi Girma* (Stanford); Emily Madril (Florida State); Alia Martin (Michigan); Gabby Provenzano (Rutgers)	Croix Bethune (USC); Mikayla Colohan** (BYU); Parker Goins (Arkansas); Jaelin Howell* (Florida State); Frankie Tagliaferri (Rutgers)	Messiah Bright (TCU); Michelle Cooper (Duke); Diana Ordóñez (Virginia); Miri Taylor (Hofstra); Kelsey Turnbow (Santa Clara)
2022	Lauren Kozal (Michigan State)	Eva Gaetino (Notre Dame); Lyndsey Heckel (Saint Louis); Julia Leas (Georgetown); Reyna Reyes (Alabama)	Korbin Albert (Notre Dame); Hannah Bebar (Harvard); Croix Bethune* (USC); Lia Godfrey (Virginia); Jenna Nighswonger (Florida State)	Trinity Byars (Texas); Michelle Cooper* (Duke); Riley Mattingly Parker (Alabama); Brittany Raphino (Brown); Ally Schlegel* (Penn State)
2023	Madison White (Texas Tech)	Hannah Anderson (Texas Tech); Eva Gaetino* (Notre Dame); Julia Leas* (Georgetown); Lilly Reale (UCLA); Laveni Vaka (BYU)	Jasmine Aikey (Stanford); Onyi Echegini (Florida State); Josefine Hasbo (Harvard); Lexi Missimo (Texas)	Eleanor Dale (Nebraska); Jordynn Dudley (Florida State); Emily Gaebe (Saint Louis); Brecken Mozingo (BYU); Brittany Raphino* (Brown)
2024	Leah Freeman (Duke)	Macy Blackburn (Texas Tech); Brooklyn Courtnall (USC); Lilly Reale* (UCLA)	Maggie Graham (Duke); Macey Hodge (Mississippi State); Taylor Huff (Florida State); Helena Sampaio (USC)	Kailyn Dudukovich (Ohio State); Kate Faasse (North Carolina); Caiya Hanks (Wake Forest); Ava Tankersley (Arkansas)
2025	Jordan Nytes (Colorado)	Elise Evans (Stanford); Leah Klenke (Notre Dame); Finley Lavin (Memphis); Hannah McLaughlin (Vanderbilt)	Summer Denigan (Georgia); Lia Godfrey* (Virginia); Ally Perry (Mississippi State); Kat Rader (Duke)	Jasmine Aikey* (Stanford); Seven Castain (TCU); Jordynn Dudley* (Florida State); Hope Leyba (Colorado); Sydney Watts (Vanderbilt)
