= Ally Perry =

American soccer player (born 2003)

Personal information
- Full name: Allison Marie Perry
- Date of birth: June 13, 2003 (age 23)
- Height: 5 ft 4 in (1.63 m)
- Position: Midfielder

Team information
- Current team: Lexington SC
- Number: 5

Youth career
- Solar SC
- Sting SC
- 2020–2021: Wakeland Wolverines

College career
Years	Team	Apps	(Gls)
2021–2025	Mississippi State Bulldogs	80	(21)

Senior career*
Years	Team	Apps	(Gls)
2026	Juventus	2	(0)
2026–	Lexington SC	1	(0)
- * Club domestic league appearances and goals as of 05:30, August 16, 2026 (UTC)

Allison Marie Perry (born June 13, 2003) is an American professional soccer player who plays as a midfielder for USL Super League club Lexington SC. She played college soccer for the Mississippi State Bulldogs, earning first-team All-American honors in 2025. She began her professional career with Italian club Juventus in 2026.

== Early life ==
Perry grew up in Frisco, Texas, the daughter of Steven and Lisa Perry, and has three siblings. Her father played minor league baseball for the Class A San Jose Bees. Perry played club soccer for Solar SC, winning the ECNL under-14 national title and being named to the tournament Best XI in 2017. She later moved to Sting SC, earning ECNL all-conference honors in 2021. She originally committed to Texas Tech as a freshman, then flipped her commitment to Mississippi State as a senior. She played high school soccer for one season at Wakeland High School, earning United Soccer Coaches high school All-American honors after helping the team to the UIL 5A state final as a senior in 2021.

== College career ==
Perry had 4 assists in 14 games for the Mississippi State Bulldogs as a freshman in 2021, then redshirted most of her sophomore season after suffering a leg injury. She returned to score 2 goals in 20 games primarily as a substitute during her redshirt sophomore season in 2023, helping the Bulldogs to the SEC tournament semifinals and the NCAA tournament third round, both milestones in team history. She had a breakout season as a junior in 2024, starting all 22 games, leading the team with 10 goals, and adding 4 assists, and earned first-team All-SEC honors. Under head coach James Armstrong, the Bulldogs went undefeated in the regular season to win the first SEC regular-season title in team history and again reached the NCAA tournament third round.

Perry then considered signing with Italian club Juventus, but decided return to college for a fifth and final season as team captain in 2025. During the season, she scored in five consecutive games in SEC play, including a late double in an upset of No. 1–ranked Tennessee. She finished the season leading the team with 8 goals and 8 assists in 19 games, returning to the SEC tournament semifinals but losing in the NCAA tournament first round. She earned first-team All-SEC and first-team All-American honors and was named the SEC Midfielder of the Year.

== Club career ==
On January 14, 2026, Juventus announced that the club had signed Perry to her first professional contract on a two-and-a-half-year deal. Two weeks later, she made her professional debut as a 75th-minute substitute in a 2–1 win over Napoli in the second leg of the Coppa Italia quarterfinals. She made 3 appearances for the club in all competitions.

On July 28, 2026, Perry returned to the United States, joining USL Super League champions Lexington SC on a permanent transfer. She made her Super League debut on August 15, 2026, coming on as a second-half substitute for Sarah Griffith in Lexington's season-opening win over Brooklyn FC.

== International career ==
Perry was called into training camp with the United States under-15 team in 2017.

== Career statistics ==
=== Club ===
As of match played 1 February 2026

Appearances and goals by club, season and competition
Club	Season	League			Cups		Continental		Total	
Club	Season	Division	Apps	Goals	Apps	Goals	Apps	Goals	Apps	Goals
Juventus	2025–26	Serie A	1	0	1	0	0	0	2	0
Juventus	Total		1	0	1	0	0	0	2	0
Career total			1	0	1	0	0	0	2	0

== Honors and awards ==
Mississippi State Bulldogs

- Southeastern Conference: 2024

Individual

- First-team All-American: 2025
- First-team All-SEC: 2024, 2025
- SEC Midfielder of the Year: 2025
