= Diving at the 2025 Junior Pan American Games =

Diving at the 2025 Junior American Games
- Venue: Olympic Aquatic Centre
- Start date: August 16, 2025
- End date: August 19, 2025
- No. of events: 10
- Competitors: 60

The diving events at the 2025 Junior Pan American Games were held at the Olympic Aquatic Centre, located in the Olympic Park in Luque, in the Greater Asuncion area. The events were contested between August 16 and 19, 2025.

Ten events were contested, six individual events (three men and three women) and four synchronized (two men and two women). The winner of each event qualified for the 2027 Pan American Games in Lima, Peru.

== Qualification ==
A total of 60 athletes qualified for the events. Qualification was based on the results from the 2025 Pan American Aquatics Championships.

== Medal summary ==
=== Medal table ===
* Host nation (Paraguay)

Rank	Nation	Gold	Silver	Bronze	Total
1	Mexico	4	6	2	12
2	United States	3	2	2	7
3	Canada	2	1	2	5
4	Cuba	1	0	2	3
5	Colombia	0	1	1	2
6	Brazil	0	0	1	1
Totals (6 entries)		10	10	10	30

=== Medalists ===
==== Men ====
Event	Gold	Silver	Bronze
1 metre springboard	Cuba; Frank Rosales	Mexico; David Vázquez Cio	Colombia; Miguel Tovar
3 metre springboard	Mexico; David Vázquez Cio	Mexico; Jesús Agúndez	Canada; Carson Paul
10 metre platform	Mexico; Kenny Zamudio	Canada; Benjamin Tessier	Cuba; Carlos Ramos
Synchronized 3 metre springboard	Mexico; David Vázquez Cio; Jesús Agúndez	Colombia; Tomás Tamayo; Miguel Tovar	United States; Collier Dyer; Luke Hernandez
Synchronized 10 metre platform	Canada; Benjamin Tessier; Matt Cullen	Mexico; Emilio Treviño; Kenny Zamudio	Cuba; Bernaldo Arias; Carlos Ramos

==== Women ====
Event	Gold	Silver	Bronze
1 metre springboard	United States; Sophie Verzyl	Mexico; Mía Cueva	Mexico; Lía Cueva
3 metre springboard	United States; Sophie Verzyl	Mexico; Mía Cueva	Mexico; Lía Cueva
10 metre platform	United States; Ellireese Niday	United States; Hannah McLaughlin	Canada; Katelyn Fung
Synchronized 3 metre springboard	Mexico; Lía Cueva; Mía Cueva	United States; Anna Kwong; Sophie Verzyl	Brazil; Heloá Camelo; Maria Carolina Postiglione
Synchronized 10 metre platform	Canada; Katelyn Fung; Kate Miller	Mexico; Suri Cueva; Maria Sánchez	United States; Ellireese Niday; Hannah McLaughlin

== Results ==
=== Men's 1 metre springboard ===
Rank	Diver	Nationality	Preliminary		Final	
Rank	Diver	Nationality	Points	Rank	Points	Rank
1st place, gold medalist(s)	Frank Rosales	Cuba	344.80	3	384.80	1
2nd place, silver medalist(s)	David Vázquez Cio	Mexico	338.25	5	373.50	2
3rd place, bronze medalist(s)	Miguel Tovar	Colombia	307.80	9	359.75	3
4	Jesús Agundez	Mexico	379.90	1	359.45	4
5	Collier Dyer	United States	353.50	2	347.40	5
6	Jesús Gonzalez	Venezuela	297.90	11	339.75	6
7	Carson Paul	Canada	339.85	4	338.40	7
8	Simon Rios	Colombia	328.20	6	331.65	8
9	Rafael Max	Brazil	320.40	7	328.10	9
10	Luke Hernandez	United States	308.15	8	326.75	10
11	Miguel Cardoso	Brazil	276.05	12	304.80	11
12	Manuel Iglesias	Argentina	301.65	10	294.20	12
13	Cihan Caballero	Cuba	240.55	13	Did not advance	
14	Matías Ortiz	El Salvador	220.40	14	Did not advance	
15	Luis Guaido	Venezuela	218.40	15	Did not advance	
16	Johaquín Cabrera	Paraguay	157.40	16	Did not advance	

=== Men's 3 metre springboard ===
Rank	Diver	Nationality	Preliminary		Final	
Rank	Diver	Nationality	Points	Rank	Points	Rank
1st place, gold medalist(s)	David Vázquez Cio	Mexico	357.35	7	417.65	1
2nd place, silver medalist(s)	Jesús Agundez	Mexico	384.70	2	414.50	2
3rd place, bronze medalist(s)	Carson Paul	Canada	388.05	1	403.75	3
4	Luke Hernandez	United States	361.80	4	388.35	4
5	Collier Dyer	United States	322.30	10	381.65	5
6	Miguel Tovar	Colombia	373.90	3	378.30	6
7	Jesús Gonzalez	Venezuela	358.35	6	361.60	7
8	Juan Travieso	Venezuela	299.10	12	355.65	8
9	Rafael Max	Brazil	360.05	5	354.50	9
10	Frank Rosales	Cuba	331.50	9	349.05	10
11	Tomás Tamayo	Colombia	309.10	11	334.15	11
12	Manuel Iglesias	Argentina	332.70	8	309.80	12
	Gabriel Perdigão	Brazil	282.25	13	Did not advance	
	Cihan Caballero	Cuba	280.60	14	Did not advance	
	Matías Ortiz	El Salvador	239.20	15	Did not advance	
	Johaquín Cabrera	Paraguay	140.75	16	Did not advance	

=== Men's 10 metre platform ===
Rank	Diver	Nationality	Preliminary		Final	
Rank	Diver	Nationality	Points	Rank	Points	Rank
1st place, gold medalist(s)	Kenny Zamudio	Mexico	428.35	3	467.75	1
2nd place, silver medalist(s)	Benjamin Tessier	Canada	379.65	6	463.40	2
3rd place, bronze medalist(s)	Carlos Ramos	Cuba	441.10	1	454.45	3
4	Matt Cullen	Canada	437.15	2	438.40	4
5	Jesús Gonzalez	Venezuela	385.60	5	420.20	5
6	Emilio Treviño	Mexico	406.60	4	382.90	6
7	Grant Cates	United States	294.95	10	376.65	7
8	Bernaldo Arias	Cuba	357.40	7	353.60	8
9	Andrew Bennett	United States	320.85	8	345.85	9
10	Gabriel Perdigão	Brazil	306.45	9	345.85	10
11	Matías Ortiz	El Salvador	240.80	11	228.15	11
	Luis Guaido	Venezuela	RET	12	Did not advance	

=== Men's synchronized 3 metre springboard ===
Rank	Diver	Nationality	Points
1st place, gold medalist(s)	David Vázquez Cio; Jesús Agundez	Mexico	409.29
2nd place, silver medalist(s)	Tomás Tamayo; Miguel Tovar	Colombia	357.84
3rd place, bronze medalist(s)	Collier Dyer; Luke Hernandez	United States	346.29
4	Juan Travieso; Jesús Gonzalez	Venezuela	339.57
5	Rafael Max; Miguel Cardoso	Brazil	330.45
6	Bernaldo Arias; Cihan Caballero	Cuba	299.34

=== Men's synchronized 10 metre platform ===
Rank	Diver	Nationality	Points
1st place, gold medalist(s)	Benjamin Tessier; Matt Cullen	Canada	413.46
2nd place, silver medalist(s)	Kenny Zamudio; Emilio Treviño	Mexico	380.01
3rd place, bronze medalist(s)	Bernaldo Arias; Carlos Ramos	Cuba	350.07
4	Caio Dalmaso; Miguel Cardoso	Brazil	341.13
5	Grant Cates; Andrew Bennett	United States	306.72

=== Women's 1 metre springboard ===
Rank	Diver	Nationality	Preliminary		Final	
Rank	Diver	Nationality	Points	Rank	Points	Rank
1st place, gold medalist(s)	Sophia Verzyl	United States	246.15	1	270.40	1
2nd place, silver medalist(s)	Mía Cueva	Mexico	246.15	1	267.95	2
3rd place, bronze medalist(s)	Lía Cueva	Mexico	187.10	10	261.45	3
4	Anna Kwong	United States	222.35	6	253.20	4
5	Gabriela Rusinque	Colombia	230.95	5	247.95	5
6	Maria Carolina Postiglione	Brazil	222.15	7	231.70	6
7	Amélie-Laura Jasmin	Canada	243.75	3	231.15	7
8	Ana Ricci	Peru	236.25	4	221.10	8
9	Azul Chiorazzo	Argentina	169.50	11	216.90	9
10	Heloá Camelo	Brazil	196.95	9	208.40	10
11	Martha Castañeda	Cuba	212.15	8	195.20	11
12	Piera Rufino	Dominican Republic	158.55	12	126.00	12
13	Melany Zaldivar	Cuba	147.30	13	Did not advance	
14	Alexandra Angueira	Puerto Rico	126.50	14	Did not advance	
15	Jala Wilson	Jamaica	121.10	15	Did not advance	
16	Raysa Segovia	Paraguay	118.20	16	Did not advance	
17	Aura Reyes	Dominican Republic	113.50	17	Did not advance	
18	Karla Alburez	Guatemala	110.00	18	Did not advance	
19	Mia Parini	Paraguay	106.65	19	Did not advance	

=== Women's 3 metre springboard ===
Rank	Diver	Nationality	Preliminary		Final	
Rank	Diver	Nationality	Points	Rank	Points	Rank
1st place, gold medalist(s)	Sophia Verzyl	United States	271.95	2	322.85	1
2nd place, silver medalist(s)	Mía Cueva	Mexico	272.30	1	319.45	2
3rd place, bronze medalist(s)	Lía Cueva	Mexico	205.40	7	292.95	3
4	Amélie-Laura Jasmin	Canada	234.60	5	278.50	4
5	Anna Kwong	United States	248.70	3	241.35	5
6	Gabriela Rusinque	Colombia	195.35	11	227.90	6
7	Ana Ricci	Peru	237.55	4	225.00	7
8	Maria Carolina Postiglione	Brazil	213.15	6	210.75	8
9	Heloá Camelo	Brazil	203.90	8	204.30	9
10	Azul Chiorazzo	Argentina	200.80	10	198.65	10
11	Alexandra Angueira	Puerto Rico	169.50	12	185.85	11
12	Cynthia Cortina	Cuba	202.10	9	173.95	12
13	Martha Castañeda	Cuba	152.40	13	Did not advance	
14	Karla Alburez	Guatemala	135.15	14	Did not advance	
15	Piera Rufino	Dominican Republic	117.90	15	Did not advance	
16	Jala Wilson	Jamaica	117.75	16	Did not advance	
17	Mia Parini	Paraguay	111.05	17	Did not advance	
18	Camila Candia	Paraguay	109.40	18	Did not advance	

=== Women's 10 metre platform ===
Rank	Diver	Nationality	Preliminary		Final	
Rank	Diver	Nationality	Points	Rank	Points	Rank
1st place, gold medalist(s)	Ellireese Niday	United States	338.90	1	260.10	1
2nd place, silver medalist(s)	Hannah McLaughlin	United States	274.25	6	314.40	2
3rd place, bronze medalist(s)	Katelyn Fung	Canada	282.60	5	311.10	3
4	Suri Cueva	Mexico	293.60	3	310.20	4
5	María Sánchez	Mexico	294.20	2	309.20	5
6	Victoria Garza	Dominican Republic	287.70	4	290.90	6
7	Kate Miller	Canada	236.60	8	279.05	7
8	Juliana Giron	Colombia	256.95	7	273.15	8
9	Anais Negret	Cuba	157.00	11	185.05	9
10	Cynthia Cortina	Cuba	163.05	10	181.50	10
11	Heloá Camelo	Brazil	210.70	9	178.55	11

=== Women's synchronized 3 metre springboard ===
Rank	Diver	Nationality	Points
1st place, gold medalist(s)	Lía Cueva; Mía Cueva	Mexico	289.32
2nd place, silver medalist(s)	Sophia Verzyl; Anna Kwong	United States	274.50
3rd place, bronze medalist(s)	Maria Carolina Postiglione; Heloá Camelo	Brazil	222.36
4	Martha Castañeda; Cynthia Cortina	Cuba	217.50
5	Victoria Garza; Piera Rufino	Dominican Republic	197.16
6	Mia Parini; Camila Candia	Paraguay	142.86

=== Women's synchronized 10 metre platform ===
Rank	Diver	Nationality	Points
1st place, gold medalist(s)	Katelyn Fung; Kate Miller	Canada	289.05
2nd place, silver medalist(s)	María Sánchez; Suri Cueva	Mexico	279.48
3rd place, bronze medalist(s)	Ellireese Niday; Hannah McLaughlin	United States	249.63
4	Cynthia Cortina; Anais Negret	Cuba	163.53
