= Yael Averbuch West =

American soccer player and executive (born 1986)

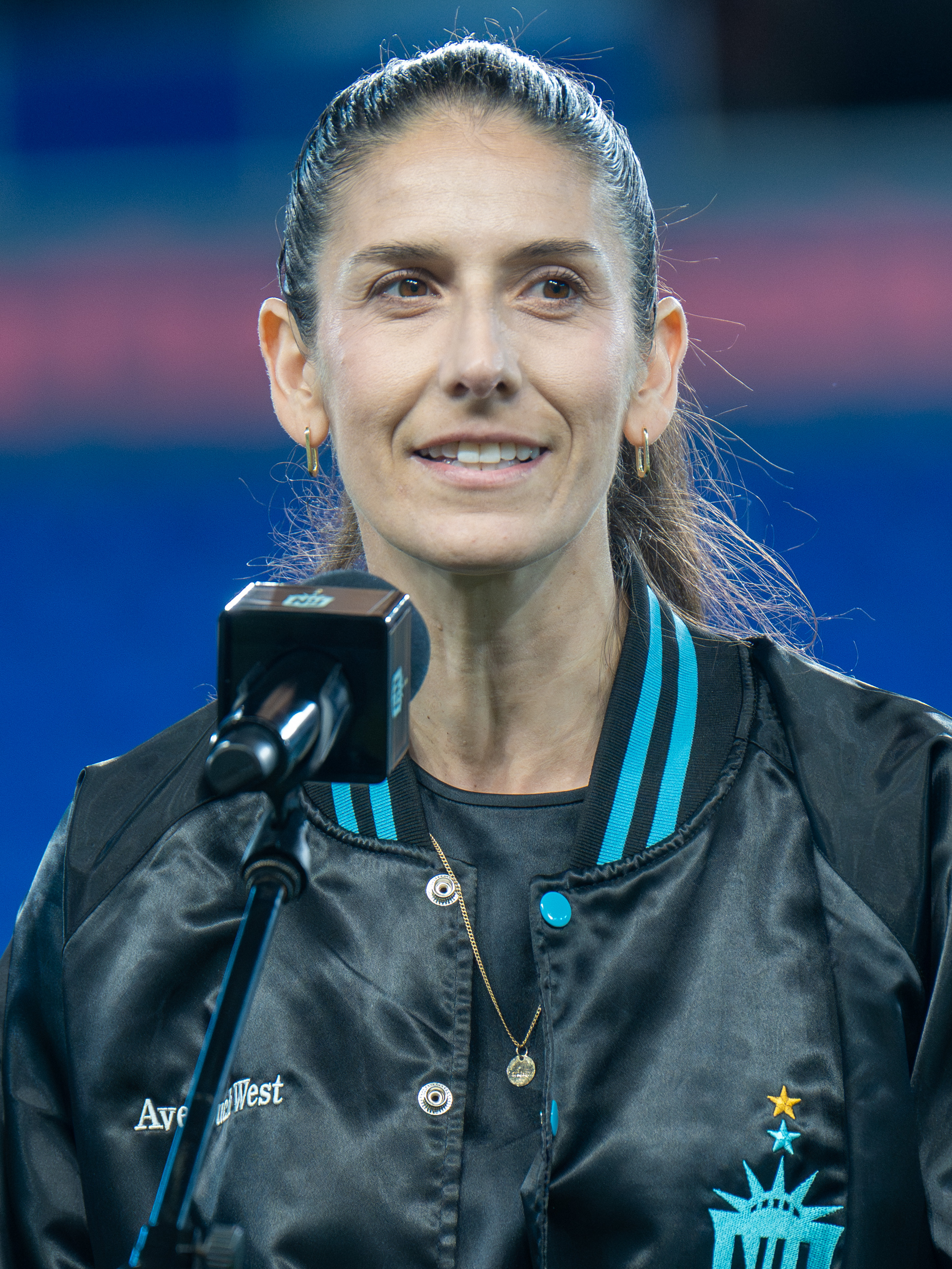
- Averbuch in 2026

Personal information
- Full name: Yael Averbuch West
- Birth name: Yael Friedman Averbuch
- Date of birth: November 3, 1986 (age 40)
- Place of birth: New York, New York, United States
- Height: 5 ft 10 in (1.78 m)
- Positions: Midfielder; defender

Team information
- Current team: Gotham FC (general manager)

Youth career
- Monclair Kangaroos
- Montclair Mavericks
- Ramapo Wildcats

College career
Years	Team	Apps	(Gls)
2005–2008	North Carolina Tar Heels	77	(26)

Senior career*
Years	Team	Apps	(Gls)
2002–2004	New Jersey Lady Stallions	16	(3)
2009–2010	Sky Blue FC	41	(1)
2011	Western New York Flash	13	(0)
2012	WFC Rossiyanka		
2012–2013	Kopparbergs/Göteborg FC	30	(8)
2014	Washington Spirit	22	(1)
2015–2017	FC Kansas City	61	(6)
2018	Seattle Reign FC	1	(0)

International career
2002	United States U-16		
2003	United States U-17		
2003–2004	United States U-19	15	(2)
- United States U-20
- United States U-21
2008	United States U-23		
2007–2013	United States	26	(1)

Managerial career
- 2021: NJ/NY Gotham FC (interim general manager)
- 2021–: Gotham FC (general manager)
- * Club domestic league appearances and goals

Yael Averbuch West (born Yael Friedman Averbuch; November 3, 1986) is an American soccer executive and former professional player who is the general manager of Gotham FC of the National Women's Soccer League (NWSL). She was previously the founding president of the National Women's Soccer League Players Association (NWSLPA).

Averbuch played college soccer for the North Carolina Tar Heels, winning two national championships and earning first-team All-American honors twice. She was picked third overall by Sky Blue FC (later known as Gotham FC) in the 2009 WPS Draft and won WPS championships with Sky Blue and the Western New York Flash. After the WPS folded, she made a brief stint with WFC Rossiyanka and played for Kopparbergs/Göteborg FC. In 2014, she was allocated to the NWSL's Washington Spirit, then signed with FC Kansas City and won the NWSL Championship in her debut season in 2015. She retired with the Seattle Reign in 2018. Internationally, she played for the United States at every youth level and represented the senior national team from 2007 to 2013, earning 26 caps and scoring 1 goal.

Averbuch helped create the NWSLPA in 2017 and was president until 2019. She was named general manager of Gotham FC in 2021. Under her leadership, the club won the 2023 and 2025 NWSL Championships.

== Early life ==
Yael Averbuch, who is Jewish, was born in New York City. She is the daughter of Gloria Averbuch and Paul Friedman. Her middle name Friedman is her father's last name and her last name Averbuch is her mother's maiden name. Yael is a common Hebrew name taken from the biblical book of Judges. Yael killed the enemy general Sisera. The word Yael can also be translated as ibex, mountain goat, or as the verb "to go up".

Averbuch grew up in Montclair, New Jersey, where she attended Montclair High School, graduating in 2005. Yael attained High Honor Roll status all four years in high school. She did not play high school soccer, concentrating on club soccer instead. She was named an NSCAA All-American and USYSA All-American as a sophomore, junior and senior. As a junior and senior, she was named Parade All-American.

=== University of North Carolina ===
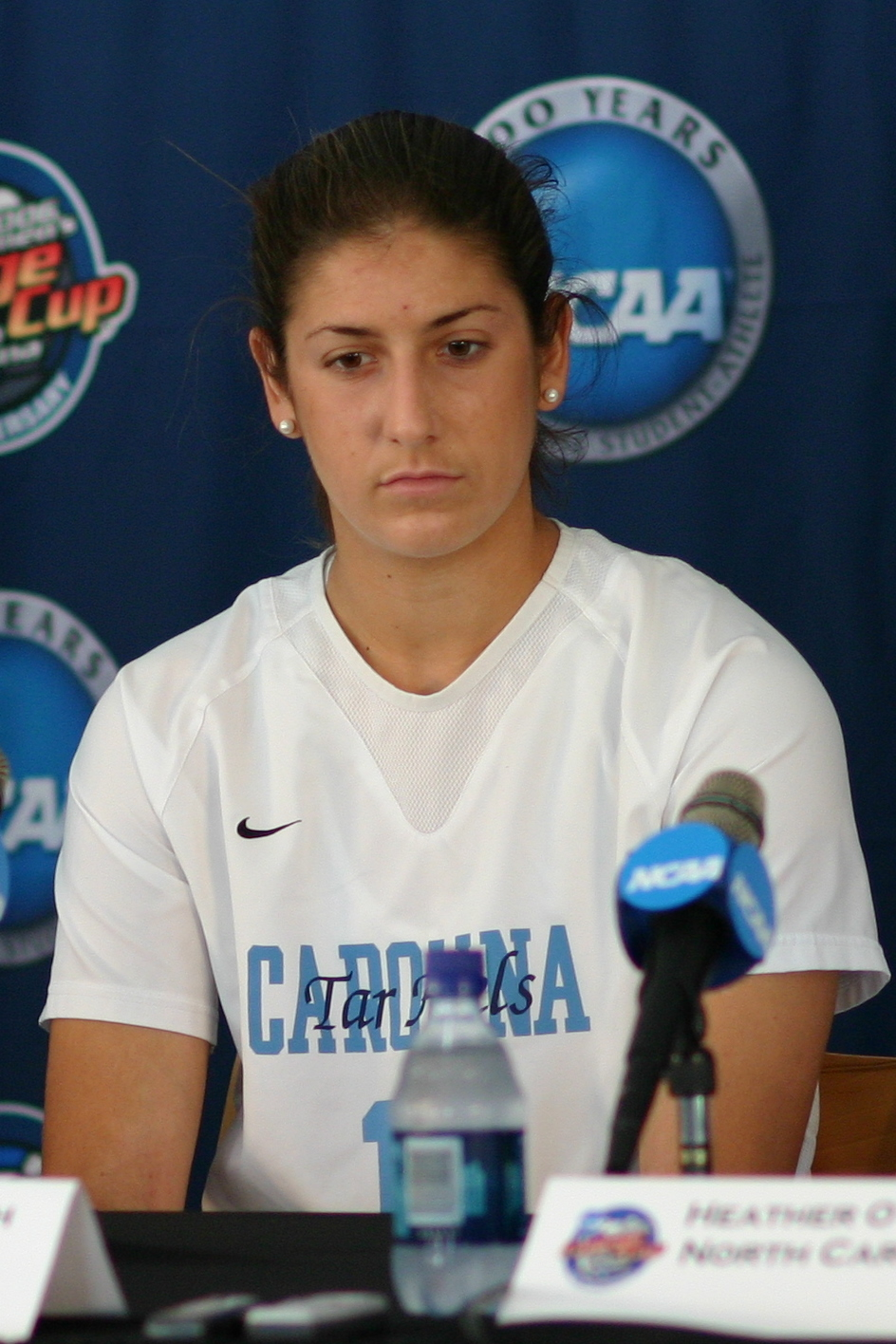
Averbuch as a Tar Heel

During her career as a center midfielder at the University of North Carolina at Chapel Hill, Averbuch set a record starting 105 consecutive games. She was a two-time captain and was selected first-team All-Performer the Atlantic Coast Conference, one of the most competitive conferences in the country. She helped the Tar Heels win two NCAA Women's College Cup titles in 2006 and 2008. In 2006 and 2007, she earned NSCAA All-America first team status. In 2008, she was named to the NSCAA All-America second team and earned NSCAA Scholar-Athlete of the Year and NCAA VIII Award honors.

As a freshman in 2005, Averbuch started all 25 games. She scored three of her four goals off direct kicks as the team's free kick and corner kick specialist. She was named to the Soccer America and Soccer Buzz first-team freshman All-America teams after notching seven assists and four goals in her first season with the Tar Heels. She was also named the Soccer Buzz Southeast Region Freshman of the Year and was tapped for the All-Southeast Region Second Team and Southeast Region All-Freshman Team. Averbuch was recognized by the ACC as an Academic All-Conference player and as a member of ACC All-Freshmen Team. She was named to the Duke adidas Classic All-Tournament Team as well as the 2005–06 ACC Honor Roll.

In 2006, Averbuch was Carolina's second-leading scorer with 39 points and led the team in game-winning goals with seven. She was named national player of the year by both Soccer Buzz and Top Drawer Soccer and was a finalist for both the Missouri Athletic Club Hermann Trophy and the Honda Soccer Award. She set an NCAA record for fastest goal scored in a game when she scored four seconds into the match at Yale on the direct kick at midfield to start the game. Averbuch assisted on both goals against UCLA in the NCAA semifinals and was named the ACC's Offensive Player of the Year, Soccer Buzz's Southeast Region player of the year, first-team All-ACC, and All-ACC Academic for a second straight year. She was also named to ESPN The Magazine's women's soccer third-team Academic All-America.

During her junior year in 2007, Averbuch appeared in and started every game for the Tar Heels. She was fourth on the team with 18 points, collected six goals and six assists for the season, and led the team in shots taken with 88. She was named to the ESPN The Magazine/College Sports Information Directors of America Academic All-District Team and was a second-team ESPN The Magazine All-America selection. She was named ACC's Scholar-Athlete of the Year for women's soccer and was an All-ACC Academic Team selection, first-team All-ACC and All-ACC Tournament selection. She was also a finalist for Soccer Buzz Player of the Year and a MAC Hermann Trophy semifinalist. She made three first-team All-America Teams as named by the NSCAA coaches, Soccer America and Soccer Buzz and was an Umbro/Soccer News Net Player of the Year Award finalist. Averbuch was also a Soccer Buzz and NSCAA first-team All-Southeast Region selection as well as Jewish Sports Review All America.

== Club career ==
=== New Jersey Lady Stallions ===
Averbuch played for the New Jersey Lady Stallions in the W-League from 2002 to 2004. At just 14 years of age, she became the youngest player at that time to appear in the W-League.

=== Sky Blue FC ===
Averbuch was selected in the first round of the 2009 WPS Draft (4th overall) by her home state team, Sky Blue FC. During the 2009 season, she started 14 of 18 games and assisted Keeley Dowling's game-winning goal in the WPS Semifinal against the Saint Louis Athletica. The team went on to beat the Los Angeles Sol 1–0 to clinch the 2009 WPS Championship.

In 2010, Averbuch returned to Sky Blue, playing in 23 games, starting 19 and scoring one goal.

=== Western New York Flash ===
In 2011, Averbuch signed with the Western New York Flash. She made 14 appearances with eight starts, playing a total of 751 minutes, helping her team win the 2011 WPS Championship in penalties by scoring the winning penalty kick against the Philadelphia Independence.

=== WFC Rossiyanka ===
After the end of the 2011 WPS season and suspension of the league, Averbuch headed to Moscow, Russia for a month to join WFC Rossiyanka for the quarterfinal of the UEFA Champions League. She, along with Kia McNeill and Leigh Ann Robinson, were brought in by the coach to help strengthen the team as it prepared to face Germany's 1. FFC Turbine Potsdam in the UEFA Women's Champions League. Averbuch made two appearances for the team.

=== Kopparbergs/Göteborg FC ===
In 2012, Averbuch signed with Kopparbergs/Göteborg FC in Sweden. She made 16 appearances and scored 7 goals across all competitions for Göteborg in 2012. Kopparbergs/Göteborg FC won the 2012 Svenska Cupen by defeating Tyresö FF. Averbuch returned to Göteborg in 2013, where she won the 2013 Svenska Supercupen.

=== Washington Spirit, 2014 ===
Averbuch was acquired by the Washington Spirit in the National Women's Soccer League ahead of the 2014 NWSL season, she was an allocated player by U.S. Soccer. She appeared in 23 games for Washington as they qualified for the NWSL playoffs for the first time.

==== Loan to Apollon ====
Averbuch went on loan to Apollon following the 2014 NWSL season.

=== FC Kansas City, 2015–2017 ===
Averbuch became a free agent in the NWSL after losing her allocation following the 2014 season. On November 7, 2014, she signed with FC Kansas City. Averbuch made 20 appearances for the club and scored 2 goals. FC Kansas City won the NWSL championship in 2015.

She returned to FCKC for the 2016 NWSL season, she scored 3 goals in 20 games, but FC Kansas City finished in 6th place a failed to qualify for the play-offs.

In 2017, Averbuch played in 23 games and scored 1 goal, FCKC missed the playoffs for the second straight season. After the 2017 NWSL season concluded FC Kansas City ceased operations. Utah Royals FC entered the league and all FCKC player contracts were transferred over to the new franchise. At the 2018 NWSL College Draft Averbuch was traded to the Seattle Reign in exchange for Diana Matheson, reuniting her with former FC Kansas City head coach Vlatko Andonovski.

Averbuch was instrumental in the creation of the National Women's Soccer League Players Association in May 2017. She served as president and the NWSLPA was officially recognized as the exclusive bargaining representative of NWSL Players in November 2018.

=== Seattle Reign, 2018 ===
Averbuch was only able to play in one game for the Reign in 2018 as she battled ulcerative colitis. She announced prior to the 2019 NWSL season that she was suspending her playing career due to this illness. Averbuch would remain involved with the NWSLPA as she was named executive director for 2019.

== International career ==
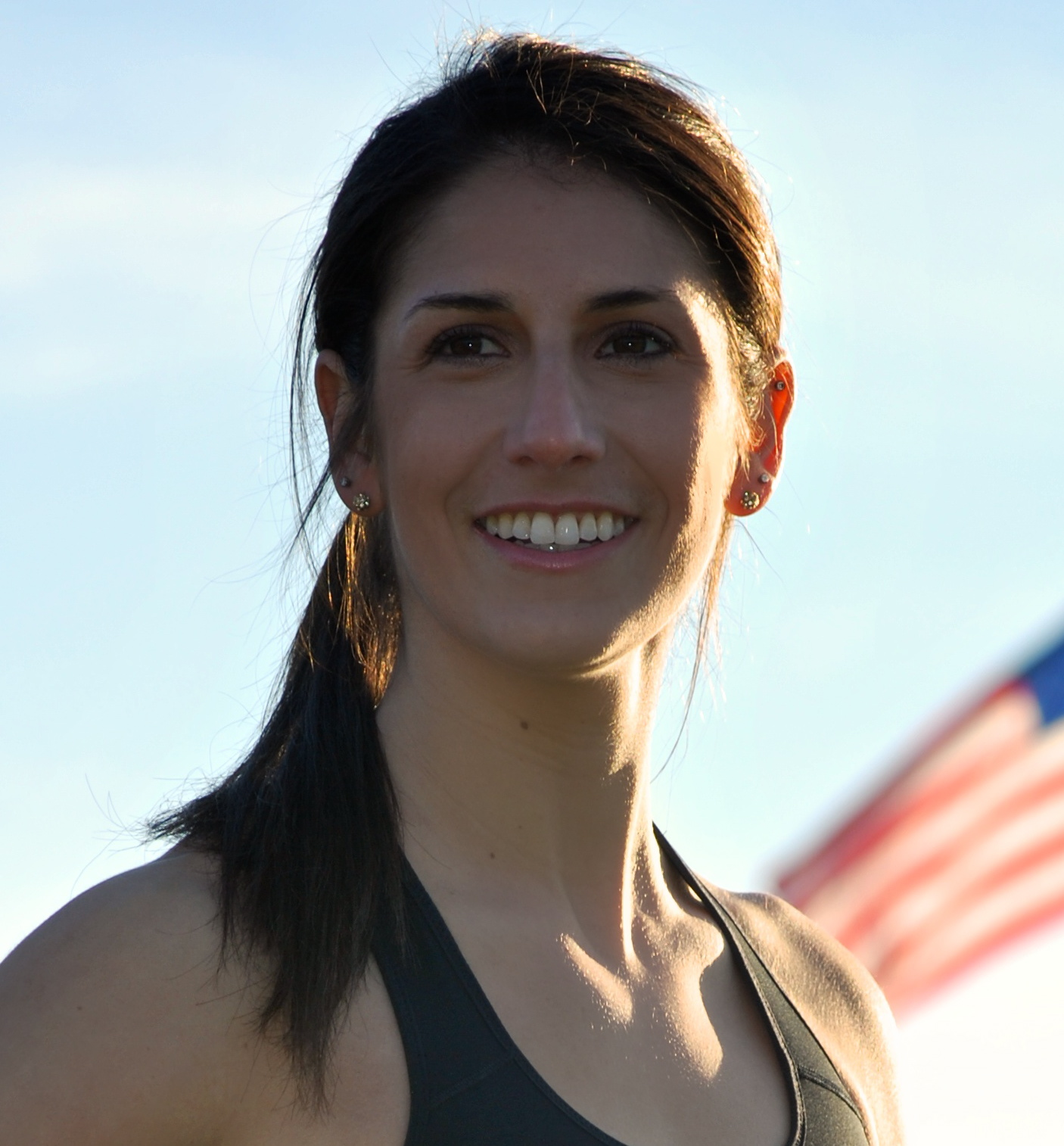
Averbuch in 2013

Averbuch played for the United States at every level of the youth national teams, starting with the U-16 women's national team in 2002 and U-17 team in 2003 before joining the U-19 team later in 2003. She finished her U-19 career with 15 caps and two goals and was a member of the U.S. team that finished third at the 2004 FIFA U-19 Women's World Cup in Thailand, where she played in two matches. She played for the U.S. U-23s in 2008, captaining the team to a Nordic Cup title in Sweden.

Averbuch earned her first two senior team caps in 2007, coming off the bench in two matches at the Four Nations Tournament in China, playing against England (on January 28, 2007) and China. In 2009, she was called upon to start at outside midfield against Germany in the USA's 1–0 victory in October in Augsburg, her only match of the year. In 2010, she played in 10 matches while starting five and scoring one goal.

Averbuch's first goal for the United States women's national soccer team occurred during a 2010 CONCACAF Women's Gold Cup qualifier against Costa Rica on November 1, 2010, in Cancun, Mexico. She played in three matches during the Women's World Cup qualifying matches, starting two.

== Managerial career ==
=== NJ/NY Gotham FC, 2021– ===
Following the firing of general manager Alyse LaHue on July 9, 2021, NJ/NY Gotham FC of the National Women's Soccer League named Averbuch as the club's interim general manager on August 3, 2021. On December 7, 2021, Gotham FC made her appointment permanent. Averbuch has since overseen the tenure of coach Scott Parkinson, starting with his hiring on August 31, 2021, and the mutual termination of his contract on August 11, 2022.

== Journalism career ==
Averbuch has written for The New York Times and Our Game Magazine. She now writes her own blog.

== Personal life ==
Averbuch's hometown is Montclair, New Jersey. Her younger sister, Shira, was a midfielder for Stanford University and represented the Team USA in July 2013 in the 19th Maccabiah Games in Israel and is a current employee of Soccer United Marketing.

In 2016 Averbuch founded Techne Futbol, a soccer training app which provides a personal training program for soccer players.

On April 27, 2019, Averbuch married former Davidson College midfielder, Aaron West, in a ceremony in North Carolina. Their daughter, Aria Adrienne West, was born on September 29, 2020.

== Career statistics ==
=== Club ===
Appearances and goals by club, season and competition
Club	Season	League			Cup (Note: Includes Svenska Cupen)		Playoffs (Note: Includes WPS playoffs and NWSL playoffs)		Total	
Club	Season	Division	Apps	Goals	Apps	Goals	Apps	Goals	Apps	Goals
Sky Blue FC	2009	WPS	18	0	—		3	0	21	0
Sky Blue FC	2010	WPS	23	1	—		—		23	1
Western New York Flash	2011	WPS	13	0	—		1	0	14	0
Kopparbergs/Göteborg FC	2012	Damallsvenskan	10	6	2	0	—		12	6
Kopparbergs/Göteborg FC	2013	Damallsvenskan	20	2	2	2	—		22	4
Washington Spirit	2014	NWSL	22	1	—		1	0	23	1
FC Kansas City	2015	NWSL	18	2	—		2	0	20	2
FC Kansas City	2016	NWSL	20	3	—		—		20	3
FC Kansas City	2017	NWSL	23	1	—		—		23	1
Seattle Reign FC	2018	NWSL	1	0	—		0	0	1	0
Career total			168	16	4	2	7	0	179	18

=== International ===
Appearances and goals by national team and year
National team	Year	Apps	Goals
United States	2007	2	0
United States	2008	–	–
United States	2009	1	0
United States	2010	10	1
United States	2011	3	0
United States	2012	–	–
United States	2013	10	0
Total		26	1

Scores and results list the United States' goal tally first, score column indicates score after each Averbuch West goal.

List of international goals scored by Yael Averbuch West
No.	Date	Venue	Opponent	Score	Result	Competition	Ref.
1	November 1, 2010	Estadio Andrés Quintana Roo, Cancún, Mexico	Costa Rica	3–0	4–0	2010 CONCACAF Women's Gold Cup	

== Honors and awards ==
- Set an NCAA record for the fastest goal scored in a game when she scored four seconds into the match at Yale in 2006 on a shot taken directly after the kickoff touch. (video)
- Averbuch, who is Jewish, was named a first-team All-American on the Jewish Sports Review's 2006 Women's College Division I All-America Soccer Team.
- She was also honored in the National Jewish Sports Hall of Fame and Museum on April 29, 2007.
- ACC (Atlantic Coast Conference) Scholar-Athlete of the Year for women's soccer, 2007 & 2008.
- Was one of three finalists for the MAC Hermann Trophy award in 2006 for top college player in the country.
- Received the NCAA VIII award, given to 8 seniors nationwide for athletic/academic/community achievements.
- Retired her UNC college jersey number in Spring, 2009.

University of North Carolina

- NCAA Division I Women's Soccer Championship: 2006, 2008

Sky Blue FC

- WPS Championship: 2009

Western New York Flash

- WPS Championship: 2011

Kopparbergs/Göteborg FC

- Svenska Cupen: 2012
- Svenska Supercupen: 2013

FC Kansas City

- NWSL Championship: 2015

United States

- Algarve Cup: 2010, 2011, 2013

== See also ==
- List of select Jewish football (association; soccer) players
- All-time Sky Blue FC roster
- List of recipients of Today's Top 10 Award
- Fastest goals in association football
- List of University of North Carolina at Chapel Hill alumni
