= Dennis Tankersley =

American baseball player (born 1979)

- Pitcher
- Born: February 24, 1979 (age 47); Troy, Missouri, U.S.
- Batted: Right Threw: Right

MLB debut
- May 10, 2002, for the San Diego Padres

Last MLB appearance
- September 4, 2004, for the San Diego Padres

MLB statistics
- Win–loss record: 1–10
- Earned run average: 7.61
- Strikeouts: 68
- Stats at Baseball Reference

Teams
- San Diego Padres (2002–2004)

Dennis Lee Tankersley (born February 24, 1979) is an American former Major League Baseball pitcher. From 2002 through 2004, Tankersley played for the San Diego Padres. He batted and threw right-handed.

== Career ==
Tankersley was drafted by the Boston Red Sox in the 38th round of the 1997 Major League Baseball draft, but did not sign. The following year, he was drafted by the Red Sox, yet again in the 38th round, and this time he did sign. In June 2000, he was traded along with Cesar Saba to the Padres for Ed Sprague. Before the 2005 season, the Kansas City Royals acquired Tankersley and outfielder Terrence Long from the San Diego Padres in exchange for pitchers Darrell May and Ryan Bukvich.

On December 16, 2006, the Detroit Tigers signed him to a minor league deal. On November 27, 2007, Tankersley signed a minor league contract with the Washington Nationals that included an invitation to spring training. He became a free agent at the end of the season, and announced his retirement from baseball in 2008. He decided to come out of retirement in 2012 and attempt a comeback with the Padres.

Tankersley was a 2001 All-Star Futures Game selection.

In a three-season career, Tankersley compiled a 1–10 record with 68 strikeouts and a 7.61 ERA in 86.1 innings.

== Personal life ==
Tankersley's daughter, Ava, played college soccer for the Arkansas Razorbacks.
