= Mía Cueva =

Mexican diver (born 2011)

Personal information
- Full name: Mía Zazil Cueva Lobato
- Nationality: Mexican
- Born: 21 January 2011 (age 15)

Sport
- Country: Mexico
- Sport: Diving
- Event: 3 m synchro
- Coached by: Iván Bautista
Medal record
Women's diving
Representing Mexico
World Championships
Bronze medal – third place	2025 Singapore	3 m synchro
Junior Pan American Games
Gold medal – first place	2025 Asunción	3 m synchro
Silver medal – second place	2025 Asunción	1 m springboard
Silver medal – second place	2025 Asunción	3 m springboard

Mía Zazil Cueva Lobato (born 21 January 2011) is a Mexican diver.

== Career ==
Cueva began her career practicing gymnastics, before switching to swimming and diving at 11 years old. She made her World Aquatics Championships debut in 2025 and won a bronze medal in the 3 metre synchro event, along with her twin sister, Lía Cueva. At 14 years old, they are the youngest divers to medal at the World Aquatics Championships. She also competed in the 1 metre springboard event and finished in seventh place with a score of 260.05. She then competed at the 2025 Junior Pan American Games in diving and won a gold medal in the 3 metre synchro, along with her sister, and silver medals in the 1 metre and 3 metre springboard events.

== Personal life ==
Cueva's twin sister, Lía, and older sister, Suri, are also divers.
