= Ashley Orkus =

American soccer player (born 1998)

Personal information
- Full name: Ashley Brown Orkus
- Date of birth: October 9, 1998 (age 28)
- Place of birth: Marietta, Georgia, United States
- Height: 5 ft 11 in (1.80 m)
- Position: Goalkeeper

Team information
- Current team: Fram

College career
Years	Team	Apps	(Gls)
2017	Tennessee Volunteers	4	(0)
2018–2022	Ole Miss Rebels	79	(1)

Senior career*
Years	Team	Apps	(Gls)
2023	FHL		
2024–2025	Tampa Bay Sun	21	(0)
2025–	Fram	0	(0)
- * Club domestic league appearances and goals as of August 29, 2025

Ashley Brown Orkus (born October 9, 1998) is an American professional soccer player who plays as a goalkeeper for Icelandic Besta deild kvenna club Knattspyrnufélagið Fram. She played college soccer for the Ole Miss Rebels, being named the Southeastern Conference (SEC) Goalkeeper of the Year three times and first-team All-American in 2021.

== Early life and college career ==
Orkus was born in Marietta, Georgia, and grew up in Vestavia Hills, Alabama. Both of her parents attended the University of Georgia. Orkus began playing soccer as a forward but switched to goalkeeper at age eight when her club team ran out of substitutes in a game. She played club soccer for the Birmingham United Soccer Association and the Concorde Fire. She received call-ups to train with the United States youth national team at the under-15 and under-17 level in 2013 and the under-18s in 2014 and 2016. She graduated from Vestavia Hills High School.

=== Ole Miss Rebels ===
Following one season as Shae Yanez's backup for the Tennessee Volunteers in 2017, Orkus transferred to the Ole Miss Rebels but had to sit out her sophomore season due to NCAA transfer rules. She became the starting keeper for the Rebels in the 2019 season, posting a career-high 90 saves that ranked second in the Southeastern Conference. The following season, she led the SEC with 85 saves as a redshirt junior in 2020. She helped lead Ole Miss to the third round of the NCAA tournament, saving seven penalty kicks in two shootout wins over Bowling Green and USC and saving one penalty kick in overtime against the latter. She was named the SEC goalkeeper of the year, first-team All-SEC, third-team United Soccer Coaches All-American, and first-team TopDrawerSoccer Best XI.

Orkus made 76 saves in her redshirt senior season in 2021, helping Ole Miss reach a career-high 11 wins. She repeated as SEC goalkeeper of the year and first-team All-SEC, and she became the first Rebel to be named first-team All-American and first listed as a semifinalist for the Hermann Trophy. In her final season in 2022, she made 67 saves and kept a career-high 10 clean sheets. She was once again SEC goalkeeper of the year (the only multi-time recipient) and first-team All-SEC. She scored the only goal of her college career that year off a free kick in a 2–1 win over Kentucky. By the end of the season, she held Ole Miss program records for career saves (318) and clean sheets (25).

== Club career ==
=== FHL ===
Following her college graduation, Orkus was drafted by National Women's Soccer League club Kansas City Current as the 47th overall pick in the fourth round of the 2023 NWSL Draft; she was one of eight players, and the second goalkeeper, selected by the Current that night. She trained with the team in the preseason but was waived before the season began. On April 4, 2023, Orkus signed with Icelandic club Fjardabyggd/Höttur/Leiknir of the second-tier 1. deild kvenna. Despite her club placing only one spot safe of relegation in the 2023 season, she performed well and was named FHL's most valuable player of the season.

=== Tampa Bay Sun ===
USL Super League club Tampa Bay Sun FC announced they signed Orkus on June 14, 2024, ahead of the league's inaugural 2024–25 season. Orkus impressed in the Sun's first-ever game on August 18, making six saves in a 1–1 draw to Dallas Trinity FC. She saved a penalty kick in the closing minutes of the next week's scoreless draw to DC Power FC. For her performance, she was named the league's inaugural Player of the Month for August.

=== Fram ===
On August 29, 2025, Orkus joined Fram on a move that required an exemption from FIFA. The signing came after the transfer window closed and was necessitated by injuries to the other goalkeepers rostered by Fram.

== Style of play ==
Orkus cites Petr Čech, Manuel Neuer, Joe Hart, and Kailen Sheridan as inspirations.

== Honors ==
Tampa Bay Sun

- USL Super League: 2024–25

USL Super League

- Player of the Month: August 2024
