= Anna Podojil =

American soccer player (born 2000)

Personal information
- Full name: Anna Maryn Podojil
- Date of birth: September 12, 2000 (age 26)
- Height: 5 ft 6 in (1.68 m)
- Position: Forward

Youth career
- Cincinnati United
- 2015–2018: Indian Hill Braves
- 2017–2019: Ohio Elite

College career
Years	Team	Apps	(Gls)
2019–2023	Arkansas Razorbacks	102	(50)

International career
2019	United States U-20	2	(0)

Anna Maryn Podojil (born September 12, 2000) is an American former soccer player and sprinter. She played college soccer for the Arkansas Razorbacks, earning first-team All-American honors and setting a program record with 50 career goals. She was drafted by the Washington Spirit in the third round of the 2024 NWSL Draft but instead spent one season with the Arkansas track and field team.

== Early life ==
Podojil was born in Cincinnati, Ohio, but lived for several years in Bentonville, Arkansas, before moving back to Cincinnati in fifth grade. She played multiple sports growing up, including soccer and track. She played club soccer for Cincinnati United Premier, where she won the USYS under-17 national title in 2017, and Ohio Elite Soccer Academy. In her junior year at Indian Hill High School in 2017, she scored 38 goals and helped the team to an undefeated record and its first Division II state title, scoring in the final. After recovering from an off-season anterior cruciate ligament injury, she scored 28 goals and led the team to defend its state title as a senior in 2018. She set a school record with 117 career goals, earned first-team all-state honors three times, made All-American teams twice, and was named Ohio Ms. Soccer and the Ohio Gatorade Player of the Year twice.

Podojil also ran track in high school, winning the 200 meter state title as a sophomore in 2017 and the 400 meter and 4 × 400 meter relay state titles as a senior in 2019, setting a state record in the latter with her sister. She received scholarship offers in track only after she had as a sophomore committed to play college soccer at the University of Arkansas. She was ranked by TopDrawerSoccer as the No. 37 prospect of the 2019 class. She was inducted into the Indian Hill Athletic Hall of Fame in 2026.

== College career ==
=== Soccer ===
Podojil started all 23 games and scored 14 goals with 7 assists in her freshman season in 2019. She helped the Arkansas Razorbacks win the first of three consecutive Southeastern Conference (SEC) regular-season titles. In the SEC tournament, she scored twice in the semifinals against Florida, sending Arkansas to its fourth of six consecutive SEC title games, all of which the team would lose. Podojil was named first-team All-SEC (after ranking second in the conference in goals), became the first Razorback to win SEC Freshman of the Year, and was one of the program's first two United Soccer Coaches All-American selections, picking up third-team honors with Haley VanFossen. TopDrawerSoccer named her the fifth-best freshman in the country.

Podojil scored 7 goals and provided a career-high 10 assists in 16 games in her sophomore season in 2020. She led the SEC in assists and became the first SEC Forward of the Year and the first USC first-team All-American in program history. In her junior season in 2021, she led the SEC in scoring with 16 goals and added 6 assists in 21 games. She helped Arkansas earn a two seed in the NCAA tournament and make its first appearance in the Elite Eight. She had three goals in four games at the tournament but had a penalty saved in the shootout loss to Rutgers. She was ranked by TopDrawerSoccer as the fourth-best and ninth-best player in the country after her sophomore and junior seasons respectively.

Podojil was named first-team All-SEC for the fourth consecutive year, and received third-team USC All-American honors, after scoring 8 goals and making 6 assists in 22 games in her senior season in 2023. On senior night, she tied Julie Williford's program record with her 44th career goal. Although the Razorbacks lost their SEC tournament opener, the team made its second consecutive trip to the NCAA tournament Elite Eight. She used an extra year of eligibility, granted by the NCAA due to the COVID-19 pandemic, to play a fifth season in 2023. She scored 5 goals with 6 assists in 20 games, earning second-team All-SEC honors. Arkansas again won the SEC regular-season title and reached the SEC tournament title game, but Podojil suffered an anterior cruciate ligament injury in the final loss, ending her college soccer career. She had 50 goals and 35 assists in 102 appearances (all starts).

=== Track and field ===
After five seasons at Arkansas, Podojil was drafted by the Washington Spirit in the third round (35th overall) of the 2024 NWSL Draft. She did not report to the Spirit's preseason because of her knee injury. She went through recovery in Arkansas and afterwards decided to return to her track and field roots with Arkansas's nationally ranked team, although she did not rule out pursuing professional soccer in the future. She had spoken with the track head coach about joining the team earlier, but the pandemic moving part of her sophomore soccer season to the spring made it not work out. She ran the 600 meters in 1:26.95 in her college debut, the ninth-best time in the event in college history. She later helped set the college record in the 4 × 800 meter relay (8:16.12), running 2:05.5 in her leg. She primarily competed in the 800 meters, recording a best time of 2:02.12 at the SEC indoor championship finals, good for fourth place.

== International career ==
Podojil was called into training camps with the United States under-18 team in 2017. She played in two friendlies for the under-20 team against France and Brazil in 2019.

== Personal life ==
Podojil is the oldest of three children born to Dan and Rebecca Podojil. Her parents were track and field athletes at Miami University in Ohio, both in hurdling and her father also in decathlon. Her younger sister, Elle, played soccer with her at Arkansas for four years, and her younger brother, John, runs track at Miami. Following her college track season, she opted not to pursue professional soccer and went into nursing.

== Honors and awards ==
Arkansas Razorbacks

- Southeastern Conference: 2019, 2020, 2021, 2023
- SEC tournament runner-up: 2019, 2020, 2021, 2023

Individual

- First-team All-American: 2020
- Second-team All-American: 2019, 2022
- First-team All-SEC: 2019, 2020, 2021, 2022
- Second-team All-SEC: 2023
- SEC Forward of the Year: 2020
- SEC Freshman of the Year: 2019
- SEC tournament all-tournament team: 2019, 2020
