= Hannah McLaughlin =

American soccer player (born 2003)

Personal information
- Full name: Hannah Ellen McLaughlin
- Date of birth: 2003 (age 22–23)
- Position: Center back

Team information
- Current team: Grindavík/Njarðvík
- Number: 12

Youth career
- NASA Tophat

College career
Years	Team	Apps	(Gls)
2022–2025	Vanderbilt Commodores	82	(5)

Senior career*
Years	Team	Apps	(Gls)
2026–	Grindavík/Njarðvík	22	(2)
- * Club domestic league appearances and goals as of October 23, 2026

Hannah Ellen McLaughlin (born 2003) is an American professional soccer player who plays as a center back for Icelandic club Grindavík/Njarðvík of the Besta deild kvenna. She played college soccer for the Vanderbilt Commodores, earning first-team All-American honors in 2025.

== Early life ==
McLaughlin grew up in Cumming, Georgia. Growing up playing midfielder, she played club soccer for NASA Tophat in the Girls Academy, serving as team captain for four years. She committed to Vanderbilt before her junior year. She transferred to Denmark High School in Alpharetta, Georgia, for her senior year, joining her sister on the soccer team. That season in 2022, she scored a school record 39 goals, led the team to a 19–1 record and the GHSA 7A state quarterfinals, and was named the Region 6 7A Player of the Year.

== College career ==
McLaughlin played in all 21 games, starting 15, as a defensive midfielder for the Vanderbilt Commodores in her freshman year in 2022. She also scored 3 goals and was named to the Southeastern Conference (SEC) all-freshman team. She moved to center back as a sophomore in 2023, starting all 18 games, scoring 2 goals, and earning second-team All-SEC honors. In her junior year in 2024, she was named first-team All-SEC and started 19 games, missing two games in which her sister started in her place. Vanderbilt reached the NCAA tournament third round for the first time after eliminating defending champions Florida State on penalties, though McLaughlin had hers saved. She started all 24 games beside her sister in her senior year in 2025, allowing just 14 goals over the season. She helped the Commodores win their fourth SEC tournament title, defeating LSU on penalties in the final, though hers was saved. Vanderbilt then recorded NCAA tournament milestones as the team earned a one seed and reached the quarterfinals. McLaughlin was named first-team All-SEC and first-team All-American alongside teammate Sydney Watts.

== Club career ==
On January 14, 2026, it was announced that McLaughlin had signed her first professional contract with newly promoted Icelandic club Grindavík/Njarðvík. She made her professional debut on February 14, playing the full match in a 5–1 league cup win over FHL. Later that month, she scored her first professional goal in a 1–0 win over FH in the same competition. On July 25, she opened the scoring from long range in a 3–0 win over Fram in the national cup semifinals, leading Grindavík to their first cup final (which they lost 2–1 to Þróttur). She ended her debut season with 30 appearances and 6 goals in all competitions as Grindavík placed fifth in the league.

== Personal life ==
McLaughlin has three siblings including a younger sister, Mary Beth, who played with her at Vanderbilt for two seasons. Her father played football and baseball at Furman University, and her mother played basketball at Bethany College in West Virginia and later competed in triathlons.

== Honors and awards ==
Vanderbilt Commodores

- Southeastern Conference tournament: 2025

Individual

- First-team All-American: 2025
- First-team All-SEC: 2024, 2025
- Second-team All-SEC: 2023
- SEC all-freshman team: 2022
