= Bárbara Olivieri =

Venezuelan footballer (born 2002)

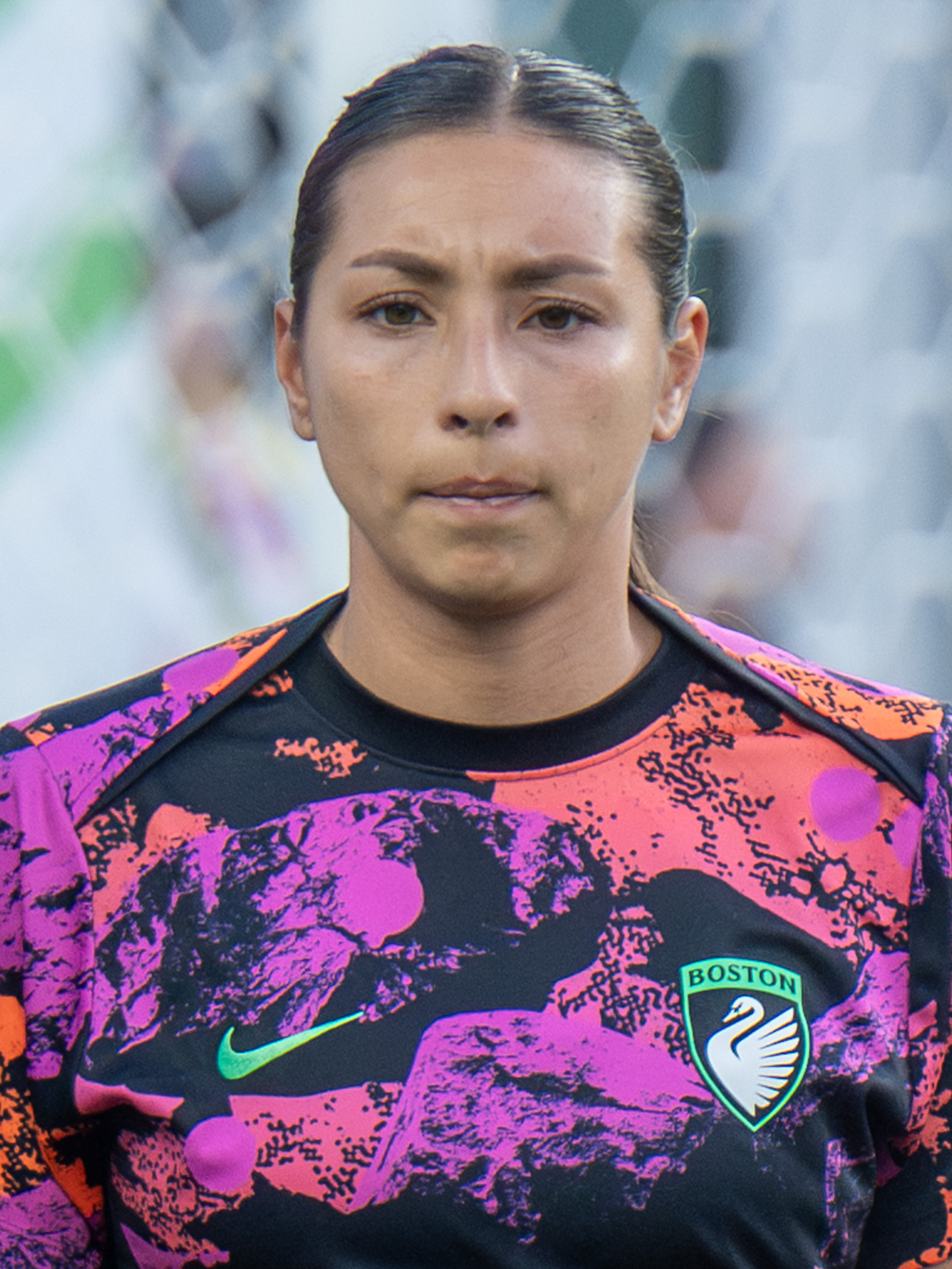
- Olivieri with the Boston Legacy in 2026

Personal information
- Full name: Bárbara Klarissa Olivieri Dávila
- Date of birth: 24 February 2002 (age 24)
- Place of birth: Katy, Texas, U.S.
- Height: 1.68 m (5 ft 6 in)
- Positions: Attacking midfielder; forward

Team information
- Current team: Boston Legacy
- Number: 21

Youth career
- 2013-2020: Albion Hurricanes
- 2017-2019: Tompkins High School

College career
Years	Team	Apps	(Gls)
2020–2021	Texas A&M Aggies	26	(13)

Senior career*
Years	Team	Apps	(Gls)
2022–2023	Monterrey	27	(3)
2023–2025	Houston Dash	44	(6)
2026–	Boston Legacy	29	(1)
2025	→ Tigres UANL (loan)	14	(1)

International career^{‡}
2018	Venezuela U17	6	(4)
2020–2022	Venezuela U20	8	(5)
2021–	Venezuela	27	(3)
- * Club domestic league appearances and goals as of 02:16, 8 November 2026 (UTC) ‡ National team caps and goals as of 00:32, 30 October 2024 (UTC)

Bárbara Klarissa Olivieri Dávila (born 24 February 2002) is a professional footballer who plays as an attacking midfielder or forward for Boston Legacy FC of the National Women's Soccer League (NWSL). Born and raised in the United States to Venezuelan parents, she plays for the Venezuela national team.

Olivieri played college soccer for the Texas A&M Aggies and was named the SEC Freshman of the Year in 2020. After two years at Texas A&M, she began her professional career with Liga MX Femenil club Monterrey. In 2023, she joined the Houston Dash in the NWSL, before moving to Boston Legacy FC following a Liga MX Femenil–winning loan with Tigres UANL.

== Early life ==
Olivieri was born and raised in Katy, Texas, United States to Venezuelan parents. She played multiple sports as a child and especially soccer, starting at age 3. In 2014, Olivieri's parents took her to a Houston Dash game that exposed her to women's professional soccer. She attended Tompkins High School where her teams reached the Texas state championship final in 2017 and 2019.

== College career ==
Olivieri attended Texas A&M University in College Station, Texas. In 2020 she was named SEC Freshman of the Year, and she was named to all-SEC teams for both the 2020 and 2021 seasons. Following her sophomore season and a stunning international debut, Olivieri left the college game to pursue a professional career.

== Club career ==
=== Monterrey ===
Olivieri signed with Monterrey in Mexico in early February 2022. While with the club, the Rayadas finished the Clausura 2022 regular season at the top of the table, but lost in the playoff semi-final. Monterrey was second in the Apertura 2022 regular season and again lost in the playoff semi-final.

=== Houston Dash ===
In February 2023, the Houston Dash signed Olivieri on a one-year contract with an option for 2024.

=== Boston Legacy ===
On 22 August 2025, Boston Legacy FC acquired Olivieri from the Dash in exchange for $100,000 in transfer funds and signed her to a long-term deal through 2029. Olivieri would then join Mexican club Tigres UANL before returning to Boston ahead of its inaugural NWSL season in 2026. She became the first Venezuelan player to win a Liga MX championship after helping Tigres win the 2025 Apertura title.

On 15 July 2026, Olivieri scored her first goal for the Legacy in a 1–0 win over the Orlando Pride, the club's first-ever road victory.

== International career ==
Olivieri represented Venezuela at the 2018 South American U-17 Championship, the 2020 South American U-20 Championship, and the 2022 South American U-20 Championship.

At the senior level, Olivieri made her debut on 1 December 2021, in a 2–1 friendly win over India. She scored the game-winning goal and assisted the other goal.

=== International goals ===
Scores and results list Venezuela's goal tally first

No.	Date	Venue	Opponent	Score	Result	Competition
1.	14 April 2026	Estadio Metropolitano de Cabudare, Cabudare, Venezuela	Argentina	1–2	1–2	2025–26 CONMEBOL Women's Nations League
2.	18 April 2026	Estadio Metropolitano de Cabudare, Cabudare, Venezuela	Bolivia	3–0	8–0	2025–26 CONMEBOL Women's Nations League

== Honors ==
Tigres UANL

- Liga MX Femenil: Apertura 2025

Individual

- First-team All-SEC: 2020
- Second-team All-SEC: 2021
- SEC Freshman of the Year: 2020
