= Ava Tankersley =

American soccer player (born 2002)

Personal information
- Full name: Ava Grace Tankersley
- Date of birth: June 5, 2002 (age 24)
- Place of birth: Saint Peters, Missouri
- Height: 5 ft 11 in (1.80 m)
- Position: Forward

Youth career
- St. Louis Scott Gallagher
- Fort Zumwalt South Bulldogs

College career
Years	Team	Apps	(Gls)
2020–2024	Arkansas Razorbacks	102	(38)

Senior career*
Years	Team	Apps	(Gls)
2025	Tampa Bay Sun	13	(2)
- * Club domestic league appearances and goals

Ava Grace Tankersley (born June 5, 2002) is an American former professional soccer player. She played college soccer for the Arkansas Razorbacks, earning first-team All-American honors and being named the SEC Forward of the Year twice. She played professionally for USL Super League club Tampa Bay Sun and was part of their inaugural championship squad.

== Early life ==
Tankersley grew up in St. Peters, Missouri. She is the daughter of Dennis Tankersley, a former Major League Baseball (MLB) pitcher for the San Diego Padres. She attended Fort Zumwalt South High School, where she was named first-team all-state in her senior season. She played ECNL club soccer for St. Louis Scott Gallagher SC.

== College career ==
In her freshman season with the Arkansas Razorbacks in 2020, Tankersley scored 4 goals with 3 assists in 16 games, including the winning assist in the semifinals of the SEC tournament, and was named to the SEC all-freshman team. She did not regularly start in her sophomore season, when she recorded 5 goals and 6 assists in 21 appearances. Arkansas again made the SEC tournament final and reached the quarterfinals of the NCAA tournament. In her junior season in 2022, Tankersley grew into one of the team's leaders, starting all 22 games, scoring 9 goals, and leading the team with 12 assists as she was selected to the All-SEC second team. She scored twice during Arkansas's run to the NCAA tournament quarterfinals.

In her senior season in 2023, Tankersley led the SEC with 7 goals in conference play as Arkansas won the SEC regular-season title for the fourth time in five years. She was named the SEC Forward of the Year and first-team All-SEC. She finished the season with 8 goals and 5 assists as Arkansas made the SEC tournament final but only the second round of the NCAA tournament. Tankersley chose to return for her fifth season of eligibility, granted by the NCAA due to the COVID-19 pandemic. In her graduate season, she scored a career-high 12 goals with 9 assists as Arkansas finished second in the SEC behind Mississippi State. She was named first-team All-American and repeated as first-team All-SEC and SEC Forward of the Year. In the NCAA tournament, she was one of two Arkansas players whose penalty attempts were saved by the opposing goalkeeper in a shootout loss in the third round. During her years in Fayetteville, head coach Colby Hale played Tankersley throughout the front line at winger, attacking midfielder, and striker. She left the program tied for second in career assists (32) and fourth in goals (38).

== Club career ==
Tankersley joined the Kansas City Current as a non-roster trialist in the 2025 preseason, but didn't make the roster. On February 17, she signed her first professional contract with USL Super League club Tampa Bay Sun, joining former Razorbacks teammate Parker Goins. She made her professional debut five days later as a substitute for Goins in a 1–1 draw with Brooklyn FC. On April 5, she scored her first professional goal to conclude a 2–0 win over Fort Lauderdale United. Tampa Bay finished the inaugural season as USL Super League champions. On August 24, she made her first professional start in the 2025–26 season opener, being replaced by Jilly Shimkin at halftime in a 2–1 loss to Brooklyn FC. She played in 13 games and scored 2 goals over the course of the year. She announced her retirement from soccer on January 22, 2026.

== Honors and awards ==
Arkansas Razorbacks

- Southeastern Conference: 2020, 2021, 2023

Tampa Bay Sun

- USL Super League: 2024–25

Individual

- First-team All-American: 2024
- First-team All-SEC: 2023, 2024
- Second-team All-SEC: 2022
- SEC Forward of the Year: 2023, 2024
- SEC all-freshman team: 2020
