= Ken McDonald (soccer) =

American soccer player

Personal information
- Date of birth: September 26, 1957 (age 69)
- Place of birth: Philadelphia, U.S.
- Position: Defender

College career
Years	Team	Apps	(Gls)
1975–1978	Penn State Nittany Lions		

Senior career*
Years	Team	Apps	(Gls)
1979	San Jose Earthquakes	1	(0)
1979	Tulsa Roughnecks	0	(0)
1980–1981	Pennsylvania Stoners		
1981–1982	Denver Avalanche (indoor)	7	(2)
1983–1985	St. Louis Steamers (indoor)	42	(5)

Managerial career
- 1989–1998: Vanderbilt Commodores
- * Club domestic league appearances and goals

Ken McDonald (born September 26, 1957) is an American retired soccer forward who played in the North American Soccer League, Major Indoor Soccer League and American Soccer League. Ken has a twin sister Maryanne. He married with wife Annie Louise McDonald after they met at Penn State. They have 3 children and his eldest son Ryan is following in his father's footsteps coaching.

McDonald played for the Penn State Nittany Lions men's soccer team from 1975 to 1978. In 1979, McDonald played for both the San Jose Earthquakes and Tulsa Roughnecks of the North American Soccer League. In 1980, he moved to the Pennsylvania Stoners of the American Soccer League where he was a 1981 First Team All Star. In the fall of 1981, he signed with the Denver Avalanche of the Major Indoor Soccer League. In 1983, he joined the St. Louis Steamers where he played two seasons before being released in July 1985.

He coached Vanderbilt Commodores women's soccer.
