= Sydney Watts =

American soccer player (born 2005)

Personal information
- Date of birth: February 16, 2005 (age 21)
- Place of birth: California, United States
- Height: 5 ft 9 in (1.75 m)
- Position: Striker

Team information
- Current team: Vanderbilt Commodores
- Number: 15

Youth career
- KC Fusion
- Sporting Blue Valley

College career
Years	Team	Apps	(Gls)
2023–	Vanderbilt Commodores	77	(40)

Senior career*
Years	Team	Apps	(Gls)
2023	Kansas City Current II	–	(–)
- * Club domestic league appearances and goals

Sydney Watts (born February 16, 2005) is an American college soccer player who plays as a striker for the Vanderbilt Commodores. She earned first-team All-American honors in 2025.

== Early life ==
Watts was born in California and raised in Lenexa, Kansas. She began playing soccer at age two or three and was coached by her father. She developed as a central midfielder before switching to striker. She attended Saint Thomas Aquinas High School in Overland Park, Kansas, where she played soccer and basketball. She led the soccer team to three consecutive Class 5A state championships and was twice named the Class 5A Player of the Year and the Kansas Gatorade Player of the Year. She committed to Vanderbilt during her junior year. She played club soccer for KC Fusion and Sporting Blue Valley, where she earned ECNL all-conference honors. Before college, she also played in the summer for the Kansas City Current II in the Women's Premier Soccer League (WPSL). TopDrawerSoccer ranked her as a top-30 recruit in the 2023 class.

== College career ==
Watts played 15 games as a substitute for the Vanderbilt Commodores, while dealing with an ankle injury, in her freshman year in 2023. She was healthy and became a starter as a sophomore in 2024, leading the Commodores with 9 goals in 21 games and earning third-team All-SEC honors. In the NCAA tournament, she scored twice in the opening round and converted a penalty in the upset shootout win over defending champions Florida State as Vanderbilt reached the third round for the first time. She had a breakout junior season in 2025, leading the SEC with 16 goals in 24 games, and was named first-team All-American, first-team All-SEC, and the SEC Forward of the Year. She helped lead Vanderbilt to their fourth SEC tournament title, scoring both goals in the semifinal game against Georgia and making her penalty in the final shootout win over LSU. In the NCAA tournament, she scored two goals as the one seed Commodores reached the quarterfinals for the first time.

== International career ==
Watts was called into training camp with the United States under-20 team in April 2023.

== Personal life ==
Watts is the daughter of Wendy and Rian Watts. Her parents both played college sports at Baker University, with her mother in soccer, basketball, and track, and her father in soccer. Her older sister, Lexi, played college soccer for Kansas.

== Honors and awards ==
Vanderbilt Commodores

- Southeastern Conference tournament: 2025
- Southeastern Conference: 2026

Individual

- First-team All-American: 2025
- First-team All-SEC: 2025, 2026
- Third-team All-SEC: 2024
- SEC Forward of the Year: 2025, 2026
- SEC tournament all-tournament team: 2025
