= James Armstrong (soccer, born 1979) =

English soccer coach (born 1979)

Personal information
- Date of birth: March 20, 1979 (age 47)
- Place of birth: Yorkshire, England

Team information
- Current team: Auburn Tigers (head coach)

Managerial career
- Years: Team
- 2013–2018: Auburn Tigers (Asst./assoc. head coach)
- 2019–2024: Mississippi State Bulldogs
- 2025–: Auburn Tigers

James Armstrong (born March 20, 1979) is an English college soccer coach who is the head coach of the Auburn Tigers women's soccer team. He previously coached the Mississippi State Bulldogs, where he is the winningest head coach in program history. In 2024, he was named Southeastern Conference (SEC) Coach of the Year at Mississippi State.

== Career ==
Raised in the small English village of Embsay, Armstrong grew up in a soccer family supporting Manchester United. He attended the University of Edinburgh and studied abroad at the University of North Carolina at Chapel Hill for one year. After college, he began working for the United States Soccer Federation as the equipment manager for the national women's under-19 team. He later spent a decade working for Lonestar SC, a youth club based in Austin, Texas.

Armstrong joined the college coaching ranks when he was hired as an assistant on Karen Hoppa's Auburn Tigers coaching staff in 2013.

Armstrong was the head coach of the Mississippi State Bulldogs from 2019 to 2024, compiling an overall record of 62–35–18, which makes him the winningest coach in program history. In his final season in Starkville, he led Mississippi State to go 10–0 in conference play to claim the first Southeastern Conference (SEC) regular-season title in program history, which led him to be named SEC Coach of the Year.

Armstrong returned to Auburn in 2025, succeeding Hoppa after her retirement.
