= Erin Baxter =

American former soccer player

Personal information
- Full name: Erin Renee McCorkle
- Birth name: Erin Renee Baxter
- Date of birth: August 9, 1977 (age 49)
- Place of birth: Littleton, Colorado, United States
- Height: 5 ft 8 in (1.73 m)
- Positions: Centre back; defensive midfielder

College career
Years	Team	Apps	(Gls)
1995–1998	Florida Gators	85	(26)

Senior career*
Years	Team	Apps	(Gls)
1998–2000	Tampa Bay Extreme		
2001–2003	Carolina Courage	55	(2)
2004	Carolina Dynamo	4	(1)
- * Club domestic league appearances and goals

Erin Renee McCorkle (née Baxter; born August 9, 1977) is an American former professional soccer player. A combative defensive midfielder, she played for Carolina Courage of Women's United Soccer Association (WUSA).

Baxter played college soccer for the University of Florida "Gators". She was inducted to the University of Florida Athletic Hall of Fame in April 2009.

Baxter was the Carolina Courage's fourth draft pick ahead of the inaugural 2001 season of the Women's United Soccer Association (WUSA). Described as a "tireless blue-collar worker", versatile Baxter featured as one of the best defensive midfielder in 2001 before switching to central defense in the Courage's 2002 WUSA Founders Cup-winning campaign. When starting midfielder Hege Riise suffered a knee injury early in 2003, Baxter was moved back into midfield.

In April 2004, Baxter signed for Carolina Dynamo. She made four appearances and scored one goal for the club in the 2004 USL W-League season.

Following the demise of WUSA, Baxter retrained as an accountant and began working for Ernst & Young in her native Littleton, Colorado. In 2009 she was living with husband John, with whom she has two daughters, Kylie Grace and Sydney Harper.
