= Keeley Dowling =

American soccer defender

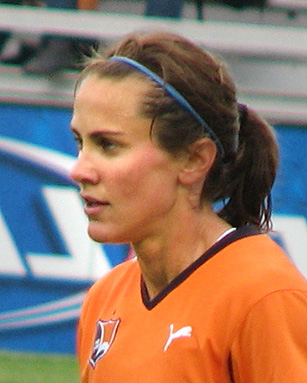

Personal information
- Full name: Keeley Kathleen Dowling
- Date of birth: February 17, 1983 (age 43)
- Place of birth: Carmel, Indiana, United States
- Height: 5 ft 7 in (1.70 m)
- Position: Defender

College career
Years	Team	Apps	(Gls)
2001–2004	Tennessee Lady Volunteers		

Senior career*
Years	Team	Apps	(Gls)
2005	Charlotte Lady Eagles	14	(0)
2006–2007	KIF Örebro DFF		
2009–2010	Sky Blue FC	39	(0)
2011	Atlanta Beat	11	(0)

International career
- United States U-19
- United States U-21

Managerial career
- 2005–2006: Tennessee Lady Volunteers (student assistant)
- 2007: Tennessee Lady Volunteers (interim assistant)
- 2008–2011: Tennessee Lady Volunteers (assistant)
- 2012–2020: Texas Longhorns (assistant)
- 2021–: Colorado State Rams
- * Club domestic league appearances and goals

Keeley Kathleen Dowling (born February 17, 1983) is an American soccer defender, who is currently the head women's soccer coach at Colorado State University.

== Early life ==
Born and raised in Carmel, Indiana, Dowling attended Carmel High School where she captained the soccer team to the state championship as a senior. She was named the 2000 Indiana Player of the Year the same year. Dowling earned Parade All-American honors and was named Hamilton County and Metro Player of the Year. She was named to the 2000 NSCAA/adidas High School All-America team and to the organization's Youth All-America unit. Dowling set her school's all-time assist record and was an all-state selection in 1999 and 2000.

Dowling also played for the club team, Carmel Cosmos, and helped them win the state championship multiple times. The team was the national runner-up in 2000.

=== University of Tennessee ===
Dowling attended the University of Tennessee where she played for the Lady Vols from 2001 to 2004. She earned three consecutive All-America selections during her playing career at Tennessee and helped lead the Lady Vols to their first Sweet 16 in 2002. During her career, the Lady Vols compiled a 63–22–6 overall record.

Dowling was twice named Central Regional Player of the Year in 2003 and 2004 and earned back-to-back SEC Defensive Player of the Year awards the same years. She was a four-time All-SEC selection and two-time National Player of the Year semifinalist. Dowling also earned All-American honors (a first for the school's program).

During her collegiate career, Dowling scored 25 goals and served 15 assists for 65 points. She started all 89 games in which she played. She was added to the school's top 10 lists for career matches played, matches started, points and goals.

== Playing career ==
=== Club ===
==== Sky Blue FC ====
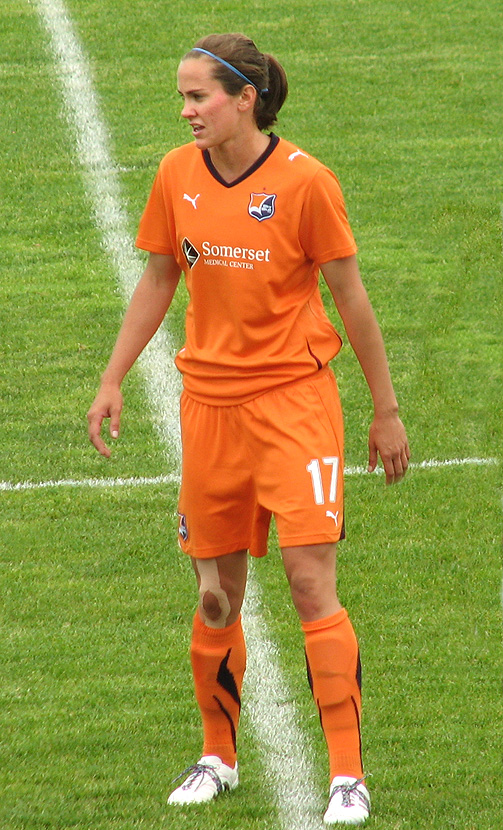
Dowling playing for Sky Blue FC, 2010.

In October 2008, Dowling was the eighth overall pick of the WPS Allocation Draft by Sky Blue FC. After earning a starting spot as a defender, Dowling helped Sky Blue win the 2009 WPS championship title with her game-winning goal during a 1–0 semifinal 1–0 victory over the St. Louis Athletica. She later joined her team at the White House in the summer of 2010 when the team was honored by President Barack Obama.

During the 2009 season, Dowling played in 22 games, starting 21. She returned to the squad in 2010 and appeared in 20 games with 18 starts.

==== Atlanta Beat ====
Dowling signed with the Atlanta Beat for the 2011 season. Towards the end of the season, she tore the anterior cruciate ligament in her right knee when she landed awkwardly after attempting to play a long ball downfield during a match against the Boston Breakers. The injury required season-ending surgery. Dowling ended the season prematurely with 11 starts in 11 games played.

=== International ===
Dowling represented the United States on the under-19 women's national soccer team and captained the gold-winning team to the first-ever FIFA U-19 Women's World Championship. Two years later, she helped the United States under-21 team win gold at the Nordic Cup. She was called up for training camps for the senior national team in preparation for the 2007 Algarve Cup in Portugal in 2007 and 2008 Olympics, but did not make the final rosters.

== Coaching career ==
Dowling began her coaching career as a student assistant at Tennessee in 2005. In 2007, she was elevated to interim assistant coach, and in 2008, the interim tag was removed. When then-head coach Ange Kelly was hired by Texas in 2011, Dowling joined her as an assistant coach.

On June 1, 2021, Dowling was named the second-ever head coach at Colorado State.
