= 2026 NWSL rookie class =

First-year pros in US soccer

Overview
- League: National Women's Soccer League

The rookie class for the 2026 season of the National Women's Soccer League (NWSL) is the second since the abolition of the NWSL Draft. Instead of being selected in a draft, first-year professionals are able to sign with teams as free agents. In December 2025, the league held the first NWSL Combines for both youth players and college and post-college players.

== List ==
=== Key ===
^{+}	Denotes player who has been selected as NWSL Most Valuable Player
^{*}	Denotes player who has been selected for an NWSL Best XI or NWSL Second XI team
^{^}	Denotes player who has been selected as NWSL Rookie of the Year
^{#}	Denotes player who has never appeared in a competitive NWSL game (regular season, playoff, or Challenge Cup)

=== Players ===
As of November 8, 2026

Date	Nat.	Player	Pos.	NWSL team	School	Ref.
Dec 3, 2025	(United States)	Sophia Lowenberg	MF	Boston Legacy FC	Boston College	
Dec 9, 2025	(Israel)	Talia Sommer	MF	Gotham FC	Butler	
Dec 10, 2025	(Nigeria)	Chioma Okafor	FW	North Carolina Courage	UConn	
Dec 16, 2025	(United States)	Kolo Suliafu	DF	Kansas City Current	Washington	
Dec 19, 2025	(United States)	Laney Rouse	DF	Kansas City Current	Virginia	
Dec 22, 2025	(United States)	Meila Brewer^{#}	DF	Kansas City Current	UCLA	
Dec 23, 2025	(United States)	Heather Gilchrist	DF	Bay FC	Florida State	
Dec 26, 2025	(United States)	Gianna Paul	FW	Kansas City Current	Alabama	
Dec 29, 2025	(Jamaica)	Mimi Van Zanten	DF	San Diego Wave FC	Florida State	
Dec 29, 2025	(United States)	Shae Harvey	MF	Portland Thorns FC	Stanford	
Dec 30, 2025	(United States)	Lia Godfrey	MF	San Diego Wave FC	Virginia	
Jan 6, 2026	(United States)	Amelia White	FW	Kansas City Current	Penn State	
Jan 7, 2026	(United States)	Taylor White	FW	Racing Louisville FC	West Virginia	
Jan 7, 2026	(United States)	Karsyn Cherry	DF	Angel City FC	Louisville	
Jan 7, 2026	(United States)	Kat Rader	FW	Houston Dash	Duke	
Jan 7, 2026	(United States)	Carina Lageyre	MF	Angel City FC	Duke	
Jan 8, 2026	(United States)	Andrea Kitahata	FW	Gotham FC	Stanford	
Jan 8, 2026	(United States)	Taylor Suarez	MF	Angel City FC	Florida State	
Jan 8, 2026	(United States)	Jasmine Aikey^{#}	FW	Denver Summit FC	Stanford	
Jan 8, 2026	(United States)	Maddie Padelski	FW	Portland Thorns FC	Alabama	
Jan 8, 2026	(United States)	Leah Klenke	DF	Houston Dash	Notre Dame	
Jan 9, 2026	(United States)	Sara Wojdelko^{#}	GK	Washington Spirit	Vanderbilt	
Jan 9, 2026	(United States)	Mirann Gacioch	DF	Racing Louisville FC	Ohio State	
Jan 10, 2026	(United States)	Yuna McCormack	MF	Denver Summit FC	Florida State	
Jan 13, 2026	(United States)	Linda Ullmark	MF	Houston Dash	North Carolina	
Jan 14, 2026	(United States)	Molly Pritchard^{#}	GK	North Carolina Courage	Ohio State	
Jan 14, 2026	(United States)	Kate Faasse	FW	Houston Dash	North Carolina	
Jan 14, 2026	(United States)	Faith Nguyen^{#}	GK	Angel City FC	Texas Tech	
Jan 16, 2026	(United States)	Teagan Wy^{#}	GK	Gotham FC	California	
Jan 16, 2026	(United States)	Macy Blackburn	DF	Racing Louisville FC	Texas Tech	
Jan 16, 2026	(United States)	Elise Evans	DF	Chicago Stars FC	Stanford	
Jan 16, 2026	(United States)	Natalie Means	DF	Denver Summit FC	Georgetown	
Jan 16, 2026	(United States)	Maja Lardner	FW	Racing Louisville FC	Georgetown	
Jan 16, 2026	(United States)	Evan O'Steen^{#}	GK	Seattle Reign FC	Florida State	
Jan 16, 2026	(United States)	Seven Castain	FW	Orlando Pride	TCU	
Jan 16, 2026	(United States)	Cara Martin^{#}	GK	Orlando Pride	Georgetown	
Jan 16, 2026	(United States)	Jordan Nytes^{#}	GK	Denver Summit FC	Colorado	
Jan 17, 2026	(United States)	Tessa Dellarose	MF	Chicago Stars FC	North Carolina	
Jan 17, 2026	(United States)	Devin Lynch	MF	Denver Summit FC	Duke	
Jan 17, 2026	(United States)	Faith Webber^{#}	FW	Denver Summit FC	Utah Valley	
Jan 19, 2026	(United States)	Emma Egizii	MF	Chicago Stars FC	UCLA	
Jan 19, 2026	(Jamaica)	Solai Washington	FW	Orlando Pride	Florida State	
Jan 20, 2026	(United States)	Olivia Thomas	FW	Denver Summit FC	North Carolina	
Jan 22, 2026	(United States)	Carolyn Calzada	DF	Portland Thorns FC	Notre Dame	
Jan 26, 2026	(United States)	Jordynn Dudley	FW	Gotham FC	Florida State	
Jan 27, 2026	(United States)	Molly Skurcenski^{#}	MF	Washington Spirit	Texas Tech	
Feb 5, 2026	(Jamaica)	Kameron Simmonds	DF	Utah Royals	Florida State	
Feb 25, 2026	(United States)	Rajanah Reed^{#}	FW	Angel City FC	UCF	
Mar 4, 2026	(United States)	Tatum Wynalda	MF	San Diego Wave FC	Pepperdine	
Mar 5, 2026	(United States)	Reagan Raabe	FW	Orlando Pride	Nebraska	
Mar 5, 2026	(United States)	Cate Hardin	DF	Houston Dash	Georgia	
Mar 10, 2026	(United States)	Kalea Eichenberger	FW	Utah Royals	Washington	
Mar 10, 2026	(United States)	Camryn Miller^{#}	GK	Bay FC	Cincinnati	
Mar 10, 2026	(Puerto Rico)	Ivy Younce	DF	North Carolina Courage	Liberty	
Mar 11, 2026	(United States)	Natalie Mitchell^{#}	MF	Racing Louisville FC	Virginia Tech	
Mar 12, 2026	(United States)	Jennie Immethun	DF	Portland Thorns FC	UCLA	
Mar 12, 2026	(United States)	Renee Lyles	MF	Portland Thorns FC	Clemson	
Mar 12, 2026	(United States)	Ruby Hladek	FW	Seattle Reign FC	Utah Valley	
Mar 19, 2026	(United States)	Taylor Rath^{#}	GK	Chicago Stars FC	Utah State	
Mar 20, 2026	(United States)	Keeley Dockter^{#}	DF	Seattle Reign FC	Portland	
Mar 21, 2026	(United States)	Kelsey Branson	MF	Kansas City Current	Washington	
Mar 27, 2026	(United States)	Erynn Floyd^{#}	GK	Racing Louisville FC	Louisville	
Apr 10, 2026	(United States)	Natalie Bain	DF	Houston Dash	Xavier	
Jul 31, 2026	(United States)	Itala Gemelli	DF	Kansas City Current	Alabama	
Aug 4, 2026	(United States)	Ali Swensen^{#}	DF	Utah Royals	Utah	
Oct 8, 2026	(United States)	Avery Clark^{#}	FW	Kansas City Current	Texas	
Nov 5, 2026	(United States)	Maddie DiMaria	FW	Angel City FC	Cor Jesu Academy	

== See also ==
- NWSL Draft
- 2026 National Women's Soccer League season
