= 2026 San Diego Wave FC season =

San Diego Wave FC 2026 soccer season

San Diego Wave FC
2026 season
- Owner: Arthur Levine; Lauren Leichtman
- General manager: Camille Ashton
- Head coach: Jonas Eidevall
- Stadium: Snapdragon Stadium
- NWSL: 2nd
- NWSL Playoffs: Quarterfinals
- Top goalscorer: Trinity Byars (11)
- Highest home attendance: 15,881 (Jul 11 vs. LA)
- Lowest home attendance: 8,428 (Mar 25 vs. POR)
- Average home league attendance: 12,284
- Biggest win: 2–0 (7 matches, NWSL)
- Biggest defeat: 0–2 (3 matches, NWSL)
Home colors	Away colors
- All statistics correct as of November 6, 2026.

The 2026 San Diego Wave FC season was the team's fifth season as a professional women's soccer team. Based in San Diego, California, United States, San Diego Wave FC plays in the National Women's Soccer League (NWSL), the top tier of women's soccer in the United States.

== Background ==
In 2025, the Wave navigated through its first season with new head coach Jonas Eidevall at the helm. The club finished the regular season in sixth place, qualifying for the postseason for the third time in history. In the first round of the 2025 NWSL playoffs, San Diego lost in extra time to Portland Thorns FC after Reilyn Turner scored a goal in the 94th minute. Following the conclusion of the NWSL season, the Wave participated in the World Sevens Football tournament, finishing as champions and winning a prize of $2 million.

=== Offseason changes ===
Multiple players departed from San Diego during the offseason. Leading goalscorer Delphine Cascarino moved to the London City Lionesses in a mission to return closer to her family. Starting goalkeeper Kailen Sheridan left the Wave in December 2025, leaving Kristen McNabb as the only remaining player in San Diego from the club's inaugural roster after Makenzy Robbe also departed. Kyra Carusa, Savannah McCaskill, Hanna Lundkvist, and Quincy McMahon also parted ways with the Wave.

In January 2026, the Wave acquired Brazilian forward Ludmila from Chicago Stars FC in exchange for a fee that could reach up to one million dollars. Fellow Brazilian Gabi Portilho, ex-Bay FC player Kiki Pickett, and NCAA national champion Mimi Van Zanten were also among San Diego's incoming transfers.

=== Kit changes ===
On February 26, 2026, the Wave unveiled its new community kit. Titled the 'Balboa Park Kit,' the new set of jerseys pays tribute to the historic San Diegan Balboa Park, featuring accents reminiscent of the park's tile work.

== Team ==
=== Current squad ===
As of August 9, 2026.

No.	Pos.	Nation	Player
1	GK	COL	Luisa Agudelo
2	DF	USA	Kennedy Wesley
3	DF	USA	Trinity Armstrong (SEI)
4	MF	ENG	Laila Harbert
6	DF	CAN	Brooklyn Courtnall
7	FW	USA	Melanie Barcenas
8	MF	USA	Kimmi Ascanio
9	FW	CAN	Adriana Leon
10	MF	FRA	Kenza Dali
11	MF	GER	Gia Corley
12	GK	ESP	Sandra Paños
14	DF	USA	Kristen McNabb
15	FW	USA	Trinity Byars
16	DF	JAM	Mimi Van Zanten
17	FW	BRA	Ludmila
18	MF	FRA	Laurina Fazer
19	MF	USA	Tatum Wynalda
20	FW	USA	Catarina Macario
22	MF	USA	Lia Godfrey
23	DF	USA	Nya Harrison
28	MF	USA	Jordan Fusco
31	GK	BIH	DiDi Haračić
33	MF	USA	Kiki Pickett
75	DF	FRA	Perle Morroni
81	FW	BRA	Gabi Portilho
88	FW	BRA	Dudinha (SEI)

=== Coaching staff ===
As of July 12, 2026.

Coaching
Head coach	Jonas Eidevall
Assistant Coach	Becki Tweed
Assistant Coach	Natalie Henderson
Goalkeeper Coach	Jason Batty
Technical
General Manager & Sporting Director	Camille Ashton
Technical Director	Chris Loxston

== Competitions ==
Win Draw Loss

=== Preseason ===
February 15 Coachella Valley Invitational	San Diego Wave FC	1–1	Kansas City Current	Indio, California
10:30 am PT	Corley 37'	Report	84' (o.g.)	Stadium: Empire Polo Club

February 21 Coachella Valley Invitational	San Diego Wave FC	2–5	Denver Summit FC	Indio, California
12:00 pm PT	Ludmila 13'; Godfrey 52'	Report	Means 4'; Kössler 23'; Flint 56'; Thomas 66', 89'	Stadium: Empire Polo Club

=== Regular season ===
==== Regular season standings ====
Pos	Team	Pld	W	D	L	GF	GA	GD	Pts	Qualification
1	Gotham FC (S)	30	18	7	5	39	23	+16	61	Playoffs and CONCACAF W Champions Cup
2	San Diego Wave FC	30	18	4	8	45	31	+14	58	Playoffs and CONCACAF W Champions Cup
3	Washington Spirit	30	17	4	9	43	28	+15	55	Playoffs
4	Kansas City Current	30	16	5	9	54	39	+15	53	Playoffs
5	Angel City FC	30	15	7	8	54	32	+22	52	Playoffs

Source: NWSL
Rules for classification: 1) points; 2) total goal difference; 3) total wins; 4) total goals scored; 5) head-to-head points; 6) head-to-head goal goals scored; 7) fewest disciplinary points; 8) coin toss (if 2 clubs tied) or drawing of lots (if ≥3 clubs tied).
(S) NWSL Shield

==== Results summary ====
Overall								Home						Away					
Pld	W	D	L	GF	GA	GD	Pts	W	D	L	GF	GA	GD	W	D	L	GF	GA	GD
30	18	4	8	45	31	+14	58	8	2	5	23	17	+6	10	2	3	22	14	+8

Last updated: November 1, 2026.
Source: NWSLsoccer.com

==== Results by matchday ====
Matchday	1	2	3	4	5	6	7	8	9	10	11	12	13	14	15	16	17	18	19	20	21	22	23	24	25	26	27	28	29	30
Ground	H	A	H	H	A	A	A	H	A	H	A	H	A	H	H	A	H	A	A	H	H	H	A	H	H	A	A	A	H	A
Result	L	W	W	W	W	W	L	L	W	W	D	L	W	W	L	D	L	W	L	D	W	W	L	W	W	W	W	W	D	W
Position	13	7	1	1	1	1	2	3	3	1	2	3	1	1	1	3	4	4	4	5	5	4	5	4	2	2	2	2	2	2

Updated to match(es) played on November 1, 2026. Source: NWSLsoccer.com
A = Away; H = Home; W = Win; D = Draw; L = Loss; P = Postponed; = NWSL Shield; = NWSL Playoffs

==== Matches ====
March 14 1	San Diego Wave FC	0–1	Houston Dash	San Diego, California
5:45 pm PT		Report	Robbe 45+7'; Larisey (yellow card) 80'; Van Zanten (yellow card) 88'	Stadium: Snapdragon Stadium; Attendance: 14,078; Referee: Muhammad Hassan

March 22 2	Utah Royals	1–2	San Diego Wave FC	Sandy, Utah
4:00 pm PT	Nagai (yellow card) 12'; Prašnikar (yellow card) 17', (goal) 67'; Milazzo (yellow card) 72' (yellow-red card) 82'; Spaanstra (yellow card) 73'	Report	Dudinha 18'; Morroni (yellow card) 55'; Godfrey 87'	Stadium: America First Field; Attendance: 9,778; Referee: Shawn Tehini

March 25 3	San Diego Wave FC	3–1	Portland Thorns FC	San Diego, California
7:00 pm PT	Dudinha 2'; Godfrey 27'; Morroni (yellow card) 54'; Barcenas 82'	Report	Tordin 8'; Moultrie (yellow card) 61'	Stadium: Snapdragon Stadium; Attendance: 8,428; Referee: Jaclyn Metz

March 28 4	San Diego Wave FC	2–0	Chicago Stars FC	San Diego, California
5:45 pm PT	Godfrey 56'; Barcenas 72'	Report	Pinto (yellow card) 53'	Stadium: Snapdragon Stadium; Attendance: 12,810; Referee: Servando Berna Rico

April 4 5	Boston Legacy FC	0–1	San Diego Wave FC	Foxborough, Massachusetts
5:00 pm PT	Carabalí (yellow card) 36'; Ansbrow (yellow card) 58'	Report	Ludmila 63'; Portilho (yellow card) 90'	Stadium: Gillette Stadium; Attendance: 10,123; Referee: Danielle Chesky

April 25 6	Denver Summit FC	2–3	San Diego Wave FC	Commerce City, Colorado
6:45 p.m. MDT (UTC-6)	Kössler 16'; Flint 32'; Oke (yellow card) 55'; Kurtz (yellow card) 59'; Gaetino (yellow card) 90+2'	Report	Godfrey 49'; Wesley 57'; Pickett 65' (o.g.); Morroni (yellow card) 88'	Stadium: Dick's Sporting Goods Park; Attendance: 16,932; Referee: Alex Billeter

April 29 7	Portland Thorns FC	2–0	San Diego Wave FC	Portland, Oregon
7:00 pm PT	Müller 10'; Wilson (yellow card) 40', (goal) 64'; Perry (yellow card) 85'	Report	Byars (yellow card) 72'	Stadium: Providence Park; Attendance: 19,806; Referee: Elton Garcia

May 3 8	San Diego Wave FC	0–1	Bay FC	San Diego, California
4:00 pm PT	Dali (penalty missed) 17'; Dudinha (yellow card) 54'; Morroni (yellow card) 59'	Report	Kundananji 5'; Hutton (yellow card) 11'; Cometti (yellow card) 15'; Silkowitz (penalty missed) 17'; Lema (yellow card) 43'; Denton (yellow card) 47'	Stadium: Snapdragon Stadium; Attendance: 13,508; Referee: Katja Koroleva

May 9 9	Angel City FC	1–2	San Diego Wave FC	Los Angeles, California
5:45 pm PT	Gorden (yellow card) 32'; Sams 54'	Report	Dudinha 49'; Van Zanten 81'	Stadium: BMO Stadium; Attendance: 17,169; Referee: Abdou Ndiaye

May 15 10	San Diego Wave FC	2–1	Washington Spirit	San Diego, California
7:00 pm PT	Byars 6'; Barcenas (yellow card) 73'; Ascanio 89'	Report	Bernal 33', (yellow card) 54'; Rodman (yellow card) 45+1'	Stadium: Snapdragon Stadium; Attendance: 12,810; Referee: Jeremy Scheer

May 20 11	Houston Dash	2–2	San Diego Wave FC	Houston, Texas
5:00 pm PT	Patterson (yellow card) 23'; Faasse 70'; Rader 89'	Report	Dudinha 20'; M. Van Zanten (yellow card) 24'; Morroni (yellow card) 32'; Byars (yellow card) 83', (goal) 90+5'; Fazer (yellow card) 90+8'	Stadium: Shell Energy Stadium; Attendance: 5,168; Referee: Gerald Flores

May 24 12	San Diego Wave FC	0–1	Orlando Pride	San Diego, California
4:00 pm PT	McNabb (yellow card) 36'	Report	Hernández (yellow card) 34'; Mace (yellow card) 42'; Payne 45+3'; McCutcheon (yellow card) 64'; Lemos (yellow card) 90+1'	Stadium: Snapdragon Stadium; Attendance: 12,149; Referee: Calin Radosav

May 31 13	Chicago Stars FC	0–2	San Diego Wave FC	Evanston, Illinois
10:00 am PT		Report	Dudinha 3'; Dali (yellow card) 18'; Morroni (yellow card) 22'; Byars 90+13'	Stadium: Martin Stadium; Attendance: 6,014; Referee: Robert Vincze

July 4 14	San Diego Wave FC	2–0	Gotham FC	San Diego, California
5:45 pm PT	Barcenas 45'; Dali (yellow card) 72'; Byars 90+3'	Report	Sonnett (yellow card) 62'	Stadium: Snapdragon Stadium; Attendance: 10,592; Referee: Jaclyn Metz

July 11 15	San Diego Wave FC	0–2	Angel City FC	San Diego, California
5:45 pm PT	Corley (yellow card) 5'; Morroni (yellow card) 18'; Godfrey (penalty missed) 86'	Report	Niehues 17'; Ary Borges 26'; Jónsdóttir (yellow card) 44'; Shores (yellow card) 81'	Stadium: Snapdragon Stadium; Attendance: 15,881; Referee: Katja Koroleva

July 17 16	Kansas City Current	2–2	San Diego Wave FC	Kansas City, Missouri
5:00 pm PT	Bethune 52'; Chawinga 61'; Hopkins (yellow card) 90+6'	Report	Byars 6', 90'; Dali (yellow card) 75'	Stadium: CPKC Stadium; Attendance: 11,500; Referee: Alyssa Pennington

July 26 17	San Diego Wave FC	0–2	Seattle Reign FC	San Diego, California
2:00 pm PT	Corley (yellow card) 48'	Report	Mercado 17', (yellow card) 45+2'; Bugg 20'; McClernon (yellow card) 25'	Stadium: Snapdragon Stadium; Attendance: 10,796; Referee: Mark Verso

August 2 18	Washington Spirit	0–1	San Diego Wave FC	Washington, D.C.
1:00 pm PT		Report	Barcenas (yellow card) 38'; Godfrey 60'; Fazer (yellow card) 75'; Dali (yellow card) 90+8'	Stadium: Audi Field; Attendance: 14,470; Referee: John Griggs

August 7 19	Gotham FC	1–0	San Diego Wave FC	Harrison, New Jersey
5:00 pm PT	McCaskill (yellow card) 35'; Shaw 44'	Report		Stadium: Sports Illustrated Stadium; Attendance: 6,329; Referee: Nabil Bensalah

August 14 20	San Diego Wave FC	1–1	Denver Summit FC	San Diego, California
7:00 pm PT	Barcenas 35'; Harbert (yellow card) 79'; Leon (yellow card) 90+1'	Report	Ryan 58'; Regan (yellow card) 90+3'	Stadium: Snapdragon Stadium; Attendance: 13,463; Referee: Lauren Aldrich

August 21 21	San Diego Wave FC	4–2	Utah Royals	San Diego, California
7:00 pm PT	Byars 4', 63'; Barcenas 40'; Ludmila 70'	Report	Tanaka 29', 47'	Stadium: Snapdragon Stadium; Attendance: 11,210; Referee: Elton García

August 28 22	San Diego Wave FC	3–2	Racing Louisville FC	San Diego, California
7:00 pm PT	Byars 47', 76'; Dali 80'; Barcenas] (yellow card) 88'	Report	Milliet 12'; Flint 23'; Fischer (yellow card) 58'; McMahon (yellow card) 59'; Hodge (yellow card) 86'	Stadium: Snapdragon Stadium; Attendance: 12,220; Referee: Atahan Yaya

September 6 23	Seattle Reign FC	1–0	San Diego Wave FC	Seattle, Washington
6:00 pm PT	Mercado 29'; Bugg (yellow card) 59'; McClernon (yellow card) 90+1'	Report	Van Zanten (red card) 13'	Stadium: Lumen Field; Attendance: 9,104; Referee: Abdou Ndiaye

September 12 24	San Diego Wave FC	2–1	North Carolina Courage	San Diego, California
3:30 pm PT	Corley 23'; Barcenas 72'	Report	Okafor (yellow card) 44'; Sanchez 82'	Stadium: Snapdragon Stadium; Attendance: 9,853; Referee: Matthew Thompson

September 18 25	San Diego Wave FC	2–0	Kansas City Current	San Diego, California
5:00 pm PT	Rouse 50' (o.g.); Barcenas (yellow card) 76'; McNabb (yellow card) 84'; Wesley 90+1'	Report	Rouse (yellow card) 68' (red card) 89'	Stadium: Snapdragon Stadium; Attendance: 10,761; Referee: Jeremy Scheer

September 25 26	Racing Louisville FC	0–2	San Diego Wave FC	Louisville, Kentucky
3:30 pm PT	Fischer (yellow card) 63'	Report	Corley 27'; Ludmila 49'	Stadium: Lynn Family Stadium; Attendance: 5,128; Referee: Joshua Encarnación

October 2 27	Orlando Pride	1–2	San Diego Wave FC	Orlando, Florida
5:00 pm PT	Banda 52' (pen.), (yellow card) 90+7'; Oihane (yellow card) 90+1'	Report	Godfrey 4'; Corley 22'	Stadium: Inter.co Stadium; Attendance: 8,672; Referee: Alexandra Billeter

October 17 28	North Carolina Courage	1–2	San Diego Wave FC	Cary, North Carolina
4:00 pm PT	Jacobs (yellow card) 60'; Bøe Risa 83'	Report	Barcenas 4'; Wesley (yellow card) 26'; Byars 52'	Stadium: WakeMed Soccer Park; Attendance: 10,353; Referee: Brad Jensen

October 25 29	San Diego Wave FC	2–2	Boston Legacy FC	San Diego, California
4:00 pm PT	Corley 51'; Araújo 54' (o.g.); Dali (yellow card) 90+3'	Report	Karich 48'; Caño 73'; Ivory (yellow card) 90+3'	Stadium: Snapdragon Stadium; Attendance: 15,701; Referee: Matthew Corrigan

November 1 30	Bay FC	0–1	San Diego Wave FC	San Jose, California
2:00 pm PT		Report	Van Zanten 9'	Stadium: PayPal Park; Attendance: 15,927; Referee: Iryna Petrunok

=== Playoffs ===
Quarterfinals
1	Gotham FC
8	Seattle Reign FC
4	Kansas City Current
5	Angel City FC
2	San Diego Wave FC
7	Utah Royals
3	Washington Spirit
6	Portland Thorns FC

Semifinals

Championship

November 6 Quarterfinals	San Diego Wave FC	0–1	Utah Royals	San Diego, California
7:00 pm PT	Bonansea (yellow card) 90'	Report	Palacios 30' (yellow card) 59'; Riehl (yellow card) 68'; Moriya (yellow card) 90+3'; Tejada (yellow card) 90+5'	Stadium: Snapdragon Stadium; Attendance: 12,638; Referee: Katja Koroleva

== Statistics ==
As of match played August 14, 2026

=== Appearances and goals ===
Starting appearances are listed first, followed by substitute appearances after the + symbol where applicable.

No.	Pos	Nat	Player	Total		NWSL		Playoffs	
No.	Pos	Nat	Player	Apps	Goals	Apps	Goals	Apps	Goals
Goalkeepers
0	GK	(United States) USA	Leah Freeman	6	0	6	0	0	0
1	GK	(Colombia) COL	Luisa Agudelo	3	0	3	0	0	0
12	GK	(Spain) ESP	Sandra Paños	4	0	4	0	0	0
31	GK	(Bosnia and Herzegovina) BIH	DiDi Haračić	7	0	7	0	0	0
Defenders
2	DF	(United States) USA	Kennedy Wesley	20	1	20	1	0	0
3	DF	(United States) USA	Trinity Armstrong	2	0	0+2	0	0	0
6	DF	(Canada) CAN	Brooklyn Courtnall	1	0	0+1	0	0	0
14	DF	(United States) USA	Kristen McNabb	20	0	20	0	0	0
16	DF	(Jamaica) JAM	Mimi Van Zanten	20	1	20	1	0	0
23	DF	(United States) USA	Nya Harrison	3	0	0+3	0	0	0
30	DF	(Colombia) COL	Daniela Arias	0	0	0	0	0	0
75	DF	(France) FRA	Perle Morroni	19	0	19	0	0	0
Midfielders
4	MF	(England) ENG	Laila Harbert	1	0	0+1	0	0	0
8	MF	(United States) USA	Kimmi Ascanio	19	1	16+3	1	0	0
10	MF	(France) FRA	Kenza Dali	18	0	16+2	0	0	0
11	MF	(Germany) GER	Gia Corley	16	0	13+3	0	0	0
18	MF	(France) FRA	Laurina Fazer	18	0	12+6	0	0	0
19	MF	(United States) USA	Tatum Wynalda	15	0	0+15	0	0	0
22	MF	(United States) USA	Lia Godfrey	20	5	12+8	5	0	0
28	MF	(United States) USA	Jordan Fusco	8	0	0+8	0	0	0
33	MF	(United States) USA	Kiki Pickett	8	0	1+7	0	0	0
Forwards
7	FW	(United States) USA	Melanie Barcenas	19	4	8+11	4	0	0
9	FW	(Canada) CAN	Adriana Leon	4	0	0+4	0	0	0
15	FW	(United States) USA	Trinity Byars	15	6	5+10	6	0	0
17	FW	(Brazil) BRA	Ludmila	19	1	18+1	1	0	0
20	FW	(United States) USA	Catarina Macario	0	0	0	0	0	0
81	FW	(Brazil) BRA	Gabi Portilho	17	0	7+10	0	0	0
88	FW	(Brazil) BRA	Dudinha	13	5	13	5	0	0

== Transactions ==
=== Contract operations ===
Date	Player	Pos.	Fee/notes	Contract until	Ref.
December 17, 2025	(United States) Jordan Fusco	MF	Free agent re-signing	2027	
December 31, 2025	(United States) Melanie Barcenas	FW	Free agent re-signing	2026	
January 2, 2026	(United States) Nya Harrison	DF	Free agent re-signing	2026	
January 16, 2026	(Bosnia and Herzegovina) DiDi Haračić	GK	Free agent re-signing	2026	
January 26, 2026	(Germany) Gia Corley	MF	Contract extension	2027	
March 5, 2026	(France) Kenza Dali	MF	Contract extension	2027	
April 27, 2026	(United States) Kristen McNabb	DF	Contract extension	2027	
July 9, 2026	(United States) Trinity Byars	FW	Contract extension	2028	

=== Transfers in ===
Date	Player	Pos.	Previous club	Fee/notes	Contract until	Ref.
December 29, 2025	(Jamaica) Mimi Van Zanten	DF	(United States) Florida State Seminoles	College signing	2027 + 2 options	
December 30, 2025	(United States) Lia Godfrey	MF	(United States) Virginia Cavaliers	College signing	2027 + 2 options	
January 12, 2026	(United States) Leah Freeman	GK	(United States) Bay FC	Free agent signing	2026	
January 13, 2026	(Brazil) Ludmila	FW	(United States) Chicago Stars	Acquired in trade for $800,000, with a possible additional $200,000, pending conditions met	2028	
January 16, 2026	(United States) Kiki Pickett	DF	(United States) Bay FC	Free agent signing	2027	
January 27, 2026	(Colombia) Luisa Agudelo	GK	(Colombia) Deportivo Cali	Acquired in exchange for an undisclosed transfer fee	2028	
March 2, 2026	(Brazil) Gabi Portilho	FW	(United States) Gotham FC	Acquired in trade for $175,000	2026 + option	
March 4, 2026	(United States) Tatum Wynalda	MF	(United States) Pepperdine Waves	College player signed to an injury replacement contract	Through 2026 NWSL season	
March 9, 2026	(United States) Jordan Fusco	MF	(United States) Tampa Bay Sun	Recall from loan	2027	
March 27, 2026	(United States) Catarina Macario	FW	(England) Chelsea	Acquired in trade for approximately $300,000	2030	
June 10, 2026	(Spain) Sandra Paños	GK	(Mexico) Club América	Signed as a free agent	2028	
July 28, 2026	(England) Laila Harbert	MF	(England) Arsenal	Acquired through 2029 NWSL season	2029	
July 31, 2026	(Canada) Brooklyn Courtnall	DF	(United States) Bay FC	Acquired on loan through 2026 NWSL season	2026	

=== Transfers out ===
Date	Player	Pos.	Destination club	Fee/notes	Ref.
December 9, 2025	(United States) Hillary Beall	GK	(United States) Houston Dash	Out of contract	
December 9, 2025	(Republic of Ireland) Kyra Carusa	FW	(Denmark) HB Køge	Out of contract	
December 9, 2025	(Canada) Mya Jones	FW	(Canada) Calgary Wild	Out of contract	
December 9, 2025	(Sweden) Hanna Lundkvist	DF	(England) Manchester United	Out of contract	
December 9, 2025	(Nigeria) Chiamaka Okwuchukwu	FW		Out of contract	
December 9, 2025	(United States) Makenzy Robbe	FW	(United States) Houston Dash	Out of contract	
December 17, 2024	(United States) Jordan Fusco	MF	(United States) Tampa Bay Sun	Loan through June 8, 2026	
December 29, 2025	(Canada) Kailen Sheridan	GK	(United States) North Carolina Courage	Mutual contract termination	
January 2, 2026	(United States) Savannah McCaskill	MF	(United States) Gotham FC	Traded for $175,000 in intraleague transfer funds	
January 12, 2026	(United States) Quincy McMahon	DF	(United States) Racing Louisville	Traded for $50,000 in allocation money and a 2026 + 2027 international roster spot	
January 18, 2026	(France) Delphine Cascarino	FW	(England) London City Lionesses	Mutual contract termination	
January 30, 2026	(Colombia) Sintia Cabezas	DF	(France) Les Marseillaises	Transfer for an undisclosed fee	
June 23, 2026	(Colombia) Daniela Arias	DF		Mutually agreed to part ways	
July 23, 2026	(United States) Leah Freeman	GK	(Italy) Lazio	Mutually agreed to part ways	

=== Preseason trialists ===
Trialists are non-rostered invitees during preseason and are not automatically signed. The Wave's preseason roster, which was released on January 16, 2026, listed four non-rostered invitees.

Player	Pos.	Previous club	Ref.
(United States) Jordan Brewster	DF	(United States) Bay FC	
(United States) Kali Kniskern	FW	(Mexico) Club Tijuana	
(United States) Molly McDougal	DF	(United States) USC Trojans	
(United States) Tatum Wynalda	FW	(United States) Pepperdine Waves	

Signed to first-team contract.
