= 2025 USC Trojans women's soccer team =

American college soccer season

2025 USC Trojans women's soccer
- Conference: Big Ten Conference
- U. Soc. Coaches poll: No. 5
- TopDrawerSoccer.com: No. 17
- Record: 3-0-0 (0-0-0 Big Ten)
- Head coach: Jane Alukonis (3rd season)
- Assistant coaches: Sugar Shinohara (3rd season); Ahmad Brown (3rd season); Megan Hinz (1st season)
- Home stadium: Rawlinson Stadium

2025 Big Ten Conference women's soccer standings
	Conf.						Overall
Team	W		L		T	PCT	W		L		T	PCT
No. 6 Washington ‍†‍‡‍^{y}	8	–	1	–	2	.818	15	–	3	–	7	.740
No. 7 Michigan St ‍‍‍^{y}	7	–	1	–	3	.773	15	–	4	–	6	.720
No. 21 Iowa ‍‍‍^{y}	6	–	2	–	3	.682	12	–	5	–	4	.667
No. 22 UCLA ‍‍‍^{y}	6	–	2	–	3	.682	12	–	5	–	4	.667
No. 23 Wisconsin ‍‍‍^{y}	6	–	3	–	2	.636	14	–	6	–	2	.682
Illinois ‍‍‍^{y}	5	–	4	–	2	.545	13	–	6	–	2	.667
Penn St ‍‍‍^{y}	5	–	4	–	2	.545	10	–	8	–	3	.548
Northwestern ‍‍‍^{y}	4	–	2	–	5	.591	9	–	4	–	8	.619
No. 9т Ohio St ‍‍‍^{y}	4	–	2	–	5	.591	11	–	5	–	6	.636
USC ‍‍‍	4	–	5	–	2	.455	7	–	7	–	3	.500
Michigan ‍‍‍	3	–	4	–	4	.455	6	–	8	–	4	.444
Nebraska ‍‍‍	3	–	5	–	3	.409	8	–	5	–	5	.583
Indiana ‍‍‍	2	–	4	–	5	.409	5	–	6	–	6	.471
Purdue ‍‍‍	3	–	7	–	1	.318	6	–	10	–	3	.395
Minnesota ‍‍‍	2	–	6	–	3	.318	6	–	8	–	3	.441
Rutgers ‍‍‍	2	–	7	–	2	.273	4	–	7	–	5	.406
Maryland ‍‍‍	2	–	8	–	1	.227	6	–	11	–	1	.361
Oregon ‍‍‍	1	–	6	–	4	.273	3	–	10	–	5	.306
† – Conference champion ‡ – 2025 Big Ten Tournament champion y – Invited to the NCAA Tournament; As of December 9, 2025; Rankings from United Soccer Coaches Poll; Source:Big Ten

The 2025 USC Trojans women's soccer team will represent the University of Southern California (USC) during the 2025 NCAA Division I women's soccer season. The Trojans are going into the season as defending Big Ten Conference regular-season champions.

== Squad ==
=== Roster ===
As of 1 August 2025

=== Team management ===
Position	Staff
Athletic Director	Jennifer Cohen
Head coach	Jane Alikonis
Assistant Coach	Sugar Shinohara
Assistant Coach	Ahmad Brown
Assistant/Goalkeepers Coach	Megan Hinz
Director of Operations	Spencer Williams
Assistant Sports Performance Coach	Aleksander Beljic

== Schedule ==
Date Time, TV	Rank^{#}	Opponent^{#}	Result	Record	Site (Attendance) City, State
Exhibition
August 6th 7:00 p.m.	No. 5	at Long Beach State	Not Reported	--	George Allen Field (--); Long Beach, California
Non-conference regular season
August 17th 5:00 p.m., BTN+	No. 5	California Baptist	W 4-0	1-0-0	Rawlinson Stadium (2,139); Los Angeles, California
August 21st 7:00 p.m., BTN+	No. 5	Pepperdine	W 3-2	2-0-0	Rawlinson Stadium (782); Los Angeles, California
August 24th 2:00 p.m., BTN+	No. 5	New Mexico State	W 4-0	3-0-0	Rawlinson Stadium (1,638); Los Angeles, California
August 28th 7:00 p.m., BTN+	No. 4т	Portland			Rawlinson Stadium; Los Angeles, California
September 4th 7:00 p.m., BTN	No. 4т	Stanford			Rawlinson Stadium; Los Angeles, California
Big Ten Conference Regular season
September 11th 7:00 p.m., BTN		Washington			Rawlinson Stadium; Los Angeles, California
September 18th 4:00 p.m., BTN+		at Michigan			U-M Soccer Stadium; Ann Arbor, Michigan
September 21st 10:00 a.m., BTN+		at Michigan State			DeMartin Stadium; East Lansing, Michigan
September 25th 7:00 p.m., BTN+		Maryland			Rawlinson Stadium; Los Angeles, California
September 28th 1:00 p.m., BTN		Rutgers			Rawlinson Stadium; Los Angeles, California
October 3rd 1:00 p.m., BTN+		at Oregon			Pape Field; Eugene, Oregon
October 9th 5:00 p.m., BTN+		at Minnesota			Elizabeth Lyle Robbie Stadium; Minneapolis, Minnesota
October 12th 10:00 a.m., BTN+		at Wisconsin			McClimon Stadium; Madison, Wisconsin
October 16th 7:00 p.m., BTN+		Nebraska			Rawlinson Stadium; Los Angeles, California
October 19th 6:00 p.m., BTN+		Iowa; Senior Day or Night			Rawlinson Stadium; Los Angeles, California
October 26th 2:00 p.m., BTN		at UCLA; Rivalry			Wallis Annenberg Stadium; Los Angeles, California
Big Ten Tournament
NCAA tournament
*Non-conference game. ^{#}Rankings from United Soccer Coaches. (#) Tournament seedings in parentheses. All times are in Pacific.

== Game summaries ==
=== at Long Beach State (Exhibition) ===
August 6 Exhibition	USC Trojans	–	Long Beach State	Long Beach, California
7:00 p.m. PST				Stadium: George Allen Field

=== vs California Baptist (Season and Stadium Opener) ===
August 17 1 - Home Opener	California Baptist	–	USC Trojans	Los Angeles, California
5:00 p.m. PST				Stadium: Rawlinson Stadium

=== vs Pepperdine ===
August 21 2	Pepperdine	–	USC Trojans	Los Angeles, California
7:00 p.m.				Stadium: Rawlinson Stadium

=== vs New Mexico State ===
August 24 3	New Mexico State	–	USC Trojans	Los Angeles, California
2:00 p.m.				Stadium: Rawlinson Stadium

=== vs Portland ===
August 28 4	Portland	–	USC Trojans	Los Angeles, California
7:00 p.m.				Stadium: Rawlinson Stadium

=== vs Stanford ===
September 4 5	Stanford	–	USC Trojans	Los Angeles, California
7:00 p.m.				Stadium: Rawlinson Stadium

== Rankings ==
Ranking movements Legend: ██ Increase in ranking ██ Decrease in ranking
	Week																	
Poll	Pre	1	2	3	4	5	6	7	8	9	10	11	12	13	14	15	16	Final
United Soccer	5	5	5										Not released					
TopDrawer Soccer	21	20	17															
