= Talia Sommer =

Israeli footballer (born 2004)

Talia Sommer טליה זומר
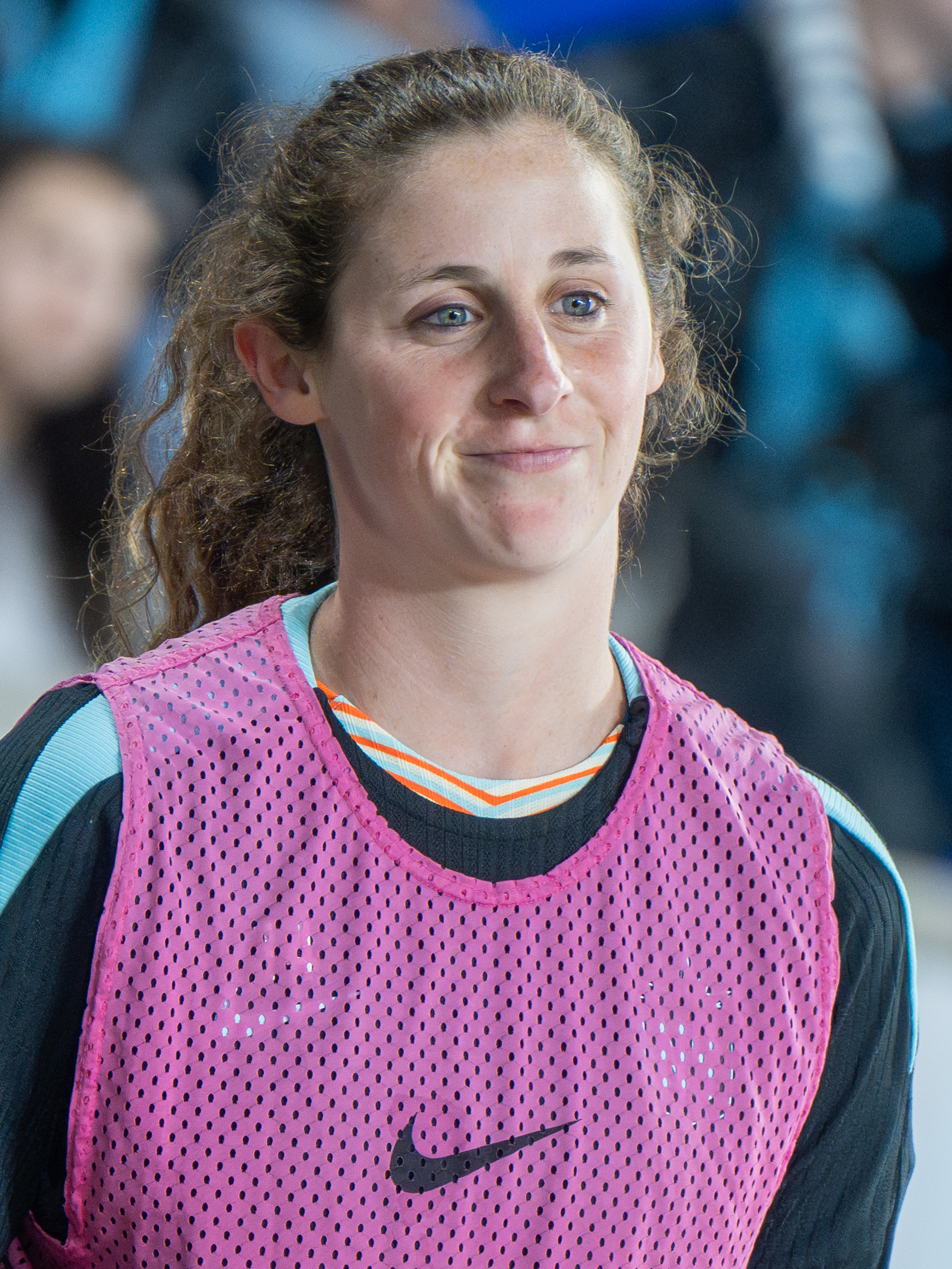
- Sommer with Gotham FC in 2026

Personal information
- Date of birth: 19 February 2004 (age 22)
- Place of birth: New York City, New York, United States
- Height: 5 ft 7 in (1.70 m)
- Position: Midfielder

Team information
- Current team: Gotham FC
- Number: 14

College career
Years	Team	Apps	(Gls)
2022–2025	Butler Bulldogs	72	(28)

Senior career*
Years	Team	Apps	(Gls)
2026–	Gotham FC	8	(0)

International career^{‡}
2019	Israel U16	3	(1)
2019	Israel U17	3	(0)
2022	Israel U19	3	(1)
2021–	Israel	32	(9)
- * Club domestic league appearances and goals as of 1 November 2026 ‡ National team caps and goals as of 15 October 2026

Talia Sommer (Hebrew: טליה זומר; born 19 February 2004) is a professional footballer who plays as a midfielder for Gotham FC of the National Women's Soccer League (NWSL). Born in the United States, she plays for the Israel national team. She played college soccer for the Butler Bulldogs.

== Early life ==
Born in New York, Sommer moved from the United States to Israel at the age of six. She began playing football at the age of four, and in her early years she played for the boy's team of Maccabi Tel Aviv, before her family relocated to the United States, where she played youth football with the Manhattan Soccer Club. She first played with girls at the age of 12 during her time with Manhattan Soccer Club, when she had moved back to the United States while her father taught at Columbia University. She attended Herzliya Hebrew Gymnasium in Israel, where she won the Israeli High School Cup. She then attended Butler University in the United States, where she studied physics. Sommer obtained outstanding athlete status designation in the IDF when she was 18, allowing her to begin her NCAA Division I career.

== College career ==
Sommer played for the Butler Bulldogs from 2022 to 2025, scoring 28 goals and adding 24 assists in 72 games. She cited the coaching staff at Butler as the primary reason for her choice to join the program. She earned All-Big East honors every year, including three straight first-team selections. In 2025, she was named the Big East Co-Midfielder of the Year. She was also named to the fourth-team of the United Soccer Coaches' 2025 Women's All-America Teams.

Sommer was named to the Scholar All-America Second Team and the All-North/Central Region Team in 2025, and graduated with a bachelor's degree in Computational Neuroscience with a minor in Philosophy.

== Club career ==
=== ASA Tel Aviv ===
Sommer played for ASA Tel Aviv, making her Ligat Nashim debut at the age of 14. Competing with the team she won both the league and the Israeli Women's Cup.

=== Gotham FC ===
On 9 December 2025, Sommer joined the 2026 NWSL rookie class as Gotham FC announced her signing on a one-year contract, making her the club's first signing ahead of the 2026 season. She is the first Israeli player to join the NWSL, and upon signing with Gotham she said "I’m proud to be the first Israeli selected to play in the best league in the world, and I promise that every time I step onto the field, I’ll represent not just myself and my family, who always support me with love, but also my country and the flag I love so much." Speaking in November of 2026, Sommer said that she knew before it was announced that there would be backlash about her signing, describing it as being motivated by "clear racism" and antisemitism. Sommer made her professional debut on 1 February 2026, coming on as a second-half substitute for Mandy Freeman in Gotham's FIFA Women's Champions Cup third place win over AS FAR. Sommer was on the injury list and unavailable for selection for Gotham's opening game of the 2026 season due to a thigh injury. She made her first-ever start for Gotham on 23 May 2026, featuring in a 3–0 loss against CF Pachuca in the third-place match of the 2026 CONCACAF W Champions Cup. Sommer was part of the Gotham team which won the 2026 NWSL Challenge Cup. She was part of the team which won the 2026 NWSL Shield.

== International career ==
Sommer made multiple appearances during Israel's 2023 World Cup qualification campaign. Sommer featured as part of Israel's squad in their 2027 World Cup qualification campaign. She was described by former Israeli national team captain Oshrat Eini as "one of the most talented players to have grown up in Israel". Sommer has said that her overall dream in football is to help Israel to qualify for the World Cup.

On 9 October 2026, Sommer scored her first international career hattrick in a 3–7 loss against Switzerland in a World Cup Qualifying playoff match.

== Style of play ==
Sommer mainly operates as an attacking midfielder. She was described as "one of the most promising players in Israeli women's soccer".

== International goals ==
No.	Date	Venue	Opponent	Score	Result	Competition
1.	21 February 2022	Pampeloponnisiako Stadium, Patras, Greece	Greece	2–2	2–2	Friendly
2.	29 November 2023	Armavir City Stadium, Armavir, Armenia	Armenia	1–0	4–0	2023–24 UEFA Women's Nations League C
3.	31 May 2024	Hampden Park, Glasgow, Scotland	Scotland	1–4	1–4	UEFA Women's Euro 2025 qualifying
4.	21 February 2025	Stadion Aleksandar Shalamanov, Sofia, Bulgaria	Bulgaria	2–1	3–1	2025 UEFA Women's Nations League C
5.	8 April 2025	Budaörsi Városi Stadium, Budaörs, Hungary	Bulgaria	2–2	3–3	2025 UEFA Women's Nations League C
6.	8 April 2025	Budaörsi Városi Stadium, Budaörs, Hungary	Bulgaria	3–2	3–3	2025 UEFA Women's Nations League C
7.	9 October 2026	Mezőkövesdi Városi Stadion, Mezőkövesd, Hungary	Switzerland	1–1	3–7	2027 FIFA Women's World Cup qualification
8.	9 October 2026	Mezőkövesdi Városi Stadion, Mezőkövesd, Hungary	Switzerland	2–1	3–7	2027 FIFA Women's World Cup qualification
9.	9 October 2026	Mezőkövesdi Városi Stadion, Mezőkövesd, Hungary	Switzerland	3–3	3–7	2027 FIFA Women's World Cup qualification

== Personal life ==
Sommer is the daughter of a political science professor and clinical psychologist.

In a July 2026 Kan interview on Yair Agmon's the Hitchikers program, when asked whether she identified as American or Israeli, Sommer said she identified as Israeli and that her "life revolves around Israel" and the national football team. In the same interview, Sommer discussed her closeness with the mother of kidnapped Israeli Defense Forces (IDF) soldier Naama Levy, who she met through the Israeli national football team and how this shaped her views on Israel and the Gaza War. She has discussed her time in college and how she had argued with a professor of hers who had endorsed a statement by Students for Justice in Palestine (SJP). Notably, she claimed the signed letter praised the October 7 attacks, but the letter from the Butler University chapter does not endorse the attack or its perpetrators.

Sommer has described herself as gay and said as of November 2026 that she has a girlfriend.

== Honors and awards ==
Gotham FC

- NWSL Shield: 2026
- NWSL Challenge Cup: 2026

Individual

- Fourth-team All-American: 2025
- Big East Co-Midfielder of the Year: 2025
- Big East Freshman of the Year: 2022
- First-team All-Big East: 2023, 2024, 2025
- Second-team All-Big East: 2022
