= NWSL Rookie of the Year =

Annual award in US women's soccer

2026 winner Jordynn Dudley

The NWSL Rookie of the Year award is presented annually to the best rookie in the National Women's Soccer League (NWSL).

Erika Tymrak (2013), an alumna of the Florida Gators, won the first Rookie of the Year award in the NWSL's inaugural season. The most recent winner is Jordynn Dudley (2026).

As of 2025, the NWSL's individual end-of-year awards are voted upon in two rounds: in the first round, players (50%), owners/general managers/coaches (25%), and media (25%) vote to determine the nominees; in the second round, players (40%), owners/general managers/coaches (25%), media (25%), and fans (10%) vote among the nominees to determine the winner.

== Winners ==
Season	Player	Pos.	Nationality	Club	School	Drafted	Other finalists	Ref.
2013	Erika Tymrak	MF	United States	FC Kansas City	Florida Gators	11th	Adrianna Franch, Sydney Leroux	
2014	Julie Johnston	D/MF	United States	Chicago Red Stars	Santa Clara Broncos	3rd	Crystal Dunn, Kealia Ohai	
2015	Danielle Colaprico	MF	United States	Chicago Red Stars	Virginia Cavaliers	9th	Sofia Huerta, Sam Mewis	
2016	Rocky Rodríguez	MF	Costa Rica	Sky Blue FC (Note: Gotham FC was previously known as Sky Blue FC and NJ/NY Gotham FC.)	Penn State Nittany Lions	2nd	Rachel Daly, Emily Sonnett	
2017	Ashley Hatch	F	United States	North Carolina Courage	BYU Cougars	2nd	Meggie Dougherty Howard, Mallory Pugh	
2018	Imani Dorsey	F/MF	United States	Sky Blue FC	Duke Blue Devils	5th	Savannah McCaskill, Andi Sullivan	
2019	Bethany Balcer	F	United States	Reign FC	Spring Arbor Cougars	Undrafted	Jordan DiBiasi, Sam Staab	
2020	2020 regular season cancelled due COVID-19 pandemic							
2021	Trinity Rodman	F	United States	Washington Spirit	Washington State Cougars	2nd	Emily Fox, Victoria Pickett	
2022	Naomi Girma	D	United States	San Diego Wave FC	Stanford Cardinal	1st	Sam Coffey, Diana Ordóñez	
2023	Jenna Nighswonger	D	United States	NJ/NY Gotham FC	Florida State Seminoles	4th	Messiah Bright, Alyssa Thompson	
2024	Croix Bethune	MF	United States	Washington Spirit	Georgia Bulldogs	3rd	Claire Hutton, Ally Sentnor	
2025	Lilly Reale	DF	United States	Gotham FC	UCLA Bruins	N/A	Maddie Dahlien, Riley Tiernan	
2026	Jordynn Dudley	FW	United States	Gotham FC	Florida State Seminoles	N/A	Kat Rader, Mimi Van Zanten	

== Wins by team ==
Club	Wins
Gotham FC	5
Chicago Red Stars	2
Washington Spirit	2
FC Kansas City	1
North Carolina Courage	1
San Diego Wave FC	1

== See also ==
- List of sports awards honoring women
- NWSL Players' Awards
- NWSL awards
- NWSL records and statistics
- Women's soccer in the United States
