= Kelsey Branson =

American soccer player (born 2004)

Personal information
- Full name: Kelsey Alexandra Branson
- Date of birth: May 10, 2004 (age 22)
- Height: 5 ft 10 in (1.78 m)
- Position: Midfielder

Youth career
- 2018–2022: Cathedral Catholic Dons

College career
Years	Team	Apps	(Gls)
2022–2025	Washington Huskies	81	(16)

Senior career*
Years	Team	Apps	(Gls)
2026	Kansas City Current	1	(0)
2026	Seattle Reign	0	(0)
- * Club domestic league appearances and goals as of 02:07, October 6, 2026 (UTC)

Kelsey Alexandra Branson (born May 10, 2004) is an American professional soccer player who plays as a midfielder. She played college soccer for the Washington Huskies before starting her professional career with the Kansas City Current and Seattle Reign FC of the National Women's Soccer League (NWSL).

== Early life ==
Branson was raised in San Diego, California, the daughter of Ali and Tim Branson, and has two siblings. Her mother played college soccer and her father played college rugby for the Santa Clara Broncos. Branson attended Cathedral Catholic High School in San Diego, where she scored 60 goals with 21 assists over her career. She helped the team win their first California Interscholastic Federation (CIF) Open Division title as a sophomore in 2020. She was named first-team all-conference every year and was named the CIF-San Diego Western League Player of the Year as the team's leading scorer and senior captain in 2022. She also played beach volleyball in high school. She played club soccer for San Diego Surf. She committed to Washington in her senior year.

== College career ==
Branson played in 16 games, starting 7, and scored 5 goals for the Washington Huskies as a freshman in 2022. Despite being limited by injury, she ranked second on the team in goals and was named to the Pac-12 Conference all-freshman team and ranked 29th by TopDrawerSoccer in their top 100 freshman list. She started all 19 games and scored 4 goals as a sophomore in 2023, again second on the team. In her junior year in 2024, she started all 21 games and scored 2 goals in Washington's first year in the Big Ten Conference. Washington reached the Big Ten tournament semifinals and earned their first NCAA tournament berth in four seasons. In her senior year in 2025, she captained the Huskies to their first Big Ten regular-season and tournament titles, then reached the NCAA tournament quarterfinals for the third time in program history. It was also a difficult season for Washington as she and the Huskies lost her close friend and teammate Mia Hamant to a rare form of kidney cancer. Branson started all 25 games and scored 5 goals, ranking third on the team in scoring, and earned third-team All-Big Ten honors.

== Club career ==
Branson joined the Kansas City Current as a non-roster invitee in the NWSL preseason in January 2026, joining Huskies teammate Kolo Suliafu. On March 21, she signed her first professional contract with the club on a one-month injury replacement deal. She made her professional debut and lone appearance for Kansas City four days later, starting in a 3–0 defeat to the Seattle Reign.

Following her stint in Kansas City, Branson spent time with the Seattle Reign as a non-rostered trialist. On August 26, 2026, Branson was announced to have signed a one-month national team replacement contract with Seattle.

== Honors and awards ==
Washington Huskies

- Big Ten Conference: 2025
- Big Ten Conference tournament: 2025

Individual

- Third-team All-Big Ten: 2025
- Pac-12 all-freshman team: 2022
