= Jordynn Dudley =

American soccer player (born 2004)

- Dudley with Gotham FC in 2026

Personal information
- Full name: Jordynn Araya Dudley
- Date of birth: November 21, 2004 (age 21)
- Height: 5 ft 11 in (1.80 m)
- Positions: Right winger; striker

Team information
- Current team: Gotham FC
- Number: 2

Youth career
- United Futbol Academy
- 2019–2022: Cambridge Bears

College career
Years	Team	Apps	(Gls)
2023–2025	Florida State Seminoles	53	(30)

Senior career*
Years	Team	Apps	(Gls)
2024	UFA Gunners	–	(5)
2026–	Gotham FC	25	(4)

International career^{‡}
2023–2024	United States U-20	14	(5)
Medal record
Women's soccer
FIFA U-20 Women's World Cup
Bronze medal – third place	Colombia 2024
- * Club domestic league appearances and goals as of September 26, 2026 ‡ National team caps and goals as of September 21, 2024

Jordynn Araya Dudley (born November 21, 2004) is an American professional soccer player who plays as a right winger for Gotham FC of the National Women's Soccer League (NWSL). She played college soccer for the Florida State Seminoles, leading the team to two national championships (2023 and 2025) and earning All-American honors all three years. She won bronze with the United States at the 2024 FIFA U-20 Women's World Cup.

== Early life ==
Dudley was raised in Milton, Georgia, the daughter of Georgette McCray and Donald Dudley, and has an older brother. She began playing soccer when she was two years old. She attended Cambridge High School and earned all-state honors in soccer all four years there. She also played basketball growing up and became her high school's all-time scoring leader with more than 2,000 career points. She played youth club soccer for United Futbol Academy, earning ECNL All-American honors in 2023. She committed to play for Florida State under Mark Krikorian, then signed her national letter of intent to reaffirm her commitment under new head Brian Pensky.

== College career ==
Dudley scored 14 goals and added 9 assists in 22 games for the Florida State Seminoles as a freshman in 2023. She scored a brace in a 3–3 draw against then-No. 1 North Carolina. In the ACC tournament, she scored against Pittsburgh in the semifinals and had an assist to Onyi Echegini against Clemson in the final. In the NCAA tournament, she scored four goals, two of them game winners. In the national title game, she converted a penalty to open the scoring and added an assist in a 5–1 victory over Stanford, helping the Seminoles become undefeated national champions and win the fourth national title in program history. She was recognized as the ACC Freshman of the Year, TopDrawerSoccer National Freshman of the Year, first-team All-ACC, first-team All-American, and the NCAA College Cup's Most Outstanding Offensive Player.

Dudley scored 9 goals and led the Seminoles with 11 assists in 15 games as a sophomore in 2024. She assisted in all three rounds in the ACC tournament, helping the Noles win their fifth consecutive ACC tournament title. Florida State earned a one seed in the NCAA tournament but was upset on penalties by Vanderbilt. She was named first-team All-ACC and second-team All-American.

Dudley with Florida State in 2025

Dudley scored 11 goals and again led the Seminoles with 14 assists (fifth in the nation) in 22 games as a junior in 2025. In the NCAA tournament, she had two goals and three assists including a brace against Ohio State in the quarterfinals. She earned her second national title after winning 1–0 against Stanford in the final. She was named first-team All-ACC and first-team All-American (becoming the first Seminole to be named All-American in each of her first three years), received the Honda Sports Award for soccer, and was one of three finalists for the Hermann Trophy. After three seasons at Florida State, she elected to go pro and give up her remaining year of college eligibility.

== Club career ==
Reigning NWSL champions Gotham FC announced on January 26, 2026, that they had signed Dudley to her first professional contract on a three-year deal. ESPN's Jeff Kassouf labeled her "arguably the top college prospect" of her rookie class. She made her professional debut in the season opener on March 14, replacing Sarah Schupansky at halftime in a 1–0 win over expansion team Boston Legacy. On April 29, she scored her first professional goal in the first minute against the Chicago Stars; it was the second-fastest goal in club history at 46 seconds into the 2–0 victory. She was named the NWSL Rookie of the Month for her performances in April, recording a goal and an assist in three games.

On June 26, 2026, Dudley scored an impressive solo goal in the NWSL Challenge Cup against the Kansas City Current, sealing a 2–0 victory for her first professional trophy. On September 19, she scored twice in a 2–1 win against the North Carolina Courage, her first professional brace, as Gotham clinched a playoff berth on the weekend, and picked up a second NWSL Rookie of the Month honor at the end of September. The next month, she suffered a season-ending foot fracture in training, ending her rookie season with 5 goals in 26 appearances in all competitions.

== International career ==
Dudley was called into training camp with the United States under-14 team in July 2018. She trained with the combined under-18/under-19 teams in January 2023, then moved up to the under-20 team three months later. She represented the United States at the 2023 CONCACAF Women's U-20 Championship, scoring on a header just 25 seconds into the opening 6–0 win over Panama. The United States finished the tournament runner-up to Mexico, qualifying for the 2024 FIFA U-20 Women's World Cup.

Dudley started the opening match at the 2024 U-20 Women's World Cup but missed the rest of the group stage after being in concussion protocol. She returned off the bench in the first knockout round, scoring in extra time to defeat Mexico 3–2. In the quarterfinals, trailing Germany 2–0, the United States came back in the last moments of regulation with a goal from Dudley and an own goal forced by Ally Sentnor in the 90+8th and 90+9th minutes; they advanced in a penalty shootout. After falling to North Korea, the United States won the third place game 2–1 over the Netherlands, its best result since 2012. She was called up by Emma Hayes into Futures Camp, practicing concurrently with the senior national team, in January 2025.

== Honors and awards ==
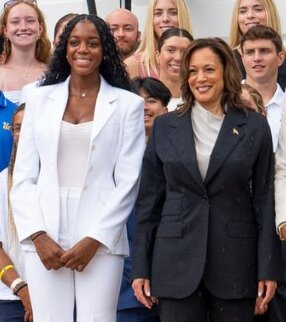
Dudley with Vice President Kamala Harris at the White House in 2024

Florida State Seminoles

- NCAA Division I tournament: 2023, 2025
- Atlantic Coast Conference tournament: 2023, 2024
- Atlantic Coast Conference: 2023

Gotham FC

- NWSL Shield: 2026
- NWSL Challenge Cup: 2026

United States U-20

- FIFA U-20 Women's World Cup bronze medal: 2024

Individual

- NWSL Rookie of the Year: 2026
- NWSL Rookie of the Month: April 2026, September 2026
- First-team All-American: 2023, 2025
- Second-team All-American: 2024
- First-team All-ACC: 2023, 2024, 2025
- TopDrawerSoccer National Freshman of the Year: 2023
- ACC Freshman of the Year: 2023
- NCAA Tournament Most Outstanding Offensive Player: 2023
- ACC tournament all-tournament team: 2023, 2024
