= Daniela Arias =

Colombian footballer (born 1994)

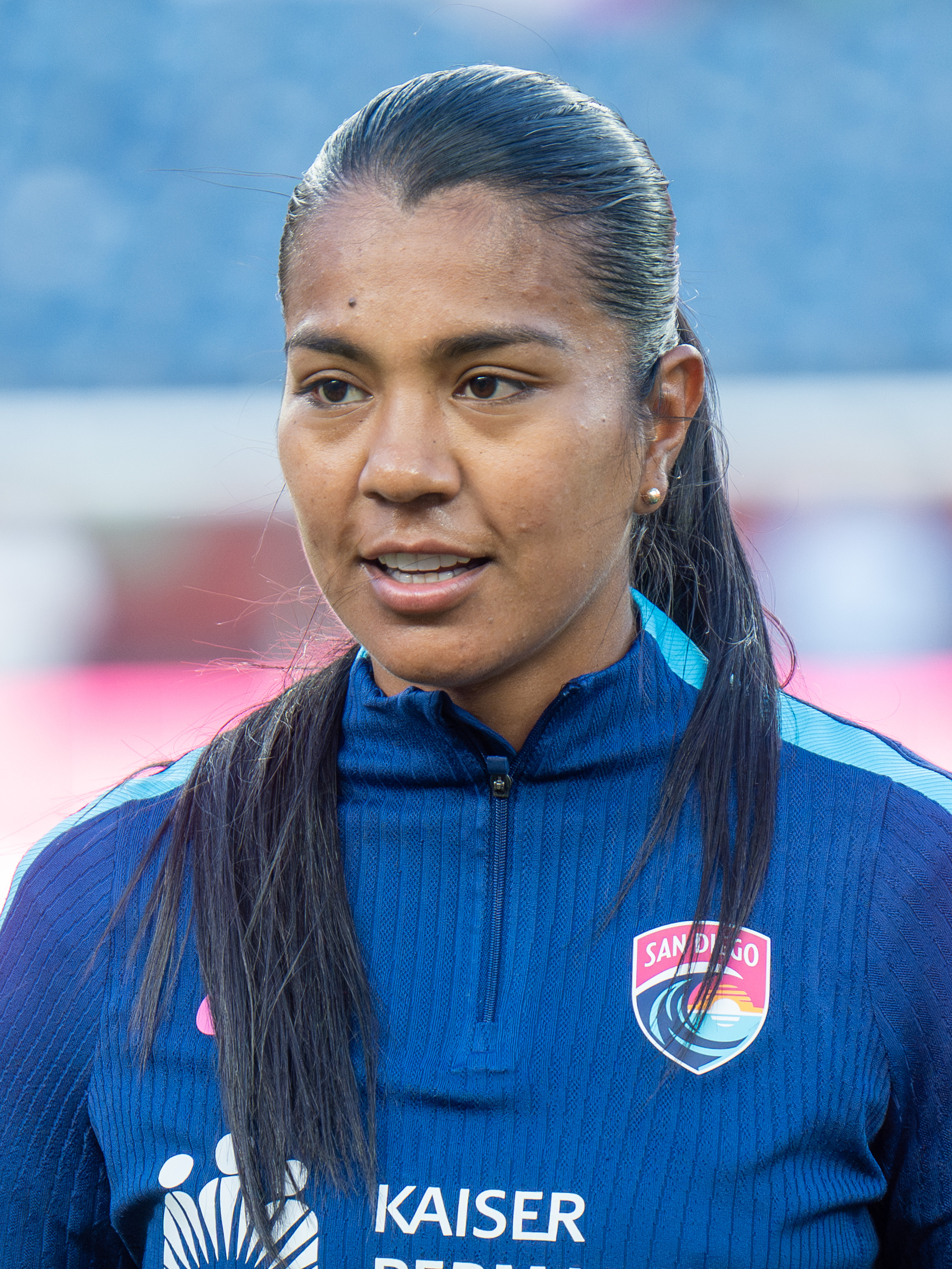
- Arias with the San Diego Wave in 2026

Personal information
- Full name: Daniela Alexandra Arias Rojas
- Date of birth: 31 August 1994 (age 32)
- Place of birth: Bucaramanga, Colombia
- Height: 1.74 m (5 ft 9 in)
- Position: Centre back

Team information
- Current team: Club León
- Number: 3

Senior career*
Years	Team	Apps	(Gls)
2017–2018	Atlético Bucaramanga		
2019	Independiente Medellín		
2020	Atlético Junior		
2021	América de Cali	10	(0)
2022	Pachuca	23	(1)
2023	América de Cali	20	(3)
2024–2025	Corinthians	14	(0)
2025–2026	San Diego Wave	2	(0)
2026–	Club León	0	(0)

International career
2018–	Colombia	19	(3)
Medal record
Women's football
Representing Colombia
CONMEBOL Women's Nations League
Gold medal – first place	2025–26
Copa América Femenina
Runner-up	2022 Colombia
Silver medal – second place	2025 Ecuador
Pan American Games
Gold medal – first place	2019 Lima	Team
- * Club domestic league appearances and goals as of 24 June 2026

Daniela Alexandra Arias Rojas (born 31 August 1994) is a Colombian professional footballer who plays as a centre back for Liga MX Femenil side Club León and the Colombia national team.

Arias began her career with Atlético Bucaramanga in her home city and played for Independiente Medellín, Atlético Junior and América de Cali before moving abroad, first to Pachuca in Mexico and then, in 2024, to Corinthians, with whom she won the Copa Libertadores and the Campeonato Brasileiro in her first season and was named the Brazilian league's best defender. She later played for San Diego Wave in the National Women's Soccer League (NWSL) before joining León in 2026. A Colombia international since 2018, she won gold at the 2019 Pan American Games, started at the 2023 FIFA Women's World Cup as Colombia reached the quarter-finals, finished as a runner-up at the 2022 and 2025 Copa América Femenina, and captained a settled defence as Colombia won the first CONMEBOL Women's Nations League in 2026.

== Early life ==
Arias grew up in the Buenos Aires neighbourhood of the Morrorrico sector of Bucaramanga, in Santander. Her father, Luis Alberto Arias, played microfútbol, while her mother, Gladis Rojas, was at first reluctant to let her take up the game. Arias began playing at the age of seven on a parking lot belonging to her uncle in Morrorrico, alongside cousins and other children from the neighbourhood, and was often left out of games by boys who did not want a girl in the side.

At 16 she joined the Botín de Oro academy in Bucaramanga, where she trained under Alexander Uribe. She took a series of jobs to support herself while she trained, working as a messenger, in a butcher's shop and in retail, and later with a Real Madrid foundation programme.

== Club career ==
=== Atlético Bucaramanga ===
Arias joined the senior squad of her home-city club Atlético Bucaramanga in 2017 and played for it across the 2017 and 2018 Liga Femenina seasons.

=== Independiente Medellín and Junior ===
She spent the 2019 season with Independiente Medellín and the 2020 season with Junior of Barranquilla.

=== América de Cali ===
Arias signed for América de Cali in 2021 and made ten league appearances in her first season, establishing herself as one of the division's leading defenders and earning a nomination for its defender of the year award. She anchored the central defence as América played the 2020 Copa Libertadores, staged in Argentina in March 2021, and was named in CONMEBOL's team of the tournament.

=== Pachuca ===
On 23 December 2021, Liga MX Femenil club Pachuca announced Arias's signing for the Clausura portion of the 2022 season; she and the Argentine midfielder Ruth Bravo filled the club's two foreign-player places. Arias made 23 appearances and scored once across the calendar year, and helped Pachuca reach the Clausura final, in which it finished as runners-up.

=== Return to América de Cali ===
Arias returned to América de Cali for 2023. She started all four of the club's matches at the 2023 Copa Libertadores, held in Colombia, and was again named in CONMEBOL's team of the tournament. América also reached the Liga Femenina final that year, losing 2–0 on aggregate to Independiente Santa Fe, with the deciding leg played at the Estadio Olímpico Pascual Guerrero.

=== Corinthians ===
On 6 January 2024, following her performances for Colombia at the 2023 FIFA Women's World Cup, Arias signed for Brazilian club Corinthians. International duty delayed her debut until after the 2024 CONCACAF W Gold Cup. She started the second leg of the Campeonato Brasileiro final on 22 September 2024, a 2–0 win over São Paulo that sealed a 5–1 aggregate victory and a sixth national title for the club. The following month she helped Corinthians win a fifth Copa Libertadores title. In December 2024 she was named the Bola de Prata winner as the Brazilian league's best centre back.

Arias made 25 appearances in all competitions for Corinthians before leaving in 2025. Her sale to the NWSL was reported as the third-highest outgoing transfer fee in Brazilian women's football, behind only those of Priscila and Tarciane.

=== San Diego Wave ===
Arias joined NWSL club San Diego Wave FC on 26 March 2025, signing a two-year deal with a mutual option. She did not appear for more than five months, making her debut as a late substitute for Perle Morroni in a 3–0 defeat to the Houston Dash in September 2025. She was an unused substitute as San Diego lost its play-off quarter-final to the Portland Thorns on 9 November. Having not played in the first half of the 2026 season, she left the club by mutual contract termination in June 2026.

=== Club León ===
In July 2026, Arias returned to the Liga MX Femenil, joining Club León as a free agent; the club presented her on 23 July.

== International career ==
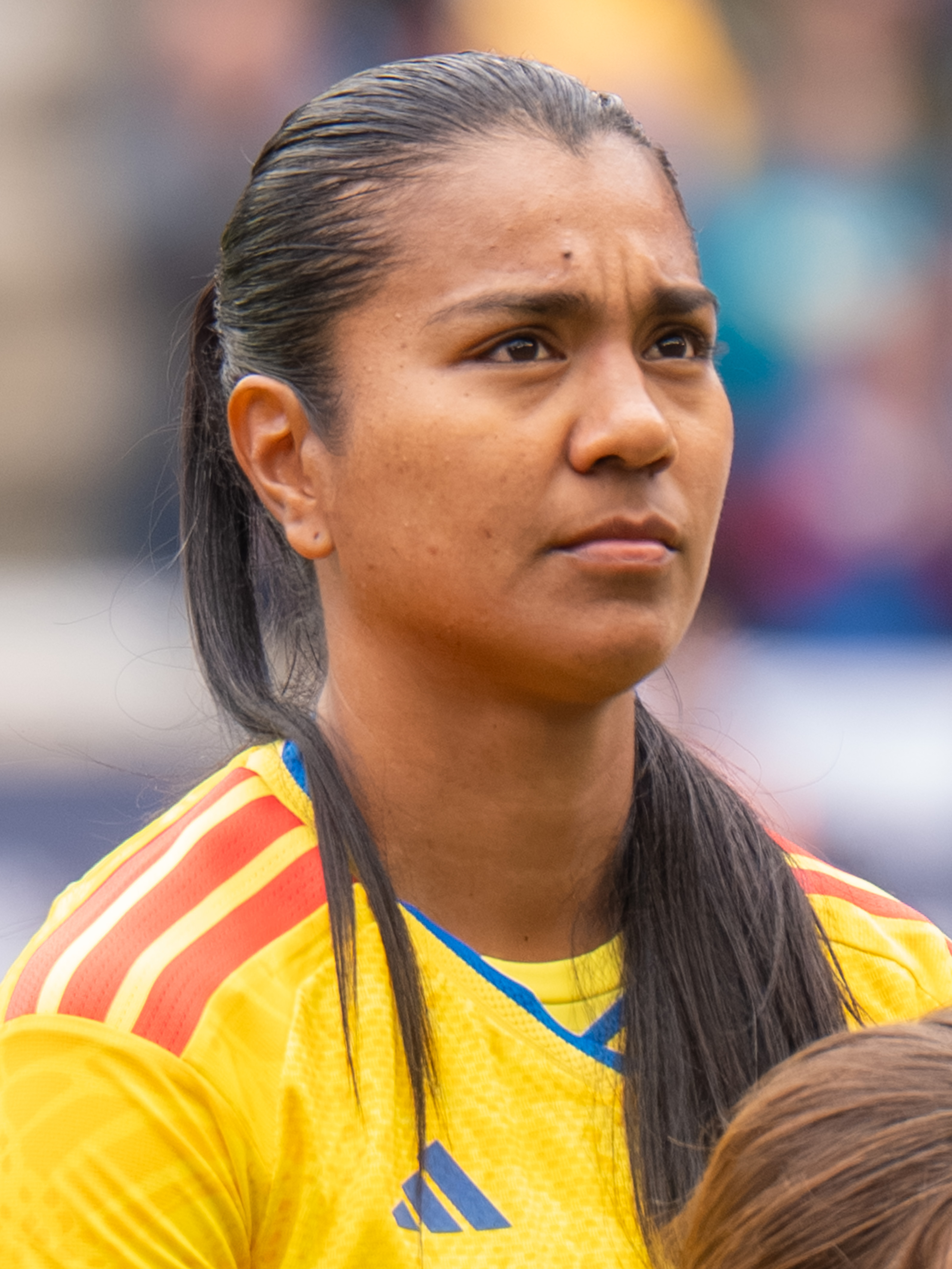
Arias with Colombia in 2026

Arias was called up to the Colombia squad for the 2018 Copa América Femenina, at which Colombia finished fourth. She was a member of the Colombia team that won the gold medal in the women's football tournament at the 2019 Pan American Games in Lima.

On 3 July 2022, Arias was named in the squad for the 2022 Copa América Femenina, held in Colombia, where the team finished as runners-up. She was called up for the 2023 FIFA Women's World Cup on 4 July 2023, and started consistently as Colombia reached the quarter-finals, where it lost to the eventual runners-up England.

Arias played at the 2024 CONCACAF W Gold Cup, and although knee trouble left her participation in doubt, she was named on 5 July 2024 in the squad for the 2024 Summer Olympics.

At the 2025 Copa América Femenina, Arias again helped Colombia reach the final, which Brazil won on penalties. The following year she was part of the side that won the inaugural CONMEBOL Women's Nations League, sealed with a 4–3 win over Paraguay at the Estadio Defensores del Chaco in Asunción on 10 June 2026; the result also secured Colombia automatic qualification for the 2027 FIFA Women's World Cup. Afterwards Arias said the squad had "made history" and dedicated the title to earlier generations of Colombian players.

== International goals ==
No.	Date	Venue	Opponent	Score	Result	Competition
1.	7 April 2023	Stade Gabriel Montpied, Clermont-Ferrand, France	France	1–0	2–5	Friendly

== Personal life ==
In 2019, Arias competed for the Santander team on the Colombian reality competition series Desafío Súper Regiones, broadcast by Caracol Televisión.

== Honours ==
Corinthians

- Campeonato Brasileiro de Futebol Feminino Série A1: 2024
- Copa Libertadores Femenina: 2024

Colombia

- CONMEBOL Women's Nations League: 2025–26
- Pan American Games gold medal: 2019
- Copa América Femenina runner-up: 2022, 2025

Individual

- Copa Libertadores Femenina team of the tournament: 2020, 2023
- Bola de Prata: 2024
