= 2025 Big Ten women's soccer tournament =

Postseason women's soccer tournament

- Classification: Division I
- Teams: 10
- Matches: 9
- Attendance: 3,374
- Quarterfinals site: Folk Field; West Lafayette, Indiana
- Semifinals site: Energizer Park; St. Louis, Missouri
- Finals site: Energizer Park; St. Louis, Missouri
- Champions: Washington (1st title)
- Winning coach: Nicole Van Dyke (1st title)
- MVP: Samiah Shell (Washington)
- Broadcast: BTN, B1G+

2025 Big Ten Conference women's soccer standings
	Conf.						Overall
Team	W		L		T	PCT	W		L		T	PCT
No. 6 Washington ‍†‍‡‍^{y}	8	–	1	–	2	.818	15	–	3	–	7	.740
No. 7 Michigan St ‍‍‍^{y}	7	–	1	–	3	.773	15	–	4	–	6	.720
No. 21 Iowa ‍‍‍^{y}	6	–	2	–	3	.682	12	–	5	–	4	.667
No. 22 UCLA ‍‍‍^{y}	6	–	2	–	3	.682	12	–	5	–	4	.667
No. 23 Wisconsin ‍‍‍^{y}	6	–	3	–	2	.636	14	–	6	–	2	.682
Illinois ‍‍‍^{y}	5	–	4	–	2	.545	13	–	6	–	2	.667
Penn St ‍‍‍^{y}	5	–	4	–	2	.545	10	–	8	–	3	.548
Northwestern ‍‍‍^{y}	4	–	2	–	5	.591	9	–	4	–	8	.619
No. 9т Ohio St ‍‍‍^{y}	4	–	2	–	5	.591	11	–	5	–	6	.636
USC ‍‍‍	4	–	5	–	2	.455	7	–	7	–	3	.500
Michigan ‍‍‍	3	–	4	–	4	.455	6	–	8	–	4	.444
Nebraska ‍‍‍	3	–	5	–	3	.409	8	–	5	–	5	.583
Indiana ‍‍‍	2	–	4	–	5	.409	5	–	6	–	6	.471
Purdue ‍‍‍	3	–	7	–	1	.318	6	–	10	–	3	.395
Minnesota ‍‍‍	2	–	6	–	3	.318	6	–	8	–	3	.441
Rutgers ‍‍‍	2	–	7	–	2	.273	4	–	7	–	5	.406
Maryland ‍‍‍	2	–	8	–	1	.227	6	–	11	–	1	.361
Oregon ‍‍‍	1	–	6	–	4	.273	3	–	10	–	5	.306
† – Conference champion ‡ – 2025 Big Ten Tournament champion y – Invited to the NCAA Tournament; As of December 9, 2025; Rankings from United Soccer Coaches Poll; Source:Big Ten

The 2025 Big Ten women's soccer tournament was the postseason women's soccer tournament for the Big Ten Conference held from October 30 through November 9, 2025. The tournament was hosted by Purdue University at Folk Field for the First Round and the Quarterfinals then at Energizer Park in St. Louis, Missouri for the Semifinals and Finals. The ten-team single-elimination tournament consisted of four rounds based on seeding from regular season conference play. UCLA were the defending champions. UCLA was unable to defend its title, falling to Michigan State in the semifinals. The Washington Huskies would go on to defeat Michigan State in a penalty shoot-out in the Final and complete the regular season and tournament double. The conference tournament title was the first for Washington and first Big Ten title for head coach Nicole Van Dyke. As tournament champions, Washington earned the Big Ten's automatic bid to the 2025 NCAA Division I women's soccer tournament.

== Seeding ==
The top ten teams in the regular season earned a spot in the tournament. Teams were seeded based on regular season conference records. A tiebreaker was required between Iowa and UCLA as both teams finished with 6–2–3 regular season conference records. UCLA won the regular season matchup between the two teams 3–0 on October 16, and was therefore the third seed. A four-team tiebreaker was required between Illinois, Northwestern, Ohio State, and Penn State as all four teams finished with seventeen conference points. Penn State won the tiebreaker and was the sixth seed, Northwestern was the seventh seed, Ohio State was the eighth seed, and Illinois was the ninth seed.

Seed	School	Conference	Points
1	Washington	8–1–2	26
2	Michigan State	7–1–3	24
3	UCLA	6–2–3	21
4	Iowa	6–2–3	21
5	Wisconsin	6–3–2	20
6	Penn State	5–4–2	17
7	Northwestern	4–2–5	17
8	Ohio State	4–2–5	17
9	Illinois	5–4–2	17
10	USC	4–5–2	14

== Bracket ==
1st Round; Friday, Oct 30
8	Ohio State	0
9	Illinois	1
7	Northwestern	1
10	USC	0

Quarterfinals; Saturday, Nov 1 Sunday, Nov 2
1	Washington	2
9	Illinois	0
4	Iowa	0
5	Wisconsin	3
2	Michigan State	1
7	Northwestern	0
3	UCLA	2
6	Penn State	1

Semifinals; Thursday, Nov 6
1	Washington	2
5	Wisconsin	1
2	Michigan State (a.e.t.)	2
3	UCLA	1

Final; Sunday, 9
1	Washington (pen.)	1 (4)
2	Michigan State	1 (1)

== Schedule ==
=== First Round ===
October 30	(8) Ohio State	0–1	(9) Illinois	West Lafayette, IN
4:30 p.m. EDT		Report	55', (yellow card) 89' Lia Howard	Stadium: Folk Field; Attendance: 157; Referee: Art Arustamyan; Assistant referees: Ryan Homik; Vasilios Vouris; Fourth official: Christopher Koloffon

October 30	(7) Northwestern	1–0	(10) USC	West Lafayette, IN
7:30 p.m. EDT	Megan Norkett 85'	Report	(yellow card) 25' Molly McDougal	Stadium: Folk Field; Attendance: 132; Referee: Shane Butler; Assistant referees: Besnik Rexhepi; Grace Barrett; Fourth official: Abdu Bensalah

=== Quarterfinals ===
November 1	(4) Iowa	0–3	(5) Wisconsin	West Lafayette, IN
4:30 p.m. EDT		Report	11' Adee Boer; 51' Brooke Allen; 74' Taylor Gordon	Stadium: Folk Field; Attendance: 382; Referee: Calin Radosav; Assistant referees: Brian Alvarez; Sao Kamara; Fourth official: William Delois

November 1	(3) UCLA	2–1	(6) Penn State	West Lafayette, IN
7:30 p.m. EDT	Bella Winn 62'; Jordan Geis 77'; Payten Cooper (yellow card) 82'	Report	26' Kaitlyn MacBean; (yellow card) 40' Team	Stadium: Folk Field; Attendance: 215; Referee: Cassidy Moulton; Assistant referees: Besnik Rexhepi; Peter Charpenter; Fourth official: Dana Hackney

November 2	(1) Washington	2–0	(9) Illinois	West Lafayette, IN
12:30 p.m. EST	Samiah Shell 8'; Alex Buck 39'	Report		Stadium: Folk Field; Attendance: 203; Referee: Youssef Elmessoussi; Assistant referees: Fernando Pina; Dana Hackney; Fourth official: Aaron Rawlins

November 2	(2) Michigan State	1–0	(7) Northwestern	West Lafayette, IN
3:30 p.m. EST	Renee Watson (yellow card) 70'; Kayla Briggs 73'	Report	(yellow card) 51' Kate Hennen	Stadium: Folk Field; Attendance: 365; Referee: John Kennedy; Assistant referees: Adam Herges; Sean West; Fourth official: Abdu Bensalah

=== Semifinals ===
November 6	(1) Washington	2–1	(5) Wisconsin	St. Louis, MO
4:00 p.m. EST	Samiah Shell 38', (yellow card) 88'; Maylen Montoya 39'; Enora Matté (yellow card) 78'; Maya Loudd (red card) 88'	Report	(yellow card) 34' Jenna Baumann; (red card) 50' Kiara Gilmore; (yellow card) 59' Anya Gulbrandsen; (yellow card) 78' Brooke Allen; (yellow card) 79' Hailey Baumann; 84' Adee Boer; (yellow card) 88' Jadea Collin	Stadium: Energizer Park; Attendance: 1,133; Referee: Nicole Green; Assistant referees: Cory Richardson; Braeden Frey; Fourth official: Velimir Milovic

November 6	(2) Michigan State	2–1 (a.e.t.)	(3) UCLA	St. Louis, MO
7:00 p.m. EST	Samantha Maroni (yellow card) 25'; Emerson Sargeant 67', 94'	Report	11' Emma Egizii; (yellow card) 71' Jennie Immethun	Stadium: Energizer Park; Referee: Erin Patterson; Assistant referees: Josh Few; Laura Snyder; Fourth official: Shane Butler

=== Final ===
November 9	(1) Washington	1–1 (a.e.t.) (4–1 p)	(2) Michigan State	St. Louis, MO
2:00 p.m. EST	Kalea Eichenberger 4'; Samiah Shell (yellow card) 86'	Report	11' (pen.) Kayla Briggs; (yellow card) 110' Sofia Beerworth	Stadium: Energizer Park; Attendance: 787; Referee: Adriana Contreras; Assistant referees: Morgan Abbitt; Audra Fullen; Fourth official: Nick Balcer
	Penalties
	Jadyn Holdenried (penalty scored); Laura Cetina (penalty scored); Alex Buck (penalty scored); Julia Hüsch (penalty scored)		(penalty missed) Maleeya Martin; (penalty scored) Kennedy Bell; (penalty missed) Kayla Briggs

== Statistics ==
=== Goalscorers ===
There were 19 goals scored in 9 matches, for an average of 2.11 goals per match (as of November 9, 2025).

2 goals

- Kayla Briggs – Michigan State
- Emerson Sargeant – Michigan State
- Samiah Shell – Washington
- Adee Boer – Wisconsin

1 goal

- Lia Howard – Illinois
- Megan Norkett – Northwestern
- Kaitlyn MacBean – Penn State
- Emma Egizii – UCLA
- Jordan Geis – UCLA
- Bella Winn – UCLA
- Alex Buck – Washington
- Kalea Eichenberger – Washington
- Maylen Montoya – Washington
- Brooke Allen – Wisconsin
- Taylor Gordon – Wisconsin

== All-Tournament team ==
Player	Team
Lia Howard	Illinois
Sofia Bush	Iowa
Emerson Sargeant	Michigan State
Megan Norkett	Northwestern
Ava Bramblett	Ohio State
Mackenzie Gress	Penn State
Emma Egizii	UCLA
Edra Bello	USC
Alex Buck	Washington
Tanner Ijams	Washington
**Samiah Shell**	Washington
Adee Boer	Wisconsin

MVP in bold
