= June Shelton School =

Shelton School

Location
- 17301 Preston Road; Dallas, Texas 75252; United States; 32.963312°N 96.785488°W

Information
- Other names: Shelton School; Shelton
- Type: Private school
- Motto: Engage, Enrich, Empower
- Established: 1976
- Founder: June Ford Shelton
- NCES School ID: 01914986
- Executive Director: Suzanne Stell
- Teaching staff: 177
- Grades: PK–12
- Gender: Co-educational
- Enrollment: 1,069 (2025–2026)
- Student to teacher ratio: 1:6
- Hours in school day: 7.5
- Colors: Blue and white
- Mascot: Charger
- Accreditation: Independent Schools Association of the Southwest (ISAS)
- Website: www.shelton.org

Shelton School (also known as The June Shelton School & Evaluation Center or simply Shelton) is a PK–12 co-educational private school in Dallas, Texas, United States. It was established in 1976 by June Ford Shelton to treat or accommodate students with learning differences (LD). It has grown into an international center for demonstration, resources, and research.

It provides access to Shelton organizations, including the Evaluation Center, Speech Clinic, and Outreach Center. Beginning in 2003, Shelton received research grants to help provide more answers for the LD population. The Early Intervention Program helps children with significant oral language disorders. Researchers are analyzing data on the most effective services. The Center for Advanced ADHD Research, Treatment and Education (CAARTE) is investigating subtypes of ADHD and non-medication treatments. This study is in collaboration with the University of Texas Southwestern Medical Center and UTD Center for BrainHealth.

As of October 2026, the tuition is from $21,700 to $42,800

== Notable alumni ==
- Trinity Byars (2021), NWSL soccer player
