= Kiki Pickett =

American soccer player (born 1999)

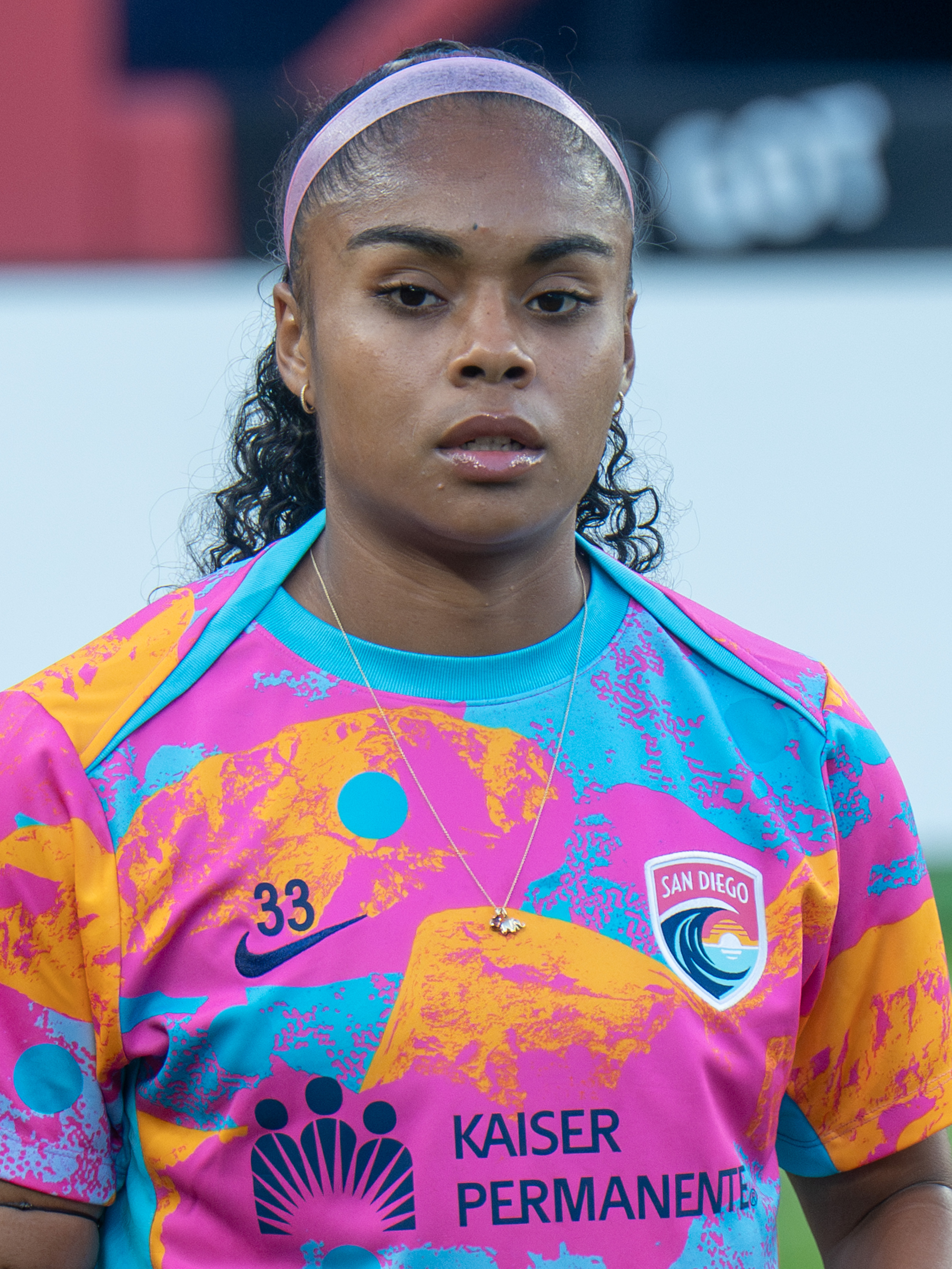
- Pickett with the San Diego Wave in 2026

Personal information
- Full name: Kiara Shaelene Pickett
- Date of birth: April 30, 1999 (age 27)
- Place of birth: Santa Barbara, California, United States
- Height: 5 ft 0 in (1.52 m)
- Positions: Midfielder; defender

Team information
- Current team: San Diego Wave
- Number: 33

Youth career
- 2011–2013: Santa Barbara SC
- 2014–2017: Eagles SC
- 2014–2017: Dos Pueblos High School

College career
| Years | Team | Apps | (Gls) |
| 2017–2021 | Stanford Cardinal | 81 | (5) |

Senior career*
| Years | Team | Apps | (Gls) |
| 2021 | Kansas City Current | 16 | (0) |
| 2022–2023 | North Carolina Courage | 13 | (0) |
| 2024–2025 | Bay FC | 39 | (3) |
| 2026– | San Diego Wave | 8 | (0) |

International career^{‡}
| 2014–2016 | United States U17 | | |
| 2015–2019 | United States U20 | | |
| 2019 | United States U23 | | |
- * Club domestic league appearances and goals as of 16:44, November 15, 2026 (UTC) ‡ National team caps and goals as of April 25, 2021

Kiara Shaelene "Kiki" Pickett (born April 30, 1999) is an American professional soccer player who plays as a midfielder or defender for San Diego Wave FC of the National Women's Soccer League (NWSL). She played college soccer for the Stanford Cardinal, winning the 2017 and 2019 national championships, and was drafted fourth overall by the Kansas City Current in the 2021 NWSL Draft. She also played for the North Carolina Courage and Bay FC.

== College career ==
Pickett played collegiately at Stanford University, where she helped the Cardinal win the Women's College Cup in 2017 and 2019. At the 2019 title game, she scored the winning penalty in the shootout against North Carolina. In April 2021, Pickett was named Pac-12 Conference Defensive Player of the Year for the 2020 season.

== Club career ==
Pickett was drafted fourth overall in the 2021 NWSL Draft by the Kansas City Current, who sent $175,000 in allocation money to Sky Blue FC (since renamed NJ/NY Gotham FC) in exchange for the draft pick. On May 18, 2021, Pickett signed a 3-year contract with Kansas City. She made her professional debut on June 26, 2021, coming on as a substitute in a 1–2 loss to the Washington Spirit.

In the offseason before 2022, Pickett was traded to the North Carolina Courage along with a No. 3 2022 NWSL Draft pick in exchange for Sam Mewis.

On January 21, 2024, Pickett signed a two-year deal with Bay FC. Across two seasons, she registered 39 appearances (31 starts), three goals, and one assist. She departed from Bay FC at the end of 2025 as a free agent.

On January 16, 2026, San Diego Wave FC signed Pickett to a two-year contract.

== Career statistics ==
=== Club ===
As of April 5, 2026

Appearances and goals by club, season and competition
| Club | Season | League | | | Cup (Note: Includes the NWSL Challenge Cup) | | Playoffs (Note: Includes NWSL playoffs) | | Other | | Total | |
| Club | Season | Division | Apps | Goals | Apps | Goals | Apps | Goals | Apps | Goals | Apps | Goals |
|---|---|---|---|---|---|---|---|---|---|---|---|---|
| Kansas City Current | 2021 | NWSL | 16 | 0 | 0 | 0 | — | | — | | 16 | 0 |
| North Carolina Courage | 2022 | NWSL | 4 | 0 | 5 | 0 | — | | — | | 9 | 0 |
| North Carolina Courage | 2023 | NWSL | 9 | 0 | 4 | 0 | 0 | 0 | — | | 13 | 0 |
| North Carolina Courage | Total | | 13 | 0 | 9 | 0 | 0 | 0 | 0 | 0 | 22 | 0 |
| Bay FC | 2024 | NWSL | 20 | 1 | — | | 1 | 0 | 3 (Note: Appearances in the NWSL x Liga MX Femenil Summer Cup) | 0 | 24 | 1 |
| Bay FC | 2025 | NWSL | 19 | 2 | — | | — | | — | | 19 | 2 |
| Bay FC | Total | | 39 | 3 | 0 | 0 | 1 | 0 | 3 | 0 | 43 | 3 |
| San Diego Wave FC | 2026 | NWSL | 4 | 0 | — | | — | | — | | 4 | 0 |
| Career total | | | 72 | 3 | 9 | 0 | 1 | 0 | 3 | 0 | 85 | 3 |

== Honors ==
Stanford Cardinal

- NCAA Division I women's soccer tournament: 2017, 2019
