= Trinity Byars =

American soccer player (born 2003)

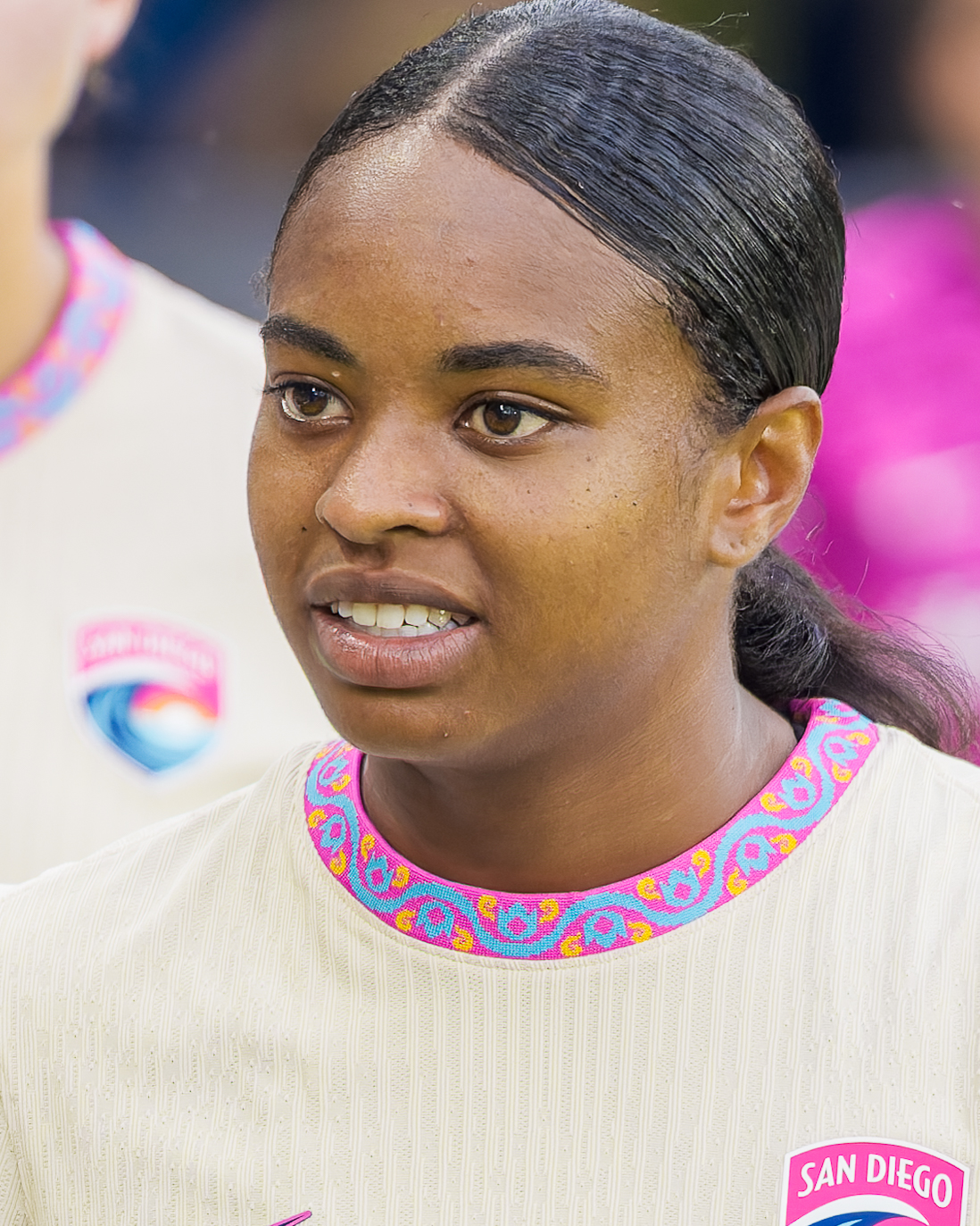
- Byars with the San Diego Wave in 2026

Personal information
- Full name: Trinity Paula Byars
- Date of birth: January 29, 2003 (age 23)
- Place of birth: Richardson, Texas, U.S.
- Height: 5 ft 5 in (1.65 m)
- Position: Forward

Team information
- Current team: San Diego Wave
- Number: 15

Youth career
- Solar SC

College career
Years	Team	Apps	(Gls)
2021–2024	Texas Longhorns	67	(47)

Senior career*
Years	Team	Apps	(Gls)
2025–	San Diego Wave	25	(11)

International career
2018	United States U-16		
2018–2019	United States U-17	8	(2)
2019	United States U-18	2	(0)
2022	United States U-20	12	(3)
2023	United States U-23		
- * Club domestic league appearances and goals as of 16:39, November 15, 2026 (UTC)

Trinity Paula Byars (born January 29, 2003) is an American professional soccer player who plays as a forward for San Diego Wave FC of the National Women's Soccer League (NWSL). She played college soccer for the Texas Longhorns, earning All-American honors twice. She represented the United States at the 2018 FIFA U-17 Women's World Cup and the 2022 FIFA U-20 Women's World Cup.

== Early life ==
Byars was born and raised in the Dallas suburb of Richardson, Texas, one of five siblings born to Agatha and Charles Byars. One of her sisters, Tatyana, played for the Texas Longhorns soccer team for one season. Byars began playing soccer when she was four and joined Solar SC alongside future Longhorns teammate Lexi Missimo at age five. They led the team to win the USYS national under-13 championship in 2016 and the USSDA under-16/17 championship in 2019. Considered two of the top recruits of the class of 2021, they both committed to Texas when they were in seventh grade. Byars had offers to go pro out of high school from foreign clubs including Atlético Madrid, having trained with Atlético and Manchester City in the summer of 2019. She attended June Shelton School in Dallas, where she played basketball and ran track.

== College career ==
Byars led the Texas Longhorns with 12 goals as a freshman in 2021, earning Big 12 Conference all-freshman and All-Big 12 second-team honors. She led the Big 12 Conference with 17 goals as a sophomore in 2022, helping the Longhorns win the conference regular-season title, and was named the Big 12 Offensive Player of the Year, first-team All-Big 12, and first-team United Soccer Coaches All-American. She scored 18 goals as a junior in 2023, as the Longhorns won the Big 12 tournament, and was named first-team All-Big 12 and second-team All-American. She scored her 47th career goal during the NCAA tournament in 2023, passing Kelly McDonald for the program scoring record (and was surpassed by Missimo one year later). She scored five goals in five games as a senior in 2024 before suffering a season-ending knee injury. She ended her college career with 52 goals and 36 assists in 71 games.

== Club career ==
San Diego Wave FC announced on November 7, 2024, that the club had signed Byars to her first professional contract on a two-year deal through 2026, with the option for another year. She was the first NCAA player signed after the abolition of the annual NWSL Draft. Because of her ACL injury at Texas, she spent most of her rookie season on the season-ending injury list. Following her recovery, Byars made the bench for the Wave's regular-season finale on November 2, 2025. The following week, she made her professional debut in the playoff quarterfinals against the Portland Thorns, coming on as an extra-time substitute for Dudinha in the season-ending 1–0 loss.

On April 25, 2026, Byars made her NWSL regular-season debut in a 3–2 win over expansion team Denver Summit. On May 15, she scored her first professional goal in her first start for San Diego, opening a 2–1 victory over the Washington Spirit. On July 9, having scored four goals in the last five games, she signed a new three-year contract with the Wave through 2028. On August 21, she scored two goals and assisted the remaining two in a 4–2 victory over the Utah Royals. The following week, she again scored twice in a 3–2 win over Racing Louisville and was named NWSL Player of the Week. In doing so, she became the Wave's second-ever double-digit goal scorer in a season, joining Alex Morgan (2022).

== International career ==
Byars began training with the United States youth national team at the under-14 level in 2016. After playing in a friendly tournament for the under-16 team, she was the youngest player included on the under-17 roster at the 2018 FIFA U-17 Women's World Cup. For her club performance, she was nominated for U.S. Soccer Young Female Player of the Year in 2019. She helped the under-20 team win the 2022 CONCACAF Women's U-20 Championship and 2022 Sud Ladies Cup, where she was the tournament's top scorer. She started all three games for the United States at the 2022 FIFA U-20 Women's World Cup, assisting on a goal against Ghana. She played friendlies for the under-23 team in 2023.

In September 2026, Byars was called into the senior national team for the first time by head coach Emma Hayes.

== Career statistics ==
As of July 18, 2026

Appearances and goals by club, season and competition
Club	Season	League			Playoffs (Note: Includes NWSL Playoffs)		Total	
Club	Season	Division	Apps	Goals	Apps	Goals	Apps	Goals
San Diego Wave FC	2025	NWSL	0	0	1	0	1	0
San Diego Wave FC	2026	NWSL	11	6	—		11	6
Career total			11	6	1	0	12	6

== Honors and awards ==
Texas Longhorns

- Big 12 Conference women's soccer tournament: 2023
- SEC women's soccer tournament: 2024

United States U-20

- CONCACAF Women's U-20 Championship: 2022

Individual

- First-team All-American: 2022
- Second-team All-American: 2023
- Big 12 Offensive Player of the Year: 2022
- Big 12 Forward of the Year: 2023
- First-team All-Big 12: 2022, 2023
- Second-team All-Big 12: 2021
- Big 12 tournament all-tournament team: 2021, 2022, 2023
