= Caroline Putz =

American soccer player (born 1980)

Personal information
- Full name: Caroline Roseland Leith
- Birth name: Caroline Roseland Putz
- Date of birth: July 12, 1980 (age 46)
- Place of birth: Salt Lake City, Utah, U.S.
- Height: 5 ft 7 in (1.70 m)
- Position: Forward

Youth career
- –1997: Bountiful Braves

College career
Years	Team	Apps	(Gls)
1998–2001	Washington Huskies	78	(22)

International career
- United States U21
2000	United States	1	(1)

Managerial career
- 2003: Utah State Aggies (assistant)

Caroline Roseland Leith (née Putz; born July 12, 1980) is an American former soccer player who played as a forward, for the United States women's national team. A longtime member of the United States Women's Youth National Soccer Team, she played on the U-16, U-18, U-20, and U-21 teams. Recognized as the first player from the State of Utah to earn a cap for participation in an international contest. She was the Utah Female Athlete of the Year (1997), Utah State Player of the Year (1996, 1997), Umbro All-American (1996, 1997), Parade All-American (1996, 1997), and the Utah State University Graduate Assistant Coach (2003-2005). She scored 100 goals in 39 games for Bountiful High School. She also played for the Seattle Sounders women's semi-professional team. Caroline and her husband, Galen Leith, live in Colorado with their three kids.

== Career ==
Putz played for the Bountiful Braves in high school, where she helped the team win the 1996 state championship and was selected as the 1997 Utah Female Athlete of the Year. She was included in the All-State selection from 1995 to 1997, and was a two-time Umbro and Parade High-School All-American. In college, she played for the Washington Huskies from 1998 to 2001. She was included in the NSCAA All-Region third team in 2000, and was included in the Pac-12 All-Conference second team in 1998 and 2000. Putz also was included in the Soccer Buzz All-Freshman West Region first team in 1998, as well as an honorable mention for Freshman All-American. She was chosen as the team's offensive MVP in 2001, and was an honorable mention for the Pac-12 All-Academic Team in 1999, 2000, and 2001. In total, she scored 22 goals and recorded 27 assists in 78 appearances for the Huskies. She ranks fifth in career goals and points (71, calculated with goals and assists) at the school, and second in career assists.

Putz played for the U.S. under-21 national team. She made her only international appearance for the United States on July 7, 2000, in a friendly match against Italy. She came on as a substitute in the 86th minute for Susan Bush, scoring in stoppage time to extend the U.S. lead, with the match finishing as a 4–1 win.

Putz later began coaching, working as an assistant for the Utah State Aggies in 2003. She also worked as a trainer for Cottonwood Football Club.

== Personal life ==
Putz was born in Salt Lake City, Utah, though she grew up in Bountiful. She now uses the surname Leith.

== Career statistics ==
=== International ===
United States
Year	Apps	Goals
2000	1	1
Total	1	1

=== International goals ===
No.	Date	Location	Opponent	Score	Result	Competition
1	July 7, 2000	Central Islip, New York, United States	Italy	4–1	4–1	Friendly
