= Kayla Briggs =

Canadian soccer player (born 2005)

Personal information
- Full name: Kayla Angela Briggs
- Date of birth: June 5, 2005 (age 21)
- Place of birth: Toronto, Canada
- Height: 1.65 m (5 ft 5 in)
- Position: Midfielder

Team information
- Current team: Michigan State Spartans
- Number: 9

Youth career
- 2009–2017: Leaside SC
- 2017–2021: North Toronto Nitros
- 2022–2023: NDC Ontario

College career
Years	Team	Apps	(Gls)
2023–2024	Providence Friars	26	(5)
2025–	Michigan State Spartans	22	(7)

Senior career*
Years	Team	Apps	(Gls)
2022–2023	NDC Ontario	25	(9)

International career^{‡}
2022	Canada U17	3	(0)
2023–2024	Canada U20	11	(9)
2025–	Canada	3	(0)
- * Club domestic league appearances and goals as of January 6, 2025 ‡ National team caps and goals as of June 27, 2025

Kayla Angela Briggs (born July 5, 2005) is a Canadian soccer player.

== Early life ==
Briggs was born on July 5, 2005, in Toronto. She began playing youth soccer at age four with Leaside SC, playing with them until age 12. She then joined the North Toronto Nitros, before joining the NDC Ontario in January 2022. She also played with Team Ontario at the 2022 Canada Summer Games, where she won gold with the team.

== College career ==
In 2023, Briggs began attending Providence College where she played for the women's soccer team. On August 17, 2023, she made her collegiate debut, recording two assists in a 2-0 victory over the Iona Gaels On August 31, 2023, she scored her first collegiate goal in a 1-0 victory over the Brown Bears, earning Big East Freshman of the Week honours. In November 2023, she was named the Big East Offensive Player of the Week. At the end of the season, she was named to the All-Big East Second Team. Ahead of the 2024 season, she was named to the Big East All-Preseason team, and at the end of the season was named to the All-Big East Second Team.

== Club career ==
In 2022 and 2023, Briggs played with NDC Ontario in League1 Ontario.

== International career ==
Briggs was born in Canada, to a Canadian father and Zimbabwean mother.

Briggs made her debut in the Canadian national program, being named to the Canada U17 team for the U17 Revelations Cup in Mexico. She was then subsequently named to the squad for the 2022 FIFA U-17 Women's World Cup.

Briggs was later named to the Canada U20 team for various camps, as well as the 2023 CONCACAF Women's U-20 Championship and the 2024 FIFA U-20 Women's World Cup.

On April 8, 2025, Briggs made her senior debut, starting in a friendly against Argentina.
