= Kolo Suliafu =

American soccer player (born 2003)

Personal information
- Full name: Kolo Kiholeva Suliafu
- Date of birth: December 8, 2003 (age 22)
- Place of birth: Montclair, California, U.S.
- Height: 5 ft 5 in (1.65 m)
- Position: Center back

Team information
- Current team: Kansas City Current
- Number: 44

College career
| Years | Team | Apps | (Gls) |
| 2022–2025 | Washington Huskies | 81 | (1) |

Senior career*
| Years | Team | Apps | (Gls) |
| 2026– | Kansas City Current | 1 | (0) |

International career
| 2020 | United States U-17 | | |
| 2022 | United States U-20 | | |
- * Club domestic league appearances and goals as of July 29, 2026

Kolo Kiholeva Suliafu (born December 8, 2003) is an American professional soccer player who plays as a center back for the Kansas City Current of the National Women's Soccer League (NWSL). She played college soccer for the Washington Huskies, earning second-team All-American honors in 2025.

== Early life ==
Suliafu was born in Montclair, California, the daughter of Jennifer and Haumono Suliafu, and has seven siblings. She is of Tongan, Hawaiian, and New Zealand descent. She grew up in Victorville and Ontario, California. She first attended Oak Hills High School, winning the CIF-SS Division 3 title as a freshman forward in 2019, and was named first-team All-CIF twice. She later attended Upland High School. She played club soccer for So Cal Blues, earning multiple ECNL all-conference honors and winning the ECNL under-16 national title in 2019. She committed to play college soccer for Washington in her junior year.

== College career ==
Suliafu played for the Washington Huskies from 2022 to 2025, playing in 81 games with 71 starts and scoring 1 goal. She was named second-team All-Big Ten after starting all 21 games and leading the team in minutes played as a junior in 2024, helping the Huskies reach the Big Ten tournament semifinals. She had a decorated season as a senior in 2025, starting 23 games and contributing to a program record 12 clean sheets. She helped lead Washington to their first Big Ten regular-season and conference titles and reached the NCAA tournament quarterfinals for the third time in program history. She was named second-team All-American, first-team All-Big Ten, and the Big Ten Defender of the Year.

== Club career ==
On December 16, 2025, the Kansas City Current announced that they had signed Suliafu to her first professional contract on a one-year deal. Seven months later, she made her professional debut on July 29, 2026, as a 65th-minute substitute for Izzy Rodriguez in a 5–1 win over Racing Louisville.

== International career ==
Suliafu was called into training camps with the United States under-17 team leading up to the 2020 CONCACAF Women's U-17 Championship, but the tournament was eventually cancelled due to the COVID-19 pandemic. She was called up to friendlies with the under-20 team in 2022.

== Honors and awards ==
Washington Huskies

- Big Ten Conference: 2025
- Big Ten Conference tournament: 2025

Kansas City Current

- NWSL Championship: 2026

Individual

- Second-team All-American: 2025
- Big Ten Defender of the Year: 2025
- First-team All-Big Ten: 2025
- Second-team All-Big Ten: 2024
