= 2026 NWSL Challenge Cup =

- Event: NWSL Challenge Cup
Gotham FC	Kansas City Current
2	0
- Date: June 26, 2026
- Venue: ScottsMiracle-Gro Field, Columbus, Ohio

The 2026 NWSL Challenge Cup was the seventh edition of the NWSL Challenge Cup, a women's soccer competition organized by the National Women's Soccer League (NWSL). The match was the third Challenge Cup to be played in the super cup format as a one-off game. It featured Gotham FC, champions of the 2025 National Women's Soccer League, and the Kansas City Current, 2025 NWSL Shield winners. The match was played on June 26, 2026 (having originally been originally announced for February 20, 2026), and was held at ScottsMiracle-Gro Field in Columbus, Ohio, home of the Columbus Crew, an MLS team. It was the first time the NWSL has played in Columbus. A month after the announcement of the match being moved to Columbus, the NWSL awarded the city with an expansion team.

Gotham defeated the Current 2–0, with goals from Esther González and Jordynn Dudley in the 37th and 79th minutes, respectively.

== Teams ==
Team	Qualification	Previous final appearances (bold indicates winners)
Gotham FC	2025 NWSL champions	2 (2021, 2024)
Kansas City Current	2025 NWSL Shield winners	none

== Match ==
=== Details ===
June 26, 2026
8:00 pm EDT

Gotham FC	2–0	Kansas City Current
González 37' (pen.); Dudley 79'	Report

ScottsMiracle-Gro Field, Columbus, Ohio
Attendance: 11,369
Referee: Brad Jensen
