= Tatum Wynalda =

American soccer player (born 2004)

- Wynalda with the San Diego Wave in 2026

Personal information
- Full name: Tatum Milan Wynalda
- Date of birth: October 19, 2004 (age 22)
- Place of birth: Thousand Oaks, California, United States
- Height: 5 ft 5 in (1.65 m)
- Positions: Winger; fullback

Team information
- Current team: San Diego Wave
- Number: 19

Youth career
- 2009–2022: LAFC So Cal Youth
- 2020–2022: Westlake Warriors

College career
Years	Team	Apps	(Gls)
2022–2025	Pepperdine Waves	79	(23)

Senior career*
Years	Team	Apps	(Gls)
2026–	San Diego Wave	18	(0)
- * Club domestic league appearances and goals as of 16:45, November 15, 2026 (UTC)

Tatum Milan Wynalda (born October 19, 2004) is an American professional soccer player who plays as a winger or fullback for San Diego Wave FC of the National Women's Soccer League (NWSL). She played college soccer for the Pepperdine Waves. The daughter of National Soccer Hall of Famer Eric Wynalda, she is the first NWSL player to have a father who played in Major League Soccer (MLS).

== Early life ==
Wynalda was born and raised in Thousand Oaks, California. She began playing soccer in the AYSO when she was young. She went on to spend 13 years with LAFC So Cal Youth. When the U.S. Soccer Development Academy (DA) ended in 2020, she was able to join her high school team at Westlake High School for her junior and senior seasons. In her junior year, she scored 20 goals with 11 assists in 15 games and was named the Marmonte League Offensive MVP and earned first-team All-CIF Southern Section honors in 2021. She was also named ECNL all-conference with So Cal Youth in 2021.

Wynalda helped lead Westlake to the Marmonte League title in her senior year in 2022, scoring 28 goals with 9 assists in 17 games. She was named the league MVP, the Ventura County Star Player of the Year, and the Los Angeles Daily News Player of the Year. She was recruited by USC, Texas, Long Beach State, and Portland before committing to play college soccer for the Pepperdine Waves in her junior year. She had grown up around the Pepperdine team, which her maternal uncle Tim Ward coached, and was a fan of Waves alumnae Lynn Williams and Brianna Visalli.

== College career ==
Wynalda played in all 18 games, starting 8, and scored 8 goals (second on the team) for the Pepperdine Waves as a freshman in 2022, earning a place on the All-West Coast Conference (WCC) second team. The following spring, she was unable to practice due to stress fractures in her back, which had started in high school. She returned to the field as a sophomore in 2023, scoring 6 goals with 2 assists in 20 games. She was again named second-team All-WCC and helped the Waves place second in the conference and earn an NCAA tournament berth after a year's absence.

Wynalda became a regular starter in her junior year in 2024, scoring 4 goals with 4 assists in 21 games. She was named second-team All-WCC for the third time and helped the Waves win a share of the WCC title for the first time in seven years. In her senior year in 2025, she scored 5 goals and led the Waves with 10 assists in 20 games, garnering first-team All-WCC honors. She helped lead the Waves to their second-ever outright WCC title and their third consecutive NCAA tournament appearance.

== Club career ==
Wynalda joined the San Diego Wave as a non-roster invitee in the NWSL preseason in January 2026. She trained with the Portland Thorns later in the month, before playing for the Wave in the Coachella Valley Invitational. In early March, the Wave signed Wynalda to her first professional contract on an injury replacement deal through April. She made her professional debut as a late substitute for Perle Morroni in a season-opening 1–0 loss to the Houston Dash, becoming the first Major League Soccer (MLS) player's daughter to play in the NWSL. In July, she signed a new injury replacement contract through the end of the season, and two months later, she signed a one-year extension with the club through 2027.

== Personal life ==
Wynalda is the third of six children born to National Soccer Hall of Famer Eric Wynalda. Both her father and her mother, Amy Ward, played college soccer for the San Diego State Aztecs. Her uncle Tim Ward was her head coach at Pepperdine.

== Honors and awards ==
Pepperdine Waves

- West Coast Conference: 2024, 2025

Individual

- First-team All-WCC: 2025
- Second-team All-WCC: 2022, 2023, 2024
