= Mimi Van Zanten =

Jamaican-American soccer player (born 2005)

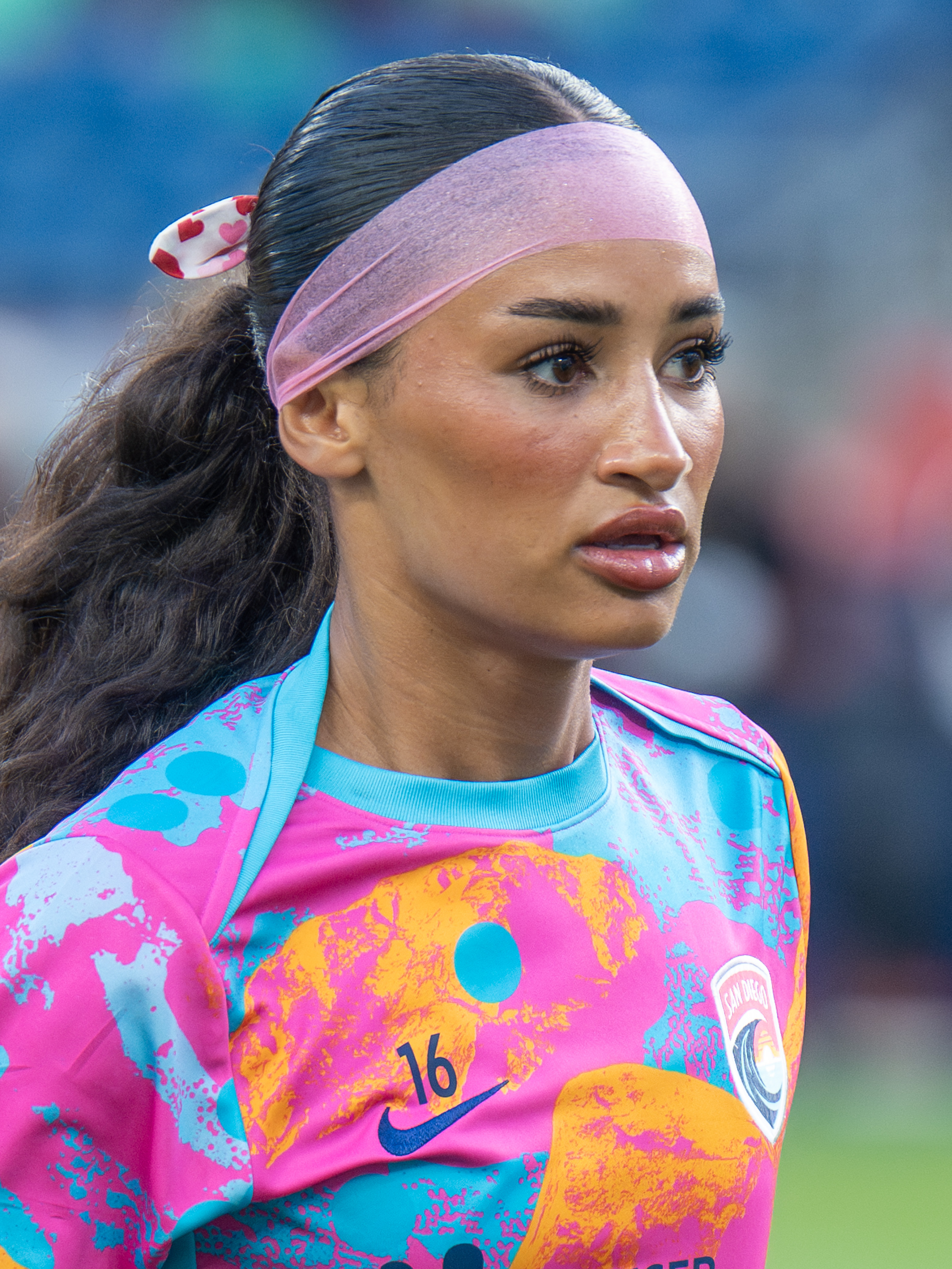
- Van Zanten with the San Diego Wave in 2026

Personal information
- Full name: Amelia Donna Van Zanten
- Date of birth: 25 January 2005 (age 21)
- Height: 5 ft 5 in (1.65 m)
- Position: Fullback

Team information
- Current team: San Diego Wave
- Number: 16

Youth career
- Chicago FC United
- Eclipse Select

College career
| Years | Team | Apps | (Gls) |
| 2023–2025 | Florida State Seminoles | 57 | (5) |

Senior career*
| Years | Team | Apps | (Gls) |
| 2026– | San Diego Wave | 29 | (2) |

International career^{‡}
| 2018 | United States U15 | | |
| 2023 | Jamaica U20 | 3 | (1) |
| 2024– | Jamaica | 4 | (0) |
- * Club domestic league appearances and goals as of 1 November 2026 ‡ National team caps and goals as of 29 June 2025

Amelia Donna Van Zanten (born 25 January 2005) is a professional footballer who plays as a fullback for San Diego Wave FC of the National Women's Soccer League (NWSL). Born in the United States, she plays for the Jamaica national team. She played college soccer for the Florida State Seminoles, winning two national championships (2023 and 2025). She is the sister of soccer player Kiki Van Zanten.

== Early life ==
Van Zanten grew up in Buffalo Grove, Illinois. She began playing soccer at age two and also played other sports including gymnastics and basketball. She attended Stevenson High School, where she was named the conference player of the year in 2022. She played club soccer for Chicago FC United before joining Eclipse Select SC, where she helped win the ECNL under-18/19 national championship in 2021. She committed to Florida State shortly before head coach Mark Krikorian stepped down and was replaced by Brian Pensky, but she remained committed to the program.

== College career ==
Van Zanten played in all 23 games for the Florida State Seminoles as a freshman in 2023, starting 13 and earning Atlantic Coast Conference (ACC) all-freshman honors. She scored her first college goal in the dying seconds against No. 1-ranked North Carolina, saving the team's undefeated record with a 3–3 draw. She started every round in the NCAA tournament and helped keep clean sheets through the first five games. In the final, she had an assist to Beata Olsson as the Seminoles won 5–1 against Stanford, capping an undefeated season with the program's fourth national title.

In her sophomore year in 2024, Van Zanten scored a career-high 4 goals in 21 games, starting 20, and earned third-team All-ACC honors. Florida State won their fifth consecutive ACC tournament and earned a one seed in the NCAA tournament but were upset in the second round on penalties.

Van Zanten returned for her junior year in 2025, playing in 19 games with 18 starts and scoring 1 goal, and was named third-team All-ACC for the second time, though she missed several games with a broken toe. In the NCAA tournament, she had a goal and assist against Georgetown in the third round and played a complete match in the 1–0 shutout win over the nation's top offense in Stanford in the final, winning her second national championship. After her junior season, she announced that she would give up her remaining college eligibility and turn pro.

== Club career ==
On 29 December 2025, the NWSL's San Diego Wave announced the signing of Van Zanten to her first professional contract on a two-year deal with options to extend another two years. She made her professional debut on 14 March 2026, starting in a season-opening 1–0 loss to her sister's Houston Dash. Though she mostly played left back in college, she moved to right back for the Wave as Perle Morroni was established on the left side. She scored her first professional goal on 9 May, heading the 2–1 winner against state rivals Angel City. On 22 October, she signed a new long-term contract committing to the Wave through 2029. She finished her strong rookie season with 30 appearances and 2 goals in all competitions. San Diego placed second in the league but was upset 1–0 by the Utah Royals in the playoff quarterfinals.

== International career ==
Van Zanten trained with the United States youth national team from the under-14 to under-17 level. She was one of the youngest players selected to the under-15 squad that won the 2018 CONCACAF Girls' U-15 Championship.

Van Zanten represented Jamaica at the 2023 CONCACAF Women's U-20 Championship, scoring one goal in a 4–1 win over Panama in the group stage. She received her first call-up to Jamaica's senior team in May 2024. She made her senior international debut for Jamaica on 4 June 2024, coming on as a second-half replacement for Florida State teammate Jody Brown in a 4–0 friendly loss to Brazil.

Van Zanten was called into training camp with the United States under-23 team, practicing alongside the senior national team, in March 2025. Two months later, she played for Jamaica in a senior friendly against the United States on 3 June 2025, starting in a 4–0 loss.

== Personal life ==
Van Zanten is one of three daughters born to Priscilla and Kent Van Zanten. Her father played college football at Illinois Wesleyan; her sister Brianna played college soccer for Case Western Reserve; and her sister Kiki played for Notre Dame before being drafted by the Houston Dash.

== Honors and awards ==
Florida State Seminoles

- NCAA Division I women's soccer tournament: 2023, 2025
- ACC women's soccer tournament: 2023, 2024

United States U15

- CONCACAF Girls' Under-15 Championship: 2018

Individual

- Third-team All-ACC: 2024, 2025
- ACC all-freshman team: 2023
- NWSL Best XI First Team: 2026
