= Washington Huskies women's soccer =

American college soccer team

- Founded: 1991; 35 years ago
- University: University of Washington
- Athletic director: Patrick Chun
- Head coach: Nicole Van Dyke (7th season)
- Conference: Big Ten
- Location: Seattle, Washington, US
- Stadium: Husky Soccer Stadium (capacity: 2,200)
- Nickname: Huskies
- Colors: Purple and gold
Home	Away

NCAA tournament Quarterfinals
- 2004, 2010, 2025

NCAA tournament Round of 16
- 2000, 2004, 2010, 2014, 2020, 2025

NCAA tournament Round of 32
- 1994, 1995, 2000, 2001, 2004, 2008, 2009, 2010, 2014, 2019, 2020, 2024, 2025

NCAA tournament appearances
- 1994, 1995, 1996, 1998, 2000, 2001, 2003, 2004, 2008, 2009, 2010, 2012, 2014, 2015, 2019, 2020, 2024, 2025, 2026

Conference tournament championships
- 2025

Conference regular season championships
- 2000, 2025

The University of Washington Huskies women's soccer team is who represents the University of Washington in the Big Ten Conference of NCAA Division I soccer. Their home games are played at Husky Soccer Stadium, located on the University of Washington's campus in Seattle.

== Players ==
=== Current roster ===
As of November 2026

Note: Flags indicate national team as defined under FIFA eligibility rules; some limited exceptions apply. Players may hold more than one non-FIFA nationality.

No.	Pos.	Nation	Player
0	GK	USA	Malie Chamberland
1	GK	USA	Tanner Ijams
2	MF	USA	Anna Menti
3	MF	BEL	Enora Matté
4	DF	USA	Maya Loudd
5	DF	USA	Sophie Blake
6	FW	USA	Ryan Boehm
7	FW	USA	Angelica Chou
8	MF	USA	Ava Morton
9	FW	USA	Summer Murphy
10	MF	USA	Andrea Leyva
11	FW	USA	Mary Camp Newton
12	MF	USA	Maylen Montoya
13	MF	USA	Samiah Shell
14	DF	USA	Elle Durham

No.	Pos.	Nation	Player
15	FW	USA	Alex Buck
16	FW	NZL	Grace Duncan
17	MF	USA	Jadyn Holdenried
18	MF	USA	Vanessa Aguilar
19	DF	USA	Taylor Thomas
20	DF	USA	Payton Norman
21	DF	USA	Ava De Filippo
22	DF	USA	MacKenzie Stearns
23	MF	USA	Lucy Newlin
24	FW	USA	Maggie Dutra
27	DF	USA	Cecelia Egan
28	MF	USA	Gracie Gouran
30	FW	USA	Avery Nguyen
33	GK	USA	Rylie Hurst
99	GK	USA	Rory Murry

== Statistics ==
=== All-time record ===
Source: 2011-12 Women's soccer record book

Source: Washington Huskies Women's Soccer Archive

Year	Head coach	Overall	Conf Rec	Conference
1991	Dang Pibulvech	10-6-2		Pac-10
1992	Dang Pibulvech	8-9-2		Pac-10
1993	Dang Pibulvech	9-6-2		Pac-10
1994	Lesle Gallimore	13-6-2		Pac-10
1995	Lesle Gallimore	12-8-0		Pac-10
1996	Lesle Gallimore	12-8-0		Pac-10
1997	Lesle Gallimore	7-12-0		Pac-10
1998	Lesle Gallimore	10-9-1		Pac-10
1999	Lesle Gallimore	8-8-2	5-2-2 (5th)	Pac-10
2000	Lesle Gallimore	18-3-0	8-1-0 (1st)	Pac-10
2001	Lesle Gallimore	13-5-2	6-2-1 (2nd, tie)	Pac-10
2002	Lesle Gallimore	9-8-3	4-4-1 (5th)	Pac-10
2003	Lesle Gallimore	11-7-3	4-4-1 (5th)	Pac-10
2004	Lesle Gallimore	17-5-1	5-3-1 (3rd)	Pac-10
2005	Lesle Gallimore	0-17-3	0-9-0 (10th)	Pac-10
2006	Lesle Gallimore	7-12-1	2-6-1 (9th)	Pac-10
2007	Lesle Gallimore	5-13-1	2-6-1 (7th, tie)	Pac-10
2008	Lesle Gallimore	15-6-1	5-3-1 (3rd, tie)	Pac-10
2009	Lesle Gallimore	12-6-4	3-3-3 (5th, tie)	Pac-10
2010	Lesle Gallimore	13-9-2	4-5-0 (5th, tie)	Pac-10
2011	Lesle Gallimore	7-8-5	3-5-3	Pac-12
2012	Lesle Gallimore	10-6-3	3-5-2	Pac-12
2013	Lesle Gallimore	7-9-4	3-4-3	Pac-12
2014	Lesle Gallimore	14-7-2	5-4-2	Pac-12
2015	Lesle Gallimore	12-7-2	5-5-1	Pac-12
2016	Lesle Gallimore	7-12-1	2-9-0	Pac-12
2017	Lesle Gallimore	9-8-3	2-6-3	Pac-12
2018	Lesle Gallimore	8-10-1	3-8-0	Pac-12
2019	Lesle Gallimore	12-7-2	7-4-0	Pac-12
2020	Nicole Van Dyke	10-4-4	5-3-3	Pac-12
2021	Nicole Van Dyke	6-8-4	4-4-3	Pac-12
2022	Nicole Van Dyke	10-6-3	4-6-1	Pac-12
2023	Nicole Van Dyke	9-5-5	4-3-3	Pac-12
2024	Nicole Van Dyke	10-7-4	7-4-0	Big Ten
2025	Nicole Van Dyke	15-3-7	8-1-2	Big Ten
2026	Nicole Van Dyke	12-3-4	7-2-3	Big Ten

== Individual honors ==
National Soccer Coaches Association (NSCAA) Coach of the Year (West Region):

- Lesle Gallimore – 2000

NSCAA Assistant Coach of the Year:

- Amy Griffin – 2004

Big Ten Coach of the Year:

- Nicole Van Dyke – 2025

Hermann Award Nominee:

- Kate Deines – 2011
- Hope Solo – 2001–2002

NSCAA/United Soccer Coaches All-American:

- Kolo Suliafu – 2025 (2nd)
- Alex Buck – 2025 (4th)
- Summer Yates – 2020 (2nd)
- Tina Frimpong – 2004
- Hope Solo – 2000–2001
- Melanie Brennan – 1993

NSCAA/United Soccer Coaches All-Region:

- Alex Buck – 2025 (1st)
- Kolo Suliafu – 2025 (1st)
- Jadyn Holdenried – 2025 (3rd)
- Maya Loudd – 2025 (3rd)
- Kelsey Branson – 2025 (4th)
- Ioanna Papatheodorou – 2024 (2nd)
- Kolo Suliafu – 2024 (3rd)
- Summer Yates – 2021 (2nd), 2020 (2nd), 2019 (2nd)
- Ameera Hussen – 2020 (2nd)
- Kaylene Pang – 2020 (2nd), 2019 (2nd)
- Jessica Udovich – 2017 (3rd)
- McKenzie Karas – 2015 (2nd)
- Kimberley Keever – 2015 (3rd)
- Shannon Simon – 2015 (3rd)
- Jaclyn Softli – 2014 (2nd)
- Kate Bennett – 2014 (erd)
- Lindsay Elston – 2012 (2nd)
- Kate Deines – 2010 (1st), 2009 (3rd)
- Jorde LaFontaine-Kussman – 2010 (3rd)
- Kendyl Pele – 2010 (3rd)
- Verónica Pérez – 2009 (2nd), 2008 (2nd)
- Tina Frimpong – 2003 (1st)
- Nikki Gamble – 2003 (3rd)
- Melissa Gamble – 2003 (3rd)
- Hope Solo – 2001 (1st), 2000 (1st), 1999 (2nd)
- Caroline Putz – 2001 (3rd), 2000 (3rd)
- Andrea Morelli – 2000 (2nd)
- Theresa Wagner – 2000 (2nd)
- Tina Thompson – 1996 (1st)
- Katey Ward – 1996 (2nd)
- Tara Bilanski – 1995 (1st), 1994 (1st)
- Sanya Trandum – 1995 (2nd)
- Samanta Obara – 1994 (1st)
- Melanie Brennan – 1994 (1st)

Pac-12 Player of the Year:

- Tina Frimpong – 2003–2004
- Hope Solo – 2001

Big Ten Defender of the Year:

- Kolo Suliafu – 2025

Pac-12 Defender of the Year:

- Andrea Morelli – 1999

Pac-12 Medal Winner:

- Tina Frimpong – 2004
- Jeannine Jensen – 1994
