= 2020 Arkansas Razorbacks women's soccer team =

American college soccer season

2020 Arkansas Razorbacks women's soccer

SEC regular season champions SEC West Division champions

SEC Tournament runners-up NCAA Tournament Third Round
- Conference: Southeastern Conference
- TopDrawerSoccer.com: No. 14
- Record: 12–4–0 (7–1–0 SEC)
- Head coach: Colby Hale (9th season)
- Assistant coaches: Rob Donnenwirth (3rd season); Sammy Scofield (3rd season)
- Home stadium: Razorback Field (Capacity: 1,500)

2020 SEC women's soccer standings
	Conf.						Overall
Team	W		L		T	PCT	W		L		T	PCT
East
No. 10 South Carolina ‍‍‍	6	–	2	–	0	.750	7	–	3	–	0	.700
No. 13 Tennessee ‍‍‍	4	–	3	–	1	.563	7	–	4	–	1	.625
Vanderbilt ‍†‍‍	4	–	4	–	0	.500	8	–	4	–	0	.667
Missouri ‍‍‍	3	–	2	–	2	.571	5	–	3	–	2	.600
Georgia ‍‍‍	2	–	3	–	2	.429	3	–	4	–	2	.444
Kentucky ‍‍‍	1	–	4	–	3	.313	1	–	5	–	3	.278
Florida ‍‍‍	1	–	6	–	1	.188	3	–	7	–	2	.333
West
No. 7 Arkansas ‍‍‍	7	–	1	–	0	.875	10	–	3	–	0	.769
No. 8 Texas A&M ‍‍‍	7	–	1	–	0	.875	8	–	2	–	0	.800
No. 14 Ole Miss ‍‍‍	4	–	4	–	0	.500	6	–	5	–	0	.545
Auburn ‍‍‍	3	–	3	–	2	.500	5	–	4	–	3	.542
Mississippi State ‍‍‍	2	–	3	–	3	.438	3	–	4	–	3	.450
Alabama ‍‍‍	2	–	4	–	2	.375	4	–	5	–	2	.455
LSU ‍‍‍	0	–	6	–	2	.125	4	–	7	–	3	.393
† – Conference champion ‡ – 2020 SEC Tournament champion As of March 4, 2021; Rankings from United Soccer Coaches Poll; Source: SEC

The 2020 Arkansas Razorbacks women's soccer team represented the University of Arkansas during the 2020 NCAA Division I women's soccer season. This season was the 35th in program history. The Razorbacks played their home games at Razorback Field in Fayetteville and were led by ninth-year head coach Colby Hale.

The Razorbacks are playing a shortened, eight-game conference-only regular season schedule in the fall due to the COVID-19 pandemic. The season began on September 19 with a home game against LSU and ended with the SEC Tournament Championship on November 22. On February 3, 2021, it was announced that Arkansas would play a six-game non-conference spring schedule, beginning on February 21 and ending April 15.

== Previous season ==
In 2019, the Razorbacks finished the regular season 14–2–2, 8–1–1 in SEC play, winning their first regular-season SEC championship and capturing the top overall seed in the SEC Tournament, where they defeated 6-seed Ole Miss and 5-seed Florida en route to the championship game, where they fell 0–1 to 3-seed South Carolina. The Razorbacks were selected as an at-large bid to the NCAA Tournament, where they received a 3-seed and defeated North Texas in the first round of the Stanford bracket before being defeated in the second round by NC State. The Hogs finished their season with a record of 17–4–2.

== Personnel ==
=== Roster ===
2020 Arkansas Razorbacks women's soccer
Goalkeepers: 0 Lexi Gonzalez – Freshman; 00 Alexis Bach – Junior; 1 Darby Douglas – Freshman; 30 Payton Woodward – Sophomore; 33 Taylor Beitz – Senior; Defenders: 5 Julia Laskaris – Senior; 7 Caroline Brooks – Freshman; 11 Brooke Pirkle – Senior; 18 Reagan Swindall – Sophomore; 19 Margot Reemtsen – Freshman (F); 26 Bryana Hunter – Junior; 28 Mandi Wilson – Senior; 99 Haley VanFossen – Senior	Midfielders: 4 Ashton Gordon – Sophomore; 10 Ellie Podojil – Freshman; 12 Kayla McKeon – Senior; 13 Tyler Runnels – Junior; 15 Mackenzie Frederick – Freshman (D); 17 Hannah Gott – Freshman; 23 Nayeli Perez – Junior; 25 Claire Monyard – Sophomore; Forwards: 2 Ainsley Jeffrey – Freshman; 3 Kiley Dulaney – Freshman; 6 Mia Wehby – Freshman; 8 Caroline Campbell – Senior; 9 Jordan Stack – Sophomore; 14 Taylor Malham – Senior; 16 Anna Podojil – Sophomore; 20 Emilee Hauser – Freshman (D); 21 Ava Tankersley – Freshman (M); 22 Parker Goins – Senior; 27 Kaelee Van Gundy – Junior; 32 Callie Hurley – Freshman; 88 McKenna Saul – Sophomore

=== Coaching staff ===
Coach	Position	Year in Position	Alma Mater
Colby Hale	Head coach	9th	Oral Roberts (1997)
Rob Donnenwirth	Assistant coach	3rd	West Virginia Wesleyan (1988)
Sammy Scofield	Assistant coach	3rd	Notre Dame (2015)

== Schedule ==
Date Time, TV	Rank^{#}	Opponent^{#}	Result	Record	Site (Attendance) City, State
Fall SEC regular season
September 19, 2020; 3:00 p.m., SEC Network		LSU	W 2–0	1–0 (1–0)	Razorback Field (289); Fayetteville, AR
September 27, 2020; 5:00 p.m., SECN+	No. 13	at Kentucky	W 4–1	2–0 (2–0)	Wendell & Vickie Bell Soccer Complex (104); Lexington, KY
October 4, 2020; 2:00 p.m., SEC Network	No. 9	No. 5 Texas A&M	W 2–1	3–0 (3–0)	Razorback Field (317); Fayetteville, AR
October 11, 2020; 2:00 p.m., ESPNU	No. 3	at Alabama	W 2–1 ^{OT}	4–0 (4–0)	Alabama Soccer Complex (115); Tuscaloosa, AL
October 16, 2020; 7:00 p.m., SECN+	No. 3	No. 15 South Carolina	L 1–2	4–1 (4–1)	Razorback Field (352); Fayetteville, AR
October 25, 2020; 3:00 p.m., SEC Network	No. 7	at Ole Miss	W 2–1	5–1 (5–1)	Ole Miss Soccer Stadium (264); Oxford, MS
October 30, 2020; 6:30 p.m., SECN+	No. 7	No. 15 Auburn	W 2–1	6–1 (6–1)	Razorback Field (320); Fayetteville, AR
November 6, 2020; 6:00 p.m., SECN+	No. 7	at Mississippi State	W 2–1	7–1 (7–1)	MSU Soccer Field (431); Starkville, MS
SEC Tournament
November 17, 2020; 5:00 p.m., SEC Network	(1) No. 6	vs. (8) Auburn; SEC Tournament Quarterfinals	W 4–3	8–1	Orange Beach Sportsplex; Orange Beach, AL
November 19, 2020; 6:00 p.m., SEC Network	(1) No. 6	vs. (4) No. 10 South Carolina; SEC Tournament Semifinal	W 2–1	9–1	Orange Beach Sportsplex; Orange Beach, AL
November 22, 2020; 1:00 p.m., SEC Network	(1) No. 6	vs. (7) Vanderbilt; SEC Tournament Championship	L 1–3	9–2	Orange Beach Sportsplex; Orange Beach, AL
Spring non-conference regular season
February 21, 2021*; 3:00 p.m., SECN	No. 7	Missouri State	W 7–0	10–2	Razorback Field (236); Fayetteville, AR
February 28, 2021*; 12:00 p.m.	No. 7	Saint Louis	L 1–3	10–3	Razorback Field (304); Fayetteville, AR
March 20, 2021*; 1:00 p.m., ESPN+	No. 14	at Arkansas State	W 2–1	11–3	A-State Soccer Park (532); Jonesboro, AR
April 10, 2021*; 6:00 p.m.		Arkansas State; Exhibition	W 2–1		Razorback Field; Fayetteville, AR
Spring non-conference regular season
May 1, 2021*; 3:00 p.m.	(6)	vs. Utah Valley	W 3–1	12–3	Stewart Johnson Stadium (158); Greenville, NC
May 5, 2021*; 9:20 p.m.	(6)	vs. (11) Santa Clara	L 0–2	12–4	WakeMed Soccer Park; Cary, NC
*Non-conference game. ^{#}Rankings from United Soccer Coaches for fall games and Top Drawer Soccer for spring games. (#) Tournament seedings in parentheses. All times are in Central.

== Game summaries ==
=== Fall SEC regular season ===
September 19, 2020
3:00 p.m. CDT

LSU	0–2	Arkansas
Wasila Diwura-Soale (yellow card) 35'; Savannah Mills (yellow card) 37'	Report	Reagan Swindall 35'; Caroline Campbell (yellow card) 40'; Parker Goins 56'

Razorback Field, Fayetteville, Arkansas
Attendance: 289
Referee: Shane Butler

September 27, 2020
3:00 p.m. CDT

No. 13 Arkansas	4–1	Kentucky
Anna Podojil 8', 54'; Brooke Pirkle (yellow card) 36'; Taylor Malham 49'; Ava Tankersley 90'	Report	Jordyn Rhodes 36' (pen.)

Wendell & Vickie Bell Soccer Complex, Lexington, Kentucky
Attendance: 104
Referee: Corey Rockwell

October 4, 2020
2:00 p.m. CDT

No. 5 Texas A&M	1–2	No. 9 Arkansas
Addie McCain 61'; Barbara Olivieri (yellow card) 75'	Report	Parker Goins 11' (yellow card) 28'; Kayla McKeon 53'

Razorback Field, Fayetteville, Arkansas
Attendance: 317
Referee: Timothy Debysingh

October 11, 2020
2:00 p.m. CDT

No. 3 Arkansas	2–1 (a.e.t.)	Alabama
Kayla McKeon 27'; Haley VanFossen (yellow card) 57'; Brooke Pirkle (yellow card) 73'; Ava Tankersley 91'	Report	Macy Clem 41'; Sydney Vincens (yellow card) 85'

Alabama Soccer Complex, Tuscaloosa, Alabama
Attendance: 115
Referee: Aaron Hernandez

October 16, 2020
7:00 p.m. CDT

No. 15 South Carolina	2–1	No. 3 Arkansas
Corinna Zullo 37'; Samantha Chang 71'; Anna Patten (yellow card) 81'	Report	Anna Podojil 57'

Razorback Field, Fayetteville, Arkansas
Attendance: 352
Referee: Ryan Cigich

October 25, 2020
3:00 p.m. CDT

No. 7 Arkansas	2–1	Ole Miss
Bryana Hunter (yellow card) 11'; Kayla McKeon 36'; Nayeli Perez 43'	Report	Madison Smith (yellow card) 70'; Mo O'Connor 80'

Ole Miss Soccer Stadium, Oxford, Mississippi
Attendance: 264
Referee: Mark Kadlecik

October 30, 2020
6:30 p.m. CDT

No. 15 Auburn	1–2	No. 7 Arkansas
Anna Haddock (yellow card) 39'; Alyssa Malonson 76'	Report	Anna Podojil 13'; Parker Goins 19'; Taylor Malham (yellow card) 76'

Razorback Field, Fayetteville, Arkansas
Attendance: 320
Referee: Michael Lavergne

November 6, 2020
6:00 p.m. CST

No. 7 Arkansas	2–1	Mississippi State
Parker Goins 11'; Ava Tankersley 19'	Report	Kristen Malebranche (yellow card) 3'; Hailey Farrington-Bentil 33'; Macey Hodge (yellow card) 33'

MSU Soccer Field, Starkville, Mississippi
Attendance: 431
Referee: Michael Smith

=== SEC Tournament ===
November 17, 2020
5:00 p.m. CST
Quarterfinals

(8) Auburn	3–4	(1) Arkansas
Mallory Mooney 49'; Sydney Richards 52'; Anna Haddock 87'	Report	Kayla McKeon 8', 22' (yellow card) 58'; Taylor Malham 14'; Reagan Swindall 18'; Ava Tankersley (yellow card) 61'; Bryana Hunter (yellow card) 82'

Orange Beach Sportsplex, Orange Beach, Alabama
Referee: Corey Rockwell

November 19, 2020
6:00 p.m. CST
Semifinals

(4) South Carolina	1–2	(1) Arkansas
Ranya Senhaji 66'	Report	Caroline Brooks 44'; Emilee Hauser 53'; Brooke Pirkle (yellow card) 62'

Orange Beach Sportsplex, Orange Beach, Alabama
Referee: Christina Unkel

November 22, 2020
1:00 p.m. CST
Championship

(7) Vanderbilt	3–1	(1) Arkansas
Kimya Raietparvar 3'; Raegan Kelley 5'; Abi Brighton 54'	Report	Kayla McKeon 1'

Orange Beach Sportsplex, Orange Beach, Alabama
Attendance: 750
Referee: Tori Penso

=== Spring non-conference regular season ===
February 21, 2021
3:00 p.m. CST

Missouri State	0–7	No. 7 Arkansas
	Report	Reagan Swindall 15'; Anna Podojil 37', 84'; Ainsley Jeffrey 44'; Parker Goins 56'; Ava Tankersley 71'; Tyler Runnels 72'

Razorback Field, Fayetteville, Arkansas
Attendance: 236
Referee: Jose Iara

February 28, 2021
12:00 p.m. CST

Saint Louis	3–1	No. 7 Arkansas
Sophia Stram 19'; Hannah Larson 49' (yellow card) 53'; Emily Groark 89'	Report	Parker Goins 56'

Razorback Field, Fayetteville, Arkansas
Attendance: 304
Referee: Andrew Musashe

March 20, 2021
1:00 p.m. CDT

No. 14 Arkansas	2–1	Arkansas State
Bryana Hunter 13' (yellow card) 24'; Anna Podojil 61'; Caroline Brooks (yellow card) 74'	Report	Sarah Sodoma 42'; Darby Stotts (yellow card) 60'

A-State Soccer Park, Jonesboro, Arkansas
Attendance: 532
Referee: David Henderson

April 10, 2021
6:00 p.m. CDT

Arkansas State	1–2 Exhibition	Arkansas

Razorback Field, Fayetteville, Arkansas

== Ranking movements ==
=== Fall season ===
Ranking movements Legend: ██ Increase in ranking ██ Decrease in ranking
	Week								
Poll	1	2	3	4	5	6	7	8	Final
United Soccer Coaches	13	9	3	3	7	7	7	7	6

=== Spring season ===
Ranking movements Legend: ██ Increase in ranking ██ Decrease in ranking
	Week										
Poll	Pre	1	2	3	4	5	6	7	8	9	Final
Top Drawer Soccer	7	7	7	7	15	14	14				
