= 2021 SEC women's soccer tournament =

Soccer tournament

- Classification: Division I
- Teams: 10
- Matches: 9
- Site: Orange Beach Sportsplex; Orange Beach, Alabama
- Champions: Tennessee (5th title)
- Winning coach: Brian Pensky (1st title)
- MVP: Abbey Burdette (Tennessee)
- Broadcast: SEC Network

2021 SEC women's soccer standings
	Conf.						Overall
Team	W		L		T	PCT	W		L		T	PCT
East
No. 11 Tennessee ‍‍‡‍^{y}	8	–	2	–	0	.800	20	–	3	–	0	.870
No. 10 South Carolina ‍‍‍^{y}	6	–	3	–	1	.650	14	–	7	–	1	.659
Vanderbilt ‍‍‍	5	–	4	–	1	.550	8	–	8	–	3	.500
Georgia ‍‍‍	4	–	4	–	2	.500	11	–	5	–	3	.658
Florida ‍‍‍	3	–	6	–	1	.350	4	–	12	–	4	.300
Missouri ‍‍‍	3	–	7	–	0	.300	6	–	11	–	0	.353
Kentucky ‍‍‍	1	–	9	–	0	.100	7	–	10	–	2	.421
West
No. 6 Arkansas ‍†‍‍^{y}	9	–	1	–	0	.900	19	–	4	–	1	.813
No. 18 Ole Miss ‍‍‍^{y}	6	–	3	–	1	.650	12	–	6	–	3	.643
Auburn ‍‍‍^{y}	5	–	4	–	1	.550	12	–	7	–	1	.625
Alabama ‍‍‍^{y}	5	–	4	–	1	.550	11	–	10	–	1	.523
Texas A&M ‍‍‍	4	–	5	–	1	.450	8	–	8	–	2	.500
LSU ‍‍‍^{y}	4	–	6	–	0	.400	11	–	8	–	1	.575
Mississippi State ‍‍‍	3	–	6	–	1	.350	5	–	8	–	3	.406
† – Conference champion ‡ – 2021 SEC Tournament champion y – Invited to the NCAA tournament As of December 7, 2021; Rankings from United Soccer Coaches Poll; Source:SEC

The 2021 SEC women's soccer tournament was the postseason women's soccer tournament for the Southeastern Conference held from October 31 to November 7, 2021. The tournament was held at the Orange Beach Sportsplex in Orange Beach, Alabama. The ten-team single elimination tournament consisted of four rounds based on seeding from regular season conference play. The Vanderbilt Commodores are the defending champions. The Commodores were unable to defend their crown, losing to Florida in the First Round. Tennessee won the tournament with a 1–0 victory over Arkansas in the final. The conference championship is the fifth for the Tennessee women's soccer program and the first for head coach Brian Pensky. As tournament champions, Tennessee earned the Southeastern Conference's automatic berth into the 2021 NCAA Division I Women's Soccer Tournament.

== Qualification ==
The top 10 teams in the conference qualified for the 2021 Tournament. Tiebreakers were required to determine the third and fourth seeds as Ole Miss and South Carolina both finished with 6–3–1 regular season records. Ole Miss was awarded the third seed and South Carolina earned the fourth seed based on Ole Miss' 2–1 victory over South Carolina during the regular season. Another tiebreaker was required to determine the seeding for Alabama, Auburn, and Vanderbilt, as all three teams finished with a 5–4–1 conference record. Due to the fact that all three teams did not play each other during the regular season points earned against common opponents was used as the tiebreaker. Auburn was awarded the fifth seed based on their 4 points earned, Alabama was the 6th seed with 1 point earned, and Vanderbilt was the seventh seed with zero points earned. There was another three-way tie for the tenth, and final seed between Florida, Texas A&M, and Mississippi State as all three teams finished with a 3–6–1 conference record. Again, all three teams had not played each other during the regular season, so points against common opponents was used. All three teams scored 6 points against common opponents, so goal differential against common opponents was used. Florida won this tiebreaker with a 0 GD and was awarded the tenth seed. Texas A&M was the eleventh team with a -1 GD, and Mississippi State was the twelfth team with a -2 GD.

Seed	School	Conference Record	Conference Points
1	Arkansas	9–1–0	27
2	Tennessee	8–2–0	24
3	Ole Miss	6–3–1	19
4	South Carolina	6–3–1	19
5	Auburn	5–4–1	16
6	Alabama	5–4–1	16
7	Vanderbilt	5–4–1	16
8	Georgia	4–4–2	14
9	LSU	4–6–0	12
10	Florida	3–6–1	10

== Bracket ==
First round
8	Georgia	0 (4)
9	LSU (pen.)	0 (5)
7	Vanderbilt	1 (3)
10	Florida (pen.)	1 (4)

Quarterfinals
1	Arkansas	2
9	LSU	1
4	South Carolina	1
5	Auburn	2
3	Ole Miss	1
6	Alabama	0
10	Florida	2
2	Tennessee	5

Semifinals
1	Arkansas	5
5	Auburn	1
3	Ole Miss	2
2	Tennessee	3

Finals
1	Arkansas	0
2	Tennessee	3

== Matches ==
=== First round ===
October 31 Match 1	Vanderbilt	1–1 (a.e.t.) (3–4 p)	Florida	Orange Beach
1:00 p.m. CT	Maddie Elwell 72'	Report	89' (o.g.) Own Goal	Stadium: Orange Beach Sportsplex
	Penalties
	Kate Devine (penalty scored); Ella Shamburger (penalty scored); Abi Brighton (penalty missed); Alex Kerr (penalty scored); Amber Nguyen (penalty missed)		(penalty scored) Madison Alexander; (penalty scored) Julianne Leskauskas; (penalty scored) Cameron Hall; (penalty scored) Maddy Rhodes

October 31 Match 2	Georgia	0–0 (a.e.t.) (4–5 p)	LSU	Orange Beach
3:30 p.m. CT		Report		Stadium: Orange Beach Sportsplex
	Penalties
	Daniella Murguia (penalty scored); Mollie Belisle (penalty scored); Abby Boyan (penalty scored); Emory Wegener (penalty missed); Danielle Lewin (penalty scored); Madison Haugen (penalty missed)		(penalty scored) Shannon Cooke; (penalty missed) Meghan Johnson; (penalty scored) Brenna McPartlan; (penalty scored) Tilly Wilkes; (penalty scored) Mollee Swift; (penalty scored) Jordan Johnson

=== Quarterfinals ===
November 2 Match 3	Tennessee	5–2	Florida	Orange Beach
12:00 p.m. CT	Jaida Thomas 18', 90'; Abbey Burdette 20'; Taylor Huff 59'; Mackenzie George 86'	Report	24' Georgia Eaton-Collins; 81' Julianne Leskauskas	Stadium: Orange Beach Sportsplex

November 2 Match 4	Ole Miss	1–0	Alabama	Orange Beach
2:30 p.m. CT	Molly Martin 11'	Report		Stadium: Orange Beach Sportsplex

November 2 Match 5	Arkansas	2–1	LSU	Orange Beach
5:00 p.m. CT	Anna Podojil 18', 61'	Report	Shannon Cooke 90'	Stadium: Orange Beach Sportsplex

November 2 Match 6	South Carolina	1–2	Auburn	Orange Beach
7:30 p.m. CT	Catherine Barry 72' (pen.)	Report	M.E. Craven 41'; Sydney Richards 64'	Stadium: Orange Beach Sportsplex

=== Semifinals ===
November 4 Semifinal 1	Arkansas	5–1	Auburn	Orange Beach
5:00 p.m. CT	Kayla McKeon 41', 47'; Taylor Malham 76'; Bea Franklin 81'; Ava Benedetti 83'	Report	48' Sydnie Thibodaux	Stadium: Orange Beach Sportsplex

November 4 Semifinal 2	Tennessee	3–2	Ole Miss	Orange Beach
7:30 p.m. CT	Jaida Thomas 18', 70'; Own Goal 86' (o.g.)	Report	46' (pen.) Channing Foster; 76' Saydie Holland	Stadium: Orange Beach Sportsplex

=== Final ===
November 7 Final	Arkansas	0–3	Tennessee	Orange Beach
1:00 p.m. CT		Report	43' Wrenne French; 51' Jaida Thomas; 68' Hannah Tillett	Stadium: Orange Beach Sportsplex

== Statistics ==
There were 30 goals scored in 9 matches, for an average of 3.33 goals per match.

5 goals

- (United States) Jaida Thomas – Tennessee

2 goals

- (United States) Kayla McKeon – Arkansas
- (United States) Anna Podojil – Arkansas

1 goal

- (United States) Ava Benedetti – Arkansas
- (United States) Bea Franklin – Arkansas
- (United States) Taylor Malham – Arkansas
- (United States) M.E. Craven – Auburn
- (United States) Sydney Richards – Auburn
- (United States) Sydnie Thibodaux – Auburn
- (England) Georgia Eaton-Collins – Florida
- (United States) Julianne Leskauskas – Florida
- (England) Shannon Cooke – LSU
- (United States) Channing Foster – Ole Miss
- (United States) Saydie Holland – Ole Miss
- (United States) Molly Martin – Ole Miss
- (United States) Catherine Barry – South Carolina
- (United States) Abbey Burdette – Tennessee
- (United States) Wrenne French – Tennessee
- (United States) Mackenzie George – Tennessee
- (United States) Taylor Huff – Tennessee
- (United States) Hannah Tillett – Tennessee
- (United States) Maddie Elwell – Vanderbilt

1 own goal

- Ole Miss (against Tennessee)
- Vanderbilt (against Florida)

== All-Tournament team ==
Player	Team
Parker Goins	Arkansas
Kayla McKeon	Arkansas
Haley VanFossen	Arkansas
Olivia Candelino	Auburn
M.E. Craven	Auburn
Molly Martin	Ole Miss
Taylor Radecki	Ole Miss
**Abbey Burdette**	Tennessee
Wrenne French	Tennessee
Mackenzie George	Tennessee
Jaida Thomas	Tennessee

MVP in bold
