= 2019 Arkansas Razorbacks women's soccer team =

American college soccer season

2019 Arkansas Razorbacks women's soccer

SEC regular season champion

SEC tournament runner-up NCAA Tournament
- Conference: Southeastern Conference
- U. Soc. Coaches poll: No. 12
- TopDrawerSoccer.com: No. 10
- Record: 17–4–2 (8–1–1 SEC)
- Head coach: Colby Hale (8th season)
- Assistant coaches: Rob Donnenwirth (2nd season); Sammy Scofield (2nd season)
- Home stadium: Razorback Field (Capacity: 1,500)

2019 SEC women's soccer standings
	Conf.						Overall
Team	W		L		T	PCT	W		L		T	PCT
East
No. 6 South Carolina ‍†‍‡‍^{y}	7	–	0	–	3	.850	19	–	2	–	3	.854
Vanderbilt ‍‍‍^{y}	6	–	3	–	1	.650	14	–	5	–	2	.714
Florida ‍‍‍^{y}	6	–	3	–	1	.650	11	–	9	–	1	.548
Georgia ‍‍‍	4	–	3	–	3	.550	8	–	7	–	4	.526
Tennessee ‍‍‍	3	–	5	–	2	.400	9	–	6	–	3	.583
Kentucky ‍‍‍	1	–	8	–	1	.150	6	–	10	–	3	.395
Missouri ‍‍‍	1	–	8	–	1	.150	7	–	10	–	1	.417
West
No. 12 Arkansas ‍†‍‍^{y}	8	–	1	–	1	.850	17	–	4	–	2	.783
No. 22 Texas A&M ‍‍‍^{y}	7	–	2	–	1	.750	14	–	5	–	3	.705
Alabama ‍‍‍	4	–	4	–	2	.500	10	–	7	–	3	.575
Ole Miss ‍‍‍	3	–	4	–	3	.450	10	–	7	–	3	.575
Auburn ‍‍‍	4	–	6	–	0	.400	7	–	10	–	2	.421
Mississippi St. ‍‍‍	3	–	4	–	3	.450	8	–	8	–	3	.500
LSU ‍‍‍	1	–	7	–	2	.200	3	–	12	–	3	.250
† – Conference champion ‡ – 2019 SEC Tournament champion y – Invited to the NCAA Tournament; As of December 11, 2019; Rankings from United Soccer Coaches Poll; Source:SEC

The 2019 Arkansas Razorbacks women's soccer team represented the University of Arkansas during the 2019 NCAA Division I women's soccer season. This season was the 34th in program history. The Razorbacks played their home games at Razorback Field in Fayetteville and were led by eighth-year head coach Colby Hale.

== Previous season ==
In 2018, the Razorbacks finished the regular season 11–4–3, 6–3–1 in SEC play, and were seeded fourth in the SEC Tournament, where they defeated 5-seed Ole Miss and 8-seed Florida en route to the championship game, where they fell in penalties to 7-seed LSU. The Razorbacks were selected as an at-large bid to the NCAA Tournament, where they defeated Little Rock in the first round of the North Carolina bracket before being defeated in extra time by Virginia Tech. The Hogs finished their season with a record of 14–6–3.

== Personnel ==
=== Roster ===
2019 Arkansas Razorbacks women's soccer
Goalkeepers: 00 Alexis Bach – (redshirt) Sophomore; 1 Katie Lund – Senior; 33 Taylor Beitz – (redshirt) Junior; Defenders: 2 Marissa Kinsey – Senior; 4 Ashton Gordon – Freshman; 5 Julia Laskaris – Junior; 7 Madison Louk – Senior; 18 Reagan Swindall – Freshman; 20 Madi McBurnett – Freshman; 26 Bryana Hunter – Sophomore; 28 Mandi Wilson – Senior; 99 Haley Vanfossen – Junior	Midfielders: 6 Cara Young – Freshman; 11 Brooke Pirkle – Junior; 12 Kayla McKeon – Senior; 13 Tyler Runnels – Sophomore; 14 Taylor Malham – Junior; 15 Raegan Cox – Freshman; 17 Stefani Doyle – Senior; 23 Nayeli Perez – (redshirt) Sophomore; 24 Abbi Neece – Junior; 25 Claire Monyard – Freshman; Forwards: 3 Tori Cannata – Senior; 8 Caroline Campbell – Sophomore; 9 Jordan Stack – Freshman; 16 Anna Podojil – Freshman; 21 Kyler Goins – Freshman; 22 Parker Goins – Junior; 27 Kaelee van Gundy – Sophomore

=== Coaching staff ===
Coach	Position	Year in Position	Alma Mater
Colby Hale	Head coach	8th	Oral Roberts University (1997)
Rob Donnenwirth	Assistant coach	2nd	West Virginia Wesleyan College (1988)
Sammy Scofield	Assistant coach	2nd	University of Notre Dame (2015)

== Schedule ==
Date Time, TV	Rank^{#}	Opponent^{#}	Result	Record	Site (Attendance) City, State
Fall exhibition
August 9*; 5:00 p.m.		at Kansas State	T 3–3		Buser Family Park (0 (Note: Closed-door exhibition match.)); Manhattan, KS
August 16*; 7:00 p.m.		Nebraska	T 0–0		Razorback Field (200); Fayetteville, AR
Non-conference regular season
August 22*; 6:00 p.m.		at UNC Greensboro	W 3–0	1–0	UNCG Soccer Stadium (616); Greensboro, NC
August 25*; 6:00 p.m., SEC Network		Oklahoma	L 0–1 ^{AET}	1–1	Razorback Field (2,241); Fayetteville, AR
August 29*; 4:00 p.m.		vs. Minnesota; Rebel Classic	T 1–1 ^{AET}	1–1–1	Ole Miss Soccer Stadium (86); Oxford, MS
September 1*; 2:00 p.m.		vs. Southeast Missouri State; Rebel Classic	W 5–0	2–1–1	Ole Miss Soccer Stadium (136); Oxford, MS
September 5*; 7:00 p.m., SECN+		Lamar	W 7–0	3–1–1	Razorback Field (343); Fayetteville, AR
September 8*; 1:00 p.m., SECN+		McNeese State	W 7–0	4–1–1	Razorback Field (586); Fayetteville, AR
September 12*; 9:00 p.m.		at No. 22 Baylor	W 2–0	5–1–1	Betty Lou Mays Field (388); Waco, TX
September 15*; 12:00 p.m., ESPNU		No. 1 North Carolina	W 2–0 (Note: This was Arkansas' first defeat of a No. 1 team in school history; additionally, this was the first time an SEC team had beaten North Carolina by two goals or more.)	6–1–1	Razorback Field (1,058); Fayetteville, AR
SEC regular season
September 22; 2:00 p.m., SEC Network	No. 16	Alabama	W 1–0	7–1–1 (1–0–0)	Razorback Field (615); Fayetteville, AR
September 26; 7:00 p.m.	No. 13	No. 15 Vanderbilt	W 1–0	8–1–1 (2–0–0)	Razorback Field (845); Fayetteville, AR
September 29; 1:00 p.m.	No. 13	at No. 8 South Carolina	L 0–1	8–2–1 (2–1–0)	Eugene E. Stone III Stadium (1,399); Columbia, SC
October 3; 7:00 p.m.	No. 15	Ole Miss	W 3–0	9–2–1 (3–1–0)	Razorback Field (754); Fayetteville, AR
October 10; 6:00 p.m.	No. 13	at LSU	W 4–0	10–2–1 (4–1–0)	LSU Soccer Stadium (1,106); Baton Rouge, LA
October 13; 1:00 p.m.	No. 13	Mississippi State	W 6–1	11–2–1 (5–1–0)	Razorback Field (1,194); Fayetteville, AR
October 18; 7:30 p.m.	No. 8	at No. 18 Texas A&M	W 3–1	12–2–1 (6–1–0)	Ellis Field (2,485); College Station, TX
October 24; 6:30 p.m.	No. 6	at Auburn	W 5–0	13–2–1 (7–1–0)	Auburn Soccer Complex (812); Auburn, AL
October 27; 1:00 p.m.	No. 6	Georgia	T 1–1 ^{AET}	13–2–2 (7–1–1)	Razorback Field (1,594); Fayetteville, AR
October 31; 6:00 p.m.	No. 6	at Tennessee	W 3–1	14–2–2 (8–1–1)	Regal Stadium; Knoxville, TN
SEC tournament
November 5; 5:30 p.m., SECN+	(1)	(6) Ole Miss; SEC Tournament Quarterfinals	W 1–0	15–2–2	Orange Beach Sportsplex; Orange Beach, AL
November 7; 3:30 p.m., SEC Network	(1)	(5) Florida; SEC Tournament Semifinals	W 3–1	16–2–2	Orange Beach Sportsplex; Orange Beach, AL
November 10; 1:00 p.m., SEC Network	(1)	(3) South Carolina; SEC Tournament Final	L 0–1	16–3–2	Orange Beach Sportsplex (961); Orange Beach, AL
NCAA tournament
November 15; 6:30 p.m.	(3)	North Texas; NCAA Tournament First Round	W 3–0	17–3–2	Razorback Field (1,331); Fayetteville, AR
November 21; 4:00 p.m.	(3)	vs. NC State; NCAA Tournament Second Round	L 1–2	17–4–2	South Field (2,476); Provo, UT
*Non-conference game. ^{#}Rankings from United Soccer Coaches. (#) Tournament seedings in parentheses.

== Ranking movements ==
Ranking movements Legend: ██ Increase in ranking ██ Decrease in ranking — = Not ranked
	Week										
Poll	Pre	1	2	3	4	5	6	7	8	9	Final
United Soccer Coaches	—	—	—	—	16	13	15	13	8	6	6
TopDrawerSoccer.com	—	—	—	—	22	19	24	23	17	6	5
Soccer America	—	—	—	—	13	10	16	11	8	8	6
NCAA RPI	—	—	—	—	—	13	12	6	6	6	6
