= 2021 Alabama Crimson Tide women's soccer team =

American college soccer season

2021 Alabama Crimson Tide women's soccer
- Conference: Southeastern Conference
- Record: 8–7–1 (3–3–1 SEC)
- Head coach: Wes Hart (7th season)
- Home stadium: Alabama Soccer Stadium (Capacity: 1,500)

The 2021 Alabama Crimson Tide women's soccer team represented the University of Alabama during the 2021 NCAA Division I women's soccer season. The regular season began on August 19, 2020, and concluded with the SEC Tournament. It was the program's 30th season fielding a women's varsity soccer team. The 2021 season was Wes Hart's 7th year as head coach for the program.

== Roster ==
As of August 12, 2021

Note: Flags indicate national team as defined under FIFA eligibility rules; some limited exceptions apply. Players may hold more than one non-FIFA nationality.

No.	Pos.	Nation	Player
0	GK	USA	Eva Hoyseth
1	GK	USA	McKinley Crone
2	MF	USA	Macy Clem
3	FW	USA	Brooke Steere
4	DF	MEX	Tanna Sanchez-Carreto
5	DF	USA	Bella Scaturro
6	DF	USA	Sasha Pickard
7	DF	USA	Gessica Skorka
8	MF	USA	Felicia Knox
9	MF	CAN	Aislin Streicek
10	FW	USA	Riley Mattingly
11	GK	USA	Brooke Bollinger
12	FW	PAN	Riley Tanner
13	MF	USA	Morgan Quillen
14	DF	USA	Madison Schott

No.	Pos.	Nation	Player
15	MF	USA	Kat Rogers
16	MF	MEX	Reyna Reyes
17	MF	USA	Kate Henderson
18	FW	AUT	Emelie Kobler
19	MF	USA	Ashlynn Serepca
20	FW	USA	Carys Hall
21	MF	USA	Taylor Carter
22	MF	USA	Leah Kunde
23	MF	USA	Raigen Powell
24	FW	USA	Kolbi Coleman
25	MF	USA	Allie Berk
27	FW	USA	Sydney Vincens
29	GK	USA	Kate Henderson
32	GK	USA	Hannah Alexander
33	FW	USA	Penny Smith

== Matches ==
=== Pre-season ===
August 11 Exhibition	Tennessee	0–0	Alabama	Knoxville
4:00 p.m. CT		Report		Stadium: Regal Stadium; Attendance: 410

=== Regular season ===
August 19	Alabama	4–0	Jacksonville State	Tuscaloosa
7:00 p.m. CT	Reyna Reyes 10'; Macy Clem 45'; Ashlynn Serepca 47'; Leah Kunde 68'	Report		Stadium: Alabama Soccer Stadium; Attendance: 262

August 22	Florida State	4–0	Alabama	Tallahassee
12:00 p.m. CT	Brooke Bollinger 21' (o.g.); Maria Alagoa 33'; Beata Olsson 63'; Gianna Mitchell 83'	Report		Stadium: Seminole Soccer Complex; Attendance: 838

August 27	Alabama	3–1	Lamar	Tuscaloosa
7:00 p.m. CT	Kate Henderson 35', 63'; Allie Berk 70'	Report	Isela Ramirez 25'	Stadium: Alabama Soccer Stadium; Attendance: 528

August 29	Alabama	3–2 (a.e.t.)	Southern Mississippi	Tuscaloosa
1:00 p.m. CT	Bella Scaturro 29'; Ashlynn Serepca 55' (pen.); Felicia Knox 108'	Report	Ilana Izquierdo 65', 66'	Stadium: Alabama Soccer Stadium; Attendance: 191

September 2	Alabama	0–1	Samford	Tuscaloosa
7:00 p.m. CT		Report	Alyssa Frazier 56'	Stadium: Alabama Soccer Stadium; Attendance: 306

September 5	Memphis	3–1	Alabama	Memphis
6:00 p.m. CT	Tanya Boychuk 40', 67'; Mya Jones 74'	Report	Leah Kunde 41'	Stadium: Mike Rose Soccer Complex; Attendance: 482

September 9	Alabama	1–2 (a.e.t.)	TCU	Tuscaloosa
6:00 p.m. CT	Felicia Knox 61'	Report	Camryn Lancaster 35'; Messiah Bright 93'	Stadium: Alabama Soccer Stadium; Attendance: 259

September 12	Alabama	2–0	UAB	Tuscaloosa
6:00 p.m. CT	Tanna Sanchez-Carreto 61'; Ashlynn Serepca 62'	Report		Stadium: Alabama Soccer Stadium; Attendance: 313

September 16 SEC 1	Ole Miss	3–1	Alabama	Oxford
6:00 p.m. CT	Mo O'Connor 10'; Haleigh Stackpole 35'; Molly Martin 44'	Report	Kate Henderson 23'	Stadium: Ole Miss Soccer Stadium; Attendance: 337

September 19	Alabama	3–0	Utah Valley	Tuscaloosa
1:00 p.m. CT	Ashlynn Serepca 18', 25'; Macy Clem 46'	Report		Stadium: Alabama Soccer Stadium; Attendance: 214

September 23 SEC 2	Alabama	2–1	Missouri	Tuscaloosa
7:00 p.m. CT	Kate Henderson 66'; Riley Tanner 84'	Report	Jadyn Easley 67'	Stadium: Alabama Soccer Stadium; Attendance: 270

September 26 SEC 3	Vanderbilt	3–0	Alabama	Nashville
1:00 p.m. CT	Peyton Cutshall 14'; Raegan Kelley 50', 52'	Report		Stadium: Vanderbilt Soccer/Lacrosse Complex; Attendance: 567

October 1 SEC 4	Alabama	1–0	LSU	Tuscaloosa
7:00 p.m. CT	Reyna Reyes 84'	Report		Stadium: Alabama Soccer Stadium; Attendance: 1162

October 7 SEC 5	Arkansas	3–1	Alabama	Fayetteville
6:00 p.m. CT	Ava Tankersley 28'; Bryana Hunter 46'; Kiley Dulaney 47'	Report	Macy Clem 35'	Stadium: Razorback Field; Attendance: 1508

October 10 SEC 6	Alabama	1–0	Mississippi State	Tuscaloosa
1:00 p.m. CT	Riley Tanner 72'	Report		Stadium: Alabama Soccer Stadium; Attendance: 430

October 15 SEC 7	Texas A&M	1–1 (a.e.t.)	Alabama	College Station
7:00 p.m. CT	Barbara Olivieri 45'	Report	Kate Henderson 56'	Stadium: Ellis Field; Attendance: 2485

October 21 SEC 8	Alabama	2–1 (a.e.t.)	Kentucky	Tuscaloosa
7:00 p.m. CT	Reyna Reyes 36'; Riley Tanner 92'	Report	Marissa Bosco 14'	Stadium: Alabama Soccer Stadium; Attendance: 384

October 24 SEC 9	South Carolina	4–0	Alabama	Columbia
12:00 p.m. CT	Catherine Barry 2'; Samantha Chang 25'; Ryan Gareis 31'; Payton Patrick 78'	Report		Stadium: Stone Stadium; Attendance: 1,223

October 28 SEC 10	Alabama	1–0	Auburn	Tuscaloosa
7:00 p.m. CT	Allie Berk 82'	Report		Stadium: Alabama Soccer Stadium; Attendance: 398

=== Postseason ===
==== SEC Tournament ====
October 31 Round 1	Alabama	0–1	Ole Miss	Orange Beach
		Report	Molly Martin 11'	Stadium: Orange Beach Sportsplex

==== NCAA Tournament ====
November 12, 2021 First round	Clemson	0–1	Alabama	Clemson
3:00 p.m. CT		Report	Allie Berk 4'	Stadium: Riggs Field; Attendance: 527

November 18, 2021 Second round	BYU	4–1	Alabama	Charlottesville
3:00 p.m. CT	Cameron Tucker 4'; Mikayla Colohan 20' (pen.), 44', 74'		Felicia Knox 65'	Stadium: Klöckner Stadium
