= 2020 SEC women's soccer tournament =

American women's college soccer postseason tournament

- Classification: Division I
- Teams: 14
- Matches: 13
- Site: Orange Beach Sportsplex; Orange Beach, Alabama
- Champions: Vanderbilt (3rd title)
- MVP: Myra Konte (Vanderbilt)
- Broadcast: SEC Network

2020 SEC women's soccer standings
	Conf.						Overall
Team	W		L		T	PCT	W		L		T	PCT
East
No. 10 South Carolina ‍‍‍	6	–	2	–	0	.750	7	–	3	–	0	.700
No. 13 Tennessee ‍‍‍	4	–	3	–	1	.563	7	–	4	–	1	.625
Vanderbilt ‍†‍‍	4	–	4	–	0	.500	8	–	4	–	0	.667
Missouri ‍‍‍	3	–	2	–	2	.571	5	–	3	–	2	.600
Georgia ‍‍‍	2	–	3	–	2	.429	3	–	4	–	2	.444
Kentucky ‍‍‍	1	–	4	–	3	.313	1	–	5	–	3	.278
Florida ‍‍‍	1	–	6	–	1	.188	3	–	7	–	2	.333
West
No. 7 Arkansas ‍‍‍	7	–	1	–	0	.875	10	–	3	–	0	.769
No. 8 Texas A&M ‍‍‍	7	–	1	–	0	.875	8	–	2	–	0	.800
No. 14 Ole Miss ‍‍‍	4	–	4	–	0	.500	6	–	5	–	0	.545
Auburn ‍‍‍	3	–	3	–	2	.500	5	–	4	–	3	.542
Mississippi State ‍‍‍	2	–	3	–	3	.438	3	–	4	–	3	.450
Alabama ‍‍‍	2	–	4	–	2	.375	4	–	5	–	2	.455
LSU ‍‍‍	0	–	6	–	2	.125	4	–	7	–	3	.393
† – Conference champion ‡ – 2020 SEC Tournament champion As of March 4, 2021; Rankings from United Soccer Coaches Poll; Source: SEC

The 2020 SEC women's soccer tournament is the postseason women's soccer tournament for the 2020 Southeastern Conference season. The tournament is being contested over five days between November 13–22 at the Orange Beach Sportsplex in Orange Beach, Alabama. The South Carolina Gamecocks are the defending champions.

Due to the shortened conference season as a result of the COVID-19 pandemic, this year's conference tournament includes every team, in a format identical to that of the men's and women's basketball tournaments.

== Teams ==
Seed	School	Record (Division)	Division finish
1	Arkansas Razorbacks	7–1–0 (6–0–0)	1st (West)
2	Tennessee Volunteers	4–3–1 (4–1–1)	1st (East)
3	Texas A&M Aggies	7–1–0 (5–1–0)	2nd (West)
4	South Carolina Gamecocks	6–2–0 (4–2–0)	2nd (East)
5	Missouri Tigers	3–2–2 (3–2–0)	3rd (East)
6	Ole Miss Rebels	4–4–0 (2–4–0)	5th (West)
7	Vanderbilt Commodores	4–4–0 (3–3–0)	4th (East)
8	Auburn Tigers	3–3–2 (2–3–1)	4th (West)
9	Georgia Bulldogs	2–3–2 (2–1–2)	5th (East)
10	Mississippi State Bulldogs	2–3–3 (2–2–2)	3rd (West)
11	Alabama Crimson Tide	2–4–2 (1–3–2)	6th (West)
12	Kentucky Wildcats	1–4–3 (1–3–2)	6th (East)
13	Florida Gators	1–6–1 (0–5–2)	7th (East)
14	LSU Tigers	0–6–2 (0–5–1)	7th (West)

== Schedule ==
Match	Time*	Matchup^{#}	Score	Television
First round – Friday, November 13
1	6:30 p.m.	No. 14 LSU vs. No. 11 Alabama	2–0	SEC Network
2	8:00 p.m.	No. 13 Florida vs. No. 12 Kentucky	6–5 (OT)	SEC Network
Second round – Sunday, November 15
3	Noon	No. 10 Mississippi State vs. No. 7 Vanderbilt	0–4	SEC Network
4	2:30 p.m.	No. 14 LSU vs. No. 6 Ole Miss	2–1 (OT)	SEC Network
5	5:00 p.m.	No. 9 Georgia vs. No. 8 Auburn	1–2 (2OT)	SEC Network
6	7:30 p.m.	No. 13 Florida vs. No. 5 Missouri	1–2	SEC Network
Quarterfinals – Tuesday, November 17
7	Noon	No. 7 Vanderbilt vs. No. 2 Tennessee	4–2	SEC Network
8	2:30 p.m.	No. 14 LSU vs. No. 3 Texas A&M	0–1	SEC Network
9	5:00 p.m.	No. 8 Auburn vs. No. 1 Arkansas	3–4	SEC Network
10	7:30 p.m.	No. 5 Missouri vs. No. 4 South Carolina	2–3	SEC Network
Semifinals – Thursday, November 19
11	6:00 p.m.	No. 4 South Carolina vs. No. 1 Arkansas	1–2	SEC Network
12	8:30 p.m.	No. 7 Vanderbilt vs. No. 3 Texas A&M	3–1	SEC Network
Championship Match – Sunday, November 22
13	1:00 p.m.	No. 7 Vanderbilt vs. No. 1 Arkansas	3–1	SEC Network

*Game times in Central Time. #Rankings denote tournament seeding.

== Bracket ==
First round Friday, November 13
12	Kentucky	5
13	Florida	6*
11	Alabama	0
14	LSU	2

Second round Sunday, November 15
8	Auburn	2**
9	Georgia	1
5	Missouri	2
13	Florida	1
7	Vanderbilt	4
10	Mississippi State	0
6	Ole Miss	1
14	LSU	2*

Quarterfinals; Tuesday, November 17
1	Arkansas	4
8	Auburn	3
4	South Carolina	3
5	Missouri	2
2	Tennessee	2
7	Vanderbilt	4
3	Texas A&M	1
14	LSU	0

Semifinals; Thursday, November 19
1	Arkansas	2
4	South Carolina	1
7	Vanderbilt	3
3	Texas A&M	1

Championship; Sunday, November 22
1	Arkansas	1
7	Vanderbilt	3

== Match summaries ==
All matches are played at Orange Beach Sportsplex in Orange Beach, Alabama. All times are Central.

=== First Round ===
November 13, 2020	No. 14 LSU	2–0	No. 11 Alabama	Orange Beach, Alabama
6:30 p.m.	Wasila Diwura-Soale (yellow card) 6'; Taylor Dobles 13', 88' (yellow card) 21'; Jordan Johnson (yellow card) 38'	Report	Brynn Martin (yellow card) 44'; Casey Wertz (yellow card) 53'; Kaley Verpaele (yellow card) 68'	Stadium: Orange Beach Sportsplex; Referee: Andrew Musashe; Assistant referees: Jamie Willis; Craig Lowry; Fourth official: Aaron Hernandez

November 13, 2020	No. 13 Florida	6–5 (a.e.t.)	No. 12 Kentucky	Orange Beach, Alabama
8:00 p.m.	Parker Roberts 24', 89'; Cassidy Lindley 62' 96'; Laney Steed 68'; Deanne Rose 76' (pen.)	Report	Jordyn Rhodes 26', 29' (pen.), 84'; Úlfa Úlfarsdóttir 26' (yellow card) 43'; Hannah Richardson 83'	Stadium: Orange Beach Sportsplex; Referee: Christina Unkel; Assistant referees: Kendall McCardell; Kayla Polonsky; Fourth official: Aaron Hernandez

=== Second Round ===
November 15, 2020	No. 10 Mississippi State	0–4	No. 7 Vanderbilt	Orange Beach, Alabama
Noon	Marcella Cash (yellow card) 73'	Report	Andrea Tyrrell 9' (o.g.); Abi Brighton 17'; Sophia Gorski 41' (yellow card) 76'; Madison Elwell 55'	Stadium: Orange Beach Sportsplex; Referee: Jonathan Weiner; Assistant referees: Kendall McCardell; Craig Lowry; Fourth official: Corey Rockwell

November 15, 2020	No. 14 LSU	2–1 (a.e.t.)	No. 6 Ole Miss	Orange Beach, Alabama
2:30 p.m.	Tinaya Alexander 32' 100'; Wasila Diwura-Soale (yellow card) 59'	Report	Madisyn Pezzino 44'; Molly Martin (yellow card) 81'	Stadium: Orange Beach Sportsplex; Referee: Elvis Mahmutovic; Assistant referees: Laura Chambers; Jamie Willis; Fourth official: Aaron Hernandez

November 15, 2020	No. 9 Georgia	1–2 (a.e.t.)	No. 8 Auburn	Orange Beach, Alabama
5:00 p.m.	Abby Boyan 26'; Mallie McKenzie (yellow card) 66'; Jessica Denney (yellow card) 75'; Tori Penn (yellow card) 97'	Report	Sydney Richards 9'; Mallory Mooney 101'	Stadium: Orange Beach Sportsplex; Referee: Andrew Mushashe; Assistant referees: Kayla Polonsky; Craig Lowry; Fourth official: Rich Grady

November 15, 2020	No. 13 Florida	1–2	No. 5 Missouri	Orange Beach, Alabama
7:30 p.m.	Nicole Vernis (yellow card) 18'; Cassidy Lindley 21'; Parker Roberts (yellow card) 71'	Report	Macy Trujillo 17'; Bella Alessi 72'	Stadium: Orange Beach Sportsplex; Referee: Aaron Hernandez; Assistant referees: Corey Rockwell; Laura Chambers; Fourth official: Rich Grady

=== Quarterfinals ===
November 17, 2020	No. 7 Vanderbilt	4–2	No. 2 Tennessee	Orange Beach, Alabama
Noon	Madison Elwell 8' (yellow card) 25'; Leila Azari 18'; Kimya Raietparvar 58' (pen.); Olivia Simmons (yellow card) 70'; Raegan Kelley 72'	Report	Mackenzie Ostrom (yellow card) 6'; Mackenzie George 23', 85'; Abbey Burdette (yellow card) 25'	Stadium: Orange Beach Sportsplex; Referee: Samantha Martinez; Assistant referees: Craig Lowry; Kayla Polonsky; Fourth official: Rich Grady

November 17, 2020	No. 14 LSU	0–1	No. 3 Texas A&M	Orange Beach, Alabama
2:30 p.m.	Chiara Ritchie-Williams (yellow card) 23'; Taylor Dobles (yellow card) 64'	Report	Jimena López 41'; Kate Colvin (yellow card) 74'; Barbara Olivieri (yellow card) 77'	Stadium: Orange Beach Sportsplex; Referee: Jonathan Weiner; Assistant referees: Kendall McCardell; Ryan Starr; Fourth official: Jennifer Politz

November 17, 2020	No. 8 Auburn	3–4	No. 1 Arkansas	Orange Beach, Alabama
5:00 p.m.	Mallory Mooney 49'; Sydney Richards 52'; Anna Haddock 87'	Report	Kayla McKeon 8', 22' (yellow card) 58'; Taylor Malham 14'; Reagan Swindall 18'; Ava Tankersley (yellow card) 61'; Bryana Hunter (yellow card) 82'	Stadium: Orange Beach Sportsplex; Referee: Corey Rockwell; Assistant referees: Laura Chambers Waliski; Jaime Willis; Fourth official: Aaron Hernandez

November 17, 2020	No. 5 Missouri	2–3	No. 4 South Carolina	Orange Beach, Alabama
7:30 p.m.	Bella Alessi 47'; Julissa Cisneros 60'	Report	Lauren Chang 5'; Sutton Jones 21'; Catherine Barry 47'	Stadium: Orange Beach Sportsplex; Referee: Rich Grady; Assistant referees: Ryan Starr; Kayla Polonsky; Fourth official: Ryan Cigich

=== Semifinals ===
November 19, 2020	No. 4 South Carolina	1–2	No. 1 Arkansas	Orange Beach, Alabama
6:00 p.m.	Ranya Senhaji 66'	Report	Caroline Brooks 44'; Emilee Hauser 53'; Brooke Pirkle (yellow card) 62'	Stadium: Orange Beach Sportsplex; Referee: Christina Unkel; Assistant referees: Craig Lowry; Kendall McCardell; Fourth official: Ryan Cigich

November 19, 2020	No. 7 Vanderbilt	3–1	No. 3 Texas A&M	Orange Beach, Alabama
8:30 p.m.	Haley Hopkins 24', 77'; Abi Brighton (yellow card) 59'; Raegan Kelley 81'	Report	Kate Colvin 34'; Barbara Olivieri (yellow card) 48'; Laney Carroll (yellow card) 68'; Addie McCain (yellow card) 70'	Stadium: Orange Beach Sportsplex; Referee: Mark Kadlecik; Assistant referees: Ryan Starr; Laura Chambers; Fourth official: Kayla Polonsky

=== Championship ===
November 22, 2020	No. 7 Vanderbilt	3–1	No. 1 Arkansas	Orange Beach, Alabama
1:00 p.m.	Kimya Raietparvar 3' (pen.); Raegan Kelley 5'; Abi Brighton 54'		Kayla McKeon 1'	Stadium: Orange Beach Sportsplex

== Statistics ==
=== Goalscorers ===
There were 56 goals scored in 13 matches, for an average of 4.31 goals per match.

3 goals

- Arkansas Kayla McKeon
- Florida Cassidy Lindley
- Kentucky Jordyn Rhodes
- Vanderbilt Raegan Kelley

2 goals

- Auburn Mallory Mooney
- Auburn Sydney Richards
- Florida Parker Roberts
- LSU Tinaya Alexander
- LSU Taylor Dobles
- Missouri Bella Alessi
- Tennessee Mackenzie George
- Vanderbilt Madison Elwell
- Vanderbilt Haley Hopkins
- Vanderbilt Abi Brighton
- Vanderbilt Kimya Raietparvar

1 goal

- Arkansas Caroline Brooks
- Arkansas Emilee Hauser
- Arkansas Taylor Malham
- Arkansas Reagan Swindall
- Auburn Anna Haddock
- Florida Deanne Rose
- Florida Laney Steed
- Georgia Abby Boyan
- Kentucky Hannah Richardson
- Kentucky Úlfa Úlfarsdóttir
- Missouri Julissa Cisneros
- Missouri Macy Trujillo
- Ole Miss Madisyn Pezzino
- South Carolina Catherine Barry
- South Carolina Lauren Chang
- South Carolina Sutton Jones
- South Carolina Ranya Senhaji
- Texas A&M Kate Colvin
- Texas A&M Sutton Jones
- Vanderbilt Leila Azari
- Vanderbilt Sophia Gorski

1 own goal

- Mississippi State Andrea Tyrrell (against Vanderbilt)

=== Discipline ===
Discipline by player
Rank	Player	Team	Booked	(yellow card) (yellow-red card)	Sent off (straight red)
1	Wasila Diwura-Soale	LSU	2		
1	Taylor Dobles	LSU	2		
1	Barbara Olivieri	Texas A&M	2		
4	Brynn Martin	Alabama	1		
4	Kaley Verpaele	Alabama	1		
4	Casey Wertz	Alabama	1		
4	Brooke Pirkle	Arkansas	1		
4	Bryana Hunter	Arkansas	1		
4	Taylor Malham	Arkansas	1		
4	Ava Tankersley	Arkansas	1		
4	Parker Roberts	Florida	1		
4	Nicole Vernis	Florida	1		
4	Jessica Deeney	Georgia	1		
4	Mallie McKenzie	Georgia	1		
4	Tori Penn	Georgia	1		
4	Úlfa Úlfarsdóttir	Kentucky	1		
4	Jordan Johnson	LSU	1		
4	Chiara Ritchie-Williams	LSU	1		
4	Marcella Cash	Mississippi State	1		
4	Molly Martin	Ole Miss	1		
4	Abbey Burdette	Tennessee	1		
4	Mackenzie Ostrom	Tennessee	1		
4	Laney Carroll	Texas A&M	1		
4	Kate Colvin	Texas A&M	1		
4	Addie McCain	Texas A&M	1		
4	Abi Brighton	Vanderbilt	1		
4	Madison Elwell	Vanderbilt	1		
4	Sophia Gorski	Vanderbilt	1		
4	Olivia Simmonds	Vanderbilt	1		

Discipline by team
Rank	Team	Booked	(yellow card) (yellow-red card)	Sent off (straight red)
1	LSU	6		
2	Texas A&M	5		
3	Arkansas	4		
3	Vanderbilt	4		
5	Alabama	3		
5	Georgia	3		
7	Florida	2		
7	Tennessee	2		
9	Kentucky	1		
9	Mississippi State	1		
9	Ole Miss	1		

== See also ==
- Southeastern Conference
- 2020 NCAA Division I women's soccer season
- 2020 NCAA Division I Women's Soccer Tournament
