= 2019 SEC women's soccer tournament =

American college tournament

- Classification: Division I
- Teams: 10
- Matches: 9
- Attendance: 2,031
- Site: Orange Beach Sportsplex; Orange Beach, Alabama
- Champions: South Carolina (2nd title)
- Winning coach: Shelley Smith (2nd title)
- MVP: Grace Fisk (South Carolina)
- Broadcast: SEC Network

2019 SEC women's soccer standings
	Conf.						Overall
Team	W		L		T	PCT	W		L		T	PCT
East
No. 6 South Carolina ‍†‍‡‍^{y}	7	–	0	–	3	.850	19	–	2	–	3	.854
Vanderbilt ‍‍‍^{y}	6	–	3	–	1	.650	14	–	5	–	2	.714
Florida ‍‍‍^{y}	6	–	3	–	1	.650	11	–	9	–	1	.548
Georgia ‍‍‍	4	–	3	–	3	.550	8	–	7	–	4	.526
Tennessee ‍‍‍	3	–	5	–	2	.400	9	–	6	–	3	.583
Kentucky ‍‍‍	1	–	8	–	1	.150	6	–	10	–	3	.395
Missouri ‍‍‍	1	–	8	–	1	.150	7	–	10	–	1	.417
West
No. 12 Arkansas ‍†‍‍^{y}	8	–	1	–	1	.850	17	–	4	–	2	.783
No. 22 Texas A&M ‍‍‍^{y}	7	–	2	–	1	.750	14	–	5	–	3	.705
Alabama ‍‍‍	4	–	4	–	2	.500	10	–	7	–	3	.575
Ole Miss ‍‍‍	3	–	4	–	3	.450	10	–	7	–	3	.575
Auburn ‍‍‍	4	–	6	–	0	.400	7	–	10	–	2	.421
Mississippi St. ‍‍‍	3	–	4	–	3	.450	8	–	8	–	3	.500
LSU ‍‍‍	1	–	7	–	2	.200	3	–	12	–	3	.250
† – Conference champion ‡ – 2019 SEC Tournament champion y – Invited to the NCAA Tournament; As of December 11, 2019; Rankings from United Soccer Coaches Poll; Source:SEC

The 2019 SEC women's soccer tournament was the postseason women's soccer tournament for the SEC. The LSU Tigers were the defending champions, but they were unable to defend their title after not qualifying for the 2019 tournament.. The South Carolina won the tournament title with a 1–0 win over the Arkansas Razorbacks in the final. This was the second SEC women's soccer tournament title for South Carolina, and the second for coach Shelley Smith.

== Qualification ==
The top ten teams earned a berth into the SEC Tournament. The tournament is held at Orange Beach Sportsplex in Orange Beach, Alabama.

== Bracket ==
First round Sunday, November 3
7	Alabama	2^{(OT)}
10	Auburn	1
8	Ole Miss	2
9	Mississippi St.	1

Quarterfinals; Tuesday, November 5
2	Vanderbilt	2
7	Alabama	1
3	South Carolina	1
6	Georgia	0
1	Arkansas	1
8	Ole Miss	0
4	Texas A&M	1
5	Florida	2

Semifinals; Friday, November 7
2	Vanderbilt	0
3	South Carolina	2
1	Arkansas	3
5	Florida	1

Championship; Sunday, November 10
3	South Carolina	1
1	Arkansas	0

== Schedule ==
All matches are played at Orange Beach Sportsplex in Orange Beach, Alabama.

=== First Round ===
November 3, 2019	#7 Alabama	2–1 (a.e.t.)	#10 Auburn	Orange Beach, Alabama
2:00 p.m. EST	Casey Wertz 8'; Reyna Reyes (yellow card) 35'; Macy Clem (yellow card) 53', 97'	Report	(yellow card) 26' Treva Aycock; 30' Jessie Gerow	Stadium: Orange Beach Sportsplex; Referee: Becky Pagan; Assistant referees: Craig Lowry; Jennifer Garner; Fourth official: Gus St. Silva

November 3, 2019	#8 Ole Miss	2–1	#9 Mississippi State	Orange Beach, Alabama
4:30 p.m. EST	Mississippi State 12' (o.g.); Gabby Little 88'	Report	88' (pen.) Niah Johnson	Stadium: Orange Beach Sportsplex; Attendance: 425; Referee: Tori Penso; Assistant referees: Kate Wasiak; Sam Bilbo; Fourth official: Gus St. Silva

=== Quarterfinals ===
November 5, 2019	#2 Vanderbilt	2–1	#7 Alabama	Orange Beach, Alabama
1:00 p.m. EST	Haley Hopkins 12', 74'	Report	(yellow card) 76' Reyna Reyes; 87' Nealy Martin	Stadium: Orange Beach Sportsplex; Referee: Tori Penso; Assistant referees: Jennifer Garner; Ryan Starr; Fourth official: Becky Pagan

November 5, 2019	#3 South Carolina	1–0	#6 Georgia	Orange Beach, Alabama
3:30 p.m. EST	Sarah Eskew (yellow card) 14'; Rebecca Koch 50'	Report		Stadium: Orange Beach Sportsplex; Referee: Samantha Martinez; Assistant referees: Craig Lowry; Kate Wasiak; Fourth official: Gus St. Silva

November 5, 2019	#1 Arkansas	1–0	#8 Ole Miss	Orange Beach, Alabama
6:00 p.m. EST	Taylor Malham 23' (pen.); Haley VanFossen (yellow card) 54'; Anna Podojil (yellow card) 84'	Report	(yellow card) 36' Lonnie Mulligan	Stadium: Orange Beach Sportsplex; Referee: Jonathan Weiner; Assistant referees: Ryan Starr; Sam Bilbo; Fourth official: Gus St. Silva

November 5, 2019	#4 Texas A&M	1–2	#5 Florida	Orange Beach, Alabama
8:30 p.m. EST	Grace Piper (yellow card) 61'; Ally Watt 80'	Report	40' Parker Roberts; 62' Vanessa Kara	Stadium: Orange Beach Sportsplex; Referee: Andrey Casterl; Assistant referees: Kate Wiasiak; Craig Lowry; Fourth official: Gus St. Silva

=== Semifinals ===
November 7, 2019	#1 Arkansas	3–1	#5 Florida	Orange Beach, Alabama
4:30 p.m. EST	Stefani Doyle 40', (yellow card) 77'; Anna Podojil 58', 77'; Team (yellow card) 82'	Report	62' Vanessa Kara; (yellow card) 83' Parker Roberts	Stadium: Orange Beach Sportsplex; Referee: Mark Kadlecik; Assistant referees: Craig Lowry; Kate Wasiak; Fourth official: Andrew Musache

November 7, 2019	#2 Vanderbilt	0–2	#3 South Carolina	Orange Beach, Alabama
7:00 p.m. EST	Ella Shamburger (yellow card) 24'	Report	31' Sutton Jones; 42' Luciana Zullo	Stadium: Orange Beach Sportsplex; Attendance: 645; Referee: Corey Rockwell; Assistant referees: Ryan Starr; Sam Bilbo; Fourth official: Jonathan Weiner

=== Final ===
November 10, 2019	#1 Arkansas	0–1	#3 South Carolina	Orange Beach, Alabama
2:00 p.m. EST	Haley VanFossen (yellow card) 13'; Stefani Doyle (yellow card) 31'	Report	26' Ryan Gareis; (yellow card) 60' Sutton Jones; (yellow card) 68' Mikayla Krzeczowski	Stadium: Orange Beach Sportsplex; Attendance: 961; Referee: Andrew Musache; Assistant referees: Katarzyna Wasiak; Sam Bilbo; Fourth official: Kayla Polonsky

== Statistics ==
=== Goalscorers ===
There were 21 goals scored in 9 matches, for an average of 2.33 goals per match.

2 goals

- Anna Podojil (Arkansas)
- Vanessa Kara (Florida)
- Haley Hopkins (Vanderbilt)

1 goal

- Macy Clem (Alabama)
- Nealy Martin (Alabama)
- Casey Wertz (Alabama)
- Stefani Doyle (Arkansas)
- Taylor Malham (Arkansas)
- Jessie Gerow (Auburn)
- Parker Roberts (Florida)
- Niah Johnson (Mississippi State)
- Gabby Little (Ole Miss)
- Ryan Gareis (South Carolina)
- Sutton Jones (South Carolina)
- Rebecca Koch (South Carolina)
- Luciana Zullo (South Carolina)
- Ally Watt (Texas A&M)

1 own goal

- Mississippi State vs. Ole Miss

== All-Tournament team ==
Player	Team
**Grace Fisk**	South Carolina
Jyllissa Harris	South Carolina
Sutton Jones	South Carolina
Mikayla Krzeczowski	South Carolina
Stefani Doyle	Arkansas
Katie Lund	Arkansas
Anna Podojil	Arkansas
Haley Hopkins	Vanderbilt
Madiya Harriott	Vanderbilt
Julia Lester	Florida
Parker Roberts	Florida

MVP in bold

== See also ==
- Southeastern Conference
- 2019 NCAA Division I women's soccer season
- 2019 NCAA Division I Women's Soccer Tournament
