= 2020 Alabama Crimson Tide women's soccer team =

American college soccer season

2020 Alabama Crimson Tide women's soccer
- Conference: Southeastern Conference
- Record: 7–8–2 (2–5–2 SEC)
- Head coach: Wes Hart (5th season)
- Home stadium: Alabama Soccer Stadium (Capacity: 1,500)

The 2020 Alabama Crimson Tide women's soccer team represented the University of Alabama during the 2020 NCAA Division I women's soccer season. The fall season began on September 19, 2020, and concluded with the SEC Tournament. The spring season began on February 19, 2021 and was set to conclude on April 10. It was the program's 29th season fielding a women's varsity soccer team. The 2020 season was Wes Hart's 5th year as head coach for the program.

== Effect of the Covid-19 Pandemic ==
The SEC was one of the few conferences to play a fall season, with each team playing eight conference games, with the SEC Tournament in November.

On November 4, 2020, the NCAA approved a plan for college soccer to also be played in the spring, along with the 2020 NCAA Division I Women's Soccer Tournament.

== Roster ==
As of March 5, 2021

Note: Flags indicate national team as defined under FIFA eligibility rules; some limited exceptions apply. Players may hold more than one non-FIFA nationality.

No.	Pos.	Nation	Player
0	GK	USA	Eva Hoyseth
2	MF	USA	Macy Clem
3	FW	USA	Brooke Steere
4	DF	MEX	Tanna Sanchez-Carreto
5	DF	USA	Bella Scaturro
6	DF	USA	Sasha Pickard
7	DF	USA	Gessica Skorka
8	MF	USA	Felicia Knox
9	MF	CAN	Aislin Streicek
10	FW	USA	Riley Mattingly
13	GK	USA	McKinley Crone

No.	Pos.	Nation	Player
15	MF	USA	Kat Rogers
16	MF	MEX	Reyna Reyes
17	MF	USA	Kaley Verpaele
21	MF	USA	Taylor Carter
23	MF	USA	Raigen Powell
25	MF	USA	Allie Berk
27	FW	USA	Sydney Vincens
29	GK	USA	Kate Henderson
33	FW	USA	Penny Smith
55	GK	USA	Anna Woodson
—	GK	USA	Hannah Alexander

== Matches ==
=== Fall season ===
==== Regular season ====
September 19, 2020	Alabama	1–3	Tennessee	Tuscaloosa, Alabama
1:00 p.m. CT	Riley Mattingly 19', 48'; Serena Pham 49'	Report	Erin Gilroy 76'	Stadium: Alabama Soccer Stadium; Attendance: 131

September 25, 2020	Mississippi State	1–3	Alabama	Starkville, Mississippi
6:00 p.m. CT	Hailey Farrington-Bentil 90'	Report	Felicia Knox 5'	Stadium: MSU Soccer Field; Attendance: 375

October 4, 2020	Florida	2–1	Alabama	Gainesville, Florida
2:00 p.m. CT	Madison Alexander 62'; Alivia Gonzalez 89'	Report	Sydney Vincens 5'	Stadium: Donald R. Dizney Stadium; Attendance: 368

October 11, 2020	Alabama	1–2 (a.e.t.)	Arkansas	Tuscaloosa, Alabama
2:00 p.m. CT	Macy Clem 41'	Report	Kayla McKeon , 27'; Ava Tankersley 91'	Stadium: Alabama Soccer Stadium; Attendance: 115

October 18, 2020	Alabama	2–0	Ole Miss	Tuscaloosa, Alabama
2:00 p.m. CT		Report	Channing Foster 10'; Alabama own goal 51' (o.g.)	Stadium: Alabama Soccer Stadium; Attendance: 135

October 23, 2020	LSU	3–3	Alabama	Baton Rouge, Louisiana
7:00 p.m. CT	Tinaya Alexander 26', 59'; Molly Thompson 77'	Report	Carly Wyatt 20', 21'; Serena Pham 58'	Stadium: LSU Soccer Stadium; Attendance: 450

October 30, 2020	Alabama	1–2	Texas A&M	Tuscaloosa, Alabama
7:00 p.m. CT	Macy Clem 41'	Report	Taylor Pounds 1'; Laney Carroll 68'	Stadium: Alabama Soccer Stadium; Attendance: 118

November 6, 2020	Auburn	0–1	Alabama	Auburn, Alabama
6:00 p.m. CT		Report	Felicia Knox 37'	Stadium: LSU Soccer Stadium; Attendance: 200

==== SEC Tournament ====
October 23, 2020	Alabama	0–2	LSU	Orange Beach, Alabama
6:00 p.m. CT		Report	Taylor Dobles 13', 88'	Stadium: Orange Beach Sportsplex; Attendance: 312

=== Spring season ===
February 19, 2021	Alabama	2–0	Columbus State	Tuscaloosa, Alabama
2:00 p.m. CT	Macy Clem 65'; Felicia Knox 72' (pen.)	Report		Stadium: Alabama Soccer Stadium; Attendance: 73

February 26, 2021	Alabama	1–0	Louisiana	Tuscaloosa, Alabama
5:00 p.m. CT	Taylor Carter 58'	Report		Stadium: Alabama Soccer Stadium; Attendance: 138

March 4, 2021	Alabama	1–0	Montevallo	Tuscaloosa, Alabama
6:00 p.m. CT	Reyna Reyes 33'	Report		Stadium: Alabama Soccer Stadium; Attendance: 122

March 7, 2021	Lipscomb	0–1 (a.e.t.)	Alabama	Nashville, Tennessee
2:00 p.m. CT		Report	Reyna Reyes 93'	Stadium: Lipscomb Soccer Complex; Attendance: 125

March 13, 2021	Alabama	0–1	Texas Tech	Bossier City, Louisiana
2:00 p.m. CT		Report	Kirsten Davis 16'	Stadium: Freedom Fields

March 21, 2021	South Alabama	2–4	Alabama	Mobile, Alabama
1:00 p.m. CT	Laurence Saviana 56'; Gracie Wilson 63'	Report	Felicia Knox 21'; Kat Rogers 29'; Sydney Vincens 43'; Tan Sanchez-Carreto 66'	Stadium: The Cage; Attendance: 130

March 27, 2021	Alabama	1–2	Auburn	Tuscaloosa, Alabama
2:00 p.m. CT	Tanna Sanchez-Carreto 90'	Report	Sydney Richards 17'; Hailey Whitaker 54'	Stadium: Alabama Soccer Stadium; Attendance: 234

April 3, 2021	Clemson	1–0	Alabama	Clemson, South Carolina
12:00 p.m. CT	Renee Guion 98'			Stadium: Riggs Field

April 10, 2021	Alabama	Cancelled	Mississippi State	Tuscaloosa, Alabama
1:00 p.m. CT		Report		Stadium: Alabama Soccer Stadium
