= 2020 NCAA Division I women's soccer season =

American college soccer season

- Duration: Fall season: September 10 – November 15, 2020; Spring season: February 3 – May 17, 2021
- Number of teams: 306

Statistics

Tournament
- Duration: April 30 to May 17, 2021

College Cup
- Date: May 17, 2021
- Site: WakeMed Soccer Park (Cary, NC)
- Champions: Santa Clara
- Runners-up: Florida State

Seasons
- ← 2019 2021 →

The 2020 NCAA Division I women's soccer season was the 38th season of NCAA championship women's college soccer. The season was originally slated to begin on August 20, 2020 and conclude on November 9, 2020. The season was to culminate with the 2020 NCAA Division I Women's Soccer Tournament, which was to be held from November 18 to December 13, 2020, with the four-team College Cup.

On August 13, 2020, the NCAA Tournament, along with all fall sport tournaments, was suspended due to the ongoing COVID-19 pandemic. Leading up to the postseason tournament suspension, some conferences had planned to play conference-only matches during the fall season, while some conferences opted to postpone the season to Spring 2021 (February to May 2021). Ultimately, the Atlantic Coast Conference, Big 12 Conference, Southeastern Conference, and the Sun Belt Conference began play for the 2020 fall season; while a handful of programs scheduled competitive fixtures for the fall 2020 season: Navy, Mercer, Middle Tennessee, and UAB.

On September 16, 2020 the NCAA announced that the spring season would run from February 3 to April 17, 2021, culminating with the NCAA Tournament, which was reduced from 64 to 48 teams for this season only. The postponed NCAA Tournament began on April 30 and ended on May 17, 2021. The ACC, Big 12, SEC, and Sun Belt champions, who will be determined in November, will earn automatic bids into the tournament. Nevertheless, the season began on September 10, 2020, with Appalachian State hosting Pitt, with Pitt winning the match 4–0.

== Preseason ==
=== New programs ===
On November 27, 2017, it was announced that, in 2020, the Tritons of the University of California, San Diego, located in the San Diego, California district of La Jolla, would begin the transition from Division II to Division I as a member of the Big West Conference.

On January 11, 2019, it was announced that the Trailblazers of Dixie State University (Note: now known as Utah Tech University) of St. George, Utah would begin the transition from Division II to Division I as a member of the Western Athletic Conference (WAC).

On June 17, 2019, it was announced that the Knights of Bellarmine University of Louisville, Kentucky would begin the transition from Division II to Division I as a member of the ASUN Conference.

On July 15, 2020, after months of consideration, the NCAA granted the highly unusual request of the University of St. Thomas to move directly from Division III to Division I. The school had already accepted an invitation to join the Summit League, and the Tommies will enter Division I and Summit League competition in 2021.

=== Conference realignment ===
School	Previous Conference	New Conference
Cal State Bakersfield	Western Athletic Conference (WAC)	Big West Conference
UC San Diego	California Collegiate Athletic Association (CCAA) (Division II)	Big West Conference
Dixie State	Rocky Mountain Athletic Conference (RMAC) (Division II)	Western Athletic Conference (WAC)
Kansas City	Western Athletic Conference (WAC)	Summit League
Bellarmine	Great Lakes Valley Conference (GLVC) (Division II)	ASUN Conference
UConn	American Athletic Conference	Big East Conference
Purdue Fort Wayne	Summit League	Horizon League
NJIT	ASUN Conference	America East Conference
Robert Morris	Northeast Conference	Horizon League

=== Impact of COVID-19 on season ===
For the 2020 season, several changes in how the season began, and how conference play was organized affected the 2020 season.

- The Atlantic 10 Women's Soccer Tournament, for the 2020 season only, was reduced from eight teams to four, to minimize travel and contamination.
- The Big East Conference divided into two divisions, the "East" and "Midwest" divisions to minimize travel and to regionalize conference play.
- The Big South Conference Women's Soccer Tournament, for the 2020 season only, will be reduced from six teams to four, to minimize travel and contamination.
- The Mid-American Conference discontinued its women's soccer tournament.
- The Southern Conference women's soccer tournament, for the 2020 season only, will be reduced from six teams to four, to minimize travel and contamination.
- On July 8, the Ivy League cancelled all intercollegiate sports for the 2020 Fall semester; this includes both men's and women's soccer.
- On July 10, the Big Ten and Pac-12 Conferences announced all teams would play the 2020 season with conference-only matches
- On July 13, the Patriot League announced that all fall sports, including women's soccer would be cancelled.
- On July 17, the Atlantic 10 Conference announced that all fall sports, including women's soccer, would be postponed to spring 2021.
- On August 11, 2020, the Pac-12 announced the postponement of all sports through the end of 2020.
- On August 13, the Western Athletic Conference announced that all fall sports, including women's soccer, would be postponed to spring 2021. However, the league would allow non-conference games.
- On August 13, the Southern Conference announced that conference competition in all fall sports, including women's soccer, would be suspended through the end of the calendar year.
- On August 14, the ASUN Conference announced that all fall sports, including women's soccer, would be postponed with the intent to hold them in spring 2021.
- On August 15, the NCAA suspended the women's soccer championship for the fall season, with the possibility of being played in winter or spring 2021
- On August 27, four conferences confirmed to play in the fall, with individual programs allowed to play games in the fall. The ACC, Big 12, SEC, and the Sun Belt will play in fall 2020. The other conferences will play in spring 2021.

== Fall 2020 season ==
=== Standings ===
2020 ACC women's soccer standings
	Conf.						Overall
Team	W		L		T	PCT	W		L		T	PCT
No. 2 Florida State ‍†‍‡‍^{y}	8	–	0	–	0	1.000	13	–	0	–	3	.906
No. 3 North Carolina ‍†‍‍^{y}	8	–	0	–	0	1.000	18	–	2	–	0	.900
No. 4 Virginia ‍‍‍^{y}	5	–	2	–	1	.688	14	–	4	–	3	.738
No. 6 Clemson ‍‍‍^{y}	5	–	3	–	0	.625	12	–	5	–	2	.684
No. 7 Duke ‍‍‍^{y}	4	–	2	–	2	.625	12	–	5	–	4	.667
Louisville ‍‍‍	4	–	4	–	0	.500	5	–	7	–	0	.417
Virginia Tech ‍‍‍	4	–	4	–	0	.500	8	–	9	–	0	.471
Notre Dame ‍‍‍	4	–	4	–	0	.500	6	–	7	–	0	.462
Wake Forest ‍‍‍	3	–	4	–	1	.438	5	–	7	–	2	.429
Pittsburgh ‍‍‍	3	–	5	–	0	.375	11	–	5	–	0	.688
Boston College ‍‍‍	1	–	7	–	0	.125	3	–	10	–	1	.250
Syracuse ‍‍‍	1	–	7	–	0	.125	1	–	7	–	0	.125
Miami ‍‍‍	0	–	8	–	0	.000	1	–	11	–	1	.115
NC State ‍‍‍	0	–	0	–	0	–	5	–	3	–	1	.611
† – Conference champion ‡ – 2020 ACC Tournament champion y – Invited to the NCAA Tournament; As of May 18, 2021; Rankings from United Soccer Coaches Poll; Source: The ACC; Note: † Due to COVID-19, NC State suspended the 2020 women's fall soccer season. They did participate in the spring season.

2020 American Athletic Conference women's soccer standings
	Conf.						Overall
Team	W		L		T	PCT	W		L		T	PCT
No. 15 South Florida †‡y ‍‍‍	6	–	0	–	1	.929	9	–	0	–	2	.909
Memphis y ‍‍‍	6	–	1	–	0	.857	8	–	3	–	0	.727
Cincinnati ‍‍‍	3	–	3	–	1	.500	5	–	5	–	1	.500
East Carolina ‍‍‍	3	–	3	–	2	.500	3	–	6	–	2	.364
Houston ‍‍‍	3	–	4	–	0	.429	6	–	4	–	1	.591
UCF ‍‍‍	2	–	4	–	1	.357	2	–	4	–	1	.357
Temple ‍‍‍	2	–	5	–	1	.313	4	–	5	–	1	.450
Tulsa ‍‍‍	1	–	6	–	0	.143	2	–	6	–	0	.250
SMU ‍‍‍	1	–	1	–	0	.500	1	–	1	–	0	.500
† – Conference champion ‡ – 2020 AAC Tournament champion y – Invited to the NCAA Tournament; As of April 18 2021; Rankings from United Soccer Coaches Poll; Source: American Athletic Conference

2020 Big 12 Conference women's soccer standings
	Conf.						Overall
Team	W		L		T	PCT	W		L		T	PCT
No. 3 TCU† ‍‍‍	8	–	0	–	1	.944	8	–	0	–	1	.944
No. 4 West Virginia ‍‍‍	7	–	2	–	0	.778	7	–	2	–	0	.778
No. 11 Oklahoma State ‍‍‍	6	–	2	–	1	.722	6	–	2	–	1	.722
No. 15 Kansas ‍‍‍	5	–	3	–	1	.611	5	–	3	–	1	.611
Baylor ‍‍‍	3	–	3	–	3	.500	3	–	3	–	3	.500
Texas ‍‍‍	4	–	5	–	0	.444	4	–	5	–	0	.444
Kansas State ‍‍‍	3	–	6	–	0	.333	3	–	6	–	0	.333
Texas Tech ‍‍‍	2	–	5	–	2	.333	2	–	5	–	2	.333
Iowa State ‍‍‍	2	–	6	–	1	.278	2	–	6	–	1	.278
Oklahoma ‍‍‍	0	–	8	–	1	.056	0	–	8	–	1	.056
† – Conference champion y – Invited to the NCAA tournament Rankings from United Soccer Coaches; Source

2020 SEC women's soccer standings
	Conf.						Overall
Team	W		L		T	PCT	W		L		T	PCT
East
No. 10 South Carolina ‍‍‍	6	–	2	–	0	.750	7	–	3	–	0	.700
No. 13 Tennessee ‍‍‍	4	–	3	–	1	.563	7	–	4	–	1	.625
Vanderbilt ‍†‍‍	4	–	4	–	0	.500	8	–	4	–	0	.667
Missouri ‍‍‍	3	–	2	–	2	.571	5	–	3	–	2	.600
Georgia ‍‍‍	2	–	3	–	2	.429	3	–	4	–	2	.444
Kentucky ‍‍‍	1	–	4	–	3	.313	1	–	5	–	3	.278
Florida ‍‍‍	1	–	6	–	1	.188	3	–	7	–	2	.333
West
No. 7 Arkansas ‍‍‍	7	–	1	–	0	.875	10	–	3	–	0	.769
No. 8 Texas A&M ‍‍‍	7	–	1	–	0	.875	8	–	2	–	0	.800
No. 14 Ole Miss ‍‍‍	4	–	4	–	0	.500	6	–	5	–	0	.545
Auburn ‍‍‍	3	–	3	–	2	.500	5	–	4	–	3	.542
Mississippi State ‍‍‍	2	–	3	–	3	.438	3	–	4	–	3	.450
Alabama ‍‍‍	2	–	4	–	2	.375	4	–	5	–	2	.455
LSU ‍‍‍	0	–	6	–	2	.125	4	–	7	–	3	.393
† – Conference champion ‡ – 2020 SEC Tournament champion As of March 4, 2021; Rankings from United Soccer Coaches Poll; Source: SEC

2020 Sun Belt Conference women's soccer standings
	Conf.						Overall
Team	W		L		T	PCT	W		L		T	PCT
East
South Alabama ‍†‍‍	8	–	2	–	0	.800	10	–	3	–	1	.750
Georgia State ‍‍‍	6	–	2	–	2	.700	10	–	3	–	2	.733
Coastal Carolina ‍‍‍	6	–	4	–	0	.600	6	–	5	–	0	.545
Appalachian State ‍‍‍	4	–	6	–	0	.400	5	–	9	–	1	.367
Georgia Southern ‍‍‍	3	–	6	–	1	.350	3	–	10	–	1	.250
Troy ‍‍‍	1	–	8	–	1	.150	2	–	9	–	1	.208
West
Arkansas State ‍†‍‍	7	–	0	–	1	.938	10	–	2	–	1	.808
Louisiana ‍‍‍	4	–	3	–	1	.563	9	–	5	–	1	.633
Texas State ‍‍‍	4	–	4	–	0	.500	4	–	9	–	1	.321
Little Rock ‍‍‍	3	–	3	–	2	.500	4	–	5	–	3	.458
Louisiana–Monroe ‍‍‍	0	–	8	–	0	.000	0	–	10	–	0	.000
† – Conference champion ‡ – 2020 Sun Belt Tournament champion As of November 12, 2020; Rankings from United Soccer Coaches Poll; Source: Sun Belt Conference

2020 WAC women's soccer standings
	Conf.						Overall
Team	W		L		T	PCT	W		L		T	PCT
Seattle ‍†‍‍	10	–	2	–	2	.786	12	–	5	–	2	.684
Utah Valley ‍‍‡‍^{y}	10	–	2	–	2	.786	12	–	5	–	2	.684
California Baptist ‍‍‍	8	–	4	–	2	.643	10	–	4	–	3	.676
Grand Canyon ‍‍‍	7	–	4	–	1	.625	8	–	9	–	1	.472
UTRGV ‍‍‍	7	–	6	–	1	.536	10	–	7	–	2	.579
New Mexico State ‍‍‍	4	–	9	–	1	.321	5	–	12	–	2	.316
Dixie State* ‍‍‍	3	–	8	–	1	.292	3	–	10	–	2	.267
Chicago State ‍‍‍	0	–	14	–	0	.000	0	–	17	–	0	.000
† – Conference champion ‡ – 2020 WAC Tournament champion y – Invited to the NCAA Tournament * ineligible for the 2020 NCAA Tournament due to transition from Division II; As of April 20, 2021; Rankings from United Soccer Coaches Poll; Source:WAC

== Spring 2021 season ==
=== Standings ===
2020 WAC women's soccer standings
	Conf.						Overall
Team	W		L		T	PCT	W		L		T	PCT
Seattle ‍†‍‍	10	–	2	–	2	.786	12	–	5	–	2	.684
Utah Valley ‍‍‡‍^{y}	10	–	2	–	2	.786	12	–	5	–	2	.684
California Baptist ‍‍‍	8	–	4	–	2	.643	10	–	4	–	3	.676
Grand Canyon ‍‍‍	7	–	4	–	1	.625	8	–	9	–	1	.472
UTRGV ‍‍‍	7	–	6	–	1	.536	10	–	7	–	2	.579
New Mexico State ‍‍‍	4	–	9	–	1	.321	5	–	12	–	2	.316
Dixie State* ‍‍‍	3	–	8	–	1	.292	3	–	10	–	2	.267
Chicago State ‍‍‍	0	–	14	–	0	.000	0	–	17	–	0	.000
† – Conference champion ‡ – 2020 WAC Tournament champion y – Invited to the NCAA Tournament * ineligible for the 2020 NCAA Tournament due to transition from Division II; As of April 20, 2021; Rankings from United Soccer Coaches Poll; Source:WAC

== Statistics ==
=== Individual statistics ===
Source: NCAA.com

Goals
Rank	Scorer	School	Games	Goals
1				
2				
3				
3				
5				
6				
6				
6				
6				
6				

Goals Against Average
Rank	Keeper	School	Games	Minutes	GA	GAA
1						
2						
3						
4						
5						
6						
7						
8						
9						
10						

Assists
Rank	Player	School	Games	Assists
1				
2				
3				
3				
3				
6				
6				
6				
6				
6				

Save Percentage
Rank	Keeper	School	Games	Minutes	Saves	GA	Save %
1							
2							
3							
4							
5							
6							
7							
8							
9							
10							

Points
Rank	Player	School	Games	Goals	Assists	Points
1						
2						
3						
4						
5						
6						
7						
8						
9						
10						

Saves
Rank	Keeper	School	Games	Saves
1				
2				
3				
4				
5				
6				
7				
8				
9				
10				

- Individual statistics are through the games of September 28, 2020

== See also ==
- College soccer
- Impact of the COVID-19 pandemic on association football
- List of NCAA Division I women's soccer programs
- 2020 in American soccer
- 2020 NCAA Division I Women's Soccer Tournament
- 2020 NCAA Division I men's soccer season
