= Mackenzie George =

American soccer player (born 1999)

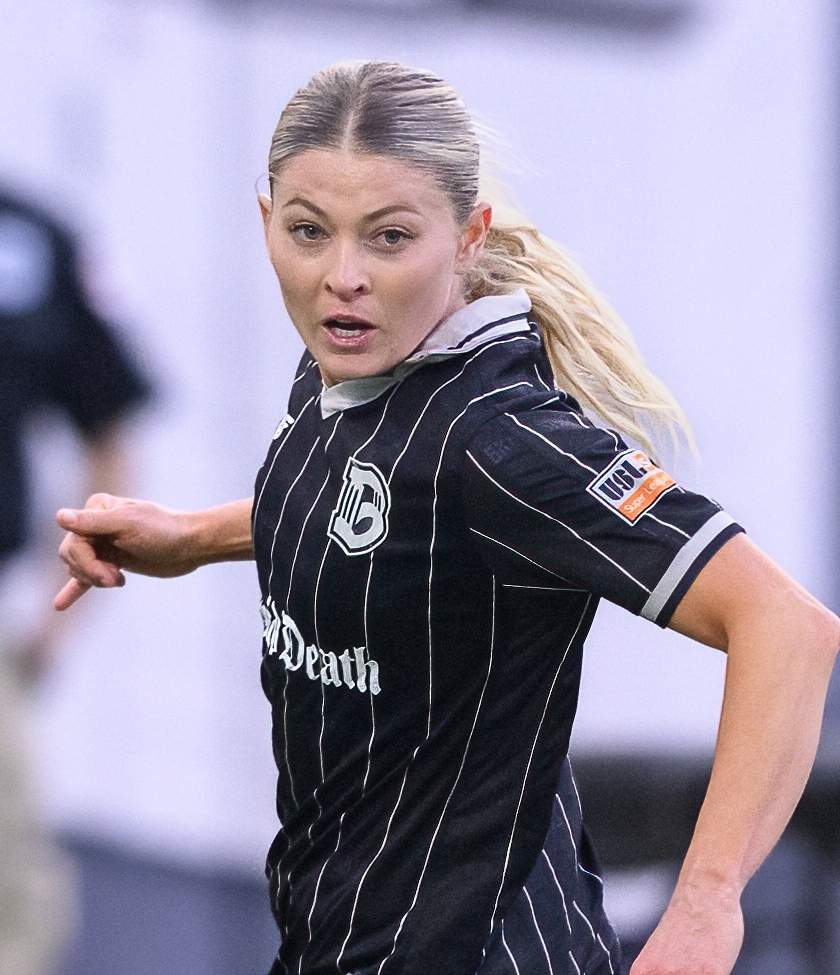
- George with Brooklyn FC in 2025

Personal information
- Full name: Mackenzie Marie George
- Date of birth: March 10, 1999 (age 27)
- Place of birth: Lincoln, California, United States
- Height: 5 ft 4 in (1.63 m)
- Position: Forward

Team information
- Current team: Carolina Ascent
- Number: 31

College career
Years	Team	Apps	(Gls)
2018	Cal Poly Mustangs	19	(2)
2019–2022	Tennessee Volunteers	73	(15)

Senior career*
Years	Team	Apps	(Gls)
2023	FH	23	(3)
2024–2025	Brooklyn FC	28	(4)
2025–	Carolina Ascent	28	(3)
- * Club domestic league appearances and goals as of May 24, 2026

Mackenzie Marie George (born March 10, 1999) is an American professional soccer player who plays as a forward for USL Super League club Carolina Ascent. She played college soccer for the Cal Poly Mustangs and the Tennessee Volunteers.

== Early life ==
George attended and graduated from Woodcreek High School in Roseville, California. George was one of 24 players invited to a USWNT U-19 camp in May 2018.

== College career ==
=== Cal Poly Mustangs ===
George began her college soccer career at Cal Poly, where she played and started in all 19 games as a freshman. She earned the 2018 Big West Conference Freshman of the Year award.

=== Tennessee Volunteers ===
George transferred to the University of Tennessee in her sophomore year. During the 2020 season, George scored a brace against in-state rivals, Vanderbilt, in the quarterfinals of the 2020 SEC Tournament but would go on to eventually lose 2–4.

In 2021, George played a key role in Tennessee's 8–2–0 conference season while winning the SEC East division in back to back seasons. George also contributed to Tennessee's victory in the 2021 SEC tournament, Tennessee's first title since 2008. Tennessee qualified for the 2021 NCAA tournament, their first appearance since 2018. Tennessee made it to the Round of 16, but lost 0–3 against Michigan State.

In 2022, Tennessee went 7–2–1 in conference play, losing to Georgia in the SEC Tournament quarterfinals. Tennessee's season ended in the first round of the NCAA Tournament with a loss to Xavier in double overtime.

== Club career ==
=== FH ===
After going undrafted in the 2023 NWSL Draft, George joined Icelandic side FH. She scored her first club and professional goal, on August 10, 2023, against Keflavík ÍF scoring the equalizer in a 1–1 draw.

=== Brooklyn FC ===
On August 6, 2024, George was announced as a new signing for Brooklyn FC before the USL Super League's inaugural season. She made her first appearance in Brooklyn's inaugural match against Spokane on September 8, 2024. She scored her first club goal during Brooklyn's home debut, scoring the second goal in the 38th minute against the Dallas Trinity in a 2–0 win. She started all 28 games and led Brooklyn in points with 4 goals and 5 assists. She was named to the USL Super League All-League Second Team after the inaugural season.

=== Carolina Ascent ===
On July 16, 2025, the Carolina Ascent acquired George in a transfer with Brooklyn FC. She scored her first goals for the club on September 28, scoring twice in a 4–3 loss to league newcomers Sporting JAX. She finished her debut season with 3 goals and 2 assists 28 games. In the playoff semifinals, she scored the only goal against Sporting JAX to reach the final.

== Personal life ==
George graduated from the University of Tennessee with a bachelor's degree in Animal Science in May 2023.

== Career statistics ==
=== College ===
College	Regular Season				SEC Tournament		NCAA Tournament		Total	
College	Conference	Season	Apps	Goals	Apps	Goals	Apps	Goals	Apps	Goals
Cal Poly Mutangs	BWC	2018	19	2	—		—		19	2
Tennessee Volunteers	SEC	2019	18	1	—		—		18	1
Tennessee Volunteers	SEC	2020–21	14	2	1	2	—		15	4
Tennessee Volunteers	SEC	2021	17	5	3	1	3	0	23	6
Tennessee Volunteers	SEC	2022	15	4	1	0	1	0	17	4
Career total			83	14	5	3	4	0	92	17

=== Club ===
As of February 15, 2025

Club	Season	League			League Cup		Playoffs		Total	
Club	Season	Division	Apps	Goals	Apps	Goals	Apps	Goals	Apps	Goals
Fimleikafélag Hafnarfjarðar	2023	Besta deild kvenna	23	3	3	1	—		26	4
Brooklyn FC	2024–25	USL Super League	14	3	—		0	0	14	3
Career total			37	6	3	1	0	0	40	7

== Honors and awards ==
Tennessee Volunteers

- SEC women's soccer tournament: 2021

Individual

- USL Super League All-League Second Team: 2024–25, 2025–26
- First-team All-SEC: 2021
- Second-team All-SEC: 2020, 2022
- Big West Freshman of the Year: 2018
- SEC tournament all-tournament team: 2021
