= Abi Brighton =

American soccer player (born 2002)

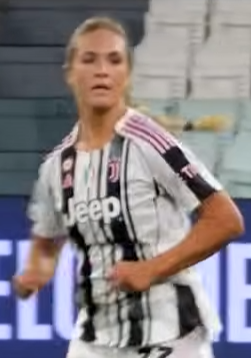
- Brighton with Juventus in 2025

Personal information
- Full name: Abigail Crosby Brighton
- Date of birth: March 29, 2002 (age 24)
- Place of birth: Hilton Head Island, South Carolina, U.S.
- Position: Central midfielder

Team information
- Current team: AC Milan (on loan from Juventus)
- Number: 32

Youth career
- Tormenta FC

College career
Years	Team	Apps	(Gls)
2020–2024	Vanderbilt Commodores	93	(10)

Senior career*
Years	Team	Apps	(Gls)
2025–	Juventus	24	(1)
2026–	→ AC Milan (loan)	0	(0)

International career^{‡}
2025	United States U–23	4	(0)
- * Club domestic league appearances and goals as of September 19, 2026 ‡ National team caps and goals as of December 2, 2025

Abigail Crosby Brighton (born March 29, 2002) is an American professional soccer player who plays as a midfielder for Serie A Women club AC Milan, on loan from Juventus. She played college soccer for the Vanderbilt Commodores, earning third-team All-American honors in 2024.

== Early life ==
Brighton was born in Hilton Head Island, South Carolina, to John and Stephanie Brighton, and raised in Hilton Head Island, South Carolina. She has an older brother, James, who played college soccer for Clemson. Brighton attended Heritage Academy in Hilton Head, where she captained the soccer team from 2012 to 2018. She played club soccer for Tormenta FC.

== College career ==
Brighton was a five-year starter for the Vanderbilt Commodores, scoring 10 goals and making 15 assists in 93 appearances (92 starts). In her freshman season in 2020, which was shortened by the COVID-19 pandemic, she helped lead Vanderbilt to their first SEC tournament title since 1994. In the opening round, she scored and assisted in a 4–2 win against Mississippi State (her rocket against Mississippi State made SportsCenter's top 10 plays), and she scored the last goal in a 3–1 victory over Arkansas in the final. Vanderbilt lost to Penn State in their opening game in the NCAA tournament. She finished the season with 3 goals and 2 assists in 16 games and was named to the SEC all-freshman team.

Brighton made a career-high five assists in 21 games in her junior season in 2022, including the tying assist in a 1–1 draw against Arkansas in the quarterfinals of the SEC tournament, before making her penalty kick as they advanced in a shootout. In the NCAA tournament, she assisted the only goal in a 1–0 win against Clemson in the first round before losing to Northwestern in the next game. She became team captain of the Commodores in her senior year. She returned for a fifth and final season (granted to college athletes because of the pandemic) in 2024. In her last NCAA tournament, she led Vanderbilt to an upset win against top-seeded defending champions Florida State in the second round, assisting on the second goal in a 3–3 draw and making the winning penalty kick in the ensuing shootout. Vanderbilt lost to Penn State in the next round. Described as "arguably the spine of the team" for her facilitating play, Brighton was named to the All-SEC second team in her last two seasons and third-team United Soccer Coaches All-American in her last season.

== Club career ==
On January 8, 2025, Serie A Femminile club Juventus announced the signing of Brighton to her first professional contract on a two-and-a-half-year deal. She made her professional debut three days later as a second-half substitute for Eva Schatzer in a 3–0 win over Sampdoria. She made her first professional start in a 6–0 win over AC Milan on February 9. She was subsequently a regular starter as Juventus clinched their sixth league title. On May 17, she started in a 4–0 win over Roma in the Coppa Italia final, completing a domestic double.

On September 9, 2025, Brighton signed a one-year contract extension with Juventus, committing her future with the club until 2028. On September 27, she started in the Serie A Women's Cup final against Roma, which Juventus won 3–2. On October 7, she made her UEFA Women's Champions League debut in a 2–1 win over Benfica. On February 22, 2026, she scored her first professional goal to open the scoring in a 2–2 draw with Ternana.

On September 24, 2026, Brighton was sent on a season-long loan to fellow Italian club AC Milan.

== International career ==
Brighton was called into United States national under-14 team training camp in 2016, and later invited to virtual camp at the under-20 level in 2021. She was called into training camp with the United States under-23 team, practicing concurrently with the senior national team, in March 2025.

== Honors and awards ==
Vanderbilt Commodores

- SEC women's soccer tournament: 2020

Juventus

- Serie A: 2024–25
- Coppa Italia: 2024–25
- Serie A Women's Cup: 2025, 2026
- Supercoppa Italiana: 2025

Individual

- Third-team All-American: 2024
- Second-team All-SEC: 2023, 2024
- SEC all-freshman team: 2020
- SEC tournament all-tournament team: 2020
