= 2020 WAC women's soccer tournament =

- Classification: Division I
- Teams: 6
- Matches: 5
- Site: GCU Stadium; Phoenix, AZ
- Champions: Utah Valley (3rd title)
- Winning coach: Chris Lemay (2nd title)
- MVP: Cassidy McCormick (Utah Valley)
- Broadcast: WAC Digital Network

2020 WAC women's soccer standings
	Conf.						Overall
Team	W		L		T	PCT	W		L		T	PCT
Seattle ‍†‍‍	10	–	2	–	2	.786	12	–	5	–	2	.684
Utah Valley ‍‍‡‍^{y}	10	–	2	–	2	.786	12	–	5	–	2	.684
California Baptist ‍‍‍	8	–	4	–	2	.643	10	–	4	–	3	.676
Grand Canyon ‍‍‍	7	–	4	–	1	.625	8	–	9	–	1	.472
UTRGV ‍‍‍	7	–	6	–	1	.536	10	–	7	–	2	.579
New Mexico State ‍‍‍	4	–	9	–	1	.321	5	–	12	–	2	.316
Dixie State* ‍‍‍	3	–	8	–	1	.292	3	–	10	–	2	.267
Chicago State ‍‍‍	0	–	14	–	0	.000	0	–	17	–	0	.000
† – Conference champion ‡ – 2020 WAC Tournament champion y – Invited to the NCAA Tournament * ineligible for the 2020 NCAA Tournament due to transition from Division II; As of April 20, 2021; Rankings from United Soccer Coaches Poll; Source:WAC

The 2020 Western Athletic Conference women's soccer tournament, delayed due to COVID-19 until Spring, 2021, was the postseason women's soccer tournament for the Western Athletic Conference held from April 13 to April 17, 2021. The five match tournament took place at GCU Stadium in Phoenix, AZ on the campus of Grand Canyon University. The six-team single-elimination tournament consisted of three rounds based on seeding from regular season conference play. The No. 1 seed Utah Valley defeated No. 2 seed Seattle Redhawks 1–0 in the final.

== Bracket ==
First round Tuesday, Apr. 13
4	UTRGV	0
5	NMSU	3
3	Grand Canyon	5
6	Chicago State	2

Semifinals; Thursday, Apr. 15
1	Utah Valley	1^{2OT, 4PK}
5	NMSU	1 ^{3PK}
2	Seattle	3
3	Grand Canyon	2

Final; Saturday, Apr. 17
1	Utah Valley	1
2	Seattle	0

== All-Tournament team ==
Player	Team
Corey Kizer	NM State
Hannah Leitner	NM State
Jaycee Iranshad	Grand Canyon
Raeanne Jones	Grand Canyon
Michele Adam	Seattle
Ava Benedetti	Seattle
Hallie Bergford	Seattle
Isabel Jones-Dawe	Utah Valley
Anna Pickering	Utah Valley
Heather Stainbrook	Utah Valley
**Cassidy McCormick**	Utah Valley

MVP in bold
