= Parker Goins =

American soccer player (born 1998)

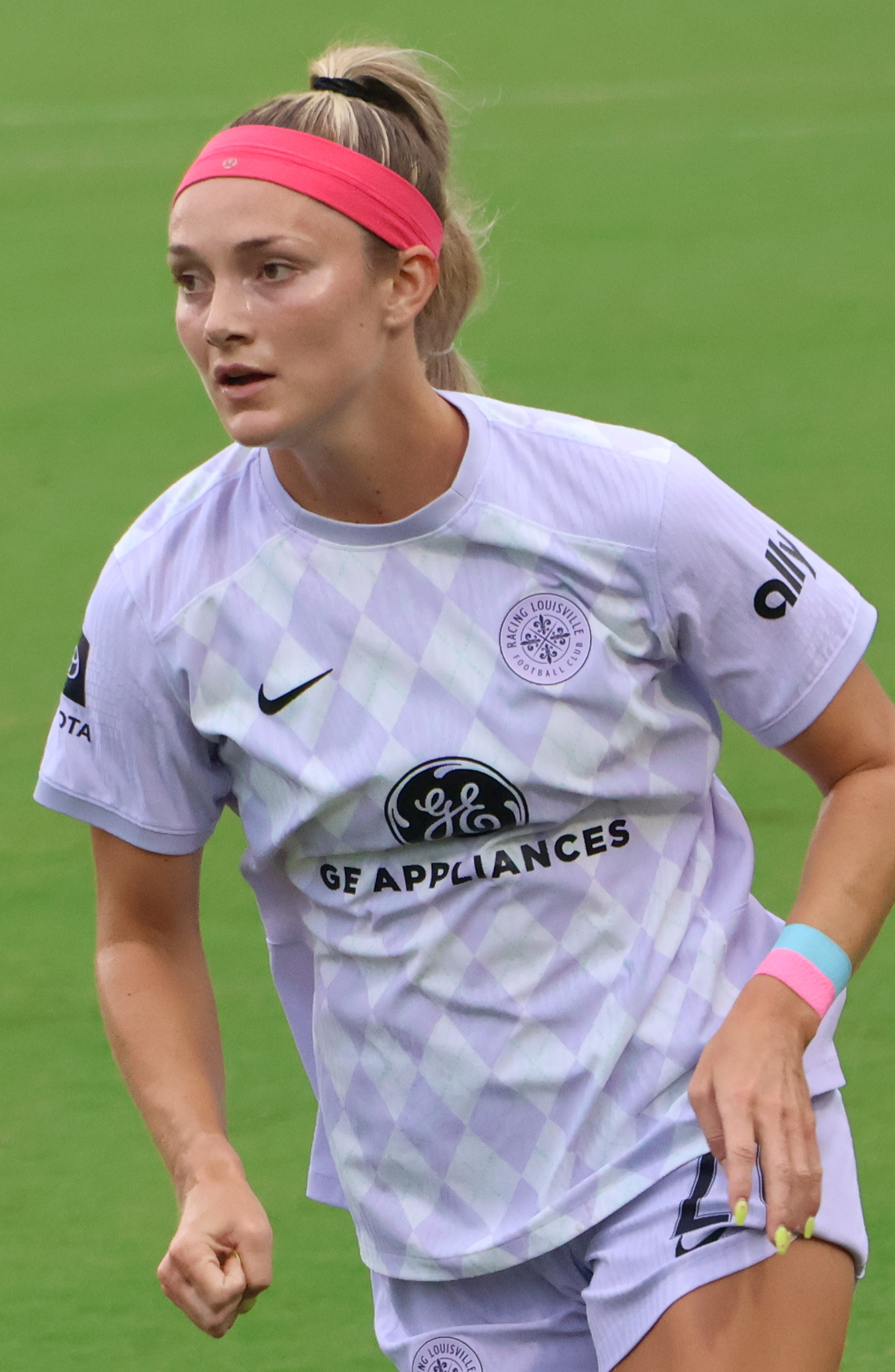
- Goins with Racing Louisville FC in 2024

Personal information
- Full name: Kennedy Parker Goins
- Date of birth: December 8, 1998 (age 27)
- Place of birth: Broken Arrow, Oklahoma, U.S.
- Height: 5 ft 10 in (1.78 m)
- Position: Forward

Team information
- Current team: Tampa Bay Sun
- Number: 11

Youth career
- Tulsa SC Hurricane
- 2014–2017: Union High School

College career
Years	Team	Apps	(Gls)
2017–2021	Arkansas Razorbacks	96	(40)

Senior career*
Years	Team	Apps	(Gls)
2022–2024	Racing Louisville	31	(4)
2025–	Tampa Bay Sun	24	(2)

International career
2016	United States U-18		
- * Club domestic league appearances and goals as of 00:33, November 7, 2026 (UTC)

Kennedy Parker Goins (/ˈɡoʊ.ɪns/ GO-ins; born December 8, 1998) is an American professional soccer player who plays as a forward for Tampa Bay Sun FC in the USL Super League. A native of Broken Arrow, Oklahoma, she is a three-time OSSAA state champion and played college soccer at Arkansas.

== Early life ==
Goins was born on December 8, 1998, in Broken Arrow, Oklahoma, and attended Union High School in Tulsa. She played a part in Union's back-to-back undefeated seasons in 2015 and 2016, her sophomore and junior seasons, respectively, as the team won the OSSAA 6A state championship both years and 2017 too. She missed a portion of her junior year playing for the under-18 women's national team, with whom she traveled to Spain. She participated in team camp with the U.S. team prior to the 2018 FIFA U-20 Women's World Cup, one of three high school players to earn such a distinction. Coming out of high school, Goins was rated as a four-star recruit by TopDrawerSoccer.com and was the No. 26 ranked player nationally by IMG Academy. Goins also played club soccer for TSC Hurricanes, whom she led in scoring for three seasons.

In high school and club soccer, Goins played alongside Taylor Malham; she went on to play with Malham at Arkansas and professionally in Louisville.

== College career ==
Goins began her career at Arkansas in 2017. She started 21 matches out of the 23 in which she played, and led the team with nine goals scored on the year. She scored her first collegiate goal on August 27, 2017, in a match against Abilene Christian in which she scored a total of four times. This made her the 12th Razorback player to total four goals in one game and the first to achieve the mark since 2001. She scored three game-winning goals during the season, and scored a goal to equalize in the 2017 SEC Tournament championship against Texas A&M, though the Aggies scored a game-winner of their own seven minutes later to take the title.

Goins started all of the first ten matches of her sophomore season, scoring two goals, before suffering an ACL tear on September 20, 2018, in a game where Arkansas upset No. 2 Texas A&M. The first of her two goals in 2018 was a game-winner against Florida Atlantic, with the other goal coming two days later against UConn. During her junior year, Goins started in all 23 matches the Razorbacks played, finishing second on the team in both goals, with ten, and assists, with nine. These goals included one against No. 1 North Carolina (the first win over a No. 1 ranked team in school history for Arkansas), a game-winner against No. 15 Vanderbilt, and a goal in the NCAA Tournament against North Texas.

In her senior season, Goins started in all 16 Arkansas matches, leading the squad with a total of eight goals. She scored two game-winning goals for the Razorbacks, with the second coming on May 1, 2021, in Arkansas' defeat of Utah Valley in the NCAA Tournament. She was named a third-team All-American by United Soccer Coaches. She finished her college career with several other accolades: she was named first-team All-SEC every year from 2019 to 2021 and was a member of the SEC All-Tournament Team in her senior year.

== Professional career ==
Goins was drafted by Racing Louisville FC with their first pick of the third round in the 2021 NWSL Draft. She opted to play the remainder of the 2021 spring schedule with Arkansas before signing with Louisville. She made her professional debut on April 24, 2022, as Louisville fell to the Houston Dash in the NWSL Challenge Cup. Louisville announced on January 8, 2025, that Goins had entered free agency.

On January 10, 2025, Goins joined Tampa Bay Sun FC of the USL Super League. On February 15, 2025, Goins scored her first club goal in the 50th minute after coming on at halftime.

== Career statistics ==
=== Club ===
As of October 17, 2025

Club	Season	League			NWSL Challenge Cup		Continental		Total	
Club	Season	Division	Apps	Goals	Apps	Goals	Apps	Goals	Apps	Goals
Racing Louisville	2022	NWSL	7	0	1	0	—		8	0
Racing Louisville	2023	NWSL	10	1	5	2	—		15	3
Racing Louisville	2024	NWSL	14	1	0	0	2	0	16	1
Tampa Bay Sun FC	2024–25	USL Super League	17	2	—		—		17	2
Tampa Bay Sun FC	2026	USL Super League	7	0	—		—		7	0
Career total			55	4	6	2	2	0	63	6

== Honors ==
Tampa Bay Sun

- USL Super League: 2024–25
