= Wes Hart =

American soccer player and coach (born 1977)

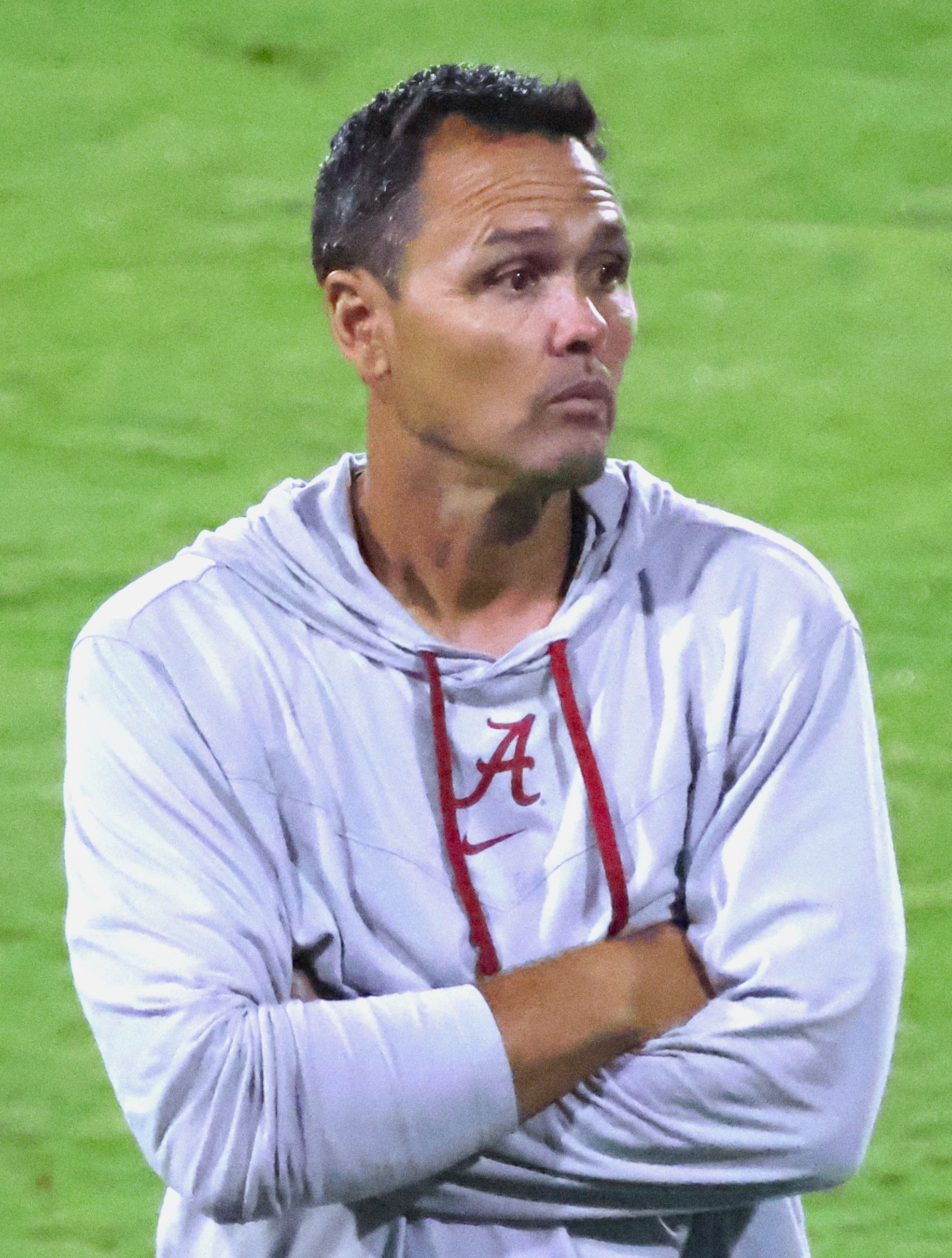
- Hart with Alabama in 2025

Personal information
- Date of birth: September 14, 1977 (age 49)
- Place of birth: Hollister, California, United States
- Height: 5 ft 7 in (1.70 m)
- Position: Defender

Team information
- Current team: Alabama (Head Coach)

Youth career
- 1996–1997: University of Wisconsin–Madison
- 1998–1999: University of Washington

Senior career*
| Years | Team | Apps | (Gls) |
| 2000–2003 | Colorado Rapids | 67 | (2) |
| 2000 | → MLS Pro-40 (loan) | 2 | (3) |
| 2004–2005 | San Jose Earthquakes | 25 | (0) |
| Total | | 94 | (5) |

Managerial career
- 2013–2014: Florida State (assistant)
- 2015–: Alabama
- * Club domestic league appearances and goals

Wes Hart (born September 14, 1977, in Hollister, California) is an American soccer coach and former player who is the head coach of the Alabama Crimson Tide women's soccer team. Hart played six seasons in Major League Soccer as a defender with the Colorado Rapids and San Jose Earthquakes.

== Playing career ==
Hart grew up in Littleton, Colorado, attending Columbine High School where he was a Parade Magazine and NSCAA High School All American soccer player. He was also a highly successful high school wrestler, qualifying for the state tournament. He then entered the University of Wisconsin–Madison (1996–1997) and at the University of Washington (1998–1999). He was a 1998 third-team and 1999 second-team All-American. Hart was selected seventh overall in the 2000 MLS SuperDraft by the Colorado Rapids. In his first two years with the Rapids, Hart missed the beginning of each season due to injuries. The team did send him on loan with the MLS Project 40 team in 2000. However, the following two seasons saw Hart return from injury where he was able to play a more substantial role with team. Before the beginning of the 2004 season, Hart was traded to the San Jose Earthquakes from the Rapids for a conditional pick in the 2005 MLS SuperDraft. Hart saw a more limited role with the Quakes, appearing in less than half the games. After appearing in seven games in 2005, he was released on August 4, 2005.
