= Wasila Diwura-Soale =

Ghanaian footballer (born 1996)

Personal information
- Full name: Wasila Diwura-Soale
- Date of birth: 1 September 1996 (age 30)
- Place of birth: Tamale, Ghana
- Height: 1.57 m (5 ft 2 in)
- Position: Midfielder

Youth career
- Hasaacas Ladies

College career
Years	Team	Apps	(Gls)
2017–2018	Navarro Bulldogs	36	(30)
2019	Lamar Lady Cardinals	4	(0)
2020–2022	LSU Tigers	59	(5)

Senior career*
Years	Team	Apps	(Gls)
2012–2015	Hasaacas Ladies		
2022	Wake FC	12	(1)
2024	Decatur FC	4	(1)
2024–2025	Tampa Bay Sun	11	(0)

International career
2012–2013	Ghana U17	6	(0)
2014–2016	Ghana U20	6	(1)
2016–	Ghana	3	(0)
- * Club domestic league appearances and goals as of 30 June 2025

Wasila Diwura-Soale (born 1 September 1996) is a Ghanaian professional footballer who plays as a midfielder for the Ghana national team.

Diwura-Soale played for Ghana at U-17 level in 2012 and was part of the Black Maidens squad that placed third at the 2012 World Cup in Azerbaijan. She also featured for the Ghana U-20 team, the Black Princesses, at the 2014 and 2016 World Cups in Canada and Papua New Guinea respectively.

== Club career ==
Diwura-Soale started her professional football career with Ghana Women’s Premier League club Hasaacas Ladies. During her time with the club, she won the league in three consecutive seasons between 2012 and 2015. During her time she played along players like Jennifer Cudjoe, Janet Egyir, Elizabeth Cudjoe and Lily Niber-Lawrence.

Diwura-Soale played for Wake FC during the 2022 USL W League season.

On 10 June 2024, it was announced that Diwura-Soale had signed with Tampa Bay Sun ahead of the inaugural USL Super League season.

== College career ==
=== Navarro Bulldogs, 2017–2018 ===
In 2017, Diwura-Soale moved to the United States at the back of her performances with the Ghana U20 at the 2016 FIFA U-20 Women's World Cup. She joined Navarro College in Corsicana, Texas, for head coach Alicia Wilson. Wilson convinced Diwura-Soale to pursue a degree as part of her preparations into going professional after she had wanted to pursue a professional football career right away. In her first season, she accumulated 36 points in the as she scored 12 goals including 4 match winning goals and made 12 assists in 17 games.

The following season, she improved on her previous season by accumulating 52 points through 18 goals including 5 match winning goals and 16 assists in 19 games to help them reach the National Junior College Athletic Association (NJCAA). Her most notable performance was on 5 September 2018 when she scored five goals and made three assists in a 11–0 victory over Northeast Texas. In her two-year stint with the Bulldogs, she was a two-time, NJCAA First Team All-American, making her only the third Navarro player in history to earn that honour. In total she accumulated 88 points, scored 30 goals, nine game-winning goals and made 28 assists in 36 games in her two seasons at Navarro. In May 2018, she made Navarro College spring President’s and Dean’s Lists for her academic achievement.

=== Lamar Lady Cardinals, 2019 ===
After two seasons with Navarro, she transferred to Lamar University where she joined the Lamar Lady Cardinals in 2019. She had a good start at Lamar by starting in the first four matches and providing one assist however her season was curtailed after she picked up an injury that side lined her for the rest of the 2019 season. During her recovery period she considered quitting football.

=== LSU Tigers, 2020–2022 ===
In May 2020, she transferred to Louisiana State University and joined the LSU Tigers team, becoming the first African football player to play for the Tigers. She made an immediate impact on the team in her first season, playing 19 games whilst making 4 assists, the highest on the team. In August 2021, she graduated from Louisiana State University with a bachelor's degree in humanities and social science. Diwura-Soale graduated with a degree in interdisciplinary studies in August 2021.

== International career ==
=== Youth ===
Diwura-Soale made her youth debut for Ghana for the under-17s in 2012. In October 2012, Diwura-Soale was part of the Ghana under-17 team who finished in third place by beating Germany in the third place match at the 2012 FIFA U-17 Women's World Cup in Azerbaijan. At the competition she played five out of the six games.

In 2014, she was part of the Under-20 team that played at the 2014 FIFA U-20 Women's World Cup in Canada. The following year, Diwura-Soale played a key role in 2015 African U-20 Women's World Cup Qualifying Tournament, helping Ghana to qualify for the 2016 FIFA U-20 Women's World Cup in Papua New Guinea. She made the final squad for the world cup and played in all three group stage matches as Ghana were eliminated at that stage.

=== Senior ===
In July 2016, Diwura-Soale was called up to the senior team by Yusif Basigi for a friendly match against Germany. On 22 July 2016, she made her debut for the Black Queens in a humiliating 11–0 defeat to Germany, she started the match, played 51 minutes before being substituted for Mary Essiful. After a four-year national hiatus, Diwura-Soale earned a call up to senior national team in July 2021 ahead of the Aisha Buhari Cup and 2022 Africa Women Cup of Nations qualifiers against Nigeria. She played the first match of the Aisha Buhari Cup against South African women's national team on 17 September 2021, which Ghana lost by 3–0.

== Honours ==
Hasaacas Ladies

- Ghana Women's Premier League: 2012–13, 2013–14, 2014–15

Tampa Bay Sun

- USL Super League: 2024–25

Ghana U17

- FIFA U-17 Women's World Cup third place: 2012

Individual

- NCAA All-Region Team: 2022
- All-SEC Second Team: 2022
- NJCAA First Team All-American: 2017, 2018
