= Alabama Soccer Stadium =

Soccer stadium in Alabama, United States

- Interactive map of Alabama Soccer Stadium
- Address: 500 Peter Bryce Blvd; Tuscaloosa, AL; United States
- Coordinates: 33°12′38.69″N 87°31′57.57″W
- Owner: University of Alabama
- Operator: Univ. of Alabama Athletics
- Capacity: 1,500
- Type: Soccer-specific stadium
- Surface: Grass

Construction
- Opened: August 27, 2004; 22 years ago

Tenant
- Alabama women's soccer (2004-present)

Website
- rolltide.com/soccer-stadium

The Alabama Soccer Stadium is a soccer-specific stadium located in Tuscaloosa, Alabama, owned and operated by the University of Alabama. Opened in 2004, it serves as home for the Alabama Crimson Tide women's soccer team.

The complex features covered bench areas for both teams and a press box with seating for 1,500 spectators and standing room for many more. The University of Alabama soccer field was the first home of Alabama soccer and it saw its first action on Oct. 2, 1994, as Alabama played Furman University. The Tide has compiled a 109-56-11 overall record on campus and a 36-29-4 ledger since playing at the Alabama Soccer Complex.

Upon the renovation of Bryant–Denny Stadium the soccer field received a new high definition scoreboard, which was previously housed in Bryant-Denny. The scoreboard is the biggest in the nation for a college soccer field.
