= Reyna Reyes =

Mexican footballer (born 2001)

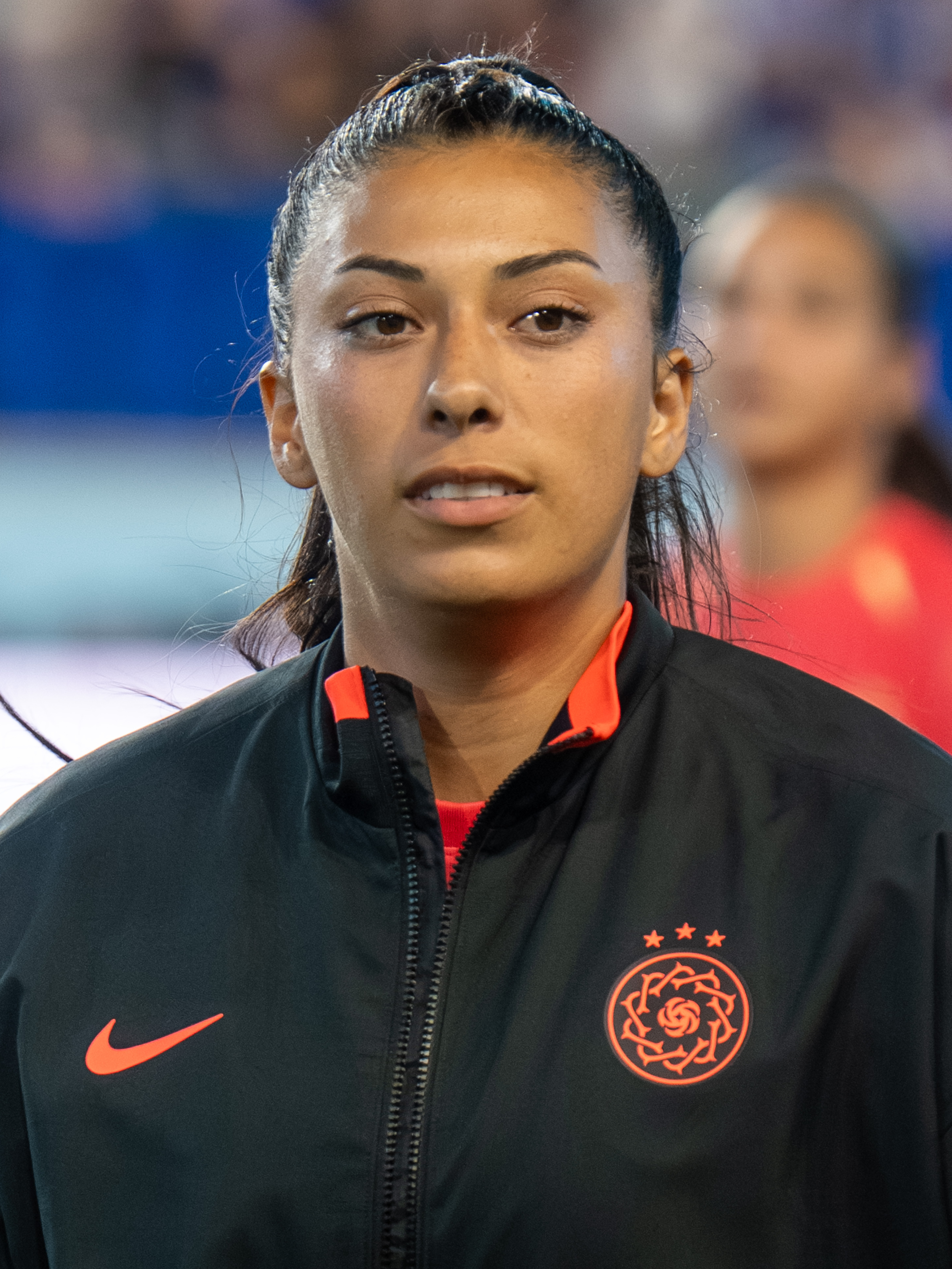
- Reyes with the Portland Thorns in 2025

Personal information
- Full name: Reyna René Reyes Stubblefield
- Date of birth: 16 February 2001 (age 25)
- Place of birth: Garland, Texas, United States
- Height: 1.70 m (5 ft 7 in)
- Position: Full-back

Team information
- Current team: Portland Thorns
- Number: 2

Youth career
- Naaman Forest Rangers

College career
Years	Team	Apps	(Gls)
2019–2022	Alabama Crimson Tide	79	(16)

Senior career*
Years	Team	Apps	(Gls)
2023–	Portland Thorns	94	(4)

International career^{‡}
2016–2018	Mexico U17	15	(1)
2019	Mexico U19	4	(2)
2020	Mexico U20	6	(1)
2021–	Mexico	16	(0)
- * Club domestic league appearances and goals as of 11 November 2026 ‡ National team caps and goals as of 2 March 2025

Reyna René Reyes Stubblefield (born 16 February 2001) is a professional footballer who plays as a full-back for Portland Thorns of the National Women's Soccer League (NWSL). Born in the United States, Reyes plays for the Mexico national team. She played college soccer for the Alabama Crimson Tide and was drafted fifth overall by the Thorns in the 2023 NWSL Draft.

== Early life and college career ==
Reyes was born and raised in Garland, Texas, to a Mexican father and an American mother. She attended Naaman Forest High School in Garland.

=== Alabama Crimson Tide ===
Reyes committed to play college soccer for the University of Alabama, making her debut for the Crimson Tide on 23 August 2019 in a 1–0 defeat vs. BYU. Reyes was a key member of a formidable Alabama team, which included: Felicia Knox, Ashlynn Serepca, Riley Parker and Riley Tanner.

== Club career ==
=== Portland Thorns ===
On 12 January 2023, Portland Thorns FC of the National Women's Soccer League selected Reyes with the fifth overall pick in the 2023 NWSL Draft. However, she was prohibited by league rules from negotiating a contract until she was sufficiently recovered from a preseason injury to train with the Thorns.

On 25 March 2023, Reyes signed a two-year contract with an option for a third year with Thorns FC. She made her professional debut as a 90th-minute substitute on 1 April 2023 against the Kansas City Current. On 26 May 2023, Reyes scored her first professional goal in a 1–1 draw against San Diego Wave FC.

On 11 October 2024, Reyes assisted Morgan Weaver from a corner kick to open a 2–0 victory over the Orlando Pride, helping hand the league leaders their first loss of the season.

== International career ==
Reyes represented Mexico at two FIFA U-17 Women's World Cup editions (2016 and 2018), the 2018 CONCACAF Women's U-17 Championship, the 2019 Sud Ladies Cup and the 2020 CONCACAF Women's U-20 Championship. She made her senior debut on 24 February 2021 in a 0–0 friendly home draw against Costa Rica.

== Career statistics ==
=== College ===
Team	Season	Regular season			SEC Tournament		NCAA Tournament		Total	
Team	Season	Division	Apps	Goals	Apps	Goals	Apps	Goals	Apps	Goals
Alabama Crimson Tide	2019	SEC	16	2	2	1	—		18	3
Alabama Crimson Tide	2020–21	SEC	13	2	1	0	—		14	2
Alabama Crimson Tide	2021	SEC	17	3	1	0	2	0	20	3
Alabama Crimson Tide	2022	SEC	19	6	3	0	5	2	27	8
Total			65	13	7	1	7	2	79	16

=== Club ===
As of match played September 21, 2024

Appearances and goals by club, season and competition
Club	Season	League			Cup (Note: Includes the NWSL Challenge Cup)		Playoffs (Note: Includes NWSL Playoffs)		International Cups		Total	
Club	Season	Division	Apps	Goals	Apps	Goals	Apps	Goals	Apps	Goals	Apps	Goals
Portland Thorns FC	2023	NWSL	20	1	5	1	1	0	—		26	2
Portland Thorns FC	2024	NWSL	20	0	—		—		3	0	23	0
Portland Thorns FC	2025	NWSL	0	0	0	0	0	0	0	0	0	0
Career total			40	1	5	1	1	0	3	0	49	2
