= Taylor Wood =

American soccer player (born 1999)

- Wood with the Chicago Red Stars in 2026

Personal information
- Full name: Taylor Mae Wood
- Birth name: Taylor Mae Malham
- Date of birth: May 20, 1999 (age 27)
- Place of birth: Broken Arrow, Oklahoma, US
- Height: 5 ft 10 in (1.78 m)
- Position: Fullback

Team information
- Current team: Chicago Stars
- Number: 14

College career
Years	Team	Apps	(Gls)
2017–2021	Arkansas Razorbacks	107	(33)

Senior career*
Years	Team	Apps	(Gls)
2022	Racing Louisville	4	(0)
2023–	Chicago Stars	63	(1)

International career
- United States U18
- * Club domestic league appearances and goals as of 05:36, November 2, 2026 (UTC)

Taylor Mae Wood (née Malham; born May 20, 1999) is an American professional soccer player who plays as a fullback for Chicago Stars FC of the National Women's Soccer League (NWSL). Born in Broken Arrow, Oklahoma, she played college soccer for the Arkansas Razorbacks.

== Early life ==
Wood was born on May 20, 1999, in Broken Arrow, Oklahoma, and attended Union High School in Tulsa. She played a part in Union's back-to-back undefeated seasons in 2015 and 2016, as the team won the OSSAA 6A state championship both years, scoring a goal in the latter championship game, and were named national champions in both seasons by TopDrawerSoccer.com. Wood was also a four-year starter on the basketball team at Union, averaging 17.2 points per game and finishing the 2016–17 season among the top scorers in her class. That season, she was also named to one of the all-state teams. Coming out of high school, Wood was rated as a three-star soccer recruit by TopDrawerSoccer.com and was the 88th-ranked player nationally by IMG Academy. She was also named the Oklahoma state Gatorade Player of the Year in 2016–17.

Wood played club soccer for TSC Hurricanes and Fortuna Tulsa, and participated in the under-17 national team camp in December 2015. In high school and club soccer, Wood played alongside Parker Goins. She went on to play with Goins at Arkansas and professionally in Louisville.

== College career ==
Wood began her career at Arkansas in 2017. She started all 24 of the Razorbacks' games, the most of any freshman on the team. She made her collegiate debut on August 18, 2017, against SMU and scored her first collegiate goal two days later against North Texas on August 20, 2017. She recorded a total of six goals and two assists on the year. Three of her six goals were game-winners, including one against Ole Miss in the Hogs' SEC Tournament opener. Following the season, she was called up to the under-18 national team for a two-match tour in Switzerland, and went with Goins to San Diego for the under-19 national team training camp the following month.

Wood started all 23 Arkansas games as a sophomore, and played the second-most minutes of any player on the team. She led the team with nine assists and scored six goals, including the game-winner against Missouri, two goals in the SEC Tournament, and one goal in the NCAA Tournament against Little Rock. Wood again started all 23 matches as a junior, finishing the year with eight goals and nine assists. She recorded a hat trick on September 8, 2019, in Arkansas' game against McNeese. She recorded three game-winning goals, including in one game in the SEC Tournament.

In the shortened 2020 season, Wood started all 13 games. She recorded two goals, including the game-winner against Kentucky, and five assists. She returned for a final season as a graduate senior in 2021, when she started all 24 matches and scored eleven goals with an additional six assists. This season brought her total number of starts to 106, the most in program history. She recorded the game-winning goal in the NCAA Tournament Sweet Sixteen match against Notre Dame.

While at Arkansas, Wood studied kinesiology. She was named first-team All-SEC in 2019 and 2021 and was a member of the SEC All-Tournament Team in her freshman and senior years.

== Club career ==
=== Racing Louisville ===
After going undrafted in the 2021 NWSL Draft, Racing Louisville FC of the National Women's Soccer League acquired the right to sign Wood on January 21, 2021. She opted to play the 2021 season with Arkansas before signing with Louisville.

Wood was named as one of seven midfielders on Racing's 2022 preseason roster as a non-roster invitee. On March 15, 2022, she signed a one-year contract with an option for an additional year. She made her professional debut on March 30, 2022, as Louisville played the Chicago Red Stars, and made five appearances with the team across all competitions. On November 15, 2022, Louisville exercised its contract option on Wood to extend it for an additional year. However, the club waived her on February 18, 2023, before the start of the 2023 season.

=== Chicago Stars ===
The Chicago Red Stars (later named Chicago Stars FC) claimed Wood's rights from the NWSL waiver wire and signed her to a one-year contract with the team in March 2023.

== International career ==
On November 30, 2015, Wood was called up to the United States women's national under-17 soccer team's training camp held in December 2015.

On April 12, 2018, Wood scored a goal for the United States women's national under-18 soccer team in a 1–1 friendly draw against Switzerland.

== Personal life ==
Wood's sister, Makenzie Malham, also plays soccer, was also named Oklahoma Gatorade Player of the Year for 2020–21, and also played for the Arkansas Razorbacks.

She married Landen Wood on December 21, 2025.
