= Alabama Crimson Tide women's soccer =

American college soccer team

Alabama Crimson Tide
- 2024 Alabama Crimson Tide women's soccer team
- University: University of Alabama
- Head coach: Wes Hart (12th season)
- Conference: SEC; Western Division
- Location: Tuscaloosa, Alabama, US
- Stadium: Alabama Soccer Stadium (capacity: 1,500)
- Nickname: Crimson Tide
- Colors: Crimson and white
Home	Away

NCAA tournament College Cup
- 2022

NCAA tournament Semifinals
- 2022

NCAA tournament Quarterfinals
- 2022

NCAA tournament Round of 16
- 2021, 2022, 2023

NCAA tournament appearances
- 1998, 2011, 2017, 2021, 2022, 2023, 2025

Conference regular season championships
- 2022

The 'Alabama Crimson Tide women's soccer team is an intercollegiate varsity team who is representing the University of Alabama. The Alabama Crimson Tide competes in Division I of the National Collegiate Athletic Association (NCAA) and in the Southeastern Conference (SEC). Home games are played at the Alabama Soccer Stadium on the University of Alabama campus. Wes Hart is the current head coach of the Crimson Tide, a position he has occupied since the 2015 season.

== History ==
The inaugural season for women's soccer at the University of Alabama was in 1986, with Janko Emedi being the program's first coach. In the program's second year of existence with Coach Emedi, a winning record of 9–4–1 was achieved. Soccer at the university was absent between 1989 and 1993, until Don Staley was hired as head coach in 1994 to re-establish a soccer program at the University of Alabama. The University of Alabama Soccer Field hosted its first soccer match on October 2, 1994, against Furman University. In 2004, the team moved to the new Alabama Soccer Complex. The Crimson Tide welcomed a new coach in 2008, when Todd Bramble was hired. Bramble resigned in 2015 and was replaced by Wes Hart.

== Current roster ==
As of November 2026

Note: Flags indicate national team as defined under FIFA eligibility rules; some limited exceptions apply. Players may hold more than one non-FIFA nationality.

No.	Pos.	Nation	Player
0	GK	USA	Madi Munguia
1	GK	CAN	Coralie Lallier
2	FW	USA	Presley Williams
3	DF	USA	Avery Brown
4	DF	USA	Maison Smith
5	FW	USA	Soph Martelli
6	FW	USA	Kiley Kukan
7	FW	USA	Larkin Thomason
8	MF	USA	Olivia Belcher
9	FW	USA	Ashley Roni
10	MF	USA	Zamorah Malinoski
11	DF	USA	Cali Brewer
13	MF	USA	Melina Rebimbas
14	MF	USA	Chelsea Rogers

No.	Pos.	Nation	Player
15	DF	USA	Kennedy Garcia
16	MF	USA	Ivy Williams
17	DF	USA	Alexa Barker
18	DF	USA	Leah Klurman
19	DF	USA	Kierson McDonald
20	FW	USA	Reece Ward
21	MF	FRA	Trinity Daudu Ihayere
22	FW	USA	Jurnee Vrobel
23	MF	USA	Fiona Mahan
24	DF	USA	Ulla Sharp
25	MF	USA	Isabel Smith
30	MF	USA	Paige Thompson
55	GK	USA	Olivia Herrera

== Coaching staff ==
Wes Hart is the current head coach of the Crimson Tide. He joined the staff on April 9, 2015.

== Home stadium ==
The Alabama Soccer Stadium was built in 2008. The stadium features a high-definition scoreboard that was transferred from Bryant–Denny Stadium. Unique among collegiate soccer stadiums, the large-sized scoreboard at the Alabama Soccer Stadium provides graphics for player introductions, game replays, and customized videos. Its seating capacity is 1,500.

== Seasons ==
Year	Coach	Overall	Conference	SEC Tournament	Postseason
1986	Janko Emedi	2–9			
1987	Janko Emedi	9–4–1			
1988	Janko Emedi	8–8			
1988–1993	no team				
1994	Don Staley	13–5–1	2–1–1	1st round	
1995	Don Staley	11–9–0	6–2	2nd round	
1996	Don Staley	9–9–2	3–4–1	1st round	
1997	Don Staley	14–6	7–1	1st round	
1998	Don Staley	13–7–1	6–2	2nd round	NCAA 1st Round
1999	Don Staley	6–14	3–6		
2000	Don Staley	6–14	1–8		
2001	Don Staley	10–7–1	2–6–1		
2002	Don Staley	12–6–2	2–5–2		
2003	Don Staley	9–8–2	2–5–2		
2004	Don Staley	10–11	5–6	1st round	
2005	Don Staley	8–8–2	2–7–2		
2006	Don Staley	5–14	1–10		
2007	Don Staley	9–10–1	2–8–1		
2008	Todd Bramble	9–9–2	4–6–1	1st round	
2009	Todd Bramble	6–11–1	2–8–1		
2010	Todd Bramble	8–8–2	3–6–2		
2011	Todd Bramble	10–9–3	4–5–2	2nd round	NCAA 1st round
2012	Todd Bramble	8–9–2	2–8–2		
2013	Todd Bramble	6–12–0	4–7–0		
2014	Todd Bramble	10–7–3	5–4–2	1st round	
2015	Wes Hart	5–12–2	2–9–0		
2016	Wes Hart	10–8–3	4–5–2	1st round	
2017	Wes Hart	12–8–1	4–5–1	1st round	NCAA 1st round
2018	Wes Hart	8–8–3	2–6–2		
2019	Wes Hart	10–7–3	4–4–2	2nd round	
2020	Wes Hart	7–8–2	2–5–2	1st round	
2021	Wes Hart	11–10–1	5–4–1	Quarterfinals	NCAA 2nd round
2022	Wes Hart	23–1–1	10–0–0	Finals	NCAA Semifinals
2023	Wes Hart	12–5–5	5–4–1	Quarterfinals	NCAA 2nd round

== Notable alumni ==
=== Current professional players ===
- (Mexico) Tanna Sánchez (2020–2023) - Currently with Monterrey
- (Spain) Celia Jiménez (2015–2017) - Currently with Orlando Pride
- (United States) McKinley Crone (2020–2022) - Currently with Orlando Pride
- (United States) Nealy Martin (2016–2019) - Currently with Gotham FC
- (Mexico) Reyna Reyes (2019–2022) - Currently with Portland Thorns
- (United States) Felicia Knox (2020–2022) - Currently with Fort Lauderdale United FC
- (United States) Riley Parker (2019–2022) - Currently with Carolina Ascent FC
- (United States) Ashlynn Serepca (2021–2022) - Currently with Carolina Ascent FC
- (United States) Riley Tanner (2021–2022) - Currently with Spokane Zephyr FC
- (United States) Sasha Pickard (2019–2023) - Currently with Brooklyn FC (USL)
- (United States) Marianna Annest Seidl (2022–2023) - Currently with Brisbane Roar FC (Australian A League)
- (United States) Gianna Paul (2022-2025) - Currently with Kansas City Current
