= Vanderbilt Commodores women's soccer =

American college soccer team

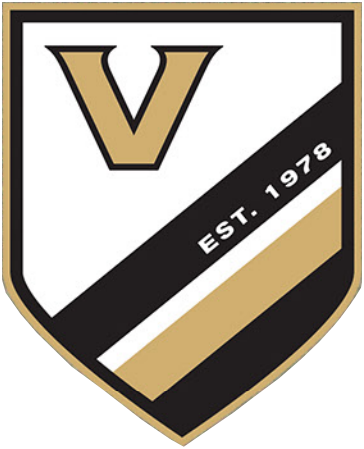
- Founded: 1987; 39 years ago
- University: Vanderbilt University
- Head coach: Darren Ambrose (12th season)
- Stadium: Vanderbilt Soccer/Lacrosse Complex (capacity: 2,400)
- Nickname: Commodores
- Colors: Black and gold
Home	Away

NCAA tournament Quarterfinals
- 2025

NCAA tournament Round of 16
- 2024, 2025

NCAA tournament Round of 32
- 1994, 1995, 1996, 1998, 2017, 2018, 2022, 2024, 2025

NCAA tournament appearances
- 1994, 1995, 1996, 1997, 1998, 2005, 2006, 2017, 2018, 2019, 2020, 2022, 2024, 2025

Conference tournament championships
- 1993, 1994, 2020, 2025

The Vanderbilt Commodores women's soccer is the team that represents Vanderbilt University in NCAA Division I college soccer. The team is coached by Darren Ambrose, and play their home games at the Vanderbilt Soccer/Lacrosse Complex, built in 2002.

== History ==
The Vanderbilt women's varsity soccer program began in 1987.

The Commodores have been to the NCAA tournament in 1994, 1995, 1996, 1997, 1998, 2005, 2006, 2017, 2018, 2019, 2020, 2022, 2024, 2025, winning it in four occasions.

Since Darren Ambrose was hired in 2015 as head women's soccer coach, Vanderbilt has made seven NCAA tournament appearances.

In 2025, Vanderbilt defeated LSU 1–0 in the Sweet 16 of the NCAA tournament, clinching their first-ever Elite 8 appearance. Melania Fullerton scored the second half game winning goal.

== Current squad ==
As of November 2026

Note: Flags indicate national team as defined under FIFA eligibility rules; some limited exceptions apply. Players may hold more than one non-FIFA nationality.

No.	Pos.	Nation	Player
0	GK	CAN	Kellyane Dumas
00	GK	USA	Kennadie Marchand
1	GK	USA	Alexa Gianoplus
2	MF	USA	Ally Bollig-Agu
3	DF	USA	Grace Freeman
4	FW	USA	Megan Hinnenkamp
5	DF	USA	Alexis Smith
6	DF	USA	Adysen Armenta
7	FW	USA	Mia Hebert
8	MF	USA	Reagan Pentz
9	FW	USA	Vicky Pugh
10	MF	USA	Melania Fullerton
11	MF	USA	Hailey Perkins

No.	Pos.	Nation	Player
12	DF	USA	Allison Kleiner
13	FW	USA	Ella Eggleston
14	MF	USA	Lydia Ungashick
15	FW	USA	Sydney Watts
17	MF	USA	Lena Tusche
18	DF	USA	Margo Matula
20	DF	USA	Nina Laba
21	DF	USA	Mary Beth McLaughlin
23	MF	USA	Ana Ramirez
24	MF	USA	Courtney Jones
25	MF	USA	Lawson Hopkins
27	FW	USA	Olivia Stafford
32	GK	USA	Layla Armas

== NCAA tournament ==
Vanderbilt participations in the NCAA tournament, detailed below:

=== Results ===
Year	Last stage	Rival	Score
1994	2nd. round	Duke	1–2
1995	2nd. round	North Carolina	0–4
1996	2nd. round	Portland	1–3 (a.e.t.)
1997	1st. round	Florida	2–3
1998	2nd. round	Clemson	0–2
2005	2nd. round	Sanford	1–1 (4–5 p)
2006	1st. round	Clemson	1–1 (3–4 p)
2017	2nd. round	Santa Clara	1–3
2018	2nd. round	Baylor	1–3
2019	1st. round	Clemson	0–0 (4–5 p)
2020	1st. round	Penn State	0–2
2022	2nd. round	Northwestern	1–2
2024	3rd. round	Penn State	1–3

=== Statistics ===
As of December 2025

Class	Numbers
Appearances	13
Matches	22
Overall Record	8–10–4
Home record	3–0–0
Away record	5–6–4
Neutral record	0–4–0
Goals for	36
Goals against	39

== Titles ==
=== Conference ===
- SEC tournament (4): 1993, 1994, 2020, 2025
