= Orange Beach Sportsplex =

Sports complex in Orange Beach, Alabama

Coordinates: 30.2829°N 87.6137°W

- Interactive map of Orange Beach Sportsplex
- Address: 4385 William Silvers Pkwy; Orange Beach, AL; United States
- Owner: City of Orange Beach
- Capacity: 1,500
- Type: Stadium
- Current use: Soccer

Construction
- Opened: 2001; 25 years ago

The Orange Beach Sportsplex is a sports complex in Orange Beach, Alabama that was built in 2001.

The focus of the complex is the 1,500-seat stadium. The stadium has hosted the SEC women's soccer tournament and has completed negotiations to host the tournament through 2020. The facility also hosts the NCAA Division II men's and women's soccer tournaments. In past years, the stadium hosted the now defunct Alabama Lightning of the North American Football League.

Aside from the stadium, the sportsplex is home to baseball, softball, and youth sports leagues.

The city of Orange Beach has announced plans to upgrade lighting on the championship field as part of the tournament contract.
