= Jordan Brown (goalkeeper) =

American soccer player (born 2004)

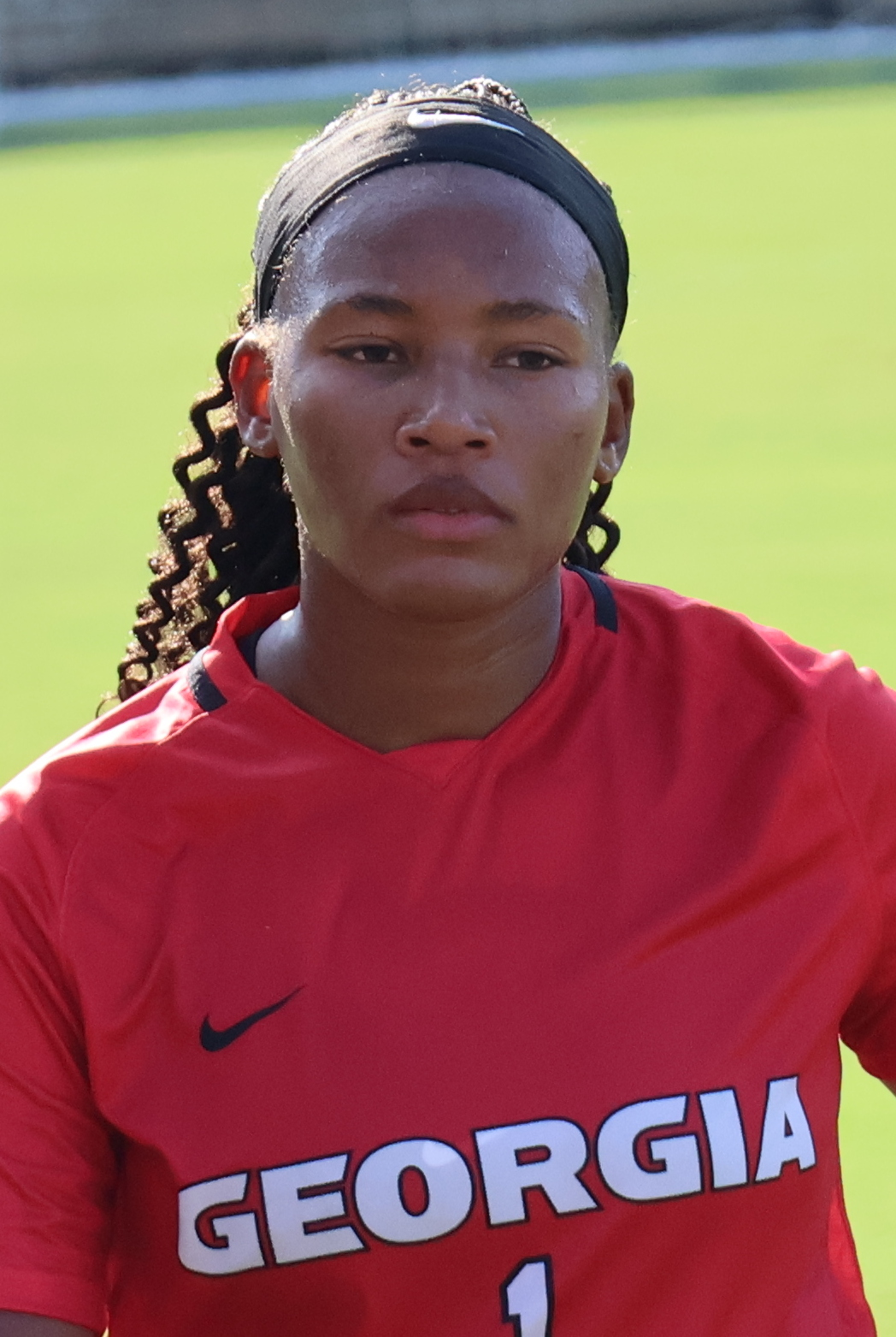
- Brown with Georgia in 2024

Personal information
- Date of birth: February 23, 2004 (age 22)
- Place of birth: Las Vegas, Nevada, U.S.
- Height: 5 ft 11 in (1.80 m)
- Position: Goalkeeper

Team information
- Current team: Georgia Bulldogs
- Number: 1

College career
Years	Team	Apps	(Gls)
2022–	Georgia Bulldogs	51	(0)

Jordan Brown (born February 23, 2004) is an American college soccer player who plays as a goalkeeper for the Georgia Bulldogs.

== Early life ==
Brown was born in Inglewood California and raised in Las Vegas Nevada the daughter of Leslie and Shannon Brown. She began playing soccer at a young age and moved to goalkeeper around the age of nine, saving a penalty kick on her debut in goal for her club team. She attended Faith Lutheran High School, where she started in goal for four seasons. She led Faith Lutheran to the school's first 4A state championship in 2019, keeping 18 clean sheets against 3 goals allowed and being named the Nevada Gatorade Player of the Year. She finished her high school career with 37 shutouts, 1 goal from kick-off, and 2 assists. She played ECNL club soccer for Heat FC.

== College career ==
Brown initially redshirted her freshman season with the Georgia Bulldogs in 2022 before head coach Keidane McAlpine chose to begin playing her during the season. She ended up starting the last 8 games of the year and keeping 5 clean sheets. In the SEC tournament, she made 6 saves in a 1–1 draw against South Carolina in the semifinals but lost in a penalty shootout. Previous starter Liz Beardsley transferred to Maryland after the season. In her sophomore season in 2023, Brown played in 23 games (22 starts), making 79 saves and keeping 6 shutouts. She posted 22 saves in three games during the SEC tournament, helping shut out Arkansas 1–0 in the final as Georgia won its first SEC title. She helped reach the third round of the NCAA tournament, losing to Clemson on penalties. In her junior season in 2024, she led the conference in saves and kept 9 clean sheets in 21 games, earning second-team All-SEC honors. The following May, she suffered a knee injury which ruled her out for the 2025 season.

== International career ==
Brown was invited to virtual national team training at the under-18 level in 2021. She was called up by Emma Hayes into Futures Camp, practicing alongside the senior national team, in January 2025, her first national team camp call-up at any level.

== Honors and awards ==
Georgia Bulldogs

- SEC women's soccer tournament: 2023

Individual

- Second-team All-SEC: 2024
- SEC tournament all-tournament team: 2022, 2023
