= Gracie Falla =

American soccer player (born 2004)

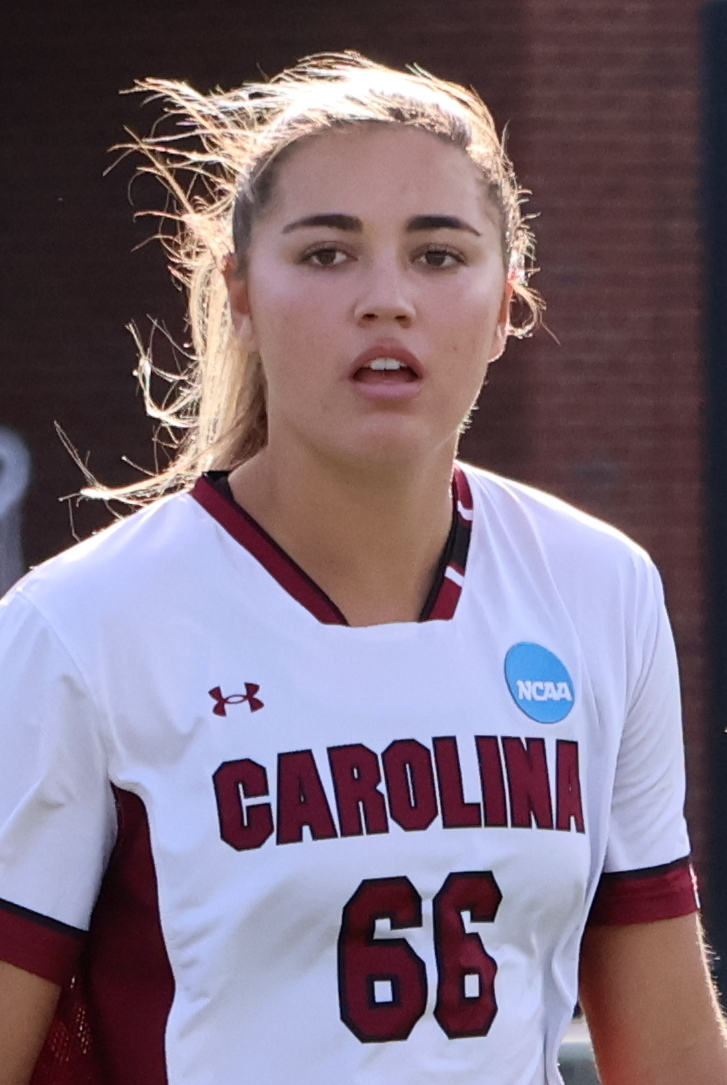
- Falla with South Carolina in 2024

Personal information
- Full name: Graciella Andrea Falla
- Date of birth: May 21, 2004 (age 22)
- Height: 5 ft 8 in (1.73 m)
- Position: Defender

Team information
- Current team: Lexington SC
- Number: 66

Youth career
- Alabama FC

College career
Years	Team	Apps	(Gls)
2022–2025	South Carolina Gamecocks	86	(3)

Senior career*
Years	Team	Apps	(Gls)
2026–	Lexington SC	1	(0)
- * Club domestic league appearances and goals as of 05:33, August 16, 2026 (UTC)

Graciella Andrea Falla (born May 21, 2004) is an American professional soccer player who plays as a defender for USL Super League club Lexington SC. She played college soccer for the South Carolina Gamecocks, earning earning second-team All-American honors in 2025.

== Early life ==
Falla grew up in Hattiesburg, Mississippi. Predominantly a forward in her youth, she played club soccer for Alabama FC, earning one Elite Clubs National League all-conference team honor. Falla attended Sacred Heart Catholic School and began playing for Sacred Heart's soccer team as a middle schooler. She went on to contribute to four Mississippi state championships, earning one all-region honor along the way. In both 2020 and 2021, she participated in the state's all-star game. A dual-sport athlete, Falla also participated in high school basketball. She was named the district's 2021 MVP and also earned the opportunity to play in the state's basketball all-star game.

== College career ==
As a freshman with the South Carolina Gamecocks, Falla was converted from a forward to a defender. Learning from fellow NWSL defender Jyllissa Harris, Falla went on to start in 23 of the Gamecocks' 24 matches and help the team record 14 shutouts. She won the 2022 SEC tournament with South Carolina before playing the entirety of all three of the Gamecocks' NCAA tournament games that year. She was named to the SEC All-Freshman team at the end of the season.

In her sophomore season in 2023, Falla was named the Southeastern Conference (SEC) Defender of the Year, becoming the first Gamecock to do so since Grace Fisk in 2019. In October 2023, she scored her first collegiate goals, first against Texas A&M, and then three days later against Georgia (both goals were game-winners). The following year, Falla posted another strong campaign in which she all-southeast region honors as well.

Falla finished her collegiate career with a senior year in which she was named SEC Defender of the Year for a second time. She also earned second-team All-American honors, her first national accolade. In each of her last three years with the Gamecocks, she also earned All-SEC first team honors after leading the team in minutes. Falla departed from the program having made 86 appearances (84 starts) for South Carolina.

== Club career ==
On January 28, 2026, USL Super League club Lexington SC announced that they had signed Falla to her first professional contract, reuniting her with former Gamecocks teammate Catherine Barry. Falla finished up her final year of college back in South Carolina before officially joining Lexington six months later, ahead of the 2026 Super League fall season. She made her professional debut on August 15, starting and playing the entirety of Lexington's season-opening win over Brooklyn FC. Falla earned a spot on the August 2026 USL Super League Team of the Month after posting positive defensive statistics through her first few professional games.

== International career ==
Falla received an invite to the United States under-18 national team as a high schooler. In January 2024, she earned her first-ever under-20 call-up, joining the squad for a training camp in Carson, California. Two years later, Falla was invited to an under-23 Development Camp, which trained concurrently with the senior team and was also based in Carson, California.

== Personal life ==
Falla's brother, Grant, played college soccer for the Mississippi State Bulldogs, while her sister, Gabby, played at East Central Community College. Her late uncle was a college football player for the LSU Tigers in the 1980s. Falla honors her uncle by wearing her uncle's LSU jersey number, 66, when she plays.

== Honors and awards ==
South Carolina Gamecocks

- SEC women's soccer tournament: 2022

Individual

- Second-team All-American: 2025
- First-team All-SEC: 2023, 2024, 2025
- SEC all-freshman team: 2022
- SEC Defender of the Year: 2023, 2025
