= Heather Hinz =

American soccer player (born 2001)

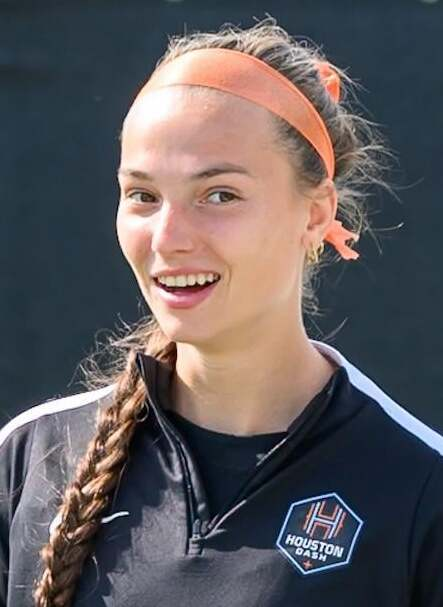
- Hinz with the Houston Dash in 2025

Personal information
- Full name: Heather Elizabeth Hinz
- Date of birth: June 27, 2001 (age 25)
- Place of birth: Laytonsville, Maryland, U.S.
- Height: 5 ft 7 in (1.70 m)
- Position: Goalkeeper

Team information
- Current team: Fort Lauderdale United
- Number: 1

College career
| Years | Team | Apps | (Gls) |
| 2019–2023 | South Carolina Gamecocks | 78 | (0) |

Senior career*
| Years | Team | Apps | (Gls) |
| 2024–2025 | Houston Dash | 1 | (0) |
| 2024 | → Fort Lauderdale United (loan) | 2 | (0) |
| 2025–2026 | Sydney FC | 13 | (0) |
| 2026– | Fort Lauderdale United | 0 | (0) |
- * Club domestic league appearances and goals as of 22:57, July 13, 2026 (UTC)

Heather Elizabeth Hinz (/hɪnz/; born June 27, 2001) is an American professional soccer player who plays as a goalkeeper for USL Super League club Fort Lauderdale United FC. She played college soccer for the South Carolina Gamecocks and was named SEC Goalkeeper of the Year in 2023. She was drafted by the Houston Dash in the third round of the 2024 NWSL Draft. She has also previously played for A-League Women club Sydney FC.

== Early life ==
Hinz was born in Laytonsville, Maryland. She started out as a striker before being asked to play in goal after an injury to the goalkeeper for her Olympic Development Program team. She played high school soccer at Our Lady of Good Counsel and ECNL club soccer for Bethesda Union.

== College career ==
Following one season as a backup, Hinz became the starting goalkeeper for the South Carolina Gamecocks during the pandemic-abbreviated 2020 season. In the 2021 postseason, she had to make only three saves in an upset of North Carolina in the first round of the NCAA tournament and went on to record a career-high eleven saves in their quarterfinal loss to BYU. She led the country with 13 clean sheets in the 2022 season, part of the strong defense on a Gamecock team that ranked as high as third nationally. In that year's SEC championship, she saved three penalty kicks in a semifinal shootout against Georgia and made a last-minute save to keep her shutout against Alabama in the title game, being named the tournament's most valuable player. She recorded ten shutouts in 2023, leading the conference in save percentage and goals against average, and was recognized as the SEC Goalkeeper of the Year and first-team All-SEC.

== Club career ==
=== Houston Dash ===
Hinz was drafted 38th overall by the Houston Dash in the third round of 2024 NWSL Draft. She signed a one-year contract with the option for another year, becoming a backup for reigning NWSL Goalkeeper of the Year Jane Campbell. On July 28, she made her professional debut in the NWSL x Liga MX Femenil Summer Cup, putting together multiple saves in a 2–1 win against Tigres UANL. After an injury to Campbell, Hinz made her regular-season debut and started in the season finale on November 2, making five saves in a 3–2 loss to Bay FC.

Seven days later, Hinz joined USL Super League club Fort Lauderdale United FC on a two-month loan. She made her USL debut the following day in a 1–1 draw with the Tampa Bay Sun. After making two appearances, she was recalled to Houston on December 10. On May 5, 2025, the Dash announced that she had mutually agreed to terminate her contract.

=== Sydney FC ===
On June 30, 2025, Hinz signed a one-year contract with A-League Women club Sydney FC. On November 8, she made her debut for the club and started in a 0–0 draw with Adelaide United on matchday two. She has made a great start to her career in Sydney, establishing herself as one of the best goalkeepers in the league, conceding an average of just 0.9 goals per game and having a strong 87% save rate. At the end of the season, Hinz won the A-League Women's Players' Player of the Year Award and the Members' Player of the Year Award. In June 2026, she departed the club at the conclusion of her contract to take up an opportunity in the United States.

=== Fort Lauderdale United ===
In July 2026, Hinz returned to former club Fort Lauderdale United FC in the USL Super League.

== Personal life ==
Hinz is the daughter of Laura and Lance Hinz. She has three older sisters; Megan was also a professional goalkeeper before going into college coaching. Hinz knows American Sign Language (ASL). She is good friends with former Sydney FC and former Houston Dash teammate Maddy Ayson.

== Honors and awards ==
South Carolina Gamecocks

- SEC women's soccer tournament: 2022

Individual

- SEC Goalkeeper of the Year: 2023
- First-team All-SEC: 2023
- SEC tournament MVP: 2022
