= Dasia Torbert =

American soccer player (born 2002)

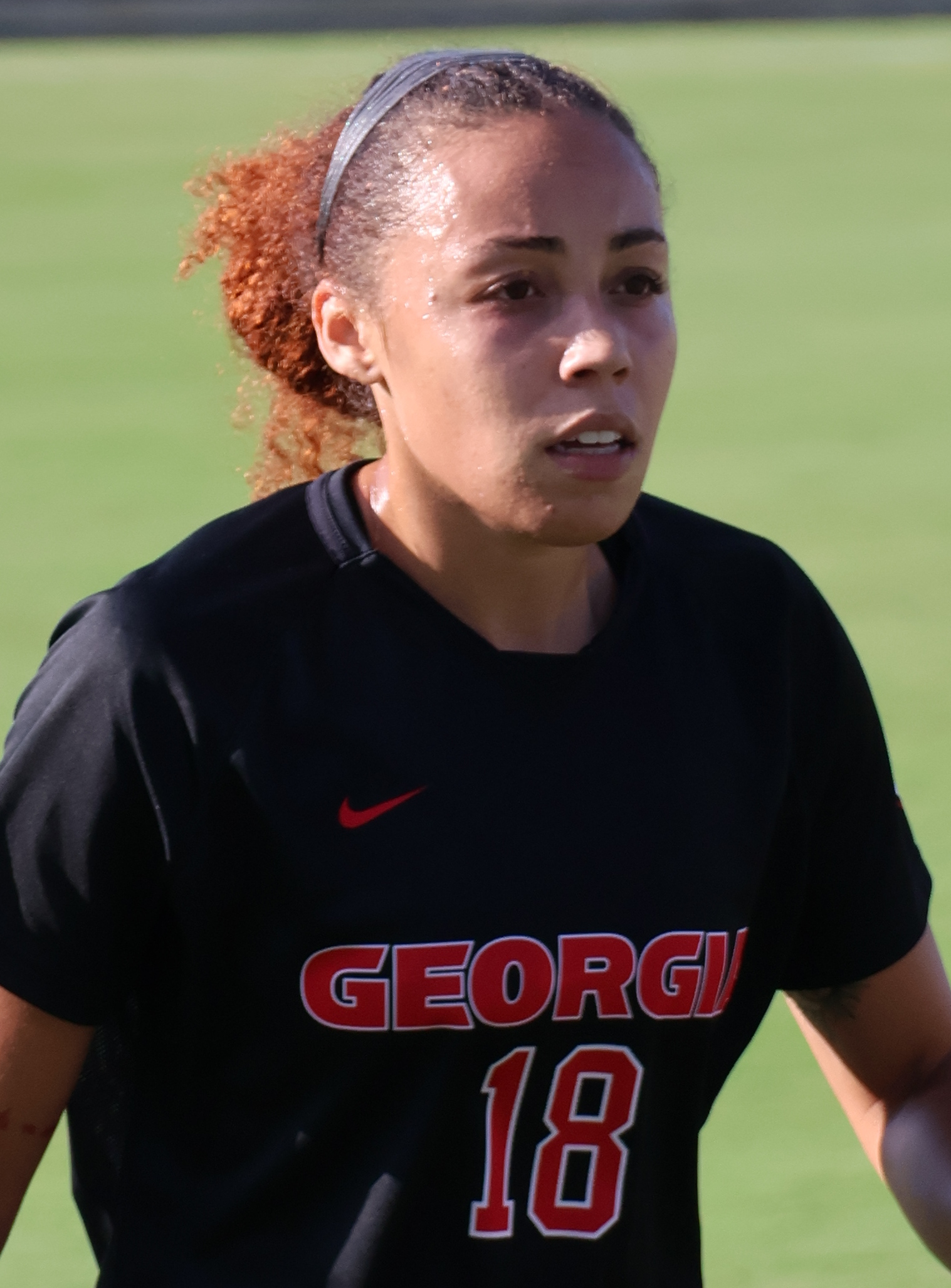
- Torbert with Georgia in 2024

Personal information
- Full name: Dasia Cameron Torbert
- Date of birth: January 17, 2002 (age 24)
- Place of birth: Lawrenceville, Georgia, U.S.
- Height: 5 ft 9 in (1.75 m)
- Position: Midfielder

Team information
- Current team: Tampa Bay Sun
- Number: 18

Youth career
- NASA Tophat

College career
Years	Team	Apps	(Gls)
2020–2021	UCLA Bruins	21	(1)
2022–2024	Georgia Bulldogs	29	(6)

Senior career*
Years	Team	Apps	(Gls)
2025–2026	DC Power FC	23	(4)
2026–	Tampa Bay Sun	2	(0)

International career^{‡}
2020	United States U18	3	(0)
- * Club domestic league appearances and goals as of 00:44, November 7, 2026 (UTC) ‡ National team caps and goals as of 05:56, December 22, 2025 (UTC)

Dasia Cameron Torbert (born January 17, 2002) is an American professional soccer player who plays as a midfielder for USL Super League club Tampa Bay Sun FC. She played college soccer for the UCLA Bruins and the Georgia Bulldogs before starting her professional career with DC Power FC.

== Early life ==
Born in Lawrenceville, Georgia, Torbert grew up in the nearby town of Buford. She played youth soccer for NASA Tophat, where she scored 13 goals in 2020 to help Tophat earn recognition as the highest-ranked club in the United States. In her one season of soccer for Mountain View High School, she recorded 22 goals and 11 assists.

== College career ==
=== UCLA Bruins ===
Torbert played her first stint of college soccer for the UCLA Bruins. She sustained a knee injury in the preseason of her freshman year, limiting her participation to only the final two matches of the spring season. She would go on to total 21 appearances (9 starts) across two campaigns for UCLA, contributing to a Pac-12 title in both seasons. Her lone goal as a Bruin was the game-tying tally against Arizona State on October 3, 2021.

=== Georgia Bulldogs ===
Both of Torbert's parents are former collegiate athletes for the Georgia Bulldogs. Ahead of the 2022 season, Torbert transferred to the University of Georgia, following in their footsteps. She got off to a hot start for the Bulldogs, registering goal contributions in five consecutive games early in the season. After the fifth match, in which she recorded a goal and an assist against Texas A&M, she was named the SEC Co-Offensive Player of the Week. However, the Texas A&M game was bittersweet, as Torbert sustained a knee injury during the match that sidelined her for nearly two years. She was forced to watch on from the stands as Georgia won its first-ever SEC tournament title the following season.

Torbert recovered in time to play a full season for the Bulldogs in 2024. On September 15, 2024, she scored her first career brace to help Georgia beat Washington State, 4–1. On November 3, she netted the game-winning goal against Texas A&M in the first round of the SEC tournament; however, the Bulldogs were eliminated by Arkansas in the following round.

== Club career ==
Torbert spent time in the 2025 NWSL preseason as a trialist with the Chicago Stars, but she did not make the team's final roster.

On September 5, 2025, USL Super League club DC Power FC announced that they had signed Torbert to her first professional contract. Torbert made her pro debut on September 25, starting and playing 72 minutes in a scoreless stalemate with Lexington SC. The following match, she assisted Loza Abera in a 2–2 draw with Brooklyn FC that helped extend DC Power's early undefeated run to four consecutive games. On November 12, she scored her first two professional goals in a 3–1 victory over Fort Lauderdale United FC. Torbert went on to record 4 goals in 23 appearances for DC as the team failed to qualify for the playoffs for the second year in a row. In June 2026, Power FC opted to decline Torbert's contract option, releasing her after one season.

Torbert signed for fellow Super League club Tampa Bay Sun FC on July 3, 2026.

== International career ==
Torbert has represented the United States internationally at four different youth national team levels: U14, U16, U18, and U20. In 2020, she started two of the under-18 team's three matches at the Tricontinental Cup, which was won by the Netherlands.

== Honors ==
UCLA Bruins

- Pac-12 Conference: 2020, 2021

Georgia Bulldogs

- SEC women's soccer tournament: 2023
