= 2023 SEC women's soccer tournament =

Soccer tournament

- Classification: Division I
- Teams: 10
- Matches: 9
- Attendance: 6,415
- Site: Ashton Brosnaham Soccer Complex; Pensacola, Florida
- Champions: Georgia (1st title)
- Winning coach: Keidane McAlpine (1st title)
- MVP: Croix Bethune (Georgia)
- Broadcast: SEC Network

2023 SEC women's soccer standings
	Conf.						Overall
Team	W		L		T	PCT	W		L		T	PCT
No. 17 Arkansas ‍†‍‍^{y}	8	–	1	–	1	.850	15	–	5	–	2	.727
No. 21 South Carolina ‍‍‍^{y}	5	–	0	–	5	.750	12	–	3	–	6	.714
No. 14 Mississippi State ‍‍‍^{y}	5	–	3	–	2	.600	12	–	6	–	5	.630
No. 22 Alabama ‍‍‍^{y}	5	–	4	–	1	.550	12	–	5	–	5	.659
No. 13 Georgia ‍‍‡‍^{y}	4	–	3	–	3	.550	13	–	4	–	6	.696
Texas A&M ‍‍‍^{y}	4	–	3	–	3	.550	10	–	8	–	4	.545
Kentucky ‍‍‍	3	–	3	–	4	.500	9	–	4	–	6	.632
Auburn ‍‍‍	3	–	4	–	3	.450	8	–	7	–	5	.525
Tennessee ‍‍‍^{y}	3	–	4	–	3	.450	9	–	7	–	4	.550
LSU ‍‍‍^{y}	3	–	5	–	2	.400	8	–	8	–	4	.500
Vanderbilt ‍‍‍	3	–	5	–	2	.400	8	–	5	–	5	.583
Ole Miss ‍‍‍	3	–	5	–	2	.400	7	–	7	–	3	.500
Florida ‍‍‍	2	–	4	–	4	.400	6	–	5	–	6	.529
Missouri ‍‍‍	1	–	8	–	1	.150	5	–	9	–	3	.382
† – Conference champion ‡ – 2023 SEC Tournament champion y – Invited to the NCAA Tournament; As of November 7, 2023; Rankings from United Soccer Coaches Poll; Source: SEC

The 2023 SEC women's soccer tournament was the postseason women's soccer tournament for the Southeastern Conference held from October 29 to November 5, 2023. The tournament was held at the Ashton Brosnaham Soccer Complex in Pensacola, Florida. The ten-team single elimination tournament consisted of four rounds based on seeding from regular season conference play. The South Carolina Gamecocks are the defending champions. The Gamecocks were unable to defend their crown, losing to Texas A&M in the Quarterfinals. Georgia won the tournament with a 1–0 victory over Arkansas in the final. The conference championship is the first for the Georgia women's soccer program, and first for second-year head coach Keidane McAlpine. As tournament champions, Georgia earned the Southeastern Conference's automatic berth into the 2023 NCAA Division I Women's Soccer Tournament.

== Qualification ==
The top 10 teams in the conference qualified for the 2023 Tournament. The top six teams were awarded byes into the Quarterfinals. Teams were seeded based on regular season records, with the Eastern and Western Division champions being awarded the top two seeds. A tiebreaker was required to determine the eighth and ninth seeds as Auburn and Tennessee finished with identical 3–4–3 regular season records. The two teams did not meet in the regular season so a second tiebreaker of points earned against common opponents was used. Auburn won this tiebreaker eleven points to eight and was therefore awarded the eighth seed. A three-way tiebreaker was required to determine the tenth, and last seed, of the tournament as LSU, Ole Miss, and Vanderbilt all finished with identical 3–5–2 regular season records. Since all teams did not play each other during the regular season the second tiebreaker of points earned against common opponents was used. LSU and Vanderbilt earned four points, while Ole Miss only earned one point. Therefore, Ole Miss was eliminated. LSU and Vanderbilt did not meet during the regular season, and points earned against common opponents was again used to break the tie. LSU earned ten points while Vanderbilt earned eight points. Therefore, LSU was the tenth and final seed for the tournament.

Seed	School	Conference Record	Conference Points
1	Arkansas	8–1–1	25
2	Georgia*	4–3–3	15*
3	South Carolina	5–0–5	20
4	Mississippi State	5–3–2	17
5	Alabama	5–4–1	16
6	Texas A&M	4–3–3	15
7	Kentucky	3–3–4	13
8	Auburn	3–4–3	12
9	Tennessee	3–4–3	12
10	LSU	3–5–2	11

(*: division winners are automatically given the top two seeds).

== Bracket ==
First Round; Sunday, Oct. 29
7	Kentucky (pen.)	0 (4)
10	LSU	0 (2)
8	Auburn	2
9	Tennessee	1

Quarterfinals; Tuesday, Oct. 31
2	Georgia	2
7	Kentucky	1
3	South Carolina	0
6	Texas A&M	1
1	Arkansas	4
8	Auburn	0
4	Mississippi State (pen.)	1 (2)
5	Alabama	1 (0)

Semifinals; Thursday, Nov. 2
2	Georgia (a.e.t.)	3
6	Texas A&M	2
1	Arkansas	2
4	Mississippi State	0

Final; Sunday, Nov. 5
2	Georgia	1
1	Arkansas	0

== Matches ==
=== First round ===
October 31 Match 1	#7 Kentucky	0–0 (a.e.t.) (4–2 p)	#10 LSU	Pensacola, FL
1:00 p.m. CT	Maggy Henschler (yellow card) 21' (yellow-red card) 55'; Grace Hoytink (yellow card) 66'; Katelyn Fishnick (yellow card) 70'; Team (yellow card) 87'	Report	(yellow card) 54' Rammie Noel; (yellow card) 56' Taylor Dobles; (yellow card) 88' Team; (yellow card) 88' Sage Glover	Stadium: Ashton Brosnaham Soccer Complex; Referee: Elvis Mahmutovic; Assistant referees: Sam Bilbo; Kendall McCardell; Fourth official: Aaron Hernandez
	Penalties
	Úlfa Úlfarsdóttir (penalty scored); Grace Phillpotts (penalty scored); Sam Halligan (penalty missed); Maddie Eastman (penalty scored); Jordyn Rhodes (penalty scored)		(penalty scored) Ida Hermannsdottir; (penalty missed) Mollie Baker; (penalty missed) Jordan Johnson; (penalty scored) Sage Glover

October 29 Match 2	#8 Auburn	2–1	#9 Tennessee	Pensacola, FL
3:30 p.m. CT	Becky Contreras 38'; Haley Duca 41'	Report	17' Kameron Simmonds; (yellow card) 26' Sheridan Michel; (yellow card) 90' Lindsey Brick	Stadium: Ashton Brosnaham Soccer Complex; Attendance: 1,244; Referee: Lorenzo Hernandez; Assistant referees: Katarzyna Wasiak; Craig Lowry; Fourth official: Jonathan Weiner

=== Quarterfinals ===
October 31 Match 3	#2 Georgia	2–1	#7 Kentucky	Pensacola, FL
12:00 p.m. CT	Summer Denigan (red card) 2'; Croix Bethune 63'; Mallie McKenzie 81'	Report	2' (pen.) Úlfa Úlfarsdóttir; (yellow card) 16' Tanner Strickland	Stadium: Ashton Brosnaham Soccer Complex; Referee: Jonathan Weiner; Assistant referees: Katarzyna Wasiak; Craig Lowry; Fourth official: Michael Lavergne

October 31 Match 4	#3 South Carolina	0–1	#6 Texas A&M	Pensacola, FL
2:30 p.m. CT	Catherine Barry (yellow card) 36'	Report	(yellow card) 33' Carissa Boeckmann; 79' Sydney Becerra	Stadium: Ashton Brosnaham Soccer Complex; Attendance: 1,127; Referee: Lorenzo Hernandez; Assistant referees: Kendall McCardell; Sam Bilbo; Fourth official: Aaron Hernandez

October 31 Match 5	#1 Arkansas	4–0	#8 Auburn	Pensacola, FL
5:00 p.m. CT	Morgan White 28', (yellow card) 58'; Bea Franklin 34'; Anna Podojil 63'; Kate Carter 84'	Report		Stadium: Ashton Brosnaham Soccer Complex; Referee: Corey Rockwell; Assistant referees: Katarzyna Wasiak; Craig Lowry; Fourth official: Christopher Heintzman

October 31 Match 6	#4 Mississippi State	1–1 (a.e.t.) (2–0 p)	#5 Alabama	Pensacola, FL
7:30 p.m. CT	Aitana Martinez-Montoya 55' (pen.); Alexis Gutierrez (yellow card) 58'	Report	(yellow card) 15' Gessica Skorka; 24' Brooke Steere; (yellow card) 70' Sasha Pickard	Stadium: Ashton Brosnaham Soccer Complex; Attendance: 832; Referee: Michael Lavergne; Assistant referees: Sam Bilbo; Kendall McCardell; Fourth official: Lorenzo Hernandez
	Penalties
	Aitana Martinez-Montoya (penalty scored); Rylie Combs (penalty missed); Kennedy White (penalty scored)		(penalty missed) Felicia Knox; (penalty missed) Marianna Annest; (penalty missed) Sydney Japic; (penalty missed) Gianna Paul

=== Semifinals ===
November 2 Match 7	#1 Arkansas	2–0	#4 Mississippi State	Pensacola, FL
5:00 p.m. CT	Ava Tankersley 13'; Bea Franklin (yellow card) 30'; Morgan White 85'	Report		Stadium: Ashton Brosnaham Soccer Complex; Referee: Aaron Hernandez; Assistant referees: Jennifer Politz; Katarzyna Wasiak; Fourth official: Mario Maric

November 2 Match 8	#2 Georgia	3–2 (a.e.t.)	#6 Texas A&M	Pensacola, FL
7:30 p.m. CT	Nicole Vernis 56' (pen.); Mallie McKenzie (yellow card) 77'; Hannah White 95'; Croix Bethune 110'	Report	41' Taylor Jernigan; (yellow card) 73' Carissa Boeckmann; 104' Jazmine Wilkinson; (yellow card) 105' MaKhiya McDonald	Stadium: Ashton Brosnaham Soccer Complex; Attendance: 1,485; Referee: Corey Rockwell; Assistant referees: Jessica Carnevale; Craig Lowery; Fourth official: Jonathan Weiner

=== Final ===
November 5 Match 9	#1 Arkansas	0–1	#2 Georgia	Pensacola, FL
1:00 p.m. CT	Team (yellow card) 19'	Report	7' Arkansas Own Goal	Stadium: Ashton Brosnaham Soccer Complex; Attendance: 1,727; Referee: Jonathan Weiner; Assistant referees: Jessica Carnevale; Aaron Fong; Fourth official: Mario Maric

== Statistics ==
=== Goalscorers ===
There were 21 goals scored in 9 matches, for an average of 2.33 goals per match (as of November 5, 2023).

2 goals

- Morgan White – Arkansas
- Croix Bethune – Georgia

1 goal

- Brooke Steere – Alabama
- Kate Carter – Arkansas
- Bea Franklin – Arkansas
- Anna Podojil – Arkansas
- Ava Tankersley – Arkansas
- Becky Contreras – Auburn
- Haley Duca – Auburn
- Mallie McKenzie – Georgia
- Nicole Vernis – Georgia
- Hannah White – Georgia
- Úlfa Úlfarsdóttir – Kentucky
- Aitana Martinez-Montoya – Mississippi State
- Kameron Simmonds – Tennessee
- Sydney Becerra – Texas A&M
- Taylor Jernigan – Texas A&M
- Jazmine Wilkinson – Texas A&M

1 own goal

- Arkansas (vs. Georgia)

== All-Tournament team ==
Player	Team
Bea Franklin	Arkansas
Makenzie Malham	Arkansas
Ava Tankersley	Arkansas
Jordan Brown	Georgia
**Croix Bethune**	Georgia
Mallie McKenzie	Georgia
Hannah White	Georgia
Maddy Anderson	Mississippi State
Rylie Combs	Mississippi State
Sydney Becerra	Texas A&M
Carolyn Calzada	Texas A&M

MVP in bold
