= Keegan Smith (American soccer player) =

American soccer player (born 2006)

Personal information
- Date of birth: 2006 (age 19–20)
- Height: 5 ft 11 in (1.80 m)
- Position: Goalkeeper

Team information
- Current team: Arkansas Razorbacks
- Number: 2

College career
Years	Team	Apps	(Gls)
2024–	Arkansas Razorbacks	28	(0)

Keegan Smith (born 2006) is an American college soccer player who plays as a goalkeeper for the Arkansas Razorbacks.

== Early life ==
Smith grew up in Bath, New York, the daughter of Chris and Kristi Smith, and has a sister, Mackenzie, who played college soccer at Clemson. While she played goalkeeper for club and the youth national team, she played in the outfield as a center midfielder at Haverling High School. She recorded 89 goals and 59 assists during her high school career and was named the New York Gatorade Player of the Year after winning the NYSPHSAA Class B state championship as a senior in 2023, heading in the winning goal in the title game. She played ECNL club soccer for the Western New York Flash.

== College career ==
Smith was an immediate starter for the Arkansas Razorbacks as a freshman in 2024. She was named to the Southeastern Conference all-freshman team after keeping 11 clean sheets in 21 games and helped the Razorbacks to the SEC tournament semifinals. She made a season-high nine saves against Stanford in the round of 16 at the NCAA tournament, losing in a penalty shootout. She started 7 games as a sophomore in 2025, but missed most of the season with an injury.

== International career ==
Smith has been called up to the United States youth national team at the under-16 and under-19 levels.

== Honors and awards ==
Arkansas Razorbacks

- Southeastern Conference: 2025

Individual

- SEC all-freshman team: 2024
