= Mia Justus =

American soccer player (born 2002)

- Justus with the Utah Royals in 2026

Personal information
- Full name: Mia Taylin Justus
- Date of birth: September 3, 2002 (age 24)
- Place of birth: Lakewood, Ohio, U.S.
- Height: 5 ft 9 in (1.75 m)
- Position: Goalkeeper

Team information
- Current team: Utah Royals
- Number: 23

Youth career
- IMG Academy

College career
Years	Team	Apps	(Gls)
2021–2022	Florida State Seminoles	14	(0)
2023–2024	Texas Longhorns	48	(0)

Senior career*
Years	Team	Apps	(Gls)
2025–	Utah Royals	9	(0)

International career^{‡}
2017–2018	United States U-16		
2018	United States U-17		
2019–2020	United States U-18	3	(0)
2018–2020	United States U-19	3	(0)
2019–2022	United States U-20	8	(0)
- * Club domestic league appearances and goals as of 04:21, November 10, 2026 (UTC) ‡ National team caps and goals as of August 17, 2022

Mia Taylin Justus (born September 3, 2002) is an American professional soccer player who plays as a goalkeeper for the Utah Royals of the National Women's Soccer League (NWSL). She played college soccer for the Florida State Seminoles and the Texas Longhorns. She was part of the Florida State team that won the 2021 national championship before transferring to Texas, where she led the team to two conference tournament titles. She represented the United States at the youth level, appearing at the 2022 FIFA U-20 Women's World Cup.

== Early life ==
Justus was born and raised in the Cleveland suburb of Bay Village, Ohio one of six children born to Lauren and Leon Justus. She is a cousin of longtime United States men's national team goalkeeper Tim Howard. She attended IMG Academy and first committed to Rutgers before switching to Florida State.

== College career ==
=== Florida State Seminoles ===
Justus spent two years as the understudy to Cristina Roque for the Florida State Seminoles. She kept five clean sheets in her eight starts in the 2021 season, being named to the Atlantic Coast Conference all-freshman team. She was an unused substitute as Florida State won the ACC and national championships with Roque in goal. She kept four shutouts in six starts as a sophomore in 2022, helping the team win the ACC regular-season title. Roque played as the Seminoles won another ACC tournament and reached the NCAA semifinals. After the season, she transferred to the Texas Longhorns to get more playing time.

=== Texas Longhorns ===
Justus started every game for the Longhorns in her junior season in 2023, being named second-team All-Big 12 with 9 shutouts in 26 games. She led the team to the Big 12 championship as the tournament's most valuable player. Texas reached the third round of the NCAA tournament, where they fell to Florida State. With the program's move to the Southeastern Conference in 2024, Justus kept a program-record 12 clean sheets and was named to the All-SEC third team. She led the Longhorns to the SEC championship as the tournament's most valuable player, posting a career-high 14 saves in a 2–1 win against Arkansas in the semifinals.

== Club career ==
=== Utah Royals ===
The Utah Royals announced on December 30, 2024, that the club had signed Justus to her first professional contract on a three-year deal. She reunited with former Seminoles teammate Cristina Roque as backups to starter Mandy McGlynn. On August 3, 2025, following an injury to McGlynn, Justus made her professional debut in a 1–1 draw against the Orlando Pride. On September 28, she made her second appearance and kept her first professional clean sheet in a 2–0 win over Bay FC, earning NWSL Save of the Week for her backpedaling stop on a header. She finished her rookie season with 2 appearances.

On March 14, 2026, Justus began the season as the starter after an injury to McGlynn. On April 3, she kept her first clean sheet of the season in a 1–0 win over the Chicago Stars, receiving a Goal of the Week nomination for the third consecutive week. The following game, she was subbed out for McGlynn after getting a minor injury during a 3–0 victory over the Seattle Reign.

== International career ==
Justus trained with the United States youth national team beginning at the under-14 level in 2015. She traveled for international friendlies with the under-16 team in 2017 and 2018, the under-17 team in 2018, the under-18 team in 2019 and 2020, and the under-19 team in 2018 and 2020. She started for the under-20 team through the quarterfinals of the 2022 CONCACAF Women's U-20 Championship, a tournament the United States won. She started two games at the 2022 FIFA U-20 Women's World Cup, but the team did not make it out of the group stage. She played friendlies for the under-23 team against NWSL clubs in the 2023 preseason. She was called into Futures Camp, practicing alongside the senior national team, in January 2025.

== Honors ==
Florida State Seminoles

- NCAA Division I women's soccer tournament: 2021
- ACC women's soccer tournament: 2021, 2022

Texas Longhorns

- Big 12 Conference women's soccer tournament: 2023
- SEC women's soccer tournament: 2024

United States U-20

- CONCACAF Women's U-20 Championship: 2022

Individual

- Second-team All-Big 12: 2023
- Third-team All-SEC: 2024
- Big 12 tournament Most Outstanding Defensive Player: 2023
- SEC tournament Most Valuable Player: 2024
- ACC all-freshman team: 2021
