= 2022 SEC women's soccer tournament =

Soccer tournament

- Classification: Division I
- Teams: 10
- Matches: 9
- Attendance: 7,628
- Site: Ashton Brosnaham Soccer Complex; Pensacola, Florida
- Champions: South Carolina (3rd title)
- Winning coach: Shelley Smith (3rd title)
- MVP: Heather Hinz (South Carolina)
- Broadcast: SEC Network

2022 SEC women's soccer standings
	Conf.						Overall
Team	W		L		T	PCT	W		L		T	PCT
East
Tennessee ‍‍‍^{y}	7	–	2	–	1	.750	11	–	6	–	2	.632
No. 9 South Carolina ‍‍‡‍^{y}	6	–	3	–	1	.650	15	–	4	–	5	.729
Vanderbilt ‍‍‍^{y}	5	–	3	–	2	.600	12	–	5	–	4	.667
Georgia ‍‍‍^{y}	5	–	3	–	2	.600	13	–	6	–	3	.659
Missouri ‍‍‍	2	–	5	–	3	.350	5	–	8	–	4	.412
Kentucky ‍‍‍	0	–	8	–	2	.100	7	–	9	–	2	.444
Florida ‍‍‍	0	–	9	–	1	.050	2	–	14	–	1	.147
West
No. 4 Alabama ‍‍‍^{y}	10	–	0	–	0	1.000	23	–	3	–	1	.870
No. 8 Arkansas ‍‍‍^{y}	6	–	2	–	2	.700	13	–	4	–	5	.705
LSU ‍‍‍^{y}	4	–	2	–	4	.600	10	–	4	–	7	.643
Mississippi St. ‍‍‍^{y}	4	–	4	–	2	.500	12	–	6	–	4	.636
Texas A&M ‍‍‍^{y}	3	–	4	–	3	.450	9	–	7	–	5	.548
Ole Miss ‍‍‍	3	–	6	–	1	.350	9	–	7	–	4	.550
Auburn ‍‍‍	2	–	6	–	2	.300	6	–	6	–	6	.500
† – Conference champion ‡ – 2022 SEC Tournament champion y – Invited to the NCAA Tournament; As of December 6, 2022; Rankings from United Soccer Coaches Poll; Source:SEC

The 2022 SEC women's soccer tournament was the postseason women's soccer tournament for the Southeastern Conference held from October 30 to November 6, 2022. The tournament was held at the Ashton Brosnaham Soccer Complex in Pensacola, Florida. The ten-team single elimination tournament consisted of four rounds based on seeding from regular season conference play. The Tennessee are the defending champions. The Volunteers were unable to defend their crown, losing to Georgia in the Quarterfinals. South Carolina won the tournament with a 1–0 victory over Alabama in the final. The conference championship is the third for the South Carolina women's soccer program, all of which have come under head coach Shelly Smith. As tournament champions, South Carolina earned the Southeastern Conference's automatic berth into the 2022 NCAA Division I Women's Soccer Tournament.

== Qualification ==
The top 10 teams in the conference qualified for the 2022 Tournament. South Carolina was awarded the second seed as East Division champions. They were awarded the East Division championship after both them and Tennessee finished 5–1–0 in division matches. However, South Carolina won the head-to-head regular season meeting with Tennessee and therefore was awarded the second seed. A tiebreaker was required to determine the fifth and sixth seeds as both Vanderbilt and Georgia finished with 5–3–2 regular season records. Vanderbilt was awarded the fifth seed based on points earned versus common opponents as the two teams tied their regular season meeting. Vanderbilt scored twelve points, while Georgia scored 10.

Seed	School	Conference Record	Conference Points
1	Alabama	10–0–0	30
2	South Carolina	6–3–1	19
3	Tennessee	7–2–1	22
4	Arkansas	6–2–2	20
5	Vanderbilt	5–3–2	17
6	Georgia	5–3–2	17
7	LSU	4–2–4	16
8	Mississippi State	4–4–2	14
9	Texas A&M	3–4–3	12
10	Ole Miss	3–6–1	10

== Bracket ==
First round
7	LSU	0 (0)
10	Ole Miss	0 (3)
8	Mississippi State (a.e.t.)	2
9	Texas A&M	1

Quarterfinals
2	South Carolina	3
10	Ole Miss	0
3	Tennessee	0
6	Georgia	2
1	Alabama	2
8	Mississippi State	0
4	Arkansas	1 (4)
5	Vanderbilt (pen.)	1 (5)

Semifinals
2	South Carolina (pen.)	1 (4)
6	Georgia	1 (1)
1	Alabama	2
5	Vanderbilt	1

Finals
1	Alabama	0
2	South Carolina	1

== Matches ==
=== First round ===
October 30 Match 1	#7 LSU	0–0 (a.e.t.) (0–3 p)	#10 Ole Miss	Pensacola, FL
1:00 p.m. CT	Lindsi Jennings (yellow card) 20'; Shannon Cooke (yellow card) 100'; Maya Gordon (red card) 104'; Rammie Noel (red card) 104'	Report	(yellow card) 31' (yellow-red card) 104' Ramsey Davis; (yellow card) 93' Price Loposer	Stadium: Ashton Brosnaham Soccer Complex; Referee: Jonathan Weiner; Assistant referees: Kendall McCardell; Craig Lowry; Fourth official: Amin Hadzic
	Penalties
	Shannon Cooke (penalty missed); Olivia Wilkes (penalty missed); Brenna McPartlan (penalty missed)		(penalty missed) Mo O'Connor; (penalty scored) Kayla Chatman-Haggerty; (penalty scored) Aubrey Mister; (penalty scored) Price Loposer

October 30 Match 2	#8 Mississippi State	2–1 (a.e.t.)	#9 Texas A&M	Pensacola, FL
3:30 p.m. CT	Rylie Combs (yellow card) 10'; Gwen Mummert 38'; Alexis Gutierrez (yellow card) 93'; Jojo Ngongo 100'	Report	(yellow card) 38' Team; 86' Mia Pante; (yellow card) 89' Carissa Boeckmann	Stadium: Ashton Brosnaham Soccer Complex

=== Quarterfinals ===
November 1 Match 3	#2 South Carolina	3–0	#10 Ole Miss	Pensacola, FL
12:00 p.m. CT	Catherine Barry 29'; Megan Speihs 60'; Micah Bryant (yellow card) 77'; Payton Patrick 81'	Report		Stadium: Ashton Brosnaham Soccer Complex; Referee: Amin Hadzic; Assistant referees: Criag Lowry; Sam Bilbo; Fourth official: Aaron Hernandez

November 1 Match 4	#3 Tennessee	0–2	#6 Georgia	Pensacola, FL
2:30 p.m. CT		Report	20' Dani Murguia; 34' Tori Penn	Stadium: Ashton Brosnaham Soccer Complex; Referee: Anya Voigt; Assistant referees: Katarzyna Wasiak; Matthew Rodman; Fourth official: Samantha Martinez

November 1 Match 5	#1 Alabama	2–0	#8 Mississippi State	Pensacola, FL
5:00 p.m. CT	Ashlynn Serepca 14'; Macy Clem 33'; Reyna Reyes (yellow card) 55'	Report	(yellow card) 44' Macey Hodge	Stadium: Ashton Brosnaham Soccer Complex; Referee: Cory Rockwell; Assistant referees: Kendall McCardell; Craig Lowry; Fourth official: Amin Hadzic

November 1 Match 6	#4 Arkansas	1–1 (a.e.t.) (4–5 p)	#5 Vanderbilt	Pensacola, FL
7:30 p.m. CT	Shana Flynn 6'; Ella Riley (yellow card) 60'; Ainsley Erzen (yellow card) 99'; Jessica De Filippo (yellow card) 107'	Report	(yellow card) 6' Sara Wojdelko; (yellow card) 40' Raegan Kelley; 70' Peyton Cutshall	Stadium: Ashton Brosnaham Soccer Complex; Attendance: 2,190; Referee: Samantha Martinez; Assistant referees: Matthew Rodman; Katarzyna Wasiak; Fourth official: Jonathan Weiner
	Penalties
	Emilee Hauser (penalty scored); Shana Flynn (penalty missed); Ellie Podojil (penalty scored); Anna Podojil (penalty scored); Sierra Cota-Yarde (penalty scored); Jessica De Filippo (penalty missed)		(penalty missed) Alex Kerr; (penalty scored) Brooke VanDyck; (penalty scored) Ella Shamburger; (penalty scored) Ella Zimmerman; (penalty scored) Abi Brighton; (penalty scored) Kate Devine

=== Semifinals ===
November 3 Match 7	#1 Alabama	2–1	#5 Vanderbilt	Pensacola, FL
5:00 p.m. CT	Riley Mattingly Parker 19', 90' (pen.); Team (yellow card) 89'	Report	15' Peyton Cutshall; (yellow card) 90' Abena Aidoo; (red card) 90' Team	Stadium: Ashton Brosnaham Soccer Complex; Referee: Tori Penso; Assistant referees: John Villalobos; Katarzyna Wasiak; Fourth official: Anya Voigt

November 3 Match 8	#2 South Carolina	1–1 (a.e.t.) (4–1 p)	#6 Georgia	Pensacola, FL
7:30 p.m. CT	Catherine Barry 53'	Report	75' (pen.) Dani Murguia	Stadium: Ashton Brosnaham Soccer Complex; Attendance: 2,413; Referee: Johnathan Weiner; Assistant referees: Jennifer Politz; Craig Lowry; Fourth official: Samantha Martinez
	Penalties
	Catherine Barry (penalty scored); Jyllissa Harris (penalty scored); Samantha Chang (penalty scored); Camryn Dixon (penalty scored)		(penalty scored) Abby Boyan; (penalty missed) Tori Penn; (penalty missed) Dani Murguia

=== Final ===
November 6 Match 9	#1 Alabama	0–1	#2 South Carolina	Pensacola, FL
1:00 p.m. CT	Macy Clem (yellow card) 60'; Gianna Paul (yellow card) 75'	Report	(yellow card) 23' Taylor Jacobson; (yellow card) 36' Gracie Falla; 57' Brianna Bhem	Stadium: Ashton Brosnaham Soccer Complex; Attendance: 3,025; Referee: Samantha Martinez; Assistant referees: Katarzyna Wasiak; John Villalobos; Fourth official: Jesus Hernandez-Balbas

== Statistics ==
=== Goalscorers ===
There were 18 goals scored in 9 matches, for an average of 2 goals per match (as of November 6, 2022).

2 goals

- Riley Mattingly Parker – Alabama
- Dani Murguia – Georgia
- Catherine Barry – South Carolina
- Peyton Cutshall – Vanderbilt

1 goal

- Macy Clem – Alabama
- Ashlynn Serepca – Alabama
- Shana Flynn – Arkansas
- Tori Penn – Georgia
- Gwen Mummert – Mississippi State
- Jojo Ngongo – Mississippi State
- Brianna Bhem – South Carolina
- Payton Patrick – South Carolina
- Megan Speihs – South Carolina
- Mia Pante – Texas A&M

== All-Tournament team ==
Player	Team
Jordan Brown	Georgia
Dani Murguia	Georgia
Peyton Cutshall	Vanderbilt
Sara Wojdelko	Vanderbilt
McKinley Crone	Alabama
Sasha Pickard	Alabama
Ashlynn Serepca	Alabama
Catherine Barry	South Carolina
Samantha Chang	South Carolina
Jyllissa Harris	South Carolina
**Heather Hinz**	South Carolina

MVP in bold
