= Holly Ward (soccer) =

Canadian soccer player (born 2003)

- Ward in 2026

Personal information
- Full name: Holly Noushin Ward
- Date of birth: October 25, 2003 (age 23)
- Place of birth: Vancouver, British Columbia, Canada
- Height: 5 ft 6 in (1.68 m)
- Position: Forward

Team information
- Current team: Seattle Reign
- Number: 12

Youth career
- Portland Foothills SC
- Mountain United FC (Note: Mountain United FC merged with four other Burnaby clubs to form Burnaby FC in 2022.)
- Whitecaps FC Girls Elite

College career
Years	Team	Apps	(Gls)
2021–2024	Texas Longhorns	90	(17)

Senior career*
Years	Team	Apps	(Gls)
2022–2023	Nautsaʼmawt FC (Note: Varsity FC changed its name to Nautsaʼmawt FC in 2023.)	9+	(1+)
2024	Burnaby FC	6	(1)
2025	Vancouver Rise	25	(6)
2026–	Seattle Reign	19	(0)

International career^{‡}
2022	Canada U-20	9	(4)
2025–	Canada	10	(2)
Medal record
Representing Canada
CONCACAF Women's U-20 Championship
Bronze medal – third place	2022 Dominican Republic
- * Club domestic league appearances and goals as of 16:38, November 8, 2026 (UTC) ‡ National team caps and goals as of June 9, 2026

Holly Noushin Ward (born October 25, 2003) is a Canadian professional soccer player who plays as a forward for Seattle Reign FC of the National Women's Soccer League (NWSL) and the Canada national team.

Ward played college soccer for the Texas Longhorns, winning the Big 12 tournament in 2023 and the SEC tournament in 2024. She began her professional career in 2025 with hometown club Vancouver Rise in the inaugural season of the Northern Super League (NSL), and scored the winning goal in the league's first championship final. She joined Seattle Reign in March 2026.

Ward represented Canada at the 2022 FIFA U-20 Women's World Cup. She made her senior debut in April 2025 and that June became the first NSL player to score for the national team. She was named to her first senior tournament squad for the 2026 SheBelieves Cup, at which Canada finished as runners-up.

== Early life ==
Ward was born in Vancouver to a father from Montreal, Quebec, and a mother from Boston, Massachusetts. Her father played university soccer at Trinity Western University from 1987 to 1992. The family moved to Portland, Oregon, when she was three, and she began playing youth soccer at age four with Portland Foothills SC. Although her parents encouraged her to try other sports, Ward has said she was set on soccer from an early age, playing on a boys' team at four or five and taking part in indoor, outdoor and beach versions of the game. Her favorite players as a child were Neymar and Mallory Pugh, and she looked up to Canadian internationals Christine Sinclair and Desiree Scott. At age 13, she moved back to Canada with her family, settling in North Vancouver, and later attended Burnaby Central Secondary School.

== Youth career ==
In Canada, Ward played for Mountain United FC, helping the club win at the 2018 Canadian national championships; she assisted both goals in the final and was named the team's most valuable player. In August 2018, she joined the Whitecaps FC Girls Elite academy, which later became the Rise FC Academy. While in the program, she also helped coach younger age groups.

== College career ==
Ward with Texas

Ward played four seasons for the Texas Longhorns at the University of Texas at Austin from 2021 to 2024, scoring 17 goals in 90 matches. She started all 22 matches as a freshman in 2021, scoring her first college goal in a 3–0 win over SIUE. As a sophomore, she scored three goals, including the winner in a 4–0 Big 12 tournament quarterfinal win over Kansas State.

As a junior in 2023, Ward scored four goals and added four assists in 24 matches, starting the last 16 of the season. She was directly involved in four goals as Texas won the Big 12 tournament, including the third goal in a 3–1 win over BYU in the final.

After Texas moved to the Southeastern Conference in 2024, Ward scored nine goals and recorded seven assists in 23 matches as a senior. She scored twice against LSU in the quarterfinals of the SEC tournament, which the Longhorns won in their first season in the conference. In the first round of the NCAA tournament, she scored all four goals in a 4–1 win over Boston University, a program record for a single NCAA tournament game. She scored her final college goal in a 3–2 second-round loss to Michigan State.

== Club career ==
=== League1 British Columbia ===
In 2022, Ward played for Varsity FC in League1 British Columbia, and she remained with the club in 2023 when it was renamed Nautsaʼmawt FC. She joined Burnaby FC for the 2024 season.

=== Vancouver Rise ===
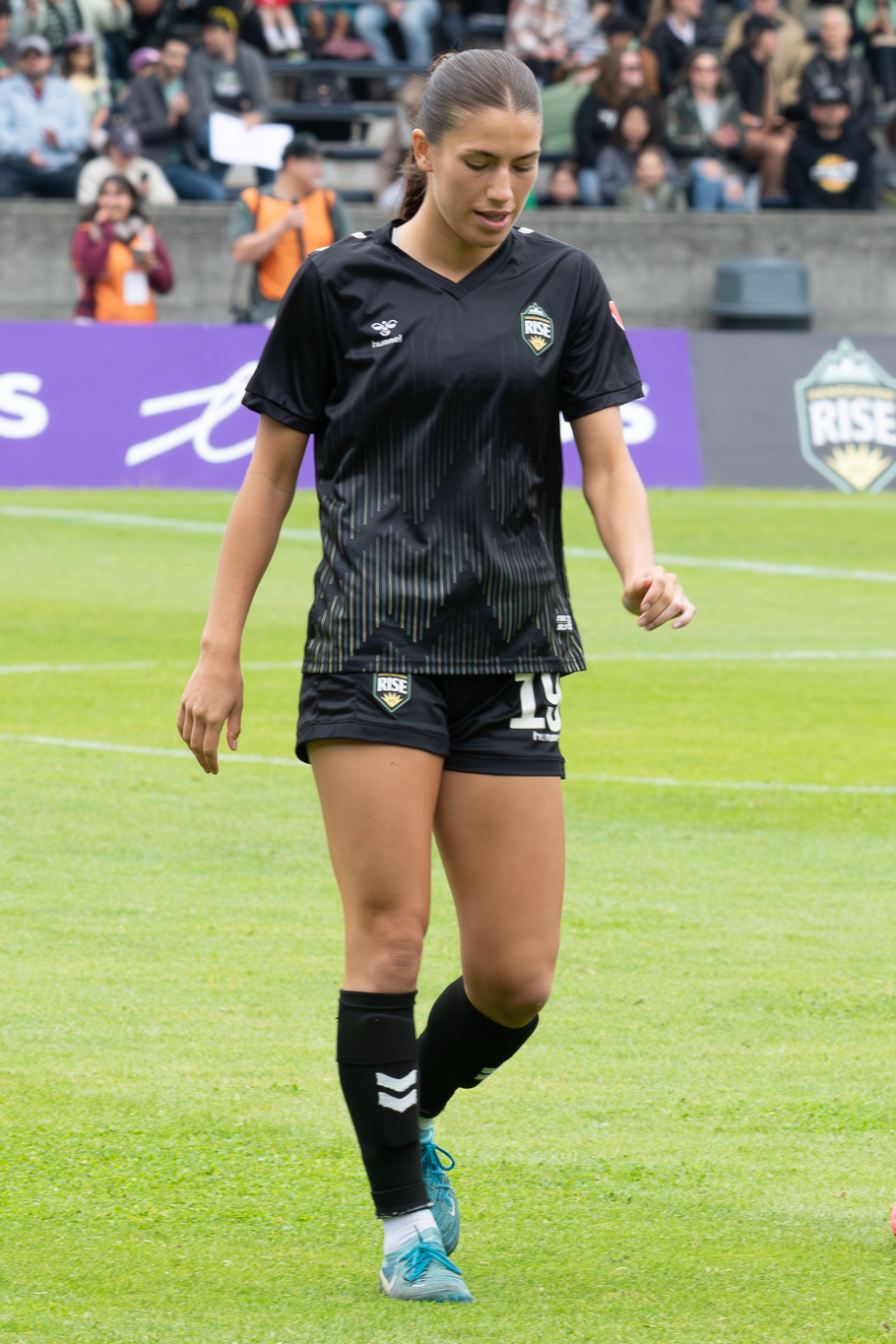
Ward playing for Vancouver Rise in 2025

Ward trained with Racing Louisville FC as a non-roster invitee during the NWSL preseason in January 2025. The following month, she signed her first professional contract with Vancouver Rise ahead of the inaugural Northern Super League season. On April 16, 2025, she made her professional debut in the league's first match, against Calgary Wild FC at BC Place, and drew the penalty that Quinn converted for the only goal of a 1–0 win, the first goal in NSL history. She scored her first professional goals on July 19, scoring twice in a 6–0 win over Halifax Tides FC.

In the second leg of the playoff semifinal against Ottawa Rapid FC on November 8, Ward scored a late goal that levelled the aggregate score at 3–3, and Vancouver advanced to the inaugural final on penalties. A week later, she scored the 68th-minute winner in a 2–1 victory over AFC Toronto in the NSL final, as Vancouver became the first winner of the Diana B. Matheson Cup. Including the playoffs, she appeared in all 28 of Vancouver's matches that season, 27 as a starter, and finished with eight goals and five assists. In December 2025, she was one of eight nominees for the Canada Soccer Player of the Year award.

Ward has said she left college lacking confidence, both as a player and as a person, and that improving her mental approach, rather than any specific target, was her main aim in her first professional season. On leaving the club in March 2026, she said that "having a professional league in Canada and playing for Rise FC in my hometown has been a dream come true".

=== Seattle Reign ===
On March 13, 2026, Vancouver Rise transferred Ward to Seattle Reign for an undisclosed fee, and she signed a contract through the 2027 NWSL season. Rise sporting director Stephanie Labbé called the sale "a landmark moment for our club", saying Ward was the first player from its academy to begin her professional career with her hometown team and earn a transfer. Reign general manager Lesle Gallimore described her as "an exciting young forward with tremendous upside" and pointed to "her pace, work rate and creativity in the attacking third". As a dual Canadian and American citizen, Ward did not occupy an international roster slot.

Ward made her Reign debut as a substitute in a 2–0 away loss to the Portland Thorns, playing 21 minutes. On March 28, 2026, she made her first start for the club, playing on the left wing in a 2–1 win over Racing Louisville at One Spokane Stadium.

== International career ==
=== Youth ===
Ward attended three Canada under-17 camps in 2019 and was selected for the squad for the 2020 CONCACAF Women's U-17 Championship, which was cancelled because of the COVID-19 pandemic before the roster was officially announced. At the 2022 CONCACAF Women's U-20 Championship in the Dominican Republic, she scored four goals, including the winning penalty against Panama in the quarterfinals, as Canada won the bronze medal. She was then named to Canada's 21-player squad for the 2022 FIFA U-20 Women's World Cup in Costa Rica.

=== Senior ===
Ward with Canada in 2026

Ward made her senior debut on April 8, 2025, at Starlight Stadium in Langford, entering as a 64th-minute substitute in a friendly against Argentina that became the first defeat of Casey Stoney's tenure as head coach. On June 3, she scored and set up another goal in a 3–1 win over Haiti in Montreal, a performance for which she was named player of the match, and became the first NSL player to score for Canada. Three weeks later, in her third senior appearance, she curled in a 74th-minute shot to put Canada ahead 2–1 in an eventual 4–1 win over Costa Rica at BMO Field in Toronto. She closed the year by playing most of both matches in a two-game friendly series against Japan in Nagasaki, and finished 2025 with seven caps.

In February 2026, Ward was named to Canada's squad for the SheBelieves Cup, her first senior tournament. She started the opening 4–1 win over Colombia in Nashville and appeared in all three of Canada's matches, which also included a 1–0 loss to the United States and a scoreless draw with Argentina that Canada won 3–2 on penalties, as Canada finished second. An injury ruled her out of Canada's squad for the FIFA Series in Brazil in April. She was recalled for a June training camp in Costa Rica, but did not play in the 6–0 friendly win over the hosts in Cartago on June 9.

== Style of play ==
In June 2025, after Ward's first camps with Canada, Stoney described her as "fearless" and "a bit of an old school winger", noting that she is direct, can go inside or outside her defender, and can play with both feet. Vancouver head coach Anja Heiner-Møller said that when Ward receives the ball to feet, "she sees opportunity first … and she goes for it".

== Career statistics ==
=== International goals ===
Scores and results list Canada's goal tally first; the score column indicates the score after each Ward goal.

List of international goals scored by Holly Ward
No.	Date	Venue	Opponent	Score	Result	Competition	Ref.
1	June 3, 2025	Saputo Stadium, Montreal, Canada	Haiti	2–0	3–1	Friendly	
2	June 27, 2025	BMO Field, Toronto, Canada	Costa Rica	2–1	4–1	Friendly	

== Honors and awards ==
Texas Longhorns

- Big 12 Conference women's soccer tournament: 2023
- SEC women's soccer tournament: 2024

Vancouver Rise

- Northern Super League: 2025

Canada U-20

- CONCACAF Women's U-20 Championship third place: 2022

Canada

- SheBelieves Cup runner-up: 2026

Individual

- Big 12 tournament all-tournament team: 2023
- SEC tournament all-tournament team: 2024
