= Croix Bethune =

American soccer player (born 2001)

- Bethune with the Kansas City Current in 2026

Personal information
- Full name: Croix Collette Bethune
- Date of birth: March 14, 2001 (age 25)
- Place of birth: Alpharetta, Georgia, U.S.
- Height: 5 ft 3 in (1.60 m)
- Position: Attacking midfielder

Team information
- Current team: Kansas City Current
- Number: 8

Youth career
- Concorde Fire

College career
Years	Team	Apps	(Gls)
2021–2022	USC Trojans	48	(26)
2023	Georgia Bulldogs	15	(4)

Senior career*
Years	Team	Apps	(Gls)
2024–2025	Washington Spirit	37	(7)
2026–	Kansas City Current	26	(4)

International career^{‡}
- United States U-15
2017–2018	United States U-17	15	(7)
2024–	United States	7	(1)
Medal record
Women's soccer
Representing the United States
Olympic Games
Gold medal – first place	2024 Paris	Team
- * Club domestic league appearances and goals as of 16:46, November 14, 2026 (UTC) ‡ National team caps and goals as of January 27, 2026

Croix Collette Bethune (/ˈkrɔɪ bəˈθuːn/ CROY bə-THOON; born March 14, 2001) is an American professional soccer player who plays as an attacking midfielder for the Kansas City Current of the National Women's Soccer League (NWSL) and the United States national team.

Bethune played college soccer for the USC Trojans and Georgia Bulldogs, twice being named first-team All-American. She was selected third overall by the Washington Spirit in the 2024 NWSL Draft, being named NWSL Rookie of the Year and NWSL Midfielder of the Year after tying the league's single-season assist record in her rookie campaign. Despite a meniscus injury, she was named to the NWSL Best XI both seasons she played with the Spirit. She was traded to the Current in 2026, breaking the league's single-season assist record in her debut campaign. She was named NWSL Midfielder of the Year for the second time and won the NWSL Championship the same season.

Bethune was part of the United States squad that won the gold medal at the 2024 Paris Olympics.

== Early life ==
Bethune was raised in Alpharetta, Georgia, the daughter of United States Air Force members Richard and Jean Bethune, and has a brother. She started playing soccer at age three or four. When she was four, her parents were stationed in Stratford-upon-Avon, England, for three and a half years, where she played with boys because there was no girls' team. She played club soccer for the ECNL's Concorde Fire Soccer Club in Atlanta and was named to the national Best XI in 2017 and 2018. She played one season of high school soccer at Alpharetta High School. She also played basketball in high school but chose to focus on soccer after recovering from an ACL tear while training with the national under-17 team. She committed to the University of Southern California over schools including Florida State, Duke, and UCLA.

== College career ==
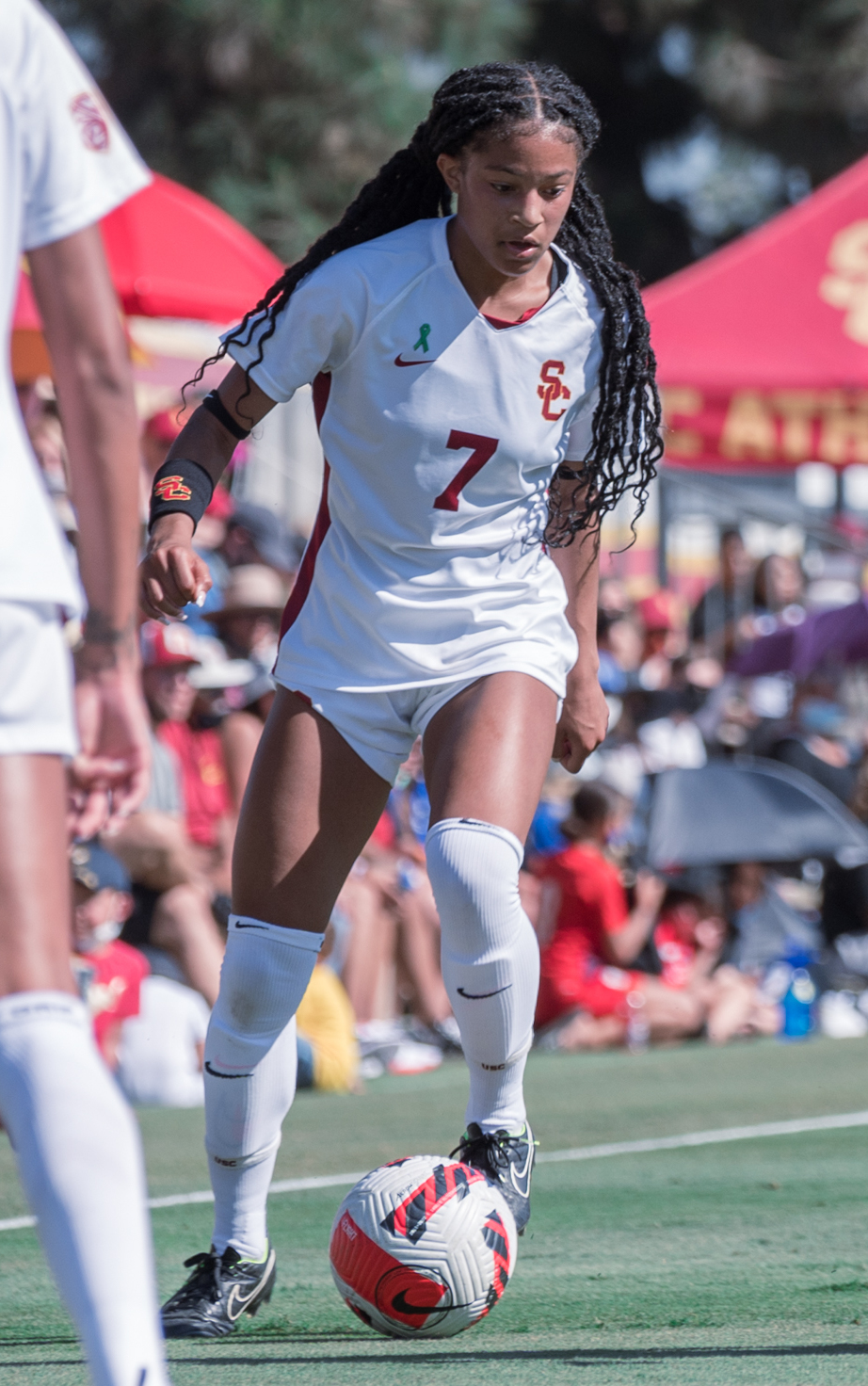
Bethune playing for the USC Trojans in 2021

=== USC Trojans ===
Bethune played three seasons for the USC Trojans. She missed her freshman 2019 season due to a second ACL tear. On her debut for the Trojans, she provided two assists in a 4–3 overtime win over BYU in spring 2021. She scored 16 goals in the fall 2021 season, the third most in a season in program history, including a nine-minute hat trick in the first round of the NCAA tournament. In both 2021 and 2022, as captain of the Trojans, she was named first-team All-Pac-12, first-team All-American, and the Pac-12 Midfielder of the Year.

=== Georgia Bulldogs ===
Bethune transferred to the Georgia Bulldogs for the 2023 season, reuniting with former USC coach Keidane McAlpine, after tearing her ACL for a third time while finishing her undergraduate degree at USC. She led Georgia to its first postseason title in program history at the SEC tournament in 2023, where she scored an equalizer against Kentucky in the quarterfinals and a last-minute winner over Texas A&M in the semifinals, and was named the tournament's most valuable player. She was named second-team All-SEC and second-team All-American.

== Club career ==
=== Washington Spirit ===
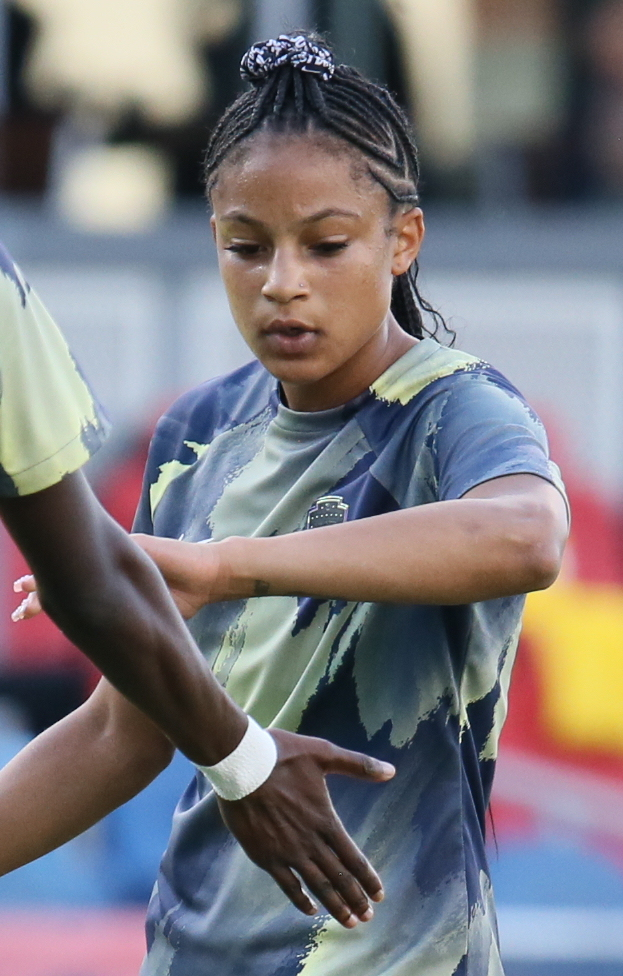
Bethune with the Washington Spirit in 2024

The Washington Spirit selected Bethune third overall in the 2024 NWSL Draft; the Spirit acquired the pick by trading Sam Staab to the Chicago Red Stars. She signed a three-year contract with the option to extend another year. She made her professional debut in the season opener against the Seattle Reign on March 17, starting in the attacking midfield role that previously belonged to the recently traded Ashley Sanchez. The following week, she scored her first professional goal in late stoppage time to secure a 2–1 win over Bay FC. On May 2, she assisted on three goals in a 4–2 win over the Chicago Red Stars, becoming the youngest NWSL player to record three assists in one match. On May 24, she scored a goal and broke the rookie assist record with her seventh assist of the season during a 3–2 win over the Seattle Reign. On June 15, she struck in late stoppage time to salvage a 1–1 draw against the San Diego Wave, earning NWSL Goal of the Week.

On August 25, 2024, Bethune provided her tenth assist of the season in a 4–1 win over the Kansas City Current, tying the league record for assists in a season set by Tobin Heath in 2016. Five of those assists were to Ouleymata Sarr, the most between two NWSL teammates since 2019. Four days later, she tore her meniscus while throwing the first pitch at a Washington Nationals baseball game, ending her rookie season after 17 appearances with 5 goals. Without her, the Spirit finished as regular season and playoffs runner-up to the Orlando Pride. Bethune was named NWSL Rookie of the Month a record four times (March/April, May, June, and August). Despite missing the last two months of the season, she was voted NWSL Rookie of the Year and Midfielder of the Year and selected to the NWSL Best XI First Team.

On April 26, 2025, after eight months out of action, Bethune returned from injury in the game against Gotham FC. She scored her first goal since the injury on August 23, striking into the net after a crafty dribble in a 3–2 win over Bay FC before an NWSL record crowd at Oracle Park. She finished the season with 2 goals and 2 assists in 20 regular-season games as the Spirit again placed second in the league. In the playoffs, she scored late to secure a 2–0 win over the Portland Thorns in the semifinals, before losing 1–0 to Gotham FC in the 2025 NWSL Championship. She was named to the NWSL Best XI Second Team at the end of the season.

=== Kansas City Current ===
Bethune requested a trade during the offseason. One February 11, 2026, she was transferred to the Kansas City Current for US$900,000 in intraleague transfer funds and US$100,000 in allocation money. This move and Claire Hutton's concurrent but separate move from the Current to Bay FC were the third and second largest transfers in NWSL history at the time. She made a goalscoring debut for the Current on her 25th birthday, equalizing in a season-opening 2–1 win over the Utah Royals. On July 3, she marked her 50th career regular-season appearance with two assists in a 3–0 win over expansion team Denver Summit. Later that month, she made her seventh assist of the season in a 5–1 victory over Racing Louisville, setting a new club single-season record. On October 25, she recorded her 11th assist for the Current in a 2–1 win over former club Washington Spirit, breaking the league record for assists in a season she had previously tied.

== International career ==
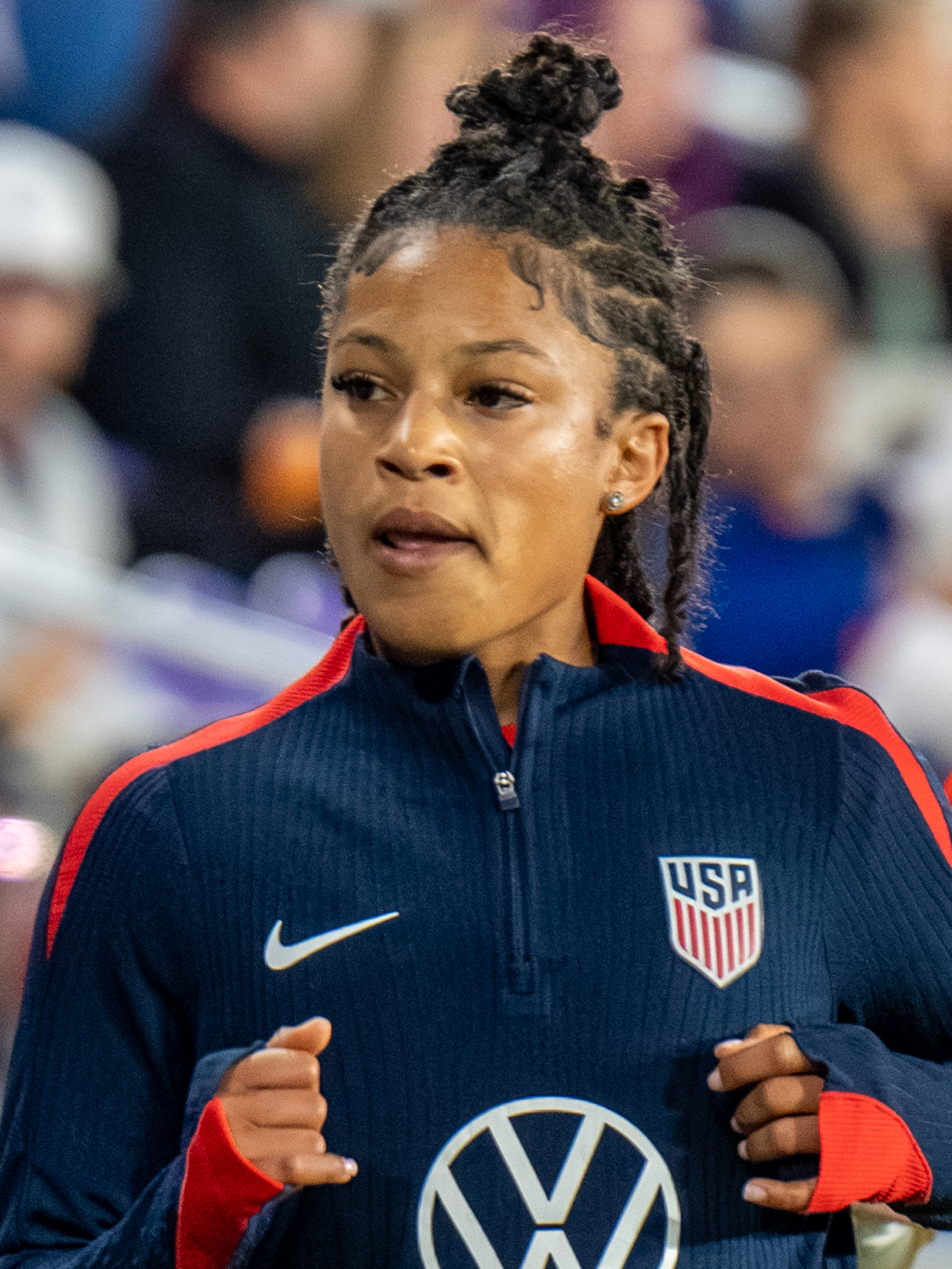
Bethune with the United States in 2025

=== Youth national team ===
Bethune was first called up to a youth national team training camp with the United States national under-15 team at age 13 in March 2015. She helped win the 2016 CONCACAF Girls' U-15 Championship, where she was named to the tournament's Best XI team. She was the youngest player on the under-17 team in November 2016. She played for the winning team at the 2018 CONCACAF Women's U-17 Championship and competed at the 2018 FIFA U-17 Women's World Cup. She played friendlies for the under-23 team in 2022.

=== Senior national team ===
Bethune was called into her first senior national team camp as a training player in June 2024. Later that month she was named as an alternate to the national team for the 2024 Summer Olympics in France. Bethune made her first USWNT appearance on July 13, 2024, in the 81st minute of a friendly Olympic sendoff against Mexico. She was elevated to the main roster at the Olympics because of an injury to Jaedyn Shaw and made her Olympic debut in the 79th minute of the third group stage game against Australia on July 31. The United States went on to win the gold medal, defeating Brazil 1–0 in the final on a goal from Mallory Swanson.

On January 27, 2026, Bethune scored her first USWNT goal in a 5–0 friendly win over Chile.

== Style of play ==
An attacking midfielder, Bethune possesses excellent vision and technical skill which make her a standout passer.

== Career statistics ==
=== Club ===
As of match played November 15, 2026

Appearances and goals by club, season and competition
Club	Season	League			NWSL Playoffs		Continental		Other		Total	
Club	Season	Division	Apps	Goals	Apps	Goals	Apps	Goals	Apps	Goals	Apps	Goals
Washington Spirit	2024	NWSL	17	5	0	0	—		0	0	17	5
Washington Spirit	2025	NWSL	20	3	3	1	4 (Note: Appearances in CONCACAF W Champions Cup)	1	0	0	27	5
Washington Spirit	Total		37	8	3	1	4	1	0	0	44	10
Kansas City Current	2026	NWSL	26	4	2	1	—		1 (Note: Appearance in NWSL Challenge Cup)	0	29	6
Career total			63	12	5	2	4	1	1	0	73	16

=== International ===
As of match played January 27, 2026

Appearances and goals by national team and year
National team	Year	Apps	Goals
United States	2024	3	0
United States	2025	2	0
United States	2026	2	1
Total		7	1

List of international goals scored by Croix Bethune
No.	Date	Venue	Opponent	Score	Result	Competition	Ref.
1	January 27, 2026	Santa Barbara, California, United States	Chile	1–0	5–0	Friendly	

== Honors and awards ==
Georgia Bulldogs

- SEC women's soccer tournament: 2023

Washington Spirit

- NWSL Challenge Cup: 2025

Kansas City Current

- NWSL Championship: 2026

United States U-15

- CONCACAF Girls' U-15 Championship: 2016

United States U-17

- CONCACAF Women's U-17 Championship: 2018

United States

- Summer Olympic Games gold medal: 2024

Individual

- NWSL Midfielder of the Year: 2024, 2026
- NWSL Rookie of the Year: 2024
- NWSL Best XI First Team: 2024, 2026
- NWSL Best XI Second Team: 2025
- NWSL Team of the Month: March/April 2024, May 2024, June 2024 September 2025
- NWSL Rookie of the Month: March/April 2024, May 2024, June 2024, August 2024
- First-team All-American: 2021, 2022
- Second-team All-American: 2023
- First-team All-Pac-12: 2020, 2021, 2022
- Second-team All-SEC: 2023
- Pac-12 Midfielder of the Year: 2021, 2022
- SEC tournament MVP: 2023
