= Jyllissa Harris =

American soccer player (born 2000)

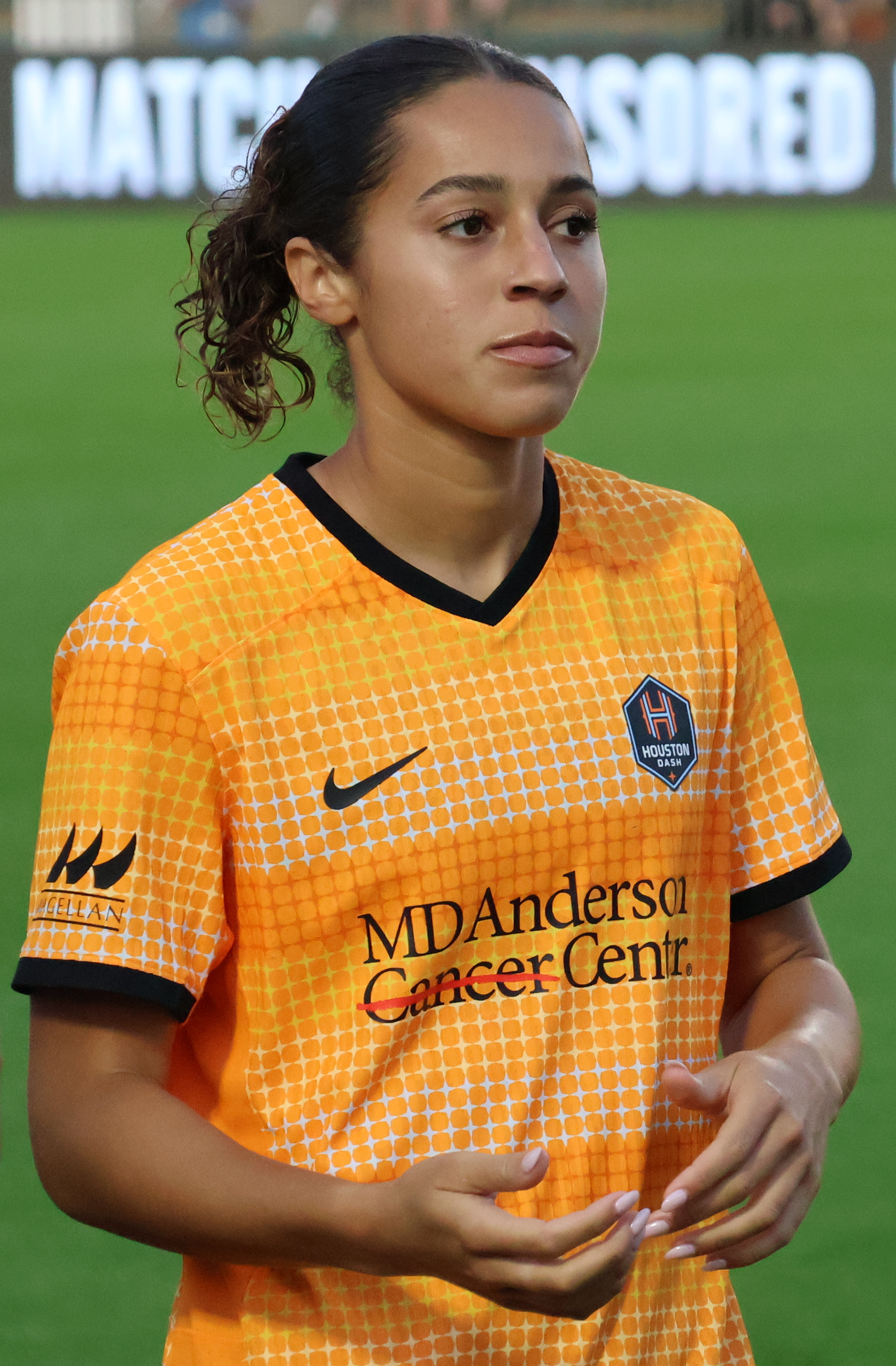
- Harris with the Houston Dash in 2024

Personal information
- Full name: Jyllissa Kyndhall Harris
- Date of birth: April 8, 2000 (age 26)
- Place of birth: Hazlet, New Jersey, United States
- Height: 5 ft 8 in (1.73 m)
- Position: Defender

Team information
- Current team: Ottawa Rapid FC (on loan from Houston Dash)
- Number: 33

College career
Years	Team	Apps	(Gls)
2018–2022	South Carolina Gamecocks	107	(16)

Senior career*
Years	Team	Apps	(Gls)
2023–	Houston Dash	12	(0)
2025–	→ Ottawa Rapid FC (loan)	50	(2)
- * Club domestic league appearances and goals as of October 30, 2026

Jyllissa Kyndhall Harris (born April 8, 2000) is an American professional soccer player who plays as a defender for Northern Super League side Ottawa Rapid, on loan from the Houston Dash of the National Women's Soccer League. She played college soccer for the South Carolina Gamecocks.

== Early career ==
Harris was born in Hazlet, New Jersey, and attended Red Bank Catholic High School. She was a nominee for the High School All-American Game in 2017 and competed for the PDA Gunners and Sky Blue of the Elite Clubs National League (ECNL).

== College career ==
Harris played college soccer for the South Carolina Gamecocks from 2018 to 2022.

Harris attended the University of South Carolina where she set an NCAA Record for all-time minutes (9,395). At South Carolina, Harris was No. 1 all-time starter (105 games) and No. 1 in all-time games played (107, No. 3 in NCAA). Across her five-year career, Harris started in all but two of her 107 games played and passed the 2000-minute mark twice. Harris was awarded the Top Drawer Soccer Best XI selection as well as a United Soccer Coaches Second Team All-American nod.

== Club career ==
Harris was selected by the Houston Dash in the 2023 NWSL Draft. In her first season with Houston, Harris recorded 47 total passes with an 80.9% success rate. In November 2023, the Dash exercised a contract option for Harris. In March 2025, she was loaned to Canadian Northern Super League club Ottawa Rapid FC. At the end of the 2025 season, she won the league's Defender of the Year award and was named to the league's Team of the Season. After the 2025 season, she returned to Houston, signing an extension. On January 26, 2026, having played 2,415 minutes during the previous season, it was announced that her loan with the Rapid had been extended for the 2026 season. Harris provided the assist for Ottawa's goal in a 3-1 loss against Halifax Tides FC on April 25, 2026, the Rapid's opening game of the 2026 season. She scored her first goal for the Rapid on May 29, 2026, the first goal of a 2-1 win over the Halifax Tides.

== Personal life ==
Harris graduated from South Carolina in May 2022 with a degree in Childhood Education.

In September 2022, Harris and other female student-athletes at South Carolina were honored during a South Carolina football game before being yelled at to "get off the field"; the moment went viral as Harris spoke out on social media regarding the incident.

== Career statistics ==
As of match played October 30, 2026

Appearances and goals by club, season and competition
Club	Season	League			Playoffs (Note: Includes NWSL Playoffs)		Cup (Note: Includes the NWSL Challenge Cup)		Other		Total	
Club	Season	Division	Apps	Goals	Apps	Goals	Apps	Goals	Apps	Goals	Apps	Goals
Houston Dash	2023	NWSL	1	0	—		6	0	—		7	0
Houston Dash	2024	NWSL	11	0	—		—		3 (Note: Includes the NWSL x Liga MX Femenil Summer Cup)	0	14	0
Houston Dash	2025	NWSL	0	0	—		—		—		0	0
Houston Dash	Career total		12	0	6	0	0	0	3	0	21	0
Ottawa Rapid FC (loan)	2025	Northern Super League	25	0	2	0	—		—		27	0
Ottawa Rapid FC (loan)	2026	Northern Super League	25	2	0	0	—		—		25	2
Ottawa Rapid FC (loan)	Career total		50	2	2	0	0	0	0	0	52	2
Career total			62	2	5	0	6	0	3	0	73	2

== Honors ==
South Carolina Gamecocks

- SEC women's soccer tournament: 2019, 2022

Individual

- SEC All-Freshman Team: 2018
- United Soccer Coaches All-American Second Team: 2022
