= 2024 SEC women's soccer tournament =

Soccer tournament

- Classification: Division I
- Teams: 12
- Matches: 11
- Attendance: 7,685
- Site: Ashton Brosnaham Soccer Complex; Pensacola, Florida
- Champions: Texas (1st title)
- Winning coach: Angela Kelly (5th title)
- MVP: Mia Justus (Texas)
- Broadcast: SEC Network

2024 SEC women's soccer standings
	Conf.						Overall
Team	W		L		T	PCT	W		L		T	PCT
No. 10 Mississippi St. ‍†‍‍^{y}	10	–	0	–	0	1.000	19	–	3	–	0	.864
No. 9 Arkansas ‍‍‍^{y}	8	–	1	–	1	.850	16	–	2	–	3	.833
No. 21 Texas ‍‍‡‍^{y}	6	–	3	–	1	.650	17	–	4	–	2	.783
No. 23 South Carolina ‍‍‍^{y}	5	–	2	–	3	.650	11	–	4	–	7	.659
No. 25 Auburn ‍‍‍^{y}	4	–	2	–	4	.600	12	–	4	–	5	.690
No. 15 Vanderbilt ‍‍‍^{y}	4	–	2	–	4	.600	10	–	4	–	7	.643
Georgia ‍‍‍^{y}	3	–	3	–	4	.500	8	–	7	–	6	.524
Kentucky ‍‍‍^{y}	3	–	3	–	4	.500	12	–	5	–	4	.667
Tennessee ‍‍‍^{y}	3	–	4	–	3	.450	9	–	7	–	4	.550
Alabama ‍‍‍	2	–	3	–	5	.450	10	–	6	–	5	.595
LSU ‍‍‍^{y}	3	–	5	–	2	.400	9	–	9	–	3	.500
Texas A&M ‍‍‍	3	–	5	–	2	.400	8	–	9	–	2	.474
Missouri ‍‍‍	3	–	6	–	1	.350	5	–	10	–	2	.353
Oklahoma ‍‍‍	3	–	6	–	1	.350	10	–	7	–	1	.583
Florida ‍‍‍	1	–	7	–	2	.200	4	–	8	–	6	.389
Ole Miss ‍‍‍	0	–	9	–	1	.050	5	–	13	–	1	.289
† – Conference champion ‡ – 2024 SEC Tournament champion y – Invited to the NCAA Tournament; As of December 10, 2024; Rankings from United Soccer Coaches Poll; Source:SEC

The 2024 SEC women's soccer tournament was the postseason women's soccer tournament for the Southeastern Conference held from November 3 to November 10, 2024. The tournament was held at the Ashton Brosnaham Soccer Complex in Pensacola, Florida. The twelve-team single elimination tournament consisted of four rounds based on seeding from regular season conference play. The Georgia Bulldogs are the defending champions. The Bulldogs were unable to defend their crown as the seventh seed, losing to second seed Arkansas in the Quarterfinals. third seed Texas went on to win the tournament with a 2–1 overtime victory over Arkansas in the final. The conference championship is the first SEC title for the Texas women's soccer program, and first for head coach Angela Kelly. However, Kelly has won four previous SEC tournament titles with Tennessee. This is Texas' fourth overall conference title, as the won three Big 12 tournament titles before moving to the SEC. As tournament champions, Texas earned the Southeastern Conference's automatic berth into the 2024 NCAA Division I women's soccer tournament.

== Qualification ==
The top twelve teams in the conference qualified for the 2024 Tournament. The top four teams were awarded byes into the Quarterfinals. Teams were seeded based on regular season records. A tiebreaker was required to determine the fifth and sixth seeds as Auburn and Vanderbilt both finished with 4–2–4 records. The two teams tied their regular season meeting 2–2. The second tiebreaker was points against common opponents. Vanderbilt earned 15 points while Auburn 12, so Vanderbilt was the fifth seed and Auburn was the sixth. A second tiebreaker was required for the eighth and ninth seeds as Georgia and Kentucky finished tied with 3–3–4 regular season records. The two teams tied their regular season match-up 1–1. In the points against common opponents tiebreaker, Georgia prevailed 12 points to 9 points, and was therefore the seventh seed. A three-way tiebreaker was required for the tenth, eleventh, and twelfth seeds as Alabama, LSU and Texas A&M all earned eleven conference regular season points. Since all three teams did not play in the regular season, the tiebreaker was determined by points versus common opponents. Texas A&M earned six points and was the tenth seed. LSU earned four points and was the eleventh seed. Alabama earned three points and was the twelfth and final seed.

Seed	School	Conference Record	Conference Points
1	Mississippi State	10–0–0	30
2	Arkansas	8–1–1	25
3	Texas	6–3–1	19
4	South Carolina	5–2–3	18
5	Vanderbilt	4–2–4	13
6	Auburn	4–2–4	13
7	Georgia	3–3–4	13
8	Kentucky	3–3–4	13
9	Tennessee	3–4–3	12
10	Texas A&M	3–5–2	11
11	LSU	3–5–2	11
12	Alabama	2–3–5	11

== Bracket ==
First Round; Sunday, Nov. 3
7	Georgia	1
10	Texas A&M	0
6	Auburn	1
11	LSU	2
8	Kentucky	0
9	Tennessee	1
5	Vanderbilt	1
12	Alabama	2

Quarterfinals; Tuesday, Nov. 5
2	Arkansas	1
7	Georgia	0
3	Texas	3
11	LSU	0
1	Mississippi State (a.e.t.)	2
9	Tennessee	1
4	South Carolina	4
12	Alabama	1

Semifinals; Thursday, Nov. 7
2	Arkansas	1
3	Texas (a.e.t.)	2
1	Mississippi State	0
4	South Carolina	3

Final; Sunday, Nov. 10
3	Texas	1
4	South Carolina	0

== Matches ==
=== First round ===
November 3, 2024 Match 1	#7 Georgia	1–0	#10 Texas A&M	Pensacola, FL
11:30 a.m. CST	Dasia Torbert 19'; Tyler Kaseta (yellow card) 42'	Report		Stadium: Ashton Brosnaham Soccer Complex; Referee: Dorian Del Toro Urueta; Assistant referees: Kendall McCardell; Craig Lowery; Fourth official: Aaron Hernandez

November 3, 2024 Match 2	#6 Auburn	1–2	#11 LSU	Pensacola, FL
1:00 p.m. CST	Mallory Mooney 78'	Report	57' Gabbi Ceballos; (yellow card) 70' Sophine Kevorkian; 71' Mollie Baker; (yellow card) 77' Sydney Cheeseman; (yellow card) 78' Sage Glover	Stadium: Ashton Brosnaham Soccer Complex; Attendance: 1,277; Referee: Samantha Martinez; Assistant referees: Chana Forstall; John Villalobos; Fourth official: Velimir Stefanovic

November 3, 2024 Match 3	#8 Kentucky	0–1	#9 Tennessee	Pensacola, FL
4:30 p.m. CST	Cayden Norris (yellow card) 74'; Reese Mattern (yellow card) 78'	Report	15' Sammi Woods	Stadium: Ashton Brosnaham Soccer Complex; Referee: Jonathan Weiner; Assistant referees: Craig Lowery; Kendall McCardell; Fourth official: Amel Selman

November 3, 2024 Match 4	#5 Vanderbilt	1–2	#12 Alabama	Pensacola, FL
7:00 p.m. CST	Sydney Watts (yellow card) 57'; Ella Eggleston 77'	Report	9' Nadia Ramadan; 18' Zivana Labovic; (yellow card) 27' Gessica Skorka; (yellow card) 55' Zivana Labovic	Stadium: Ashton Brosnaham Soccer Complex; Attendance: 1,020; Referee: Velimir Stefanovic; Assistant referees: John Villalobos; Chana Forstall; Fourth official: Samantha Martinez

=== Quarterfinals ===
November 5, 2024 Match 5	#2 Arkansas	1–0	#7 Georgia	Pensacola, FL
11:30 a.m. CST	Jailyn Brownlee (yellow card) 62'; Team (yellow card) 75'; Anaiyah Robinson 82'	Report	(yellow card) 87' Dasia Torbert	Stadium: Ashton Brosnaham Soccer Complex; Referee: Richonne Clark; Assistant referees: Katarzyna Wasiak; Craig Lowery; Fourth official: Samantha Martinez

November 5, 2024 Match 6	#3 Texas	3–0	#11 LSU	Pensacola, FL
1:00 p.m. CST	Amalia Villarreal 55'; Holly Ward 57', 86'; Lexi Missimo (yellow card) 58'	Report		Stadium: Ashton Brosnaham Soccer Complex; Attendance: 817; Referee: Aaron Hernadez; Assistant referees: Chana Forstall; Sam Bilbo; Fourth official: Corey Rockwell

November 5, 2024 Match 7	#1 Mississippi State	2–1 (a.e.t.)	#9 Tennessee	Pensacola, FL
4:30 p.m. CST	Hannah Johnson 43'; Aitana Martinez-Montoya 101'	Report	75' Mississippi State Own Goal	Stadium: Ashton Brosnaham Soccer Complex; Referee: Arnel Selman; Assistant referees: Craig Lowery; Kendall McCardell; Fourth official: Jonathan Weiner

November 5, 2024 Match 8	#4 South Carolina	4–1	#12 Alabama	Pensacola, FL
7:00 p.m. CST	Amanda Patrick 11'; Catherine Barry 33', 84'; Autumn Cayelli 75'; Katie Shea Collins (yellow card) 82'	Report	(yellow card) 13' Gianna Paul; (yellow card) 74' Kennedy Garcia; 85' Nadia Ramadan	Stadium: Ashton Brosnaham Soccer Complex; Attendance: 1,119; Referee: Corey Rockwell; Assistant referees: Sam Bilbo; John Villalobos; Fourth official: Dorian Del Toro Ureuta

=== Semifinals ===
November 7, 2024 Match 9	#1 Mississippi State	0–3	#4 South Carolina	Pensacola, FL
4:30 p.m. CST		Report	48', 49', (yellow card) 60' Brianna Behm; 81' Catherine Barry	Stadium: Ashton Brosnaham Soccer Complex; Referee: Jonathan Weiner; Assistant referees: Sam Bilbo; Chana Forstall; Fourth official: Dorian Del Toro Ureuta

November 7, 2024 Match 10	#2 Arkansas	1–2 (a.e.t.)	#3 Texas	Pensacola, FL
7:00 p.m. CST	Kennedy Ball 17'; Anaiyah Robinson (yellow card) 82'; Ava Tankersley (yellow card) 98'	Report	(yellow card) 20', 109' Lauren Lapomarda; 40' Arkansas Own Goal; (yellow card) 86' Mia Justus	Stadium: Ashton Brosnaham Soccer Complex; Attendance: 1,342; Referee: Corey Rockwell; Assistant referees: Katarzyna Wasiak; Craig Lowery; Fourth official: Dorian Del Toro Ureuta

=== Final ===
November 10, 2024 Match 11	#3 Texas	1–0	#4 South Carolina	Pensacola, FL
1:30 p.m. CST	Carly Montgomery 80'	Report	(yellow card) 6' Corinna Zullo	Stadium: Ashton Brosnaham Soccer Complex; Attendance: 2,110; Referee: Samantha Martinez; Assistant referees: Katarzyna Wasiak; Chana Forstall; Fourth official: Dorian Del Toro Urueta

== Statistics ==
=== Goalscorers ===
There were 27 goals scored in 11 matches, for an average of 2.45 goals per match (as of November 10, 2024).

3 goals

- Catherine Barry – South Carolina

2 goals

- Brianna Behm – South Carolina
- Nadia Ramadan – Alabama
- Holly Ward – Texas

1 goal

- Mollie Baker – LSU
- Kennedy Ball – Arkansas
- Autumn Cayelli – South Carolina
- Gabbi Ceballos – LSU
- Ella Eggleston – Vanderbilt
- Hannah Johnson – Mississippi State
- Zivana Labovic – Alabama
- Lauren Lapomarda – Texas
- Aitana Martinez-Montoya – Mississippi State
- Carly Montgomery – Texas
- Mallory Mooney – Auburn
- Amanda Patrick – South Carolina
- Anaiyah Robinson – Arkansas
- Dasia Torbert – Georgia
- Sammi Woods – Tennessee
- Amalia Villarreal – Texas

1 own goal

- Arkansas (vs. Texas)
- Mississippi State (vs Tennessee)

== All-Tournament team ==
Player	Team
Ava Tankersley	Arkansas
Avery Wren	Arkansas
Maddy Anderson	Mississippi State
Hannah Johnson	Mississippi State
Catherine Barry	South Carolina
Brianna Behm	South Carolina
Hallie Meadows	South Carolina
**Mia Justus**	Texas
Lexi Missimo	Texas
Breanna Thompson	Texas
Holly Ward	Texas

MVP in bold
