= University of Kentucky Soccer Complex =

Soccer stadium in Lexington, Kentucky

Coordinates: 38.017848°N 84.501278°W

The University of Kentucky Soccer Complex (or UK Soccer Complex) is a soccer-specific stadium in Lexington, Kentucky on the campus of the University of Kentucky.

The stadium, which opened in 1996, is home to Kentucky Wildcats soccer, both men's (Sun Belt Conference) and women's (Southeastern Conference). It usually seats 1,500 but can seat 3,000. The stadium served as host of the 1996 SEC Women's Soccer Tournament. The University of Kentucky has recently changed the name of their soccer complex to the Wendell and Vickie Bell Soccer Complex in the year of 2014. Its capacity can now hold up to 3,370 people. Combined with the 2011 additions of a $600,000 playing surface, a new video tower and a video board, it sets the standard for college soccer facilities.

The University of Kentucky athletics opened the soccer stadium up for all soccer athletes and supporters in the year of 1996. The soccer complex, along with the baseball and softball complexes, received the name of Barnhart Family Athletic Complex after the recent athletic directors, Mitch and Connie Barnhart.
