= SEC women's soccer tournament =

- Conference soccer championship
- Sport: Soccer
- Conference: Southeastern Conference
- Number of teams: 12
- Format: Single-elimination
- Current stadium: Ashton Brosnaham Complex
- Current location: Pensacola, Florida
- Played: 1993–present
- Last contest: 2026
- Current champion: South Carolina (4th title)
- Most championships: Florida (12 titles)
- TV partner: SEC Network
- Official website: secports.com/soccer

The SEC women's soccer tournament is the conference championship tournament in college soccer for the Southeastern Conference (SEC). The tournament has been held every year since 1993. It is a single-elimination tournament with seeding based on conference records and the regular-season champion hosting the semifinal and final matches. The field expanded from four to six teams in its second season, 1994, and then to eight teams in 1996. The tournament expanded again to 10 teams in 2012 and then further to 12 teams after the SEC expanded in 2024. The winner is declared conference champion and receives the conference's automatic bid to the NCAA Division I women's soccer championship.

== Champions ==
=== Key ===
Key

- (1) — Title number
- a.e.t. — Match went to extra time
- p – Match decided by a penalty shootout after extra time
- – Winning team also won regular season

=== By Year ===
Year	Champion	Score	Runner-up	Venue / city	MVP	Ref.
1993	Vanderbilt (1)	3–2 (a.e.t.)	Arkansas	Purdy Field • Nashville, TN	Honey Marsh, Arkansas	
1994	Vanderbilt (2)	3–0	Auburn	LadyBack Field • Fayetteville, AR	Christine Watson, Vanderbilt	
1995	Kentucky (1)	2–1	Alabama	Auburn Soccer Complex • Auburn, AL	Carrie Landrum, Kentucky	
1996	Florida (1)	3–2 (a.e.t.)	Arkansas	UK Soccer Complex • Lexington, KY	Danielle Fotopoulos, Florida	
1997	Florida (2)	4–2	Vanderbilt	James Pressly Stadium • Gainesville, FL	Sarah Yohe, Florida	
1998	Florida (3)	2–0	Vanderbilt	Alabama Soccer Field • Tuscaloosa, AL	Erin Baxter, Florida	
1999	Florida (4)	3–0	Ole Miss	Vanderbilt Soccer Field • Nashville, TN	Angie Olson, Florida	
2000	Florida (5)	2–0	Georgia	Georgia Soccer Stadium • Athens, GA	Abby Wambach, Florida	
2001	Florida (6)	2–1	Auburn	LSU Soccer Complex • Baton Rouge, LA	Abby Wambach, Florida	
2002	Tennessee (1)	2–1 (a.e.t.)	Florida	Ole Miss Soccer Stadium • Oxford, MS	Jordan Kellgren, Florida	
2003	Tennessee (2)	1–1 (7–6 p)	Florida	Orange Beach Sportsplex • Orange Beach, AL	Robin Fulton, Florida	
2004	Florida (7)	2–1 (a.e.t.)	Tennessee	Auburn Soccer Complex • Auburn, AL	Stephanie Freeman, Florida	
2005	Tennessee (3)	1–0	Auburn	Orange Beach Sportsplex, Orange Beach, AL	Ronda Brooks, Auburn	
2006	Kentucky (2)	2–1	Florida	Orange Beach Sportsplex, Orange Beach, AL	Anne Ogundele, Kentucky	
2007	Florida (8)	4–1	Georgia	Orange Beach Sportsplex, Orange Beach, AL	Stacy Bishop, Florida	
2008	Tennessee (4)	1–0	Georgia	Orange Beach Sportsplex, Orange Beach, AL	Jaimel Johnson, Tennessee	
2009	South Carolina (1)	1–1 (8–7 p)	LSU	Orange Beach Sportsplex, Orange Beach, AL	Blakely Mattern, South Carolina	
2010	Florida (9)	1–0	South Carolina	Orange Beach Sportsplex, Orange Beach, AL	Erika Tymrak, Florida	
2011	Auburn (1)	3–2	Florida	Orange Beach Sportsplex, Orange Beach, AL	Katy Frierson, Auburn	
2012	Florida (10)	3–0	Auburn	Orange Beach Sportsplex, Orange Beach, AL	Erika Tymrak, Florida	
2013	Texas A&M (1)	2–1	Florida	Orange Beach Sportsplex, Orange Beach, AL	Liz Keester, Texas A&M	
2014	Texas A&M (2)	1–0	Kentucky	Orange Beach Sportsplex, Orange Beach, AL	Bianca Brinson, Texas A&M	
2015	Florida (11)	2–1	Texas A&M	Orange Beach Sportsplex, Orange Beach, AL	Christen Westphal, Florida	
2016	Florida (12)	2–1 (a.e.t.)	Arkansas	Orange Beach Sportsplex, Orange Beach, AL	Meggie Dougherty Howard, Florida	
2017	Texas A&M (3)	2–1	Arkansas	Orange Beach Sportsplex, Orange Beach, AL	Mikaela Harvey, Texas A&M	
2018	LSU (1)	1–1 (4–1 p)	Arkansas	Orange Beach Sportsplex, Orange Beach, AL	Caroline Brockmeier, LSU	
2019	South Carolina (2)	1–0	Arkansas	Orange Beach Sportsplex, Orange Beach, AL	Grace Fisk, South Carolina	
2020	Vanderbilt (3)	3–1	Arkansas	Orange Beach Sportsplex, Orange Beach, AL	Myra Konte, Vanderbilt	
2021	Tennessee (5)	3–0	Arkansas	Orange Beach Sportsplex, Orange Beach, AL	Abbey Burdette, Tennessee	
2022	South Carolina (3)	1–0	Alabama	Ashton Brosnaham Complex, Pensacola, FL	Catherine Barry, South Carolina	
2023	Georgia (1)	1–0	Arkansas	Ashton Brosnaham Complex, Pensacola, FL	Croix Bethune, Georgia	
2024	Texas (1)	1–0	South Carolina	Ashton Brosnaham Complex, Pensacola, FL	Mia Justus, Texas	
2025	Vanderbilt (4)	1–1 (8–7 p)	LSU	Ashton Brosnaham Complex, Pensacola, FL	Courtney Jones, Vanderbilt	
2026	South Carolina (4)	4–1	Texas	Ashton Brosnaham Complex, Pensacola, FL	Reagan Schubach, South Carolina	

=== By school ===
As of Dec 2026

School	Apps.	W	L	T	Pct.	Finals	Titles	Winning years
Alabama	18	8	17	1	.327	2	0	—
Arkansas	19	20	16	6	.548	8	0	—
Auburn	30	16	26	5	.394	5	1	2011
Florida	27	51	13	6	.771	17	12	1996–2001, 2004, 2007, 2010, 2012, 2015, 2016
Georgia	24	16	21	4	.439	4	1	2023
Kentucky	25	14	20	4	.421	3	2	1995, 2006
LSU	21	13	14	9	.486	2	1	2018
Mississippi State	8	2	7	2	.273	0	0	—
Missouri	8	3	7	1	.318	0	0	—
Oklahoma	1	0	1	0	.000	0	0	—
Ole Miss	23	8	23	1	.266	1	0	—
South Carolina	24	19	19	6	.500	6	4	2009, 2019, 2022, 2026
Tennessee	25	19	18	6	.512	6	5	2002, 2003, 2005, 2008, 2021
Texas	2	5	1	1	.786	2	1	2024
Texas A&M	12	15	9	0	.625	4	3	2013, 2014, 2017
Vanderbilt	26	18	17	6	.512	6	4	1993, 1994, 2020, 2025
