= Keidane McAlpine =

American college soccer coach (born 1975)

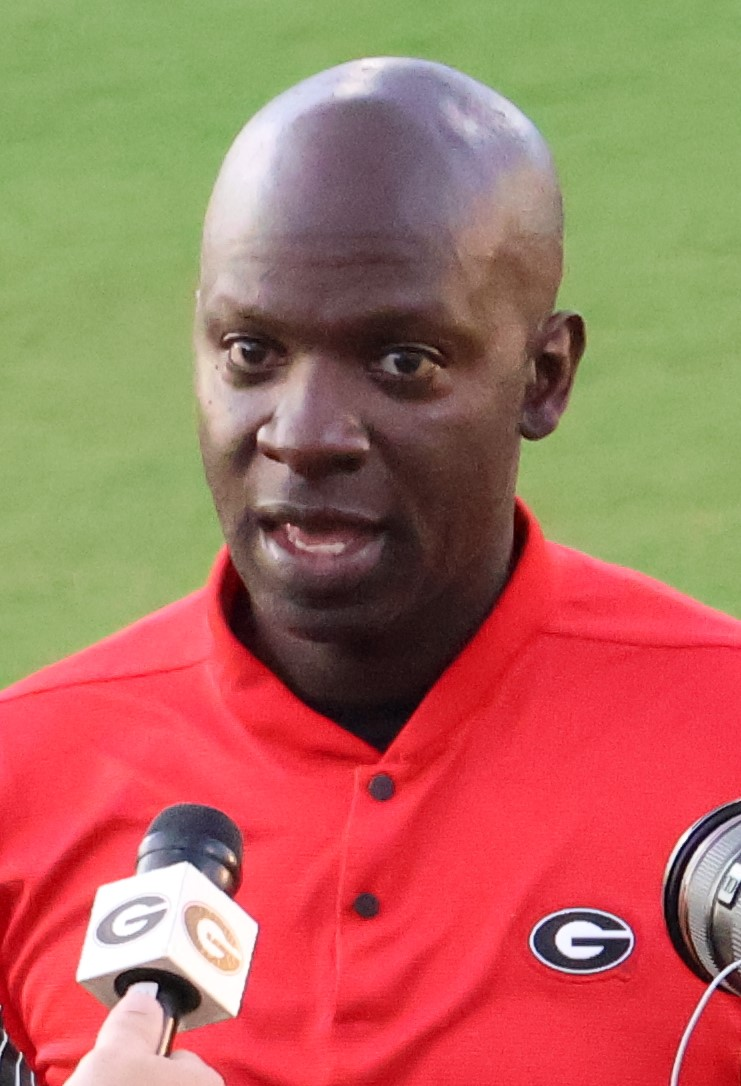
- McAlpine with Georgia in 2024

Personal information
- Full name: Keidane McAlpine
- Date of birth: January 12, 1975 (age 51)
- Place of birth: Huntsville, Alabama, U.S.

Team information
- Current team: Georgia (coach)

College career
Years	Team	Apps	(Gls)
1993–1996	Birmingham–Southern		

Senior career*
Years	Team	Apps	(Gls)
1999	Tennessee Rhythm		

Managerial career
- 2001–2005: Birmingham–Southern
- 2006–2011: Auburn (assistant)
- 2012–2013: Washington State
- 2014–2021: USC
- 2022–: Georgia
- * Club domestic league appearances and goals

Keidane McAlpine (born January 12, 1975) is an American college soccer coach and the current head coach of the Georgia Bulldogs women's soccer team. McAlpine was the previous head coach of USC Trojans women's soccer team who he led to a National Championship in 2016.

== Coaching career ==
In July 2006, McAlpine was hired as an assistant coach at Auburn University. Later, in January 2012, he was hired to be the head coach at Washington State. He was then hired to be the head coach at USC in December 2013. In July 2016, McAlpine signed a contract extension at USC. McAlpine led the Trojans to a national championship in 2016.

In November 2021, McAlpine was hired as coach at Georgia.

== College head coaching record ==
Record table
Season	Team	Overall	Conference	Standing	Postseason
Birmingham–Southern Panthers () (2001–2005)
2001	Birmingham–Southern	8–6–3			
2002	Birmingham–Southern	5–11–2			
2003	Birmingham–Southern	7–12–2	2-3-2		
2004	Birmingham–Southern	12–8–3	6-2-1		NCAA first round
2005	Birmingham–Southern	8–11–1	4-4-0		
Birmingham–Southern:		40–48–11 (.460)			
Washington State Cougars (Pac-12) (2012–2013)
2012	Washington State	12–6–2	6–4–1	4th	NCAA first round
2013	Washington State	14–3–4	7–3–1	2nd	NCAA first round
Washington State:		26–9–6 (.707)			
USC Trojans (Pac-12) (2014–2021)
2014	USC	12–6–3	6–5–0	4th	NCAA first round
2015	USC	15–6–2	9–2–0	2nd	NCAA Round of 16
2016	USC	19–4–2	8–2–1	2nd	NCAA Champions
2017	USC	15–3–2	8–2–1	T–2nd	NCAA second round
2018	USC	17–2–3	8–2–1	3rd	NCAA Round of 16
2019	USC	17–5–1	7–4–0	T–3rd	NCAA Quarterfinals
2020	USC	7–3–4	6–3–2	2nd	NCAA second round
2021	USC	14–3–3	8–1–2	2nd	NCAA second round
USC:		116–32–20 (.727)			
Total:		182–89–37 (.651)			
National champion Postseason invitational champion Conference regular season champion Conference regular season and conference tournament champion Division regular season champion Division regular season and conference tournament champion Conference tournament champion
