= Arkansas Razorbacks women's soccer =

American college soccer team

- 2025 Arkansas Razorbacks women's soccer team
- Founded: 1986; 40 years ago
- University: University of Arkansas
- Head coach: Colby Hale (15th season)
- Conference: SEC
- Location: Fayetteville, Arkansas, US
- Stadium: Razorback Field (capacity: 1,500)
- Nickname: Razorbacks
- Colors: Cardinal and white

NCAA tournament Quarterfinals
- 2021, 2022

NCAA tournament Round of 16
- 2013, 2020, 2021, 2022, 2024

NCAA tournament Round of 32
- 2013, 2014, 2016, 2018, 2019, 2020, 2021, 2022, 2023, 2024

NCAA tournament appearances
- 2013, 2014, 2016, 2017, 2018, 2019, 2020, 2021, 2022, 2023, 2024, 2025

Conference regular season championships
- 2019, 2020, 2021, 2023, 2025

The Arkansas Razorbacks women's soccer team is who represents the University of Arkansas currently in the Southeastern Conference of NCAA Division I soccer. The program was founded in 1986, and is currently led by Colby Hale, for now his fifteenth season. Under Hale's direction, the team has made it to the NCAA Tournament ten times in his twelve seasons (Arkansas' first ever appearances in the tournament), and has won the SEC regular season championship five times, to include 2025.

== Current squad ==
As of November 2026

Note: Flags indicate national team as defined under FIFA eligibility rules; some limited exceptions apply. Players may hold more than one non-FIFA nationality.

No.	Pos.	Nation	Player
0	GK	USA	Julia Ivanova
1	GK	USA	Emily Jenkins
2	GK	USA	Keegan Smith
3	DF	USA	Nuria Craig
4	DF	USA	Presley Marvil
5	FW	USA	Bella Field
6	DF	USA	Cora Hair
7	MF	USA	Ivy Harding
8	DF	USA	Kate Carter
9	DF	USA	Londyn Green
11	MF	CAN	Aniyah Nurse-Whyte
12	FW	USA	Vailana Tu’ua
13	FW	USA	Aynsley Nuckols
14	DF	USA	Makenzie Malham

No.	Pos.	Nation	Player
15	FW	USA	Sabrina Jones
16	DF	USA	Jordan Bryant
17	MF	USA	Kennedy Ball
18	DF	USA	Avery Wren
19	FW	USA	Paige Szymanski
20	FW	USA	Natalie Wagner
21	FW	USA	Molly Teed
23	FW	USA	MacKenzie Gwin
24	DF	USA	Kayla Morawietz
27	DF	JAM	Dejionee Anderson
28	FW	USA	Kyndal Ewertz
33	DF	USA	Madden McDonald
35	FW	USA	Lauren Van Rhein
99	FW	USA	Zoe Susi

== Seasons ==
Year	Head Coach	Overall	Conf.	Conf. Tournament	NCAA Tournament
1986	Curtis Sergeant	3–9–0	–	–	–
1987	Curtis Sergeant	10–8–0	–	–	–
1988	Kathy Ludwig	3–10–2	–	–	–
1989	Kathy Ludwig	7–7–2	–	–	–
1990	Marcia McDermott	7–7–1	–	–	–
1991	Marcia McDermott	11–8–0	–	–	–
1992	Marcia McDermott	8–8–1	–	–	–
1993	Janet Rayfield	10–10–0	–	–	–
1994	Janet Rayfield	7–11–2	0–3–1	1–1	–
1995	Janet Rayfield	5–13–1	3–5–0	–	–
1996	Janet Rayfield	11–7–3	4–3–1	2–1	–
1997	Janet Rayfield	6–12–1	2–6–0	0–1	–
1998	Janet Rayfield	6–11–0	2–6–0	–	–
1999	Alan Kirkup	7–12–0	4–5–0	0–1	–
2000	Alan Kirkup	7–11–3	3–5–1	0–1	–
2001	Alan Kirkup	6–14–0	2–7–0	–	–
2002	Alan Kirkup	7–11–2	3–5–1	–	–
2003	Alan Kirkup	7–11–1	3–6–0	–	–
2004	Gordon Henderson	6–11–2	2–7–2	–	–
2005	Gordon Henderson	6–12–0	3–8–0	–	–
2006	Gordon Henderson	10–7–2	3–6–2	–	–
2007	Gordon Henderson	8–11–1	1–9–1	–	–
2008	Gordon Henderson	11–8–0	4–7–0	–	–
2009	Erin Aubry	8–7–4	2–7–2	–	–
2010	Erin Aubry	5–11–3	2–7–2	–	–
2011	Erin Aubry	4–14–0	2–9–0	–	–
2012	Colby Hale	9–10–1	6–6–1	0–1	–
2013	Colby Hale	15–8–1	5–6–0	1–1	2–1
2014	Colby Hale	9–7–6	4–4–3	0–1	1–1
2015	Colby Hale	6–11–1	2–8–1	–	–
2016	Colby Hale	18–5–1	8–3–0	2–1	1–1
2017	Colby Hale	11–11–2	6–6–2	2–1–1	0–1
2018	Colby Hale	14–6–3	6–3–1	2–0–1	1–1
2019	Colby Hale	17–4–2	8–1–1	2–1	1–1
2020	Colby Hale	12–4–0	7–1–0	2–1	1–1
2021	Colby Hale	19–4–1	9–1–0	2–1	3–0–1
2022	Colby Hale	13–4–5	6–2–2	0–0–1	2–1–1
2023	Colby Hale	11–3–2	7–1–1	2-1	1-1
2024	Colby Hale	16–2–3	8–1–1	1-1	2-0-1
2025	Colby Hale	9–4–4	7–1–2	0-1	

Legend: Conference regular season champions NCAA tournament appearances
