= South Carolina Gamecocks women's soccer =

Women's soccer team of the University of South Carolina

South Carolina Gamecocks
- Founded: 1995; 31 years ago
- University: University of South Carolina
- Head coach: Shelley Smith (26th season)
- Conference: SEC
- Location: Columbia, South Carolina, US
- Stadium: Eugene E. Stone III Stadium (capacity: 5,700)
- Nickname: Gamecocks
- Colors: Garnet and black
Home	Away

NCAA tournament College Cup
- 2017

NCAA tournament Quarterfinals
- 2014, 2016, 2017, 2019, 2021

NCAA tournament Round of 16
- 2009, 2014, 2016, 2017, 2019, 2021, 2022

NCAA tournament Round of 32
- 2009, 2010, 2011, 2013, 2014, 2016, 2017, 2018, 2019, 2020, 2021, 2022, 2023, 2024

NCAA tournament appearances
- 1998, 2007, 2008, 2009, 2010, 2011, 2013, 2014, 2015, 2016, 2017, 2018, 2019, 2020, 2021, 2022, 2023, 2024, 2025, 2026

Conference tournament championships
- 2009, 2019, 2022, 2026

Conference regular season championships
- 2011, 2016, 2017

The South Carolina Gamecocks women's soccer team represents the University of South Carolina in soccer and competes in the Southeastern Conference. The team was formed in 1995 and plays its home games at Stone Stadium.

Shelley Smith is the current head coach of the women's soccer team, with her husband, Jamie, serving as associate head coach. The Gamecocks have played in 20 NCAA Tournaments, posting 14 Round of 32 appearances, 7 Round of 16 appearances, five Quarterfinal appearances, and a College Cup berth in 2017.

== Current squad ==
As of November 2026

Note: Flags indicate national team as defined under FIFA eligibility rules; some limited exceptions apply. Players may hold more than one non-FIFA nationality.

No.	Pos.	Nation	Player
1	GK	USA	Emma Kirlin
2	MF	USA	Maggie Taitano
3	DF	USA	Sophie Johnson
4	FW	USA	Maryn Wolf
5	DF	USA	Dempsey McMahon
6	DF	USA	Amanda Patrick
7	FW	USA	Ava Tutas
8	FW	USA	Mackenzie Johnson
9	DF	USA	Reagan Schubach
10	MF	USA	Helen Ghertner
11	MF	USA	Kinley Brown
12	MF	USA	Reese Slater
13	MF	USA	Katie Russo
14	DF	USA	Taylor Bloom
15	DF	USA	Ashley Connolly

No.	Pos.	Nation	Player
16	FW	USA	Autumn Cayelli
17	FW	USA	Wynn Generally
18	DF	USA	Harper Donovan
19	DF	ENG	Emily Walne
21	MF	USA	Avery Galante
22	FW	USA	Sydney Middaugh
24	MF	USA	Laney Keith
25	DF	USA	Micah Bryant
28	FW	ENG	Emilie Castagna
30	DF	USA	Jyvanna Harris
32	MF	USA	Cuyler Zulauf
44	GK	USA	Maria Kemp
71	GK	USA	Christina Tsaousis
99	FW	USA	Dubem Dike

== Head coaches ==
=== Coaches history ===
Statistics correct as of the end of the 2025 NCAA Division I women's soccer season

Name	Years	Seasons	Won	Lost	Tie	Pct.
Sue Kelly	1995–2000	6	55	57	5	.491
Shelley Smith	2001–present	26	342	148	80	.670
All-Time		32	397	205	85	.640

== Year-by-Year Results ==
Statistics correct as of the end of the 2025 NCAA Division I women's soccer season

List of South Carolina Gamecocks women's soccer seasons
Season	Head coach	Regular season					Postseason	
Season	Head coach	Overall	Conference				Conference	NCAA
Season	Head coach	Overall	Conference	Division	Finish	Results	Conference	NCAA
1995	Sue Kelly	8–10–2	SEC	Eastern	5th	0–7–1	—	—
1996	Sue Kelly	10–7–2	SEC	Eastern	6th	2–5–1	—	—
1997	Sue Kelly	8–11–0	SEC	Eastern	T–5th	2–6–0	—	—
1998	Sue Kelly	11–7–1	SEC	Eastern	T–5th	4–4–0	—	First Round
1999	Sue Kelly	14–6–0	SEC	Eastern	T–3rd	6–3–0	Quarterfinals	—
2000	Sue Kelly	4–16–0	SEC	Eastern	6th	1–8–0	—	—
2001	Shelley Smith	8–7–3	SEC	Eastern	6th	2–6–1	—	—
2002	Shelley Smith	13–6–2	SEC	Eastern	3rd	4–3–2	Quarterfinals	—
2003	Shelley Smith	10–8–3	SEC	Eastern	T–5th	3–4–2	Quarterfinals	—
2004	Shelley Smith	8–10–2	SEC	Eastern	6th	2–7–2	—	—
2005	Shelley Smith	6–12–0	SEC	Eastern	6th	2–9–0	—	—
2006	Shelley Smith	11–6–5	SEC	Eastern	5th	5–2–4	Semifinals	—
2007	Shelley Smith	14–6–3	SEC	Eastern	4th	5–4–2	Semifinals	First Round
2008	Shelley Smith	11–7–4	SEC	Eastern	3rd	5–4–2	Quarterfinals	First Round
2009	Shelley Smith	19–4–2	SEC^{†}	Eastern	2nd	7–3–1	Champions	Round of 16
2010	Shelley Smith	17–6–2	SEC	Eastern	2nd	8–2–1	Finals	Round of 32
2011	Shelley Smith	16–7–0	SEC	Eastern^{‡}	1st	9–2–0	Quarterfinals	Round of 32
2012	Shelley Smith	7–10–4	SEC	Eastern	5th	3–7–3	Second Round	—
2013	Shelley Smith	17–4–2	SEC	—	3rd	8–2–1	Semifinals	Round of 32
2014	Shelley Smith	14–6–5	SEC	—	5th	5–3–3	Semifinals	Quarterfinals
2015	Shelley Smith	12–5–3	SEC	—	5th	6–3–2	Quarterfinals	First Round
2016	Shelley Smith	21–2–1	SEC	—	1st	11–0–0	Semifinals	Quarterfinals
2017	Shelley Smith	19–3–1	SEC	—	1st	9–0–1	Quarterfinals	College Cup
2018	Shelley Smith	14–6–1	SEC	—	T–3rd	6–3–1	Semifinals	Round of 32
2019	Shelley Smith	19–2–3	SEC^{†}	—	1st	7–0–3	Champions	Quarterfinals
2020	Shelley Smith	11–5–0	SEC	–	3rd	6–2–0	N/A	Round of 32
2021	Shelley Smith	14–7–1	SEC	–	4th	6–3–1	Quarterfinals	Quarterfinals
2022	Shelley Smith	15–4–5	SEC	–	2nd	6–3–1	Champions	Round of 16
2023	Shelley Smith	12–3–6	SEC	–	3rd	5–0–5	Quarterfinals	Round of 32
2024	Shelley Smith	11–4–7	SEC	–	4th	5–2–3	Finals	Round of 32
2025	Shelley Smith	10-5-5	SEC	–	7th	4-2-4	First Round	First Round
2026	Shelley Smith	15-2-3	SEC	–	2nd	6-1-3	Champions	
Total	South Carolina	397-147-80	SEC	–	3 SEC CHAMPIONS	156-110-49	4 SEC CHAMPIONS	19 NCAA Division I women's soccer tournament appearances

|}

== Attendance ==
Over the past few seasons, the South Carolina Gamecocks have become one of the national leaders in attendance for Women's Soccer. Since 2014 the program ranks in the top three nationally in total and average attendance.

The current attendance record of 6,354 was set on August 24 in a 1–0 victory over Clemson.

Year	Games	Overall W–L	Overall Win Pct	NCAA W–L	NCAA Win Pct	Total Attendance (SEC/Nat Rank)	Avg Attendance (SEC/Nat Rank)
2013	11	11–0	1.000	1–0	1.000	14,997 (4th/12th)	1,363 (4th/10th)
2014	12	8–3–1	.708	1–0	1.000	32,197 (2nd/2nd)	2,683 (2nd/3rd)
2015	11	9–2–0	.818	0–1	0.000	29,206 (2nd/3rd)	2,655 (2nd/3rd)
2016	14	13–1–0	.929	3–1	.750	38,209 (1st/1st)	2,729 (2nd/3rd)
2017	12	11–0–1	.958	4–0	1.000	24,773 (2nd/4th)	2,064 (2nd/4th)
Totals	60	52–6–2	.883	9–2	.818	139,382	2,323
