= 2020 NCAA Division I women's soccer tournament =

2020 NCAA women's soccer tournament
Women's College Cup (Semifinals & Final)

Tournament details
- Country: United States
- Dates: April 27 – May 17, 2021
- Teams: 48

Final positions
- Champions: (11) Santa Clara (2nd title)
- Runners-up: (1) Florida State
- Semifinalists: (2) North Carolina; Virginia

Tournament statistics
- Matches played: 47
- Goals scored: 122 (2.6 per match)
- Top goal scorer(s): Gabriella Coleman – Oklahoma State; Alexa Spaanstra – Virginia (4 goals each)

The 2020 NCAA Division I women's soccer tournament (also known as the 2020 Women's College Cup) was the 39th annual single-elimination tournament to determine the national champion of NCAA Division I women's collegiate soccer. The Santa Clara Broncos defeated the Florida State Seminoles in a penalty shoot-out to win the national championship.

== Effects of the COVID-19 pandemic ==
As a result of the COVID-19 pandemic, the NCAA postponed the fall championships, hoping to play them in the spring. In September, the NCAA approved a plan to hold fall championships in the spring.

Instead of the usual 64-team tournament, the field is reduced to 48 teams for the 2020 tournament.

Rather than the higher seed hosting the early-round matches, the entire tournament will be played in the state of North Carolina, similar to how the 2021 men's and women's basketball tournaments were held in a single state.

== Venues ==
Cary	Buies Creek	Greenville	Wilmington
WakeMed Soccer Park	Eakes Athletics Complex	Johnson Stadium	UNCW Soccer Stadium
Capacity: 10,000	Capacity: 586	Capacity: 1,000	Capacity: 3,000
Wilson	Greensboro	Matthews	
J. Burt Gillette Athletic Complex	Bryan Park	Matthews Sportsplex	
Capacity: 500	Capacity: 3,000	Capacity: 2,300	

== Qualified teams ==
48 teams qualified for the Division I women's soccer tournament. There were 29 conference champions after the Big West Conference and Ivy League chose not to have a 2020 fall or 2021 spring season. The other 19 were at-large selections.

Automatic bids
Conference	Team	Record	Appearance	Last bid
ACC	Florida State	11–0–0	21	2019
America East	Stony Brook	6–3–0	4	2019
American	South Florida	9–0–2	7	2019
ASUN	Liberty	7–5–5	7	2016
Atlantic 10	Saint Louis	15–1–0	5	2019
Big 12	TCU	11–1–1	5	2019
Big East	Georgetown	11–0–1	11	2019
Big Sky	Montana	9–1–0	5	2018
Big South	Campbell	8–3–1	2	2004
Big Ten	Iowa	6–8–1	3	2019
Big West	Big West Conference season canceled			
Colonial	Elon	6–3–0	2	1999
C-USA	Rice	12–2–1	5	2017
Horizon	Milwaukee	8–1–1	14	2019
Ivy	Ivy League season canceled			
MAAC	Siena	6–0–2	3	2015
MAC	Bowling Green	6–1–0	5	2019
Missouri Valley	Loyola-Chicago	8–1–1	6	2019
Mountain West	New Mexico	10–1–0	3	2011
Northeast	Central Connecticut	7–0–0	10	2019
Ohio Valley	SIU Edwardsville	8–2–2	3	2016
Pac-12	UCLA	12–1–2	24	2019
Patriot	Navy	4–4–2	5	2019
SEC	Vanderbilt	9–5–1	11	2019
Southern	Furman	8–0–2	8	2015
Southland	Southeastern Louisiana	8–2–4	4	2015
SWAC	Alabama State	8–2–2	3	2017
Summit	Denver	16–2–1	12	2018
Sun Belt	South Alabama	13–8–1	7	2019
West Coast	Santa Clara	7–1–0	30	2019
WAC	Utah Valley	12–4–4	3	2017

At-Large Bids
Conference	Team	Record	Appearance	Last bid
Pac-12	Arizona State	8–5–2	8	2014
SEC	Arkansas	11–3–0	7	2019
West Coast	BYU	10–3–1	21	2019
ACC	Clemson	12–4–0	21	2019
Pac-12	Colorado	9–5–2	12	2019
ACC	Duke	10–5–3	26	2019
American	Memphis	8–3–0	9	2019
ACC	North Carolina	15–1–0	39	2019
Big Ten	Ohio State	7–2–3	13	2018
Big 12	Oklahoma State	12–3–1	13	2019
SEC	Ole Miss	10–5–0	9	2018
Big Ten	Penn State	10–2–1	26	2019
Big Ten	Rutgers	8–3–3	15	2019
SEC	South Carolina	10–4–0	14	2019
SEC	Texas A&M	11–3–0	26	2019
Pac-12	USC	7–3–3	19	2019
ACC	Virginia	10–4–2	33	2019
Pac-12	Washington	9–3–3	15	2019
Big 12	West Virginia	10–2–1	21	2019

== Bracket ==
First Round
Elon	0
Milwaukee	1
Penn State	5
Alabama State	0
Arizona State	4
Siena	0
Ole Miss (pen.)	0 (4)
Bowling Green	0 (3)
Rice	3
Furman	1
Virginia	3
SIUE	1
New Mexico (pen.)	1 (4)
Navy	1 (2)
South Carolina	1
Montana	0
Iowa	1
Campbell	0
Rutgers	1
Southeastern Louisiana	0
Memphis	0
Utah Valley	1
Ohio State	5
Stony Brook	1
South Florida	3
Central Connecticut	0
Colorado	0
South Alabama	1
Washington	3
Liberty	0
Denver	3
Loyola-Chicago	1

Second Round
1	Florida State	3
Milwaukee	0
Penn State	2
16	Vanderbilt	0
9	Duke (a.e.t.)	2
Arizona State	1
Ole Miss (pen.)	2 (3)
8	USC	2 (2)
5	West Virginia	0
Rice	1
Virginia	2
12	BYU	0
4	TCU	6
New Mexico	2
South Carolina	0
13	Georgetown	1
3	UCLA	2
Iowa	1
Rutgers	1 (3)
14	Clemson (pen.)	1 (5)
6	Arkansas	3
Utah Valley	1
Ohio State	1
11	Santa Clara	4
7	Texas A&M	2
South Florida	0
South Alabama	0
10	Oklahoma State	7
15	Saint Louis	0 (3)
Washington (pen.)	0 (4)
Denver	0
2	North Carolina	2

Third Round
1	Florida State	3
Penn State	1
9	Duke	1
Ole Miss	0
Rice	0
Virginia	3
4	TCU (pen.)	1 (3)
13	Georgetown	1 (1)
3	UCLA	1 (5)
14	Clemson (pen.)	1 (6)
6	Arkansas	0
11	Santa Clara	2
7	Texas A&M (pen.)	3 (4)
10	Oklahoma State	3 (3)
Washington	0
2	North Carolina	1

Quarterfinals
1	Florida State (pen.)	0 (5)
9	Duke	0 (3)
Virginia	1
4	TCU	0
14	Clemson	0
11	Santa Clara	1
7	Texas A&M	0
2	North Carolina	1

Semifinals
1	Florida State (pen.)	0 (3)
Virginia	0 (0)
11	Santa Clara	3
2	North Carolina	1

Championship
1	Florida State	1 (1)
11	Santa Clara (pen.)	1 (4)

== Results ==
=== First Round ===
April 27, 2021	Denver	3–1	Loyola-Chicago	Matthews, North Carolina
3:00 p.m. EDT	Sami Feller 25'; Sydney Sharp 61'; Kaitlyn Glover 84'	Report	1' Abby Swanson	Stadium: Mathews Sportsplex; Attendance: 58; Referee: Skye Arthur-Banning; Assistant referees: Rick Rogers; Chris Zuerner; Fourth official: Richonne Clark

April 27, 2021	Iowa	1–0	Campbell	Buies Creek, North Carolina
3:00 p.m. EDT	Sara Wheaton 4'; Natalie Massa (yellow card) 43'	Report		Stadium: Eakes Athletics Complex; Attendance: 250

April 27, 2021	South Florida	3–0	Central Connecticut	Greensboro, North Carolina
3:00 p.m. EDT	Chiara Hahn 52'; Paula Leblic 64'; Vivianne Bessette 71'	Report	(yellow card) 23' Kristina Kelly	Stadium: Bryan Park; Attendance: 125; Referee: Stephen Foster; Assistant referees: Kevin Uitto; Jennifer Dumaine

April 27, 2021	Ole Miss	0–0 (a.e.t.) (4–3 p)	Bowling Green	Wilmington, North Carolina
6:00 p.m. EDT	Madisyn Pezzino (yellow card) 40'	Report	(yellow card) 88' Audrey Shea	Stadium: UNCW Soccer Stadium; Attendance: 232; Referee: Marc Lawrence; Assistant referees: Javier Rodriguez; Brandom Ingram; Fourth official: Bradley Shrader
	Penalties
	Channing Foster (penalty missed); Taylor Radecki (penalty missed); Haleigh Stackpole (penalty scored); Madisyn Pezzino (penalty scored); Sophie Dineen (penalty missed); Lucy Green (penalty scored); Mo O'Connor (penalty scored)		(penalty scored) Madi Wolfbauer; (penalty missed) Kennedy White; (penalty scored) Nikki Cox; (penalty missed) Lynsey Spotts; (penalty missed) Ruby Linton; (penalty scored) Jasmijn Dijsselhof; (penalty missed) Rachel Muller

April 27, 2021	New Mexico	1–1 (a.e.t.) (4–2 p)	Navy	Wilson, North Carolina
6:00 p.m. EDT	Alesia Garcia 70'	Report	1' Molly Gillcrist; (yellow card) 89' Avery Fries	Stadium: J. Burt Gillette Athletic Complex; Attendance: 100
	Penalties
	Alexa Kirton (penalty missed); Jadyn Edwards (penalty scored); Gwen Maly (penalty scored); Maysa Walters (penalty scored); Madi Hirschman (penalty scored)		(penalty scored) Carolyn Mang; (penalty missed) Kassidy Borden; (penalty scored) Kat Healey; (penalty missed) Emily Keast

April 27, 2021	Colorado	0–1	South Alabama	Greensboro, North Carolina
7:00 p.m. EDT	Hannah Sharts (yellow card) 34'	Report	58' Tilly Wilkes; (yellow card) 82' Brenna McPartlan	Stadium: Bryan Park; Attendance: 300; Referee: Jude Carr; Assistant referees: Justin Howard; Eric Weisbrod

April 27, 2021	Rutgers	1–0	Southeastern Louisiana	Buies Creek, North Carolina
7:00 p.m. EDT	Amirah Ali 86'	Report	(yellow card) 88' Makenzie Maher	Stadium: Eakes Athletics Complex; Attendance: 250; Referee: Brandon Gardner; Assistant referees: Jeremy Smith; Kyle Johnston; Fourth official: Kayla Polonsky

April 27, 2021	Washington	3–0	Liberty	Matthews, North Carolina
7:00 p.m. EDT	Ameera Hussen 5'; Karlee Stueckle 40'; Olivia Van der Jagt 51'	Report		Stadium: Mathews Sportsplex; Attendance: 113; Referee: Elvis Osmanovic; Assistant referees: Shaen Tehini; Eric Usher; Fourth official: Amin Hadzic

April 28, 2021	Arizona State	4–0	Siena	Greenville, North Carolina
Noon EDT	Nicole Douglas 9'; Lucy Johnson 61'; Lieske Carleer 69'; Cori Sullivan 88'	Report		Stadium: Johnson Stadium; Attendance: 81; Referee: Patrick Schmidt; Assistant referees: Erick Varone; David McPhun; Fourth official: Brandon Gardner

April 28, 2021	Elon	0–1	Milwaukee	Cary, North Carolina
3:00 p.m. EDT	Lily Harkes (yellow card) 55'	Report	76' McKenna Stratton	Stadium: WakeMed Soccer Park Field 4 Attendance: 150; Referee: Richonne Clark; Assistant referees: Khadime Sabara; Emma Richards; Fourth official: Kyle Johnston

April 28, 2021	Rice	3–1	Furman	Cary, North Carolina
3:00 p.m. EDT	Natalie Gorgi 24', 36'; Mikala Furuto 65'	Report	17' Kyndal Anderson	Stadium: WakeMed Soccer Park Field 2 Attendance: 135; Referee: Nicole Green; Assistant referees: Justin Howard; Robert Dail; Fourth official: Alla Stepanov

April 28, 2021	Memphis	0–1	Utah Valley	Greenville, North Carolina
4:00 p.m. EDT		Report	(yellow card) 56', (goal) 59' Sadie Brockbank; (yellow card) 60' Julianna Carter	Stadium: Johnson Stadium; Attendance: 74; Referee: Mark Kadelisck; Assistant referees: Aaron Gallagher; Jennifer Dumaine; Fourth official: Carmen Serbio

April 28, 2021	South Carolina	1–0	Montana	Wilson, North Carolina
6:00 p.m. EDT	Corinna Zullo 56'	Report		Stadium: J. Burt Gillette Athletic Complex; Attendance: 176; Referee: Ryan Nee; Assistant referees: Kayla Polonsky; Javier Rodriguez; Fourth official: Stephen Foster

April 28, 2021	Penn State	5–0	Alabama State	Cary, North Carolina
7:00 p.m. EDT	Frankie Tagliaferri 17', 25'; Payton Linnehan 27'; Olivia Damico 32'; Unknown 73' (o.g.)	Report		Stadium: WakeMed Soccer Park Field 4 Attendance: 100; Referee: Jude Carr; Assistant referees: Ray Thomas; Clive Edwards; Fourth official: Ross McKernan

April 28, 2021	Virginia	3–1	SIU Edwardsville	Cary, North Carolina
7:00 p.m. EDT	Alexa Spaanstra 40', 56' (pen.); Talia Staude 68'	Report	12' Maria Haro; (yellow card) 66' Emma Dutko; (yellow card) 85' Mackenzie Litzsinger	Stadium: WakeMed Soccer Park Field 2 Attendance: 145; Referee: Jude Carr; Assistant referees: Raymond Thomas; Clive Edwards; Fourth official: Ross McKernan

April 28, 2021	Ohio State	5–1	Stony Brook	Greenville, North Carolina
8:00 p.m. EDT	Alyssa Baumbick 7', 19'; Emma Sears 11'; Kitty Jones-Black 39'; Meghan Kammerdeiner 74'	Report	17' Rachel Florenz	Stadium: Johnson Stadium; Attendance: 59; Referee: David Erbacher; Assistant referees: Bradley Schrader; Rick Rogers; Fourth official: Hicham El Bariqi

=== Second Round ===
April 30, 2021	No. 2 North Carolina	2–0	Denver	Matthews, North Carolina
3:00 p.m. EDT	Abby Allen 41'; Rachael Dorwart 70'; Hallie Klanke (yellow card) 70'	Report	(yellow card) 40' Jordan Crockett; (yellow card) 69' Taylor Wells	Stadium: Mathews Sportsplex; Attendance: 327; Referee: Laura Rodriguez; Assistant referees: Carlos Pielago; Heber Estrada; Fourth official: Izlen Peksenar

April 30, 2021	No. 7 Texas A&M	2–0	South Florida	Greensboro, North Carolina
3:00 p.m. EDT	Bárbara Olivieri 49' (pen.), 66'	Report	(yellow card) 22' Vivianne Bessette	Stadium: Bryan Park; Attendance: 300; Referee: Pete Mandell; Assistant referees: Richard Crowgey; Tim Eller; Fourth official: Mark Garcia

April 30, 2021	No. 3 UCLA	2–1	Iowa	Buies Creek, North Carolina
3:00 p.m. EDT	Reilyn Turner 85', 90'	Report	6' Meike Ingles; (yellow card) 89' Sara Wheaton	Stadium: Eakes Athletics Complex; Attendance: 250; Referee: Danielle Chesky; Assistant referees: Kiah Haslett; Aaron Gallagher; Fourth official: Lucas Feathers

April 30, 2021	No. 8 USC	2–2 (a.e.t.) (2–3 p)	Ole Miss	Wilmington, North Carolina
6:00 p.m. EDT	Tara McKeown 23'; Zoe Burns 43'	Report	69' Haleigh Stackpole; (yellow card) 77' Ole Miss team; 79' Ramsey Davis; (yellow card) 95' Saydie Holland	Stadium: UNCW Soccer Stadium; Attendance: 250; Referee: Bill Dittmar; Assistant referees: Caleb Fearing; Ross McKernan; Fourth official: Brandon Ingram
	Penalties
	Penelope Hocking (penalty missed); Madeline Vergura (penalty missed); Olufolasade Adamolekun (penalty scored); Jennifer Westendorf (penalty scored); Tara McKeown (penalty missed)		(penalty scored) Channing Foster; (penalty missed) Haleigh Stackpole; (penalty missed) Madisyn Pezzino; (penalty scored) Molly Martin; (penalty scored) Mo O'Connor

April 30, 2021	No. 4 TCU	6–2	New Mexico	Wilson, North Carolina
6:00 p.m. EDT	Messiah Bright 47'; Grace Collins 48', 51'; Payton Crews 51'; Avery Barron 74'; Maddy Warren 79'	Report	28', 79' Alesia Garcia	Stadium: J. Burt Gillette Athletic Complex; Attendance: 200; Referee: Shaun Papperman; Assistant referees: Lucy Bell; Matthew Bell; Fourth official: Karl Kummer

April 30, 2021	No. 14 Clemson	1–1 (a.e.t.) (5–3 p)	Rutgers	Buies Creek, North Carolina
7:00 p.m. EDT	Maliah Morris 27'	Report	85' Allison Lowrey	Stadium: Eakes Athletics Complex; Attendance: 250; Referee: Ashley Cedro; Assistant referees: Raymond Moffatte Jr; Katherine McCormick; Fourth official: Danny Marques
	Penalties
	Caroline Conti (penalty scored); Megan Bornkamp (penalty scored); Renée Guion (penalty scored); Makenna Morris (penalty scored); Samantha Meredith (penalty scored)		(penalty scored) Becci Fluchel; (penalty missed) Samantha Kroeger; (penalty scored) Gabby Provenzano; (penalty scored) Meagan McClelland

April 30, 2021	No. 10 Oklahoma State	7–0	South Alabama	Greensboro, North Carolina
7:00 p.m. EDT	Gabriella Coleman 15', 39'; Megan Haines 20', 64'; Grace Yochum 22', 26'; Olyvia Dowell 63'	Report	(red card) 21' Gabrielle Gayle	Stadium: Bryan Park; Attendance: 300

April 30, 2021	No. 15 Saint Louis	0–0 (a.e.t.) (3–4 p)	Washington	Matthews, North Carolina
7:00 p.m. EDT	Abbie Miller (yellow card) 98'	Report	(yellow card) 70' Laura Roberts; (yellow card) 94' Sianna Siemonsma	Stadium: Mathews Sportsplex; Attendance: 106; Referee: Megan McCain; Assistant referees: Travis Haight; Brandon Adams; Fourth official: Nikola Aleksic
	Penalties
	Abbie Miller (penalty scored); Hannah Friedrich (penalty missed); Brianna Hatfield (penalty missed); Caroline Kelly (penalty scored); Jess Preusser (penalty scored)		(penalty scored) Olivia Van der Jagt; (penalty scored) Mary Johnston; (penalty scored) Karlee Stueckle; (penalty missed) Ally Remington; (penalty scored) Olivia Sekany

May 1, 2021	No. 9 Duke	2–1 (a.e.t.)	Arizona State	Greenville, North Carolina
Noon EDT	Tess Boade 29'; Sophie Jones 103'	Report	87' Nicole Douglas	Stadium: Johnson Stadium; Attendance: 200; Referee: Mark Garcia; Assistant referees: Robert Velbis; Kevin Maurer; Fourth official: John Brady

May 1, 2021	No. 5 West Virginia	0–1	Rice	Cary, North Carolina
Noon EDT		Report	(yellow card) 69' Natalie Gorji; 74' (pen.) Delaney Schultz	Stadium: WakeMed Soccer Park Field 2 Attendance: 147

May 1, 2021	No. 12 BYU	0–2	Virginia	Cary, North Carolina
3:00 p.m. EDT		Report	Alexa Spaanstra 34', 64'	Stadium: WakeMed Soccer Park Field 2 Attendance: 150

May 1, 2021	No. 1 Florida State	3–0	Milwaukee	Cary, North Carolina
3:00 p.m. EDT	Kristen McFarland 49'; Gabby Carle 76'; Jaelin Howell 79'	Report	(yellow card) 33' Maggy Henschler; (yellow card) 89' Julia Barajas	Stadium: WakeMed Soccer Park Field 4 Attendance: 144

May 1, 2021	No. 6 Arkansas	3–1	Utah Valley	Greenville, North Carolina
4:00 p.m. EDT	Parker Goins 41', 48'; Kaelee Van Gundy 50'	Report	73' Sadie Brockbank	Stadium: Johnson Stadium; Attendance: 158; Referee: Danielle Chesky; Assistant referees: Lucas Feathers; Scott Bowers; Fourth official: Jeremy Scheer

May 1, 2021	No. 13 Georgetown	1–0	South Carolina	Wilson, North Carolina
6:00 p.m. EDT	Jenna Menta 90'	Report		Stadium: J. Burt Gillette Athletic Complex; Attendance: 312; Referee: Ashley Cedro; Assistant referees: Karl Kummer; Aaron Hormuth; Fourth official: Raymond Moffatte Jr

May 1, 2021	No. 16 Vanderbilt	0–2	Penn State	Cary, North Carolina
7:00 p.m. EDT	Haley Hopkins (yellow card) 88'	Report	62' Kristin Schnurr; 73' Eva Alonso	Stadium: WakeMed Soccer Park Field 4 Attendance: 145; Referee: Laura Rodriguez; Assistant referees: Shaun Pepperman; Lucy Bell; Fourth official: Sam Bilbo

May 1, 2021	No. 11 Santa Clara	4–1	Ohio State	Greenville, North Carolina
8:00 p.m. EDT	Izzy D'Aquila (yellow card) 2', (goal) 6'; Kelsey Turnbow 25', (yellow card) 55'; Skylar Smith 53'; Makoto Nezu 56'	Report	(red card) 32' Kayla Fischer; 61' Peyton McNamara; (yellow card) 67' Kine Fløtre	Stadium: Johnson Stadium; Attendance: 116; Referee: Danny Marques; Assistant referees: Riah Haslett; John Matto

=== Third Round ===
May 5, 2021	No. 9 Duke	1–0	Ole Miss	Cary, North Carolina
Noon EDT	Caitlin Cosme 3'	Report		Stadium: WakeMed Soccer Park Field 2 Attendance: 185; Referee: JC Griggs; Assistant referees: Tiffini Turpin; Kyle Johnson; Fourth official: Ross McKernan

May 5, 2021	No. 7 Texas A&M	3–3 (a.e.t.) (4–3 p)	No. 10 Oklahoma State	Cary, North Carolina
Noon EDT	Taylor Ziemer 17'; Ali Russell 44'; Kendall Bates (yellow card) 57'; Taylor Pounds 80'	Report	(yellow card) 13' (yellow-red card) 91' Charmé Morgan; 15', 78' Gabriella Coleman; 48', (yellow card) 71' Olyvia Dowell	Stadium: WakeMed Soccer Park Field 4 Referee: Elvis Mahmutovic; Assistant referees: Meghan Mullen; Cory Richardson; Fourth official: Daniel Radford
	Penalties
	Taylor Ziemer (penalty scored); Barbara Olivieri (penalty scored); Daria Britton (penalty scored); Lauren Geczik (penalty missed); Laney Carroll (penalty scored)		(penalty scored) Grace Yochum; (penalty scored) Kim Rodriguez; (penalty scored) Ally Jackson; (penalty missed) Olyvia Dowell; (penalty missed) Hannah Webb

May 5, 2021	No. 1 Florida State	3–1	Penn State	Cary, North Carolina
3:00 p.m. EDT	Kristina Lynch 31'; Clara Robbins 62'; Gabby Carle 69' (pen.)	Report	20' Frankie Tagliaferri	Stadium: WakeMed Soccer Park Field 2 Attendance: 185; Referee: John Brady; Assistant referees: Rachel Smith; Bill Dittmar; Fourth official: Lucas Feathers

May 5, 2021	No. 2 North Carolina	1–0	Washington	Cary, North Carolina
3:00 p.m. EDT	Rachel Jones (yellow card) 57'; Tori Hansen 67'; Talia DellaPeruta (yellow card) 74'	Report	(yellow card) 56' Sianna Siemonsma	Stadium: WakeMed Soccer Park Field 4 Attendance: 150; Referee: Samantha Martinez; Assistant referees: Ryan Starr; Kevin Maurer; Fourth official: Tori Penso

May 5, 2021	No. 4 TCU	1–1 (a.e.t.) (3–1 p)	No. 13 Georgetown	Cary, North Carolina
6:00 p.m. EDT	Yazmeen Ryan (yellow card) 66'; Michelle Slater 77'	Report	31' Maya Fernandez-Powell; (yellow card) 82' Grace Nguyen	Stadium: WakeMed Soccer Park Field 2 Attendance: 123; Referee: Brandon Marion; Assistant referees: Justin Howard; Robert Dail; Fourth official: Elvis Osmanovich
	Penalties
	Yazmeen Ryan (penalty scored); Grace Collins (penalty scored); Maddy Warren (penalty scored)		(penalty scored) Maya Fernandez-Powell; (penalty missed) Kelly Ann Livingstone; (penalty missed) Charlie Kern; (penalty missed) Erin Junkmann

May 5, 2021	No. 3 UCLA	1–1 (a.e.t.) (5–6 p)	No. 14 Clemson	Cary, North Carolina
6:00 p.m. EDT	Olivia Athens 87'; Team (yellow card) 93'	Report	(yellow card) 26' Maliah Morris; (yellow card) 41' Megan Bornkamp; 53' Samantha Meredith	Stadium: WakeMed Soccer Park Field 4 Attendance: 103; Referee: Mark Kadlecik; Assistant referees: Jude Carr; Khadime Sabarra; Fourth official: Raymond Thomas
	Penalties
	Olivia Athens (penalty scored); Aislynn Crowder (penalty scored); Delanie Sheehan (penalty scored); Lucy Parker (penalty scored); Marley Canales (penalty scored); Madelyn Desiano (penalty missed)		(penalty scored) Megan Bornkamp; (penalty scored) Renée Guion; (penalty scored) Caroline Conti; (penalty scored) Makenna Morris; (penalty scored) Harper White; (penalty scored) Samantha Meredith

May 5, 2021	No. 6 Arkansas	0–2	No. 11 Santa Clara	Cary, North Carolina
9:00 p.m. EDT	Emilee Hauser (yellow card) 48'	Report	28' Izzy D'Aquila; 73' Skylar Smith	Stadium: WakeMed Soccer Park Field 4 Attendance: 96; Referee: Nick Balcer; Assistant referees: Jeremy Smith; Emma Richards

May 5, 2021	Rice	0–3	Virginia	Cary, North Carolina
9:00 p.m. EDT	Mijke Roelfsema (yellow card) 51'	Report	37' (pen.), 68', 82' Diana Ordóñez	Stadium: WakeMed Soccer Park Field 2 Attendance: 167; Referee: Brian Miller; Assistant referees: Ryan Graves; Rick Rogers; Fourth official: Sorin Stocia

=== Quarterfinals ===
May 9, 2021	No. 1 Florida State	0–0 (a.e.t.) (5–3 p)	No. 9 Duke	Cary, North Carolina
1:00 p.m. EDT	Jaelin Howell (yellow card) 16'	Report		Stadium: WakeMed Soccer Park Field 2 Attendance: 164; Referee: Samantha Martinez; Assistant referees: Kayla Polonsky; Jeremy Smith; Fourth official: Robert Dail
	Penalties
	Clara Robbins (penalty scored); Emily Madril (penalty scored); Gabby Carle (penalty scored); Jaelin Howell (penalty scored); Yujie Zhao (penalty scored)		(penalty missed) Taylor Mitchell; (penalty scored) Tess Boade; (penalty scored) Katie Groff; (penalty scored) Maggie Graham

May 9, 2021	No. 2 North Carolina	1–0	No. 7 Texas A&M	Cary, North Carolina
1:00 p.m. EDT	Rachel Dorwart 42'; Rachel Jones (yellow card) 89'	Report		Stadium: WakeMed Soccer Park Field 4 Attendance: 164; Referee: Jonathan Weiner; Assistant referees: Eric Usher; Emma Richards; Fourth official: Matt Thompson

May 9, 2021	No. 4 TCU	0–1	Virginia	Cary, North Carolina
5:00 p.m. EDT	Team (yellow card) 65'	Report	59' Lizzy Sieracki	Stadium: WakeMed Soccer Park Field 2 Attendance: 178; Referee: Christina Unkel; Assistant referees: Kevin Maurer; Zach McWhorter; Fourth official: Dustin Thorne

May 9, 2021	No. 11 Santa Clara	1–0	No. 14 Clemson	Cary, North Carolina
5:00 p.m. EDT	Sally Menti 18'	Report	(yellow card) 87' Kimber Haley	Stadium: WakeMed Soccer Park Field 4 Attendance: 118; Referee: Corey Rockwell; Assistant referees: Alla Stepanov; Hudson Owens

=== Semifinals ===
May 13, 2021	No. 1 Florida State	0–0 (a.e.t.) (3–0 p)	Virginia	Cary, North Carolina
6:30 p.m. EDT	Kristen McFarland (yellow card) 53'	Report	(yellow card) 68' Lia Godfrey	Stadium: WakeMed Soccer Park; Referee: Alyssa Nichols; Assistant referees: Laura Chambers; Matt Rodman; Fourth official: Abas Piran
	Penalties
	Clara Robbins (penalty scored); Emily Madril (penalty scored); Gabby Carle (penalty scored)		(penalty missed) Alexa Spaanstra; (penalty missed) Diana Ordóñez; (penalty missed) Taryn Torres

May 13, 2021	No. 2 North Carolina	1–3	No. 11 Santa Clara	Cary, North Carolina
8:30 p.m. EDT	Brianna Pinto 50'; Tori Hansen (yellow card) 77'	Report	19' Izzy D'Aquila; 50' Kelsey Turnbow; 59' Skylar Smith; (yellow card) 78' Sally Menti	Stadium: WakeMed Soccer Park; Attendance: 2,166; Referee: Elvis Mahmutovic; Assistant referees: Meghan Mullen; Kayla Polonsky; Fourth official: Salma Perez

=== Final ===
May 17, 2021	No. 1 Florida State	1–1 (a.e.t.) (1–4 p)	No. 11 Santa Clara	Cary, North Carolina
5:30 p.m. EDT	Nighswonger 62'	Report	Turnbow 83'	Stadium: WakeMed Soccer Park; Attendance: 5,000; Referee: Christina Unkel
	Penalties
	Robbins (penalty missed); Madril (penalty missed); Carle (penalty scored)		(penalty scored) Doyle; (penalty scored) Menti; (penalty scored) Turnbow; (penalty scored) D'Aquila

Rankings shown are tournament seeds

== Record by conference ==
Conference	Bids	Record	Pct.	R32	R16	QF	SF	F	NC
ACC	5	11–2–7	.725	5	5	5	3	1	–
SEC	5	3–5–3	.409	5	3	1	–	–	–
Pac-12	5	3–3–3	.500	4	2	–	–	–	–
Big Ten	4	5–3–1	.611	4	1	–	–	–	–
Big 12	3	2–2–2	.500	3	2	1	–	–	–
West Coast	2	4–1–1	.750	2	1	1	1	1	1
American	2	1–2–0	.333	1	–	–	–	–	–
Big East	1	1–0–1	.750	1	1	–	–	–	–
C-USA	1	2–1–0	.667	1	1	–	–	–	–
Atlantic 10	1	0–0–1	.500	1	–	–	–	–	–
Horizon	1	1–1–0	.500	1	–	–	–	–	–
Mountain West	1	0–1–1	.250	1	–	–	–	–	–
Summit	1	1–1–0	.500	1	–	–	–	–	–
Sun Belt	1	1–1–0	.500	1	–	–	–	–	–
WAC	1	1–1–0	.500	1	–	–	–	–	–
ASUN	1	0–1–0	.000	–	–	–	–	–	–
America East	1	0–1–0	.000	–	–	–	–	–	–
Big Sky	1	0–1–0	.000	–	–	–	–	–	–
Big South	1	0–1–0	.000	–	–	–	–	–	–
Colonial	1	0–1–0	.000	–	–	–	–	–	–
MAAC	1	0–1–0	.000	–	–	–	–	–	–
MAC	1	0–0–1	.500	–	–	–	–	–	–
MVC	1	0–1–0	.000	–	–	–	–	–	–
NEC	1	0–1–0	.000	–	–	–	–	–	–
OVC	1	0–1–0	.000	–	–	–	–	–	–
Patriot	1	0–0–1	.500	–	–	–	–	–	–
Southern	1	0–1–0	.000	–	–	–	–	–	–
Southland	1	0–1–0	.000	–	–	–	–	–	–
SWAC	1	0–1–0	.000	–	–	–	–	–	–

- The R32, S16, E8, F4, CG, and NC columns indicate how many teams from each conference were in the Round of 32 (second round), Round of 16 (third round), Quarterfinals, Semifinals, Final, and National Champion, respectively.

== Statistics ==
=== Goalscorers ===
There were 120 goals scored in 47 matches, for an average of 2.55 goals per match.

4 goals

- (United States) Gabriella Coleman – Oklahoma State
- (United States) Alexa Spaanstra – Virginia

3 goals

- (United States) Alesia Garcia – New Mexico
- (United States) Frankie Tagliaferri – Penn State
- (United States) Izzy D'Aquila – Santa Clara
- (United States) Skylar Smith – Santa Clara
- (United States) Kelsey Turnbow – Santa Clara
- (Mexico) Diana Ordóñez - Virginia

2 goals

- (England) Nicole Douglas – Arizona State
- (United States) Parker Goins – Arkansas
- (Canada) Gabby Carle – Florida State
- (United States) Rachael Dorwart – North Carolina
- (United States) Alyssa Baumbick – Ohio State
- (United States) Olyvia Dowell – Oklahoma State
- (United States) Megan Haines – Oklahoma State
- (United States) Grace Yochum – Oklahoma State
- (United States) Natalie Gorji – Rice
- (United States) Grace Collins – TCU
- (Venezuela) Bárbara Olivieri – Texas A&M
- (United States) Reilyn Turner – UCLA
- (United States) Sadie Brockbank – Utah Valley

1 goal

- (Netherlands) Lieske Carleer – Arizona State
- (England) Lucy Johnson – Arizona State
- (United States) Cori Sullivan – Arizona State
- (United States) Kaelee Van Gundy – Arkansas
- (United States) Samantha Meredith – Clemson
- (United States) Maliah Morris – Clemson
- (United States) Sami Feller – Denver
- (United States) Kaitlyn Glover – Denver
- (United States) Sydney Sharp – Denver
- (United States) Tess Boade – Duke
- (Puerto Rico) Caitlin Cosme – Duke
- (United States) Sophie Jones – Duke
- (United States) Jaelin Howell – Florida State
- (United States) Kristina Lynch – Florida State
- (United States) Kristen McFarland – Florida State
- (United States) Jenna Nighswonger – Florida State
- (United States) Clara Robbins – Florida State
- (United States) Kyndal Anderson – Furman
- (United States) Maya Fernandez-Powell – Georgetown
- (United States) Jenna Menta – Georgetown
- (United States) Meike Ingles – Iowa
- (United States) Sara Wheaton – Iowa
- (United States) Abby Swanson – Loyola Chicago
- (United States) McKenna Stratton – Milwaukee
- (United States) Molly Gillcrist – Navy
- (United States) Abby Allen – North Carolina
- (United States) Tori Hansen – North Carolina
- (United States) Brianna Pinto – North Carolina
- (United States) Kitty Jones-Black – Ohio State
- (United States) Meghan Kammerdeiner – Ohio State
- (Jamaica) Peyton McNamara – Ohio State
- (United States) Emma Sears – Ohio State
- (United States) Ramsey Davis – Ole Miss
- (United States) Haleigh Stackpole – Ole Miss
- (Spain) Eva Alonso – Penn State
- (United States) Olivia Damico – Penn State
- (United States) Payton Linnehan – Penn State
- (United States) Kristin Schnurr – Penn State
- (United States) Mikala Furuto – Rice
- (United States) Delaney Schultz – Rice
- (United States) Amirah Ali – Rutgers
- (United States) Allison Lowrey – Rutgers
- (United States) Sally Menti – Santa Clara
- (Japan) Makoto Nezu – Santa Clara
- (United States) Maria Haro – SIU Edwardsville
- (England) Tilly Wilkes – South Alabama
- (United States) Corinna Zullo – South Carolina
- (Canada) Vivianne Bessette – South Florida
- (Germany) Chiara Hahn – South Florida
- (Spain) Paula Leblic – South Florida
- (United States) Rachel Florenz – Stony Brook
- (United States) Avery Barron – TCU
- (United States) Messiah Bright – TCU
- (United States) Payton Crews – TCU
- (United States) Michelle Slater – TCU
- (United States) Maddy Warren – TCU
- (United States) Taylor Pounds – Texas A&M
- (United States) Ali Russell – Texas A&M
- (United States) Taylor Ziemer – Texas A&M
- (United States) Olivia Athens – UCLA
- (Canada) Zoe Burns – USC
- (United States) Tara McKeown – USC
- (United States) Lizzy Sieracki – Virginia
- (United States) Talia Staude – Virginia
- (United States) Ameera Hussen – Washington
- (United States) Karlee Stueckle – Washington
- (United States) Olivia Van der Jagt – Washington

1 own goal

- Unknown – Alabama State (against Penn State)
