= Oklahoma State Cowgirls soccer =

American college soccer team

- Founded: 1996; 30 years ago
- University: Oklahoma State University
- Athletic director: Chad Weiberg
- Head coach: Colin Carmichael (22nd season)
- Conference: Big 12
- Location: Stillwater, Oklahoma, US
- Stadium: Neal Patterson Stadium (capacity: 2,500)
- Nickname: Cowgirls
- Colors: Orange and black

NCAA tournament Quarterfinals
- 2010, 2011

NCAA tournament Round of 16
- 2010, 2011, 2020

NCAA tournament Round of 32
- 2006, 2007, 2008, 2009, 2010, 2011, 2017, 2019, 2020

NCAA tournament appearances
- 2003, 2006, 2007, 2008, 2009, 2010, 2011, 2013, 2014, 2016, 2017, 2019, 2020, 2024

Conference tournament championships
- 2003, 2009, 2010

Conference regular season championships
- 2008, 2011, 2017, 2019

The Oklahoma State Cowgirls soccer team represents Oklahoma State University in the Big 12 Conference of NCAA Division I soccer. The team was founded in 1996 and the program is led by their 22nd-year head coach, Colin Carmichael.

The Cowgirls have made 14 appearances in the NCAA Tournament, reaching the quarterfinals twice, in 2010 and 2011. Oklahoma State has also won a total of seven Big 12 conference titles, with the most recent coming in 2019.

== History ==
The Oklahoma State Cowgirls played their first season of soccer in 1996, earning an 8–0 shutout victory over Oklahoma Christian in the first game in program history. The Cowgirls would struggle in their first few seasons, but would record their first winning season in 2002, going 13–7–0.

Oklahoma State would pick up the program's first hardware in 2003, seven years after the foundation of the program, when the Cowgirls defeated Missouri in the Big 12 tournament championship to claim their first conference title and clinch the program's first trip to the NCAA women's soccer tournament. The program's first NCAA tournament win would come in 2006, when Oklahoma State defeated UNC Greensboro. Two years later, the Cowgirls would win the school's first Big 12 regular season conference title in 2008, going 7–1–2 in conference play. The following year, Oklahoma State would claim their third conference title in 2009, winning the Big 12 tournament championship over Texas A&M.

Oklahoma State would go on to have their most successful seasons in 2010 and 2011. Led by goalkeeper Adrianna Franch, the Cowgirls would clinch their fourth conference title in 2010, defeating Bedlam rival Oklahoma in the Big 12 tournament championship. In the NCAA tournament, Oklahoma State would record wins over Michigan, Oregon State and Duke, advancing all the way to the NCAA Quarterfinals before falling to eventual national champion Notre Dame. The Cowgirls would manage to find success again a year later, going undefeated in conference play en route to winning the Big 12 regular season title in 2011 for the program's fifth overall conference championship. Oklahoma State would again have an impressive showing in the NCAA tournament, defeating Arkansas Pine–Bluff, Illinois and Maryland to punch their ticket back to the NCAA Quarterfinals. For the second consecutive year, the Cowgirls would be unable to advance further. A close loss to eventual national champion Stanford would end the Cowgirls' season in heartbreaking fashion.

The Cowgirls would win their sixth conference title in 2017, clinching the Big 12 regular season championship with an overtime win over Texas before advancing to the Round of 32 in the NCAA tournament. Oklahoma State would win the program's seventh conference title in 2019, recording a 7–1–1 conference record and again advancing to the Round of 32 in the NCAA tournament. The Cowgirls advanced to the Round of 16 for the third time in program history in 2020, blowing out South Alabama before falling to Texas A&M.

Individually, 12 Cowgirls have received All-America honors, with six of them being First-Team honors.

== Facilities ==
Officially dedicated on Aug. 19, 2018, Neal Patterson Stadium is a showcase for Cowgirl Soccer and one of the top soccer facilities in the collegiate ranks, boasting a permanent capacity of 2,500. The stadium was named after its major benefactor and Oklahoma State alumnus, the late Neal Patterson, and cost over $20 million to construct. Team facilities include locker rooms, meeting areas, kitchen facilities, sports medicine areas and equipment rooms. Other unique aspects of Patterson Stadium include a large roof that covers much of the seating areas, home and visitor bench areas with chairback seating built into the stadium, and a 26-foot by 40-foot high-definition video scoreboard in the southeast corner of the facility.

In the first game at Neal Patterson Stadium, Oklahoma State defeated rival Oklahoma, 2–1.

== Season-by-season results ==
Regular season champion	Tournament champion

Season Results
Year	Coach	Overall record	Conference record	Conference standing	Postseason	Rank
(Big 12 Conference) (1996–Present)
1996	Colin Carmichael and Karen Hancock	10–7–2	1–6–2	9th		
1997	Karen Hancock	9–9–1	4–6–0	T-6th		
1998	Karen Hancock	7–8–3	1–6–3	T-9th		
1999	Karen Hancock	5–14–0	2–8–0	T-10th		
2000	Karen Hancock	4–14–1	1–8–1	11th		
2001	Karen Hancock	8–10–1	2–7–1	9th		
2002	Karen Hancock	13–7–0	4–6–0	7th		
2003	Karen Hancock	15–5–3	3–4–3	7th	NCAA First Round	
2004	Karen Hancock	12–6–2	4–5–1	7th		
2005	Colin Carmichael and Karen Hancock	10–6–3	3–6–1	9th		
2006	Colin Carmichael and Karen Hancock	17–3–3	8–1–1	2nd	NCAA Second Round	17
2007	Colin Carmichael	14–6–3	5–4–1	T–5th	NCAA Second Round	23
2008	Colin Carmichael	18–1–4	7–1–2	1st	NCAA Second Round	13
2009	Colin Carmichael	15–7–2	5–5–0	T-5th	NCAA Second Round	
2010	Colin Carmichael	20–4–2	8–2–0	2nd	NCAA Quarterfinal	5
2011	Colin Carmichael	22–2–2	6–0–2	1st	NCAA Quarterfinal	5
2012	Colin Carmichael	11–6–3	1–4–3	7th		
2013	Colin Carmichael	9–7–6	2–3–3	6th	NCAA First Round	
2014	Colin Carmichael	10–10–1	5–2–1	2nd	NCAA First Round	
2015	Colin Carmichael	9–9–2	2–4–2	8th		
2016	Colin Carmichael	9–9–3	3–4–1	T-5th	NCAA First Round	
2017	Colin Carmichael	16–4–3	8–1–0	1st	NCAA Second Round	17
2018	Colin Carmichael	10–7–1	2–6–1	T-8th		
2019	Colin Carmichael	16–3–3	7–1–1	1st	NCAA Second Round	19
2020	Colin Carmichael	13–3–2	6–2–1	3rd	NCAA Third Round	14
2021	Colin Carmichael	9–6–3	4–3–1	4th		
2022	Colin Carmichael	11–4–4	4–2–3	5th		
2023	Colin Carmichael	12–8–0	5–5–0	7th		
2024	Colin Carmichael	14–5–3	6–3–2	5th	NCAA First Round	
2025	Colin Carmichael	4–13–2	0–10–1	16th		
2026	Colin Carmichael	7–8–4	3–6–2	T–10th		
Totals: 30 Years – 2 Coaches		359-211-72 (.615)		7 Conference championships	14 Postseason appearances	

== Current roster ==
As of August 2026

Note: Flags indicate national team as defined under FIFA eligibility rules; some limited exceptions apply. Players may hold more than one non-FIFA nationality.

No.	Pos.	Nation	Player
0	GK	USA	Logan Marks
00	GK	USA	Avery Bass
1	GK	USA	Clare Nichols
2	DF	USA	Victoria Madison
3	DF	USA	Ellie Geoffroy
4	DF/MF	USA	Emmy Hedden
5	DF	USA	Bryn Geppert
6	FW	USA	Sophia Baker
7	FW	PAN	Sherline King
8	DF	USA	Katelyn Hoppers
9	FW	CAN	Raquelle Mitchell
10	MF	GER	Emma Jensen
11	MF	USA	Laudan Wilson
12	FW	USA	Sonora DeFini
13	DF	USA	Lily Weiss
14	FW	USA	Gracie Bindbeutel

No.	Pos.	Nation	Player
15	DF	USA	Sophie Wilson
16	MF	USA	Bella Pierotti
17	MF	USA	Keaton Mitchell
18	DF	USA	Kayla Butki
19	FW	USA	Madi Asel
20	MF/FW	USA	Emily Senatore
21	DF	USA	Taryn Thibeau
22	DF	USA	Tyller Grimes
23	FW	USA	Aubrey Wagner
24	MF	USA	Addy Lang
26	DF	ENG	Chloe McHugh
31	FW	USA	Jada Moorman
34	DF	USA	Brenna Rowlett

== Awards ==
Player	Award	Season
Yolanda Odenyo	Big 12 Conference Co-Player of the Year	2006
Yolanda Odenyo	Big 12 Conference Offensive Player of the Year	2008
Melinda Mercado	Big 12 Conference Defensive Player of the Year	2010
Melinda Mercado	Big 12 Conference Defensive Player of the Year	2011
Courtney Dike	Big 12 Conference Co-Offensive Player of the Year	2016
Haley Woodard	Big 12 Conference Offensive Player of the Year	2017
Jaci Jones	Big 12 Conference Sportsperson of the Year	2020
Jordan Nytes	Big 12 Conference Co-Goalkeeper of the Year	2022
Alex Morris	Big 12 Soccer Scholar Athlete of the Year	2024

Coach	Award	Season
Karen Hancock (co-winner)	Big 12 Coach of the Year	2002
Karen Hancock and Colin Carmichael	Big 12 Coach of the Year	2006
Colin Carmichael	Big 12 Coach of the Year	2008
Colin Carmichael (co-winner)	Big 12 Coach of the Year	2010
Colin Carmichael	Big 12 Coach of the Year	2011
Colin Carmichael	Big 12 Coach of the Year	2017
Colin Carmichael	Big 12 Coach of the Year	2019

=== All-Big 12 Honors ===
Player	First team All-Big 12
Lauren Colwell	2003
Adriane Radtke	2004
Yolanda Odenyo	2006
Yolanda Odenyo	2007
Yolanda Odenyo	2008
Kasey Langdon	2008
Adrianna Franch	2009
Melinda Mercado	2009
Annika Niemeier	2009
Adrianna Franch	2010
Krista Lopez	2010
Melinda Mercado	2010
Kyndall Treadwell	2010
Elizabeth DeLozier	2011
Adrianna Franch	2011
Krista Lopez	2011
Melinda Mercado	2011
Carson Michalowski	2011
Adrianna Franch	2012
Allie Stephenson	2014
Allie Stephenson	2015
Courtney Dike	2016
Haley Woodard	2017
Anna Beffer	2017
Kim Rodriguez	2019
Grace Yochum	2019
Kim Rodriguez	2020
Olyvia Dowell	2020
Grace Yochum	2021
Jordan Nytes	2022
Grace Yochum	2022
Alex Morris	2024
Xcaret Pineda	2024
Laudan Wilson	2024

Player	Second team All-Big 12
Kat Doud	2002
Adriane Radtke	2003
Kathrin Lehmann	2003
Lauren Colwell	2004
Jolene Schweitzer	2004
Yolanda Odenyo	2005
Jesyca Rosholt	2005
Siera Strawser	2008
Kasey Langdon	2009
Carson Michalowski	2010
Megan Marchesano	2011
Kyndall Treadwell	2011
Megan Marchesano	2012
Carson Michalowski	2012
Natalie Calhoun	2013
Courtney Dike	2013
Allie Stephenson	2013
Natalie Calhoun	2014
Courtney Dike	2014
Madison Mercado	2014
Natalie Calhoun	2015
Courtney Dike	2015
Natalie Calhoun	2016
Laurene Tresfield	2017
Kim Rodriguez	2018
Olyvia Dowell	2019
Jaci Jones	2019
Charmé Morgan	2019
Gabriella Coleman	2020
Charmé Morgan	2020
Grace Yochum	2020
Olyvia Dowell	2021
Olyvia Dowell	2022
Ally Jackson	2022
Xcaret Pineda	2023
Mollie Breiner	2024
Gracie Bindbeutel	2024
Grace Gordon	2024

Note

- ‡ indicates player was Big 12 Newcomer of the Year
- † indicates player was Big 12 Freshman of the Year

All-Big 12 All-Newcomer/Freshman Honors

Player	Big 12 All-Newcomer/Freshman Team
Lauren Colwell	2002
Adriane Radtke	2003
Kathrin Lehmann	2003
Jesyca Rosholt	2005
Yolanda Odenyo	2005
Angelika Feldbacher	2005
Siera Strawser	2006
Bridget Miller	2006
Allyson Leggett	2007
Melinda Mercado	2008
Kyndall Treadwell	2008
Adrianna Franch	2009
Carson Michalowski	2009
Miriam Rhinehart	2011
Kelsey Bass	2012
Madison Mercado	2012
Courtney Dike	2013
Krissi Killion	2013
Michela Ongaro	2013
Marlo Zoller	2015
Jaci Jones	2016
Camy Huddleston	2017
Kim Rodriguez	2017
Grace Yochum	2018
Olyvia Dowell	2019
Grace Dennis	2020
Kionna Simon	2020
Evie Vitali	2021
Gracie Bindbeutel	2022
Jordan Nytes	2022
Chloé Joseph	2023
Laudan Wilson	2023
Katelyn Hoppers	2024

== Individual Records ==
Career Goals
Player	Years	Goals
Grace Yochum	2018–22	41
Yolanda Odenyo	2005–08	35
Jolene Schweitzer	2001–04	35
Siera Strawser	2006–09	32
Olyvia Dowell	2019-22	31
Courtney Dike	2013-16	31

Season Goals
Player	Year	Goals
Yolanda Odenyo	2008	16
Krista Lopez	2010	15
Robin Rampey	1996	15
Courtney Dike	2013	13
Siera Strawser	2008	13
Sally Holmes	1996	13

Career Assists
Player	Years	Assists
Nikki Wojtowicz	2001–04	51
Kasey Langdon	2006–09	27
Kim Rodriguez	2017-21	25
Andi Lute	1997–00	25
Jaci Jones	2016–19	24

Season Assists
Player	Year	Assists
Nikki Wojtowicz	2003	17
Kasey Langdon	2008	14
Anna Beffer	2017	13
Nikki Wojtowicz	2004	13
Jaci Jones	2019	12
Nikki Wojtowicz	2002	12

Career Points
Player	Years	Points
Grace Yochum	2018–22	91
Yolanda Odenyo	2005–08	90
Jolene Schweitzer	2001–04	84
Courtney Dike	2013-16	83
Adriane Radtke	2003–07	83

Season Points
Player	Year	Points
Yolanda Odenyo	2008	37
Kasey Langdon	2008	36
Krista Lopez	2010	35
Robin Rampey	1996	35
Siera Strawser	2008	33

Career Saves
Player	Years	Saves
Kat Doud	1999–02	336
Adrianna Franch	2009–12	325
Chrystal Emerson	1996–98	310
Michela Ongaro	2013, 2015-17	281
Erin Stigler	2005–08	197

Season Saves
Player	Year	Saves
Chrystal Emerson	1997	121
Kat Doud	2000	111
Logan Marks	2025	99
Chrystal Emerson	1998	98
Kat Doud	2001	97

== Notable alumni ==
Main page: Category:Oklahoma State Cowgirls soccer players

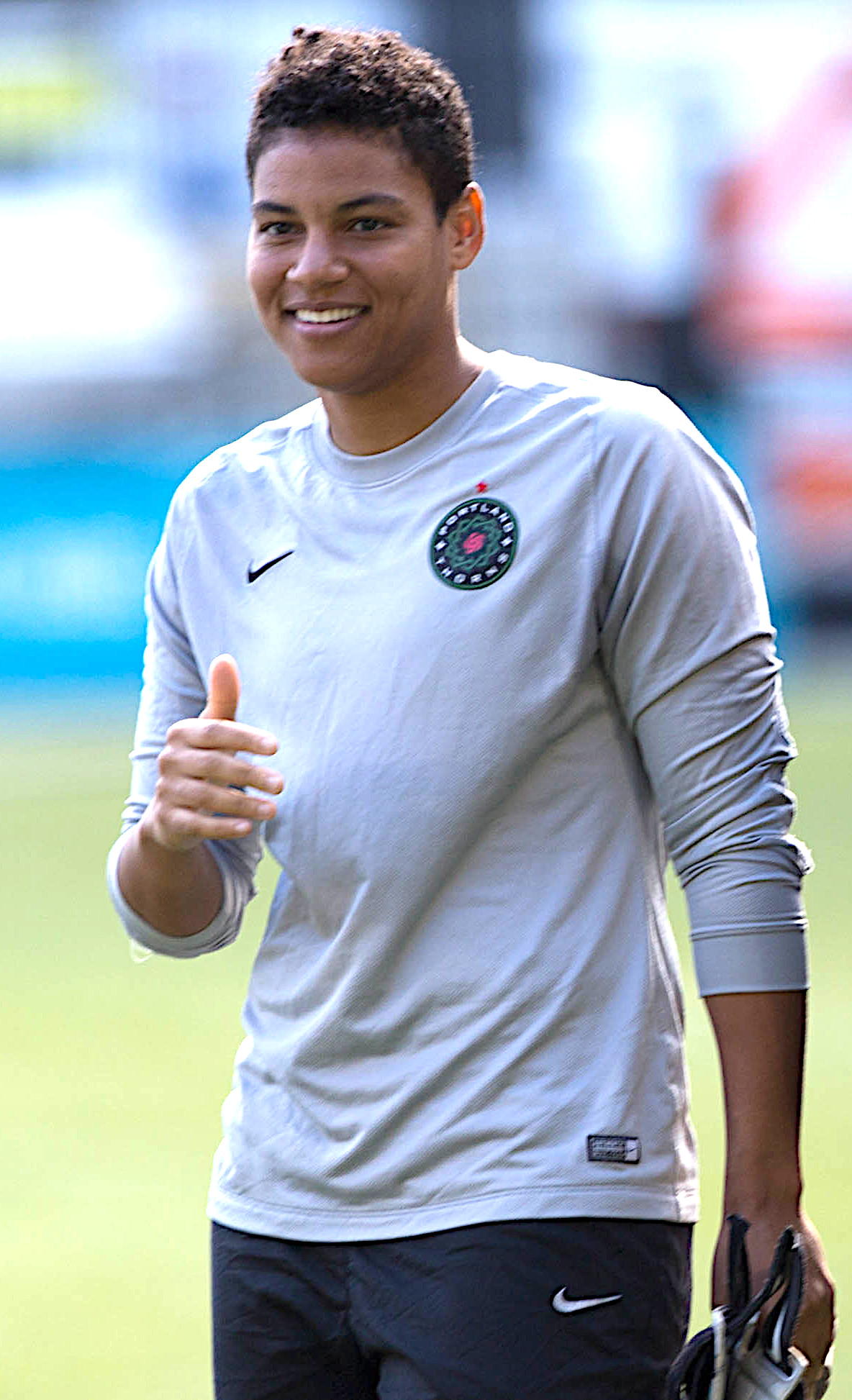
Former Oklahoma State goalkeeper Adrianna Franch

- Gabrella Coleman
- Courtney Dike
- Adrianna Franch
- Jaidy Gutiérrez
- Kathrin Lehmann
- Melinda Mercado
- Kimberly Rodríguez
- Coumba Sow
- Peyton Vincze
- Xcaret Pineda

== See also ==
- Oklahoma State Cowboys and Cowgirls
