= Iyassu Bekele =

Ethiopian footballer

Iyassu
Personal information
- Full name: Iyassu T. Bekele
- Date of birth: 17 May 1992 (age 34)
- Place of birth: Adis Abeba, Ethiopia
- Position: Midfielder

Team information
- Current team: FC Kaliakra Kavarna

Youth career
- 2008–2011: Arlington Travel Soccer Club
- 2008–2011: D.C. United

Senior career*
| Years | Team | Apps | (Gls) |
| 2012 | Nashville Metros | 15 | (3) |
| 2013–2014 | FC Dallas | 0 | (0) |
| 2015 | FC Wichita | 10 | (4) |
| 2016 | L.A. Stars | | |
| 2016 | Dedebit F.C. | 14 | (2) |
| 2017– | FC Kaliakra Kavarna | | |

International career^{‡}
| 2011 | Ethiopia | 2 | (0) |
- * Club domestic league appearances and goals as of 17 October 2013 ‡ National team caps and goals as of 29 January 2013

Iyassu Bekele (born 17 May 1992) is an Ethiopian footballer who plays as a midfielder for FC Kaliakra Kavarna of the Bulgarian North-East V AFG.

== Club career ==
Bekele started his career in the United States with Arlington Travel Soccer Club and played later for D.C. United. He studied on the University of Missouri–Kansas City, during this time played 212 for Nashville Metros and the U-23 of FC Dallas. On 1 May 2015 signed for National Premier Soccer League club FC Wichita. After leaving Wichita, played until June 2016 for L.A. Stars, in the Ethiopian Sports Federation in North America. After a half year with Dedebit F.C., signed in March 2017 for Bulgarian lower league club FC Kaliakra Kavarna.

== International career ==
Bekele is member of the Ethiopia national team. He played his debut on 12 November 2011 for Ethiopia in the FIFA World Cup qualification against the Somalia national football team.
