= Haleigh Stackpole =

American soccer player (born 2000)

Personal information
- Full name: Haleigh Kae Stackpole
- Date of birth: August 4, 2000 (age 26)
- Height: 5 ft 5 in (1.65 m)
- Position: Midfielder

Youth career
- CASL
- North Carolina Courage

College career
Years	Team	Apps	(Gls)
2018–2021	Ole Miss Rebels	81	(19)

Senior career*
Years	Team	Apps	(Gls)
2022	North Carolina Courage	0	(0)
2023	North Carolina Courage	0	(0)
2023–2024	Slavia Prague	22	(9)
- * Club domestic league appearances and goals as of 17:52, March 22, 2026 (UTC)

Haleigh Kae Stackpole (born August 4, 2000) is an American former professional soccer player who played as a midfielder. She played college soccer for the Ole Miss Rebels before being selected by the North Carolina Courage in the third round of the 2022 NWSL Draft. She has also played for SK Slavia Prague of the Czech Women's First League.

== Early life ==
Stackpole grew up in Bowling Green, Kentucky, before moving to Spring Lake, North Carolina later on in her youth. She played club soccer for ECNL side CASL before moving to the North Carolina Courage Academy at the under-19 level. In 2015 and 2016, she was invited to the Nike National Training Camp. Stackpole attended Overhills High School, where she was a three-time varsity letterwinner and helped the soccer team win one conference championship. She was a major offensive threat, recording 117 goals and 31 assists across her sophomore and junior seasons. 63 of her goals came in 2016, making Stackpole the second-highest single-season goalscorer in North Carolina High School Athletic Association history.

== College career ==
In Stackpole's collegiate debut for the Ole Miss Rebels in August 2018, she scored a goal to help Ole Miss earn a season-opening victory over Louisiana. Stackpole wet on to post a rookie season in which she started all 22 of the Rebels' matches, ranked second on the team in total minutes, and received a spot on the Southeastern Conference (SEC) All-Freshman team. She also assisted Grace Johnson's game-winner against Clemson in the first round of the NCAA tournament before later participating in the Rebels' second-round defeat to Stanford. As a sophomore in 2019, Stackpole continued to show consistency, only missing 3 minutes of play all season.

As a junior, Stackpole played every single minute of the season and was named to the All-Southeast region third team. Her 8 assists ranked third in the SEC. Stackpole's efforts helped Ole Miss reach the Sweet Sixteen of the NCAA tournament for the second time in history; some of her contributions included a converted spot-kick in the Rebels' penalty shootout victory over Bowling Green in the first round and both a goal and an assist against USC the following match. In her final year at Ole Miss, Stackpole was named to the All-SEC and All-Region second teams. She registered 16 assists, ranking third in the nation, and was second in the SEC in total goal contributions. In October 2021, she was named SEC Offensive Player of the Week, her third and final weekly conference honor of her career. Stackpole departed from Ole Miss with 31 assists, ranking third-highest in program history.

== Club career ==
=== North Carolina Courage ===
Stackpole was selected in the third round of the 2022 NWSL Draft (29th overall) by the North Carolina Courage, her former youth club. On February 7, 2022, the Courage announced that they had signed Stackpole to her first professional contract, a one-year deal with an option for an additional season. In May 2022, Stackpole was a member of the North Carolina squad that won the 2022 NWSL Challenge Cup after beating the Washington Spirit, 2–1. She did not make any competitive appearances for the Courage before being waived on August 10, 2022.

The following year, Stackpole returned to North Carolina. She signed a short-term national team replacement player contract with the club after multiple Courage players left to compete in the 2023 FIFA Women's World Cup. Once again, she did not see any professional minutes before she was released in August 2023.

=== Slavia Prague ===
Later in 2023, Stackpole joined Czech Women's First League club SK Slavia Prague. She appeared in all 8 of Slavia Prague's UEFA Women's Champions League matches, which included 2 qualifiers and 6 group stage games. On October 18, 2023, she scored in Slavia Prague's 6–0 qualifier second leg victory over Romanian champions FCU Olimpia Cluj. Stackpole returned to the club for the 2024–25 season, which Slavia Prague finished in second place. She scored 4 goals in her final 3 league games with the club, including a brace against Lokomotiva Brno in March 2024.

== Personal life ==
In 2024, Stackpole returned to her home state to enroll in the University of Kentucky College of Dentistry. On July 11, 2025, she married Justin Stone.

== Honors and awards ==
North Carolina Courage

- NWSL Challenge Cup: 2022

Individual

- Second-team All-SEC: 2021
- SEC All-freshman team: 2018
