= Melinda Mercado =

American soccer player

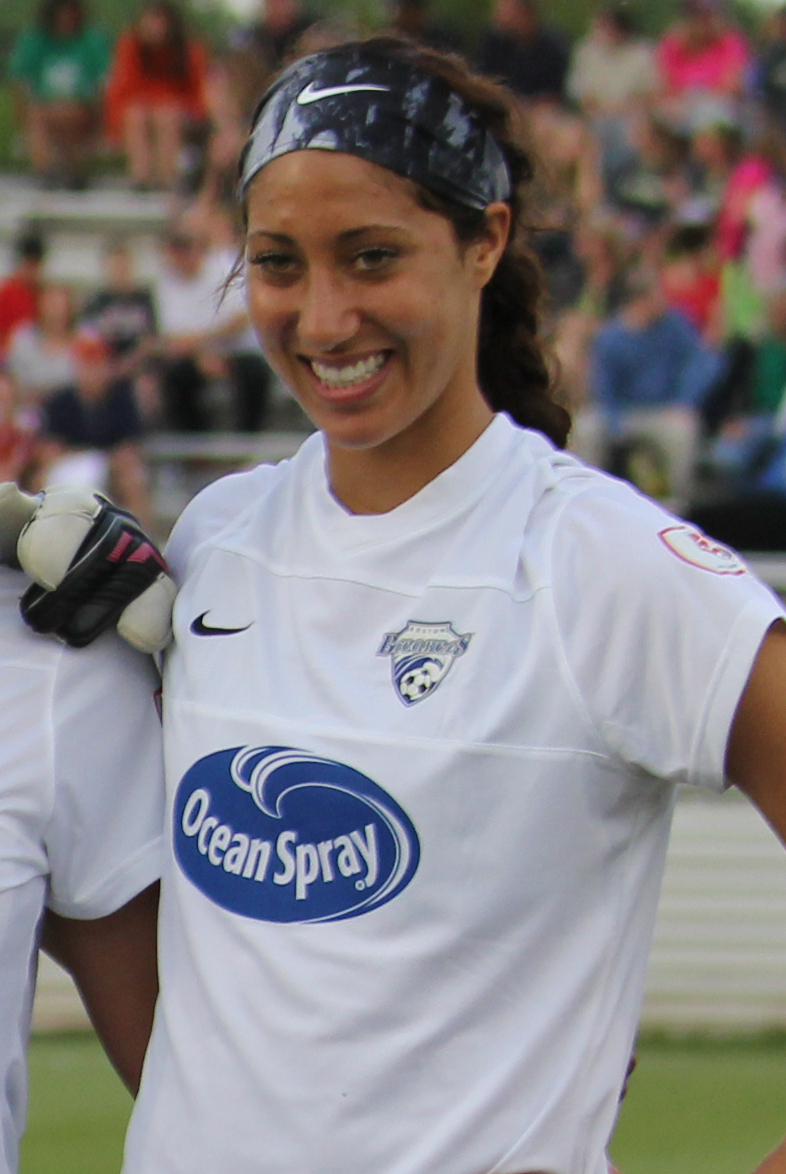

Personal information
- Full name: Melinda Mercado
- Date of birth: March 19, 1990 (age 36)
- Place of birth: Sapulpa, Oklahoma
- Height: 5 ft 10 in (1.78 m)
- Position: Defender

College career
Years	Team	Apps	(Gls)
2008–2011	Oklahoma State Cowgirls		

Senior career*
Years	Team	Apps	(Gls)
2013	Boston Breakers	1	(0)
- * Club domestic league appearances and goals

Melinda Mercado (born March 19, 1990) is a former American soccer defender who played for the Boston Breakers in the National Women's Soccer League.

== Early life ==
Raised in Sapulpa, Oklahoma, Mercado attended Sapulpa High School, where she was a two-sport star on both the soccer and basketball teams. She was named Sapulpa High School's Athlete of the Year in 2007 and 2008. As captain of the soccer team, she led the team with 11 goals and was named all-conference and all-district as a sophomore, junior and senior. She captained the team to a district title and earned all-state honors as a senior.

Mercado was a member of the Edmond Soccer Club '90 and helped lead the team twice as a national runner-up and two-time regional championship. She also played on the Oklahoma Olympic Development Program (ODP) team from 2004 to 2006.

=== Oklahoma State University ===
Mercado attended Oklahoma State University, where she played for the Cowgirls women's soccer team from 2008 to 2011. As a freshman in 2008, she was a key part of the defensive line that recorded 10 shutouts and allowed only 18 goals. She earned third-team Freshman All-America honors from Soccer Buzz, was named to the Soccer Buzz All-Freshman Central Region team as well as the Big 12 All-Newcomer Team. Mercado also played for the Cowgirls basketball team and made 29 appearances during the season. In 2009, she started all 23 games in which she appeared and was named to the All-Big 12 First Team as a defender. Mercado earned Defensive MVP honors at the Big 12 Soccer Championship and was an All-Central Region Second Team selection by the NSCAA. She was a key part of a defense that recorded a school-record 14 shoutouts and allowed just 16 goals. A multi-talented player, she recorded assists against Northwestern State and Kansas and scored goal in a match against Missouri. She also earned Academic All-Big 12 First Team honors. During her junior year, Mercado started all 26 games and was key to a defense that led the Big 12 Conference in goals against average (0.79) while allowing just 21 goals and recording 10 shutouts. Her 2,353 minutes played was the most by a Cowgirl. She was named the 2010 Big 12 Conference Defensive Player of the Year and was an NSCAA/Performance Subaru All-America Second Team selection as well as the TopDrawerSoccer.com Team of the Season Third Team. She earned All-Big 12 First Team honors for second-straight season and was named to the Big 12 Championship All-Tournament team where she was awarded the tournament's Defensive MVP award for the second consecutive year. Mercado was ranked among TopDrawerSoccer.com's National Top 100 Players to Watch and received NSACC All-Central Region First Team accolades.

== Playing career ==
=== Club ===
==== Boston Breakers ====
Mercado was drafted by the Boston Breakers in the 2012 WPS Draft; however, the WPS suspended operations before league play began.

In 2013, she signed as a free agent with the Western New York Flash for the inaugural season of the National Women's Soccer League (NWSL), but was traded a few months later to the Boston Breakers. She made her debut for the Breakers in a match against the Washington Spirit on May 11, 2013.

=== International ===
Mercado was a member of the United States under-20 women's national soccer team in 2009.
