= Courtney Dike =

Footballer

Personal information
- Full name: Courtney Ozioma Dike
- Date of birth: 3 February 1995 (age 31)
- Place of birth: Edmond, Oklahoma, United States
- Height: 1.68 m (5 ft 6 in)
- Position: Forward

College career
Years	Team	Apps	(Gls)
2013–2016	Oklahoma State Cowgirls	80	(30)

International career
2014	Nigeria U20	6	(2)
2015	Nigeria	3	(0)

Courtney Ozioma Dike (born 3 February 1995) is a former footballer who played as a forward. Born in the United States, she represented Nigeria at international level.

== College career ==
Born in Edmond, Oklahoma, Courtney attended Edmond North High School and played college soccer at Oklahoma State University. In her four years at Edmond North High School, she scored over 90 goals.

She studied accounting at Oklahoma State University and played for the Oklahoma State University women's soccer team.

== International career ==
In 2014, Courtney received a call up to represent the Nigerian U-20 national team for the 2014 FIFA U-20 Women's World Cup in Canada where she scored the fastest goal in the history of the competition after just 13 seconds in a match against North Korea. Her performance in the tournament earned her three nominations at the 2014 Nigeria Sports Award.

Courtney went on to represent Nigeria at the 2015 FIFA Women's World Cup, also in Canada. On 12 June 2015, she made history by becoming the first native Oklahoman to ever play in the World Cup after coming on as a substitute for Asisat Oshoala in a match against Australia.

== Personal life ==
She has two brothers, Bright and Daryl, and two sisters, Kimberly and Brittny. It was reported in the media that she rejected the bonus given to her for her role in the 2014 FIFA U-20 Women's World Cup. She explained in a letter sent to the Nigeria Football Federation that "I am delighted to play for Nigeria whenever called upon. I knew before leaving for the U-20 World Cup that I would not accept any bonuses. Acceptance of prize money is against NCAA regulations (the division 1 collegiate governing body) here in the US, so that is the main reason for rejecting it."

== Honours ==
Nigeria U20

- FIFA U-20 Women's World Cup Runner-up: 2014

Individual

- "All-City Player of the Year" (2013)
- Big 12 Conference Offensive Player of the Year: 2016
- Nigeria Sports Award Discovery of the Year: 2014
- Nigeria Sports Award Sports Woman of the Year: 2014 nomination
- Nigeria Sports Award Footballer (women) of the Year: 2014 nomination
