= Peyton Vincze =

American-Welsh footballer

Personal information
- Full name: Peyton Sophia Vincze
- Date of birth: 19 October 2000 (age 26)
- Place of birth: Wichita, Kansas, United States
- Height: 5 ft 7 in (1.70 m)
- Position: Forward

Youth career
- 2017–2019: FC Wichita

College career
Years	Team	Apps	(Gls)
2019–2022	Oklahoma State Cowgirls	8	(1)
2023	South Florida Bulls	17	(2)

International career^{‡}
2017	Wales U17	3	(1)
2017–2018	Wales	5	(0)
- ‡ National team caps and goals as of 09:38, 1 July 2019 (UTC)

Peyton Sophia Vincze (born 19 October 2000) is a former footballer who played as a forward. She played college soccer for the Oklahoma State Cowgirls and South Florida Bulls. Born in the United States, she represented the Wales women's national football team.

== Early life ==
Vincze was born in Kansas. Her mother had been born in Wrexham, Wales, but had moved to Canada at four months old before relocating to the United States in her twenties. Vincze attended Andover Summer Elementary School, where she won the Butler County spelling bee in 2012. She later attended Andover High School. In 2019, she was named to the Wichita Eagle's All-Metro Track and Field team. She began playing football at the age of three and has an older sister who also played football at youth level.

In 2017, Vincze joined FC Wichita following the team's founding as the only non-collegiate outdoor women's football team in Wichita. She made her debut in the Women's Premier Soccer League during a 4–2 victory over Texas Spars on 6 January 2018 and scored her first goal in her second appearance, a 2–0 win over Oklahoma City.

== College career ==
=== Oklahoma State ===
Vincze committed to play college soccer for the Oklahoma State Cowgirls at the age of 16. Signed as part of its 2019 recruiting class, Cowgirls coach Colin Carmichael described Vincze as "an athletic, aggressive, hard-working forward who leads the line by herself. She's strong, she's a handful who never quits and she's a tireless worker who is constantly looking to improve."

After redshirting her freshman season, Vincze made her debut for the Cowgirls in 2020, but sustained a season-ending injury in a match against the West Virginia Mountaineers. She then missed the 2021 season due to another anterior cruciate ligament injury. Vincze returned to the team in 2022, scoring with a chipped finish in an 4–0 win over the Missouri State Lady Bears; her only goal at collegiate level for the Cowgirls.

=== South Florida ===
In 2023, Vincze spent her senior season with the South Florida Bulls. During the season, she scored two goals – in an 5–1 win over the Alabama A&M Lady Bulldogs and in an 2–1 win over the Gonzaga Bulldogs. She also assisted twice for Anna Sutter, in a 13–0 win over the Florida College. Vincze then played in her first and only postseason tournament, before the Bulls were knocked out by the Florida Atlantic Owls.

== International career ==
Although born in the United States, Vincze represented Wales at international level, qualifying via her Welsh-born mother. Her eligibility only came to light during a training academy set up by Welsh side Swansea City in the U.S., with Vincze being ignorant of the fact that she qualified to play for the nation. Her first involvement with the Welsh side was at under-17 level, making her debut in an 8–1 defeat to Norway in March 2017. Five days later, she scored her first goal for her adopted nation with the winning strike in a 1–0 victory over Bosnia and Herzegovina.

Vincze made her debut for the Wales senior side on 11 June 2017 in a 1–0 defeat to Portugal as a second-half substitute. In October 2017, less than a year after discovering she was eligible to represent Wales, Vincze was named Football Association of Wales (FAW) Young Player of the Year. On 24 October, Vincze was named in the starting line-up in a goalless draw against Russia. On 31 August 2018, she made her final appearance for Wales, coming on as a second-half substitute in a 3–0 loss to England.

== Career statistics ==
=== College ===
Team	Season	NCAA Regular Season			Big 12 Tournament		NCAA Tournament		Total	
Team	Season	Division	Apps	Goals	Apps	Goals	Apps	Goals	Apps	Goals
Oklahoma State Cowgirls	2020	Div. I	3	0	–	–	–	–	3	0
Oklahoma State Cowgirls	2021	Div. I	–	–	–	–	–	–	–	–
Oklahoma State Cowgirls	2022	Div. I	5	1	0	0	0	0	5	1
Total			8	1	0	0	0	0	8	1
Team	Season	NCAA Regular Season			AAC Tournament		NCAA Tournament		Total	
Team	Season	Division	Apps	Goals	Apps	Goals	Apps	Goals	Apps	Goals
South Florida Bulls	2023	Div. I	17	2	1	0	0	0	18	2

=== International ===
Statistics accurate as of match played 31 August 2018.

Appearances and goals by national team and year
National team	Year	Apps	Goals
Wales	2017	4	0
Wales	2018	1	0
Total		5	0

== Honours ==
Individual

- FAW Young Player of the Year: 2017
- Academic All-Big 12 First Team: 2020–21
