= Mauricio Vargas =

Costa Rican footballer (born 1992)

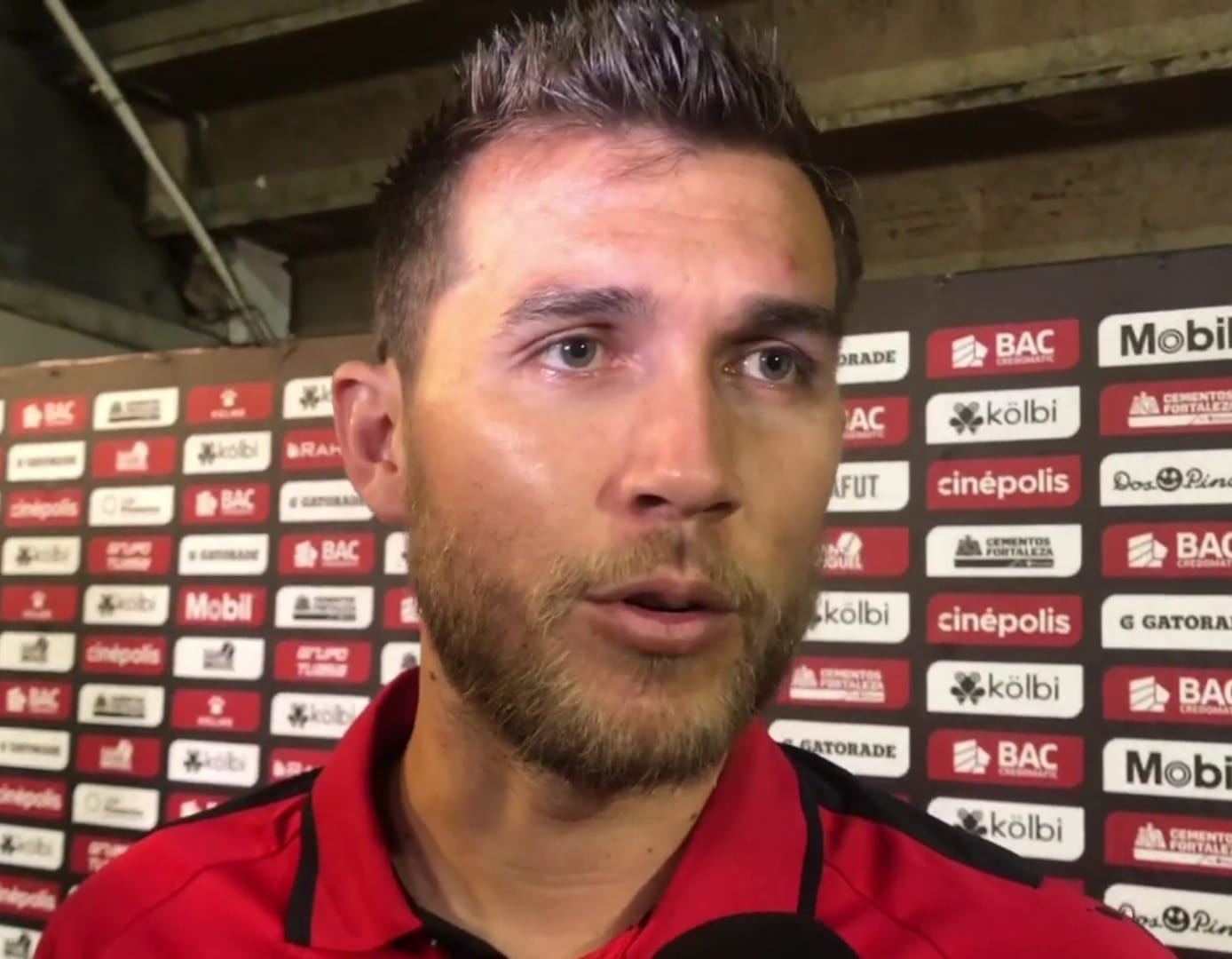
- 2020

Personal information
- Full name: Mauricio José Vargas Campos
- Date of birth: 10 August 1992 (age 34)
- Place of birth: Somerville, New Jersey, United States
- Height: 6 ft 3 in (1.91 m)
- Position: Goalkeeper

Team information
- Current team: Friends Falcons (GK coach); Wichita (GK coordinator)

Youth career
- 2002–2010: Alajuelense
- 2010–2012: Albacete

College career
Years	Team	Apps	(Gls)
2012–2015	Barton Cougars		
2015–2016	Friends Falcons	16	(0)

Senior career*
Years	Team	Apps	(Gls)
2015	Wichita	14	(0)
2016	Pittsburgh Riverhounds	12	(0)
2016–2021	Alajuelense	40	(0)
2016	→ Carmelita (loan)	0	(0)
2022	Herediano	0	(0)
2022	→ Guanacasteca (loan)	21	(0)

International career
2009	Costa Rica U17	3	(0)
2011	Costa Rica U20	8	(0)

Managerial career
- 2022–: Friends Falcons (GK coach)
- 2022–: Wichita (GK coordinator)
- * Club domestic league appearances and goals

Mauricio "Mau" Vargas (born 10 August 1992) is a Costa Rican professional football coach and a former player. He works as a goalkeeping coach with American team Friends Falcons and a goalkeeping coordinator with FC Wichita.

== Early life ==
Vargas was born in Somerville, New Jersey but moved to Alajuela, Costa Rica with his family when he was very young. He moved back to the New Jersey in his teens. He has four siblings including brothers Juan Pablo who also plays professional soccer and Mario who currently plays for CF Universidad de Costa Rica.

== Club career ==
After moving to Costa Rica, Vargas played outfield positions for the academy of Liga Deportiva Alajuelense beginning at age 9 before becoming a goalkeeper at age 13. In 2010, he left Alajuelense and joined the academy of Albacete Balompié of the Spanish Segunda División before announcing his departure in April 2012.

At this time Vargas returned to the United States and played college soccer for the Cougars of Barton Community College. He played for the team for three years before transferring to Friends University in Wichita, Kansas and playing for its team. He graduated with a degree in physical education in 2016. During his lone season on the team, he made 16 appearances and maintained a GAA of 1.049. While at Friends University, he also played for FC Wichita of the National Premier Soccer League for the 2015 season. During the season, he made 14 appearances for the club, as he recorded 6 shutouts and maintained a .79 goals against average. That season, he also helped FC Wichita claim the NPSL South Central Conference title in the club's inaugural season. Following the season, various teams inquired about signing the player including Major League Soccer clubs Columbus Crew SC, D.C. United, FC Dallas, and Sporting Kansas City.

In December 2015 it was announced that Vargas had signed his first professional contract, joining the Pittsburgh Riverhounds of the United Soccer League. He made his professional debut for the club on 14 May 2016 in a 0–1 defeat to FC Cincinnati in front of a crowd of 23,375, a league record at that time. His performance in the match, which included saving eight of nine shots faced, earned Vargas USL Team of the Week honors.

== International career ==
Vargas first had national team involvement with the Costa Rican youth teams at age 14. He went on to represent Costa Rica at the 2009 FIFA U-17 World Cup and the 2011 FIFA U-20 World Cup. He played every minute of every match of both tournaments. He was called into the Under-23 team in summer 2015 even though he was not of age to compete with the team. He also appeared in five matches for Costa Rica during the 2011 CONCACAF U-20 Championship.

== Career statistics ==
As of 22 May 2016

Club	League	Division	Season	League		Cup		Continental		Total	
Club	League	Division	Season	Apps	Goals	Apps	Goals	Apps	Goals	Apps	Goals
FC Wichita	NPSL	IV	2015	14	0	0	0	0	0	14	0
Pittsburgh Riverhounds	USL	III	2016	8	0	1	0	0	0	9	0
Career total				22	0	1	0	0	0	23	0

== Honours ==
Alajuelense

- Liga FPD: Apertura 2020
- CONCACAF League: 2020
