= Taylor Ziemer =

American association football player (born 1998)

Personal information
- Full name: Taylor Marie Ziemer
- Date of birth: July 16, 1998 (age 28)
- Place of birth: Santa Rosa, California, United States
- Height: 5 ft 9 in (1.75 m)
- Position: Midfielder

Team information
- Current team: 1. FC Köln
- Number: 18

Youth career
- –2016: Santa Rosa United

College career
Years	Team	Apps	(Gls)
2016–2018	Virginia Cavaliers	45	(12)
2019–2020	Texas A&M Aggies	38	(8)

Senior career*
Years	Team	Apps	(Gls)
2018–2019	ADO Den Haag	21	(5)
2021–2023	Breiðablik	51	(9)
2023–2024	Twente	20	(9)
2024–	1. FC Köln	28	(5)

International career
2012	United States U14		
2013	United States U15		
2016	United States U18		
2018	United States U19		
- * Club domestic league appearances and goals as of 11 October 2026

Taylor Marie Ziemer (born July 16, 1998) is an American soccer player who plays as a midfielder for 1. FC Köln. She has represented the United States at the U14, U15, U18, and U19 levels.

== Early life ==
Ziemer attended and graduated from Montgomery High School. As a youth player, she played in the NorCal Premier Soccer Player Development Program.

== Youth career ==
Ziemer started her youth career with local side Santa Rosa United playing predominantly as a forward and on occasion in midfield. She is a two-time Gatorade National Player of the Year.

== College career ==
=== Virginia Cavaliers ===
In 2016 she signed a letter of intent to play in NCAA Division I with University of Virginia. She represented the Cavaliers 45 times over two seasons, registering 12 goals and 8 assists before joining ADO Den Haag in the Netherlands to play professionally.

=== Texas A&M Aggies ===
Having played the 2018–19 season with ADO, she returned to the United States, transferring to Texas A&M where she made 38 appearances across two seasons, including 8 goals and 4 assists from midfield.

== Senior career ==
=== ADO Den Haag ===
Ziemer agreed to join ADO Den Haag for the 2018–19 season in the women's Eredivisie. She appeared in 21 games as a midfielder, making 10 starts. Ziemer scored 5 times, including a goal against Ajax.

=== Breiðablik ===
In 2021. Ziemer agreed to join Breiðablik in the Úrvalsdeild kvenna, the top women's football league in Iceland. She played in the 2021–22 UEFA Women's Champions League where Breiðablik were drawn in Group B against Paris Saint-Germain, Real Madrid and Zhytlobud-1 Kharkiv. She made twenty-eight appearances and scored six goals in her first year in Iceland.

Going into the 2022–23 UEFA Women's Champions League season, Breiðablik were knocked out in the qualifying stages against Rosenborg on aggregate, with Ziemer playing in both legs.

In her three years in Iceland, she scored 9 goals in 51 domestic league matches. She had one goal in international cup matches.

=== Twente ===
Ziemer returned to the Eredivisie, joining FC Twente in September 2023. In her first season with Twente, she scored 9 goals, which tied for eighth-most in the league.

Ziemer also scored a goal in a 2023–24 UEFA Women's Champions League qualifying round match against BK Häcken on October 11, 2023, though Twente lost the matchup on aggregate goals.

=== 1. FC Köln ===
German club 1. FC Köln announced it signed Ziemer to a one-year contract on May 30, 2024.

== Media ==
Ziemer featured in the February 2019 edition of the ADO Den Haag Post where she discussed her journey from The U.S to The Netherlands in an interview alongside fellow American Johnny Reynolds.

== International career ==
She has represented the United States at youth level.

Ziemer is also eligible to represent Germany.

== Style of play ==
Ziemer can operate as a midfielder or forward.

== Personal life ==
Ziemer identifies as a feminist, having majored in gender studies during college.

She is the daughter of coach Marcus Ziemer, the coach of the Sonoma State Seawolves men's soccer team. She is the great-granddaughter of Pro Football Hall of Famer Bob St. Clair.

== Honors ==
Breiðablik

- Icelandic Cup: 2021
- Úrvalsdeild kvenna runner-up: 2021
- Icelandic Women's Football Super Cup runner-up: 2022

Individual

- 2014 Gatorade National Player of the Year: 2014, 2015
- 2015 NSCAA Youth All American
