= Grace Yochum =

American soccer player (born 1999)

Personal information
- Full name: Grace Marie Yochum
- Date of birth: December 29, 1999 (age 26)
- Height: 5 ft 10 in (1.78 m)
- Position: Attacking midfielder

Team information
- Current team: Oklahoma State Cowgirls (assistant coach)

Youth career
- Albion Hurricanes

College career
Years	Team	Apps	(Gls)
2018–2022	Oklahoma State Cowgirls	86	(41)

Managerial career
- 2024–: Oklahoma State Cowgirls (assistant)

Grace Marie Yochum (born December 29, 1999) is an American soccer coach and former player who is currently an assistant coach for the Oklahoma State Cowgirls. She played five years of college soccer for the Cowgirls, earning second-team All-American honors in 2022, before being selected by the Chicago Red Stars in the first round of the 2023 NWSL Draft.

== Early life ==
Yochum grew up in Houston, Texas. She started playing soccer with the YMCA at age 4. She eventually joined ECNL club Albion Hurricanes in third grade and competed with the club through high school, playing across the United States and at events in Europe. Yochum attended Memorial High School, where she played both soccer and basketball. With the soccer team, she was a four-time all-district honoree and set a program record with 45 assists. As a senior, she was a key part of Memorial's state championship run, scoring goals in both the state semifinal and final to secure the title. She received All-State MVP and All-USA third team honors for her performances. With the basketball team, Yochum set a program record for steals and received another set of four all-district honors. She was also a McDonald's All-American nominee and a one-time district Offensive Player of the Year.

== College career ==
As a high school sophomore, Yochum committed to Mississippi State University. However, a few months later, a coaching change for the Bulldogs resulted in Yochum's scholarship getting retracted. She instead ended up playing college soccer for the Oklahoma State Cowgirls, spending five seasons and setting a program record with 41 goals. As a freshman in 2018, she played in all 18 of the Sooners' matches, starting all but one. She scored her first collegiate goal on September 2, 2018, at Loyola Chicago. She was named to the All-Big 12 freshman team at the end of the season. The following year, Yochum earned All-Big 12 first team and All-Midwest second team honors after helping the Cowgirls win the Big 12 regular season title. Despite missing the final 6 games of the season due to a collarbone injury, she ranked fifth in the conference with 11 goals. In October 2018, she was named Big 12 Offensive Player of the Week after scoring four goals in one weekend.

Yochum scored 12 goals as a junior, the highest in the Big 12 and the sixth-most in the nation; Her 8 game-winners ranked first across the NCAA. She was named second-team All-Big 12 and third-team All-Midwest. As a senior in the fall of 2021, Yochum stepped it up a notch, now earning first-team All-Big 12 and second-team All-Midwest honors. She returned for a fifth year in 2022 and capped off her college career by being named to the All-American second team in addition to the All-Big 12 first team.

== Club career ==
Yochum was selected by the Chicago Red Stars in the first round of the 2023 NWSL Draft (14th overall). She became the third Oklahoma State player to be drafted into the National Women's Soccer League. However, Yochum was not able to report to the Red Stars' preseason roster due to personal health reasons; due to recurrent injuries she had suffered in college, playing professionally would no longer be an option for her.

== Coaching career ==
Yochum received a minor in coaching science at Oklahoma State University. In July 2023, she joined her former college team, the Cowgirls, as a player development coordinator, a role in which she mentored incoming freshmen and first-year players on the team. On February 26, 2024, Yochum became one of Oklahoma State's three assistant coaches under Colin Carmichael.

== Honors and awards ==
Oklahoma State Cowgirls

- Big 12 Conference: 2019

Individual

- Second-team All-American: 2022
- First-team All-Big 12: 2019, 2021, 2022
- Second-team All-Big 12: 2020
- All-Big 12 freshman team: 2018
