= Chiara Hahn =

German footballer (born 2002)

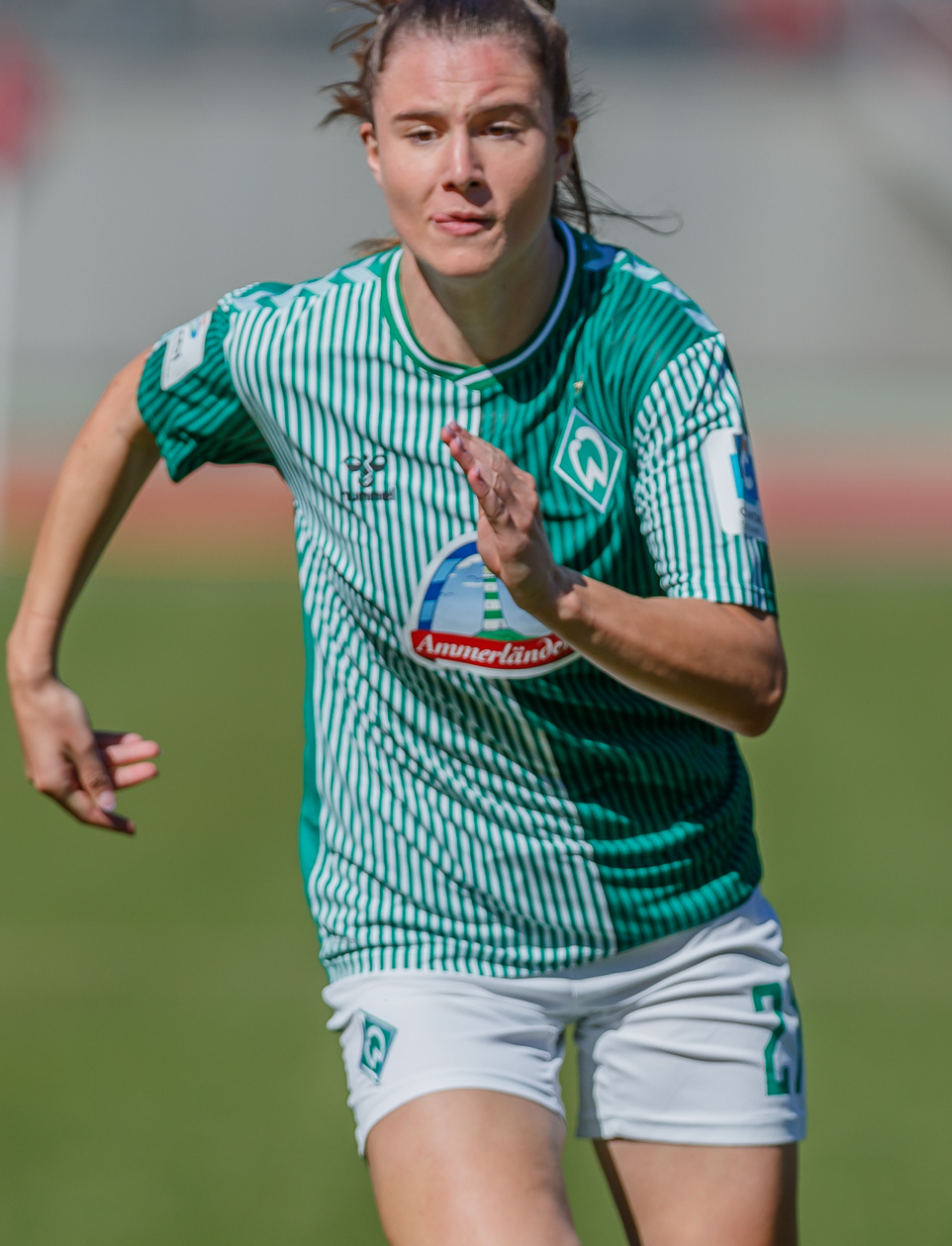
- Hahn with Werder Bremen in 2023

Personal information
- Full name: Chiara Marie Hahn
- Date of birth: 2 January 2002 (age 24)
- Place of birth: Lauterbach, Hesse, Germany
- Height: 1.77 m (5 ft 10 in)
- Position: Midfielder

Team information
- Current team: TSG Hoffenheim
- Number: 23

Youth career
- Eintracht Frankfurt

College career
Years	Team	Apps	(Gls)
2020-2022	South Florida Bulls	40	(6)

Senior career*
Years	Team	Apps	(Gls)
2018–2020	1. FFC Frankfurt II	34	(9)
2020	1. FFC Frankfurt	1	(0)
2023–2024	Werder Bremen	28	(0)
2024–	TSG Hoffenheim	40	(4)

International career^{‡}
2016–2017	Germany U15	4	(1)
2017–2018	Germany U16	5	(1)
2018	Germany U17	2	(0)
2020	Germany U19	3	(0)
2025–	Germany U23	1	(0)
- * Club domestic league appearances and goals as of 14 November 2026 ‡ National team caps and goals as of 8 March 2026

Chiara Hahn (born 2 January 2002) is a German footballer who plays as a midfielder for Frauen-Bundesliga club TSG Hoffenheim.
