= FC Wichita =

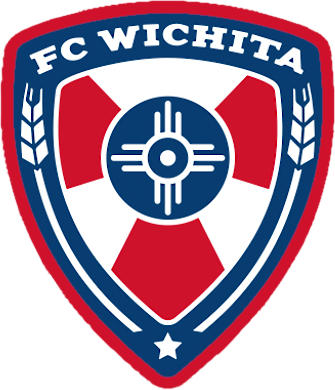
- Full name: Football Club Wichita
- Founded: 2013; 13 years ago
- Stadium: Stryker Soccer Complex; Wichita, Kansas
- Capacity: 6,100
- Head Coach: Mauricio Vargas
- League: The League for Clubs
- 2025: 3rd of Central Region, MAC (not qualified)
- Website: fcwichita.com
Home colors	Away colors

FC Wichita is a soccer club based in Wichita, Kansas that plays in The League for Clubs's Central Region. Previously a member of the National Premier Soccer League, FC Wichita played joined the USL League Two in 2021 and played there until the 2023 season. For the 2025 season, FC Wichita joined the inaugural season of The League for Clubs, an amateur league associated with the Women's Premier Soccer League.

On January 7, 2017, FC Wichita announced the creation of a women's team. The team played in the WPSL before joining the United Women's Soccer League for the 2021 and 2022 seasons. After an independent season in 2023, the team returned to the WPSL and in 2025 joined the professional league WPSL PRO.

On January 19, 2021, FC Wichita announced it was joining USL League Two after five seasons In the NPSL. After not playing in the USL League Two in 2024, the team announced it was joining the new amateur soccer league The League for Clubs.

== Stadium ==
FC Wichita played its home matches from 2015 to 2017 seasons on the 2,200 capacity Tommy Peckham Championship Field at Stryker Soccer Complex in Wichita, Kansas.

For the 2018 season, FC Wichita was forced to relocate for one season to Trinity Academy. Stryker Soccer Complex underwent a $22 million renovation.

FC Wichita returned to Stryker Stadium for their season opener on May 25, 2019. The updated Stryker Stadium seats more than 6,000 fans.

== Men's Year-by-Year ==
Year	League	GP	W	L	D	GF	GA	GD	PTS	Regular season	Playoffs	U.S. Open Cup
2015	NPSL	14	11	3	0	35	11	+24	33	1st, South Central	Region Semifinal	Did not qualify
2016	NPSL	12	9	2	1	31	11	+20	28	3rd, South Central	South Central Conference Semifinal	1st round
2017	NPSL	10	8	1	1	27	11	+16	25	1st, Heartland	South Region Semifinal	2nd round
2018	NPSL	10	7	2	1	24	11	+13	22	1st, Heartland	Heartland Conference Final	3rd round
2019	NPSL	10	2	3	5	15	15	0	11	5th, Heartland	Did not qualify	Did not qualify
2020	FC Wichita did not compete competitively in a league due to COVID-19.											
2021	USL2	11	0	11	0	5	30	–25	0	6th, Heartland	Did not qualify	Did not qualify
2022	USL2	14	6	7	1	23	30	–9	19	5th, Heartland	Did not qualify	Did not qualify
2023	USL2	12	4	8	0	22	28	-6	12	5th, Heartland	Did not qualify	Did not qualify
2024	FC Wichita did not compete competitively in a league.											
2025	TLC	10	2	5	3	11	17	-6	9	3rd, Mid–American	Did not qualify	Did not qualify
2026	FC Wichita did not compete competitively in a league.											

== Men's Honors ==
2015

- NPSL South Central conference champions
- Lamar Hunt US Open Cup berth
- NPSL Staples “Make More Happen” Goal of the Year – Kevin Ten Eyck
- All-NPSL first team – Kevin Ten Eyck & Matt Clare
- 2015 NPSL Supporters XI First Team – Kevin Ten Eyck & Matt Clare
- Mitre National Player of the Week for week 12 of the NPSL – Matt Clare

2016

- 2016 NPSL Staples “Make More Happen” Goal of the Year – Mark Weir
- 201 Lamar Hunt US Open Cup berth
- 2016 All-Conference First Team – Kevin Ten Eyck, James Togbah, Leo Sosa
- 2016 All-Conference Honorable Mention – Jeffrey Kyei, Richard Osterloh
- 2016 NPSL Showcase Invitation – James Togbah

2017

- 2017 Heartland Conference champions
- 2017 Heartland Conference tournament champions
- 2017 Lamar Hunt US Open Cup berth
- Mitre National Player of the Week for week 16 of the NPSL - Matt Clare
- 2017 All-Conference first team – Deri Corfe, James Togbah, Mark Weir
- 2017 All-Conference honorable mention – Matt Clare, Leo Sosa

2018

- 2018 US Open Cup round 3 – Wins over OKC Energy U-23 & Tulsa Roughnecks (now FC Tulsa).
- 2018 Heartland Conference champions
- 2018 All-Conference first team – Nelson Landaverde, Leo Sosa, Uzi Tayou, James Togbah
- 2018 All-Conference honorable mention – Franck Tayou, Thomas Wells, Mark Weir

2019

- 2019 All-conference first team — Thomas Wells

2020No awards due to no league in 2020.

== Head coaches ==
Larry Inlow was named the first manager for the club in September 2014.

- Larry Inlow (2015)
- John Markey (2016)
- Steve Ralos (2017)
- Blake Shumaker (2018–2019)
- Bryan Perez (2019–2021)
- Gonzalo Carranza (2022-2023)
- Mauricio Vargas (2025–Present)

== FC Wichita Women ==
As stated above, the FC Wichita women were announced as the first professional women's club in Wichita first competing in the Women's Premier Soccer League from 2017 through 2019.

Inlow introduced University of Kansas alum, Whitney Berry; Northern Iowa's Jami Reichenberger; Oklahoma State's Peyton Vincze; and Kansas State's Brookelynn Entz, who at the time was a high school player for Newton High.

On January 18, 2021, FC Wichita announced they would join the United Women's Soccer League.

After not playing in a league for the 2023 season, FC Wichita returned to the WPSL for the 2024 season. In 2025, FC Wichita will field a professional team in the newly formed WPSL PRO, and will be one of the 12 inaugural teams taking part.

== Women's Year-by-Year ==
Year	League	GP	W	L	D	GF	GA	GD	PTS	Regular season	Playoffs
2017	WPSL	11	6	4	1	30	15	+15	19	3rd, Heartland	Did not qualify
2018	WPSL	9	4	4	1	19	13	+6	13	4th, Heartland	Did not qualify
2019	WPSL	11	3	8	0	18	27	−9	10	5th, Heartland	Did not qualify
2020	FC Wichita did not compete competitively in a league due to COVID-19.										
2021	UWS	8	4	3	1	12	12	0	13	3rd, Central Conference	Did not qualify
2022	UWS	8	5	2	1	17	7	+10	16	2nd, Central Conference	Did not qualify
2023	Independent	3	3	0	3	20	3	+17	n/a	None	
2024	WPSL	10	4	6	0	15	17	−2	12	5th, Heartland	Did not qualify
2025	WPSL	10	3	4	3	9	19	−10	12	4th, Heartland	Did not qualify
2026	WPSL	10	1	9	0	8	38	−30	3	6th, Heartland	Did not qualify

== Women's Head coaches ==
Inlow announced in the introductory press conference Hutchinson Community College women's soccer head coach, Sammy Lane, would lead the inaugural season for FC Wichita.

- Sammy Lane (2017-2018)
- Gonzalo Carranza (2019-2021)
- Ashley Cordeiro (2022)
- Kieran Laking (2023)
