= Neal Patterson Stadium =

Soccer stadium in Stillwater, Oklahoma

- Interactive map of Neal Patterson Stadium
- Full name: Neal Patterson Stadium
- Address: 398 W. Hall of Fame Ave., Stillwater, OK 74075
- Coordinates: 36°7′43″N 97°4′36″W
- Owner: Oklahoma State University
- Operator: Oklahoma State University
- Capacity: 2,500
- Type: Soccer-specific stadium
- Record attendance: 4,122 (2018)

Construction
- Opened: 1996
- Renovated: 2018

Tenant
- Oklahoma State Cowgirls soccer

Website
- https://okstate.com/sports/womens-soccer

Neal Patterson Stadium is a soccer-specific stadium on the campus of Oklahoma State University in Stillwater, Oklahoma. The stadium hosts the Oklahoma State women's soccer team. The facility opened in 1996, and dedicated 2018. A $20 million project, the stadium is named for its major benefactor and Oklahoma State alumnus, the late Neal Patterson.

The current capacity since the 2018 renovation is 2,500.
