= 2018 SEC women's soccer tournament =

- Classification: Division I
- Teams: 10
- Matches: 9
- Site: Orange Beach Sportsplex; Orange Beach, Alabama
- Champions: LSU (1st title)
- Winning coach: Brian Lee (1st title)
- MVP: Caroline Brockmeier (LSU)
- Broadcast: SEC Network

2018 SEC women's soccer standings
	Conf.						Overall
Team	W		L		T	PCT	W		L		T	PCT
No. 13 Vanderbilt ‍†‍‍^{y}	8	–	1	–	1	.850	15	–	3	–	1	.816
No. 10 Tennessee ‍‍‍^{y}	7	–	2	–	1	.750	14	–	2	–	1	.853
Arkansas ‍‍‍^{y}	6	–	3	–	1	.650	14	–	4	–	3	.738
Ole Miss ‍‍‍^{y}	6	–	3	–	1	.650	12	–	7	–	1	.625
No. 18 South Carolina ‍‍‍^{y}	6	–	3	–	1	.650	14	–	5	–	1	.725
No. 16 Texas A&M ‍‍‍^{y}	6	–	3	–	1	.650	15	–	4	–	1	.775
No. 19 LSU ‍‍‡‍^{y}	5	–	4	–	1	.550	13	–	6	–	3	.659
Florida ‍‍‍	4	–	4	–	2	.500	7	–	10	–	4	.429
Auburn ‍‍‍^{y}	4	–	5	–	1	.450	12	–	6	–	2	.650
Missouri ‍‍‍	3	–	6	–	1	.350	6	–	11	–	2	.368
Alabama ‍‍‍	2	–	6	–	2	.300	8	–	8	–	3	.500
Mississippi State ‍‍‍^{y}	2	–	6	–	2	.300	9	–	7	–	2	.556
Georgia ‍‍‍	1	–	6	–	3	.250	4	–	9	–	5	.361
Kentucky ‍‍‍	1	–	9	–	0	.100	5	–	14	–	0	.263
† – Conference champion ‡ – 2018 SEC Tournament champion y – Invited to the NCAA tournament As of November 13, 2018; Rankings from United Soccer Coaches Poll; Source: SEC

The 2018 SEC women's soccer tournament was the postseason women's soccer tournament for the SEC. The Texas A&M Aggies were the defending champions, but they were eliminated from the 2018 tournament with a 2–1 loss to the South Carolina Gamecocks in the quarterfinals. The LSU Tigers won the tournament title via a penalty kick shootout win over the Arkansas Razorbacks in the final. This was the first SEC women's soccer tournament title for LSU, and the first for coach Brian Lee.

== Qualification ==
The top ten teams earned a berth into the SEC Tournament. The tournament is held at Orange Beach Sportsplex in Orange Beach, Alabama.

== Bracket ==
First round Sunday, October 28
7	LSU	3^{2OT}
10	Missouri	2
8	Florida	1 (2)
9	Auburn	1 (1)

Quarterfinals; Tuesday, October 30
2	Tennessee	1 (6)
7	LSU	1 (7)
3	Texas A&M	1
6	South Carolina	2
1	Vanderbilt	0
8	Florida	1
4	Arkansas	4
5	Ole Miss	0

Semifinals; Friday, November 2
7	LSU	1
6	South Carolina	0
8	Florida	0
4	Arkansas	1^{OT}

Championship; Sunday, November 4
7	LSU	1 (4)
4	Arkansas	1 (1)

== Schedule ==
All matches are played at Orange Beach Sportsplex in Orange Beach, Alabama.

=== First Round ===
October 12, 2018	#7 LSU	3–2 (a.e.t.)	#10 Missouri	Orange Beach, Alabama
1:00 p.m. CST	Alex Thomas 3', 79', 103'; Chrissy Pitre (yellow card) 92'	Report	Momola Adesanmi (yellow card) 35'; Julissa Cisneros 36', 84' (pen.)	Stadium: Orange Beach Sportsplex; Referee: Becky Pagan; Assistant referees: Craig Lowry; Jennifer Politz; Fourth official: Gus St. Silva

October 28, 2018	#8 Florida	1–1 (a.e.t.) (2–1 p)	#9 Auburn	Orange Beach, Alabama
3:30 p.m. CST	Madison Alexander 19' (pen.); Sarah Troccoli (red card) 56'	Report	Sarah Le Beau (yellow card) 19'; Team (yellow card) 19'; Gessie Gerow (yellow card) 41'; Taylor Troutman 73'	Stadium: Orange Beach Sportsplex; Referee: Jonathan Weeiner; Assistant referees: Kate Wasiak; Kalili Terry; Fourth official: Jennifer Politz
	Penalties
	Kaylan Marckese (penalty scored); Georgia Eaton-Collins (penalty missed); Tess Sapone (penalty scored); Madison Alexander (penalty missed)		Bri Folds (penalty missed); Treva Aycock (penalty missed); Angeline Daly (penalty missed); Gianna Montini (penalty scored); Rocio Sanders (penalty missed)

=== Quarterfinals ===
October 30, 2018	#2 Tennessee	1–1 (a.e.t.) (6–7 p)	#7 LSU	Orange Beach, Alabama
12:00 p.m. CST	Meghan Flynn (yellow card) 25'; Bunny Shaw 86'	Report	Shannon Cooke 51'	Stadium: Orange Beach Sportsplex; Referee: Karen Abt; Assistant referees: Craigh Lowry; Kate Wasiak; Fourth official: Gus St. Silva
	Penalties
	Katie Cousins (penalty scored); Anna Bialczak (penalty scored); Bunny Shaw (penalty scored); Mackenzie Gouner (penalty missed); Maya Neal (penalty scored); Shae Yanez (penalty missed); Rylie O'Keefe (penalty scored); Salera Jordan (penalty scored); Brice McInroy (penalty missed)		Alex Thomas (penalty scored); Adrienne Richardson (penalty scored); Marlena Cutura (penalty missed); Abbey Newton (penalty scored); Lucy Parker (penalty scored); Chrissy Pitre (penalty missed); Tinaya Alexander (penalty scored); Shannon Cooke (penalty scored); Meghan Johnson (penalty scored)

October 30, 2018	#3 Texas A&M	1–2	#6 South Carolina	Orange Beach, Alabama
2:30 p.m. CST	Emily Bates 17'	Report	Lauren Chang 18'; Jyllissa Harris (yellow card) 26'; Luciana Zullo 52'	Stadium: Orange Beach Sportsplex; Referee: Elvis Mahumutovic; Assistant referees: Alicia Messer; Kaili Terry; Fourth official: Gus St. Silva

October 30, 2018	#1 Vanderbilt	0–1	#8 Florida	Orange Beach, Alabama
5:00 p.m. CST		Report	Madison Alexander 6'	Stadium: Orange Beach Sportsplex; Referee: Ceciah Valero; Assistant referees: Craig Lowry; Jennifer Politz; Fourth official: Becky Pagan

October 30, 2018	#4 Arkansas	4–0	#5 Ole Miss	Orange Beach, Alabama
7:30 p.m. CST	Tori Cannata 2'; Own goal 4' (o.g.); Taylor Malham 7'; Channing Foster (yellow card) 45'; Reece Christopherson 58'; Mary Kate Smith (yellow card) 86'	Report		Stadium: Orange Beach Sportsplex; Referee: Mike Dee; Assistant referees: Alicia Messer; Kate Wasiak; Fourth official: Gus St. Silva

=== Semifinals ===
November 2, 2018	#8 Florida	0–1 (a.e.t.)	#4 Arkansas	Orange Beach, Alabama
12:00 p.m. CST	Sammie Betters (yellow card) 74'	Report	Abbi Neece (yellow card) 39'; Kayla McKeon 91'	Stadium: Orange Beach Sportsplex; Referee: Corey Rockwell; Assistant referees: Craig Lowry; Sam Bilbo; Fourth official: Gus St. Silva

November 2, 2018	#7 LSU	1–0	#6 South Carolina	Orange Beach, Alabama
2:30 p.m. CST	Own Goal 65' (o.g.)	Report		Stadium: Orange Beach Sportsplex; Referee: Jonathan Weiner; Assistant referees: Alicia Messer; Kate Wasiak; Fourth official: Gus St. Silva

=== Final ===
November 4, 2018	#7 LSU	1–1 (a.e.t.) (4–1 p)	#4 Arkansas	Orange Beach, Alabama
1:00 p.m. CST	Shannon Cooke 72'	Report	Taylor Malham 13'; Marissa Kinsey (yellow card) 64'; Emily Russell (yellow card) 65'; Team (yellow card) 93'	Stadium: Orange Beach Sportsplex; Referee: Tori Penso; Assistant referees: Sam Bilbo; Kate Wasiak; Fourth official: Ceciah Valero
	Penalties
	Alex Thomas (penalty scored); Adrienne Richardson (penalty scored); Marlena Cutura (penalty scored); Abbey Newton (penalty scored)		Stefani Doyle (penalty missed); Taylor Malham (penalty missed); Haley VanFossen (penalty scored)

== Statistics ==
=== Goalscorers ===
There were 21 goals scored in 9 matches, for an average of 2.33 goals per match.

3 goals

- Alex Thomas – LSU

2 goals

- Taylor Malham – Arkansas
- Madison Alexander – Florida
- Shannon Cooke – LSU
- Julissa Cisneros – Missouri

1 goal

- Tori Cannata – Arkansas
- Reece Christopherson – Arkansas
- Kayla McKeon – Arkansas
- Taylor Troutman – Auburn
- Lauren Chang – South Carolina
- Luciana Zullo – South Carolina
- Bunny Shaw – Tennessee
- Emily Bates – Texas A&M

1 own goal

- South Carolina against LSU
- Ole Miss against Arkansas

== All-Tournament team ==
MVP in bold

Player	Team
Julia Lester	Florida
Kaylan Marckese	Florida
Rebecca Koch	South Carolina
Simone Wark	South Carolina
Stefanie Doyle	Arkansas
Kayla McKeon	Arkansas
Haley VanFossen	Arkansas
**Caroline Brockmeier**	LSU
Shannon Cooke	LSU
Adrienne Richardson	LSU
Alex Thomas	LSU

== See also ==
- Southeastern Conference
- 2018 NCAA Division I women's soccer season
- 2018 NCAA Division I Women's Soccer Tournament
