= 2018 Arkansas Razorbacks women's soccer team =

American college soccer season

2018 Arkansas Razorbacks women's soccer

SEC Tournament Final, L 1–1 vs. LSU NCAA Tournament Second Round
- Conference: Southeastern Conference
- Record: 14–6–3 (6–3–1 SEC)
- Head coach: Colby Hale (7th season)
- Assistant coaches: Rob Donnenwirth (1st season); Sammy Scofield (1st season)
- Home stadium: Razorback Field (Capacity: 1,500)

2018 SEC women's soccer standings
| | Conf. | | | | | | Overall |
| Team | W | | L | | T | PCT | W | | L | | T | PCT |
|---|---|---|---|---|---|---|---|---|---|---|---|---|
| No. 13 Vanderbilt ‍†‍‍^{y} | 8 | – | 1 | – | 1 | .850 | 15 | – | 3 | – | 1 | .816 |
| No. 10 Tennessee ‍‍‍^{y} | 7 | – | 2 | – | 1 | .750 | 14 | – | 2 | – | 1 | .853 |
| Arkansas ‍‍‍^{y} | 6 | – | 3 | – | 1 | .650 | 14 | – | 4 | – | 3 | .738 |
| Ole Miss ‍‍‍^{y} | 6 | – | 3 | – | 1 | .650 | 12 | – | 7 | – | 1 | .625 |
| No. 18 South Carolina ‍‍‍^{y} | 6 | – | 3 | – | 1 | .650 | 14 | – | 5 | – | 1 | .725 |
| No. 16 Texas A&M ‍‍‍^{y} | 6 | – | 3 | – | 1 | .650 | 15 | – | 4 | – | 1 | .775 |
| No. 19 LSU ‍‍‡‍^{y} | 5 | – | 4 | – | 1 | .550 | 13 | – | 6 | – | 3 | .659 |
| Florida ‍‍‍ | 4 | – | 4 | – | 2 | .500 | 7 | – | 10 | – | 4 | .429 |
| Auburn ‍‍‍^{y} | 4 | – | 5 | – | 1 | .450 | 12 | – | 6 | – | 2 | .650 |
| Missouri ‍‍‍ | 3 | – | 6 | – | 1 | .350 | 6 | – | 11 | – | 2 | .368 |
| Alabama ‍‍‍ | 2 | – | 6 | – | 2 | .300 | 8 | – | 8 | – | 3 | .500 |
| Mississippi State ‍‍‍^{y} | 2 | – | 6 | – | 2 | .300 | 9 | – | 7 | – | 2 | .556 |
| Georgia ‍‍‍ | 1 | – | 6 | – | 3 | .250 | 4 | – | 9 | – | 5 | .361 |
| Kentucky ‍‍‍ | 1 | – | 9 | – | 0 | .100 | 5 | – | 14 | – | 0 | .263 |
† – Conference champion ‡ – 2018 SEC Tournament champion y – Invited to the NCAA tournament As of November 13, 2018; Rankings from United Soccer Coaches Poll; Source: SEC

The 2018 Arkansas Razorbacks women's soccer team represented the University of Arkansas during the 2018 NCAA Division I women's soccer season. This season was the 33rd in program history. The Razorbacks played their home games at Razorback Field in Fayetteville.

== Previous season ==
In 2017, the Razorbacks finished the regular season 9–9–1, 4–5–1 in SEC play, and were seeded eighth in the SEC Tournament, where they defeated top-ranked South Carolina en route to the championship game, where they fell to Texas A&M. The Razorbacks were selected as an at-large bid to the NCAA Tournament, where they fell to NC State in the first round of the North Carolina bracket. The Hogs finished their season with a record of 11–11–2.

== Personnel ==
=== Roster ===
2018 Arkansas Razorbacks women's soccer
| Goalkeepers: 0 Abbey Saddler – Freshman; 00 Alexis Bach – (redshirt) Freshman; 1 Rachel Harris – Sophomore; 33 Taylor Beitz – (redshirt) Sophomore; Defenders: 2 Marissa Kinsey – Junior; 5 Julia Laskaris – Sophomore; 6 Carly Hoke – Senior; 7 Madison Louk – Junior; 9 Kolbrun Elfjysdottir – Freshman; 15 Libby Rumbelow – Freshman; 20 Madi McBurnett – Freshman; 21 Ellie Breden – Senior; 26 Bryana Hunter – Freshman; 99 Haley Vanfossen – Sophomore | Midfielders: 4 Elizabeth Gousious – Freshman; 10 Alli Gardner – (redshirt) Freshman; 11 Brooke Pirkle – Sophomore; 12 Kayla McKeon – Junior; 13 Tyler Runnels – Freshman; 14 Taylor Malham – Sophomore; 16 Emily Russell – Freshman; 17 Stefani Doyle – Junior; 18 Reece Christopherson – Senior; 19 Maddie Ricketts – Freshman; 23 Nayeli Perez – Sophomore; 24 Abbi Neece – Sophomore; Forwards: 3 Tori Cannata – Junior; 8 Caroline Campbell – Sophomore; 22 Parker Goins – Sophomore; 27 Kaelee van Gundy – Freshman |

=== Coaching staff ===
| Coach | Position | Year in Position | Alma Mater |
|---|---|---|---|
| Colby Hale | Head coach | 7th | Oral Roberts University (1997) |
| Rob Donnenwirth | Int. Assistant Coach | 1st | West Virginia Wesleyan College (1988) |
| Sammy Scofield | Assistant coach | 1st | University of Notre Dame (2015) |

== Schedule ==
| Date Time, TV | Rank^{#} | Opponent^{#} | Result | Record | Site (Attendance) City, State |
Spring exhibition
| March 3; 12:00 p.m. | | Mississippi State | W 1–0 | | Razorback Field; Fayetteville, AR |
| March 30*; 6:30 p.m. | | Tulsa Soccer Club U15 Boys | L 1–2 | | Razorback Field; Fayetteville, AR |
| April 15; 2:00 p.m. | | vs. Ole Miss | W 1–0 | | Stephens Track & Soccer Complex; Conway, AR |
Fall exhibition
| August 4*; 6:30 p.m. | | Kansas State | W 1–0 | | Razorback Field; Fayetteville, AR |
| August 9*; 7:00 p.m. | | at Nebraska | W 3–1 | | Barbara Hibner Soccer Stadium; Lincoln, NE |
Regular season
| August 17*; 4:00 p.m. | | vs. Duquesne; 2018 Penn State Invitational | W 1–0 | 1–0 | Jeffrey Field; State College, PA |
| August 19*; 11:00 a.m. | | vs. No. 9 West Virginia; 2018 Penn State Invitational | T 1–1 ^{AET} | 1–0–1 | Jeffrey Field; State College, PA |
| August 24*; 7:00 p.m. | | Omaha | W 2–0 | 2–0–1 | Razorback Field (667); Fayetteville, AR |
| August 26*; 1:00 p.m., COX Sports | | at McNeese State | L 2–3 ^{AET} | 2–1–1 | Cowgirl Field (320); Lake Charles, LA |
| August 31*; 7:00 p.m., SECN+ | | Baylor | W 3–2 | 3–1–1 | Razorback Field (2,529); Fayetteville, AR |
| September 7*; 7:00 p.m., SECN+ | | Florida Atlantic | W 3–1 | 4–1–1 | Razorback Field (564); Fayetteville, AR |
| September 9*; 1:00 p.m., SECN+ | | Connecticut | W 3–1 | 5–1–1 | Razorback Field; Fayetteville, AR |
| September 13; 6:00 p.m. | | at Georgia | L 1–3 | 5–2–1 (0–1–0) | Turner Soccer Complex (791); Athens, GA |
| September 16*; 6:00 p.m., SECN+ | | Providence | T 1–1 ^{AET} | 5–2–2 (0–1–0) | Razorback Field (542); Fayetteville, AR |
| September 20; 7:00 p.m., SEC Network | | No. 2 Texas A&M | W 3–2 | 6–2–2 (1–1–0) | Razorback Field (901); Fayetteville, AR |
| September 23; 6:30 p.m., SECN+ | | at Alabama | W 1–0 | 7–2–2 (2–1–0) | Alabama Soccer Stadium (387); Tuscaloosa, AL |
| September 27; 6:30 p.m., SEC Network | | Missouri | W 1–0 | 8–2–2 (3–1–0) | Razorback Field (553); Fayetteville, AR |
| October 4; 6:30 p.m., SECN+ | | LSU | W 2–1 ^{AET} | 9–2–2 (4–1–0) | Razorback Field (713); Fayetteville, AR |
| October 7; 2:00 p.m., SECN+ | | at Ole Miss | L 1–3 | 9–3–2 (4–2–0) | Ole Miss Soccer Stadium (1,008); Oxford, MS |
| October 11; 6:30 p.m., SECN+ | | Kentucky | W 4–0 | 10–3–2 (5–2–0) | Razorback Field (677); Fayetteville, AR |
| October 18; 7:00 p.m., SECN+ | | at No. 25 Mississippi State | T 0–0 ^{AET} | 10–3–3 (5–2–1) | MSU Soccer Field (562); Starkville, MS |
| October 21; 1:00 p.m., SECN+ | | No. 21 Auburn | W 3–1 | 11–3–3 (6–2–1) | Razorback Field (977); Fayetteville, AR |
| October 25; 5:30 p.m., SECN+ | | at Florida | L 0–3 | 11–4–3 (6–3–1) | James G. Pressly Stadium (519); Gainesville, FL |
SEC Tournament
| October 30; 7:30 p.m., SEC Network | (4) | vs. (5) Ole Miss; SEC Tournament Quarterfinal | W 4–0 | 12–4–3 | Orange Beach Sportsplex; Orange Beach, AL |
| November 2; 12:00 p.m., SEC Network | (4) | vs. (8) Florida; SEC Tournament Semifinal | W 1–0 ^{AET} | 13–4–3 | Orange Beach Sportsplex; Orange Beach, AL |
| November 4; 1:00 p.m., SEC Network | (4) | vs. (7) LSU; SEC Tournament Final | T 1–1 ^{AET} L 1–4 in pens. | 13–5–3 | Orange Beach Sportsplex; Orange Beach, AL |
SEC Tournament
| November 9; 7:00 p.m., SECN+ | | Little Rock; NCAA Tournament First Round | W 5–1 | 14–5–3 | Razorback Field (1,123); Fayetteville, AR |
| November 16; 5:30 p.m., SECN+ | | vs. Virginia Tech; NCAA Tournament Second Round | L 0–1 ^{AET} | 14–6–3 | Koka Booth Stadium (402); Cary, NC |
*Non-conference game. ^{#}Rankings from United Soccer Coaches. (#) Tournament seedings in parentheses.

== Postseason game summaries ==
=== SEC Quarterfinal – vs. Ole Miss ===
30 October 2018
7:30 p.m.

| (5) Ole Miss | 0–4 | Arkansas (4) |
|---|---|---|
| | Univ. of Ark. SEC | Tori Cannata 2'; Own goal 4'; Taylor Malham 7'; Channing Foster (yellow card) 45'; Reece Christopherson 58'; Mary Kate Smith (yellow card) 86' |

Orange Beach Sportsplex,
Orange Beach, Alabama
Referee: Mike Dee

=== SEC Semifinal – vs. Florida ===
2 November 2018
12:00 p.m.

| (8) Florida | 0–1 (a.e.t.) | Arkansas (4) |
|---|---|---|
| Sammie Betters (yellow card) 74' | Univ. of Ark. SEC | Abbi Neece (yellow card) 39'; Kayla McKeon 91' |

Orange Beach Sportsplex,
Orange Beach, Alabama
Referee: Corey Rockwell

=== SEC Final – vs. LSU ===
4 November 2018
1:00 p.m.

| (7) LSU | 1–1 (a.e.t.) | Arkansas (4) |
|---|---|---|
| Shannon Cooke 72' | | Taylor Malham 13' |
Penalties
| | 4–1 |

Orange Beach Sportsplex,
Orange Beach, Alabama
Referee: Tori Penso
