= George Fotopoulos =

American soccer coach

Biographical details
- Education: University of Tampa

Coaching career (HC unless noted)
- 1998–1999: Tampa
- 2000–2004: LSU

Head coaching record
- Overall: 72–53–14

George Fotopoulos is an American soccer coach with Greek background. He coached the Louisiana State University (LSU) women's soccer team from 2000 to 2004. Fotopoulos went 52–39–14 in five years at LSU, posting a 12–28–6 record in the Southeastern Conference (SEC). He began his career at LSU in 2000 after two years as head coach at his alma mater, the University of Tampa posting a 20–14 record.

In 2008, Fotopoulos became Director of Coaching and player development for girls for Tampa Bay United Soccer Club and is now a director at Florida Premier FC.

== LSU ==
In 2000, he led his team to a 15–6 overall record with a 5–4 mark in the SEC, good for second place in the SEC West. The team advanced to the SEC Tournament but was knocked out in the first round in a 2–0 loss to Kentucky. In 2001, the team finished sixth in the SEC West with a 7–8–3 overall record (1–6–2 in the SEC). In 2002, Fotopoulos had his best season as head coach of the Lady Tigers as his team went 12–5–3 and 2–3–3 in the SEC, good for another bid in the conference tournament. The team upset No. 8 Auburn in the first round of the tournament before losing to Florida 2–0 in the second round. In 2003, the team posted its third winning season in four years when it went 10–9–1 and 2–7 in the SEC West, but the team failed to reach the SEC Tournament.

Danielle Fotopoulos joined her husband at LSU as co-head coach before the 2004 season after serving as a volunteer to the coaching staff in 2003. As a player at the University of Florida, she set the NCAA record for points (284) and goals (118) for both men and women.

After finishing 8–11–1 (2–8–1 in the SEC) in 2004, Fotopoulos and his wife resigned on November 4, 2004. They were succeeded by Brian Lee.
