= Kaylan Marckese =

American soccer player (born 1998)

Personal information
- Full name: Kaylan Jenna Marckese
- Date of birth: April 22, 1998 (age 28)
- Place of birth: St. Petersburg, Florida, U.S.
- Height: 5 ft 11 in (1.80 m)
- Position: Goalkeeper

Youth career
- 2011–2015: Tampa Bay United

College career
Years	Team	Apps	(Gls)
2015–2018	Florida Gators	78	(0)

Senior career*
Years	Team	Apps	(Gls)
2020	Selfoss	16	(0)
2021–2022	HB Køge	35	(0)
2022–2024	Arsenal	2	(0)
2023–2024	→ Bristol City (loan)	4	(0)
2024–2025	Tampa Bay Sun	1	(0)
- * Club domestic league appearances and goals as of June 30, 2025

Kaylan Jenna Marckese (born April 22, 1998) is an American former professional soccer player who played as a goalkeeper.

== College career ==
Marckese played as first goalkeeper for the Florida Gators between 2015 and 2018. She was named to the SEC All-Tournament team in 2017 and 2018.

She received a bachelor's degree in Sports Management in December 2018, at the University of Florida.

== Club career ==
=== Sky Blue FC ===
Marckese was selected in the 4th round with the 28th pick in the 2019 NWSL College Draft by Sky Blue FC (now known as Gotham FC). She did not sign with the team or make any appearances.

=== Selfoss ===
In April 2020, Marckese signed for Selfoss in the Úrvalsdeild. Marckese played 19 games and helped the team win the 2020 Icelandic Super Cup.

=== HB Køge ===
In January 2021, Marckese signed for the Danish league club and newly promoted HB Køge. Marckese spent two seasons with the club as their starting goalkeeper, and helped the team win two successive Kvindeliga titles in 2020–21 and 2021–22.

She started all eight of HB Koge’s matches in the 2021–22 UEFA Women's Champions League. Marckese made 48 saves, the most by any goalkeeper in the competition.

=== Arsenal ===
On July 25, 2022, Marckese signed for Arsenal. On the October 27, 2022 she made her club debut in the UEFA Women's Champions League group stage match against FC Zürich Frauen.

Her departure from the club was announced on May 15, 2024.

==== Loan to Bristol City ====
On August 2, 2023, it was announced that Marckese would spend the 2023–24 season on loan with Bristol City. After suffering an anterior cruciate ligament injury on November 12 in a match against Aston Villa, Marckese returned to Arsenal to continue her rehabilitation.

=== Tampa Bay Sun ===
On July 8, 2024, Marckese returned to her hometown by signing with the Tampa Bay Sun ahead of the inaugural USL Super League season. On 6 March 2025, Marckese and her team announced that she had ruptured her ACL, after going down 10 minutes into her debut on 8 February 2025.

In November 2025, Marckese announced her retirement from playing professionally as a result of accumulated knee injuries.

== Community Work ==
Marckese works with young primary school girls to pursue careers in sport. She has also spoken at the Arsenal Embrace Equity event during International Women’s Month to highlight the contributions women have made in society. For her community work, Marckese was named the Professional Footballers’ Association (PFA) Community Champion for the 2022/23 season. She has also been involved in The Second Half programme, an initiative co-founded by Kim Little and Karen Carney to help players prepare for retirement from professional play.

== Honors ==
Selfoss

- Icelandic Super Cup: 2020

HB Køge

- Kvindeliga: 2020–21, 2021–22

Arsenal

- FA Women's League Cup: 2022–23

Tampa Bay Sun

- USL Super League: 2024–25
