= 2015 Florida Gators women's soccer team =

American college soccer season

2015 Florida Gators women's soccer
- Conference: Southeastern Conference
- Head coach: Becky Burleigh

The 2015 Florida Gators soccer team represented the University of Florida soccer program for the 2015 NCAA soccer season.

== Schedule ==
Legend
	Florida win
	Florida loss
	Postponement
**Bold**	Florida team member

2015 Florida Gators Soccer Game Log
Regular season
August

Date	Opponent	Rank	Stadium Site	Score	Attendance	Overall record	SEC record
August 11	Troy (Exhibition)		Gainseville, FL	–		0–0	0–0
August 15	Florida Gulf Coast		Gainesville, FL	–		–	0–0
August 21	at UCF	8	Orlando, FL	2–0		1–0	0–0
August 23	at Ohio State		Columbus, OH	–		–	0–0
August 28	at Miami		Coral Gables, FL	–		–	0–0
August 30	Florida State		Gainesville, FL	–		–	0–0

September

Date	Opponent	Rank	Stadium Site	Score	Attendance	Overall record	SEC record
September 4	Oklahoma State		Gainesville, FL	–		–	0–0
September 10	Texas A&M		Gainesville, FL	–		–	–
September 13	at Jacksonville		Jacksonville, FL	–		–	–
September 18	Mississippi		Gainesville, FL	–		–	–
September 20	at Florida International		Miami, FL	–		–	–
September 25	at Vanderbilt		Nashville, TN	–		–	–
September 27	at Auburn		Auburn, AL	–		–	–

October

Date	Opponent	Rank	Stadium Site	Score	Attendance	Overall record	SEC record
October 2	Kentucky		Gainesville, FL	–		–	–
October 9	at Tennessee		Knoxville, TN	–		–	–
October 11	LSU		Gainesville, FL	–		–	–
October 16	at Mississippi State		Starkville, MS	–		–	–
October 22	South Carolina		Gainesville, FL	–		–	–
October 25	Arkansas		Gainesville, FL	–		–	–
October 29	at Georgia		Athens, GA	–		–	–

Postseason
SEC Tournament

Date	Opponent	Rank	Stadium Site	Score	Attendance	Overall record	SECT record

NCAA Tournament

Date	Opponent	Rank	Stadium Site	Score	Attendance	Overall record	Regional record
