= LSU Soccer Stadium =

Soccer stadium in Baton Rouge, Louisiana

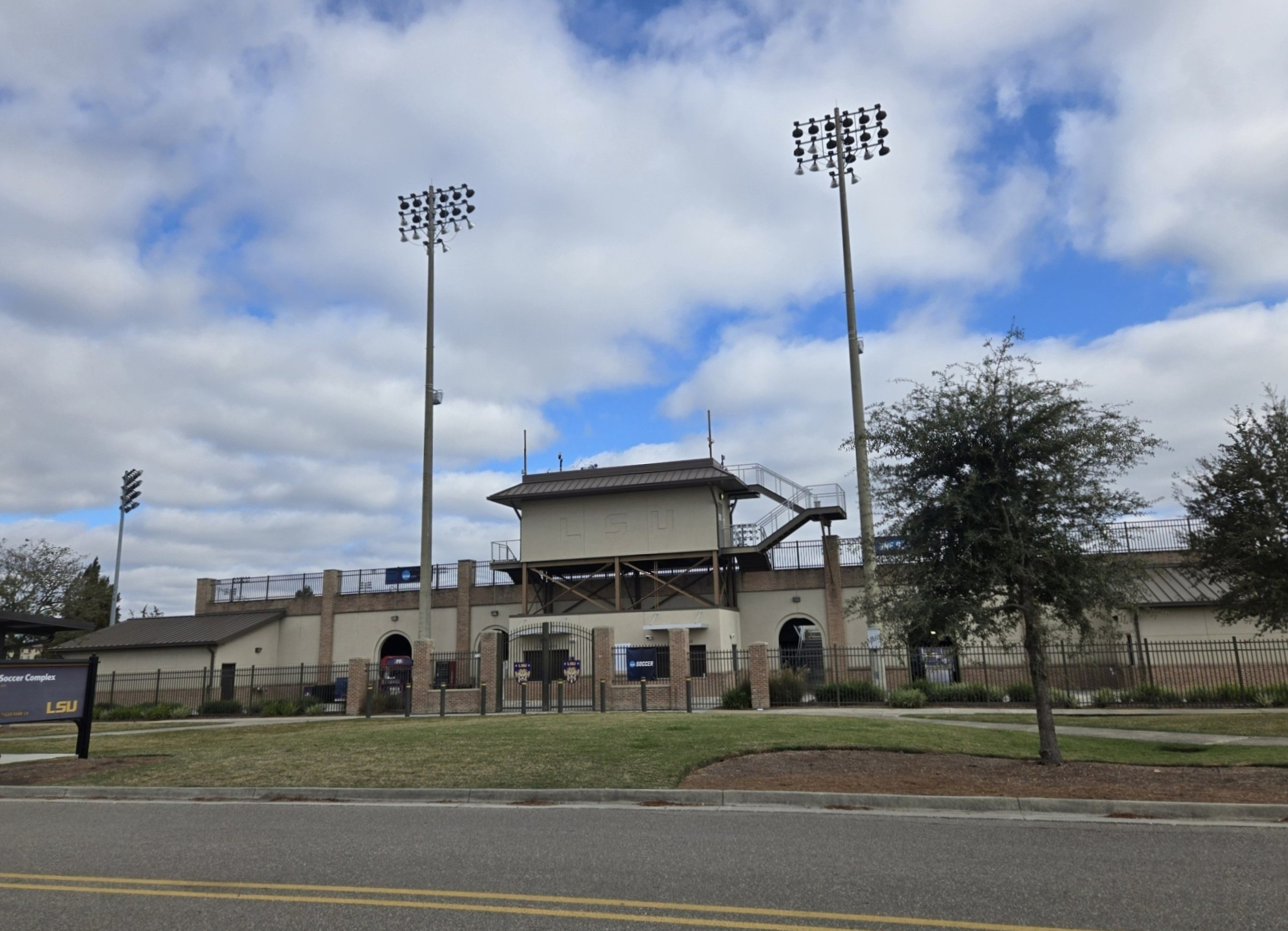
- Exterior view of the stadium
- Interactive map of LSU Soccer Stadium
- Address: Nicholson Drive; Baton Rouge, LA; United States
- Coordinates: 30°25′52″N 97°10′41″W
- Owner: Louisiana State University
- Operator: LSU Athletics
- Capacity: 2,197
- Type: Soccer-specific stadium
- Record attendance: 3,021 (Mississippi State, September 17th, 2021)
- Current use: Soccer

Construction
- Built: 1996
- Opened: September 13, 1996; 29 years ago

Tenants
- LSU Tigers (NCAA) teams: women's soccer

Website
- lsusports.net/lsu-soccer-stadium

The LSU Soccer Stadium is a soccer facility located on the campus of Louisiana State University in Baton Rouge, United States. The facility was built in 1996. It serves as the home of the LSU Tigers women's soccer team. The two-level stadium has a seating capacity of 2,197.

In 2010 and 2011, the soccer stadium received extensive renovations which included a second-level of seating, a new press box and wrought-iron style gates and fencing with brick columns were built on the west side of the complex.

== Gallery ==
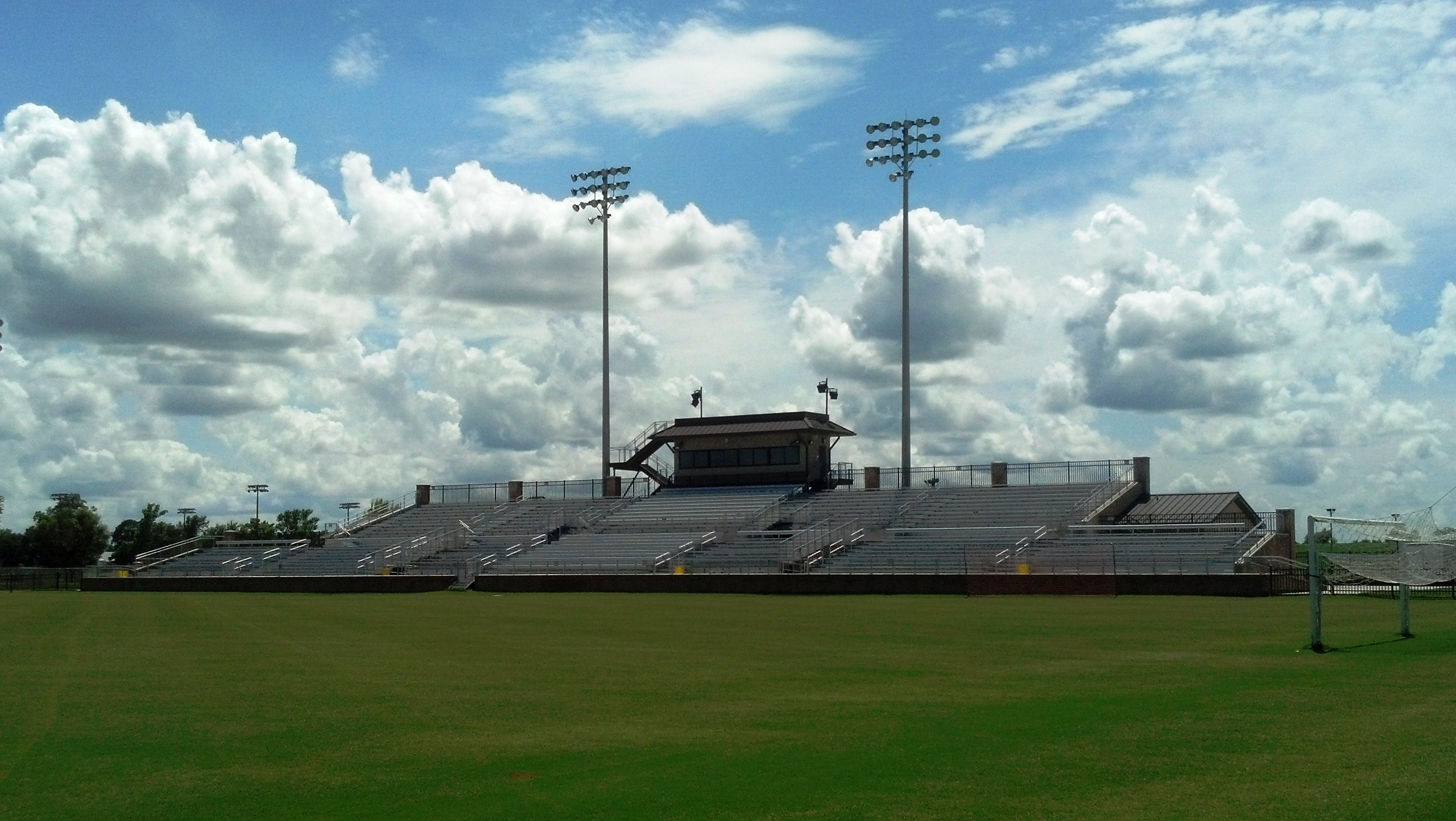
LSU Soccer Stadium, Pitch and Stands

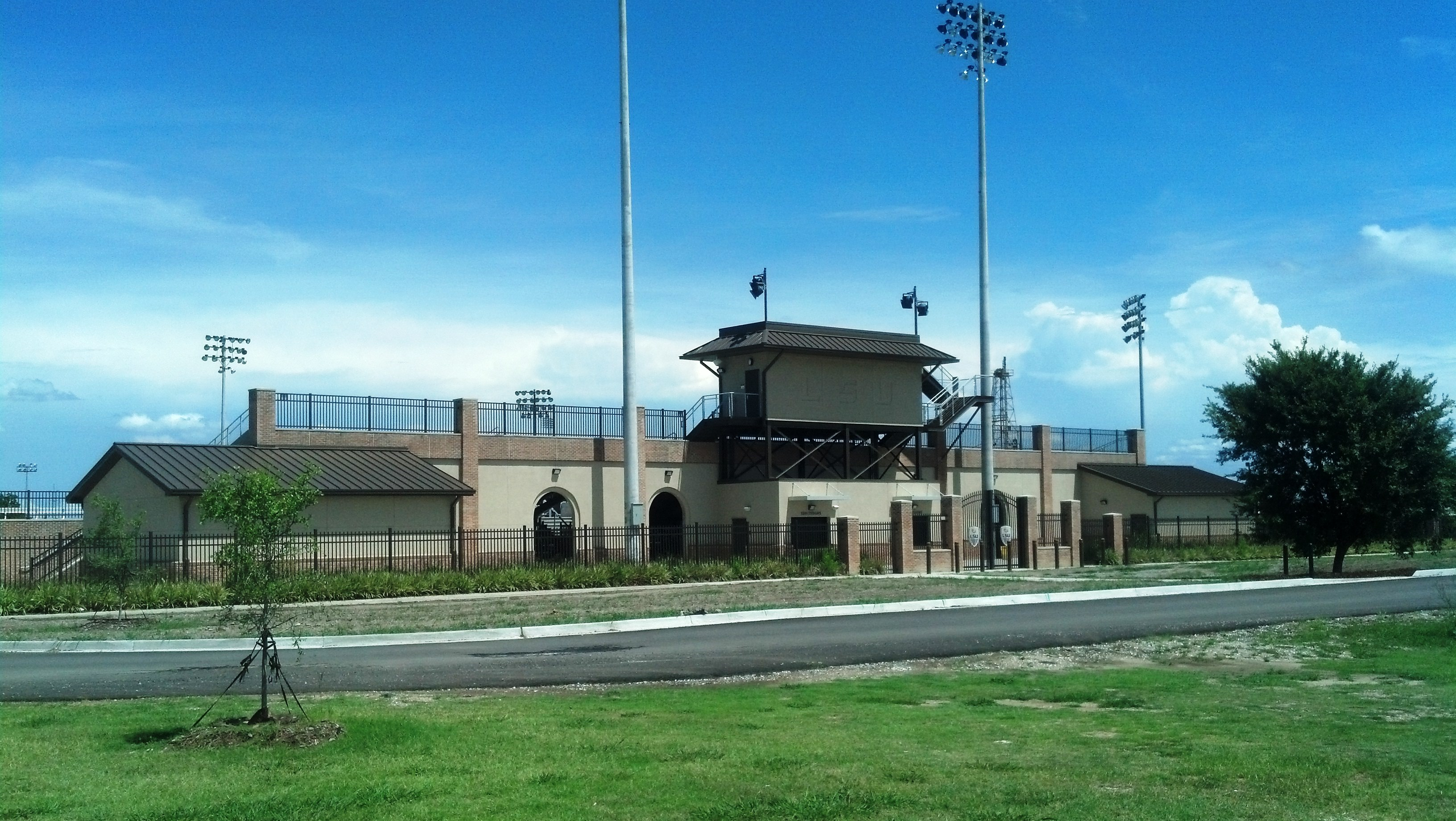
LSU Soccer Stadium, 2010's

== See also ==
- LSU Tigers and Lady Tigers
- List of soccer stadiums in the United States
