= Danielle Fotopoulos =

American soccer coach and player (born 1976)

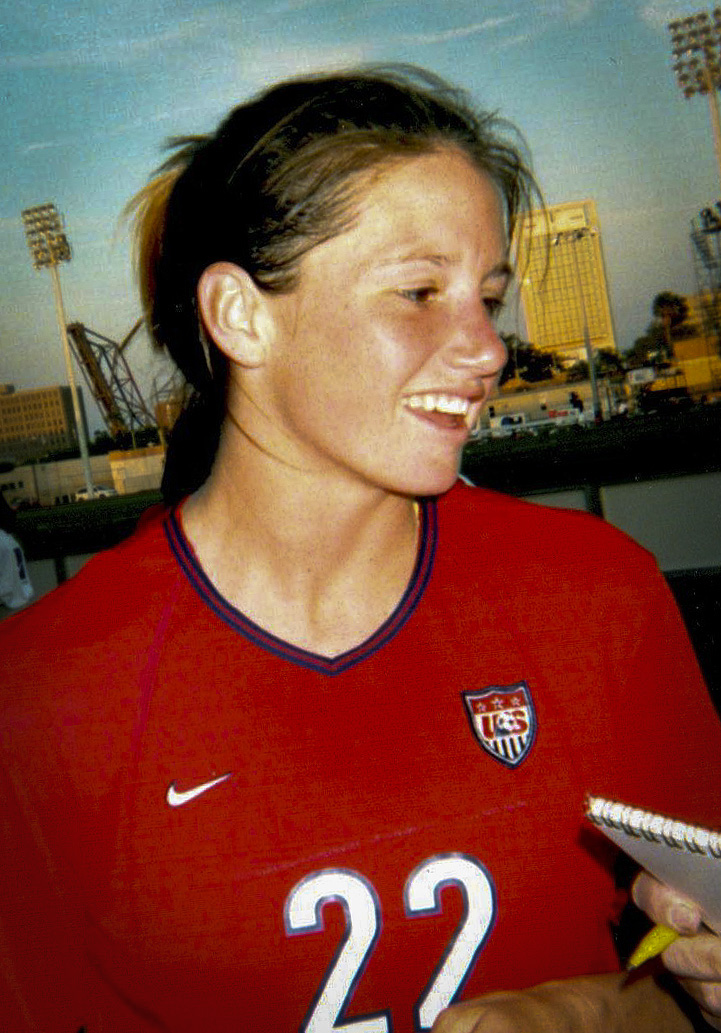
- Fotopoulos with the United States national team

Personal information
- Full name: Danielle Ruth Fotopoulos
- Birth name: Danielle Ruth Garrett
- Date of birth: March 24, 1976 (age 50)
- Place of birth: Camp Hill, Pennsylvania
- Height: 5 ft 11 in (1.80 m)
- Position: Forward

Team information
- Current team: Eckerd College (coach)

Youth career
- 1990–1993: Lyman High School

College career
Years	Team	Apps	(Gls)
1994–1995	SMU Mustangs	44	(52)
1996–1998	Florida Gators	48	(66)

Senior career*
Years	Team	Apps	(Gls)
1998	Tampa Bay Extreme	4	(6)
2001–2003	Carolina Courage	53	(27)
2005	Central Florida Krush		

International career
1996–2005	United States	35	(16)

Managerial career
- 2004: LSU
- 2010–2022: Eckerd
- * Club domestic league appearances and goals

Danielle Ruth Fotopoulos (née Garrett; born March 24, 1976) is an American soccer coach and former player. Fotopoulos holds the all-time National Collegiate Athletic Association (NCAA) Division I records for goals and points, and was a member of the University of Florida team that won the 1998 NCAA women's soccer championship, and also the United States national team that won the 1999 FIFA Women's World Cup. She was the head coach of the Eckerd women's soccer team until 2022.

== Early life ==
Fotopoulos was born in Camp Hill, Pennsylvania in 1976, the daughter of Bill and Donna Garrett. She grew up in Altamonte Springs, Florida, and attended Lyman High School in Longwood, Florida from 1990 to 1994. While in high school, she was a varsity letterman in six different sports—basketball, cross country, soccer, tennis, swimming and track & field. Her high school soccer team won three Florida state championships during her four years on the team.

== College career ==
Fotopoulos initially attended Southern Methodist University (SMU) in Dallas, Texas, where she played for the SMU Mustangs soccer team from 1994 to 1995. After her sophomore year, she transferred from SMU to the University of Florida in Gainesville, Florida, where she played for coach Becky Burleigh's new Florida Gators women's soccer team for two seasons. She suffered an ACL injury before the start of the 1997 season and returned to the Gators for her senior year in 1998. She helped the Gators win the 1998 NCAA Women's Soccer Championship, scoring the winning goal against North Carolina in the final of the NCAA soccer tournament. During her 1996 and 1998 seasons with the Gators, the team also won both the Southeastern Conference (SEC) regular season and tournament championships, and she was twice recognized as the SEC Player of the Year. Fotopoulos finished her college career as the NCAA's all-time leader in goals (118) and points (284). She was the 1998–99 recipient of the Honda Sports Award for Soccer, recognizing her as the outstanding collegiate women's soccer player of the year.

She graduated from Florida with a bachelor's degree in 1999, and was inducted into the University of Florida Athletic Hall of Fame as a "Gator Great" in 2008.

== Professional career ==
Fotopoulos played professionally with the Carolina Courage of the Women's United Soccer Association, winning the league championship in 2002. She was also a member of the United States Women's National Soccer team.

== Coaching career ==
Fotopoulos is married to former Louisiana State University (LSU) women's soccer team head coach George Fotopoulos. In 2004, she served as co-head coach with her husband at LSU. They finished with an 8–11–1 overall record (2–8–1 in the SEC). In 2006, she became an assistant coach for the Florida Gators soccer team at the University of Florida, her alma mater. She currently lives in Tampa, Florida with her husband and their four children. She coached multiple teams at the Tampa Bay United Soccer Club and currently coaches at Florida Premier FC where she is the GIRLS ECNLR Director. She is also a partner for the semi-pro team, Tampa Bay Hellenic; her husband is currently the head coach. From 2010 to 2022, Fotopoulos was the head of coach of the NCAA Division II women's soccer team at Eckerd College in St. Petersburg, Florida from 2010 until stepping down in August 2022.

On February 25, 2026, Fotopoulos led the Sunlake High boys soccer team to the program's first state title, defeating Jacksonville Mandarin 3-2 for the FHSAA Class 6A championship at Spec Martin Municipal Stadium in Deland, Florida.

== Honors ==
=== Individual awards and honors ===
- WUSA All-Star team selection: 2003
- Second-team All-WUSA: 2002
- Honda Award: 1998
- NSCAA National Player of the Year: 1998
- ESPN.com/Soccer Times National Player of the Year: 1998
- Soccer America Player of the Year: 1998
- NCAA Final Four Offensive MVP: 1998
- Southeastern Conference Player of the Year: 1996, 1998
- All-American: 1995, 1996, 1998
- SEC Tournament MVP: 1996

=== Team honors ===
- FIFA Women's World Cup (1999)
- Women's United Soccer Association Founders Cup (2002)
- NCAA Women's Soccer Championship (1999)

== Statistics ==
=== College ===
Year	Team	GP/GS	Goals	Assists	Total points
1994	SMU	20/19	20	5	45
1995	SMU	24/23	32	19	85
1996	Florida	22/22	34	13	83
1997	Florida	Did not play			
1998	Florida	26/26	32	11	75
Totals		92/90	118	48	284

=== WUSA ===
Year	Team	GP/GS	Goals	Assists	Total points
2001	Carolina Courage	21/21	9	5	23
2002	Carolina Courage	21/20	11	10	32
2003	Carolina Courage	12/12	7	6	20
Totals		54/53	27	21	75

=== W-League ===
Year	Team	GP	Goals
1998	Tampa Bay Extremes	4	6
2005	Central Florida Krush		9
Totals			15

=== National team ===
Year	GP/GS	Goals	Assists	Total points
1996	2/1	3	2	8
1997	6/0	1	1	3
1998	1/0	0	0	0
1999	17/1	7	4	18
2000	Did not play			
2001	Did not play			
2002	4/0	1	0	2
2003	Did not play			
2004	Did not play			
2005	5/1	4	0	8
Totals	35/3	16	7	39

== See also ==
- Florida Gators
- List of Florida Gators soccer players
- List of University of Florida alumni
- List of University of Florida Athletic Hall of Fame members
