= Miriam Hickey =

American soccer coach

Coaching career (HC unless noted)
- 1995–1996: LSU

Head coaching record
- Overall: 22–17–1

Miriam Hickey was the first head coach of the LSU women's soccer team. Hickey went 22-17-1 in two years at LSU, posting a 7–9 record in the SEC.

In 1995, her inaugural team finished 11-9-1 overall with a 5–3 mark in the SEC, tied for second in the SEC West and good enough for a bid in the conference tournament. In 1996, the team finished with an 11–8 overall record (2–6 in the SEC). Hickey was replaced after the 1996 season by Gregg Boggs.

In 2017, Hickey was named by U.S. Soccer as the Director of the Girls’ Development Academy. Hickey joins U.S. Soccer after working as a women's soccer instructor for FIFA, a National Development Officer for the Netherlands Football Federation. She was also the Girls’ Director of Coaching at Troy Soccer Club in Michigan.
