= LSU Tigers women's soccer =

American college soccer team

- Founded: 1995; 31 years ago
- University: Louisiana State University
- Head coach: Sian Hudson (7th season)
- Conference: SEC; Western Division
- Location: Baton Rouge, Louisiana, US
- Stadium: LSU Soccer Stadium (capacity: 2,197)
- Nickname: Tigers
- Colors: Purple and gold
Home	Away

NCAA tournament Round of 16
- 2025

NCAA tournament Round of 32
- 2007, 2009, 2018

NCAA tournament appearances
- 2007, 2008, 2009, 2011, 2015, 2018, 2021, 2022, 2025

Conference tournament championships
- 2018

The LSU Tigers (Note: LSU uses the nickname of "Lady Tigers" only in sports that have both men's and women's teams. Since LSU only sponsors soccer for women, that team uses "Tigers" instead.) women's soccer team represents Louisiana State University in the sport of soccer. The Tigers compete in Division I of the National Collegiate Athletic Association (NCAA) and the Southeastern Conference (SEC). The Tigers play their home games at the LSU Soccer Stadium which is on the university's Baton Rouge, Louisiana campus.

== History ==
The LSU Tigers soccer team's first season was in 1995. The Tigers' first coach was Miriam Hickey who compiled a record of 22–17–1 (.563) at LSU from 1995 to 1996. The second coach in LSU soccer history was Gregg Boggs who coached the Tigers from 1997 to 1999. He had a record of 12–44–3 (.229). In 2000, George Fotopoulos was hired as head coach of the LSU soccer team and amassed a record of 52–39–8 (.566) during his 5 years at LSU. During George Fotopoulos' final season in 2004, his wife Danielle Fotopoulos was hired as co-head coach of the LSU soccer team. During her only season at LSU, she along with her husband compiled a record of 8–11–1 (.425) in 2004.

In 2005, Brian Lee was named head soccer coach at LSU. He coached LSU for fourteen seasons until he left following the 2018 season. During his tenure the Tigers compiled a record of 143–100–45 (.575) and won 4 SEC West Division titles in 2007, 2008, 2009 and 2011. The Tigers won their first SEC Tournament in program history in 2018.

== Players ==
=== Current roster ===
As of July 29, 2026

Note: Flags indicate national team as defined under FIFA eligibility rules; some limited exceptions apply. Players may hold more than one non-FIFA nationality.

No.	Pos.	Nation	Player
00	GK	USA	Rylie Kuyper
0	GK	USA	Katelyn Holt
1	GK	USA	Audur Scheving
2	DF	USA	Emma Alvord
3	DF	ISL	Rakel Sigurðardottir
4	DF	USA	Ryleigh Albin
5	FW	USA	Alexia Hansen
6	MF	FRA	Maud Ferrière
7	FW	USA	Ryann Denecour
8	MF	USA	Ella Kate Johnston
9	FW	USA	Amy Smith
10	MF	ISL	Berglind Hlynsdottir
11	FW	CAN	Sariyah Bailey
12	MF	CAN	Ava Villapando
14	DF	USA	Annaleigh Bruser
16	MF	USA	Mia Connard

No.	Pos.	Nation	Player
18	FW	USA	Kelsey Major
19	DF	USA	Lila Jaillet
20	FW	USA	Ava Galligan
21	DF	USA	Jaya Dern
22	MF	USA	Ava Amsden
23	FW	USA	Allie Fryer
24	DF	USA	Kylee Rocha
25	FW	USA	Senai Rogers
27	GK	BEL	Marie Pues
28	MF	USA	Brielyn Knowles
32	MF	JPN	Linka Ono

=== All-Americans ===
United Soccer Coaches (previously National Soccer Coaches Association of America)

Player	Year team
Malorie Rutledge	2008–3rd Team
Lucy Parker	2018–3rd Team

== Year-by-year results ==
- East and West Divisions were removed in 2013.

Year	Head coach	Overall Record	Conference Record	Standing	Division	Postseason
LSU Tigers (Southeastern Conference) (1995–present)
1995	Miriam Hickey	11–9–1	5–3	2nd	West	
1996	Miriam Hickey	11–8	2–6	5th	West	
1997	Gregg Boggs	0–18	0–8	6th	West	
1998	Gregg Boggs	8–11–2	3–5	2nd	West	
1999	Gregg Boggs	4–15–1	2–7	6th	West	
2000	George Fotopoulos	15–6	5–4	2nd	West	
2001	George Fotopoulos	7–8–3	1–6–2	6th	West	
2002	George Fotopoulos	12–5–3	2–3–3	3rd	West	
2003	George Fotopoulos	10–9–1	2–7	6th	West	
2004	George Fotopoulos (Note: Along with Danielle Fotopoulos.)	8–11–1	2–8–1	6th	West	
2005	Brian Lee	8–10–2	3–7–1	3rd	West	
2006	Brian Lee	9–8–3	4–4–3	3rd	West	
2007	Brian Lee	12–5–7	5–2–4	1st	West	NCAA Tournament 2nd Round
2008	Brian Lee	14–4–2	7–3–1	1st	West	NCAA Tournament 1st Round
2009	Brian Lee	15–4–5	8–2–1	1st	West	NCAA Tournament 2nd Round
2010	Brian Lee	8–8–5	4–4–3	2nd	West	
2011	Brian Lee	13–8–1	8–3	1st	West	NCAA Tournament 1st Round
2012	Brian Lee	9–8–4	5–6–2	4th	West	
2013	Brian Lee	9–9–2	5–5–1	7th		
2014	Brian Lee	5–13–2	1–9–1	13th		
2015	Brian Lee	13–6–4	5–4–2	7th		NCAA Tournament 1st Round
2016	Brian Lee	7–11–1	2–8–1	12th		
2017	Brian Lee	8–7–3	1–6–3	13th		
2018	Brian Lee	13–7–4	5–4–1	7th		NCAA Tournament 2nd Round
2019	Debbie Hensley	3–12–3	1–7–2	7th	West	
2020 (Note: Incomplete season due to COVID-19 pandemic.)	Sian Hudson	4–7–3	0–6–2	7th	West	
2021	Sian Hudson	11–8–1	4–6–0	6th	West	NCAA Tournament 1st Round
2022	Sian Hudson	10–4–7	1–2–4	5th	West	NCAA Tournament 2nd Round
Total		257–239–71	93–145–38			

== Stadium ==
=== LSU Soccer Stadium ===
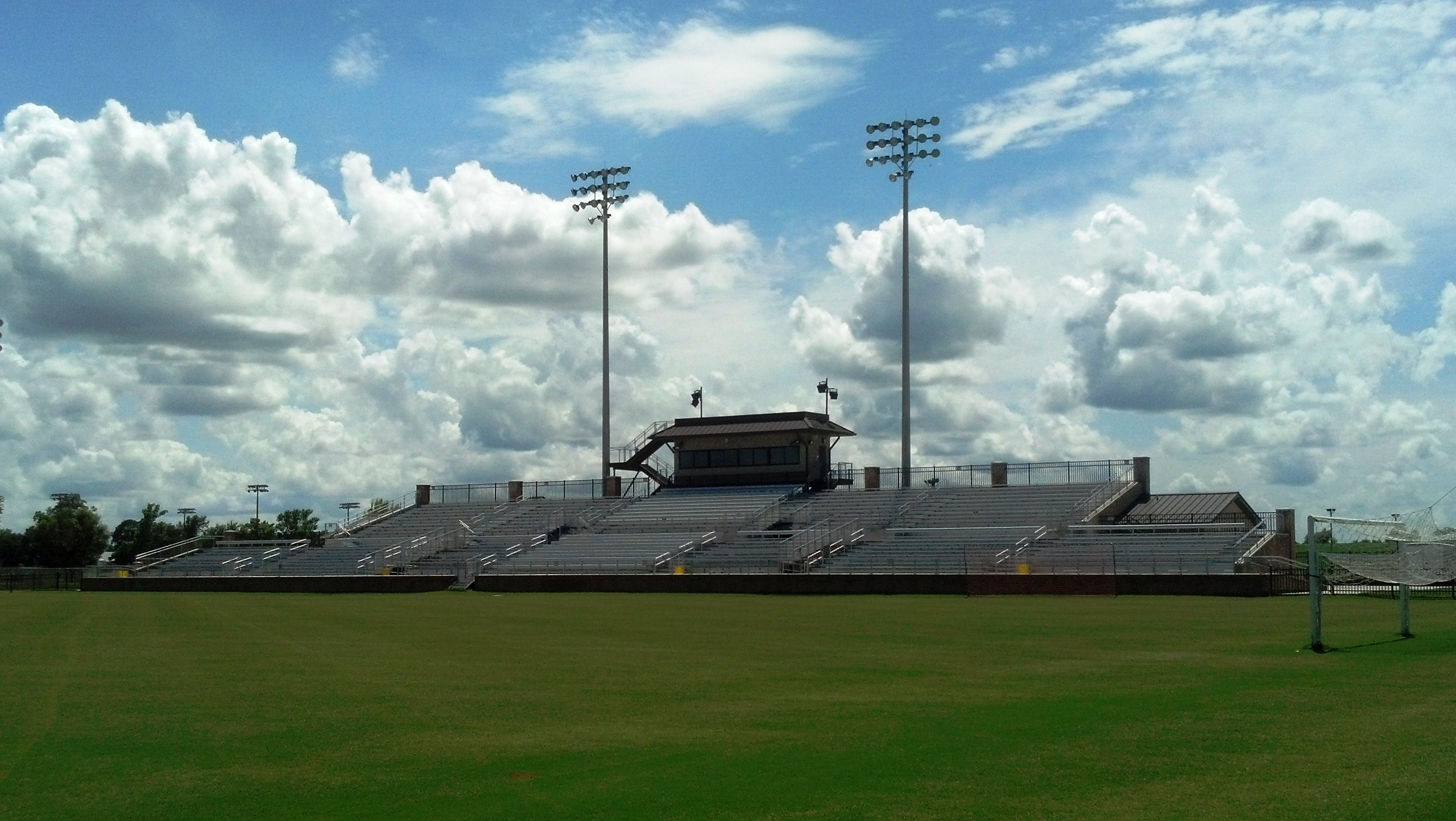
LSU Soccer Stadium, venue of the Tigers

The "LSU Soccer Stadium" is a soccer-specific stadium facility located on the campus of Louisiana State University in Baton Rouge. The stadium, built in 1996, serves as the home of the LSU Tigers soccer team. The two-level stadium has a seating capacity of 2,197.

== Practice and Training facilities ==
=== LSU Indoor Practice facility ===
The LSU Indoor Practice Facility, built in 1991, is a climate-controlled 8,250 square feet facility. It is used when inclement weather prevents the soccer team from practicing at the LSU Soccer Stadium. It holds the 100-yd Anderson-Feazel LSU Indoor field. The playing surface is Momentum Field Turf by SportExe.

=== Strength and Conditioning facility ===
The LSU Tigers soccer team weight room is over 10,000 square feet and includes multi-purpose flat surface platform, bench, incline, squat and Olympic lifting stations along with dumbbell bench stations. It is also equipped with medicine balls, hurdles, plyometric boxes, assorted speed and agility equipment, treadmills, stationary bikes and elliptical cross trainers. The weight room features multiple high-definition TV's for multimedia presentations. It is located in the LSU Football Operations Center.

=== Training room ===
The training room located in the LSU Football Operations Center features hydrotherapy which includes hot/cold Jacuzzis and an underwater treadmill and multiple stations to treat the players.

== Head coaches ==
Name	Tenure	Record at LSU
Miriam Hickey	1995–1996	22–17–1 Overall, 7–9 SEC
Gregg Boggs	1997–1999	12–44–3 Overall, 5–20 SEC
George Fotopoulos	2000–2004	52–39–8 Overall, 12–28–6 SEC
Danielle Fotopoulos	2004	8–11–1 Overall, 2–8–1 SEC
Brian Lee	2005–2018	143–100–45 Overall, 65–68–27 SEC

== See also ==
- LSU Tigers and Lady Tigers
