= Brian Lee (soccer) =

English-born soccer coach (born 1971)

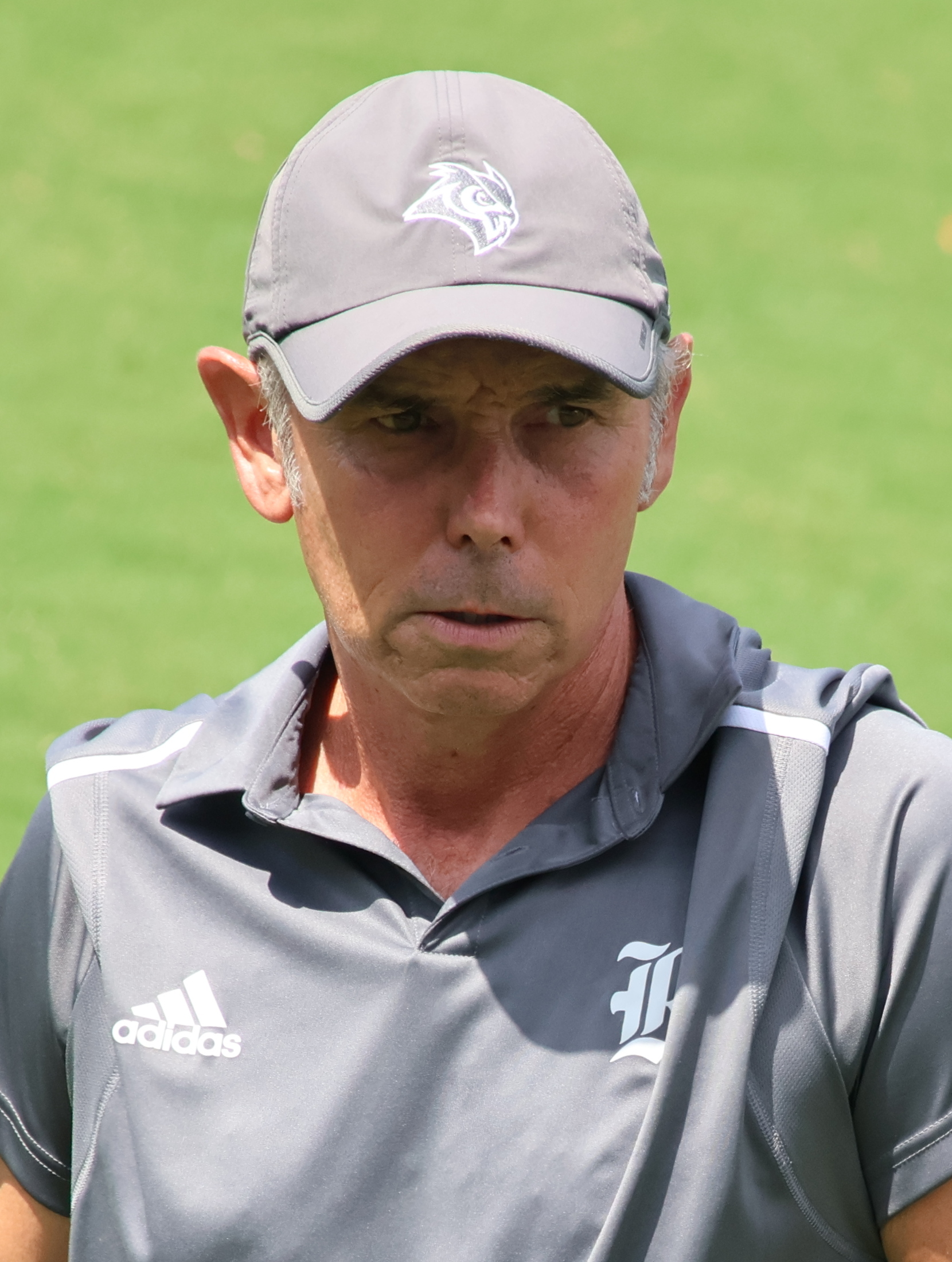
- Lee with Rice in 2025

Current position
- Title: Head coach
- Team: Rice
- Conference: Conference USA

Biographical details
- Born: May 14, 1971 (age 55); Cheltenham, England
- Education: Furman

Coaching career (HC unless noted)
- 1994–2004: Furman
- 2005–2018: LSU
- 2019–present: Rice

Accomplishments and honors

Awards
- 1999 South Region Coach of the Year; 2018 South Region Coach of the Year

Brian Gordon Lee (born May 14, 1971, in Cheltenham, England) is the head coach of the Rice Owls women's soccer team.

== Coaching career ==
=== Furman ===
Lee was head coach for 11 seasons at Furman, where he accumulated a 144–80–10 overall record, including a 76–16–3 mark in the Southern Conference. Lee was the Southern Conference Coach of the Year five times and was named the NSCAA and SoccerBuzz Southeast Region Coach of the Year in 1999, the same year he was selected as a finalist for NSCAA National Coach of the Year honors.

=== LSU ===
Lee was head women's soccer coach at LSU from 2005 to 2018. At LSU, Lee had an overall record of 143–100–45 and an SEC record of 65–68–27. Lee coached LSU to six NCAA Tournament appearances and four SEC West Division titles. He coached 46 players that earned All-SEC honors and nine All-Americans at LSU.

=== Rice ===
On March 29, 2019, Lee was named Rice Owls women's soccer head coach.

== Playing career ==
A successful athlete in his own right, Lee played for the Furman soccer team from 1989 to 1992 where he was part of three Southern Conference titles and was selected as a team captain and the Most Valuable Player. He also led his team to three Southern Conference championships and its first ever NCAA appearance, and a berth in the Sweet 16 in 1991. Lee also led Gaither HS to the 1989 Florida State HS Final.
