= Florida Gators women's soccer =

Women's soccer team of the University of Florida

Florida Gators soccer
- Founded: 1995
- University: University of Florida
- Head coach: Nick Zimmerman (1st season)
- Conference: SEC; Eastern Division
- Location: Gainesville, Florida, US
- Stadium: Donald R. Dizney Stadium (capacity: 1,500)
- Nickname: Florida Gators
- Colors: Orange and blue

NCAA tournament championships
- 1998

NCAA tournament College Cup
- 1998, 2001

NCAA tournament Quarterfinals
- 1996, 1998, 2001, 2003, 2014, 2017

NCAA tournament Round of 16
- 1996, 1997, 1998, 2001, 2003, 2006, 2007, 2008, 2012, 2014, 2015, 2016, 2017

NCAA tournament Round of 32
- 1996, 1997, 1998, 1999, 2000, 2001, 2003, 2006, 2007, 2008, 2009, 2010, 2011, 2012, 2013, 2014, 2015, 2016, 2017

NCAA tournament appearances
- 1996, 1997, 1998, 1999, 2000, 2001, 2003, 2004, 2005, 2006, 2007, 2008, 2009, 2010, 2011, 2012, 2013, 2014, 2015, 2016, 2017, 2019

Conference tournament championships
- 1996, 1997, 1998, 1999, 2000, 2001, 2004, 2007, 2010, 2012, 2015, 2016

Conference regular season championships
- 1996, 1998, 1999, 2000, 2001, 2006, 2007, 2008, 2009, 2010, 2012, 2013, 2015

The Florida Gators women's soccer is the team represents at the University of Florida in the sport of college soccer. The Gators compete in Division I of the National Collegiate Athletic Association (NCAA) and they are part of the Southeastern Conference (SEC). Home games are played at Donald R. Dizney Stadium on the university's Gainesville, Florida campus. They have won thirteen conference championships and one NCAA national championship.

== History ==
Becky Burleigh was named the first head coach of the start-up Florida Gators soccer program on June 28, 1994. Since the Gators began playing in the fall of 1995, the team has compiled a record of 414-120-36 and a winning percentage of 0.7579, and Burleigh's Gators teams have qualified for the NCAA Tournament in 21 of the 24 seasons of the program's history.

In 1998, in the Gators soccer program's fourth year of existence, the Gators won their first NCAA national title by defeating the defending national champion North Carolina Tar Heels 1–0 in the final game of the tournament. The 1998 Gators finished 26–1, having lost their only match to the same North Carolina team that the Gators defeated in the NCAA championship final. Players from the Gators' 1998 national championship team included All-Americans Erin Baxter, Danielle Fotopoulos and Heather Mitts.

In addition to their 1998 national championship season, the Gators have advanced to the NCAA tournament semi-final once (2001), the quarter-finals four times (1996, 2003, 2014, 2017), and the round of sixteen six times (2006, 2007, 2008, 2012, 2014, 2017).

The Gators play in the Southeastern Conference. In conference play, the Gators teams have won ten SEC championships, and twelve SEC tournament titles, leading all other SEC teams since the Florida soccer team began play in 1995. Most recently, the Gators won the SEC championship (regular season) again in 2015 and the SEC championship (tournament) in 2016. In 2016, the Gators advanced to the third round of the NCAA tournament before losing to Auburn. The Gators finished the 2016 season 8–3-0 in the SEC, and 17-5-1 overall.

Burleigh announced she would retire at the end of the team's 2020–21 season and was replaced by Embry-Riddle head coach Samantha Bohon.

== Roster ==
As of September 5, 2024

Note: Flags indicate national team as defined under FIFA eligibility rules; some limited exceptions apply. Players may hold more than one non-FIFA nationality.

No.	Pos.	Nation	Player
0	GK	DOM	Paloma Peña
1	GK	USA	Jayden Emmanuel
2	MF	USA	Elyse Campbell
3	FW	USA	Tatum O'Coyne
4	FW	USA	Megan Hinnenkamp
5	GK	USA	Alexa Goldberg
6	DF	USA	Avery Upton
7	DF	USA	Lauren McCloskey
8	FW	USA	Charlotte McClure
9	DF	USA	Josie Curtis
10	MF	USA	Madison Jones
11	FW	USA	Sophie White
12	FW	USA	Ryleigh Acosta
13	FW	SWE	Vera Blom
14	DF	USA	Njeri Butts
15	MF	USA	Lauren Donovan
16	DF	USA	Emilee Hauser

No.	Pos.	Nation	Player
17	FW	USA	Delaney Tellex
18	FW	SWE	Liwa Nilsson
19	MF	USA	Kaela Standish
20	DF	USA	Anna DeLeon
21	DF	USA	Madison Young
22	MF	USA	Oakley Rasmussen
23	DF	USA	Daviana Vaka
24	MF	USA	Lucy Froitzheim
25	MF	USA	Delaney Tauzel
27	MF	USA	Norah Abbott
28	MF	USA	Emma Duval
29	FW	USA	Lena Bailey
30	FW	USA	Amelia Malkin
31	GK	USA	Paris Bice
32	FW	USA	Zamiyah Hill
33	DF	USA	Skye Barnes

== Notable players ==
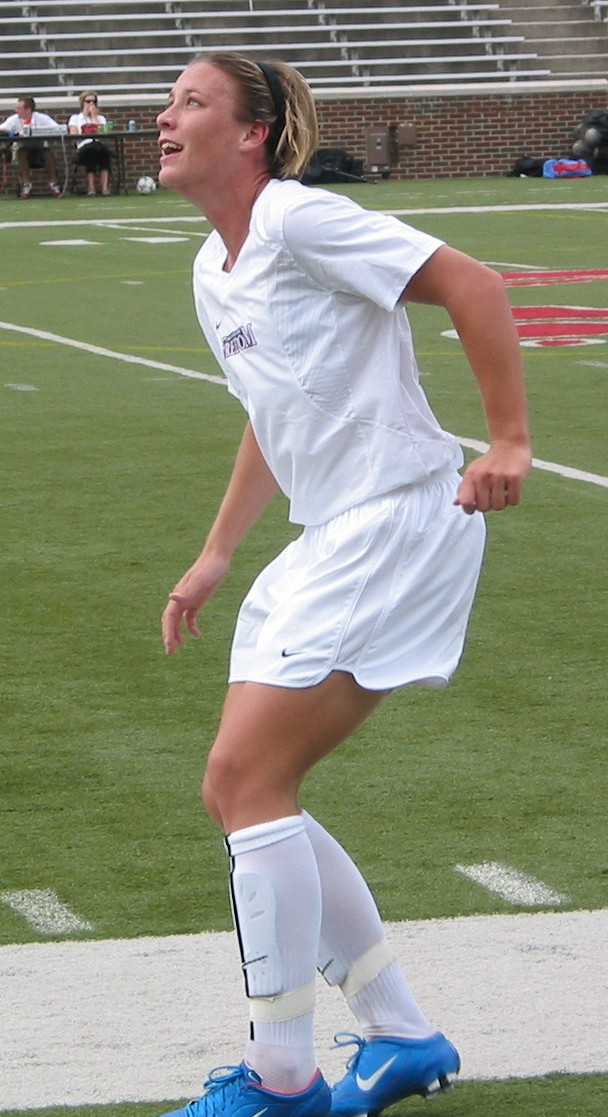
Abby Wambach, first-team All-SEC (1998–2001), first-team All-American (1999, 2001), tied for the school record for career goals

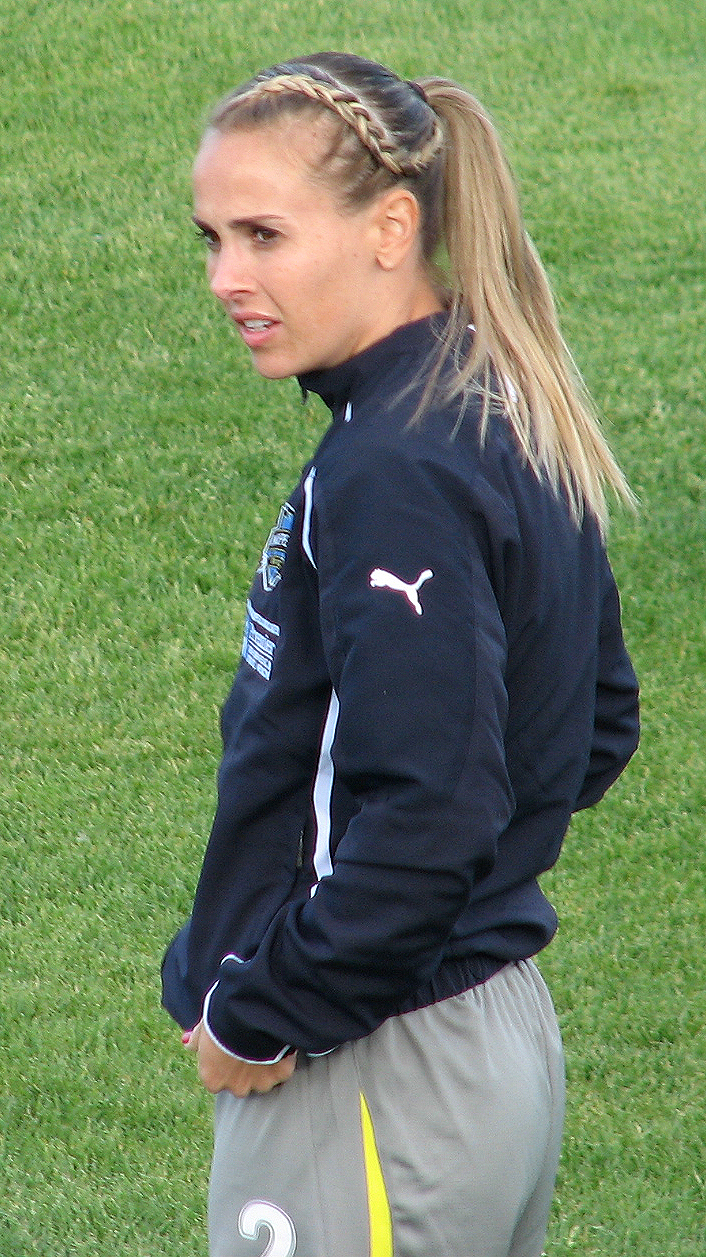
Heather Mitts won two Olympic gold medals with the United States

=== First-team All-Americans ===
The following Florida soccer players have been named first-team All-Americans:

- Erin Baxter (1997)
- Danielle Fotopoulos (1998)
- Heather Mitts (1999)
- Abby Wambach (1999, 2001)
- Melanie Booth (2005)
- Erika Tymrak (2012)
- Christen Westphal (2015)
- Savannah Jordan (2015)

=== Internationals and professionals ===
- Former All-American Danielle Fotopoulos was a member of the U.S. National Team (1996–2005), and played on the 1999 FIFA Women's World Cup championship team.
- Abby Wambach and Heather Mitts won the gold medal with the United States in women's soccer at the 2004 Summer Olympics in Athens, and Mitts won the gold medal again at the 2008 games in Beijing. Both Wambach and Mitts were members of the U.S. runner-up team in the 2011 FIFA Women's World Cup, while Wambach captained the 2015 FIFA Women's World Cup winning team.
- Former All-American Melanie Booth has been a member of the Canada National Team since 2001, and was a member of Canada's FIFA Women's World Cup team in (2007).
- Danielle Murphy played for the England National Team from 1998 to 2003, and was the youngest-ever member of England's FIFA Women's World Cup team.
- Erika Tymrak was named National Women's Soccer League Rookie of the Year in 2013 and won two titles with FC Kansas City, in 2014 and 2014.
- Deanne Rose has been a member of the Canada National team since 2015, and won a bronze medal at the 2016 Olympic Games as well as a gold at the 2020 Tokyo Olympics.
- Christen Westphal was the third overall selection in the 2016 NWSL College Draft, taken by the Boston Breakers in the first round. She joined fellow former Gators Tymrak, Adriana Leon, Lauren Silver, Havana Solaun and Kat Williamson in the league.
- Kaylan Marckese was selected with the 28th pick in the 2019 NWSL College Draft by Sky Blue FC (now known as Gotham FC). In July 2022, she signed for Arsenal of the WSL.

== Coaching staff ==
Becky Burleigh became the first head coach of the Florida Gators soccer program on June 28, 1994. Prior to coaching at Florida, Burleigh was the head coach at Berry College, where her Lady Fury teams won two NAIA national championships. At Florida and Berry, Burleigh compiled an overall record of 496-141-43, with a winning percentage of 0.7610. She ranked fourth in total number of wins, and fifth in winning percentage, among all active Division I women's soccer coaches at the time of her tenure.

Tony Amato served as head coach for the 2021 season before being terminated after one season and a 4–12–4 record.

Samantha Bohon was hired as the third head coach of the program on May 16, 2022. On November 12, 2025, Bohon was fired after compiling an 18–34–18 overall record and 5–23–12 in SEC play over four seasons.

On December 5, 2025, Nick Zimmerman was named the fourth head coach in program history. Zimmerman, previously head coach at Mississippi State (where he led the team to a 12–7–1 record and an NCAA Tournament berth in 2025), will lead the Gators into their 32nd season in fall 2026.

=== Current coaching staff ===
- Head Coach: Nick Zimmerman (since December 2025)
- Associate Head Coach: Jonathan Garbar
- Assistant Coach: Kerri Hanks Petersen
- Assistant Coach: David Styles

== James G. Pressly Stadium ==
The Florida Gators soccer team plays its home games in James G. Pressly Stadium. Pressly Stadium is a dual-purpose facility serving as home to the soccer team and the men's and women's outdoor track & field teams. It is a lighted stadium and has a seating capacity of approximately 4,500. The stadium is named for James G. Pressly, a 1972 alumnus of the University of Florida College of Law, who made a generous contribution to have the facility upgraded for Division I play.

The Gators soccer team also has the exclusive use of a soccer practice field that was completed as part of the Florida Lacrosse Facility in 2009.

== All-time record ==
Year	Head coach	Overall	SEC	SEC Tournament	NCAA Tournament
1995	Becky Burleigh	14–4–2	6–1–1	First Round	
1996	Becky Burleigh	22–3–0	8–0–0	Champions	Quarterfinal
1997	Becky Burleigh	20–3–1	7–1–0	Champions	Second Round
1998	Becky Burleigh	26–1–0	8–0–0	Champions	Champions
1999	Becky Burleigh	21–2–0	9–0–0	Champions	Second Round
2000	Becky Burleigh	16–8–0	9–0–0	Champions	Second Round
2001	Becky Burleigh	21–4–1	8–1–0	Champions	Semifinal
2002	Becky Burleigh	10–10–2	5–3–1	Runner-up	
2003	Becky Burleigh	19–4–2	6–2–1	Runner-up	Quarterfinal
2004	Becky Burleigh	16–4–3	7–2–2	Champions	First Round
2005	Becky Burleigh	13–6–1	8–2–1	First Round	First Round
2006	Becky Burleigh	14–6–5	7–1–3	Runner-up	Third Round
2007	Becky Burleigh	17–5–3	9–2–0	Champions	Third Round
2008	Becky Burleigh	19–4–1	11–0–0	Semifinal	Third Round
2009	Becky Burleigh	16–6–2	8–1–2	Semifinal	Second Round
2010	Becky Burleigh	19–2–3	9–1–1	Semifinal	Second Round
2011	Becky Burleigh	17–8–0	7–4–0	Runner-up	Second Round
2012	Becky Burleigh	19–5–1	11–2–0	Champions	Third Round
2013	Becky Burleigh	18–5–1	9–2–0	Runner-up	Second Round
2014	Becky Burleigh	17–4–2	9–2–0	Quarterfinal	Quarterfinal
2015	Becky Burleigh	19–4–1	8–2–1	Champions	Third Round
2016	Becky Burleigh	17–5–1	8–3–0	Champions	Third Round
2017	Becky Burleigh	17–7–0	7–3–0	Semifinal	Quarterfinal
2018	Becky Burleigh	7–10–4	4–4–2	Semifinal	
2019	Becky Burleigh	11–9–1	6–3–1	Semifinal	First Round
2020	Becky Burleigh	6–8–3	1–6–1	Second Round	
2021	Tony Amato	4–12–4	3–6–1	Quarterfinal	
2022	Samantha Bohon	2–14–1	0–9–1	DNQ	
2023	Samantha Bohon	6–5–6	2–4–4	DNQ	
2024	Samantha Bohon	4–8–6	1–7–2	DNQ	
2025	Samantha Bohon	6–7–5	2–3–5	First Round	
2026	Nick Zimmerman	6–7–5	2–4–4	First Round	
Total		459–190–67	205–81–34		
National champion Conference regular season and conference tournament champion Conference tournament champion Conference regular season champion

== See also ==
- List of University of Florida Athletic Hall of Fame members
- List of University of Florida Olympians
- SEC Women's Soccer Tournament
- University Athletic Association
