= Tsakiris =

Tsakiris (Greek: Τσακίρης) is a Greek surname. Notable people with the surname include:

- Athanassios Tsakiris (born 1965), Greek biathlete and cross-country skier
- Constantinos Tsakiris (born 1971), Greek shipowner and banker
- Isabelle Tsakiris (born 1960), Australian cricketer
- Kai Tsakiris, American soccer player
- Niko Tsakiris (born 2005), American soccer player
- Shaun Tsakiris (born 1979), American soccer player
