= 2026 Washington Spirit season =

2026 Washington Spirit soccer season

Washington Spirit
2026 season
- Owner: Y. Michele Kang
- President of Soccer Operations: Haley Carter
- Head coach: Adrián González
- Stadium: Audi Field (capacity: 20,000)
- League: 3rd
- CONCACAF W Champions Cup (25–26): Runners-up
- Top goalscorer: League: Trinity Rodman (12); All: Trinity Rodman (14)
- Highest home attendance: 19,365 (2 matches, May 30 and Nov 14)
- Lowest home attendance: 9,349 (vs UTA, Mar 25)
- Average home league attendance: 16,260
- Biggest win: 4–0 (vs KC (H), NWSL, Apr 24)
- Biggest defeat: 0–3 (vs BOS (H), NWSL, Sep 13)
Home colors	Away colors
- All statistics correct as of November 14, 2026.

The 2026 Washington Spirit season is the team's fourteenth season as a professional women's soccer team. The Spirit play in the National Women's Soccer League (NWSL), the top tier of women's soccer in the United States. The Spirit are led by head coach Adrián González and play their home matches at Audi Field.

Washington also competed in the knockout stage of the 2025–26 CONCACAF W Champions Cup, defeating Pachuca in the semifinals before losing 5–3 to Club América in the final.

== Background ==
The Spirit entered 2026 after finishing as runners-up in the 2025 NWSL Championship. Head coach Adrián González returned for his second full season in charge. During the offseason, Washington signed forward Trinity Rodman to a new three-year contract through 2028.

Washington began the season without goalkeeper Aubrey Kingsbury and defender Casey Krueger, who were placed on maternity leave, while midfielder Andi Sullivan returned after missing most of the previous season due to injury.

== Team ==
=== Staff ===
As of July 12, 2026.

Sporting operations staff
Position	Name
President of soccer operations	Haley Carter
Sporting director	James Hocken

Sporting staff
Position	Name
Head coach	Adrián González
Assistant coach	Cristian Catena
Video analyst lead and assistant coach	Salva Todolí
Player development specialist and assistant coach	Victoria Boardman
Director of player personnel and assistant coach	Mike Bristol
Goalkeeper coach and set pieces specialist	Nicole Barnhart

Performance staff
Position	Name
Vice president, performance and medicine	Alicia Tang
Senior director, performance services	David Rhodes
Director, data and analytics	Seungbeum Lee
Director, medical services	Erwin Benedict Valencia
Director, mental performance and team culture	David McHugh
Director, women's health and individual performance	Elisa Angeles

== Players ==
As of October 29, 2026

No.	Nat.	Name	Date of birth (age)	Since	Previous team	Notes (Note: denotes a season-ending injury.)
Goalkeepers
1	(United States)	Aubrey Kingsbury (captain)	November 20, 1991 (aged 34)	2018	(United States) Orlando Pride	ML
18	(Scotland)	Sandy MacIver	June 18, 1998 (aged 28)	2025	(England) Manchester City	INT
28	(United States)	Sara Wojdelko	May 14, 2003 (aged 23)	2026	(United States) Vanderbilt Commodores	
31	(United States)	Kaylie Collins	May 17, 1998 (aged 28)	2024	(United States) Orlando Pride	
Defenders
3	(United States)	Casey Krueger	August 23, 1990 (aged 36)	2024	(United States) Chicago Red Stars	ML
5	(Canada)	Élisabeth Tsé	December 7, 2002 (aged 23)	2026	(France) Le Havre AC	INT
6	(United States)	Kate Wiesner	February 11, 2001 (aged 25)	2024	(United States) Penn State Nittany Lions	
9	(United States)	Tara Rudd	July 2, 1999 (aged 27)	2021	(United States) USC Trojans	
13	(Italy)	Lucia Di Guglielmo	June 27, 1997 (aged 29)	2025	(Italy) AS Roma	INT
14	(Canada)	Gabrielle Carle	October 12, 1998 (aged 28)	2022	(Sweden) Kristianstads DFF	
24	(England)	Esme Morgan	October 18, 2000 (aged 26)	2024	(England) Manchester City	
26	(United States)	Paige Metayer	January 23, 2001 (aged 25)	2023	(United States) California Golden Bears	
35	(United States)	Madison Haugen	November 30, 2001 (aged 24)	2026	(Portugal) Sporting CP	STR
—	(Burkina Faso)	Alimata Bélem	September 2, 2004 (aged 22)	2026	(Spain) SD Eibar	LOA
Midfielders
7	(Algeria)	Mélissa Bethi	November 18, 2005 (aged 20)	2026	(France) FC Nantes	INT
8	(Cameroon)	Monique Ngock	September 17, 2004 (aged 22)	2026	(France) FC Fleury 91	INT
10	(Colombia)	Leicy Santos	May 16, 1996 (aged 30)	2024	(Spain) Atlético Madrid	
12	(United States)	Andi Sullivan	December 20, 1995 (aged 30)	2018	(United States) Stanford Cardinal	
17	(United States)	Hal Hershfelt	October 3, 2001 (aged 25)	2024	(United States) Clemson Tigers	SEI
20	(Nigeria)	Deborah Abiodun	November 2, 2003 (aged 22)	2025	(United States) Pittsburgh Panthers	INT
22	(United States)	Heather Stainbrook	March 14, 2001 (aged 25)	2024	(United States) Utah Valley Wolverines	LOA
Forwards
2	(United States)	Trinity Rodman	May 20, 2002 (aged 24)	2021		
11	(Paraguay)	Claudia Martínez	January 15, 2008 (aged 18)	2026	(Paraguay) Club Olimpia	INT
16	(Brazil)	Tamara Bolt	January 15, 2008 (aged 18)	2025	(Brazil) SC Internacional	INT
19	(Ivory Coast)	Rosemonde Kouassi	December 26, 2001 (aged 24)	2024	(France) FC Fleury 91 Cœur d’Essonne	
25	(Tanzania)	Clara Luvanga	February 25, 2005 (aged 21)	2026	(Saudi Arabia) Al-Nassr FC	INT
27	(Italy)	Sofia Cantore	September 30, 1999 (aged 27)	2025	(Italy) Juventus FC	INT
29	(United States)	Emma Gaines-Ramos	March 18, 2002 (aged 24)	2025	(United States) San Diego State Aztecs	
33	(United States)	Ashley Hatch	May 25, 1995 (aged 29)	2018	(United States) North Carolina Courage	

Legend

(SEI) Season-Ending Injury, (INT) International Slot, (D45) 45-day injury list, (STR) Short-Term Injury Replacement, (LOA) Loaned out, (LIN) Loaned in, (ML) Maternity Leave

=== Players leaving mid-season ===
No.	Nat.	Name	Date of birth (age)	Since	Previous team	Notes
4	(Mexico)	Rebeca Bernal	August 31, 1997 (aged 29)	2025	(Mexico) C.F. Monterrey	Transferred to Manchester United Sept. 2
21	(Nigeria)	Gift Monday	December 9, 2001 (aged 24)	2025	(Spain) UD Tenerife	Traded to Boston Legacy FC Oct. 8

== Competitions ==
=== NWSL ===
==== Regular season standings ====
Pos	Team	Pld	W	D	L	GF	GA	GD	Pts	Qualification
1	Gotham FC (S)	30	18	7	5	39	23	+16	61	Playoffs and CONCACAF W Champions Cup
2	San Diego Wave FC	30	18	4	8	45	31	+14	58	Playoffs and CONCACAF W Champions Cup
3	Washington Spirit	30	17	4	9	43	28	+15	55	Playoffs
4	Kansas City Current (C)	30	16	5	9	54	39	+15	53	Playoffs and CONCACAF W Champions Cup
5	Angel City FC	30	15	7	8	54	32	+22	52	Playoffs

Source: NWSL
Rules for classification: 1) points; 2) total goal difference; 3) total wins; 4) total goals scored; 5) head-to-head points; 6) head-to-head goal goals scored; 7) fewest disciplinary points; 8) coin toss (if 2 clubs tied) or drawing of lots (if ≥3 clubs tied).
(C) Champions; (S) NWSL Shield

==== Results summary ====
Overall								Home						Away					
Pld	W	D	L	GF	GA	GD	Pts	W	D	L	GF	GA	GD	W	D	L	GF	GA	GD
30	17	4	9	43	28	+15	55	8	1	6	18	14	+4	9	3	3	25	14	+11

Last updated: November 1, 2026.
Source: NWSLsoccer.com

==== Results by matchday ====
Matchday	1	2	3	4	5	6	7	8	9	10	11	12	13	14	15	16	17	18	19	20	21	22	23	24	25	26	27	28	29	30
Ground	H	A	H	A	A	H	H	A	A	A	H	H	A	A	A	H	A	H	H	A	H	H	A	H	A	H	A	H	A	H
Result	L	D	D	D	W	W	W	W	W	L	W	W	W	L	W	W	W	L	L	D	L	W	W	L	W	L	W	W	L	W
Position	14	14	14	13	8	6	3	2	2	3	2	2	2	2	1	1	1	2	2	2	3	2	2	2	2	2	3	3	3	3

Updated to match(es) played on November 1, 2026. Source: NWSLsoccer.com
A = Away; H = Home; W = Win; D = Draw; L = Loss; P = Postponed

==== Matches ====
March 13, 2026 1	Washington Spirit	0–1	Portland Thorns FC	Washington D.C.
8:00 pm EDT		Report	Moultrie 52'	Stadium: Audi Field; Attendance: 19,215; Referee: Brad Jensen

March 20, 2026 2	Racing Louisville FC	2–2	Washington Spirit	Louisville, Kentucky
8:00 p.m. EDT (UTC-4)	Fischer 28'; Sears 43', (yellow card) 76'; Flint (yellow card) 90+6'	Report	Cantore 50'; Santos 74'	Stadium: Lynn Family Stadium; Attendance: 5,722; Referee: Calin Radosav

March 25, 2026 3	Washington Spirit	1–1	Utah Royals	Washington, D.C.
7:00 p.m. EDT (UTC-4)	Bernal 18'	Report	Simmonds (yellow card) 21'; Tanaka 84'	Stadium: Audi Field; Attendance: 9,349; Referee: JC Griggs

March 28, 2026 4	Denver Summit FC	0–0	Washington Spirit	Denver, Colorado
2:00 p.m. EDT (UTC-4)	Kurtz (yellow card) 83'	Report	Hershfelt (yellow card) 72'	Stadium: Empower Field at Mile High; Attendance: 63,004; Referee: Joshua Encarnación

April 5, 2026 5	Bay FC	0–2	Washington Spirit	San Jose, California
5:00 p.m. EDT (UTC-4)	Courtnall (yellow card) 90'	Report	Courtnall 57' (o.g.); Monday 86'	Stadium: PayPal Park; Attendance: 10,237; Referee: Matthew Corrigan

April 24, 2026 6	Washington Spirit	4–0	Kansas City Current	Washington, D.C.
8:00 p.m. EDT (UTC-4)	Santos 25', 56'; Rodman 45+3'; Martínez 75'	Report	Sharples (yellow card) 13'; Cooper (yellow card) 43'	Stadium: Audi Field; Attendance: 19,215; Referee: Nabil Bensalah

April 29, 2026 7	Washington Spirit	1–0	Racing Louisville FC	Washington, D.C.
7:00 p.m. EDT (UTC-4)	Rodman (yellow card) 10', (goal) 15'	Report	Fischer (yellow card) 34'	Stadium: Audi Field; Attendance: 10,587; Referee: Trevor Wiseman

May 2, 2026 8	Orlando Pride	2–4	Washington Spirit	Orlando, Florida
5:37 p.m. EDT (UTC-4)	Banda 33', 39'; Lemos (penalty missed) 33'	Report	Cantore 2', 6'; Di Guglielmo (yellow card) 19'; MacIver (penalty missed) 33', (yellow card) 82'; Martínez 55'; Rodman 70'; Morgan (yellow card) 78'	Stadium: Inter&Co Stadium; Attendance: 7,507; Referee: Shawn Tehini
Note: Kickoff delayed from 4:00 p.m. EDT due to lightning strikes in the area.

May 10, 2026 9	Seattle Reign FC	0–1	Washington Spirit	Seattle, Washington
7:00 p.m. EDT (UTC-4)	Mondésir (yellow card) 65'	Report	Bernal (yellow card) 36'; Morgan (yellow card) 72'; Martínez 83'	Stadium: Lumen Field; Attendance: 7,597; Referee: Jaclyn Metz

May 15, 2026 10	San Diego Wave FC	2–1	Washington Spirit	San Diego, California
10:00 p.m. EDT (UTC-4)	Byars 6'; Barcenas (yellow card) 73'; Ascanio 89'	Report	Bernal 33', (yellow card) 54'; Rodman (yellow card) 45+1'	Stadium: Snapdragon Stadium; Attendance: 12,810; Referee: Jeremy Scheer

May 30, 2026 11	Washington Spirit	2–1	Seattle Reign FC	Washington, D.C.
6:30 p.m. EDT (UTC-4)	Tsé (yellow card) 5'; Santos 18'; Sullivan (yellow card) 78'; Hershfelt 81'	Report	Ward (yellow card) 17'; Di Guglielmo 44' (o.g.); Menti (yellow card) 59'; McClernon (yellow card) 68'	Stadium: Audi Field; Attendance: 19,365; Referee: Alex Billeter

July 3, 2026 12	Washington Spirit	2–1	Houston Dash	Washington, D.C.
8:00 p.m. EDT (UTC-4)	Kouassi (penalty missed) 35'; Rodman 50', 90+4'; Abiodun (yellow card) 66'	Report	Patterson (yellow card) 33'; Schmidt (yellow card) 87'; Faasse 89'	Stadium: Audi Field; Attendance: 15,792; Referee: Danielle Chesky

July 11, 2026 13	North Carolina Courage	0–2	Washington Spirit	Cary, North Carolina
6:30 p.m. EDT (UTC-4)	Jackson (yellow card) 76'	Report	Santos 37'; Rodman 45+3'	Stadium: WakeMed Soccer Park; Attendance: 8,726; Referee: Laura Rodriguez

July 15, 2026 14	Gotham FC	1–0	Washington Spirit	New York, New York
8:00 p.m. EDT (UTC-4)	Lavelle 37'	Report	Carle (yellow card) 45+4'; Hershfelt (yellow card) 70'; Monday (yellow card) 80'; Rudd (yellow card) 86'	Stadium: Citi Field; Attendance: 42,175; Referee: Jeremy Scheer

July 19, 2026 15	Boston Legacy FC	1–2	Washington Spirit	Pawtucket, Rhode Island
7:00 p.m. EDT (UTC-4)	St-Georges (yellow card) 53'; Smith 88'	Report	Rudd 25'; Rodman 31'; Abiodun (yellow card) 45+3'; Sullivan (yellow card) 90+2'	Stadium: Centreville Bank Stadium; Attendance: 10,101; Referee: John Matto

July 26, 2026 16	Washington Spirit	1–0	Denver Summit FC	Washington, D.C.
7:00 p.m. EDT (UTC-4)	Cantore 61'	Report	Oke (yellow card) 55'; Gaetino (yellow card) 79'; Means (yellow card) 88'	Stadium: Audi Field; Attendance: 15,169; Referee: Elton García

July 29, 2026 17	Utah Royals FC	0–1	Washington Spirit	Sandy, Utah
9:00 p.m. EDT (UTC-4)	Cronin (yellow card) 90+1'	Report	Rodman 28'	Stadium: America First Field; Attendance: 9,538; Referee: Matthew Thompson

August 2, 2026 18	Washington Spirit	0–1	San Diego Wave FC	Washington, D.C.
4:00 p.m. EDT (UTC-4)		Report	Barcenas (yellow card) 38'; Godfrey 60'; Fazer (yellow card) 75'; Dali (yellow card) 90+8'	Stadium: Audi Field; Attendance: 14,470; Referee: JC Griggs

August 8, 2026 19	Washington Spirit	3–4	North Carolina Courage	Washington, D.C.
6:30 p.m. EDT (UTC-4)	Morgan (yellow card) 35'; Rodman 47'; Cantore 50'; Bernal 90'	Report	Sanchez 2'; Ijeh 9', 15'; Rauch (yellow card) 37'; Bøe Risa (yellow card) 75'; Jacobs 90+5'; Bell (yellow card) 90+8'	Stadium: Audi Field; Attendance: 14,168; Referee: Joshua Encarnación

August 16, 2026 20	Angel City FC	1–1	Washington Spirit	Los Angeles, California
9:00 p.m. EDT (UTC-4)	Sentnor 85'; King (yellow card) 90+7'	Report	Rodman 65'	Stadium: BMO Stadium; Attendance: 18,089; Referee: Alyssa Pennington

August 23, 2026 21	Washington Spirit	0–1	Orlando Pride	Washington, D.C.
4:00 p.m. EDT (UTC-4)	Carle (yellow card) 90+9'	Report	McCutcheon 3'; Banda (yellow card) 70'	Stadium: Audi Field; Attendance: 16,417; Referee: Matthew Corrigan

August 30, 2026 22	Washington Spirit	1–0	Bay FC	Washington, D.C.
12:30 p.m. EDT (UTC-4)	Metayer (yellow card) 35', (goal) 45+4'; Carle (yellow card) 79'	Report	Moreau (yellow card) 88'	Stadium: Audi Field; Attendance: 16,817; Referee: Calin Radosav

September 6, 2026 23	Portland Thorns FC	1–2	Washington Spirit	Portland, Oregon
4:00 p.m. EDT (UTC-4)	Wilson 18' (pen.); Perry (yellow card) 90+3'	Report	Ngock (yellow card) 26'; Rudd (yellow card) 32', (goal) 59' (pen.); Bethi 80'; Sullivan (yellow card) 90+2' (red card) 90+7'	Stadium: Providence Park; Attendance: 19,065; Referee: Cristian Campo Hernández

September 13, 2026 24	Washington Spirit	0–3	Boston Legacy FC	Washington, D.C.
1:00 p.m. EDT (UTC-4)	Hershfelt (yellow card) 39'; Ngock (yellow card) 43'; Martínez (yellow card) 76'	Report	Carabalí (yellow card) 20'; Hernández (yellow card) 45+5'; Traoré 81'; Gutierres 90+4', 90+6'	Stadium: Audi Field; Attendance: 15,588; Referee: Nabil Bensalah

September 20, 2026 25	Chicago Stars FC	0–3	Washington Spirit	Evanston, Illinois
5:00 p.m. EDT (UTC-4)	Franklin (yellow card) 33'	Report	Rodman 7'; Sullivan 34' (pen.); Tamara Bolt 85'	Stadium: Martin Stadium; Attendance: 5,762; Referee: Brandon Stevis

September 26, 2026 26	Washington Spirit	0–1	Angel City FC	Washington, D.C.
6:30 p.m. EDT (UTC-4)		Report	King (yellow card) 26'; Shores (yellow card) 45+1'; Sentnor (yellow card) 74'; Niehues 88'	Stadium: Audi Field; Attendance: 19,215; Referee: Matthew Thompson

October 4, 2026 27	Houston Dash	2–3	Washington Spirit	Houston, Texas
7:00 p.m. EDT (UTC-4)	Ivanović 44', 59'; Larisey (yellow card) 86'	Report	Rudd 11'; Cantore 51'; Luvanga 84'	Stadium: Shell Energy Stadium; Attendance: 7,917; Referee: Jaclyn Metz

October 17, 2026 28	Washington Spirit	1–0	Gotham FC	Washington, D.C.
12:30 p.m. EDT (UTC-4)	Di Guglielmo 70'	Report	Howell (yellow card) 61'; Torres (yellow card) 90+4'	Stadium: Audi Field; Attendance: 19,215; Referee: Abdou Ndiaye

October 25, 2026 29	Kansas City Current	2–1	Washington Spirit	Kansas City, Missouri
5:00 p.m. EDT (UTC-4)	LaBonta 14'; DiBernardo 17'; Bethune (yellow card) 48'; Ball (yellow card) 88'	Report	Luvanga 12'	Stadium: CPKC Stadium; Attendance: 18,000; Referee: Alyssa Pennington

November 1, 2026 30	Washington Spirit	2–0	Chicago Stars FC	Washington, D.C.
5:00 p.m. EST (UTC-5)	Hatch (yellow card) 22'; Alozie 62' (o.g.); Rodman 85'	Report	Alozie (yellow card) 56'; Dellarose (yellow card) 60'	Stadium: Audi Field; Attendance: 19,322; Referee: Shawn Tehini

=== Playoffs ===
Quarterfinals
1	Gotham FC	1
8	Seattle Reign FC	0
4	Kansas City Current	1 (a.e.t.)
5	Angel City FC	0
3	Washington Spirit	4
6	Portland Thorns FC	1
2	San Diego Wave FC	0
7	Utah Royals	1

Semifinals
1	Gotham FC	1
4	Kansas City Current	2
3	Washington Spirit	2
7	Utah Royals	1

Championship
3	Washington Spirit	1
4	Kansas City Current	2

November 8, 2026 Quarterfinals	Washington Spirit	4–1	Portland Thorns FC	Washington, District of Columbia
3:00 pm ET	Bethi 6'; Luvanga 34' (yellow card) 62'; Rodman 35', 58'; Morgan (yellow card) 82'	Report	Perry (yellow card) 47' (yellow-red card) 88'; Tordin 51'	Stadium: Audi Field; Attendance: 19,215; Referee: Nabil Bensalah

November 14, 2026 Semifinals	Washington Spirit	2–1	Utah Royals	Washington, District of Columbia
12:00 pm ET	Cantore 8'; Luvanga 56'; Rodman (yellow card) 90+4'	Report	Lacasse 2'; Tanaka (yellow card) 71'	Stadium: Audi Field; Attendance: 19,365; Referee: Calin Radosav

November 21, 2026 2026 NWSL Championship	Washington Spirit	1–2	Kansas City Current	Washington, D.C.
8:00 p.m. EST	Rodman 90+8'	Report	DiBernardo 54'; Debinha 90+7'	Stadium: Audi Field; Attendance: 19,365; Referee: Joshua Encarnacion

=== CONCACAF W Champions Cup ===
The Spirit entered the knockout stage as winners of Group B and finished as runners-up in the final.

==== Knockout stage ====
May 20, 2026 Semifinal	Washington Spirit	1–0	Pachuca	Pachuca, Mexico
	Claudia Martínez 81'	Report		Stadium: Estadio Hidalgo

May 23, 2026 Final	Club América	5–3	Washington Spirit	Pachuca, Mexico
	Aylín Aviléz 22' Geyse 27', 61'; Irene Guerrero 79' Esme Morgan 90+6' (o.g.)	Report	Sofia Cantore 30'; Rosemonde Kouassi 46', 58'	Stadium: Estadio Hidalgo

== Statistics ==
As of match played November 14, 2026

=== Appearances ===
Starting appearances are listed first, followed by substitute appearances after the + symbol where applicable.

No.	Pos	Nat	Player	Total		NWSL		Playoffs	
No.	Pos	Nat	Player	Apps	Goals	Apps	Goals	Apps	Goals
Goalkeepers
1	GK	(United States) USA	Aubrey Kingsbury	0	0	0	0	0	0
18	GK	(Scotland) SCO	Sandy MacIver	32	0	30	0	2	0
28	GK	(United States) USA	Sara Wojdelko	0	0	0	0	0	0
31	GK	(United States) USA	Kaylie Collins	0	0	0	0	0	0
Defenders
3	DF	(United States) USA	Casey Krueger	0	0	0	0	0	0
4	DF	(Mexico) MEX	Rebeca Bernal	20	3	17+3	3	0	0
5	DF	(Canada) CAN	Élisabeth Tsé	14	0	6+8	0	0	0
6	DF	(United States) USA	Kate Wiesner	18	0	14+4	0	0	0
9	DF	(United States) USA	Tara Rudd	32	3	30	3	2	0
13	DF	(Italy) ITA	Lucia Di Guglielmo	21	1	18+1	1	2	0
14	DF	(Canada) CAN	Gabrielle Carle	28	0	22+4	0	2	0
24	DF	(England) ENG	Esme Morgan	30	0	26+2	0	2	0
26	DF	(United States) USA	Paige Metayer	22	1	8+13	1	0+1	0
35	DF	(United States) USA	Madison Haugen	6	0	0+6	0	0	0
Midfielders
10	MF	(Algeria) ALG	Mélissa Bethi	11	2	5+4	1	2	1
10	MF	(Cameroon) CMR	Monique Ngock	10	0	3+5	0	0+2	0
10	MF	(Colombia) COL	Leicy Santos	24	5	20+2	5	2	0
12	MF	(United States) USA	Andi Sullivan	26	1	13+11	1	2	0
17	MF	(United States) USA	Hal Hershfelt	29	1	28+1	1	0	0
20	MF	(Nigeria) NGR	Deborah Abiodun	9	0	4+5	0	0	0
34	MF	(United States) USA	Molly Skurcenski	0	0	0	0	0	0
Forwards
2	FW	(United States) USA	Trinity Rodman	32	14	30	12	2	2
11	FW	(Paraguay) PAR	Claudia Martínez	22	3	4+17	3	0+1	0
16	FW	(Brazil) BRA	Tamara Bolt	18	1	2+15	1	0+1	0
19	FW	(Ivory Coast) CIV	Rosemonde Kouassi	25	0	17+7	0	0+1	0
21	FW	(Nigeria) NGR	Gift Monday	18	1	3+15	1	0	0
25	FW	(Tanzania) TAN	Clara Luvanga	7	4	2+3	2	2	2
27	FW	(Italy) ITA	Sofia Cantore	32	7	25+5	6	2	1
29	FW	(United States) USA	Emma Gaines-Ramos	0	0	0	0	0	0
33	FW	(United States) USA	Ashley Hatch	11	0	3+7	0	0+1	0
Players away from the club on loan:
22	MF	(United States) USA	Heather Stainbrook	0	0	0	0	0	0

== Transactions ==
=== Transfers in ===
Date	Player	Pos.	Previous club	Fee/notes	Ref.
December 31, 2025	(Italy) Lucia Di Guglielmo	DF	(Italy) Roma	Transfer	
January 13, 2026	(Canada) Élisabeth Tsé	DF	(France) Le Havre	Transfer	
January 26, 2026	(Paraguay) Claudia Martínez	FW	(Paraguay) Club Olimpia	Transfer	
July 9, 2026	(Cameroon) Monique Ngock	MF	(France) FC Fleury 91	Transfer	
July 21, 2026	(Burkina Faso) Alimata Bélem	DF	(Spain) SD Eibar	Transfer	
July 23, 2026	(Algeria) Mélissa Bethi	MF	(France) FC Nantes	Transfer	
September 9, 2026	(Tanzania) Clara Luvanga	FW	(Saudi Arabia) Al-Nassr FC	Transfer	

=== Transfers out ===
Date	Player	Pos.	New club	Fee/notes	Ref.
January 6, 2026	(United States) Courtney Brown	MF	(United States) Utah Royals FC	Contract terminated by mutual consent	
January 6, 2026	(United States) Brittany Ratcliffe	FW	Seattle Reign FC	Contract terminated by mutual consent	
January 6, 2026	(France) Ouleymata Sarr	FW	Free agent	End of contract	
January 6, 2026	(France) Kysha Sylla	DF	(France) OL Lyonnes	Return from loan	
January 12, 2026	(Japan) Narumi Miura	MF	(United States) Utah Royals FC	$180,000 in allocation money	
February 11, 2026	(United States) Croix Bethune	MF	(United States) Kansas City Current	$100,000 in allocation money and $900,000 in transfer threshold funds	
August 11, 2026	(United States) Molly Skurcenski	DF		Agreed to a mutual contract termination	
September 2, 2026	(Mexico) Rebeca Bernal	DF	(England) Manchester United	Transferred for undisclosed fee	
October 8, 2026	(Nigeria) Gift Monday	FW	(United States) Boston Legacy FC	Traded for $500,000 in transfer threshold funds, with a 20 percent sell-on clause	

=== Loans out ===
Date	Player	Pos.	Destination club	Fee/notes	Ref.
February 7, 2025	(Brazil) Tamara Bolt	FW	(United States) Dallas Trinity FC	Recalled from loan for 2026 preseason	
January 20, 2026	(United States) Heather Stainbrook	MF	(United States) Dallas Trinity FC	Loan for the entire year	
February 23, 2026	(United States) Sara Wojdelko	GK	(United States) DC Power FC	Loan through May 31	
July 21, 2026	(Burkina Faso) Alimata Bélem	DF	(Spain) SD Eibar	Loan through the end of the 2026 calendar year	
