= Gabrielle Carle =

Canadian soccer player (born 1998)

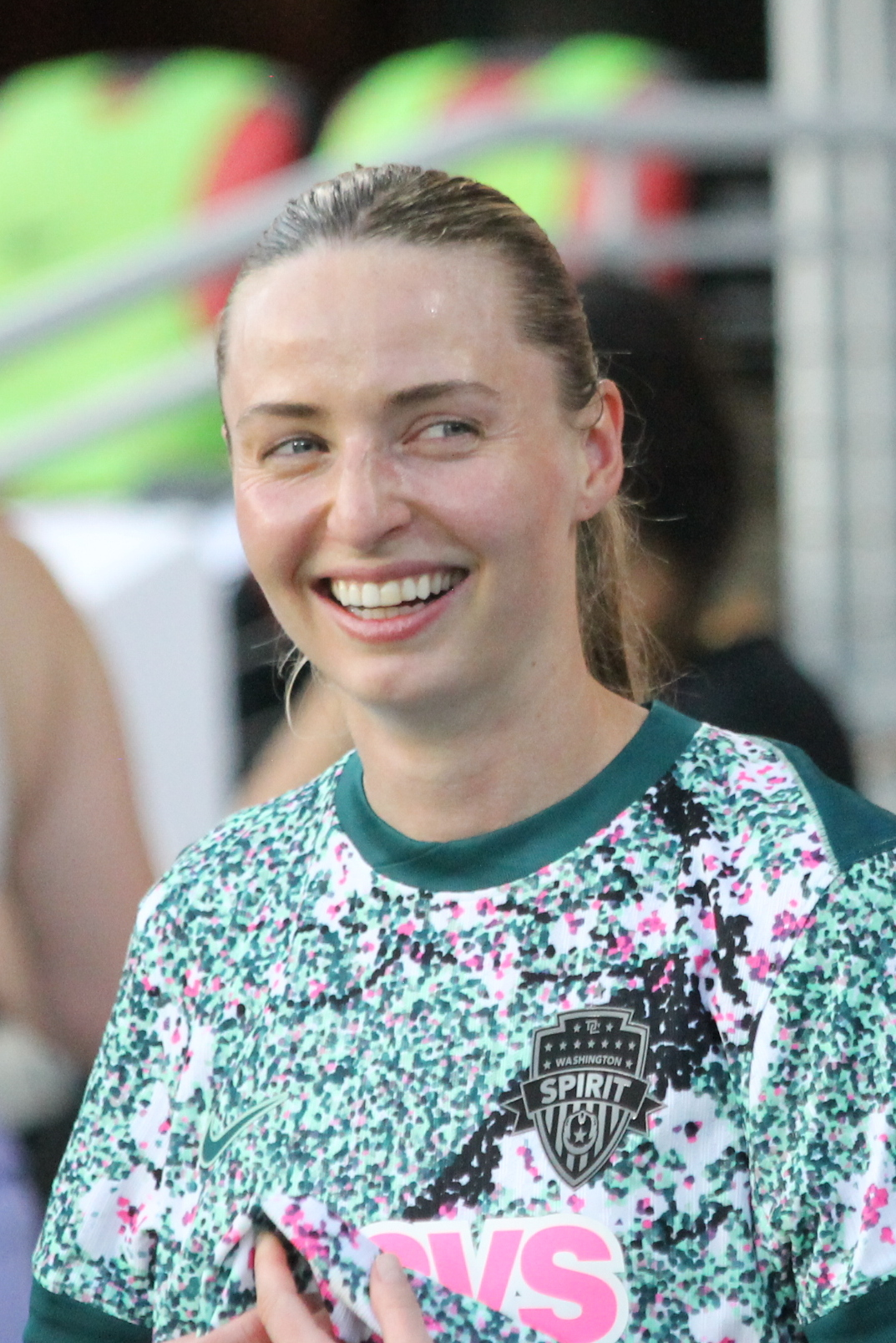
- Carle with the Washington Spirit in 2026

Personal information
- Full name: Gabrielle Carle
- Date of birth: October 12, 1998 (age 28)
- Place of birth: Quebec City, Quebec, Canada
- Height: 1.68 m (5 ft 6 in)
- Position: Full-back

Team information
- Current team: Washington Spirit
- Number: 14

Youth career
- 2004–2015: AS Chaudière-Est
- 2015–2016: Dynamo de Québec
- 2016–2017: CS Lévis-Est

College career
Years	Team	Apps	(Gls)
2017–2021	Florida State Seminoles	100	(8)

Senior career*
Years	Team	Apps	(Gls)
2015	Quebec Dynamo ARSQ		
2018	Dynamo de Québec	6	(3)
2022	Kristianstad	22	(2)
2023–	Washington Spirit	99	(0)

International career^{‡}
2014	Canada U17	4	(0)
2016–2018	Canada U20	8	(4)
2015	Canada U23	5	(0)
2015–	Canada	64	(1)
Medal record
Women's football
Representing Canada
CONCACAF W Championship
Runner-up	2018
Olympic Games
Gold medal – first place	2020	Team
- * Club domestic league appearances and goals as of 05:24, November 15, 2026 (UTC) ‡ National team caps and goals as of October 12, 2026

Gabrielle Carle (born October 12, 1998) is a Canadian professional soccer player who plays as a full-back for the Washington Spirit of the National Women's Soccer League (NWSL) and the Canadian national team. Carle played college soccer for the Florida State Seminoles, winning two national championships. She began her professional career with Swedish club Kristianstad in 2022, before moving to the Spirit the following year.

Carle made her senior debut for Canada at age 17 in 2015. She represented the nation at the 2019 and 2023 FIFA Women's World Cups and won a gold medal at the 2020 Tokyo Olympics.

== Early life ==
She began playing soccer when she was five years old with AS Chaudière-Est in Lévis. She attended the École secondaire des Sources in Montreal in the sport-study program. In 2015, she was named the best Junior player in the province of Quebec and the best Senior player in Quebec in 2016.

== College career ==
In 2017, she committed to Florida State University, where she would play for the women's soccer team. She scored her first goal in the 86th minute against Ole Miss on November 10 in the first round of the 2017 NCAA Women's Soccer Championship. In 2018, she helped FSU to win the 2018 NCAA Division I Championship.

== Club career ==
In 2015, she played with Quebec Dynamo ARSQ in the USL W-League. In 2018, she re-joined Dynamo de Quebec, now in the semi-professional PLSQ.

In December 2021, Carle joined Swedish club Kristianstad on an initial one-year contract beginning in 2022.

In December 2022, she joined the Washington Spirit of the National Women's Soccer League on a two-year contract with an option for 2025. In June 2025, the Spirit exercised an option to extend Carle's contraction for the 2026 season. In December 2025, Carle announced she would extend her time with the Spirit, with a contract through the 2029 season.

== International career ==
In 2013, at age 14, she was invited to a training camp for the Canada U17 team. The following year, she played for the Canada U20 team at the 2014 FIFA U-20 Women's World Cup, playing in all four of Canada's games. In 2015, Carle was named to the roster for the Pan American Games, where she featured in all five of Canada's games, with the team finishing in fourth place.

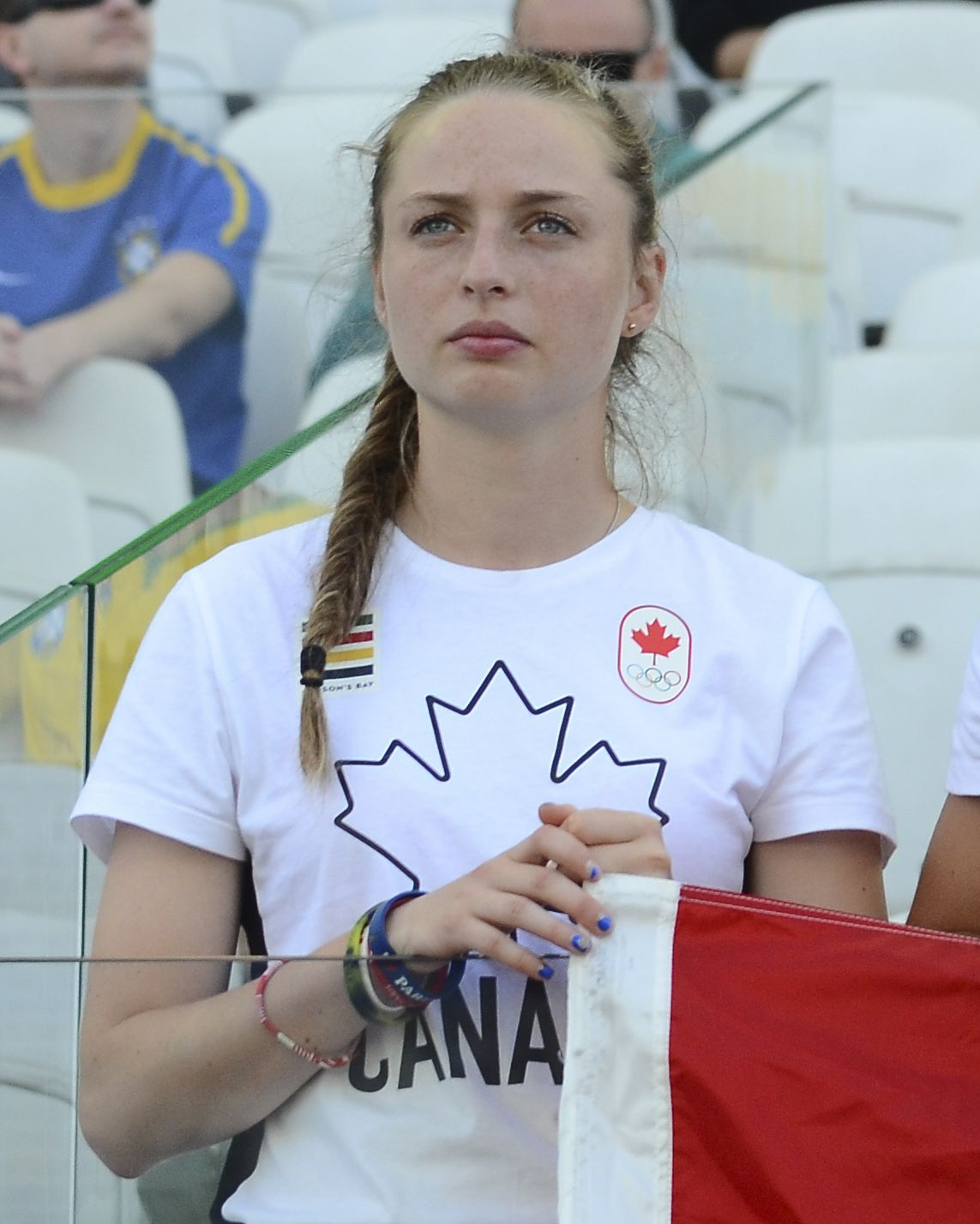
Carle at the 2016 Olympics

Carle debuted for the senior team on December 9, 2015, against Mexico. She scored her first goal for Canada in a 10–0 win against Guatemala in the 2016 CONCACAF Women's Olympic Qualifying Championship.

She played every minute of her team's matches at the 2016 FIFA U-20 Women's World Cup, scoring against Nigeria. She was named as an alternate player for Canada at the 2016 Olympics, where the team won a bronze medal.

In 2018, Carle captained the U20 side at the 2018 CONCACAF Women's U-20 Championship, scoring twice during the group stage, and also against Mexico in the semi-finals, where Canada bowed out after a penalty shootout.

On May 25, 2019, she was named to the roster for the 2019 FIFA Women's World Cup. In 2021, she was named as an alternate for Canada for the delayed 2020 Olympics.

Carle was called up to the 23-player Canada squad for the 2023 FIFA Women's World Cup.

Carle was called up to the Canada squad for the 2024 CONCACAF W Gold Cup, which Canada finished as semifinalists. Later that year, she was called up to the Canada squad for the 2024 Summer Olympics.

== Personal life ==
Carle's father, Jean, worked as a physician. In March 2026, Carle passed the Medical College Admission Test. She plans to follow in her father's footsteps and pursue a career in medicine after her time in soccer concludes.

== Career statistics ==
=== Club ===
As of July 11, 2026

Club	League	Season	League		Playoffs		Domestic Cup		Continental Cup		Total	
Club	League	Season	Apps	Goals	Apps	Goals	Apps	Goals	Apps	Goals	Apps	Goals
Kristianstads DFF	Damallsvenskan	2022	22	0	0	0	3	0	2	0	27	0
Washington Spirit	NWSL	2023	22	0	0	0	2	0	0	0	24	0
Washington Spirit	NWSL	2024	26	0	3	0	0	0	0	0	29	0
Washington Spirit	NWSL	2025	25	0	1	0	1	0	5	0	32	0
Washington Spirit	NWSL	2026	9	0	0	0	0	0	0	0	9	0
Washington Spirit	Total		82	0	4	0	3	0	5	0	94	0
Career total			104	0	4	0	6	0	7	0	121	0

== International goals ==
No.	Date	Venue	Opponent	Score	Result	Competition
1.	16 February 2016	BBVA Compass Stadium, Houston, United States	Guatemala	2–0	10–0	2016 CONCACAF Women's Olympic Qualifying Championship

== Honours ==
Florida State Seminoles

- NCAA Division I Women's Soccer Championship: 2018, 2021
- ACC Women's Soccer Tournament: 2018, 2020, 2021
- ACC Women's Regular Season Champions: 2020

Washington Spirit

- NWSL Challenge Cup: 2025

Canada

- Summer Olympics: 2021

Individual

- All-ACC Second Team: 2021
- College Cup All-Tournament Team: 2018
