= Kai Tsakiris =

American soccer player (born 2006)

Personal information
- Full name: Kai Alexandra Tsakiris
- Date of birth: 2006 (age 19–20)
- Height: 5 ft 4 in (1.63 m)
- Positions: Midfielder; forward

Team information
- Current team: Tennessee Volunteers

Youth career
- Los Gatos United
- 2021–2022: Los Gatos Wildcats
- 2022–2025: Slammers FC HB Køge
- 2022–2025: Corona del Mar Sea Kings

College career
Years	Team	Apps	(Gls)
2025	Florida Gators	18	(4)
2026–	Tennessee Volunteers	0	(0)

International career^{‡}
2025–	United States U-20	2	(0)
- ‡ National team caps and goals as of December 2, 2025

Kai Alexandra Tsakiris (born 2006) is an American college soccer player who plays as a midfielder or forward for the Tennessee Volunteers. She previously played for the Florida Gators.

== Early life ==
Tsakiris grew up in Newport Beach, California. She attended Los Gatos High School for one year before transferring to Corona del Mar High School in 2022, earning All-SCA sectional honors as a sophomore. She played club soccer for Los Gatos United before moving to Slammers FC HB Køge. In her junior year at Corona Del Mar, she committed to play college soccer for Florida and was an All-CIF-SS selection. In early 2025, after attending a training camp in Brazil organized by the Kansas City Current, she was ruled ineligible for the rest of her senior high school season. Current general manager Caitlin Carducci said the CIF ruling was misguided as the camp was not a tryout. Later that year, Tsakiris helped lead Slammers to the ECNL under-18/19 national title and was named the ECNL U18/19 National Player of the Year.

== College career ==
Tsakiris was an immediate standout for the Florida Gators as a freshman in 2025. She started all 18 games and led the team in points with 4 goals and 5 assists, earning third-team All-SEC and SEC all-freshman honors. With several other contributing freshmen, she helped Florida earn their first SEC tournament berth in four years. She then transferred to the Tennessee Volunteers for her sophomore season in 2026.

== International career ==
After her freshman season at Florida, Tsakiris was called up to play friendlies for the United States under-20 team in November–December 2025.

== Personal life ==
Tsakiris is the daughter of Nyssa and Shaun Tsakiris. Her brothers Niko and Mateo are also soccer players.

== Honors and awards ==
Individual

- Third-team All-SEC: 2025
- SEC all-freshman team: 2025
