= 2025 SEC women's soccer tournament =

- Classification: Division I
- Site: Ashton Brosnaham Soccer Complex; Pensacola, Florida
- Champions: Vanderbilt (4th title)
- Winning coach: Darren Ambrose (2nd)
- MVP: Courtney Jones
- Broadcast: SEC Network

The 2025 SEC women's soccer tournament was the postseason women's soccer tournament for the Southeastern Conference held from November 2 to November 9, 2025. The tournament was held at the Ashton Brosnaham Soccer Complex in Pensacola, Florida. The twelve-team single elimination tournament consisted of four rounds based on seeding from regular season conference play. The Texas Longhorns are the defending champions. The conference championship is the fourth SEC title for Vanderbilt, the second under Darren Ambrose. Previously, Ambrose had won three Ivy League championships as head coach at the University of Pennsylvania. As conference champions, Vanderbilt earned the Southeastern Conference's automatic berth into the 2025 NCAA Division I women's soccer tournament.

2025 SEC women's soccer standings
	Conf.						Overall
Team	W		L		T	PCT	W		L		T	PCT
No. 17 Arkansas ‍†‍‍^{y}	7	–	1	–	2	.800	10	–	5	–	4	.632
No. 5 Vanderbilt ‍‍‡‍^{y}	7	–	2	–	1	.750	19	–	4	–	1	.813
Georgia ‍‍‍^{y}	6	–	1	–	3	.750	11	–	5	–	5	.643
Tennessee ‍‍‍^{y}	6	–	2	–	2	.700	12	–	4	–	3	.711
No. 16 LSU ‍‍‍^{y}	5	–	2	–	3	.650	15	–	7	–	3	.660
Kentucky ‍‍‍^{y}	5	–	2	–	3	.650	12	–	5	–	4	.667
South Carolina ‍‍‍^{y}	4	–	2	–	4	.600	10	–	5	–	5	.625
Mississippi St. ‍‍‍^{y}	5	–	4	–	1	.550	12	–	7	–	1	.625
Oklahoma ‍‍‍	3	–	4	–	3	.450	10	–	5	–	4	.632
Alabama ‍‍‍^{y}	4	–	6	–	0	.400	12	–	9	–	1	.568
Florida ‍‍‍	2	–	3	–	5	.450	6	–	7	–	5	.472
Auburn ‍‍‍	1	–	3	–	6	.400	5	–	6	–	7	.472
Texas A&M ‍‍‍	2	–	6	–	2	.300	5	–	7	–	5	.441
Texas ‍‍‍	2	–	8	–	0	.200	4	–	12	–	1	.265
Missouri ‍‍‍	1	–	7	–	2	.200	4	–	10	–	3	.324
Ole Miss ‍‍‍	0	–	7	–	3	.150	4	–	8	–	3	.367
† – Conference champion ‡ – 2025 SEC Tournament champion y – Invited to the NCAA Tournament; As of December 9, 2025; Rankings from United Soccer Coaches Poll; Source: SEC

== Qualification ==
The top twelve teams in the conference qualified for the 2025 Tournament. The top four teams were awarded byes into the Quarterfinals. Teams were seeded based on regular season records. Previous SEC champions Texas failed to qualify after winning last year. As the season approaches its ending, No. 6 Arkansas defeated Oklahoma and Arkansas was crowned the regular season champions. The top four teams were all separated by one point. The Razorbacks scored three goals and marked them as the no. 01 qualifier for the tournament.

Seed	School	Conference Record	Conference Points
1	Arkansas	7-1-2	23
2	Vanderbilt	7-2-1	22
3	Georgia	6-1-3	21
4	Tennessee	6-2-2	20
5	LSU	5-2-3	18
6	Kentucky	5-2-3	18
7	South Carolina	4-2-4	16
8	Mississippi State	5-4-1	16
9	Oklahoma	3-4-3	12
10	Alabama	4-6-0	12
11	Florida	2-3-5	11
12	Auburn	1-3-6	9

== Bracket ==
First Round; Sunday, Nov. 02
7	South Carolina	0
10	Alabama	2
6	Kentucky	1
11	Florida	0
8	Mississippi State	1
9	Oklahoma	0
5	LSU	3
12	Auburn	2

Quarterfinals; Tuesday, Nov. 04
2	Vanderbilt	2
7	Alabama	1
3	Georgia (PK 5-4)	1
6	Kentucky	1
1	Arkansas	1
8	Mississippi State	2
4	Tennessee	0
5	LSU	2

Semifinals; Thursday, Nov. 06
2	Vanderbilt	2
3	Georgia	0
8	Mississippi State	1
5	LSU	3

Championship; Sunday, Nov. 09
2	Vanderbilt (PK 8-7)	1
5	LSU	1

== Matches ==
First Round

2 November 2025 Match 1	#10 Alabama	2-0	#7 South Carolina	Pensacola, Florida
	Kennedy Garcia (yellow card) 57'; Larkin Thomason 75'; Gianna Paul 88'	Report	Taylor Bloom (yellow card) 20'; Maggie Taitano (yellow card) 56'	Stadium: Brosnaham Soccer Complex

2 November 2025 Match 2	#11 Florida	0-1	#6 Kentucky	Pensacola, Florida
	Kai Tsakiris (yellow card) 46'; Charlotte McClure (yellow card) 88'	Report	Catherine Rapp 10'; Skye Leach (yellow card) 61'; Catherine Rapp (yellow card) 64'	Stadium: Brosnaham Soccer Complex

2 November 2025 Match 3	#8 Mississippi St.	1-0	#9 Oklahoma	Pensacola, Florida
	Tatum Borman 81'	Report	Juliette Rayo (yellow card) 73'

2 November 2025 Match 4	#5 LSU	3-2	#12 Auburn	Pensacola, Florida
	Ava Galligan 7'goals2=Dylan Driver 68'	Report

Quarterfinals

04 November 2025 Match 5	#2 Vanderbilt	2-1	#7 Alabama	Pensacola, Florida
	Olivia Stafford 13'; Reagan Pentz 49'; Margo Matula (yellow card) 81'	Report	Nadia Ramadan 11' (yellow card) 81'; Madi Munguia (red card) 13'; Kennedy Garcia (yellow card) 83'	Stadium: Brosnaham Soccer Complex; Attendance: 1183

04 November 2025 Match 6	#3 Georgia	1-1 (5-4 p)	#6 Kentucky	Pensacola, Florida
	Summer Denigan 74'	Report	Catherine Rapp 53'; Anna Sikorski (yellow card) 105'	Stadium: Brosnaham Soccer Complex; Attendance: 1183
	Penalties
	Harris (penalty scored); Denigan (penalty scored); Kante (penalty scored); Staude (penalty scored); Hardin (penalty missed); Herniter (penalty scored)		(penalty missed) Poretto; (penalty scored) Sikorski; (penalty scored) Fink; (penalty scored) Campbell; (penalty scored) Hoytink; (penalty missed) Leach

04 November 2025 Match 7	#1 Arkansas	2-1	#8 Mississippi State	Pensacola, Florida
	Bella Field 22'; Natalie Wagner (yellow card) 56'; Team (yellow card) 62'; Dejionee Anderson (yellow card) 63'; Aniyah Nurse-Whyte (yellow card) 79'	Report	Rebeka Vega-Peleka 22'; Ally Perry 58'; Tatum Borman (yellow card) 87'

04 November 2025 Match 8	#4 Tennessee	0-2	#5 LSU	Pensacola, Florida
	Kate Runyon (yellow card) 78'	Report	Morgan Witz 46'; Ida Hermannsdottir 48'; Daniela Hellin (yellow card) 87'; Jazmin Ferguson (yellow card) 88'	Stadium: Brosnaham Soccer Complex; Attendance: 1147

Semifinals

06 November 2025 Match 9	#5 LSU	3-1	#8 Mississippi St.	Pensacola, Florida
	Ava Galligan 17' Ida Hermannsdottir 29' Sariyah Bailey 31' (yellow card) 54' Ava Amsden (yellow card) 58' Mireia Sanchez (yellow card) 84'	Report	Rebeka Vega-Peleka (red card) 29'; Tatum Borman 62'; Sofía Aguayo (yellow card) 79'	Stadium: Brosnaham Soccer Complex

06 November 2025 Match 10	#2 Vanderbilt	2-0	#3 Georgia	Pensacola, Florida
	Sydney Watts 15', 67'; Vivian Akyirem (yellow card) 76'	Report	Maddy Herniter (yellow card) 67'; Hailey Gordon (yellow card) 75'	Stadium: Brosnaham Soccer Complex; Attendance: 1353

Finals

09 November 2025 Match 11	#5 LSU	1-1 (a.e.t.) (7-8 p)	#2 Vanderbilt	Pensacola, Florida
	Gabbi Ceballos 25'; Kelsey Major (yellow card) 62'; Makenna Dominguez (yellow card) 68'; Team (yellow card) 69'	Report	Vivian Akyirem 69'; Ally Bollig (yellow card) 84'; Team (yellow card) 92'	Stadium: Brosnaham Soccer Complex; Attendance: 2367
	Penalties
	Cheesman (penalty scored); Hermannsdottir (penalty scored); Amsden (penalty scored); Blanco González (penalty missed); Witz (penalty missed); Dominguez (penalty scored); Major (penalty scored); Ceballos (penalty scored); Smith (penalty scored); Ferguson (penalty missed)		(penalty scored) Jones; (penalty missed) McLaughlin; (penalty scored) Akyirem; (penalty missed) Pentz; (penalty scored) Watts; (penalty scored) Bollig; (penalty scored) Freeman; (penalty scored) Teater; (penalty scored) Matula; (penalty scored) McLaughlin

== Statistics ==
=== Goalscorers ===
There were 25 goals scored in 11 matches, for an average of 2.27 goals per match (as of 14 November 2025).

2 goals

- Ava Galligan - LSU
- Ida Hermannsdottir - LSU
- Catherine Rapp - Kentucky
- Sydney Watts - Vanderbilt
- Morgan Witz - LSU

1 goal

- Vivian Akyirem - Vanderbilt
- Sariyah Bailey - LSU
- Tatum Borman - Mississippi State
- Gabbi Ceballos - LSU
- Summer Denigan - Georgia
- Dylan Driver - Auburn
- Bella Field - Arkansas
- Gadea Blanco González - LSU
- Gianna Paul - Alabama
- Reagan Pentz - Vanderbilt
- Ally Perry - Mississippi State
- Nadia Ramadan - Alabama
- Shelby Sallee - Auburn
- Olivia Stafford - Vanderbilt
- Larkin Thomason - Alabama
- Rebeka Vega-Peleka- Mississippi State

== All-Tournament Team ==
Player	Team
Courtney Jones	Vanderbilt
Olivia Stafford	Vanderbilt
Sydney Watts	Vanderbilt
Sara Wojdelko	Vanderbilt
Gabbi Ceballos	LSU
Jazmin Ferguson	LSU
Ava Galligan	LSU
