= Jazmin Ferguson =

American soccer player

Personal information
- Date of birth: 2003 or 2004 (age 22–23)
- Place of birth: Pembroke Pines, Florida, United States
- Height: 5 ft 9 in (1.75 m)
- Position: Defender

Team information
- Current team: LSU Tigers
- Number: 44

Youth career
- Gwinnett Soccer Academy

College career
Years	Team	Apps	(Gls)
2022–2023	East Carolina Pirates	37	(5)
2024–	LSU Tigers	45	(4)

Senior career*
Years	Team	Apps	(Gls)
2024	Decatur FC	–	(–)
2026	Tampa Bay Sun	0	(0)
- * Club domestic league appearances and goals as of 21:40, July 26, 2026 (UTC)

Jazmin Ferguson is a college soccer player who plays as a defender for the LSU Tigers. Born in the United States, she has been called up to the Jamaica national team. She has previously played collegiately East Carolina Pirates and spent a professional stint with USL Super League club Tampa Bay Sun FC.

== Early life ==
Born in Pembroke Pines, Florida, Ferguson grew up one state over in Conyers, Georgia. She was inspired to begin playing soccer at the age of six after attending her two older brothers' practices. She attended Heritage High School, where she captained the school's team in all but one of her four years. Ferguson played club soccer for the Gwinnett Soccer Academy, where she was a two-time all-region first-team honoree. In her freshman season with the academy, she earned Defensive Player of the Year honors after helping GSA go undefeated in regional play and reach league semifinals. She was also named team captain the following year.

== College career ==
=== East Carolina Pirates ===
Ferguson played two seasons of college soccer for the East Carolina Pirates. On September 22, 2022, she netted her first collegiate goal, a header in a 1–0 win over Houston. She was named the American Athletic Conference (AAC) Defensive Player of the Week shortly afterward for her performance in that match. She ended her freshman season as the AAC Rookie of the Year and a second-team all-conference honoree. As a sophomore in 2023, Ferguson was named first-team All-ACC and the conference's Co-Defensive Player of the Year. She started in all 19 of the Pirates' matches and recorded a career-high 4 goals.

After departing from East Carolina in 2024, Ferguson spent the offseason leading up to her junior year back in her home state of Georgia with Decatur FC. She was a member of the club's inaugural Women's Premier Soccer League squad.

=== LSU Tigers ===
Ferguson transferred to Louisiana State University to finish her final two years of college. She scored goals in each of her first two games for the Tigers, contributing to a win against South Alabama and a loss to Arizona State. She soon became a consistent piece in LSU's backline and started 20 matches across the year. As a senior in 2025, Ferguson was named third-team All-SEC and honored as LSU's Defensive Player of the Year. A team captain and the Tigers' squad leader in minutes, she forged a strong partnership in central defense with Sydney Cheesman that took the LSU to the Sweet Sixteen of the NCAA tournament. Ferguson also captained the Tigers to the SEC tournament championship match, later earning individual recognition as one of three LSU players on the SEC all-tournament team.

On July 9, 2026, Ferguson was announced to have signed her first professional contract with USL Super League club Tampa Bay Sun FC. She departed from Tampa Bay on a mutual contract termination the following month after not having made an appearance through the first three matches of the season.

Ferguson opted to return to LSU for a fifth year after an NCAA eligibility lawsuit allowed athletes from the class of 2022 to exercise an additional season of eligibility. She played her first game back as a Tiger on August 30, 2026, participating in a draw with Arizona.

== International career ==
Ferguson is eligible to represent Jamaica internationally through both of her parents. Growing up, she visited the country annually with her family. In January 2022, she earned an invitation to a Jamaica youth national team training camp in Kingston.

In February 2025, Ferguson earned her first call-up to the Jamaica senior national team ahead of two matches against Peru.

== Honors and awards ==
Individual

- AAC Co-Defensive Player of the Year: 2023
- AAC Rookie of the Year: 2022
- First-team All-AAC: 2023
- Second-team All-AAC: 2022
- Third-team All-SEC: 2025
- SEC tournament all-tournament team: 2025
