= Élisabeth Tsé =

Canadian soccer player (born 2002)

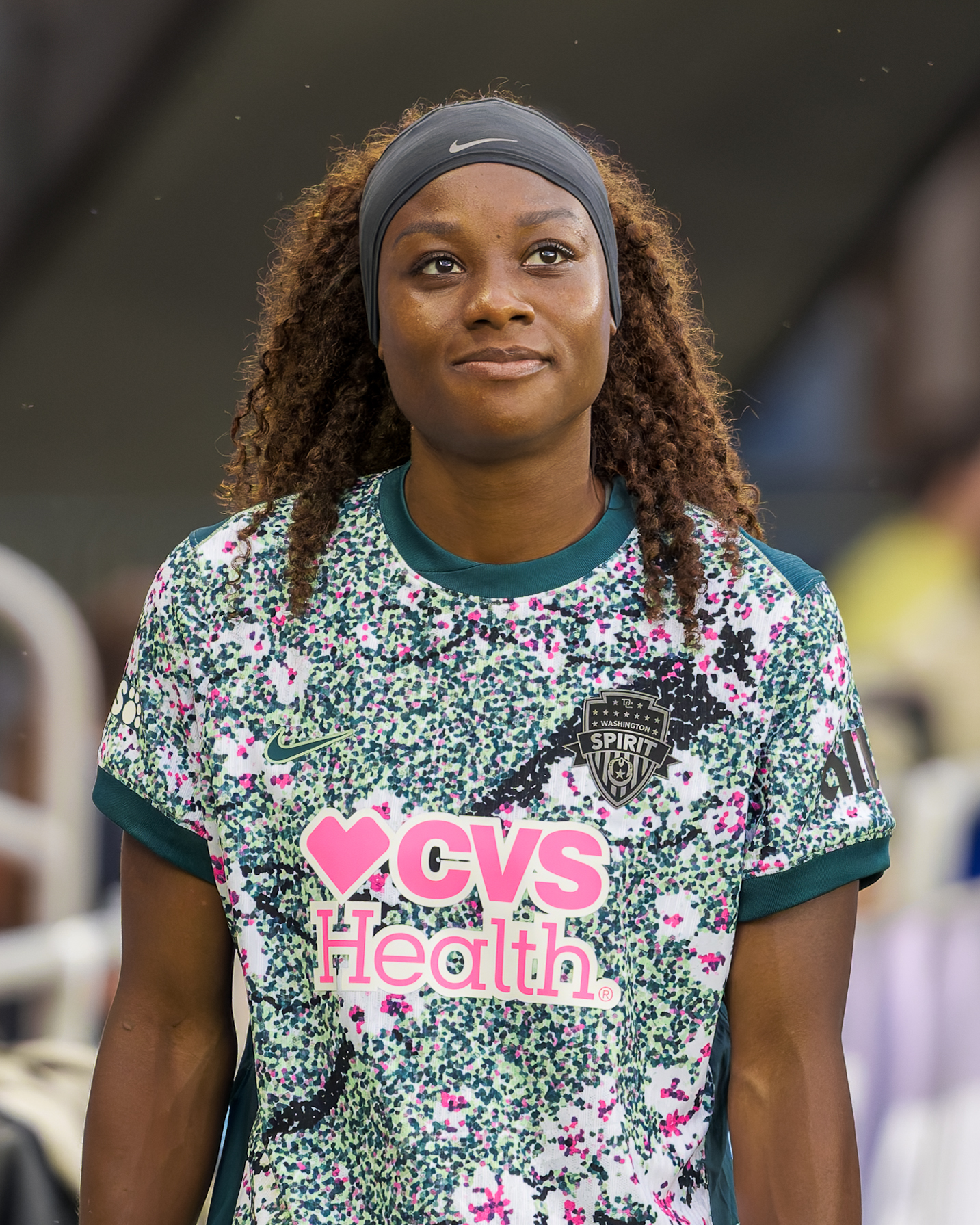
- Tsé with the Washington Spirit in 2026

Personal information
- Full name: Lou-Ahou-Élisabeth Tsé
- Date of birth: December 7, 2002 (age 23)
- Place of birth: Quebec City, Quebec, Canada
- Height: 1.71 m (5 ft 7 in)
- Position: Defender

Team information
- Current team: Washington Spirit
- Number: 5

Youth career
- 2007–2020: Phénix des Rivières
- 2020–2021: Lyon

College career
Years	Team	Apps	(Gls)
2021	SMU Mustangs	19	(2)

Senior career*
Years	Team	Apps	(Gls)
2022–2023	GPSO 92 Issy	21	(2)
2023–2025	Le Havre	45	(0)
2026–	Washington Spirit	14	(0)

International career^{‡}
2018	Canada U-17	2	(0)
2022	Canada U-20	9	(0)
2026–	Canada	2	(0)
- * Club domestic league appearances and goals as of 05:30, November 15, 2026 (UTC) ‡ National team caps and goals as of October 12, 2026

Lou-Ahou-Élisabeth Tsé (born December 7, 2002) is a Canadian professional soccer player who plays as a defender for the Washington Spirit of the National Women's Soccer League (NWSL) and the Canada national team. She played college soccer for the SMU Mustangs before starting her professional career in France with GPSO 92 Issy and Le Havre.

== Early life ==
Tsé was born in Quebec City, the daughter of Ivorian parents Abi and Darius Tsé. She followed her father and her brother, Isaac, onto the soccer field and began playing when she was four, joining local club Phénix des Rivières. She also played other sports such as figure skating and track and field. She later trained with the National Development Centre in Montreal and won gold representing Quebec at the 2017 Canada Summer Games. In 2020, she was spotted by coaches from Lyon and joined their U19 academy for one season, declining an extension with the club to play college soccer for the SMU Mustangs.

== College career ==
Tsé started all 19 games and scored 2 goals for the SMU Mustangs as a freshman in 2021. She was named second-team All-AAC and helped the team reach the NCAA tournament second round, losing to eventual champions Florida State. After one season in University Park, she wanted to return to European soccer and gave up her remaining college eligibility.

== Club career ==
Tsé signed her first professional contract with newly relegated Division 2 Féminine club GPSO 92 Issy before the 2022–23 season. On September 11, 2022, she made her professional debut and played the entire opening day match in a 4–0 defeat to Strasbourg. On October 16, 2022, she scored her first professional goal to conclude a 2–0 win over Nantes.

Tsé moved to Division 1 Féminine club Le Havre the following season. On September 15, 2023, she made her Division 1 debut as Le Havre began the season with a 4–0 loss to her former club Lyon. Before the 2024–25 season, she signed a three-year contract extension. She totaled 49 appearances over two-and-a-half seasons with Le Havre.

On January 13, 2026, the Washington Spirit announced that they had acquired Tsé for a transfer fee, signing her to a three-year contract with the option for another year.

== International career ==
Tsé made her international debut for the Canada under-17 team at the 2018 CONCACAF Women's U-17 Championship, playing in two games as the team finished third. She played in all seven games for the Canada under-20 team at the 2022 CONCACAF Women's U-20 Championship, again placing third. She played in two games at the 2022 FIFA U-20 Women's World Cup as Canada was eliminated in the group stage.

In March 2024, Tsé said "my heart cannot choose" between representing Canada or the Ivory Coast at the international level. Two years later, in May 2026, Tsé received her first call-up to the Canada senior national team. On May 10, she made her senior international debut in a 6–0 friendly win over Costa Rica.

== Career statistics ==
=== International ===
As of match played June 10, 2026

Appearances and goals by national team and year
National team	Year	Apps	Goals
Canada	2026	1	0
Total		1	0

== Honours and awards ==
Individual

- Second-team All-AAC: 2021
