= Sara Wojdelko =

American soccer player (born 2003)

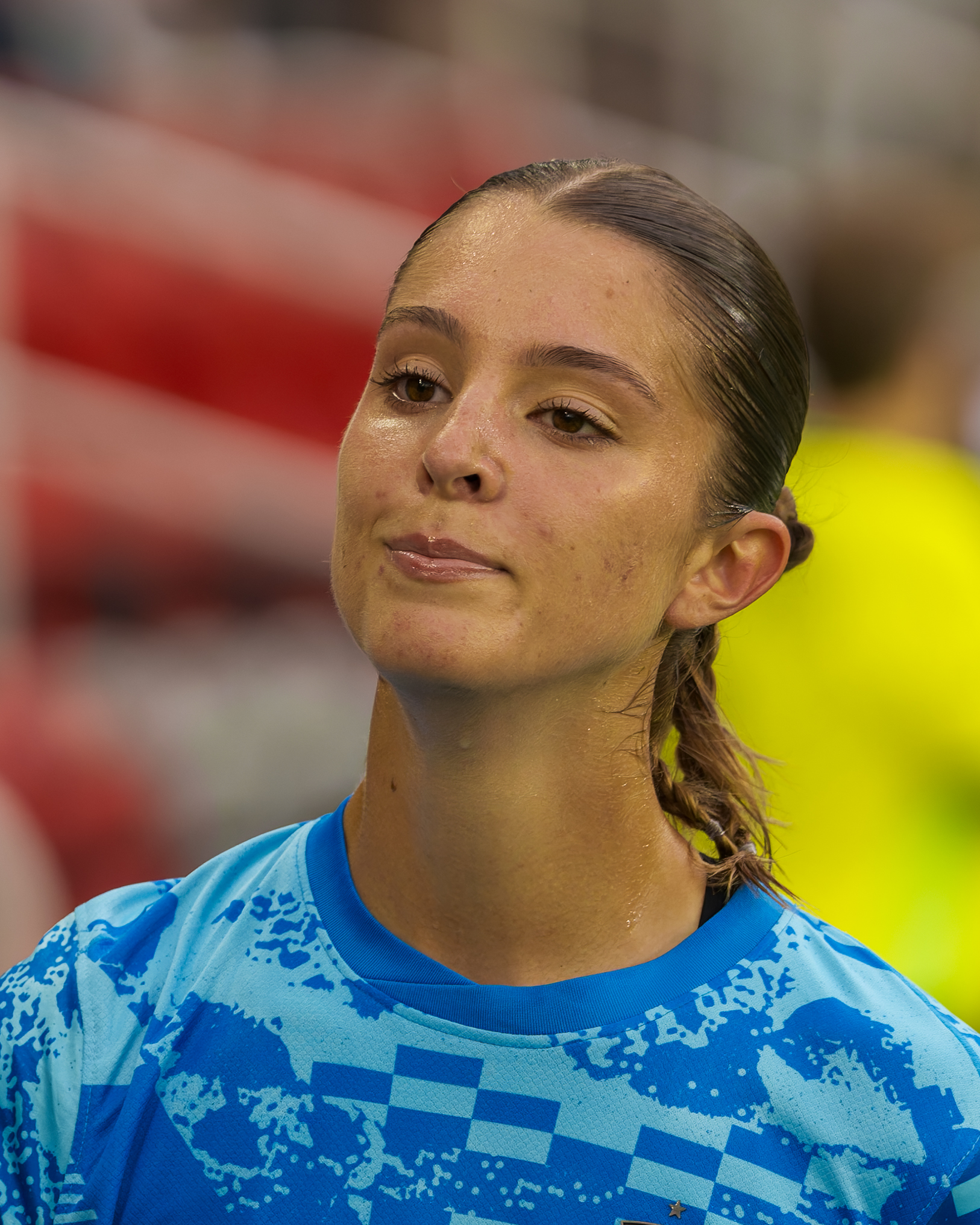
- Wojdelko with the Washington Spirit in 2026

Personal information
- Full name: Sara Nicole Wojdelko
- Date of birth: May 14, 2003 (age 23)
- Place of birth: Park Ridge, Illinois, U.S.
- Height: 5 ft 8 in (1.73 m)
- Position: Goalkeeper

Team information
- Current team: Washington Spirit
- Number: 28

Youth career
- Michigan Hawks

College career
Years	Team	Apps	(Gls)
2021–2025	Vanderbilt Commodores	69	(0)

Senior career*
Years	Team	Apps	(Gls)
2026–	Washington Spirit	0	(0)
2026	→ DC Power FC (loan)	1	(0)
- * Club domestic league appearances and goals as of March 7, 2026

Sara Nicole Wojdelko (born May 14, 2003) is an American professional soccer player who plays as a goalkeeper for the Washington Spirit of the National Women's Soccer League (NWSL). She played college soccer for the Vanderbilt Commodores, earning second-team All-American honors in 2025.

== Early life ==
Wojdelko was born in Park Ridge, Illinois, and raised in Northville, Michigan. She didn't begin playing goalkeeper until she was twelve. She then joined ECNL club Michigan Hawks. She attended Northville High School, where she played basketball and football.

== College career ==
Wojdelko was redshirted as a freshman with the Vanderbilt Commodores in 2021. In 2022, Kate Devine returned as the starter until Wojdelko won the job during the season. She kept 4 clean sheets in 11 appearances. In the NCAA tournament, she made a season-high six saves in a 1–0 win over Clemson, reaching the second round. In 2023, she lost the starting competition to Devine and played just four games all season as the team missed the SEC tournament.

Wojdelko re-won the starting job as both goalkeepers returned to the team in 2024. During the NCAA tournament, she came to national prominence for her career-high 14-save performance against defending national champions Florida State in the second round. After a 3–3 draw, she stopped two penalties in the resulting shootout to send Vanderbilt to the NCAA third round for the first time. She finished the season with 7 clean sheets in 17 starts.

Wojdelko returned to Vanderbilt for her fifth and final season in 2025. She helped the Commodores win their fourth SEC tournament title, saving three penalties in the ten-round shootout against LSU in the final. Vanderbilt earned a one seed in the NCAA tournament and reached the quarterfinals, both program firsts, and Wojdelko saved a regulation penalty in a rematch with LSU in the tournament. She finished the season as the SEC leader in several categories with 58 saves, 0.567 goals against average, and 11 clean sheets in 23 games. She was named first-team All-SEC, second-team All-American, and the SEC Goalkeeper of the Year.

== Club career ==
The Washington Spirit announced on January 9, 2026, that they had signed Wojdelko to her first professional contract on a one-year deal. On February 23, the Spirit announced that she would join USL Super League club DC Power FC on loan through May. Haley Carter said the loan was structured so that Wojdelko would train with the Spirit for most of the week but could gain playing time with DC Power. With usual starter Morgan Aquino on international duty, she made her professional debut for DC Power on March 7, keeping a clean sheet in a 2–0 win over Brooklyn FC. Injury limited her to one appearance before she was recalled to her parent club on April 13.

== Honors and awards ==
Vanderbilt Commodores

- SEC women's soccer tournament: 2025

Individual

- Second-team All-American: 2025
- First-team All-SEC: 2025
- SEC Goalkeeper of the Year: 2025
- SEC tournament all-tournament team: 2022, 2025
