= Shaun Tsakiris =

American soccer player

Personal information
- Full name: Shaun Nikolas Tsakiris
- Date of birth: February 16, 1979 (age 47)
- Place of birth: San Jose, California, United States
- Height: 5 ft 7 in (1.70 m)
- Position: Midfielder

College career
| Years | Team | Apps | (Gls) |
| 1997–2000 | UCLA Bruins | | |

Senior career*
| Years | Team | Apps | (Gls) |
| 2001 | New England Revolution | 0 | (0) |
| 2002–2005 | Rochester Rhinos | 42 | (1) |

International career
| 1999 | United States U20 | | |

Managerial career
- 2016–2018: United States U16
- * Club domestic league appearances and goals

Shaun Nikolas Tsakiris (born February 16, 1979) is an American former soccer player who played as a midfielder.

== Club career ==
Tsakiris was picked by New England Revolution in 2001 MLS SuperDraft from UCLA.

In 2002, he signed with Rochester Rhinos, where he played for three seasons in USL A-League.

== International career ==
Tsakiris was part of the United States U20 that participated in the 1999 FIFA World Youth Championship.

== Managerial career ==
Tsakiris is currently Technical Director at Los Gatos United Soccer Club.
